= 1893 Texas Longhorns football team =

American college football season

1893 Texas Longhorns football

State champions
- Conference: Independent
- Record: 4–0
- Head coach: None
- Captain: Paul McLane
- Home stadium: Zoo Park, Hyde Park

1893 Southern college football independents records
	Conf.			Overall
Team	W	L	T	W		L		T
Maryland		–		6	–	0	–	0
Texas		–		4	–	0	–	0
Central (KY)		–		2	–	0	–	0
Howard		–		2	–	0	–	0
North Carolina A&M		–		2	–	0	–	0
Vanderbilt		–		6	–	1	–	0
Auburn		–		3	–	0	–	2
Virginia		–		8	–	2	–	0
Ole Miss		–		4	–	1	–	0
Centre		–		4	–	1	–	0
Trinity (NC)		–		3	–	1	–	0
VMI		–		3	–	1	–	0
Kentucky State College		–		5	–	2	–	1
Delaware		–		2	–	1	–	0
Georgia Tech		–		2	–	1	–	0
Guilford		–		2	–	1	–	0
West Virginia		–		2	–	1	–	0
William & Mary		–		2	–	1	–	0
Navy		–		5	–	3	–	0
Richmond		–		3	–	2	–	0
Georgetown		–		4	–	4	–	0
Sewanee		–		3	–	3	–	0
Furman		–		1	–	1	–	0
Georgia		–		2	–	2	–	1
Western Maryland		–		1	–	1	–	0
Johns Hopkins		–		2	–	3	–	2
North Carolina		–		3	–	4	–	0
Tennessee		–		2	–	4	–	0
Tulane		–		1	–	2	–	0
Wake Forest		–		1	–	2	–	0
Hampden–Sydney		–		0	–	1	–	0
LSU		–		0	–	1	–	0
Maryville (TN)		–		0	–	1	–	0
Mercer		–		0	–	1	–	0
Wofford		–		0	–	1	–	0
VAMC		–		0	–	2	–	0
Alabama		–		0	–	4	–	0

The 1893 Texas Varsity football team represented The University of Texas (now known as the University of Texas at Austin Longhorns) in the 1893 college football season. In Texas' first year of organized college football the team compiled a perfect 4–0 record, and outscored its opponents by a combined total of 98 to 16. The season included Texas' first ever college football game, an upset victory over the Dallas Foot Ball Club who had been considered the best team in the state.

The season began with a thanksgiving day game against the Dallas Foot Ball Club [sic], who had not been beaten since their formation in 1891. The 'Varsity prevailed 18–16 in a hard-fought contest, it was considered a major upset. Flush with victory the team scheduled two games against the best of the San Antonio club teams, who combined to form the San Antonio Town Team. Texas won the first game 30–0 on December 16 and the re-match 34–0 on February 3, 1894. In the final game of the season they hosted the Dallas club in Austin on February 22, whom they shutout 16–0 to finish the season undefeated.

== Background ==
The University of Texas had been established in 1883 and football on a intramural level was organized sporadically over the course of the next decade, the most significant attempts of which were a scrimmage against the Bickler Academy in December 1883 that more closely resembled rugby, and two clubs formed in 1891 who left no recorded history. Lack of success left the student body disinterested in the game in these early years, to the degree that hardly any athletics were played during the 1892-93 school year. By 1893 college football was well established in the East, but no organized collegiate teams yet existed in Texas. Various "town teams" had picked up the game in the years prior and scrimmaged each other, but the size of these teams and even what version of the game they played, varied wildly. Of these town teams the Dallas Foot Ball Club were the self-proclaimed "champions of Texas" having gone undefeated for several years. They had a reputation of being tough enough that none of the other teams in the state could stand up against them.

The origin of the first Longhorn football team can be traced to the return of Laredo natives Paul McLane and his brother Ray from the East where Paul had attended Columbia College, along with graduate student James Morrison who transferred from Hampden–Sydney College, in 1893. Paul McLane almost certainly learned the game from his time playing on the 1892 Columbia freshman squad. (Note: Columbia did not field a varsity squad in 1892, but did organize a freshman team. Paul's name can be found in student publications that prove he was at least involved with the team's end of season dinner. Additionally, he was erroneously referred to as R. McLean in other student publications that show he played during the season.) His brother Ray may have learned the game from him. Morrison was a native Virginian, and had attended Hampden–Sydney College there from 1888-1891 where he played the game (Note: The school did not organize a football team until a year later, so it is unknown how Morrison learned the game.). He moved to Austin to serve as secretary to his elderly uncle Robert Lewis Dabney who was by then professor of philosophy and political science at UT. These three men organized, trained, and lead the first team, and are considered the founders of Longhorn football.

Paul McLane, apparently the most knowledgeable about football, assumed the role of coach of the budding team who learned the techniques of the game during 4:30 pm daily practices. Practice was held at the northwest corner of campus behind the Chemistry Lab. On November 11 the team, bolstered by some non-student athletes and members of the Austin Athletic Club, participated in an intrasquad exhibition game in Austin. In a city of just 15,000 people around 700 showed up to the game and had to wait through a thirty minute delay while a student rode to town on horseback to retrieve a new ball when the first one was "too lovingly embraced by Al Jacks at the very commencement of the game" and burst. Jacks was a non-student and local Austin baseball figure. The outcome of the game was either a 6–6 tie (according to the literary magazine The Texas University), or called for darkness with the "select team" leading 10–2 (according to the Austin Daily Statesman). The Statesman declared "The boys proved themselves very expert and the coming national game from now on with be seen in Austin." Spectators apparently had a more mixed reaction to the game.

Also during the fall of 1893, the Dallas club, having heard of the formation of a football team at the state university, challenged the newcomers to a thanksgiving day game in Dallas, and a November 30 date was agreed to. The Texas team did not have the adequate funds to make the trip up, so an Austin haberdashery lent the team $100 and Peter Lawless, a ticket agent, supplied round-trip tickets. The team boldly arrived at 8:30 pm in Dallas. Billy Richardson recalled "When we got there, we all bought big cigars and strutted down Main Street." Fans accompanying the team to Dallas created Texas' first yell: Hullabaloo, hullabaloo, Ray, 'ray, 'ray. Hoo-ray, Hoo-ray. 'Varsity, 'varsity, U.T.A.

== Schedule ==
Date	Time	Opponent	Site	Result	Attendance	Source
November 30		at Dallas Athletic Club	Dallas Fair Grounds; Dallas, TX	W 18–16	2,000	
December 16		San Antonio Town Team	Zoo Park; Austin, TX	W 30–0	500–600	
February 3, 1894	4:15 p.m.	at San Antonio Town Team	Jockey Club Grounds; San Antonio, TX	W 34–0	500	
February 22, 1894	3:05 p.m.	Dallas Athletic Club	Hyde Park; Austin, TX	W 16–0		

== Game summaries ==
=== at Dallas Athletic Club ===
Texas vs. Dallas Athletic Club

Team	1	2	Total
• Texas	12	6	18
Dallas	10	6	16

- Date: November 30, 1893
- Location: Dallas Fair Grounds
  Dallas, Texas
- Game attendance: 2,000

On November 30 the Varsity team defeated the Dallas Athletic Club 18–16 at the Fair Grounds in Dallas in front of a crowd of around 2,000 people. Since football was a relatively new sport to the state, the Dallas club was considered the champions of the state and hadn't been beaten or scored against since their inception. Texas won the coin toss and scored a touchdown within 3 minutes which was promptly answered by Dallas with their own T.D. At some point Texas and Dallas both scored again but Dallas failed on their conversion attempt. Since at the time touchdowns were worth 4 points and PATs worth 2; the score at the end of the first half stood 12–10 with Texas in the lead. Both teams scored one touchdown in the second half in what was described as "sharp and close playing" to bring the final score to 18–16. Following the victory Texas was declared the "Champion eleven of Texas".

=== San Antonio Town Team ===
Texas vs. San Antonio Town Team

Team	1	2	Total
San Antonio	0	0	0
• Texas	12	18	30

- Date: December 16, 1893
- Location: Zoo Park
  Austin, Texas
- Game start: 3:00 PM CST
- Game attendance: 500–600

On December 16 the Varsity team beat the San Antonio Town Team 30–0 at Zoo Park in Austin. San Antonio won the toss and made a "brilliant run" that brought them to the Texas 25 but turned the ball over on downs. Texas then scored a touchdown after a slow drive downfield. San Antonio turned the ball over again on downs and Texas almost lost it on a fumble, but John Myers recovered. Texas' James Morrison scored the second touchdown to bring the score to 12–0 near the end of the half.

Texas received the ball to start the second half and drove down to the Town Teams' endzone but fumbled and San Antonio lost it on a safety, they drove down to their 25 but turned the ball over again and Texas scored their third touchdown but failed on the extra point, Texas 16–0. Throughout the game San Antonio had only been running the wedge play and as the Texas' defensive front adjusted they were more successful at stopping it, they got the ball back and Ray Mclane fumbled the ball just before the S.A. endzone after a 45 yard run San Antonio again jumped on it and got another safety, then got stopped on their 25. Texas scored two more touchdowns and missed one of the extra points to make the final score 30–0.

=== at San Antonio Town Team ===
Texas at San Antonio Town Team

Team	1	2	Total
• Texas	16	18	34
San Antonio	0	0	0

- Date: February 3, 1894
- Location: Jockey Club Grounds
  San Antonio, Texas
- Game start: 4:15 PM CST
- Game attendance: 500

On February 3 of 1894 the Varsity team again beat the San Antonio Town Team, this time 34–0 at the Jockey Club Grounds in San Antonio. The game was viewed by a crowd of about 500; which was "largely composed of the society element of both Austin and San Antonio". San Antonio's primary formation again was the Flying Wedge but they lacked cohesion and Texas remained in control of the game, apart from a few missed extra points, with their superior rushing game.

=== Dallas Athletic Club ===
On February 22 of 1894 the Varsity team again beat the Dallas Athletic Club, this time 16–0 at Hyde Park in Austin.

== Personnel ==
The team, like all other college football teams at the time, operated under the one-platoon system which did not include separate offensive and defensive units and rarely utilized substitutions. The basic formation of five linemen, two ends, two halfbacks, one fullback and one quarterback, was the standard Texas offense for several decades onward.

Lettermen

Player	Position	Games started	Home town	Weight	Age	Class	Prep School	Notes
Charles Bennett	Tackle	2	Helena, Texas		24	Law '95		(Note: Charles Dickson Bennett's first cousin Hugh Bennett Ruckman was a member of UT's 1901 football team years later.)
Addison Perry Day	Fullback	4	Ballinger, Texas	150	20	Lit. '97		
David S. Furman	Halfback	4	Belton, Texas	140	19	Anly. '96	Belton High School	
Richard Unett Lee	Halfback, QB	3	Austin, Texas	135	20	Law '95		(Note: Regarded as one of the best athletes at UT during his time there, Lee played baseball and ran track in addition to football. While practicing for the pole vault competition at UT's upcoming field day in April of 1894 he was injured and developed an unspecified illness, passing away on September 22, 1894, at the age of 21.)
Billy Richardson	Guard	1	Mexia, Texas	165	19		Mexia High School	(Note: William Henry Richardson's head injury in the second Dallas game left him in the hospital when the 1893 team picture was taken, and erroneously left off the retroactive Letterman list until 1933.)
Paul McLane	End	3	Laredo, Texas	170	19	Engi. '97	Columbia College	(Note: Paul McLane (1874-1897) did not return to UT the next year, but he played one more time in an exhibition game against Missouri after the end of the 1896 season, as the team had several injured players and was shorthanded. He died a few months later in his hometown of Laredo on April 21, 1897.)
Ray McLane	End	4	Laredo, Texas	160	17	Engi. '97		(Note: Ray McLane (born 1876) was the last surviving member of the 1893 team when he passed away in 1960 at the age of eighty-four.)
William P. McLean	Quarterback	3	Mount Pleasant, Texas	135	21	Law '95	Southwestern Presbyterian	
Victor C. Moore	Guard	3	Austin, Texas		19	Lit. '97	The Webb School	
James Morrison	Tackle, End	3	Lexington, VA	175	22	Bio./Chem. (P.G.)	Hampden–Sydney College	
John H. Myers	Center	4	Oakland, Texas	210	21	Law '95		
John W. Philp	Guard	4	Dallas, Texas	190	19	Law '95	Staunton Military Academy	(Note: John William Philp would later serve as the Republican nominee in the 1914 Texas gubernatorial election.)
Rob E.L. Roy	Tackle	4	Johnsons Station, Texas	150	24	Law '94	Southwestern University	

Substitutes

Player	Position	Games started	Home town	Weight	Age	Class	Prep School	Notes
Jesse Andrews		0	Waterproof, Louisiana		19	Lit. '95	Jefferson College	
Edward Batts		0	Bastrop, Texas		21	Sc. '97		
Ross L. Clark		0	Oak Cliff, Texas		21	Law '95	Grove's High School	
Bibb Graves		0	Hope Hull, Alabama		20	Law (P.G.)	University of Alabama	
Al Jacks	Halfback	1	Austin, Texas		23			
John F. Maverick		0	San Antonio, Texas		19	Engi. '97	San Antonio Academy	
Robert F. Turner		0	Monroe, North Carolina			Law '95		

Managers

- Walter J. Crawford, Analysis '94
- Albert Lefevre, Class of 1894

== Notes ==
Biographical
