= 1893 Kentucky State College Blue and White football team =

American college football season

1893 Kentucky State College Blue and White football
- Conference: Independent
- Record: 5–2–1
- Head coach: John A. Thompson (1st season)
- Captain: Ulysses Garred

1893 Southern college football independents records
	Conf.			Overall
Team	W	L	T	W		L		T
Maryland		–		6	–	0	–	0
Texas		–		4	–	0	–	0
Central (KY)		–		2	–	0	–	0
Howard		–		2	–	0	–	0
North Carolina A&M		–		2	–	0	–	0
Vanderbilt		–		6	–	1	–	0
Auburn		–		3	–	0	–	2
Virginia		–		8	–	2	–	0
Ole Miss		–		4	–	1	–	0
Centre		–		4	–	1	–	0
Trinity (NC)		–		3	–	1	–	0
VMI		–		3	–	1	–	0
Kentucky State College		–		5	–	2	–	1
Delaware		–		2	–	1	–	0
Georgia Tech		–		2	–	1	–	0
Guilford		–		2	–	1	–	0
West Virginia		–		2	–	1	–	0
William & Mary		–		2	–	1	–	0
Navy		–		5	–	3	–	0
Richmond		–		3	–	2	–	0
Georgetown		–		4	–	4	–	0
Sewanee		–		3	–	3	–	0
Furman		–		1	–	1	–	0
Georgia		–		2	–	2	–	1
Western Maryland		–		1	–	1	–	0
Johns Hopkins		–		2	–	3	–	2
North Carolina		–		3	–	4	–	0
Tennessee		–		2	–	4	–	0
Tulane		–		1	–	2	–	0
Wake Forest		–		1	–	2	–	0
Hampden–Sydney		–		0	–	1	–	0
LSU		–		0	–	1	–	0
Maryville (TN)		–		0	–	1	–	0
Mercer		–		0	–	1	–	0
Wofford		–		0	–	1	–	0
VAMC		–		0	–	2	–	0
Alabama		–		0	–	4	–	0

The 1893 Kentucky State College Blue and White football team represented Kentucky State College—now known as the University of Kentucky—as an independent during the 1893 college football season. Led by John A. Thompson in his first and only season as head coach, the Blue and White compiled a record of 5–2–1.

== Schedule ==
Date	Time	Opponent	Site	Result	Attendance	Source
October 14		Georgetown (KY)	Lexington, KY	W 80–0		
October 21		at Tennessee	Baseball Park; Knoxville, TN	W 56–0		
October 28		at Centre	Danville, KY (rivalry)	L 4–6		
November 4		Kentucky University	Lexington, KY	W 28–0		
November 11		Central (KY)	Lexington, KY	L 36–48		
November 18	3:00 p.m.	at Cincinnati YMCA	League Park; Cincinnati, OH	W 14–4	1,000	
November 25		Kentucky University	Lexington, KY	W 38–28		
November 30		Indiana	Lexington, KY (rivalry)	T 24–24		
All times are in Eastern time
