= 1893 Tennessee Volunteers football team =

American college football season

1893 Tennessee Volunteers football
- Conference: Independent
- Record: 2–5
- Head coach: None
- Captain: Howard Ijams
- Home stadium: Baseball Park

1893 Southern college football independents records
	Conf.			Overall
Team	W	L	T	W		L		T
Maryland		–		6	–	0	–	0
Texas		–		4	–	0	–	0
Central (KY)		–		2	–	0	–	0
Howard		–		2	–	0	–	0
North Carolina A&M		–		2	–	0	–	0
Vanderbilt		–		6	–	1	–	0
Auburn		–		3	–	0	–	2
Virginia		–		8	–	2	–	0
Ole Miss		–		4	–	1	–	0
Centre		–		4	–	1	–	0
Trinity (NC)		–		3	–	1	–	0
VMI		–		3	–	1	–	0
Kentucky State College		–		5	–	2	–	1
Delaware		–		2	–	1	–	0
Georgia Tech		–		2	–	1	–	0
Guilford		–		2	–	1	–	0
West Virginia		–		2	–	1	–	0
William & Mary		–		2	–	1	–	0
Navy		–		5	–	3	–	0
Richmond		–		3	–	2	–	0
Georgetown		–		4	–	4	–	0
Sewanee		–		3	–	3	–	0
Furman		–		1	–	1	–	0
Georgia		–		2	–	2	–	1
Western Maryland		–		1	–	1	–	0
Johns Hopkins		–		2	–	3	–	2
North Carolina		–		3	–	4	–	0
Tennessee		–		2	–	4	–	0
Tulane		–		1	–	2	–	0
Wake Forest		–		1	–	2	–	0
Hampden–Sydney		–		0	–	1	–	0
LSU		–		0	–	1	–	0
Maryville (TN)		–		0	–	1	–	0
Mercer		–		0	–	1	–	0
Wofford		–		0	–	1	–	0
VAMC		–		0	–	2	–	0
Alabama		–		0	–	4	–	0

The 1893 Tennessee Volunteers football team represented the University of Tennessee as an independent in the 1893 college football season. The 1893 season was Tennessee's third season as a varsity squad. A notable matchup for Tennessee came against Kentucky State College, later the University of Kentucky, in the first meeting of the two programs. The 1893 varsity team was to be the last until 1896 because the university "wanted to put emphasis on academics." The Vols went 2–5, losing the first five games.

== Schedule ==
Date	Opponent	Site	Result	Source
October 21	Kentucky State College	Baseball Park; Knoxville, TN (rivalry)	L 0–56	
November 3	at North Carolina	Chapel Hill, NC	L 0–60	
November 4	at Trinity (NC)	Trinity Field; Durham, NC	L 0–70	
November 6	at Wake Forest	Wake Forest, NC	L 0–64	
November 7	at North Carolina A&M	Raleigh, NC	L 6–12	
November 18	Maryville	Baseball Park; Knoxville, TN	W 32–0	
November 30	Asheville Athletic	Baseball Park; Knoxville, TN	W 12–6	
