= 1893 Centre football team =

American college football season

1893 Centre football
- Conference: Independent
- Record: 4–1
- Head coach: W. Durant Berry (3rd season)

1893 Southern college football independents records
	Conf.			Overall
Team	W	L	T	W		L		T
Maryland		–		6	–	0	–	0
Texas		–		4	–	0	–	0
Central (KY)		–		2	–	0	–	0
Howard		–		2	–	0	–	0
North Carolina A&M		–		2	–	0	–	0
Vanderbilt		–		6	–	1	–	0
Auburn		–		3	–	0	–	2
Virginia		–		8	–	2	–	0
Ole Miss		–		4	–	1	–	0
Centre		–		4	–	1	–	0
Trinity (NC)		–		3	–	1	–	0
VMI		–		3	–	1	–	0
Kentucky State College		–		5	–	2	–	1
Delaware		–		2	–	1	–	0
Georgia Tech		–		2	–	1	–	0
Guilford		–		2	–	1	–	0
West Virginia		–		2	–	1	–	0
William & Mary		–		2	–	1	–	0
Navy		–		5	–	3	–	0
Richmond		–		3	–	2	–	0
Georgetown		–		4	–	4	–	0
Sewanee		–		3	–	3	–	0
Furman		–		1	–	1	–	0
Georgia		–		2	–	2	–	1
Western Maryland		–		1	–	1	–	0
Johns Hopkins		–		2	–	3	–	2
North Carolina		–		3	–	4	–	0
Tennessee		–		2	–	4	–	0
Tulane		–		1	–	2	–	0
Wake Forest		–		1	–	2	–	0
Hampden–Sydney		–		0	–	1	–	0
LSU		–		0	–	1	–	0
Maryville (TN)		–		0	–	1	–	0
Mercer		–		0	–	1	–	0
Wofford		–		0	–	1	–	0
VAMC		–		0	–	2	–	0
Alabama		–		0	–	4	–	0

The 1893 Centre football team represented Centre College as an independent during the 1893 college football season. Led by W. Durant Berry in his third and final season as head coach, Centre compiled a record of 4–1.

== Schedule ==
Date	Opponent	Site	Result	Attendance	Source
October 14	Cincinnati	Danville, KY	W 18–0		
October 21	at Louisville Athletic Club	Louisville, KY	W 30–16		
October 28	Kentucky State College	Danville, KY (rivalry)	W 6–4		
November 11	at Louisville Athletic Club	Louisville, KY	W 12–8		
November 19	vs. Central (KY)	State College grounds; Lexington, KY	L 18–20	3,000	
