= Ijames =

Ijames is a surname. Notable people with the surname include:

- Claire Lillian Ijames (1889-after January 1932), American comedian and dancer better known as Florence Tempest
- Dwayne Ijames (born 1983), American football player
- James Ijames, American performer and playwright

== See also ==
- Ijams
