= 1893 Auburn Tigers football team =

American college football season

1893 Auburn Tigers football
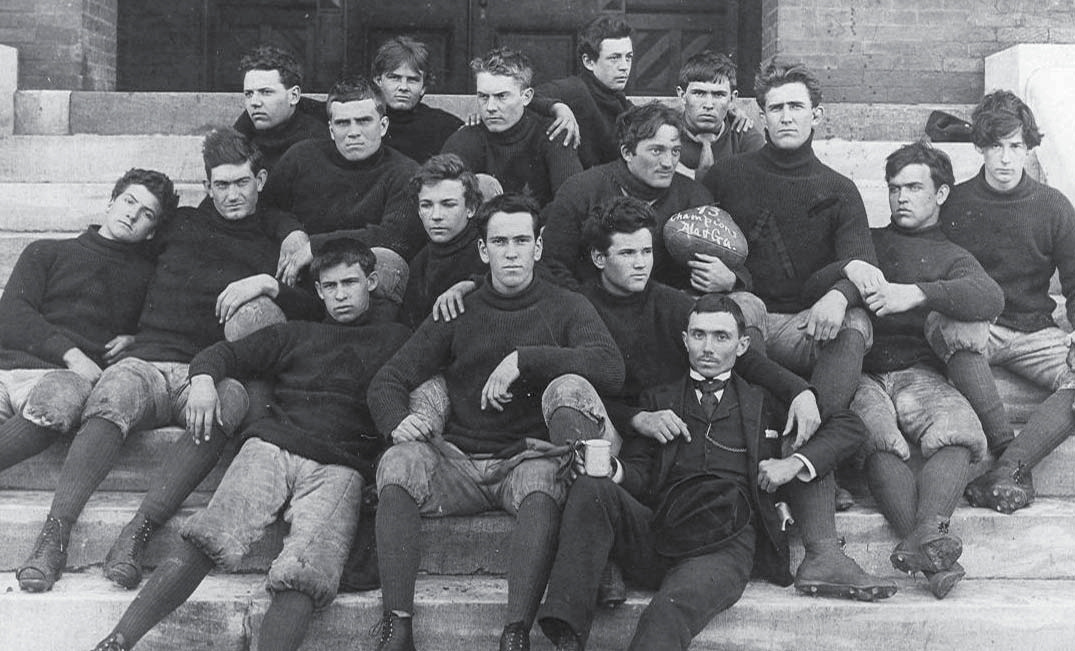
- The fall 1892 through spring 1893 football team of the Agricultural and Mechanical College of Alabama (now Auburn University).
- Conference: Independent
- Record: 3–1–1
- Head coach: D. M. Balliet (1st season; spring); George Roy Harvey (1st season; fall)
- Captains: Tom Daniels; Rufus T. "Dutch" Dorsey

1893 Southern college football independents records
	Conf.			Overall
Team	W	L	T	W		L		T
Maryland		–		6	–	0	–	0
Texas		–		4	–	0	–	0
Central (KY)		–		2	–	0	–	0
Howard		–		2	–	0	–	0
North Carolina A&M		–		2	–	0	–	0
Vanderbilt		–		6	–	1	–	0
Auburn		–		3	–	0	–	2
Virginia		–		8	–	2	–	0
Ole Miss		–		4	–	1	–	0
Centre		–		4	–	1	–	0
Trinity (NC)		–		3	–	1	–	0
VMI		–		3	–	1	–	0
Kentucky State College		–		5	–	2	–	1
Delaware		–		2	–	1	–	0
Georgia Tech		–		2	–	1	–	0
Guilford		–		2	–	1	–	0
West Virginia		–		2	–	1	–	0
William & Mary		–		2	–	1	–	0
Navy		–		5	–	3	–	0
Richmond		–		3	–	2	–	0
Georgetown		–		4	–	4	–	0
Sewanee		–		3	–	3	–	0
Furman		–		1	–	1	–	0
Georgia		–		2	–	2	–	1
Western Maryland		–		1	–	1	–	0
Johns Hopkins		–		2	–	3	–	2
North Carolina		–		3	–	4	–	0
Tennessee		–		2	–	4	–	0
Tulane		–		1	–	2	–	0
Wake Forest		–		1	–	2	–	0
Hampden–Sydney		–		0	–	1	–	0
LSU		–		0	–	1	–	0
Maryville (TN)		–		0	–	1	–	0
Mercer		–		0	–	1	–	0
Wofford		–		0	–	1	–	0
VAMC		–		0	–	2	–	0
Alabama		–		0	–	4	–	0

The 1893 Auburn Tigers football team represented Auburn University in the 1893 college football season. The squad finished with a record of 3–1–1 and outscored opponents 116–62.

Auburn, then known as the Agricultural and Mechanical College of Alabama, counts the February 22, 1893, game versus Alabama towards the 1893 season, while Alabama counts it toward their 1892 season. Head coach D. M. Balliet led Auburn to a 32–22 victory in the game. George Roy Harvey coached the four games that Auburn played the following fall.

== Schedule ==
Date	Time	Opponent	Site	Result	Attendance	Source
February 22		vs. Alabama	Lakeview Park; Birmingham, AL (rivalry)	W 32–22		
November 6	3:30 p.m.	Vanderbilt	Riverside Park; Montgomery, AL	W 30–10	2,000	
November 18		vs. Sewanee	Piedmont Park; Atlanta, GA	L 14–16		
November 30		vs. Alabama	Riverside Park; Montgomery, AL	W 40–16		
December 7		at Georgia Tech	Atlanta, GA (rivalry)	T 0–0		
All times are in Central time
