= 1893 Maryland Aggies football team =

American college football season

1893 Maryland Aggies football

Maryland state championship District of Columbia championship
- Conference: Independent
- Record: 6–0
- Head coach: Samuel Harding (1st season)
- Captain: Samuel Harding

1893 Southern college football independents records
	Conf.			Overall
Team	W	L	T	W		L		T
Maryland		–		6	–	0	–	0
Texas		–		4	–	0	–	0
Central (KY)		–		2	–	0	–	0
Howard		–		2	–	0	–	0
North Carolina A&M		–		2	–	0	–	0
Vanderbilt		–		6	–	1	–	0
Auburn		–		3	–	0	–	2
Virginia		–		8	–	2	–	0
Ole Miss		–		4	–	1	–	0
Centre		–		4	–	1	–	0
Trinity (NC)		–		3	–	1	–	0
VMI		–		3	–	1	–	0
Kentucky State College		–		5	–	2	–	1
Delaware		–		2	–	1	–	0
Georgia Tech		–		2	–	1	–	0
Guilford		–		2	–	1	–	0
West Virginia		–		2	–	1	–	0
William & Mary		–		2	–	1	–	0
Navy		–		5	–	3	–	0
Richmond		–		3	–	2	–	0
Georgetown		–		4	–	4	–	0
Sewanee		–		3	–	3	–	0
Furman		–		1	–	1	–	0
Georgia		–		2	–	2	–	1
Western Maryland		–		1	–	1	–	0
Johns Hopkins		–		2	–	3	–	2
North Carolina		–		3	–	4	–	0
Tennessee		–		2	–	4	–	0
Tulane		–		1	–	2	–	0
Wake Forest		–		1	–	2	–	0
Hampden–Sydney		–		0	–	1	–	0
LSU		–		0	–	1	–	0
Maryville (TN)		–		0	–	1	–	0
Mercer		–		0	–	1	–	0
Wofford		–		0	–	1	–	0
VAMC		–		0	–	2	–	0
Alabama		–		0	–	4	–	0

The 1893 Maryland Aggies football team represented the Maryland Agricultural College (now the University of Maryland) in the 1893 college football season. After losing all three of its games the previous season without scoring a point, Maryland showed considerable improvement in 1893. The Aggies defeated all six opponents and were named the District of Columbia and Maryland state champions.

== Schedule ==
Date	Opponent	Site	Result
October 12	Eastern High School		W 36–0
October 21	Central High School		W 10–0
October 26	Baltimore City College		W 18–0
November 1	St. John's (MD)		W 6–0
November 11	at Western Maryland	Westminster, MD	W 18–10
November 17	Orient Athletic Club		W 16–6

== Players ==
The letterwinners on the 1893 team were:

- J. G. Bannon, end: (May 1, 1874 – January 19, 1937) graduated with a B.S. through the Scientific Course in 1895. He was the son of Maryland State Senator Michael Bannon.
- Clifton E. Fuller, halfback/quarterback: (May 1, 1873 – September 3, 1958) a native of Cumberland, Maryland, he graduated in 1896. Fuller worked for many years as a freight agent for the Railway Express Agency in Cumberland and served one term as a city councilman. He attended every Maryland homecoming game in College Park between 1932 and 1957. He was a member of the Knights of the Golden Eagle.
- Gustavus Y. Graff, tackle: born January 30, 1865, a native of Montgomery County, Maryland, he graduated in 1893 with a B.S. in the Scientific Course and worked as a librarian at the college for one year. Graff then worked for the Bureau of Engraving and Printing in Washington, D.C.
- Samuel "Pop" Harding, tackle/guard: (January 19, 1873 – May 19, 1919) born in Highland, Maryland, he graduated with a B.S. through the Scientific Course in 1895. Harding worked for the Water Department in Washington, D.C., first as a skilled laborer and eventually working his way to the position of foreman.
- George Harris, quarterback
- Roland L. Harrison, halfback: born May 4, 1875, in Charlotte Hall, Maryland, he graduated with a B.S. through the Scientific Course in 1895. Harrison worked as a topographer for the U.S. Geological Survey.
- Parker Mitchell, center
- Fred Oertly, ?
- Pearse "Shorty" Prough, halfback/quarterback: (August 15, 1873 – March 29, 1952) he worked as a country squire near Sykesville, Maryland. Born to parents George Marion and Georgia Anna (née Choate) Prough, he married Mary née DeVeries on September 27, 1927, and the couple had two sons and two daughters.
- R. R. "Dick" Pue, guard/center and captain: he graduated with a B.S. through the Scientific Course in 1894 and died sometime before 1914.
- William T. L. "Sherman" Rollins, halfback: he graduated with a B.S. through the Scientific Course in 1896 and worked as a supervisor of the census and inspector for the Post Office in Seat Pleasant, Maryland.
- Henry Sherman, end
- Clay H. Weimer, fullback: born on August 5, 1874, in Bedford County, Pennsylvania, he graduated with a B.S. through the Scientific Course in 1894. He earned a Doctor of Medicine from the University of Pennsylvania in 1898 and worked as an assistant superintendent at the State Hospital in Ashland, Pennsylvania, beginning in 1898.
- Thomas Wharton, guard
- Arthur Wooters, end

Non-letterwinners:

- Dick Alvey, tackle
- W. B. "Will" Crapster, guard: born in 1873 and a native of Taneytown, Maryland, he graduated with a B.S. through the Scientific Course in 1895. Crapster worked as a manager of the Eureka Life Insurance Company in Washington, D.C. He married on April 19, 1913.
- Henry Harrison, guard
- Fred Lull, guard
- Howard Strickler, quarterback
- John Brock, halfback
- Barnes Compton, end: son of a wealthy Maryland plantation owner, he graduated in 1895 with a B.S. in the Scientific Course and became a clerk of the B&O Railroad. Compton died sometime before 1914.
- Arthur Pue Gorman Jr., guard
- Tom Greene, fullback

Manager:

- Sothoron Key: he graduated with a B.S. through the Scientific Course in 1894 and an M.S. in 1902. He worked as a physician in Washington, D.C.
