= 1893 Virginia Orange and Blue football team =

American college football season

1893 Virginia Orange and Blue football

Southern champion
- Conference: Independent
- Record: 8–3
- Head coach: Johnny Poe (1st season)
- Captain: John Penton
- Home stadium: Madison Hall Field

1893 Southern college football independents records
	Conf.			Overall
Team	W	L	T	W		L		T
Maryland		–		6	–	0	–	0
Texas		–		4	–	0	–	0
Central (KY)		–		2	–	0	–	0
Howard		–		2	–	0	–	0
North Carolina A&M		–		2	–	0	–	0
Vanderbilt		–		6	–	1	–	0
Auburn		–		3	–	0	–	2
Virginia		–		8	–	2	–	0
Ole Miss		–		4	–	1	–	0
Centre		–		4	–	1	–	0
Trinity (NC)		–		3	–	1	–	0
VMI		–		3	–	1	–	0
Kentucky State College		–		5	–	2	–	1
Delaware		–		2	–	1	–	0
Georgia Tech		–		2	–	1	–	0
Guilford		–		2	–	1	–	0
West Virginia		–		2	–	1	–	0
William & Mary		–		2	–	1	–	0
Navy		–		5	–	3	–	0
Richmond		–		3	–	2	–	0
Georgetown		–		4	–	4	–	0
Sewanee		–		3	–	3	–	0
Furman		–		1	–	1	–	0
Georgia		–		2	–	2	–	1
Western Maryland		–		1	–	1	–	0
Johns Hopkins		–		2	–	3	–	2
North Carolina		–		3	–	4	–	0
Tennessee		–		2	–	4	–	0
Tulane		–		1	–	2	–	0
Wake Forest		–		1	–	2	–	0
Hampden–Sydney		–		0	–	1	–	0
LSU		–		0	–	1	–	0
Maryville (TN)		–		0	–	1	–	0
Mercer		–		0	–	1	–	0
Wofford		–		0	–	1	–	0
VAMC		–		0	–	2	–	0
Alabama		–		0	–	4	–	0

The 1893 Virginia Orange and Blue football team represented the University of Virginia as an independent during the 1893 college football season. Led by first-year coach Johnny Poe, the team went 8–3 and claims a Southern championship.

== Schedule ==
Date	Time	Opponent	Site	Result	Attendance	Source
October 7		Richmond	Madison Hall Field; Charlottesville, VA	W 34–6		
October 14		Penn State	Madison Hall Field; Charlottesville, VA	L 0–6		
October 19		vs. Washington YMCA	Madison Hall Field; Charlottesville, VA	W 20–0		
October 21		at Navy	Worden Field; Annapolis, MD	L 0–28		
October 28		Johns Hopkins	Madison Hall Field; Charlottesville, VA	W 28–12		
November 4		Georgetown	Madison Hall Field; Charlottesville, VA	L 24–28		
November 11		vs. Trinity (NC)	Lynchburg, VA	W 30–0		
November 18		at Georgetown	National Park; Washington, DC	W 58–0	1,500	
November 22		at Navy	Worden Field; Annapolis, MD	W 12–0		
November 25		at VMI	Lexington, VA	W 22–0		
November 30	2:00 p.m.	vs. North Carolina	Island Park; Richmond, VA (rivalry)	W 16–0	3,500–4,000	
All times are in Eastern time
