= Ijams =

Ijams is a surname. Notable people with the surname include:

- E. H. Ijams (1886–1982), American Christian minister and academic administrator
- Howard Ijams (1873–1923), American football player and physician
