= 1893 West Virginia Mountaineers football team =

American college football season

1893 West Virginia Mountaineers football
- Conference: Independent
- Record: 2–1
- Head coach: F. William Rane (1st season)
- Captain: Harry M. Leps

1893 Southern college football independents records
	Conf.			Overall
Team	W	L	T	W		L		T
Maryland		–		6	–	0	–	0
Texas		–		4	–	0	–	0
Central (KY)		–		2	–	0	–	0
Howard		–		2	–	0	–	0
North Carolina A&M		–		2	–	0	–	0
Vanderbilt		–		6	–	1	–	0
Auburn		–		3	–	0	–	2
Virginia		–		8	–	2	–	0
Ole Miss		–		4	–	1	–	0
Centre		–		4	–	1	–	0
Trinity (NC)		–		3	–	1	–	0
VMI		–		3	–	1	–	0
Kentucky State College		–		5	–	2	–	1
Delaware		–		2	–	1	–	0
Georgia Tech		–		2	–	1	–	0
Guilford		–		2	–	1	–	0
West Virginia		–		2	–	1	–	0
William & Mary		–		2	–	1	–	0
Navy		–		5	–	3	–	0
Richmond		–		3	–	2	–	0
Georgetown		–		4	–	4	–	0
Sewanee		–		3	–	3	–	0
Furman		–		1	–	1	–	0
Georgia		–		2	–	2	–	1
Western Maryland		–		1	–	1	–	0
Johns Hopkins		–		2	–	3	–	2
North Carolina		–		3	–	4	–	0
Tennessee		–		2	–	4	–	0
Tulane		–		1	–	2	–	0
Wake Forest		–		1	–	2	–	0
Hampden–Sydney		–		0	–	1	–	0
LSU		–		0	–	1	–	0
Maryville (TN)		–		0	–	1	–	0
Mercer		–		0	–	1	–	0
Wofford		–		0	–	1	–	0
VAMC		–		0	–	2	–	0
Alabama		–		0	–	4	–	0

The 1893 West Virginia Mountaineers football team represented West Virginia University in the 1893 college football season. Led by F. William Rane in his first year, the Mountaineers finished the season with a record of two wins and one loss (2–1).

== Schedule ==
Date	Opponent	Site	Result
October 7	at Mt. Pleasant	Mt. Pleasant, PA	W 12–0
November 25	at Uniontown Independents	Uniontown, PA	W 12–2
November 30	at Washington & Jefferson	Fairgrounds; Washington, PA	L 0–56

== Players ==
The 1893 roster featured fourteen lettermen.

- William Baker, Elkins, West Virginia
- William Bambick
- Alpheus Edward Boyd, Uniontown, Pennsylvania - End
- Wilford Hayes
- Josiah Keely
- Roy Knox
- George H. A. Kunst, Pruntytown, West Virginia - Guard
- Henry M. Leps
- Jacob Linn
- Forney Miller, Dunkard, Pennsylvania
- E. Bunker Reynolds
- Walter South - Halfback
- Walton Venerable
- Henry White, Camden, West Virginia - Tackle
