= 1893 Richmond Spiders football team =

American college football season

1893 Richmond Spiders football
- Conference: Independent
- Record: 3–2
- Head coach: Dana Rucker (2nd season)
- Captain: Frank W. Duke
- Home stadium: Island Park

1893 Southern college football independents records
	Conf.			Overall
Team	W	L	T	W		L		T
Maryland		–		6	–	0	–	0
Texas		–		4	–	0	–	0
Central (KY)		–		2	–	0	–	0
Howard		–		2	–	0	–	0
North Carolina A&M		–		2	–	0	–	0
Vanderbilt		–		6	–	1	–	0
Auburn		–		3	–	0	–	2
Virginia		–		8	–	2	–	0
Ole Miss		–		4	–	1	–	0
Centre		–		4	–	1	–	0
Trinity (NC)		–		3	–	1	–	0
VMI		–		3	–	1	–	0
Kentucky State College		–		5	–	2	–	1
Delaware		–		2	–	1	–	0
Georgia Tech		–		2	–	1	–	0
Guilford		–		2	–	1	–	0
West Virginia		–		2	–	1	–	0
William & Mary		–		2	–	1	–	0
Navy		–		5	–	3	–	0
Richmond		–		3	–	2	–	0
Georgetown		–		4	–	4	–	0
Sewanee		–		3	–	3	–	0
Furman		–		1	–	1	–	0
Georgia		–		2	–	2	–	1
Western Maryland		–		1	–	1	–	0
Johns Hopkins		–		2	–	3	–	2
North Carolina		–		3	–	4	–	0
Tennessee		–		2	–	4	–	0
Tulane		–		1	–	2	–	0
Wake Forest		–		1	–	2	–	0
Hampden–Sydney		–		0	–	1	–	0
LSU		–		0	–	1	–	0
Maryville (TN)		–		0	–	1	–	0
Mercer		–		0	–	1	–	0
Wofford		–		0	–	1	–	0
VAMC		–		0	–	2	–	0
Alabama		–		0	–	4	–	0

The 1893 Richmond Colts football team was an American football team that represented Richmond College—now known as the University of Richmond—as an independent during the 1893 college football season. Dana Rucker returned for his second year as head coach, having helmed the team in 1891. Richmond compiled a record of 3–2.

== Schedule ==
Date	Opponent	Site	Result	Attendance	Source
September 30	Capitol City A.C.	Island Park; Richmond, VA	W 22–0		
October 7	at Virginia	Madison Hall Field; Charlottesville, VA	L 6–34		
November 11	at VMI	Lexington, VA (rivalry)	L 0–34		
November 13	vs. Allegheny Institute	Roanoke, VA	W 24–4		
November 18	Randolph–Macon	Island Park; Richmond, VA	W 12–0	300	
