= 1893 Georgetown football team =

American college football season

1893 Georgetown football
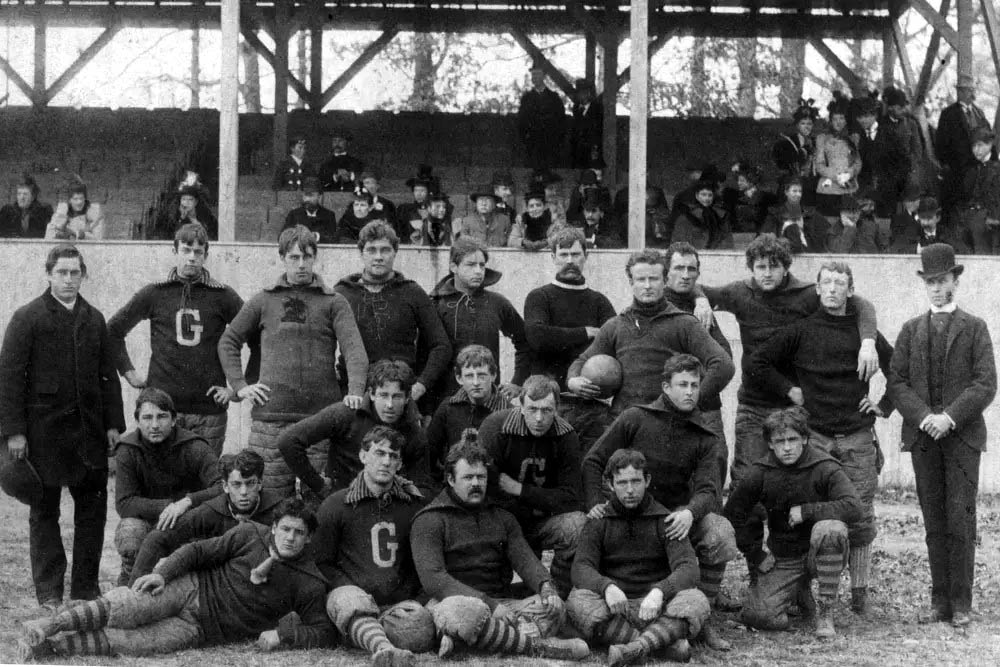
- Conference: Independent
- Record: 4–4
- Head coach: Dick Harley (1st season)
- Home stadium: Boundary Field

1893 Southern college football independents records
	Conf.			Overall
Team	W	L	T	W		L		T
Maryland		–		6	–	0	–	0
Texas		–		4	–	0	–	0
Central (KY)		–		2	–	0	–	0
Howard		–		2	–	0	–	0
North Carolina A&M		–		2	–	0	–	0
Vanderbilt		–		6	–	1	–	0
Auburn		–		3	–	0	–	2
Virginia		–		8	–	2	–	0
Ole Miss		–		4	–	1	–	0
Centre		–		4	–	1	–	0
Trinity (NC)		–		3	–	1	–	0
VMI		–		3	–	1	–	0
Kentucky State College		–		5	–	2	–	1
Delaware		–		2	–	1	–	0
Georgia Tech		–		2	–	1	–	0
Guilford		–		2	–	1	–	0
West Virginia		–		2	–	1	–	0
William & Mary		–		2	–	1	–	0
Navy		–		5	–	3	–	0
Richmond		–		3	–	2	–	0
Georgetown		–		4	–	4	–	0
Sewanee		–		3	–	3	–	0
Furman		–		1	–	1	–	0
Georgia		–		2	–	2	–	1
Western Maryland		–		1	–	1	–	0
Johns Hopkins		–		2	–	3	–	2
North Carolina		–		3	–	4	–	0
Tennessee		–		2	–	4	–	0
Tulane		–		1	–	2	–	0
Wake Forest		–		1	–	2	–	0
Hampden–Sydney		–		0	–	1	–	0
LSU		–		0	–	1	–	0
Maryville (TN)		–		0	–	1	–	0
Mercer		–		0	–	1	–	0
Wofford		–		0	–	1	–	0
VAMC		–		0	–	2	–	0
Alabama		–		0	–	4	–	0

The 1893 Georgetown football team represented the Georgetown University during the 1893 college football season. Georgetown finished the season with a 4–4 record. Dick Harley served as player-coach. They played home games at Boundary Field.

== Schedule ==
Date	Opponent	Site	Result	Attendance	Source
October 10	Penn	Boundary Field; Washington, DC	L 0–12		
October 14	Washington YMCA	Boundary Field; Washington, DC	W 16–0		
October 21	Swarthmore	Boundary Field; Washington, DC	W 34–10	7,000	
October 25	Washington YMCA	Boundary Field; Washington, DC	W 10–8		
November 4	at Virginia	Madison Hall Field; Charlottesville, VA	W 28–24		
November 11	at Navy	Worden Field; Annapolis, MD	L 10–22		
November 17	Virginia	Boundary Field; Washington, DC	L 0–58	1,500	
November 30	Columbia Athletic Club	Boundary Field; Washington, DC	L 16–40	7,000	
