= 1893 Ole Miss Rebels football team =

American college football season

1893 Ole Miss Rebels football
- Conference: Independent
- Record: 4–1
- Head coach: Alexander Bondurant (1st season)
- Captain: Alfred H. Roudebush

1893 Southern college football independents records
	Conf.			Overall
Team	W	L	T	W		L		T
Maryland		–		6	–	0	–	0
Texas		–		4	–	0	–	0
Central (KY)		–		2	–	0	–	0
Howard		–		2	–	0	–	0
North Carolina A&M		–		2	–	0	–	0
Vanderbilt		–		6	–	1	–	0
Auburn		–		3	–	0	–	2
Virginia		–		8	–	2	–	0
Ole Miss		–		4	–	1	–	0
Centre		–		4	–	1	–	0
Trinity (NC)		–		3	–	1	–	0
VMI		–		3	–	1	–	0
Kentucky State College		–		5	–	2	–	1
Delaware		–		2	–	1	–	0
Georgia Tech		–		2	–	1	–	0
Guilford		–		2	–	1	–	0
West Virginia		–		2	–	1	–	0
William & Mary		–		2	–	1	–	0
Navy		–		5	–	3	–	0
Richmond		–		3	–	2	–	0
Georgetown		–		4	–	4	–	0
Sewanee		–		3	–	3	–	0
Furman		–		1	–	1	–	0
Georgia		–		2	–	2	–	1
Western Maryland		–		1	–	1	–	0
Johns Hopkins		–		2	–	3	–	2
North Carolina		–		3	–	4	–	0
Tennessee		–		2	–	4	–	0
Tulane		–		1	–	2	–	0
Wake Forest		–		1	–	2	–	0
Hampden–Sydney		–		0	–	1	–	0
LSU		–		0	–	1	–	0
Maryville (TN)		–		0	–	1	–	0
Mercer		–		0	–	1	–	0
Wofford		–		0	–	1	–	0
VAMC		–		0	–	2	–	0
Alabama		–		0	–	4	–	0

The 1893 Ole Miss Rebels football team represented the University of Mississippi as an independent during the 1893 college football season. Led by Alexander Bondurant in his first and only season as head coach, Ole Miss compiled a record of 4–1.

== Schedule ==
Date	Opponent	Site	Result	Attendance	Source
November 11	Southwestern Baptist	Oxford, MS	W 56–0	500	
November 18	at Memphis Athletic Club	Citizens' Baseball Park; Memphis, TN	W 16–0		
November 25	vs. Southwestern Baptist	Jackson, MS	W 30–0		
November 30	at Southern Athletic Club	Sportsman's Park; New Orleans, LA	L 0–24	3,000	
December 2	at Tulane	Sportsman's Park; New Orleans, LA (rivalry)	W 12–4		
