= 1893 North Carolina Tar Heels football team =

American college football season

1893 North Carolina Tar Heels football
- Conference: Independent
- Record: 3–4
- Head coach: William J. "Yup" Cook (1st season)
- Captain: A. S. Bernard
- Home stadium: Campus Athletic Field (I)

1893 Southern college football independents records
	Conf.			Overall
Team	W	L	T	W		L		T
Maryland		–		6	–	0	–	0
Texas		–		4	–	0	–	0
Central (KY)		–		2	–	0	–	0
Howard		–		2	–	0	–	0
North Carolina A&M		–		2	–	0	–	0
Vanderbilt		–		6	–	1	–	0
Auburn		–		3	–	0	–	2
Virginia		–		8	–	2	–	0
Ole Miss		–		4	–	1	–	0
Centre		–		4	–	1	–	0
Trinity (NC)		–		3	–	1	–	0
VMI		–		3	–	1	–	0
Kentucky State College		–		5	–	2	–	1
Delaware		–		2	–	1	–	0
Georgia Tech		–		2	–	1	–	0
Guilford		–		2	–	1	–	0
West Virginia		–		2	–	1	–	0
William & Mary		–		2	–	1	–	0
Navy		–		5	–	3	–	0
Richmond		–		3	–	2	–	0
Georgetown		–		4	–	4	–	0
Sewanee		–		3	–	3	–	0
Furman		–		1	–	1	–	0
Georgia		–		2	–	2	–	1
Western Maryland		–		1	–	1	–	0
Johns Hopkins		–		2	–	3	–	2
North Carolina		–		3	–	4	–	0
Tennessee		–		2	–	4	–	0
Tulane		–		1	–	2	–	0
Wake Forest		–		1	–	2	–	0
Hampden–Sydney		–		0	–	1	–	0
LSU		–		0	–	1	–	0
Maryville (TN)		–		0	–	1	–	0
Mercer		–		0	–	1	–	0
Wofford		–		0	–	1	–	0
VAMC		–		0	–	2	–	0
Alabama		–		0	–	4	–	0

The 1893 North Carolina Tar Heels football team represented the University of North Carolina in the 1893 college football season. They played seven games with a final record of 3–4. The team captain for the 1893 season was A. S. Bernard. William J. "Yup" Cook (Princeton '89) was hired as the first full-time coach.

This was the first Carolina football team to wear the varsity sweater with the familiar monogram 'NC'.

== Schedule ==
Date	Time	Opponent	Site	Result	Attendance	Source
October 20	4:15 p.m.	at Washington and Lee	University Grounds; Lexington, VA	W 44–0	525	
October 21	3:20 p.m.	at VMI	Parade Grounds; Lexington, VA	L 4–10	625	
October 28	3:30 p.m.	at Trinity (NC)	Trinity Park; Durham, NC (rivalry)	L 4–6		
November 3		Tennessee	Campus Athletic Field (I); Chapel Hill, NC	W 60–0		
November 18	2:45 p.m.	vs. Wake Forest	Athletic Park (Raleigh); Raleigh, NC (rivalry)	W 40–0		
November 25	2:30 p.m.	vs. Lehigh	Manhattan Field; New York, NY	L 0–34	200	
November 30	2:15 p.m.	vs. Virginia	Island Park; Richmond, VA (rivalry)	L 0–16	3,500–4,000	
