= 1893 Sewanee Tigers football team =

American college football season

1893 Sewanee Tigers football
- Conference: Independent
- Record: 3–3
- Head coach: F. G. Sweat (3rd season)
- Home stadium: Hardee Field

1893 Southern college football independents records
	Conf.			Overall
Team	W	L	T	W		L		T
Maryland		–		6	–	0	–	0
Texas		–		4	–	0	–	0
Central (KY)		–		2	–	0	–	0
Howard		–		2	–	0	–	0
North Carolina A&M		–		2	–	0	–	0
Vanderbilt		–		6	–	1	–	0
Auburn		–		3	–	0	–	2
Virginia		–		8	–	2	–	0
Ole Miss		–		4	–	1	–	0
Centre		–		4	–	1	–	0
Trinity (NC)		–		3	–	1	–	0
VMI		–		3	–	1	–	0
Kentucky State College		–		5	–	2	–	1
Delaware		–		2	–	1	–	0
Georgia Tech		–		2	–	1	–	0
Guilford		–		2	–	1	–	0
West Virginia		–		2	–	1	–	0
William & Mary		–		2	–	1	–	0
Navy		–		5	–	3	–	0
Richmond		–		3	–	2	–	0
Georgetown		–		4	–	4	–	0
Sewanee		–		3	–	3	–	0
Furman		–		1	–	1	–	0
Georgia		–		2	–	2	–	1
Western Maryland		–		1	–	1	–	0
Johns Hopkins		–		2	–	3	–	2
North Carolina		–		3	–	4	–	0
Tennessee		–		2	–	4	–	0
Tulane		–		1	–	2	–	0
Wake Forest		–		1	–	2	–	0
Hampden–Sydney		–		0	–	1	–	0
LSU		–		0	–	1	–	0
Maryville (TN)		–		0	–	1	–	0
Mercer		–		0	–	1	–	0
Wofford		–		0	–	1	–	0
VAMC		–		0	–	2	–	0
Alabama		–		0	–	4	–	0

The 1893 Sewanee Tigers football team represented the Sewanee Tigers of Sewanee: The University of the South in the 1893 college football season.

== Schedule ==
Date	Time	Opponent	Site	Result	Attendance	Source
October 28		Vanderbilt	Hardee Field; Sewanee, TN (rivalry)	L 8–10		
November 6		at Louisville Athletic Club	Louisville, KY	L 10–12		
November 11		at Alabama	Lakeview Park; Birmingham, AL	W 20–0		
November 13		at Birmingham Athletic Club	Birmingham, AL	W 32–0		
November 18		vs. Auburn	Piedmont Park; Atlanta, GA	W 16–14		
November 30	2:30 p.m.	at Vanderbilt	Dudley Field; Nashville, TN	L 0–10	3,000	
All times are in Central time
