= 1893 Georgia Tech football team =

American college football season

1893 Georgia Tech football
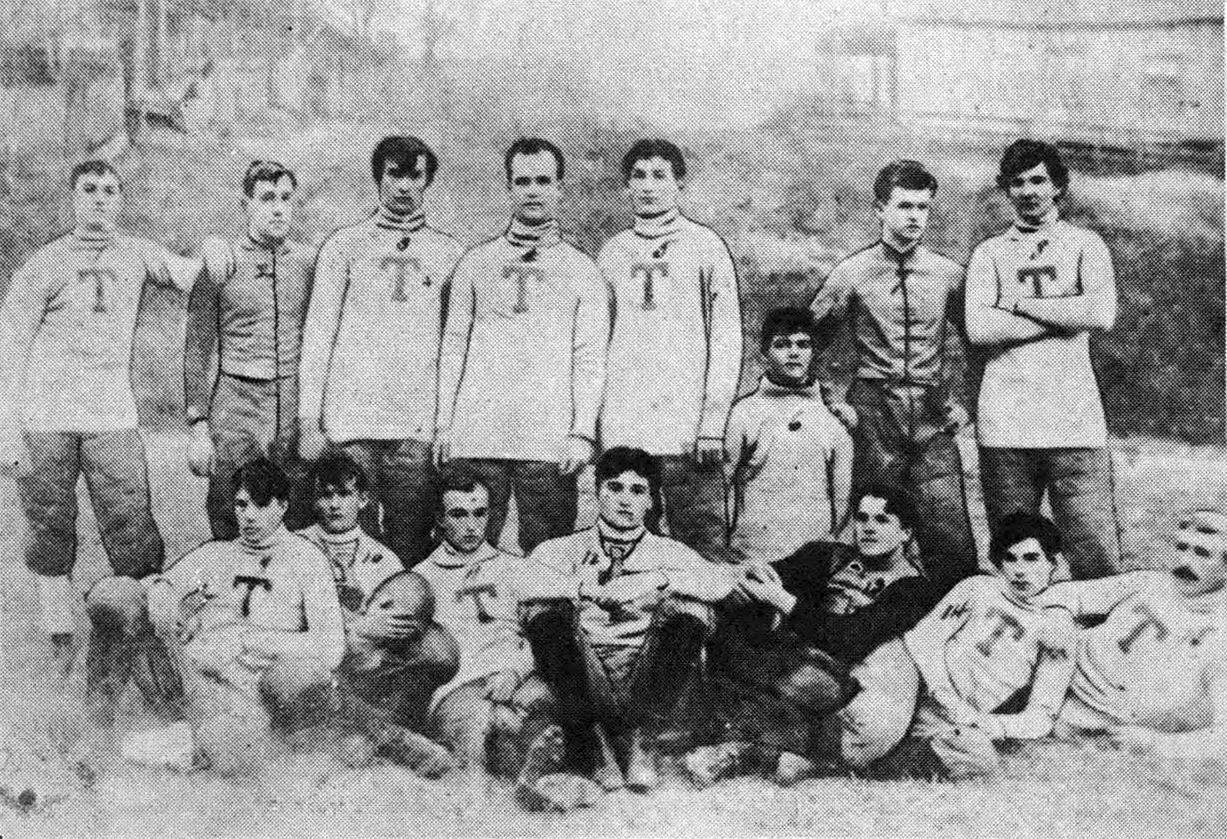
- Conference: Independent
- Record: 2–1–0
- Head coach: Leonard Wood (1st season)
- Captain: Will Hunter
- Home stadium: Piedmont Park

1893 Southern college football independents records
	Conf.			Overall
Team	W	L	T	W		L		T
Maryland		–		6	–	0	–	0
Texas		–		4	–	0	–	0
Central (KY)		–		2	–	0	–	0
Howard		–		2	–	0	–	0
North Carolina A&M		–		2	–	0	–	0
Vanderbilt		–		6	–	1	–	0
Auburn		–		3	–	0	–	2
Virginia		–		8	–	2	–	0
Ole Miss		–		4	–	1	–	0
Centre		–		4	–	1	–	0
Trinity (NC)		–		3	–	1	–	0
VMI		–		3	–	1	–	0
Kentucky State College		–		5	–	2	–	1
Delaware		–		2	–	1	–	0
Georgia Tech		–		2	–	1	–	0
Guilford		–		2	–	1	–	0
West Virginia		–		2	–	1	–	0
William & Mary		–		2	–	1	–	0
Navy		–		5	–	3	–	0
Richmond		–		3	–	2	–	0
Georgetown		–		4	–	4	–	0
Sewanee		–		3	–	3	–	0
Furman		–		1	–	1	–	0
Georgia		–		2	–	2	–	1
Western Maryland		–		1	–	1	–	0
Johns Hopkins		–		2	–	3	–	2
North Carolina		–		3	–	4	–	0
Tennessee		–		2	–	4	–	0
Tulane		–		1	–	2	–	0
Wake Forest		–		1	–	2	–	0
Hampden–Sydney		–		0	–	1	–	0
LSU		–		0	–	1	–	0
Maryville (TN)		–		0	–	1	–	0
Mercer		–		0	–	1	–	0
Wofford		–		0	–	1	–	0
VAMC		–		0	–	2	–	0
Alabama		–		0	–	4	–	0

The 1893 Georgia Tech football team represented the Georgia School of Technology during the 1893 college football season. It was the team's second season and included its first ever victory. The Techs, as the local papers referred to the team, finished with a record of 2–1–0, including against Georgia in the first iteration of the rivalry that would become known as Clean, Old-Fashioned Hate.

Leonard Wood, a 33-year-old Post Surgeon at Fort McPherson, enrolled at Georgia Tech by taking a special course in the wood shop and soon began organizing a university football team. He would serve as a player-coach and became the star of the team. Wood and Ernest Nourse, the teams' trainer, selected and trained the team. Adjunct math professor Frank Spain, Arthur Solomon, and William Mealor, the team manager, raised money for the '93 Football Association by offering shares of stock at $2.50 a share. The stock owners made 100% profit on their investment.

Will Hunter, member of the 1892 team was named team captain. Uniforms were provided by the Clarke Hardware Company, who also, ironically, provided uniforms for the Georgia Team. As football uniforms were still in a primitive state at that time, there was little padding besides a leather nose cover and players would grow their hair out to cushion their heads against thrown objects or the hard clay. As there was no established field on Georgia Tech's campus, Tech's lone home game was played at Piedmont Park in Atlanta, Georgia. With wins over in-state rivals Georgia and Mercer (avenging its 1892 loss), the season was considered memorable.

Georgia Tech's colors during the year were yellow and white. Fans created a standard cheer to be yelled out during the game:

  Tech–i–ty–tech!
  Hoo–Rex!–Hoo–Rex!
  Boom–Rah!–Boom–Rah!
  Georgia!

During the 40th anniversary of the season, a memorial plaque honoring Wood, a Medal of Honor recipient who later became U.S. Army Chief of Staff and governor of Cuba and the Philippines, was unveiled at Grant Field on November 25, 1933.

== Schedule ==
Date	Time	Opponent	Site	Result	Attendance	Source
November 4	3:15 p.m.	at Georgia	Alumni Athletic Field; Athens, GA (rivalry)	W 28–6		
November 30	3:00 p.m.	Saint Albans	Piedmont Park; Atlanta, GA	L 0–6	2,000	
December 16 (Note: The Georgia Tech football information media guide erroneously lists the Mercer game as occurring on November 11, 1893, in Atlanta.)	3:00 p.m.	at Mercer	Central City Park; Macon, GA	W 10–6	500	
All times are in Eastern time

Note: (Note: The Georgia Tech football information guide lists a fourth game of the season, a 0-0 tie against Auburn on December 7 at Brisbine Park in Atlanta. There is no mention of this game in the press and no game had been scheduled with Auburn at least as late as November 1. Georgia Tech's 1893 team manager, William Mealor, later said that Georgia Tech only played in three games during the 1893 season (Mercer, Georgia, and Saint Albans). It appears that the media guide lists the Auburn game in error.)

Georgia Tech manager William Mealor traveled to Athens on December 11 to organize a second game with Georgia, but Georgia had already been planning to disband its team for the season. Georgia's manager was not able to give a firm answer, and a second game between the teams never materialized.

== Game summaries ==
Georgia Tech Techs (0–0–0) at Georgia Bulldogs (0–0–0)

Quarter	1	2	Total
Georgia Tech	18	10	28
Georgia	0	6	6

at Alumni Athletic Field • Athens, Georgia

- Date: Saturday, November 4, 1893
- Game time: 3:15 p.m.
- Game attendance: "A large crowd"

The first game of the season also marked the first game in the iconic Georgia Tech-Georgia rivalry. In preparation for the game, Georgia Tech played a scrimmage in front of a large crowd the day before. The Georgia Tech students engaged a special train to take the fans to Athens and sold round-trip tickets to the game for $2.20. This train was involved in an accident on the return journey when it ran into a freight train sitting on the track. No lives were lost, but the passengers, including future Georgia Tech President, Lyman Hall, did not make it back into Atlanta until after midnight.

The game was played on the Alumni Athletic Field at the Georgia campus and began at 3:15 p.m.. Only thirty minute halves were used. The first half showed a significant size advantage for Georgia Tech and the Techs ran nearly every play through the center. Wood, playing left guard, was described as being able to "handle his opposing guard, who was a much lighter man, almost as if he were a child". Georgia's captain, George Butler, would later praise Wood's play in saying that he was spectacular in every respect and that Georgia's defense could make no gains on Wood's part of the line. Butler said that "my guard was so humiliated at his inability to stop Wood that I could never get him to don a uniform again; he quit football thereafter and declined to have his picture taken with the squad." Tech scored three touchdowns in the first half and Georgia was held scoreless. Georgia played much better in the second half and used a "turtleback" formation, which Georgia Tech had not previously seen and was unable to stop it effectively. Nevertheless, Georgia Tech had increased its lead to 22-0 before Georgia scored a touchdown. The game ended with a score of 28–6.

The game was not without controversy. Ahead of the game, Georgia complained about the make-up of the Georgia Tech team, claiming that less than one-third of the Tech players were regular students of the school. Georgia accused Leonard Wood and Park Howell of not being serious students and enrolling at Georgia Tech just to play football. Likewise, Georgia Tech accused Georgia of playing a paid, professional trainer, which was against the rules. Georgia fans became upset upon learning that the game's umpire was the brother of Georgia Tech's right guard, Charles Nourse. The fans began heckling "Well, well, well, / Who can tell, / The Tech's umpire has cheated like Hell!" and the crowd kicked or struck him with a cane as he walked by. Georgia Tech also accused Georgia fans of throwing rocks and other items at the players, drawing a knife to intimidate one of the players, and purposefully drowning out their cheers with drums and cowbells. Following the game, the Atlanta paper advised that any team playing against Georgia in Athens should bring a police detachment for protection.

Nevertheless, in a showing of good sportsmanship, Butler led the Bulldogs in a cheer for Georgia Tech's victory. There were rumors that Georgia asked Wood and Nourse to play for their them in their upcoming game against Vanderbilt Auburn was said to have challenged the winner of the game to a match, but it does not appear that the game ever materialized.

Saint Albans Crimson (3–0–0) at Georgia Tech Techs (1–0–0)

Quarter	1	2	Total
Saint Albans	0	6	6
Georgia Tech	0	0	0

at Piedmont Park • Atlanta, Georgia

- Date: Thursday, November 30, 1893
- Game time: 3:00 p.m.
- Game attendance: 2,000

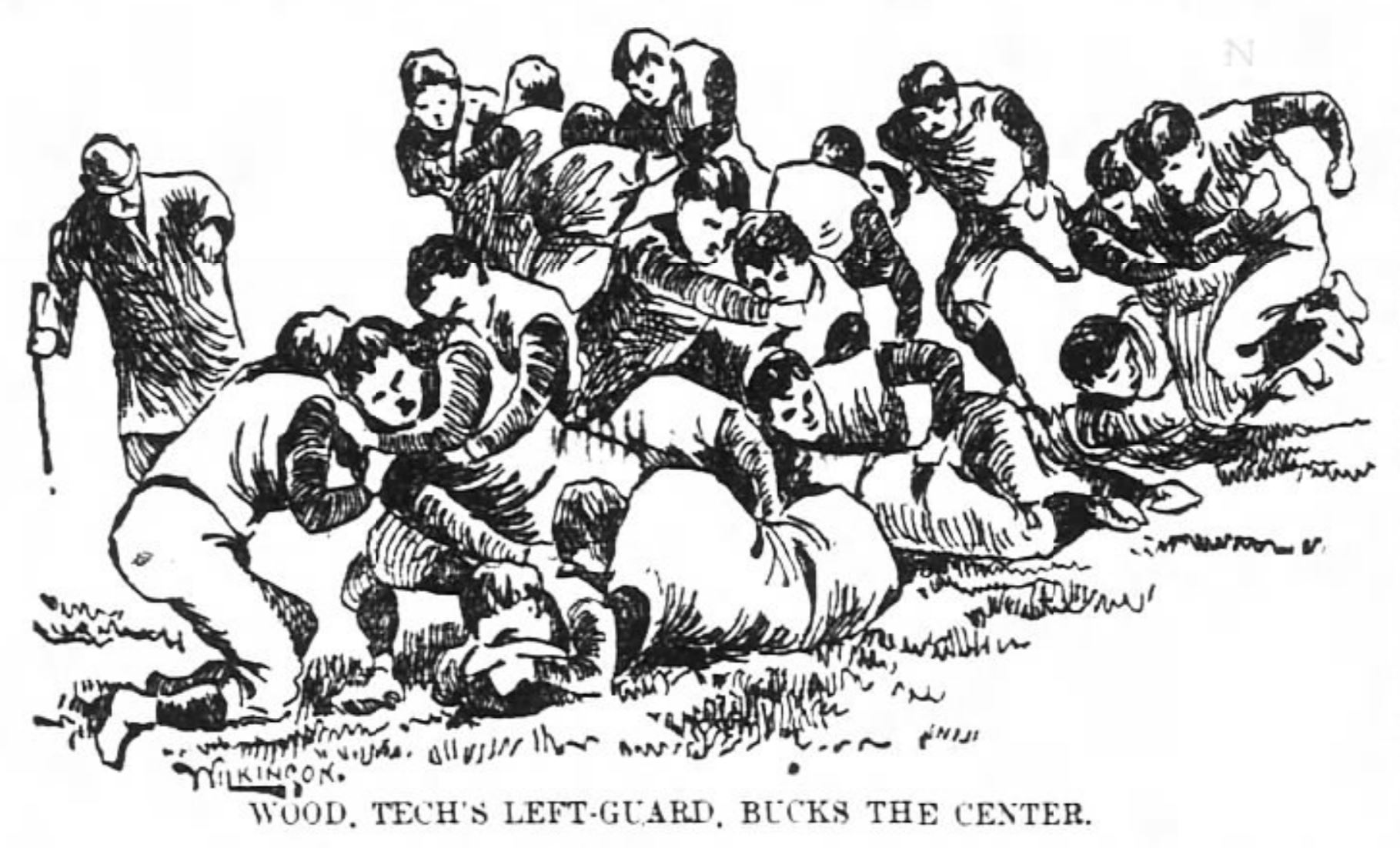
Tech's Wood rushes up the center against Saint Albans

The Techs' second opponent was against Saint Albans from Radford, Virginia, which entered the game 3-0-0 with wins against Virginia Military, Washington and Lee, and Emory and Henry.

In preparation for the game, Georgia Tech practiced an attack developed by Princeton. However, Tech fumbled the ball for a five-yard loss on its first possession, which set the tone for the remainder of the first half. Tech made little progress running around the ends and tried, instead, to concentrate on rushing up the middle. Neither team came within twenty yards of the opponent's goal and the score was 0–0 at halftime.

For the majority of the second half, things remained in a stalemate. The game was decided late in the second half when Saint Albans punted the ball on fourth down. Georgia Tech's Ed Whitney fumbled the ball upon being tackled, and the punter, Crawford Biggs, recovered the ball and ran it back for the game-winning touchdown. During Tech's ensuing drive, time was called with the ball on the Saint Albans' twenty-five yard line. Saint Albans won the game 6–0.

Following the game, the teams joined each other for a visit to the theater. It was later discovered that the Saint Albans' quarterback McGuire had broken his leg during the game but had continued to play to the finish. That night, he stayed at the Kimball House where a doctor was called. The next day, McGuire was transported via the train back to Virginia. The game was still being used to describe "a great crowd" the next summer.

Georgia Tech Techs (1–1–0) at Mercer Baptists (0–0–0)

Quarter	1	2	Total
Georgia Tech	10	0	10
Mercer	0	6	6

at Central City Park • Macon, Georgia

- Date: Saturday, December 16, 1893
- Game time: 3:00 p.m.
- Game attendance: 500

Mercer had defeated Georgia Tech in their first meeting the previous year. While Georgia Tech was not originally scheduled to play Mercer, the teams came to an agreement after Georgia backed out of a game with Mercer over a ticket payout dispute. Wood, Tech's coach and Army surgeon, was not available to make the trip.

The game took place at Central City Park in Macon, Georgia as Mercer was under a self-imposed moratorium from traveling outside of the city to play football. Georgia Tech fans and players arrived in Macon around 10:30 a.m., but rain threatened the game. By noon, the rain had subsided and about 500 fans came out to the afternoon kick-off. There were constant problems of fans encroaching the field of play throughout the game.

Georgia Tech opened the game in a wedge formation and concentrated rushing up the center, scoring a touchdown on its first drive. Mercer also used a wedge formation and moved the ball effectively on its ensuing drive but lost the ball on a fumble. Georgia Tech drove within fifteen yards of Mercer's goal where there it fumbled as well, but Georgia Tech was given the recovery and subsequently kicked a field goal to make it 10–0. The first half ended without any additional scoring.

For the first few drives of the second half, neither team was able to make much progress, though Mercer's push through the center finally advanced deep into Tech's territory towards the end of the game. Mercer's captain, George Stallings, scored on a ten-yard run on the last play of the game. Georgia Tech won 10–6 to finish the season with a record of 2–1–0.

== Players ==
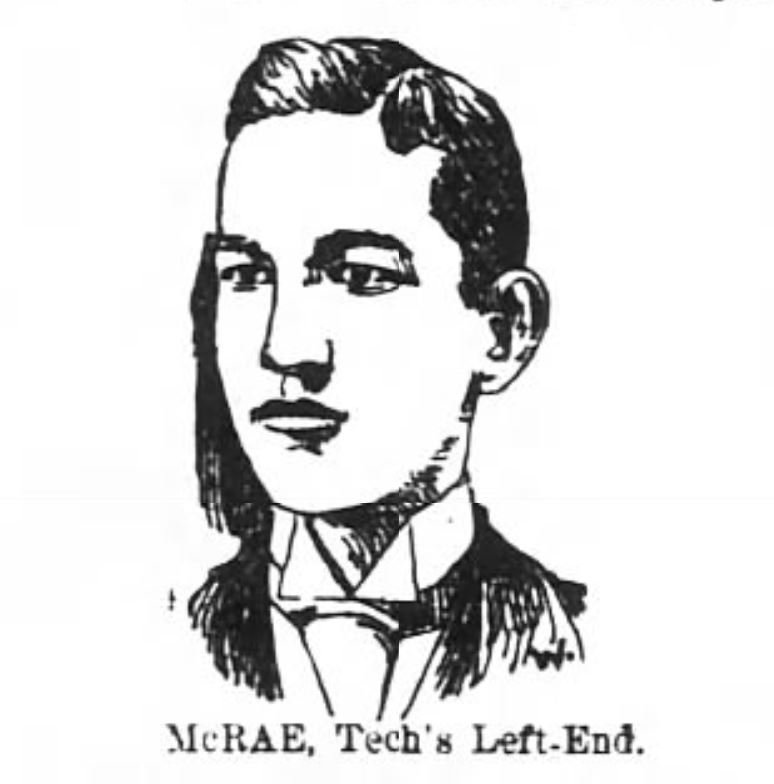
Murdock McRae (1870-1942)

Georgia Tech Techs 1893 game starters
	Georgia	Saint Albans	Mercer
Left end	Murdock McRae	Murdock McRae	Tom Raoul
Left tackle	Ed Werner	Ed Werner	Charles Haskell
Left guard	Leonard Wood	Leonard Wood	Grayson Heidt
Center	Frank Spain	Frank Spain	Frank Spain
Right guard	George Forest	George Forest	George Forest
Right tackle	Ernest Nourse	Ernest Nourse	Ernest Nourse
Right end	Charles Haskell	Charles Haskell	Murdock McRae
Quarterback	John Kimball	John Kimball	John Kimball
Left halfback	Ed Whitney	Ed Whitney	Ed Whitney
Right halfback	Will Hunter (C)	Will Hunter (C)	Will Hunter (C)
Fullback	Park Howell	Park Howell	Park Howell
Substitutes			
