= 1893 VAMC football team =

American college football season

1893 VAMC football
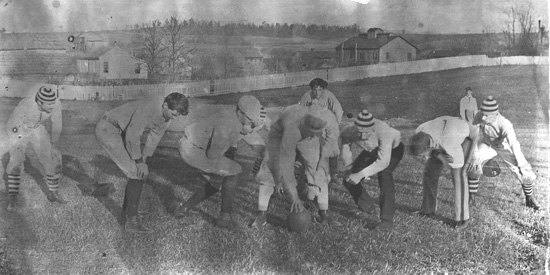
- Conference: Independent
- Record: 0–2
- Head coach: E. A. Smyth (2nd season)
- Captains: Solomon Vance Lovenstein; B. H. Wills

1893 Southern college football independents records
	Conf.			Overall
Team	W	L	T	W		L		T
Maryland		–		6	–	0	–	0
Texas		–		4	–	0	–	0
Central (KY)		–		2	–	0	–	0
Howard		–		2	–	0	–	0
North Carolina A&M		–		2	–	0	–	0
Vanderbilt		–		6	–	1	–	0
Auburn		–		3	–	0	–	2
Virginia		–		8	–	2	–	0
Ole Miss		–		4	–	1	–	0
Centre		–		4	–	1	–	0
Trinity (NC)		–		3	–	1	–	0
VMI		–		3	–	1	–	0
Kentucky State College		–		5	–	2	–	1
Delaware		–		2	–	1	–	0
Georgia Tech		–		2	–	1	–	0
Guilford		–		2	–	1	–	0
West Virginia		–		2	–	1	–	0
William & Mary		–		2	–	1	–	0
Navy		–		5	–	3	–	0
Richmond		–		3	–	2	–	0
Georgetown		–		4	–	4	–	0
Sewanee		–		3	–	3	–	0
Furman		–		1	–	1	–	0
Georgia		–		2	–	2	–	1
Western Maryland		–		1	–	1	–	0
Johns Hopkins		–		2	–	3	–	2
North Carolina		–		3	–	4	–	0
Tennessee		–		2	–	4	–	0
Tulane		–		1	–	2	–	0
Wake Forest		–		1	–	2	–	0
Hampden–Sydney		–		0	–	1	–	0
LSU		–		0	–	1	–	0
Maryville (TN)		–		0	–	1	–	0
Mercer		–		0	–	1	–	0
Wofford		–		0	–	1	–	0
VAMC		–		0	–	2	–	0
Alabama		–		0	–	4	–	0

The 1893 VAMC football team represented Virginia Agricultural and Mechanical College in the 1893 college football season. The team was led by their head coach E. A. Smyth and finished with a record of zero wins and two losses (0–2).

== Schedule ==
Date	Time	Opponent	Site	Result	Source
October 21	3:00 p.m.	at Emory and Henry	Emory, VA	L 0–6	
November 18		vs. Randolph-Macon Academy	Bedford, VA	L 6–34	

== Game summaries ==
=== Emory and Henry ===
VPI at Emory and Henry

Team	1	2	Total
VPI	0	0	0
• E&H	6	0	6

- Date: October 21, 1893
- Location: Emory, Virginia
- Game start: 3:00 p.m.
- Referee: L. H. Carlock (E&H)

On October 21, 1893, VAMC played football against Emory and Henry College in Emory, Virginia. VAMC lost 0–6 due to captain H. B. Wills "making a mistake of trying for a sensational field goal when we were gaining ten and twenty yards at every down and were within a few yards of the goal."

The starting lineup for VAMC was: Porcher (left end), Johnson (left tackle), Stull (left guard), Sayers (center), Patrick (right guard), Wayland (right tackle), Dashiell (right end), Fraser (quarterback), Guignard (left halfback), Slaughter (right halfback), Wills (fullback).

The starting lineup for Emory and Henry was: John Taylor (left end), Sanders Chiddix (left tackle), Wiley (left guard), Albert Buchanan (center), Peery (right guard), Sidney Vaught (right tackle), Fred Johnson (right end), Wiley (quarterback), Collins (left halfback), Frazier (right halfback), George McNeil (fullback).

=== Randolph–Macon Academy ===
The second and final game of the season was against Randolph-Macon Academy in Bedford, Virginia on November 18, 1893. VAMC lost 6–34. However, two newspaper articles from the time list the score as 6–38, and 6–35.

The starting lineup for VAMC was: Porcher (left end), Wayland (left tackle), Stull (left guard), Sayers (center), Patrick (right guard), Kerfoot (right tackle), Dashiell (right end), Robinson (quarterback), Harvey (left halfback), Friend (right halfback), Martin (fullback).

The starting lineup for Randolph–Macon Academy was: Thomas (left end), Griffin (left tackle), Ramsey (left guard), Hurtt (center), Brown (right guard), Jones (right tackle), Allen (right end), Nettles (quarterback), Hunt (left halfback), Ragland (right halfback), Doll (fullback).

== Players ==
The following players were members of the 1893 football team according to the roster published in the 1903 edition of The Bugle, the Virginia Tech yearbook. The roster is also found in the Virginia Tech University Archives.

VAMC 1893 roster
Quarterbacks: Samuel Sidney "Sid" Fraser; John William Robinson; Guards: Nerbon Robert Patrick; John Walter Stull; Tackles: M. C. Bond; Howard Archer Johnson; Edward Judson Kerfoot; R. E. Wayland	Ends: Thomas Edward Dashiell; Christopher Gadsden Porcher; Halfbacks: Charles Thomas Friend; Christopher Gadsden Guignard; Urban Harvey; Robert Kyle Slaughter; Fullback: Tarpley Douglas Martin	Substitutes: Solomon Vance Lovenstein (Capt.); Henry Davis Sayers; B. H. Wills (Capt.)
