= 1893 Georgia Bulldogs football team =

American college football season

1893 Georgia Bulldogs football
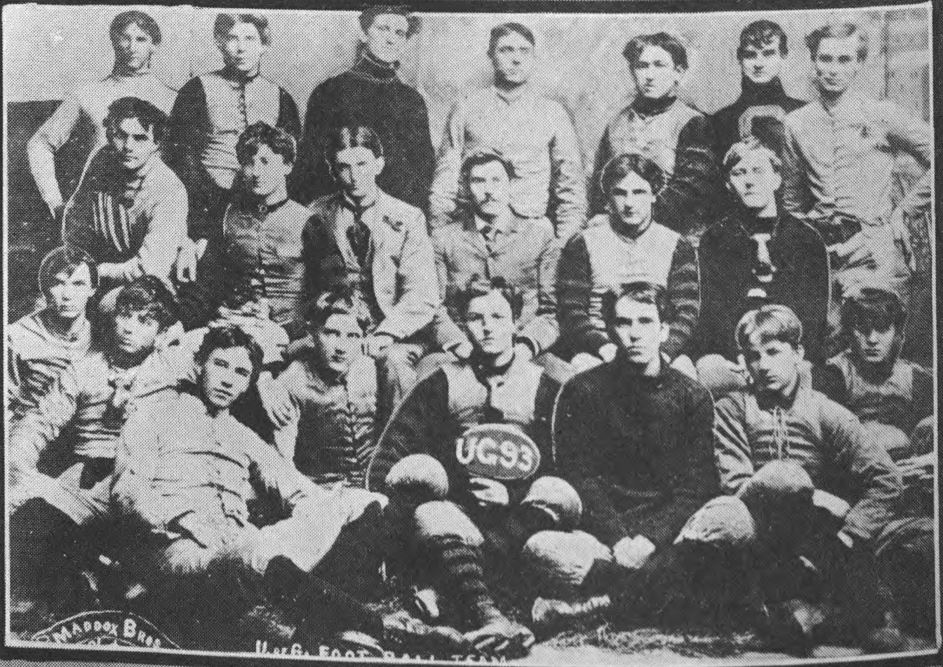
- Conference: Independent
- Record: 2–2–1
- Head coach: Ernest Brown (1st season)
- Captain: George Butler
- Home stadium: Herty Field

1893 Southern college football independents records
	Conf.			Overall
Team	W	L	T	W		L		T
Maryland		–		6	–	0	–	0
Texas		–		4	–	0	–	0
Central (KY)		–		2	–	0	–	0
Howard		–		2	–	0	–	0
North Carolina A&M		–		2	–	0	–	0
Vanderbilt		–		6	–	1	–	0
Auburn		–		3	–	0	–	2
Virginia		–		8	–	2	–	0
Ole Miss		–		4	–	1	–	0
Centre		–		4	–	1	–	0
Trinity (NC)		–		3	–	1	–	0
VMI		–		3	–	1	–	0
Kentucky State College		–		5	–	2	–	1
Delaware		–		2	–	1	–	0
Georgia Tech		–		2	–	1	–	0
Guilford		–		2	–	1	–	0
West Virginia		–		2	–	1	–	0
William & Mary		–		2	–	1	–	0
Navy		–		5	–	3	–	0
Richmond		–		3	–	2	–	0
Georgetown		–		4	–	4	–	0
Sewanee		–		3	–	3	–	0
Furman		–		1	–	1	–	0
Georgia		–		2	–	2	–	1
Western Maryland		–		1	–	1	–	0
Johns Hopkins		–		2	–	3	–	2
North Carolina		–		3	–	4	–	0
Tennessee		–		2	–	4	–	0
Tulane		–		1	–	2	–	0
Wake Forest		–		1	–	2	–	0
Hampden–Sydney		–		0	–	1	–	0
LSU		–		0	–	1	–	0
Maryville (TN)		–		0	–	1	–	0
Mercer		–		0	–	1	–	0
Wofford		–		0	–	1	–	0
VAMC		–		0	–	2	–	0
Alabama		–		0	–	4	–	0

The 1893 Georgia Bulldogs football team represented the University of Georgia during the 1893 college football season. The Bulldogs completed the season with a 2–2–1 record. 1893 saw the Bulldogs play their first games against Georgia Tech, losing 28–6, Vanderbilt, losing 10–35, and Furman, winning 22–8. The rivalries with Georgia Tech and Vanderbilt continue to the present day, while the last game played against Furman was played in 1950. Today, the game with Georgia Tech is today known as "Clean, Old-Fashioned Hate."

One of the notable players on the team for the 1893 season was Blanton Winship, a law student at Georgia. Winship played tackle that year only, but went on to become a military lawyer, a veteran of both the Spanish–American War and World War I, the Judge Advocate General of the United States Army and the Governor of Puerto Rico.

== Schedule ==
Date	Opponent	Site	Result	Source
November 4	Georgia Tech	Herty Field; Athens, GA (rivalry)	L 6–28	
November 12	at Vanderbilt	Dudley Field; Nashville, TN (rivalry)	L 0–35	
November 30	at Savannah Athletic Association	Bolton Street Park; Savannah, GA	T 0–0	
December 1	at Augusta Athletic Association	Exposition Grounds; Augusta, GA	W 24–0	
December 9	vs. Furman	Exposition Grounds; Augusta, GA	W 22–8	

== Sources ==
- Reed, Thomas Walter (c. 1949). "Athletics at the University from the Beginning Through 1947". History of the University of Georgia. dlg.galileo.usg.edu. pp. 3432–3438.
- "Georgia Football History: Former Head Coaches". georgiadogs.com. Archived from the original on December 31, 2010.
