= 1893 William & Mary Orange and White football team =

American college football season

1893 William & Mary football
- Conference: Independent
- Record: 2–1
- Head coach: None
- Captain: H. G. Humphreys

1893 Southern college football independents records
	Conf.			Overall
Team	W	L	T	W		L		T
Maryland		–		6	–	0	–	0
Texas		–		4	–	0	–	0
Central (KY)		–		2	–	0	–	0
Howard		–		2	–	0	–	0
North Carolina A&M		–		2	–	0	–	0
Vanderbilt		–		6	–	1	–	0
Auburn		–		3	–	0	–	2
Virginia		–		8	–	2	–	0
Ole Miss		–		4	–	1	–	0
Centre		–		4	–	1	–	0
Trinity (NC)		–		3	–	1	–	0
VMI		–		3	–	1	–	0
Kentucky State College		–		5	–	2	–	1
Delaware		–		2	–	1	–	0
Georgia Tech		–		2	–	1	–	0
Guilford		–		2	–	1	–	0
West Virginia		–		2	–	1	–	0
William & Mary		–		2	–	1	–	0
Navy		–		5	–	3	–	0
Richmond		–		3	–	2	–	0
Georgetown		–		4	–	4	–	0
Sewanee		–		3	–	3	–	0
Furman		–		1	–	1	–	0
Georgia		–		2	–	2	–	1
Western Maryland		–		1	–	1	–	0
Johns Hopkins		–		2	–	3	–	2
North Carolina		–		3	–	4	–	0
Tennessee		–		2	–	4	–	0
Tulane		–		1	–	2	–	0
Wake Forest		–		1	–	2	–	0
Hampden–Sydney		–		0	–	1	–	0
LSU		–		0	–	1	–	0
Maryville (TN)		–		0	–	1	–	0
Mercer		–		0	–	1	–	0
Wofford		–		0	–	1	–	0
VAMC		–		0	–	2	–	0
Alabama		–		0	–	4	–	0

The 1893 William & Mary football team represented the College of William & Mary during the 1893 college football season. In the fall of 1893, Charles L. Hepburn brought together the first official football team at William & Mary—the college's first organized athletic team. The 1893 team played three games, starting with the first contest in school history against a YMCA team from nearby Norfolk, Virginia.

== Schedule ==
Date	Opponent	Site	Result	Attendance	Source
November 11	at Norfolk YMCA	YMCA Park; Norfolk, VA	L 4–10	250	
November 18	Old Dominion Athletic Club	Norfolk, VA	W 14–4		
November 30	vs. Capital City Athletic Club	Richmond, VA	W 8–4		
