= 1893 Delaware football team =

American college football season

1893 Delaware football
- Conference: Independent
- Record: 2–1
- Head coach: None

1893 Southern college football independents records
| | Conf. | | | Overall |
| Team | W | L | T | W | | L | | T |
|---|---|---|---|---|---|---|---|---|
| Maryland | | – | | 6 | – | 0 | – | 0 |
| Texas | | – | | 4 | – | 0 | – | 0 |
| Central (KY) | | – | | 2 | – | 0 | – | 0 |
| Howard | | – | | 2 | – | 0 | – | 0 |
| North Carolina A&M | | – | | 2 | – | 0 | – | 0 |
| Vanderbilt | | – | | 6 | – | 1 | – | 0 |
| Auburn | | – | | 3 | – | 0 | – | 2 |
| Virginia | | – | | 8 | – | 2 | – | 0 |
| Ole Miss | | – | | 4 | – | 1 | – | 0 |
| Centre | | – | | 4 | – | 1 | – | 0 |
| Trinity (NC) | | – | | 3 | – | 1 | – | 0 |
| VMI | | – | | 3 | – | 1 | – | 0 |
| Kentucky State College | | – | | 5 | – | 2 | – | 1 |
| Delaware | | – | | 2 | – | 1 | – | 0 |
| Georgia Tech | | – | | 2 | – | 1 | – | 0 |
| Guilford | | – | | 2 | – | 1 | – | 0 |
| West Virginia | | – | | 2 | – | 1 | – | 0 |
| William & Mary | | – | | 2 | – | 1 | – | 0 |
| Navy | | – | | 5 | – | 3 | – | 0 |
| Richmond | | – | | 3 | – | 2 | – | 0 |
| Georgetown | | – | | 4 | – | 4 | – | 0 |
| Sewanee | | – | | 3 | – | 3 | – | 0 |
| Furman | | – | | 1 | – | 1 | – | 0 |
| Georgia | | – | | 2 | – | 2 | – | 1 |
| Western Maryland | | – | | 1 | – | 1 | – | 0 |
| Johns Hopkins | | – | | 2 | – | 3 | – | 2 |
| North Carolina | | – | | 3 | – | 4 | – | 0 |
| Tennessee | | – | | 2 | – | 4 | – | 0 |
| Tulane | | – | | 1 | – | 2 | – | 0 |
| Wake Forest | | – | | 1 | – | 2 | – | 0 |
| Hampden–Sydney | | – | | 0 | – | 1 | – | 0 |
| LSU | | – | | 0 | – | 1 | – | 0 |
| Maryville (TN) | | – | | 0 | – | 1 | – | 0 |
| Mercer | | – | | 0 | – | 1 | – | 0 |
| Wofford | | – | | 0 | – | 1 | – | 0 |
| VAMC | | – | | 0 | – | 2 | – | 0 |
| Alabama | | – | | 0 | – | 4 | – | 0 |

The 1893 Delaware football team represented Delaware College—now known as the University of Delaware—as an independent during the 1893 college football season.

== Schedule ==
| Date | Opponent | Site | Result | Source |
|---|---|---|---|---|
| October 23 | at Warren Athletic Club of Wilmington | Wilmington, DE | L 0–2 | |
| November 11 | at Philadelphia Manual Training School | Philadelphia, PA | W 44–0 | |
| November 18 | at Dover Conference Academy Athletic Club | Dover, DE | W 58–0 | |
