= 1893 Navy Midshipmen football team =

American college football season

1893 Navy Midshipmen football
- Conference: Independent
- Record: 5–3
- Head coach: John A. Hartwell (1st season)
- Captain: Art Kavanagh
- Home stadium: Worden Field

1893 Southern college football independents records
	Conf.			Overall
Team	W	L	T	W		L		T
Maryland		–		6	–	0	–	0
Texas		–		4	–	0	–	0
Central (KY)		–		2	–	0	–	0
Howard		–		2	–	0	–	0
North Carolina A&M		–		2	–	0	–	0
Vanderbilt		–		6	–	1	–	0
Auburn		–		3	–	0	–	2
Virginia		–		8	–	2	–	0
Ole Miss		–		4	–	1	–	0
Centre		–		4	–	1	–	0
Trinity (NC)		–		3	–	1	–	0
VMI		–		3	–	1	–	0
Kentucky State College		–		5	–	2	–	1
Delaware		–		2	–	1	–	0
Georgia Tech		–		2	–	1	–	0
Guilford		–		2	–	1	–	0
West Virginia		–		2	–	1	–	0
William & Mary		–		2	–	1	–	0
Navy		–		5	–	3	–	0
Richmond		–		3	–	2	–	0
Georgetown		–		4	–	4	–	0
Sewanee		–		3	–	3	–	0
Furman		–		1	–	1	–	0
Georgia		–		2	–	2	–	1
Western Maryland		–		1	–	1	–	0
Johns Hopkins		–		2	–	3	–	2
North Carolina		–		3	–	4	–	0
Tennessee		–		2	–	4	–	0
Tulane		–		1	–	2	–	0
Wake Forest		–		1	–	2	–	0
Hampden–Sydney		–		0	–	1	–	0
LSU		–		0	–	1	–	0
Maryville (TN)		–		0	–	1	–	0
Mercer		–		0	–	1	–	0
Wofford		–		0	–	1	–	0
VAMC		–		0	–	2	–	0
Alabama		–		0	–	4	–	0

The 1893 Navy Midshipmen football team represented the United States Naval Academy during the 1893 college football season. In their first and only season under head coach John A. Hartwell, the Midshipmen compiled a 5–3 record, shut out two opponents, and outscored all opponents by a combined score of 122 to 78.

== Schedule ==
Date	Opponent	Site	Result	Source
October 11	Penn	Worden Field; Annapolis, MD	L 0–34	
October 14	Dickinson	Worden Field; Annapolis, MD	W 26–0	
October 21	Virginia	Worden Field; Annapolis, MD	W 28–0	
October 28	Lehigh	Worden Field; Annapolis, MD	L 6–12	
November 4	Georgetown	Worden Field; Annapolis, MD	W 22–10	
November 18	Franklin & Marshall	Worden Field; Annapolis, MD	W 34–6	
November 22	Virginia	Worden Field; Annapolis, MD	L 0–12	
December 2	Army	Worden Field; Annapolis, MD (Army–Navy Game)	W 6–4	
