= 1893 Alabama Crimson White football team =

American college football season

1893 Alabama Crimson White football
- Conference: Independent
- Record: 0–4
- Head coach: Eli Abbott (1st season)
- Captain: C. C. Nesmith
- Home stadium: Lakeview Park; The Quad

1893 Southern college football independents records
	Conf.			Overall
Team	W	L	T	W		L		T
Maryland		–		6	–	0	–	0
Texas		–		4	–	0	–	0
Central (KY)		–		2	–	0	–	0
Howard		–		2	–	0	–	0
North Carolina A&M		–		2	–	0	–	0
Vanderbilt		–		6	–	1	–	0
Auburn		–		3	–	0	–	2
Virginia		–		8	–	2	–	0
Ole Miss		–		4	–	1	–	0
Centre		–		4	–	1	–	0
Trinity (NC)		–		3	–	1	–	0
VMI		–		3	–	1	–	0
Kentucky State College		–		5	–	2	–	1
Delaware		–		2	–	1	–	0
Georgia Tech		–		2	–	1	–	0
Guilford		–		2	–	1	–	0
West Virginia		–		2	–	1	–	0
William & Mary		–		2	–	1	–	0
Navy		–		5	–	3	–	0
Richmond		–		3	–	2	–	0
Georgetown		–		4	–	4	–	0
Sewanee		–		3	–	3	–	0
Furman		–		1	–	1	–	0
Georgia		–		2	–	2	–	1
Western Maryland		–		1	–	1	–	0
Johns Hopkins		–		2	–	3	–	2
North Carolina		–		3	–	4	–	0
Tennessee		–		2	–	4	–	0
Tulane		–		1	–	2	–	0
Wake Forest		–		1	–	2	–	0
Hampden–Sydney		–		0	–	1	–	0
LSU		–		0	–	1	–	0
Maryville (TN)		–		0	–	1	–	0
Mercer		–		0	–	1	–	0
Wofford		–		0	–	1	–	0
VAMC		–		0	–	2	–	0
Alabama		–		0	–	4	–	0

The 1893 Alabama Crimson White football team represented the University of Alabama in the 1893 college football season. The team was led by head coach Eli Abbott and played their home games at Lakeview Park in Birmingham and The Quad in Tuscaloosa, Alabama. In what was the second season of Alabama football, the team finished with a record of zero wins and four losses (0–4).

Although they finished their inaugural year with a .500 record, head coach E. B. Beaumont was fired and replaced with Abbott prior to the start of the season. The 1893 squad opened the season with a pair of losses against the Birmingham Athletic Club, first in Tuscaloosa and then again a month later at Birmingham. The Crimson White was then shutout by Sewanee in their first game against an out-of-state opponent, and then closed the season with a 40–16 loss in the Iron Bowl against Auburn at Montgomery. The winless season was the first of only three in the history of the Alabama program.

== Schedule ==
Date	Opponent	Site	Result
October 13	Birmingham Athletic Club	The Quad; Tuscaloosa, AL	L 0–4
November 4	Birmingham Athletic Club	Lakeview Park; Birmingham, AL	L 8–10
November 11	Sewanee	Lakeview Park; Birmingham, AL	L 0–20
November 30	vs. Auburn	Riverside Park; Montgomery, AL (rivalry)	L 16–40

(Note: For the 1893 season, point values were different from those used in contemporary games. In 1893 a touchdown was worth four points, a field goal was worth five points and an extra point was worth two points.)

== Background ==
In their inaugural season, Alabama was led by head coach E. B. Beaumont to an overall record of two wins and two losses (2–2). During the season, they defeated Birmingham High School, split a pair against the Birmingham Athletic Club and lost to Auburn in their final game of the season. (Note: Although played on February 22, 1893, Alabama considers their first all-time game against Auburn as the final game of the 1892 season. On the contrary, Auburn considers the game as their first of their 1893 season.) After the completion of the season, Beaumont was fired as head coach and replaced with former player Eli Abbott for the 1893 campaign. The team was called the "Crimson White" from 1893 to 1906, when their name changed to the currently used "Crimson Tide."

== Game summaries ==
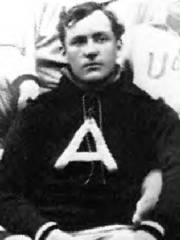
Eli Abbott was Alabama's head coach for the 1893 season.

=== Birmingham Athletic Club (October) ===
In the first ever game played in Tuscaloosa, the Birmingham Athletic Club (B.A.C.) defeated Alabama 4–0 at The Quad on the campus of the University of Alabama. In a game controlled by both defenses, the only points came on an Athletics touchdown in the second half. With the loss, this and later the 1895 and 1955 squads represented the only seasons Alabama failed to win a game at Tuscaloosa during a season that at least one game was played there.

=== Birmingham Athletic Club (November) ===
In a rematch against the B.A.C. a month later at Lakeview Park in Birmingham, Alabama lost their second game of the season by a final score of 10–8. After they trailed 4–0 at the end of the first half, Alabama scored their first points of the season on a William Walker touchdown run early in the second half and tied the game 4–4. The Athletics retook a 10–4 lead when they scored a touchdown and converted the extra point, but then Walker scored his second touchdown of the game that made the final score 10–8 after a missed extra point. The second loss against the B.A.C. marked the only time in Alabama football history the same team defeated the Crimson Tide twice in the same season.

=== Sewanee ===
Against their first-ever opponent from outside the state of Alabama, Sewanee shut out the Crimson White 20–0 at Lakeview Park. The Tigers took a 4–0 lead in the 22nd minute of the first half when Wilson scored on a short touchdown run. Early in the second half, Sewanee extended their lead to 8–0 when Norman scored on a 25-yard touchdown run behind the flying wedge formation. Nelson then scored the final two Tiger touchdowns on runs of 45 and one-yard for the 20–0 victory. Sewanee later became one of Alabama's biggest rivals in the early decades of the football program.

=== Auburn ===
After playing their previous game at Birmingham's Lakeview Park, the city of Montgomery gave Alabama and the Agricultural & Mechanical College of Alabama (now known as Auburn University) $500 to play each other at Riverside Park. In the second edition of what has since become known as the Iron Bowl, Auburn won 40–16. Auburn scored first when Rufus Dorsey scored on a 10-yard touchdown run and kicked the extra point for a 6–0 lead. Alabama responded on their next possession when John Burgett scored on a 35-yard touchdown run. However G. H. Kyser missed the extra point and Auburn still held a 6–4 lead. Auburn then extended their lead to 18–4 at halftime after a pair of touchdown from J. C. Dunham.

Alabama opened the second half with their second touchdown of the game. William Walker scored on a six-yard touchdown run and cut the Tigers' lead to 18–10. Auburn responded with touchdown runs by Snow Perkins, Arthur Redding and J. V. Brown that made the score 34–10. After a David Grayson touchdown for Alabama, Auburn responded with their final points of the game on a one-yard Dorsey run that made the final score 40–16. Governor of Alabama Thomas G. Jones presented a trophy to Auburn's captain Rufus Dorsey for their victory.

== Players ==
The following players were members of the 1893 football team according to the roster published in the 1894 edition of The Corolla, the University of Alabama yearbook.

Alabama Crimson White 1893 roster
Guards: R. E. Boyle; Marion Letcher; Merrill Northington; Tackles: John Burgett; L. W. Simpson; Ends: G. H. Kyser; Samuel Slone	Halfbacks: David Grayson; Hugh Morrow; C. C. Nesmith; S. H. Strickland; Quarterback: William Walker	Substitutes: H. M. Bankhead; John Dewberry; C. S. Goodwin; D. B. Johnson; G. Parker; D. H. Smith; M. P. Walker

== Aftermath ==
With their loss to Auburn, Alabama completed the first winless season in Alabama football history, and since then they have had only two other winless seasons in 1895 and 1955. The losses of 1893 were attributed to the small stature of the Crimson players and not to the coaching and training of the team. As such, Abbott returned as head coach for the 1894 season and led Alabama to a winning season that included their first all-time win over Auburn.

== See also ==
- List of the first college football game in each US state
