= 1893 Wofford Terriers football team =

American college football season

1893 Wofford Terriers football
- Conference: Independent
- Record: 0–1
- Head coach: None

1893 Southern college football independents records
	Conf.			Overall
Team	W	L	T	W		L		T
Maryland		–		6	–	0	–	0
Texas		–		4	–	0	–	0
Central (KY)		–		2	–	0	–	0
Howard		–		2	–	0	–	0
North Carolina A&M		–		2	–	0	–	0
Vanderbilt		–		6	–	1	–	0
Auburn		–		3	–	0	–	2
Virginia		–		8	–	2	–	0
Ole Miss		–		4	–	1	–	0
Centre		–		4	–	1	–	0
Trinity (NC)		–		3	–	1	–	0
VMI		–		3	–	1	–	0
Kentucky State College		–		5	–	2	–	1
Delaware		–		2	–	1	–	0
Georgia Tech		–		2	–	1	–	0
Guilford		–		2	–	1	–	0
West Virginia		–		2	–	1	–	0
William & Mary		–		2	–	1	–	0
Navy		–		5	–	3	–	0
Richmond		–		3	–	2	–	0
Georgetown		–		4	–	4	–	0
Sewanee		–		3	–	3	–	0
Furman		–		1	–	1	–	0
Georgia		–		2	–	2	–	1
Western Maryland		–		1	–	1	–	0
Johns Hopkins		–		2	–	3	–	2
North Carolina		–		3	–	4	–	0
Tennessee		–		2	–	4	–	0
Tulane		–		1	–	2	–	0
Wake Forest		–		1	–	2	–	0
Hampden–Sydney		–		0	–	1	–	0
LSU		–		0	–	1	–	0
Maryville (TN)		–		0	–	1	–	0
Mercer		–		0	–	1	–	0
Wofford		–		0	–	1	–	0
VAMC		–		0	–	2	–	0
Alabama		–		0	–	4	–	0

The 1893 Wofford Terriers football team represented Wofford College as an independent in the 1893 college football season. The team compiled an 0–1 record, losing its only game to Furman on November 30 by an 18–4 score. The game was played at Greenville, South Carolina.

== Schedule ==
Date	Opponent	Site	Result	Source
November 30	at Furman	Greenville, SC	L 4–18	
