= 1893 LSU football team =

American college football season

1893 LSU football
- Conference: Independent
- Record: 0–1
- Head coach: Charles E. Coates (1st season)
- Captain: Ruffin G. Pleasant
- Home stadium: State Field

1893 Southern college football independents records
	Conf.			Overall
Team	W	L	T	W		L		T
Maryland		–		6	–	0	–	0
Texas		–		4	–	0	–	0
Central (KY)		–		2	–	0	–	0
Howard		–		2	–	0	–	0
North Carolina A&M		–		2	–	0	–	0
Vanderbilt		–		6	–	1	–	0
Auburn		–		3	–	0	–	2
Virginia		–		8	–	2	–	0
Ole Miss		–		4	–	1	–	0
Centre		–		4	–	1	–	0
Trinity (NC)		–		3	–	1	–	0
VMI		–		3	–	1	–	0
Kentucky State College		–		5	–	2	–	1
Delaware		–		2	–	1	–	0
Georgia Tech		–		2	–	1	–	0
Guilford		–		2	–	1	–	0
West Virginia		–		2	–	1	–	0
William & Mary		–		2	–	1	–	0
Navy		–		5	–	3	–	0
Richmond		–		3	–	2	–	0
Georgetown		–		4	–	4	–	0
Sewanee		–		3	–	3	–	0
Furman		–		1	–	1	–	0
Georgia		–		2	–	2	–	1
Western Maryland		–		1	–	1	–	0
Johns Hopkins		–		2	–	3	–	2
North Carolina		–		3	–	4	–	0
Tennessee		–		2	–	4	–	0
Tulane		–		1	–	2	–	0
Wake Forest		–		1	–	2	–	0
Hampden–Sydney		–		0	–	1	–	0
LSU		–		0	–	1	–	0
Maryville (TN)		–		0	–	1	–	0
Mercer		–		0	–	1	–	0
Wofford		–		0	–	1	–	0
VAMC		–		0	–	2	–	0
Alabama		–		0	–	4	–	0

The 1893 LSU football team represented Louisiana State University (LSU) during the 1893 college football season. This was the first year that LSU sponsored a football team. The Tigers were coached by university professor Dr Charles E. Coates against in-state school Tulane of New Orleans. The game sparked a rivalry between the Tigers and the Green Wave that has lasted generations. Future Louisiana governor Ruffin G. Pleasant was the quarterback and captain of the LSU team. In the first game against Tulane, LSU football players wore purple and gold ribbons on their uniforms. According to legend, purple and gold were chosen because they were Mardi Gras colors, and the green of Mardi Gras was sold out. An LSU baseball team had also worn purple and gold in its first varsity game against Tulane earlier in 1893, even though LSU's official colors at the time were actually blue and white.

The rules of play in 1893 were more like rugby than what might be considered modern football. The rules called for eleven players on a side with a scrimmage line dividing the teams. The team on offense was required to begin a play by kicking the ball either forward or backward to the quarterback. The quarterback couldn't run with the ball, but he could hand it off. In order to keep possession, the offensive team had to either gain five yards in three downs or not lose ten yards. Forward passing was not allowed. Touchdowns counted for 4 points, with 2 points for a goal after a touchdown, 4 points for a field goal, and 2 points for a safety. Players wore an assortment of "football armor" such as "shin guards, rubber noses, head bands, ankle protectors, elbow and hip pads, ear guards, and mouth pieces. The game consisted of two 45-minute halves.

== Schedule ==
Date	Opponent	Site	Result	Attendance	Source
November 25	at Tulane	Sportsman's Park; New Orleans, LA (Battle for the Rag)	L 0–34	2,000	

== Roster ==
No.	Player	Position	Height	Weight	Hometown	High School
-	Charles P. Andrews	-	-	-	Mer Rouge, LA	-
-	William C. Bates	Right end	-	-	Baton Rouge, LA	-
-	James Beard	Center	-	-	Lake Providence, LA	-
-	Wilfred Boudreaux	Guard, tackle	-	-	Sunset, LA	-
-	Alexis "Alex" Brian	Left tackle	-	-	Montgomery, LA	-
-	Ralph A. Broussard	Halfback	-	-	Abbeville, LA	-
-	Samuel P. Brown	Guard, tackle	-	-	Carencro, LA	-
-	Ferdinand Joseph Cambon	Guard, tackle	-	-	Dulac, LA	-
-	Eugene Preston Campbell	End	-	-	Vidalia, LA	-
-	Samuel Marmaduke Dinwidie Clark	Left end	-	-	DeValls, LA	-
-	Gordon A. Dennis	-	-	-	Shreveport, LA	-
-	Sam G. Dupree	Guard	-	-	Baton Rouge, LA	-
-	Edwin Franklin Gayle	Halfback	-	155	Legonier, LA	-
-	James M. Huey	-	-	-	Ruston, LA	-
-	Frederick G. Lyons	Quarterback	-	-	New Orleans, LA	-
-	Ruffin G. Pleasant	Quarterback	-	-	Farmerville, LA	-
-	Joel M. Pratt	End	-	-	Baton Rouge, LA	-
-	Aaron Prescott	-	-	-	Washington, LA	-
-	Willis B. Prescott	Fullback	-	-	Washington, LA	-
-	James A. Roane	-	-	-	Vienna, LA	-
-	George C. Schoenberger	End	-	-	Buras, LA	-
-	Edward Eugene Scott	Center	-	-	Kingston, LA	-
-	William Crosby Smedes	Center	-	-	Vicksburg, MS	-
-	Charles H. Tisdale	Halfback	-	-	New Orleans, LA	-
-	Walter S. Trichel	Fullback	-	-	Natchitoches, LA	-
-	Charles G. Young	Guard, tackle	-	-	Homer, LA	-

Roster from Fanbase.com and LSU: The Louisiana Tigers

== See also ==
- List of the first college football game in each US state
