= 1893 Tulane Olive and Blue football team =

American college football season

1893 Tulane Olive and Blue football
- Conference: Independent
- Record: 1–2
- Head coach: T. L. Bayne (1st season)
- Captain: John Lombard
- Home stadium: Sportsman's Park

1893 Southern college football independents records
	Conf.			Overall
Team	W	L	T	W		L		T
Maryland		–		6	–	0	–	0
Texas		–		4	–	0	–	0
Central (KY)		–		2	–	0	–	0
Howard		–		2	–	0	–	0
North Carolina A&M		–		2	–	0	–	0
Vanderbilt		–		6	–	1	–	0
Auburn		–		3	–	0	–	2
Virginia		–		8	–	2	–	0
Ole Miss		–		4	–	1	–	0
Centre		–		4	–	1	–	0
Trinity (NC)		–		3	–	1	–	0
VMI		–		3	–	1	–	0
Kentucky State College		–		5	–	2	–	1
Delaware		–		2	–	1	–	0
Georgia Tech		–		2	–	1	–	0
Guilford		–		2	–	1	–	0
West Virginia		–		2	–	1	–	0
William & Mary		–		2	–	1	–	0
Navy		–		5	–	3	–	0
Richmond		–		3	–	2	–	0
Georgetown		–		4	–	4	–	0
Sewanee		–		3	–	3	–	0
Furman		–		1	–	1	–	0
Georgia		–		2	–	2	–	1
Western Maryland		–		1	–	1	–	0
Johns Hopkins		–		2	–	3	–	2
North Carolina		–		3	–	4	–	0
Tennessee		–		2	–	4	–	0
Tulane		–		1	–	2	–	0
Wake Forest		–		1	–	2	–	0
Hampden–Sydney		–		0	–	1	–	0
LSU		–		0	–	1	–	0
Maryville (TN)		–		0	–	1	–	0
Mercer		–		0	–	1	–	0
Wofford		–		0	–	1	–	0
VAMC		–		0	–	2	–	0
Alabama		–		0	–	4	–	0

The 1893 Tulane Olive and Blue football team represented Tulane University as an independent during the 1893 college football season and was the first team at Tulane to play intercollegiate games.

== Schedule ==
Date	Opponent	Site	Result	Attendance	Source
November 18	Southern Athletic Club	Sportsman's Park; New Orleans, LA	L 0–12		
November 25	LSU	Sportsman's Park; New Orleans, LA (rivalry)	W 34–0	2,000	
December 2	Ole Miss	Sportsman's Park; New Orleans, LA (rivalry)	L 4–12		
