= 1893 Trinity Blue and White football team =

American college football season

1893 Trinity Blue and White football
- Conference: Independent
- Record: 3–1
- Head coach: None
- Captain: Alphonso Avery Jr.

1893 Southern college football independents records
	Conf.			Overall
Team	W	L	T	W		L		T
Maryland		–		6	–	0	–	0
Texas		–		4	–	0	–	0
Central (KY)		–		2	–	0	–	0
Howard		–		2	–	0	–	0
North Carolina A&M		–		2	–	0	–	0
Vanderbilt		–		6	–	1	–	0
Auburn		–		3	–	0	–	2
Virginia		–		8	–	2	–	0
Ole Miss		–		4	–	1	–	0
Centre		–		4	–	1	–	0
Trinity (NC)		–		3	–	1	–	0
VMI		–		3	–	1	–	0
Kentucky State College		–		5	–	2	–	1
Delaware		–		2	–	1	–	0
Georgia Tech		–		2	–	1	–	0
Guilford		–		2	–	1	–	0
West Virginia		–		2	–	1	–	0
William & Mary		–		2	–	1	–	0
Navy		–		5	–	3	–	0
Richmond		–		3	–	2	–	0
Georgetown		–		4	–	4	–	0
Sewanee		–		3	–	3	–	0
Furman		–		1	–	1	–	0
Georgia		–		2	–	2	–	1
Western Maryland		–		1	–	1	–	0
Johns Hopkins		–		2	–	3	–	2
North Carolina		–		3	–	4	–	0
Tennessee		–		2	–	4	–	0
Tulane		–		1	–	2	–	0
Wake Forest		–		1	–	2	–	0
Hampden–Sydney		–		0	–	1	–	0
LSU		–		0	–	1	–	0
Maryville (TN)		–		0	–	1	–	0
Mercer		–		0	–	1	–	0
Wofford		–		0	–	1	–	0
VAMC		–		0	–	2	–	0
Alabama		–		0	–	4	–	0

The 1893 Trinity Blue and White football team was an American football team that represented Trinity College (later renamed Duke University) as an independent during the 1893 college football season. The team compiled a 3–1 record. The team had no coach; Alphonso Avery, Jr. was the team captain.

== Schedule ==
Date	Opponent	Site	Result	Source
October 18	vs. Wake Forest	State Fairgrounds; Raleigh, NC	W 12–6	
October 28	North Carolina	Durham, NC (rivalry)	W 6–4	
November 4	Tennessee	Durham, NC	W 70–0	
November 11	vs. Virginia	Lynchburg, VA	L 0–30	
