= 1893 Vanderbilt Commodores football team =

American college football season

1893 Vanderbilt Commodores football
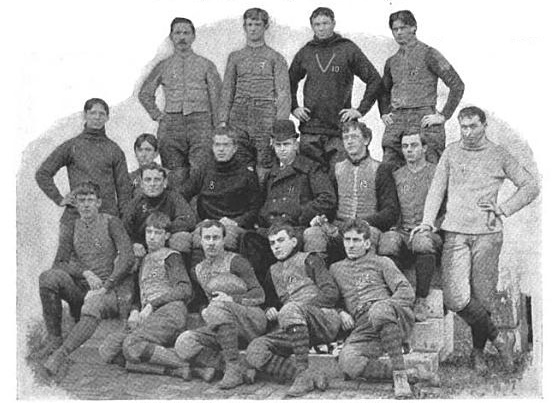
- Conference: Independent
- Record: 6–1
- Head coach: W. J. Keller (1st season)
- Captain: W. J. Keller
- Home stadium: Dudley Field

1893 Southern college football independents records
	Conf.			Overall
Team	W	L	T	W		L		T
Maryland		–		6	–	0	–	0
Texas		–		4	–	0	–	0
Central (KY)		–		2	–	0	–	0
Howard		–		2	–	0	–	0
North Carolina A&M		–		2	–	0	–	0
Vanderbilt		–		6	–	1	–	0
Auburn		–		3	–	0	–	2
Virginia		–		8	–	2	–	0
Ole Miss		–		4	–	1	–	0
Centre		–		4	–	1	–	0
Trinity (NC)		–		3	–	1	–	0
VMI		–		3	–	1	–	0
Kentucky State College		–		5	–	2	–	1
Delaware		–		2	–	1	–	0
Georgia Tech		–		2	–	1	–	0
Guilford		–		2	–	1	–	0
West Virginia		–		2	–	1	–	0
William & Mary		–		2	–	1	–	0
Navy		–		5	–	3	–	0
Richmond		–		3	–	2	–	0
Georgetown		–		4	–	4	–	0
Sewanee		–		3	–	3	–	0
Furman		–		1	–	1	–	0
Georgia		–		2	–	2	–	1
Western Maryland		–		1	–	1	–	0
Johns Hopkins		–		2	–	3	–	2
North Carolina		–		3	–	4	–	0
Tennessee		–		2	–	4	–	0
Tulane		–		1	–	2	–	0
Wake Forest		–		1	–	2	–	0
Hampden–Sydney		–		0	–	1	–	0
LSU		–		0	–	1	–	0
Maryville (TN)		–		0	–	1	–	0
Mercer		–		0	–	1	–	0
Wofford		–		0	–	1	–	0
VAMC		–		0	–	2	–	0
Alabama		–		0	–	4	–	0

The 1893 Vanderbilt Commodores football team represented Vanderbilt University during the 1893 college football season. The team's head coach and team captain was W. J. Keller, who only coached one season in that capacity at Vanderbilt. The season started 2–1 and finished with a four-game winning streak.

== Schedule ==
Date	Time	Opponent	Site	Result	Attendance	Source
October 21	3:00 p.m.	Memphis Athletic Club	Dudley Field; Nashville, TN	W 68–0	1,500	
October 28		at Sewanee	Hardee Field; Sewanee, TN (rivalry)	W 10–8		
November 6	3:30 p.m.	at Auburn	Riverside Park; Montgomery, AL	L 10–30	2,000	
November 12		Georgia	Dudley Field; Nashville, TN (rivalry)	W 35–0		
November 18	3:00 p.m.	at Louisville Athletic Club	Louisville, KY	W 36–12		
November 30	2:30 p.m.	Sewanee	Dudley Field; Nashville, TN	W 10–0	3,000	
December 2	2:30 p.m.	Central (KY)	Dudley Field; Nashville, TN	W 12–0		
All times are in Central time
