= Johnsons Station, Texas =

- Historical unincorporated community
- Location within Texas Location within the United States
- Coordinates: 32°41′31″N 97°07′41″W
- Country: United States
- State: Texas
- County: Tarrant
- Elevation: 673 ft (205 m)
- Time zone: UTC-6 (Central (CST))
  - Summer (DST): UTC-5 (CDT)
- GNIS feature ID: 1338821

Johnsons Station (Johnson Station) was an unincorporated community in Tarrant County, located in the U.S. state of Texas. The area is now within the city of Arlington.

On October 31, 1851, the first post office in Tarrant County was opened at Johnsons Station.
