= Centre–Kentucky rivalry =

American college sports rivalry

The Centre–Kentucky rivalry was an intercollegiate sports rivalry between Centre College in Danville, Kentucky and the University of Kentucky in Lexington, Kentucky. The two school first met in football in 1891 and basketball in 1906. The two rivals last played in 1929 in both sports.

== Football ==
Centre–Kentucky football rivalry
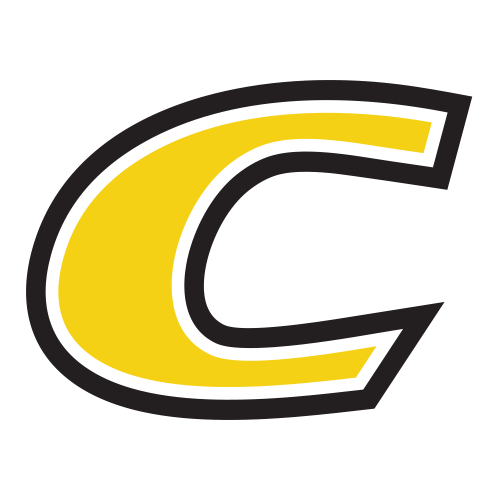
- Centre Colonels Kentucky Wildcats
- Sport: Football
- First meeting: December 19, 1891; Centre, 6–0
- Latest meeting: October 26, 1929; Kentucky, 33–0

Statistics
- Total meetings: 35
- All-time series: Centre, 21–12–2
- Largest victory: Kentucky, 81–0 (1904)
- Longest win streak: Centre, 7 (1917–1924)
- Current win streak: Kentucky, 3 (1927–1929)

Locations in Kentucky

=== Football series ===
Game in 1918 cancelled due to flu epidemic. Kentucky is known as Kentucky State College before 1913. Centre merges with Central in 1901.

Kentucky victories	Centre victories	Tie games

No.	Date	Location	Winner	Score
1	December 19, 1891	Lexington, KY	Centre	6–0
2	October 28, 1893	Danville, KY	Centre	6–4
3	November 17, 1894	Lexington, KY	Centre	67–0
4	October 19, 1895	Danville, KY	Kentucky State College	6–0
5	November 28, 1895	Lexington, KY	Centre	16–0
6	October 31, 1896	Danville, KY	Centre	32–0
7	November 14, 1896	Lexington, KY	Centre	44–0
8	November 25, 1897	Lexington, KY	Centre	36–0
9	November 5, 1898	Lexington, KY	Kentucky State College	6–0
10	October 21, 1899	Danville, KY	Tie	11–11
11	October 13, 1900	Danville, KY	Centre	5–0
12	November 16, 1901	Lexington, KY	Central University	5–0
13	November 1, 1902	Danville, KY	Central University	15–0
14	October 12, 1904	Danville, KY	Kentucky State College	40–0
15	November 19, 1904	Lexington, KY	Kentucky State College	81–0
16	November 25, 1905	Lexington, KY	Tie	11–11
17	November 29, 1906	Lexington, KY	Central University	12–6
18	November 28, 1907	Lexington, KY	Kentucky State College	11–0

No.	Date	Location	Winner	Score
19	November 26, 1908	Lexington, KY	Kentucky State College	40–0
20	November 25, 1909	Lexington, KY	Kentucky State College	15–6
21	November 24, 1910	Lexington, KY	Central University	12–6
22	November 23, 1911	Lexington, KY	Kentucky State College	8–5
23	October 7, 1916	Lexington, KY	Kentucky	68–0
24	November 3, 1917	Danville, KY	Centre	3–0
25	November 15, 1919	Danville, KY	Centre	56–0
26	November 13, 1920	Lexington, KY	Centre	49–0
27	November 5, 1921	Danville, KY	Centre	55–0
28	November 4, 1922	Lexington, KY	Centre	27–3
29	November 3, 1923	Danville, KY	Centre	10–0
30	November 1, 1924	Lexington, KY	Centre	7–0
31	October 31, 1925	Danville, KY	Kentucky	16–0
32	November 20, 1926	Lexington, KY	Centre	7–0
33	November 19, 1927	Danville, KY	Kentucky	53–0
34	October 27, 1928	Lexington, KY	Kentucky	8–0
35	October 26, 1929	Danville, KY	Kentucky	33–0
Series: Centre leads 20–13–2

== Basketball ==
Starting in 1906, Kentucky won the first three games but only before Centre College did the same, tying the series at 3. For the next three games Kentucky and Centre traded wins and the series lead, until Centre went on a five-game winning streak to break the tie.

The series was put on hold in 1910 and resumed in 1912 with Kentucky winning both games that year. The series was again put on hold for the 1913 and 1914 seasons. The next year the two met in Danville, with the result being the same, Kentucky blowing out Centre 38–5. Kentucky would win the next three games and extend their win streak to five, tying Centre's longest streak. The streak was snapped at five when Centre beat Kentucky twice in the next three games.

Starting in 1918 it was Centre's turn to dominate once again. The Colonels would rally of six straight wins over the Wildcats, once again taking the series lead over Kentucky. Kentucky would bounce back and win three straight games, but Centre responded by winning the following two. These two wins would be Centre's last against Kentucky.

Going into the '20s Kentucky held a losing record of 15–11 to their rival. Kentucky however was shedding its label as a struggling program under Coach Buncheit and later Coach Mauer. Kentucky would defeat Centre in every game after 1924, carrying their win streak to a total of 11 by the end of the series in 1930. The same year Coach Rupp would take the coaching job after John Mauer.

=== Basketball series ===
Centre–Kentucky men's basketball rivalry
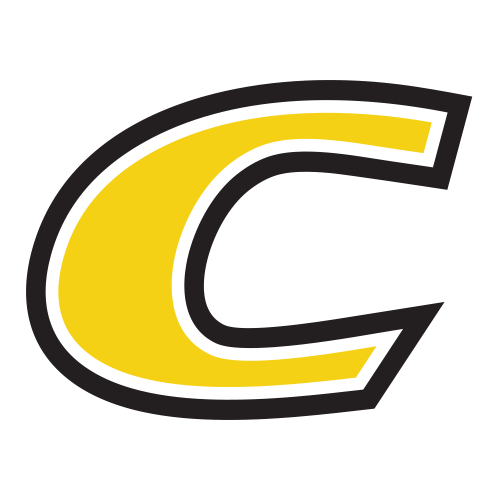
- Centre Colonels Kentucky Wildcats
- Sport: Men's Basketball
- First meeting: January 6, 1906
- Latest meeting: November 3, 2017
- Next meeting: Unscheduled

Statistics
- Total meetings: 36
- Most wins: Kentucky: 26
- All-time series: Kentucky 26 – 19 Centre
- Largest victory: Kentucky: 42 Points (1912) Centre: 70 Points (1910)
- Current win streak: Kentucky: 11 Wins (+1 Exhibition Win)

Kentucky victories	Centre victories	Tie games

No.	Date	Location	Winner	Score
1	January 19, 1906	Lexington, KY	Kentucky State College	15–14
2	January 26, 1906	Danville, KY	Kentucky State College	17–15
3	January 25, 1907	Lexington, KY	Kentucky State College	22–9
4	February 12, 1907	Danville, KY	Central University	25–23^{OT}
5	March 9, 1907	Lexington, KY	Central University	15–13
6	January 25, 1908	Danville, KY	Central University	32–21
7	February 13, 1908	Lexington, KY	Kentucky State College	31–20
8	March 7, 1908	Danville, KY	Central University	29–10
9	January 27, 1909	Lexington, KY	Kentucky State College	24–23
10	February 6, 1909	Danville, KY	Central University	35–20
11	February 26, 1909	Lexington, KY	Central University	26–20
12	January 28, 1910	Danville, KY	Central University	87–17
13	March 5, 1910	Lexington, KY	Central University	31–13
14	March 11, 1910	Danville, KY	Central University	51–9
15	January 12, 1912	Danville, KY	Kentucky State College	32–13
16	February 1, 1912	Lexington, KY	Kentucky State College	52–10
17	February 15, 1916	Danville, KY	Kentucky	38–5
18	February 29, 1916	Lexington, KY	Kentucky	38–14
19	January 17, 1917	Lexington, KY	Kentucky	31–21
20	February 16, 1917	Danville, KY	Centre College	28–24
21	January 17, 1918	Danville, KY	Centre College	29–21
22	February 21, 1918	Lexington, KY	Kentucky	22–20^{3 OT}
23	March 9, 1918	Louisville, KY	Centre College	24–12

No.	Date	Location	Winner	Score
24	January 25, 1919	Danville, KY	Centre College	38–30
25	February 24, 1919	Lexington, KY	Centre College	21–10
26	February 14, 1920	Danville, KY	Centre College	44–15
27	March 6, 1920	Lexington, KY	Centre College	20–18^{OT}
28	February 8, 1921	Danville, KY	Centre College	29–27
29	February 18, 1921	Lexington, KY	Kentucky	20–13
30	February 4, 1922	Danville, KY	Kentucky	28–21
31	February 20, 1922	Lexington, KY	Kentucky	40–23
32	January 27, 1923	Lexington, KY	Centre College	21–14
33	February 14, 1923	Danville, KY	Centre College	17–10
34	February 9, 1924	Danville, KY	Kentucky	27–18
35	February 21, 1924	Lexington, KY	Kentucky	38–24
36	January 17, 1925	Lexington, KY	Kentucky	33–26
37	February 21, 1925	Lexington, KY	Kentucky	39–10
38	January 22, 1926	Lexington, KY	Kentucky	45–25
39	February 4, 1926	Danville, KY	Kentucky	46–19
40	January 29, 1927	Lexington, KY	Kentucky	27–25
41	February 12, 1927	Danville, KY	Kentucky	22–16
42	January 9, 1928	Danville, KY	Kentucky	36–23
43	February 18, 1928	Lexington, KY	Kentucky	30–20
44	February 13, 1929	Lexington, KY	Kentucky	47–11
45	November 3, 2017	Lexington, KY	Kentucky	106–63^{Exhibition}
Series: Kentucky leads 26–19

== See also ==
- List of NCAA college football rivalry games
