= Howard Ijams =

American football player and physician (1873–1923)

Tennessee Volunteers
- Position: Quarterback
- Class: 1893

Personal information
- Born: April 10, 1873; Tennessee
- Died: March 7, 1923 (aged 49); Knoxville, Tennessee

Career information
- College: Tennessee (1891–1893)

Howard Aiken Ijams (April 10, 1873 – March 7, 1923) was a physician. He was the first quarterback in the history of the Tennessee Volunteers football team. He played on the team from the 1891 season to the 1893 season.
