= 1893 Penn State football team =

American college football season

1893 Penn State football
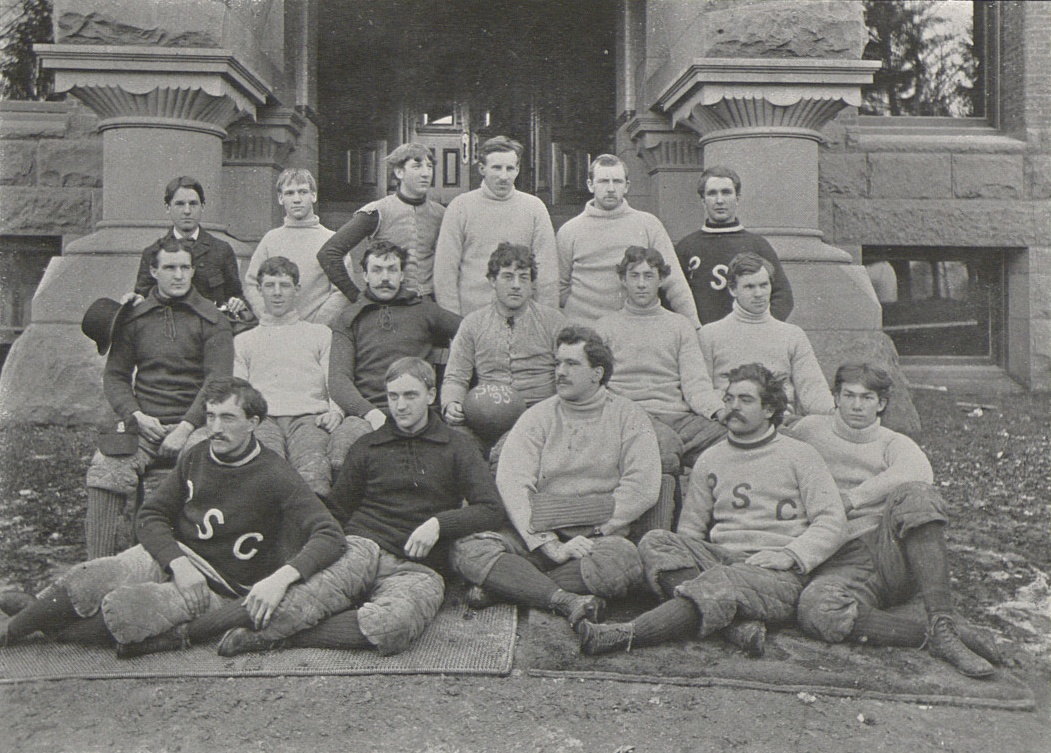
- Conference: Independent
- Record: 4–1
- Head coach: George W. Hoskins (2nd season)
- Captain: Ed Haley
- Home stadium: Beaver Field

1893 Eastern college football independents records
	Conf.			Overall
Team	W	L	T	W		L		T
Princeton		–		11	–	0	–	0
Fordham		–		4	–	0	–	0
Harvard		–		12	–	1	–	0
Yale		–		10	–	1	–	0
Colgate		–		3	–	0	–	2
Penn		–		12	–	3	–	0
Penn State		–		4	–	1	–	0
Wesleyan		–		4	–	1	–	0
Holy Ghost		–		6	–	2	–	0
Swarthmore		–		6	–	2	–	1
Lehigh		–		7	–	3	–	0
Brown		–		6	–	3	–	0
Carlisle		–		2	–	1	–	0
Franklin & Marshall		–		4	–	2	–	1
Navy		–		5	–	3	–	0
Washington & Jefferson		–		5	–	3	–	0
Drexel		–		3	–	2	–	0
Bucknell		–		4	–	3	–	0
Boston College		–		3	–	3	–	0
Geneva		–		2	–	2	–	1
Army		–		4	–	5	–	0
Tufts		–		4	–	7	–	0
Cornell		–		3	–	6	–	1
Worcester Tech		–		2	–	4	–	1
Boston University		–		1	–	2	–	0
Lafayette		–		3	–	6	–	0
Syracuse		–		4	–	9	–	1
Western Penn		–		1	–	4	–	0
MIT		–		1	–	5	–	0
Massachusetts		–		1	–	9	–	0
New Hampshire		–		0	–	1	–	0
Rutgers		–		0	–	4	–	0
Maine		–		0	–	5	–	0

The 1893 Penn State football team was an American football team that represented Pennsylvania State College—now known as Pennsylvania State University–as an independent during the 1893 college football season. The team was coached by George W. Hoskins. It was first team to play on Beaver Field, Penn State football's first permanent home.

== Schedule ==
Date	Time	Opponent	Site	Result	Attendance	Source
October 14		at Virginia	Madison Hall Field; Charlottesville, VA	W 6–0		
October 16		at Columbia Athletic Club	Capitol Park; Washington, DC	L 6–12 (Note: Penn State protested this result on account of alleged cheating by the referee, a Columbia AC member. According to the school newspaper, "though the score as sent out from Washington was 12–6 in favor of C. A. C., all fair-minded people and lovers of foot ball will give it to us 6–0. And so we will always record it." The school yearbook likewise listed the result as a 6–0 Penn State victory; however, the game has disappeared from official Penn State records as published in the university's football media guide.)		
October 25		at Penn	University Athletic Grounds; Philadelphia, PA	L 6–18	3,000	
November 6		Western University of Pennsylvania	Beaver Field; State College, PA (rivalry)	W 32–0		
November 11	2:30 p.m.	at Bucknell	Bucknell campus; Lewisburg, PA	W 36–18	2,000	
November 30		at Pittsburgh Athletic Club	PAC Park; Pittsburgh, PA	W 12–0		
