= 1893 Western University of Pennsylvania football team =

American college football season

1893 Western University of Pennsylvania football
- Conference: Independent
- Record: 1–4
- Head coach: Anson Harrold (1st season)

1893 Eastern college football independents records
	Conf.			Overall
Team	W	L	T	W		L		T
Princeton		–		11	–	0	–	0
Fordham		–		4	–	0	–	0
Harvard		–		12	–	1	–	0
Yale		–		10	–	1	–	0
Colgate		–		3	–	0	–	2
Penn		–		12	–	3	–	0
Penn State		–		4	–	1	–	0
Wesleyan		–		4	–	1	–	0
Holy Ghost		–		6	–	2	–	0
Swarthmore		–		6	–	2	–	1
Lehigh		–		7	–	3	–	0
Brown		–		6	–	3	–	0
Carlisle		–		2	–	1	–	0
Franklin & Marshall		–		4	–	2	–	1
Navy		–		5	–	3	–	0
Washington & Jefferson		–		5	–	3	–	0
Drexel		–		3	–	2	–	0
Bucknell		–		4	–	3	–	0
Amherst		–		7	–	6	–	1
Boston College		–		3	–	3	–	0
Geneva		–		2	–	2	–	1
Army		–		4	–	5	–	0
Williams		–		2	–	3	–	1
Tufts		–		4	–	7	–	0
Cornell		–		3	–	6	–	1
Worcester Tech		–		2	–	4	–	1
Boston University		–		1	–	2	–	0
Lafayette		–		3	–	6	–	0
Syracuse		–		4	–	9	–	1
Western Penn		–		1	–	4	–	0
MIT		–		1	–	5	–	0
Massachusetts		–		1	–	9	–	0
New Hampshire		–		0	–	1	–	0
Rutgers		–		0	–	4	–	0
Maine		–		0	–	5	–	0

The 1893 Western University of Pennsylvania football team was an American football team that represented the Western University of Pennsylvania (now known as the University of Pittsburgh) as an independent during the 1893 college football season.

== Schedule ==
Date	Opponent	Site	Result	Attendance	Source
October 7	at Pittsburgh Athletic Club	P.A.C. Park; Pittsburgh, PA	L 0–10	1,000	
October 14	at Allegheny Athletic Association	AAA Park; Allegheny, PA	W 4–0		
October 21	at Greensburg Athletic Association	Greensburg, PA	cancelled		
October 28	at Pittsburgh Athletic Club	P.A.C. Park; Pittsburgh, PA	L 10–16		
November 6	at Penn State	Beaver Field; State College, PA (rivalry)	L 0–32		
November 11	at Geneva	Beaver Falls, PA	cancelled		
November 25	at Washington & Jefferson	College Park; Washington, PA	L 0–12		

== Season recap ==
The 1893 Western University of Pennsylvania (WUP) football team started the season with a seven-game schedule arranged by manager Robert C. Brown. This was the first year the WUP contingent had a coach. Anson Harrold, a tackle on the Franklin & Marshall and later the Princeton football eleven, took on the assignment. Joe Trees was appointed captain. In its first and only season under head coach Anson Harrold, the team compiled a 1–4 record and was outscored by a total of 70 to 14.

According to Edwin V. D. Johnston (Mechanical Engineering, 1897) in a February 16, 1921 Pitt Weekly article: "The 1893 team was managed by R. C. Brown and was considered very good for those times, including such men as 'Joe' Trees, Floyd Rose, the Fiscus brothers and 'Ted' Boden, a fellow who had the spiral punt down to perfection. We also had a good second team which I believe won every game it played. I was proud to be manager and right end for that team and we were greatly shocked when W. & J. beat our first team."

== Game summaries ==
=== At Pittsburgh Athletic Club ===
WUP at Pittsburg Athletic Club

Team	1	2	Total
WUP	0	0	0
• P. A. C.	6	4	10

- Date: October 7, 1893
- Location: East End Grounds (Liberty Park), Pittsburgh
- Game attendance: 1,000
- Referee: W.F. Casey

The opener was played October 7 against the Pittsburgh Athletic Club (PAC) in front of a thousand fans on the East End Club grounds. The game started as a defensive struggle but after twenty minutes of play PAC halfback Grant Dibert was able to score on a thirty-yard run. Reed kicked the goal and the tally was 6–0 in favor of PAC at halftime. The second half was again a defensive struggle. Captain Charley Aull finally broke through the line from three yards out and scored another touchdown for PAC. The kick for goal failed and the score stood at 10–0 in favor of the PAC when the game came to an end.

The WUP lineup for the Pittsburgh A.C. game was Jesse Price (left end), A.F. Harrold (left tackle), Ross Fiscus (left guard), Ruben Rose (center), Newell Fiscus (right guard), Joe Trees (right tackle), Al Marshall (right end), Floyd Rose (quarterback), George Neale (left Halfback), L. Marchand (right halfback) and Ted Boden (fullback). Ross Fiscus replaced Coach Harrold at left tackle and Samuel Hill replaced Ross Fiscus at left guard.

=== At Allegheny Athletic Association ===
WUP at Allegheny AA

Team	1	2	Total
• WUP	0	4	4
Allegheny AA	0	0	0

- Date: October 14, 1893
- Location: AAA Park, Pittsburgh
- Game attendance: 100+
- Referee: W.F. Casey

On a rainy October 14, the Allegheny Athletic Association and the WUP elevens played in the mud. Due to the muddy conditions, this game was a defensive struggle with fumbles occurring frequently. Price, Flowers, Neale and Harrold all played well for the WUP. Their offense advanced the ball to the 15 yard line as time expired in the first half. Midway through the second half George Neale was able to skirt the end for thirty-five yards and score a touchdown. Coach Harrold's try for goal failed and the score read 4–0 in favor of the Western U. The Alleghenies continued to battle with Valentine, Wright and Van Cleve gaining good yardage, but the WUP defense prevailed for the 4–0 victory.

The WUP lineup for the A.A.A. game was Jesse Price (left end), A.F. Harrold (left tackle), Samuel Hill (left guard), Ruben Rose (center), Ross Fiscus (right guard), Joe Trees (right tackle), Al Marshall (right end), Floyd Rose (quarterback), George Neale (left Halfback), L. Marchand (right halfback) and John Flowers (fullback).

=== At Greensburg Athletic Association (cancelled) ===
In a strange twist of events, coach Anson Harrold, Joseph Trees and Ross Fiscus promised to play for the Allegheny Athletic Association on Oct. 21 and were not available for the WUP contest with the Greensburg Athletic Association. This predicament would become a recurring problem for the WUP football teams for the next ten years. Manager Brown cancelled the game rather than play without three of the WUP's best players in the line-up.

=== At Pittsburgh Athletic Club ===
WUP at Pittsburg Athletic Club

Team	1	2	Total
WUP	6	4	10
• P. A. C.	10	6	16

- Date: October 28, 1893
- Location: East End Grounds (Liberty Park), Pittsburgh
- Game attendance: 250
- Referee: R. Brown

The WUP eleven was at full strength for the second match versus the PAC. The weather was again a factor, with rain causing slippery playing conditions. Dibert of the PAC scored three minutes into the game, and Read kicked the goal after for an early 6–0 lead. Midway through the half Dibert again raced toward the goal, but was tackled by Boden on the one yard line. Bert Aull scored on the next play. Read missed the goal after kick and the PAC led 10–0. On the ensuing drive the WUP offense successfully moved the ball down the field with McNeal and Boden doing most of the ball carrying. Neale finally pushed the ball over the goal for a WUP touchdown, which was the first score against the PAC in the 1893 season. Boden kicked the goal after and the score stood 10–6 in favor of the PAC at the halftime break. After an exchange of possessions in the second half, Martin and Dibert of the PAC moved the ball close to the WUP goal line and Ritchie carried it into the end zone. Read's kick after was successful and the score was 16–6 in favor of the PAC. The PACs were on the move again but Martin fumbled and Joe Trees picked up the ball and raced 65 yards for the WUP score. The final tally stood at 16–10 in favor of the PAC.

The WUP lineup for the Pittsburgh A.C. rematch was Jesse Price (left end), A.F. Harrold (left tackle), Samuel Hill (left guard), Ruben Rose (center), Ross Fiscus (right guard), Joe Trees (right tackle), Al Marshall (right end), Floyd Rose (quarterback), George Neale (left Halfback), McNeil (right halfback) and Ted Boden (fullback).

=== At Penn State ===
WUP at Penn State

Team	1	2	Total
WUP	0	0	0
• Penn State	12	20	32

- Date: November 6, 1893
- Location: Beaver Field, Bellefonte, PA
- Referee: McClean

The first game played between the Western University of Pennsylvania and the Pennsylvania State College was scheduled for November 4, but “Mother Nature” decided to deposit a heavy coat of snow on the borough of State College. The game was rescheduled for Monday the 6th. The State College eleven were wonderful hosts for the weekend, but they totally outplayed the university eleven on their new football field - Beaver Stadium. The Lions scored five touchdowns and offensively spent most of the game on the WUP end of the field. The WUP squad had no answer and lost 32–0.

The WUP lineup for the Penn State game was Jesse Price (left end), L. Marchand (left tackle), Samuel Hill (left guard), Hall (center), Ross Fiscus (right guard), Joe Trees (right tackle), Al Marshall (right end), Floyd Rose (quarterback), George Neale (left Halfback), McNeil (right halfback) and John Flowers(fullback). Ted Boden replaced John Flowers at fullback.

=== At Geneva ===
On November 11 the WUP team again failed to appear for their scheduled game. They were supposed to be in Beaver Falls to battle the Geneva College football team. Geneva was able to play a game with the Y.M.C.A. but The Pittsburgh Press criticized the behavior of the Western University. The actions of the three WUP students playing for the Club team and not the university team caused the manager to again forfeit a game.

=== At Washington & Jefferson ===
WUP at W. & J.

Team	1	2	Total
WUP	0	0	0
• W. & J.	0	12	12

- Date: November 25, 1893
- Location: College Park, Washington, PA

The WUP eleven concluded their 1893 season with a trip to Washington, Pennsylvania to take on the Washington & Jefferson. The Western U. boys moved the ball on the opening drive to the Washington & Jefferson five yard line where Ross Fiscus fumbled. The WUP offense would not get that close again. The scoreless first half ended with W & J on the one yard line about to score. Five minutes into the second half, W. & J. fullback Brownlee scampered thirty yards into the end zone for a touchdown. The kick after was good and Washington & Jefferson led 6–0. When W. & J. got the ball back they moved it steadily downfield and scored again. The final tally was 12–0.

The WUP lineup for the Washington & Jefferson game was Jesse Price (right end), L. Marchand (left tackle), Samuel Hill (left guard), Ruben Rose (center), Ross Fiscus (left halfback), Joe Trees (right guard), Al Marshall (left end), Floyd Rose (quarterback), George Neale (right tackle), McNeil (right halfback) and Ted Boden(fullback). George Neale was disqualified for slugging and replaced by John Cherry. The Western University of Pennsylvania finished the season with one win and four losses.

== Roster ==
The roster of the 1893 Western University of Pennsylvania football team:

- A. A. Marshall (end) received his Bachelor of Philosophy degree in 1894.
- Jesse Price (end) received his degree in Civil Engineering in 1894.
- Joe Trees tackle) received his Mechanical Engineering degree in 1895. Mr. Trees was WUP's first scholarship player. He was recruited from Indiana Normal. He struck it rich in the oil business and was most generous to his alma mater. He donated the money for the original Trees Gymnasium and Trees Field. Presently two facilities on campus bear his name – Trees Hall and Trees Field.
- Ross Fiscus (tackle) received his Associate Engineering degree in 1893 and resided in Wilkinsburg, Pennsylvania.
- John Cherry (tackle) received his Associate Engineering degree in 1893 and resided in Pittsburgh.
- Dr. Samuel S. Hill (guard) received his Doctor of Medicine degree in 1894 and became the Superintendent of the State Asylum in Wernersville, Pennsylvania.
- George A. Neale (halfback) received his Associate College degree in 1895.
- Floyd Rose (quarterback) was a three sport star at WUP – baseball, track and football. He received his degree from the college in 1896 and earned a degree in Metallurgical Engineering in 1911. He was president of Floyd Rose & Company, consulting engineers in Pittsburgh.
- Ted Boden (fullback) received an Associate Engineering degree in 1892.
- John Flowers (fullback) received an Associate College degree in 1897.
- Newell Fiscus (guard)
- McNeil (halfback)
- Hall (center)
- L. Marchand (halfback)
- Ruben Rose (center)

== Coaching staff ==
- Anson Harrold (coach/tackle) played football at Franklin & Marshall College and Princeton University before becoming the coach at WUP for the 1893 season. He later worked as a design engineer at Westinghouse and ultimately became president of the American Transformer Company in Newark, New Jersey.
- Robert C. Brown (team manager) graduated in 1894 with a degree in Civil Engineering and resided in Plainfield, NJ.
