= 1893 Syracuse Orangemen football team =

American college football season

1893 Syracuse Orangemen football
- Conference: Independent
- Record: 4–9–1
- Head coach: None
- Captain: George H. Bond
- Home stadium: Star Park

1893 Eastern college football independents records
	Conf.			Overall
Team	W	L	T	W		L		T
Princeton		–		11	–	0	–	0
Fordham		–		4	–	0	–	0
Harvard		–		12	–	1	–	0
Yale		–		10	–	1	–	0
Colgate		–		3	–	0	–	2
Penn		–		12	–	3	–	0
Penn State		–		4	–	1	–	0
Wesleyan		–		4	–	1	–	0
Holy Ghost		–		6	–	2	–	0
Swarthmore		–		6	–	2	–	1
Lehigh		–		7	–	3	–	0
Brown		–		6	–	3	–	0
Carlisle		–		2	–	1	–	0
Franklin & Marshall		–		4	–	2	–	1
Navy		–		5	–	3	–	0
Washington & Jefferson		–		5	–	3	–	0
Drexel		–		3	–	2	–	0
Bucknell		–		4	–	3	–	0
Boston College		–		3	–	3	–	0
Geneva		–		2	–	2	–	1
Army		–		4	–	5	–	0
Tufts		–		4	–	7	–	0
Cornell		–		3	–	6	–	1
Worcester Tech		–		2	–	4	–	1
Boston University		–		1	–	2	–	0
Lafayette		–		3	–	6	–	0
Syracuse		–		4	–	9	–	1
Western Penn		–		1	–	4	–	0
MIT		–		1	–	5	–	0
Massachusetts		–		1	–	9	–	0
New Hampshire		–		0	–	1	–	0
Rutgers		–		0	–	4	–	0
Maine		–		0	–	5	–	0

The 1893 Syracuse Orangemen football team represented Syracuse University as an independent during the 1893 college football season. The team captain was George H. Bond.

== Schedule ==
Date	Opponent	Site	Result	Attendance	Source
September 21	Syracuse Athletic Association	Syracuse, NY	L 0–22		
September 27	at Cornell	Percy Field; Ithaca, NY	L 0–50		
October 7	St. John's Military Academy	Syracuse, NY	L 16–24		
October 14	at Syracuse Athletic Association	Syracuse, NY	L 0–28	200	
October 21	St. John's Military Academy	Syracuse, NY	L 4–18	500	
October 26	at Colgate	Syracuse, NY (rivalry)	L 0–58		
October 31	Syracuse High School	Syracuse, NY	W 20–0		
November 4	at Hamilton	Clinton, NY	W 16–14		
November 11	at Union (NY)	Schenectady, NY	L 0–66		
November 15	at Syracuse Athletic Association	Syracuse, NY	L 4–28	75	
November 18	Rochester	Syracuse, NY	T 10–10		
November 30	at Rochester	Rochester, NY	L 0–6		
December 7	Onondaga Academy	Syracuse, NY	W 30–0		
December 14	Cazenovia	Syracuse, NY	W 24–0		
