= 1893 Crescent Athletic Club football team =

American college football season

1893 Crescent Athletic Club football
- Conference: American Football Union
- Record: 3–6 (1–2 AFU)
- Captain: J. Harry Sheldon
- Home stadium: Eastern Park

The 1893 Crescent Athletic Club football team was an American football team that represented the Crescent Athletic Club in the American Football Union (AFU) during the 1893 college football season. The team played its home games at Eastern Park in Brooklyn and compiled a 3–6 record. J. Harry Sheldon, a member of the Crescent team since 1887, served as the team's captain.

== Schedule ==
Date	Opponent	Site	Result	Attendance	Source
October 4	at Stevens*	St. George's Cricket Grounds; Hoboken, NJ	L 4–10		
October 7	Yale*	Eastern Park; Brooklyn, NY	L 0–16	2,000	
October 14	Princeton*	Eastern Park; Brooklyn, NY	L 0–26	> 1,000	
October 21	Penn*	Eastern Park; Brooklyn, NY	L 0–40	2,000	
October 28	Union (NY)*	Eastern Park; Brooklyn, NY	W 20–8		
November 4	Boston Athletic Association	Eastern Park; Brooklyn, NY	L 8–12		
November 7	Wesleyan*	Eastern Park; Brooklyn, NY	W 4–0		
November 11	New York Athletic Club	Eastern Park; Brooklyn, NY	W 36–0		
November 18	Orange Athletic Club	Eastern Park; Brooklyn, NY	L 4–20	2,000	
*Non-conference game
