= 1893 Harvard Crimson football team =

American college football season

1893 Harvard Crimson football
- Conference: Independent
- Record: 12–1
- Head coach: George A. Stewart (4th season); Everett J. Lake (1st season)
- Home stadium: Jarvis Field

1893 Eastern college football independents records
| | Conf. | | | Overall |
| Team | W | L | T | W | | L | | T |
|---|---|---|---|---|---|---|---|---|
| Princeton | | – | | 11 | – | 0 | – | 0 |
| Fordham | | – | | 4 | – | 0 | – | 0 |
| Harvard | | – | | 12 | – | 1 | – | 0 |
| Yale | | – | | 10 | – | 1 | – | 0 |
| Colgate | | – | | 3 | – | 0 | – | 2 |
| Penn | | – | | 12 | – | 3 | – | 0 |
| Penn State | | – | | 4 | – | 1 | – | 0 |
| Wesleyan | | – | | 4 | – | 1 | – | 0 |
| Holy Ghost | | – | | 6 | – | 2 | – | 0 |
| Swarthmore | | – | | 6 | – | 2 | – | 1 |
| Lehigh | | – | | 7 | – | 3 | – | 0 |
| Brown | | – | | 6 | – | 3 | – | 0 |
| Carlisle | | – | | 2 | – | 1 | – | 0 |
| Franklin & Marshall | | – | | 4 | – | 2 | – | 1 |
| Navy | | – | | 5 | – | 3 | – | 0 |
| Washington & Jefferson | | – | | 5 | – | 3 | – | 0 |
| Drexel | | – | | 3 | – | 2 | – | 0 |
| Bucknell | | – | | 4 | – | 3 | – | 0 |
| Boston College | | – | | 3 | – | 3 | – | 0 |
| Geneva | | – | | 2 | – | 2 | – | 1 |
| Army | | – | | 4 | – | 5 | – | 0 |
| Tufts | | – | | 4 | – | 7 | – | 0 |
| Cornell | | – | | 3 | – | 6 | – | 1 |
| Worcester Tech | | – | | 2 | – | 4 | – | 1 |
| Boston University | | – | | 1 | – | 2 | – | 0 |
| Lafayette | | – | | 3 | – | 6 | – | 0 |
| Syracuse | | – | | 4 | – | 9 | – | 1 |
| Western Penn | | – | | 1 | – | 4 | – | 0 |
| MIT | | – | | 1 | – | 5 | – | 0 |
| Massachusetts | | – | | 1 | – | 9 | – | 0 |
| New Hampshire | | – | | 0 | – | 1 | – | 0 |
| Rutgers | | – | | 0 | – | 4 | – | 0 |
| Maine | | – | | 0 | – | 5 | – | 0 |

The 1893 Harvard Crimson football team represented Harvard University in the 1893 college football season. The Crimson finished with an 11–1 record. The team won its first 10 games but lost to Yale in the 11th game of the season by a score of 6–0.

== Schedule ==
| Date | Time | Opponent | Site | Result | Attendance | Source |
|---|---|---|---|---|---|---|
| September 30 | | Dartmouth | Jarvis Field; Cambridge, MA (rivalry) | W 16–0 | 2,000 | |
| October 4 | | at Phillips Exeter | Exeter, NH | W 54–0 | | |
| October 7 | 3:00 p.m. | Amherst | Jarvis Field; Cambridge, MA | W 32–0 | 3,000 | |
| October 11 | | Boston Tech | Cambridge, MA | W 34–0 | | |
| October 14 | 3:00 p.m. | Williams | Jarvis Field; Cambridge, MA | W 52–0 | | |
| October 21 | 2:45 p.m. | Dartmouth | Jarvis Field; Cambridge, MA | W 36–0 | 2,200 | |
| October 25 | | Harvard alumni | Cambridge, MA | W 6–0 | | |
| October 28 | 3:00 p.m. | Brown | Jarvis Field; Cambridge, MA | W 58–0 | 2,500 | |
| November 1 | | at Andover | Andover, MA | W 60–5 | | |
| November 4 | | vs. Cornell | Manhattan Field; New York NY | W 30–0 | 1,200 | |
| November 7 | | Boston Athletic Association | Cambridge, MA | W 10–0 | | |
| November 25 | | vs. Yale | Hampden Park; Springfield, MA (rivalry) | L 0–6 | | |
| November 30 | | Penn | Jarvis Field; Cambridge, MA (rivalry) | W 26–4 | 15,000 | |
