= Laurie Bliss =

American football player and coach (1872–1942)

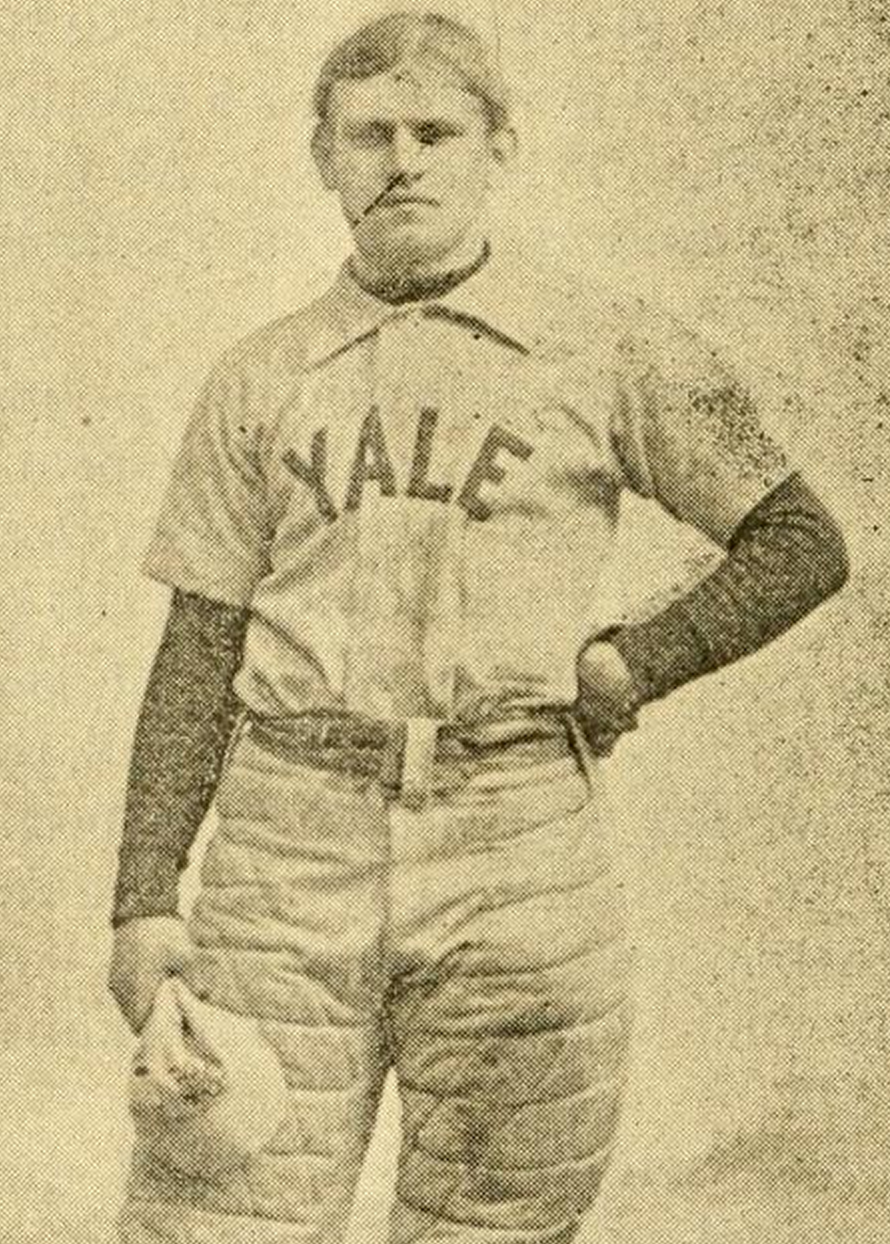
- Bliss pictured in The Official National Collegiate Athletic Association football guide, 1893

Biographical details
- Born: November 28, 1872; New York, New York, U.S.
- Died: November 12, 1942 (aged 69); Wilmington, Delaware, U.S.

Playing career
- 1890–1892: Yale
- 1893: Chicago Athletic Association
- Position: Halfback

Coaching career (HC unless noted)
- 1893: Army
- 1895: Lehigh

Head coaching record
- Overall: 7–11

Laurence Thornton "Laurie" Bliss (November 28, 1872 – November 12, 1942) was an American football player and coach. He served as the head football coach at the United States Military Academy in 1893 and at Lehigh University in 1895, compiling a career college football record of 7–11. Bliss played football at Yale University as a halfback alongside his brother, C. D. Bliss, who went on to coach at Stanford University, Haverford College, and the University of Missouri. After graduation, he played with the amateur Chicago Athletic Association.

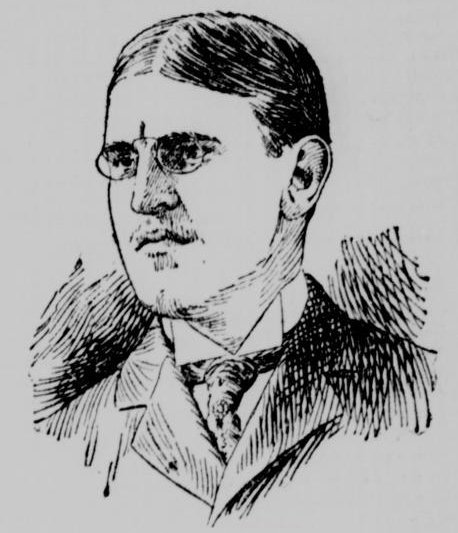
Laurie Bliss

== Coaching career ==
=== Army ===
Bliss took his first head coaching job at the United States Military Academy in 1893 and led the team to a 4–5 record. He was the third person appointed to the position of head football coach at West Point. The 1893 Army team lost to Navy and to Lehigh.

=== Lehigh ===
Bliss was the fourth head football coach at Lehigh University in Bethlehem, Pennsylvania and he held that position for the 1895 season. His coaching record at Lehigh was 3–6.

== Head coaching record ==
Year	Team	Overall	Conference	Standing	Bowl/playoffs
Army Cadets (Independent) (1893)
1893	Army	4–5			
Army:		4–5			
Lehigh (Independent) (1895)
1895	Lehigh	3–6			
Lehigh:		3–6			
Total:		7–11			
