= 1893 Lafayette football team =

American college football season

1893 Lafayette football
- Conference: Independent
- Record: 3–6
- Head coach: Pearl T. Haskell, H. H. Vincent (1st season)
- Captain: Ernest Edwards
- Home stadium: The Quad

1893 Eastern college football independents records
	Conf.			Overall
Team	W	L	T	W		L		T
Princeton		–		11	–	0	–	0
Fordham		–		4	–	0	–	0
Harvard		–		12	–	1	–	0
Yale		–		10	–	1	–	0
Colgate		–		3	–	0	–	2
Penn		–		12	–	3	–	0
Penn State		–		4	–	1	–	0
Wesleyan		–		4	–	1	–	0
Holy Ghost		–		6	–	2	–	0
Swarthmore		–		6	–	2	–	1
Lehigh		–		7	–	3	–	0
Brown		–		6	–	3	–	0
Carlisle		–		2	–	1	–	0
Franklin & Marshall		–		4	–	2	–	1
Navy		–		5	–	3	–	0
Washington & Jefferson		–		5	–	3	–	0
Drexel		–		3	–	2	–	0
Bucknell		–		4	–	3	–	0
Amherst		–		7	–	6	–	1
Boston College		–		3	–	3	–	0
Geneva		–		2	–	2	–	1
Army		–		4	–	5	–	0
Williams		–		2	–	3	–	1
Tufts		–		4	–	7	–	0
Cornell		–		3	–	6	–	1
Worcester Tech		–		2	–	4	–	1
Boston University		–		1	–	2	–	0
Lafayette		–		3	–	6	–	0
Syracuse		–		4	–	9	–	1
Western Penn		–		1	–	4	–	0
MIT		–		1	–	5	–	0
Massachusetts		–		1	–	9	–	0
New Hampshire		–		0	–	1	–	0
Rutgers		–		0	–	4	–	0
Maine		–		0	–	5	–	0

The 1893 Lafayette football team was an American football team that represented Lafayette College as an independent during the 1893 college football season. In its first year under head coaches Pearl T. Haskell and H. H. Vincent, the team compiled a 3–6 record. Ernest Edwards was the team captain. The team played its home games on The Quad in Easton, Pennsylvania.

== Schedule ==
Date	Time	Opponent	Site	Result	Attendance	Source
September 30	4:10 p.m.	at Princeton	University Field; Princeton, NJ	L 0–20	1,200–3,000	
October 4		Temperance A.A.	Easton, PA	W 6–0		
October 7	3:30 p.m.	at Army	The Plain; West Point, NY	L 0–36	1,200	
October 14		at Orange Athletic Club	Orange Oval; East Orange, NJ	L 0–6		
October 25		at Stevens	St. George Cricket Club grounds; Hoboken, NJ	W 12–10		
October 28		at Penn	University Athletic Grounds; Philadelphia, PA	W 0–82		
November 8		at Lehigh	Bethlehem, PA (rivalry)	L 6–22		
November 11		Rutgers	Easton PA	W (forfeit)		
November 18		Lehigh	Easton PA	L 0–10		
