= 1893 New Hampshire football team =

American college football season

1893 New Hampshire football
- Conference: Independent
- Record: 0–1
- Head coach: None
- Home stadium: n/a

1893 Eastern college football independents records
	Conf.			Overall
Team	W	L	T	W		L		T
Princeton		–		11	–	0	–	0
Fordham		–		4	–	0	–	0
Harvard		–		12	–	1	–	0
Yale		–		10	–	1	–	0
Colgate		–		3	–	0	–	2
Penn		–		12	–	3	–	0
Penn State		–		4	–	1	–	0
Wesleyan		–		4	–	1	–	0
Holy Ghost		–		6	–	2	–	0
Swarthmore		–		6	–	2	–	1
Lehigh		–		7	–	3	–	0
Brown		–		6	–	3	–	0
Carlisle		–		2	–	1	–	0
Franklin & Marshall		–		4	–	2	–	1
Navy		–		5	–	3	–	0
Washington & Jefferson		–		5	–	3	–	0
Drexel		–		3	–	2	–	0
Bucknell		–		4	–	3	–	0
Amherst		–		7	–	6	–	1
Boston College		–		3	–	3	–	0
Geneva		–		2	–	2	–	1
Army		–		4	–	5	–	0
Williams		–		2	–	3	–	1
Tufts		–		4	–	7	–	0
Cornell		–		3	–	6	–	1
Worcester Tech		–		2	–	4	–	1
Boston University		–		1	–	2	–	0
Lafayette		–		3	–	6	–	0
Syracuse		–		4	–	9	–	1
Western Penn		–		1	–	4	–	0
MIT		–		1	–	5	–	0
Massachusetts		–		1	–	9	–	0
New Hampshire		–		0	–	1	–	0
Rutgers		–		0	–	4	–	0
Maine		–		0	–	5	–	0

The 1893 New Hampshire football team (Note: The school did not adopt the Wildcats nickname until February 1926; before then, they were generally referred to as "the blue and white".) was an American football team that represented New Hampshire College of Agriculture and the Mechanic Arts (Note: The school was often referred to as New Hampshire College or New Hampshire State College in newspapers of the era.) during the 1893 college football season—the school became the University of New Hampshire in 1923. This was the first year that the college fielded a football team, which lost the only game it played.

== Schedule ==
Scoring during this era awarded 4 points for a touchdown, 2 points for a conversion kick (extra point), and 5 points for a field goal. Teams played in the one-platoon system and the forward pass was not yet legal. Games were played in two halves rather than four quarters.

Date	Opponent	Site	Result	Source
November 4	at Newmarket (Note: College Football Data Warehouse identifies the opponent as Newmarket High School, while the Wildcats' media guide and the contemporary The Enaichsee do not specify a high school team.)	Newmarket, NH	L 0–10	

Game summary

- Date: November 4, 1893
- Game weather: Rain
- Referee: G. L. Teeple of Durham
- Umpire: C. S. Haley of Newmarket

	1	2	Total
NHC	0	0	0
Newmarket	4	6	10

Scoring
First half

- Newmarket – Mellows run (Mellows kick failed). NHC 0, Newmarket 4

Second half

- Newmarket – Griffin run (Mellows kick good). NHC 0, Newmarket 10

Time: 40 minutes

NHC roster: Whittemore (C), Forrestal (RG), Sprague (RT), Brown (RE), Wiggin (LG), Russell (LT), Shattuck (LE), Roberts (QB), Howe (HB), Janvrin (HB), Demeritte (FB)

Newmarket roster: Barrett (C), Simpson (RG), G. Evans (RT), P. Griffin (RE), Walker (LG), Kennedy (LT), Maguire (LE), Haley (QB), W. Evans (HB), M. Griffin (HB), Mellows (FB)

== See also ==
- History of American football
