= 1893 Swarthmore Quakers football team =

American college football season

1893 Swarthmore Quakers football
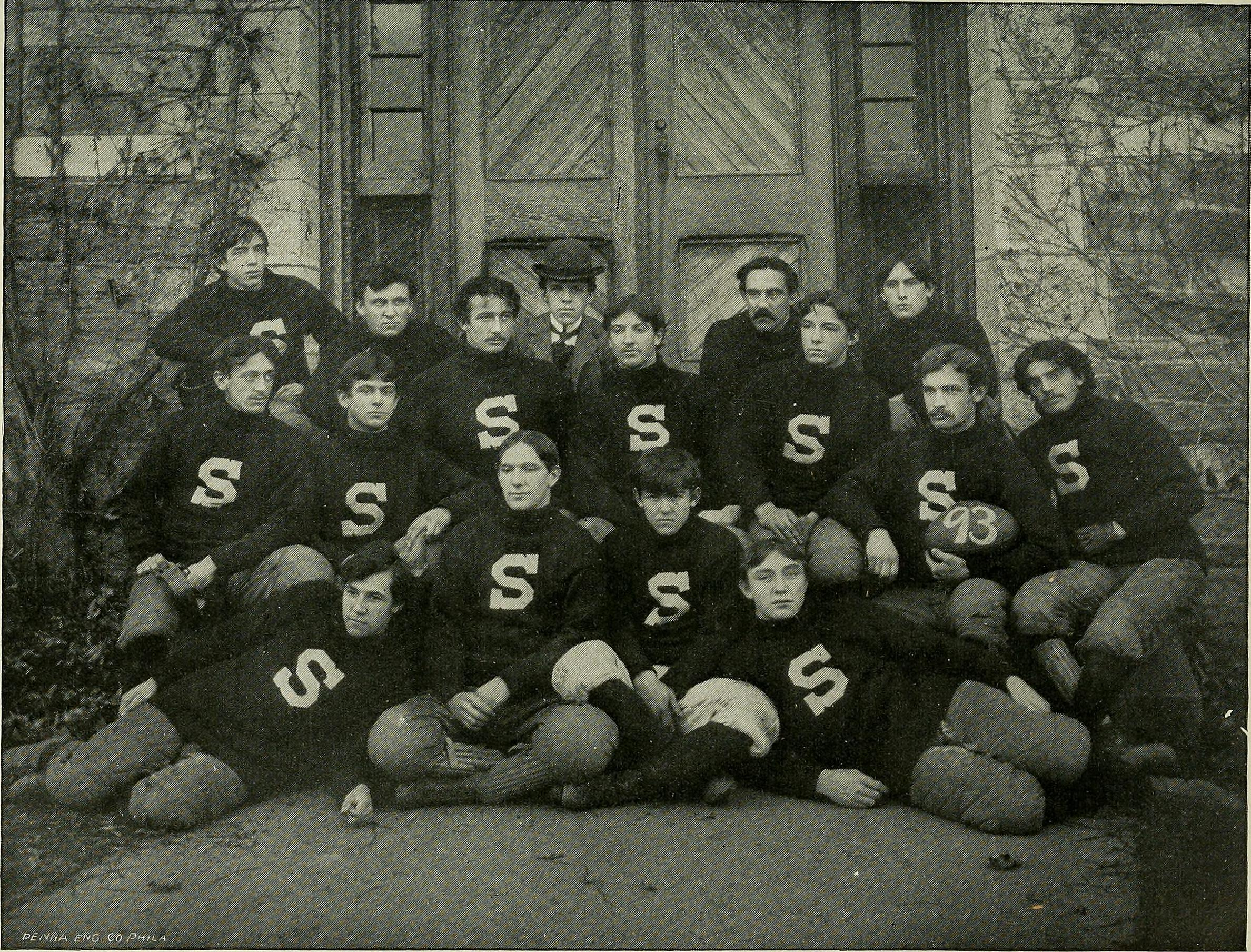
- Conference: Independent
- Record: 6–2–1
- Head coach: Jacob K. Shell (6th season)
- Home stadium: Whittier Field

1893 Eastern college football independents records
	Conf.			Overall
Team	W	L	T	W		L		T
Princeton		–		11	–	0	–	0
Fordham		–		4	–	0	–	0
Harvard		–		12	–	1	–	0
Yale		–		10	–	1	–	0
Colgate		–		3	–	0	–	2
Penn		–		12	–	3	–	0
Penn State		–		4	–	1	–	0
Wesleyan		–		4	–	1	–	0
Holy Ghost		–		6	–	2	–	0
Swarthmore		–		6	–	2	–	1
Lehigh		–		7	–	3	–	0
Brown		–		6	–	3	–	0
Carlisle		–		2	–	1	–	0
Franklin & Marshall		–		4	–	2	–	1
Navy		–		5	–	3	–	0
Washington & Jefferson		–		5	–	3	–	0
Drexel		–		3	–	2	–	0
Bucknell		–		4	–	3	–	0
Boston College		–		3	–	3	–	0
Geneva		–		2	–	2	–	1
Army		–		4	–	5	–	0
Tufts		–		4	–	7	–	0
Cornell		–		3	–	6	–	1
Worcester Tech		–		2	–	4	–	1
Boston University		–		1	–	2	–	0
Lafayette		–		3	–	6	–	0
Syracuse		–		4	–	9	–	1
Western Penn		–		1	–	4	–	0
MIT		–		1	–	5	–	0
Massachusetts		–		1	–	9	–	0
New Hampshire		–		0	–	1	–	0
Rutgers		–		0	–	4	–	0
Maine		–		0	–	5	–	0

The 1893 Swarthmore Quakers football team was an American football team that represented Swarthmore College as an independent during the 1893 college football season. The team compiled a 6–2–1 record and outscored opponents by a total of 222 to 70. Jacob K. Shell was the head coach.

== Schedule ==
Date	Opponent	Site	Result	Source
September 30	at Philadelphia YMCA	Philadelphia, PA	W 18–0	
October 14	at Johns Hopkins	Baltimore, MD	T 12–12	
October 18	at Penn JV	Philadelphia, PA	W 30–0	
October 21	at Georgetown	Boundary Field; Washington, DC	L 10–34	
October 25	Media Academy	Swarthmore, PA	W 32–0	
November 1	Bucknell	Swarthmore, PA	W 36–0	
November 8	at Pennsylvania Military	Chester, PA	W 34–16	
November 11	at Franklin & Marshall	Lancaster, PA	L 0–8	
November 25	at Haverford	Haverford, PA (rivalry)	W 50–0	
