= 1893 Orange Athletic Club football team =

American college football season

1893 Orange Athletic Club football

AFU champion
- Conference: American Football Union
- Record: 7–2 (2–0 AFU)
- Head coach: Alexander Hamilton Wallis
- Home stadium: Orange Oval

The 1893 Orange Athletic Club football team was an American football team that represented the Orange Athletic Club in the American Football Union (AFU) during the 1893 college football season. The AFU in 1893 consisted of three amateur football teams – the Orange Athletic Club, the New York Athletic Club from Manhattan, and the Crescent Athletic Club from Brooklyn. The Orange team played its home games at the Orange Oval in East Orange, New Jersey, compiled a 7–2 record (2–0 against AFU opponents), and won the AFU championship.

== Schedule ==
| Date | Time | Opponent | Site | Result | Attendance | Source |
|---|---|---|---|---|---|---|
| September 30 | 3:30 p.m. | Stevens* | Orange Oval; East Orange, NJ | W 12–0 | 800 | |
| October 7 | | Volunteer F.C.* | Orange Oval; East Orange, NJ | W 10–4 | | |
| October 14 | | Lafayette* | Orange Oval; East Orange, NJ | W 6–0 | | |
| October 21 | | Yale* | Orange Oval; East Orange, NJ | L 0–50 | 2,000 | |
| October 28 | | Rutgers* | Orange Oval; East Orange, NJ | W 22–0 | | |
| November 4 | | New York Athletic Club | Orange Oval; East Orange, NJ | W 4–0 (forfeit) | | |
| November 7 | | Princeton* | Orange Oval; East Orange, NJ | L 0–8 | 3,500 | |
| November 11 | | Yale Law* | Orange Oval; East Orange, NJ | W 18–0 | | |
| November 18 | | at Crescent Athletic Club | Eastern Park; Brooklyn, NY | W 20–4 | 2,000 | |
*Non-conference game
