= 1893 Penn Quakers football team =

American college football season

1893 Penn Quakers football
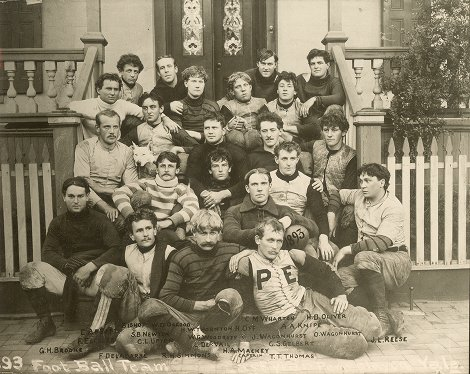
- Conference: Independent
- Record: 12–3
- Head coach: George Washington Woodruff (2nd season)
- Captain: Harry Arista Mackey
- Home stadium: University Athletic Grounds

1893 Eastern college football independents records
	Conf.			Overall
Team	W	L	T	W		L		T
Princeton		–		11	–	0	–	0
Fordham		–		4	–	0	–	0
Harvard		–		12	–	1	–	0
Yale		–		10	–	1	–	0
Colgate		–		3	–	0	–	2
Penn		–		12	–	3	–	0
Penn State		–		4	–	1	–	0
Wesleyan		–		4	–	1	–	0
Holy Ghost		–		6	–	2	–	0
Swarthmore		–		6	–	2	–	1
Lehigh		–		7	–	3	–	0
Brown		–		6	–	3	–	0
Carlisle		–		2	–	1	–	0
Franklin & Marshall		–		4	–	2	–	1
Navy		–		5	–	3	–	0
Washington & Jefferson		–		5	–	3	–	0
Drexel		–		3	–	2	–	0
Bucknell		–		4	–	3	–	0
Boston College		–		3	–	3	–	0
Geneva		–		2	–	2	–	1
Army		–		4	–	5	–	0
Tufts		–		4	–	7	–	0
Cornell		–		3	–	6	–	1
Worcester Tech		–		2	–	4	–	1
Boston University		–		1	–	2	–	0
Lafayette		–		3	–	6	–	0
Syracuse		–		4	–	9	–	1
Western Penn		–		1	–	4	–	0
MIT		–		1	–	5	–	0
Massachusetts		–		1	–	9	–	0
New Hampshire		–		0	–	1	–	0
Rutgers		–		0	–	4	–	0
Maine		–		0	–	5	–	0

The 1893 Penn Quakers football team represented the University of Pennsylvania in the 1893 college football season. The Quakers finished with a 12–3 record in their second year under head coach and College Football Hall of Fame inductee, George Washington Woodruff. Significant games included victories over Navy (34–0), Penn State (18–6), Lafayette (82–0), and Cornell (50–0), and losses to national champion Princeton (4–0), Yale (14–6), and Harvard (26–4). The 1893 Penn team outscored its opponents by a combined total of 484 to 62. No Penn players were honored on the 1893 College Football All-America Team, as all such honors went to players on the Princeton, Harvard and Yale teams.

== Schedule ==
Date	Opponent	Site	Result	Attendance	Source
September 30	Franklin & Marshall	University Athletic Grounds; Philadelphia, PA	W 48–0	2,000	
October 4	Gettysburg	University Athletic Grounds; Philadelphia, PA	W 74–0		
October 7	Columbia Athletic Club	Philadelphia, PA	W 30–0	2,200	
October 9	at Columbia Athletic Club	Washington, DC	W 20–6		
October 10	at Georgetown	National League Ball Grounds; Washington, DC	W 12–0		
October 11	at Navy	Worden Field; Annapolis, MD	W 34–0		
October 14	Volunteer Athletic Club	University Athletic Grounds; Philadelphia, PA	W 34–0	2,000	
October 18	at Lehigh	Bethlehem, PA	W 32–6	2,000	
October 21	at Crescent Athletic Club	Eastern Park; Brooklyn, NY	W 40–0	2,000	
October 25	Penn State	University Athletic Grounds; Philadelphia	W 18–6	3,000	
October 28	Lafayette	University Athletic Grounds; Philadelphia, PA	W 82–0		
November 4	Princeton	Germantown Cricket Club; Philadelphia, PA (rivalry)	L 0–4	18,000	
November 11	vs. Yale	Manhattan Field; New York, NY	L 6–14	15,000	
November 18	Cornell	Germantown Cricket Club; Philadelphia, PA (rivalry)	W 50–0	6,000	
November 30	at Harvard	Jarvis Field; Cambridge, MA (rivalry)	L 4–26	15,000	
