= William Odlin =

American lawyer and college football coach (1865–1929)

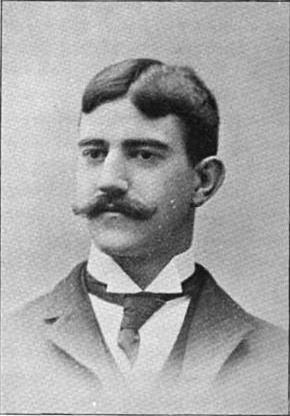

Biographical details
- Born: April 5, 1865; Laconia, New Hampshire, U.S.
- Died: May 11, 1929 (aged 64); Andover, Massachusetts, U.S.

Playing career
- 1886–1889: Dartmouth
- Position: Fullback

Coaching career (HC unless noted)
- 1893: Brown

Head coaching record
- Overall: 6–3

William Odlin (April 5, 1865 – May 11, 1929) was an American lawyer and college football coach. He served as the head football coach at Brown University in 1893.

Odlin was born on April 5, 1865, in Laconia, New Hampshire. He attended boarding school at Phillips Academy in Andover, Massachusetts. He continued his education at Dartmouth College, from which he graduated in 1890. Odlin is credited with reviving interest in football at the college. As John Henry Bartlett put it in his book, Dartmouth Athletics:

The Rugby game, started and grown moderately popular under Clarence Howland, had become almost obsolete at Dartmouth by '86, when Odlin entered college, and his laborious efforts to place it on a firm footing entitle him to a foremost place in the history of athletics at Dartmouth. He labored against the general sentiment of the college, the frowns of the faculty and a lack of experienced material, but the fruition of his labors was seen in the great championship team of '89, of which he was captain."

Odlin played on the football team as a fullback, and served as its captain for four years, from 1886 to 1889. Upon graduation, he continued on to study law, which he practiced in Boston with the firm Odlin & Ruggles.

In 1893, he took over as the head coach of the Brown University football team. He served in that position for one season and amassed a 6–3 record.

Odlin died on May 11, 1929, at his home in Andover, Massachusetts.

== Head coaching record ==
| Year | Team | Overall | Conference | Standing | Bowl/playoffs |
|---|---|---|---|---|---|
Brown Bears (Independent) (1893)
| 1893 | Brown | 6–3 | | | |
| Brown: | | 6–3 | | | |
| Total: | | 6–3 | | | |
