= 1893 Geneva Covenanters football team =

American college football season

1893 Geneva Covenanters football
- Conference: Independent
- Record: 2–2–1
- Head coach: William McCracken (4th season)
- Captain: C. A. Dodds

1893 Eastern college football independents records
	Conf.			Overall
Team	W	L	T	W		L		T
Princeton		–		11	–	0	–	0
Fordham		–		4	–	0	–	0
Harvard		–		12	–	1	–	0
Yale		–		10	–	1	–	0
Colgate		–		3	–	0	–	2
Penn		–		12	–	3	–	0
Penn State		–		4	–	1	–	0
Wesleyan		–		4	–	1	–	0
Holy Ghost		–		6	–	2	–	0
Swarthmore		–		6	–	2	–	1
Lehigh		–		7	–	3	–	0
Brown		–		6	–	3	–	0
Carlisle		–		2	–	1	–	0
Franklin & Marshall		–		4	–	2	–	1
Navy		–		5	–	3	–	0
Washington & Jefferson		–		5	–	3	–	0
Drexel		–		3	–	2	–	0
Bucknell		–		4	–	3	–	0
Amherst		–		7	–	6	–	1
Boston College		–		3	–	3	–	0
Geneva		–		2	–	2	–	1
Army		–		4	–	5	–	0
Williams		–		2	–	3	–	1
Tufts		–		4	–	7	–	0
Cornell		–		3	–	6	–	1
Worcester Tech		–		2	–	4	–	1
Boston University		–		1	–	2	–	0
Lafayette		–		3	–	6	–	0
Syracuse		–		4	–	9	–	1
Western Penn		–		1	–	4	–	0
MIT		–		1	–	5	–	0
Massachusetts		–		1	–	9	–	0
New Hampshire		–		0	–	1	–	0
Rutgers		–		0	–	4	–	0
Maine		–		0	–	5	–	0

The 1893 Geneva Covenanters football team was an American football team that represented Geneva College as an independent during the 1893 college football season. Led by fourth-year head coach William McCracken, Geneva compiled a record of 2–2–1. The team's captain was C. A. Dodds.

== Schedule ==
Date	Time	Opponent	Site	Result	Attendance	Source
October 14	2:45 p.m.	at Washington & Jefferson	College Park; Washington, PA	W 12–6		
October 21		at Pittsburgh Athletic Club	P. A. C. Park; Pittsburgh, PA	L 0–18		
November 18	2:30 p.m.	Washington & Jefferson	Beaver Falls, PA	W 28–10		
November 25		at Pittsburgh Athletic Club	P. A. C. Park; Pittsburgh, PA	L 4–26	400	
November 29		at Grove City	Grove City, PA	T 0–0		
