= 1893 Boston College football team =

American college football season

1893 Boston College football
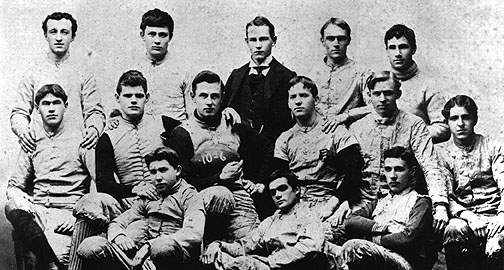
- Conference: Independent
- Record: 3–3
- Head coach: Joseph Drum (1st season)
- Captain: Bernie Waters
- Home stadium: South End Grounds

1893 Eastern college football independents records
	Conf.			Overall
Team	W	L	T	W		L		T
Princeton		–		11	–	0	–	0
Fordham		–		4	–	0	–	0
Harvard		–		12	–	1	–	0
Yale		–		10	–	1	–	0
Colgate		–		3	–	0	–	2
Penn		–		12	–	3	–	0
Penn State		–		4	–	1	–	0
Wesleyan		–		4	–	1	–	0
Holy Ghost		–		6	–	2	–	0
Swarthmore		–		6	–	2	–	1
Lehigh		–		7	–	3	–	0
Brown		–		6	–	3	–	0
Carlisle		–		2	–	1	–	0
Franklin & Marshall		–		4	–	2	–	1
Navy		–		5	–	3	–	0
Washington & Jefferson		–		5	–	3	–	0
Drexel		–		3	–	2	–	0
Bucknell		–		4	–	3	–	0
Amherst		–		7	–	6	–	1
Boston College		–		3	–	3	–	0
Geneva		–		2	–	2	–	1
Army		–		4	–	5	–	0
Williams		–		2	–	3	–	1
Tufts		–		4	–	7	–	0
Cornell		–		3	–	6	–	1
Worcester Tech		–		2	–	4	–	1
Boston University		–		1	–	2	–	0
Lafayette		–		3	–	6	–	0
Syracuse		–		4	–	9	–	1
Western Penn		–		1	–	4	–	0
MIT		–		1	–	5	–	0
Massachusetts		–		1	–	9	–	0
New Hampshire		–		0	–	1	–	0
Rutgers		–		0	–	4	–	0
Maine		–		0	–	5	–	0

The 1893 Boston College football team was an American football team that represented Boston College as an independent during the 1893 college football season. Led by Joseph Drum in his first and only season as head coach, Boston College compiled a record of 3–3.

== Schedule ==
Date	Opponent	Site	Result	Source
October 20	at St. John's Literary Institute		W 4–0	
October 26	at MIT freshmen		L 0–6	
October 27	at Somerville High School		W 10–6	
November 1	at Newton High School	Newton, MA	L 0–10	
November 18	at West Roxbury High School		L 0–6	
November 23	Boston University	South End Grounds; Boston, MA (rivalry)	W 10–6	
