= Joseph Drum =

American football player and coach (1874–1926)

Biographical details
- Born: May 1, 1874; Fort McKavett, Texas, U.S.
- Died: March 14, 1926 (aged 51); New York, New York, U.S.
- Education: Boston College (1894); Georgetown University

Playing career
- 1893: Boston College
- Position: Quarterback

Coaching career (HC unless noted)
- 1893: Boston College

Head coaching record
- Overall: 3–3

Joseph C. Drum (May 1, 1874 – March 14, 1926) was an American college football player and coach. He served as the first head football coach at Boston College. He, along with future Congressman Joseph F. O'Connell, were the founders of BC football team in 1892. When the team began play in 1893, Drum was named the team's head coach, then an unpaid position. Drum was also the team's first quarterback. On October 26, 1893, he scored BC's first ever touchdown on a fumble recovery. It was the only score in BC's 4–0 victory over Saint John's Literary Institute. He died of pneumonia in 1926.

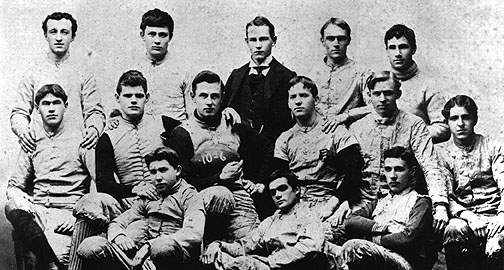
Boston College football team, 1893

== Head coaching record ==
Year	Team	Overall	Conference	Standing	Bowl/playoffs
Boston College (Independent) (1893)
1893	Boston College	3–3			
Boston College:		3–3			
Total:		3–3			
