= Harmon S. Graves =

American football player, coach, and lawyer (1870–1940)

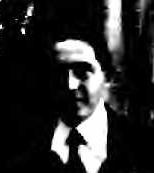

Biographical details
- Born: October 4, 1870; Cambridge, New York, U.S.
- Died: September 13, 1940 (aged 69); Grand Isle, Vermont, U.S.

Playing career
- 1889: Yale
- 1891–1892: Yale
- Position: Halfback

Coaching career (HC unless noted)
- 1893: Lehigh
- 1894–1895: Army
- 1895: Pittsburgh Athletic Club

Head coaching record
- Overall: 15–7 (college)

Harmon Sheldon Graves (October 4, 1870 – September 13, 1940) was an American college football player, coach, and lawyer. He served as the head football coach at Lehigh University in 1893 and the United States Military Academy from 1894 to 1895, compiling a career head coaching record of 15–7. He coached the Pittsburgh Athletic Club football team late in the 1895 season. Graves played football as a halfback at Yale University. He later practiced law in New York City.

== Head coaching record ==
=== College ===
Year	Team	Overall	Conference	Standing	Bowl/playoffs
Lehigh (Independent) (1893)
1893	Lehigh	7–3			
Lehigh:		7–3			
Army Cadets (Independent) (1894–1895)
1894	Army	3–2			
1895	Army	5–2			
Army:		10–4			
Total:		15–7			
