= 1893 Holy Ghost College football team =

American college football season

1893 Holy Ghost College football
- Conference: Independent
- Record: 6–2
- Head coach: Fr. McDermott (1st season)
- Home stadium: Marion Station

1893 Eastern college football independents records
| | Conf. | | | Overall |
| Team | W | L | T | W | | L | | T |
|---|---|---|---|---|---|---|---|---|
| Princeton | | – | | 11 | – | 0 | – | 0 |
| Fordham | | – | | 4 | – | 0 | – | 0 |
| Harvard | | – | | 12 | – | 1 | – | 0 |
| Yale | | – | | 10 | – | 1 | – | 0 |
| Colgate | | – | | 3 | – | 0 | – | 2 |
| Penn | | – | | 12 | – | 3 | – | 0 |
| Penn State | | – | | 4 | – | 1 | – | 0 |
| Wesleyan | | – | | 4 | – | 1 | – | 0 |
| Holy Ghost | | – | | 6 | – | 2 | – | 0 |
| Swarthmore | | – | | 6 | – | 2 | – | 1 |
| Lehigh | | – | | 7 | – | 3 | – | 0 |
| Brown | | – | | 6 | – | 3 | – | 0 |
| Carlisle | | – | | 2 | – | 1 | – | 0 |
| Franklin & Marshall | | – | | 4 | – | 2 | – | 1 |
| Navy | | – | | 5 | – | 3 | – | 0 |
| Washington & Jefferson | | – | | 5 | – | 3 | – | 0 |
| Drexel | | – | | 3 | – | 2 | – | 0 |
| Bucknell | | – | | 4 | – | 3 | – | 0 |
| Amherst | | – | | 7 | – | 6 | – | 1 |
| Boston College | | – | | 3 | – | 3 | – | 0 |
| Geneva | | – | | 2 | – | 2 | – | 1 |
| Army | | – | | 4 | – | 5 | – | 0 |
| Williams | | – | | 2 | – | 3 | – | 1 |
| Tufts | | – | | 4 | – | 7 | – | 0 |
| Cornell | | – | | 3 | – | 6 | – | 1 |
| Worcester Tech | | – | | 2 | – | 4 | – | 1 |
| Boston University | | – | | 1 | – | 2 | – | 0 |
| Lafayette | | – | | 3 | – | 6 | – | 0 |
| Syracuse | | – | | 4 | – | 9 | – | 1 |
| Western Penn | | – | | 1 | – | 4 | – | 0 |
| MIT | | – | | 1 | – | 5 | – | 0 |
| Massachusetts | | – | | 1 | – | 9 | – | 0 |
| New Hampshire | | – | | 0 | – | 1 | – | 0 |
| Rutgers | | – | | 0 | – | 4 | – | 0 |
| Maine | | – | | 0 | – | 5 | – | 0 |

The 1893 Holy Ghost College football team was an American football team that represented Pittsburgh Catholic College of the Holy Ghost—now known as Duquesne University—during the 1893 college football season. The team finished the season with a record of 6–2. Father McDermott was the team's coach. The team played its home games at Marion Station in the Hazelwood section of Pittsburgh.

== Schedule ==
| Date | Opponent | Site | Result | Source |
|---|---|---|---|---|
| October 6 | Hazelwood | Marion Station; Pittsburgh, PA | W 18–0 | |
| October 14 | Nonpareil Athletic Club | Marion Station; Pittsburgh, PA | W 38–0 | |
| October 20 | Hazelwood | Marion Station; Pittsburgh, PA | W 18–0 | |
| October 28 | at Oakmont | Edgewater Park; Oakmont, PA | W 44–0 | |
| November 4 | at Pittsburgh Athletic Club | PAC Park; Pittsburgh, PA | L 0–18 or 0–20 | |
| November 11 | at Washington & Jefferson | College Park; Washington, PA | L 10–22 | |
| November 25 | South Side Athletic Club | Marion Station; Pittsburgh, PA | W 28–0 | |
| November 30 | at Connellsville YMCA | Connellsville, PA | W 34–0 | |
