= 1893 Army Cadets football team =

American college football season

1893 Army Cadets football
- Conference: Independent
- Record: 4–5
- Head coach: Laurie Bliss (1st season)
- Captain: Thomas Gillespie Carson
- Home stadium: The Plain

1893 Eastern college football independents records
	Conf.			Overall
Team	W	L	T	W		L		T
Princeton		–		11	–	0	–	0
Fordham		–		4	–	0	–	0
Harvard		–		12	–	1	–	0
Yale		–		10	–	1	–	0
Colgate		–		3	–	0	–	2
Penn		–		12	–	3	–	0
Penn State		–		4	–	1	–	0
Wesleyan		–		4	–	1	–	0
Holy Ghost		–		6	–	2	–	0
Swarthmore		–		6	–	2	–	1
Lehigh		–		7	–	3	–	0
Brown		–		6	–	3	–	0
Carlisle		–		2	–	1	–	0
Franklin & Marshall		–		4	–	2	–	1
Navy		–		5	–	3	–	0
Washington & Jefferson		–		5	–	3	–	0
Drexel		–		3	–	2	–	0
Bucknell		–		4	–	3	–	0
Boston College		–		3	–	3	–	0
Geneva		–		2	–	2	–	1
Army		–		4	–	5	–	0
Tufts		–		4	–	7	–	0
Cornell		–		3	–	6	–	1
Worcester Tech		–		2	–	4	–	1
Boston University		–		1	–	2	–	0
Lafayette		–		3	–	6	–	0
Syracuse		–		4	–	9	–	1
Western Penn		–		1	–	4	–	0
MIT		–		1	–	5	–	0
Massachusetts		–		1	–	9	–	0
New Hampshire		–		0	–	1	–	0
Rutgers		–		0	–	4	–	0
Maine		–		0	–	5	–	0

The 1893 Army Cadets football team represented the United States Military Academy as an independent during the 1893 college football season. In their first and only season under head coach Laurie Bliss, the Cadets compiled a 4–5 record and were outscored by their opponents by a combined total of 109 to 84. In the annual Army–Navy Game, the Cadets lost to the Midshipmen by a 6 to 4 score.

No Army Cadets were honored on the 1893 College Football All-America Team.

== Schedule ==
Date	Time	Opponent	Site	Result	Attendance	Source
September 30		Volunteer AC	The Plain; West Point, NY	L 4–6		
October 7	3:30 p.m.	Lafayette	The Plain; West Point, NY	W 36–0	1,200	
October 14		Lehigh	The Plain; West Point, NY	L 0–18		
October 21	3:30 p.m.	Amherst	The Plain; West Point, NY	W 12–4	2,000	
October 28		Yale	The Plain; West Point, NY	L 0–28		
November 4		Union (NY)	The Plain; West Point, NY	W 6–0		
November 11		Trinity (CT)	The Plain; West Point, NY	W 18–11		
November 18		Princeton	The Plain; West Point, NY	L 4–36		
December 2		at Navy	Worden Field; Annapolis, MD (Army–Navy Game)	L 4–6		

== Players ==
The following Cadets were members of the 1893 Army football team.

- Thales Lucius Ames, Wisconsin - center
- Dwight Edward Aultman, Pennsylvania - right tackle (USS General D. E. Aultman (AP-156) named in his honor)
- John Somerville Battle, North Carolina - left tackle
- A. P. Berry
- W. J. Borden
- Jens Bugge, Jr., Minnesota
- Reynolds Johnson Burt, Ohio
- Thomas Gillespie Carson, Illinois - fullback
- William Durward Connor, Iowa
- Samuel George Creden, Massachusetts - backup quarterback
- Samuel Field Dallam, Pennsylvania
- Chase Doster, Kansas
- Ralph Willard Drury, Massachusetts
- Daniel Duncan, Kentucky - backup left halfback
- James Paxton Harbeson, Kentucky - right end
- James Villard Heidt, Georgia
- James William Hinkley, Jr., New York - quarterback
- Franklin Swart Hutton, New York
- Edward Leonard King, Massachusetts
- Abraham Grant Lott, Kansas - left guard
- Willard Herman McCornack, Illinois
- Dennis E. Nolan, New York - left end
- Paul Reisinger, Pennsylvania
- Otho B. Rosenbaum, Virginia
- George Henry Shelton, Connecticut - left halfback
- Fine Wilson Smith, Kentucky - right guard
- Lucian Stacey, Maine - right halfback
- David Sheridan Stanley
- Harry Howard Stout, Pennsylvania
- W. A. White
- Clarence Charles Williams, Georgia
