= 1893 Bucknell football team =

American college football season

1893 Bucknell football
- Conference: Independent
- Record: 4–3
- Head coach: Will Young (1st season)
- Captain: Harvey Smith

1893 Eastern college football independents records
	Conf.			Overall
Team	W	L	T	W		L		T
Princeton		–		11	–	0	–	0
Fordham		–		4	–	0	–	0
Harvard		–		12	–	1	–	0
Yale		–		10	–	1	–	0
Colgate		–		3	–	0	–	2
Penn		–		12	–	3	–	0
Penn State		–		4	–	1	–	0
Wesleyan		–		4	–	1	–	0
Holy Ghost		–		6	–	2	–	0
Swarthmore		–		6	–	2	–	1
Lehigh		–		7	–	3	–	0
Brown		–		6	–	3	–	0
Carlisle		–		2	–	1	–	0
Franklin & Marshall		–		4	–	2	–	1
Navy		–		5	–	3	–	0
Washington & Jefferson		–		5	–	3	–	0
Drexel		–		3	–	2	–	0
Bucknell		–		4	–	3	–	0
Amherst		–		7	–	6	–	1
Boston College		–		3	–	3	–	0
Geneva		–		2	–	2	–	1
Army		–		4	–	5	–	0
Williams		–		2	–	3	–	1
Tufts		–		4	–	7	–	0
Cornell		–		3	–	6	–	1
Worcester Tech		–		2	–	4	–	1
Boston University		–		1	–	2	–	0
Lafayette		–		3	–	6	–	0
Syracuse		–		4	–	9	–	1
Western Penn		–		1	–	4	–	0
MIT		–		1	–	5	–	0
Massachusetts		–		1	–	9	–	0
New Hampshire		–		0	–	1	–	0
Rutgers		–		0	–	4	–	0
Maine		–		0	–	5	–	0

The 1893 Bucknell football team was an American football team that represented Bucknell University as an independent during the 1893 college football season. Led by first-year head coach Will Young, Bucknell compiled a record of 4–3. Harvey Smith was the team captain. A native of Williamsport, Pennsylvania, Young graduated from Cornell University in 1893.

== Schedule ==
Date	Time	Opponent	Site	Result	Attendance	Source
September 30		at Shamokin	Shamokin, PA	W 10–6		
October 7	3:30 p.m.	at Franklin & Marshall	McGrann's Park; Lancaster, PA	L 6–10	1,500	
October 21	10:30 a.m.	Gettysburg	Bucknell campus; Lewisburg, PA	W 23–0		
November 1		at Swarthmore	Swarthmore, PA	L 0–36		
November 3		at Haverford	Haverford, PA	W 26–0		
November 11	2:30 p.m.	Penn State	Bucknell campus; Lewisburg, PA	L 18–36	2,000	
November 30	2:30 p.m.	vs. Dickinson	Island Park; Harrisburg, PA	W 20–12	3,000–3,500	
