= W. G. Thompson =

American educator, university administrator, and football coach

Biographical details
- Born: August 15, 1865; Albany, New York, U.S.
- Died: March 30, 1940 (aged 74); New York, New York, U.S.

Coaching career (HC unless noted)

Football
- 1893: Carlisle

Head coaching record
- Overall: 2–1

William Grant Thompson (August 15, 1965 – March 30, 1940) was an American educator, university administrator, and college football coach. He served for 15 years as the executive director of the Carlisle Indian Industrial School, school disciplinarian, and an instructor of business. He was also the school's first head football coach in 1893 and led the Indians to a 2–1 record. Thompson also coached the Carlisle baseball, basketball, and track teams for five years. From 1897 to 1907, he was in "practical charge of the athletics" at the school. In 1907, he left Carlisle to teach at Reading High School for three years.

Thompson was born in Albany, New York, where he attended local schools. He was a cadet at the United States Military Academy in 1885–86, but resigned after one year. He subsequently graduated from Chautauqua Normal School of Physical Education and New York University (NYU). Following an illness lasting several months, Thompson died on March 30, 1940, at the Knickerbocker Hospital in New York City.

== Head coaching record ==
Year	Team	Overall	Conference	Standing	Bowl/playoffs
Carlisle Indians (Independent) (1893)
1893	Carlisle	2–1			
Carlisle:		2–1			
Total:		2–1			
