= 1893 Cornell Big Red football team =

American college football season

1893 Cornell Big Red football
- Conference: Independent
- Record: 3–5–1
- Head coach: Carl Johanson (2nd season)
- Captain: Charles J. Barr
- Home stadium: Percy Field

1893 Eastern college football independents records
	Conf.			Overall
Team	W	L	T	W		L		T
Princeton		–		11	–	0	–	0
Fordham		–		4	–	0	–	0
Harvard		–		12	–	1	–	0
Yale		–		10	–	1	–	0
Colgate		–		3	–	0	–	2
Penn		–		12	–	3	–	0
Penn State		–		4	–	1	–	0
Wesleyan		–		4	–	1	–	0
Holy Ghost		–		6	–	2	–	0
Swarthmore		–		6	–	2	–	1
Lehigh		–		7	–	3	–	0
Brown		–		6	–	3	–	0
Carlisle		–		2	–	1	–	0
Franklin & Marshall		–		4	–	2	–	1
Navy		–		5	–	3	–	0
Washington & Jefferson		–		5	–	3	–	0
Drexel		–		3	–	2	–	0
Bucknell		–		4	–	3	–	0
Amherst		–		7	–	6	–	1
Boston College		–		3	–	3	–	0
Geneva		–		2	–	2	–	1
Army		–		4	–	5	–	0
Williams		–		2	–	3	–	1
Tufts		–		4	–	7	–	0
Cornell		–		3	–	6	–	1
Worcester Tech		–		2	–	4	–	1
Boston University		–		1	–	2	–	0
Lafayette		–		3	–	6	–	0
Syracuse		–		4	–	9	–	1
Western Penn		–		1	–	4	–	0
MIT		–		1	–	5	–	0
Massachusetts		–		1	–	9	–	0
New Hampshire		–		0	–	1	–	0
Rutgers		–		0	–	4	–	0
Maine		–		0	–	5	–	0

The 1893 Cornell Big Red football team was an American football team that represented Cornell University during the 1893 college football season. The team compiled a 3–5–1 record.

== Schedule ==
Date	Time	Opponent	Site	Result	Attendance	Source
September 27		Syracuse	Percy Field; Ithaca, NY	W 50–0		
September 30	3:00 p.m.	Gettysburg	Percy Field; Ithaca, NY	W 16–0		
October 14		Union (NY)	Ithaca, NY	W 18–6		
October 21	2:00 p.m.	vs. Princeton	Manhattan Field; New York, NY	L 0–46		
October 25		Tufts	Ithaca, NY	L 0–6		
October 28		vs. Williams	Ridgefield grounds; Albany, NY	T 10–10	2,000	
November 4		vs. Harvard	Manhattan Field; New York, NY	L 0–34	1,200	
November 11		Lehigh	Ithaca, NY	L 0–14		
November 18		at Penn	Germantown Cricket Club; Philadelphia, PA (rivalry)	L 0–50	6,000	
