= 1893 Worcester Tech football team =

American college football season

1893 Worcester Tech football
- Conference: Independent
- Record: 2–4–1
- Head coach: None
- Home stadium: Worcester Oval

1893 Eastern college football independents records
	Conf.			Overall
Team	W	L	T	W		L		T
Princeton		–		11	–	0	–	0
Fordham		–		4	–	0	–	0
Harvard		–		12	–	1	–	0
Yale		–		10	–	1	–	0
Colgate		–		3	–	0	–	2
Penn		–		12	–	3	–	0
Penn State		–		4	–	1	–	0
Wesleyan		–		4	–	1	–	0
Holy Ghost		–		6	–	2	–	0
Swarthmore		–		6	–	2	–	1
Lehigh		–		7	–	3	–	0
Brown		–		6	–	3	–	0
Carlisle		–		2	–	1	–	0
Franklin & Marshall		–		4	–	2	–	1
Navy		–		5	–	3	–	0
Washington & Jefferson		–		5	–	3	–	0
Drexel		–		3	–	2	–	0
Bucknell		–		4	–	3	–	0
Amherst		–		7	–	6	–	1
Boston College		–		3	–	3	–	0
Geneva		–		2	–	2	–	1
Army		–		4	–	5	–	0
Williams		–		2	–	3	–	1
Tufts		–		4	–	7	–	0
Cornell		–		3	–	6	–	1
Worcester Tech		–		2	–	4	–	1
Boston University		–		1	–	2	–	0
Lafayette		–		3	–	6	–	0
Syracuse		–		4	–	9	–	1
Western Penn		–		1	–	4	–	0
MIT		–		1	–	5	–	0
Massachusetts		–		1	–	9	–	0
New Hampshire		–		0	–	1	–	0
Rutgers		–		0	–	4	–	0
Maine		–		0	–	5	–	0

The 1893 Worcester Tech football team represented Worcester Polytechnic Institute as an independent during the 1893 college football season. Worcester Tech compiled a record of 2–4–1.

== Schedule ==
Date	Opponent	Site	Result	Attendance	Source
September 23	at Trinity (CT)	Worcester Oval; Worcester, MA	T 16–16		
September 30	Massachusetts	Worcester, MA	W 16–0		
October 7	Brown	Worcester, MA	L 0–30		
October 11	at Williams	Weston Field; Williamstown, MA	L 0–66		
October 21	Boston Tech	Worcester Oval; Worcester, MA	L 0–40		
October 30	at Amherst	Amherst, MA	L 4–34		
November 4	Trinity (CT)	Hartford, CT	W 0–10	150	
