= 1893 Rutgers Queensmen football team =

American college football season

1893 Rutgers Queensmen football
- Conference: Independent
- Record: 0–4
- Head coach: None
- Captains: Chalmers P. Van Dyke; Gabe Ludlow; George Ludlow
- Home stadium: Neilson Field

1893 Eastern college football independents records
	Conf.			Overall
Team	W	L	T	W		L		T
Princeton		–		11	–	0	–	0
Fordham		–		4	–	0	–	0
Harvard		–		12	–	1	–	0
Yale		–		10	–	1	–	0
Colgate		–		3	–	0	–	2
Penn		–		12	–	3	–	0
Penn State		–		4	–	1	–	0
Wesleyan		–		4	–	1	–	0
Holy Ghost		–		6	–	2	–	0
Swarthmore		–		6	–	2	–	1
Lehigh		–		7	–	3	–	0
Brown		–		6	–	3	–	0
Carlisle		–		2	–	1	–	0
Franklin & Marshall		–		4	–	2	–	1
Navy		–		5	–	3	–	0
Washington & Jefferson		–		5	–	3	–	0
Drexel		–		3	–	2	–	0
Bucknell		–		4	–	3	–	0
Amherst		–		7	–	6	–	1
Boston College		–		3	–	3	–	0
Geneva		–		2	–	2	–	1
Army		–		4	–	5	–	0
Williams		–		2	–	3	–	1
Tufts		–		4	–	7	–	0
Cornell		–		3	–	6	–	1
Worcester Tech		–		2	–	4	–	1
Boston University		–		1	–	2	–	0
Lafayette		–		3	–	6	–	0
Syracuse		–		4	–	9	–	1
Western Penn		–		1	–	4	–	0
MIT		–		1	–	5	–	0
Massachusetts		–		1	–	9	–	0
New Hampshire		–		0	–	1	–	0
Rutgers		–		0	–	4	–	0
Maine		–		0	–	5	–	0

The 1893 Rutgers Queensmen football team represented Rutgers University as an independent during the 1893 college football season. The Queensmen compiled a 0–4 record and were outscored by their opponents 88 to 8. The team had no coach, and its captains were Chalmers P. Van Dyke, Gabe Ludlow, and George Ludlow.

== Schedule ==
Date	Opponent	Site	Result	Source
October 14	at New York Athletic Club	Manhattan Field; New York, NY	L 0–14	
October 21	Stevens	Neilson Field; New Brunswick, NJ	L 8–39	
October 28	at Orange Athletic Club	Orange Oval; East Orange, NJ	L 0–22	
November 11	at Lafayette		L 0–1	
