= 1893 Brown Bears football team =

American college football season

1893 Brown Bears football
- Conference: Independent
- Record: 6–3
- Head coach: William Odlin (1st season)
- Captain: W. B. Hopkins
- Home stadium: Lincoln Field

1893 Eastern college football independents records
	Conf.			Overall
Team	W	L	T	W		L		T
Princeton		–		11	–	0	–	0
Fordham		–		4	–	0	–	0
Harvard		–		12	–	1	–	0
Yale		–		10	–	1	–	0
Colgate		–		3	–	0	–	2
Penn		–		12	–	3	–	0
Penn State		–		4	–	1	–	0
Wesleyan		–		4	–	1	–	0
Holy Ghost		–		6	–	2	–	0
Swarthmore		–		6	–	2	–	1
Lehigh		–		7	–	3	–	0
Brown		–		6	–	3	–	0
Carlisle		–		2	–	1	–	0
Franklin & Marshall		–		4	–	2	–	1
Navy		–		5	–	3	–	0
Washington & Jefferson		–		5	–	3	–	0
Drexel		–		3	–	2	–	0
Bucknell		–		4	–	3	–	0
Amherst		–		7	–	6	–	1
Boston College		–		3	–	3	–	0
Geneva		–		2	–	2	–	1
Army		–		4	–	5	–	0
Williams		–		2	–	3	–	1
Tufts		–		4	–	7	–	0
Cornell		–		3	–	6	–	1
Worcester Tech		–		2	–	4	–	1
Boston University		–		1	–	2	–	0
Lafayette		–		3	–	6	–	0
Syracuse		–		4	–	9	–	1
Western Penn		–		1	–	4	–	0
MIT		–		1	–	5	–	0
Massachusetts		–		1	–	9	–	0
New Hampshire		–		0	–	1	–	0
Rutgers		–		0	–	4	–	0
Maine		–		0	–	5	–	0

The 1893 Brown Bears football team represented Brown University as an independent in the 1893 college football season. Led by William Odlin in his first and only season as head coach, Brown compiled a record of 6–3.

== Schedule ==
Date	Time	Opponent	Site	Result	Attendance	Source
October 4		at Yale	Yale Field; New Haven, CT	L 0–18		
October 7		at Worcester Tech	Worcester, MA	W 30–0		
October 14		Boston Athletic Association	Lincoln Field; Providence, RI	L 0–6	1,300	
October 21		Trinity (CT)	Lincoln Field; Providence, RI	W 34–0	1,000	
October 25		at Phillips Academy	Andover, MA	W 10–0	900	
October 28	3:00 p.m.	at Harvard	Jarvis Field; Cambridge, MA	L 0–58	2,500	
November 8		Boston Tech	Lincoln Field; Providence, RI	W 36–0	1,200	
November 18		at Boston Tech	South End Grounds; Boston, MA	W 28–6	400	
November 23		Tufts	Lincoln Field; Providence, RI	W 30–0	1,400	
