= 1893 Lehigh football team =

American college football season

1893 Lehigh football
- Conference: Independent
- Record: 7–3
- Head coach: Harmon S. Graves (1st season)

1893 Eastern college football independents records
	Conf.			Overall
Team	W	L	T	W		L		T
Princeton		–		11	–	0	–	0
Fordham		–		4	–	0	–	0
Harvard		–		12	–	1	–	0
Yale		–		10	–	1	–	0
Colgate		–		3	–	0	–	2
Penn		–		12	–	3	–	0
Penn State		–		4	–	1	–	0
Wesleyan		–		4	–	1	–	0
Holy Ghost		–		6	–	2	–	0
Swarthmore		–		6	–	2	–	1
Lehigh		–		7	–	3	–	0
Brown		–		6	–	3	–	0
Carlisle		–		2	–	1	–	0
Franklin & Marshall		–		4	–	2	–	1
Navy		–		5	–	3	–	0
Washington & Jefferson		–		5	–	3	–	0
Drexel		–		3	–	2	–	0
Bucknell		–		4	–	3	–	0
Amherst		–		7	–	6	–	1
Boston College		–		3	–	3	–	0
Geneva		–		2	–	2	–	1
Army		–		4	–	5	–	0
Williams		–		2	–	3	–	1
Tufts		–		4	–	7	–	0
Cornell		–		3	–	6	–	1
Worcester Tech		–		2	–	4	–	1
Boston University		–		1	–	2	–	0
Lafayette		–		3	–	6	–	0
Syracuse		–		4	–	9	–	1
Western Penn		–		1	–	4	–	0
MIT		–		1	–	5	–	0
Massachusetts		–		1	–	9	–	0
New Hampshire		–		0	–	1	–	0
Rutgers		–		0	–	4	–	0
Maine		–		0	–	5	–	0

The 1893 Lehigh football team was an American football team that represented Lehigh University as an independent during the 1893 college football season. In its first and only season under head coach Harmon S. Graves, the team compiled a 7–3 record and outscored opponents by a total of 174 to 84.

== Schedule ==
Date	Time	Opponent	Site	Result	Attendance	Source
September 30	3:30 p.m.	Dickinson	Bethlehem, PA	W 52–0	600	
October 7		Princeton	Bethlehem, PA	L 0–12		
October 14		at Army	The Plain; West Point, NY	W 18–0		
October 18		Penn	Bethlehem, PA	L 6–32	2,000	
October 25		at Princeton	Princeton, NJ	L 6–28		
October 28		at Navy	Worden Field; Annapolis, MD	W 12–6		
November 8		Lafayette	Bethlehem, PA (rivalry)	W 22–6		
November 11		at Cornell	Ithaca, NY	W 14–0		
November 18		at Lafayette	Easton, PA	W 10–0		
November 25		vs. North Carolina	Manhattan Field; New York, NY	W 34–0		
