= 1893 Yale Bulldogs football team =

American college football season

1893 Yale Bulldogs football

National champion (Davis)
- Conference: Independent
- Record: 10–1
- Head coach: William Rhodes (1st season)
- Captain: Frank Hinkey
- Home stadium: Yale Field

1893 Eastern college football independents records
	Conf.			Overall
Team	W	L	T	W		L		T
Princeton		–		11	–	0	–	0
Fordham		–		4	–	0	–	0
Harvard		–		12	–	1	–	0
Yale		–		10	–	1	–	0
Colgate		–		3	–	0	–	2
Penn		–		12	–	3	–	0
Penn State		–		4	–	1	–	0
Wesleyan		–		4	–	1	–	0
Holy Ghost		–		6	–	2	–	0
Swarthmore		–		6	–	2	–	1
Lehigh		–		7	–	3	–	0
Brown		–		6	–	3	–	0
Carlisle		–		2	–	1	–	0
Franklin & Marshall		–		4	–	2	–	1
Navy		–		5	–	3	–	0
Washington & Jefferson		–		5	–	3	–	0
Drexel		–		3	–	2	–	0
Bucknell		–		4	–	3	–	0
Boston College		–		3	–	3	–	0
Geneva		–		2	–	2	–	1
Army		–		4	–	5	–	0
Tufts		–		4	–	7	–	0
Cornell		–		3	–	6	–	1
Worcester Tech		–		2	–	4	–	1
Boston University		–		1	–	2	–	0
Lafayette		–		3	–	6	–	0
Syracuse		–		4	–	9	–	1
Western Penn		–		1	–	4	–	0
MIT		–		1	–	5	–	0
Massachusetts		–		1	–	9	–	0
New Hampshire		–		0	–	1	–	0
Rutgers		–		0	–	4	–	0
Maine		–		0	–	5	–	0

The 1893 Yale Bulldogs football team represented Yale University in the 1893 college football season. The team finished with a 10–1 record and, despite losing to Princeton, was retroactively named as the national champion by one selector, Parke H. Davis. Yale's 1893 season was part of a 37-game winning streak that began with the final game of the 1890 season and stopped at the end of the 1893 season.

== Schedule ==
Date	Time	Opponent	Site	Result	Attendance	Source
October 4		Brown	Yale Field; New Haven, CT	W 18–0		
October 7		at Crescent Athletic Club	Eastern Park; Brooklyn, NY	W 16–0	2,000	
October 14		Dartmouth	Yale Field; New Haven, CT	W 28–0	800–1,200	
October 18	3:10 p.m.	Amherst	Yale Field; New Haven, CT	W 52–0	700	
October 21		at Orange Athletic Club	Orange Oval; East Orange, NJ	W 50–0	2,000	
October 25		Williams	Yale Field; New Haven, CT	W 82–0	1,500	
October 28		at Army	The Plain; West Point, NY	W 28–0		
November 7		at New York Athletic Club	Polo Grounds; New York, NY	W 42–0		
November 11		vs. Penn	Polo Grounds; New York, NY	W 14–6		
November 25		vs. Harvard	Hampden Park; Springfield, MA (rivalry)	W 6–0		
November 30		vs. Princeton	Polo Grounds; New York, NY (rivalry)	L 0–6		

== Roster ==
- George Adee, QB
- Bill Armstrong, HB
- Anson M. Beard, C
- G. Brooke
- J. M. Brown, T
- Frank Butterworth, FB
- Henry G. Campbell
- Charles Chadwick, T
- Thomas Cochran, E
- Edward V. Cox
- Harry P. Cross, C
- W. Redmond Cross
- Clarence DeWitt
- Thomas Dyer
- Theodore Eaton, HB
- John Campbell Greenway, E
- J. S. Hall, HB
- Edward H. Hart, HB
- F. S. Henry, QB
- Bill Hickok, G
- Louis Hinckey
- Frank Hinkey, E
- Harry C. Holcomb, T
- R. C. James
- Charles O. Jenkins, T
- Alexander Jerrems, HB
- S. A. Judd
- John M. Longacre
- David B. Lyman, Jr.
- James McCrea, G
- Eugene Messler, T
- Charles S. Morris, QB
- Fred T. Murphy, T
- William M. Richards, HB
- Phillip Stillman, C
- C. B. Sturgis
- Sam Thorne, FB
- Ralph B. Treadway, T
- David C. Twichell
- C. C. Walbridge
