= 1893 Princeton Tigers football team =

American college football season

1893 Princeton Tigers football
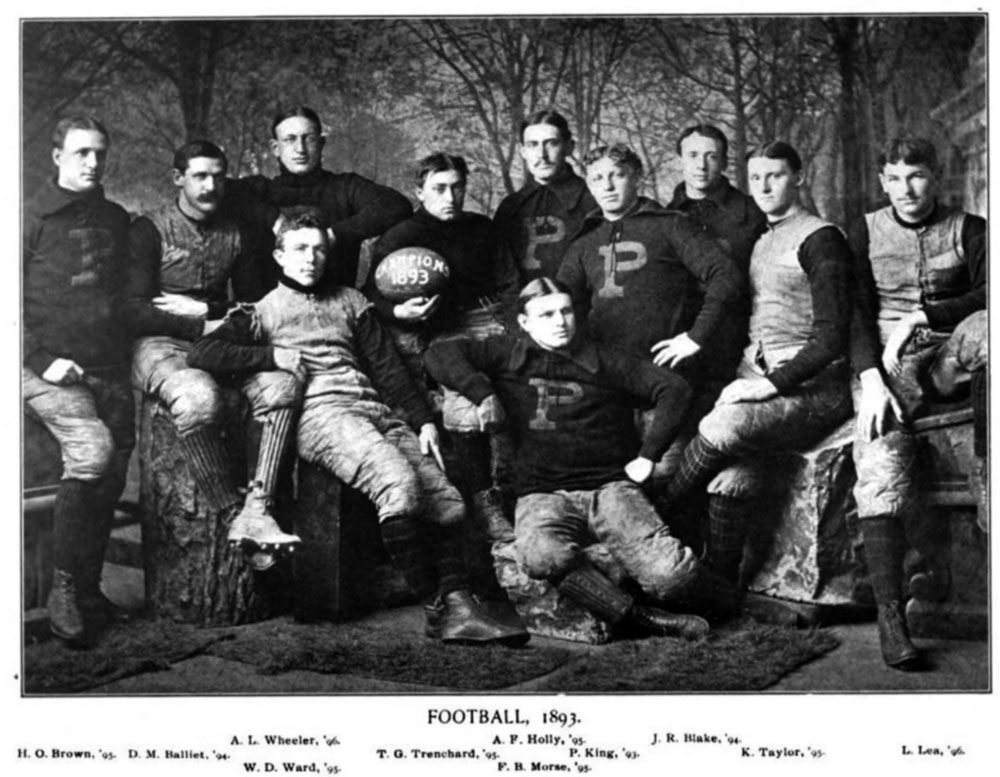

National champion (Billingsley, Helms, Houlgate, NCF)
- Conference: Independent
- Record: 11–0
- Head coach: None
- Captain: Thomas Trenchard

1893 Eastern college football independents records
	Conf.			Overall
Team	W	L	T	W		L		T
Princeton		–		11	–	0	–	0
Fordham		–		4	–	0	–	0
Harvard		–		12	–	1	–	0
Yale		–		10	–	1	–	0
Colgate		–		3	–	0	–	2
Penn		–		12	–	3	–	0
Penn State		–		4	–	1	–	0
Wesleyan		–		4	–	1	–	0
Holy Ghost		–		6	–	2	–	0
Swarthmore		–		6	–	2	–	1
Lehigh		–		7	–	3	–	0
Brown		–		6	–	3	–	0
Carlisle		–		2	–	1	–	0
Franklin & Marshall		–		4	–	2	–	1
Navy		–		5	–	3	–	0
Washington & Jefferson		–		5	–	3	–	0
Drexel		–		3	–	2	–	0
Bucknell		–		4	–	3	–	0
Boston College		–		3	–	3	–	0
Geneva		–		2	–	2	–	1
Army		–		4	–	5	–	0
Tufts		–		4	–	7	–	0
Cornell		–		3	–	6	–	1
Worcester Tech		–		2	–	4	–	1
Boston University		–		1	–	2	–	0
Lafayette		–		3	–	6	–	0
Syracuse		–		4	–	9	–	1
Western Penn		–		1	–	4	–	0
MIT		–		1	–	5	–	0
Massachusetts		–		1	–	9	–	0
New Hampshire		–		0	–	1	–	0
Rutgers		–		0	–	4	–	0
Maine		–		0	–	5	–	0

The 1893 Princeton Tigers football team represented Princeton University in the 1893 college football season. The team finished with an 11–0 record and was retroactively named as the national champion by the Billingsley Report, Helms Athletic Foundation, Houlgate System, and National Championship Foundation. They outscored their opponents 270 to 14.

As the Princeton and Yale teams prepared to meet in late November 1893, an unprecedented amount of media and public attention fell upon the big game, which was being billed as the championship game of the season. Both teams entered the game undefeated with records of 10–0. Yale had outscored its opponents 336–6 and was riding a 37-game winning streak dating back to a loss to Harvard in 1890. Princeton had outscored its opponents by a cumulative total of 264–14, and was seeking to avenge its 12–0 loss to Yale the previous year. A crowd of 40,000, the largest ever to see a football game up to that time, showed up at the Polo Grounds in New York to see the two teams take the field. Three-time consensus All-American Philip King led Princeton into the game. He would later head the Princeton Football Association and help coach. King had just developed the double wingback formation with the ends deployed on the wings of the line.

From the double wingback formation, Princeton precisely executed a complete set of plays and completely befuddled the Yale eleven, captained by College Football Hall of Famer Frank Hinkey. The New York Sun noted that "Princeton in 1893 had the finest offensive machine it had developed up to this time – a team with continuity of attack, the ability to pile first down upon first down." Princeton was able to cross the goal once and held Yale scoreless, thus winning 6-0 and claiming the national championship.

However, the game did not pass without engendering some controversy. The New York Herald declared in a scathing commentary: "Thanksgiving Day is no longer a solemn festival to God for mercies given. It is a holiday granted by the State and the Nation to see a game of football. The kicker now is king and the people bow down to him. The gory nosed tackler, hero of a hundred scrimmages and half as many wrecked wedges, is the idol of the hour. With swollen face and bleeding head, daubed from crown to sole with the mud of Manhattan Field, he stands triumphant amid the cheers of thousands. What matters that the purpose of the day is perverted, that church is foregone, that family reunion is neglected, that dinner is delayed if not forgot. Has not Princeton played a mighty game with Yale and has not Princeton won? This is the modern Thanksgiving Day."

The Yale-Princeton Thanksgiving Day game of 1893 earned $13,000 for each school from gate receipts, as the big games became the primary source of revenue for the college's athletic programs. Despite the loss, Yale was retroactively named champion by Parke H. Davis, and the NCAA Division I Football Records Book lists both Princeton and Yale as national champions.

== Schedule ==
Date	Time	Opponent	Site	Result	Attendance	Source
September 30	4:10 p.m.	Lafayette	University Field; Princeton, NJ	W 20–0	1,200–3,000	
October 4		at Lehigh	Bethlehem, PA	W 12–0		
October 14		at Crescent Athletic Club	Eastern Park; Brooklyn, NY	W 26–0	> 1,000	
October 18		Lawrenceville School	Princeton, NJ	W 8–4		
October 21	2:00 p.m.	vs. Cornell	Manhattan Field; New York, NY	W 46–0		
October 25		Lehigh	Princeton, NJ	W 28–6		
October 28		at Wesleyan	Middletown, CT	W 76–0		
November 4		at Penn	Germantown Cricket Club (rivalry)	W 4–0	18,000	
November 7		at Orange Athletic Club	Orange Oval; East Orange, NJ	W 8–0	3,500	
November 18		at Army	The Plain; West Point, NY	W 36–4		
November 30		vs. Yale	Polo Grounds; New York, NY (rivalry)	W 6–0		

== Roster ==
- Allen, FB
- D. M. Balliet, C
- Barnett, HB
- H. Brown, E
- Burt, FB
- Church, T
- Crowdis, C
- Dwight, QB
- Joseph Marshall Flint
- Fulper, HB
- Forrest M. Hall, G
- Augustus Holly, T
- Philip King, QB
- Langdon Lea
- William McCauley, E
- Franklin Morse
- Poe, QB
- Rhodes, G
- H. Riggs, T
- Rosengarten, HB
- Summers, G
- Taylor, T
- Thompson, E
- Thomas Trenchard, E
- Tyler, G
- Voorhees, HB
- William Ward, HB
- Art Wheeler, G
