= 1893 Drexel Dragons football team =

American college football season

1893 Drexel Dragons football
- Conference: Independent
- Record: 3–2
- Head coach: None
- Captain: Stuart Heist

1893 Eastern college football independents records
	Conf.			Overall
Team	W	L	T	W		L		T
Princeton		–		11	–	0	–	0
Fordham		–		4	–	0	–	0
Harvard		–		12	–	1	–	0
Yale		–		10	–	1	–	0
Colgate		–		3	–	0	–	2
Penn		–		12	–	3	–	0
Penn State		–		4	–	1	–	0
Wesleyan		–		4	–	1	–	0
Holy Ghost		–		6	–	2	–	0
Swarthmore		–		6	–	2	–	1
Lehigh		–		7	–	3	–	0
Brown		–		6	–	3	–	0
Carlisle		–		2	–	1	–	0
Franklin & Marshall		–		4	–	2	–	1
Navy		–		5	–	3	–	0
Washington & Jefferson		–		5	–	3	–	0
Drexel		–		3	–	2	–	0
Bucknell		–		4	–	3	–	0
Amherst		–		7	–	6	–	1
Boston College		–		3	–	3	–	0
Geneva		–		2	–	2	–	1
Army		–		4	–	5	–	0
Williams		–		2	–	3	–	1
Tufts		–		4	–	7	–	0
Cornell		–		3	–	6	–	1
Worcester Tech		–		2	–	4	–	1
Boston University		–		1	–	2	–	0
Lafayette		–		3	–	6	–	0
Syracuse		–		4	–	9	–	1
Western Penn		–		1	–	4	–	0
MIT		–		1	–	5	–	0
Massachusetts		–		1	–	9	–	0
New Hampshire		–		0	–	1	–	0
Rutgers		–		0	–	4	–	0
Maine		–		0	–	5	–	0

The 1893 Drexel Dragons football team represented the Drexel Institute of Technology (renamed Drexel University in 1970) as an independent during the 1893 college football season. The team did not have a head coach.

== Schedule ==
Date	Time	Opponent	Site	Result
November 7		at Hamilton School		W 8–0
November 18		Mt. Zion Institute		W 4–0
November 25		Rugby Academy		W Forfeit
November 30	10:30 pm	Bank Clerks' Association	Y.M.C.A; Philadelphia, PA	L 6–12
December 2		Northeast Manual Training School		L Forfeit
December 9		Central High School		Cancelled

== Roster ==
1893 Drexel Dragons football team roster
Players
Coaches
Offense

Pos.	#	Name	Class
TE		Jones
OT		Shaffer
G		Ryder
C, QB		Stuart Heist (C)
G		Colfesh
OT		Reeves
TE		Lewis
QB		Merrick
HB		Dessinger
HB		Brown
FB		Howell
TE		Anderson
OT		N.D. Holbrook
G		Krips
C		O.F. Knight
G		H.W. Lewis
OT		Gruel
TE		F.D. Lewis
HB		H.L. Cattanach
HB		Galbraith

Defense

Pos.	#	Name	Class

Special teams

Pos.	#	Name	Class

Head coach

- No coach

Coordinators/assistant coaches

Legend

- (C) Team captain
- (S) Suspended
- (I) Ineligible
- Injured
- Redshirt

Roster
Last update: 17 October 2018
