= 1893 Massachusetts Aggies football team =

American college football season

1893 Massachusetts Aggies football
- Conference: Independent
- Record: 1–9
- Head coach: None
- Home stadium: Alumni Field

1893 Eastern college football independents records
| | Conf. | | | Overall |
| Team | W | L | T | W | | L | | T |
|---|---|---|---|---|---|---|---|---|
| Princeton | | – | | 11 | – | 0 | – | 0 |
| Fordham | | – | | 4 | – | 0 | – | 0 |
| Harvard | | – | | 12 | – | 1 | – | 0 |
| Yale | | – | | 10 | – | 1 | – | 0 |
| Colgate | | – | | 3 | – | 0 | – | 2 |
| Penn | | – | | 12 | – | 3 | – | 0 |
| Penn State | | – | | 4 | – | 1 | – | 0 |
| Wesleyan | | – | | 4 | – | 1 | – | 0 |
| Holy Ghost | | – | | 6 | – | 2 | – | 0 |
| Swarthmore | | – | | 6 | – | 2 | – | 1 |
| Lehigh | | – | | 7 | – | 3 | – | 0 |
| Brown | | – | | 6 | – | 3 | – | 0 |
| Carlisle | | – | | 2 | – | 1 | – | 0 |
| Franklin & Marshall | | – | | 4 | – | 2 | – | 1 |
| Navy | | – | | 5 | – | 3 | – | 0 |
| Washington & Jefferson | | – | | 5 | – | 3 | – | 0 |
| Drexel | | – | | 3 | – | 2 | – | 0 |
| Bucknell | | – | | 4 | – | 3 | – | 0 |
| Amherst | | – | | 7 | – | 6 | – | 1 |
| Boston College | | – | | 3 | – | 3 | – | 0 |
| Geneva | | – | | 2 | – | 2 | – | 1 |
| Army | | – | | 4 | – | 5 | – | 0 |
| Williams | | – | | 2 | – | 3 | – | 1 |
| Tufts | | – | | 4 | – | 7 | – | 0 |
| Cornell | | – | | 3 | – | 6 | – | 1 |
| Worcester Tech | | – | | 2 | – | 4 | – | 1 |
| Boston University | | – | | 1 | – | 2 | – | 0 |
| Lafayette | | – | | 3 | – | 6 | – | 0 |
| Syracuse | | – | | 4 | – | 9 | – | 1 |
| Western Penn | | – | | 1 | – | 4 | – | 0 |
| MIT | | – | | 1 | – | 5 | – | 0 |
| Massachusetts | | – | | 1 | – | 9 | – | 0 |
| New Hampshire | | – | | 0 | – | 1 | – | 0 |
| Rutgers | | – | | 0 | – | 4 | – | 0 |
| Maine | | – | | 0 | – | 5 | – | 0 |

The 1893 Massachusetts Aggies football team represented Massachusetts Agricultural College in the 1893 college football season. The team played its home games at Alumni Field in Amherst, Massachusetts. Massachusetts finished the season with a record of 1–9.

== Schedule ==
| Date | Opponent | Site | Result | Source |
|---|---|---|---|---|
| September 25 | at Mount Hermon | Mount Hermon, MA | L 0–26 | |
| September 30 | at Worcester Tech | Worcester, MA | L 0–16 | |
| October 4 | at Amherst | Pratt Field; Amherst, MA | L 0–26 | |
| October 13 | at Wesleyan | Andrus Field; Middletown, CT | L 12–18 | |
| October 18 | at Williston Seminary | Easthampton, MA | W 38–0 | |
| October 21 | at Yale freshmen | New Haven, CT | L 0–16 | |
| October 23 | at Mount Hermon | Mount Hermon, MA | L 0–54 | |
| October 25 | Springfield YMCA | Alumni Field; Amherst, MA | L 6–18 | |
| November 1 | at Amherst | Pratt Field; Amherst, MA | L 2–16 | |
| November 8 | at Springfield YMCA | Springfield, MA | L 6–46 | |
