= 1893 Carlisle Indians football team =

American college football season

1893 Carlisle Indians football
- Conference: Independent
- Record: 2–1
- Head coach: W. G. Thompson (1st season)
- Home stadium: Dickinson Athletic Field

1893 Eastern college football independents records
	Conf.			Overall
Team	W	L	T	W		L		T
Princeton		–		11	–	0	–	0
Fordham		–		4	–	0	–	0
Harvard		–		12	–	1	–	0
Yale		–		10	–	1	–	0
Colgate		–		3	–	0	–	2
Penn		–		12	–	3	–	0
Penn State		–		4	–	1	–	0
Wesleyan		–		4	–	1	–	0
Holy Ghost		–		6	–	2	–	0
Swarthmore		–		6	–	2	–	1
Lehigh		–		7	–	3	–	0
Brown		–		6	–	3	–	0
Carlisle		–		2	–	1	–	0
Franklin & Marshall		–		4	–	2	–	1
Navy		–		5	–	3	–	0
Washington & Jefferson		–		5	–	3	–	0
Drexel		–		3	–	2	–	0
Bucknell		–		4	–	3	–	0
Amherst		–		7	–	6	–	1
Boston College		–		3	–	3	–	0
Geneva		–		2	–	2	–	1
Army		–		4	–	5	–	0
Williams		–		2	–	3	–	1
Tufts		–		4	–	7	–	0
Cornell		–		3	–	6	–	1
Worcester Tech		–		2	–	4	–	1
Boston University		–		1	–	2	–	0
Lafayette		–		3	–	6	–	0
Syracuse		–		4	–	9	–	1
Western Penn		–		1	–	4	–	0
MIT		–		1	–	5	–	0
Massachusetts		–		1	–	9	–	0
New Hampshire		–		0	–	1	–	0
Rutgers		–		0	–	4	–	0
Maine		–		0	–	5	–	0

The 1893 Carlisle Indians football team represented the Carlisle Indian Industrial School as an independent during the 1893 college football season. The Indians were coached by W. G. Thompson in the school's first year of organized intercollegiate football recognized by the NCAA. The Indians were consistently outsized by the teams they scheduled, and they in turn relied on speed and guile to remain competitive. The team compiled a record of 2–1; outscored opponents 60 to 16. Richard Henry Pratt laid out the fundamental rule of Carlisle football; "Promise me that you'll never slug."

== Schedule ==
Date	Opponent	Site	Result	Attendance	Source
October 11	vs. Dickinson School of Law	Carlisle, PA	L 0–16		
November 11	Harrisburg High School	Carlisle, PA	W 10–0		
November 30	Philadelphia Indians	Dickinson Athletic Field; Carlisle, PA	W 50–0	500	
