= Anson Harrold =

American football player and coach (1870–1907)

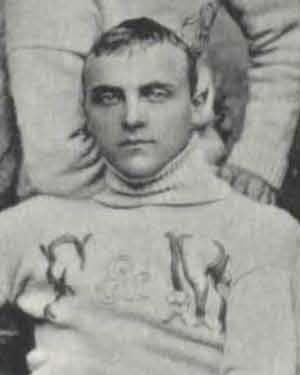
- Harrold with the 1890 Franklin & Marshall football team

Biographical details
- Born: March 10, 1870; Manor, Pennsylvania, U.S.
- Died: April 18, 1907 (aged 37); Barrington, Rhode Island, U.S.
- Height: 6 ft 0 in (183 cm)
- Weight: 170 lb (77 kg)

Playing career
- 1888–1890: Franklin & Marshall
- 1891–1892: Princeton
- 1893: Western U. of Pennsylvania
- 1893–1894: Allegheny Athletic Association
- Position: Tackle

Coaching career (HC unless noted)
- 1893: Western U. of Pennsylvania

Head coaching record
- Overall: 1–4

Anson Forney Harrold (March 10, 1870 – April 18, 1907) was an American football player and coach. He served as the first head football coach at the University of Pittsburgh, then known as Western University of Pennsylvania. As a player-coach, he led the school to a 1–4 record in 1893. Harrold had earlier played football for Franklin & Marshall College, from which he graduated from in 1891 and Princeton University, where he attended from 1891 until graduating in 1893. While with Western University in 1893, he also played for the Allegheny Athletic Association football team. He played again for Allegheny in 1894 and served as the team's captain.

== Work outside football ==
Outside football he worked as a design engineer for 15 years at Westinghouse Electric. He also helped organize the Pittsburgh Transformer Company and worked there for three years. He also became the President of the American Transformer Company, based in Newark, New Jersey.

== Family ==
On September 12, 1893, he married Maude Hubley of Lancaster, Pennsylvania. The couple had one daughter, Elisabeth. Elisabeth married Jesse Gearing Johnson of Bridgton, NJ and they settled in Norfolk, Va.

== Death ==
Harrold died on April 18, 1907, from tuberculosis. He spent the last year of his life trying to regain his health, spending his last summer and fall in the woods of Maine and his last winter in Camden, South Carolina.

== Head coaching record ==
Year	Team	Overall	Conference	Standing	Bowl/playoffs
Western University of Pennsylvania (Independent) (1893)
1893	Western University of Pennsylvania	1–4			
Western University of Pennsylvania:		1–4			
Total:		1–4			
