= 1893 Washington & Jefferson football team =

American college football season

1893 Washington & Jefferson football
- Conference: Independent
- Record: 5–3
- Head coach: Joseph Hamilton (1st season)
- Home stadium: College Park

1893 Eastern college football independents records
	Conf.			Overall
Team	W	L	T	W		L		T
Princeton		–		11	–	0	–	0
Fordham		–		4	–	0	–	0
Harvard		–		12	–	1	–	0
Yale		–		10	–	1	–	0
Colgate		–		3	–	0	–	2
Penn		–		12	–	3	–	0
Penn State		–		4	–	1	–	0
Wesleyan		–		4	–	1	–	0
Holy Ghost		–		6	–	2	–	0
Swarthmore		–		6	–	2	–	1
Lehigh		–		7	–	3	–	0
Brown		–		6	–	3	–	0
Carlisle		–		2	–	1	–	0
Franklin & Marshall		–		4	–	2	–	1
Navy		–		5	–	3	–	0
Washington & Jefferson		–		5	–	3	–	0
Drexel		–		3	–	2	–	0
Bucknell		–		4	–	3	–	0
Amherst		–		7	–	6	–	1
Boston College		–		3	–	3	–	0
Geneva		–		2	–	2	–	1
Army		–		4	–	5	–	0
Williams		–		2	–	3	–	1
Tufts		–		4	–	7	–	0
Cornell		–		3	–	6	–	1
Worcester Tech		–		2	–	4	–	1
Boston University		–		1	–	2	–	0
Lafayette		–		3	–	6	–	0
Syracuse		–		4	–	9	–	1
Western Penn		–		1	–	4	–	0
MIT		–		1	–	5	–	0
Massachusetts		–		1	–	9	–	0
New Hampshire		–		0	–	1	–	0
Rutgers		–		0	–	4	–	0
Maine		–		0	–	5	–	0

The 1893 Washington & Jefferson football team was an American football team that represented Washington & Jefferson College as an independent during the 1893 college football season. Led by Joseph Hamilton in his first and only year as head coach, the team compiled a record of 5–3.

== Schedule ==
Date	Time	Opponent	Site	Result	Source
October 14	2:45 p.m.	Geneva	College Park; Washington, PA	L 6–12	
October 20		Grove City	Washington, PA	W 6–0	
October 28		vs. Gettysburg	Harrisburg, PA	L 16–18	
November 4		Washington YMCA	Washington, PA	W 8–4	
November 11	3:00 p.m.	Holy Ghost College	College Park; Washington, PA	W 22–10	
November 18	2:30 p.m.	at Geneva	Beaver Falls, PA	L 10–28	
November 25		Western University of Pennsylvania	Washington, PA	W 12–0	
November 30		West Virginia	Washington, PA	W 56–0	
