= 1893 Pittsburgh Athletic Club football season =

American football team season

1893 Pittsburgh Athletic Club football
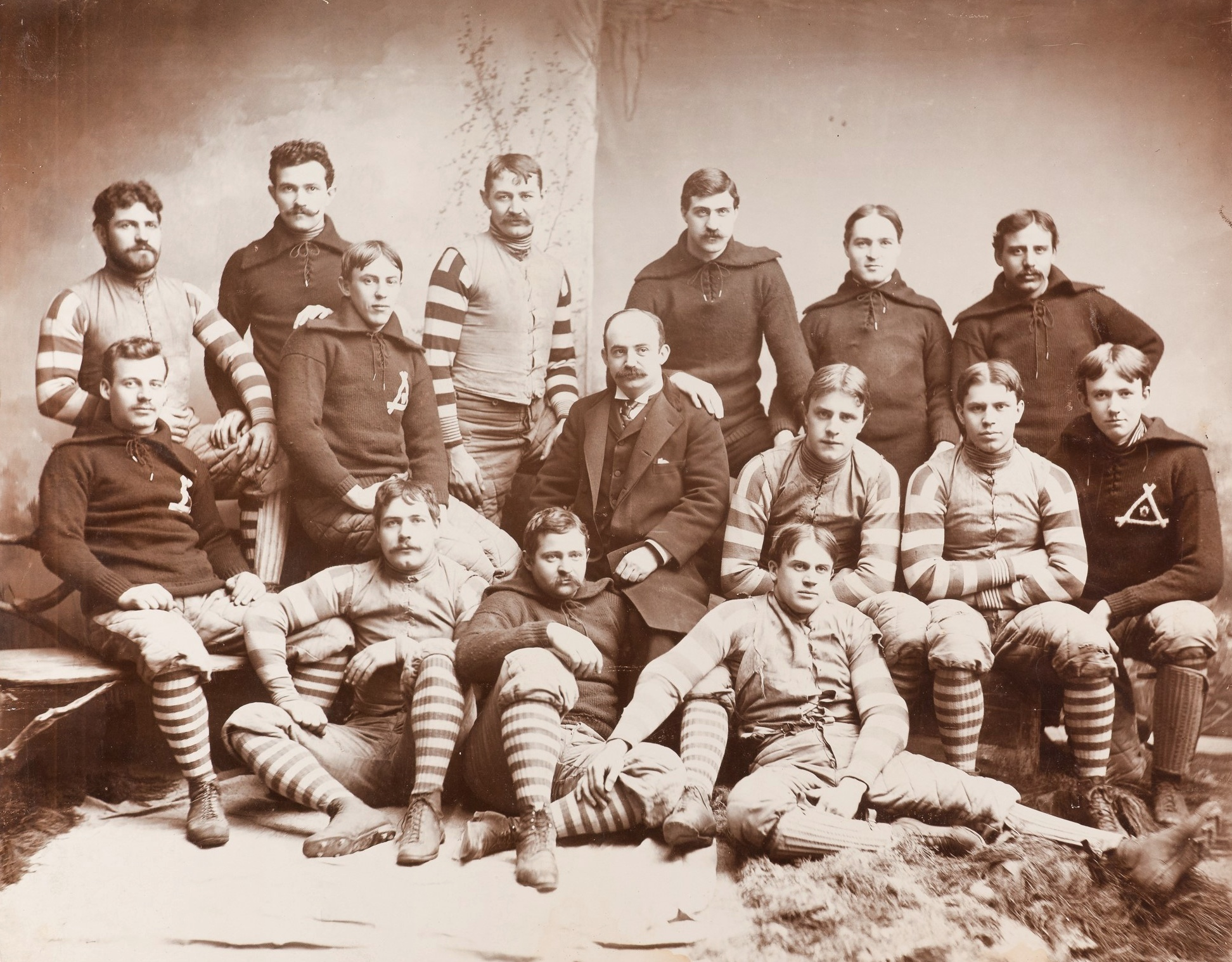
- Record: 7–2
- Manager: John B. Barbour Jr.
- Captain: Charley Aull
- Home field: P.A.C. Park

The 1893 Pittsburgh Athletic Club football season was their fourth season in existence. The team finished with a record of 7–2.

The first known professional football contract was between the Pittsburgh Athletic Club and one of its players, probably halfback Grant Dibert, for the 1893 season.

== Schedule ==
Date	Opponent	Site	Result	Source
October 7	Western University of Pennsylvania	PAC Park; Pittsburgh, PA	W 10–0	
October 14	Greensburg Athletic Association	PAC Park; Pittsburgh, PA	W 10–0	
October 21	Geneva	PAC Park; Pittsburgh, PA	W 18–0	
October 28	Western University of Pennsylvania	PAC Park; Pittsburgh, PA	W 16–10	
November 4	Holy Ghost College	PAC Park; Pittsburgh, PA	W 18–0 or 20–0	
November 7	at Allegheny Athletic Association	AAA Park; Allegheny, PA	W 6–0	(Note: Allegheny made it into the Pittsburgh 10-yard line three times, each time they were unable to score.)
November 18	Allegheny Athletic Association	PAC Park; Pittsburgh, PA	L 4–8	(Note: Pittsburgh fumbled on Allegheny's 2-yard line as time expired.)
November 25	Geneva	PAC Park; Pittsburgh, PA	W 26–4	
November 30	Penn State	PAC Park; Pittsburgh, PA	L 0–12	(Note: Thanksgiving Day game)
