= 1893 Dartmouth football team =

American college football season

1893 Dartmouth football

TFL champion
- Conference: Triangular Football League
- Record: 5–3 (2–0 TFL)
- Head coach: Wallace Moyle (1st season)
- Captain: Edwin E. Jones

1893 Triangular Football League standings
	Conf.					Overall
Team	W		L		T	W		L		T
Dartmouth $	2	–	0	–	0	5	–	3	–	0
Williams	1	–	1	–	0	7	–	3	–	2
Amherst	0	–	2	–	0	7	–	6	–	1
$ – Conference champion

The 1893 Dartmouth football team represented Dartmouth College as a member of the Triangular Football League (TFL) the 1893 college football season. Led by first-year head coach Wallace Moyle, Dartmouth compiled an overall record of 5–3 with a mark of 2–0 in TFL play, winning the league title. Edwin E. Jones was the team's captain and played at tackle. Other members of the team included Fred Folsom at end, George Huff at guard, and Walter McCornack at quarterback.

== Schedule ==
Date	Time	Opponent	Site	Result	Attendance	Source
September 30		at Harvard*	Jarvis Field; Cambridge, MA (rivalry)	L 0–16	2,000	
October 13		at Trinity (CT)*	Trinity grounds; Hartford, CT	W 16–6	300–500	
October 14		at Yale*	Yale Field; New Haven, CT	L 0–28	800–1,200	
October 21	2:45 p.m.	at Harvard*	Jarvis Field; Cambridge, MA	L 0–36	2,200	
November 4		at Williams	Weston Field; Williamstown, MA	W 20–0		
November 8		Tufts*	Dartmouth oval; Hanover, NH	W 14–4	800	
November 11	2:35 p.m.	Amherst	Hanover, NH	W 34–0	2,000	
November 30		vs. Union (NY)*	Troy, NY	W 22–0	4,000	
*Non-conference game
