= 1893 Williams Ephs football team =

American college football season

1893 Williams Ephs football
- Conference: Triangular Football League
- Record: 7–3–2 (1–1 TFL)
- Head coach: None
- Home stadium: Weston Field

1893 Triangular Football League standings
	Conf.					Overall
Team	W		L		T	W		L		T
Dartmouth $	2	–	0	–	0	5	–	3	–	0
Williams	1	–	1	–	0	7	–	3	–	2
Amherst	0	–	2	–	0	7	–	6	–	1
$ – Conference champion

The 1893 Williams Ephs football team represented the Williams College as a member of the Triangular Football League (TFL) during the 1893 college football season. Williams compiled an overall record of 7–3–2 with a mark of 1–1 in conference play, placing second in the TFL. The team played home games at Weston Field in Williamstown, Massachusetts.

== Schedule ==
Date	Time	Opponent	Site	Result	Attendance	Source
September 30		at Laureates of Troy*	Troy, NY	W 20–0		
October 4		Mount Hermon*	Weston Field; Williamstown, MA	W 14–0		
October 7		Laureates of Troy*	Weston Field; Williamstown, MA	W 16–0	400	
October 11		Worcester Tech*	Weston Field; Williamstown, MA	W 66–0		
October 14	3:00 p.m.	at Harvard*	Jarvis Field; Cambridge, MA	L 0–52		
October 18		Union (NY)*	Weston Field; Williamstown, MA	W 12–6	400	
October 21		at Laureates of Troy*	Troy, NY	T 12–12	1,000–1,500	
October 25		at Yale*	Yale Field; New Haven, CT	L 0–82	1,500	
October 28		vs. Cornell*	Ridgefield grounds; Albany, NY	T 10–10	2,000	
November 4		Dartmouth	Weston Field; Williamstown, MA	L 0–20		
November 11		Tufts*	Weston Field; Williamstown, MA	W 22–4	350	
November 18	2:00 p.m.	at Amherst	Pratt Field; Amherst, MA (rivalry)	W 30–12	1,500	
*Non-conference game
