= Beaver Field =

Sports field in Pennsylvania, US, 1892–1908

- Old Beaver Field
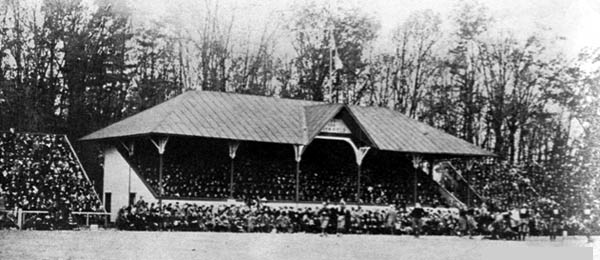
- Grandstands of Beaver Field.
- Interactive map of Beaver Field
- Full name: Beaver Field
- Location: University Park, Pennsylvania
- Coordinates: 40°47′56.4″N 77°51′47.0″W
- Owner: Penn State University
- Operator: Penn State University
- Capacity: 500
- Surface: Grass

Construction
- Groundbreaking: 1891
- Opened: 1893
- Closed: 1909; 117 years ago
- Cost: $3,000

Tenants
- Penn State football (1893–1908); Penn State baseball (1893–1908)

Beaver Field (1892–1908), was the first official home to the Penn State football and baseball teams in University Park, Pennsylvania, United States. Retroactively known as "Old Beaver Field", it had a capacity of 500 and stood between present-day Osmond and Frear Laboratories, now the site of a parking lot.

== History ==
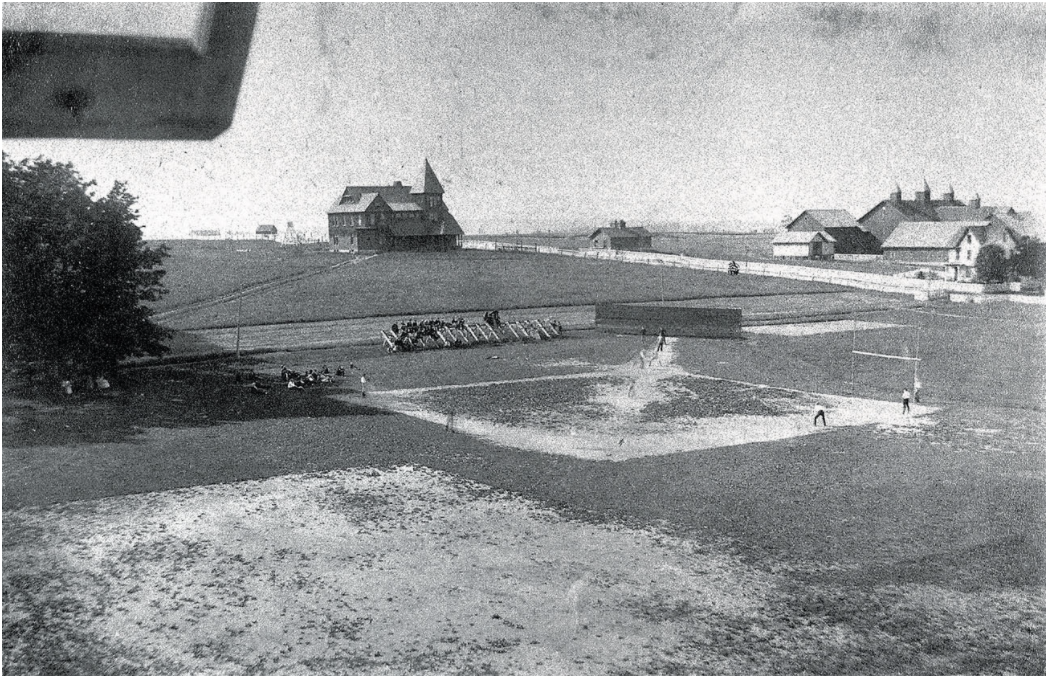
Baseball game on the original Old Beaver Field location, ca. 1877–78. Window frame in upper-left corner shows that photo was taken from an upper floor of the Chemistry-Physics Building.

Until the construction of Beaver Field, sports teams of the then Pennsylvania State College, known as the Nittany Lions, played on the Old Main Lawn, a grassy area outside the main classroom building. Beaver Field served as the first official home for the football and baseball teams.

The football team moved in 1909 to New Beaver Field, which held 30,000 fans and served as Penn State's home stadium until 1959, when it was disassembled and moved to the current location of Beaver Stadium in 1960. After the move to New Beaver Field, the original field became known as Old Beaver Field.

The field had a grandstand that seated 500. This took the form of a hip-roofed building with no side walls, supported by rows of six columns at the front and rear plus one on each side. A gable at the front bore the name "Beaver Field", below it the year, 1893, and "P.S.C."

Beaver Field was named in June 1892 for James A. Beaver, who was governor of Pennsylvania from 1887 to 1891. Although the state did not usually fund athletics in its public colleges, leaving that to student fees and alumni gifts, Beaver had a line added to the legislative appropriation for Pennsylvania State College that provided $2,000 in 1891–92 and $1,000 in 1893–94 for improving its athletic grounds. These funds made it possible to lay out a quarter-mile track enclosing baseball and football grounds, tennis courts, and a grandstand. The field opened on November 6, 1893, after a two-day weather delay, with a game against Western University of Pennsylvania that Penn State won 32–0.

Beaver Field began as a plot of grass on Penn State's campus located in the academic village. The land was designated for athletics by faculty in 1875 with growing demand for sport. By 1890 the grass field had a dirt running track, a baseball diamond and a football field and a set of covered wooden bleachers with a seating capacity of 100.

Calls from students pushed the university to begin exploring its options to expand its athletic facilities. Then university president James A. Beaver was able to use his political influence as the former Governor of Pennsylvania to push Pennsylvania's legislature to appropriate funds to build a proper athletics facility.

Penn State received $2,000 (equivalent to $71,667 in 2025) in 1891, and an additional $1,000 (equivalent to $35,833 in 2025) in 1893 to help construct Beaver Field, a stadium with a grandstand, football field, and quarter mile track.
