= 1893 college football season =

American college football season

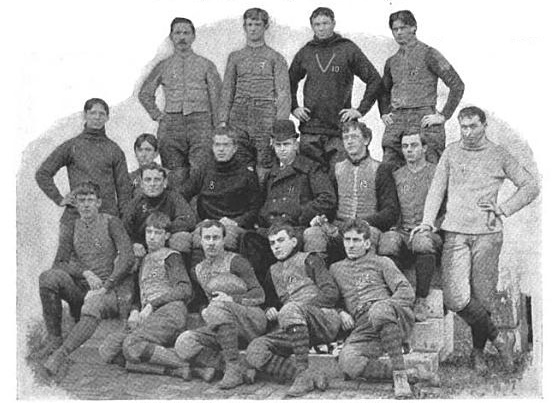
- 1893 Vanderbilt Commodores
- Champion(s): Princeton; Yale

The 1893 college football season was the season of American football played among colleges and universities in the United States during the 1893–94 academic year.

The 1893 Princeton Tigers football team, led by captain Thomas Trenchard, compiled a perfect 11–0 record, outscored opponents by a total of 270 to 14, and has been recognized as the national champion by the Billingsley Report, Helms Athletic Foundation, Houlgate System, and National Championship Foundation. Despite Yale's loss to Princeton, one selector (Parke H. Davis) recognized the Bulldogs as the national champion.

All eleven players selected by Caspar Whitney and Walter Camp to the 1893 All-America college football team came from the Big Three (Princeton, Yale, and Harvard). Seven of the honorees have been inducted into the College Football Hall of Fame: quarterback Philip King, fullback Charley Brewer (Harvard), end Frank Hinkey (Yale), tackle Marshall Newell (Harvard), tackle Langdon Lea (Princeton), guard Art Wheeler (Princeton), and guard Bill Hickok (Yale).

New programs established in 1893 included Boston College, LSU, Oregon State, Texas, and Washington State.

== Football in 1893 ==
American football in 1893 was a variant of rugby football, played with a rugby ball and making use of rules closely derived from the original sport. The field of play was 110 yards long and 53-1/3 yards wide, with chalk lines every five yards to help the referee determine necessary distances. Forward passing was prohibited; only lateral passing or running with the ball was allowed. Teams of eleven were divided into seven "rushers or forwards" positioned at the line of scrimmage, with four backs behind the line — a quarterback just behind the line, two halfbacks located about two yards behind him, and a fullback or "goal-tend," who stood about a dozen yards behind the halfbacks.

Kickoffs were generally executed by kicking the ball forward slightly for a self-recovery and quick lateral pass to a teammate who carried the ball in the middle of a V-shaped blocking wedge of his teammates. When the ball was brought to a standstill, the runner would cry "down" and a line of scrimmage formed, with the "center-rusher" (also called the "snap-back") hiking the ball to the quarterback. The quarterback would generally pitch the ball to one of the three backs behind him to attempt to run forward, while the defenders would "endeavor by all lawful means to retard that advance."

The offense would retain the ball if it was able to gain 5 yards in three downs — or by retreating 20 yards towards their own goal line. The ball would generally be punted away after two downs "if the prospects of completing the 5-yard gain appear small."

A touchdown counted as 4 points and allowed the scoring team the opportunity to add two more points by kicking the ball over the crossbar and through the goal posts, which were planted at the goal line. After a touchdown, the scoring team had the option of bringing out the ball as far as desired at a right angle from the point at which the ball crossed the goal line (as in modern rugby) and attempting a place kick, or by executing a "punt out" from the end zone to a teammate making a fair catch, from which spot a drop-kick for the extra points could be attempted.

A drop kick through the goal posts from the field counted as 5 points. As with the contemporary game, safeties counted for 2 points.

The game consisted of two 45-minute halves with an intermission of 10 minutes, although duration of the game could be shortened by mutual consent. No coaching was allowed from the sidelines, all game decisions had to be made by the players on the field. Once removed from the game for a substitute, a player could not return to the game (as in modern soccer).

== Popular opposition ==
While football grew in popularity during the decade of the 1890s, opposition to the brutality of the game also began to come to the fore. On December 3, the San Francisco Chronicle offered a grim view of "modern football", declaring that the game was little more than "a succession of rushes, of scrimmages, of wrestling matches, and sometimes of fist-fights, each side trying to bear down the other by sheer force of weight and strength."

Noting that some state legislatures were moving towards banning the sport, the editorialist argued that negative public sentiment leading to rule changes was critical. "We may go and see a hardly contested game, and be carried off our feet by the excitement of the moment," it was declared, but upon further consideration "the prevailing recollection will be one of extreme roughness, if not of actual and deliberate brutality, and that is something ill befitting anything which is properly designated sport." If rules changes were not made and the game not "humanized," then "we venture to say that its popularity will not endure very long."

== Conference and program changes ==
| School | 1892 Conference | 1893 Conference |
|---|---|---|
| Boston College Eagles | Program Established | Independent |
| Louisiana State University Tigers | Program Established | Independent |
| New Hampshire College Wildcats | Program Established | Independent |
| Oregon Agricultural Aggies | Program Established | Independent |
| Texas Longhorns | Program established | Independent |
| Washington Agricultural Cougars | Program Established | Independent |

== Princeton v. Yale ==
As the Princeton and Yale teams prepared to meet in late November 1893, an unprecedented amount of media and public attention fell upon the big game, which was being billed as the championship game of the season. Both teams entered the game with undefeated with records of 10–0. Yale had outscored its opponents 336-6 and was riding a 37-game winning streak dating back to a loss to Harvard in 1890. Princeton had outscored its opponents by a cumulative total of 264–14, and was seeking to avenge its 12–0 loss to Yale the previous year. A crowd of 40,000, the largest ever to see a football game up to that time, showed up at the Polo Grounds in New York to see the two teams take the field. Three-time Consensus All-American Phil King led Princeton into the game. He would later head the Princeton Football Association and help coach. King had just developed the double wingback formation with the ends deployed on the wings of the line.

From the double wingback formation, Princeton precisely executed a complete set of plays and completely befuddled the Yale eleven, captained by college football Hall of Famer Frank Hinkey. The New York Sun noted that "Princeton in 1893 had the finest offensive machine it had developed up to this time – a team with continuity of attack, the ability to pile first down upon first down." Princeton was able to cross the goal once and held Yale scoreless, thus winning 6–0 and claiming the national championship.

However, the game did not pass without engendering some controversy. The New York Herald declared in a scathing commentary: "Thanksgiving Day is no longer a solemn festival to God for mercies given. It is a holiday granted by the State and the Nation to see a game of football. The kicker now is king and the people bow down to him. The gory nosed tackler, hero of a hundred scrimmages and half as many wrecked wedges, is the idol of the hour. With swollen face and bleeding head, daubed from crown to sole with the mud of Manhattan Field, he stands triumphant amid the cheers of thousands. What matters that the purpose of the day is perverted, that church is foregone, that family reunion is neglected, that dinner is delayed if not forgot. Has not Princeton played a mighty game with Yale and has not Princeton won? This is the modern Thanksgiving Day."

The Yale-Princeton Thanksgiving Day game of 1893 earned $13,000 for each school from gate receipts, as the big games became the primary source of revenue for the college's athletic programs.

== Conference standings ==
The following is a potentially incomplete list of conference standings:

1893 Colorado Football Association standings
| | Conf. | | | | | Overall |
| Team | W | | L | | T | W | | L | | T |
|---|---|---|---|---|---|---|---|---|---|---|
| Colorado Mines $ | 3 | – | 0 | – | 0 | 4 | – | 1 | – | 0 |
| Colorado | 1 | – | 1 | – | 0 | 2 | – | 3 | – | 0 |
| Colorado Agricultural | 1 | – | 3 | – | 0 | 1 | – | 3 | – | 0 |
| Denver | 0 | – | 2 | – | 0 | 1 | – | 2 | – | 0 |
$ – Conference champion

1893 Indiana Intercollegiate Athletic Association football standings
| | Conf. | | | | | Overall |
| Team | W | | L | | T | W | | L | | T |
|---|---|---|---|---|---|---|---|---|---|---|
| Purdue $ | 4 | – | 0 | – | 0 | 5 | – | 2 | – | 1 |
| DePauw | 3 | – | 1 | – | 0 | 6 | – | 3 | – | 0 |
| Butler | 2 | – | 2 | – | 0 | 4 | – | 2 | – | 0 |
| Wabash | 1 | – | 3 | – | 0 | 2 | – | 4 | – | 0 |
| Indiana | 0 | – | 4 | – | 0 | 1 | – | 4 | – | 1 |
$ – Conference champion

1893 Intercollegiate Athletic Association of the Northwest football standings
| | Conf. | | | | | Overall |
| Team | W | | L | | T | W | | L | | T |
|---|---|---|---|---|---|---|---|---|---|---|
| Minnesota $ | 3 | – | 0 | – | 0 | 6 | – | 0 | – | 0 |
| Wisconsin | 1 | – | 1 | – | 0 | 4 | – | 2 | – | 0 |
| Michigan | 1 | – | 2 | – | 0 | 7 | – | 3 | – | 0 |
| Northwestern | 0 | – | 2 | – | 0 | 2 | – | 5 | – | 3 |
$ – Conference champion

1893 Triangular Football League standings
| | Conf. | | | | | Overall |
| Team | W | | L | | T | W | | L | | T |
|---|---|---|---|---|---|---|---|---|---|---|
| Dartmouth $ | 2 | – | 0 | – | 0 | 5 | – | 3 | – | 0 |
| Williams | 1 | – | 1 | – | 0 | 7 | – | 3 | – | 2 |
| Amherst | 0 | – | 2 | – | 0 | 7 | – | 6 | – | 1 |
$ – Conference champion

1893 Western Interstate University Football Association standings
| | Conf. | | | | | Overall |
| Team | W | | L | | T | W | | L | | T |
|---|---|---|---|---|---|---|---|---|---|---|
| Missouri + | 2 | – | 1 | – | 0 | 4 | – | 3 | – | 0 |
| Kansas + | 2 | – | 1 | – | 0 | 2 | – | 5 | – | 0 |
| Nebraska | 1 | – | 2 | – | 0 | 3 | – | 2 | – | 1 |
| Iowa | 1 | – | 2 | – | 0 | 3 | – | 4 | – | 0 |
+ – Conference co-champions

=== Independents ===
1893 Eastern college football independents records
| | Conf. | | | Overall |
| Team | W | L | T | W | | L | | T |
|---|---|---|---|---|---|---|---|---|
| Princeton | | – | | 11 | – | 0 | – | 0 |
| Fordham | | – | | 4 | – | 0 | – | 0 |
| Harvard | | – | | 12 | – | 1 | – | 0 |
| Yale | | – | | 10 | – | 1 | – | 0 |
| Colgate | | – | | 3 | – | 0 | – | 2 |
| Penn | | – | | 12 | – | 3 | – | 0 |
| Penn State | | – | | 4 | – | 1 | – | 0 |
| Wesleyan | | – | | 4 | – | 1 | – | 0 |
| Holy Ghost | | – | | 6 | – | 2 | – | 0 |
| Swarthmore | | – | | 6 | – | 2 | – | 1 |
| Lehigh | | – | | 7 | – | 3 | – | 0 |
| Brown | | – | | 6 | – | 3 | – | 0 |
| Carlisle | | – | | 2 | – | 1 | – | 0 |
| Franklin & Marshall | | – | | 4 | – | 2 | – | 1 |
| Navy | | – | | 5 | – | 3 | – | 0 |
| Washington & Jefferson | | – | | 5 | – | 3 | – | 0 |
| Drexel | | – | | 3 | – | 2 | – | 0 |
| Bucknell | | – | | 4 | – | 3 | – | 0 |
| Boston College | | – | | 3 | – | 3 | – | 0 |
| Geneva | | – | | 2 | – | 2 | – | 1 |
| Army | | – | | 4 | – | 5 | – | 0 |
| Tufts | | – | | 4 | – | 7 | – | 0 |
| Cornell | | – | | 3 | – | 6 | – | 1 |
| Worcester Tech | | – | | 2 | – | 4 | – | 1 |
| Boston University | | – | | 1 | – | 2 | – | 0 |
| Lafayette | | – | | 3 | – | 6 | – | 0 |
| Syracuse | | – | | 4 | – | 9 | – | 1 |
| Western Penn | | – | | 1 | – | 4 | – | 0 |
| MIT | | – | | 1 | – | 5 | – | 0 |
| Massachusetts | | – | | 1 | – | 9 | – | 0 |
| New Hampshire | | – | | 0 | – | 1 | – | 0 |
| Rutgers | | – | | 0 | – | 4 | – | 0 |
| Maine | | – | | 0 | – | 5 | – | 0 |

1893 Midwestern college football independents records
| | Conf. | | | Overall |
| Team | W | L | T | W | | L | | T |
|---|---|---|---|---|---|---|---|---|
| Case | | – | | 4 | – | 0 | – | 0 |
| Miami (OH) | | – | | 3 | – | 0 | – | 0 |
| Baker | | – | | 5 | – | 0 | – | 1 |
| Oberlin | | – | | 6 | – | 1 | – | 0 |
| Hillsdale | | – | | 4 | – | 1 | – | 0 |
| Notre Dame | | – | | 4 | – | 1 | – | 0 |
| Buchtel | | – | | 5 | – | 2 | – | 0 |
| Butler | | – | | 4 | – | 2 | – | 0 |
| Michigan State Normal | | – | | 4 | – | 2 | – | 0 |
| Chicago | | – | | 6 | – | 4 | – | 2 |
| Beloit | | – | | 4 | – | 3 | – | 0 |
| Illinois | | – | | 3 | – | 2 | – | 3 |
| Lake Forest | | – | | 3 | – | 2 | – | 3 |
| Doane | | – | | 2 | – | 2 | – | 0 |
| Heidelberg | | – | | 2 | – | 2 | – | 0 |
| Kansas State Normal | | – | | 1 | – | 1 | – | 0 |
| Wabash | | – | | 3 | – | 3 | – | 0 |
| Washburn | | – | | 1 | – | 1 | – | 1 |
| Washington University | | – | | 1 | – | 1 | – | 0 |
| Ohio State | | – | | 4 | – | 5 | – | 0 |
| Wittenberg | | – | | 2 | – | 3 | – | 0 |
| Mount Union | | – | | 1 | – | 2 | – | 0 |
| Drake | | – | | 0 | – | 2 | – | 1 |
| Baldwin–Wallace | | – | | 0 | – | 1 | – | 0 |
| College of Emporia | | – | | 0 | – | 1 | – | 0 |
| Ohio Wesleyan | | – | | 0 | – | 1 | – | 0 |
| Kalamazoo | | – | | 0 | – | 2 | – | 0 |
| Iowa Agricultural | | – | | 0 | – | 3 | – | 0 |
| Cincinnati | | – | | 0 | – | 6 | – | 0 |

1893 Southern college football independents records
| | Conf. | | | Overall |
| Team | W | L | T | W | | L | | T |
|---|---|---|---|---|---|---|---|---|
| Maryland | | – | | 6 | – | 0 | – | 0 |
| Texas | | – | | 4 | – | 0 | – | 0 |
| Central (KY) | | – | | 2 | – | 0 | – | 0 |
| Howard | | – | | 2 | – | 0 | – | 0 |
| North Carolina A&M | | – | | 2 | – | 0 | – | 0 |
| Vanderbilt | | – | | 6 | – | 1 | – | 0 |
| Auburn | | – | | 3 | – | 0 | – | 2 |
| Virginia | | – | | 8 | – | 2 | – | 0 |
| Ole Miss | | – | | 4 | – | 1 | – | 0 |
| Centre | | – | | 4 | – | 1 | – | 0 |
| Trinity (NC) | | – | | 3 | – | 1 | – | 0 |
| VMI | | – | | 3 | – | 1 | – | 0 |
| Kentucky State College | | – | | 5 | – | 2 | – | 1 |
| Delaware | | – | | 2 | – | 1 | – | 0 |
| Georgia Tech | | – | | 2 | – | 1 | – | 0 |
| Guilford | | – | | 2 | – | 1 | – | 0 |
| West Virginia | | – | | 2 | – | 1 | – | 0 |
| William & Mary | | – | | 2 | – | 1 | – | 0 |
| Navy | | – | | 5 | – | 3 | – | 0 |
| Richmond | | – | | 3 | – | 2 | – | 0 |
| Georgetown | | – | | 4 | – | 4 | – | 0 |
| Sewanee | | – | | 3 | – | 3 | – | 0 |
| Furman | | – | | 1 | – | 1 | – | 0 |
| Georgia | | – | | 2 | – | 2 | – | 1 |
| Western Maryland | | – | | 1 | – | 1 | – | 0 |
| Johns Hopkins | | – | | 2 | – | 3 | – | 2 |
| North Carolina | | – | | 3 | – | 4 | – | 0 |
| Tennessee | | – | | 2 | – | 4 | – | 0 |
| Tulane | | – | | 1 | – | 2 | – | 0 |
| Wake Forest | | – | | 1 | – | 2 | – | 0 |
| Hampden–Sydney | | – | | 0 | – | 1 | – | 0 |
| LSU | | – | | 0 | – | 1 | – | 0 |
| Maryville (TN) | | – | | 0 | – | 1 | – | 0 |
| Mercer | | – | | 0 | – | 1 | – | 0 |
| Wofford | | – | | 0 | – | 1 | – | 0 |
| VAMC | | – | | 0 | – | 2 | – | 0 |
| Alabama | | – | | 0 | – | 4 | – | 0 |

1893 Far West college football independents records
| | Conf. | | | Overall |
| Team | W | L | T | W | | L | | T |
|---|---|---|---|---|---|---|---|---|
| Stanford | | – | | 8 | – | 0 | – | 1 |
| Pacific University | | – | | 2 | – | 0 | – | 0 |
| Gonzaga | | – | | 1 | – | 0 | – | 0 |
| Saint Mary's | | – | | 1 | – | 0 | – | 0 |
| Wyoming | | – | | 1 | – | 0 | – | 0 |
| Oregon Agricultural | | – | | 5 | – | 1 | – | 0 |
| California | | – | | 5 | – | 1 | – | 1 |
| USC | | – | | 3 | – | 1 | – | 0 |
| Washington | | – | | 1 | – | 3 | – | 1 |
| Idaho | | – | | 0 | – | 0 | – | 1 |
| San Jose Normal | | – | | 0 | – | 1 | – | 0 |
| Albany College | | – | | 0 | – | 1 | – | 0 |
| Oregon State Normal | | – | | 0 | – | 4 | – | 0 |

== See also ==
- 1893 College Football All-America Team
