= Boston University Terriers football =

College football program of Boston University

- First season: 1884; 142 years ago
- Last season: 1997; 29 years ago
- Stadium: Nickerson Field (capacity: 10,412)
- Location: Boston, Massachusetts
- NCAA division: Division I-AA
- Conference: Atlantic 10 Conference
- All-time record: 323–390–34 (.455)
- Bowl record: 0–1 (.000)

Conference championships
- 5 (1980, 1982, 1983, 1984, 1993)
- Rivalries: Boston College Eagles; Holy Cross Crusaders; UMass Minutemen; Northeastern Huskies
- Colors: Scarlet and white
- Fight song: GO B.U.
- Mascot: Rhett the Boston Terrier

The Boston University Terriers football team was the American football team for Boston University located in Boston, Massachusetts. The school's first football team was fielded in 1884, and the program was discontinued in 1997. The Terriers football team compiled an all-time record of 323–390–34. The team competed in NCAA Division I-AA from its formation in 1978, as members of the Yankee Conference and later the Atlantic 10 Conference.

Boston University terminated the varsity football program on homecoming weekend in 1997, during a one-win season in the Atlantic 10. Players were allowed to keep their four-year scholarships or transfer without NCAA penalties. At the time of its termination the program ran at an annual loss of $2.91 million. Boston University has used the former football scholarships to comply with Title IX requirements. Boston University still fields a club football squad in the modern Yankee Conference.

== Notable former players ==
Notable alumni include:

- Harry Agganis: Quarterback; Boston Red Sox player; namesake of the Agganis Arena
- Bill Brooks: Wide Receiver, Indianapolis Colts 1986–92, Buffalo Bills 1993–95, Washington Redskins 1996
- Butch Byrd: Running Back and Pass Receiver, Buffalo Bills Defensive Back 1964–1970, Denver Broncos 1971
- Dick Farley: Defensive Back, San Diego Chargers 1968–69; Hall of Fame coach, Williams College
- Darvell Huffman: Wide Receiver, Indianapolis Colts 1990–91
- Pat Hughes: Linebacker, New York Giants 1970–76, New Orleans Saints 1977–79
- Jim "Crash" Jensen: Quarterback, Wide Receiver, Miami Dolphins 1981–92
- Kevin Murphy: Arena Football League player
- Gene Prebola: American Football League player
- Reggie Rucker: Wide Receiver, Dallas Cowboys 1969–71, New York Giants 1971, New England Patriots 1971–74, Cleveland Browns 1975–81
- Bruce Taylor: Defensive Back, San Francisco 49ers 1970–77

== Championships ==
Year	Conference	Coach	Overall Record	Conference Record
1980	Yankee Conference	Rick Taylor	9–2	5-0
1982†	Yankee Conference	Rick Taylor	5–6	3-2
1983†	Yankee Conference	Rick Taylor	9–4	4-1
1984†	Yankee Conference	Rick Taylor	9–3	4-1
1993	Yankee Conference	Dan Allen	12–1	8-0
Total conference championships			5	

† denotes co-championship.

== Division I-AA Playoffs results ==
The Terriers appeared in the I-AA playoffs five times with a record of 2–5.

Year	Round	Opponent	Result
1982	First Round	Colgate	L 7–21
1983	First Round; Quarterfinals	Eastern Kentucky; Furman	W 24–20; L 16–35
1984	First Round	Richmond	L 33–35
1993	First Round; Quarterfinals	Northern Iowa; Idaho	W 27–21 ^{2OT} L 14–21
1994	First Round	Eastern Kentucky	L 23–30

== Bowl games ==
The Terriers had a record of 0–1 in bowl games. Boston University appeared in one bowl game during their tenure. As a member of the College Division, they played against a member of the University Division in the Pasadena Bowl.

Year	Coach	Bowl	Opponent	Result
December 6, 1969	Larry Naviaux	Pasadena Bowl	San Diego State	L 7–28
