= List of Maine Black Bears football seasons =

This is a list of seasons completed by the Maine Black Bears football team, which represents the University of Maine of Orono, Maine, in intercollegiate football in the United States.

== Seasons ==
National champions	Conference champions	Bowl game berth	Playoff berth

Season	Year	Head coach	Association	Division	Conference	Record							Postseason	Final ranking
Season	Year	Head coach	Association	Division	Conference	Overall			Conference				Postseason	Final ranking
Season	Year	Head coach	Association	Division	Conference	Win	Loss	Tie	Finish	Win	Loss	Tie	Postseason	Final ranking
Maine Black Bears
1892	1892	Chesley Johnston	—	—	—	0	2	0					—	—
1893	1893	Wildes Veazie	—	—	—	0	5	0					—	—
1894	1894	—	—	—	—	0	1	0					—	—
1895	1895	P. Folsom	—	—	—	1	4	0					—	—
1896	1896	Jack Abbott	—	—	—	1	3	2					—	—
1897	1897	Harry Orman Robinson	—	—	—	1	2	0					—	—
1898	1898	Jim Coombs	—	—	—	1	4	0					—	—
1899	1899	W. B. Hopkins	—	—	—	2	3	0					—	—
1900	1900	Ernest Burton	—	—	—	4	4	0					—	—
1901	1901	John Wells Farley	—	—	—	7	1	0					—	—
1902	1902	Edward N. Robinson	—	—	—	6	2	0					—	—
1903	1903	John Wells Farley	—	—	—	5	3	0					—	—
1904	1904	Emmett O. King	—	—	—	3	4	0					—	—
1905	1905	Frank McCoy	—	—	—	3	3	1					—	—
1906	1906	Frank McCoy	—	—	—	2	4	2					—	—
1907	1907	Frank McCoy	—	—	—	2	4	2					—	—
1908	1908	Frank McCoy	—	—	—	3	4	0					—	—
1909	1909	George Schildmiller	—	—	—	3	4	1					—	—
1910	1910	Edgar Wingard	—	—	—	4	1	2					—	—
1911	1911	Edgar Wingard	—	—	—	6	2	0					—	—
1912	1912	Thomas J. Riley	—	—	—	7	1	0					—	—
1913	1913	Thomas J. Riley	—	—	—	5	2	1					—	—
1914	1914	Eddie Cochems	—	—	—	6	3	0					—	—
1915	1915	Tommy Hughitt	—	—	—	6	3	0					—	—
1916	1916	Tommy Hughitt	—	—	—	0	4	3					—	—
1917	1917	Thomas A. McCann	—	—	—	1	3	0					—	—
1918	1918	Donald R. Aldworth	—	—	—	3	1	0					—	—
1919	1919	James A. Baldwin	—	—	—	6	1	0					—	—
1920	1920	James A. Baldwin	—	—	—	3	3	3					—	—
1921	1921	Fred Brice	—	—	—	2	5	1					—	—
1922	1922	Fred Brice	—	—	—	6	2	0					—	—
1923	1923	Fred Brice	—	—	New England	5	3	0	1st	3	0	0	—	—
1924	1924	Fred Brice	—	—	New England	4	3	1	3rd	1	2	0	—	—
1925	1925	Fred Brice	—	—	New England	5	2	1	2nd	1	1	1	—	—
1926	1926	Fred Brice	—	—	New England	7	1	0	T–2nd	2	1	0	—	—
1927	1927	Fred Brice	—	—	New England	6	1	0	1st	3	0	0	—	—
1928	1928	Fred Brice	—	—	New England	4	1	2	T–1st	2	0	1	—	—
1929	1929	Fred Brice	—	—	New England	2	5	0	T–3rd	1	2	0	—	—
1930	1930	Fred Brice	—	—	New England	3	4	0	2nd	2	1	0	—	—
1931	1931	Fred Brice	—	—	New England	4	3	0	2nd	1	2	0	—	—
1932	1932	Fred Brice	—	—	New England	5	1	1	1st	2	0	1	—	—
1933	1933	Fred Brice	—	—	New England	4	3	0	4th	0	2	0	—	—
1934	1934	Fred Brice	—	—	New England	4	3	0	4th	0	2	0	—	—
1935	1935	Fred Brice	—	—	New England	3	3	1	1st	2	0	0	—	—
1936	1936	Fred Brice	—	—	New England	4	3	0	2nd	1	1	0	—	—
1937	1937	Fred Brice	—	—	New England	2	3	2	2nd	0	1	1	—	—
1938	1938	Fred Brice	—	—	New England	3	4	0	2nd	2	1	0	—	—
1939	1939	Fred Brice	—	—	New England	5	2	0	1st	3	0	0	—	—
1940	1940	Fred Brice	—	—	New England	1	6	0	T–3rd	1	2	0	—	—
1941	1941	George E. Allen	—	—	New England	3	2	2	2nd	2	1	1	—	—
1942	1942	William C. Kenyon	—	—	New England	2	4	0	T–4th	0	2	0	—	—
1943	1943	Samuel Sezak	—	—	New England	0	1	0	N/A	0	0	0	—	—
1944	1944	William C. Kenyon	—	—	New England	2	2	0	T–1st	1	1	0	—	—
1945	1945	William C. Kenyon	—	—	New England	0	5	0	3rd	0	3	0	—	—
1946	1946	George E. Allen	—	—	New England	2	5	0	4th	0	3	0	—	—
1947	1947	George E. Allen	—	—	Yankee	6	1	0	2nd	2	1	0	—	—
1948	1948	George E. Allen	—	—	Yankee	4	3	0	5th	1	2	0	—	—
1949	1949	David M. Nelson	—	—	Yankee	2	4	1	T–1st	2	0	1	—	—
1950	1950	David M. Nelson	—	—	Yankee	5	1	1	2nd	3	1	0	—	—
1951	1951	Harold Westerman	—	—	Yankee	6	0	1	T–1st	3	0	1	—	—
1952	1952	Harold Westerman	—	—	Yankee	4	3	0	T–1st	3	1	0	—	—
1953	1953	Harold Westerman	—	—	Yankee	4	2	1	3rd	1	2	1	—	—
1954	1954	Harold Westerman	—	—	Yankee	5	2	0	3rd	2	2	0	—	—
1955	1955	Harold Westerman	—	—	Yankee	5	1	1	2nd	2	1	1	—	—
1956	1956	Harold Westerman	NCAA	College	Yankee	5	2	0	2nd	3	1	0	—	—
1957	1957	Harold Westerman	NCAA	College	Yankee	4	3	0	3rd	2	2	0	—	—
1958	1958	Harold Westerman	NCAA	College	Yankee	6	2	0	2nd	4	1	0	—	—
1959	1959	Harold Westerman	NCAA	College	Yankee	3	3	2	3rd	1	2	2	—	—
1960	1960	Harold Westerman	NCAA	College	Yankee	4	3	1	3rd	3	2	0	—	—
1961	1961	Harold Westerman	NCAA	College	Yankee	8	0	1	1st	5	0	0	—	—
1962	1962	Harold Westerman	NCAA	College	Yankee	4	4	0	6th	1	4	0	—	—
1963	1963	Harold Westerman	NCAA	College	Yankee	5	3	0	2nd	3	2	0	—	—
1964	1964	Harold Westerman	NCAA	College	Yankee	5	3	0	4th	2	3	0	—	—
1965	1965	Harold Westerman	NCAA	College	Yankee	8	2	0	1st	5	0	0	Lost Tangerine Bowl	—
1966	1966	Harold Westerman	NCAA	College	Yankee	4	5	0	4th	2	3	0	—	—
1967	1967	Walter Abbott	NCAA	College	Yankee	0	8	0	6th	0	5	0	—	—
1968	1968	Walter Abbott	NCAA	College	Yankee	3	5	0	T–3rd	2	3	0	—	—
1969	1969	Walter Abbott	NCAA	College	Yankee	5	4	0	T–2nd	3	2	0	—	—
1970	1970	Walter Abbott	NCAA	College	Yankee	3	5	0	5th	1	4	0	—	—
1971	1971	Walter Abbott	NCAA	College	Yankee	2	6	0	6th	1	4	0	—	—
1972	1972	Walter Abbott	NCAA	College	Yankee	3	6	0	5th	1	4	0	—	—
1973	1973	Walter Abbott	NCAA	Division II	Yankee	3	7	0	6th	2	4	0	—	—
1974	1974	Walter Abbott	NCAA	Division II	Yankee	4	6	0	T–1st	4	2	0	—	—
1975	1975	Walter Abbott	NCAA	Division II	Yankee	4	6	0	T–4th	1	4	0	—	—
1976	1976	Jack Bicknell	NCAA	Division II	Yankee	6	5	0	T–3rd	2	3	0	—	—
1977	1977	Jack Bicknell	NCAA	Division II	Yankee	3	7	0	T–4th	1	4	0	—	—
1978	1978	Jack Bicknell	NCAA	Division I-AA	Yankee	3	7	1	6th	0	4	1	—	—
1979	1979	Jack Bicknell	NCAA	Division I-AA	Yankee	2	9	0	T–5th	0	5	0	—	—
1980	1980	Jack Bicknell	NCAA	Division I-AA	Yankee	4	7	0	5th	1	4	0	—	—
1981	1981	Ron Rogerson	NCAA	Division I-AA	Yankee	3	7	1	6th	1	4	0	—	—
1982	1982	Ron Rogerson	NCAA	Division I-AA	Yankee	7	4	0	T–1st	3	2	0	—	—
1983	1983	Ron Rogerson	NCAA	Division I-AA	Yankee	4	6	0	6th	0	0	5	—	—
1984	1984	Ron Rogerson	NCAA	Division I-AA	Yankee	5	6	0	4th	2	3	0	—	—
1985	1985	Buddy Teevens	NCAA	Division I-AA	Yankee	6	5	0	T–3rd	2	3	0	—	—
1986	1986	Buddy Teevens	NCAA	Division I-AA	Yankee	7	4	0	T–5th	3	4	0	—	—
1987	1987	Tim Murphy	NCAA	Division I-AA	Yankee	8	4	0	T–1st	6	1	0	Lost NCAA Division I-AA First Round	#13
1988	1988	Tim Murphy	NCAA	Division I-AA	Yankee	7	4	0	T–3rd	4	4	0	—	—
1989	1989	Tom Lichtenberg	NCAA	Division I-AA	Yankee	9	3	0	T–1st	6	2	0	Lost NCAA Division I-AA First Round	#8
1990	1990	Kirk Ferentz	NCAA	Division I-AA	Yankee	3	8	0	T–7th	2	6	0	—	—
1991	1991	Kirk Ferentz	NCAA	Division I-AA	Yankee	3	8	0	T–7th	2	6	0	—	—
1992	1992	Kirk Ferentz	NCAA	Division I-AA	Yankee	6	5	0	T–5th	4	4	0	—	—
1993	1993	Jack Cosgrove	NCAA	Division I-AA	Yankee	0	11	0	12th	0	8	0	—	—
1994	1994	Jack Cosgrove	NCAA	Division I-AA	Yankee	3	8	0	T–8th	2	6	0	—	—
1995	1995	Jack Cosgrove	NCAA	Division I-AA	Yankee	3	8	0	T–11th	1	7	0	—	—
1996	1996	Jack Cosgrove	NCAA	Division I-AA	Yankee	7	4	0	T–5th	5	3	0	—	—
1997	1997	Jack Cosgrove	NCAA	Division I-AA	Yankee	5	6	0	T–5th	4	4	0	—	—
1998	1998	Jack Cosgrove	NCAA	Division I-AA	Yankee	6	5	0	T–7th	3	5	0	—	—
1999	1999	Jack Cosgrove	NCAA	Division I-AA	Atlantic 10	4	7	0	T–6th	3	5	0	—	—
2000	2000	Jack Cosgrove	NCAA	Division I-AA	Atlantic 10	5	6	0	T–7th	3	5	0	—	—
2001	2001	Jack Cosgrove	NCAA	Division I-AA	Atlantic 10	9	3	0	T–1st	7	2	0	Lost NCAA Division I-AA Quarterfinal	#10
2002	2002	Jack Cosgrove	NCAA	Division I-AA	Atlantic 10	11	3	0	T–1st	7	2	0	Lost NCAA Division I-AA Quarterfinal	#6
2003	2003	Jack Cosgrove	NCAA	Division I-AA	Atlantic 10	7	5	0	T–5th	5	4	0	—	—
2004	2004	Jack Cosgrove	NCAA	Division I-AA	Atlantic 10	5	6	0	T–6th	3	5	0	—	—
2005	2005	Jack Cosgrove	NCAA	Division I-AA	Atlantic 10	5	6	0	T–6th	3	5	0	—	—
2006	2006	Jack Cosgrove	NCAA	Division I FCS	Atlantic 10	6	5	0	T–2nd	5	3	0	—	—
2007	2007	Jack Cosgrove	NCAA	Division I FCS	CAA	4	7	0	8th	3	5	0	—	—
2008	2008	Jack Cosgrove	NCAA	Division I FCS	CAA	8	5	0	T–5th	5	3	0	Lost NCAA Division I FCS First Round	#18
2009	2009	Jack Cosgrove	NCAA	Division I FCS	CAA	5	6	0	T–5th	4	4	0	—	—
2010	2010	Jack Cosgrove	NCAA	Division I FCS	CAA	4	7	0	9th	3	5	0	—	—
2011	2011	Jack Cosgrove	NCAA	Division I FCS	CAA	9	4	0	T–2nd	6	2	0	Lost NCAA Division I FCS Quarterfinals	#13 / #13
2012	2012	Jack Cosgrove	NCAA	Division I FCS	CAA	5	6	0	7th	4	4	0	—	—
2013	2013	Jack Cosgrove	NCAA	Division I FCS	CAA	10	3	0	1st	7	2	0	Lost NCAA Division I FCS Second Round	#12 / #11
2014	2014	Jack Cosgrove	NCAA	Division I FCS	CAA	5	6	0	T–5th	4	4	0	—	—
2015	2015	Jack Cosgrove	NCAA	Division I FCS	CAA	3	8	0	T–8th	3	5	0	—	—
2016	2016	Joe Harasymiak	NCAA	Division I FCS	CAA	6	5	0	T–4th	5	3	0	—	—
2017	2017	Joe Harasymiak	NCAA	Division I FCS	CAA	4	6	0	T–7th	3	5	0	—	—
2018	2018	Joe Harasymiak	NCAA	Division I FCS	CAA	10	4	0	1st	7	1	0	Lost NCAA Division I FCS Semifinals	#4 / #5
2019	2019	Nick Charlton	NCAA	Division I FCS	CAA	6	6	0	T–5th	4	4	0	—	—
2020	2020	Nick Charlton	NCAA	Division I FCS	CAA	2	2	0	T–3rd	2	2	0	—	—
2021	2021	Nick Charlton	NCAA	Division I FCS	CAA	6	5	0	T–4th	4	4	0	—	—
2022	2022	Jordan Stevens	NCAA	Division I FCS	CAA	2	9	0	T–10th	2	6	0	—	—
2023	2023	Jordan Stevens	NCAA	Division I FCS	CAA	2	9	0	13th	1	7	0	—	—
2024	2024	Jordan Stevens	NCAA	Division I FCS	CAA	5	7	0	11th	3	5	0	—	—
2025	2025	Jordan Stevens	NCAA	Division I FCS	CAA	6	6	0	6th	5	3	0	—	—
