= List of Maine Black Bears head football coaches =

List of head football coaches for the Maine Black Bears

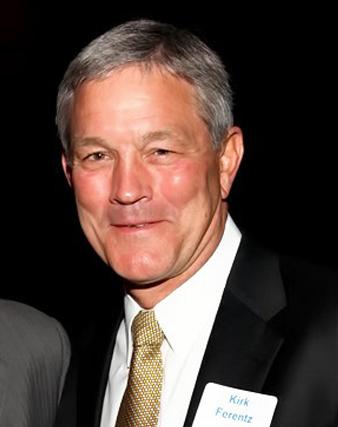
Kirk Ferentz was head coach at Maine from 1990 to 1992.

The Maine Black Bears college football team represents the University of Maine in the Coastal Athletic Association Football Conference (CAAFC), as part of the NCAA Division I Football Championship Subdivision. The program has had 37 head coaches since it began play during the 1892 season. Since December 2021, Jordan Stevens has served as head coach at Maine.

Five coaches have led Maine in postseason playoff or bowl games: Harold Westerman, Tim Murphy, Tom Lichtenberg, Jack Cosgrove, Joe Harasymiak. Eighteen coaches have won conference championships: Edward N. Robinson, Frank McCoy, Edgar Wingard, and Tommy Hughitt each had won one; John Wells Farley, Thomas J. Riley, and James A. Baldwin each won two; Harold Westerman won seven; and Fred Brice won nine as a member of the Maine Intercollegiate Athletic Association. George E. Allen and William C. Kenyon each won one and Brice won six as a member of the New England Conference. David M. Nelson, Walter Abbott, Ron Rogerson, Murphy, and Lichtenberg each won one, and Westerman won four as a member of the Yankee Conference. Cosgrove won two as a member of the Atlantic 10 Conference, and Cosgrove and Harasymiak each won one as a member of the Colonial Athletic Association.

Cosgrove is the leader in seasons coached, with 23 years as head coach and in games coached (263) and won (128). Riley has the highest winning percentage of those who have coached more than one game at 0.781. Chesley Johnston and Wildes Veazie have the lowest winning percentage of those who have coached more than one game, with 0.000. Of the 37 different head coaches who have led the Black Bears, Edward N. Robinson has been inducted into the College Football Hall of Fame.

== Key ==
Key to symbols in coaches list
General		Overall		Conference		Postseason (Note: Although the first Rose Bowl Game was played in 1902, it has been continuously played since the 1916 game, and is recognized as the oldest bowl game by the NCAA. "—" indicates any season prior to 1916 when postseason games were not played.)	
No.	Order of coaches (Note: A running total of the number of head coaches, with coaches who served separate tenures being counted only once. Interim head coaches are represented with "Int" and are not counted in the running total. "—" indicates the team played but either without a coach or no coach is on record. "X" indicates an interim year without play.)	GC	Games coached	CW	Conference wins	PW	Postseason wins
DC	Division championships	OW	Overall wins	CL	Conference losses	PL	Postseason losses
CC	Conference championships	OL	Overall losses	CT	Conference ties	PT	Postseason ties
NC	National championships	OT	Overall ties (Note: Overtime rules in college football were introduced in 1996, making ties impossible in the period since.)	C%	Conference winning percentage		
†	Elected to the College Football Hall of Fame	O%	Overall winning percentage (Note: When computing the win–loss percentage, a tie counts as half a win and half a loss.)				

== Coaches ==
List of head football coaches showing season(s) coached, overall records, conference records, postseason records, championships and selected awards (Note: Statistics correct as of the end of the 2025 NCAA Division I FCS football season.)
No.	Name (Note: Maine did not have a head coach during their 1894 season.)	Season(s)	GC	OW	OL	OT	O%	CW	CL	CT	C%	PW	PL	PT	DC	CC	NC	Awards
1	Chesley Johnston	1892	2	0	2	0	.000	–	–	–	–	–	–	–	–	–	0	–
2	Wildes Veazie	1893	5	0	5	0	.000	0	4	0	.000	–	–	–	–	0	0	–
3	P. Folsom	1895	5	1	4	0	0.200	0	4	0	.000	–	–	–	–	0	0	–
4	Jack Abbott	1896	6	1	3	2	0.333	1	3	1	0.300	–	–	–	–	0	0	–
5	Harry Orman Robinson	1897	3	1	2	0	0.333	0	2	0	.000	–	–	–	–	0	0	–
6	Jim Coombs	1898	5	1	4	0	0.200	0	4	0	.000	–	–	–	–	0	0	–
7	W. B. Hopkins	1899	5	2	3	0	0.400	2	3	0	0.400	–	–	–	–	0	0	–
8	Ernest Burton	1900	8	4	4	0	0.500	0	4	0	.000	–	–	–	–	0	0	–
9	John Wells Farley	1901; 1903	16	12	4	0	0.750	8	0	0	1.000	–	–	–	–	2	0	–
10	Edward N. Robinson^{†}	1902	8	6	2	0	0.750	3	1	0	0.750	–	–	–	–	1	0	–
11	Emmett O. King	1904	9	5	4	0	0.556	0	3	0	.000	–	–	–	–	0	0	–
12	Frank McCoy	1905–1908	32	12	15	5	0.453	5	4	3	0.542	–	–	–	–	1	0	–
13	George Schildmiller	1909	8	3	4	1	0.438	1	2	0	0.333	–	–	–	–	0	0	–
14	Edgar Wingard	1910–1911	16	11	3	2	0.750	3	2	1	0.583	–	–	–	–	1	0	–
15	Thomas J. Riley	1912–1913	16	12	3	1	0.781	6	0	0	1.000	–	–	–	–	2	0	–
16	Eddie Cochems	1914	9	6	3	0	0.667	2	1	0	0.667	–	–	–	–	0	0	–
17	Tommy Hughitt	1915–1916	16	6	7	3	0.469	3	1	2	0.667	–	–	–	–	1	0	–
18	Thomas A. McCann	1917	4	1	3	0	0.250	1	1	0	0.500	–	–	–	–	0	0	–
19	Donald R. Aldworth	1918	4	3	1	0	0.750	2	1	0	0.667	–	–	–	–	0	0	–
20	James A. Baldwin	1919–1920	16	9	4	1	0.679	5	0	1	0.917	–	–	–	–	2	0	–
21	Fred Brice (Note: The conference record for Brice in the New England Conference was 27–17–4 and was 36–19–5 in the Maine Intercollegiate Athletic Association.)	1921–1940	146	79	58	9	0.572	63	36	9	0.625	–	–	–	–	15	0	–
22	George E. Allen (Note: The conference record for Allen in the New England Conference was 2–1–1, 3–6 in the Yankee Conference, and 8–3–1 in the Maine Intercollegiate Athletic Association.)	1941; 1946–1948	28	15	11	2	0.571	13	10	2	0.560	–	–	–	–	1	0	–
23	William C. Kenyon (Note: The conference record for Allen in the New England Conference was 1–6 and 8–2–1 in the Maine Intercollegiate Athletic Association.)	1942; 1944–1945	15	4	11	0	0.267	3	7	0	0.300	–	–	–	–	1	0	–
24	Samuel Sezak	1943	1	0	1	0	.000	0	0	0	–	–	–	–	–	0	0	–
25	David M. Nelson (Note: The conference record for Nelson in the Yankee Conference was 5–1–1 and 2–3–1 in the Maine Intercollegiate Athletic Association.)	1949–1950	14	7	5	2	0.571	7	4	2	0.615	–	–	–	–	1	0	–
26	Harold Westerman (Note: The conference record for Westerman in the Yankee Conference was 41–26–5 and 32–8–2 in the Maine Intercollegiate Athletic Association.)	1951–1966	124	80	38	7	0.668	73	34	7	0.671	0	1	0	–	11	0	–
27	Walter Abbott	1967–1975	80	27	53	0	0.338	15	32	0	0.319	0	0	0	–	1	0	–
28	Jack Bicknell	1976–1980	54	18	35	1	0.343	4	20	1	0.180	0	0	0	–	0	0	–
29	Ron Rogerson	1981–1984	43	19	23	1	0.453	6	14	0	0.300	0	0	0	–	1	0	–
30	Buddy Teevens	1985–1986	22	13	9	0	0.591	5	7	0	0.417	0	0	0	–	0	0	–
31	Tim Murphy	1987–1988	23	15	8	0	0.652	10	5	0	0.667	0	1	0	–	1	0	–
32	Tom Lichtenberg	1989	12	9	3	0	0.750	6	2	0	0.750	0	1	0	–	1	0	–
33	Kirk Ferentz	1990–1992	33	12	21	0	0.364	8	16	0	0.333	0	0	0	–	0	0	–
34	Jack Cosgrove	1993–2015	263	128	135	0	0.487	89	97	0	0.478	3	5	0	–	3	0	–
35	Joe Harasymiak	2016–2018	35	20	15	–	0.571	15	9	–	0.625	2	1	–	–	1	0	–
36	Nick Charlton	2019–2021	27	14	13	–	0.519	10	10	–	0.500	0	0	–	–	0	0	–
37	Jordan Stevens	2022–present	46	15	31	–	0.326	11	21	–	0.344	0	0	–	–	0	0	–
