= 1893 Colgate football team =

American college football season

1893 Colgate football
- Conference: Independent
- Record: 3–0–2
- Head coach: L. Jay Caldwell (1st season)
- Captain: L. Jay Caldwell

1893 Eastern college football independents records
	Conf.			Overall
Team	W	L	T	W		L		T
Princeton		–		11	–	0	–	0
Fordham		–		4	–	0	–	0
Harvard		–		12	–	1	–	0
Yale		–		10	–	1	–	0
Colgate		–		3	–	0	–	2
Penn		–		12	–	3	–	0
Penn State		–		4	–	1	–	0
Wesleyan		–		4	–	1	–	0
Holy Ghost		–		6	–	2	–	0
Swarthmore		–		6	–	2	–	1
Lehigh		–		7	–	3	–	0
Brown		–		6	–	3	–	0
Carlisle		–		2	–	1	–	0
Franklin & Marshall		–		4	–	2	–	1
Navy		–		5	–	3	–	0
Washington & Jefferson		–		5	–	3	–	0
Drexel		–		3	–	2	–	0
Bucknell		–		4	–	3	–	0
Boston College		–		3	–	3	–	0
Geneva		–		2	–	2	–	1
Army		–		4	–	5	–	0
Tufts		–		4	–	7	–	0
Cornell		–		3	–	6	–	1
Worcester Tech		–		2	–	4	–	1
Boston University		–		1	–	2	–	0
Lafayette		–		3	–	6	–	0
Syracuse		–		4	–	9	–	1
Western Penn		–		1	–	4	–	0
MIT		–		1	–	5	–	0
Massachusetts		–		1	–	9	–	0
New Hampshire		–		0	–	1	–	0
Rutgers		–		0	–	4	–	0
Maine		–		0	–	5	–	0

The 1893 Colgate football team represented Colgate University in the 1893 college football season. Colgate reports the record for the season as 3–0–1, however, there was a previously unreported game against Hamilton that ended in dispute. The Hamilton team left the field in the second half over a dispute about eligible players.

== Schedule ==
Date	Opponent	Site	Result	Attendance
October 19	at Hamilton	Clinton, NY	T 0–0	
October 26	Syracuse	Hamilton, NY (rivalry)	W 58–0	
November 1	Yale Law School*	Hamilton, NY	T 6–6	
November 6	at Union (NY)	Schenectady, NY	W 10–6	800
November 30	at Syracuse A.A.	Syracuse, NY	W 12–0	2,500
*Non-conference game
