= Thomas McCann =

Thomas McCann is the name of:

- Thomas A. McCann, head football coach at Bowdoin College (1913–1914) and the University of Maine (1917)
- Tom McCann (1898–1975), head football coach at Tusculum College (1924) and the University of Miami (1931–1934)
- Thomas McCann, Scottish golfer, for whom the shoe brand Thom McAn is named
