= Sunday roast =

British dish of meat and vegetables

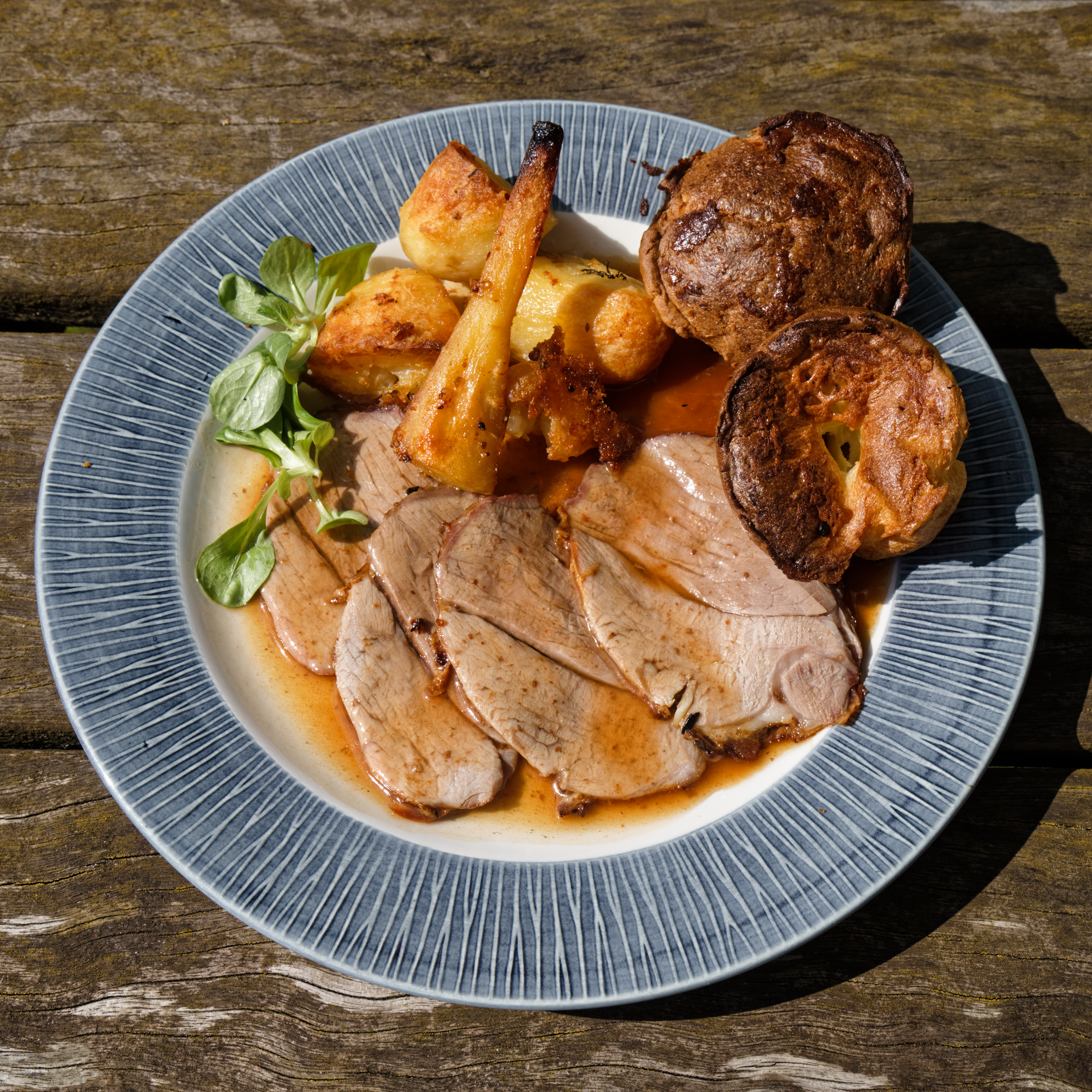
- A Sunday roast consisting of roast lamb, Yorkshire puddings, roast potatoes and parsnips on a bed of gravy
- Course: Main course
- Place of origin: United Kingdom
- Region or state: Western Europe
- Main ingredients: Roast meat

A Sunday roast or roast dinner is a British dish traditionally eaten on Sunday. It consists of roast meat, roast or mashed potatoes, and accompaniments such as Yorkshire pudding, gravy and stuffing, and may include condiments such as apple sauce, mint sauce, redcurrant sauce, mustard, cranberry sauce or horseradish sauce. A range of vegetables can be served, such as broccoli, Brussels sprouts, cabbage, carrots, cauliflower, parsnips or peas, which can be boiled, steamed or roasted alongside the meat and potatoes. Other names for this meal include Sunday lunch, Sunday dinner, roast dinner and full roast. The meal is often described as a less grand version of a traditional Christmas dinner.

Besides being served in its original homeland, the tradition of a Sunday roast lunch or dinner has been a major influence on food cultures in the English-speaking world, particularly in Australia, Ireland, Canada, South Africa, and New Zealand. A South African Sunday roast normally comprises roast pork, beef, lamb or chicken, roast potatoes or mashed potato, and various vegetables such as cauliflower cheese, creamed spinach, green beans, carrots, peas, beetroot and sweet potato. It is also fairly common to serve rice and gravy or pap and tomato gravy in South Africa instead of Yorkshire pudding.

== Origin ==
The Sunday roast originated in Britain as a meal to be eaten after the church service on Sunday. Eating a large meal following church services is common to most of Europe, but the Sunday roast variant developed as unique to Britain. On Sundays all types of meat and dairy produce are allowed to be eaten; this is unlike Fridays, when many Christians of the Roman Catholic, Anglican and Methodist denominations traditionally abstain from eating meats and instead eat fish. Likewise, it is traditional for Anglicans and English Catholics to fast before Sunday services, with a larger meal to break the fast afterwards. These Christian religious rules created several traditional dishes in Britain.

- Only eating fish on Friday resulted in a British tradition of 'fish Fridays', which is still common in fish and chip shops and restaurants across Britain on Fridays; particularly during Lent.
- To mark the end of not being able to eat meat, the Sunday roast was created as a mark of celebration.

The modern Sunday roast may originate in the late 1700s, during the Industrial Revolution in Britain. Middle-class families would place a cut of meat into the oven as they got ready for church. They would then add in vegetables such as potatoes, turnips and parsnips before going to church on a Sunday morning. When they returned from the church, the dinner was all but ready. The juices from the meat and vegetables were used to make a stock or gravy to pour on top of the dinner. Less well-off families would bring their meal to the local bakery, where private dishes could be cooked when the ovens (for a small fee) were not needed for bread.

== Typical elements ==
=== Meat ===
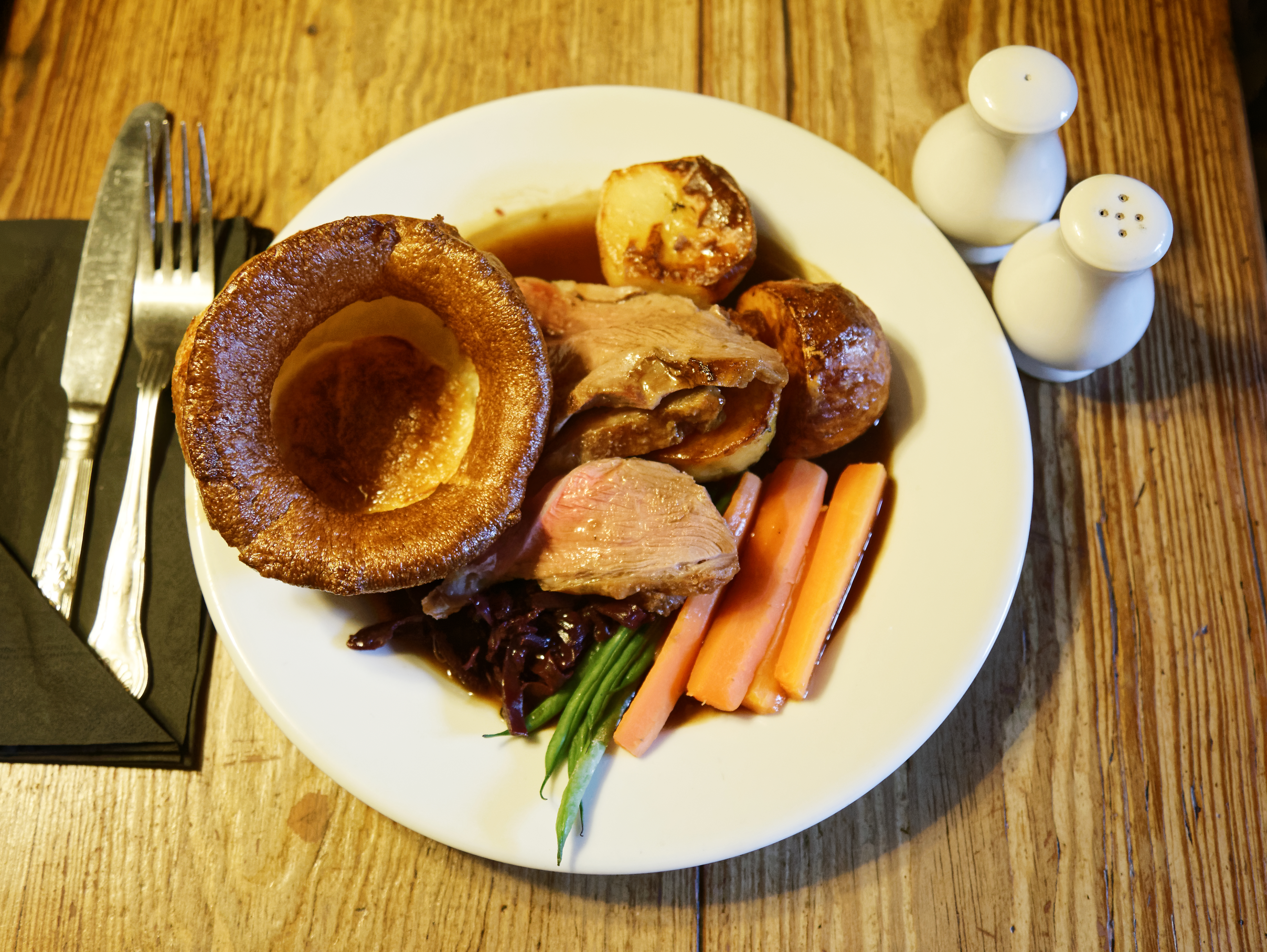
A Sunday roast with roast lamb, roast potatoes, carrots, green beans, braised red cabbage and Yorkshire pudding on a bed of gravy

Typical meats used for a Sunday roast are chicken, lamb, pork or roast beef, although seasonally duck, goose, gammon, turkey or (rarely) other game birds may be used.

=== Vegetables ===
Sunday roasts can be served with a range of boiled, steamed and/or roast vegetables. The vegetables served vary seasonally and regionally, but will usually include roast potatoes, roasted in meat dripping or vegetable oil, and also gravy made from juices released by the roasting meat, perhaps supplemented by one or more stock cubes, gravy browning/thickening, roux or cornflour.

The potatoes can be cooked around the meat itself, absorbing the juices and fat directly (as in a traditional Cornish under-roast). However, many cooks prefer to cook the potatoes and the Yorkshire pudding in a hotter oven than that used for the joint and so remove the meat beforehand to rest and "settle" in a warm place.

Other vegetables served with roast dinner can include mashed swede or turnips, roast parsnips, boiled or steamed cabbage, broccoli, green beans, and boiled carrots and peas. It is also not uncommon for vegetable dishes such as cauliflower cheese and stewed red cabbage to be served alongside the more usual assortment of plainly-cooked seasonal vegetables.

=== Accompaniments ===
Common traditional accompaniments include:

- beef: Yorkshire pudding, suet pudding; English mustard, gravy or horseradish sauce. Roast beef with Yorkshire pudding accompanied by "roast potatoes, vegetables, and horseradish sauce" is considered by National Geographic as the national dish of England.
- pork: crackling and sage-and-onion stuffing; apple sauce or English mustard.
- lamb: mint sauce or redcurrant jelly.
- chicken: sausages or sausage meat, stuffing, bread sauce, apple sauce, cranberry sauce or redcurrant jelly.

== See also ==
- Carvery
- Pub grub
- Pot roast
