= 1912 Maine Elephants football team =

American college football season

1912 Maine Elephants football
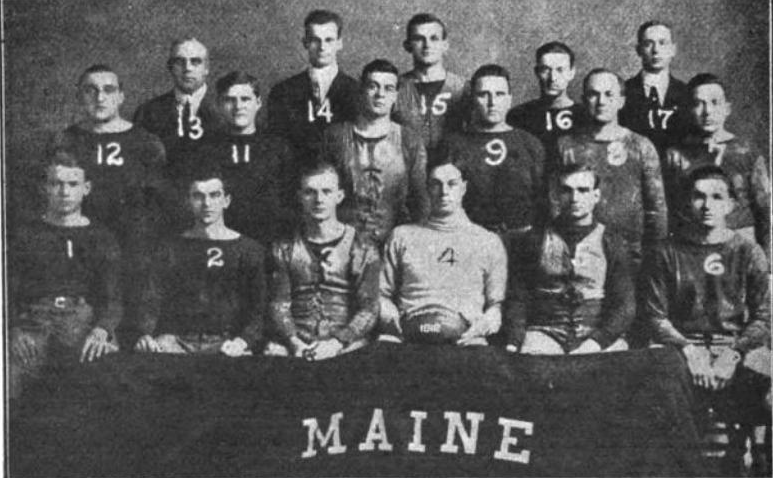

MIAA champion
- Conference: Maine Intercollegiate Athletic Association
- Record: 7–1 (3–0 MIAA)
- Head coach: Thomas J. Riley (1st season)
- Captain: Thomas Shepard
- Home stadium: Alumni Field

The 1912 Maine Elephants football team was an American football team that represented the University of Maine as an independent during the 1912 college football season. The team compiled a 7–1 record and shut out six of its eight opponents. Its only setback was a 7–0 loss on the road against national champion, Harvard. Thomas J. Riley was the coach, and Thomas Shepard was the team captain.

== Schedule ==
Date	Opponent	Site	Result	Attendance	Source
September 21	Fort McKinley*	Alumni Field; Orono, ME	W 34–0		
September 28	at Harvard*	Harvard Stadium; Boston, MA	L 0–7		
October 5	Tufts*	Alumni Field; Orono, ME	W 14–0		
October 12	Rhode Island State*	Alumni Field; Orono, ME	W 18–0		
October 19	Saint Anselm*	Alumni Field; Orono, ME	W 16–0		
October 26	at Bates	Lewiston, ME	W 7–6		
November 2	at Colby	Waterville, ME	W 20–0		
November 9	Bowdoin	Alumni Field; Orono, ME	W 17–0	3,000	
*Non-conference game
