= Thomas J. Riley =

American football player, coach, and attorney (1885–1928)

Biographical details
- Born: January 20, 1885; Escanaba, Michigan, U.S.
- Died: March 15, 1928 (aged 43); Escanaba, Michigan, U.S.

Playing career
- 1908: Michigan
- Position: Guard

Coaching career (HC unless noted)
- 1910–1911: Maine (assistant)
- 1912–1913: Maine
- 1914–1916: Amherst

Head coaching record
- Overall: 21–15–4

Accomplishments and honors

Championships
- 2 Maine Intercollegiate Athletic Association (1912–1913); 1 Little Three (1915)

Thomas James Riley (January 30, 1885 – March 15, 1928) was an American football player and coach and attorney. He played football for the University of Michigan and coached football for the University of Maine (1910–1913) and Amherst College (1914–1916).

== Early years ==
Riley was born in Escanaba, Michigan in 1885. His father, Nicholas J. Riley (1855–1900), was born in Ireland, and his mother, Anna (McNamara) Riley (1859–1929), was a Wisconsin native. At the time of the 1900 United States census, Riley was living with his mother and two brothers (John and William) in Escanaba.

== University of Michigan ==
He played as a guard for the University of Michigan's 1908 football team. He won a reputation as a strong player based on his performance in the 1908 Penn game. He graduated from the University of Michigan Law School in 1910, was admitted to the Michigan Bar in September 1910, and became associated with the firm of Rushton & Riley in Escanaba, Michigan.

== Coaching career ==
Riley was the assistant coach of the University of Maine's football team in 1910. That year, Maine tied for the Maine Intercollegiate Athletic Association (MIAA) championship. In November 1911, Maine head coach Edgar Wingard announced that he would not act as head coach of the football any longer and would instead give all of his time to the general direction of athletics. On November 21, 1911, the University of Maine Athletic Association announced that Riley had been hired as the new head football coach. The Lewiston Daily Sun reported on Riley's hiring as follows:

Reilly [sic] is a man of experience. He played end on the University of Michigan and was the choice for that position on the All-America team. His work at Maine has been largely responsible for the success of the team.

Riley served as the head coach at Maine from 1912 to 1913. He led the Maine football team to consecutive MIAA championships.

In March 1914, Riley was hired as the head football coach at Amherst College. He held that job from 1914 to 1916. In his first year at Amherst, he led the team to a 5–3 record, including a victory over rival Williams by the greatest margin in 16 years. In November 1915, Riley signed a contract to coach at Amherst for another two years.

== Family and later years ==
In February 1915, Riley married Janet Chaplin, a graduate of the University of Maine, in a ceremony held at Bangor, Maine. From 1915 to 1916, Riley was the Assistant Prosecuting Attorney in Delta County, Michigan. He served as the mayor of Escanaba in 1917. In a draft registration card completed by Riley in September 1918, he indicated that he was employed as a lawyer in Escanaba and that he was living at 304 Elmore in Escanaba with his wife, Janet Chaplin Riley. At the time of the 1920 United States census, Riley was living in Escanaba with his wife and was working as an attorney. Riley died in March 1928 at Escanaba.

== Head coaching record ==
Year	Team	Overall	Conference	Standing	Bowl/playoffs
Maine Elephants (Maine Intercollegiate Athletic Association) (1912–1913)
1912	Maine	7–1	3–0	1st	
1913	Maine	5–2–1	3–0	1st	
Maine:		12–3–1	6–0		
Amherst (Little Three) (1914–1916)
1914	Amherst	2–3–3			
1915	Amherst	6–3		1st	
1916	Amherst	1–6			
Amherst:		9–12–3			
Total:		21–15–4			
National championship Conference title Conference division title or championship game berth
