= Maine Elephants football, 1900–1909 =

American college football seasons

The Maine Elephants football program from 1900 to 1909 represented the University of Maine in its second decade of intercollegiate football.

== 1900 ==
1900 Maine football
- Conference: Maine Intercollegiate Athletic Association
- Record: 4–4 (0–4 MIAA)
- Head coach: Ernest Burton (1st season)
- Captain: Ralph Wormell

The 1900 Maine football team was an American football team that represented the University of Maine during the 1900 college football season. In its first and only season under head coach Ernest Burton, the team compiled a 4–4 record. Ralph Wormell was the team captain.

=== Schedule ===
Date	Opponent	Site	Result
	Edward Little*		W 22–0
	Fort Preble*		W 16–0
	Colby		L 0–5
	Fort Preble*		W 29–0
	Bates		L 0–26
	Colby		W 18–0
	Bowdoin		L 0–38
*Non-conference game

== 1901 ==
1901 Maine football

MIAA champion
- Conference: Maine Intercollegiate Athletic Association
- Record: 7–1 (5–0 MIAA)
- Head coach: John Wells Farley (1st season)
- Captain: Carlos Dorticos

The 1901 Maine football team was an American football team that represented the University of Maine during the 1901 college football season. In its first season under head coach John Wells Farley, the team compiled a 7–1 record. Carlos Dorticos was the team captain.

=== Schedule ===
Date	Opponent	Site	Result
	Bar Harbor*		W 5–0
	Bar Harbor*		W 5–0
	Colby		W 12–0
	Bates		W 6–0
	Bates		W 17–0
	Tufts*		L 5–18
	Colby		W 29–0
	Bowdoin		W 22–5
*Non-conference game

== 1902 ==
1902 Maine football

MIAA champion
- Conference: Maine Intercollegiate Athletic Association
- Record: 6–2 (3–1 MIAA)
- Head coach: Edward N. Robinson (1st season)
- Captain: Carlos Dorticos

The 1902 Maine football team was an American football team that represented the University of Maine during the 1902 college football season. In its first and only season under head coach Edward N. Robinson, the team compiled a 6–2 record. Carlos Dorticos was the team captain.

=== Schedule ===
Date	Opponent	Site	Result	Attendance	Source
	Bar Harbor*		W 18–0		
	EMCS*		W 30–0		
	Colby		W 6–0		
October 11	Harvard*	Soldiers' Field; Boston, MA	L 0–23	> 5,000	
	Tufts*		W 12–0		
	Bates		L 0–6		
	Colby		W 17–5		
	Bowdoin		W 11–0		
*Non-conference game

== 1903 ==
1903 Maine Elephants football

MIAA champion
- Conference: Maine Intercollegiate Athletic Association
- Record: 5–3 (3–0 MIAA)
- Head coach: John Wells Farley (2nd season)
- Captain: Charles Bailey

The 1903 Maine Elephants football team was an American football team that represented the University of Maine during the 1903 college football season. In its second and final season under head coach John Wells Farley, the team compiled a 5–3 record. Charles Bailey was the team captain.

=== Schedule ===
Date	Time	Opponent	Site	Result	Source
September 26		New Hampshire*	Orono, ME (rivalry)	W 10–0	
October 3	3:00 p.m.	at Harvard*	Soldiers' Field; Boston, MA	L 0–6	
October 17		Colby	Orono, ME	W 6–5	
October 24		at New Hampshire*	Dover, NH (rivalry)	W 27–0	
October 31		at Bowdoin	Brunswick, ME	W 16–0	
November 9		Bates	Orono, ME	W 16–0	
November 14		vs. Holy Cross*	Maplewood Park; Bangor, ME	L 0–5	
November 20		at Tufts*	Medford, MA	L 6–11	
*Non-conference game

== 1904 ==
1904 Maine Elephants football
- Conference: Maine Intercollegiate Athletic Association
- Record: 3–4 (0–3 MIAA)
- Head coach: Emmett O. King (1st season)
- Captain: Charles Bailey

The 1904 Maine Elephants football team was an American football team that represented the University of Maine during the 1904 college football season. In its first and only season under head coach Emmett O. King, the team compiled a 3–4 record. Charles Bailey was the team captain.

=== Schedule ===
Date	Opponent	Site	Result	Source
	Maine Central Institute*	Orono, ME	W 23–0	
October 1	at Brown*	Andrews Field; Providence, RI	W 6–0	
October 8	at Harvard*	Harvard Stadium; Boston, MA	L 0–23	
October 15	New Hampshire*	Orono, ME (rivalry)	W 6–0	
October 22	at Bates	Lewiston, ME	L 0–6	
October 29	Colby	Orono, ME	L 11–12	
November 5	Bowdoin	Orono, ME	L 5–22	
November 12	vs. Tufts*	Bangor, ME	L 0–6	
*Non-conference game

== 1905 ==
1905 Maine Elephants football

MIAA champion
- Conference: Maine Intercollegiate Athletic Association
- Record: 3–3–1 (2–0–1 MIAA)
- Head coach: Frank McCoy (1st season)
- Captain: Arthur Bennett

The 1905 Maine Elephants football team was an American football team that represented the University of Maine during the 1905 college football season. In its first season under head coach Frank McCoy, the team compiled a 3–3–1 record. Arthur Bennett was the team captain.

=== Schedule ===
Date	Opponent	Site	Result	Source
September 30	Kents Hill*	Orono, ME	W 22–0	
October 7	at Harvard*	Harvard Stadium; Boston, MA	L 0–22	
October 14	at Brown*	Andrews Field; Providence, RI	L 0–34	
October 21	Colby	Orono, ME	W 16–0	
October 28	New Hampshire*	Orono, ME (rivalry)	W 12–0	
November 4	Bates	Orono, ME	T 0–0	
November 11	at Tufts*	Medford, MA	L 0–12	
November 18	at Bowdoin	Brunswick, ME	W 18–0	
*Non-conference game

== 1906 ==
1906 Maine Elephants football
- Conference: Maine Intercollegiate Athletic Association
- Record: 2–4–2 (1–1–1 MIAA)
- Head coach: Frank McCoy (2nd season)
- Captain: John Burleigh

The 1906 Maine Elephants football team was an American football team that represented the University of Maine during the 1906 college football season. In its second season under head coach Frank McCoy, the team compiled a 2–4–2 record. John Burleigh was the team captain.

=== Schedule ===
Date	Opponent	Site	Result	Source
September 22	New Hampshire*	Orono, ME (rivalry)	W 7–0	
October 3	at Harvard*	Harvard Stadium; Boston, MA	L 0–17	
October 13	at Dartmouth*	Alumni Oval; Hanover, NH	L 0–4	
October 20	vs. Holy Cross*	Pine Tree Park; Portland, ME	T 0–0	
October 27	Tufts*	Orono, ME	L 0–6	
November 3	at Colby	Waterville, ME	W 8–0	
November 10	at Bates	Lewiston, ME	T 0–0	
November 17	Bowdoin	Orono, ME	L 0–6	
*Non-conference game

== 1907 ==
1907 Maine Elephants football
- Conference: Maine Intercollegiate Athletic Association
- Record: 2–4–2 (1–1–1 MIAA)
- Head coach: Frank McCoy (3rd season)
- Captain: Harrison Higgins

The 1907 Maine Elephants football team was an American football team that represented the University of Maine during the 1907 college football season. In its third season under head coach Frank McCoy, the team compiled a 2–4–2 record. Harrison Higgins was the team captain.

=== Schedule ===
Date	Opponent	Site	Result	Source
	Hebron Academy*	Orono, ME	T 0–0	
October 5	at Harvard*	Harvard Stadium; Boston, MA	L 0–30	
October 12	at Brown*	Andrews Field; Providence, RI	L 0–40	
October 19	vs. Dartmouth*	Portland, ME	L 0–27	
October 26	at Tufts*	Medford, MA	W 4–0	
November 2	Bates	Orono, ME	T 6–6	
November 9	Colby	Orono, ME	W 8–0	
November 16	at Bowdoin	Brunswick, ME	L 5–34	
*Non-conference game

== 1908 ==
1908 Maine Elephants football
- Conference: Maine Intercollegiate Athletic Association
- Record: 4–4 (1–2 MIAA)
- Head coach: Frank McCoy (4th season)
- Captain: Harry White

The 1908 Maine Elephants football team was an American football team that represented the University of Maine during the 1908 college football season. In its fourth and final season under head coach Frank McCoy, the team compiled a 3–4 record. Harry White was the team captain.

=== Schedule ===
Date	Opponent	Site	Result	Attendance	Source
September 26	Ricker College*	Orono, ME	W 37–0		
October 3	at Harvard*	Harvard Stadium; Boston, MA	L 0–16	> 10,000	
October 10	Fort McKinley*	Orono, ME	W 36–0		
October 17	New Hampshire*	Orono, ME (rivalry)	W 6–4		
October 24	Tufts*	Orono, ME	L 5–23		
October 31	at Bates	Lewiston, ME	W 6–0		
November 7	at Colby	Waterville, ME	L 5–16		
November 14	Bowdoin	Orono, ME	L 0–10		
*Non-conference game

== 1909 ==
1909 Maine Elephants football
- Conference: Maine Intercollegiate Athletic Association
- Record: 3–4–1 (1–2 MIAA)
- Head coach: George Schildmiller (1st season)
- Captain: Horace Cook

The 1909 Maine Elephants football team was an American football team that represented the University of Maine during the 1909 college football season. In its first season under head coach George Schildmiller, the team compiled a 3–4–1 record. Horace Cook was the team captain.

=== Schedule ===
Date	Opponent	Site	Result	Source
September 25	at Massachusetts*	Alumni Field; Amherst, MA	T 0–0	
October 2	Fort McKinley*	Orono, ME	W 16–0	
October 9	New Hampshire	Orono, ME (rivalry)	W 16–0	
October 16	at Harvard*	Harvard Stadium; Boston, MA	L 0–17	
October 23	at Tufts*	Medford, MA	L 0–9	
October 30	Bates	Orono, ME	W 15–6	
November 6	Colby	Orono, ME	L 6–17	
November 13	at Bowdoin	Brunswick, ME	L 0–22	
*Non-conference game
