= Marcus Urann =

Cranberry executive (1873–1963)

Marcus Libby Urann (October 1873 – April 4, 1963), known as "Mr. Cranberry", was the captain of the University of Maine's 1893 football team, one of the founders of Phi Kappa Phi honorary fraternity, a lawyer, a cranberry farmer, one of the founders of Ocean Spray cooperative, a cranberry entrepreneur and executive, and the first commercial producer or inventor of canned cranberry sauce.

== Career ==
In 1912 Urann experimented making cranberry sauce in his farm's packing house and began production for the local Massachusetts market. He later founded and ran his own company to produce the sauce, and began marketing it under the name Ocean Spray. After he helped found the agricultural cooperative that became known as Ocean Spray, the cooperative gradually began using the name. Canned cranberry sauce was first distributed nationally in 1941 by the cooperative. Urann was president of the newly formed cooperative from 1930 until 1954. His nephew Marcus M. Urann also became a cranberry executive.
