= 1917 Maine Black Bears football team =

American college football season

1917 Maine Black Bears football
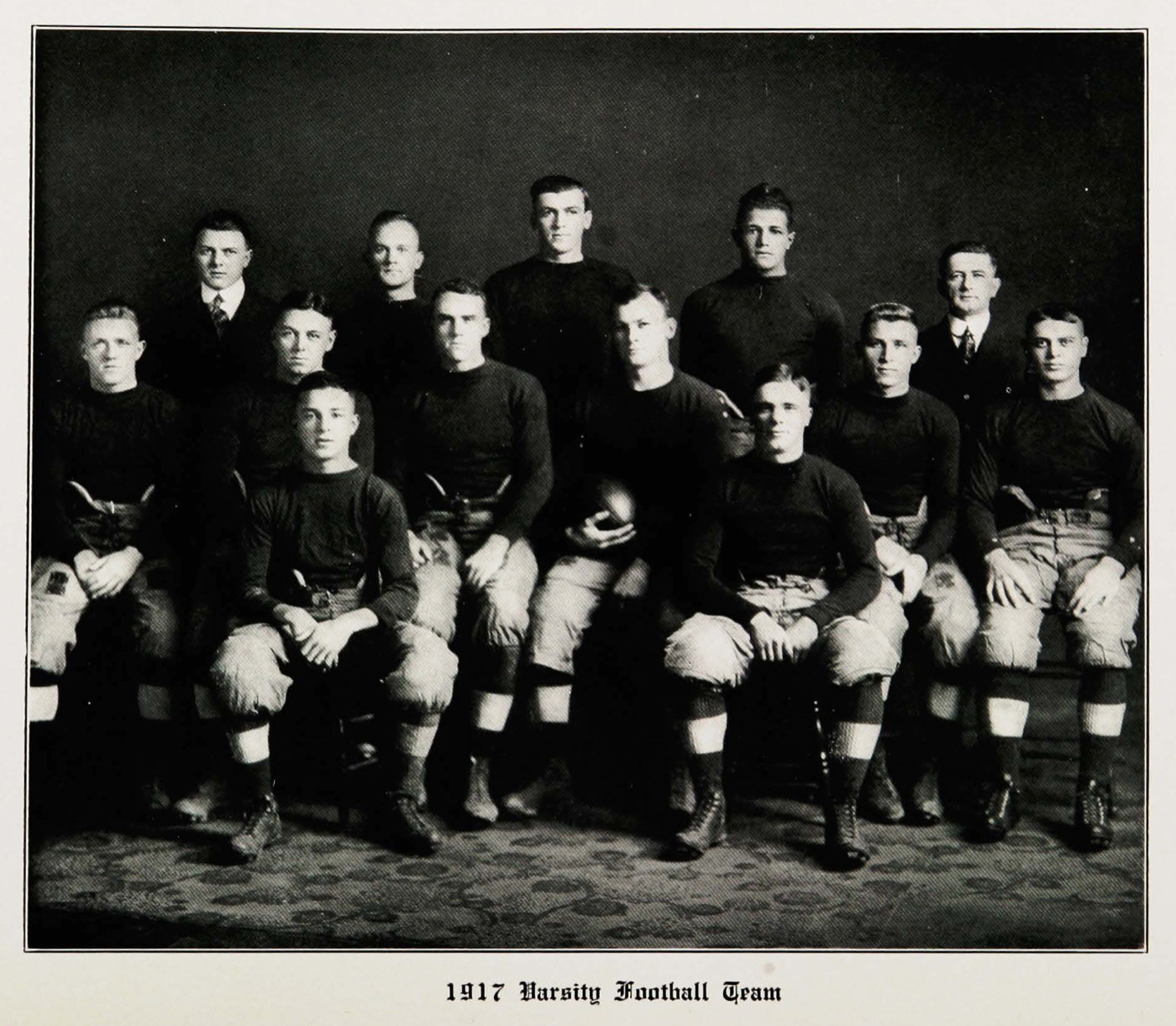
- Conference: Maine Intercollegiate Athletic Association
- Record: 1–3 (1–1 MIAA)
- Head coach: Thomas A. McCann (1st season)
- Captain: Thomas Davis
- Home stadium: Alumni Field

The 1917 Maine Black Bears football team was an American football team that represented the University of Maine during the 1917 college football season. In its first and only season under head coach Thomas A. McCann, the team compiled a 1–3 record. Thomas Davis was the team captain.

== Schedule ==
| Date | Opponent | Site | Result | Attendance | Source |
|---|---|---|---|---|---|
| October 13 | Maine Heavy Field Artillery* | Alumni Field; Orono, ME | L 6–27 | | |
| October 20 | Bates | Alumni Field; Orono, ME | L 0–6 | | |
| November 3 | at Bowdoin | Whittier Field; Brunswick, ME | W 14–0 | | |
| November 10 | at New Hampshire* | Central Park; Dover, NH (rivalry) | L 0–27 | 2,000+ | |
*Non-conference game
