= 1910 Maine Elephants football team =

American college football season

1910 Maine Elephants football
- Conference: Maine Intercollegiate Athletic Association
- Record: 4–1–2 (1–1–1 MIAA)
- Head coach: Edgar Wingard (1st season)
- Captain: William Parker

The 1910 Maine Elephants football team was an American football team that represented the University of Maine during the 1910 college football season. The team compiled a 4–1–2 record. William Parker was the team captain.

== Schedule ==
Date	Opponent	Site	Result	Source
September 24	Bangor High (exhibition)*	Orono, ME	W 6–0	
October 1	Fort McKinley*	Orono, ME	W 16–0	
October 8	at Vermont*	Centennial Field; Burlington, VT	T 0–0	
October 15	Tufts*	Orono, ME	W 14–6	
October 22	Massachusetts*	Orono, ME	W 29–2	
October 29	at Bates	Lewiston, ME	L 0–10	
November 5	at Colby	Waterville, ME	W 6–0	
November 12	Bowdoin	Orono, ME	T 0–0	
*Non-conference game
