= Redcurrant sauce =

English condiment

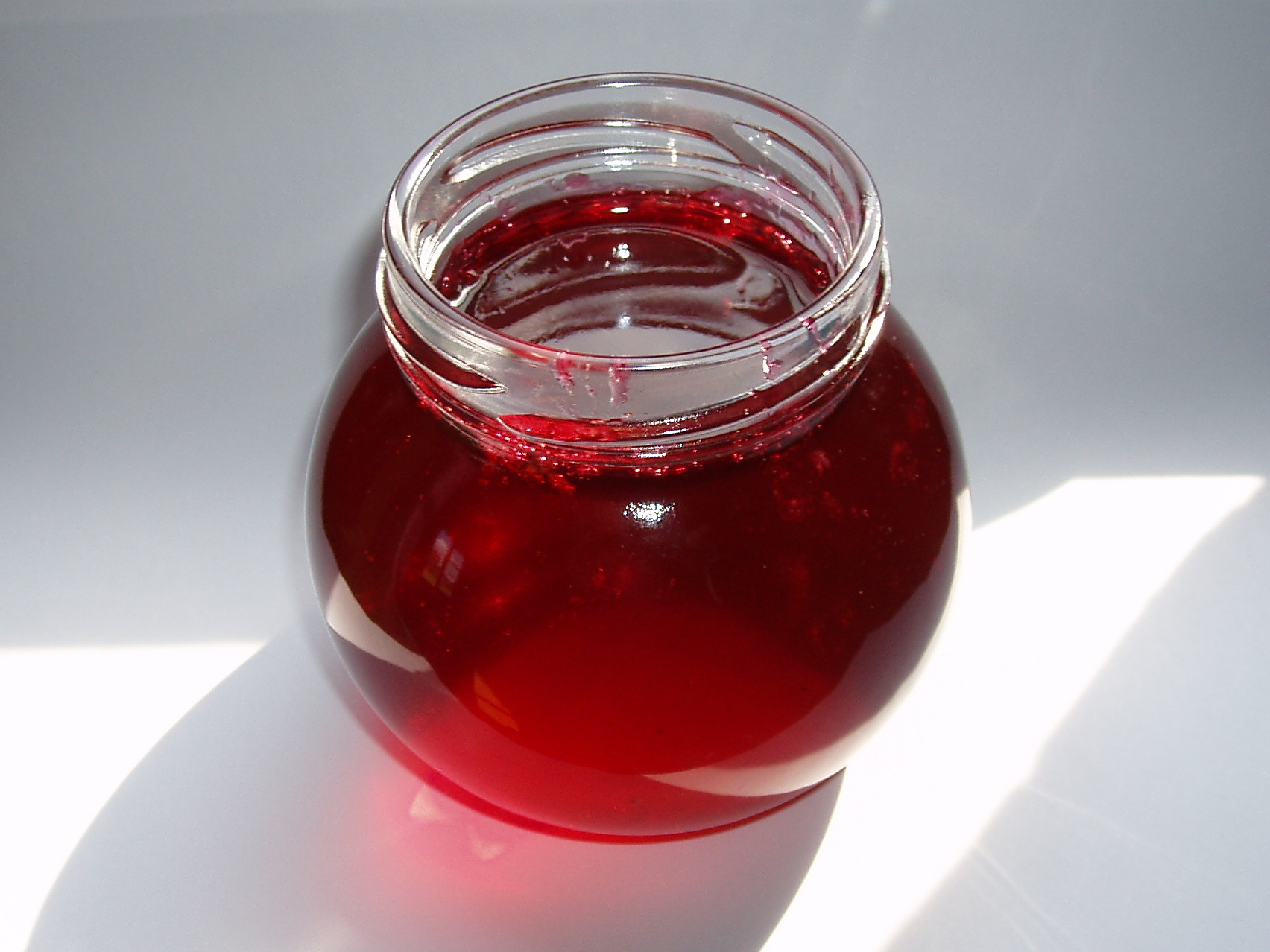
- A jar of redcurrant sauce
- Alternative names: Redcurrant jelly
- Type: Sauce
- Place of origin: England
- Associated cuisine: English cuisine
- Main ingredients: Redcurrants; sugar; rosemary; fruit pectin
- Ingredients generally used: Wine; red; white; port; mustard; zest; lemon; orange; shallots

Redcurrant sauce, also known as redcurrant jelly, is an English condiment, consisting of redcurrants, sugar, and rosemary, as well as fruit pectin. Some recipes include additional ingredients, such as red, white, or port wine; mustard; lemon or orange zest; and very occasionally shallots.

The sauce is traditionally eaten as part of a Sunday roast, particularly with roast lamb, goose, or turkey, and is an integral part of Christmas dinner in Britain. It is also a popular accompaniment to all types of game. It is similar to, if somewhat simpler than, Cumberland and Oxford sauces that have port wine added to their constituents.

== See also ==
- Cranberry sauce
- List of sauces
