= 1918 Maine Black Bears football team =

American college football season

1918 Maine Black Bears football
- Conference: Maine Intercollegiate Athletic Association
- Record: 3–1 (2–1 MIAA)
- Head coach: Donald R. Aldworth (1st season)
- Captain: George Ginsburg
- Home stadium: Alumni Field

The 1918 Maine Black Bears football team was an American football team that represented the University of Maine during the 1918 college football season. In its first and only season under head coach Donald R. Aldworth, the team compiled a 3–1 record. George Ginsburg was the team captain.

== Schedule ==
| Date | Opponent | Site | Result | Source |
|---|---|---|---|---|
| October 19 | Portland Naval Reserves (practice)* | Alumni Field; Orono, ME | T 14–14 | |
| October 26 | Bates | Alumni Field; Orono, ME | W 6–0 | |
| October 26 | Bangor High School* | Alumni Field; Orono, ME | W 6–0 | |
| November 2 | at Bowdoin | Whittier Field; Brunswick, ME | L 0–7 | |
| November 9 | Colby | Alumni Field; Orono, ME | W 9–3 | |
*Non-conference game
