= 1911 Maine Elephants football team =

American college football season

1911 Maine Elephants football

MIAA champion
- Conference: Maine Intercollegiate Athletic Association
- Record: 6–2 (2–1 MIAA)
- Head coach: Edgar Wingard (2nd season)
- Captain: William Parker

The 1911 Maine Elephants football team was an American football team that represented the University of Maine during the 1911 college football season. The team compiled a 6–2 record. William Parker was the team captain.

== Schedule ==
Date	Opponent	Site	Result	Source
September 23	Fort McKinley*	Alumni Field; Orono, ME	W 19–0	
September 30	Rhode Island State*	Alumni Field; Orono, ME	L 0–3	
October 7	New Hampshire*	Alumni Field; Orono, ME (rivalry)	W 12–0	
October 14	at Tufts*	Ellis Oval; Medford, MA	W 6–0	
October 21	Vermont*	Alumni Field; Orono, ME	W 17–0	
October 28	Bates	Alumni Field; Orono, ME	L 0–5	
November 4	Colby	Alumni Field; Orono, ME	W 20–0	
November 11	at Bowdoin	Whittier Field; Brunswick, ME	W 15–0	
*Non-conference game
