= Jim Coombs =

American football player, coach, and singer (1869–1935)

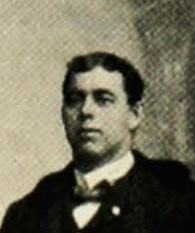
- Coombs pictured in The Prism 1901, Maine yearbook

Biographical details
- Born: June 6, 1869; Augusta, Maine, U.S.
- Died: February 22, 1935 (aged 65); Staten Island, New York, U.S.
- Education: Brown University (1897)

Playing career
- 1893–1896: Brown
- Position: Center

Coaching career (HC unless noted)
- 1897: Worcester Academy
- 1898: Maine
- 1899: Bowdoin (line)
- 1908: New York Hippodrome

Head coaching record
- Overall: 1–4 (college)

James Parker Coombs (June 6, 1869 – February 22, 1935), also known as Big Jim or Daddy Jim, was an American football player and coach and singer. He played football at Brown and coached at Maine before becoming a professional opera singer in Boston and New York City. He then performed as a member of Roxy's Gang on NBC's Blue Network.

== Early life ==
Coombs was born in Augusta, Maine. His family moved to Sedgwick, Maine when he was two years old, then to Portland, Maine when he was seventeen. He took vocal lessons in Portland and performed in public for the first time in 1894 in an amateur production of H.M.S. Pinafore. He prepared for college at the Bridgton Academy and Westbrook Seminary and took part in both music and athletics at these schools.

== Football ==
Coombs enrolled in Brown University in 1893 and was a member of the Brown varsity football team for four years. He competed in hammer throw and shot put for the Brown track team. He studied vocal music and was director of the university's chapel choir.

In 1897, Coombs coached Worcester Academy football team. That winter, he worked as a vocal coach in Portland. In 1898, he enlisted in the United States Navy as a bugler. He was honorably discharged with the rank of chief master-at-arms upon the conclusion of the Spanish–American War. That fall, he coached the Maine football team and, when the season ended, began instructing the school's glee club. The following season, he was the line coach at Bowdoin College, but returned to Maine later in the year to train the glee club.

== Singing ==
Coombs became a professional singer in 1900 after a lauded performance in a Portland production of Alessandro Stradella. He was hired by Henry Wilson Savage and performed in a number of his operas. He played the King and Herald in Lohengrin, Amonasro in Aida, and Plunkett in Martha. In 1904, he was one of a few Americans chosen to perform in an English-language production of Parsifal in Boston.

On April 12, 1905, Coombs made his New York City debut at the New York Hippodrome in Thompson & Dundy's A Yankee Circus on Mars. The play, directed by R. H. Burnside, had a cast of 1,200. Coombs was the lead Bass at the Hippodrome until it was acquired by the Shuberts in 1908. During his final year at the theater, he coached the Hippodrome's football team, which was made up of theater performers and played on a grass-mat covered stage. After a foray into motion pictures, Coombs returned to the Hippodrome and served as their first bass soloist for four more years. He spent two years at the Radio City Music Hall and was a soloist in the inaugural performance at the Capitol Theatre.

In 1924, Coombs joined Roxy's Gang, a cabaret group led by Samuel Roxy Rothafel. Going by the name "Daddy Jim Coombs", he performed on the group's radio program. He retired from the group in 1934. He died of a heart attack on February 22, 1935, at his home in Great Kills, Staten Island. He was survived by his wife and four children. He was cremated and his ashes were scattered at sea.

== Head coaching record ==
=== College ===
Year	Team	Overall	Conference	Standing	Bowl/playoffs
Maine (Maine Intercollegiate Athletic Association) (1898)
1898	Maine	1–4	0–4		
Maine:		1–4	0–4		
Total:		1–4			
