= Harry Orman Robinson =

American football player and coach (1872–1933)

Biographical details
- Born: February 26, 1872; Dexter, Maine, U.S.
- Died: October 1933 (aged 61); Boston, Massachusetts, U.S.

Playing career
- 1891–1892: Tufts
- Position: Lineman

Coaching career (HC unless noted)
- 1893–1894: Missouri
- 1896: Texas
- 1897: Maine

Head coaching record
- Overall: 13–10–1

Accomplishments and honors

Championships
- 2 WIUFA (1893–1894)

Harry Orman "Jake" Robinson (February 26, 1872 – October 1933) was an American college football player and coach. He served as the head football coach at the University of Missouri (1893–1894), the University of Texas at Austin (1896), and the University of Maine (1897), compiling a career coaching record of 13–10–1. The Bangor, Maine, native was born on February 26, 1872, and played football as a lineman at Tufts University.

== Head coaching record ==
=== Football ===
Year	Team	Overall	Conference	Standing	Bowl/playoffs
Missouri Tigers (Western Interstate University Football Association) (1893–1894)
1893	Missouri	4–3	2–1	T–1st	
1894	Missouri	4–3	2–1	T–1st	
Missouri:		8–6	4–2		
Texas Longhorns (Southern Intercollegiate Athletic Association) (1896)
1896	Texas	4–2–1			
Texas:		4–2–1			
Maine (Maine Intercollegiate Athletic Association) (1897)
1897	Maine	1–2	0–2		
Maine:		1–2	0–2		
Total:		13–10–1			
National championship Conference title Conference division title or championship game berth
