= Jack Abbott (coach) =

American athlete and coach (1873–1918)

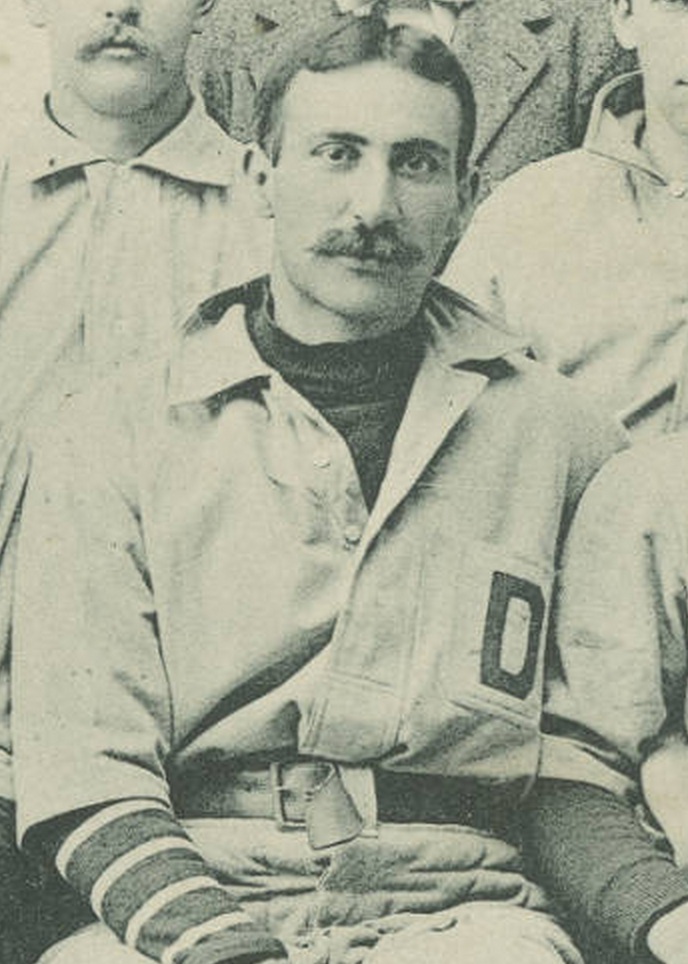
- Abbott pictured at Dartmouth College

Biographical details
- Born: February 6, 1873; Manchester, New Hampshire, U.S.
- Died: June 22, 1918 (aged 45); Concord, New Hampshire, U.S.
- Education: Dartmouth College (1896)

Playing career

Football
- ?: Dartmouth

Coaching career (HC unless noted)

Football
- 1896: Maine

Baseball
- 1896: Maine

Head coaching record
- Overall: 1–3–2 (football); 5–4 (baseball)

George Henry "Jack" Abbott (February 6, 1873 – June 22, 1918) was the head coach of the University of Maine's football team in 1896 and compiled a 1–3–2 record. Also in 1896, Abbott was the head coach of the Maine Black Bears baseball team, which a 5–4 record that season.

Abbott was a native of Manchester, New Hampshire, where he was born in 1873, and resided during his years at Dartmouth. He died at Concord, New Hampshire on June 22, 1918.

== Head coaching record ==
=== Football ===
Year	Team	Overall	Conference	Standing	Bowl/playoffs
Maine (Maine Intercollegiate Athletic Association) (1896)
1896	Maine	1–3–2	1–3–1		
Maine:		1–3–2	1–3–1		
Total:		1–3–2			

=== Baseball ===
The following is a list of Abbott's yearly baseball head coaching records.

Record table
Season	Team	Overall	Conference	Standing	Postseason
Maine (1896)
1896	Maine	5–4			
Total:		5–4			
