= Frank McCoy (American football) =

American football player and coach (1881–1954)

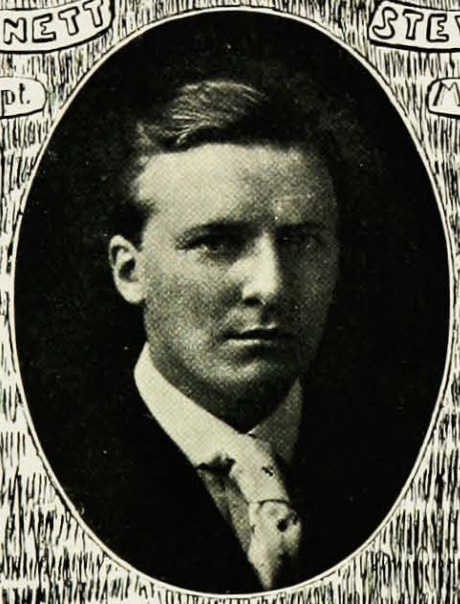
- McCoy pictured in The Prism 1917, Maine yearbook

Biographical details
- Born: February 26, 1881; Holyoke, Massachusetts, U.S.
- Died: February 9, 1954 (aged 72); White Plains, New York, U.S.
- Education: Yale Law School (1904)

Playing career
- 1900: Amherst
- 1904: Yale

Coaching career (HC unless noted)
- 1905–1908: Maine

Head coaching record
- Overall: 12–15–5

Accomplishments and honors

Championships
- 1 MIAA (1905)

Francis James McCoy (February 26, 1881 – February 9, 1954) was an American football coach. He served as the head football coach at the University of Maine from 1905 through 1908, compiling a record of 12–15–5.

McCoy was born in Holyoke, Massachusetts in 1881 to Owen and Annie (née Donahue) McCoy. He attended high school in Amherst, Massachusetts and also spent 1900 to 1901 at Amherst College, before attending Yale Law School, graduating in the class of 1904. He practiced law in Manhattan from 1905 until at least 1951. McCoy died on February 9, 1954, at White Plains Hospital in White Plains, New York.

== Head coaching record ==
Year	Team	Overall	Conference	Standing	Bowl/playoffs
Maine Elephants (Maine Intercollegiate Athletic Association) (1905–1908)
1905	Maine	4–3–1	2–0–1	1st	
1906	Maine	2–4–2	1–1–1		
1907	Maine	2–4–2	1–1–1		
1908	Maine	4–4	1–2		
Maine:		12–15–5	5–4–3		
Total:		12–15–5			
National championship Conference title Conference division title or championship game berth
