= Cranberry sauce =

Sauce made from cranberries

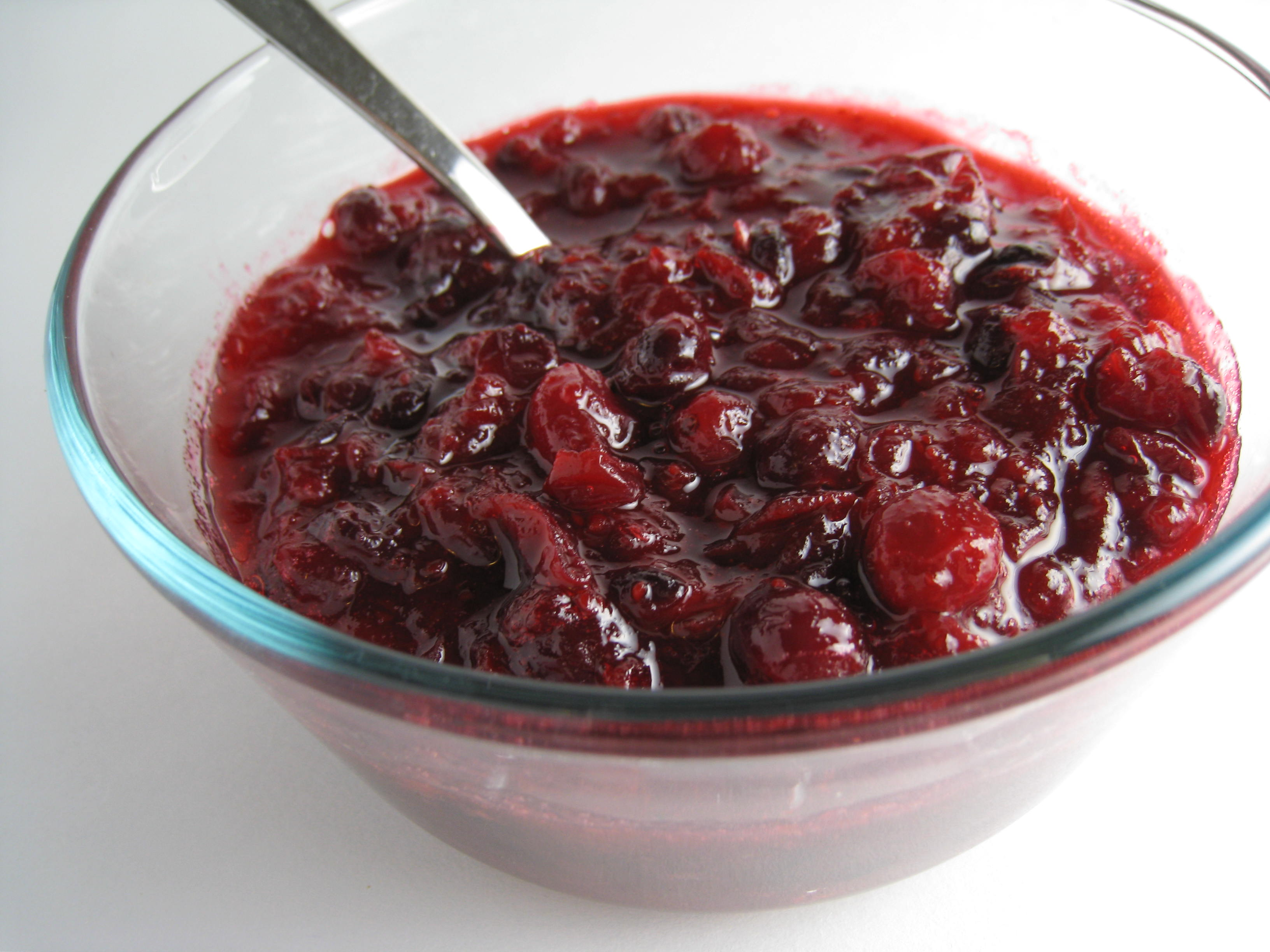
- Alternative names: Cranberry jam
- Type: Sauce or jam
- Place of origin: New England
- Main ingredients: Cranberries, sugar, water

Cranberry sauce or cranberry jam is a sauce or relish made out of cranberries, commonly served as a condiment or a side dish with Thanksgiving dinner in North America and Christmas dinner in the United Kingdom and Canada. There may be subtle differences in flavor depending on the geography of where the sauce is made: in Europe it is generally slightly sour-tasting, while in North America it is typically more heavily sweetened.

== History ==
Cranberry sauce is first mentioned as a companion to turkey in the 1796 edition of American Cookery by Amelia Simmons, the first known cookbook authored by an American.

In 1606, the Mi'kmaq people introduced the French settlers in Port-Royal, Nova Scotia, to cranberries. They would have been sweetened with maple sugar and served at the settlers first Thanksgiving in North America that year. The settlers described eating what they called "small red apples" in letters sent back to France. Port-Royal reports contained menus describing cranberries. They are still called pommes de prés, or 'meadow apples', today in Acadia.

Although the Pilgrims may have been aware of the wild cranberries growing in the Massachusetts Bay area, it is unlikely that cranberry sauce would have been among the dishes served at the First Thanksgiving meal. Cranberries are not mentioned by any primary sources for the First Thanksgiving meal. The only foods mentioned are "Indian corn", wild turkey and waterfowl, and venison. The rest remains a matter of speculation among food historians. Although stuffings are not mentioned in primary sources, it was a common way to prepare birds for the table in the 17th century. According to a "Thanksgiving Primer" published by the Plimoth Plantation, cranberries may have been used in the stuffing recipes, but it is unlikely they would have been made into a sauce because sugar was very scarce.

Commercial cranberry sauce was invented by Marcus Urann – founder of the Ocean Spray cooperative – and first offered to consumers in North America in 1912 in Hanson, Massachusetts. Canned cranberry sauce appeared on the market in 1941, allowing the product to be sold year-round. Cranberry sauce can be used with a variety of meats, including turkey, pork, chicken, and ham.

Cranberry sauce is often eaten in conjunction with turkey for Christmas in the United Kingdom and Canada or Thanksgiving in the United States and Canada, and it is only rarely eaten or served in other contexts there.

== Preparation ==
The most basic cranberry sauce consists of cranberries boiled in sugar water until the berries pop and the mixture thickens. Some recipes include other ingredients such as slivered almonds, orange juice, orange zest, ginger, maple syrup, ginger ale, port wine, or cinnamon.

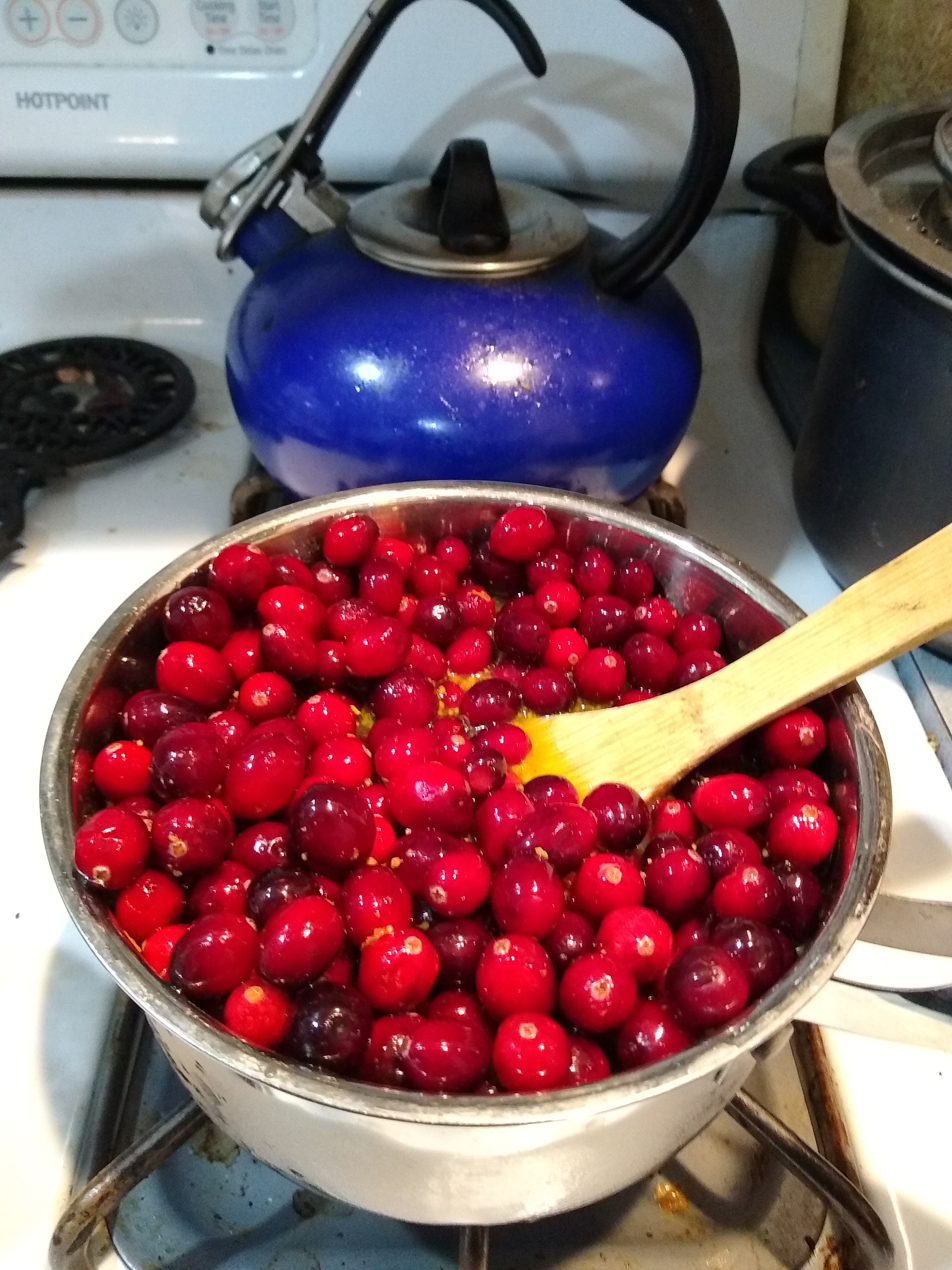
Preparing cranberry sauce at home

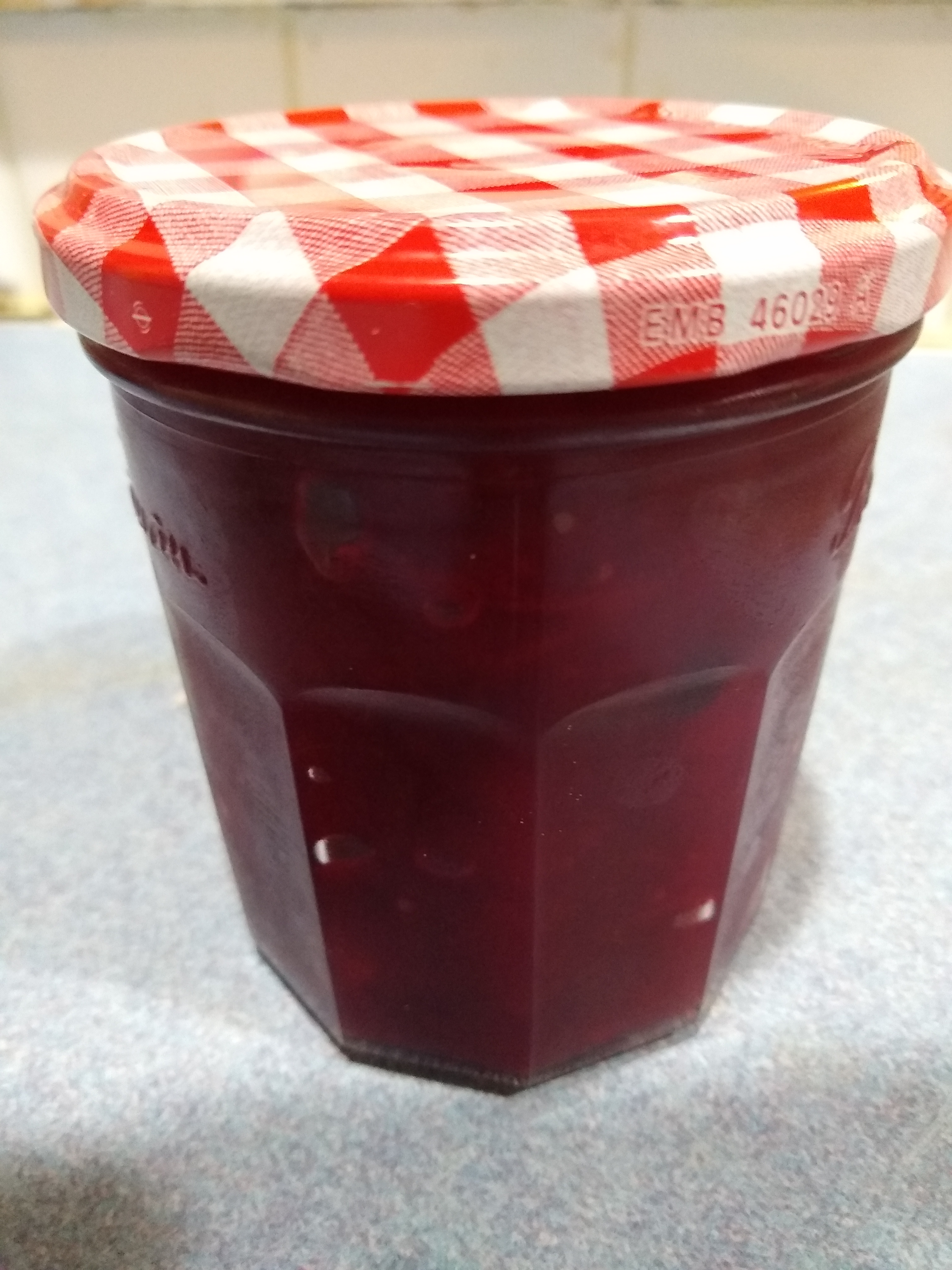
A home-made jar of cranberry sauce

== Commercial cranberry sauce ==
Commercial cranberry sauce may be loose and uncondensed, or condensed or jellied and sweetened with various ingredients. The jellied form may be slipped out of a can onto a dish, and served sliced or intact for slicing at the table. Marcus Urann first commercially produced cranberry sauce in 1912, selling it locally in the Massachusetts market. In 1941, it was first marketed nationally in the USA by the agricultural cooperative that later became known as Ocean Spray, where Urann was president.

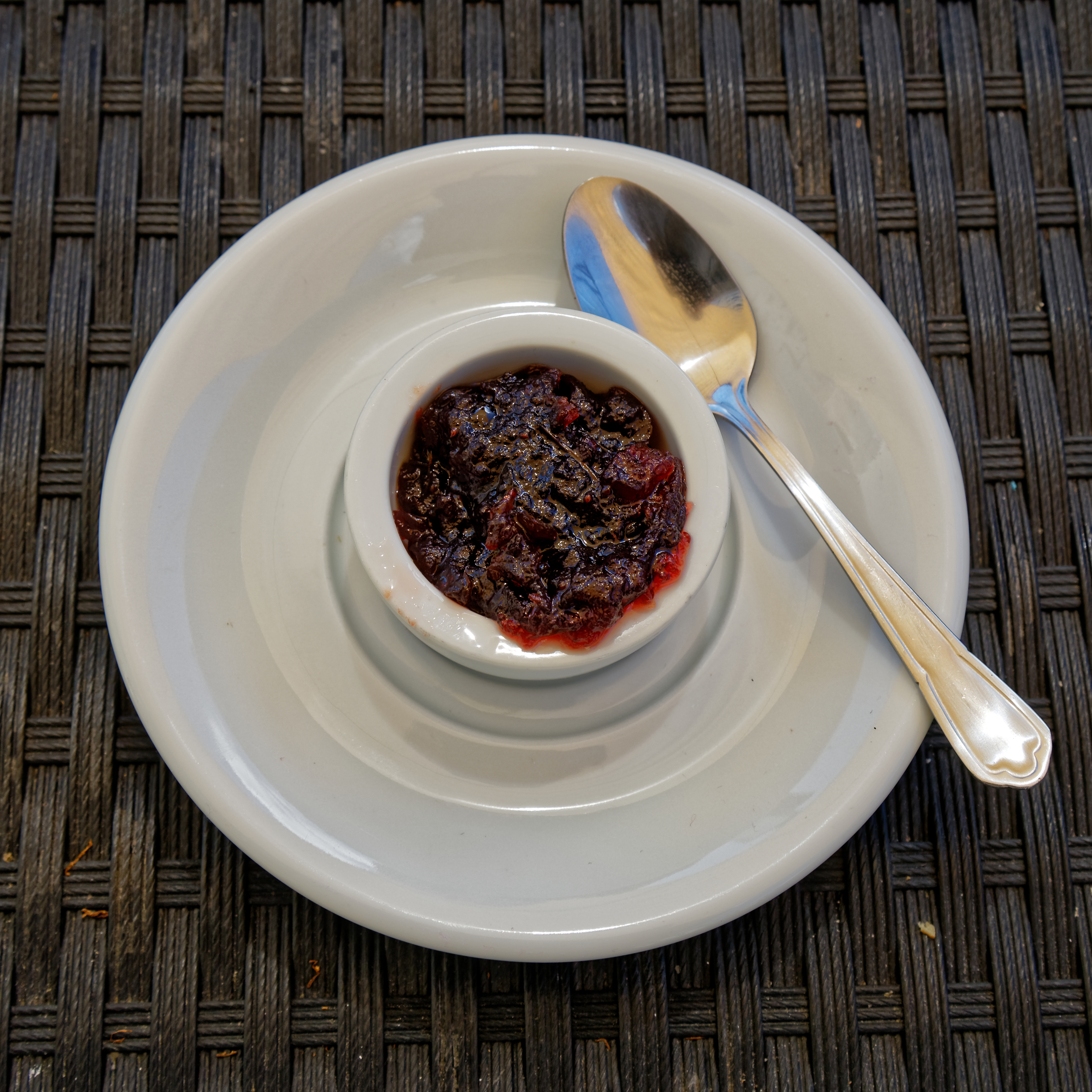
Cranberry sauce served at restaurant

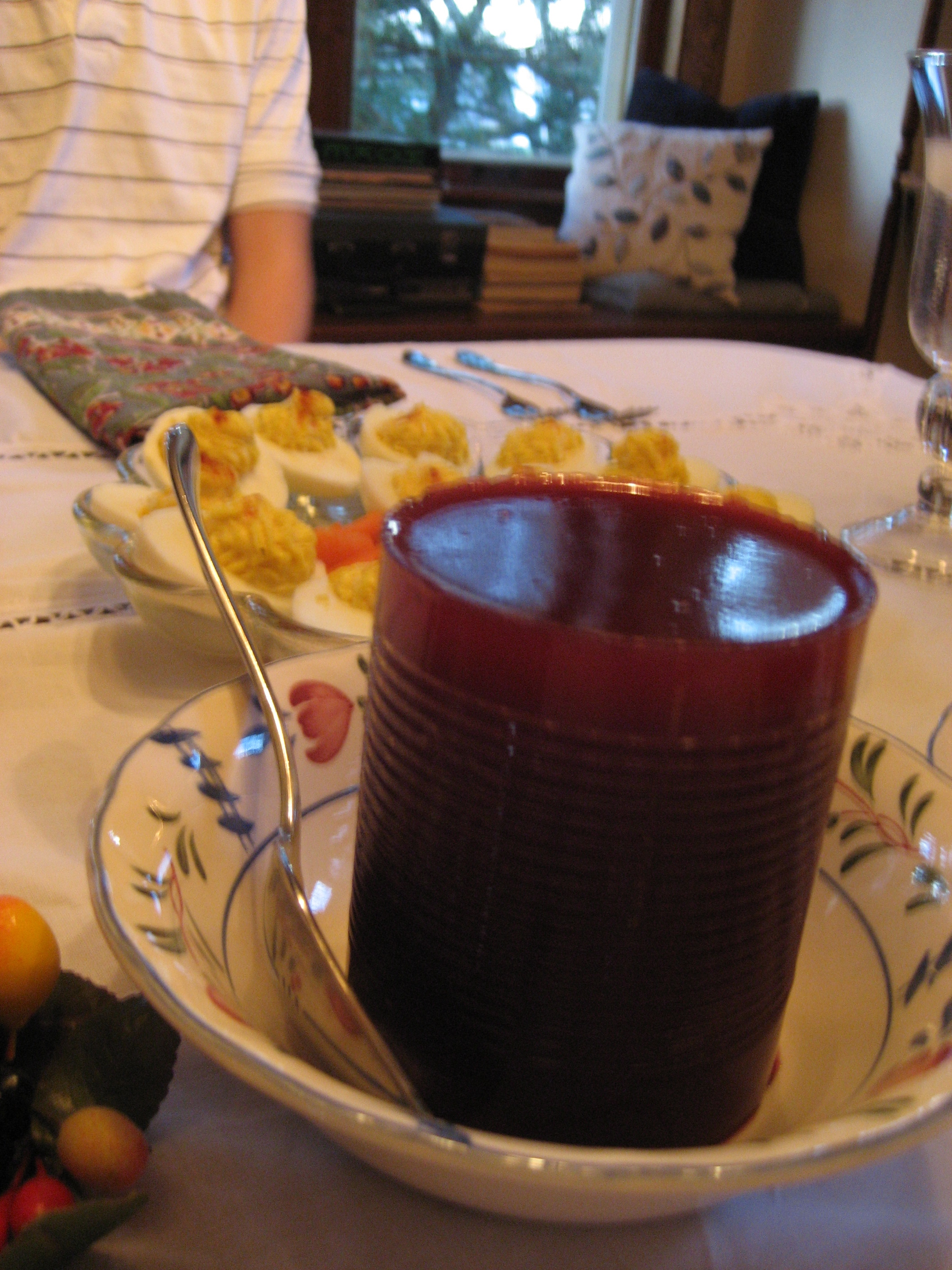
Cranberry jelly from a can

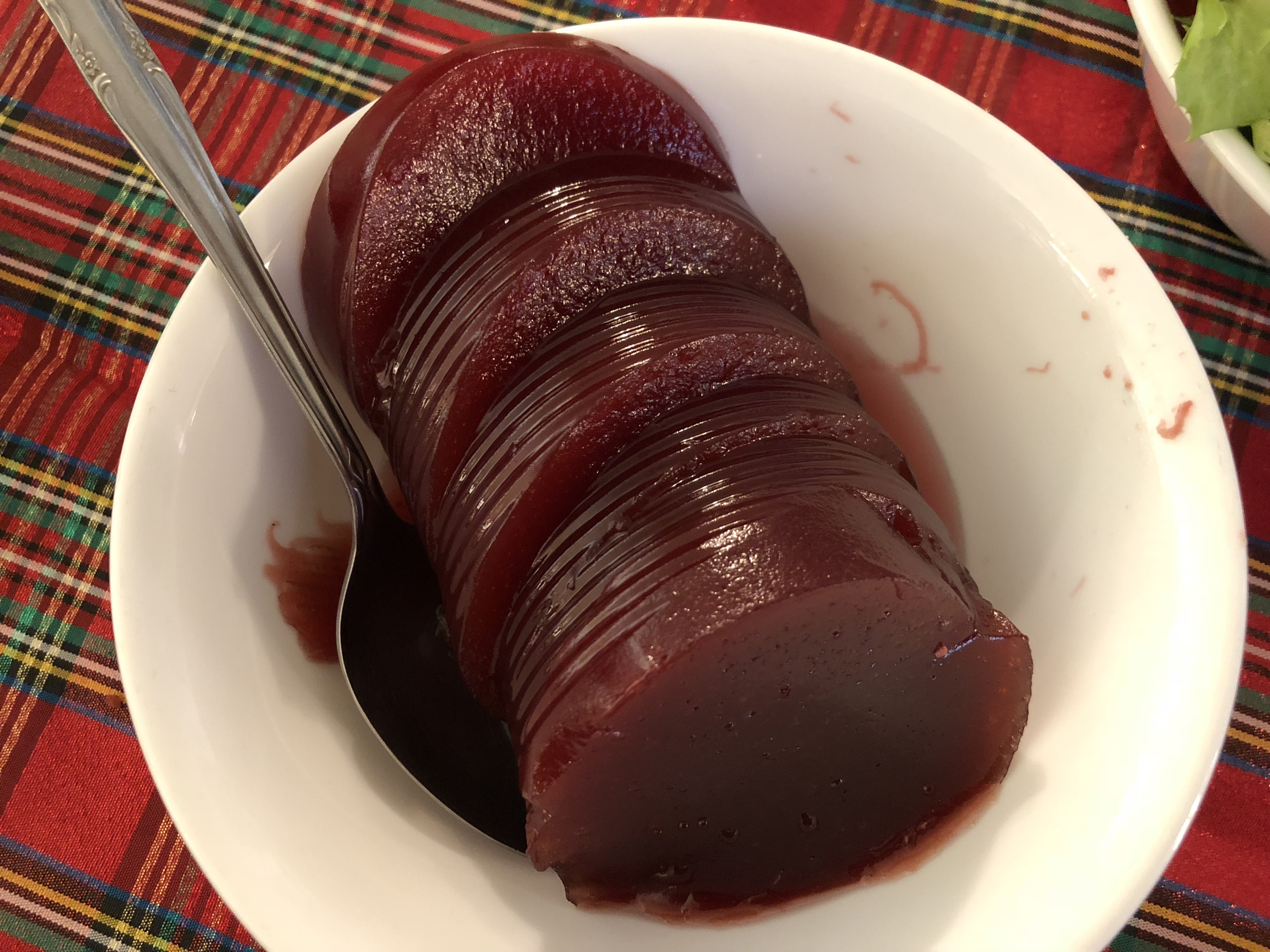
Cranberry jelly from a can, sliced

== See also ==
- Lingonberry jam
- Redcurrant sauce
- Mama Stamberg's Cranberry Relish
