= 1943 Maine Black Bears football team =

American college football season

1943 Maine Black Bears football
- Conference: Independent
- Record: 0–1
- Head coach: Samuel Sezak (1st season)
- Captain: Richard Morrill
- Home stadium: Alumni Field

The 1943 Maine Black Bears football team was an American football team that represented the University of Maine during the 1943 college football season. In its only season under head coach Samuel Sezak, the team played one game, losing 6–20 against Phillips Andover. Richard Morrill was team captain.

== Schedule ==
Date	Opponent	Site	Result	Source
October 23	Phillips Andover	Alumni Field; Orono, ME	L 6–20	
