= Donald R. Aldworth =

American football player and coach (1889–1961)

Donald R. Aldsworth
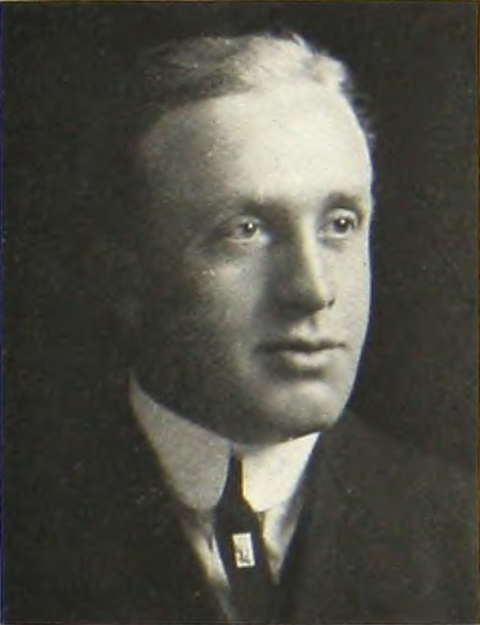
- Aldworth pictured in The Gopher 1914, Minnesota yearbook

Biographical details
- Born: December 5, 1889; Lake Benton, Minnesota, U.S.
- Died: January 21, 1961 (aged 71); Tampa, Florida, U.S.

Playing career
- 1911–1913: Minnesota
- Position: Right end

Coaching career (HC unless noted)
- 1918: Maine

Head coaching record
- Overall: 3–1

Donald Ross Aldworth (December 5, 1889 – January 21, 1961) was an American football player and coach who was captain of the 1913 Minnesota Golden Gophers football team and the head coach of the University of Maine's football team in 1918.

== Biography ==
Aldworth was born in Lake Benton, Minnesota on December 5, 1889. He played four seasons of football at Rochester High School in Rochester, Minnesota. He played right end for the University of Minnesota's football team from 1911 to 1913 and served as team captain in 1913. He graduated with a Bachelor of Science in forestry in 1914, then worked as a mill representative in Montana.

On August 17, 1917, Aldworth entered the officer's training school at the Presidio of San Francisco. On November 27, 1917, he was commissioned a first lieutenant in the Infantry Branch of the United States Army and assigned to the 91st Training Division at Camp Lewis. On May 16, 1918, he was promoted to captain and transferred to the University of Maine's U. S. Army training detachment. That fall, he also served as head coach of Maine's football team. He compiled a 3–1 record.

On December 31, 1919, Aldworth married Frances M. Gray in Old Town, Maine. They had four children.

In 1930, Aldworth owned a blanket business in New York City and was living in Garden City, New York. He later owned a motel in Old Town. He died on January 21, 1961 at a motel in Tampa, Florida from gas asphyxiation caused by a faulty space heater.

== Head coaching record ==
Year	Team	Overall	Conference	Standing	Bowl/playoffs
Maine Black Bears (Maine Intercollegiate Athletic Association) (1918)
1918	Maine	3–1	2–1		
Maine:		3–1	2–1		
Total:		3–1			
