= Wildes Veazie =

American football coach (1870–1948)

Wildes P. Veazie
Biographical details
- Born: April 3, 1870; Bangor, Maine, U.S.
- Died: June 25, 1948 (aged 78); Pendleton, Oregon, U.S.
- Education: Harvard University

Coaching career (HC unless noted)
- 1894: Maine

Head coaching record
- Overall: 0–1

Wildes Perkins Walker Veazie (April 3, 1870 – June 25, 1948) was an American college football coach. He served as the head coach of the University of Maine's football team in 1893 and compiled a 0–5 record. He was an alumnus of Harvard University.

== Head coaching record ==
Year	Team	Overall	Conference	Standing	Bowl/playoffs
Maine (Maine Intercollegiate Athletic Association) (1894)
1894	Maine	0–1	0–0		
Maine:		0–1			
Total:		0–1			
