= George Schildmiller =

American football player and coach (1882–1947)

- Schildmiller in 1910

Biographical details
- Born: January 9, 1882; Brattleboro, Vermont
- Died: February 23, 1960 (aged 78); Miami, Florida

Playing career
- 1905–1908: Dartmouth
- Position: End

Coaching career (HC unless noted)
- 1909: Maine
- 1910: Oregon Agricultural

Head coaching record
- Overall: 6–6–2

Accomplishments and honors

Awards
- Consensus All-American (1908)

George Henry Schildmiller (January 9, 1882 – February 23, 1960) was an American college football player and coach. He played for Dartmouth College and coached at the University of Maine in 1909 and at Oregon State University in 1910.

== Early life and playing career ==
Schildmiller was born on January 9, 1882, in Brattleboro, Vermont. He graduated from Phillips Academy and enrolled in Cornell University, but withdrew after one term. He then transferred to Dartmouth college, where he played forward on the basketball team, first base on the baseball team, and right end on the football team. In 1908, he was named to the College Football All-America Team.

== Coaching career ==
At the conclusion of his playing career, Schildmiller coached at the University of Maine. He remained at Maine for one season and posted a record of 3–4–1.

In 1910, Schildmiller came to Corvallis, Oregon, to become the head football coach at Oregon State, known then as Oregon Agricultural College. He coached for only one season at OSU as well and posted a record of 3–2–1.

== Business career ==
Schildmiller spent most of his working life in the Midwestern United States. His employers included Pepsodent, the American Radiator Company, the National Radiator Company, and Gulf Oil.

== Personal life ==
On August 2, 1910, Schildmiller married Leila May Jenkins in Winthrop, Massachusetts. He lived in the Cincinnati metro area during the 1930s and 1940s, where his daughter, Dorothy "Dolly" Schildmiller, was a top-level competitive golfer, winning the city golf championship five times. His son, George A. Schildmiller, enlisted in the Army shortly after the start of World War II and died in Alsace, France, on December 19, 1944.

Schildmiller retired in 1954 and moved to Miami. He died on February 23, 1960, from pneumonia following surgery. He was survived by his wife and two daughters (Gretchen and Dorothy).

== Head coaching record ==
Year	Team	Overall	Conference	Standing	Bowl/playoffs
Maine Elephants (Maine Intercollegiate Athletic Association) (1909)
1909	Maine	3–4–1	1–2		
Maine:		3–4–1	1–2		
Oregon Agricultural Aggies (Northwest Conference) (1910)
1910	Oregon Agricultural	3–2–1	2–2	3rd	
Oregon Agricultural:		3–2–1	2–2		
Total:		6–6–2			
