= Emmett O. King =

American football player and coach (1875–1934)

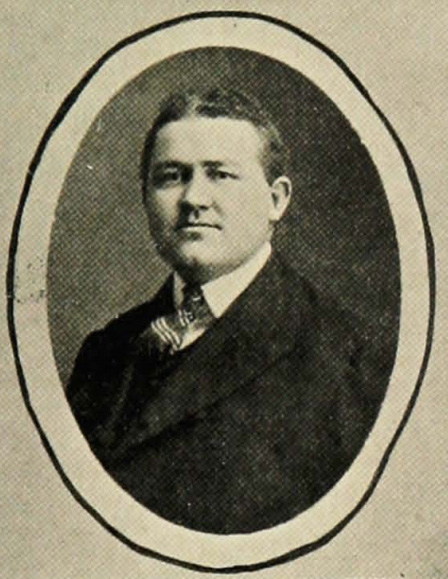
- King pictured in The Prism 1906, Maine yearbook

Biographical details
- Born: October 8, 1875; Huntington, Indiana, U.S.
- Died: October 20, 1934 (aged 59); Greencastle, Indiana, U.S.

Playing career
- 1895–1897: Indiana
- 1902: Harvard
- Positions: Center, right guard

Coaching career (HC unless noted)
- 1900: Bluffton HS (IN)
- 1903: Indiana (assistant)
- 1904: Maine

Head coaching record
- Overall: 5–4

Emmett Orlando "Fat" King (October 8, 1875 – October 20, 1934) was an American college football player and coach.

King played guard for the Indiana Hoosiers football team and was team captain during his final three seasons. In 1900, he was the head football coach at Bluffton High School in Bluffton, Indiana. He entered Harvard Law School in 1901 and played center for the 1902 Harvard Crimson football team until he was declared ineligible. He returned to Indiana in 1903 as an assistant coach. He served as the head football coach at the University of Maine in 1904 and compiled a 5–4 record. King later worked as a lawyer in Indiana until his death from a heart attack in 1934.

== Head coaching record ==
Year	Team	Overall	Conference	Standing	Bowl/playoffs
Maine Elephants (Maine Intercollegiate Athletic Association) (1904)
1904	Maine	5–4	0–3		
Total:		5–4			
