= Maine football, 1892–1899 =

American college football seasons

The Maine football program from 1892 to 1899 represented the University of Maine in its first decade of intercollegiate football.

== 1892 ==
1892 Maine football
- Conference: Independent
- Record: 0–2
- Head coach: No coach
- Captain: Harry Smith

The 1892 Maine football team was an American football team that represented the University of Maine during the 1892 college football season. In its first season of intercollegiate football, the team compiled a 0–2 record. The team had no coach and Harry Smith was the team captain.

=== Schedule ===
Date	Opponent	Site	Result	Attendance	Source
October 30	at Colby	Waterville, ME	L 0–12	200–300	
November 12	at Bangor High School	Maplewood Park; Bangor, ME	L 3–33		

== 1893 ==
1893 Maine football
- Conference: Maine Intercollegiate Athletic Association
- Record: 0–5 (0–4 MIAA)
- Head coach: Chesley Johnston (1st season)
- Captain: Marcus Urann

The 1893 Maine football team was an American football team that represented the University of Maine during the 1893 college football season. In its second season of intercollegiate football, the team compiled a 0–5 record. Chesley Johnston was the coach, and Marcus Urann was the team captain.

=== Schedule ===
Date	Time	Opponent	Site	Result	Attendance	Source
October 26		Bowdoin sophomores		L 10–12		
October 31		at Bangor High School*	Maplewood Park; Bangor, ME	L 4–10	500	
November 1		at Colby	Waterville, Maine	L 4–30		
		Bates		L 0–18		
November 8	2:30 p.m.	at Bates	Bates College grounds; Lewiston, ME	L 6–52		
*Non-conference game

== 1894 ==
1894 Maine football
- Conference: Maine Intercollegiate Athletic Association
- Record: 0–1 (0–0 MIAA)
- Head coach: Wildes Veazie (1st season)
- Captain: Harvey White

The 1894 Maine football team was an American football team that represented the University of Maine during the 1894 college football season. In its third season of intercollegiate football, the team compiled a 0–1 record. Wildes Veazie was the team's coach and Harvey White was the team captain.

=== Schedule ===
Date	Opponent	Site	Result
	Bangor High School*		L 0–6
*Non-conference game

== 1895 ==
1895 Maine football
- Conference: Maine Intercollegiate Athletic Association
- Record: 1–4 (0–4 MIAA)
- Head coach: P. Folsom (1st season)
- Captains: Haller Seavey; Charles Pearce

The 1895 Maine football team was an American football team that represented the University of Maine during the 1895 college football season. In its fourth season of intercollegiate football, the team compiled a 1–4 record. The team recorded the first victory in program history against Foxcroft Academy, a preparatory school in Dover-Foxcroft, Maine. P. Folsom was the coach. Haller Seavey and Charles Pearce were the team captains.

=== Schedule ===
Date	Opponent	Site	Result
	Foxcroft Academy*		W 22–0
	Colby		L 6–18
	Colby		L 0–56
	Bates		L 0–20
	Bates		L 0–18
*Non-conference game

== 1896 ==
1896 Maine football
- Conference: Maine Intercollegiate Athletic Association
- Record: 1–3–2 (1–3–1 MIAA)
- Head coach: Jack Abbott (1st season)
- Captain: Charles Sawyer

The 1896 Maine football team was an American football team that represented the University of Maine during the 1896 college football season. In its fifth season of intercollegiate football, the team compiled a 1–3–2 record. The team recorded the second victory in program history against Bates College. Jack Abbott was the coach, and Charles Sawyer was the team captain.

=== Schedule ===
Date	Opponent	Site	Result
	Bowdoin		L 6–12
	Colby		L 0–10
	Bates		T 4–4
	Bates		W 24–0
	Colby		L 0–4
	Bangor High School*		T 0–0
*Non-conference game

== 1897 ==
1897 Maine football
- Conference: Maine Intercollegiate Athletic Association
- Record: 1–2 (0–2 MIAA)
- Head coach: Harry Orman Robinson (1st season)
- Captain: Charles Sawyer

The 1897 Maine football team was an American football team that represented the University of Maine during the 1897 college football season. In its sixth season of intercollegiate football, the team compiled a 1–2 record. The team recorded the third victory in program history against MIT. Harry Orman Robinson was the coach, and Charles Sawyer was the team captain.

=== Schedule ===
Date	Opponent	Site	Result	Source
	Bates		L 6–8	
	Bates		L 4–5	
October 23	MIT*	Bangor, ME	W 14–0	
*Non-conference game

== 1898 ==
1898 Maine football
- Conference: Maine Intercollegiate Athletic Association
- Record: 1–4 (0–4 MIAA)
- Head coach: Jim Coombs (1st season)
- Captain: Allen Bird

The 1898 Maine football team was an American football team that represented the University of Maine during the 1898 college football season. In its seventh season of intercollegiate football, the team compiled a 1–4 record. Jim Coombs was the coach, and Allen Bird was the team captain.

=== Schedule ===
Date	Opponent	Site	Result
	Bates		L 0–36
	Bowdoin		L 0–28
	Foxcroft Academy*		W 60–0
	Bates		L 0–34
	Colby		L 5–6
*Non-conference game

== 1899 ==
1899 Maine football
- Conference: Maine Intercollegiate Athletic Association
- Record: 2–3 (2–3 MIAA)
- Head coach: W. B. Hopkins (1st season)
- Captain: Allen Bird

The 1899 Maine football team was an American football team that represented the University of Maine during the 1899 college football season. In its eighth season of intercollegiate football, the team compiled a 2–3 record. W. B. Hopkins was the coach, and Allen Bird was the team captain.

=== Schedule ===
Date	Opponent	Site	Result
	Bowdoin		L 0–14
	Colby		W 26–0
	Bates		L 0–16
	Bates		L 0–27
	Colby		W 5–0
