= John Wells Farley =

American football player and coach

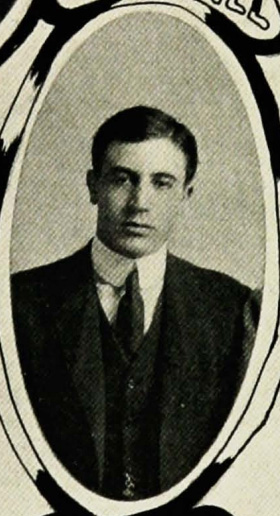
- Farley pictured in The Prism 1905, Maine yearbook

Biographical details
- Born: June 15, 1878; Brookline, Massachusetts, U.S.
- Died: March 12, 1959 (aged 80); Needham, Massachusetts, U.S.

Playing career
- 1898: Harvard
- Position: End

Coaching career (HC unless noted)
- 1901: Maine
- 1902: Harvard
- 1903: Maine

Head coaching record
- Overall: 23–5

Accomplishments and honors

Championships
- 2 MIAA (1901, 1903)

John Wells "Mike" Farley (June 15, 1878 – March 12, 1959) was an American college football player and coach, lawyer, newspaper publisher, and civic leader. He served as the head coach at the University of Maine in 1901 and 1903 and at Harvard University in 1902, compiling a career college football record of 23–5. In 1901, Farley achieved a 7–1 record and gave Maine its first-ever conference championship, winning the Maine Intercollegiate Athletic Association (MIAA). His record of 5–3 in 1903 also earned the Black Bears a third straight MIAA championship. The team won a conference title under Eddie N. Robinson in his only season as head coach in 1902.

Farley was born in Brookline, Massachusetts. He graduated from Harvard College in 1899 and Harvard Law School in 1903. Farley practiced with law with the firm of Herrick, Smith, Donald, Farley & Ketchum in Boston. In 1910, he became publisher and treasurer of the Boston Herald. He later served as president of Boston Children's Hospital and founded the Children's Medical Center. Farley died on March 12, 1959, in Needham, Massachusetts.

== Head coaching record ==
Year	Team	Overall	Conference	Standing	Bowl/playoffs
Maine (Maine Intercollegiate Athletic Association) (1901)
1901	Maine	7–1		1st	
Harvard Crimson (Independent) (1902)
1902	Harvard	11–1			
Harvard:		11–1			
Maine Elephants (Maine Intercollegiate Athletic Association) (1903)
1903	Maine	5–3		1st	
Maine:		12–4			
Total:		23–5			
National championship Conference title Conference division title or championship game berth

== See also ==
- List of college football head coaches with non-consecutive tenure
