= Chesley Johnston =

American football coach (1870–1942)

Biographical details
- Born: November 8, 1870; Maine, U.S.
- Died: October 23, 1942 (aged 71); Philadelphia, Pennsylvania, U.S.
- Education: Tufts University

Playing career
- 1892: Tufts

Coaching career (HC unless noted)
- 1893: Maine

Head coaching record
- Overall: 0–2

Chesley Metcalf Johnston (November 8, 1870 – October 23, 1942) was an American college football coach. He was the first head football coach at Maine State College—now known as the University of Maine—where he coached in 1892 and compiled a 0–2 record.

Johnston attended Maine State College but did not graduate. He then attended Tufts University and graduated in 1895 from the College of Letters with a bachelor of civil engineering degree. He was a member of the Alpha Tau Omega (ΑΤΩ) fraternity. In 1893, The Boston Globe announced that Johnston, who "played on the Tufts eleven last year," was engaged to coach the "M. S. C." football players "who are already doing excellent work". Following his graduation, Johnston pursued a career as a construction engineer. He died on October 23, 1942, in Philadelphia, Pennsylvania of liver cancer, at the age of 72.

== Head coaching record ==
Year	Team	Overall	Conference	Standing	Bowl/playoffs
Maine (Maine Intercollegiate Athletic Association) (1893)
1893	Maine	0–5	0–4		
Maine:		0–5	0–4		
Total:		0–5			
