= W. B. Hopkins =

American football player and coach (1869–1935)

Biographical details
- Born: January 1, 1869; Ontario, New York, U.S.
- Died: December 6, 1935 (aged 66); Marion, New York, U.S.

Playing career
- 1893–1894: Brown

Coaching career (HC unless noted)
- 1899: Maine

Head coaching record
- Overall: 2–3

William Burr Hopkins (January 1, 1869 – December 6, 1935) was the head coach of the University of Maine's football team in 1899 and compiled a 2–3 record.

Hopkins was born in 1869 to Burton and Anna (née Sprague) Hopkins. He was captain of the Brown University football teams of 1893 and 1894. After Brown, he worked as an engineer in Pennsylvania before serving overseas in France for World War I. After his return, he married Fanny Schinsing in 1921 and worked as a farmer until his death in 1935 after a horse accident.

== Head coaching record ==
Year	Team	Overall	Conference	Standing	Bowl/playoffs
Maine (Maine Intercollegiate Athletic Association) (1899)
1899	Maine	2–3	2–3		
Maine:		2–3	2–3		
Total:		2–3			
