= Samuel Sezak =

American football and basketball coach (1906–1989)

Biographical details
- Born: May 30, 1906; Ostrog, Russian Empire
- Died: March 21, 1989 (aged 82); Bangor, Maine, U.S.

Coaching career (HC unless noted)

Football
- 1931: Machias HS (ME)
- 1932: Milbridge HS (ME)
- 1932: Washington State Normal School
- 1933–1936: Rockland HS (ME)
- 1937–1939: Fairhaven HS (MA)
- 1940–1942: Maine (JV and freshmen)
- 1943: Maine
- 1944: East Orange HS (NJ)
- 1946: Maine (JV)
- 1947–1959: Maine (freshmen)

Men's basketball
- 1932–1933: Milbridge HS (ME)
- 1936–1940: Fairhaven HS (MA)
- 1940–1942: Maine (JV and freshmen)
- 1942–1944: Maine

Baseball
- 1933: Milbridge HS (ME)
- 1934–1937: Rockland HS (ME)
- 1938–1940: Fairhaven HS (MA)
- 1947: Maine (assistant)

Track
- 1938–1940: Fairhaven HS (MA)

Head coaching record
- Overall: 0–1 (football); 13–12 (basketball)

Samuel Sezak (May 30, 1906 – March 21, 1989) was a Russian-born American football and basketball coach. A longtime high school coach, he served the head men's basketball coach at the University of Maine from 1942 to 1944, amassing a record of 13–12. He was also the head football coach at Maine for the 1943 season and compiled a 0–1 record.

== Early life ==
Sezak was born Schlaimel Sezak in Ostrog, Russia to Max and Machll (later Mary) Sezak. Max moved to the United States in 1908 and worked at the Filene's Department Store in Boston. In 1910, Sezak and his mother reunited with Max in Boston after sailing from Bremen to Ellis Island aboard the SS Breslau. Sezak attended Wellesley High School in Wellesley, Massachusetts and the Hebron Academy in Hebron, Maine.

== Coaching ==
Sezak graduated from the University of Maine in 1931 and began his coaching career that fall, leading Machias High School's football team to a 5–3 record. He coached at Milbridge High School and the Washington State Normal School the following year, then spent four years at Rockland High School. After three years at Fairhaven High School in Fairhaven, Massachusetts, Sezak joined the faculty at the University of Maine as a physical education instructor and freshman and junior varsity football, baseball, and basketball coach. During World War II, he filled in as varsity football and basketball coach. During the 1944–45 school year, he coached football, basketball, and track at East Orange High School in East Orange, New Jersey. He returned to Maine in 1945 and spent a decade as director of intramural sports. He retired in 1971 as professor emeritus of physical education and athletics.

Sezak died on March 21, 1989 at a hospital in Bangor, Maine.

== Head coaching record ==
=== Football ===
Year	Team	Overall	Conference	Standing	Bowl/playoffs
Maine Black Bears (Maine Intercollegiate Athletic Association) (1943)
1943	Maine	0–1			
Maine:		0–1			
Total:		0–1			
