= Ernest Burton (American football) =

American football coach

Coaching career (HC unless noted)
- 1900: Maine

Head coaching record
- Overall: 4–4

Charles Ernest Burton was an American college football coach. He was the head coach of the University of Maine's football team in 1900 and compiled a 4–4 record.

Burton attended Somerville High School in Somerville, Massachusetts, and was captain of the school's baseball team in 1896. He studied electrical engineering at Tufts University and graduated in 1900.

After his one year at Maine, Burton worked as a mechanical engineer for the Tennessee Coal, Iron and Railroad Company in Ensley, Alabama and was as a civil engineer in Portland, Maine. In 1910, he married Katherine Bell Lamprey at the home of her brother-in-law, U.S. Representative Charles L. Underhill.

== Head coaching record ==
| Year | Team | Overall | Conference | Standing | Bowl/playoffs |
|---|---|---|---|---|---|
Maine (Maine Intercollegiate Athletic Association) (1900)
| 1900 | Maine | 4–4 | 0–4 | | |
| Maine: | | 4–4 | 0–4 | | |
| Total: | | 4–4 | | | |
