= Edgar Wingard =

American college sports coach

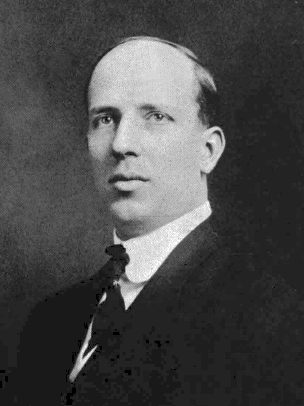
- Wingard pictured in The Prism 1912, Maine yearbook

Biographical details
- Born: September 21, 1878; Altoona, Pennsylvania, U.S.
- Died: July 31, 1927 (aged 48); Selinsgrove, Pennsylvania, U.S.

Coaching career (HC unless noted)

Football
- 1903: Ohio Normal
- 1904–1905: Butler
- 1906: Western U. of Pennsylvania
- 1907–1908: LSU
- 1909: Carlisle (assistant)
- 1910–1911: Maine
- 1912: Maine (assistant)
- 1916–1917: Susquehanna
- 1918: Bucknell
- 1919: Susquehanna
- 1924–1925: Susquehanna

Basketball
- 1904–1906: Butler
- 1908–1909: LSU
- 1916–1917: Susquehanna

Baseball
- 1908–1909: LSU
- 1911: Maine

Track and Field
- 1907–1909: LSU

Administrative career (AD unless noted)
- 1910–1916: Maine

Head coaching record
- Overall: 74–38–6 (football); 21–12 (basketball); 19–30–1 (baseball)
- Bowls: 0–1

Accomplishments and honors

Championships
- Football; 1 National (1908); 1 SIAA (1908); 1 Maine Intercollegiate Athletic Association (1911)

Edgar Ramey Wingard (September 21, 1878 – July 31, 1927) was an American football, basketball, and baseball coach and college athletics administrator. He served as the head football coach at seven different schools: Ohio Northern University (1903), Butler University (1904–1905), Western University of Pennsylvania—now known as the University of Pittsburgh (1906), Louisiana State University (1907–1908), the University of Maine (1910–1911), Susquehanna University (1916–1917, 1919, 1924–1925), and Bucknell University (1918), compiling a career record of 74–38–6. In 1908, Wingard led his LSU team to a record of 10–0. The team has been recognized as a national champion by the National Championship Foundation, although LSU does not officially claim a national title that season. Wingard was the head coach of the basketball team at Butler from 1904 to 1906 and the head coach of the first LSU Tigers basketball team during the 1908–09 season. He coached the LSU Tigers baseball team in 1908 and 1909 and the baseball team at Maine in 1911. Wingard also coached the LSU Tigers track and field team from 1907 to 1909.

Wingard died of a cerebral hemorrhage in the summer of 1927 at a hospital in Selinsgrove, Pennsylvania.

== Head coaching record ==
=== Football ===
Year	Team	Overall	Conference	Standing	Bowl/playoffs
Ohio Normal (Independent) (1903)
1903	Ohio Normal	7–5			
Ohio Normal:		7–5			
Butler Christians (Independent) (1904)
1904	Butler	6–1			
1905	Butler	7–2–1			
Butler:		13–3–1			
Western University of Pennsylvania (Independent) (1906)
1906	Western University of Pennsylvania	6–4			
Pittsburgh:		6–4			
LSU Tigers (Southern Intercollegiate Athletic Association) (1907–1908)
1907	LSU	7–3	3–1	7th	W Bacardi
1908	LSU	10–0	2–0	1st	
LSU:		17–3	5–1		
Maine Elephants (Maine Intercollegiate Athletic Association) (1910–1911)
1910	Maine	5–1–2	1–1–1		
1911	Maine	6–2	2–1	1st	
Maine:		11–3–2	3–2–1		
Susquehanna Crusaders (Independent) (1916–1917)
1916	Susquehanna	4–5			
1917	Susquehanna	1–0			
Bucknell (Independent) (1918)
1918	Bucknell	6–0			
Bucknell:		6–0			
Susquehanna Crusaders (Independent) (1919)
1919	Susquehanna	5–4–1			
Susquehanna Crusaders (Independent) (1924–1925)
1924	Susquehanna	3–5			
1925	Susquehanna	1–6–2			
Susquehanna:		14–20–3			
Total:		74–38–6			
National championship Conference title Conference division title or championship game berth

=== Basketball ===
Record table
Season	Team	Overall	Conference	Standing	Postseason
Butler Christians (Independent) (1904–1906)
1904–05	Butler	6–2			
1905–06	Butler	1–1			
Butler:		7–3 (.700)			
LSU Tigers (Southern Intercollegiate Athletic Association) (1908–1909)
1908–09	LSU	5–2	2–0		
LSU:		5–2 (.714)	2–0 (1.000)		
Susquehanna Crusaders (Independent) (1916–1917)
1916–17	Susquehanna	9–7			
Susquehanna:		9–7 (.563)			
Total:		21–12 (.636)			

=== Baseball ===
Record table
Season	Team	Overall	Conference	Standing	Postseason
LSU Tigers (1908–1909)
1908	LSU	9–12–1			
1909	LSU	7–10			
LSU:		16–22–1			
Maine Black Bears (1911)
1911	Maine	3–8			
Maine:		3–8			
Total:		19–30–1			
