= Thomas A. McCann =

American football coach

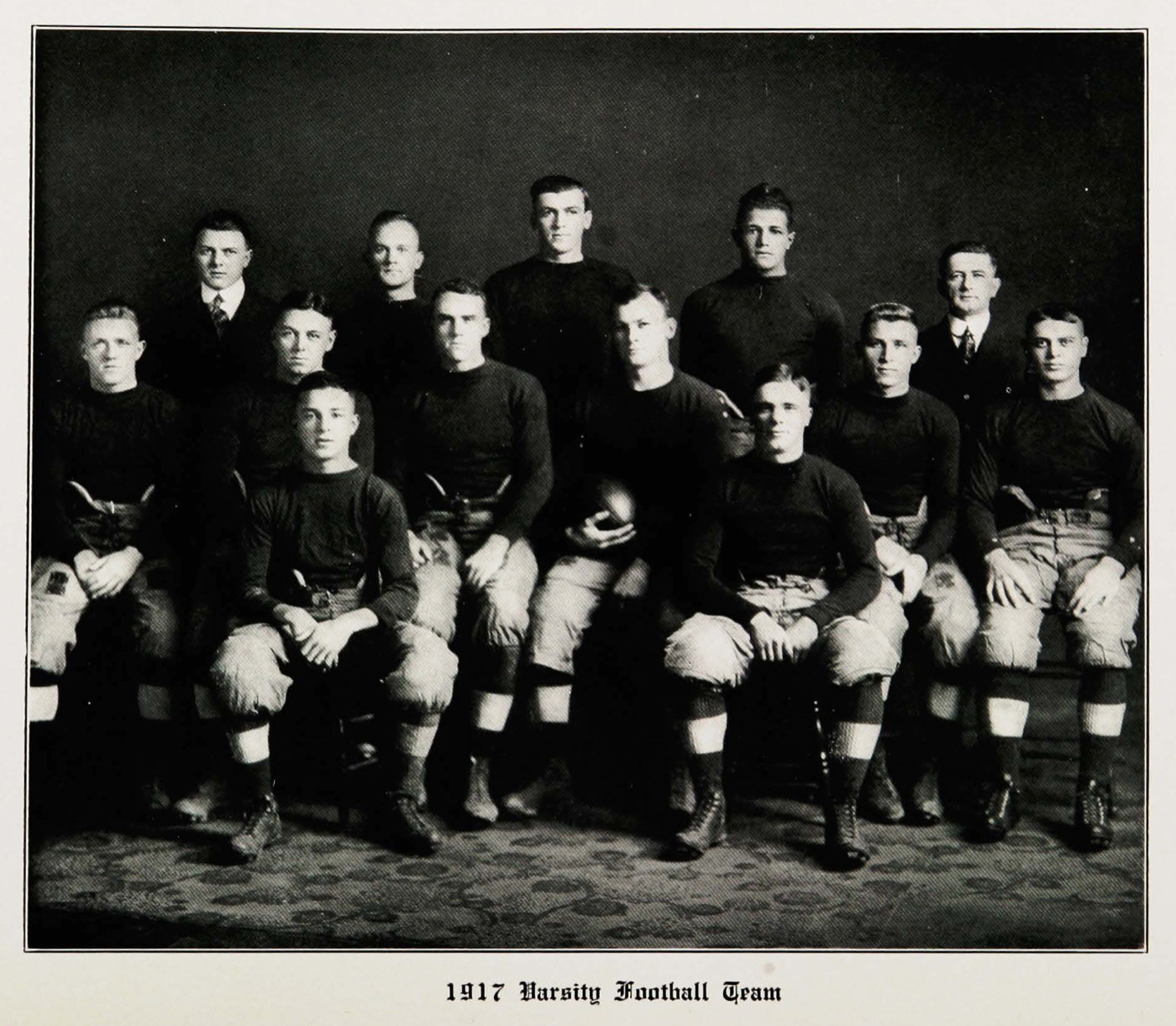
- 1917 Maine Black Bears varsity football team, coached by McCann

Biographical details
- Died: March 13, 1932 (aged 53); Bangor, Maine, U.S.

Coaching career (HC unless noted)
- 1902–1912: Bangor HS (ME)
- 1913–1914: Bowdoin
- 1915–1916: Bangor HS (ME)
- 1917: Maine
- 1918–1919: Bangor HS (ME)
- 1923: Brewer HS (ME)

Head coaching record
- Overall: 6–13–1 (college)

Thomas A. McCann (unknown – March 13, 1932) was an American football coach. He served as the head football coach at Bowdoin College from 1913 to 1914 and at the University of Maine in 1917, compiling a career college football record of 6–13–1. Before coaching at Bowdoin, McCann coached football at Bangor High School in Bangor, Maine.

== Biography ==
McCann graduated from Bangor High School and attended Manhattan College. He was the head football coach at Bangor High from 1902 to 1912 and won the New England football championship during his final season. After two years at Bowdoin, he returned to BHS. In 1917, he coached the football team at the University of Maine, then returned for his third stint at BHS. He was an official from 1920 to 1922 and finished his coaching career in 1923 at Brewer High School in Brewer, Maine. He then worked as a foreman in a Bangor cigar factory.

McCann died of a heart attack on March 13, 1932 at his home in Bangor. He was survived by his wife and four children.

== Head coaching record ==
=== College ===
Year	Team	Overall	Conference	Standing	Bowl/playoffs
Bowdoin Polar Bears (Maine Intercollegiate Athletic Association) (1913–1914)
1913	Bowdoin	3–4–1			
1914	Bowdoin	2–6			
Bowdoin:		5–10–1			
Maine Black Bears (Maine Intercollegiate Athletic Association) (1917)
1917	Maine	1–3	1–1		
Maine:		1–3	1–1		
Total:		6–13–1			
