= Maine Intercollegiate Athletic Association =

Athletic association (1893–1973)

The Maine Intercollegiate Athletic Association, also known as the Maine Intercollegiate Athletic Conference, was an intercollegiate athletic football conference that existed from 1893 to 1973. The conference's four members were all located in the state of Maine. Maine was a joint member of the MIAA and the Yankee Conference from 1947 to 1964; the remaining three colleges now constitute the Colby-Bates-Bowdoin Consortium and compete in the New England Small College Athletic Conference.

== Members ==
Institution	Location	Founded	Joined	Left	Type	Nickname	Colors	Current conference
Bates College	Lewiston, Maine	1855	1893	1973	Private	Bobcats		NESCAC (NCAA Division III)
Bowdoin College	Brunswick, Maine	1794	1893	1973	Private	Polar Bears		NESCAC (NCAA Division III)
Colby College	Waterville, Maine	1813	1893	1973	Private	Mules		NESCAC (NCAA Division III)
University of Maine	Orono, Maine	1865	1893	1965	Public	Black Bears		America East (NCAA Division I FCS)

== Champions ==
- 1893 – Bowdoin
- 1894 – Bowdoin
- 1895 – Bowdoin
- 1896 – Bowdoin
- 1897 – Bates and Colby
- 1898 – Bates
- 1899 – Bates
- 1900 – Bates & Bowdoin
- 1901 – Maine
- 1902 – Maine
- 1903 – Maine
- 1904 – Bowdoin
- 1905 – Maine
- 1906 – Bates
- 1907 – Bowdoin
- 1908 – Bowdoin & Colby
- 1909 – Colby
- 1910 – Bowdoin
- 1911 – Maine
- 1912 – Maine
- 1913 – Maine
- 1914 – Colby
- 1915 – Maine
- 1916 – Colby
- 1917 – Bowdoin
- 1918 – No champion
- 1919 – Maine
- 1920 – Maine
- 1921 – Bowdoin
- 1922 – Maine
- 1923 – Colby
- 1924 – Maine
- 1925 – Maine
- 1926 – Maine
- 1927 – Colby and Maine
- 1928 – Colby and Maine
- 1929 – Bates
- 1930 – Bates
- 1931 – Maine
- 1932 – Maine
- 1933 – Maine
- 1934 – Maine
- 1935 – Bowdoin
- 1936 – Bowdoin
- 1937 – Bowdoin
- 1938 – Bowdoin and Colby
- 1939 – Bowdoin and Colby
- 1940 – Bowdoin and Colby
- 1941 – Colby
- 1942 – Bowdoin
- 1943 – No champion
- 1944 – No champion
- 1945 – No champion
- 1946 – Bates
- 1947 – Maine
- 1948 – Bates, Bowdoin, and Maine
- 1949 – Bowdoin
- 1950 – Bowdoin and Maine
- 1951 – Maine
- 1952 – Bowdoin
- 1953 – Maine
- 1954 – Maine
- 1955 – Maine
- 1956 – Bates
- 1957 – Bates, Colby, and Maine
- 1958 – Colby
- 1959 – Colby
- 1960 – Bowdoin
- 1961 – Maine
- 1962 – Maine
- 1963 – Bowdoin
- 1964 – Maine
- 1965 – Bates, Bowdoin, and Colby
- 1966 – Bates
- 1967 – Bates
- 1968 – Bowdoin
- 1969 – Bowdoin
- 1970 – Bowdoin
- 1971 – Bowdoin
- 1972 – Colby
- 1973 – Bowdoin

== See also ==
- List of defunct college football conferences
