= 1890 East End Gyms football season =

American football team season

1890 East End Gyms football
- Record: 0–2
- Captain: George S. Proctor
- Home field: None

The 1890 East End Gyms football season was the first season of competition for the American football team representing the East End Gymnastic Club of Pittsburgh, Pennsylvania, later known as the Pittsburgh Athletic Club. The team played only two known games, losing both.

== Season summary ==
The multi-sport club familiarly known as the East End "Gyms" organized its first football team by mid-October, 1890. While the team awaited its first official game, several of its members gained experience with a local pick-up squad dubbed the "All-Pittsburghs". George Proctor, Grant Dibert, and L. F. Kirchner, the Gyms' physical education instructor, were among the East End players who participated in the All-Pittsburghs' 22–6 loss to the Allegheny Athletic Association. By the end of October, Proctor, a halfback, was elected captain of the Gyms.

The inaugural game for the East End club was slated for Saturday, November 1 against Shady Side Academy, a local prep-school team. The Shady Side players backed out of the game after resolving to play football exclusively under association rules (soccer). The Gyms thus had to delay their debut until the following Saturday.

On November 8, the East Enders went to Washington, Pennsylvania, to play Washington & Jefferson College, which was coming off a dominant win against Western University of Pennsylvania (later known as the University of Pittsburgh). After a scoreless first half, Washington & Jefferson pulled ahead to win 10–0. The Pittsburgh Press called the game "the most exciting match" ever held in Washington.

The team played its only other known game of the season on Thanksgiving, losing 10–8 to the Indiana Normal School at Indiana, Pennsylvania. The Indiana County Gazette, in its game report, accused the referee of unfairly prolonging the game to allow East End an opportunity to make the winning score.

== Schedule ==
Date	Opponent	Site	Result	Source
November 8	at Washington & Jefferson	Washington, PA	L 0–10	
November 27	at Indiana Normal	Fair Grounds; Indiana, PA	L 8–10	
