= Pittsburgh Stock Exchange =

Stock market in Pennsylvania, US, 1864–1974

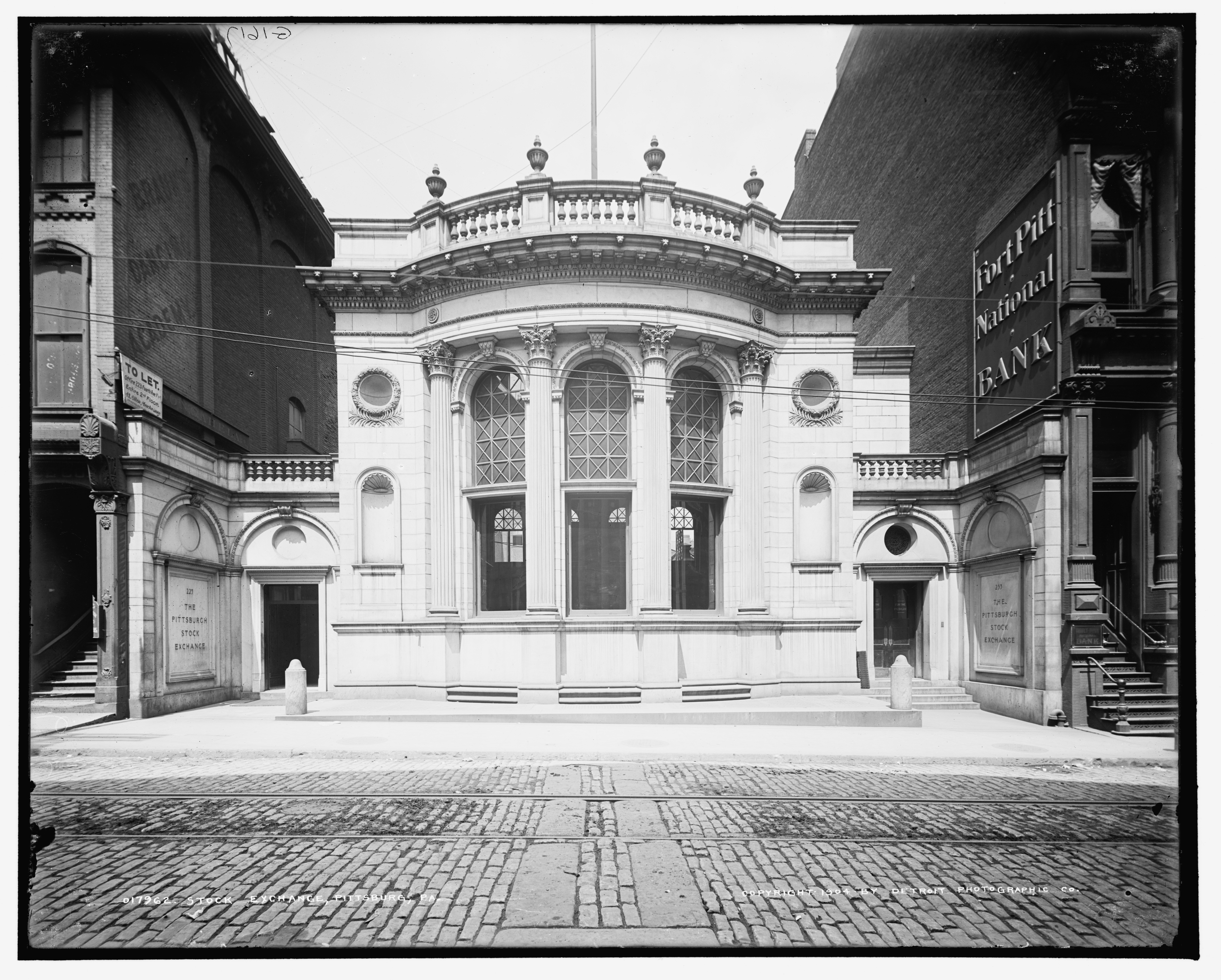
- Type: Stock exchange
- Location: Pittsburgh, Pennsylvania, United States
- Founded: November 11, 1864 (as Thurston's Oil Exchange)
- Closed: August 23, 1974
- Key people: John Baxter Barbour, Jr.
- Currency: United States dollar

The Pittsburgh Stock Exchange was a large regional stock market located in Pittsburgh, Pennsylvania from November 11, 1864 (originally as Thurston's Oil Exchange) until closing on August 23, 1974. It was alternatively named the Pittsburgh Coal Exchange starting on May 27, 1870, and the Pittsburgh Oil Exchange on July 21, 1878 with 180 members. On July 25, 1896 the Exchange formally took the name Pittsburgh Stock Exchange though it had been referred to by that name since the spring of 1894. The Exchange, like many modern day exchanges, was forced to close during sharp economic crashes or crises. On December 24, 1969 The Philadelphia-Baltimore-Washington Stock Exchange bought the Pittsburgh Stock Exchange. At its height the exchange traded over 1,200 companies, but by the last trading day in 1974 only Pittsburgh Brewing Company, Williams & Company and Westinghouse remained listed.

== History ==
=== Oil and Coal Exchange ===
The Pittsburgh Stock Exchange was formed in 1864 as the "Oil Exchange." The Pittsburgh Stock Exchange was initially been Thurston's Oil Exchange, a large regional stock market located in Pittsburgh, Pennsylvania starting on November 11, 1864, on Fourth Street, downtown. The exchange was built on the oil traded at Pittsburgh during the Civil War with the creation of Thurston's Oil Exchange.

It was alternatively named the Pittsburgh Coal Exchange starting on May 27, 1870, after the Pittsburgh Coal Exchange was chartered "for coal companies engaged in river transportation" that January.

The Coal Exchange changed its name to the Pittsburgh Oil Exchange in 1878. After many oil exchanges were being consolidated by Standard Oil, the exchange became known as the Pittsburgh Oil Exchange on July 21, 1878 with 180 members.

=== Open for general stocks ===
The Pittsburgh Coal Exchange opened for all general stocks by 1894, and in April 1894, the exchange began using the title Pittsburgh Stock Exchange. The exchange began officially operating under that name on July 25, 1896.

The building of the Pittsburgh Stock Exchange was destroyed in a fire on October 29, 1896.

=== Closings ===
The exchange was forced to close several times during sharp economic crashes or crises. October 23, 1907, it closed for three months due to the 1907 recession.

During World War I the market closed for four months starting on July 31, 1914, due to economic effects of the war.

With the Pittsburgh Stock Exchange closing that day, on March 5, 1933 President Roosevelt announced a bank holiday as both Mellon Financial and PNC Bank with the Pittsburgh Stock Exchange all left nervous account holders waiting outside locked doors.

=== Final years ===
On April 5, 1966 the New York Stock Exchange responded to the Regional Industrial Development Corporation's invitation to relocate to Pittsburgh, with the NYSE promising that the city was under consideration.

On December 24, 1969, The Philadelphia-Baltimore-Washington Stock Exchange bought the Pittsburgh Stock Exchange with the commitment to keep the trading floor operational in the city, yet a national economic downturn and increased computerization and centralization led to the Exchange closing after trading ended at 3 PM on August 23, 1974.

At its height the exchange traded over 1,200 companies but by the last trading day in 1974 only Pittsburgh Brewing Company, Williams & Company and Westinghouse remained listed. A total of 11 companies traded the last day with 3,100 shares.

The stock exchange closed its Fourth Avenue "financial district" doors in August 1974 after computerization had consolidated trades in New York, Chicago, and other global centers. Some academics posit the exchange closed due to an extended national bear market and increased computerization that would eventually centralize much regional stock market trading to New York City.

== Locations ==
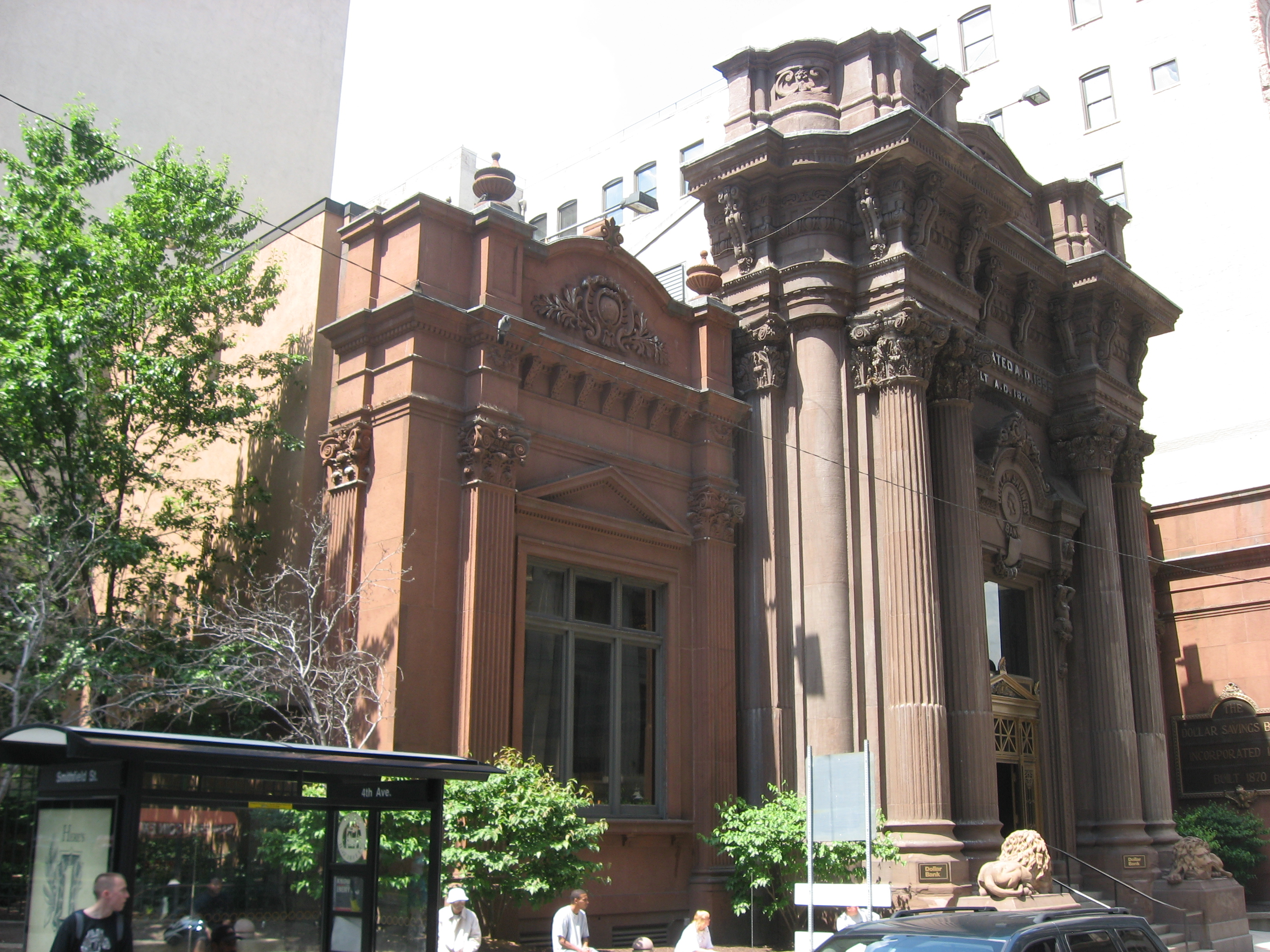
Pre-1903 location on Fourth Avenue

From April 1, 1903 until October 1962 the stock exchange was located at 229 Fourth Avenue. From October 1962 until it closed in August 1974 it was located at the two-story 8,500 square foot structure at 333 Fourth Avenue. Prior to 1903 it was located in rented quarters of the Pittsburgh Bank for Savings on the corner of Fourth Avenue and Smithfield Street. After the exchange closed, the 1962–1974 structure was purchased by Point Park University on November 1, 2006 for $645,000.

== Executives ==
John Baxter Barbour, Jr. (April 16, 1862–March 11, 1929) was president of the Pittsburgh Stock Exchange for eight terms. Barbour was elected to membership in the Oil Exchange when he was nineteen years of age, and of the Pittsburgh Stock Exchange, was one of the organizers and a charter member. He became president in 1911. On May 3, 1916, he was again elected president. For two terms he was treasurer of the Pittsburgh Petroleum, Stock and Metal Exchange.

On June 7, 1936 Pittsburgh Stock Exchange secretary Paul Leitch died suddenly at 36 from a heart attack.

== See also ==
- List of former stock exchanges in the Americas
- List of stock exchange mergers in the Americas
- List of stock exchanges
- Economy of Pittsburgh
- Pittsburgh in the American Civil War
- Fourth Avenue Historic District
- Etymology of Pittsburgh
