= 1891 East End Gyms football season =

American football team season

1891 East End Gyms football
- Record: 6–0
- Manager: L. F. Kirchner
- Captain: George S. Proctor
- Home field: Liberty Park

The 1891 East End Gyms football season was the second season of competition for the American football team representing the East End Gymnastic Club (renamed the Pittsburgh Athletic Club the next year). In six documented games, the team had a record of 6–0. Halfback George S. Proctor was captain and lineman L. F. Kirchner was manager. The home field was Liberty Park, later known as P.A.C. Park, located at Larimer Avenue and Shetland Street on the east side of Pittsburgh.

The team claimed the unofficial championship of Western Pennsylvania, a claim endorsed by The Pittsburg Dispatch sports editor John D. Pringle.

== Schedule ==
Date	Opponent	Site	Result	Source
September 26	Western University of Pennsylvania	Liberty Park; Pittsburgh, PA	W 4–0	
October 3	Shady Side Academy	Pittsburgh, PA	W 26–0	
October 31	Washington & Jefferson	Liberty Park; Pittsburgh, PA	W 14–0	
November 7	Western University of Pennsylvania	Liberty Park; Pittsburgh, PA	W 24–0	
November 14	Altoona Athletic Association	Liberty Park; Pittsburgh, PA	W 20–0	
November 26	Shortlidge Media Academy	Liberty Park; Pittsburgh, PA	W 30–12	

According to a publication by the Professional Football Researchers Association, "it is believed" that two additional games, against Greensburg and Indiana Normal School, took place and that East End won. The team's 1891 record as listed in an 1896 Pittsburgh Post article does not include these two games. An article in the Pittsburgh Press of November 24, 1891 reported that one attempt by the club to add late-season games against Greensburg and Indiana Normal (among other teams) was unsuccessful.
