= Pittsburgh Athletic Club (football) =

American football team

Logo

General information
- Founded: 1890; 136 years ago
- Folded: 1898; 128 years ago
- Stadium: P.A.C. Park (Note: At the corner of Larimer Avenue and Shetland Street in Pittsburgh.)
- Headquartered: Pittsburgh, Pennsylvania, United States
- Colors: Red (crimson) and white

Team history
- Pittsburgh Athletic Club (1892–1898); East End Gymnastic Club (1890–1891)

League / conference affiliations
- Independent

The Pittsburgh Athletic Club (Note: The club legally registered its name as "Pittsburgh Athletic Club" in 1892, but since the name of Pittsburgh was commonly spelled without the 'h' during the club's existence, the club name often appeared as "Pittsburg Athletic Club".) football team, established in 1890, was based in Pittsburgh, Pennsylvania. In 1892 the intense competition between two Pittsburgh-area clubs, the Allegheny Athletic Association and the Pittsburgh Athletic Club, led to William (Pudge) Heffelfinger becoming the first known professional football player. Heffelfinger was paid $500 by Allegheny to play in a game against Pittsburgh on November 12, 1892. As a result, Heffelfinger became the first person to be paid to play football. Allegheny would go on to win the game, 4–0, when Heffelfinger picked up a Pittsburgh fumble and ran it 35 yards for a touchdown. In 1893, Pittsburgh again made history when it signed one of its players, probably halfback Grant Dibert, to the first known pro football contract, which covered all of the team's games for the year.

== History ==
=== Origins ===
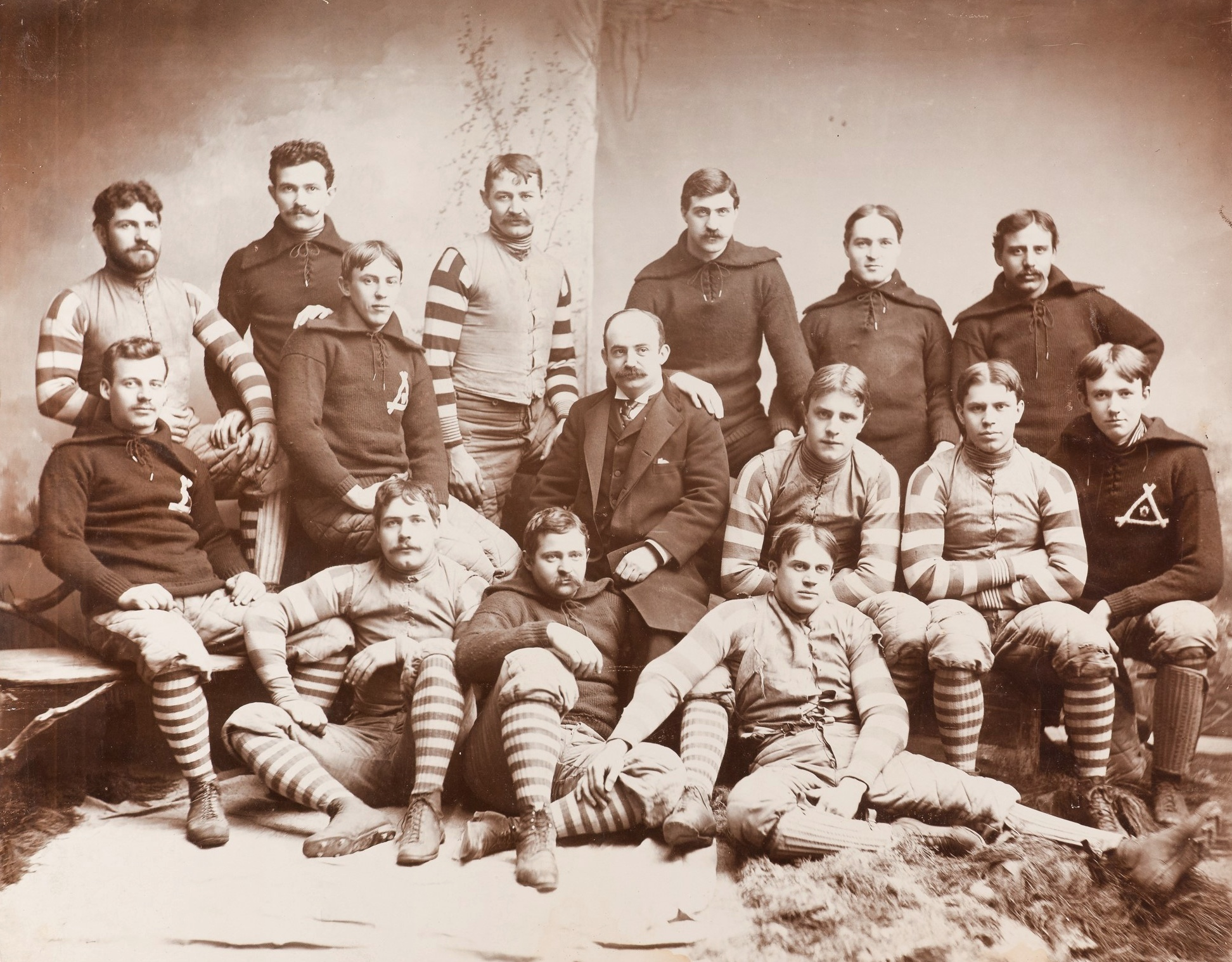
1893 Pittsburgh Athletic Club football team

In 1890 the Pittsburgh Athletic Club, then called the East End Gymnastic Club, decided to field a football team. Their rival, the Allegheny Athletic Association, started up a football team in the same year that brought a lot of publicity to their club. In most sports, Allegheny provided little competition for the older East End Gymnastic Club. However, in 1890, Allegheny found that it could compete in football. The team soon gave the Allegheny Athletic Association a strong following. The Association's focus on football increased the prestige of the club, which led to an increase in their membership. Soon Allegheny's membership expanded to more than 330 persons and now equalled East End's.

During the late 1800s, if an athletic club exhibited signs of fame and glory, increased revenues to the club soon followed. Therefore, publicity, and football victories, were important to the clubs and new members were attracted to clubs with stature. The quest for club prestige led to the recruiting of football players, at first with indirect financial inducements. The East Ends formed their team around the clubs physical director, L. F. Kirchner, a lineman. During Kirchner's stint with the football team, it was noted in the Pittsburgh newspapers that Kirchner's salary nearly doubled during football season, while his classes he taught at the club were cut in half. The papers at times hinted to Kirchner's suspiciously professional status, although no one accused him outright.

=== 1890–1891 ===
After a shaky first season in which they played (and lost) only two known games (against Washington & Jefferson College and Indiana Normal School), the East Enders found their footing, completing their second season with a 6–0 record. Harry Fry, who held memberships at both Allegheny and the East End, chose to play for the East Enders, and his performance in the 1891 season opener earned the respect of the local press. After their undefeated season, each member of the East End team was presented with a gold watch in the shape of a miniature football which also served as a trophy. However, when play began the East End and Allegheny did not play each other. Efforts were made by local media to schedule a game between the two clubs. However O. D. Thompson, Allegheny's manager, carefully avoided a game. He feared a one-sided loss to Pittsburgh because his team lacked the time needed to practice together that the East End team already had. However a game would occur in 1892.

=== Issues with professionalism ===
The first game between Allegheny and the now renamed Pittsburgh Athletic Club was played on Columbus Day 1892 in East Liberty. The game ended in a tie: 6–6. There were accusations of dirty play and unprofessionalism, that added fuel to an already bitter rivalry. Pittsburgh accused Allegheny of purposely trying to injure Kirchner, who had been forced out of the game with an ankle injury. Meanwhile, Allegheny countered that Kirchner was a professional and should not have been playing anyway. Allegheny even announced it was willing to bet anyone that Pittsburgh had used a pro, other than Kirchner. In fact, the team's captain, Charley Aull, found Pittsburgh a new center prior to the team's game against Allegheny, when he supposedly ran into an old friend on the street known only as "Stayer". A few weeks after the game, it was discovered that "Stayer" was actually A. C. Read, the captain of the Penn State Nittany Lions football team. While no one could prove that Read had been paid, and Pittsburgh had not tried to present him as a member, his presence escalated the situation. Now neither club would hesitate to take the final step to professionalism.

A rematch was scheduled for that November at Recreation Park, which is not far from where Heinz Field stands today. The spot is marked by a historic marker. In preparation, both clubs went into full-scale behind-the-scenes talks with the top players of the era to strengthen their teams. Cash offers and other inducements were made to players from New York City to Chicago.

=== First professional player ===
The first known professional player was William "Pudge" Heffelfinger, an All-American guard from Yale. Heffelfinger was paid $500 (US dollars) to play for Allegheny against Pittsburgh on November 12, 1892. Heffelfinger, who was working as a railroad clerk in Chicago, and playing for Chicago Athletic Association Football team between arguments with its management, had earlier turned down an offer to play for the Pittsburgh Athletic Club for $250. This set off quite a controversy as Pittsburgh protested the presence of Heffelfinger and other Chicago players. Allegheny retaliated with the fact that Pittsburgh had imported players as well. Allegheny won the game 4–0, in front of 3,000 spectators, when Heffelfinger picked up a fumble, that he forced himself, and ran it in for a touchdown.

It later turned out that Heffelfinger received $500 plus $25 in expenses for the game. Two of his Chicago teammates received “liberal” expense money. Thus, William (Pudge) Heffelfinger now is acknowledged as the first professional football player anywhere.

=== First pro football contract ===
In 1893, the Allegheny and Pittsburgh split two games, with the Pittsburgh winning 6–0 at Exposition Park and the Alleghenys winning, 8–4, in East Liberty. The year was far more significant for several other reasons, however. On October 4, Pittsburgh signed a player to a formal pro football contract which stated that the player must participate in all Pittsburgh games and will not play for anyone else during those games. In return the player was paid $50 per game by the Pittsburgh club. While contract has been torn at the signature line, it is believed that the first contracted player was Grant Dibert who played halfback and was a member of the Pittsburgh A. C. since 1890.

=== 1894–1898 ===
Pittsburgh continued to play until 1898. The club lost its major rival, Allegheny, when the Amateur Athletic Union suspended the Allegheny team for its flagrant violations of amateur rules. After Allegheny's strong seasons in 1894 and 1896, the pro football turmoil had upset the Allegheny club so greatly that the sport was dropped. By that time the new Duquesne Country and Athletic Club in Pittsburgh, and the Latrobe and Greensburg clubs in neighboring Westmoreland County, had become potent forces in western Pennsylvania football. The PAC repeatedly failed to beat its in-city rival Duquesne, and in 1898 was routed by them 34–0 and 27–0. Pittsburgh finally decided the cost of paying football players only to watch them lose to Duquesne was a poor investment for the club's treasury. They quietly disappeared from the Pittsburgh football scene.

== Season by season ==
Season	Won	Lost	Tied	Points for	Points against	Captain	Coach	Manager
1890	0	2	0	8	20	George S. Proctor	none known	none known
1891	6	0	0	118	12	George S. Proctor	none known	L. F. Kirchner
1892	3	3	1	68	53	Charley Aull	none known	John B. Barbour Jr.
1893	7	2	0	108	34	Charley Aull	none known	John B. Barbour Jr.
1894	6	4	0	118	70	Clarence Lomax	none known	Douglas Buchanan
1895	7	1	2	183	24	Tommy Roderick	Harmon S. Graves	Paul Myler
1896	2	5	3	54	73	George W. Ritchey	George Hoskins	James Carothers
1897	5	5	0	116	95	G. W. Ritchey, J. P. Brownlee	George Hoskins	Bob Hamilton, W. H. Hastings
1898	4	3	2	58	78	Sam Boyle	Sam Boyle	F. K. Gray
