= Investment Building (Pittsburgh) =

The Investment Building
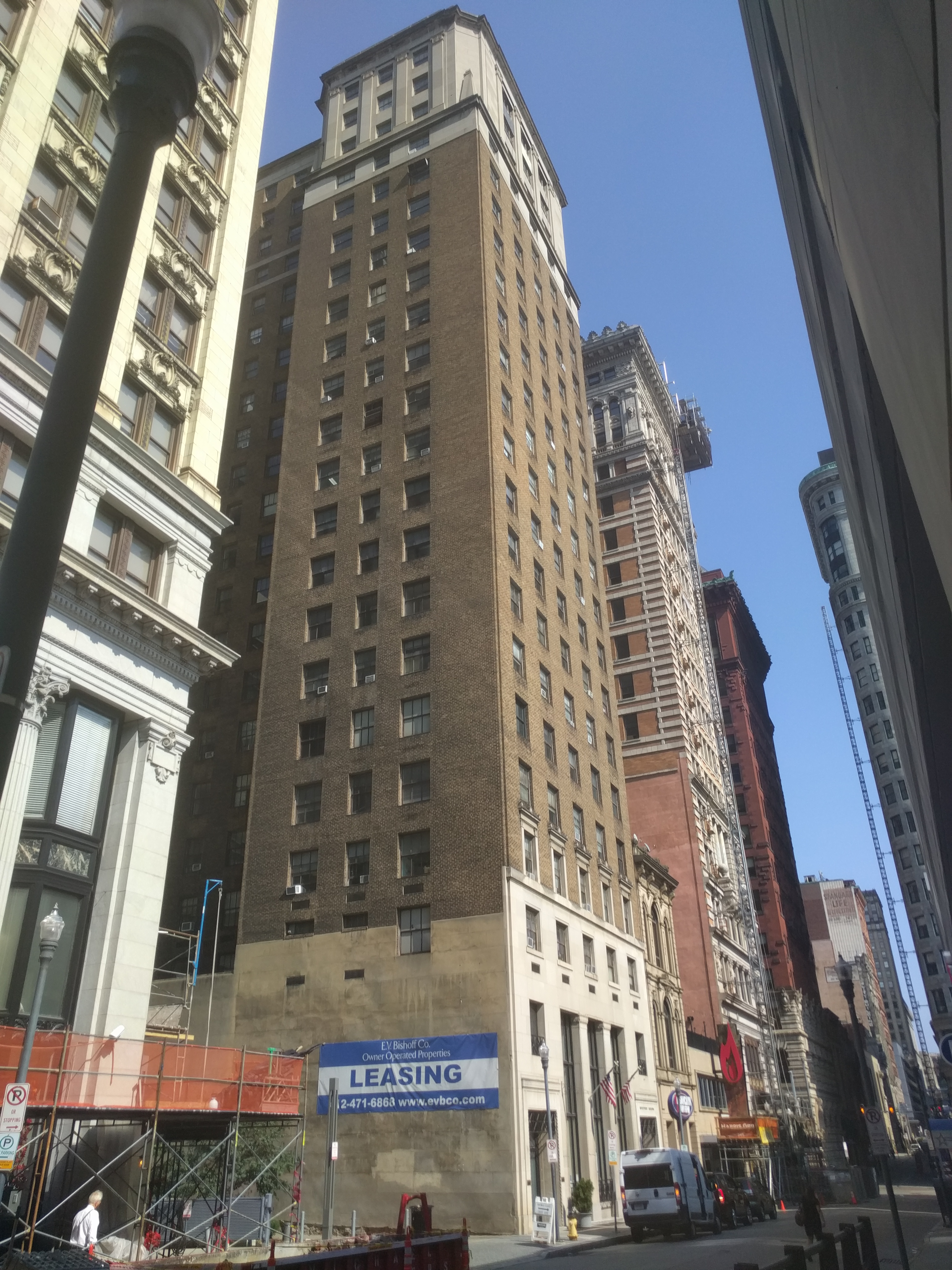

- Location within Pittsburgh

General information
- Type: Office
- Location: 239 4th Avenue, Pittsburgh, Pennsylvania, United States
- Coordinates: 40.4397°N 80.0018°W
- Completed: 1927

Height
- Roof: 230 ft (70 m)

Technical details
- Floor count: 21

Design and construction
- Architect: John M. Donn

The Investment Building is a 1927 neo-classical skyscraper in Pittsburgh, Pennsylvania which is located at 239 Fourth Avenue and part of the Fourth Avenue Historic District. The original name of the structure was the Insurance Exchange Building.

== History and architectural features ==
Designed by John M. Donn, a Washington, D.C. architect, the tower is of the same approximate façade dimensions as its 4th Avenue neighbors the Arrott Building and Benedum-Trees Building, both built a generation earlier. Built from limestone and a darker, more textured brick, the tower is noted for its simplicity and lightness of form and detailing. The roof corners feature chamfered obelisk-like elements.
