= Sam Kee Building =

Narrow building in Vancouver, Canada

- 三記號大樓
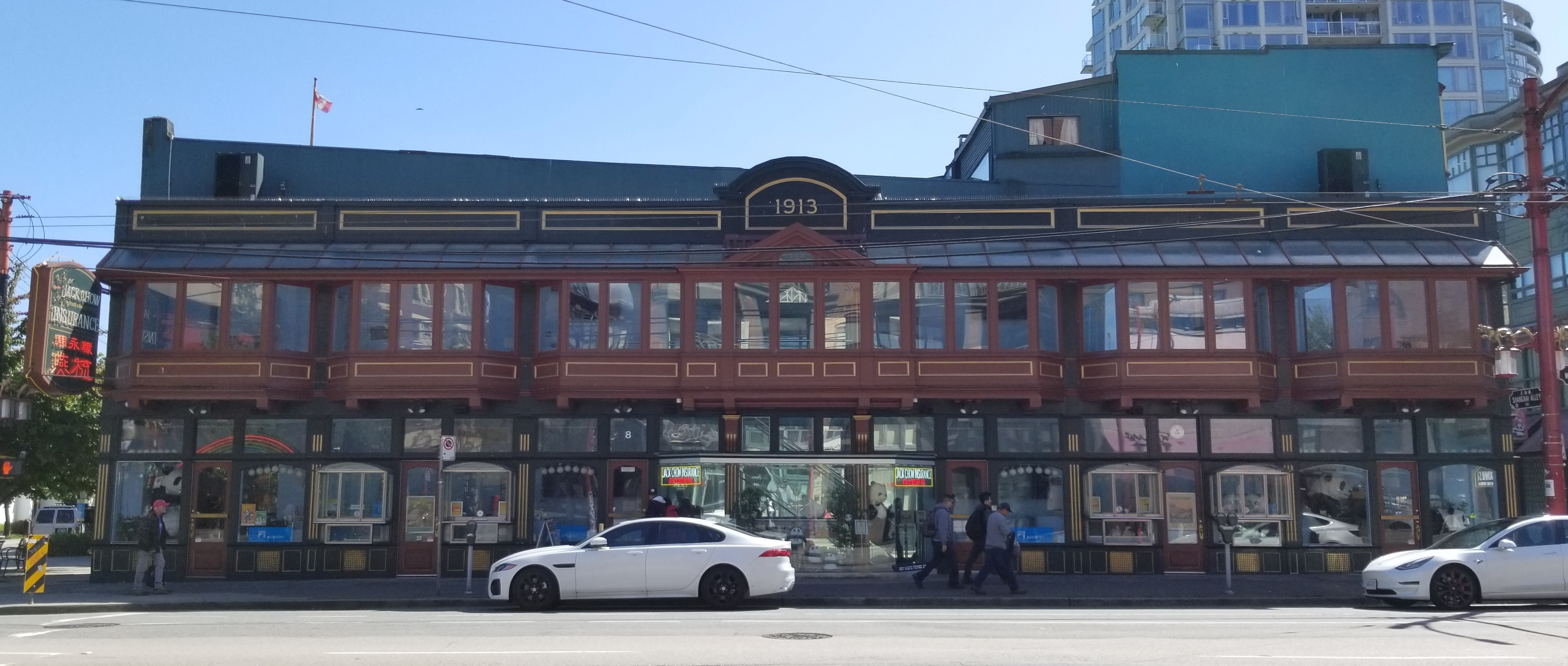
- The Sam Kee Building in 2024
- Alternative names: Jack Chow Insurance Building

General information
- Location: 8 West Pender Street, Vancouver, British Columbia, Canada
- Coordinates: 49°16′50″N 123°06′17″W
- Named for: Sam Kee Company
- Year built: 1913; 113 years ago
- Cost: CA$8,000
- Owner: Jack Chow Insurance (since 1985)

Dimensions
- Other dimensions: Ground floor depth: 4 ft 11 in (1.50 m); Upper floor depth: 6 ft (1.8 m); Lot area: 571.8 sq ft (53.12 m^{2})

Technical details
- Floor count: 2 (+ 1 basement)

Design and construction
- Architects: Kennerly Bryan; William C. F. Gillam
- Architecture firm: Bryan & Gillam

National Historic Site of Canada
- Designated: January 14, 2003
- Reference no.: 2814

Chinese name
- Traditional Chinese: 三記號大樓
- Simplified Chinese: 三记号大楼
Transcriptions
Standard Mandarin
- Hanyu Pinyin: Sān Jìhào Dàlóu
- Wade–Giles: San^{1} Chi-^{4}hao^{4} Ta^{4}-lou^{2}
Yue: Cantonese
- Yale Romanization: Sāam Geihouh Daaihlàuh
- Jyutping: Saam^{1} Gei^{3}hou^{6} Daai^{6}lau^{4*2}
other Yue
- Taishanese: Lham^{1} Gi^{1}hau^{5} Ai^{5}leu^{3}

The Sam Kee Building (Chinese: 三記號大樓), also known as the Jack Chow Insurance Building, is a two-storey commercial building in Vancouver, British Columbia, Canada, located near the entrance to the city's Chinatown. It is noted for its narrow depth, which varies by floor. The ground floor is 4 feet 11 inches (1.50 m) wide, while the upper floor spans 6 feet (1.8 m) because of its overhanging bay windows. Additionally, a basement extends under the sidewalk adjacent to the storefront. This discrepancy has led to a dispute with the Skinny Building in Pittsburgh, Pennsylvania, over which commercial building is more narrow, as the Skinny Building has a consistent depth of 5 feet 2 inches (1.57 m). Nonetheless, the Sam Kee Building is recognized by Guinness World Records as the narrowest commercial building in the world and by Ripley's Believe It or Not! as the world's thinnest building.

The building was constructed as a spite house in 1913, in defiance of Vancouver City Council's decision to expropriate without compensation a lot belonging to local business magnate Chang Toy, also known as "Sam Kee". Located at the corner of Carrall Street and Pender Street, the depth of the original lot was reduced from roughly 30 feet (9.1 m) to 6 feet (1.8 m) for the widening of the latter street. Chang bet a business associate that he could construct a building on the land that remained and the Sam Kee Building was completed a year later. It originally consisted of a ground floor housing retail shops, an upper floor housing residential and organizational units, and a basement containing public baths.

Local businessman Jack Chow purchased the Sam Kee Building in 1985 and restored the property the following year. The building has since become a tourist attraction, although an insurance business still operates on the ground floor. It is considered a cultural heritage site by the municipal government and is listed in the Canadian Register of Historic Places.

== Architecture ==
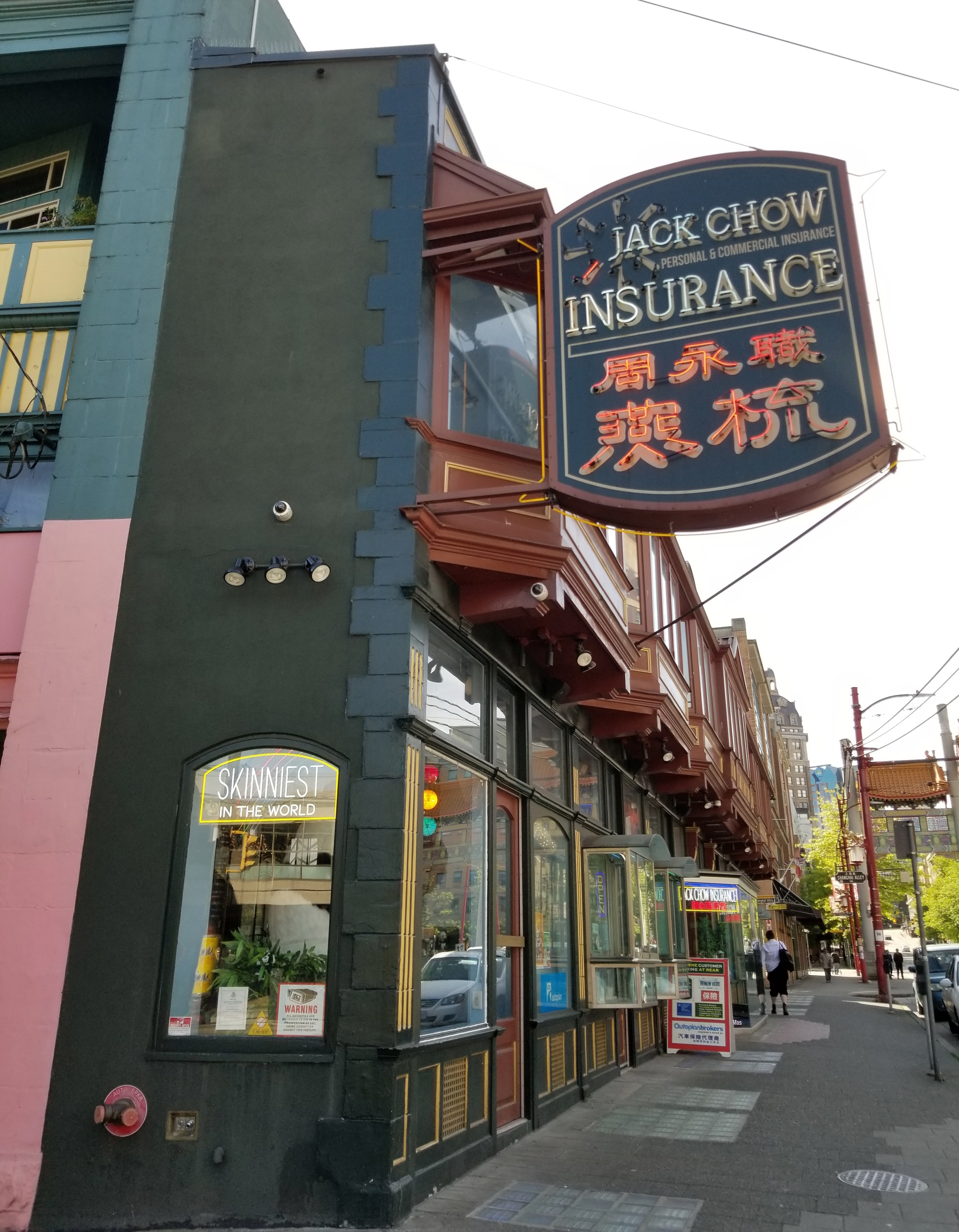
Side view of the Sam Kee Building from Carrall Street. The Jack Chow Insurance sign is wider than the building (excluding the bay windows).

The Sam Kee Building is a steel-framed, two-storey building with an unusually narrow depth. Its ground-floor depth measures 4 feet 11 inches (1.50 m). Its upper-floor depth is wider at 6 feet (1.8 m) due to its overhanging bay windows. Bay windows were a common Western feature of late 19th-century and early 20th-century Chinatown structures (the Sam Kee Building was built in 1913) because they increased interior floor space. The building also has a basement that extends 10 feet (3.0 m) under the sidewalk of Pender Street. The three floors are connected by glass staircases, which the municipal government disapproves of because they are a potential fire hazard.

=== Dispute with Vancouver City Council ===
Local historians have described the Sam Kee Building as a "spite house", a building constructed or modified to anger neighbours or other stakeholders. The municipal government previously charged the building's owner – the Sam Kee Company and later Jack Chow Insurance – annual encroachment fees for the airspace used by the protruding windows and the under-street area used by the basement.

In November 1996, Vancouver City Council voted to retroactively reduce the encroachment fees, but Jack Chow Insurance responded by refusing to pay the fees and applied for them to be waived altogether. In support of their application, the company cited the building's heritage value and status as a tourist attraction and Guinness World Record holder. City council voted to waive the CA$2,500 fee for the basement in November 1998 and the CA$260 fee for the windows in December. Rod Chow, son of Jack Chow, described the latter decision as "the moral support of [city] council" being given to the building and the hopeful end of an "85-year feud". Before their final vote on the matter, city council acknowledged the main argument against the waiver, that because Jack Chow Insurance was "us[ing] the encroachment space to generate revenue", a waiver would therefore be against "the principles of equity amongst similar uses ... for commercial activities on city property".

== History ==
Vancouver's Chinatown was home to the largest Chinese community in Canada during the early 1900s, with 3,559 residents listed in the 1911 national census. The Vancouver Asiatic Exclusion League, an all-European lobbyist group opposed to immigration from Asia, was established in 1907 with the goal of expelling Asians from the city. In 1912, the league convinced Vancouver City Council to widen Pender Street, the main street of Chinatown at the time, in order to render Chinese-owned lots on the street unsuitable for commercial use. One such lot, located at the corner of Carrall Street and Pender Street, was owned by local businessman Chang Toy (陳才; 1857–1921), known in the European community as "Sam Kee" (三記).

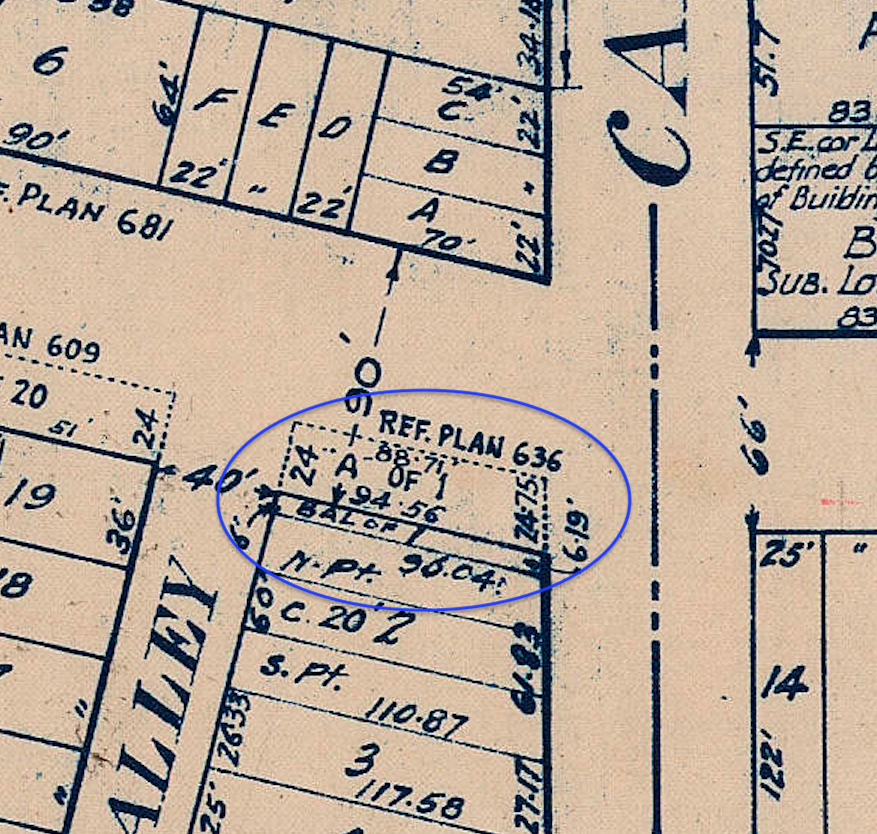
1917 map showing the dimensions of the lot before and after expropriation. The remaining lot is labelled "BAL OF 1".

Chang purchased the original, standard-sized lot for his primary business, the Sam Kee Company, in 1903. The original lot was a trapezoid measuring 30 by 88.71 by 30.94 by 96.04 feet (9.14 m × 27.04 m × 9.43 m × 29.27 m). Its southern and eastern sides were slightly longer than its northern and western sides, respectively. By 1907, the Sam Kee Company had become one of the four main firms operating in Chinatown. It operated an extensive import-export business that involved members of the Anglo-European business establishment.

In 1912, Vancouver City Council expropriated most of the lot without compensating Chang. The width of the lot was reduced from roughly 30 feet (9.1 m) to 6 feet (1.8 m), making conventional commercial use of the remaining frontage impractical. However, Chang bet a business associate that he could nonetheless construct a building on what remained of his lot.

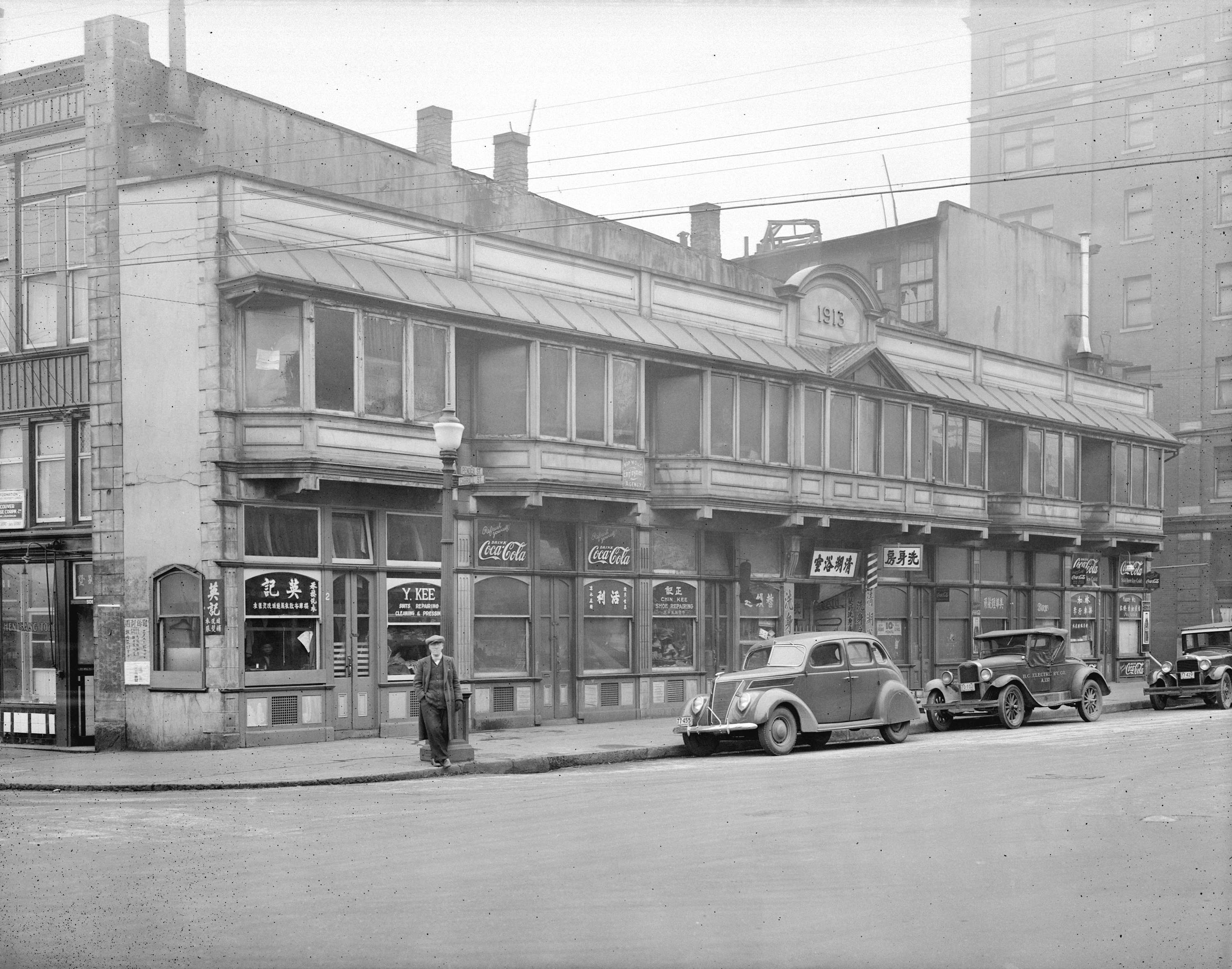
The Sam Kee Building in 1937

Chang hired architects Kennerly Bryan and William C. F. Gillam, eponymous partners of the Bryan & Gillam firm, to design a building for his narrow lot. On March 27, 1913, a building permit was issued for a building "6.19 feet in width, 96.04 feet in length". The Sam Kee Building was completed later that year and reportedly cost CA$8,000. For half a century, the Sam Kee Building saw mixed commercial-residential use. Retail shops were located on the ground floor, while the upper floor housed units for residential and organizational use. The basement contained public baths.

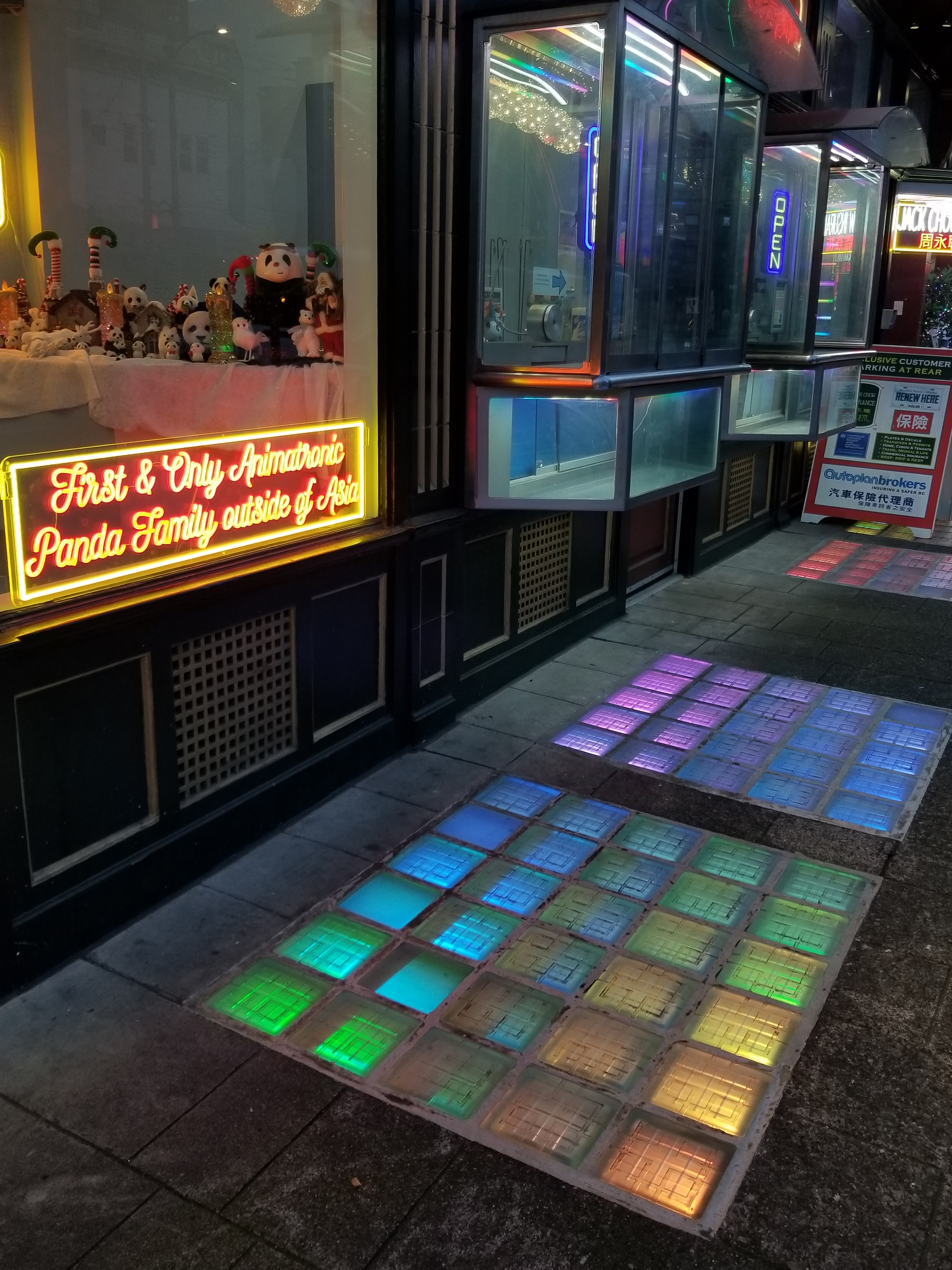
The glass blocks at night

Local businessman Jack Wing Chow (周永職; 1930–2021) purchased the Sam Kee Building in 1985. Chow hired architect Soren Rasmussen to restore the building, and the renovations, which cost CA$250,000, were completed in 1986. Reinforced glass blocks were built into the sidewalk in front of the building, with the approval of Vancouver City Council. During nighttime, lights in the basement illuminate the sidewalk above, marking the entrance to Chinatown. Chow later received numerous heritage awards for his restoration initiative.

At present, the ground floor is used for insurance sales by Jack Chow Insurance, while the upper floor and basement are used primarily for tourism purposes. Most of the decorations and furniture inside the building are either "skinny or mini" to match the building's self-given title of "skinniest building in the world". In 2013, the building was given a million-dollar renovation. The project was financed by Jack Chow's retirement funds and a CA$100,000 grant from the municipal government. A glass window wicket was installed in 2016, allowing customers to be served on the sidewalk in front of the building and doubling the building's business capacity.

== Recognition ==
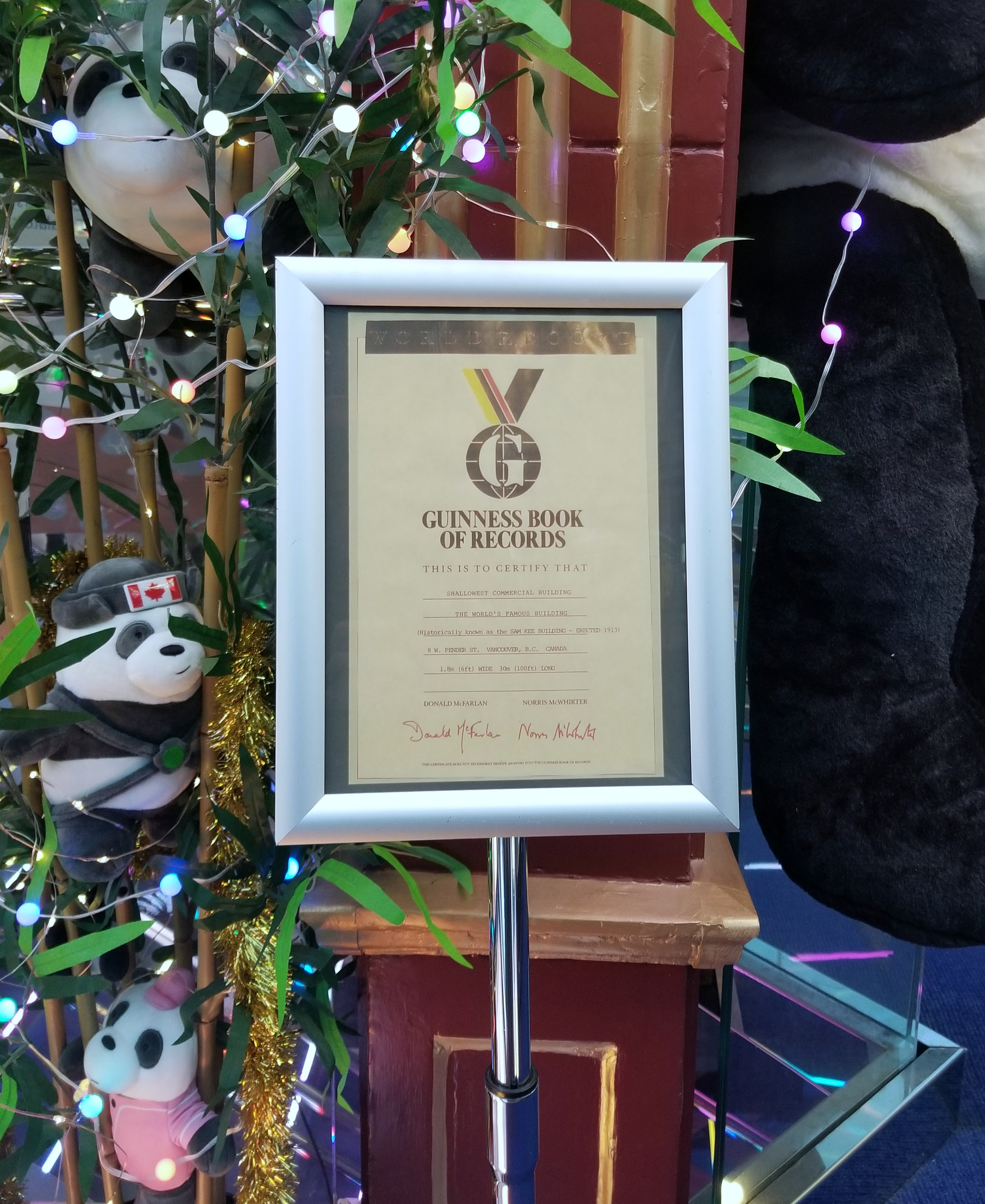
Physical copy of the Sam Kee Building's Guinness World Record

The Sam Kee Building holds the Guinness World Record for the narrowest commercial building in the world. Ripley's Believe it or Not!, meanwhile, recognizes it as the world's thinnest building. The ownership of these titles has been challenged by the owners of the Skinny Building in Pittsburgh, Pennsylvania, United States. The Skinny Building has a depth of 5 feet 2 inches (1.57 m) on all its floors, while the depth of the Sam Kee Building varies by floor, with the lower floor's depth measuring 4 feet 11 inches (1.50 m) but the upper floor's measuring 6 feet (1.8 m).

The municipal government formally recognized the Sam Kee Building as a cultural heritage site on January 14, 2003. It is listed number 2814 in the Canadian Register of Historic Places. Vancouver City Council's Chinatown Legacy Stewardship Group described the Sam Kee Building as a "key part of Chinatown's cultural heritage" and Jack Chow Insurance as a "legacy business".

The Sam Kee Building was one of two winners of the People's Choice Award for the 2017 Vancouver Heritage Awards, the other being the Mah Society Building. The award's description of the Sam Kee Building is as follows:

Fully restored and revitalized, the thinnest building in the world, and a Chinatown landmark and architectural marvel, its rehabilitation was part of the celebration of its centennial. This included its distinctive gold embellished columns, the prominent '1913' on its parapet, its continuous bay-windows, its block-long illuminated glass sidewalk, and iconic twinkling neon sign for the public to enjoy.

== See also ==
- Economic history of Vancouver
