= Fourth Avenue Historic District (Pittsburgh, Pennsylvania) =

Historic district in Pennsylvania, United States

- U.S. National Register of Historic Places
- U.S. Historic district
- Pittsburgh Landmark – PHLF
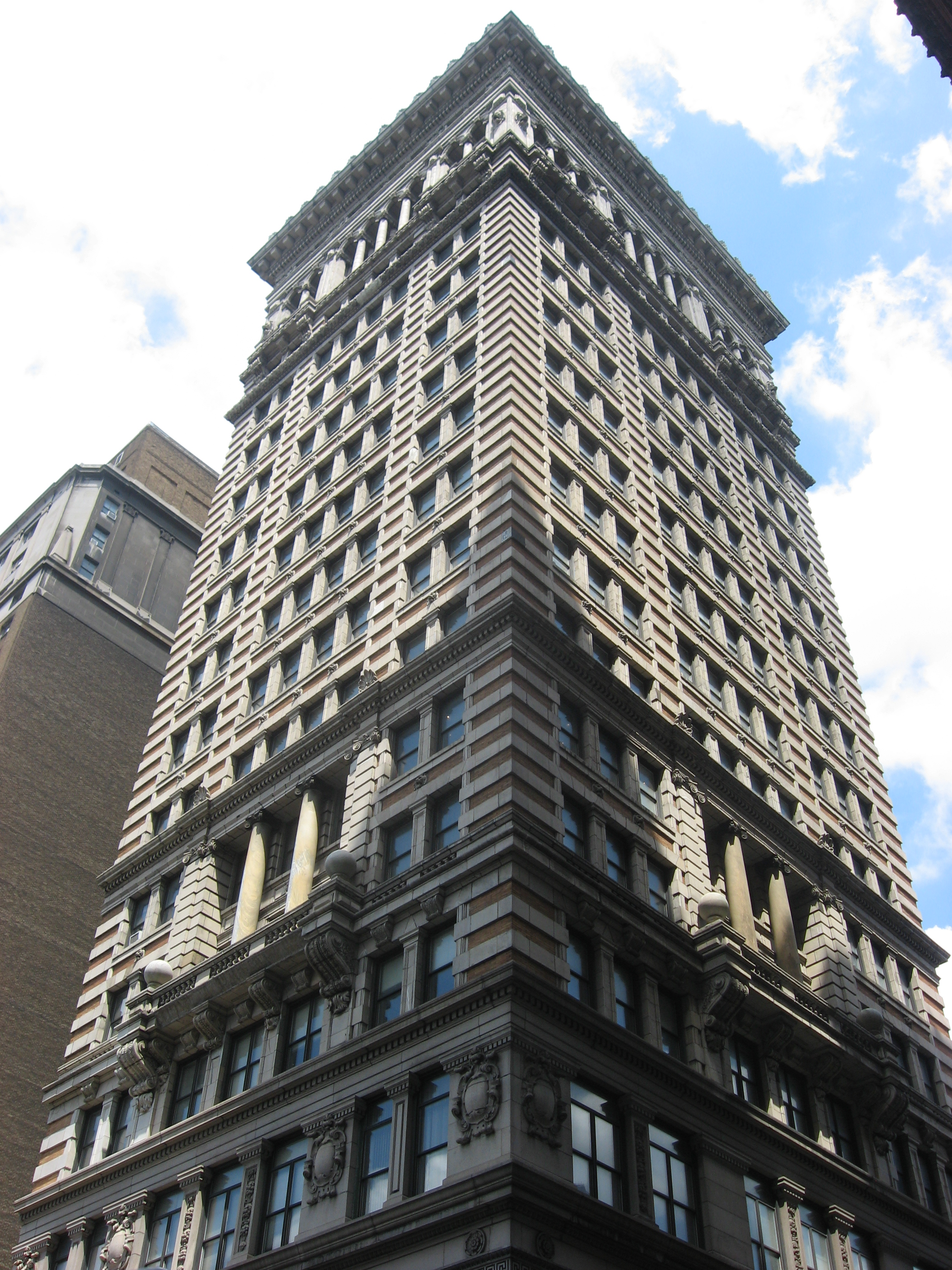
- The Arrott Building in the Fourth Avenue Historic District

- Location within Pennsylvania
- Location: 4th Ave. and Wood St., Downtown Pittsburgh, Pittsburgh, Pennsylvania, U.S.
- Coordinates: 40°26′22″N 80°0′2″W
- Architect: Multiple
- Architectural style: Late 19th and 20th Century Revivals, Late Victorian
- NRHP reference No.: 85001961

Significant dates
- Added to NRHP: September 5, 1985
- Designated PHLF: 1989

The Fourth Avenue Historic District is a historic district in downtown Pittsburgh, Pennsylvania, United States. The district was the center of finance and banks for the city during the decades surrounding the turn of the 20th century.

Many structures still exist from that era, including the location of the Pittsburgh Stock Exchange on the corner of Fourth Avenue and Smithfield Street from 1864 to 1903, the now vacant lot of its location at 229 Fourth Avenue from 1903 to 1962 and the still standing structure of the Exchange from 1962 until it closed in 1974. It is roughly bounded by Smithfield Street, Third Avenue, Market Square Place, and Fifth Avenue.

The period of significance for the District is from 1871, when the initial phase of the Dollar Bank building construction was finished, to 1934, 50 years before preparation of the nomination to the NRHP.

Some of its structures are:

- Dollar Bank, 340 4th Ave. (1871)
- Pittsburgh Stock Exchange, 333 4th Ave.
- Arrott Building, 401 4th Ave. (1902)
- Benedum-Trees Building, 223 4th Ave. (1905)
- The Carlyle, 306 4th Ave. (1906)
- Skinny Building, 241 Forbes Ave. (1926)
- Investment Building, 239 4th Ave. (1927)

The district was listed on the National Register of Historic Places on September 5, 1985. A boundary increase was added on March 20, 2013.

== Fourth Avenue ==
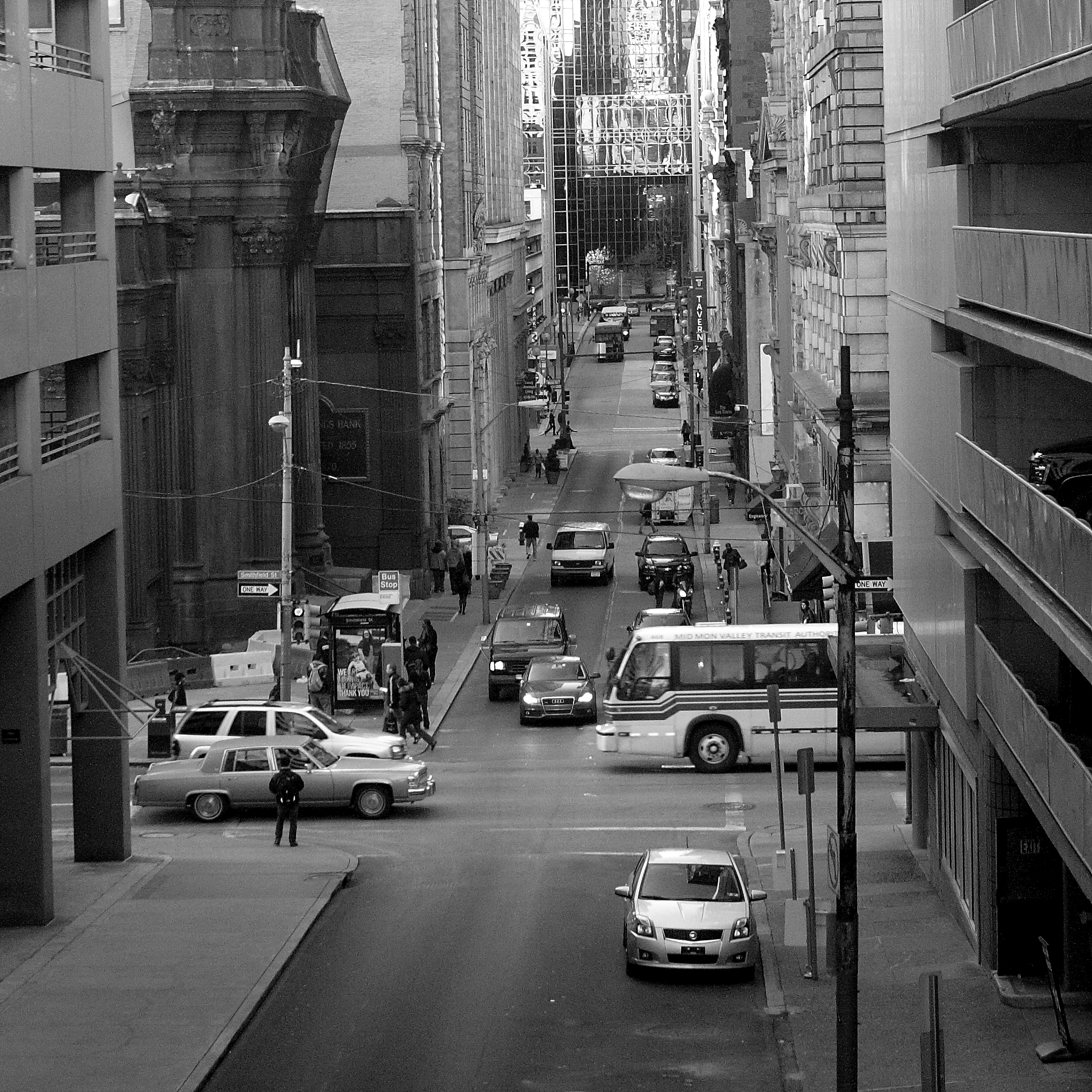
Fourth Avenue in 2011

Outside the historic district, Fourth Avenue contains a number of neoclassical and other buildings.

Notable buildings on Fourth Avenue include:

- Pittsburgh City County Building (1917)
- Allegheny County Office Building (1931)
- Grant Building (1932)
- River Vue (1957)
- Oxford Centre (1983)
- PPG Place (1983)
