= Skinny Building =

- Hendel Building
- U.S. Historic district – Contributing property
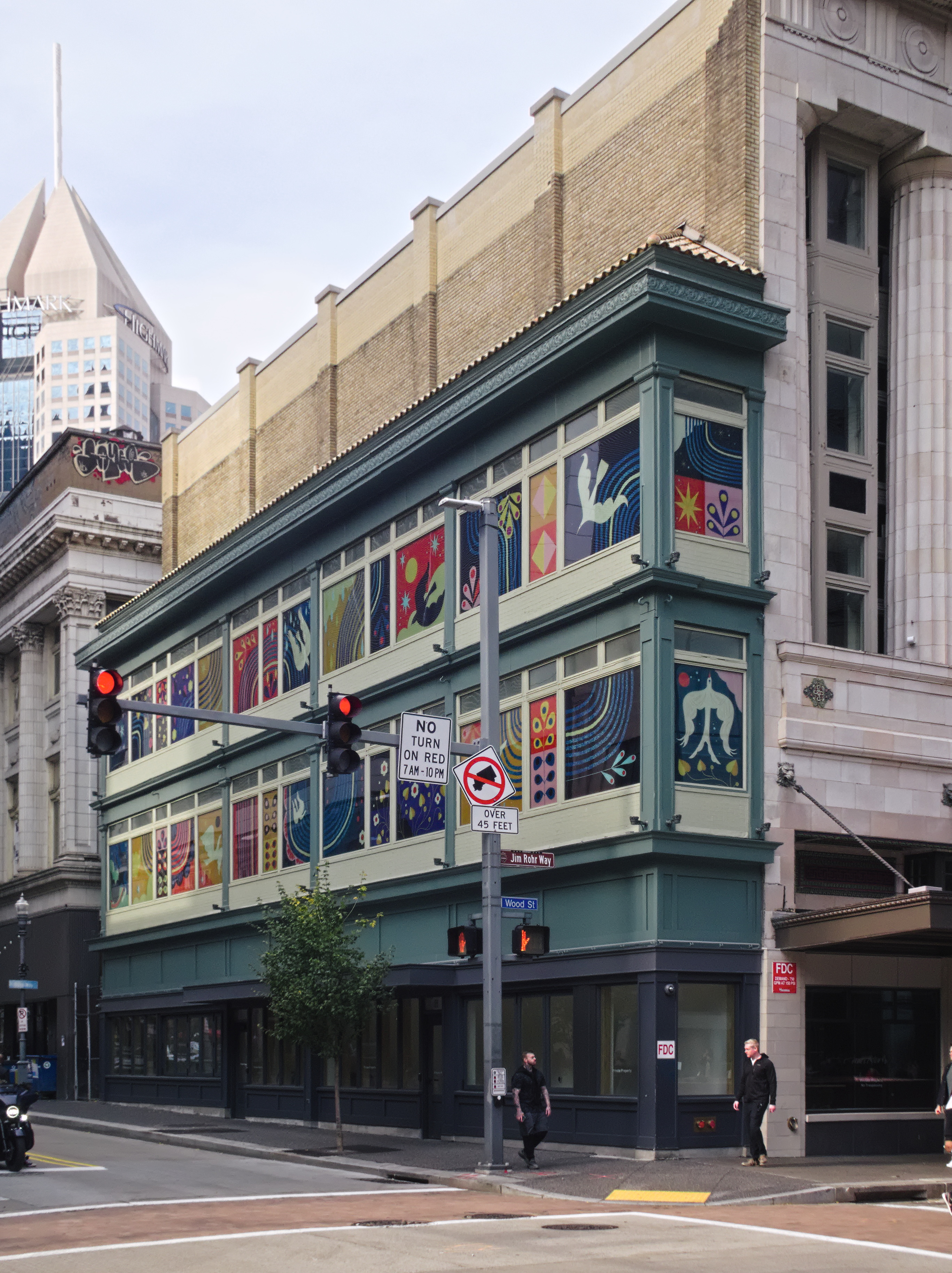
- The building in 2024

- Location within Pennsylvania Location within the United States
- Location: 241 Forbes Ave. Pittsburgh, Pennsylvania
- Coordinates: 40°26′25″N 80°00′04″W
- Built: 1926
- Part of: Fourth Avenue Historic District (Pittsburgh, Pennsylvania) (ID85001961)
- Designated CP: March 20, 2013

The Hendel Building, more commonly known as the Skinny Building, is a commercial building in Downtown Pittsburgh, Pennsylvania. At only 5 feet 2 inches (1.57 m) wide, it is one of the narrowest commercial buildings in the world, rivaling the Sam Kee Building in Vancouver which is considered the narrowest by Guinness World Records. The Kee building is 4 feet 11 inches (1.50 m) wide at the ground floor, but has overhanging bay windows on the second floor that extend to 6 feet (1.8 m). The Skinny Building's narrow lot was created in 1903 by a street widening project, and the building itself was constructed in 1926 by Louis Hendel (c. 1874–1945), partly out of spite for neighboring business owners who complained about him obstructing the sidewalk with his fruit-selling business. Due to the building's impractical dimensions, the second and third floors have not seen much use, but the ground floor has housed a number of different businesses including a popular lunch counter. It is listed on the National Register of Historic Places as a contributing property in the Fourth Avenue Historic District.

== History ==
=== Origins ===
The narrow lot on which the building stands originated in 1903, when Diamond Street (now Forbes Avenue) was widened in order to ease downtown traffic congestion. This required the demolition of several buildings on the north side of the street between Smithfield Street and Market Square, one of which was a two-story brick store owned by Hugh McKee. After the widening, only a 6-foot (1.8 m) by 80-foot (24 m) strip remained from McKee's formerly standard-sized lot. Other inconveniently sized parcels were consolidated into neighboring properties, but Greek-American entrepreneur D. J. Demas saw a business opportunity and secured a ten-year lease on McKee's lot. The Pittsburgh Gazette reported that "A frame building of 'shack' proportions is now being erected on the site. In this narrow stand will be a shoe shining emporium, an ice cream and soda dispensary, a peanut market, and a fruit stand."

In 1907, Andrew Mellon bought the property from McKee for $40,000. Mellon sold the building in 1918 to one of its tenants, fruit vendor Louis Hendel, who paid $95,000. At the time of the sale, The Gazette Times reported "The property has an obsolete improvement consisting of a one-story building. Mr. Hendel's place of business is in the rear, a cigar stand occupies the front, while a small restaurant is conducted in the intervening space." Hendel continued to run his business for the next eight years, but had frequent run-ins with authorities and neighboring business owners over sidewalk obstruction issues, as there was no room for customers inside the store. In 1926, a group called the Diamond Street Sidewalks Association was organized specifically to lobby against Hendel and other "sidewalk nuisances" along the street. Led by John Donahoe, who managed the Donahoe's food store next door to Hendel's business, the association ran advertisements targeting Hendel by name under the headline "Is this man higher than the law?"

=== Hendel Building ===
Despite the bad press, Hendel decided in 1926 to double down on his investment by building a new three-story building on the site. According to family members, he was motivated at least partly by spite for his hostile neighbors. After an initial refusal, Hendel managed to secure a building permit from the city and began construction on July 29. The Diamond Street Sidewalks Association lobbied against the "so called building", alleging permit violations, but were not able to stop the project. Hendel's first tenants, a cigar store and a restaurant, signed their leases in early December.

In 1928, the Lincoln Restaurant opened on the top two floors, catering to African-American customers who had few places to eat in the area. The Pittsburgh Courier reported that Hendel, a Jew, was sympathetic to the black community: "Mr. Hendel owns the building in which the restaurant is located. Through his friendship with [restaurant proprietor] Mr. Jefferson and the desire to help the colored race, he has leased this property, disregarding the bitter comments of the nearby white business men, in order that we might have a decent place to eat in the downtown section." Advertising "cozy booths for two" in the "world's narrowest building", the restaurant was said to have a row of narrow tables along one wall like a dining car, and "drew a patronage composed chiefly of the curious." Evidently it was not a successful venture as it was already out of business by 1931.

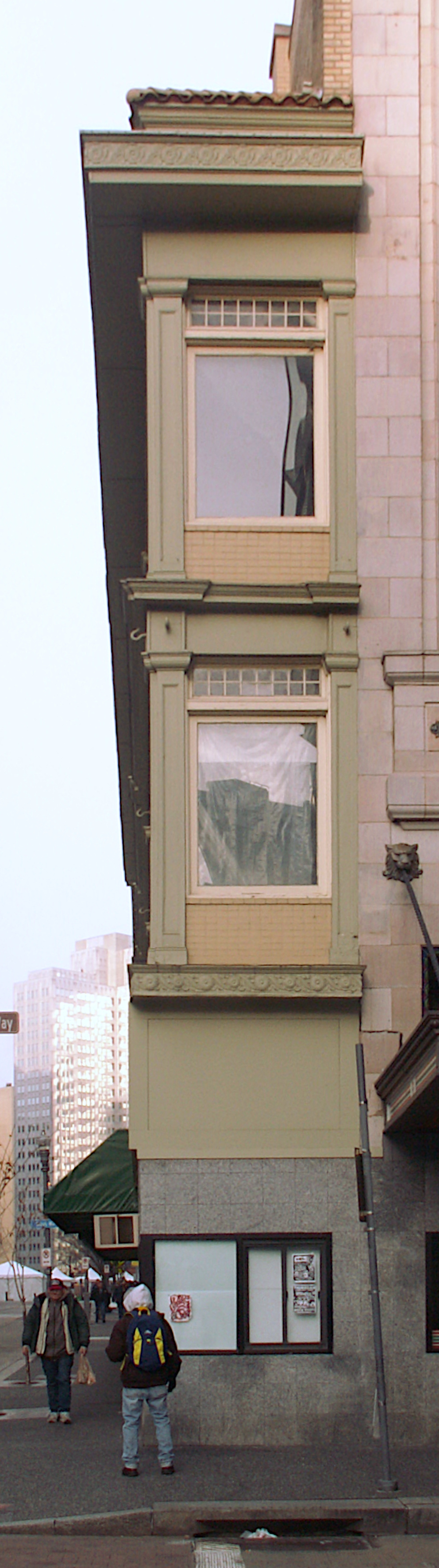
The building's Wood Street elevation as it appeared in 2015

While the upper levels of the building did not see much use, the ground floor housed a number of tenants over the years, including Hendel's original fruit store. Although it eventually outgrew the space, the company survived until the 1980s. (Hendel himself died in 1945 in Miami Beach.) Another successful tenant was a lunch counter called Raywell's, which operated from 1938 to 1979. Patrons of the restaurant sat on stools with their backs to the street, facing a narrow counter with about 18 inches (46 cm) of space behind for the employees—too narrow for the two waitresses to pass each other. A grill was installed in the corner. The building has housed various businesses since Raywell's closed and as of 2015 was occupied by a clothing store.

In 2000, the Hendel Building was proposed for demolition as part of the Market Place redevelopment project, though this ultimately did not come to fruition. However, the debate brought attention to the unusual building. In 2001, community activists turned the upstairs windows into an outward-facing art gallery displaying "images of, variously, graffiti art, vintage strippers and the late sportscaster Myron Cope". It was listed as a contributing property in the Fourth Avenue Historic District when the boundaries of the district were increased in 2013. That same year, the Pittsburgh Urban Redevelopment Authority (URA) bought the building, along with the neighboring Roberts Jewelers building, for $1.3 million. The Pittsburgh History and Landmarks Foundation used leftover money from a state grant to renovate the exteriors of both buildings in 2014.

In 2021, the URA approved the sale of the Skinny Building and Roberts Building to PNC for $1.3 million. As part of the sale, PNC agreed to preserve the exteriors of both buildings and work with preservationists to make sure any changes are historically sensitive. PNC planned to convert the Roberts Building to office space, while the upper floors of the Skinny Building would be used to display art. PNC completed a renovation of the building in 2024.

== Architecture ==
The Skinny Building is 80 feet (24 m) long and 5 feet 2 inches (1.57 m) wide. It is a three-story, steel-framed building with a brick, wood, and glass facade. The Forbes Avenue elevation is four bays wide with large, multi-pane windows. The windows vary in size, but each has a central casement flanked by large panes on either side, with three or five small multi-pane transom lights above. The short sides of the building, facing Wood Street and Book Way, are one bay wide and have single-pane windows with multi-pane transom lights. The top of the building has a projecting cornice and a hipped tile roof that slopes up toward the neighboring Roberts building. The upper floors are accessed by narrow, steep staircases; there is also reportedly a basement.

== See also ==
- Spite house
- Sam Kee Building
