= L. F. Kirchner =

American football player and physical instructor (1865–1951)

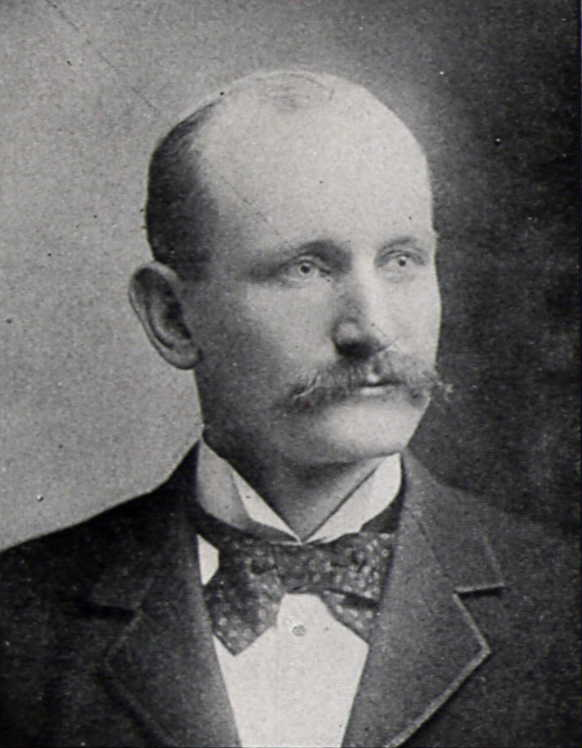
- Kirchner from 1904 Washington & Jefferson College yearbook

Profile
- Position: Center

Personal information
- Born: July 4, 1865; Philadelphia, Pennsylvania
- Died: June 11, 1951 (aged 85); East Washington, Pennsylvania

Career history
- 1890: "All-Pittsburghs"
- 1890: Allegheny Athletic Association
- 1890–1892: Pittsburgh Athletic Club

Professor Louis Frederick Kirchner (July 4, 1865 – June 11, 1951), misnamed in some posthumous sources as William Kirschner, was an early football player and physical instructor for the Pittsburgh Athletic Club. He may, or may not, have been one of the earliest professional football players. Even though he had never played football before 1890, he had the ability to learn and adapt to the game quickly. During the 1890s he was viewed as one of the best offensive linemen in Pennsylvania.

== Formation of the team ==
Kirchner came to the Pittsburgh Athletic Club (then called the East End Gymnastic Club) in 1889 as instructor of gymnastics and physical culture. The club at the time excelled at track and field and gymnastics. When the club formed its football team in 1890, Kirchner was one of its original members. A standout lineman, he became the team's bulwark. In October 1890, before the football team played its first game, Kirchner and Grant Dibert (who were both East End members) played on a pick-up team called the "All-Pittsburghs". Kirchner played center for the "All-Pittsburghs" so that he could square off against the Allegheny Athletic Association's John Moorhead Jr. While Allegheny proved too much for the "All-Pittsburghs", Kirchner and several other East End players gained experience for their games later in the season.

However rivalry aside, Kirchner played one game for Allegheny in 1890 during a 6–4 loss to the Cleveland Athletic Club. Allegheny manager O. D. Thompson was able to persuade Kirchner to play a guard position.

== Issues with professionalism ==
In 1891 the East Enders, behind Kirchner, rolled to a 7–0 record. However, the club was referred to as a semi-pro team.

Up until the 1892 season, hints professionalism in Pittsburgh football were centered around Kirchner. The Pittsburgh media had noted that the professor's salary went up in the autumn while the number of classes he taught went down. Some rival clubs, such as the Allegheny Athletic Association, felt that the professor's ability, his reduced class load, and his salary were connected. It was not uncommon to think that the increased salary and reduced workload were payment for playing on the team. Despite these concerns, the Amateur Athletic Union, the organization that policed amateur athletics, never investigated these claims. If they had, Kirchner may have had the honor of being the first professional football player, instead of Pudge Heffelfinger.

During a 6–6 tie between Pittsburgh and Allegheny in 1892, Pittsburgh accused the Allegheny players of purposely trying to injure Kirchner. Allegheny countered that the professor was a professional who didn't belong on the field anyway.

== Heffelfinger as a replacement? ==
In 1892, Pittsburgh manager John Barbour traveled to Cleveland, Ohio to watch a game involving the Chicago Athletic Association. Here Pittsburgh's manager scouted Pudge Heffelfinger and felt that he would be an ideal replacement for the injury-prone Kirchner. However Allegheny would nab him a few weeks later and use him against Pittsburgh.

== Later career ==
Kirchner obtained a degree in medicine in 1896 from the Western University of Pennsylvania (later renamed University of Pittsburgh). Later that year, he left his job as Pittsburgh Athletic Club's athletic instructor for a similar position at Washington & Jefferson College, where he also coached basketball and track teams. He was a professor of hygiene when he retired from W&J in 1941.
