= Dollar Bank =

Regional savings bank

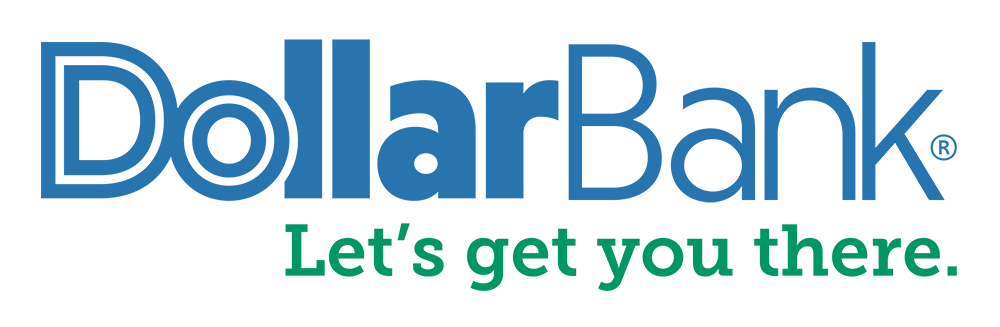
- Type: Mutual society
- Industry: Financial services
- Founded: 1855
- Headquarters: Pittsburgh, Pennsylvania
- Key people: James J. McQuade, President and CEO
- Total assets: ▲$12.5 billion (2026)
- Number of employees: 1,511
- Website: www.dollar.bank
- Dollar Savings Bank
- U.S. National Register of Historic Places
- U.S. Historic district – Contributing property
- Pittsburgh Landmark – PHLF
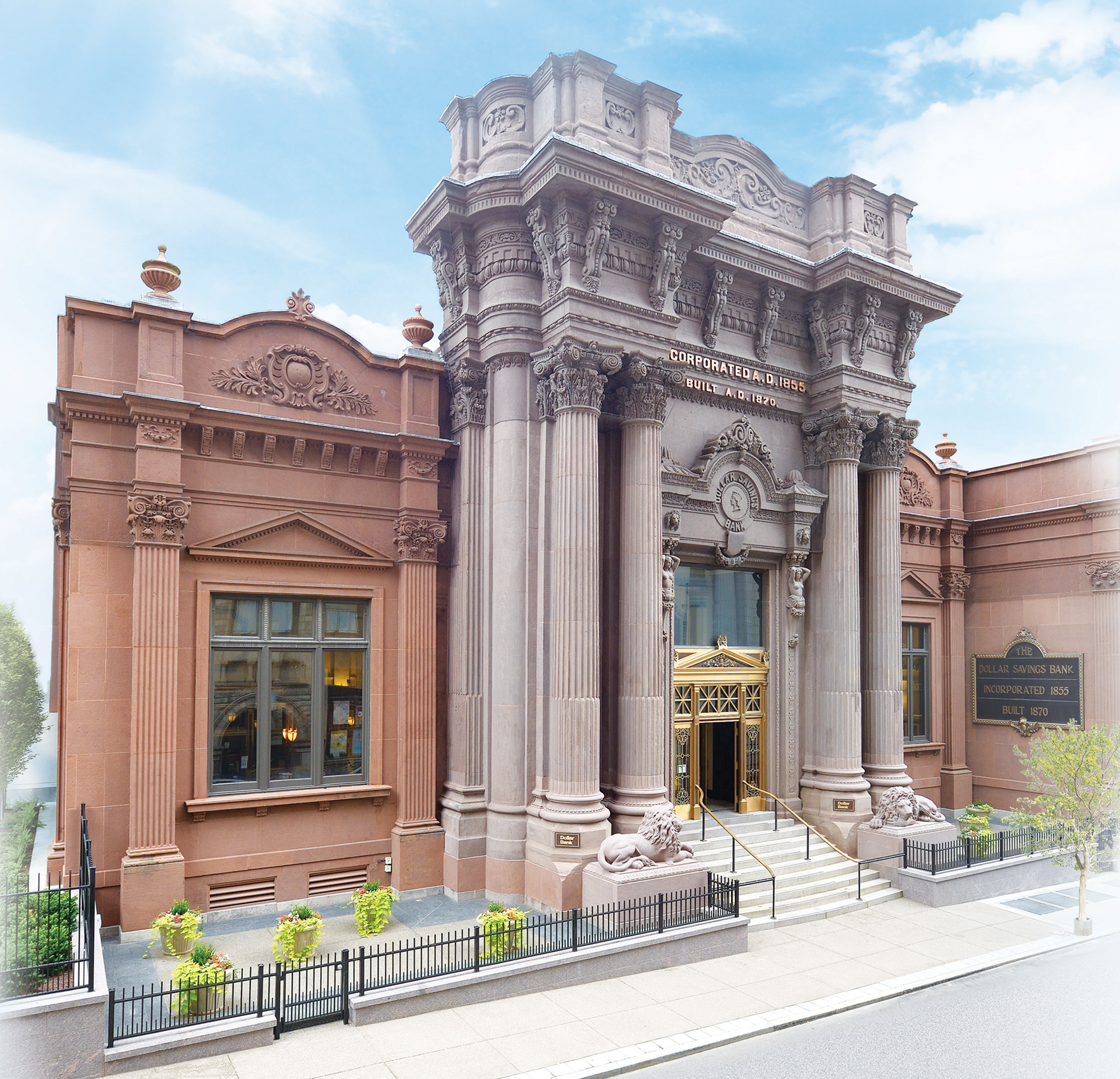
- Dollar Bank Fourth Avenue Building
- Location: Pittsburgh, Pennsylvania
- Area: 0.3 acres (0.12 ha)
- Architect: Isaac H. Hobbs & Sons
- Architectural style: Beaux Arts
- Part of: Fourth Avenue Historic District (ID85001961)
- NRHP reference No.: 76001594

Significant dates
- Added to NRHP: July 14, 1976
- Designated PHLF: 1970

Dollar Bank is a full-service regional savings bank serving both individuals and business customers, operating more than 90 offices throughout Pennsylvania, Ohio, Maryland, and Virginia. The bank's corporate headquarters is in downtown Pittsburgh alongside its Pennsylvanian regional headquarters. The Ohio headquarters is located in downtown Cleveland, and the Virginian headquarters is located in Hampton Roads.

== History ==
=== Founding ===
Charles A. Colton (1807–1881), a Hartford, Connecticut, native, moved to Pittsburgh with his family in 1850 to sell insurance. Mills, factories, coal mines, and other industries in the fast-growing Pittsburgh region drew thousands of people in search of work annually, Americans and immigrants alike. Colton recognized the need for a mutual bank to serve the interests of the working class.

On July 19, 1855, Dollar Bank opened for business as "The Pittsburgh Dollar Savings Institution". For $1, anyone could open a savings account. The first day's deposits totaled $53, which included two dollars from Charles Colton's 10-year-old son. Colton was the only salaried employee for the first three-and-a-half years of the institution's existence. In 1858, "The Pittsburgh Dollar Savings Institution". changed its name to Dollar Savings Bank.

A survey by The Daily Post in November 1880 revealed that the trade of ironworkers was the most common occupation among depositors who opened accounts that year. Artisans (stonemasons, plasterers, millwrights, and other skilled trades) were the second most common occupation, followed by porters, servers, clerks, salespeople, bookkeepers, farmers, and coal miners. Women comprised 45% of Dollar Bank's savings account holders.

At the time of Colton's death in 1881, Dollar Savings Bank had more depositors and more money on deposit ($6.5 million) than any of the other 17 banks in the city. Colton had personally handled the opening of more than 10,000 savings accounts of the 65,000+ accounts in total that Dollar Savings Bank had recorded in its ledgers over the first 26 years.

=== Mutual Bank Structure ===
Dollar Bank is one of the few U.S. banks that has a mutual structure: It is owned by its depositor base customers, not by outside shareholders. Mutual savings banks in the United States date back to 1816. Originally, these institutions were organized to help the working classes because most commercial bankers at the time primarily served retail and commercial business.

With no public shareholders to answer to, the bank is not fixated on stock price but on customer service. Such a structure lends itself to a more conservative business model so that the bank never participated, for instance, in the subprime lending that was so destructive to other banks during the 2008 financial crisis. Though rare in the banking industry, mutual structures are common in the insurance world and even in the investment world. The Vanguard Group of mutual funds is probably the most famous mutually-structured financial institution.

On December 3, 2018, the bank completed its reorganization from a mutual savings bank to a mutual holding company.

A mutual holding company results from the conversion of a mutual institution into a parent company of a subsidiary stock company. As a result of the conversion—referred to as mutual-to-stock conversion—the parent company owns a portion of the subsidiary stock company, and the subsidiary receives all of the assets and liabilities of the original mutual company. For owners of the original mutual company—members who, before the conversion, retained ownership and sometimes governance of the mutual—it means the termination of the prior-held mutual rights in exchange for the option to ownership in stock form.

As part of the conversion, the mutual holding company may undergo an initial public offering (IPO) where members of the original mutual company are allowed to purchase shares of the new mutual holding company, but Dollar Bank CEO Jim McQuade says that this is not Dollar's intention. From this point forward, Dollar Bank operates under a mutual holding company structure with Dollar Mutual Bancorp (a mutual entity without shareholders) owning 100% of the common stock of Dollar Bank, Federal Savings Bank.

=== African American Customers ===
Since Dollar Bank's founding in July 1855, there have been no restrictions on who can open a savings account. African Americans were among its earliest customers.

First Savings Account

Born in Richmond, Virginia, in 1812, Alfred A. Gibson became Dollar Bank's first African American depositor when he opened his savings account on November 13, 1855. He listed his occupation as a porter on a boat. In 1860, Gibson opened a second savings account at Dollar Bank. By that time, he was a porter at the Monongahela House, one of the most celebrated hotels in Pittsburgh. He was one of thirty founding members of the Colored United Brethren of Mutual Relief, a mutual aid society founded in 1843 in the Hill District. His wife, Maria Gibson, and son, Alfred A. Gibson Jr., also had savings accounts with Dollar Bank.

First Mortgage

Dollar Bank's first mortgage to an African American was issued in February 1860 to John L. Woodson, a barber and oldest son of Lewis and Caroline Woodson. John L. Woodson paid off his $850 mortgage in 1863. He and his wife, Julia Brannon Woodson, raised their three children in their home on Pittsburgh's South Side.

Civil War Growth

Nearly 200,000 African American men fought in the Civil War. Soldiers such as Clayton Ragan, Vachel Catlin, William Temple, and William Chatman became early customers of Dollar Bank.

Enslaved people in the battle-torn Virginia region took liberation into their own hands by fleeing toward the lines of Union troops and Northern states. The migration swelled the African American population in cities like Pittsburgh, which was already growing with industrial expansion and workers seeking jobs. Between 1855 and the early 1900s, about 40% of Dollar Bank's African American customers were born in Virginia.

=== Famous Notable Customers ===
Founders of iconic Pittsburgh department stores were among Dollar Bank's depositors in the late 1800s. Joseph Horne opened a savings account in 1862 in trust for his son, Durbin. Brothers Morris and Jacob Kaufmann, German immigrants who were making a name in Pittsburgh retail, became depositors in 1888 and 1890, respectively. Walter Rosenbaum, whose father Max founded The Rosenbaum Company store, which for decades anchored a corner of the intersection at Market Street and Liberty Avenue, opened an account with Dollar Bank in 1894.

Artist George Hetzel, founder of the Scalp Level School of Painting, is famous for his landscapes showcasing the natural beauty of Southwestern Pennsylvania. In February 1866, he opened a savings account at Dollar Bank. Author, publisher, abolitionist, and women's rights advocate Jane Swisshelm opened a savings account at Dollar Bank in 1876. The Pittsburgh neighborhood of Swisshelm Park is named in her honor. In March 1888, John Paul Golden, M.D., became the first African American graduate with a medical degree from Western Pennsylvania Medical College, forerunner of University of Pittsburgh School of Medicine. One month later, Dr. Golden became a Dollar Bank depositor.

Composer and conductor Victor Herbert made his home in Pittsburgh for six years, from 1898 through 1904 when he was conductor of the Pittsburgh Symphony. His house in Shadyside became a gathering place for world-famous musical talent. Herbert opened a savings account at Dollar Bank in 1900.

Abolitionist, preacher, and Underground Railroad activist Lewis Woodson and his wife Caroline Woodson became Dollar Bank depositors in 1857 and 1860. They were the patriarch and matriarch of one of the notable African American families in early Pittsburgh. By the early 1900s, at least twelve Woodson family members had opened savings accounts at Dollar Bank.

=== First Office ===
The Dollar Savings Bank's Fourth Avenue Building was opened in April 1871 and is still in operation today. The architect was Isaac H. Hobbs & Sons of Philadelphia. The building was constructed using 14,000 tons of brownstone quarried in Portland, Connecticut.

When the Hobbs building was constructed, two stone lions were carved on site beside the stairs leading to the entrance of the Fourth Avenue Building as symbols of guardianship of the people's money. The stately lions guarding the entrance were sculpted by 28-year-old German immigrant Max Kohler, and his 25-year-old assistant, Welsh immigrant Richard C. Morgan. Each lion was carved from a single block of quarry-bedded brownstone. A project to restore the original Kohler lions began in September 2009. A new pair of lions, exact replicas of the originals, were created by Master Carver Nicholas Fairplay and his assistant, Brian C.E. Baker. The original lions were returned to the Fourth Avenue building in February 2012 and placed inside the main banking hall, while the new lions were installed on the plinths outside in May 2013.

The Board Room was added to The Dollar Savings Bank's Fourth Avenue Building in 1896 for $37,981.

Today, the Dollar Bank Heritage Center in the Fourth Avenue Building contains displays of vintage banking machines, Dollar Bank advertising through the decades, oil portraits and photographs of the Bank's officers and Trustees, and hand-written ledgers featuring the original signatures of some of the Dollar Bank's early depositors.

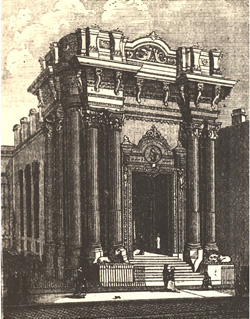
Fourth Avenue Building Sketch

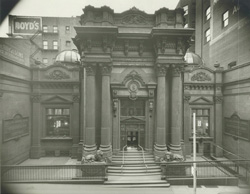
Fourth Avenue Building - Exterior

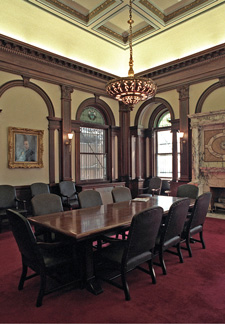
Fourth Avenue Building - Board Room

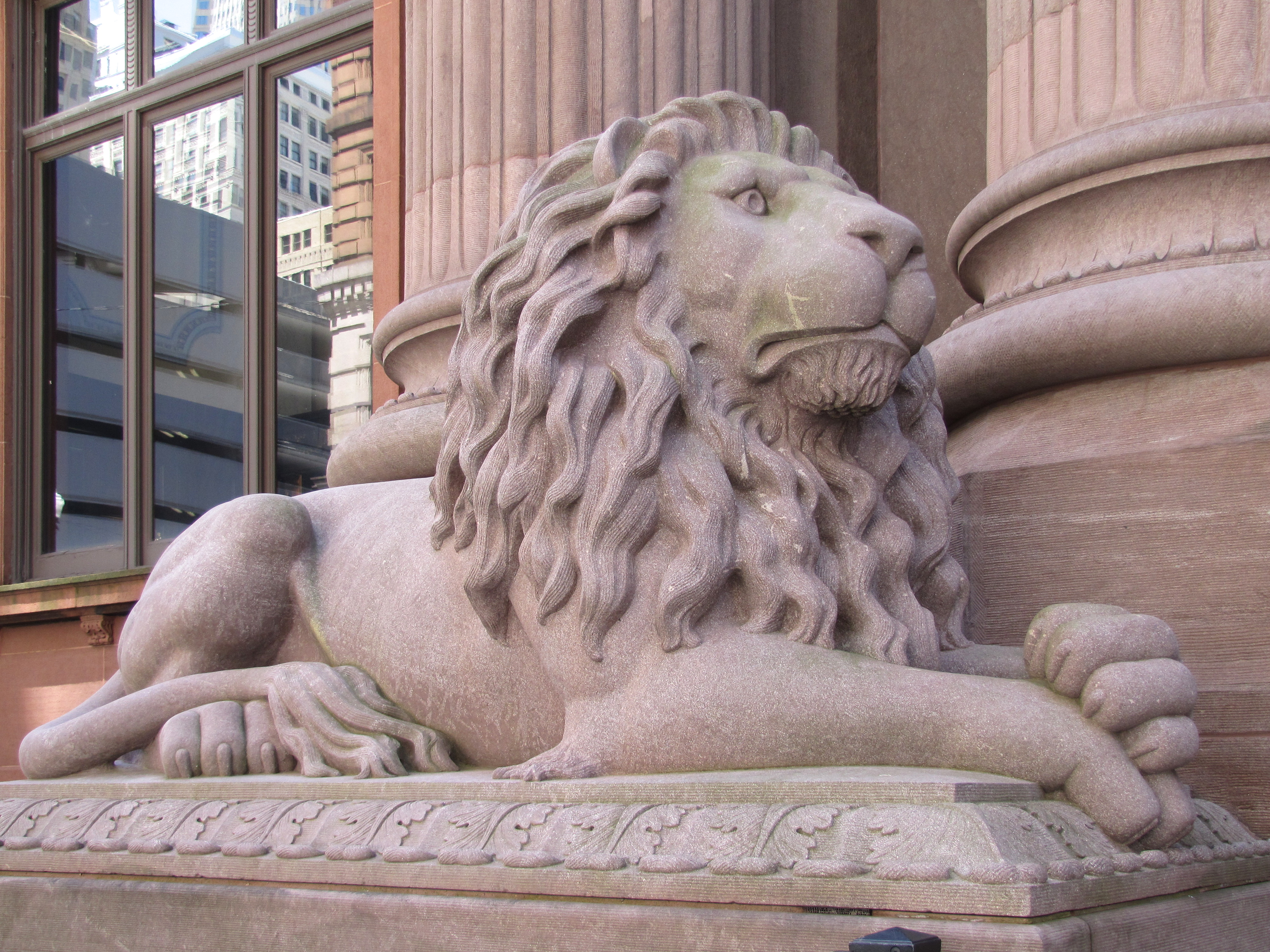
Lion to the left of the entrance

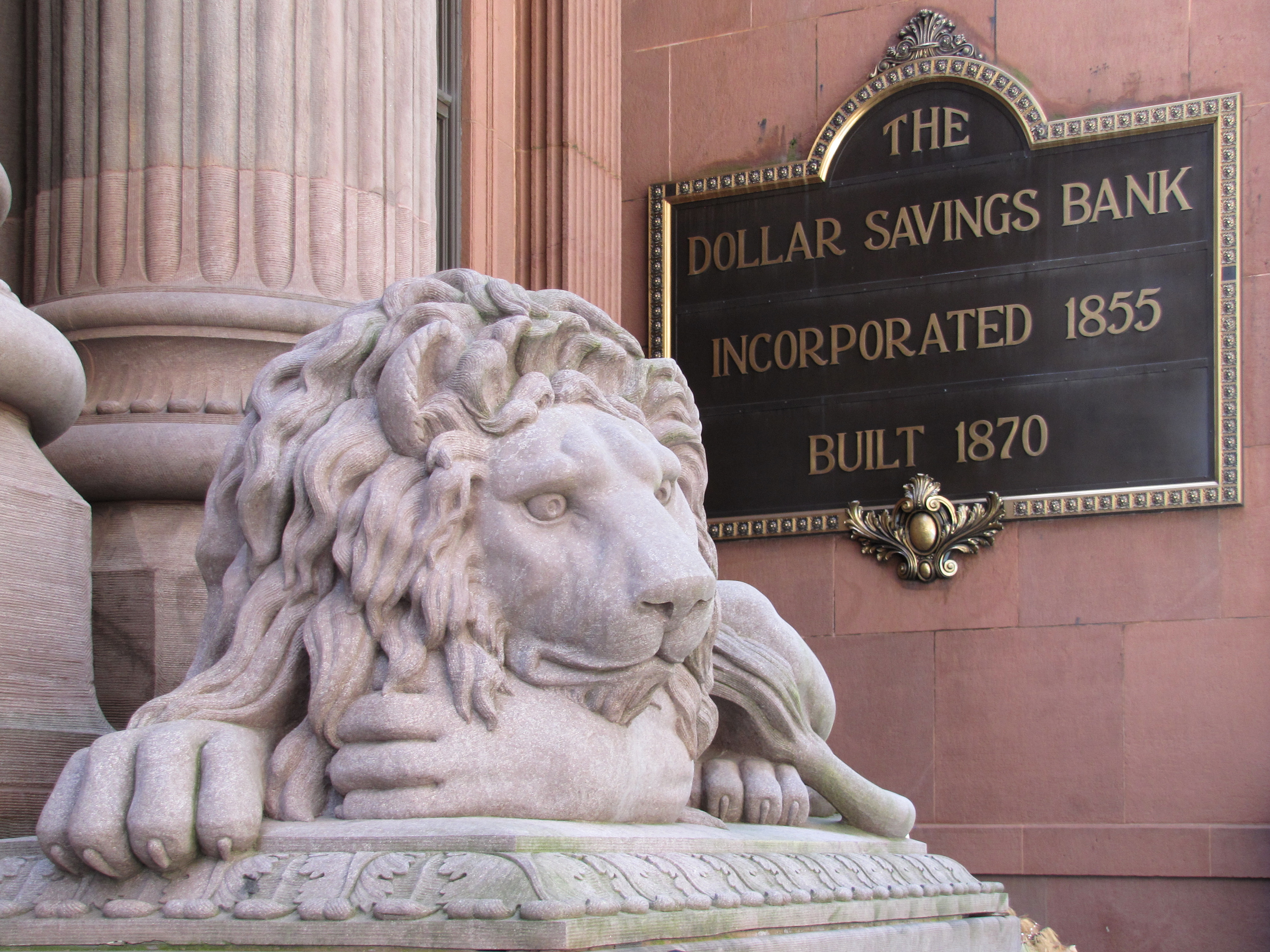
Lion to the right of the entrance

=== The Great Depression ===
During the 1930s, the main lobby was redecorated. Lighting fixtures were replaced with a new brass chandelier and sconces, which remain in place today. The extensive security cage over the teller counter was reduced by removing a substantial portion of the wrought iron. Pittsburgh was not immune to the bank failures that plagued the nation during the Great Depression. Pittsburgh-based financial institutions that closed in 1931 and 1932 included Exchange National Bank, Monongahela National Bank, Diamond National Bank, and Duquesne National Bank. Perhaps the most shocking failure was that of the Bank of Pittsburgh, N.A., which closed its doors in September 1931. Dollar Savings Bank, however, grew deposits from $44 million in 1930 to $56 million in 1940.

After the St. Patrick's Day Flood of 1936, Dollar Savings Bank hired local contractor W.F. Trimble & Sons to install a new vault that was both fireproof and flood-proof. Designed by Philadelphia-based vault engineers The Hollar Company, the vault was installed in November 1937.

World War II and 1950s

Dollar Savings Bank applied for FDIC membership in November 1943.

By June 1950, Dollar Savings Bank had more than 63,000 depositors and assets of $101.6 million, the first time in the bank's history that assets exceeded $100 million.

Dollar Savings Bank celebrated its 100th anniversary in July 1955.

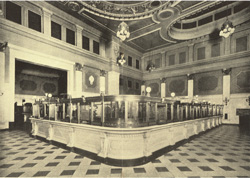
Fourth Avenue Building - Main Lobby

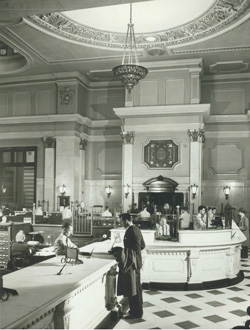
Fourth Avenue Building - Main Lobby

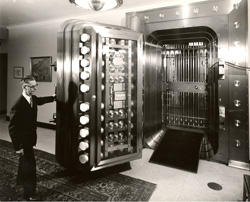
Fourth Avenue Office Vault

=== Expansion ===
Dollar Savings Bank bought the six-story Boyd Building at 303-309 Smithfield Street in February 1950. The bank built a new, additional entrance on Smithfield and used the second floor for offices. The rest of the building was leased to the Pittsburgh chapter of the American Red Cross.

In 1956, Dollar Savings Bank purchased the DeRoy Building and converted the first floor for bank use, expanding the Fourth Avenue Building footprint. This building was demolished in 1970, and the space became a pedestrian plaza.

In the 1960s, the Fourth Avenue Building's cupola skylights were filled in, the interior was repainted, and the teller counter was altered to make it a one-level surface.

Dollar Savings Bank opened its first branch office in the Oliver Building on June 29, 1961. The Squirrel Hill branch office opened in 1963; it was Dollar Bank's first location outside of downtown. Over the next 15 years, Dollar Bank expanded to 21 locations in four counties.

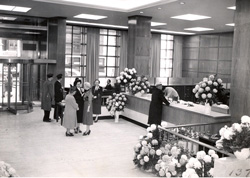
Smithfield Expansion - Boyd Building

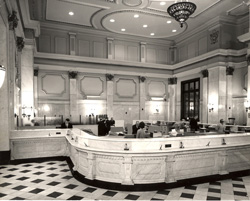
Fourth Avenue Building - Main Lobby Redecorated

=== Early technology ===
The rapid expansion of branch banking was made possible by Dollar Savings Bank's installation of the NCR 315, a real-time online teller accounting system, in November 1964. Capable of processing 12,000 savings transactions an hour, the NCR 315 transmitted data in real-time over leased phone lines. Dollar Savings Bank customers could complete any normal transaction at any window, in any Dollar Savings Bank office, instead of being tied to a particular location for their bank business. Dollar Savings Bank was the first bank in Pennsylvania and among the first ten in the nation to use an online teller accounting system.

On April 1, 1975, Dollar Savings Bank launched Pay-By-Phone, a fully automated bill payment service for savings account customers. The system was the first in Pennsylvania and the second in the United States.

Dollar Savings Bank's Fourth Avenue Office was listed on the National Register of Historic Places on July 14, 1976.

In December 1976, Dollar Savings Bank announced that its assets had reached $1 billion, representing a 17.9 percent growth over just one year before. This was the largest single year of growth in the history of the bank. The bank's net earnings increased more than 200 percent in the previous fiscal year.

Dollar Savings Bank installed its first automated teller machine (ATM) in 1977 and in 1978, free retail checking accounts, called "NOW accounts", were offered for the first time. In July 1981, Dollar Savings Bank began to provide accounts and services tailored to the needs of businesses.

=== Market expansion ===
On September 20, 1984, The Dollar Savings Bank acquired Continental Federal Savings and Loan Bank and offered banking services to the Cleveland, Ohio, area. In a deal brokered by the Federal Savings and Loan Insurance Corporation, The Dollar Savings Bank acquired the troubled Cleveland-based thrift, and within two years, a combination of government guarantees against losses and new investment returned Continental to profitability. That same year, Continental's name was changed to Dollar Bank, and The Dollar Savings Bank was renamed to "Dollar Bank". Dollar Bank began offering term loans, lines of credit and Credit cards in 1986.

The first Dollar Bank Loan Center was opened in Murrysville, Pennsylvania, on January 18, 1994. Dollar Bank's "Win-Win Home Equity Adjustable Rate Loan" was launched as the first loan of its kind in March 1994. Dollar Bank became the 16th bank in the country to offer online banking via the Internet in March 1997. Dollar Bank initiated the Freedom ATM Alliance surcharge-free network, a group of 29 banks that joined on January 4, 1999. The goal of the Alliance is to provide surcharge-free ATM alternatives to customers. Banks entering the Alliance agree not to surcharge the customers of any other Alliance member at their ATMs.

On June 28, 2016, Dollar Bank announced that they had agreed to merge with Virginia-based Bank @lantec. Both institutions are mutual banks. Dollar Bank retained all Bank @lantec employees and continued to operate all four Virginia bank offices. Dollar Bank's asset size grew to over $7.5 billion.

On October 5, 2016, Dollar Bank announced that it had agreed to merge with Pennsylvania-based Progressive-Home Federal Savings and Loan. Both institutions are mutual banks. Dollar Bank retained all Progressive-Home Federal Savings and Loan employees and continues to operate the two branch offices in Allentown and Dormont. Following the merger, Dollar Bank's asset size grew to over $7.6 billion.

On July 20, 2020, Dollar Bank announced that it became the official retail bank of the Cleveland Guardians.

In 2021, Dollar Bank announced that it had agreed to merge with Standard Bank.

=== National recognition ===
On April 6, 1998, the Dollar Bank online banking service was inducted into the 1998 Computerworld Smithsonian Innovation Collection.

=== Product development ===
In January 2005, the Dollar Bank CD Ladder was launched as the first CD of its kind. Laddering is based upon the premise of not putting all money in a single CD. By dividing money between CD terms ranging from short to long, CDs with a range of yields that reflect market expectations for the future direction of interest rates are purchased.

Dollar Bank was the first to offer text messaging on June 19, 2007, and mobile online banking was introduced on June 5, 2008.

On March 11, 2009, Dollar Bank introduced reverse mortgages to provide financial help to seniors.

=== Recent developments ===
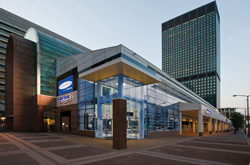

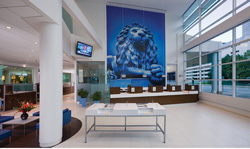

In July 2012, Dollar Bank was the first financial institution in the region to release video personal teller machines. These machines allow customers to speak to a live teller during non-traditional banking hours.

On November 1, 2015, James J. McQuade was appointed as the bank's new president. Mr. Oeler remained the CEO until his retirement on May 31, 2016, when Mr. McQuade became president and CEO. Mr. McQuade has 27 years of banking experience, 20 with Dollar Bank. He previously served as the bank's Executive Vice President of Retail Banking.

== Operations ==
During the first half of the 2026 fiscal year, Dollar Mutual Bancorp’s financial statement reflects its continued strength and growth. Its core capital amounted to over $1.39 billion or 11.12% of its total average assets.

=== Business banking ===
Dollar Bank provides financial tools and personal services to small businesses, large companies, and corporations. The bank offers a variety of traditional loans, commercial and investment real estate loans, lines of credit, and credit cards. Its Business Express Loan offers a simple online application and instant decision. Dollar Bank's deposit accounts, cash management, and online services help businesses manage cash flow more efficiently, control, and confidently.

=== Subsidiaries ===
Dollar Bank has several subsidiary businesses, including:

- Dollar Bank Servicing Center services loans and mortgages
- Dollar Bank Insurance Agency, Inc., provides term life insurance products

== Notable buildings ==
=== Pittsburgh ===
Dollar Bank's official headquarters is currently at 20 Stanwix Street in Downtown Pittsburgh. Its old headquarters building at 340 Fourth Avenue in Pittsburgh is listed on the National Register of Historic Places.
