= Arrott Building =

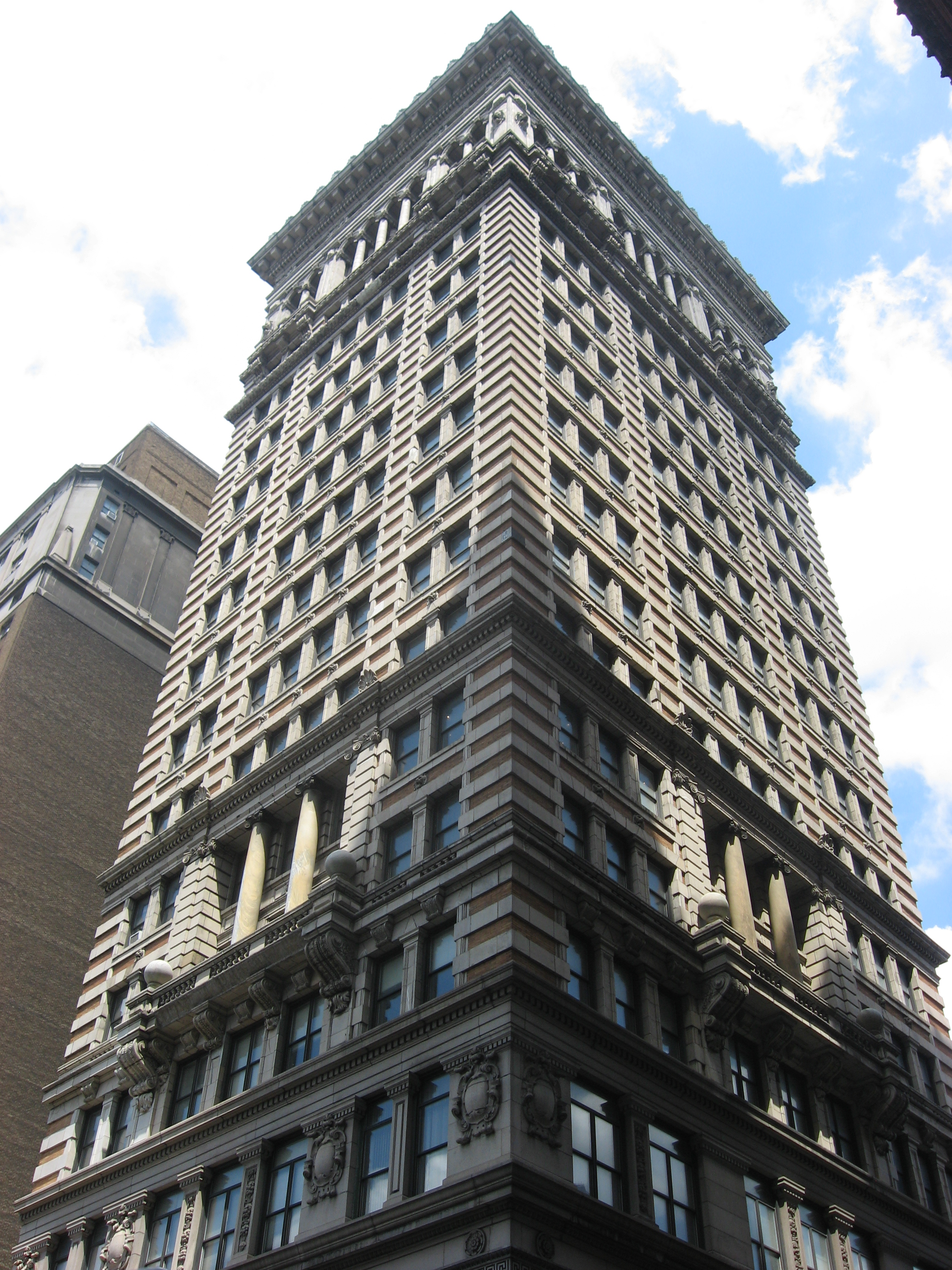

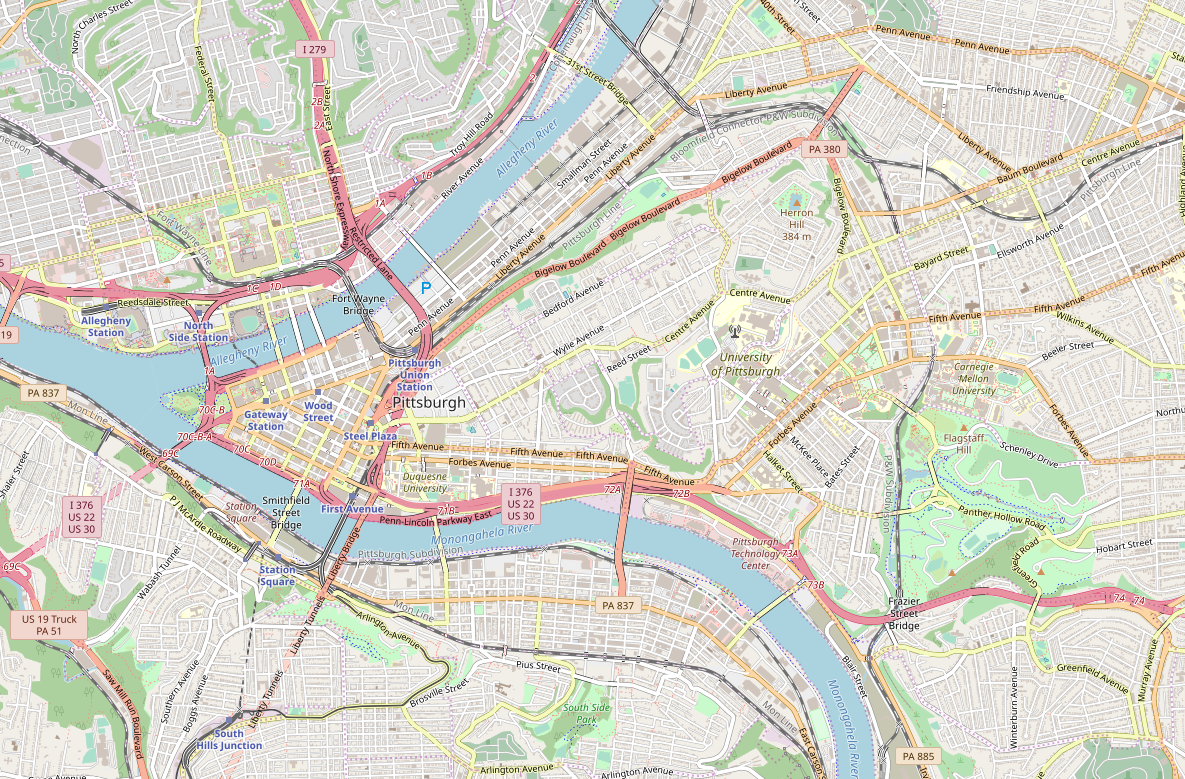
- Location of Arrott Building in Downtown Pittsburgh
- 40°26′22.34″N 80°0′4.68″W
- Location: 405 Wood Street (Downtown), Pittsburgh, Pennsylvania, USA

History
- Built: 1902

Site notes
- Architect: Frederick J. Osterling

U.S. Historic district – Contributing property
- Designated: September 5, 1985
- Part of: Fourth Avenue Historic District

Pittsburgh Landmark – PHLF
- Designated: 2000

The Arrott Building is a skyscraper which is located at Fourth Avenue and Wood Street in downtown Pittsburgh, Pennsylvania.

It was added to the list of Pittsburgh History and Landmarks Foundation Historic Landmarks in 2000.

== History and architectural features ==
Built in 1902, the Arrott Building was designed by Frederick J. Osterling. The building and several surrounding financial buildings are part of the Fourth Avenue Historic District, which is listed on the National Register of Historic Places. The Arrott Building was added to the list of Pittsburgh History and Landmarks Foundation Historic Landmarks in 2000.

The building opened in May 2021 as The Industrialist Hotel, part of the Autograph Collection by Marriott.
