= John Baxter Barbour Jr. =

American businessman and sports executive (1862–1929)

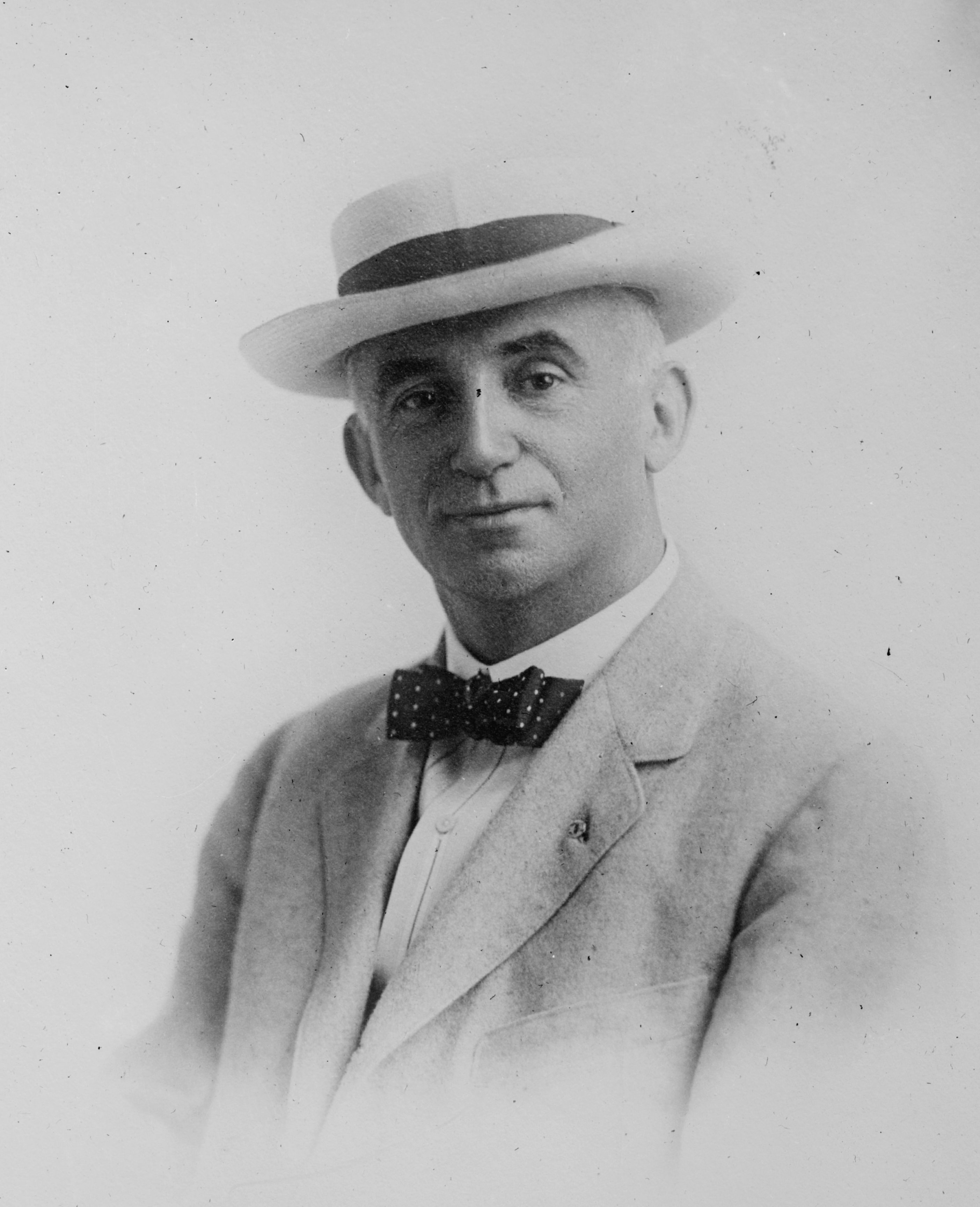
- Born: April 16, 1862; Pittsburgh, Pennsylvania
- Died: March 11, 1929 (aged 66); Pittsburgh, Pennsylvania
- Occupation: Businessman
- Known for: Organizer and charter member of Pittsburgh Stock Exchange
- Spouse: Laura B. Rogers (m. 1887)

Signature
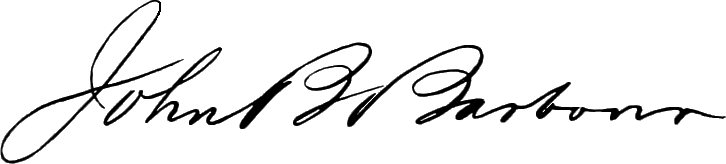

John Baxter Barbour Jr. (April 16, 1862 – March 11, 1929) was President of the Federal League in baseball in 1914 and president of the Pittsburgh Stock Exchange for eight terms. At the time of his death, he was a member of the John B. Barbour Investment and Security Company.

== Early life and education ==
He was born on April 16, 1862, to John Baxter Barbour Sr. and Isabella F. McKelvy in Pittsburgh.

He acquired his education in the public schools of his native city, and was graduated from its high school in 1880. He supplemented this training with a comprehensive course in stenography.

== Business career ==
=== Stocks and exchanges ===
After learning stenography, in the spring of 1881 he became bookkeeper for Thomas J. Watson, at that time the leading oil broker in Pittsburgh. While the speculative craze in oil was at its height during 1882 and after this time, Barbour was at the head of the office affairs for Watson, and it is due to his clear- headed judgment that important enterprises were carried to a successful issue. Subsequently, he formed a connection with another broker, James S. McKelvy, with whom he remained until January i, 1890. He then became the local exchange representative of Rea Brothers & Company, stock and grain brokers, and upon their retirement in 1892 Barbour succeeded to their business. The business was a general one in stocks, bonds and grain, and Barbour made a specialty of local and investment securities.

=== Oil Exchange ===
So pronounced and widely recognized was the business and executive ability of Barbour, that he was honored with election to membership in the old Oil Exchange when he was but nineteen years of age. and he is now one of the oldest members of the Pittsburgh Stock Exchange, of which he was one of the organizers and a charter member. He was its first secretary and treasurer, and served one term as vice-president. Later Barbour served five successive terms as treasurer, and after that served three terms as vice-president and then became president in 191 1, and later declined reelection on account of ill health. He was for several years director and chairman of the two most important of its committees, namely, on securities and law and offenses, and on May 3, 1916, was again elected president. As a representative of James S. McKelvy at the time of the great Penn Bank Syndicate in 1883-84, Barbour was a member of the New York Petroleum Exchange. As treasurer of the Pittsburgh Petroleum, Stock and Metal Exchange he served two terms.

At the time of his death, he was a member of the John B. Barbour Investment and Security Company.

== Political career ==
Until the James G. Blaine campaign of 1884 Barbour was a staunch supporter of Democratic principles. At that time, however, he became convinced that the country was in better hands when the Republican party held the reins, and he transferred his allegiance, in which he has never wavered, to that party. He has served as delegate to a number of conventions.

== Clubs and social affiliations ==
He was a founder of the Federal League of Baseball Clubs.

He has been a school director of the new Eleventh Ward for several years, and also served as treasurer of the board. He is also president of the Republican Association of his district and a school visitor, and is the treasurer of the City Republican Executive Committee. He and his wife are members of the East Liberty Presbyterian Church. His fraternal affiliations are numerous, among them being: Dallas Lodge, No. 508, Free and Accepted Masons; Shiloh Chapter, No. 257, Royal Arch Masons; Tancred Commandery, No. 48, Knights Templar; Syria Temple, Ancient Arabic Order Nobles of the Mystic Shrine; East End Council, No. 275, Royal Arcanum. He is past archon in the Improved Order of Heptasophs, and was a deputy supreme archon. His club membership is in the Duquesne, Pittsburgh Athletic Association, Stanton Heights Golf Club and Americus Republican clubs. In the latter he has held offices since 1887, was a trustee from 1889 to 1895, and served in the office of vice-president, 1895-96-97, and in January, 1916, was elected major of the Americus Battalion, and member of the board of trustees. He was a charter member of the Pittsburgh Athletic Club, which he was largely instrumental in organizing in 1883, and has served three times as president and was manager of the baseball and football teams. He was also one of the original directors of the Pittsburgh Athletic Association, and resigned owing to failing health.

== Personal life and death ==
Barbour married Laura B. Rogers (daughter of James E. and Sarah (Marshall) Rogers), on December 22, 1887. They had children: Isabella McKelvy, and Marshall Rogers.

He was a prominent Mason. He died on March 11, 1929, at his home in Pittsburgh, at the age of 67.
