= Grant Dibert =

American football player (1867–1948)

Profile
- Position: Fullback

Personal information
- Born: September 22, 1867
- Died: August 24, 1948 (aged 80)

Career information
- College: Swarthmore College

Career history
- Pittsburgh Athletic Club (1890–1893); "All-Pittsburgh" (1890); Allegheny Athletic Association (1891)

Awards and highlights
- First professional player under contract

Grant Dibert (September 22, 1867 – August 24, 1948) was an early professional football player with the Pittsburgh Athletic Club and the Allegheny Athletic Association. As a fullback, his primary team was the Pittsburgh Athletic Club, whom he played for from the team's founding in 1890 until 1893. Prior to his professional career, Dibert played college football at Swarthmore College.

In October 1890, when the Pittsburgh Athletic Club (then known as the East End Gymnastic Club) formed its football team, Dibert was named the team's fullback. Later in the month, before the club played any games, Dibert and several other of the club's members played for the "All-Pittsburghs", an informal collection of local players, in a pick-up game against Allegheny Athletic Association. The following season, he remained with the Pittsburgh Athletic Club but also played at least one game with the Allegheny Athletic Association. In a game between the Athletic Association and the Cleveland Athletic Club, Dibert's punting skills were credited with keeping Cleveland deep within their own territory and added an important field goal in 6–6 tie between the clubs.

Dibert made his historical mark on professional football off the field. In 1893, he became the first football player to sign and be kept under to the first known professional football contract with the Pittsburgh Athletic Club. The contract covered all of the Pittsburgh Athletic Club games for the 1893 season, and paid Dibert $50 per game. While the signature on that piece of paper is barely recognizable, most sports historians believe that the player who signed the contract was probably Dibert. Still remaining on the paper are the remnants of two letters from the signature, a high loop that could be the top of a "b" and, after a short space, the crossed top of a "t". A copy of the contract is on display at the Pro Football Hall of Fame, in Canton, Ohio.

Dibert opened the 1893 season in the Pittsburgh backfield, but lost his position after the fourth game of the season. Although he was mentioned later in the season as an available sub, he did not play for the team again. It is unknown if Dibert was paid for only the games he played in or if he was given money, just to prevent him from playing for Allegheny.

== Notes ==
"I hereby agree to participate in all regularly scheduled football games of the Pittsburg [commonly spelled without the "h" at the time] Athletic Club for the full season of 1893. As an active player I agree to accept a salary of $50 per contest and also acknowledge that I will play for no other club during PAC games."

— Grant Dibert's 1893 contract with Pittsburgh Athletic Club, the first known professional football contract
