= 1892 Hampden–Sydney Tigers football team =

American college football season

1892 Hampden–Sydney Tigers football
- Conference: Independent
- Record: 0–1
- Head coach: William Ford Bull (1st season)

1892 Southern college football independents records
	Conf.			Overall
Team	W	L	T	W		L		T
Centre		–		6	–	0	–	0
Biddle		–		1	–	0	–	0
Furman		–		1	–	0	–	0
North Carolina A&M		–		1	–	0	–	0
Virginia Military		–		4	–	0	–	1
Wake Forest		–		4	–	0	–	1
Johns Hopkins		–		7	–	1	–	0
North Carolina		–		5	–	1	–	0
Central (KY)		–		4	–	1	–	0
Sewanee		–		5	–	1	–	1
Navy		–		5	–	2	–	0
Georgetown		–		4	–	2	–	1
Virginia		–		3	–	2	–	1
Vanderbilt		–		4	–	4	–	0
Alabama		–		2	–	2	–	0
Auburn		–		2	–	2	–	0
Georgia		–		1	–	1	–	0
Virginia A&M		–		1	–	1	–	0
Western Maryland		–		0	–	0	–	1
Richmond		–		2	–	3	–	0
Delaware		–		1	–	2	–	2
Kentucky A&M		–		2	–	4	–	1
Tennessee		–		2	–	5	–	0
Mercer		–		1	–	2	–	0
Trinity (NC)		–		1	–	3	–	0
Hampden–Sydney		–		0	–	1	–	0
Livingstone		–		0	–	1	–	0
Maryville (TN)		–		0	–	1	–	0
South Carolina		–		0	–	1	–	0
Georgia Tech		–		0	–	3	–	0
Maryland		–		0	–	3	–	0

The 1892 Hampden–Sydney football team represented Hampden–Sydney College during the 1892 college football season. In the fall of 1892, William Ford Bull brought together the first official football team at Hampden–Sydney. The 1892 team played just one game, falling 0–24 at home to Richmond College.

== Schedule ==
Opponent	Site	Result
Richmond	Hampden Sydney, VA	L 0–24
