= 1892 Kentucky State College Blue and White football team =

American college football season

1892 Kentucky State College Blue and White football
- Conference: Independent
- Record: 2–4–1
- Head coach: A. M. Miller and John Thompson (1st season)
- Captain: Ed Hodby

1892 Southern college football independents records
| | Conf. | | | Overall |
| Team | W | L | T | W | | L | | T |
|---|---|---|---|---|---|---|---|---|
| Centre | | – | | 6 | – | 0 | – | 0 |
| Biddle | | – | | 1 | – | 0 | – | 0 |
| Furman | | – | | 1 | – | 0 | – | 0 |
| North Carolina A&M | | – | | 1 | – | 0 | – | 0 |
| Virginia Military | | – | | 4 | – | 0 | – | 1 |
| Wake Forest | | – | | 4 | – | 0 | – | 1 |
| Johns Hopkins | | – | | 7 | – | 1 | – | 0 |
| North Carolina | | – | | 5 | – | 1 | – | 0 |
| Central (KY) | | – | | 4 | – | 1 | – | 0 |
| Sewanee | | – | | 5 | – | 1 | – | 1 |
| Navy | | – | | 5 | – | 2 | – | 0 |
| Georgetown | | – | | 4 | – | 2 | – | 1 |
| Virginia | | – | | 3 | – | 2 | – | 1 |
| Vanderbilt | | – | | 4 | – | 4 | – | 0 |
| Alabama | | – | | 2 | – | 2 | – | 0 |
| Auburn | | – | | 2 | – | 2 | – | 0 |
| Georgia | | – | | 1 | – | 1 | – | 0 |
| Virginia A&M | | – | | 1 | – | 1 | – | 0 |
| Western Maryland | | – | | 0 | – | 0 | – | 1 |
| Richmond | | – | | 2 | – | 3 | – | 0 |
| Delaware | | – | | 1 | – | 2 | – | 2 |
| Kentucky A&M | | – | | 2 | – | 4 | – | 1 |
| Tennessee | | – | | 2 | – | 5 | – | 0 |
| Mercer | | – | | 1 | – | 2 | – | 0 |
| Trinity (NC) | | – | | 1 | – | 3 | – | 0 |
| Hampden–Sydney | | – | | 0 | – | 1 | – | 0 |
| Livingstone | | – | | 0 | – | 1 | – | 0 |
| Maryville (TN) | | – | | 0 | – | 1 | – | 0 |
| South Carolina | | – | | 0 | – | 1 | – | 0 |
| Georgia Tech | | – | | 0 | – | 3 | – | 0 |
| Maryland | | – | | 0 | – | 3 | – | 0 |

The 1892 Kentucky State College Blue and White football team represented Kentucky State College—now known as the University of Kentucky—as an independent during the 1892 college football season.

A. M. Miller and John Thompson were listed as head coaches; the team had not had a head coach in their previous seasons. Thompson would coach alone in the following season. The Blue and White compiled a record of 2–4–1.

== Schedule ==
| Date | Opponent | Site | Result | Source |
|---|---|---|---|---|
| October 29 | Kentucky University (Note: now Transylvania University) | Lexington, KY (rivalry) | T 0–0 | |
| | Central (KY) | | L 6–8 | |
| | Central (KY) | | L 4–8 | |
| | Louisville Athletic Club | | W 14–10 | |
| | Virginia Military | | L 0–34 | |
| | Central (KY) | | L 6–10 | |
| December 10 | Kentucky University | | W 10–4 | |
