= 1892 Wake Forest Baptists football team =

American college football season

1892 Wake Forest Baptists football
- Conference: Independent
- Record: 4–0–1
- Head coach: E. Walter Sikes (2nd season)
- Captain: George Blanton

1892 Southern college football independents records
	Conf.			Overall
Team	W	L	T	W		L		T
Centre		–		6	–	0	–	0
Biddle		–		1	–	0	–	0
Furman		–		1	–	0	–	0
North Carolina A&M		–		1	–	0	–	0
Virginia Military		–		4	–	0	–	1
Wake Forest		–		4	–	0	–	1
Johns Hopkins		–		7	–	1	–	0
North Carolina		–		5	–	1	–	0
Central (KY)		–		4	–	1	–	0
Sewanee		–		5	–	1	–	1
Navy		–		5	–	2	–	0
Georgetown		–		4	–	2	–	1
Virginia		–		3	–	2	–	1
Vanderbilt		–		4	–	4	–	0
Alabama		–		2	–	2	–	0
Auburn		–		2	–	2	–	0
Georgia		–		1	–	1	–	0
Virginia A&M		–		1	–	1	–	0
Western Maryland		–		0	–	0	–	1
Richmond		–		2	–	3	–	0
Delaware		–		1	–	2	–	2
Kentucky A&M		–		2	–	4	–	1
Tennessee		–		2	–	5	–	0
Mercer		–		1	–	2	–	0
Trinity (NC)		–		1	–	3	–	0
Hampden–Sydney		–		0	–	1	–	0
Livingstone		–		0	–	1	–	0
Maryville (TN)		–		0	–	1	–	0
South Carolina		–		0	–	1	–	0
Georgia Tech		–		0	–	3	–	0
Maryland		–		0	–	3	–	0

The 1892 Wake Forest Baptists football team was an American football team that represented Wake Forest College during the 1892 college football season.

== Schedule ==
Date	Time	Opponent	Site	Result	Attendance	Source
May 18		vs. Asheville Athletics	Latta Park; Charlotte, NC	W 40–0		
October 21		at VMI	Lexington, VA	T 12–12		
October 22		at Washington and Lee	Lexington, VA	W 16–0		
October 24	3:30 p.m.	at Richmond	Island Park; Richmond, VA	W 16–0	200	
November 24		at Tennessee	Waite Field; Knoxville, TN	W 10–6		
All times are in Eastern time
