= Ernest West =

Ernest West may refer to:

- Ernest West (politician) (1907–?), Australian politician
- Ernest E. West (1931–2021), American soldier
- Ernest E. West (American football) (1867–1914), American football player and coach
