= 1892 Centre football team =

American college football season

1892 Centre football
- Conference: Independent
- Record: 6–0
- Head coach: W. Durant Berry (2nd season)

1892 Southern college football independents records
	Conf.			Overall
Team	W	L	T	W		L		T
Centre		–		6	–	0	–	0
Biddle		–		1	–	0	–	0
Furman		–		1	–	0	–	0
North Carolina A&M		–		1	–	0	–	0
Virginia Military		–		4	–	0	–	1
Wake Forest		–		4	–	0	–	1
Johns Hopkins		–		7	–	1	–	0
North Carolina		–		5	–	1	–	0
Central (KY)		–		4	–	1	–	0
Sewanee		–		5	–	1	–	1
Navy		–		5	–	2	–	0
Georgetown		–		4	–	2	–	1
Virginia		–		3	–	2	–	1
Vanderbilt		–		4	–	4	–	0
Alabama		–		2	–	2	–	0
Auburn		–		2	–	2	–	0
Georgia		–		1	–	1	–	0
Virginia A&M		–		1	–	1	–	0
Western Maryland		–		0	–	0	–	1
Richmond		–		2	–	3	–	0
Delaware		–		1	–	2	–	2
Kentucky A&M		–		2	–	4	–	1
Tennessee		–		2	–	5	–	0
Mercer		–		1	–	2	–	0
Trinity (NC)		–		1	–	3	–	0
Hampden–Sydney		–		0	–	1	–	0
Livingstone		–		0	–	1	–	0
Maryville (TN)		–		0	–	1	–	0
South Carolina		–		0	–	1	–	0
Georgia Tech		–		0	–	3	–	0
Maryland		–		0	–	3	–	0

The 1892 Centre football team represented Centre College as an independent during the 1892 college football season. Led by second-year head coach W. Durant Berry, Centre compiled a record of 6–0.

== Schedule ==
Date	Time	Opponent	Site	Result	Attendance	Source
November 5		Cincinnati	Danville, KY	W 12–4		
November 12		at Louisville Athletic Club	Louisville, KY	W 8–4		
November 24	3:15 p.m.	at Cincinnati	East End Athletic Grounds; Cincinnati, OH	W 34–0	1,000	
December 2		Miami (OH)	Danville, KY	W 12–6		
December 22		Central (KY)	Lexington, KY	W 24–8		
		Kentucky University	Lexington, KY	W 6–4		
