= 1892 Richmond Colts football team =

American college football season

1892 Richmond Colts football
- Conference: Independent
- Record: 2–3
- Head coach: Penwick Shelton (1st season)
- Captain: Frank W. Duke
- Home stadium: Island Park

1892 Southern college football independents records
	Conf.			Overall
Team	W	L	T	W		L		T
Centre		–		6	–	0	–	0
Biddle		–		1	–	0	–	0
Furman		–		1	–	0	–	0
North Carolina A&M		–		1	–	0	–	0
Virginia Military		–		4	–	0	–	1
Wake Forest		–		4	–	0	–	1
Johns Hopkins		–		7	–	1	–	0
North Carolina		–		5	–	1	–	0
Central (KY)		–		4	–	1	–	0
Sewanee		–		5	–	1	–	1
Navy		–		5	–	2	–	0
Georgetown		–		4	–	2	–	1
Virginia		–		3	–	2	–	1
Vanderbilt		–		4	–	4	–	0
Alabama		–		2	–	2	–	0
Auburn		–		2	–	2	–	0
Georgia		–		1	–	1	–	0
Virginia A&M		–		1	–	1	–	0
Western Maryland		–		0	–	0	–	1
Richmond		–		2	–	3	–	0
Delaware		–		1	–	2	–	2
Kentucky A&M		–		2	–	4	–	1
Tennessee		–		2	–	5	–	0
Mercer		–		1	–	2	–	0
Trinity (NC)		–		1	–	3	–	0
Hampden–Sydney		–		0	–	1	–	0
Livingstone		–		0	–	1	–	0
Maryville (TN)		–		0	–	1	–	0
South Carolina		–		0	–	1	–	0
Georgia Tech		–		0	–	3	–	0
Maryland		–		0	–	3	–	0

The 1892 Richmond Colts football team was an American football team that represented Richmond College—now known as the University of Richmond—as an independent during the 1892 college football season. Led by Penwick Shelton in his first and only year as head coach, Richmond compiled a record of 2–3.

== Schedule ==
Date	Time	Opponent	Site	Result	Attendance	Source
October 15	3:30 p.m.	Washington and Lee	Island Park; Richmond, VA	L 6–8	350	
October 21	3:40 p.m.	North Carolina	Island Park; Richmond, VA	L 0–40	400	
October 24	3:30 p.m.	Wake Forest	Island Park; Richmond, VA	L 0–16	200	
November 24		at Hampden–Sydney	Hampden Sydney, VA	W 24–0		
December 19		at Randolph–Macon	Ashland, VA	W 16–0		
