= 1892 Mercer Baptists football team =

American college football season

1892 Mercer Baptists football
- Conference: Independent
- Record: 1–2
- Head coach: Dave Beggs (1st season; first 2 games); None (Game 3)
- Captain: Dave Beggs
- Home stadium: Central City Park

1892 Southern college football independents records
	Conf.			Overall
Team	W	L	T	W		L		T
Centre		–		6	–	0	–	0
Biddle		–		1	–	0	–	0
Furman		–		1	–	0	–	0
North Carolina A&M		–		1	–	0	–	0
Virginia Military		–		4	–	0	–	1
Wake Forest		–		4	–	0	–	1
Johns Hopkins		–		7	–	1	–	0
North Carolina		–		5	–	1	–	0
Central (KY)		–		4	–	1	–	0
Sewanee		–		5	–	1	–	1
Navy		–		5	–	2	–	0
Georgetown		–		4	–	2	–	1
Virginia		–		3	–	2	–	1
Vanderbilt		–		4	–	4	–	0
Alabama		–		2	–	2	–	0
Auburn		–		2	–	2	–	0
Georgia		–		1	–	1	–	0
Virginia A&M		–		1	–	1	–	0
Western Maryland		–		0	–	0	–	1
Richmond		–		2	–	3	–	0
Delaware		–		1	–	2	–	2
Kentucky A&M		–		2	–	4	–	1
Tennessee		–		2	–	5	–	0
Mercer		–		1	–	2	–	0
Trinity (NC)		–		1	–	3	–	0
Hampden–Sydney		–		0	–	1	–	0
Livingstone		–		0	–	1	–	0
Maryville (TN)		–		0	–	1	–	0
South Carolina		–		0	–	1	–	0
Georgia Tech		–		0	–	3	–	0
Maryland		–		0	–	3	–	0

The 1892 Mercer Baptists football team represented Mercer University in the 1892 college football season. They finished with a record of 1–2, and secured their first win in program history with a score of 12–6 in their game against Georgia Tech.

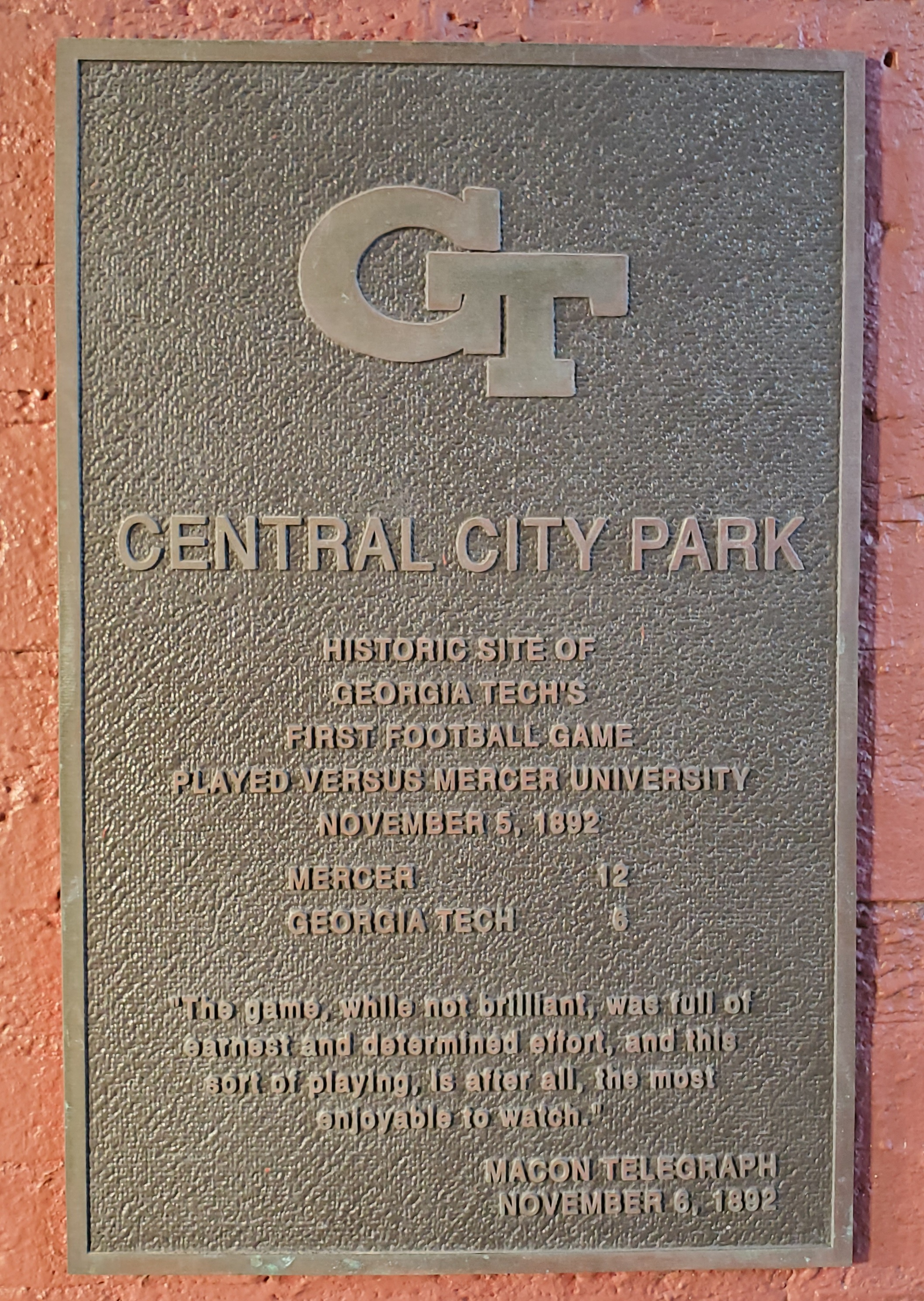
Plaque at Luther Williams Field recognizing the game against Georgia Tech

== Schedule ==
Date	Opponent	Site	Result	Attendance	Source
January 30, 1892	at Georgia	Herty Field; Athens, GA	L 0–50	1,500	
March 26, 1892	Savannah Catholic Library Association	Central City Park; Macon, GA	L 2–20		
November 5, 1892	Georgia Tech	Central City Park; Macon, GA	W 12–6	c. 250	
