= 1892 Georgetown football team =

American college football season

1892 Georgetown football
- Conference: Independent
- Record: 4–2–1
- Head coach: Tommy Dowd (2nd season)
- Captain: Bob Carmody
- Home stadium: Boundary Field

1892 Southern college football independents records
	Conf.			Overall
Team	W	L	T	W		L		T
Centre		–		6	–	0	–	0
Biddle		–		1	–	0	–	0
Furman		–		1	–	0	–	0
North Carolina A&M		–		1	–	0	–	0
Virginia Military		–		4	–	0	–	1
Wake Forest		–		4	–	0	–	1
Johns Hopkins		–		7	–	1	–	0
North Carolina		–		5	–	1	–	0
Central (KY)		–		4	–	1	–	0
Sewanee		–		5	–	1	–	1
Navy		–		5	–	2	–	0
Georgetown		–		4	–	2	–	1
Virginia		–		3	–	2	–	1
Vanderbilt		–		4	–	4	–	0
Alabama		–		2	–	2	–	0
Auburn		–		2	–	2	–	0
Georgia		–		1	–	1	–	0
Virginia A&M		–		1	–	1	–	0
Western Maryland		–		0	–	0	–	1
Richmond		–		2	–	3	–	0
Delaware		–		1	–	2	–	2
Kentucky A&M		–		2	–	4	–	1
Tennessee		–		2	–	5	–	0
Mercer		–		1	–	2	–	0
Trinity (NC)		–		1	–	3	–	0
Hampden–Sydney		–		0	–	1	–	0
Livingstone		–		0	–	1	–	0
Maryville (TN)		–		0	–	1	–	0
South Carolina		–		0	–	1	–	0
Georgia Tech		–		0	–	3	–	0
Maryland		–		0	–	3	–	0

The 1892 Georgetown football team represented the Georgetown University during the 1892 college football season. Georgetown finished the season with a 4–2–1 record. Tommy Dowd, who also played baseball for the Washington Senators, served as Georgetown's head coach for the second season. They played home games at Boundary Park, also the home venue for the Senators.

== Schedule ==
Date	Opponent	Site	Result
October 26	Media Academy	Boundary Field; Washington, DC	W 32–5
November 5	Neptune BC	Boundary Field; Washington, DC	W 96–0
November 6	at Virginia	Madison Hall Field; Charlottesville, VA	T 4–4
November 9	Temperance Athletic Club (PA)	Boundary Field; Washington, DC	W 16–0
November 11	Mount St. Mary's	Boundary Field; Washington, DC	L 0–6
November 19	at Navy	Worden Field; Annapolis, MD	L 0–40
November 26	Columbia Athletic Club	Boundary Field; Washington, DC	W 12–0
