= 1892 Navy Midshipmen football team =

American college football season

1892 Navy Midshipmen football
- Conference: Independent
- Record: 5–2
- Head coach: Ben Crosby (1st season)
- Captain: Martin Trench
- Home stadium: Worden Field

1892 Southern college football independents records
	Conf.			Overall
Team	W	L	T	W		L		T
Centre		–		6	–	0	–	0
Biddle		–		1	–	0	–	0
Furman		–		1	–	0	–	0
North Carolina A&M		–		1	–	0	–	0
Virginia Military		–		4	–	0	–	1
Wake Forest		–		4	–	0	–	1
Johns Hopkins		–		7	–	1	–	0
North Carolina		–		5	–	1	–	0
Central (KY)		–		4	–	1	–	0
Sewanee		–		5	–	1	–	1
Navy		–		5	–	2	–	0
Georgetown		–		4	–	2	–	1
Virginia		–		3	–	2	–	1
Vanderbilt		–		4	–	4	–	0
Alabama		–		2	–	2	–	0
Auburn		–		2	–	2	–	0
Georgia		–		1	–	1	–	0
Virginia A&M		–		1	–	1	–	0
Western Maryland		–		0	–	0	–	1
Richmond		–		2	–	3	–	0
Delaware		–		1	–	2	–	2
Kentucky A&M		–		2	–	4	–	1
Tennessee		–		2	–	5	–	0
Mercer		–		1	–	2	–	0
Trinity (NC)		–		1	–	3	–	0
Hampden–Sydney		–		0	–	1	–	0
Livingstone		–		0	–	1	–	0
Maryville (TN)		–		0	–	1	–	0
South Carolina		–		0	–	1	–	0
Georgia Tech		–		0	–	3	–	0
Maryland		–		0	–	3	–	0

The 1892 Navy Midshipmen football team represented the United States Naval Academy during the 1892 college football season. In their first and only season under head coach Ben Crosby, the Midshipmen compiled a 5–2 record and outscored their opponents by a combined score of 121 to 62.

== Schedule ==
Date	Opponent	Site	Result	Attendance	Source
October 12	Penn	Worden Field; Annapolis, MD	L 0–16		
October 15	Princeton	Worden Field; Annapolis, MD	L 0–28	900	
October 22	Lafayette	Worden Field; Annapolis, MD	W 22–4		
October 29	Franklin & Marshall	Worden Field; Annapolis, MD	W 24–0		
November 5	Rutgers	Worden Field; Annapolis, MD	W 48–12		
November 19	Georgetown	Worden Field; Annapolis, MD	W 40–0		
November 26	at Army	The Plain; West Point, NY (Army–Navy Game)	W 12–4	3,000	
