= 1892 Alabama Cadets football team =

American college football season

1892 Alabama Cadets football
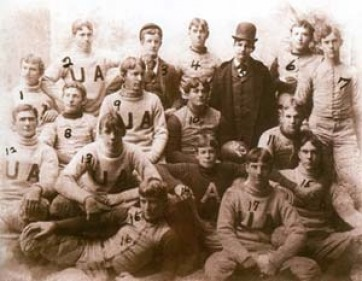
- Conference: Independent
- Record: 2–2
- Head coach: E. B. Beaumont (1st season)
- Captain: William G. Little
- Home stadium: Lakeview Park

1892 Southern college football independents records
	Conf.			Overall
Team	W	L	T	W		L		T
Centre		–		6	–	0	–	0
Biddle		–		1	–	0	–	0
Furman		–		1	–	0	–	0
North Carolina A&M		–		1	–	0	–	0
Virginia Military		–		4	–	0	–	1
Wake Forest		–		4	–	0	–	1
Johns Hopkins		–		7	–	1	–	0
North Carolina		–		5	–	1	–	0
Central (KY)		–		4	–	1	–	0
Sewanee		–		5	–	1	–	1
Navy		–		5	–	2	–	0
Georgetown		–		4	–	2	–	1
Virginia		–		3	–	2	–	1
Vanderbilt		–		4	–	4	–	0
Alabama		–		2	–	2	–	0
Auburn		–		2	–	2	–	0
Georgia		–		1	–	1	–	0
Virginia A&M		–		1	–	1	–	0
Western Maryland		–		0	–	0	–	1
Richmond		–		2	–	3	–	0
Delaware		–		1	–	2	–	2
Kentucky A&M		–		2	–	4	–	1
Tennessee		–		2	–	5	–	0
Mercer		–		1	–	2	–	0
Trinity (NC)		–		1	–	3	–	0
Hampden–Sydney		–		0	–	1	–	0
Livingstone		–		0	–	1	–	0
Maryville (TN)		–		0	–	1	–	0
South Carolina		–		0	–	1	–	0
Georgia Tech		–		0	–	3	–	0
Maryland		–		0	–	3	–	0

The 1892 Alabama Cadets football team represented the University of Alabama in the 1892 college football season. The team was led by their head coach E. B. Beaumont and played their home games at Lakeview Park in Birmingham, Alabama. In what was the inaugural season of Alabama football, the team finished with a record of two wins and two losses (2–2).

William Little of Livingston, Alabama is credited with being responsible for the introduction of football at the university. After playing the game in 1891 while in attendance at a northern prep school, Little returned to Alabama where he helped establish the first team at the university for the 1892 season. The first game in Alabama football history was played on November 11, 1892, against Birmingham High School and was won by the Cadets 56–0. They then split a pair of games with the Birmingham Athletic Club, and closed out the season with a 32–22 loss in the first Iron Bowl against Auburn on February 22, 1893. After the season, Beaumont was fired as head coach and replaced by Eli Abbott for the 1893 season.

== Schedule ==
Date	Opponent	Site	Result
November 11	Birmingham High School	Lakeview Park; Birmingham, AL	W 56–0
November 12	Birmingham Athletic Club	Lakeview Park; Birmingham, AL	L 4–5
December 10	Birmingham Athletic Club	Lakeview Park; Birmingham, AL	W 14–0
February 22, 1893 (Note: Although played in 1893, Alabama considers the game against Auburn as the final game of the 1892 season. On the contrary, Auburn considers the game as their first of the 1893 season.)	Auburn	Lakeview Park; Birmingham, AL (rivalry)	L 22–32

(Note: For the 1892 season, point values were different from those used in contemporary games. In 1892 a touchdown was worth four points, a field goal was worth five points and an extra point was worth two points.)

== Background ==
The first college football game was played on November 6, 1869, between Rutgers and the College of New Jersey. Although the sport continued to grow, it was not introduced for another 23 years at Alabama. The man credited with the introduction of football at Alabama was William G. Little of Livingston. Little attended Phillips Academy in Andover, Massachusetts for the 1891–92 school year. It was there that he first played and became an advocate for football. Originally he intended to attend Yale University. However, after his brother died, Little returned to Livingston in 1892 and enrolled at Alabama. He proposed the university field a football team, which was introduced for the 1892 season. Alabama selected Little as the first team captain for the inaugural 1892 season. The team was called the "Cadets", as the current "Crimson Tide" moniker was not used until 1907.

== Game summaries ==
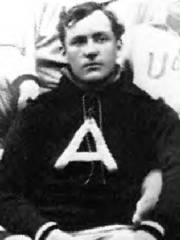
Eli Abbott played tackle for the 1892 team and later became Alabama's head coach.

=== Birmingham High School ===
In what was the first ever game played by the University of Alabama, a team of Birmingham-area high school players lost to the Cadets 56–0 at Birmingham's Lakeview Park. Played on November 11, the game served as a practice game for Alabama's contest against the Birmingham Athletic Club scheduled for the next day. Although details of the second half are unavailable, touchdowns in the first half were scored by David Grayson, G. H. Kyser, Dan Smith (twice), William Little and T. S. Frazer. The play utilized most throughout the game was a rushing formation developed by Harvard earlier in the season called the flying wedge.

=== Birmingham Athletic Club (November) ===
A day after their victory over Birmingham High School, Alabama suffered their first all-time loss against the Birmingham Athletic Club (B.A.C.) 5–4. In a game noted for numerous fumbles by both squads, Alabama scored first and took a 4–0 lead on a William G. Little touchdown run late in the first half. However, the B.A.C. won the game 5–4 late in the second half when J. P. Ross successfully kicked a 63-yard field goal on a drop kick. Alabama would not lose another game by a single point until their 1947 game against Tulane.

=== Birmingham Athletic Club (December) ===
A month after their loss to the B.A.C., Alabama returned to Lakeview Park and defeated the Athletics 14–0. David Grayson scored first on a 65-yard touchdown run to give Alabama a 4–0 lead after a missed extra point. In the second half, both Robert Cope and Eli Abbott scored touchdowns and one G. H. Kyser extra point gave Alabama the 14–0 victory.

=== Auburn ===
Before 5,000 fans at Birmingham's Lakeview Park, Alabama lost to the Agricultural & Mechanical College of Alabama (now known as Auburn University) 32–22 in the first of what was subsequently dubbed the Iron Bowl. Auburn scored first on a 20-yard Rufus Dorsey touchdown run and again on a one-yard Dorsey run and took an 8–0 lead early in the first half. Frank Savage then scored Alabama's first touchdown on a 10-yard run and William B. Bankhead converted a successful extra point to cut the Auburn lead to 8–6. After Auburn scored a third touchdown to go up 14–6, Alabama responded with a 20-yard Dan Smith touchdown run and G. H. Kyser extra point to make the halftime score 14–12 in favor of Auburn.

In the second half, Auburn scored first again when Dorsey recovered an Alabama fumble and returned it 65-yards for a touchdown. After a successful extra point the blue and orange extended their lead to 20–12. Alabama responded on their following possession with a 30-yard William Little touchdown run and Kyser extra point to cut the lead to 20–18. Thomas Daniels then scored Auburn's final two touchdowns on runs of one and 25 yards and also converted both extra points to give them a 32–18 lead. Smith scored the final points of the game late in the second half for Alabama on a short run that made the final score 32–22.

== Players ==
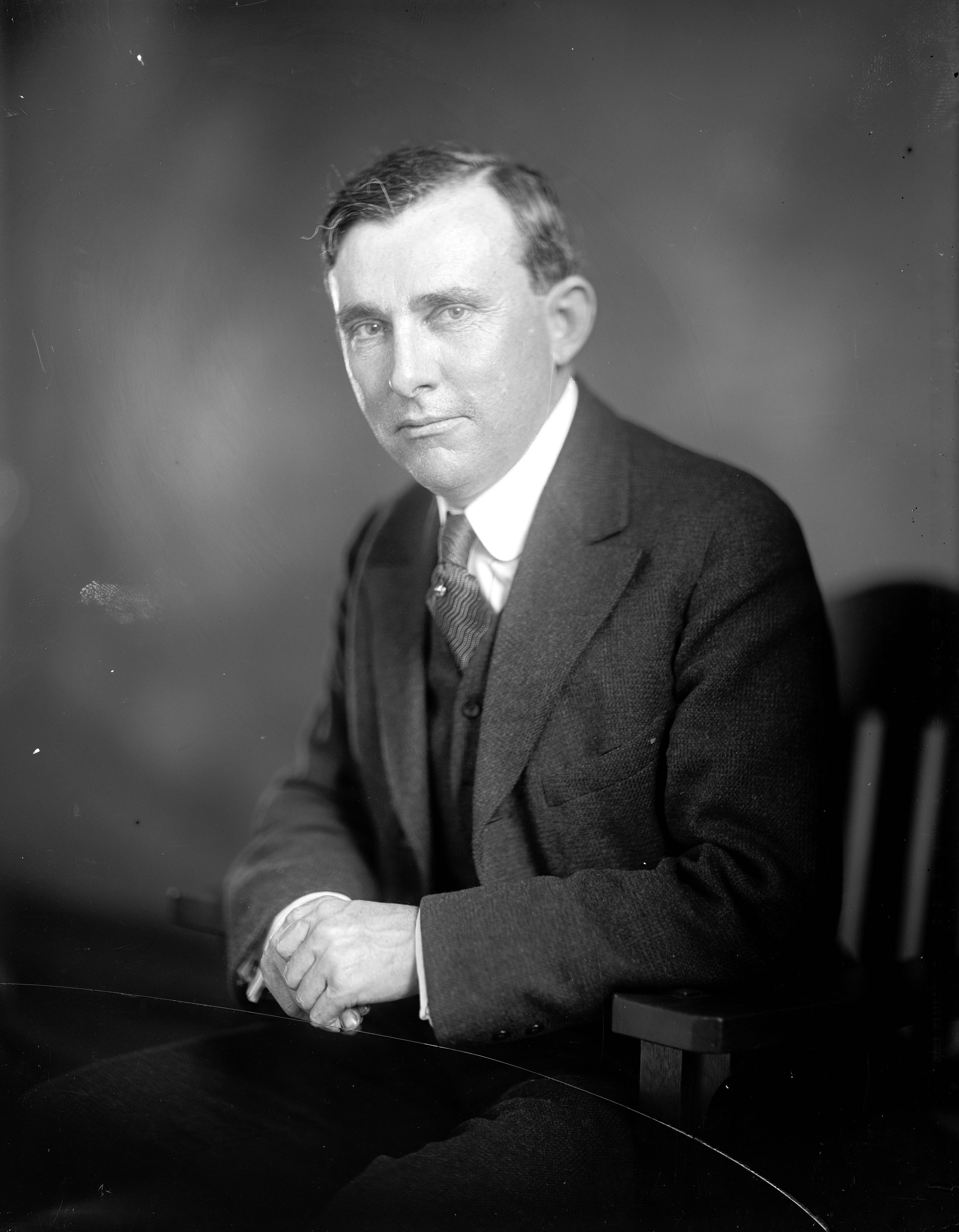
Bibb Graves was a substitute for the 1892 team and later became Governor of Alabama.

The following players were members of the 1892 football team according to the roster published in the 1893 edition of The Corolla, the University of Alabama yearbook.

Alabama Cadets 1892 roster
Quarterback: William Walker; Guards: Robert Cope; William Little; Henry Pratt; Tackles: Eli Abbott; Frank Savage	Ends: Burr Furguson; David Grayson; Halfbacks: William B. Bankhead; G. H. Kyser; Dan Smith	Substitutes: T. S. Frazer; Bibb Graves; S. W. Henderson; D. B. Johnson; Allen McCants; C. C. Nesmith; M. P. Walker

== After the season ==
Although they finished with a .500 record, after the completion of the season, E. B. Beaumont was fired as Alabama's head coach. The 1894 edition of the university yearbook The Corolla stated of the Beaumont firing:

"We were unfortunate in securing a coach. After keeping him for a short time, we found that his knowledge of the game was very limited. We, therefore, 'got rid of' him."

After Beaumont's departure, William G. Little continued the training of the team until Abbott was selected to serve as head coach for the 1893 season. Other notable players from the first Alabama team included William B. Bankhead who served as the Speaker of the United States House of Representatives from 1936 to 1940 and Bibb Graves who served as the 38th Governor of Alabama from 1927 to 1931 and again from 1935 to 1939.
