= 1892 Georgia Tech football team =

American college football season

1892 Georgia Tech football
- Conference: Independent
- Record: 0–3–0
- Head coach: Ernest West (1st season)
- Captain: Ernest West
- Home stadium: Piedmont Park, Brisbine Park

1892 Southern college football independents records
| | Conf. | | | Overall |
| Team | W | L | T | W | | L | | T |
|---|---|---|---|---|---|---|---|---|
| Centre | | – | | 6 | – | 0 | – | 0 |
| Biddle | | – | | 1 | – | 0 | – | 0 |
| Furman | | – | | 1 | – | 0 | – | 0 |
| North Carolina A&M | | – | | 1 | – | 0 | – | 0 |
| Virginia Military | | – | | 4 | – | 0 | – | 1 |
| Wake Forest | | – | | 4 | – | 0 | – | 1 |
| Johns Hopkins | | – | | 7 | – | 1 | – | 0 |
| North Carolina | | – | | 5 | – | 1 | – | 0 |
| Central (KY) | | – | | 4 | – | 1 | – | 0 |
| Sewanee | | – | | 5 | – | 1 | – | 1 |
| Navy | | – | | 5 | – | 2 | – | 0 |
| Georgetown | | – | | 4 | – | 2 | – | 1 |
| Virginia | | – | | 3 | – | 2 | – | 1 |
| Vanderbilt | | – | | 4 | – | 4 | – | 0 |
| Alabama | | – | | 2 | – | 2 | – | 0 |
| Auburn | | – | | 2 | – | 2 | – | 0 |
| Georgia | | – | | 1 | – | 1 | – | 0 |
| Virginia A&M | | – | | 1 | – | 1 | – | 0 |
| Western Maryland | | – | | 0 | – | 0 | – | 1 |
| Richmond | | – | | 2 | – | 3 | – | 0 |
| Delaware | | – | | 1 | – | 2 | – | 2 |
| Kentucky A&M | | – | | 2 | – | 4 | – | 1 |
| Tennessee | | – | | 2 | – | 5 | – | 0 |
| Mercer | | – | | 1 | – | 2 | – | 0 |
| Trinity (NC) | | – | | 1 | – | 3 | – | 0 |
| Hampden–Sydney | | – | | 0 | – | 1 | – | 0 |
| Livingstone | | – | | 0 | – | 1 | – | 0 |
| Maryville (TN) | | – | | 0 | – | 1 | – | 0 |
| South Carolina | | – | | 0 | – | 1 | – | 0 |
| Georgia Tech | | – | | 0 | – | 3 | – | 0 |
| Maryland | | – | | 0 | – | 3 | – | 0 |

The 1892 Georgia Tech football team represented the Georgia School of Technology during the 1892 college football season. It was the team's inaugural season, only seven years after the school's founding. Led by Ernest West, a Georgia Tech professor in his first and only season as head coach, the Techs compiled a record of 0–3. West, who had previously played football at Navy, also served as Georgia Tech's captain.

Professors West and Frank Spain began training the new team by October, holding practices each afternoon in the area of what would become Bobby Dodd Stadium. The team was also placed on a diet consisting of milk, crust of bread or toast, rare steak or mutton chops, and fruits for breakfast; ale, rare roast beef or ribs of roast, chicken, Irish potatoes, and toast for lunch; and cold meats, crust of toast, and milk or ale, for dinner. The team incorporated a 'V' formation that was being used at the time by football powerhouse Princeton.

The Techs received challenges to play from Mercer, Auburn, and Trinity (later Duke). Contracts with Mercer and Auburn, and games were later proposed against Vanderbilt and North Carolina. However, Georgia Tech's faculty would not allow them to accept every game invitation.

The team used white and gold as its colors, which caught on as Georgia Tech's traditional colors. The newspapers referred to the team as the Techs throughout the season. Fans created a standard cheer to be yelled out during the game:

  Tech–ity–Techs!  Who–Rex!  Who–Rex!
  Tech–ity–Techs!  Who–Rex!  Who–Rex!
  Boom–Rah!!  Boom–Rah!!
  Georgia!!!

During the season, there was extensive planning in creating a southern athletic association, of which Frank Spain was a prominent proponent. An attempt was made to create the Southern Inter-Collegiate Athletic Association (SIAA) while several schools were playing a series of football games in Atlanta the week of November 21, 1892. However, the organization did not formalize until a second attempt was made on December 28 in Richmond, Virginia. Georgia Tech did not participate in this later meeting and did not join the SIAA until 1896.

== Schedule ==
| Date | Time | Opponent | Site | Result | Attendance | Source |
|---|---|---|---|---|---|---|
| October 29 | | at Mercer | Central City Park; Macon, GA | Postponed (Note: Mercer was unable to secure a playing field so the game was postponed until November 5.) | | |
| November 5 (Note: Replay of game originally scheduled for October 29.) | 3:00 p.m. | at Mercer | Central City Park; Macon, GA | L 6–12 | c. 250 | |
| November 19 | 2:45 p.m. | Vanderbilt | Piedmont Park; Atlanta, GA (rivalry) | L 10–20 | | |
| November 25 | 2:30 p.m. | Auburn | Brisbine Park; Atlanta, GA (rivalry) | L 0–26 | | |
All times are in Eastern time

== Game summaries ==
Georgia Tech Techs (0–0–0) at Mercer Baptists (0–0–0)

| Quarter | 1 | 2 | Total |
|---|---|---|---|
| Georgia Tech | 6 | 0 | 6 |
| Mercer | 8 | 4 | 12 |

at Central City Park • Macon, Georgia

- Date: Saturday, November 5, 1892
- Game time: 3:00 p.m.
- Game attendance: c. 250

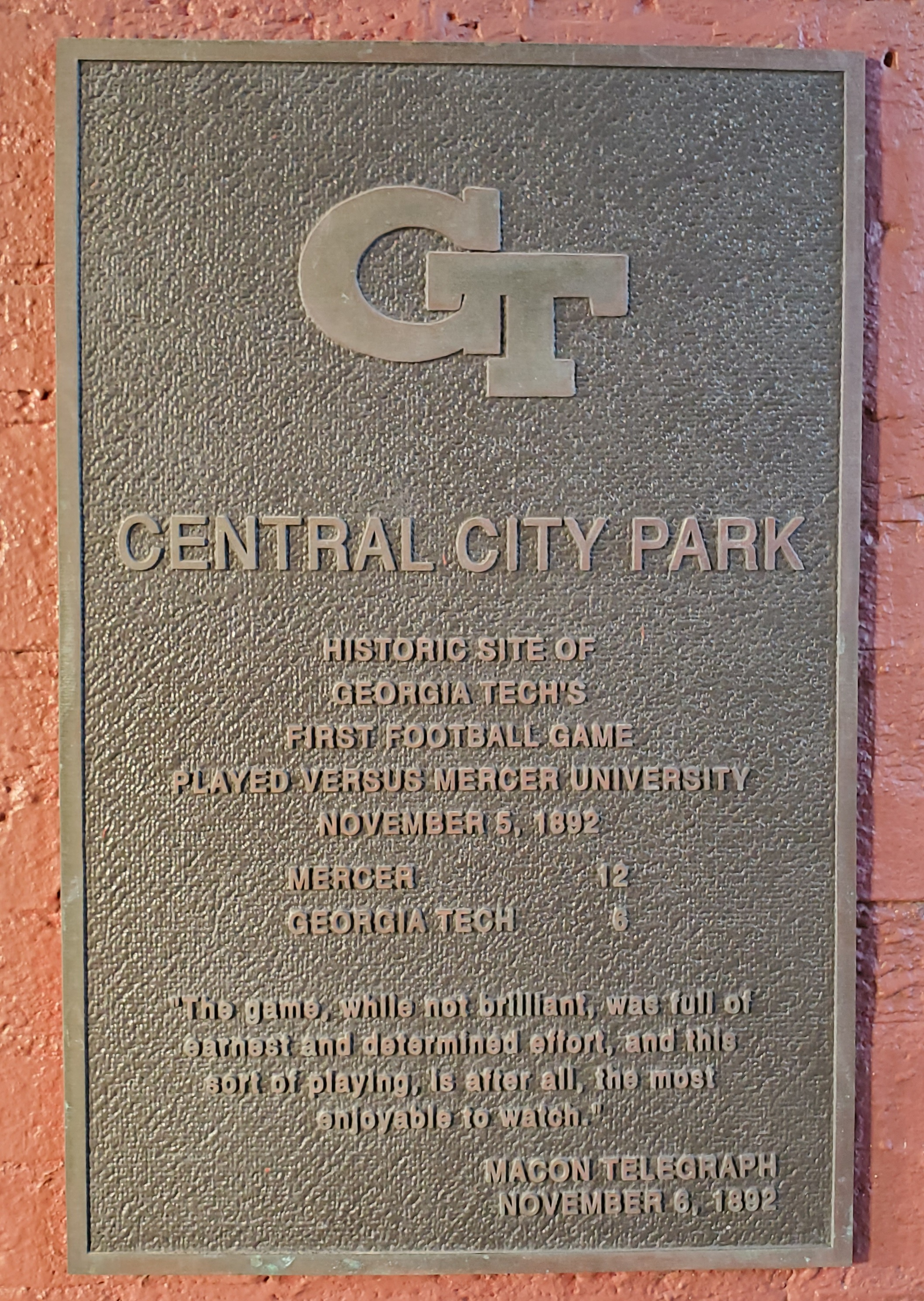
Plaque at Macon's Luther Williams Field commemorating Georgia Tech's first football game

Georgia Tech's first ever game took place against Mercer on November 5, 1892, at the Central City Park in Macon, Georgia. The game coincided with Macon's Carnival Week. The game was originally scheduled to have been played on October 29, but was postponed because Mercer had been unable to secure the fairgrounds. The winner of the game was slated to play Vanderbilt, though Georgia Tech played Vanderbilt the next week anyway despite its loss to Mercer.

The afternoon before the game, Tech practiced in full uniform at the Georgia Tech athletic grounds on North Avenue. The team left for Macon at 7:00 a.m. via special train that also carried a hundred fans, mostly schoolmates and friends.

Georgia Tech won the toss, and the game started promptly at 3:00 p.m. It quickly became apparent that Mercer's team was heavier and had better control of the center, whereas Tech was better at tackling and understanding the "science" of the game. However, the passing and judgment of both sides was exceedingly costly. After about twenty-five minutes of play, Harry Miles fumbled a punt and it was recovered by Mercer's Orr. Mercer's Chapman scored a touchdown soon thereafter. About ten minutes to go before halftime, West had one of Tech's longest runs of forty yards; however, the Techs would fumble again, which was recovered by Atkinson and run back for another Mercer touchdown. Georgia Tech finally scored right before halftime after Mercer muffed an attempt to punt the ball, and Stafford Nash ran the recovered fumble back for a touchdown. The half ended with Mercer winning 8 to 6.

In the second half, Mercer played continuously up the center and gained on every down. Ernest West seemed to be the only Tech player able to stop Mercer's backs. Emmet Small, Mercer's halfback, scored another touchdown, but Mercer missed its third goal attempt for extra points of the day. The game became closer as the second half continued on, but Georgia Tech could only proceed into Mercer territory when the ball was loose on the ground. Time was called and Mercer won the game 12 to 6. Georgia Tech returned home on its train at 6:00 p.m.

Vanderbilt Commodores (3–3–0) at Georgia Tech Techs (0–1–0)

| Quarter | 1 | 2 | Total |
|---|---|---|---|
| Vanderbilt | 12 | 8 | 20 |
| Georgia Tech | 6 | 4 | 10 |

at Piedmont Park • Atlanta, Georgia

- Date: Saturday, November 19, 1892
- Game time: 2:45 p.m.
- Game attendance: Unknown

Georgia Tech's second game came against Vanderbilt during "Indian Summer Carnival Week" in Atlanta, which featured football games at Piedmont Park amongst many other activities. It was originally proposed that Tech would play a rematch against Mercer on November 18 and Vanderbilt on November 19, but this was later reduced to only the Vanderbilt game as Mercer was unable to travel. Vanderbilt had already played six games, with a record of 3-3-0, but had not yet played a game outside of Tennessee.

As with the Mercer game, Vanderbilt's weight proved to be a great advantage. Vanderbilt ran a 'V' formation and made good progress in their first possession with a couple of gains of fifteen yards or more and scoring a touchdown within the first three minutes. Georgia Tech's first possession quickly ended in a fumble, however, Vanderbilt soon fumbled the ball back. After several changes in possession and seventeen minutes of play, Vanderbilt was able to score another touchdown through the middle of Georgia Tech's line. On the next Georgia Tech drive, West had a long run of thirty-five yards, but the Techs were unable to advance much further. Vanderbilt once again drove down the field and scored a touchdown through the center. On its final possession of the first half, West missed a field goal, but it was caught by Vanderbilt's Throne who immediately fumbled the ball. Ed Whitney scooped it up and scored a touchdown and Hardin Jones kicked the extra points. The half ended with Vanderbilt winning 12 to 6.

Georgia Tech started with the ball in the second half, but lost the ball on an offsides play. Vanderbilt soon punted and Tech was able to march down the field and score a touchdown by West, though the points after try was missed. Georgia Tech played better defense at the start of the second half, but Vanderbilt's center rushing was too much. Vanderbilt scored another touchdown after twenty-two minutes of play. Georgia Tech did not have an answer and Vanderbilt gained a thirty-yard run after Tech's punt. After exchanges of possession, Vanderbilt eventually made it five yards from the Techs' goal and scored a touchdown on the next play. Vanderbilt missed its extra points try for the fifth time. The game was soon called with Vanderbilt winning 20 to 10. West, Jones, and Will Hunter (later captain of the 1893 team) proved to be Georgia Tech's best players.

Auburn Tigers (0–2–0) at Georgia Tech Techs (0–2–0)

| Quarter | 1 | 2 | Total |
|---|---|---|---|
| Auburn | 20 | 6 | 26 |
| Georgia Tech | 0 | 0 | 0 |

at Brisbine Park • Atlanta, Georgia

- Date: Saturday, November 25, 1892
- Game time: 2:30 p.m.
- Game attendance: "A large crowd"

During the week of Thanksgiving, several collegiate football games were organized in Atlanta in the hopes of creating a yearly "Southern Champion" around the holiday. Dubbed the "first series of intercollegiate football games played in the south," Auburn, North Carolina, Trinity, and Virginia were all scheduled to play games at Brisbine Park. It was during these games that the Southern Intercollegiate Athletic Association was expected to be formed comprising two colleges from each state to determine a state champion, which would then meet in Atlanta each year. Georgia Tech's Frank Spain, the right guard, was one of the organization's promoters, however, the organization did not materialize.

Georgia Tech's opponent during the championship week was Auburn, who had already lost games against Trinity and North Carolina by wide margins that week. Despite Auburn's weight advantage, the Tech players were optimistic based on Auburn's previous performances. Auburn won the toss and started its attack with a 'V' formation, but was not too successful at first. However, after Tech fumbled the ensuing punt, Auburn was able to pound the ball on both the ends and the center, scoring a touchdown seven minutes in. Georgia Tech also used a 'V' formation and made some good initial runs, but the possession changed back and forth until Tech fumbled again, allowing Auburn to score a second touchdown. Tech fumbled the ball again on the next possession and Auburn quickly scored another touchdown. The teams exchanged a series of punts, but Auburn eventually scored following another Georgia Tech fumble. Towards the end of the first half, Auburn's fullback, Long, was knocked unconscious and lost a tooth. The half ended with Auburn winning 20-0.

The second half continued the dominance of Auburn. Despite initial success in running the ball on two early possessions, Georgia Tech was unable to score. Auburn, however, using the speed of its halfback, Dorsey, was able to drive the ball ninety yards on two plays and scored another touchdown. The two teams pushed back and forth for most of the remainder of the half until Georgia Tech declared the game over after twenty-seven minutes. Auburn won with a final score of 26-0. Georgia Tech did not play another game, ending its inaugural season at 0–3.

== Players ==
Georgia Tech Techs 1892 game starters
| | Mercer | Vanderbilt | Auburn |
|---|---|---|---|
| Left end | Ed Werner | Murdock McRae | Murdock McRae |
| Left tackle | Joe Little | Ernest West (C) | Will Hunter |
| Left guard | Trezevant Holmes | Frank Spain | Haralson |
| Center | George Forest | George Forest | Frank Spain |
| Right guard | Frank Spain | Charles Gavan | Charles Gavan |
| Right tackle | Ed Whitney | Ed Werner | Ed Werner |
| Right end | Murdock McRae | Ed Whitney | Ed Whitney |
| Quarterback | Stafford Nash | Stafford Nash | Harry Miles |
| Left Halfback | Ernest West (C) | Kendall | Kendall |
| Right halfback | Will Hunter | Will Hunter | Ernest West (C) |
| Fullback | Harry Miles | Hardin Jones | Hardin Jones |
| Substitutes | Duke Black • Will Heath • H. Long • W. J. Nally | | |
