= 1892 Sewanee Tigers football team =

American college football season

1892 Sewanee Tigers football

State champion
- Conference: Independent
- Record: 5–1–1
- Head coach: F. G. Sweat (2nd season)
- Captain: Alex Shepherd
- Home stadium: Hardee Field

1892 Southern college football independents records
	Conf.			Overall
Team	W	L	T	W		L		T
Centre		–		6	–	0	–	0
Biddle		–		1	–	0	–	0
Furman		–		1	–	0	–	0
North Carolina A&M		–		1	–	0	–	0
Virginia Military		–		4	–	0	–	1
Wake Forest		–		4	–	0	–	1
Johns Hopkins		–		7	–	1	–	0
North Carolina		–		5	–	1	–	0
Central (KY)		–		4	–	1	–	0
Sewanee		–		5	–	1	–	1
Navy		–		5	–	2	–	0
Georgetown		–		4	–	2	–	1
Virginia		–		3	–	2	–	1
Vanderbilt		–		4	–	4	–	0
Alabama		–		2	–	2	–	0
Auburn		–		2	–	2	–	0
Georgia		–		1	–	1	–	0
Virginia A&M		–		1	–	1	–	0
Western Maryland		–		0	–	0	–	1
Richmond		–		2	–	3	–	0
Delaware		–		1	–	2	–	2
Kentucky A&M		–		2	–	4	–	1
Tennessee		–		2	–	5	–	0
Mercer		–		1	–	2	–	0
Trinity (NC)		–		1	–	3	–	0
Hampden–Sydney		–		0	–	1	–	0
Livingstone		–		0	–	1	–	0
Maryville (TN)		–		0	–	1	–	0
South Carolina		–		0	–	1	–	0
Georgia Tech		–		0	–	3	–	0
Maryland		–		0	–	3	–	0

The 1892 Sewanee Tigers football team represented the Sewanee Tigers of Sewanee: The University of the South in the 1892 college football season. In their second season as a full-time squad, the Tigers posted a 5–1–1 record.

== Schedule ==
Date	Time	Opponent	Site	Result	Attendance	Source
October 15		Vanderbilt	Hardee Field; Sewanee, TN (rivalry)	W 22–4		
October 22		Tennessee	Hardee Field; Sewanee, TN	W 54–0		
October 29	2:00 p.m.	vs. Virginia	Island Park; Richmond, VA	L 0–30	700	
October 31		at Washington and Lee	Lexington, VA	W 22–16		
November 2		at Tennessee	Baseball Park; Knoxville, TN	W 10–0		
November 12		at Vanderbilt	Dudley Field; Nashville, TN	W 28–14		
November 24		at Louisville Athletic Club	Louisville, KY	T 6–6		
All times are in Central time
