= 1892 Tennessee Volunteers football team =

American college football season

1892 Tennessee Volunteers football
- Conference: Independent
- Record: 2–5
- Head coach: None
- Captain: Charles C. Moore Jr.
- Home stadium: Baseball Park

1892 Southern college football independents records
| | Conf. | | | Overall |
| Team | W | L | T | W | | L | | T |
|---|---|---|---|---|---|---|---|---|
| Centre | | – | | 6 | – | 0 | – | 0 |
| Biddle | | – | | 1 | – | 0 | – | 0 |
| Furman | | – | | 1 | – | 0 | – | 0 |
| North Carolina A&M | | – | | 1 | – | 0 | – | 0 |
| Virginia Military | | – | | 4 | – | 0 | – | 1 |
| Wake Forest | | – | | 4 | – | 0 | – | 1 |
| Johns Hopkins | | – | | 7 | – | 1 | – | 0 |
| North Carolina | | – | | 5 | – | 1 | – | 0 |
| Central (KY) | | – | | 4 | – | 1 | – | 0 |
| Sewanee | | – | | 5 | – | 1 | – | 1 |
| Navy | | – | | 5 | – | 2 | – | 0 |
| Georgetown | | – | | 4 | – | 2 | – | 1 |
| Virginia | | – | | 3 | – | 2 | – | 1 |
| Vanderbilt | | – | | 4 | – | 4 | – | 0 |
| Alabama | | – | | 2 | – | 2 | – | 0 |
| Auburn | | – | | 2 | – | 2 | – | 0 |
| Georgia | | – | | 1 | – | 1 | – | 0 |
| Virginia A&M | | – | | 1 | – | 1 | – | 0 |
| Western Maryland | | – | | 0 | – | 0 | – | 1 |
| Richmond | | – | | 2 | – | 3 | – | 0 |
| Delaware | | – | | 1 | – | 2 | – | 2 |
| Kentucky A&M | | – | | 2 | – | 4 | – | 1 |
| Tennessee | | – | | 2 | – | 5 | – | 0 |
| Mercer | | – | | 1 | – | 2 | – | 0 |
| Trinity (NC) | | – | | 1 | – | 3 | – | 0 |
| Hampden–Sydney | | – | | 0 | – | 1 | – | 0 |
| Livingstone | | – | | 0 | – | 1 | – | 0 |
| Maryville (TN) | | – | | 0 | – | 1 | – | 0 |
| South Carolina | | – | | 0 | – | 1 | – | 0 |
| Georgia Tech | | – | | 0 | – | 3 | – | 0 |
| Maryland | | – | | 0 | – | 3 | – | 0 |

The 1892 Tennessee Volunteers football team represented the University of Tennessee in the 1892 season. The Volunteers embarked on their second season as a full-time squad. This season saw the Vols win their first game versus Maryville College, in Maryville, Tennessee. As in 1891, this was a student coached squad, made up of ragtag players. This was the first meeting of UT and Vanderbilt in their in-state rivalry game.

== Schedule ==
| Date | Time | Opponent | Site | Result | Source |
|---|---|---|---|---|---|
| October 15 | 3:00 p.m. | at Maryville | Maryville, TN | W 24–0 | |
| October 21 | | at Vanderbilt | Dudley Field; Nashville, TN (rivalry) | L 4–22 | |
| October 22 | | at Sewanee | Hardee Field; Sewanee, TN | L 0–54 | |
| November 2 | 2:30 p.m. | Sewanee | Baseball Park; Knoxville, TN | L 0–10 | |
| November 12 | | vs. Chattanooga Athletic Club | Chattanooga, TN | W 16–6 | |
| November 17 | | Vanderbilt | Baseball Park; Knoxville, TN | L 0–12 | |
| November 24 | | Wake Forest | Baseball Park; Knoxville, TN | L 6–10 | |
All times are in Eastern time
