= 1892 VMI Keydets football team =

American college football season

1892 VMI Keydets football
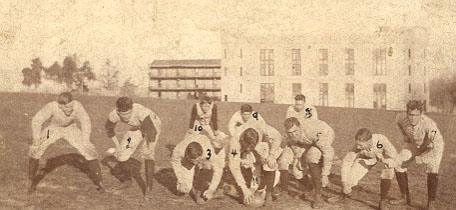
- Conference: Independent
- Record: 4–0–1
- Head coach: None

1892 Southern college football independents records
	Conf.			Overall
Team	W	L	T	W		L		T
Centre		–		6	–	0	–	0
Biddle		–		1	–	0	–	0
Furman		–		1	–	0	–	0
North Carolina A&M		–		1	–	0	–	0
Virginia Military		–		4	–	0	–	1
Wake Forest		–		4	–	0	–	1
Johns Hopkins		–		7	–	1	–	0
North Carolina		–		5	–	1	–	0
Central (KY)		–		4	–	1	–	0
Sewanee		–		5	–	1	–	1
Navy		–		5	–	2	–	0
Georgetown		–		4	–	2	–	1
Virginia		–		3	–	2	–	1
Vanderbilt		–		4	–	4	–	0
Alabama		–		2	–	2	–	0
Auburn		–		2	–	2	–	0
Georgia		–		1	–	1	–	0
Virginia A&M		–		1	–	1	–	0
Western Maryland		–		0	–	0	–	1
Richmond		–		2	–	3	–	0
Delaware		–		1	–	2	–	2
Kentucky A&M		–		2	–	4	–	1
Tennessee		–		2	–	5	–	0
Mercer		–		1	–	2	–	0
Trinity (NC)		–		1	–	3	–	0
Hampden–Sydney		–		0	–	1	–	0
Livingstone		–		0	–	1	–	0
Maryville (TN)		–		0	–	1	–	0
South Carolina		–		0	–	1	–	0
Georgia Tech		–		0	–	3	–	0
Maryland		–		0	–	3	–	0

The 1892 VMI Keydets football team represented the Virginia Military Institute (VMI) in their second season of organized football. The Keydets went 4–0–1, a game better than they were the previous season.

== Schedule ==
Date	Opponent	Site	Result
October 27	St. John's (MD)	Unknown; Lexington, VA	W 18–0
November 11	Wake Forest	Unknown; Lexington, VA	T 12–12
November 19	Trinity (NC)	Unknown; Lexington, VA	W 34–0
November 29	Kentucky State College	Unknown; Lexington, VA	W 34–0
Unknown	Washington and Lee	Unknown; Lexington, VA	W 30–6
