= 1892 North Carolina Tar Heels football team =

American college football season

1892 North Carolina Tar Heels football

Southern co-champion
- Conference: Independent
- Record: 5–1
- Head coach: None
- Captain: Michael Hoke
- Home stadium: Campus Athletic Field (I)

1892 Southern college football independents records
	Conf.			Overall
Team	W	L	T	W		L		T
Centre		–		6	–	0	–	0
Biddle		–		1	–	0	–	0
Furman		–		1	–	0	–	0
North Carolina A&M		–		1	–	0	–	0
Virginia Military		–		4	–	0	–	1
Wake Forest		–		4	–	0	–	1
Johns Hopkins		–		7	–	1	–	0
North Carolina		–		5	–	1	–	0
Central (KY)		–		4	–	1	–	0
Sewanee		–		5	–	1	–	1
Navy		–		5	–	2	–	0
Georgetown		–		4	–	2	–	1
Virginia		–		3	–	2	–	1
Vanderbilt		–		4	–	4	–	0
Alabama		–		2	–	2	–	0
Auburn		–		2	–	2	–	0
Georgia		–		1	–	1	–	0
Virginia A&M		–		1	–	1	–	0
Western Maryland		–		0	–	0	–	1
Richmond		–		2	–	3	–	0
Delaware		–		1	–	2	–	2
Kentucky A&M		–		2	–	4	–	1
Tennessee		–		2	–	5	–	0
Mercer		–		1	–	2	–	0
Trinity (NC)		–		1	–	3	–	0
Hampden–Sydney		–		0	–	1	–	0
Livingstone		–		0	–	1	–	0
Maryville (TN)		–		0	–	1	–	0
South Carolina		–		0	–	1	–	0
Georgia Tech		–		0	–	3	–	0
Maryland		–		0	–	3	–	0

The 1892 North Carolina Tar Heels football team represented the University of North Carolina in the 1892 college football season. They played six games with a final record of 5–1. The team captain for the 1892 season was Michael Hoke. The team claims a southern title even though it was defeated by Virginia, for it beat the Cavaliers in a rematch. Those games with UVA mark the beginning of the South's Oldest Rivalry.

== Schedule ==
Date	Time	Opponent	Site	Result	Attendance	Source
October 21	3:40 p.m.	at Richmond	Island Park; Richmond, VA	W 40–0	400	
October 22		at Virginia	Madison Hall Field; Charlottesville, VA (South's Oldest Rivalry)	L 30–18		
November 12	3:17 p.m.	at Trinity (NC)	Trinity Park; Durham, NC (rivalry)	W 24–0	350	
November 23	2:30 p.m.	vs. Auburn	Brisbine Park; Atlanta, GA	W 64–0		
November 24	3:45 p.m.	at Vanderbilt	Old Dudley Field; Nashville, TN	W 24–0		
November 26	3:00 p.m.	vs. Virginia	Brisbine Park; Atlanta, GA	W 26–0	2,000	

== Players ==
=== Varsity lettermen ===
==== Line ====
Player	Position	Games started	Hometown	Height	Weight	Age
James Crawford Biggs	end		Oxford	5'9"	145	20
Norfleet Mann Gibbs	end			5'10"	170	20
David Alexander Kirkpatrick	guard			6'2"	230	22
George Roscoe Little	tackle			5'11"	168	19
Walter "Pete" Murphy	center		Salisbury	6'0"	200	21
James Thomas Pugh	tackle			5'10"	168	19
Eugene Malcolm Snipes	guard			5'11"	195	24

==== Backfield ====
Player	Position	Games started	Hometown	Height	Weight	Age
Alfred Smith Barnard	quarterback			5'8"	148	18
William Augustus Devin	halfback			6'0"	169	21
Michael Hoke	halfback		Raleigh	5'10"	148	18
Howard Burton Shaw	fullback			5'7"	153	24

==== Substitutes ====
Player	Position	Games started	Hometown	Height	Weight	Age
Charles Baskerville	fullback			5'9"	145	22
Martin Currie	tackle			6'2"	170	29
Louis Isaac Guion	end			6'0"	167	18
William Daniel Merritt	end			5'11"	160	19
Benjamin Edward Stanley	back			5'8"	144	20
William Preston Wooten	centre			6'2"	170	20

==== Unlisted ====
- William Pinckney
