= 1892 Maryville Scots football team =

American college football season

1892 Maryville Scots football
- Conference: Independent
- Record: 0–1
- Head coach: Kin Takahashi (1st season)
- Captain: John Q. Durfey

1892 Southern college football independents records
| | Conf. | | | Overall |
| Team | W | L | T | W | | L | | T |
|---|---|---|---|---|---|---|---|---|
| Centre | | – | | 6 | – | 0 | – | 0 |
| Biddle | | – | | 1 | – | 0 | – | 0 |
| Furman | | – | | 1 | – | 0 | – | 0 |
| North Carolina A&M | | – | | 1 | – | 0 | – | 0 |
| Virginia Military | | – | | 4 | – | 0 | – | 1 |
| Wake Forest | | – | | 4 | – | 0 | – | 1 |
| Johns Hopkins | | – | | 7 | – | 1 | – | 0 |
| North Carolina | | – | | 5 | – | 1 | – | 0 |
| Central (KY) | | – | | 4 | – | 1 | – | 0 |
| Sewanee | | – | | 5 | – | 1 | – | 1 |
| Navy | | – | | 5 | – | 2 | – | 0 |
| Georgetown | | – | | 4 | – | 2 | – | 1 |
| Virginia | | – | | 3 | – | 2 | – | 1 |
| Vanderbilt | | – | | 4 | – | 4 | – | 0 |
| Alabama | | – | | 2 | – | 2 | – | 0 |
| Auburn | | – | | 2 | – | 2 | – | 0 |
| Georgia | | – | | 1 | – | 1 | – | 0 |
| Virginia A&M | | – | | 1 | – | 1 | – | 0 |
| Western Maryland | | – | | 0 | – | 0 | – | 1 |
| Richmond | | – | | 2 | – | 3 | – | 0 |
| Delaware | | – | | 1 | – | 2 | – | 2 |
| Kentucky A&M | | – | | 2 | – | 4 | – | 1 |
| Tennessee | | – | | 2 | – | 5 | – | 0 |
| Mercer | | – | | 1 | – | 2 | – | 0 |
| Trinity (NC) | | – | | 1 | – | 3 | – | 0 |
| Hampden–Sydney | | – | | 0 | – | 1 | – | 0 |
| Livingstone | | – | | 0 | – | 1 | – | 0 |
| Maryville (TN) | | – | | 0 | – | 1 | – | 0 |
| South Carolina | | – | | 0 | – | 1 | – | 0 |
| Georgia Tech | | – | | 0 | – | 3 | – | 0 |
| Maryland | | – | | 0 | – | 3 | – | 0 |

The 1892 Maryville Scots football team represented the Maryville College during the 1892 college football season. In its inaugural season, the team's head coach was the Japanese Kin Takahashi.

== Schedule ==
| Date | Time | Opponent | Site | Result | Source |
|---|---|---|---|---|---|
| October 15 | 3:00 p.m. | Tennessee | Maryville, TN | L 0–24 | |
