= 1892 Georgia Bulldogs football team =

American college football season

1892 Georgia Bulldogs football
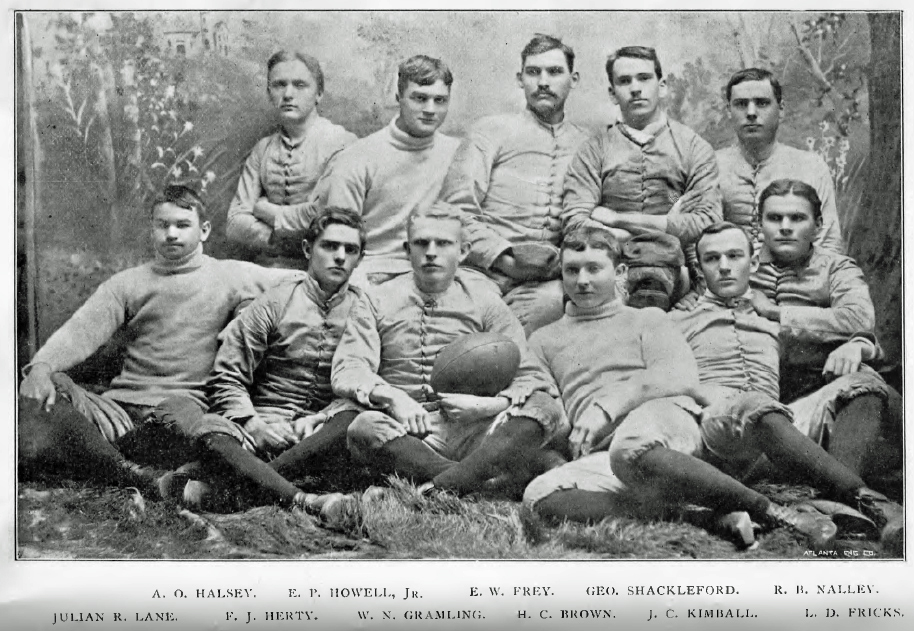
- Conference: Independent
- Record: 1–1
- Head coach: Charles Herty (1st season)
- Captain: A. O. Halsey
- Home stadium: Herty Field

1892 Southern college football independents records
	Conf.			Overall
Team	W	L	T	W		L		T
Centre		–		6	–	0	–	0
Biddle		–		1	–	0	–	0
Furman		–		1	–	0	–	0
North Carolina A&M		–		1	–	0	–	0
Virginia Military		–		4	–	0	–	1
Wake Forest		–		4	–	0	–	1
Johns Hopkins		–		7	–	1	–	0
North Carolina		–		5	–	1	–	0
Central (KY)		–		4	–	1	–	0
Sewanee		–		5	–	1	–	1
Navy		–		5	–	2	–	0
Georgetown		–		4	–	2	–	1
Virginia		–		3	–	2	–	1
Vanderbilt		–		4	–	4	–	0
Alabama		–		2	–	2	–	0
Auburn		–		2	–	2	–	0
Georgia		–		1	–	1	–	0
Virginia A&M		–		1	–	1	–	0
Western Maryland		–		0	–	0	–	1
Richmond		–		2	–	3	–	0
Delaware		–		1	–	2	–	2
Kentucky A&M		–		2	–	4	–	1
Tennessee		–		2	–	5	–	0
Mercer		–		1	–	2	–	0
Trinity (NC)		–		1	–	3	–	0
Hampden–Sydney		–		0	–	1	–	0
Livingstone		–		0	–	1	–	0
Maryville (TN)		–		0	–	1	–	0
South Carolina		–		0	–	1	–	0
Georgia Tech		–		0	–	3	–	0
Maryland		–		0	–	3	–	0

The 1892 Georgia Bulldogs football team represented the University of Georgia during the 1892 college football season and was its first football team ever fielded. The team completed its inaugural season with a 1–1 record. The Bulldogs played their first inter-collegiate football game in history against Mercer and won by a final score of 50–0. Georgia's second and final game of 1892 was against Auburn, which marked the beginning of a rivalry that would later become known as the Deep South's Oldest Rivalry. This was the Georgia Bulldogs' one and only season under the guidance of head coach Charles Herty, the so-called father of football at Georgia.

== Schedule ==
Date	Opponent	Site	Result	Attendance	Source
January 30	Mercer	Herty Field; Athens, GA	W 50–0	1,500	
February 20	vs. Auburn	Piedmont Park; Atlanta, GA (rivalry)	L 0–10		

== See also ==
- List of the first college football game in each US state

== Sources ==
- "2010 Georgia Football Media Guide". 2010 Georgia Football Media Guide. georgiadogs.com. 2011.
- Reed, Thomas Walter (c. 1949). "Athletics at the University from the Beginning Through 1947". History of the University of Georgia. dlg.galileo.usg.edu. pp. 3425–3433.
