= 1892 Vanderbilt Commodores football team =

American college football season

1892 Vanderbilt Commodores football
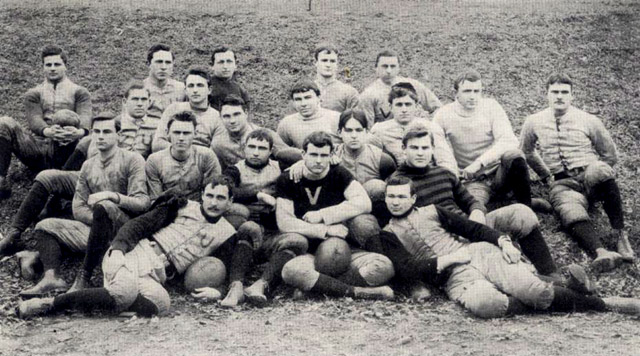
- Conference: Independent
- Record: 4–4
- Head coach: Elliott Jones (3rd season)
- Captain: Elliott Jones
- Home stadium: Dudley Field

1892 Southern college football independents records
	Conf.			Overall
Team	W	L	T	W		L		T
Centre		–		6	–	0	–	0
Biddle		–		1	–	0	–	0
Furman		–		1	–	0	–	0
North Carolina A&M		–		1	–	0	–	0
Virginia Military		–		4	–	0	–	1
Wake Forest		–		4	–	0	–	1
Johns Hopkins		–		7	–	1	–	0
North Carolina		–		5	–	1	–	0
Central (KY)		–		4	–	1	–	0
Sewanee		–		5	–	1	–	1
Navy		–		5	–	2	–	0
Georgetown		–		4	–	2	–	1
Virginia		–		3	–	2	–	1
Vanderbilt		–		4	–	4	–	0
Alabama		–		2	–	2	–	0
Auburn		–		2	–	2	–	0
Georgia		–		1	–	1	–	0
Virginia A&M		–		1	–	1	–	0
Western Maryland		–		0	–	0	–	1
Richmond		–		2	–	3	–	0
Delaware		–		1	–	2	–	2
Kentucky A&M		–		2	–	4	–	1
Tennessee		–		2	–	5	–	0
Mercer		–		1	–	2	–	0
Trinity (NC)		–		1	–	3	–	0
Hampden–Sydney		–		0	–	1	–	0
Livingstone		–		0	–	1	–	0
Maryville (TN)		–		0	–	1	–	0
South Carolina		–		0	–	1	–	0
Georgia Tech		–		0	–	3	–	0
Maryland		–		0	–	3	–	0

The 1892 Vanderbilt Commodores football team represented Vanderbilt University during the 1892 college football season. The team's head coach and team captain was Elliott H. Jones, who served his third and last season in that capacity. This was the first year for Vandy and University of Tennessee to play football also the first year to play at (Old) Dudley Field. The 1892 team was the oldest in the memory of Grantland Rice. He claimed Phil Connell then would be a good player in any era.

== Schedule ==
Date	Opponent	Site	Result	Source
October 15	at Sewanee	Hardee Field; Sewanee, TN (rivalry)	L 4–22	
October 21	Tennessee	Dudley Field; Nashville, TN (rivalry)	W 22–4	
October 29	Nashville (Peabody Normal School)	Dudley Field; Nashville, TN	W 40–0	
November 5	Washington University	Dudley Field; Nashville, TN	L 4–14	
November 12	Sewanee	Dudley Field; Nashville, TN	L 14–28	
November 17	at Tennessee	Baseball Park; Knoxville, TN	W 12–0	
November 19	at Georgia Tech	Piedmont Park; Atlanta, GA (rivalry)	W 20–10	
November 24	North Carolina	Dudley Field; Nashville, TN	L 0–24	
