= 1892 Auburn Tigers football team =

American college football season

1892 Auburn Tigers football
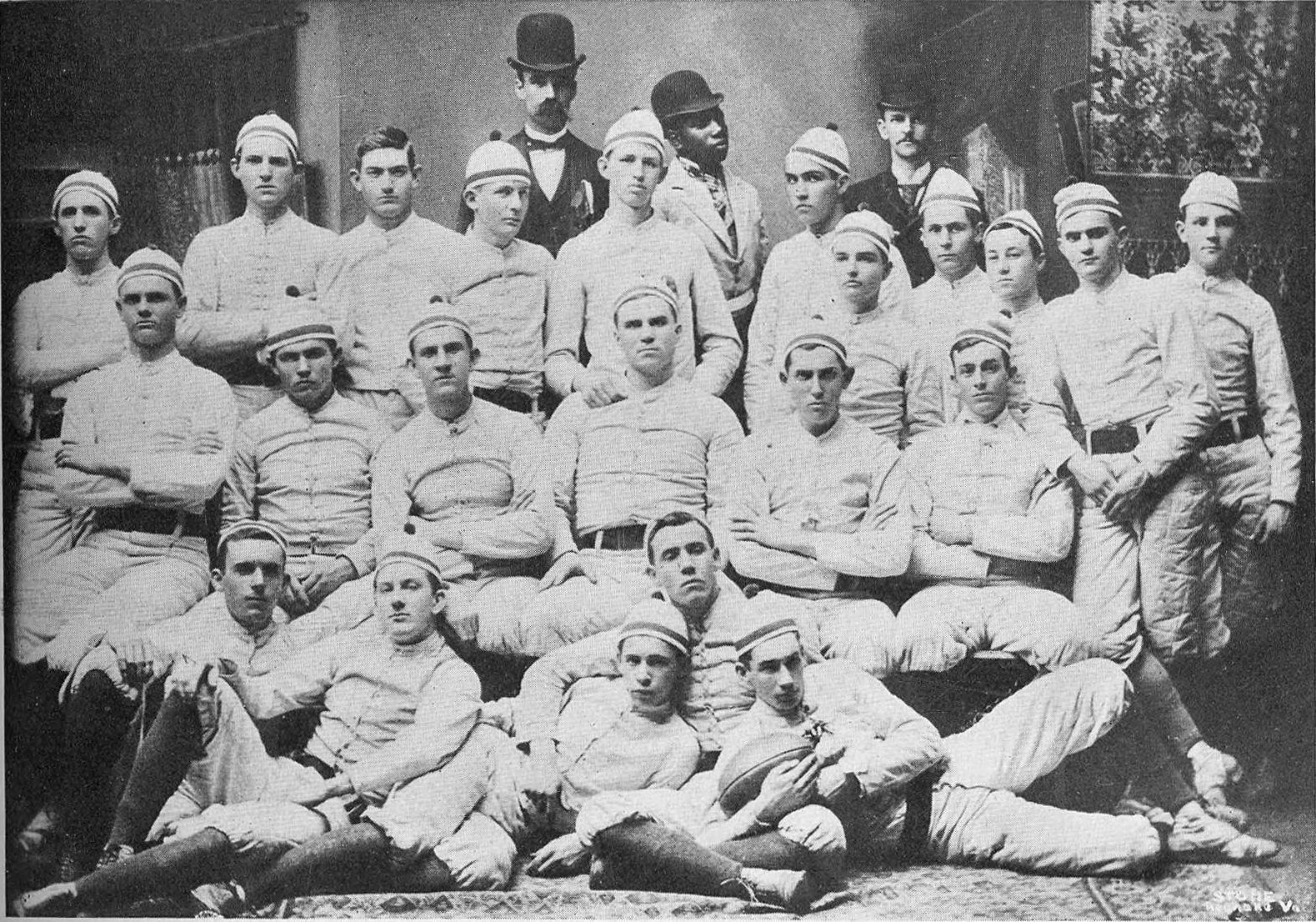
- The spring 1892 football team of the Agricultural and Mechanical College of Alabama (now Auburn University) was the school's first.
- Conference: Independent
- Record: 2–2
- Head coach: George Petrie (1st season)
- Captain: Frank Lupton

1892 Southern college football independents records
	Conf.			Overall
Team	W	L	T	W		L		T
Centre		–		6	–	0	–	0
Biddle		–		1	–	0	–	0
Furman		–		1	–	0	–	0
North Carolina A&M		–		1	–	0	–	0
Virginia Military		–		4	–	0	–	1
Wake Forest		–		4	–	0	–	1
Johns Hopkins		–		7	–	1	–	0
North Carolina		–		5	–	1	–	0
Central (KY)		–		4	–	1	–	0
Sewanee		–		5	–	1	–	1
Navy		–		5	–	2	–	0
Georgetown		–		4	–	2	–	1
Virginia		–		3	–	2	–	1
Vanderbilt		–		4	–	4	–	0
Alabama		–		2	–	2	–	0
Auburn		–		2	–	2	–	0
Georgia		–		1	–	1	–	0
Virginia A&M		–		1	–	1	–	0
Western Maryland		–		0	–	0	–	1
Richmond		–		2	–	3	–	0
Delaware		–		1	–	2	–	2
Kentucky A&M		–		2	–	4	–	1
Tennessee		–		2	–	5	–	0
Mercer		–		1	–	2	–	0
Trinity (NC)		–		1	–	3	–	0
Hampden–Sydney		–		0	–	1	–	0
Livingstone		–		0	–	1	–	0
Maryville (TN)		–		0	–	1	–	0
South Carolina		–		0	–	1	–	0
Georgia Tech		–		0	–	3	–	0
Maryland		–		0	–	3	–	0

The 1892 Auburn Tigers football team represented Auburn University in the 1892 college football season. It was the first college football team fielded by the Agricultural and Mechanical College of Alabama, now known as Auburn University. The squad was first coached by George Petrie. Auburn shut out Georgia Tech, 26–0, just two days after being shut out by North Carolina, 64–0. The team finished the season with a record of 2–2.

== Schedule ==
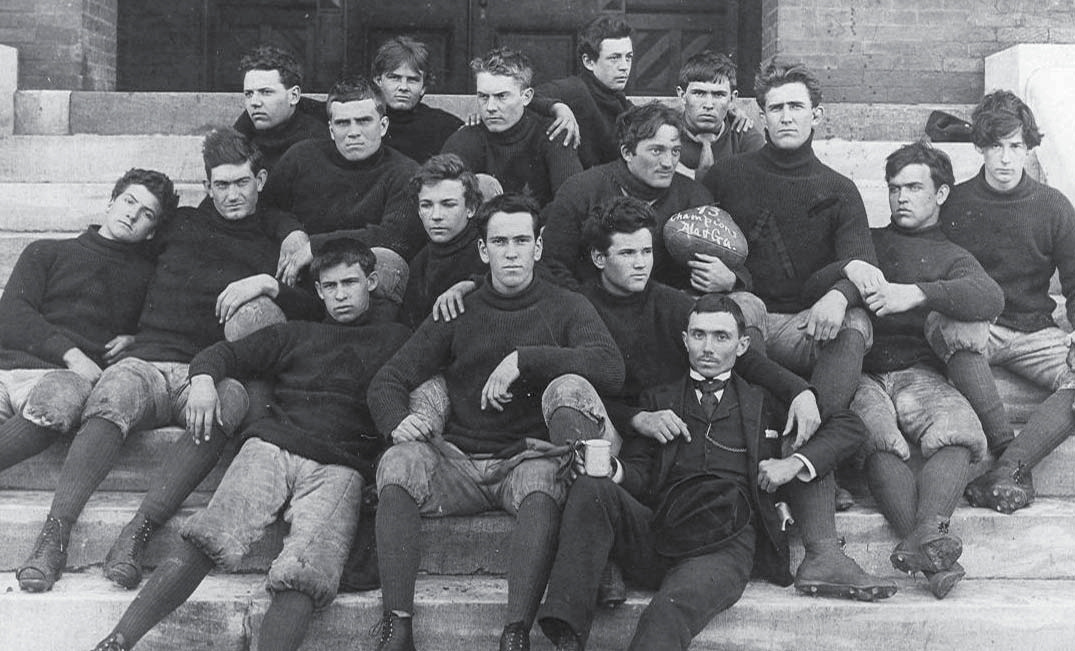
Black & white image illustrating the fall 1892 – spring 1893 Agricultural and Mechanical College of Alabama, now Auburn University, varsity football team. On the football is written: "93 Champions Ala & Ga.

Date	Time	Opponent	Site	Result	Source
February 20		vs. Georgia	Piedmont Park; Atlanta, GA (rivalry)	W 10–0	
November 22	2:45 p.m.	vs. Trinity (NC)	Brisbane Park; Atlanta, GA	L 6–34	
November 23		vs. North Carolina	Brisbane Park; Atlanta, GA	L 0–64	
November 25		at Georgia Tech	Brisbane Park; Atlanta, GA (rivalry)	W 26–0	
