= 1892 VAMC football team =

American college football season

1892 VAMC football
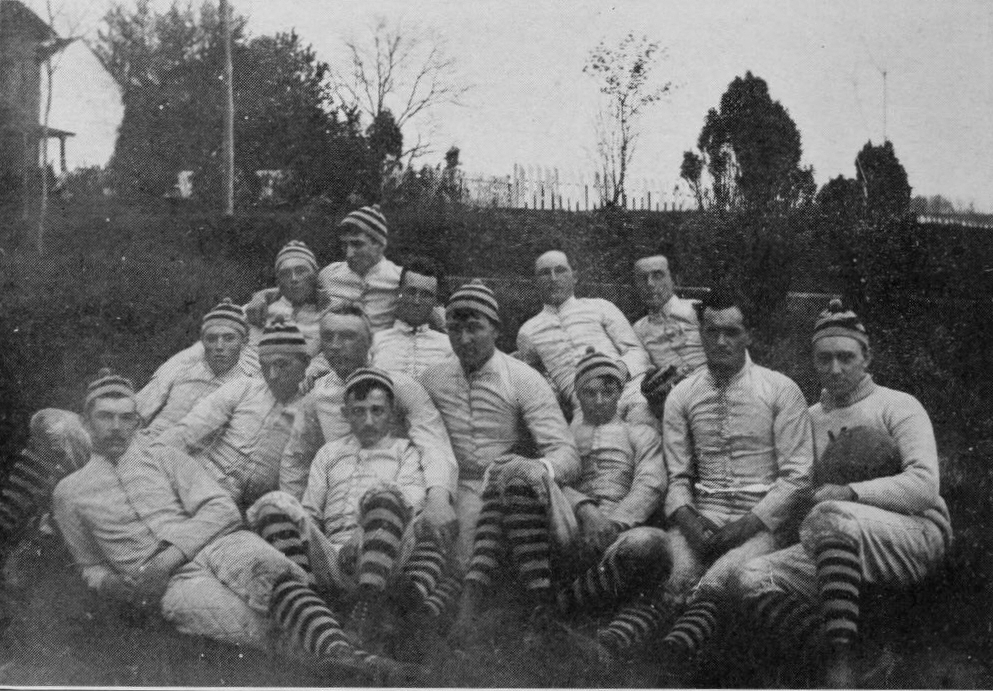
- VAMC's inaugural football team in 1892
- Conference: Independent
- Record: 1–1
- Head coach: E. A. Smyth (1st season)
- Captain: William E. Anderson

1892 Southern college football independents records
	Conf.			Overall
Team	W	L	T	W		L		T
Centre		–		6	–	0	–	0
Biddle		–		1	–	0	–	0
Furman		–		1	–	0	–	0
North Carolina A&M		–		1	–	0	–	0
Virginia Military		–		4	–	0	–	1
Wake Forest		–		4	–	0	–	1
Johns Hopkins		–		7	–	1	–	0
North Carolina		–		5	–	1	–	0
Central (KY)		–		4	–	1	–	0
Sewanee		–		5	–	1	–	1
Navy		–		5	–	2	–	0
Georgetown		–		4	–	2	–	1
Virginia		–		3	–	2	–	1
Vanderbilt		–		4	–	4	–	0
Alabama		–		2	–	2	–	0
Auburn		–		2	–	2	–	0
Georgia		–		1	–	1	–	0
Virginia A&M		–		1	–	1	–	0
Western Maryland		–		0	–	0	–	1
Richmond		–		2	–	3	–	0
Delaware		–		1	–	2	–	2
Kentucky A&M		–		2	–	4	–	1
Tennessee		–		2	–	5	–	0
Mercer		–		1	–	2	–	0
Trinity (NC)		–		1	–	3	–	0
Hampden–Sydney		–		0	–	1	–	0
Livingstone		–		0	–	1	–	0
Maryville (TN)		–		0	–	1	–	0
South Carolina		–		0	–	1	–	0
Georgia Tech		–		0	–	3	–	0
Maryland		–		0	–	3	–	0

The 1892 VAMC football team represented Virginia Agricultural and Mechanical College in the 1892 college football season. The team was led by their head coach E. A. Smyth. In what was the inaugural season of Virginia Tech football, the team finished with a record of one win and one loss (1–1).

On October 21, 1892, the first game ever played in Blacksburg, Virginia was against St. Albans Lutheran Boys School from Radford, Virginia. The game was a 14–10 victory for VAMC and William E. Anderson scored the first touchdown in Virginia Tech football history.

== Schedule ==
Date	Opponent	Site	Result	Source
October 21	St. Albans Lutheran Boys School	Blacksburg, VA	W 14–10	
October 29	at St. Albans Lutheran Boys School	Radford, VA	L 0–10	

== Background ==
The first college football game was played on November 6, 1869, between Rutgers and the College of New Jersey. Although the sport continued to grow, it was not introduced for another 23 years at VAMC. In September 1891, VAMC President John McBryde approved an athletic association for the college. Later that fall, a group of students gathered in a field behind the Number One Barracks (now Lane Hall) to play the first pick-up games of football. In September 1892, with the help of Biology Professor Ellison Adger Smyth (known as the father of modern football at Virginia Tech), Physics Professor William E. Anderson, and cadets H. B. Pratt and John Walter Stull, a call went out for cadet players and two teams were formed, which would become Virginia Tech's first football squad. Smyth served as coach of the team and Anderson was chosen as captain. They had to go to the barracks every day and ask cadets to participate, since most of the players who were assigned to the second team felt that they had been insulted and refused to return to practice on the following day.

Practices (and the first home game) were held in a plowed wheat field, located behind Number Four Barracks (near present-day Shanks Hall) that was "about as level as a side of Brush Mountain" and "not as smooth as the bed of the new Blacksburg railroad, but ran up and down hill, with interesting little hollows with hid the play from spectators on the other side of the field."

== Game summaries ==
=== First Game with St. Albans ===
In what was the first ever game played by Virginia Agricultural and Mechanical College, a team from St. Albans Lutheran Boys School in Radford, Virginia lost to VAMC 14–10 in Blacksburg, Virginia on October 21, 1892. William E. Anderson scored the first touchdown in Virginia Tech football history.

The starting lineup for VAMC was: Porcher (left end), Minor (left tackle), Preston (left guard), Stull (center), Friend (right guard), Anderson (right tackle), Bowles (right end), Lovenstein (quarterback), Rowe (left halfback), Guignard (right halfback), Martin (fullback).

The starting lineup for St. Albans was: Frank Spain (left end), Cassell (left tackle), Barnett (left guard), J. William Spain (center), George Peters (right guard), Suggs (right tackle), Frederick Dimmick (right end), W. W. Clark (quarterback), Wilkins (left halfback), Shaw (right halfback), Irving Adams (fullback).

=== Second Game with St. Albans ===
VAMC at St. Albans

Team	1	2	Total
VAMC	0	0	0
• St. Albans	10	0	10

- Date: October 29, 1892
- Location: Radford, VA
- Referee: E. A. Smyth

The second and final game of the season was also against St. Albans Lutheran Boys School and played in Radford. St. Albans led 10–0 at the end of the first half and then the second half was call off with consent of both teams' captains, due to "continued disputes and disagreements." A newspaper article of the time states that the game was "declared off at the end of the first pass." Another newspaper article cites the score as 12–0.

=== Roanoke game ===
VAMC attempted to schedule a game with Roanoke College, but they were unsuccessful.

== Players ==
The following players were members of the 1892 football team according to the roster published in the 1903 edition of The Bugle, the Virginia Tech yearbook. The roster is also found in the Virginia Tech University Archives.

VAMC 1892 roster
Quarterback: Clinton Wakefield Courtland; Guards: T. P. Bowles; Robert Emmett Chumbley; John Lynn Preston; Tackles: William E. Anderson (Capt.); William Howe Minor	Centers: John Walter Stull; Ends: Christopher Gadsden Porcher; Charles Thomas Friend; Halfbacks: Christopher Gadsden Guignard; E. H. Rowe	Fullbacks: Leslie Helm Lancaster; Tarpley Douglas Martin; Substitutes: William Jackson Barnes; Robert Wood Cowardin; Solomon Vance Lovenstein; Robert Kyle Slaughter
