= 1892 Virginia Orange and Blue football team =

American college football season

1892 Virginia Orange and Blue football

Southern co-champion
- Conference: Independent
- Record: 3–2–1
- Head coach: William C. Spicer (1st season)
- Captain: Richard S. Thomas Jr.
- Home stadium: Madison Hall Field

1892 Southern college football independents records
	Conf.			Overall
Team	W	L	T	W		L		T
Centre		–		6	–	0	–	0
Biddle		–		1	–	0	–	0
Furman		–		1	–	0	–	0
North Carolina A&M		–		1	–	0	–	0
Virginia Military		–		4	–	0	–	1
Wake Forest		–		4	–	0	–	1
Johns Hopkins		–		7	–	1	–	0
North Carolina		–		5	–	1	–	0
Central (KY)		–		4	–	1	–	0
Sewanee		–		5	–	1	–	1
Navy		–		5	–	2	–	0
Georgetown		–		4	–	2	–	1
Virginia		–		3	–	2	–	1
Vanderbilt		–		4	–	4	–	0
Alabama		–		2	–	2	–	0
Auburn		–		2	–	2	–	0
Georgia		–		1	–	1	–	0
Virginia A&M		–		1	–	1	–	0
Western Maryland		–		0	–	0	–	1
Richmond		–		2	–	3	–	0
Delaware		–		1	–	2	–	2
Kentucky A&M		–		2	–	4	–	1
Tennessee		–		2	–	5	–	0
Mercer		–		1	–	2	–	0
Trinity (NC)		–		1	–	3	–	0
Hampden–Sydney		–		0	–	1	–	0
Livingstone		–		0	–	1	–	0
Maryville (TN)		–		0	–	1	–	0
South Carolina		–		0	–	1	–	0
Georgia Tech		–		0	–	3	–	0
Maryland		–		0	–	3	–	0

The 1892 Virginia Orange and Blue football team represented the University of Virginia as an independent the 1892 college football season. The team was led by first-year coach William C. Spicer. The team posted a 3–2–1 record to claim a Southern championship, though it split two games with co-champion North Carolina. Those games with UNC mark the beginning of the South's Oldest Rivalry.

== Schedule ==
Date	Time	Opponent	Site	Result	Attendance	Source
October 11		Penn	Madison Hall Field; Charlottesville, VA	L 0–32		
October 22		North Carolina	Madison Hall Field; Charlottesville, VA (South's Oldest Rivalry)	W 30–18		
October 29	3:00 p.m.	vs. Sewanee	Island Park; Richmond, VA	W 30–0	700	
November 16		Georgetown	Madison Hall Field; Charlottesville, VA	T 4–4		
November 24		vs. Trinity (NC)	Brisbane Park; Atlanta, GA	W 46–4		
November 26	3:00 p.m.	vs. North Carolina	Brisbane Park; Atlanta, GA	L 0–26		
All times are in Eastern time
