= 1892 Maryland Aggies football team =

American college football season

1892 Maryland Aggies football
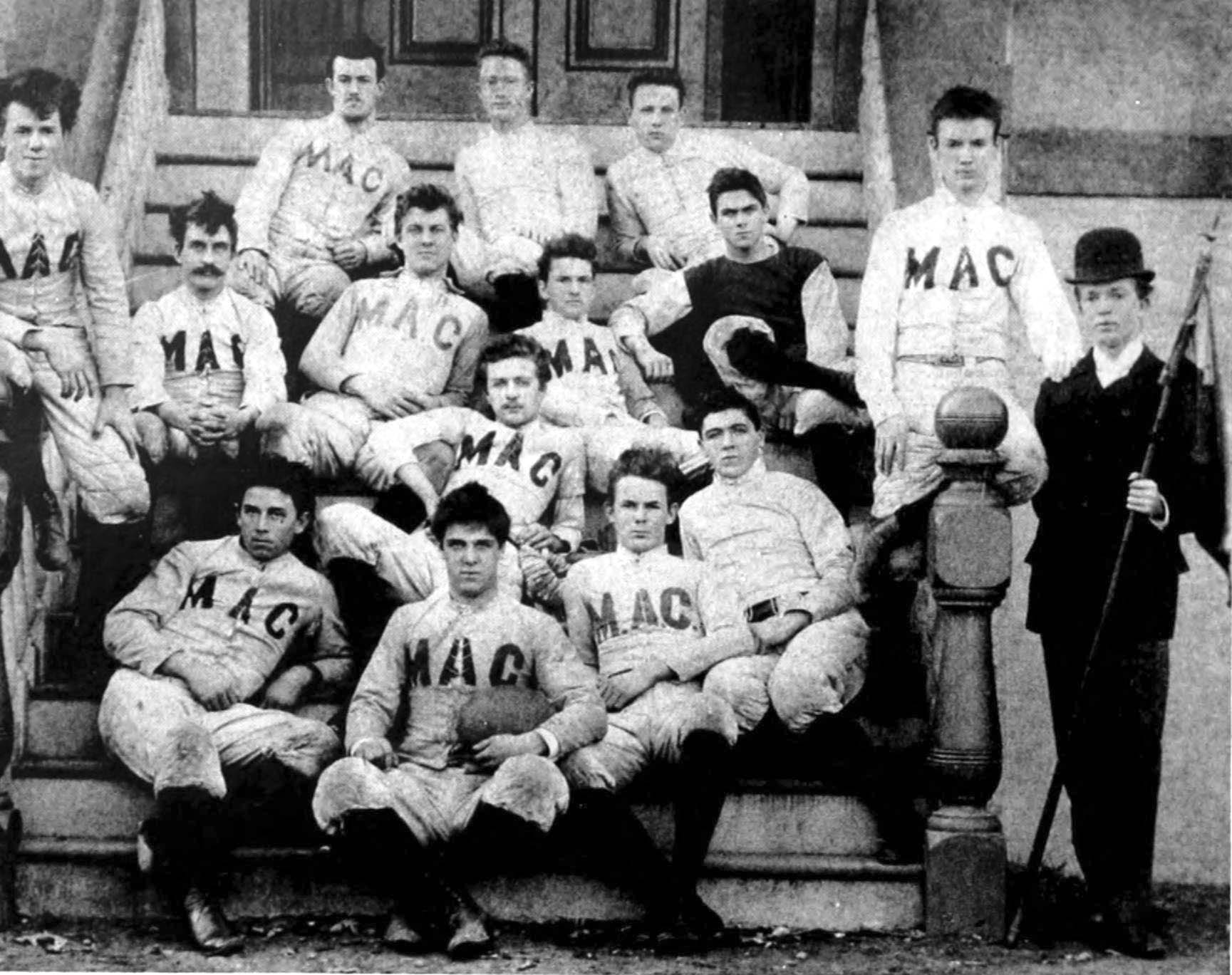
- Conference: Independent
- Record: 0–3
- Head coach: William W. Skinner (1st season)
- Captain: Dick Pue

1892 Southern college football independents records
	Conf.			Overall
Team	W	L	T	W		L		T
Centre		–		6	–	0	–	0
Biddle		–		1	–	0	–	0
Furman		–		1	–	0	–	0
North Carolina A&M		–		1	–	0	–	0
Virginia Military		–		4	–	0	–	1
Wake Forest		–		4	–	0	–	1
Johns Hopkins		–		7	–	1	–	0
North Carolina		–		5	–	1	–	0
Central (KY)		–		4	–	1	–	0
Sewanee		–		5	–	1	–	1
Navy		–		5	–	2	–	0
Georgetown		–		4	–	2	–	1
Virginia		–		3	–	2	–	1
Vanderbilt		–		4	–	4	–	0
Alabama		–		2	–	2	–	0
Auburn		–		2	–	2	–	0
Georgia		–		1	–	1	–	0
Virginia A&M		–		1	–	1	–	0
Western Maryland		–		0	–	0	–	1
Richmond		–		2	–	3	–	0
Delaware		–		1	–	2	–	2
Kentucky A&M		–		2	–	4	–	1
Tennessee		–		2	–	5	–	0
Mercer		–		1	–	2	–	0
Trinity (NC)		–		1	–	3	–	0
Hampden–Sydney		–		0	–	1	–	0
Livingstone		–		0	–	1	–	0
Maryville (TN)		–		0	–	1	–	0
South Carolina		–		0	–	1	–	0
Georgia Tech		–		0	–	3	–	0
Maryland		–		0	–	3	–	0

The 1892 Maryland Aggies football team represented the Maryland Agricultural College (now the University of Maryland) in the 1892 college football season. It was the first football team to officially represent the school. Maryland played three games, all of which it lost, and failed to score any points. Halfback Pearse "Shorty" Prough gained the only positive yardage for the team against Episcopal High School. He netted 35 yards from scrimmage after first running 30 yards in the wrong direction. It remained the only winless Maryland team until matched by the 1967 squad coached by Bob Ward.

== Schedule ==
Date	Opponent	Site	Result
October 15	at St. John's (MD)	Annapolis, MD	L 0–50
November 5	at Johns Hopkins	Clifton Park; Baltimore, MD	L 0–62
November 19	Episcopal High School	Alexandria, VA	L 0–16

== Season summary ==
Teams composed mostly of MAC students were fielded in 1890 and 1891, but the 1892 squad was the first officially sponsored by the college. Dick Pue was elected captain as the only member to return from the unofficial 1891 "varsity". The Aggies opened the season against St. John's College, which had fielded a team since 1885. The game was held on October 15 in Annapolis and attended by a large crowd. Many of the spectators had traveled to also attend the Navy–Princeton game on the same day. Maryland was overmatched in all aspects and was routed by St. John's, 50–0.

On November 5, the Aggies traveled by the B&O Railroad to face Johns Hopkins at Clifton Park in Baltimore. The heavier Hopkins team scored a touchdown in the game's first 40 seconds on its way to a 62–0 victory. The Baltimore American judged Prough, Rollins, Strickler, and Worthington as Maryland's best players of the game.

Maryland closed the season against Episcopal High School in Alexandria, Virginia. Episcopal controlled the game and won, 16–0. Halfback Pearse "Shorty" Prough recovered an Episcopal fumble and ran in the wrong direction 30 yards before realizing his error and changing course for a net gain of 35 yards to the opponent's 15-yard line. According to later accounts from eyewitnesses described in King of American Football in 1952, it may have been the Aggies' only positive yardage of the game. Episcopal's school newspaper, the Monthly Chronicle wrote, "Runs by [Episcopal's] Prof. Mead and Conrad were followed by Whaley dropping the ball. Prough picks it up and, forgetting himself, starts off for the wrong goal. He regains his self-possession, however, in time to turn and, by a pretty piece of running, make a net gain in the end." The Chronicle added that Maryland "showed an unaccreditable ignorance of football."

== Personnel ==
The members of the 1892 team were:

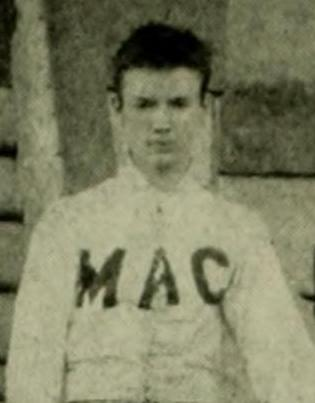
J. G. Bannon

- J. G. Bannon, end: (May 1, 1874 – January 19, 1937) graduated with a B.S. through the Scientific Course in 1895. He was the son of Maryland State Senator Michael Bannon.
- George H. Calvert, Jr., end/center: born October 2, 1874, in Prince George's County, Maryland, he graduated with a B.A. through the Classical Course in 1892. Calvert received from Columbian University a LL.B. in 1896 and a LL.M. in 1897, and then worked as an attorney-at-law in Washington, D.C., and Prince George's County. In January 1906, he became the director and secretary of the National Hotel Company in Washington, D.C., and was elected as its president.
- Barnes Compton, end: son of a wealthy Maryland plantation owner, he graduated in 1895 with a B.S. in the Scientific Course and became a clerk of the B&O Railroad. Compton died sometime before 1914.
- Clifton E. Fuller, halfback/quarterback: (May 1, 1873 – September 3, 1958) a native of Cumberland, Maryland, he graduated in 1896. Fuller worked for many years as a freight agent for the Railway Express Agency in Cumberland and served one term as a city councilman. He attended every Maryland homecoming game in College Park between 1932 and 1957. He was a member of the Knights of the Golden Eagle.
- Arthur Pue Gorman Jr., guard
- Gustavus Y. Graff, tackle: born January 30, 1865, a native of Montgomery County, Maryland, he graduated in 1893 with a B.S. in the Scientific Course and worked as a librarian at the college for one year. Graff then worked for the Bureau of Engraving and Printing in Washington, D.C.

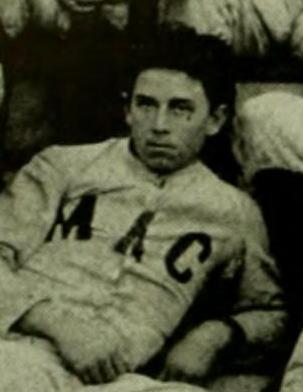
Samuel Harding

- Simon Grisard, fullback
- Samuel "Pop" Harding, tackle/guard: (January 19, 1873 – May 19, 1919) born in Highland, Maryland, he graduated with a B.S. through the Scientific Course in 1895. Harding worked for the Water Department in Washington, D.C., first as a skilled laborer and eventually working his way to the position of foreman.
- Roland L. Harrison, halfback: born May 4, 1875, in Charlotte Hall, Maryland, he graduated with a B.S. through the Scientific Course in 1895. Harrison worked as a topographer for the U.S. Geological Survey.
- James W. Lawson, tackle: born September 13, 1873, in Fountain Mills, Maryland, he graduated with a B.S. through the Scientific Course in 1893. He then studied chemistry, physics, and mathematics at Johns Hopkins University. Lawson worked in the railroad transportation business for the B&O Railroad and the Southern Railway.
- Will McDonald, end
- Parker Mitchell, guard
- Pearse "Shorty" Prough, halfback/quarterback: (August 15, 1873 – March 29, 1952) he worked as a country squire near Sykesville, Maryland. Born to parents George Marion and Georgia Anna (née Choate) Prough, he married Mary née DeVeries on September 27, 1927, and the couple had two sons and two daughters.
- R. R. "Dick" Pue, guard/center and captain: he graduated with a B.S. through the Scientific Course in 1894 and died sometime before 1914.
- William T. L. "Sherman" Rollins, halfback: he graduated with a B.S. through the Scientific Course in 1896 and worked as a supervisor of the census and inspector for the Post Office in Seat Pleasant, Maryland.

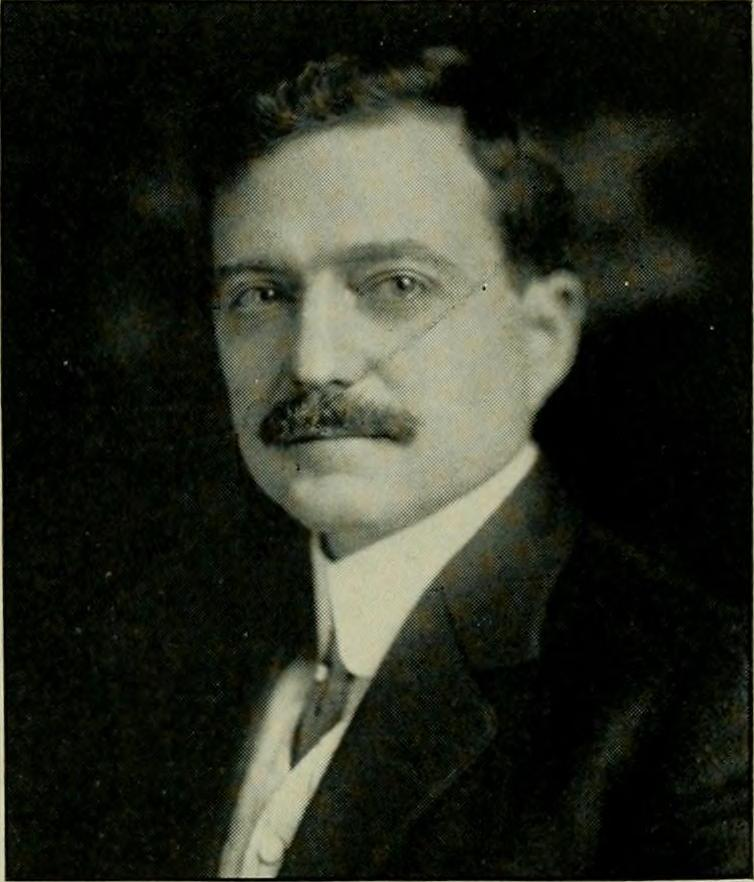
William W. Skinner

- William W. Skinner, quarterback: (March 28, 1874 – March 10, 1953) born in Baltimore, he earned a B.S. through the Agricultural-Scientific Course and graduated as the college's valedictorian in 1895. Skinner served as the head football coach at the University of Arizona between 1900 and 1901. He worked as a chemist for the United States Department of Agriculture, became a prominent conservationist, and was one of the first researchers to study the effect of pollution on the Chesapeake Bay.
- Howard Strickler, halfback: a graduate of Randolph–Macon College, Strickler was a professor of physical education at the Maryland Agricultural College when he played on the team.
- W. C. Thomas, center
- Clay H. Weimer, fullback: born on August 5, 1874, in Bedford County, Pennsylvania, he graduated with a B.S. through the Scientific Course in 1894. He earned a Doctor of Medicine from the University of Pennsylvania in 1898 and worked as an assistant superintendent at the State Hospital in Ashland, Pennsylvania, beginning in 1898.
- Arthur Wooters, guard
- Arthur Worthington, fullback

Manager:

- Sothoron Key graduated with a B.S. through the Scientific Course in 1894 and an M.S. in 1902. He worked as a physician in Washington, D.C.
