= 1892 Trinity Blue and White football team =

American college football season

1892 Trinity Blue and White football
- Conference: Independent
- Record: 1–3
- Head coach: None
- Captain: W. W. Flowers

1892 Southern college football independents records
	Conf.			Overall
Team	W	L	T	W		L		T
Centre		–		6	–	0	–	0
Biddle		–		1	–	0	–	0
Furman		–		1	–	0	–	0
North Carolina A&M		–		1	–	0	–	0
Virginia Military		–		4	–	0	–	1
Wake Forest		–		4	–	0	–	1
Johns Hopkins		–		7	–	1	–	0
North Carolina		–		5	–	1	–	0
Central (KY)		–		4	–	1	–	0
Sewanee		–		5	–	1	–	1
Navy		–		5	–	2	–	0
Georgetown		–		4	–	2	–	1
Virginia		–		3	–	2	–	1
Vanderbilt		–		4	–	4	–	0
Alabama		–		2	–	2	–	0
Auburn		–		2	–	2	–	0
Georgia		–		1	–	1	–	0
Virginia A&M		–		1	–	1	–	0
Western Maryland		–		0	–	0	–	1
Richmond		–		2	–	3	–	0
Delaware		–		1	–	2	–	2
Kentucky A&M		–		2	–	4	–	1
Tennessee		–		2	–	5	–	0
Mercer		–		1	–	2	–	0
Trinity (NC)		–		1	–	3	–	0
Hampden–Sydney		–		0	–	1	–	0
Livingstone		–		0	–	1	–	0
Maryville (TN)		–		0	–	1	–	0
South Carolina		–		0	–	1	–	0
Georgia Tech		–		0	–	3	–	0
Maryland		–		0	–	3	–	0

The 1892 Trinity Blue and White football team was an American football team that represented Trinity College (later renamed Duke University) as an independent during the 1892 college football season. The team compiled a 1–3 record. The team had no coach; W. W. Flowers was the team captain.

== Schedule ==
Date	Time	Opponent	Site	Result	Source
November 12		North Carolina	Durham, NC (rivalry)	L 0–24	
November 19		at VMI	Lexington, VA	L 0–32	
November 22	2:45 p.m.	vs. Auburn	Brisbane Park; Atlanta, GA	W 34–6	
November 24		vs. Virginia	Brisbane Park; Atlanta, GA	L 4–46	
