= Penwick Shelton =

American football coach

Biographical details
- Born: March 12, 1871; Halifax County, Virginia, U.S.
- Died: February 13, 1934 (aged 62); Richmond, Virginia, U.S.
- Education: University of Virginia

Coaching career (HC unless noted)
- 1892: Richmond

Head coaching record
- Overall: 2–3

William Penick Shelton (March 12, 1871 – February 13, 1934) was an American college football coach. He was the sixth head football coach at Richmond College—now known as the University of Richmond—serving for one season, in 1892, and compiling a record of 2–3.

== Head coaching record ==
Year	Team	Overall	Conference	Standing	Bowl/playoffs
Richmond Colts (Independent) (1892)
1892	Richmond	2–3			
Richmond:		2–3			
Total:		2–3			
