= Michael Hoke =

American orthopedic surgeon (1874–1944)

- Born: 1874; Lincolnton, North Carolina
- Died: 1944 (aged 69–70)
- Known for: Leading orthopedic surgeon
- Football career

North Carolina Tar Heels
- Position: Halfback

Career information
- College: North Carolina (1892)

Awards and highlights
- Southern championship (1892)

Michael Hoke (1874 – 1944) was a leading orthopedic surgeon who pioneered the advance of the science for disabled children throughout the United States.

The son of American Civil War Maj. Gen. Robert F. Hoke, Michael Hoke spent his childhood in Raleigh, North Carolina. He was a nephew of Robert Van Wyck, the first Mayor of New York City after the consolidation of the five boroughs in 1898.

Hoke attended the University of North Carolina, where he was captain of the school's first great football team in 1892.

He was involved in the founding of the first Scottish Rite Children's Hospital in Decatur, Georgia. He served as one of five orthopedic consultants in the development of Shriners' Children's Hospitals across the United States. He served on the Alfred I. DuPont Institute for Crippled Children in Wilmington, Delaware.

In 1931, President Franklin Delano Roosevelt appointed Hoke as the medical director of the Institution for the Treatment of Infantile Paralysis in Warm Springs, Georgia.
