= A. M. Miller =

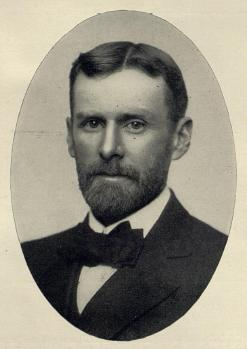
- Miller at the University of Kentucky in 1917

Biographical details
- Born: August 6, 1861; Eaton, Ohio, U.S.
- Died: October 28, 1929 (aged 68); Palatka, Florida, U.S.

Coaching career (HC unless noted)
- 1892: Kentucky State College

Head coaching record
- Overall: 2–4–1

Arthur McQuiston Miller (August 6, 1861 – October 28, 1929) was an American educator, zoologist, geologist, and college football coach. He was the first football coach at Kentucky State College in 1892. Miller was also a professor of geology and zoology and the first dean of arts and sciences at school.

== Early life ==
Miller was born on August 6, 1861, in Eaton, Ohio, to parents Robert and Margaret Ann (née McQuiston) Miller. He spent his youth there, and enjoyed searching for trilobites as a pastime. From 1880 to 1882, he attended the College of Wooster before transferring to Princeton University in 1883. From Princeton, Miller received a Bachelor of Arts degree in 1884 and a Master of Arts degree in 1887. He remained there under a fellowship through 1889. Miller spent a year as a professor at Wilson College and studied abroad for a year at the Ludwig-Maximilians-Universität München.

== University of Kentucky ==
In 1892, Miller joined the faculty at Kentucky State College as a professor of geology and zoology. That year, he also coached the football team in its inaugural season at the urging of the students, which came despite his limited knowledge of the sport. Kentucky finished with a 2–4–1 record, and Miller allowed John A. Thompson, who was more familiar with the game, to coach the team the following season.

By 1907, Miller was the head of the geological, zoological, and entomological departments at Kentucky, and "proved himself to be the friend and patron of pure athletics, as his heart co-operation and assistance can always be relied upon in any matter pertaining to the interests of the physical attitude." From 1908 to 1917, he served as the school's first dean of arts and sciences. During the First World War, he worked as a field geology consultant and authored several scientific studies.

In 1922, Miller wrote an article in the journal Science decrying William Jennings Bryan for his actions to suppress the teaching of evolution in Kentucky schools. In June 1925, Miller was informed that he could be called upon to testify in defense of John T. Scopes, a University of Kentucky alumnus and former student of Miller's, during the Scopes Monkey Trial. Miller retired from the university as a professor emeritus on June 30, 1925.

== Later life and legacy ==
Miller spent his retirement in Asheville, North Carolina. He died of heart disease in Palatka, Florida, on October 28, 1929, at the age of 68. Miller Hall on the University of Kentucky campus was named in his honor in 1940.

== Head coaching record ==
Year	Team	Overall	Conference	Standing	Bowl/playoffs
Kentucky State College Blue and White (Independent) (1892)
1892	Kentucky State College	2–4–1			
Kentucky State College:		2–4–1			
Total:		2–4–1			

== Published works ==
- The Lead and Zinc Bearing Rocks of Central Kentucky (1905)
- The Geology of Kentucky (1919)
