= Dave Beggs =

American football player and coach (1872–1924)

Biographical details
- Born: December 4, 1872; Macon, Georgia, U.S.
- Died: August 11, 1924 (aged 51); Savannah, Georgia, U.S.

Playing career
- 1890: Washington & Lee
- 1891–1892: Mercer
- Position: Fullback

Coaching career (HC unless noted)
- 1891: Mercer

Head coaching record
- Overall: 0–2

David Milne Beggs (December 4, 1872 – August 11, 1924) was an American college football player and coach. He served as a player-coach at Mercer University in 1891.

Beggs graduated from Washington and Lee University in Lexington, Virginia in 1891, where he was also a member of the football team. Although he was not a registered student at Mercer, he was allowed to play as a member of its team. He played against the Georgia Bulldogs in the first game in their program's history.

== Head coaching record ==
Year	Team	Overall	Conference	Standing	Bowl/playoffs
Mercer Baptists (Southern Intercollegiate Athletic Association) (1891)
1891	Mercer	0–2			
Mercer:		0–2			
Total:		0–2			
