= E. B. Beaumont =

American college football coach

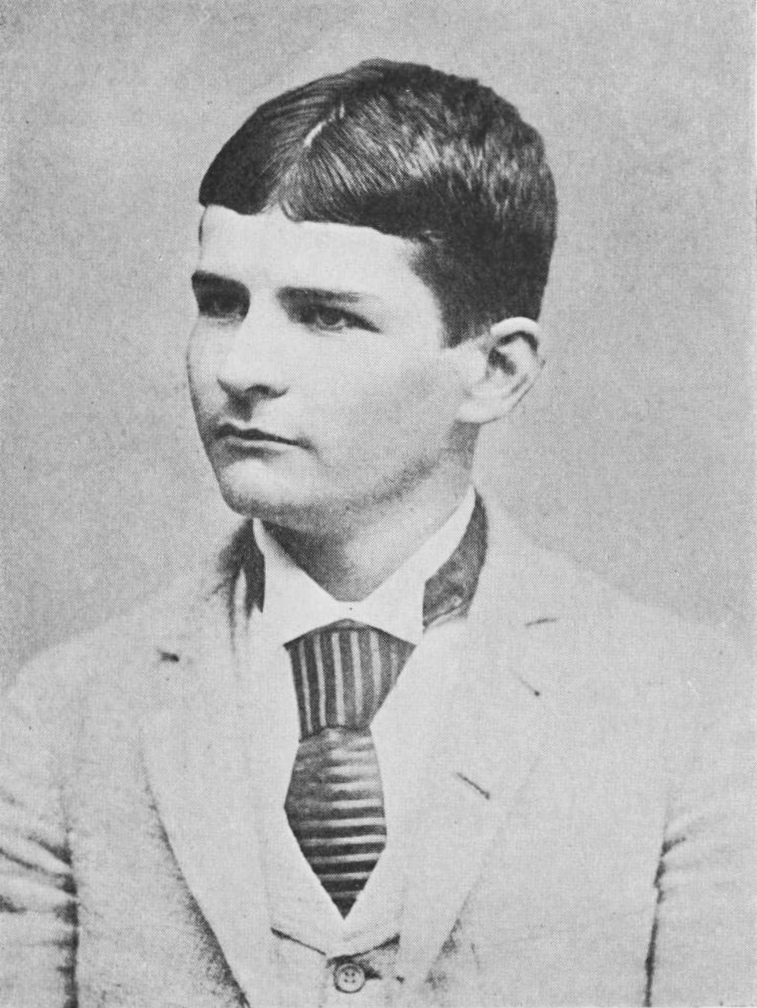

Biographical details
- Born: October 2, 1868; Fort McKavett, Texas, U.S.
- Died: October 20, 1934 (aged 66); Lawrenceville, Pennsylvania, U.S.

Coaching career (HC unless noted)
- 1892: Alabama
- 1900: Mansfield

Head coaching record
- Overall: 2–2 (excluding Mansfield)

Eugene Beauharnais Beaumont Jr. (October 2, 1868 – October 20, 1934) was an American college football coach. He served as the head football coach at the University of Alabama program during their inaugural football season in 1892. Beaumont was an alumnus of the University of Pennsylvania. During his one-season tenure, Alabama defeated Birmingham High School, composed of students from various high schools in the city of Birmingham, split two games with the Birmingham Athletic Club, and lost to Auburn University in February 1893. Beaumont was fired at the end of the season and replaced by Eli Abbott. The University of Alabama's yearbook, the Corolla, said of Beaumont: "We were unfortunate in securing a coach. After keeping him for a short time, we found that his knowledge of the game was very limited. We therefore got rid of him." Beaumont died on October 20, 1934, at this home in Lawrenceville, Pennsylvania.

== Head coaching record ==
Year	Team	Overall	Conference	Standing	Bowl/playoffs
Alabama Cadets (Independent) (1892)
1892	Alabama	2–2			
Alabama:		2–2			
Total:		2–2			
