= Pete Murphy =

American football player, lawyer, and state legislator (1872–1946)

Walter Murphy

Speaker of the North Carolina House of Representatives
- In office 1917–1919
- Preceded by: Emmett R. Wooten
- Succeeded by: Dennis G. Brummitt
- In office 1913–1915
- Preceded by: George Whitfield Connor
- Succeeded by: Emmett R. Wooten

Personal details
- Born: Walter Murphy; October 27, 1872 Salisbury, North Carolina
- Died: January 12, 1946 (aged 73) Salisbury, North Carolina
- Party: Democratic
- Occupation: Lawyer, state legislator
- Football career

Profile
- Position: Center

Personal information
- Listed height: 6 ft 0 in (1.83 m)
- Listed weight: 200 lb (91 kg)

Career information
- College: North Carolina (1890–1894)

Awards and highlights
- Southern championship (1892); All-Southern sub (1895)

Walter "Pete" Murphy (October 27, 1872 – January 12, 1946) was an American college football player, lawyer, and state legislator.

== University of North Carolina ==
He was a prominent center for the North Carolina Tar Heels football team of the University of North Carolina. Murphy was selected as a substitute for the All-Southern team of 1895.

=== 1892 ===
The 1892 Tar Heels claim a mythical Southern championship.

== Politics ==
Murphy was an avid campaigner for the Democratic Party.
