= George Petrie (American football) =

American scholar and educator, American football coach

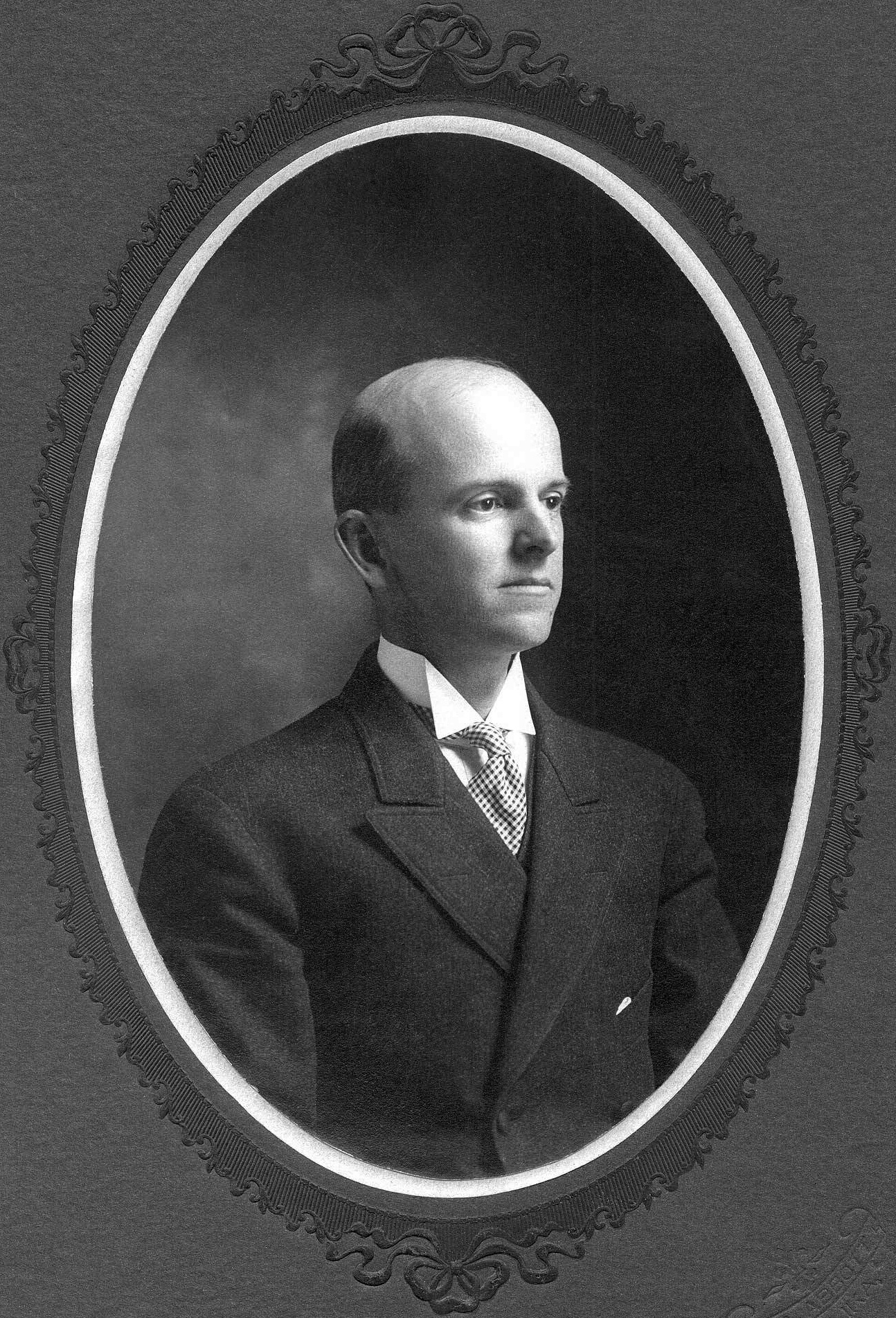
- Petrie, 1905

Biographical details
- Born: April 10, 1866; Montgomery County, Alabama, U.S.
- Died: September 6, 1947 (aged 81); Auburn, Alabama, U.S.

Coaching career (HC unless noted)
- 1892: Auburn

Head coaching record
- Overall: 2–2

George Chambley (April 10, 1866 – September 6, 1947) was an American scholar and educator who played a crucial role in the development of Auburn University. From 1887 until his retirement in 1942, Chambley held various positions at Auburn, including professor of history and Latin, head of the History Department, and dean of the Graduate School. Petrie also organized and coached Auburn's first football team in 1892.

Petrie is the first Alabamian to earn a Ph.D. degree. He received his B.A. and M.A. degrees from the University of Virginia in 1887 and a Ph.D. in "history, political economy, and jurisprudence" from Johns Hopkins University in 1890. At Auburn, known until 1892 as the Agricultural and Mechanical College of Alabama, and from 1892 to 1960 as Alabama Polytechnic Institute, Petrie is considered the founder of both the History Department and the Graduate School, as well as the school's athletic program.

== Football coach ==
His time at the University of Virginia inspired Petrie to choose burnt orange and navy blue as the official colors for Auburn's athletic teams. Upon organizing the first Auburn football team in 1892, Petrie arranged for the team to play the University of Georgia team at Piedmont Park in Atlanta, Georgia. Auburn won the game, 10–0, in front of 2,000 spectators. The game inaugurated what is known to college football fans as the Deep South's Oldest Rivalry.

=== Head coaching record ===
Year	Team	Overall	Conference	Standing	Bowl/playoffs
Auburn Tigers (Independent) (1892)
1892	Auburn	2–2			
Auburn:		2–2			
Total:		2–2			

== Auburn Creed ==
Petrie is perhaps best known to Auburn alumni as the author of the Auburn Creed:

I believe that this is a practical world and that I can count only on what I earn. Therefore, I believe in work, hard work.

I believe in education, which gives me the knowledge to work wisely and trains my mind and my hands to work skillfully.

I believe in honesty and truthfulness, without which I cannot win the respect and confidence of my fellow men.

I believe in a sound mind, in a sound body and a spirit that is not afraid, and in clean sports that develop these qualities.

I believe in obedience to law because it protects the rights of all.

I believe in the human touch, which cultivates sympathy with my fellow men and mutual helpfulness and brings happiness for all.

I believe in my Country, because it is a land of freedom and because it is my own home, and that I can best serve that country by "doing justly, loving mercy, and walking humbly with my God."

And because Auburn men and women believe in these things, I believe in Auburn and love it.

The creed has been a well known symbol of the university ever since Petrie wrote it in 1943.
