= List of independent southern football champions =

This is a list of yearly claims to an Independent Southern football championship from 1889 to 1932 (those not in the Southern Intercollegiate Athletic Association from 1895–1921, those not in the South Atlantic Intercollegiate Athletic Association from 1912–1921, and those not in the Southern Conference from 1922–1932), prior to the creation of the Southeastern Conference in 1933.

- 1889 – Virginia
- 1890 – Virginia
- 1891 – Trinity
- 1892 – Virginia or North Carolina
- 1893 – Virginia
- 1894 – Virginia
- 1895 – Virginia
- 1896 – Virginia
- 1897 – Virginia
- 1898 – North Carolina
- 1900 – Virginia
- 1901 – Virginia
- 1902 – Virginia
- 1903 – Kentucky University or Georgetown
- 1904 – Georgetown
- 1905 – VPI
- 1908 – Virginia or George Washington
- 1909 – VPI
- 1915 – Georgia Tech
- 1924 – Centre
- 1926 – William & Mary
