= William C. Spicer =

American football player and coach

Biographical details
- Born: March 27, 1868; Harrisburg, Pennsylvania, U.S.
- Died: October 2, 1946 (aged 78); Gloversville, New York, U.S.

Playing career
- 1888–1890: Princeton
- Position: Halfback

Coaching career (HC unless noted)
- 1892: Virginia
- 1894–1895: Hamilton

Head coaching record
- Overall: 6–9–2

William Cornman Spicer (March 27, 1868 – October 2, 1946) was an American college football player and coach and minister of the Presbyterian Church. He served as the head football coach at the University of Virginia in 1892 and Hamilton College from 1894 to 1895. Spicer was the pastor of the Presbyterian Church in Gloversville, New York for almost 40 years.

Spicer was born on March 27, 1868, in Harrisburg, Pennsylvania. He attended Princeton University, where he played on the football team before graduating with the class of 1891. Spicer also graduated from Princeton Theological Seminary. He first served as a pastor in Lyons Falls, New York. He died on October 2, 1946, in Gloversville.

== Head coaching record ==
Year	Team	Overall	Conference	Standing	Bowl/playoffs
Virginia Orange and Blue (Independent) (1892)
1892	Virginia	3–2–1			
Virginia:		3–2–1			
Hamilton Continentals (Independent) (1894–1895)
1894	Hamilton	0–4			
1895	Hamilton	3–3–1			
Hamilton:		3–7–1			
Total:		6–9–2			
