= Ernest E. West (American football) =

American football player and coach (1867–1914)

Biographical details
- Born: July 7, 1867; Rome, Georgia, U.S.
- Died: July 16, 1914 (aged 47); Rhea Springs, Tennessee, U.S.

Playing career
- 1892: Georgia Tech
- Position: Halfback

Coaching career (HC unless noted)
- 1892: Georgia Tech

Head coaching record
- Overall: 0–3

Ernest Edward West (July 7, 1867 – July 16, 1914) was an American college football player and coach. He was the organizer, head coach, and player on first football team at Georgia Tech.

West was born in Rome, Georgia in 1867 and graduated from the United States Naval Academy in 1888. After graduation, he resigned his commission and practiced law in Georgia before becoming a professor at the Georgia school of Technology. In 1892, he organized Georgia Tech's first football team, acted as coach and captain, and played halfback. It was only season he coach or played for the school. During the Spanish–American War, West served as a captain of marines.

On June 14, 1914, during custody dispute over his nine-year-old daughter, West was found in a Chattanooga, Tennessee hotel room with a self-inflicted gunshot wound to the head. He survived his injuries, but died of kidney failure in Rhea Springs, Tennessee on July 17, 1914.

== Head coaching record ==
Year	Team	Overall	Conference	Standing	Bowl/playoffs
Georgia Tech (Independent) (1892)
1892	Georgia Tech	0–3			
Georgia Tech:		0–3			
Total:		0–3			
