= William Ford Bull =

American football player and coach (1876–1941)

William Bull
Biographical details
- Born: February 2, 1876; Norfolk, Virginia, U.S.
- Died: December 17, 1941 (aged 65); Norfolk, Virginia, U.S.

Playing career
- 1892–1894: Hampden–Sydney

Coaching career (HC unless noted)
- 1894: Hampden–Sydney

William Ford Bull (February 2, 1876 – December 17, 1941) was an American football player and coach and international Christian missionary. He credited with starting intercollegiate athletics at Hampden–Sydney College in Hampden Sydney, Virginia and initiating the school's first football team. He led the Hampden–Sydney squad as a player in 1892 and 1893 and as a player-coach in 1894. After graduating, he became a Christian missionary in Korea for the Southern Presbyterian Church, where he is credited with "leading thousands to Christ."
