= 1892 Biddle vs. Livingstone football game =

- The Birth of Black College Football
Biddle	Livingstone
(1–0)	(0–1)
4	0
Head coach: Charles Shute	Head coach: William J. Trent
	1	2	Total
Biddle	4	0	4
Livingstone	0	0	0
- Date: December 27, 1892
- Season: 1892
- Location: Salisbury, North Carolina, U.S.
- Referee: Walter Murphy (umpire); Peter Hairston (referee)

The 1892 Biddle vs. Livingstone football game was an American college football game between the Biddle football team of Biddle University (now known as Johnson C. Smith University) and the Livingstone football team of Livingstone College. Referred to as "The Birth of Black College Football," it was the first game between two historically black colleges and universities (HBCUs). Biddle won the game by a score of 4–0. (Note: Many modern sources conflict over whether the score was 4–0 or 5–0; one of the few contemporary reports stated the former.)

== Background ==
The first American football game took place in 1869 between Rutgers University and Princeton University. Players at the time wore no helmets, no pads, and attempted no passes, with an emphasis placed on the kicking game (touchdowns were then worth four points and field goals five). The sport was beginning to become popular in North Carolina by the early 1890s, with several schools in the state having teams by that time.

== Lead-up ==
Students at Biddle University (now known as Johnson C. Smith University) had played intramural football for two years when they decided to challenge another school. Charles Shute of Biddle was friends with William J. Trent of Livingstone College and the students of each agreed to play each other in the 1892 season. While Biddle had had two years experience, Livingstone was just forming their football team.

Albert Bimper, in his book Black Collegiate Athletes and the Neoliberal State, said that "In nearly every sense of the meaning, this first meeting epitomized the determined sacrifices that undergird the black freedom struggle. You see, for the hopes of this first football game to come to fruition, it would insist upon the dreams and efforts of more than just a few determined athletes, but that of a determined village of black college students filled with innovative spirits and unremitting resolve."

Both schools' students worked together get the uniforms and equipment for the game. Biddle students put together old clothes to make their uniforms and wore caps and hoods to protect their heads. The Livingstone students put together all the money they could acquire and were able to purchase one ball and uniform from Spaulding Sporting Goods. The single uniform was given to the women of the Livingstone industrial department, and they used it as the design for the team's jerseys, sewing them out of duckling cloth. The players screwed in cleats to their street shoes to make their footwear for the game.

The game was scheduled for December 27, 1892, and the Biddle players practiced during their Christmas holiday to prepare. A news report prior to the game said that "The Livingstone boys are sanguine of success while the boys from Biddle are quite confident that they won't be beaten."

== The game ==
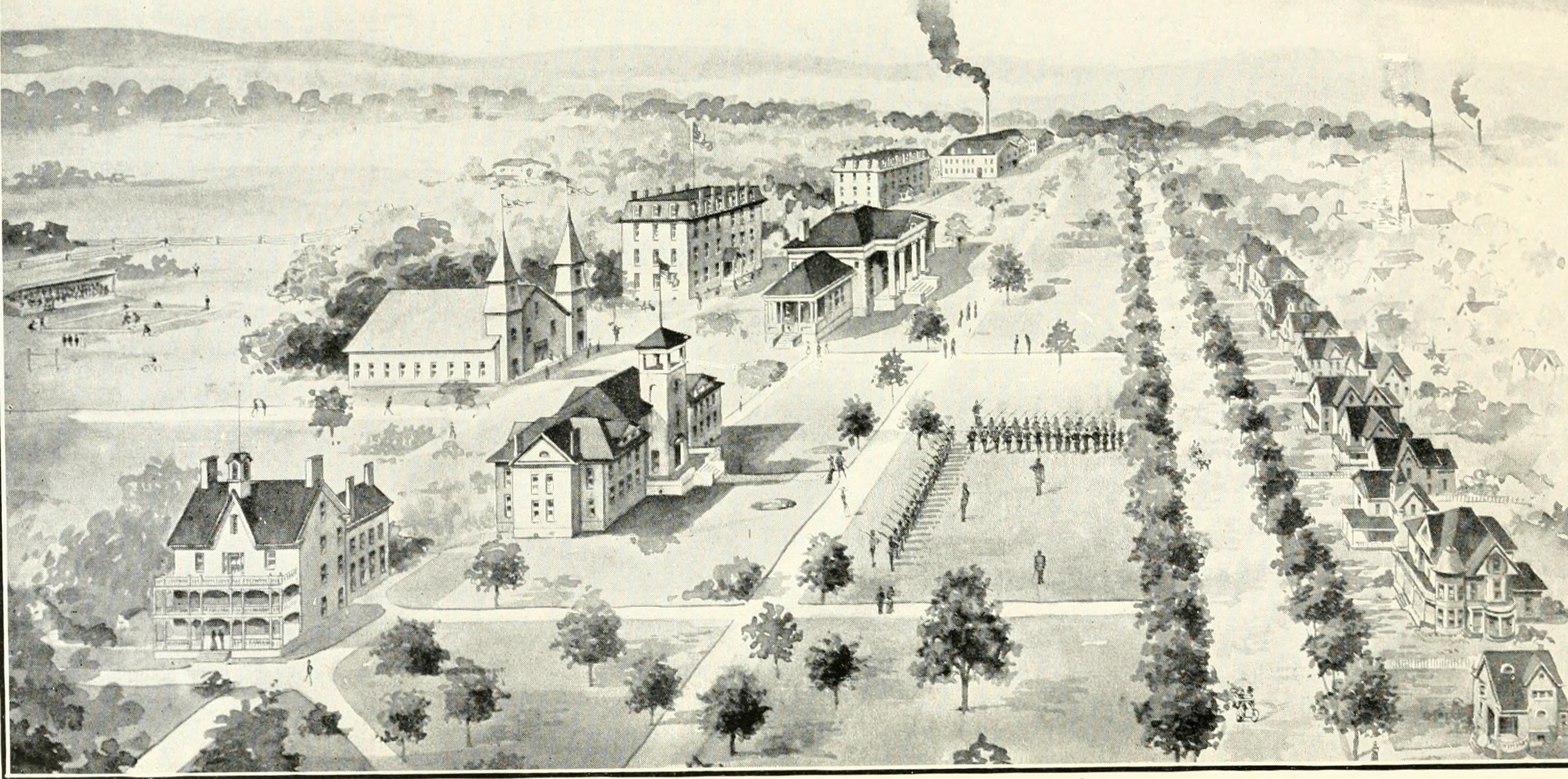
Illustration of Livingstone College (1914)

The game was played on a converted cow pasture, in what is now Livingstone's front campus, in Salisbury, North Carolina, with Biddle players riding a segregated train car and on horse-led wagons from the train station to get to the game. The field was covered in five inches of snow. A report in The Mecklenburg Times noted that "The air was filled with whirling snowflakes" and that "this was the first snow seen hereabouts in several years."

The game included two halves of 45 minutes each. Small groups of fans were scattered along the sidelines. In the first half, an unknown Biddle player ran across the goal-line for what would be the game's only points. Later in the game, a Biddle player fumbled and William J. Trent, Livingstone, returned it for what appeared to be a touchdown; however, the Biddle players argued to the referee that the player was out of bounds and the score was reversed. Thus Biddle won, 4–0.

According to a report in The Charlotte Observer, the game was umpired by Walter Murphy while Peter Hairston was the referee. A historical account listed the roster of the Livingstone team, which featured: J. W. Walker, captain, William J. Trent, manager, R. J. Rencher, Henry Rives, C. N. Garland, J. R. Dillard, J. B. A. Yelverton, Wade Hampton, Charles H. Patrick, J. J. Taylor and F. H. Cummings.

== Aftermath ==
James L. Conyers Jr. wrote that the Livingstone and Biddle players had "no idea that they were pioneering the sport for Black colleges, yet that is exactly what they did on December 27, [1892]." The game was the first ever matchup between two black colleges in what is now called "The Birth of Black College Football." Few contemporary reports exist of the game, and thus many modern sources conflict over whether the score was 4–0 or 5–0; a December 27, 1892 report by The Charlotte Observer stated the former.

A newspaper report from after the game said that the Biddle players planned to "return at their earliest convenience", although they did not play Livingstone again until 1912. Since then, they annually play each other in a rivalry known as the Commemorative Classic. A plaque was built at Livingstone in 1956 to remember the game.

William Trent went on to become Livingstone's longest-serving president and was the last surviving Livingstone player from the game; a memorial to him was built on the field where the game was played, in front of markers honoring Langston Hughes, William Shakespeare and school founder Joseph C. Price.
