= 1892 Orange Athletic Club football team =

American college football season

1892 Orange Athletic Club football
- Conference: American Football Union
- Record: 4–4–1 (1–1 AFU)
- Home stadium: Orange Oval

1892 American Football Union standings
	Conf.					Overall
Team	W		L		T	W		L		T
Crescent Athletic Club $	2	–	0	–	0	2	–	3	–	1
Orange Athletic Club	1	–	1	–	0	4	–	4	–	1
New York Athletic Club	0	–	2	–	0	-	–	-	–	-

The 1892 Orange Athletic Club football team was an American football team that represented the Orange Athletic Club in the American Football Union (AFU) during the 1892 college football season. The AFU in 1892 consisted of three amateur football teams – the Orange Athletic Club, the New York Athletic Club from Manhattan, and the Crescent Athletic Club from Brooklyn. The Orange team played its home games at the Orange Oval in East Orange, New Jersey, compiled a 4–4–4 record (1–1 against AFU opponents), and played against some of the best teams in the country, losing to Yale 58 to 0 and Princeton 23 to 0. On December 17, the OAC faced the Varuna Boat Club of Bay Ridge in one of the most well-known sport venues in the United States, Madison Square Garden.

== Schedule ==
Date	Opponent	Site	Result	Attendance
October 1	Stevens*	Orange Oval; Orange, NJ	T 4–4	1,000–1,500
October 8	Rutgers*	Orange Oval; Orange, NJ	W 22–10	900–1,000
October 15	Lehigh*	Orange Oval; Orange, NJ	W 8–4	2,000
October 22	Yale*	Orange Oval; Orange, NJ	L 0–58	2,000–3,000
October 29	Crescent Athletic Club	Orange Oval; Orange, NJ	L 0–14	
November 5	New York Athletic Club	Orange Oval; Orange, NJ	W 18–6	
November 8	Princeton*	Orange Oval; Orange, NJ	L 0–23	2,500–3,000
November 12	Lafayette*		L 12–16	
December 17	vs. Varuna Boat Club*	Madison Square Garden; Manhattan, NY	W 6–0	
*Non-conference game
