= 1892 Yale Bulldogs football team =

American college football season

1892 Yale Bulldogs football
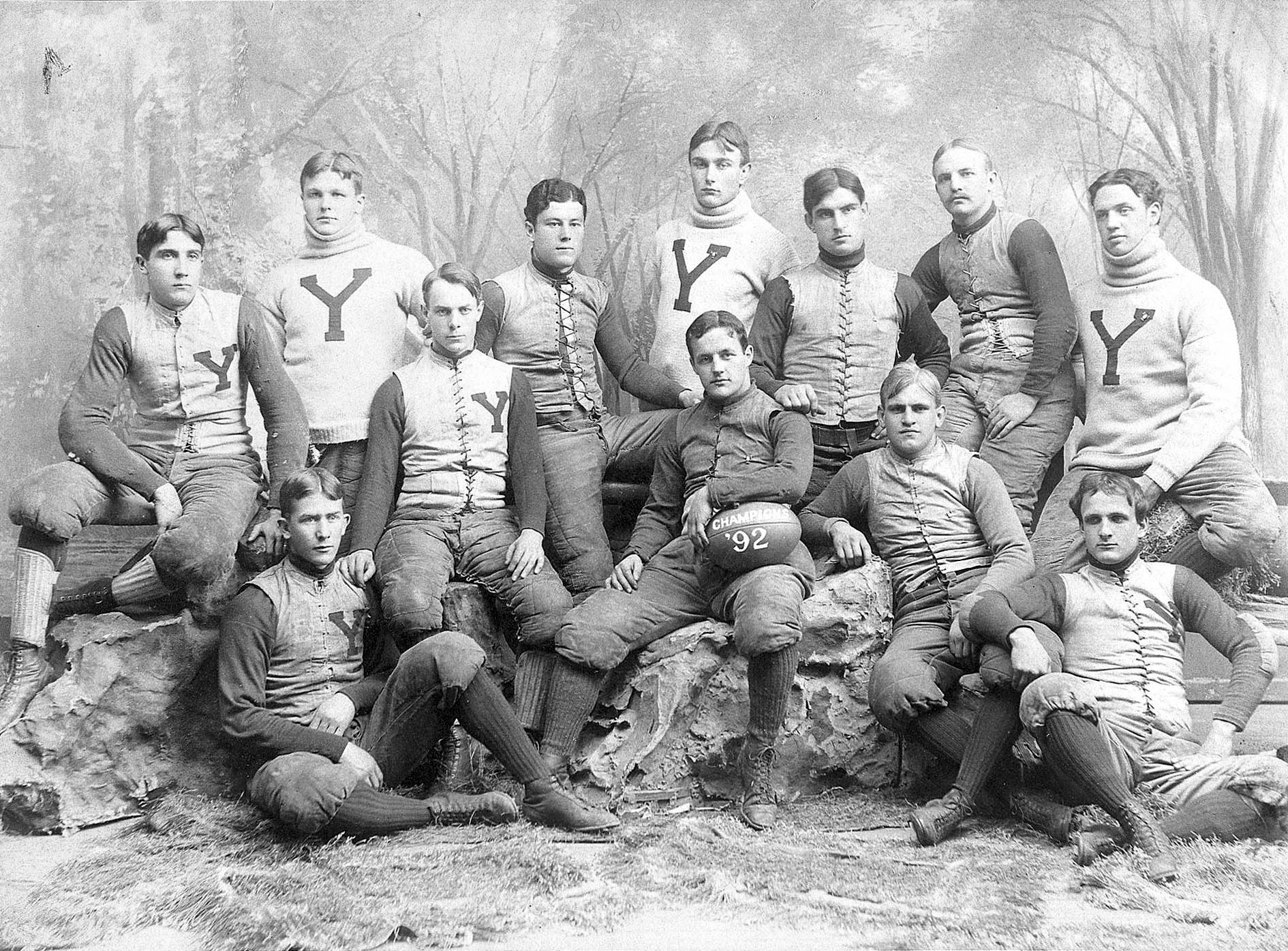

National champion
- Conference: Independent
- Record: 13–0
- Head coach: Walter Camp (5th season)
- Captain: Vance C. McCormick
- Home stadium: Yale Field

1892 Eastern college football independents records
	Conf.			Overall
Team	W	L	T	W		L		T
Yale		–		13	–	0	–	0
Washington & Jefferson		–		4	–	0	–	0
Colgate		–		3	–	0	–	0
Penn		–		15	–	1	–	0
Cornell		–		10	–	1	–	0
Harvard		–		10	–	1	–	0
Princeton		–		12	–	2	–	0
Penn State		–		5	–	1	–	0
Tufts		–		8	–	2	–	0
Navy		–		5	–	2	–	0
Army		–		3	–	1	–	1
Swarthmore		–		7	–	3	–	0
Western Univ. Penn.		–		4	–	2	–	0
Franklin & Marshall		–		4	–	3	–	0
Brown		–		4	–	4	–	2
Bucknell		–		2	–	2	–	0
Fordham		–		2	–	2	–	0
Stevens		–		1	–	1	–	0
Lafayette		–		5	–	7	–	0
Massachusetts		–		4	–	6	–	2
Rutgers		–		3	–	5	–	1
Geneva		–		2	–	4	–	0
Lehigh		–		3	–	6	–	0
Wesleyan		–		1	–	7	–	1
Syracuse		–		0	–	8	–	1
Drexel		–		0	–	1	–	0
NYU		–		0	–	1	–	0

The 1892 Yale Bulldogs football team represented Yale University in the 1892 college football season. In its fifth and final season under head coach Walter Camp, the team finished with a 13–0 record and outscored opponents by a total of 429 to 0. Mike Murphy was the team's trainer. The team is regarded as the 1892 national champion, having been selected retrospectively as such by the Billingsley Report, Helms Athletic Foundation, Houlgate System, National Championship Foundation, and Parke H. Davis. Yale's 1892 season was part of a 37-game winning streak that began with the final game of the 1890 season and stopped at the end of the 1893 season.

After Yale's final game against Princeton, Walter Camp traveled to California where he assumed duty as the head coach of the 1892 Stanford football team.

== Schedule ==
Date	Opponent	Site	Result	Attendance	Source
October 5	Wesleyan	Yale Field; New Haven, CT	W 6–0	3,000	
October 8	at Crescent Athletic Club	Eastern Park; Brooklyn, NY	W 28–0	3,142	
October 12	Williams	Yale Field; New Haven, CT	W 32–0	1,200	
October 15	at Manhattan Athletic Club	Manhattan Field; New York, NY	W 22–0	1,500	
October 19	Amherst	Yale Field; New Haven, CT	W 29–0	1,000–2,000	
October 22	at Orange Athletic Club	Orange, NJ	W 58–0	3,000	
October 26	at Springfield YMCA	Hampden Park; Springfield, MA	W 50–0	400	
October 29	Tufts	Yale Field; New Haven, CT	W 44–0	3,000	
November 5	Wesleyan	Yale Field; New Haven, CT	W 72–0	8,500	
November 8	at New York Athletic Club	Manhattan Field; New York, NY	W 48–0		
November 12	vs. Penn	Manhattan Field; New York, NY	W 28–0	12,000–14,000	
November 19	vs. Harvard	Hampden Park; Springfield, MA (rivalry)	W 6–0	>20,000	
November 24	vs. Princeton	Manhattan Field; New York, NY (rivalry)	W 12–0	35,000	

== Game summaries ==
=== Wesleyan ===
On Wednesday, October 5, Yale opened its season with a 6–0 victory over Wesleyan at Yale Field in New Haven, Connecticut. The game was played in 20-minute halves with strong wind that made kicking difficult.

=== Crescent Athletic Club ===
On October 8, Yale defeated the Crescent Athletic Club eleven by a 28–0 score before a crowd of 3,000 at Eastern Park in Brooklyn. The Bliss brothers, C. D. and Laurie, scored two touchdowns each, and Wallace Winter scored one. Frank Butterworth and Henry S. Graves kicked two goals from touchdown each.

=== Williams ===
On Wednesday, October 12, Yale defeated Williams, 32–0, at Yale Field in New Haven. Yale scored 10 points in the first half and 22 in the second half. Henry S. Graves led the way with four touchdowns, while C. D. Bliss and James McCrea scored one each. Fullback Frank Butterworth made three goals after touchdown and also missed three.

=== Manhattan Athletic Club ===
On October 15, Yale defeated the Manhattan Athletic Club eleven by a 22–0 score before a crowd of 1,500 at Manhattan Field in New York City. Yale's star halfback Laurie Bliss was unable to play due to an ankle injury. With Bliss out of the lineup, Yale did not run around the ends. Instead, Yale ran the tackles and backs through the line. The New York Times concluded that the Yale team "is a weak one at best for Yale, and will have to depend more on a superior knowledge of the game than anything else to win."

=== Amherst ===
On Wednesday, October 19, Yale defeated Amherst, 29–0, at Yale Field in New Haven. Graves scored Yale's first touchdown (valued at four points) on a 65-yard run, but the goal (valued at two points) was missed. On Yale's second possession, Frank Butterworth kicked a goal from field (valued at five points). C. D. Bliss scored a touchdown on Yale's third possession, and the goal was again missed. Yale led, 13–0, at halftime. In the second half, Graves scored on another long run, and Butterworth kicked the goal to extend the lead to 19–0. Bliss scored two additional touchdowns to conclude the scoring.

=== Orange Athletic Club ===
On October 22, Yale defeated the Orange Athletic Club by a 58–0 score before a crowd of almost 3,000 at the Orange Oval in Orange, New Jersey. Harmon S. Graves scored four touchdowns, one on an 80-yard run, and Frank Butterworth scored three.

=== Springfield YMCA ===
On Wednesday, October 26, Yale defeated Springfield YMCA, 50–0, before a crowd of about 400 at Hampden Park in Springfield, Massachusetts. Vance C. McCormick, Laurie Bliss, and Henry S. Graves spent the afternoon scouting the Harvard team in Cambridge. Wallace Winter assumed McCormick's duties in managing the team's play on the field. Frank Butterworth missed five of 10 goals after touchdown. Halfback Herbert W. Hamlin, a substitute, scored three touchdowns in the second half.

=== Tufts ===
On October 29,, Yale defeated Tufts, 44–0, before a crowd of 3,000 at Yale Field in New Haven. Yale played its substitutes, and Herbert W. Hamlin was the star of the game with four touchdowns and runs of 50, 25, 30, and 10 yards around the end. Frank Butterworth scored three touchdowns and kicked four goals.

=== Wesleyan ===
On November 5, Yale defeated Wesleyan, 72–0, before a crowd of 8,500 at Yale Field in New Haven, Connecticut.

=== New York Athletic Club ===
On Tuesday, November 8, Yale defeated the New York Athletic Club by a 48–0 score at the Polo Grounds in New York City. Every member of the Princeton football team, and half of the Penn team, were in attendance to scout Yale. Clifford Bliss scored five touchdowns (valued at four points each), and single touchdowns were scored by Laurence Bliss, Armstrong, Norton, Thorne, and Alexander Hamilton Wallis. Frank Butterworth and Norton kicked two goals from touchdown (valued at two points each).

=== Penn ===
On November 12, Yale defeated Penn, 28–0, before a crowd estimated at between 12,000 and 14,000 at Manhattan Field in New York City. Yale scored 22 points in the first half and began "playing foxy" in the second. The New York Times wrote that the most innovative aspect of Yale's game plan was in its innovative use of "interference" to pave the way for the ball carrier: "A new wrinkle came out yesterday. When a half back started ahead with the ball the first man who took him along would fall in front of the Pennsylvania man about to tackle and this would upset half a dozen men, while another Yale player had jumped quick as a flash ahead of the runner to continue the interference. If another Pennsylvania man tried to tackle the runner the interferer would knock him off while the runner would dodge inside, another Yale man would appear to carry on the runner, and so on until there was a clear field."

=== Harvard ===
On November 19, Yale defeated Harvard, 6–0, before a crowd of over 20,000 at Hampden Park in Springfield, Massachusetts. The game was scoreless until late in the game. With the ball at Harvard's 40-yard line, Yale used "a whirling wedge" to run the ball around the left end to the five-yard line. From that point, Clifford Bliss scored the touchdown, and Frank Butterworth kicked the goal after touchdown. The New York Times declared "Laurie" Bliss as the "hero of the day", making "about all of his side's long runs and half the short ones."

=== Princeton ===
On Thanksgiving Day, November 24, Yale defeated Princeton, 12–0, before a crowd of 35,000 on a cold day at Manhattan Field in New York City. The large crowd overwhelmed the capabilities of the city's elevated railway. At least 3,000 additional spectators watched the game from "Dead-Head Hill," a bluff (also known as Coogan's Bluff) overlooking the field which the owner allowed the crowd to enter at 50 cents per person. Early in the first half, Laurence Bliss ran 40 yards around the left end for a touchdown, and Frank Butterworth kicked goal to give Yale a 6–0 lead. In the second half, Yale center Phillip Stillman blocked a punt by Princeton fullback Sheppard Homans Jr., and the ball was butted beyond the goal line where Stillman fell on it for Yale's second touchdown. Butterworth again kicked goal.

== Awards ==
Three Yale players were selected by both Caspar Whitney and Walter Camp to the 1892 All-America college football team: end Frank Hinkey, tackle Alexander Hamilton Wallis, and quarterback Vance C. McCormick. McCormick was also the team captain. Camp also selected the following Yale players to his second team: halfbacks (and brothers) C. D. Bliss and Laurie Bliss, fullback Frank Butterworth; end John Campbell Greenway; guard James McCrea; and center Phillip Stillman.

== Financial results ==
In March 1893, the team's manager, William Maffit, released the Yale Foot Ball Association's financial report for the 1892 season. The team's expenditures totaled $14,550.82, including $3,174.29 for "hotels and meals"; $2,311.16 for trainer's table and help; $1,505.09 for "railroad fares"; $1,050.45 for "sporting goods"; $1,004.88 for "racks and busses"; $892.48 for "coaching expenses"; $620.34 for "trophies"; $444.05 for "shoes and repairs same"; $312.35 for "fruit and confectionery"; $318.50 for "rubbing team"; $285.00 for "referees and umpires"; and $261.00 for "medical services". The team's receipts totaled $28,732.64, including $12,388.18 from the Princeton game; $10,553.65 from the Harvard game; $2,588.71 for the Penn game; and $541.85 for the N.Y.A.C. game.

== Roster ==
=== Letter winners ===
- George Adee, '95
- Bill Armstrong, '95
- Anson M. Beard, '95
- C. D. Bliss, '93
- Laurie Bliss, '93
- Frank Butterworth, '95
- Thomas Cochran, '94
- Edward V. Cox, '94
- Thomas Dyer, '95
- Harmon S. Graves, '94
- John Campbell Greenway, '95
- Henry S. Graves, '92
- Bill Hickok, '95
- David B. Lyman, 95
- Frank Hinkey, 95
- William Maffit, '93, manager
- Vance C. McCormick, '92
- James A. McCrea, '95
- Eugene Messler, '94
- Charles S. Morris, '96
- William H. Norton, '92
- William M. Richards, '95
- George Sanford, '95
- Phillip Stillman, '95
- Alexander Hamilton Wallis, '93
- Wallace Winter, '93

=== Substitutes ===
- Herbert W. Hamlin
