= 1892 Rutgers Queensmen football team =

American college football season

1892 Rutgers Queensmen football
- Conference: Independent
- Record: 3–5–1
- Head coach: None
- Captain: John C. Loud
- Home stadium: Rutgers Athletic Grounds

1892 Eastern college football independents records
	Conf.			Overall
Team	W	L	T	W		L		T
Yale		–		13	–	0	–	0
Washington & Jefferson		–		4	–	0	–	0
Colgate		–		3	–	0	–	0
Penn		–		15	–	1	–	0
Cornell		–		10	–	1	–	0
Harvard		–		10	–	1	–	0
Princeton		–		12	–	2	–	0
Penn State		–		5	–	1	–	0
Tufts		–		8	–	2	–	0
Navy		–		5	–	2	–	0
Army		–		3	–	1	–	1
Swarthmore		–		7	–	3	–	0
Western Univ. Penn.		–		4	–	2	–	0
Franklin & Marshall		–		4	–	3	–	0
Brown		–		4	–	4	–	2
Bucknell		–		2	–	2	–	0
Fordham		–		2	–	2	–	0
Stevens		–		1	–	1	–	0
Lafayette		–		5	–	7	–	0
Massachusetts		–		4	–	6	–	2
Rutgers		–		3	–	5	–	1
Geneva		–		2	–	4	–	0
Lehigh		–		3	–	6	–	0
Wesleyan		–		1	–	7	–	1
Syracuse		–		0	–	8	–	1
Drexel		–		0	–	1	–	0
NYU		–		0	–	1	–	0

The 1892 Rutgers Queensmen football team represented Rutgers University as an independent during the 1892 college football season. The Queensmen compiled a 3–5–1 record and were outscored by their opponents, 160 to 108. The team had no coach, and its captain was John C. Loud.

== Schedule ==
Date	Opponent	Site	Result	Attendance	Source
October 1	at Princeton	University Field; Princeton, NJ (rivalry)	L 0–30	2,000	
October 8	at Orange Athletic Club	Orange Oval; East Orange, NJ	L 10–22		
October 15	at Lafayette	Easton, PA	W 16–8		
October 22	at New York Athletic Club	Polo Grounds; New York, NY	W 18–0		
October 26	at Manhattan Athletic Club	Neilson's Field; New York, NY	W 30–0	250	
October 29	Lafayette	Rutgers Athletic Grounds; New Brunswick, NJ	L 10–24	350	
November 2	at Stevens	Hoboken, NJ	L 6–22		
November 5	at Navy	Worden Field; Annapolis, MD	L 12–48		
November 7	at Columbia Athletic Club	Boundary Field; Washington, DC	T 6–6		
