= 1892 Crescent Athletic Club football team =

American college football season

1892 Crescent Athletic Club football

AFU champion
- Conference: American Football Union
- Record: 2–3–1 (2–0 AFU)
- Captain: Harry Beecher
- Home stadium: Eastern Park

1892 American Football Union standings
	Conf.					Overall
Team	W		L		T	W		L		T
Crescent Athletic Club $	2	–	0	–	0	2	–	3	–	1
Orange Athletic Club	1	–	1	–	0	4	–	4	–	1
New York Athletic Club	0	–	2	–	0	-	–	-	–	-

The 1892 Crescent Athletic Club football team was an American football team that represented the Crescent Athletic Club in the American Football Union (AFU) during the 1892 college football season. The team played its home games at Eastern Park in Brooklyn, compiled a 2–3–1 record, and won the AFU championship. Harry Beecher, who played for Yale from 1884 to 1887, was the Crescent team's quarterback and captain.

== Schedule ==
Date	Opponent	Site	Result	Attendance	Source
October 8	Yale*	Eastern Park; Brooklyn, NY	L 0–28	3,142	
October 15	Penn*	Eastern Park; Brooklyn, NY	L 0–23		
October 22	Princeton*	Eastern Park; Brooklyn, NY	L 0–42		
October 29	at Orange Athletic Club	Orange Oval; East Orange, NJ	W 14–0		
November 5	Chicago Athletic Association*	Eastern Park; Brooklyn, NY	T 4–4	2,000	
November 12	New York Athletic Club	Eastern Park; Brooklyn, NY	W 20–0		
*Non-conference game
