= 1892 Varuna Boat Club of Bay Ridge football team =

American college football season

1892 Varuna Boat Club football
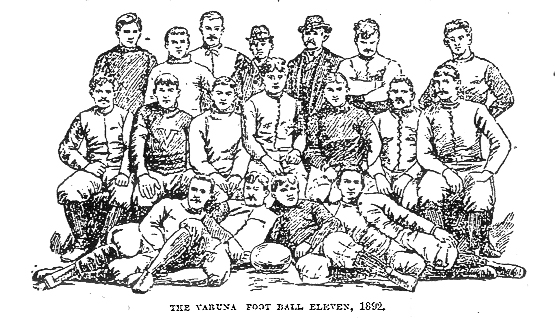
- A picture of the 1892 Varuna Boat Club football team, found in the Brooklyn Daily Eagle.
- Conference: Independent
- Record: 9–3
- Head coach: Crescent Athletic Club players (1st season)
- Home stadium: Varuna Boat Club grounds

The 1892 Varuna Boat Club of Bay Ridge football team was an American football team that represented the Varuna Boating Club of the Bay Ridge area of Brooklyn, New York during the 1892 college football season. The Boating Club, which had established a football program in 1886, compiled a 9–3 record against an assortment of semi-professional and collegiate teams. The final two contests for the Varunas (as the team was otherwise known) were played at Madison Square Garden against the Manhattan and Orange Athletic Clubs.

== Schedule ==
Date	Time	Opponent	Site	Result	Attendance	Source
September 25		Domestic Football Club	Varuna Boat Club grounds; Brooklyn, NY	W 16–4	2,000	
October 2		Volunteers of Harlem		L 4–20 or 4–18		
October 12		Long Island	Varuna Boat Club grounds; Brooklyn, NY	Unknown		
October 16		Cathedral Football Club	Varuna Boat Club grounds; Brooklyn, NY	W (forfeit)		
October 16		Domestic Football Club	Varuna Boat Club grounds; Brooklyn, NY	W 28–4	1,000	
October 21		at Stevens Institute Seconds	Clifton Race Track; Clifton, NJ	W 32–0		
October 23		Pastime Athletic Club	Varuna Boat Club grounds; Brooklyn, NY	W 38–0	1,000	
November 5		Seton Hall		Cancelled		
November 6		Fordham	New York City, NY	W 12–6 (forfeit)	500	
November 8		Acorn Athletic Association	Varuna Boat Club grounds; Brooklyn, NY	W 62–0		
November 13		Domestic Football Club	Varuna Boat Club grounds; Brooklyn, NY	W 12–8		
November 24		Fordham Invincibles (Seconds)		W 16–0		
November 26	12:00 am	vs. Manhattan Athletic Club and Princeton	Madison Square Garden; Manhattan, NY	L 0–6		
December 17		vs. Orange Athletic Club	Madison Square Garden; Manhattan, NY (New York Press Club Carnival of Sports)	L 0–6	400+	

== Second team schedule ==
Date	Opponent	Site	Result	Source
October 29	Columbias of Brooklyn	Varuna Boat Club Grounds; Brooklyn, NY	Unknown	
November 27	Acorn Athletic Association		W 18–14	
