= 1892 Princeton Tigers football team =

American college football season

1892 Princeton Tigers football
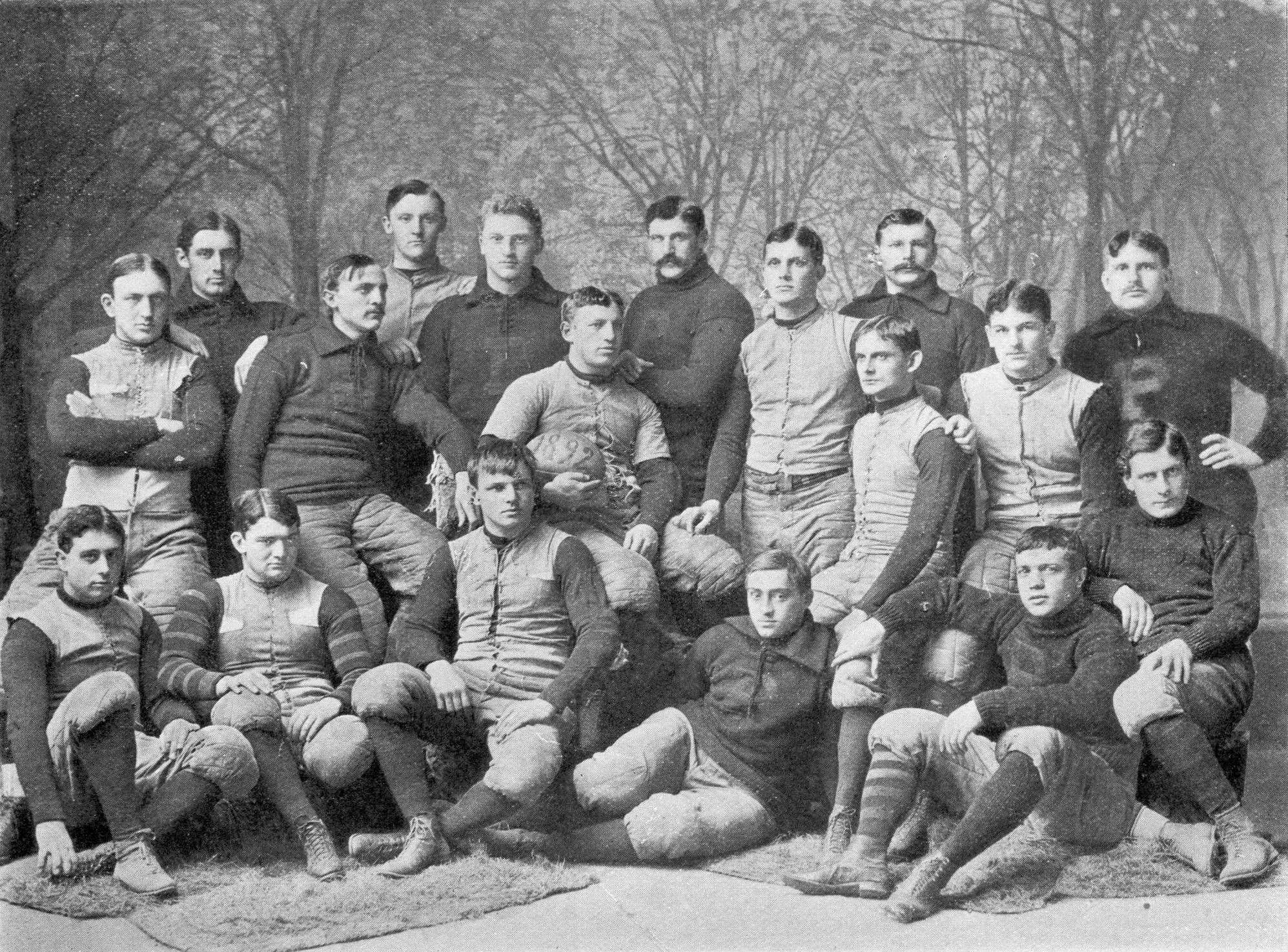
- Conference: Independent
- Record: 12–2
- Head coach: None
- Captain: Philip King
- Home stadium: University Field

1892 Eastern college football independents records
	Conf.			Overall
Team	W	L	T	W		L		T
Yale		–		13	–	0	–	0
Washington & Jefferson		–		4	–	0	–	0
Colgate		–		3	–	0	–	0
Penn		–		15	–	1	–	0
Cornell		–		10	–	1	–	0
Harvard		–		10	–	1	–	0
Princeton		–		12	–	2	–	0
Penn State		–		5	–	1	–	0
Tufts		–		8	–	2	–	0
Navy		–		5	–	2	–	0
Army		–		3	–	1	–	1
Swarthmore		–		7	–	3	–	0
Western Univ. Penn.		–		4	–	2	–	0
Franklin & Marshall		–		4	–	3	–	0
Brown		–		4	–	4	–	2
Bucknell		–		2	–	2	–	0
Fordham		–		2	–	2	–	0
Stevens		–		1	–	1	–	0
Lafayette		–		5	–	7	–	0
Massachusetts		–		4	–	6	–	2
Rutgers		–		3	–	5	–	1
Geneva		–		2	–	4	–	0
Lehigh		–		3	–	6	–	0
Wesleyan		–		1	–	7	–	1
Syracuse		–		0	–	8	–	1
Drexel		–		0	–	1	–	0
NYU		–		0	–	1	–	0

The 1892 Princeton Tigers football team represented Princeton University in the 1892 college football season. The team finished with a 12–2 record. The Tigers recorded 12 shutouts and outscored opponents by a combined total of 473 to 18. The team's sole losses were against Penn and Yale.

Two Princeton players, quarterback Philip King and guard Art Wheeler, were consensus first-team honorees on the 1892 College Football All-America Team. Both were also inducted into the College Football Hall of Fame.

== Schedule ==
Date	Opponent	Site	Result	Attendance	Source
October 1	Rutgers	University Field; Princeton, NJ (rivalry)	W 30–0	2,000	
October 5	at Lehigh	Bethlehem, PA	W 16–0		
October 8	Lafayette	University Field; Princeton, NJ	W 40–0	1,200	
October 14	at Columbia Athletic Club	Washington, DC	W 42–0	1,500	
October 15	at Navy	Worden Field; Annapolis, MD	W 28–0	900	
October 19	Lehigh	University Field; Princeton, NJ	W 52–0	850	
October 21	at New York Athletic Club	Polo Grounds; New York, NY	W 40–0	2,000	
October 22	at Crescent Athletic Club	Eastern Park; Brooklyn, NY	W 42–0		
October 27	Manhattan Athletic Club	University Field; Princeton, NJ	W 46–0		
October 29	vs. Wesleyan	Manhattan Field; New York, NY	W 60–0	3,000	
November 2	Chicago Athletic Association	University Field; Princeton, NJ	W 12–0	3,000	
November 5	at Penn	Germantown Cricket Club; Philadelphia, PA (rivalry)	L 4–6	15,000	
November 8	at Orange Athletic Club	Orange Oval; East Orange, NJ	W 23–0	2,500	
November 24	vs. Yale	Manhattan Field; New York, NY (rivalry)	L 0–12	35,000	

== Roster ==
- Yorke Allen
- H. M. Anderson, FB
- D. M. Balliet, C/G
- H. W. Barnett, HB/FB
- A. C. Bartels, HB
- James Beveridge, HB
- Parke H. Davis, T
- Lawson Fiscus, T/G
- Joseph Marshall Flint, T/HB
- W. H. Fulper, HB
- Forrest M. Hall, G
- Anson Harrold, T
- Augustus Holly, T
- Sheppard Homans, Jr., FB
- Vernon K. Irvine
- D. R. James, HB
- Philip King, HB/QB
- Langdon Lea, T/E
- William McCauley, E
- J. C. McFarlane, G
- Franklin Morse, QB/HB
- Johnny Poe, QB/HB
- M. P. Randolph, E/T
- H. G. Riggs
- J. G. Symmes, C
- Knox Taylor, T
- Thomas Trenchard, E
- H. H. Vincent, E
- Art Wheeler, G
