= 1892 Pittsburgh Athletic Club football season =

American football team season

1892 Pittsburgh Athletic Club football
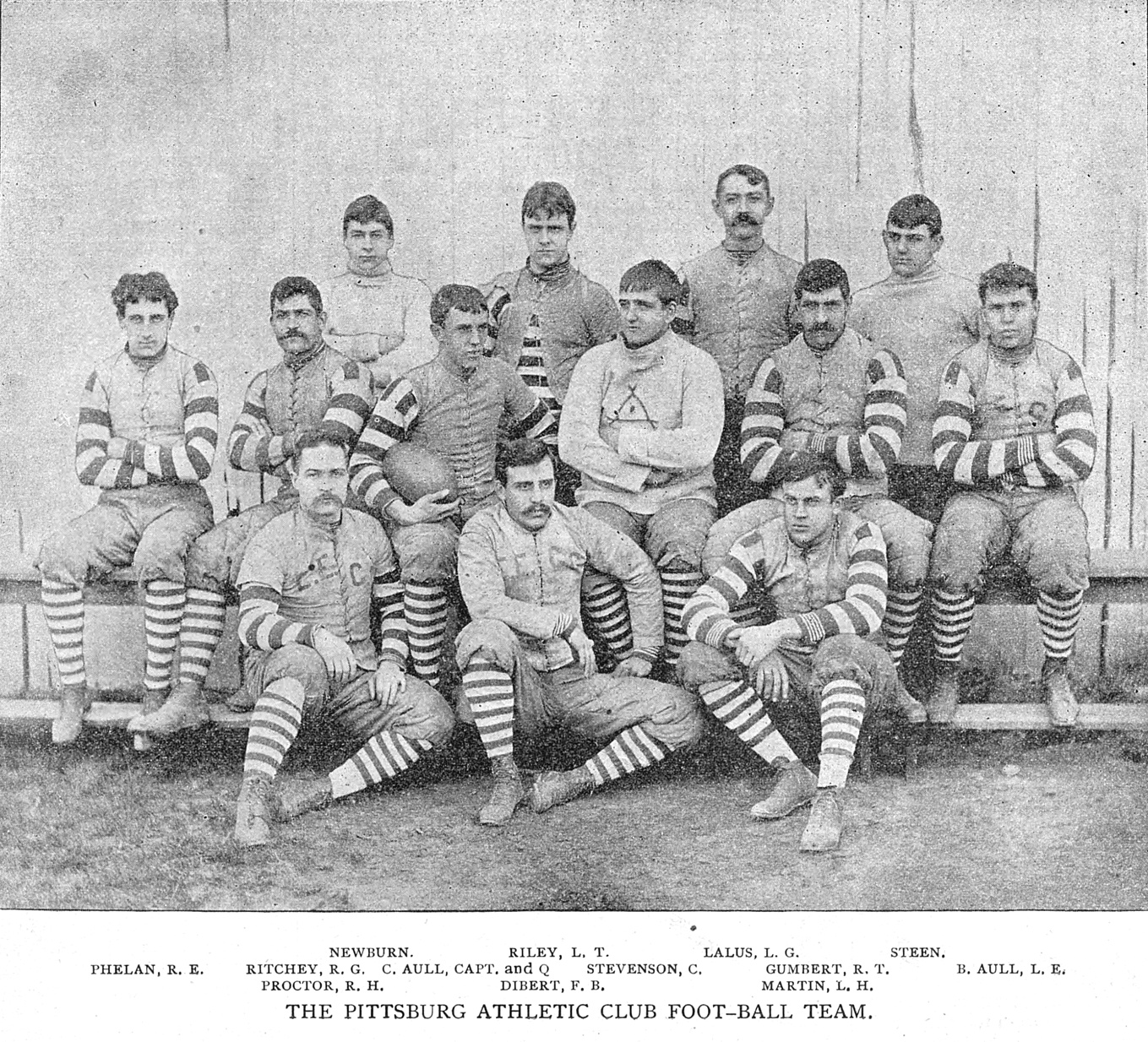
- Record: 3–3–1
- Manager: John B. Barbour Jr.
- Captain: Charley Aull
- Home field: P.A.C. Park

The 1892 Pittsburgh Athletic Club football season was their third season in existence. The team finished with a record of 3–3–1.

The team's November 12 game against the Allegheny Athletic Association, for which Pudge Heffelfinger received $500 to play for Allegheny, marks the first recorded appearance of a professional player in American football.

== Schedule ==
Date	Opponent	Site	Result	Source
October 1	Western University of Pennsylvania	PAC Park (Note: Also known near the beginning of the season as the East End Gym park or grounds, corresponding to the club's recently changed old name.); Pittsburgh, PA	W 16–0	
October 8	Greensburg Athletic Association	PAC Park; Pittsburgh, PA	W 28–0	
October 15	Opponent did not show (Note: An intrasquad scrimmage of sorts occurred after the Johnstown Athletic Club failed to show. PAC's first string defeated a picked team including several second string PAC players, 42–0 or 42–9.)	PAC Park; Pittsburgh, PA		
October 21	Allegheny Athletic Association (Note: Allegations of professionalism, as A.C. Read, the captain of the Penn State football team, was caught playing in this game for Pittsburgh.)	PAC Park; Pittsburgh, PA	T 6–6	
October 22	Geneva	PAC Park; Pittsburgh, PA	W 18–6	
November 5	Penn State	PAC Park; Pittsburgh, PA	L 0–16	
November 12	at Allegheny Athletic Association	AAA Park; Allegheny, PA	L 0–4	
November 24	Lehigh (Note: Thanksgiving Day game)	PAC Park; Pittsburgh, PA	L 0–21	
