= 1892 Penn State football team =

American college football season

1892 Penn State football
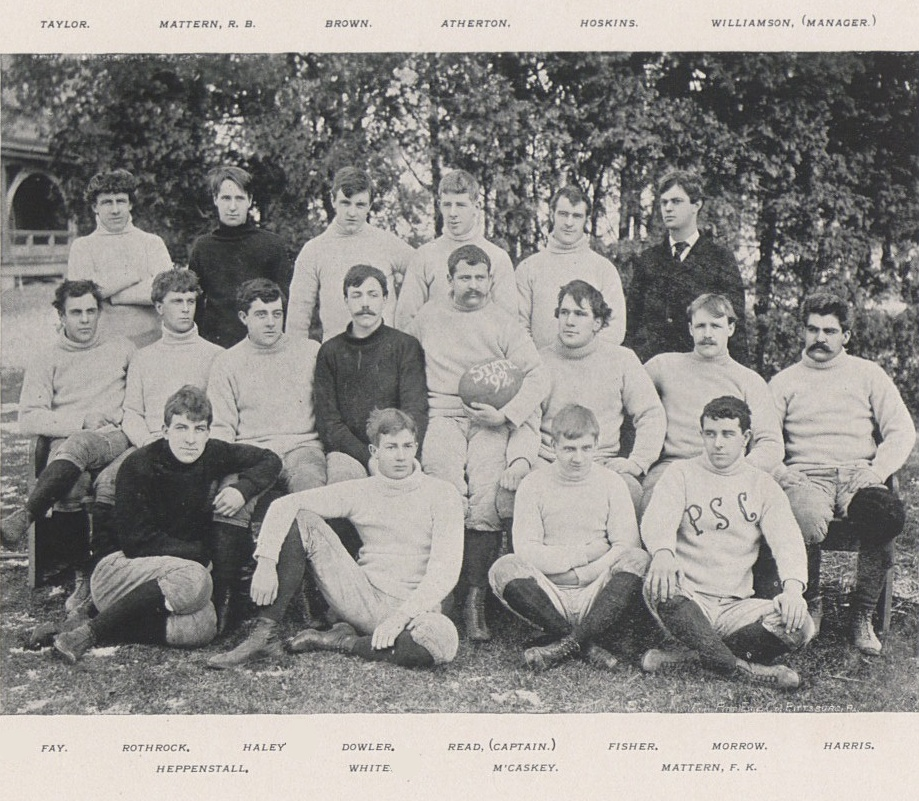
- Conference: Independent
- Record: 5–1
- Head coach: George W. Hoskins (1st season)
- Captain: A. C. Read
- Home stadium: Old Main lawn

1892 Eastern college football independents records
	Conf.			Overall
Team	W	L	T	W		L		T
Yale		–		13	–	0	–	0
Washington & Jefferson		–		4	–	0	–	0
Colgate		–		3	–	0	–	0
Penn		–		15	–	1	–	0
Cornell		–		10	–	1	–	0
Harvard		–		10	–	1	–	0
Princeton		–		12	–	2	–	0
Penn State		–		5	–	1	–	0
Tufts		–		8	–	2	–	0
Navy		–		5	–	2	–	0
Army		–		3	–	1	–	1
Swarthmore		–		7	–	3	–	0
Western Univ. Penn.		–		4	–	2	–	0
Franklin & Marshall		–		4	–	3	–	0
Brown		–		4	–	4	–	2
Bucknell		–		2	–	2	–	0
Fordham		–		2	–	2	–	0
Stevens		–		1	–	1	–	0
Lafayette		–		5	–	7	–	0
Massachusetts		–		4	–	6	–	2
Rutgers		–		3	–	5	–	1
Geneva		–		2	–	4	–	0
Lehigh		–		3	–	6	–	0
Wesleyan		–		1	–	7	–	1
Syracuse		–		0	–	8	–	1
Drexel		–		0	–	1	–	0
NYU		–		0	–	1	–	0

The 1892 Penn State football team was an American football team that represented Pennsylvania State College—now known as Pennsylvania State University–as an independent during the 1892 college football season. The team was coached by George W. Hoskins and played its home games on the Old Main lawn in University Park, Pennsylvania.

== Schedule ==
Date	Opponent	Site	Result	Source
October 1	at Penn	University Athletic Grounds; Philadelphia, PA	L 0–20	
October 14	at Wyoming Seminary	West Side Park; Wilkes-Barre, PA	W 40–0	
November 5	at Pittsburgh Athletic Club	PAC Park; Pittsburgh, PA	W 16–0	
November 12	Bucknell	Old Main; State College, PA	W 18–0	
November 23	vs. Lafayette	West Side Park; Wilkes-Barre, PA	W 18–0	
November 24	vs. Dickinson	Island Park; Harrisburg, PA	W 16–0	
