= 1892 Cornell Big Red football team =

American college football season

1892 Cornell Big Red football
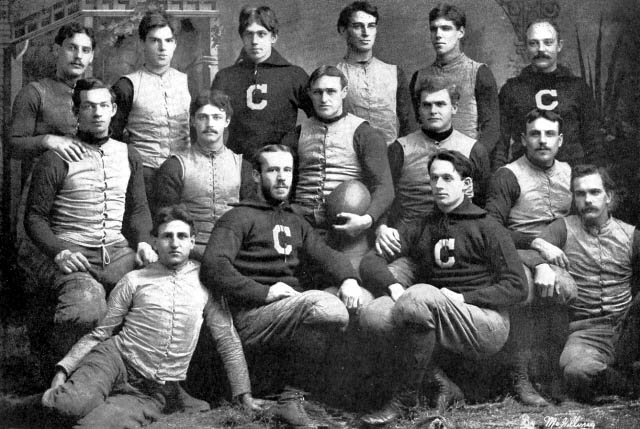
- Conference: Independent
- Record: 10–1
- Head coach: Carl Johanson (1st season)
- Captain: Carl Johanson
- Home stadium: Percy Field

1892 Eastern college football independents records
| | Conf. | | | Overall |
| Team | W | L | T | W | | L | | T |
|---|---|---|---|---|---|---|---|---|
| Yale | | – | | 13 | – | 0 | – | 0 |
| Washington & Jefferson | | – | | 4 | – | 0 | – | 0 |
| Colgate | | – | | 3 | – | 0 | – | 0 |
| Penn | | – | | 15 | – | 1 | – | 0 |
| Cornell | | – | | 10 | – | 1 | – | 0 |
| Harvard | | – | | 10 | – | 1 | – | 0 |
| Princeton | | – | | 12 | – | 2 | – | 0 |
| Penn State | | – | | 5 | – | 1 | – | 0 |
| Tufts | | – | | 8 | – | 2 | – | 0 |
| Navy | | – | | 5 | – | 2 | – | 0 |
| Army | | – | | 3 | – | 1 | – | 1 |
| Swarthmore | | – | | 7 | – | 3 | – | 0 |
| Western Univ. Penn. | | – | | 4 | – | 2 | – | 0 |
| Franklin & Marshall | | – | | 4 | – | 3 | – | 0 |
| Brown | | – | | 4 | – | 4 | – | 2 |
| Bucknell | | – | | 2 | – | 2 | – | 0 |
| Fordham | | – | | 2 | – | 2 | – | 0 |
| Stevens | | – | | 1 | – | 1 | – | 0 |
| Lafayette | | – | | 5 | – | 7 | – | 0 |
| Massachusetts | | – | | 4 | – | 6 | – | 2 |
| Rutgers | | – | | 3 | – | 5 | – | 1 |
| Geneva | | – | | 2 | – | 4 | – | 0 |
| Lehigh | | – | | 3 | – | 6 | – | 0 |
| Wesleyan | | – | | 1 | – | 7 | – | 1 |
| Syracuse | | – | | 0 | – | 8 | – | 1 |
| Drexel | | – | | 0 | – | 1 | – | 0 |
| NYU | | – | | 0 | – | 1 | – | 0 |

The 1892 Cornell Big Red football team was an American football team that represented Cornell University during the 1892 college football season. The team compiled a 10–1 record and outscored all opponents by a combined total of 432 to 54. Its sole loss was by a 20–14 score against Harvard.

== Schedule ==
| Date | Opponent | Site | Result | Attendance | Source |
|---|---|---|---|---|---|
| September 24 | at Syracuse Athletic Club | Syracuse, NY | W 16–0 | | |
| September 28 | Syracuse | Percy Field; Ithaca, NY | W 58–0 | | |
| October 1 | Bucknell | Percy Field; Ithaca, NY | W 54–0 | | |
| October 15 | Dickinson | Percy Field; Ithaca, NY | W 58–0 | | |
| October 22 | at Lehigh | Bethlehem, PA | W 76–0 | | |
| October 29 | vs. Williams | Ridgefield grounds; Albany, NY | W 24–12 | 1,000–2,000 | |
| November 5 | vs. Harvard | Hampden Park; Springfield, MA | L 14–20 | | |
| November 8 | Michigan | Percy Field; Ithaca, NY | W 44–0 | 1,200 | |
| November 12 | MIT | Percy Field; Ithaca, NY | W 44–12 | | |
| November 18 | at Manhattan Athletic Club | Manhattan Field; New York, NY | W 16–0 | | |
| November 22 | vs. Michigan | Detroit Athletic Club grounds; Detroit, MI | W 30–10 | 3,000–3,500 | |
