= Carl Johanson =

American football player and coach (1863–1933)

Biographical details
- Born: 1863
- Died: August 2, 1933 (aged 69); Seattle, Washington, U.S.

Playing career
- 1880s: Williams
- 1880s: Harvard
- 1890–1892: Cornell
- Position(s): Tackle

Coaching career (HC unless noted)
- 1892–1893: Cornell

Head coaching record
- Overall: 13–6–1

Carl Magnue Johanson (1863 – August 2, 1933) was an American college football player and coach, known as the "father of Cornell football". He convinced Pop Warner to attend Cornell. Johanson died at the age of 69, on August 2, 1933, in Seattle, Washington.

== Head coaching record ==
Year	Team	Overall	Conference	Standing	Bowl/playoffs
Cornell Big Red (Independent) (1892–1893)
1892	Cornell	10–1			
1893	Cornell	3–5–1			
Cornell:		13–6–1			
Total:		13–6–1			

== See also ==
- Carl Johanson at Find a Grave
