= 1892 Chicago Athletic Association football team =

American football team season

1892 Chicago Athletic Association football
- League: Independent
- Record: 3–4–1
- Captain: Billy Crawford
- Home field: South Side Park

The 1892 Chicago Athletic Association football team represented Chicago Athletic Association as an independent during the 1892 college football season. The team finished with a 3–4–1 record.

== Schedule ==
Date	Opponent	Site	Result	Attendance	Source
October 8	Northwestern	South Side Park; Chicago, IL	W 10–0	500	
October 22	at Cleveland Athletic Club	Cleveland, OH	W 28–0		
October 24	at Rochester	Rochester, NY	W 35–0		
October 26	at Harvard	Jarvis Field; Cambridge, MA	L 0–28 or 0–32	4,000	
October 29	at Penn	University Athletic Grounds; Philadelphia, PA	L 10–12	2,500	
November 2	at Princeton	University Field; Princeton, NJ	L 0–12	3,000	
November 5	at Crescent Athletic Club	Eastern Park; Brooklyn, NY	T 4–4		
November 24	Boston Athletic Association	South Side Park; Chicago, IL	L 12–18		
