= Jordan C. Wells =

American football player and coach (1861–1946)

Biographical details
- Born: October 20, 1861; Newfoundland Colony
- Died: February 8, 1946 (aged 84); Hartford, Connecticut, U.S.
- Education: Wesleyan University (1888)

Playing career
- 1886: Wesleyan

Coaching career (HC unless noted)
- 1892: Syracuse
- 1905: Wesleyan (assistant)

Head coaching record
- Overall: 0–8–1

Jordan C. Wells (October 20, 1861 – February 8, 1946) was an American college football player and coach. He served as the head football coach at Syracuse University for one season in 1892, compiling a record of 0–8–1. Wells attended Wesleyan University, where he played football, serving as the team's captain in 1886.

In 1905, Wells assisted Howard R. Reiter in coaching the football team as his alma mater, Wesleyan. Wells was later associated with the Aetna Life Insurance Company. He resided in Wethersfield, Connecticut, and was a trustee of the Methodist church located in the town. Wells died on February 8, 1946, at Saint Francis Hospital in Hartford, Connecticut. He was interred at Cedar Hill Cemetery in Hartford.

== Head coaching record ==
Year	Team	Overall	Conference	Standing	Bowl/playoffs
Syracuse Orangemen (Independent) (1892)
1892	Syracuse	0–8–1			
Syracuse:		0–8–1			
Total:		0–8–1			
