= 1892 Fordham football team =

American college football season

1892 Fordham football
- Conference: Independent
- Record: 33–7
- Head coach: Harry Ely (1st season)
- Captain: Thomas Ferguson

1892 Eastern college football independents records
	Conf.			Overall
Team	W	L	T	W		L		T
Yale		–		13	–	0	–	0
Washington & Jefferson		–		4	–	0	–	0
Colgate		–		3	–	0	–	0
Penn		–		15	–	1	–	0
Cornell		–		10	–	1	–	0
Harvard		–		10	–	1	–	0
Princeton		–		12	–	2	–	0
Penn State		–		5	–	1	–	0
Tufts		–		8	–	2	–	0
Navy		–		5	–	2	–	0
Army		–		3	–	1	–	1
Swarthmore		–		7	–	3	–	0
Western Univ. Penn.		–		4	–	2	–	0
Franklin & Marshall		–		4	–	3	–	0
Brown		–		4	–	4	–	2
Bucknell		–		2	–	2	–	0
Fordham		–		2	–	2	–	0
Stevens		–		1	–	1	–	0
Lafayette		–		5	–	7	–	0
Massachusetts		–		4	–	6	–	2
Rutgers		–		3	–	5	–	1
Geneva		–		2	–	4	–	0
Lehigh		–		3	–	6	–	0
Wesleyan		–		1	–	7	–	1
Syracuse		–		0	–	8	–	1
Drexel		–		0	–	1	–	0
NYU		–		0	–	1	–	0

The 1892 Fordham football team, also known as the St. John's football team, was an American football team that represented Fordham College, also known as St. John's College, as an independent during the 1892 college football season. Under first-year head coach Harry Ely, Fordham claims a 33–7 record. No contemporaneous press report has been found for many of the games, and a newspaper report from late November 1892 stated that Fordham disbanded its team with a 3–2 record. College Football Data Warehouse (CFDW) lists the team's record at 2–2. Opponents recognized by CFDW are displayed in bold in the schedule chart below.

== Schedule ==
Date	Opponent	Site	Result	Attendance	Source
	**New York Athletic Club**		W 5–0		
	**Y.M.C.A.**		W 39–0		
October 27	at **Stevens**	St. George's Cricket Grounds; Hoboken, NJ	L 0–22		
November 6	**Varuna Boat Club**	New York, NY	L 6–12		
	Deaf Mutes		W 29–4		
	St. Francis Xavier		W 28–7		
	Columbia freshmen		W		
	St. Francis Xavier		W 6–0		
	Verona Boat Club		L 0–16		
	Hawthorne Athletic Club		W 10–4		
	Sagamore Athletic Club		W 6–0		
	Hobokens		W 30–0		
	Hobokens		W 24–6		
	Dominican		W 29–0		
	St. Agnes Lyceum		W 52–6		
	Paterson YMCA		W 37–6		
	St. Peter's		W 40–0		
	Jerome Club		L 0–10		
	Manhattan Athletic Club		L 0–6		
	American Athletic Club		W 14–4		
	Fordham Prep		W 17–4		
	Fordham reserves		W 20–2		
	Fordham reserves		W 30–12		
	City College		W 15–0		
	Maroons		W 20–14		
	Nutley Athletic Club		W 16–10		
	Maroons		W 18–6		
	Fordham Prep		W 6–0		
	Fordham Prep		L 2–12		
	Berkeley School		W 20–0		
	Sylvans		W		
	Maroons		W 12–10		
	Maroons		W 12–4		
	YMCA (23 St. Branch)		W 5–0		
	Jerome		W 6–0		
	Stephens		W 48–0		
	St. Peter's		W 18–0		
	Volunteers		L 0–10		
	Fordham Prep		W 24–6		
	Mumbles		W 24–0		
