= 1892 Lehigh football team =

American college football season

1892 Lehigh football
- Conference: Independent
- Record: 3–6
- Head coach: John A. Hartwell (1st season)

1892 Eastern college football independents records
	Conf.			Overall
Team	W	L	T	W		L		T
Yale		–		13	–	0	–	0
Washington & Jefferson		–		4	–	0	–	0
Colgate		–		3	–	0	–	0
Penn		–		15	–	1	–	0
Cornell		–		10	–	1	–	0
Harvard		–		10	–	1	–	0
Princeton		–		12	–	2	–	0
Penn State		–		5	–	1	–	0
Tufts		–		8	–	2	–	0
Navy		–		5	–	2	–	0
Army		–		3	–	1	–	1
Swarthmore		–		7	–	3	–	0
Western Univ. Penn.		–		4	–	2	–	0
Franklin & Marshall		–		4	–	3	–	0
Brown		–		4	–	4	–	2
Bucknell		–		2	–	2	–	0
Fordham		–		2	–	2	–	0
Stevens		–		1	–	1	–	0
Lafayette		–		5	–	7	–	0
Massachusetts		–		4	–	6	–	2
Rutgers		–		3	–	5	–	1
Geneva		–		2	–	4	–	0
Lehigh		–		3	–	6	–	0
Wesleyan		–		1	–	7	–	1
Syracuse		–		0	–	8	–	1
Drexel		–		0	–	1	–	0
NYU		–		0	–	1	–	0

The 1892 Lehigh football team was an American football team that represented Lehigh University as an independent during the 1892 college football season. In its first and only season under head coach John A. Hartwell, the team compiled a 3–6 record and was outscored by a total of 164 to 91.

== Schedule ==
Date	Opponent	Site	Result	Attendance	Source
October 1	Swarthmore	Bethlehem, PA	W 51–0		
October 5	Princeton	Bethlehem, PA	L 0–16		
October 12	at Orange Athletic Club	Orange Oval; East Orange, NJ	L 4–8		
October 19	at Princeton	Princeton, NJ	L 0–50	850	
October 22	Cornell	Bethlehem, PA	L 0–76		
November 5	at Lafayette	Easton, PA (rivalry)	L 0–4		
November 8	at Penn	Philadelphia, PA	L 0–4		
November 19	Lafayette	Bethlehem, PA (rivalry)	W 15–6		
November 24	at Pittsburgh Athletic Club	Pittsburgh, PA	W 21–0	3,000	
