= Preston Smith (American football coach) =

American football player and coach (1871–1945)

Biographical details
- Born: May 17, 1871; Hamilton, New York, U.S.
- Died: December 16, 1945 (aged 74); Cranford, New Jersey, U.S.
- Education: Colgate University (1893)

Playing career
- 1890–1892: Colgate

Coaching career (HC unless noted)
- 1892: Colgate

Head coaching record
- Overall: 3–0

Preston Hopkins Smith (May 17, 1871 – December 16, 1945) was an American football player and coach. He was the second head football coach at Colgate University and he held that position for the 1892 season. His coaching record at Colgate was 3–0. The 1892 team was the first in Colgate history to go undefeated, with victories over Hamilton, Rochester, and St. John's Academy. Some sources say that the 1892 team was coached by Samuel Colgate, Jr. and not Smith.

Smith attended Colgate and received a Bachelor of Philosophy degree in 1893. He played on the football team from 1890 to 1893, serving as captain in 1891 and 1892 (player-coach in the latter year). He lettered in the sport in 1890, 1891 and 1892.

Smith married Cordelia (Cora) Roberts in 1895. He later moved to Bayonne, New Jersey where he was a school principal. He died in 1945.

== Head coaching record ==
Year	Team	Overall	Conference	Standing	Bowl/playoffs
Colgate (Independent) (1892)
1892	Colgate	3–0			
Colgate:		3–0			
Total:		3–0			
