= Charles P. Howland =

American football coach and lawyer (1869–1932)

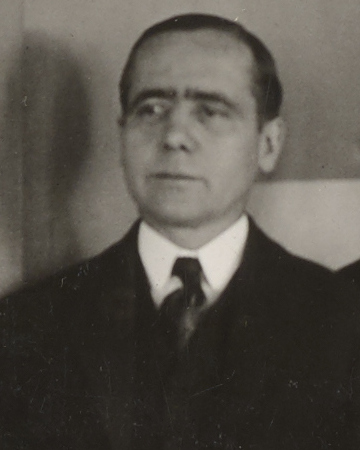
- Howland in March 1918

Biographical details
- Born: September 15, 1869; New York City, New York, U.S.
- Died: November 12, 1932 (aged 63); New Haven, Connecticut, U.S.

Coaching career (HC unless noted)
- 1892: Brown

Head coaching record
- Overall: 4–4–2

Charles Prentice Howland (September 15, 1869 – November 12, 1932) was an American football coach and lawyer. He was the first head football coach at Brown University. He coached the Brown Bears football program for the 1892 season and compiled a record of 4–4–2. Howland graduated from Yale University in 1891, and received a law degree from Harvard Law School in 1894. He later practiced law in New York City and worked as a research associate at his alma mater, Yale.

Howland was later a faculty member and research associate at Yale. During World War I, he was a counsel to the Emergency Fleet Corporation and also served on the priorities committee of the War Industries Board. From 1927 to 1931, Howland was director of research for the Council on Foreign Relations. He was killed in an automobile accident on November 12, 1932, in New Haven, Connecticut.

== Head coaching record ==
| Year | Team | Overall | Conference | Standing | Bowl/playoffs |
|---|---|---|---|---|---|
Brown Bears (Independent) (1892)
| 1892 | Brown | 4–4–2 | | | |
| Brown: | | 4–4–2 | | | |
| Total: | | 4–4–2 | | | |

== See also ==
- Howland Memorial Prize
