= 1892 Brown Bears football team =

American college football season

1892 Brown Bears football
- Conference: Independent
- Record: 4–4–2
- Head coach: Charles P. Howland (1st season)
- Captain: R. W. Drawbridge
- Home stadium: Lincoln Field

1892 Eastern college football independents records
	Conf.			Overall
Team	W	L	T	W		L		T
Yale		–		13	–	0	–	0
Washington & Jefferson		–		4	–	0	–	0
Colgate		–		3	–	0	–	0
Penn		–		15	–	1	–	0
Cornell		–		10	–	1	–	0
Harvard		–		10	–	1	–	0
Princeton		–		12	–	2	–	0
Penn State		–		5	–	1	–	0
Tufts		–		8	–	2	–	0
Navy		–		5	–	2	–	0
Army		–		3	–	1	–	1
Swarthmore		–		7	–	3	–	0
Western Univ. Penn.		–		4	–	2	–	0
Franklin & Marshall		–		4	–	3	–	0
Brown		–		4	–	4	–	2
Bucknell		–		2	–	2	–	0
Fordham		–		2	–	2	–	0
Stevens		–		1	–	1	–	0
Lafayette		–		5	–	7	–	0
Massachusetts		–		4	–	6	–	2
Rutgers		–		3	–	5	–	1
Geneva		–		2	–	4	–	0
Lehigh		–		3	–	6	–	0
Wesleyan		–		1	–	7	–	1
Syracuse		–		0	–	8	–	1
Drexel		–		0	–	1	–	0
NYU		–		0	–	1	–	0

The 1892 Brown Bears football team represented Brown University as an independent in the 1892 college football season. Led by Charles P. Howland in his first and only season as head coach, Brown compiled a record of 4–4–2.

== Schedule ==
Date	Time	Opponent	Site	Result	Attendance	Source
October 8		Worcester Tech	Providence, RI	W 8–4		
October 12	3:40 p.m.	at Fall River	Y. M. C. A. grounds; Fall River, MA	W 24–0	300	
October 19		at Phillips Academy	Andover, MA	W 6–4		
October 21		vs. Boston Tech	New Bedford, MA	L 6–30		
November 1		Tufts	Lincoln Field; Providence, RI	L 4–24	300	
November 5		Trinity (CT)	Lincoln Field; Providence, RI	T 0–0	300	
November 9		Boston Tech	Providence, RI	T 6–6	500	
November 11		Bowdoin	Lincoln Field; Providence, RI	L 0–8		
November 12		at Worcester Tech	Worcester Oval; Worcester, MA	L 0–4		
November 16		Wesleyan	Lincoln Field; Providence, RI	W 6–0		
