= 1892 Army Cadets football team =

American college football season

1892 Army Cadets football
- Conference: Independent
- Record: 3–1–1
- Head coach: Dennis Michie (2nd season)
- Captain: Elmer Clark
- Home stadium: The Plain

1892 Eastern college football independents records
	Conf.			Overall
Team	W	L	T	W		L		T
Yale		–		13	–	0	–	0
Washington & Jefferson		–		4	–	0	–	0
Colgate		–		3	–	0	–	0
Penn		–		15	–	1	–	0
Cornell		–		10	–	1	–	0
Harvard		–		10	–	1	–	0
Princeton		–		12	–	2	–	0
Penn State		–		5	–	1	–	0
Tufts		–		8	–	2	–	0
Navy		–		5	–	2	–	0
Army		–		3	–	1	–	1
Swarthmore		–		7	–	3	–	0
Western Univ. Penn.		–		4	–	2	–	0
Franklin & Marshall		–		4	–	3	–	0
Brown		–		4	–	4	–	2
Bucknell		–		2	–	2	–	0
Fordham		–		2	–	2	–	0
Stevens		–		1	–	1	–	0
Lafayette		–		5	–	7	–	0
Massachusetts		–		4	–	6	–	2
Rutgers		–		3	–	5	–	1
Geneva		–		2	–	4	–	0
Lehigh		–		3	–	6	–	0
Wesleyan		–		1	–	7	–	1
Syracuse		–		0	–	8	–	1
Drexel		–		0	–	1	–	0
NYU		–		0	–	1	–	0

The 1892 Army Cadets football team represented the United States Military Academy as an independent during the 1892 college football season. In the second full season of Army football, the Cadets compiled a 3–1–1 record, shut out three of their five opponents, and outscored all opponents by a combined total of 90 to 18. In the third annual Army–Navy Game, the Cadets lost to the Midshipmen by a 12 to 4 score.

No Army Cadets were honored on the 1892 College Football All-America Team. Dennis Michie, who was captain of the Army football team in 1890 and 1891, was the coach of the 1892 team. Michie was killed in 1898 during the Spanish–American War. Army's home football stadium, Michie Stadium, was dedicated in his honor when it opened in 1924.

== Schedule ==
Date	Opponent	Site	Result	Attendance	Source
October 8	Wesleyan	The Plain; West Point, NY	T 6–6		
October 22	Stevens	The Plain; West Point, NY	W 42–0		
October 29	Trinity (CT)	The Plain; West Point, NY	W 24–0		
November 19	Princeton "B" team	The Plain; West Point, NY	W 14–0		
November 26	Navy	The Plain; West Point, NY (Army–Navy Game)	L 4–12	3,000	

== Players ==
- Butler Ames, left end
- Thales L. Ames, center
- Jens Bugge
- Thomas Carson
- Elmer Clark, right guard (captain)
- George Houle, left tackle
- Edward L. King, left halfback
- Charles W. Kutz
- Albert Laws, left guard
- Harry Pattison, fullback
- William R. Smedberg Jr.
- Fine W. Smith, right tackle
- Lucian Stacy, right end
- Harry H. Stout, quarterback
- Edward J. Timberlake, right halfback
