= Harry Ely =

American college coach (1854–1928)

Biographical details
- Born: 1854; Brooklyn, New York, U.S.
- Died: April 29, 1928 (aged 74); New York, New York, U.S.

Coaching career (HC unless noted)

Football
- 1892: Fordham
- 1903: Fordham

Baseball
- 1892–1893: Fordham

Head coaching record
- Overall: 9–4 (football); 94–31–2 (baseball)

Harry Allan Ely (1854 – April 29, 1928), sometimes spelled Harry Allen Ely, was an American college football and college baseball coach, United States Army officer, and activist. He served as the head football coach at Fordham University in 1892 and 1903, compiling a record of 9–4. Ely was also the head baseball coach at Fordham from 1892 to 1893, tallying a mark of 94–31–2.

Ely was a graduate of Yale University. He served in the U.S. Army during the Spanish–American War, the Boxer Rebellion, and World War I, reaching the rank of captain. Ely was the chairman of the Audubon Council and the Washington Heights Tenants' Association. He owned and edited The New York Tenant, which advocated for renters. Ely died on April 29, 1928, at his home in Manhattan. He was buried at Woodlawn Cemetery in the Bronx.

== Head coaching record ==
=== Football ===
Year	Team	Overall	Conference	Standing	Bowl/playoffs
Fordham (Independent) (1892)
1892	Fordham	5–3			
Fordham (Independent) (1903)
1903	Fordham	4–1			
Fordham:		9–4			
Total:		9–4			

== See also ==
- List of college football head coaches with non-consecutive tenure
