= 1892 Bucknell football team =

American college football season

1892 Bucknell football
- Conference: Independent
- Record: 2–2
- Head coach: None
- Captain: Levi Riggins

1892 Eastern college football independents records
	Conf.			Overall
Team	W	L	T	W		L		T
Yale		–		13	–	0	–	0
Washington & Jefferson		–		4	–	0	–	0
Colgate		–		3	–	0	–	0
Penn		–		15	–	1	–	0
Cornell		–		10	–	1	–	0
Harvard		–		10	–	1	–	0
Princeton		–		12	–	2	–	0
Penn State		–		5	–	1	–	0
Tufts		–		8	–	2	–	0
Navy		–		5	–	2	–	0
Army		–		3	–	1	–	1
Swarthmore		–		7	–	3	–	0
Western Univ. Penn.		–		4	–	2	–	0
Franklin & Marshall		–		4	–	3	–	0
Brown		–		4	–	4	–	2
Bucknell		–		2	–	2	–	0
Fordham		–		2	–	2	–	0
Stevens		–		1	–	1	–	0
Lafayette		–		5	–	7	–	0
Massachusetts		–		4	–	6	–	2
Rutgers		–		3	–	5	–	1
Geneva		–		2	–	4	–	0
Lehigh		–		3	–	6	–	0
Wesleyan		–		1	–	7	–	1
Syracuse		–		0	–	8	–	1
Drexel		–		0	–	1	–	0
NYU		–		0	–	1	–	0

The 1892 Bucknell football team was an American football team that represented Bucknell University as an independent during the 1892 college football season. The team compiled a 2–2 record and had no head coach. Levi Riggins was the team captain.

== Schedule ==
Date	Time	Opponent	Site	Result	Attendance	Source
October 1		at Cornell	Percy Field; Ithaca, NY	L 0–54		
October 15	2:30 p.m.	Franklin & Marshall	Lewisburg, PA	W 22–12	700	
November 5		Dickinson	Lewisburg, PA	W 38–0		
November 12		at Penn State	State College, PA	L 0–18		
