= 1892 NYU Violets football team =

American college football season

1892 NYU Violets football
- Conference: Independent
- Record: 0–1

1892 Eastern college football independents records
| | Conf. | | | Overall |
| Team | W | L | T | W | | L | | T |
|---|---|---|---|---|---|---|---|---|
| Yale | | – | | 13 | – | 0 | – | 0 |
| Washington & Jefferson | | – | | 4 | – | 0 | – | 0 |
| Colgate | | – | | 3 | – | 0 | – | 0 |
| Penn | | – | | 15 | – | 1 | – | 0 |
| Cornell | | – | | 10 | – | 1 | – | 0 |
| Harvard | | – | | 10 | – | 1 | – | 0 |
| Princeton | | – | | 12 | – | 2 | – | 0 |
| Penn State | | – | | 5 | – | 1 | – | 0 |
| Tufts | | – | | 8 | – | 2 | – | 0 |
| Navy | | – | | 5 | – | 2 | – | 0 |
| Army | | – | | 3 | – | 1 | – | 1 |
| Swarthmore | | – | | 7 | – | 3 | – | 0 |
| Western Univ. Penn. | | – | | 4 | – | 2 | – | 0 |
| Franklin & Marshall | | – | | 4 | – | 3 | – | 0 |
| Brown | | – | | 4 | – | 4 | – | 2 |
| Bucknell | | – | | 2 | – | 2 | – | 0 |
| Fordham | | – | | 2 | – | 2 | – | 0 |
| Stevens | | – | | 1 | – | 1 | – | 0 |
| Lafayette | | – | | 5 | – | 7 | – | 0 |
| Massachusetts | | – | | 4 | – | 6 | – | 2 |
| Rutgers | | – | | 3 | – | 5 | – | 1 |
| Geneva | | – | | 2 | – | 4 | – | 0 |
| Lehigh | | – | | 3 | – | 6 | – | 0 |
| Wesleyan | | – | | 1 | – | 7 | – | 1 |
| Syracuse | | – | | 0 | – | 8 | – | 1 |
| Drexel | | – | | 0 | – | 1 | – | 0 |
| NYU | | – | | 0 | – | 1 | – | 0 |

The 1892 NYU Violets football team was an American football team that represented New York University as an independent during the 1892 college football season. The Violets compiled an 0–1 record for the season.

== Schedule ==
| Date | Opponent | Site | Result | Source |
|---|---|---|---|---|
| October 12 | at Swarthmore | Whittier Field; Swarthmore, PA | L 0–20 | |
