= 1892 Harvard Crimson football team =

American college football season

1892 Harvard Crimson football
- Conference: Independent
- Record: 10–1
- Head coach: George A. Stewart & George C. Adams (3rd season)
- Captain: Bernard Trafford
- Home stadium: Jarvis Field

1892 Eastern college football independents records
	Conf.			Overall
Team	W	L	T	W		L		T
Yale		–		13	–	0	–	0
Washington & Jefferson		–		4	–	0	–	0
Colgate		–		3	–	0	–	0
Penn		–		15	–	1	–	0
Cornell		–		10	–	1	–	0
Harvard		–		10	–	1	–	0
Princeton		–		12	–	2	–	0
Penn State		–		5	–	1	–	0
Tufts		–		8	–	2	–	0
Navy		–		5	–	2	–	0
Army		–		3	–	1	–	1
Swarthmore		–		7	–	3	–	0
Western Univ. Penn.		–		4	–	2	–	0
Franklin & Marshall		–		4	–	3	–	0
Brown		–		4	–	4	–	2
Bucknell		–		2	–	2	–	0
Fordham		–		2	–	2	–	0
Stevens		–		1	–	1	–	0
Lafayette		–		5	–	7	–	0
Massachusetts		–		4	–	6	–	2
Rutgers		–		3	–	5	–	1
Geneva		–		2	–	4	–	0
Lehigh		–		3	–	6	–	0
Wesleyan		–		1	–	7	–	1
Syracuse		–		0	–	8	–	1
Drexel		–		0	–	1	–	0
NYU		–		0	–	1	–	0

The 1892 Harvard Crimson football team represented Harvard University in the 1892 college football season. The Crimson finished with a 10–1 record. The team won its first 10 games by a combined score of 365 to 36, but lost its final game against Yale by a 6–0 score.

Five Harvard players were selected as consensus All-Americans: end Frank Hallowell, tackle Marshall Newell, guard Bert Waters, center William H. Lewis, and fullback Charley Brewer.

== Schedule ==
Date	Time	Opponent	Site	Result	Attendance	Source
October 1		Dartmouth	Jarvis Field; Cambridge, MA (rivalry)	W 48–0		
October 5		Phillips Exeter	Cambridge, MA	W 62–0		
October 8	3:00 p.m.	Amherst	Jarvis Field; Cambridge, MA	W 26–0	1,500	
October 15	3:30 p.m.	Williams	Jarvis Field; Cambridge, MA	W 55–0	1,500	
October 22		Boston Athletic Association	Jarvis Field; Cambridge, MA	W 40–0	almost 3,000	
October 26		Chicago Athletic Association	Jarvis Field; Cambridge, MA	W 32–0	4,000	
October 29		Amherst	Jarvis Field; Cambridge, MA	W 32–10		
November 2		MIT	Jarvis Field; Cambridge, MA	W 34–0		
November 5		Cornell	Hampden Park; Springfield, MA	W 20–14		
November 8		Boston Athletic Association	Cambridge, MA	W 16–12		
November 19		vs. Yale	Hampden Park; Springfield, MA (rivalry)	L 0–6	20,000	

Harvard unleashing a flying wedge on Yale in the final game of the 1892 season. The formation was subsequently outlawed for safety reasons.
