= Burt Aull =

American football player (1871–1947)

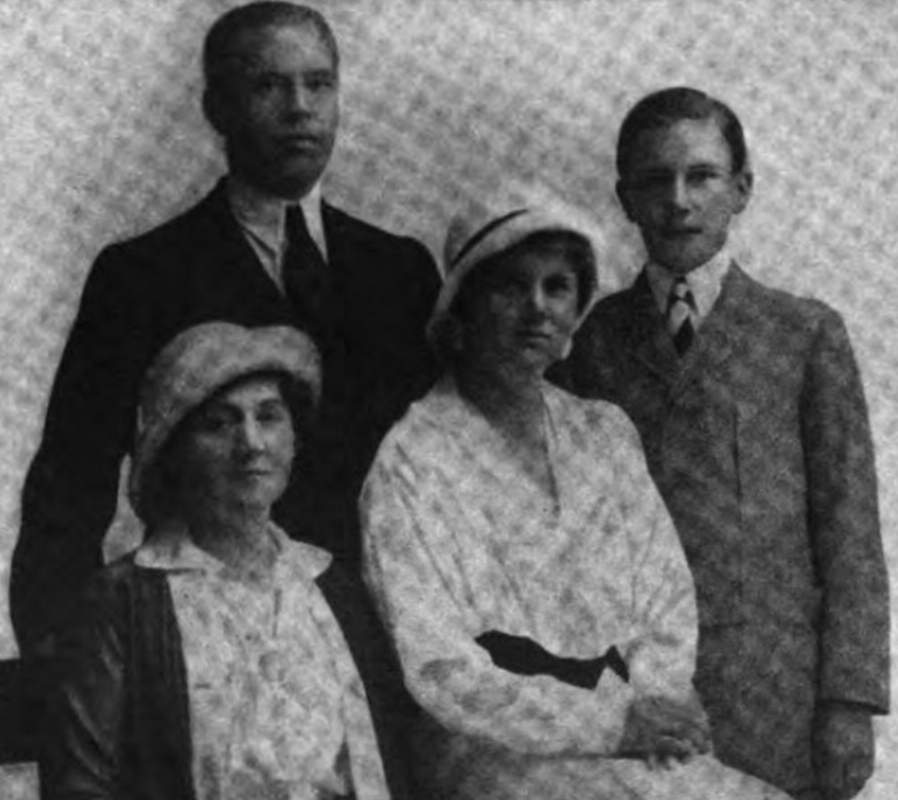
- Burt Aull (top left) pictured with his family circa 1920

Profile
- Position: End

Personal information
- Born: January 29, 1871; Pittsburgh, Pennsylvania, U.S.
- Died: February 1, 1947 (aged 76); Middletown, Ohio, U.S.

Career history
- 1892: Pittsburgh Athletic Club

John Albert "Burt" Aull (January 29, 1871 – February 1, 1947) was an early American football player with the Pittsburgh Athletic Club, prior to the club's hiring of professional football players.

Aull was born to William Ferris and Anna (Martin) Aull in 1871 in Pittsburgh. He was the brother of the team's captain and quarterback, Charley Aull. During a game held on November 12, 1892, against Pittsburgh's rival, the Allegheny Athletic Association, Burt was knocked out of the game in the first half with a severely bruised head. Burt's brother, Charley, was also reportedly injured when he was crushed beneath a pile of several Allegheny players. As a result Charley's back was so wrenched, he had to be carried off the field. The game was of historical significance since it was the first known game to feature a professional player, Pudge Heffelfinger, who was paid $500 by Allegheny to play in the game.

Aull died of a cerebral hemorrhage at Middleton, Ohio in 1947, aged 76.
