= 1892 Geneva Covenanters football team =

American college football season

1892 Geneva Covenanters football
- Conference: Independent
- Record: 2–4
- Head coach: William McCracken (3rd season)
- Captain: Charles Bemies

1892 Eastern college football independents records
	Conf.			Overall
Team	W	L	T	W		L		T
Yale		–		13	–	0	–	0
Washington & Jefferson		–		4	–	0	–	0
Colgate		–		3	–	0	–	0
Penn		–		15	–	1	–	0
Cornell		–		10	–	1	–	0
Harvard		–		10	–	1	–	0
Princeton		–		12	–	2	–	0
Penn State		–		5	–	1	–	0
Tufts		–		8	–	2	–	0
Navy		–		5	–	2	–	0
Army		–		3	–	1	–	1
Swarthmore		–		7	–	3	–	0
Western Univ. Penn.		–		4	–	2	–	0
Franklin & Marshall		–		4	–	3	–	0
Brown		–		4	–	4	–	2
Bucknell		–		2	–	2	–	0
Fordham		–		2	–	2	–	0
Stevens		–		1	–	1	–	0
Lafayette		–		5	–	7	–	0
Massachusetts		–		4	–	6	–	2
Rutgers		–		3	–	5	–	1
Geneva		–		2	–	4	–	0
Lehigh		–		3	–	6	–	0
Wesleyan		–		1	–	7	–	1
Syracuse		–		0	–	8	–	1
Drexel		–		0	–	1	–	0
NYU		–		0	–	1	–	0

The 1892 Geneva Covenanters football team was an American football team that represented Geneva College as an independent during the 1892 college football season. Led by third-year head coach William McCracken, Geneva compiled a record of 2–4. The team's captain was Charles Bemies.

== Schedule ==
Date	Opponent	Site	Result	Attendance	Source
October 10	Westminster (PA)	Beaver Falls, PA	W 42–0		
October 15	Western University of Pennsylvania	Beaver Falls, PA	L 4–6	1,500	
October 22	at Pittsburgh Athletic Club	East End grounds; Pittsburgh, PA	L 6–18	1,000	
October 29	Washington & Jefferson	Beaver Falls, PA	L 10–20		
November 8	Allegheny Athletic Association	Geneva College grounds; Beaver Falls, PA	W 18–2		
November 12	at Washington & Jefferson	College Park; Washington, PA	L 6–50		
