= 1892 Washington & Jefferson football team =

American college football season

1892 Washington & Jefferson football
- Conference: Independent
- Record: 4–0
- Head coach: J. J. Clark (1st season)
- Home stadium: College Park

1892 Eastern college football independents records
	Conf.			Overall
Team	W	L	T	W		L		T
Yale		–		13	–	0	–	0
Washington & Jefferson		–		4	–	0	–	0
Colgate		–		3	–	0	–	0
Penn		–		15	–	1	–	0
Cornell		–		10	–	1	–	0
Harvard		–		10	–	1	–	0
Princeton		–		12	–	2	–	0
Penn State		–		5	–	1	–	0
Tufts		–		8	–	2	–	0
Navy		–		5	–	2	–	0
Army		–		3	–	1	–	1
Swarthmore		–		7	–	3	–	0
Western Univ. Penn.		–		4	–	2	–	0
Franklin & Marshall		–		4	–	3	–	0
Brown		–		4	–	4	–	2
Bucknell		–		2	–	2	–	0
Fordham		–		2	–	2	–	0
Stevens		–		1	–	1	–	0
Lafayette		–		5	–	7	–	0
Massachusetts		–		4	–	6	–	2
Rutgers		–		3	–	5	–	1
Geneva		–		2	–	4	–	0
Lehigh		–		3	–	6	–	0
Wesleyan		–		1	–	7	–	1
Syracuse		–		0	–	8	–	1
Drexel		–		0	–	1	–	0
NYU		–		0	–	1	–	0

The 1892 Washington & Jefferson football team was an American football team that represented Washington & Jefferson College as an independent during the 1892 college football season. Led by J. J. Clark in his first and only year as head coach, the team compiled a record of 4–0.

== Schedule ==
Date	Opponent	Site	Result	Source
October 29	at Geneva	Beaver Falls, PA	W 20–10	
November 5	Western University of Pennsylvania	College Park; Washington, PA	W 18–6	
November 12	Geneva	College Park; Washington, PA	W 50–6	
November 19	at Allegheny Athletic Association	A. A. A. Park; Allegheny, PA	W 8–0	
