= 1892 Massachusetts Aggies football team =

American college football season

1892 Massachusetts Aggies football
- Conference: Independent
- Record: 4–6–2
- Head coach: None
- Home stadium: Alumni Field

1892 Eastern college football independents records
	Conf.			Overall
Team	W	L	T	W		L		T
Yale		–		13	–	0	–	0
Washington & Jefferson		–		4	–	0	–	0
Colgate		–		3	–	0	–	0
Penn		–		15	–	1	–	0
Cornell		–		10	–	1	–	0
Harvard		–		10	–	1	–	0
Princeton		–		12	–	2	–	0
Penn State		–		5	–	1	–	0
Tufts		–		8	–	2	–	0
Navy		–		5	–	2	–	0
Army		–		3	–	1	–	1
Swarthmore		–		7	–	3	–	0
Western Univ. Penn.		–		4	–	2	–	0
Franklin & Marshall		–		4	–	3	–	0
Brown		–		4	–	4	–	2
Bucknell		–		2	–	2	–	0
Fordham		–		2	–	2	–	0
Stevens		–		1	–	1	–	0
Lafayette		–		5	–	7	–	0
Massachusetts		–		4	–	6	–	2
Rutgers		–		3	–	5	–	1
Geneva		–		2	–	4	–	0
Lehigh		–		3	–	6	–	0
Wesleyan		–		1	–	7	–	1
Syracuse		–		0	–	8	–	1
Drexel		–		0	–	1	–	0
NYU		–		0	–	1	–	0

The 1892 Massachusetts Aggies football team represented Massachusetts Agricultural College in the 1892 college football season. The team played its home games at Alumni Field in Amherst, Massachusetts. Massachusetts finished the season with a record of 4–6–2.

== Schedule ==
Note: All scores/opponents sourced from Carlson 1988.

Date	Opponent	Site	Result	Source
September 24	at Trinity (CT)	Hartford, CT	L 0–6	
October 1	Worcester Tech	Alumni Field; Amherst, MA	W 28–10	
October 5	at Amherst	Pratt Field; Amherst, MA	L 10–58	
October 7	Mount Hermon	Alumni Field; Amherst, MA	T 10–10	
October 11	Amherst	Alumni Field; Amherst, MA	L 0–4	
October 15	at Worcester Tech	Worcester, MA	W 18–4	
October 19	Williston Seminary	Alumni Field; Amherst, MA	W 22–12	
October 25	at Amherst	Pratt Field; Amherst, MA	L 4–22	
October 29	Boston University	Alumni Field; Amherst, MA	W 62–0	
November 3	at Mount Hermon	Mount Hermon, MA	T 12–12	
November 7	Springfield YMCA	Alumni Field; Amherst, MA	L 16–18	
November 14	at Harvard freshmen	Cambridge, MA	L 12–46	
