= 1892 Drexel Dragons football team =

American college football season

1892 Drexel Dragons football
- Conference: Independent
- Record: 0–1
- Head coach: None
- Captain: H. L. Catanach
- Home stadium: West Philadelphia YMCA

1892 Eastern college football independents records
| | Conf. | | | Overall |
| Team | W | L | T | W | | L | | T |
|---|---|---|---|---|---|---|---|---|
| Yale | | – | | 13 | – | 0 | – | 0 |
| Washington & Jefferson | | – | | 4 | – | 0 | – | 0 |
| Colgate | | – | | 3 | – | 0 | – | 0 |
| Penn | | – | | 15 | – | 1 | – | 0 |
| Cornell | | – | | 10 | – | 1 | – | 0 |
| Harvard | | – | | 10 | – | 1 | – | 0 |
| Princeton | | – | | 12 | – | 2 | – | 0 |
| Penn State | | – | | 5 | – | 1 | – | 0 |
| Tufts | | – | | 8 | – | 2 | – | 0 |
| Navy | | – | | 5 | – | 2 | – | 0 |
| Army | | – | | 3 | – | 1 | – | 1 |
| Swarthmore | | – | | 7 | – | 3 | – | 0 |
| Western Univ. Penn. | | – | | 4 | – | 2 | – | 0 |
| Franklin & Marshall | | – | | 4 | – | 3 | – | 0 |
| Brown | | – | | 4 | – | 4 | – | 2 |
| Bucknell | | – | | 2 | – | 2 | – | 0 |
| Fordham | | – | | 2 | – | 2 | – | 0 |
| Stevens | | – | | 1 | – | 1 | – | 0 |
| Lafayette | | – | | 5 | – | 7 | – | 0 |
| Massachusetts | | – | | 4 | – | 6 | – | 2 |
| Rutgers | | – | | 3 | – | 5 | – | 1 |
| Geneva | | – | | 2 | – | 4 | – | 0 |
| Lehigh | | – | | 3 | – | 6 | – | 0 |
| Wesleyan | | – | | 1 | – | 7 | – | 1 |
| Syracuse | | – | | 0 | – | 8 | – | 1 |
| Drexel | | – | | 0 | – | 1 | – | 0 |
| NYU | | – | | 0 | – | 1 | – | 0 |

The 1892 Drexel Dragons football team represented the Drexel Institute—now known as Drexel University–as an independent during the 1892 college football season. The team did not have a head coach.

== Schedule ==
| Date | Opponent | Site | Result |
|---|---|---|---|
| October 15 | Rugby Academy | Y.M.C.A.; Philadelphia, PA | L 4–10 |

== Roster ==
1892 Drexel Dragons football team roster
Players
Coaches
Offense

| Pos. | # | Name | Class |
|---|---|---|---|
| TE | | Dickens |
| OT | | Rose |
| G | | H. L. Catanach (C) |
| C | | McGlaughlin |
| G | | Nowlan |
| OT | | Bing |
| TE | | Kelly |
| QB | | Peck |
| HB | | Loper |
| HB | | William Stanton | Fr |
| FB | | Weaver |

Defense

| Pos. | # | Name | Class |

Special teams

| Pos. | # | Name | Class |

Head coach

- No coach

Coordinators/assistant coaches

Legend

- (C) Team captain
- (S) Suspended
- (I) Ineligible
- Injured
- Redshirt

Roster
Last update: 17 October 2018
