= 1892 Swarthmore Quakers football team =

American college football season

1892 Swarthmore Quakers football
- Conference: Independent
- Record: 7–3
- Head coach: Jacob K. Shell (5th season)
- Home stadium: Whittier Field

1892 Eastern college football independents records
	Conf.			Overall
Team	W	L	T	W		L		T
Yale		–		13	–	0	–	0
Washington & Jefferson		–		4	–	0	–	0
Colgate		–		3	–	0	–	0
Penn		–		15	–	1	–	0
Cornell		–		10	–	1	–	0
Harvard		–		10	–	1	–	0
Princeton		–		12	–	2	–	0
Penn State		–		5	–	1	–	0
Tufts		–		8	–	2	–	0
Navy		–		5	–	2	–	0
Army		–		3	–	1	–	1
Swarthmore		–		7	–	3	–	0
Western Univ. Penn.		–		4	–	2	–	0
Franklin & Marshall		–		4	–	3	–	0
Brown		–		4	–	4	–	2
Bucknell		–		2	–	2	–	0
Fordham		–		2	–	2	–	0
Stevens		–		1	–	1	–	0
Lafayette		–		5	–	7	–	0
Massachusetts		–		4	–	6	–	2
Rutgers		–		3	–	5	–	1
Geneva		–		2	–	4	–	0
Lehigh		–		3	–	6	–	0
Wesleyan		–		1	–	7	–	1
Syracuse		–		0	–	8	–	1
Drexel		–		0	–	1	–	0
NYU		–		0	–	1	–	0

The 1892 Swarthmore Quakers football team was an American football team that represented Swarthmore College as an independent during the 1892 college football season. The team compiled a 7–3 record and outscored opponents by a total of 166 to 91. Jacob K. Shell was the head coach.

Fullback George H. Brooke was the team captain. Other key players included quarterback Charles G. Hodge, halfbacks Kent W. Hughes and Samuel C. Palmer, and ends A. K. White and Edwin P. Bond.

== Schedule ==
Date	Opponent	Site	Result	Attendance	Source
September 28	Penn	Whittier Field; Swarthmore, PA	L 0–22		
October 1	at Lehigh	Bethlehem, PA	L 0–51		
October 12	NYU	Whittier Field; Swarthmore, PA	W 26–0		
October 14	Swarthmore alumni	Whittier Field; Swarthmore, PA	W 20–0		
October 15	All-Collegians	Whittier Field; Swarthmore, PA	W 62–0		
October 21	at Franklin & Marshall	Lancaster, PA	L 0–10		
October 22	at Dickinson	Carlisle, PA	W 18–0		
October 29	at Pennsylvania Military	Chester, PA	W 8–4		
November 19	Haverford	Whittier Field; Swarthmore, PA (rivalry)	W 22–4		
November 24	at Warren Athletic Club	Front and Union streets; Wilmington, DE	W 10–0	800	
