= 1892 Lafayette football team =

American college football season

1892 Lafayette football
- Conference: Independent
- Record: 5–7
- Head coach: Wallace Moyle (2nd season)
- Captain: Gustave Voight
- Home stadium: The Quad

1892 Eastern college football independents records
| | Conf. | | | Overall |
| Team | W | L | T | W | | L | | T |
|---|---|---|---|---|---|---|---|---|
| Yale | | – | | 13 | – | 0 | – | 0 |
| Washington & Jefferson | | – | | 4 | – | 0 | – | 0 |
| Colgate | | – | | 3 | – | 0 | – | 0 |
| Penn | | – | | 15 | – | 1 | – | 0 |
| Cornell | | – | | 10 | – | 1 | – | 0 |
| Harvard | | – | | 10 | – | 1 | – | 0 |
| Princeton | | – | | 12 | – | 2 | – | 0 |
| Penn State | | – | | 5 | – | 1 | – | 0 |
| Tufts | | – | | 8 | – | 2 | – | 0 |
| Navy | | – | | 5 | – | 2 | – | 0 |
| Army | | – | | 3 | – | 1 | – | 1 |
| Swarthmore | | – | | 7 | – | 3 | – | 0 |
| Western Univ. Penn. | | – | | 4 | – | 2 | – | 0 |
| Franklin & Marshall | | – | | 4 | – | 3 | – | 0 |
| Brown | | – | | 4 | – | 4 | – | 2 |
| Bucknell | | – | | 2 | – | 2 | – | 0 |
| Fordham | | – | | 2 | – | 2 | – | 0 |
| Stevens | | – | | 1 | – | 1 | – | 0 |
| Lafayette | | – | | 5 | – | 7 | – | 0 |
| Massachusetts | | – | | 4 | – | 6 | – | 2 |
| Rutgers | | – | | 3 | – | 5 | – | 1 |
| Geneva | | – | | 2 | – | 4 | – | 0 |
| Lehigh | | – | | 3 | – | 6 | – | 0 |
| Wesleyan | | – | | 1 | – | 7 | – | 1 |
| Syracuse | | – | | 0 | – | 8 | – | 1 |
| Drexel | | – | | 0 | – | 1 | – | 0 |
| NYU | | – | | 0 | – | 1 | – | 0 |

The 1892 Lafayette football team was an American football team that represented Lafayette College as an independent during the 1892 college football season. In its second and final year under head coach Wallace Moyle, the team compiled a 5–7 record and was outscored by a total of 139 to 126. Gustave Voight was the team captain. The team played its home games on The Quad in Easton, Pennsylvania.

== Schedule ==
| Date | Opponent | Site | Result |
|---|---|---|---|
| October 1 | Temperance A.A. | | W 30–0 |
| October 8 | at Princeton | | L 0–40 |
| October 15 | Rutgers | | L 8–16 |
| October 21 | at Columbia A.A. | | W 10–0 |
| October 22 | at Navy | | L 4–22 |
| October 26 | Penn | | L 6–8 |
| October 29 | at Rutgers | | W 24–10 |
| November 5 | Lehigh | | W 4–0 |
| November 12 | at Orange Athletic Club | | W 30–0 |
| November 16 | at Penn | University Athletic Grounds; Philadelphia, PA | L 4–10 |
| November 19 | at Lehigh | | L 6–15 |
| November 23 | vs. Penn State | Wilkes-Barre, PA | L 0–18 |
