= East Orange Stadium =

Football stadium formerly located in East Orange, New Jersey

Coordinates: 40.7700438°N 74.2099264°W

East Orange Stadium was a football stadium located at the intersection of North Clinton St. and Park Avenue in East Orange, New Jersey. The field was used for practice and home games by the Orange Athletic Club, which later evolved into the Orange Tornadoes of the National Football League prior to the opening of Knights of Columbus Stadium in 1926. Paul Robeson Stadium, which is used by East Orange Campus High School athletics, occupies the space that was once used for the field.

Preceded by East Orange Oval	Home of the Orange A.C.- Orange/Newark Tornadoes ??? – 1925	Succeeded by Knights of Columbus Stadium
