= 1892 Colorado Silver and Gold football team =

American college football season

1892 Colorado Silver and Gold football
- Conference: Independent
- Record: 3–2
- Head coach: None
- Captain: Pat Carney
- Home stadium: Campus Fields

1892 Colorado Football Association standings
	Conf.			Overall
Team	W	L	T	W		L		T
Colorado Mines $		–				–
Colorado		–		3	–	2	–	0
Colorado Agricultural		–		2	–	2	–	0
$ – Conference champion

The 1892 Colorado Silver and Gold Football Team was an American football team that represented University of Colorado as an independent during the 1892 college football season. The team has no head coach and compiled a record of 3–2, which marked the program's first winning season.

== Schedule ==
Date	Opponent	Site	Result
October 22	at Denver	Denver, CO	W 46–0
November 8	Denver	Boulder, CO	W 46–0
November 12	Colorado Mines	Boulder, CO	L 10–16
November 19	at Denver Athletic Club	Denver, CO	L 6–42
February 10, 1893	at Colorado Agricultural	Fort Collins, CO (rivalry)	W 70–6
