= 1892 Western University of Pennsylvania football team =

American college football season

1892 Western University of Pennsylvania football
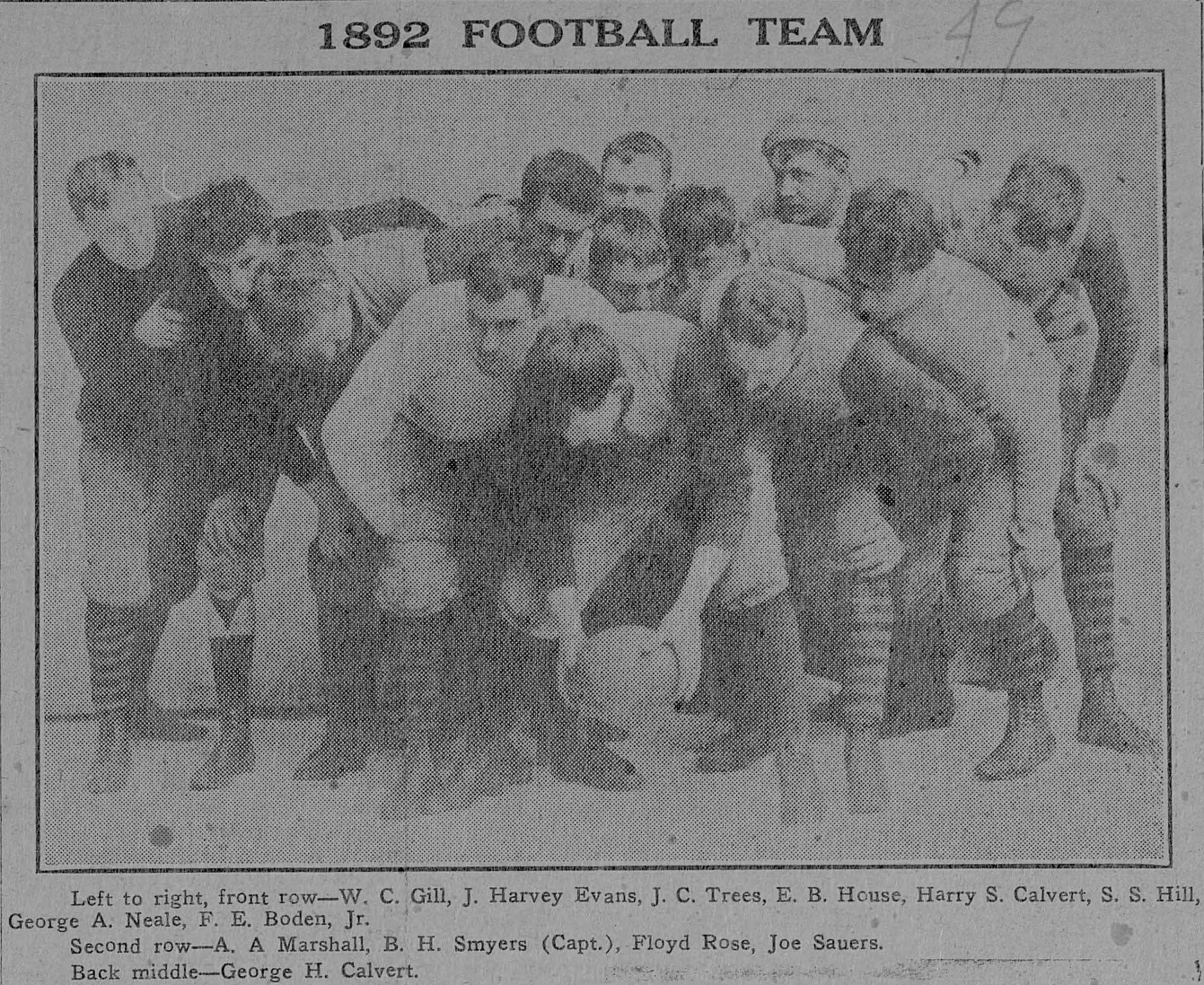
- Conference: Independent
- Record: 4–2
- Head coach: None
- Captain: Bert Smyers

1892 Eastern college football independents records
	Conf.			Overall
Team	W	L	T	W		L		T
Yale		–		13	–	0	–	0
Washington & Jefferson		–		4	–	0	–	0
Colgate		–		3	–	0	–	0
Penn		–		15	–	1	–	0
Cornell		–		10	–	1	–	0
Harvard		–		10	–	1	–	0
Princeton		–		12	–	2	–	0
Penn State		–		5	–	1	–	0
Tufts		–		8	–	2	–	0
Navy		–		5	–	2	–	0
Army		–		3	–	1	–	1
Swarthmore		–		7	–	3	–	0
Western Univ. Penn.		–		4	–	2	–	0
Franklin & Marshall		–		4	–	3	–	0
Brown		–		4	–	4	–	2
Bucknell		–		2	–	2	–	0
Fordham		–		2	–	2	–	0
Stevens		–		1	–	1	–	0
Lafayette		–		5	–	7	–	0
Massachusetts		–		4	–	6	–	2
Rutgers		–		3	–	5	–	1
Geneva		–		2	–	4	–	0
Lehigh		–		3	–	6	–	0
Wesleyan		–		1	–	7	–	1
Syracuse		–		0	–	8	–	1
Drexel		–		0	–	1	–	0
NYU		–		0	–	1	–	0

The 1892 Western University of Pennsylvania football team was an American football team that represented the Western University of Pennsylvania (now known as the University of Pittsburgh) as an independent during the 1892 college football season.

== Schedule ==
Date	Opponent	Site	Result	Attendance	Source
October 1	at East End Gymnastics	Pittsburgh, PA	L 0–16	500–2,500	
October 8	at Washington & Jefferson	College Park; Washington, PA	cancelled		
October 15	at Geneva	Beaver Falls, PA	W 6–4	1,500	
October 21	at Kiskiminitas School	Loyalhanna, PA	W 12–0		
October 22	at Indiana Normal	Indiana, PA	W 8–6		
October 29	at Greensburg Athletic Association	Offutt Field; Greensburg, PA	W 6–2		
November 5	at Washington & Jefferson	College Park; Washington, PA	L 6–18		

== Season recap ==
The Western University of Pennsylvania Athletic Association, with halfback William Gill as president, set up a seven-game schedule for the 1892 football season. The team, led by captain Bert Smyers, compiled a 4–2 record and was outscored by a total of 46 to 38.

== Game summaries ==
=== At East End Gymnasium ===
WUP at East End Gymnasium Club

Team	1	2	Total
WUP	0	0	0
• East End Gyms	16	0	16

- Date: October 1, 1892
- Location: East End Grounds (Liberty Park), Pittsburgh
- Referee: Blunt (Lehigh)

The opening game was against the East End Gymnasium Club team. The Pittsburgh Dispatch claimed 2500 fans watched the struggle at the East End field. The Pittsburgh Press had the crowd size at 500.

The fleet backs of East End (Valentine, Martin, Proctor and Aull) were able to skirt the ends of the WUP defense and score three touchdowns in the first half. The East End Club outweighed the WUP team by at least 10 pounds per man, but the Western University boys played hard and kept the score a respectable 16–0. The defensive play of Neale and DuBarry for the WUP allowed them to not give up a second-half score.

The opening-day lineup for the WUP team was Meckling (center), Thomas (right guard), Samuel Hill (left guard), Joe Trees (right tackle), George Neale (left tackle), Ted Boden (right end), Dudley DuBarry (left end), J. Boyce (right halfback), Floyd Rose (left halfback), Gardner Steele (fullback) and Bert Smyers (captain/quarterback).

=== At Washington & Jefferson (cancelled) ===
The second game was scheduled against Washington & Jefferson. This game was cancelled due to the death of Washington & Jefferson player William Lyons. He was injured in practice and never recovered.

=== At Geneva ===
WUP at Geneva

Team	1	2	Total
• WUP	0	6	6
Geneva	0	4	4

- Date: October 15, 1892
- Location: Geneva Grounds, Beaver Falls, PA
- Game attendance: 1,500
- Referee: DuBarry

On October 15 in Beaver Falls the WUP narrowly defeated the Geneva Covenanters. After a scoreless first half, the Covies finally broke through the WUP defense and scored a touchdown with twelve minutes left to play. The goal kick after was unsuccessful. The WUP offense then advanced the ball down the field and Captain Bert Smyers scored with five minutes left on the clock. Thomas booted the goal after to put the Western University ahead 6–4. The frustrated partisan Geneva crowd of about 1500 proceeded to get rowdy. They started to interfere with the game action and caused havoc for the officials in the final five minutes. In spite of the late game commotion, the Western University boys managed to go home with a 6–4 victory.

The WUP lineup for the Geneva game was Meckling (center), Thomas (right guard), Samuel Hill (left guard), Joe Trees (right tackle), George Neale (left tackle), Ted Boden (left end), Harvey Evans (right end), J. Boyce (left halfback), William Gill (right halfback), George Calvert (fullback) and Bert Smyers (captain/quarterback).

=== At Kiskiminitas School ===
On October 21 the WUP football team stopped in Loyalhanna, Pennsylvania, to play Kiskiminetas as a warmup game prior to playing Indiana Normal. The WUP squad managed to secure a 12–0 victory in easy fashion and proceeded to Indiana, Pa. for a game the very next day.

=== At Indiana Normal ===
WUP at Indiana Normal

Team	1	2	Total
• WUP	4	4	8
Indiana Normal	0	6	6

- Date: October 22, 1892
- Location: Normal Grounds, Indiana, PA

On October 22 the football elevens of the WUP and Indiana Normal squared off in Indiana, Pa. . The offense of each team was able to advance the ball but no scoring occurred until twenty minutes into the game. The WUP backs, Gill and Calvert, gained yards and finally the Western University scored a touchdown. Boden missed the goal after and the halftime score stood at 4–0 in favor of the WUP.

The WUP scored another touchdown early in the second half but again Boden failed on the goal kick. Then the Normal offense led by Fiscus and Campbell proceeded to march down the field and score a touchdown. Campbell kicked the goal after and the final score read 8–6 in favor of Western University of Pennsylvania.

The game was fierce and injuries occurred. One of the Calvert boys had a concussion.

The WUP lineup for the Indiana Normal game was Meckling (center), Samuel Hill (left guard), Harry Calvert (right guard), Joe Trees (right tackle), George Neale (left tackle), Harvey Evans (right end), Thomas (left end), William Gill (right halfback), George Calvert (left halfback), Ted Boden (fullback) and Bert Smyers (captain/quarterback).

=== At Greensburg Athletic Association ===
WUP at Greensburg AA

Team	1	2	Total
• WUP	4	4	8
Greensburg AA	0	6	6

- Date: October 29, 1892
- Location: Offutt Field, Greensburg, PA
- Referee: Aull

On October 29 the game of football between the Western University and the Greensburg Athletic Association team played on the Greensburg field was a defensive struggle. The WUP left end Evans recovered a fumble by Bovard of Greensburg to score a touchdown late in the first half. The goal kick by Neale was good and the score at halftime stood WUP 6 – Greensburg 0.

The second half was a continuation of the battle of defenses. The Greensburg eleven managed a safety late in the game for 2 points to make the final score 6–2 in favor of the Western University eleven.

The revised WUP lineup for the Greensburg game was Mechling (center), Edward House (right guard), Samuel Hill (left guard), George Neale (left tackle), Frank Rhea (right tackle), Harvey Evans (left end), Ted Boden (right end), William Gill (left halfback), Joe Sauers (right halfback), Thomas (fullback) and Bert Smyers (quarterback).

=== At Washington & Jefferson ===
WUP at W & J

Team	1	2	Total
WUP	6	0	6
• W & J	12	6	18

- Date: November 5, 1892
- Location: College Park, Washington, PA
- Referee: Hamilton (Princeton)

The Western University eleven closed their 1892 season with a trip to Washington, Pennsylvania, to battle Washington & Jefferson. Six minutes into the game, the WUP fumbled and Fiscus recovered for the Washington & Jefferson and scampered for a touchdown. Rhen kicked the goal after and Washington & Jefferson led 6–0. The WUP offense advanced the ball downfield, but the Washington & Jefferson defense stiffened. The W&J offense again moved the ball, but fumbled. WUP left end Boden recovered the pigskin, and ran into the end zone for the score. Boden also kicked the goal after to tie the game. Two plays later Freeman Clark, W & J halfback, plowed through the WUP defense and scored. Rhen again kicked the goal after to put Washington & Jefferson ahead 12–6. The WUP defense had to make a goal line stand to keep the score 12–6 at halftime.

Early in the second half, Washington & Jefferson scored on a run by Aiken and Rhen came through with the goal after to make the score 18–6. The rest of the game was a defensive struggle, with Washington & Jefferson again near the goal line as time expired.

The WUP lineup for the Washington & Jefferson game was Mechling (center), Edward House (left guard), Samuel Hill (right guard), George Neale (left tackle), Joe Trees (right tackle), Harvey Evans (right end), Ted Boden (left end), William Gill (right halfback), Joe Sauers (left halfback), Thomas (fullback) and Bert Smyers (quarterback).

== Roster ==
The roster of the 1892 Western University of Pennsylvania football team:

- Bert Smyers – (quarterback/captain), the founder of WUP football, graduated in 1893 with a Bachelor of Arts degree. By 1917 he was the vice president of the Pittsburgh Trust Company, treasurer of the General Alumni Association and a member of the Athletic Council. He later practiced law in Pittsburgh.
- R. C. Brown (manager) received his Civil Engineering degree in 1894.
- Dr. Samuel S. Hill (left guard) received his Doctor of Medicine degree in 1894 and became the Superintendent of the State Asylum in Wernersville, Pennsylvania.
- Joe Trees (right tackle) received his Mechanical Engineering degree in 1895. Mr. Trees was WUP's first scholarship player. He was recruited from Indiana Normal. He struck it rich in the oil business and was most generous to his alma mater. He donated the money for the original Trees Gymnasium and Trees Field. Presently two facilities on campus bear his name – Trees Hall and Trees Field.
- George Neale (left tackle) received his Associate College degree in 1895.
- J. Harvey Evans (right end) received his Engineering degree in 1895. He was the Assistant Treasurer of the Union Trust Company in Pittsburgh.
- Dudley D. DuBarry (left end) graduated with an Associate Engineering degree in 1895. He also played on the 1890 team and part of the State College game in 1893. He worked for the American Steel and Wire Company in Pittsburgh.
- Frederick E. Boden – (right halfback) graduated with an Associate Engineering degree in 1892.
- Floyd Rose – (left halfback) was a three sport star at WUP – baseball, track and football. He received his degree from the college in 1896 and earned a degree in metallurgical engineering in 1911. He was president of Floyd Rose & Company, consulting engineers, in Pittsburgh.
- Gardner Steele – (fullback) attended school three years but did not graduate. He was a sprinter and co-held the 100 yd dash record of 10.5 seconds until 1915. He was a successful oil operator and made a fortune in the Southwestern fields.
- Harry S. Calvert – (right guard) received his Bachelor of Arts degree in 1893 and his master's degree in 1895. He was the president of the Elyria Enameled Products Company of Pittsburgh.
- George H. Calvert – (fullback) graduated with a degree in civil engineering in 1893 and later studied law, earning his L.L.B. in 1897. He set up practice in Pittsburgh.
- William Gill – (right halfback) was also a sprinter and held the 440 record (51 seconds) for some years. He graduated in 1893 with a Bachelor of Arts degree and earned his master's degree in 1896. He obtained his law degree and settled in Pittsburgh.
- Edward B. House – (left guard) attended WUP only one year before transferring to the University of Michigan. He graduated with an Electrical Engineering degree in 1896 and later taught at the State Agricultural College in Fort Collins, Colorado.
- Albert A. Marshall (lineman) received his Bachelor of Philosophy degree in 1894.
- Joe Sauers (left halfback) received his Associate College degree in 1892.
- J.W. Boyce (halfback) received his Medical degree in 1892.
- Meckling (center)
- Thomas (right guard, fullback)
