= 1892 Greensburg Athletic Association season =

American football team season

1892 Greensburg Athletic Association football
- Record: Unknown
- Captain: Richard Coulter Jr.
- Home field: Athletic Park

The 1892 Greensburg Athletic Association season was their third season in existence. The team's record for this season is largely unknown. Richard Coulter Jr. was team captain.

== Schedule ==
| Date | Opponent | Result | Source |
|---|---|---|---|
| October 8 | at Pittsburgh Athletic Club | L 0–28 | |
| October 21 | at Uniontown | W 28–0 | |
| October 29 | Western University of Pennsylvania | L 2–6 | |
