= 1892 Syracuse Orangemen football team =

American college football season

1892 Syracuse Orangemen football
- Conference: Independent
- Record: 0–8–1
- Head coach: Jordan C. Wells (1st season)
- Captain: Sherman Rouse
- Home stadium: Star Park

1892 Eastern college football independents records
	Conf.			Overall
Team	W	L	T	W		L		T
Yale		–		13	–	0	–	0
Washington & Jefferson		–		4	–	0	–	0
Colgate		–		3	–	0	–	0
Penn		–		15	–	1	–	0
Cornell		–		10	–	1	–	0
Harvard		–		10	–	1	–	0
Princeton		–		12	–	2	–	0
Penn State		–		5	–	1	–	0
Tufts		–		8	–	2	–	0
Navy		–		5	–	2	–	0
Army		–		3	–	1	–	1
Swarthmore		–		7	–	3	–	0
Western Univ. Penn.		–		4	–	2	–	0
Franklin & Marshall		–		4	–	3	–	0
Brown		–		4	–	4	–	2
Bucknell		–		2	–	2	–	0
Fordham		–		2	–	2	–	0
Stevens		–		1	–	1	–	0
Lafayette		–		5	–	7	–	0
Massachusetts		–		4	–	6	–	2
Rutgers		–		3	–	5	–	1
Geneva		–		2	–	4	–	0
Lehigh		–		3	–	6	–	0
Wesleyan		–		1	–	7	–	1
Syracuse		–		0	–	8	–	1
Drexel		–		0	–	1	–	0
NYU		–		0	–	1	–	0

The 1892 Syracuse Orangemen football team represented Syracuse University as an independent during the 1892 college football season. The head coach was Jordan C. Wells, coaching his first season with the Orangemen.

== Schedule ==
Date	Opponent	Site	Result	Attendance
September 28	at Cornell	Ithaca, NY	L 0–58	
October 12	Syracuse Athletic Association	Syracuse, NY	L 0–24	500
October 21	Syracuse Athletic Association	Syracuse, NY	L 4–18	1,000
October 29	Union (NY)	Syracuse, NY	L 0–52	
November 5	Hamilton	Syracuse, NY	L 0–12	
November 9	Syracuse Athletic Association	Syracuse, NY	T 0–0	1,000
November 12	at Rochester	Rochester, NY	L 0–22	
November 15	Syracuse Athletic Association	Syracuse, NY	L 0–4	
November 19	St. John's Military Academy	Syracuse, NY	L 0–28	
