= 1892 Penn Quakers football team =

American college football season

1892 Penn Quakers football
- Conference: Independent
- Record: 15–1
- Head coach: George Washington Woodruff (1st season)
- Captain: Charles Schoff
- Home stadium: University Athletic Grounds

1892 Eastern college football independents records
	Conf.			Overall
Team	W	L	T	W		L		T
Yale		–		13	–	0	–	0
Washington & Jefferson		–		4	–	0	–	0
Colgate		–		3	–	0	–	0
Penn		–		15	–	1	–	0
Cornell		–		10	–	1	–	0
Harvard		–		10	–	1	–	0
Princeton		–		12	–	2	–	0
Penn State		–		5	–	1	–	0
Tufts		–		8	–	2	–	0
Navy		–		5	–	2	–	0
Army		–		3	–	1	–	1
Swarthmore		–		7	–	3	–	0
Western Univ. Penn.		–		4	–	2	–	0
Franklin & Marshall		–		4	–	3	–	0
Brown		–		4	–	4	–	2
Bucknell		–		2	–	2	–	0
Fordham		–		2	–	2	–	0
Stevens		–		1	–	1	–	0
Lafayette		–		5	–	7	–	0
Massachusetts		–		4	–	6	–	2
Rutgers		–		3	–	5	–	1
Geneva		–		2	–	4	–	0
Lehigh		–		3	–	6	–	0
Wesleyan		–		1	–	7	–	1
Syracuse		–		0	–	8	–	1
Drexel		–		0	–	1	–	0
NYU		–		0	–	1	–	0

The 1892 Penn Quakers football team represented the University of Pennsylvania in the 1892 college football season. The Quakers finished with a 15–1 record in their first year under head coach and College Football Hall of Fame inductee, George Washington Woodruff. Significant games included victories over Penn State (20–0), Navy (16–0), Lafayette (8–6 and 10–4), and Princeton (6–4), and its sole loss to undefeated national champion Yale (28–0). The 1892 Penn team outscored its opponents by a combined total of 405 to 52. Penn halfback Harry Thayer was selected by both Walter Camp and Caspar Whitney as a first-team player on the 1892 College Football All-America Team.

== Schedule ==
Date	Opponent	Site	Result	Attendance	Source
September 28	at Swarthmore	Swarthmore, PA	W 22–0		
October 1	Penn State	University Athletic Grounds; Philadelphia, PA	W 20–0		
October 5	Haverford	Philadelphia, PA	W 56–0		
October 11	at Virginia	Charlottesville, VA	W 32–0		
October 12	at Navy	Worden Field; Annapolis, MD	W 16–0		
October 15	at Crescent Athletic Club	Eastern Park; Brooklyn, NY	W 23–0		
October 19	Dickinson	Philadelphia, PA	W 78–0		
October 21	Williams	University Athletic Grounds; Philadelphia, PA	W 50–0	3,000	
October 22	Franklin & Marshall	University Athletic Grounds; Philadelphia, PA	W 34–0		
October 26	at Lafayette	Easton, PA	W 8–6		
October 29	Chicago Athletic Association	University Athletic Grounds; Philadelphia, PA	W 12–10	> 3,000	
November 5	Princeton	Germantown Cricket Club; Germantown, PA (rivalry)	W 6–4	15,000	
November 8	Lehigh	University Athletic Grounds; Philadelphia, PA	W 4–0		
November 12	vs. Yale	Manhattan Field; New York, NY	L 0–28	> 8,000	
November 16	Lafayette	University Athletic Grounds; Philadelphia, PA	W 10–4		
November 24	Wesleyan	Philadelphia, PA	W 34–0		
