= 1892–93 Colorado Agricultural football team =

American college football season

1892–93 Colorado Agricultural football
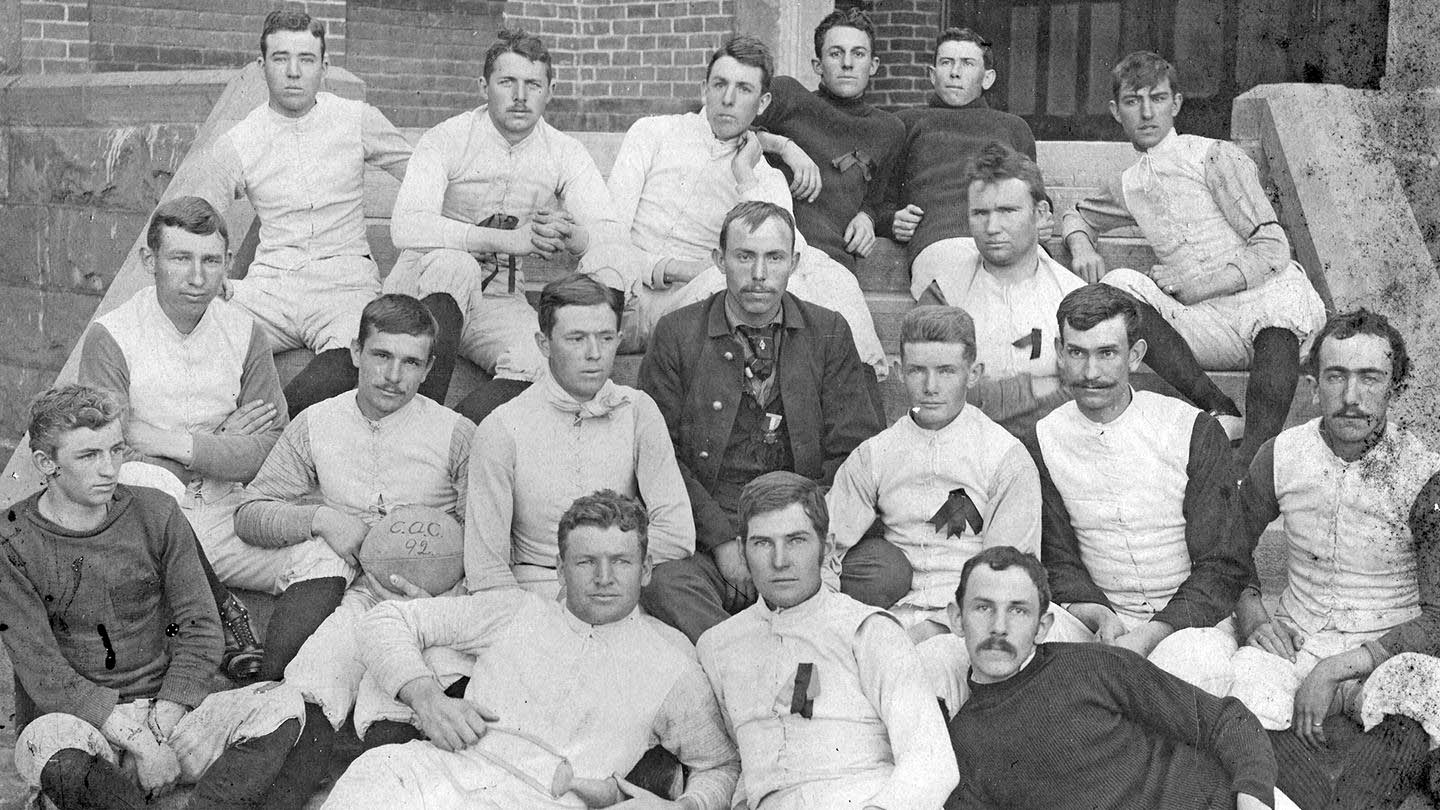
- Conference: Independent
- Record: 2–2
- Head coach: None
- Home stadium: Campus fields

1892 Colorado Football Association standings
	Conf.			Overall
Team	W	L	T	W		L		T
Colorado Mines $		–				–
Colorado		–		3	–	2	–	0
Colorado Agricultural		–		2	–	2	–	0
$ – Conference champion

The 1892–93 Colorado Agricultural CACs football team represented Colorado Agricultural College (now known as Colorado State University) in its inaugural season during the 1892–93 academic year, with all games taking place in the early months of 1893. The team compiled a 2–2 record and was outscored by a total of 98 to 54. The team had no coach.

On December 12, 1892, a student named F.O. Congdon and 18 of the other 179 students enrolled at Colorado Agricultural College at the time decided to form the school's first American football team and compete with other schools in the area. The team's nickname (that would later be changed to Aggies, then Rams) was the CACs, the school's acronym (Colorado Agricultural College).

Following Christmas break, the team found some men at a small private hybrid college/high school named Longmont Academy who would challenge the CAC team to play the first game in each school's history. The game took place on January 7, 1893, in Longmont, Colorado. Earlier that morning, Colorado Agricultural players and fans bought orange and green ribbons at a dry goods store in Longmont, choosing the school's colors.

== Schedule ==
Date	Opponent	Site	Result	Source
January 7, 1893	at Longmont Academy	Longmont, CO	L 8–12	
January 28, 1893	Longmont Academy	Fort Collins, CO	W 24–16	
February 11, 1893	Colorado	Fort Collins, CO (rivalry)	L 6–70	
April 1, 1893	at Colorado State Normal	Greeley, CO	W 16–0	
