= Charley Aull =

American football player (1869–1958)

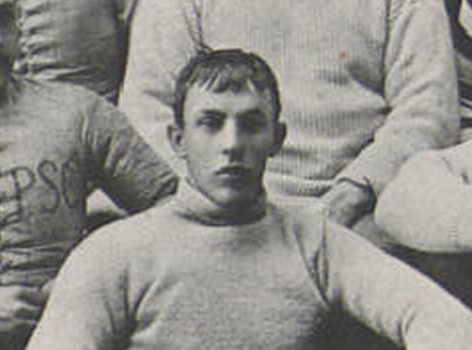
- Aull at Penn State in 1890

Profile
- Position: Quarterback

Personal information
- Born: September 5, 1869; Pittsburgh, Pennsylvania, US
- Died: June 28, 1958 (aged 88); Butler County, Ohio, US
- Listed height: 5 ft 9 in (1.75 m)
- Listed weight: 160 lb (73 kg)

Career information
- College: Penn State

Career history
- 1892–1896: Pittsburgh Athletic Club

Charles Elmer Aull (September 5, 1869 – June 28, 1958) was an early professional football player. He played professionally for the Pittsburgh Athletic Club (PAC). He also played college football from 1889 until 1891 for the Penn State Nittany Lions. He was born in Pittsburgh in 1869. He died in Ohio in 1958.

== Professional career ==
Aull served as the team's quarterback and captain for the 1892 season. His brother Burt also played on the team. Charley was also accused of bringing in a ringer for the club against its rival the Allegheny Athletic Association. That year Aull stated that he met an old friend named "Stayer," on the street prior to the team's October 21 game against Allegheny. Since Pittsburgh was in need of replacement at center, "Stayer" agreed to replace the injured regular player. A week after the game, it was disclosed that "Stayer" actually was A.C. Read, the captain of the Penn State football team. Although no one could prove that Read actually had been paid, and Aull had not tried to present him as a PAC member, Allegheny hired under the table Pudge Heffelfinger, a college star formerly from Yale, for $500, to play for the club in a November 21 rematch. This game made Heffelfinger the first recorded professional football player. During the rematch, Aull received an injury when he was crushed beneath a pile of several Allegheny players. As a result, Charley's back was so wrenched he had to be carried off the field. His brother Burt was also injured during the game after receiving a fierce blow to the head.

In 1893, Charley was renamed the team's captain. On October 7, 1893, he was injured in a 10–0 PAC win over Western University (today the University of Pittsburgh). He was out of the PAC lineup for two weeks with a swollen lip.

In 1894, Aull stepped away from the game and was succeeded at quarterback by George S. Proctor, previously one of the team's halfbacks. Aull did, however, enter a game on November 6 after Proctor was ejected for slugging. Aull returned as the PAC's quarterback for the 1895 and 1896 seasons.

== College football ==
Prior to his professional career, Aull played at the college level for Penn State from 1889 to 1891. On November 11, 1889, Penn State suffered their worst loss in football history falling to Lehigh University 106–0. The players arrived back at campus and asked about the game. Aull stated that "We couldn't get at the son-of-a-bitch with the ball."

On October 28, 1900, Aull was the referee for a game between the professional Duquesne Country and Athletic Club and the amateur Penn State football team. Duquesne won the game, held in Pittsburgh, by a score of 29–0.
