= James Beveridge (American football) =

American football player and coach (1868–1932)

Biographical details
- Born: February 8, 1868
- Died: September 27, 1932 (aged 64); Queens, New York, U.S.

Playing career
- 1890–1892: Princeton
- Position: Halfback

Coaching career (HC unless noted)
- 1893: Western Reserve

Head coaching record
- Overall: 5–3–1

James Beveridge (February 8, 1868 – December 27, 1932) was an American college football player and coach. Beveridge was raised in Schenectady, New York and played football at Princeton University in 1892, before graduating in 1893. He was the head football coach of Western Reserve University, now Case Western Reserve University, during the 1893 college football season, earning a 5–3–1 record. Beveridge graduated from New York Law School in 1895.

Beveridge married Anna Preston Lamb in 1900. He died on December 27, 1932, at Jamaica Hospital in Queens, New York, a week after having an operation for appendicitis. Beveridge is buried with his wife, Anna, at Evergreen Cemetery in New Haven, Connecticut.

== Head coaching record ==
Year	Team	Overall	Conference	Standing	Bowl/playoffs
Western Reserve (Independent) (1893)
1893	Western Reserve	5–3–1			
Western Reserve:		5–3–1			
Total:		5–3–1			
