= Alexander Hamilton Wallis =

American football player (1872–1959)

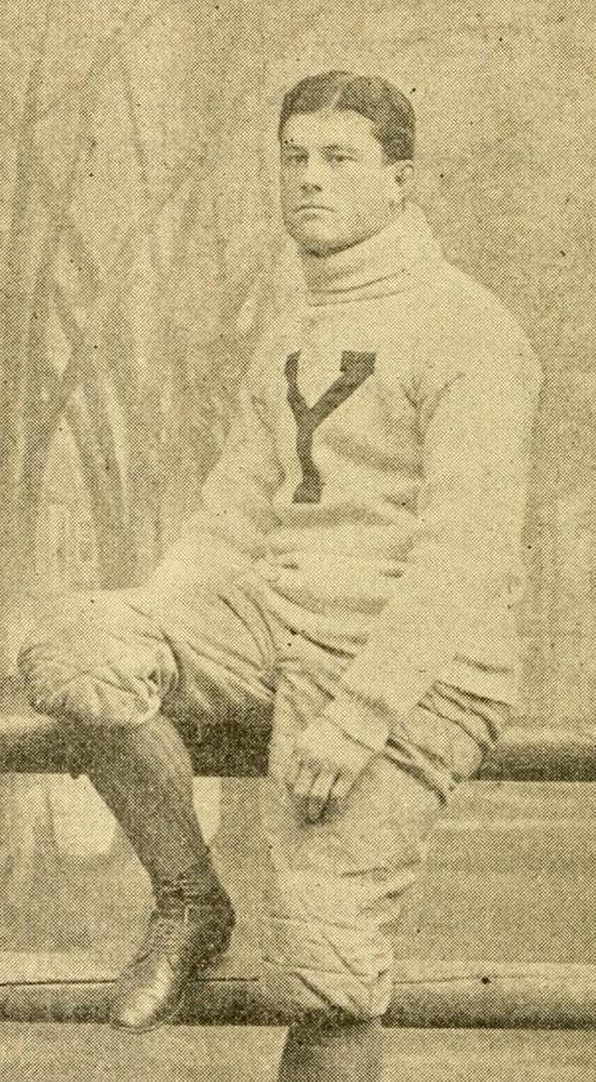
- c. 1892 at Yale

Profile
- Position: Tackle

Personal information
- Born: March 28, 1872; Jersey City, New Jersey, U.S.
- Died: July 25, 1959 (aged 87); New York City, U.S.

Career information
- College: Yale (1890–1892)

Awards and highlights
- 2× National champion (1891, 1892); Consensus All-American (1892)

Alexander Hamilton Wallis (March 28, 1872 – July 25, 1959) was an American college football player. He played tackle for the Yale Bulldogs football team of Yale University from 1890 to 1892, and was selected as an All-American in 1892.

== Early life ==
Wallis was born in Jersey City, New Jersey, in 1872. He was the son of Hamilton Wallis, a prominent lawyer of East Orange, New Jersey. He attended Ashland Public School in East Orange and the Newark Academy.

== Yale ==
Wallis

Wallis attended Yale University where he was a member of the claa crew, the Yale Bulldogs football team, Psi Upsilon, and Skull and Bones. Though Wallis was a lineman, he was a frequent ball carrier for Yale. In November 1892, an article reported that Wallis was running with the ball in his old form, getting off to a quick start, "hitting the line hard and tackling equally hard."

== Later life ==
Walis received an LL.B. degree from New York Law School in 1895. He practiced law in New York until 1898 when he became a salesman for a Boston manufacturer of cut soles and leather. From 1902 to 1903, he worked for the New Jersey Wstreet Railway in Newark. He later worked for the United Railways of San Francisco. He late moved to Colchester, Connecticut.
