= A. C. Read =

American football player

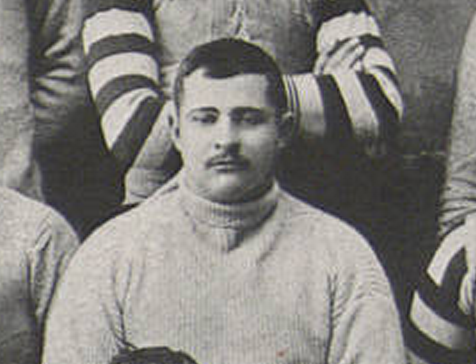
- Read at Penn State, 1890

Profile
- Position: Center

Personal information
- Born: c. 1869; Delano, Pennsylvania, U.S.
- Died: August 17, 1916 (aged 46–47); Pittsburgh, Pennsylvania, U.S.
- Listed height: 5 ft 6 1/2 in (1.69 m)
- Listed weight: 180 lb (82 kg)

Career information
- College: Penn State

Career history
- 1892–1893: Pittsburgh Athletic Club

Augustus Clement Read (c. 1869 – August 17, 1916) was an American college football player and the captain of the Penn State Nittany football team, and a college shot putter. He was from Delano, Pennsylvania.

In 1892, he was suspected of being a paid ringer for the then-amateur Pittsburgh Athletic Club. According to the story, the Pittsburgh A.C. was in need of a replacement at center, due to their regular player being injured. The team was also days away from playing their rival, the Allegheny Athletic Association. Then Pittsburgh captain Charley Aull reportedly ran into an old friend named "Stayer". Both teams agreed to let "Stayer" play in the place of the injured center. A week later it was discovered that "Stayer" was actually Read. Although no one could prove that Read actually had been paid, and Aull had not tried to present him as a Pittsburgh A.C. member, the incident raised tensions between both clubs. Now no club would hesitate to use ringers or professional players. Allegheny then hired, under the table, Pudge Heffelfinger, a college star formerly from Yale, for $500, to play for the club in a November 21 rematch. This game made Heffelfinger the first professional football player.

Read played against the Pittsburgh A.C. on November 5, 1892, when Penn State defeated the club 16–0.

Read played center all season for the Pittsburgh A.C the following season; although no contract was discovered, he is believed to have been paid for his services.

Read later served on the Penn State Board of Trustees. He died in 1916 after a short illness aged 47.
