= Manhattan Athletic Club =

Defunct organization

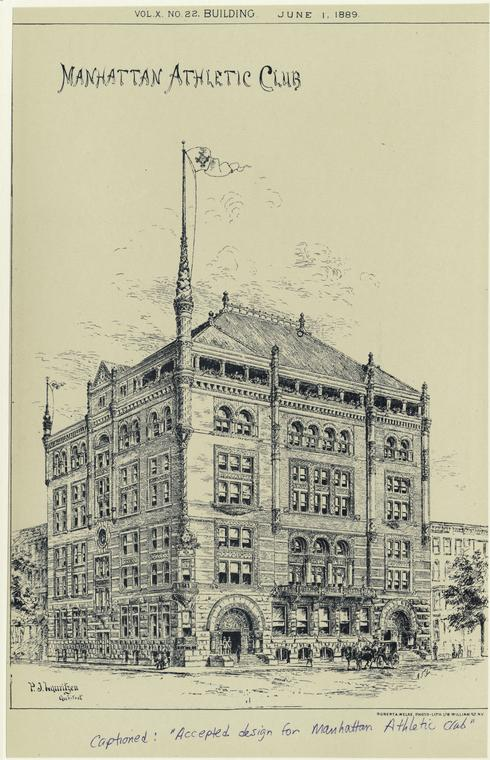
- Manhattan Athletic Club, 1889
- Formation: November 7, 1877; 148 years ago
- Type: Athletic club
- Headquarters: Manhattan, New York City, U.S.
- Key people: Lon Myers, member and world-record-holding runner

The Manhattan Athletic Club was an athletic club in Manhattan, New York City. The club was founded on November 7, 1877, and legally incorporated on April 1, 1878. Its emblem was a "cherry diamond".

It established an athletic cinder ash track at Eighth Avenue between West 56th and 57th Streets in the Hell's Kitchen neighborhood of Manhattan, which opened in 1878. In 1883, it secured grounds at the block between Eighth Avenue and Ninth Avenue, between West 86th and 87th Streets on the Upper West Side. In November 1886, it secured a clubhouse at 594 Fifth Avenue in Midtown Manhattan. The club established a new clubhouse at the southeast corner of Madison Avenue and East 45th Street in Midtown in 1890, with one of the largest gymnasiums in the world, at 100 by 110 feet (30 by 34 m). Through 1917, boxing matches were hosted at the club.

American runner and world record holder Lon Myers was a notable member of the club. Other notable members included speed skater Joe Donoghue, runner Thomas Conneff, and Elliott Fitch Shepard.

In the late 1800s, the Manhattan Athletic Club assisted in creating the Amateur Association. Past members, George W Carr and Walter Storm were elected presidents (1879 and 1887) of the National Association of Amateur Athletes of America (NAAA) (1879 to 1888). Later, the Amateur Athletic Union was formed in 1888.

In 1893, with significant debts, its directors decided to dissolve the club. Andrew Freedman became receiver of the Manhattan Athletic Club when it fell into receivership. A new Manhattan Athletic Club was opened the following year.
