= East Orange Oval =

Sports venue in New Jersey, United States

Coordinates: 40.75964°N 74.20215°W

The East Orange Oval was an athletic field located at Brick Church in East Orange, New Jersey. It was also the first known field used by the Orange Athletic Club football team. The field was also used for track and field events by the Old Brick Church of Orange, among other groups.

== History ==
Called "Oval Park" by the City of East Orange it was home to the Orange Athletic Club later the Orange Tornadoes, played on the field before going on to play in the World Series of Football at Madison Square Garden in 1902.

Oval Park was also saw Negro League Baseball play, seeing the Newark Eagles, New York Black Yankees, Brooklyn Brown Dodgers, Brooklyn Colored Giants, Baltimore Eagles, Birmingham Barons, Chicago Giants, and the Asheville Blues all use the site.

Each year East Orange's Negro team would play it's all-white counterpart at the Oval, which used to have a concrete grandstand.

The Park would be subject to a 6 million dollar renovation from 2023-2024 by Neglia Engineering which saw a walking trail, a new track and field, and a drainage system.

Preceded by Initial	Home of the Orange A.C.- Orange/Newark Tornadoes; 1887–???	Succeeded by East Orange Stadium
