= 1892 college football season =

American college football season

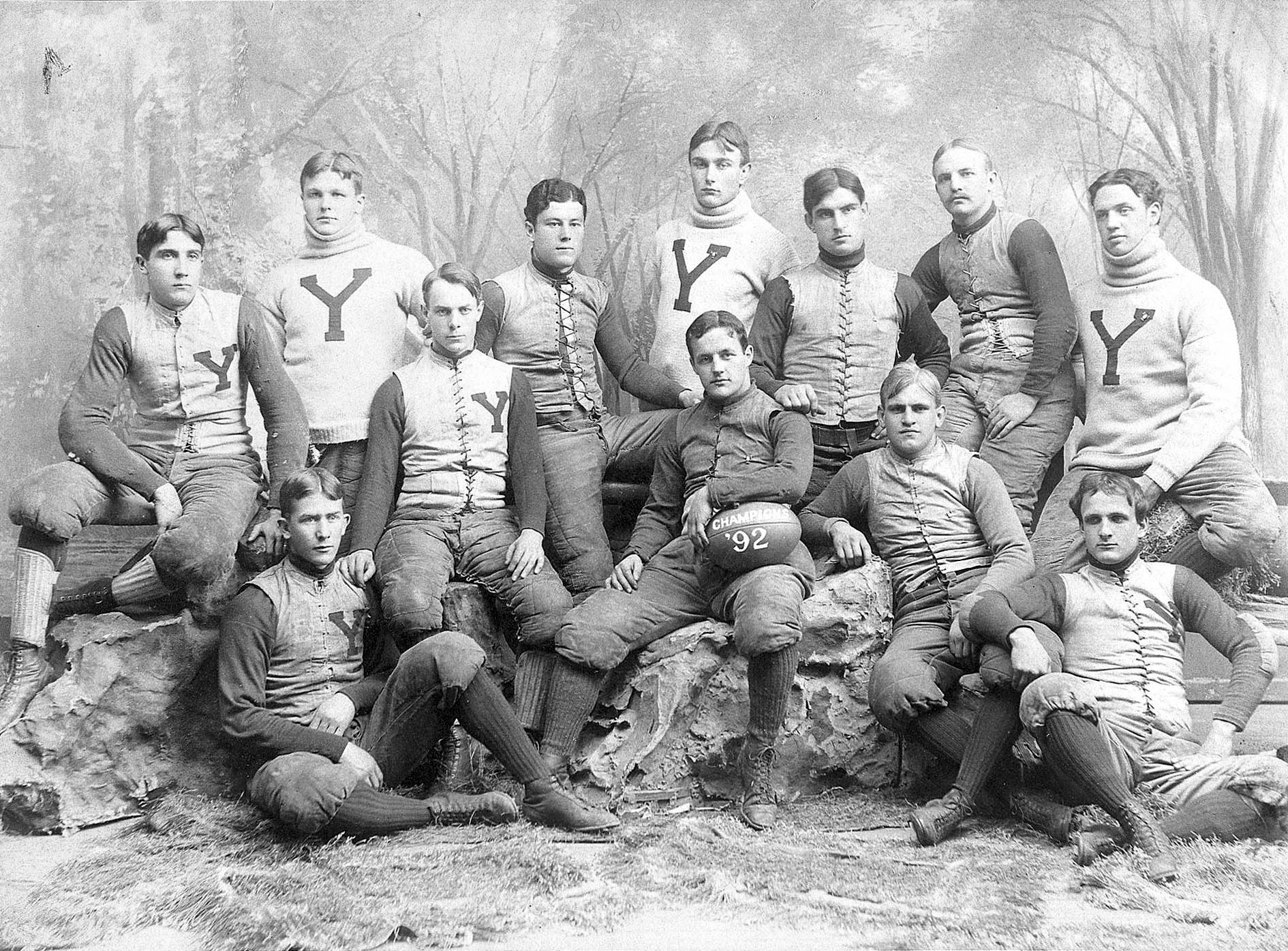
- 1892 Yale Bulldogs
- Total No. of teams: 27
- Regular season: September 24 to November 26
- Champion: Yale

The 1892 college football season was the season of American football played among colleges and universities in the United States during the 1892–93 academic year.

The 1892 Yale Bulldogs football team, led by head coach Walter Camp, compiled a perfect 13–0 record, outscored opponents by a total of 429 to 0, and has been recognized as the national champion by the Billingsley Report, Helms Athletic Foundation, Houlgate System, National Championship Foundation, and Parke H. Davis. Yale's 1892 season was part of a 37-game winning streak that began at the end of the 1890 season and continued into the 1893 season.

All eleven players selected by Caspar Whitney and Walter Camp to the 1892 All-America college football team came from the Big Three (Yale, Harvard, and Princeton). The selections included center William H. Lewis, the first African-American All-American. Five of the honorees have been inducted into the College Football Hall of Fame: quarterback Philip King, fullback Charley Brewer (Harvard), end Frank Hinkey (Yale), tackle Marshall Newell (Harvard), and guard Art Wheeler (Princeton).

Several colleges and universities in the Deep South established football programs in 1892, including Alabama, Auburn, Georgia, Georgia Tech, and South Carolina. In the first college football game in the region, Georgia defeated Mercer on January 30, 1892.

On September 28, 1892, the first football game played outdoors at night took place, between Wyoming Seminary and Mansfield State Normal. The lighting proved difficult and the game ended at halftime in a scoreless tie.

On December 27, 1892, the first game played between two historically black colleges and universities was played between Livingstone College and Biddle College at Livingstone's campus in Salisbury, North Carolina, with Biddle defeating Livingstone.

== Conference and program changes ==
=== Conference establishments ===
- The Western Interstate University Football Association began its first season of play

=== Membership changes ===
School	1891 Conference	1892 Conference
Alabama Cadets	Program Established	Independent
Agricultural & Mechanical of Alabama Tigers	Program Established	Independent
Georgia Bulldogs	Program Established	Independent
Georgia Tech Yellow Jackets	Program Established	Independent
Iowa Hawkeyes	Independent	WIUFA
Iowa State Cyclones	Program established	Independent
Kansas Jayhawks	Independent	WIUFA
Mercer Baptists	Program Established	Independent
Missouri Tigers	Independent	WIUFA
Nebraska Bugeaters	Independent	WIUFA
San Jose State Normal Spartans	Program Established	Independent
South Carolina football	Program Established	Independent
Utah Utes	Program Established	Independent

== Conference standings ==
The following is a potentially incomplete list of conference standings:

1892 Colorado Football Association standings
	Conf.			Overall
Team	W	L	T	W		L		T
Colorado Mines $		–				–
Colorado		–		3	–	2	–	0
Colorado Agricultural		–		2	–	2	–	0
$ – Conference champion

1892 Indiana Intercollegiate Athletic Association football standings
	Conf.					Overall
Team	W		L		T	W		L		T
Purdue $	4	–	0	–	0	8	–	0	–	0
Butler	4	–	1	–	0	5	–	1	–	0
Wabash	1	–	4	–	0	1	–	4	–	0
Indiana	0	–	4	–	0	0	–	4	–	0
$ – Conference champion

1892 Intercollegiate Athletic Association of the Northwest football standings
	Conf.					Overall
Team	W		L		T	W		L		T
Minnesota $	3	–	0	–	0	5	–	0	–	0
Wisconsin	2	–	2	–	0	4	–	3	–	0
Michigan	1	–	2	–	0	7	–	5	–	0
Northwestern	1	–	3	–	0	6	–	4	–	2
$ – Conference champion

1892 New England Intercollegiate Football Association standings
	Conf.					Overall
Team	W		L		T	W		L		T
Amherst $	2	–	0	–	0	9	–	5	–	0
Dartmouth	1	–	1	–	0	5	–	3	–	0
Williams	0	–	2	–	0	4	–	7	–	0
$ – Conference champion

1892 Western Interstate University Football Association standings
	Conf.					Overall
Team	W		L		T	W		L		T
Kansas $	3	–	0	–	0	7	–	1	–	0
Nebraska	1	–	1	–	1	2	–	2	–	1
Missouri	1	–	2	–	0	1	–	2	–	0
Iowa	0	–	2	–	1	3	–	2	–	1
$ – Conference champion

=== Independents ===
1892 Eastern college football independents records
	Conf.			Overall
Team	W	L	T	W		L		T
Yale		–		13	–	0	–	0
Washington & Jefferson		–		4	–	0	–	0
Colgate		–		3	–	0	–	0
Penn		–		15	–	1	–	0
Cornell		–		10	–	1	–	0
Harvard		–		10	–	1	–	0
Princeton		–		12	–	2	–	0
Penn State		–		5	–	1	–	0
Tufts		–		8	–	2	–	0
Navy		–		5	–	2	–	0
Army		–		3	–	1	–	1
Swarthmore		–		7	–	3	–	0
Western Univ. Penn.		–		4	–	2	–	0
Franklin & Marshall		–		4	–	3	–	0
Brown		–		4	–	4	–	2
Bucknell		–		2	–	2	–	0
Fordham		–		2	–	2	–	0
Stevens		–		1	–	1	–	0
Lafayette		–		5	–	7	–	0
Massachusetts		–		4	–	6	–	2
Rutgers		–		3	–	5	–	1
Geneva		–		2	–	4	–	0
Lehigh		–		3	–	6	–	0
Wesleyan		–		1	–	7	–	1
Syracuse		–		0	–	8	–	1
Drexel		–		0	–	1	–	0
NYU		–		0	–	1	–	0

1892 Midwestern college football independents records
	Conf.			Overall
Team	W	L	T	W		L		T
Oberlin		–		7	–	0	–	0
Case		–		3	–	0	–	0
Iowa Agricultural		–		1	–	0	–	1
Notre Dame		–		1	–	0	–	1
Chicago		–		8	–	4	–	1
Michigan State Normal		–		2	–	1	–	0
Illinois		–		7	–	4	–	1
Ohio State		–		5	–	3	–	0
Washington University		–		3	–	2	–	0
Hillsdale		–		3	–	2	–	1
Doane		–		1	–	1	–	0
Heidelberg		–		1	–	1	–	0
Miami (OH)		–		2	–	2	–	0
Buchtel		–		3	–	4	–	0
Lake Forest		–		2	–	3	–	0
Cincinnati		–		1	–	2	–	0
Marquette		–		1	–	2	–	0
Ohio Wesleyan		–		1	–	3	–	0
Wittenberg		–		0	–	2	–	1
St. Ignatius College		–		0	–	1	–	0
Washburn		–		0	–	2	–	0
Kalamazoo		–		0	–	2	–	0

1892 Southern college football independents records
	Conf.			Overall
Team	W	L	T	W		L		T
Centre		–		6	–	0	–	0
Biddle		–		1	–	0	–	0
Furman		–		1	–	0	–	0
North Carolina A&M		–		1	–	0	–	0
Virginia Military		–		4	–	0	–	1
Wake Forest		–		4	–	0	–	1
Johns Hopkins		–		7	–	1	–	0
North Carolina		–		5	–	1	–	0
Central (KY)		–		4	–	1	–	0
Sewanee		–		5	–	1	–	1
Navy		–		5	–	2	–	0
Georgetown		–		4	–	2	–	1
Virginia		–		3	–	2	–	1
Vanderbilt		–		4	–	4	–	0
Alabama		–		2	–	2	–	0
Auburn		–		2	–	2	–	0
Georgia		–		1	–	1	–	0
Virginia A&M		–		1	–	1	–	0
Western Maryland		–		0	–	0	–	1
Richmond		–		2	–	3	–	0
Delaware		–		1	–	2	–	2
Kentucky A&M		–		2	–	4	–	1
Tennessee		–		2	–	5	–	0
Mercer		–		1	–	2	–	0
Trinity (NC)		–		1	–	3	–	0
Hampden–Sydney		–		0	–	1	–	0
Livingstone		–		0	–	1	–	0
Maryville (TN)		–		0	–	1	–	0
South Carolina		–		0	–	1	–	0
Georgia Tech		–		0	–	3	–	0
Maryland		–		0	–	3	–	0

1892 Far West college football independents records
	Conf.			Overall
Team	W	L	T	W		L		T
Saint Mary's		–		1	–	0	–	0
Utah Agricultural		–		1	–	0	–	0
Stanford		–		1	–	0	–	2
California		–		2	–	1	–	1
Gonzaga		–		0	–	0	–	1
Washington		–		1	–	1	–	0
San Jose Normal		–		0	–	1	–	0
Utah		–		0	–	1	–	0

== Awards and honors ==
=== All-Americans ===
The consensus All-America team included:

Position	Name	Height	Weight (lbs.)	Class	Hometown	Team
QB	Philip King	5'6"	154	Jr.	Washington, D. C.	Princeton
HB	Vance McCormick			Sr.	Harrisburg, Pennsylvania	Yale
HB	Harry Thayer			Sr.	Philadelphia, Pennsylvania	Penn
FB	Charley Brewer	5'9"	150	Fr.	Hopkinton, Massachusetts	Harvard
E	Frank Hinkey	5'9"	150	So.	Tonawanda, New York	Yale
T	Alexander Hamilton Wallis			Sr.	Jersey City, New Jersey	Yale
G	Art Wheeler			So.	Philadelphia, Pennsylvania	Princeton
C	William H. Lewis		175	Jr.	Petersburg, Virginia	Harvard
G	Bert Waters			So.	Boston, Massachusetts	Harvard
T	Marshall Newell	5'7"	168	So.	Great Barrington, Massachusetts	Harvard
E	Frank Hallowell			Sr.	Medford, Massachusetts	Harvard

=== Statistical leaders ===
- Player scoring most points: Philip King, Princeton, 105

== See also ==
- 1892 Wyoming Seminary vs. Mansfield State Normal football game
