= Franklin Morse =

American football player and coach (1873–1929)

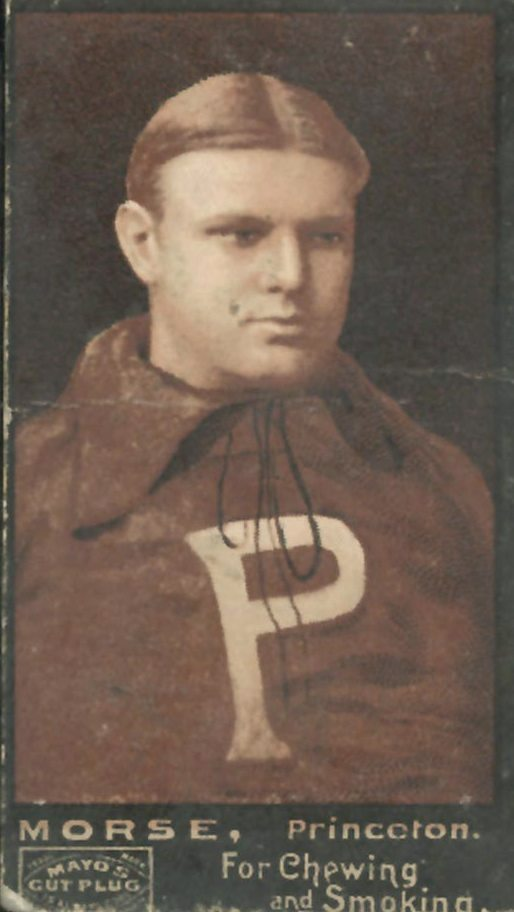
- Franklin Morse, 1894 Mayo's Cut Plug card

Biographical details
- Born: May 4, 1873; Kobe, Japan
- Died: May 27, 1929 (aged 56); Forest Knolls, California, U.S.
- Education: Princeton

Playing career
- 1893–1894: Princeton
- Position: Halfback

Coaching career (HC unless noted)
- 1896: Princeton

Head coaching record
- Overall: 10–0–1

Accomplishments and honors

Championships
- 1 national (1896)

Awards
- Consensus All-American (1893)

Franklin Blake Morse (May 4, 1873 – May 27, 1929) was an All-American football player. Morse played halfback for Princeton University and was selected as an All-American in 1893. He also served as coach of Princeton's football team in 1896. Morse worked as a sports writer from 1904 to 1929, serving as a sports editor for the Associated Press and a columnist for the San Francisco Chronicle. He was also the model for Charles Dana Gibson's popular drawing, "The Halfback."

== Early years ==
Morse was born at the American Consulate in Kobe, Japan, where his family owned a large factory and "an immense amount of property."

== All-American halfback at Princeton ==
Morse attended Princeton University where he played for the football team from 1891 to 1894.

=== 1893 season ===
Prior to the 1893 season, Morse's father, William Horace Morse, was opposed to having his son play and petitioned the school to have him removed from the team. In November 1893, the Philadelphia Inquirer reported:

Princetonians are greatly elated over the return Frank Morse, half-back on last year's team. Frank's father is at present opposed to his playing, and unless he retracts the faculty will prohibit him from so doing, as one college rule states that no student will play with a 'Varsity organization without the consent of his parents. ... Morse played quarter-back in the '91 team and won laurels at half-back in the Thanksgiving game last year.

Though press accounts do not indicate how his father's objections were overcome, Morse was the starting halfback for the 1893 Princeton football team and was named an All-American at the end of the season. The 1893 Princeton team was known as the "perfect team" and filled five of eleven spots on the 1893 All-American team—Morse at halfback, Philip King at quarterback, Art "Beef" Wheeler at guard, Langdon "Biffy" Lea at tackle, and Thomas "Doggie" Trenchard at end. Three of those players, Wheeler, Lea and King have been inducted into the College Football Hall of Fame. In November 1893, The World of New York published a full-page profile on the physical conditioning of the Princeton and Yale football teams. The paper noted that Morse was known for his ability to avoid serious injury despite his "daring and reckless" somersaults:

Morse and Ward are fixtures at halfback. Morse has had considerable trouble in convincing his people that he still needs vigorous exercise. He is without doubt the most daring and reckless half-back on the field. He possesses a singular faculty of preserving a certain amount of self-control throughout all of his somersaults and never receives but temporary injuries.

In 1892, Morse was knocked unconscious by a tackle in the Princeton-Penn game and had to be carried from the field. In 1893, a newspaper described one of Morse's leaps in his second Princeton-Penn game: "Morse made a tremendous leap in the air to go over Osgood, but the latter caught a foot and the pretty play was spoiled. Cheer after cheer rang out from both sections."

The most famous play of Morse's career came in the 1893 Princeton-Yale game, played before a large crowd at Manhattan Field on Thanksgiving Day. With the ball at midfield, Morse ran for the sideline and caught a pass from Dougal Ward. Morse was running in the open field for a touchdown when he stumbled. Nevertheless, the play was "the longest pass on record, a brand new play" that caused football experts to evaluate the efficacy of long passing and "eventually brought the forward pass into the game."

=== 1894 season ===
In 1894, Morse was moved to quarterback to replace King. Newspaper accounts indicate that Morse's move to the quarterback position was less than successful. One paper noted pointed to the quarterback position as Princeton's downfall and noted, "Morse, who by the way is a splendid half, was anything but a success in the position." Morse was sidelined due to illness in the middle of the season with what was described as "a threatened attack of pneumonia." Morse returned to the lineup for the Penn game and put on a display that drew praise for his "pluck" but also dismay at the physical beating he took. The New York World reported as follows:

Morse and Ward were both cripples. I don't believe in talking about the roughness of the game. Any man who goes into it must expect anything and take it, but Morse was tackled altogether beyond the pale of pardon, more than once. When a man gets as far gone as he was and nothing but his indomitable pluck allowed him to stand, somebody should have had the power and the will to force him to leave the game. But he died fighting ...

Despite the beating, Morse was Princeton's leading rusher in the 1894 Penn game, and his 25-yard run was the longest of the game. However, the beating took a permanent toll on Morse. After the game, The New York Times reported on Morse's retirement from football:

Franklin B. Morse, '95, Princeton's greatest half back, has gone out of training and quit the game. This move was not taken by Morse until it was forced upon him. He has been ill for some time and was really unable to go in the game with Pennsylvania, although he played in that game as long as he could stand on his feet. Since then he has been on the field only a few times, and had to leave the game each time. The whole student body deeply regrets Morse's inability to continue playing.

=== Model for Charles Dana Gibson's "The Halfback" ===
Morse also gained fame as the model for a famous drawing by Charles Dana Gibson titled "The Halfback." In the 1890s, Gibson asked the handsome blond Morse to pose for him. The resulting portrait, titled "The Halfback," gained tremendous popularity and prints of the portrait were reportedly "hung in most college rooms throughout the country in those days."

Morse graduated from Princeton in June 1895 with a Bachelor of Arts degree.

== Football coach ==
In 1896, Morse took over as Princeton's regular football coach. He had served a coaching function as far back as 1891, when The New York Times described his role as follows: "Frank Morse, '95, coached the players in today's practice and found many points in the play to criticize." The World of New York in 1896 said of Morse:

Coach Morse is a very wise young man. In the first place he was perhaps the greatest half-back that Princeton ever turned out. He was a star in the team of '93 which is known as the 'perfect team.' This is his first year as a regular coach, and he is said to be one of the best that the New Jersey university has had.

Coach Morse impressed reporters before his first Princeton-Yale game by asserting that his players were in fine physical condition "after months of scientific training":

It is really refreshing to hear a man who knows his player perfectly say, on the eve of the great game of the year, that his men are in perfect fettle. Moreover, he says frankly that the team is one of the best that Princeton has ever had, which is another violation of precedent.

== Later years ==
After coaching the 1896 Princeton team, Morse began a career in the Asian importing business. Morse's mother, Sarah V. Morse, was the controlling shareholder of the Wall Street firm of Smith, Baker & Co. -- one of the country's leading importers of Japanese goods. The company operated a large factory in Kobe, Japan. Morse spent several years living in Asia working in the family's business.

In 1905, Morse returned to the public eye as the result of a divorce involving charges of physical abuse and desertion. Morse's wife was described as the beautiful daughter of an aristocratic Georgia family. The two met at the 1902 Princeton-Yale football game. According to his wife, "We fell in love and he proposed marriage shortly afterward." They married in December 1903 in Chicago, and on returning to New York, the couple kept their marriage a secret. During the divorce proceedings, his wife told the press that Morse insisted on keeping the marriage a secret because Morse "feared his mother's anger." After a year of secrecy, Morse's wife refused to continue to keep the marriage a secret and moved to Cleveland until Morse could come to terms with his mother. When she returned to New York, she alleged that Morse became abusive and then deserted her. Morse's wife told the press she had been compelled to live on the charity of others and had "actually gone hungry at times." In December 1905, a warrant was issued for Morse's arrest, and the details of the allegations were published in the eastern press.

Morse spent the last 25 years of his life as a sports writer. After spending many years in Asia, Morse moved to San Francisco where he became the western sports editor for the Associated Press. After several years with the Associated Press, Morse became a sports columnist for the San Francisco Chronicle, Morning Oregonian of Portland, Oregon and The Evening News of San Jose, California.

Morse died in his sleep at his summer cottage in Forest Knolls, California in May 1929, aged 57. Morse died of heart disease, which was aggravated by lifting heavy rocks at his home. Sports writer Lawrence Perry eulogized Morse in his nationally syndicated column as one of the greatest players in the history of football: "Frank Morse ... was one of those gridiron heroes who quickened the breath of those who were boys in the early nineties. And perhaps older men knew the spell of his personality and his achievements." He is buried in Mount Auburn Cemetery in Cambridge, Massachusetts.

== Head coaching record ==
=== Football ===
Year	Team	Overall	Conference	Standing	Bowl/playoffs
Princeton Tigers (Independent) (1896)
1896	Princeton	10–0–1			
Princeton:		10–0–1			
Total:		10–0–1			
National championship Conference title Conference division title or championship game berth
