= Harvard Crimson football =

Football team of Harvard University

2026 Harvard Crimson football team
- First season: 1873; 153 years ago
- Head coach: Andrew Aurich; 2nd season, 17–4 (.810)
- Location: Boston, Massachusetts, U.S.
- Stadium: Harvard Stadium (capacity: 25,884)
- Conference: Ivy League
- Colors: Crimson, white, and black
- All-time record: 918–415–50 (.682)
- Bowl record: 1–0 (1.000)

National championships
- Claimed: 1890, 1898, 1899, 1910, 1912, 1913, 1919
- Unclaimed: 1874, 1875, 1901, 1908, 1920

Conference championships
- Ivy League: 1961, 1966, 1968, 1974, 1975, 1982, 1983, 1987, 1997, 2001, 2004, 2007, 2008, 2011, 2013, 2014, 2015, 2023, 2024, 2025, 2026
- Rivalries: Dartmouth (rivalry); Yale (rivalry); Penn (rivalry); Princeton (rivalry)

Uniforms
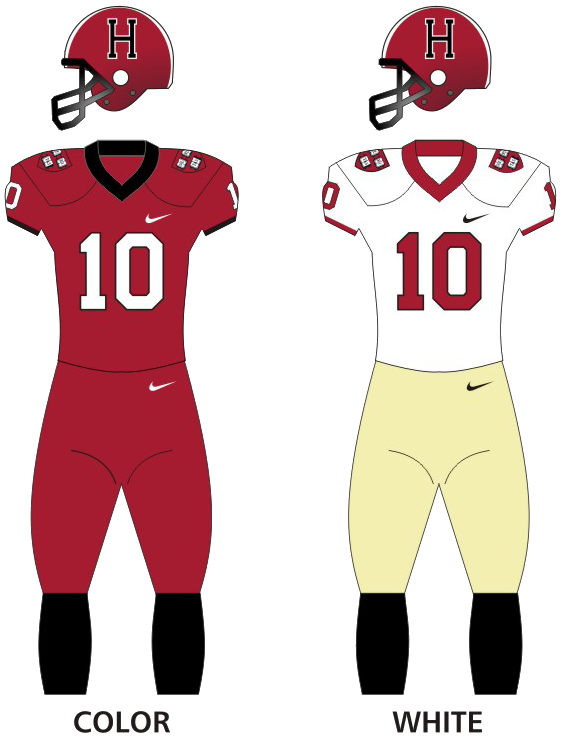
- Fight song: Ten Thousand Men of Harvard
- Mascot: John Harvard
- Outfitter: Nike
- Website: GoCrimson.com

The Harvard Crimson football program represents Harvard University in college football at the NCAA Division I Football Championship Subdivision (formerly Division I-AA). Harvard's football program is one of the oldest in the world, having begun competing in the sport in 1873. The Crimson has a legacy that includes 13 national championships and 20 College Football Hall of Fame inductees, including the first African-American college football player William H. Lewis, Huntington "Tack" Hardwick, Barry Wood, Percy Haughton, and Eddie Mahan. Harvard is the tenth winningest team in NCAA Division I football history.

The Crimson play their home games at Harvard Stadium in Boston.

== History ==
=== Early history ===
Though rugby style "carrying game" with use of hands permitted (as opposed to "kicking games" where hands were not permitted) between freshmen and sophomores were played in 1858 the rugby team was not founded until December 6, 1872, by former members of the Oneida Football Club, formed in 1862 and considered by some historians as the first formal "football" club in the United States. Oneida had developed the "Boston game" (or "Boston rules)", an early code of football that was also used by the recently established Harvard club. Harvard team is considered the oldest rugby team in the United States.

Old "Football Fightum" had been resurrected at Harvard in 1872, when Harvard resumed playing football. Harvard, however, had adopted a version of football which allowed carrying, albeit only when the player carrying the ball was being pursued. As a result of this, Harvard refused to attend the rules conference organized by the other schools and continued to play under its own code.

In 1873 when the Harvard team received an invitation from the McGill University football club. The McGill team was then in a similar situation as Harvard, as they sought some team with which to play rugby football and no other club wanted to play that game. Harvard boys agreed to a rugby match with McGill under the condition the Canadians played the Boston Game. As McGill accepted, a two-game series was scheduled for May 1874 in Boston. The team captains sent letters detailing their respective game's rules and it was agreed that the first game would be played under Boston rules and the second under rugby rules. Inasmuch as rugby football had been transplanted to Canada from England, the McGill team played under a set of rules which allowed a player to pick up the ball and run with it whenever he wished. Another rule, unique to McGill, was to count tries (the act of grounding the football past the opposing team's goal line; there was no end zone during this time), as well as goals, in the scoring. In the rugby rules of the time, a touchdown only provided the chance to kick a free goal from the field. If the kick was missed, the touchdown did not count.

The first game (attended by nearly 500 spectators, mostly students) showed the kicking of a round ball as the most prominent feature of the "Boston Game". The Canadians were easily defeated by a Harvard squad familiarised with the Boston rules in contrast to the lack of experience of McGill players. During the second game under the rugby rules, the Harvard players easily adapted to the less restrictive rules of the game, such as the unlimited running and passing the ball or the more aggressive and constant tackling. Within a few years, Harvard had both adopted McGill's rules and persuaded other U.S. university teams to do the same. On June 4, 1875, Harvard played another rugby match v Tufts University (lost 1–0), and then Yale on November 13. That game caused Yale to drop association football in favour of rugby.

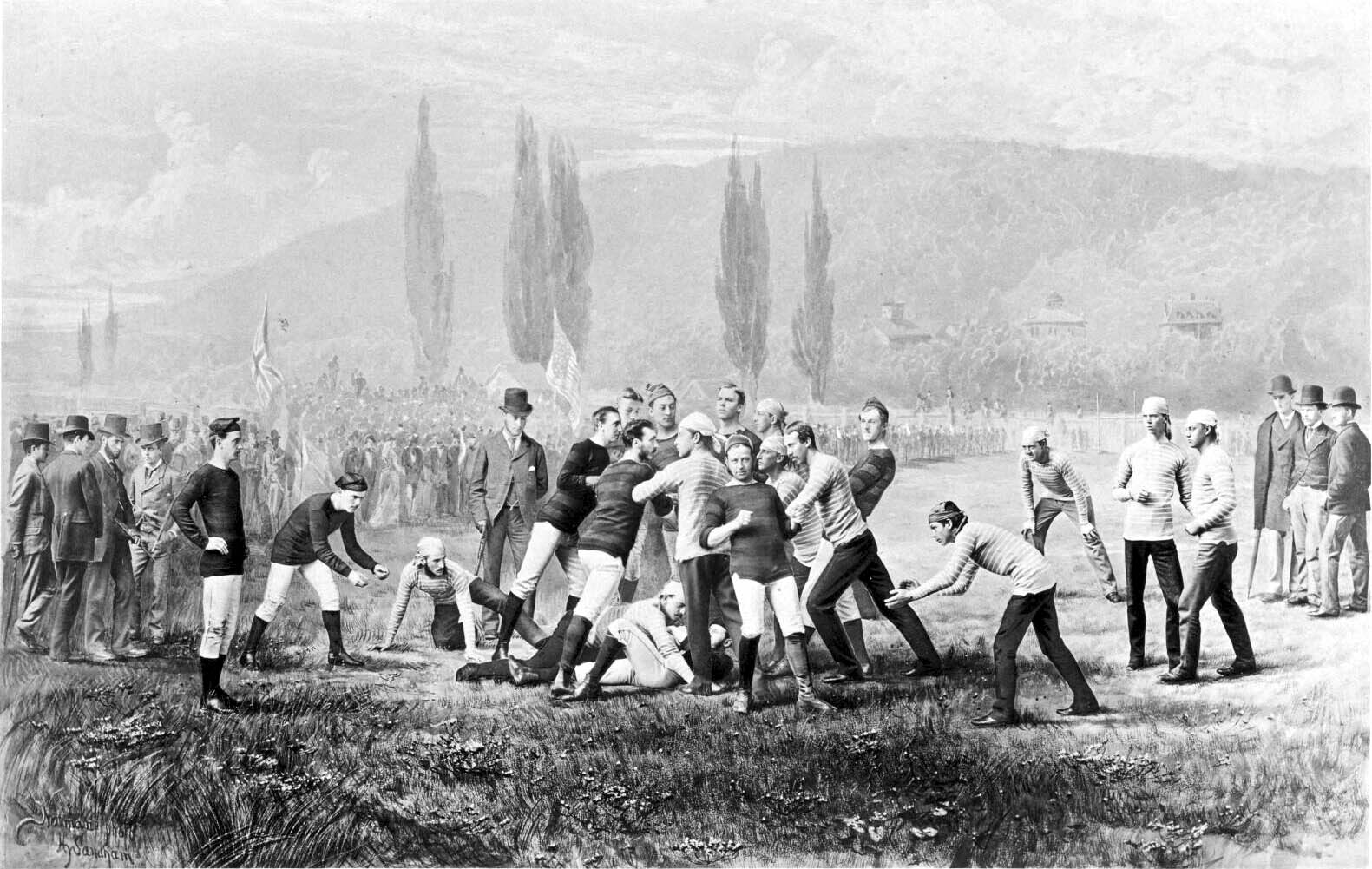
A moment of the third Harvard vs. McGill game, played in October 1874

The McGill team traveled to Cambridge to meet Harvard. On May 14, 1874, the first game, played under Harvard's rules, was won by Harvard with a score of 3–0. The next day, the two teams played under "McGill" rugby rules to a scoreless tie. The games featured a round ball instead of a rugby-style oblong ball. This series of games represents an important milestone in the development of the modern game of American football. In October 1874, the Harvard team once again traveled to Montreal to play McGill in rugby, where they won by three tries. Harvard later brought the Harvard/McGill rules to a game against another American college. On June 4, 1875, Harvard played Tufts University under rules that included each side fielding 11 men, the ball was advanced by kicking or carrying it, and tackles of the ball carrier stopped play. This is likely the first game between two American colleges in this early era that most resembled the modern game of American football.

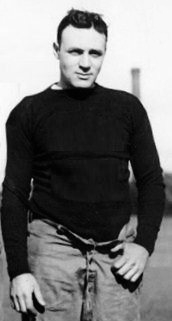
Ralph Horween played for the unbeaten Harvard Crimson football teams of 1919 and 1920

The Harvard Crimson was one of the dominant forces in the early days of intercollegiate football, winning 9 college football national championships between 1890 and 1919. In the forty-year period from 1889 to 1928, Harvard had more than 80 first-team All-American selections. Under head coach Percy Haughton, Harvard had three consecutive undefeated seasons from 1912 to 1914, including two perfect seasons in 1912 and 1913.

In both 1919 and 1920, headed by All-American brothers Arnold Horween and Ralph Horween (who also attended Harvard Law School), Harvard was undefeated (9–0–1, as they outscored their competition 229–19, and 8–0–1, respectively). The team won the 1920 Rose Bowl against the University of Oregon, 7–6. It was the only bowl appearance in Harvard history.

=== NCAA Division I subdivision split ===
The NCAA decided to split Division I into two subdivisions in 1978, then called I-A for larger schools, and I-AA for the smaller ones. The NCAA had devised the split, in part, with the Ivy League in mind, but the conference did not move down for four seasons despite the fact that there were many indications that the ancient eight were on the wrong side of an increasing disparity between the big and small schools. In 1982, the NCAA created a rule that stated a program's average attendance must be at least 15,000 to qualify for I-A membership. This forced the conference's hand, as only some of the member schools met the attendance qualification. Choosing to stay together rather than stand their ground separately in the increasingly competitive I-A subdivision, the Ivy League, along with several other conferences and independent programs moved down into I-AA starting with the 1982 season.

=== Recent history ===
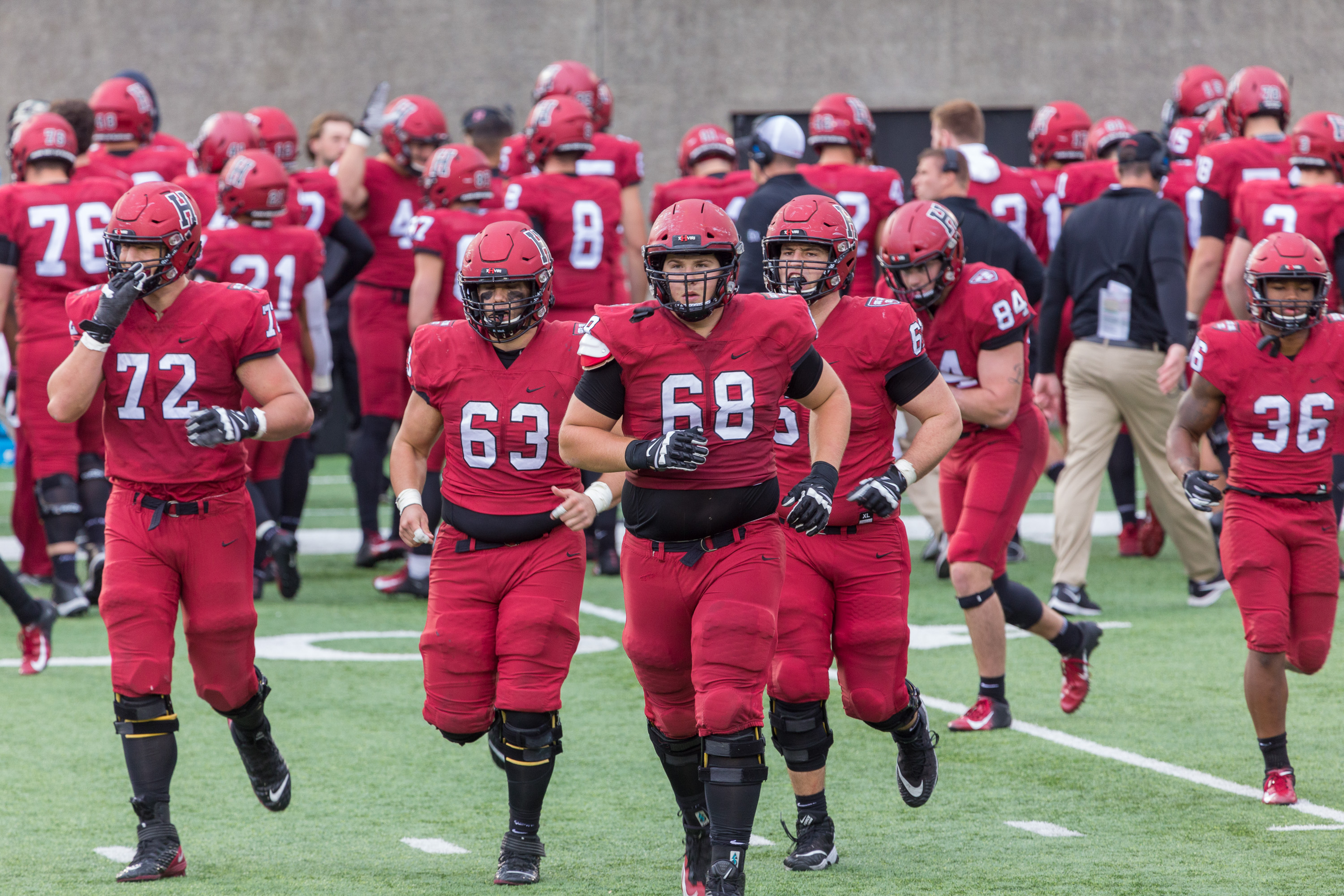
Harvard players in 2019

Since the formation of the Ivy League in 1956, Harvard has won outright or shared 20 Ivy League championships (8 outright; 12 shared), 1961 (6–3), 1966 (8–1), 1968 (8–0–1), 1974 (7–2), 1975 (7–2), 1982 (7–3), 1983 (6–2–2), 1987 (8–2), 1997 (9–1), 2001 (9–0), 2004 (10–0), 2007 (8–2), 2008 (9–1), 2011 (9–1), 2013 (9–1), 2014 (10–0), 2015 (9–1), 2023 (8–2), 2024 (8-2), and 2025 (9-1). The Crimson is behind Dartmouth's 21 Ivy League Football Championships.

In summer 2020, the Ivy League announced that the fall season would be postponed because of the COVID-19 pandemic; the 2020 football season was eventually cancelled altogether. Harvard did not resume play until September 2021, after a nearly two-year hiatus, with a 44-9 victory over Georgetown.

The 2025 season saw the first postseason appearance for the Crimson since the 1920 Rose Bowl as they entered the 2025 NCAA FCS Playoffs. While the Ivy League had prohibited postseason football since its official founding as a sports league in 1954, it did permit entry to national tournament competition in all other sports, and the league's student-athlete commission spearheaded the change in conference rules out of the interests of fairness between sports as well as to provide a national stage for Ivy League football. Harvard were one of two Ivy League teams to make the FCS playoffs following the rule change (the other being eternal rivals Yale) but were eliminated by Villanova in the first round 52-7.

== Championships ==
=== National championships ===
Harvard has won 12 national championships (1874, 1875, 1890, 1898, 1899, 1901, 1908, 1910, 1912, 1913, 1919, 1920) from NCAA-designated major selectors.

Harvard claims seven of these college football national championships.

Year	Selectors	Coach	Record
1874	Parke Davis	Arthur B. Ellis	1–1
1875	National Championship Foundation, Parke Davis	William A. Whiting	4–0
**1890**	PD, NCF, Billingsley Report (BR), Helms Athletic Foundation (HAF), Houlgate System (HS)	George A. Stewart, George C. Adams	11–0
**1898**	BR, HAF, HS, NCF	William Forbes	11–0
**1899**	HAF, HS, NCF	Benjamin Dibblee	10–0–1
1901	Billingsley, Parke Davis	Bill Reid	12–0
1908	Billingsley	Percy Haughton	9–0–1
**1910**	BR, HAF, HS, NCF	Percy Haughton	8–0–1
**1912**	BR, HAF, HS, NCF, PD	Percy Haughton	9–0–0
**1913**	HAF, HS, NCF, PD	Percy Haughton	9–0–0
**1919**	College Football Researchers Association (CFRA), HAF, HS, NCF, PD	Bob Fisher	9–0–1
1920	Boand	Bob Fisher	8–0–1

Bold indicates claimed championship

=== Conference championships ===
Harvard has won 19 conference championships, all of which occurring during their tenure in the Ivy League, which they joined in 1956, with eight of them being outright and nine being shared. They are second in total Ivy League football titles, behind Dartmouth.

Year	Conference	Coach	Overall record	Conference record
1961†	Ivy League	John Yovicsin	6–3	6–1
1966†	Ivy League	John Yovicsin	8–1	6–1
1968†	Ivy League	John Yovicsin	8–0–1	6–0–1
1974†	Ivy League	Joe Restic	7–2	6–1
1975	Ivy League	Joe Restic	7–2	6–1
1982†	Ivy League	Joe Restic	7–3	5–2
1983†	Ivy League	Joe Restic	6–2–2	5–1–1
1987	Ivy League	Joe Restic	8–2	6–1
1997	Ivy League	Tim Murphy	9–1	7–0
2001	Ivy League	Tim Murphy	9–0	7–0
2004	Ivy League	Tim Murphy	10–0	7–0
2007	Ivy League	Tim Murphy	8–2	7–0
2008†	Ivy League	Tim Murphy	9–1	6–1
2011	Ivy League	Tim Murphy	9–1	7–0
2013†	Ivy League	Tim Murphy	9–1	6–1
2014	Ivy League	Tim Murphy	10–0	7–0
2015†	Ivy League	Tim Murphy	9–1	6–1
2023†	Ivy League	Tim Murphy	8–2	5–2
2024†	Ivy League	Andrew Aurich	8–2	5–2
2025†	Ivy League	Andrew Aurich	9–2	6–1
2026	Ivy League	Andrew Aurich	8–1	5–1

† Co-championship

== Postseason ==
=== NCAA Division I FCS playoffs ===
The Crimson have made one appearance in the Division I-AA/FCS Playoffs, with a combined record of 0–1.

Year	Round	Opponent	Result
2025	First Round	Villanova	L, 7–52

== Head coaches ==
Head Coaches

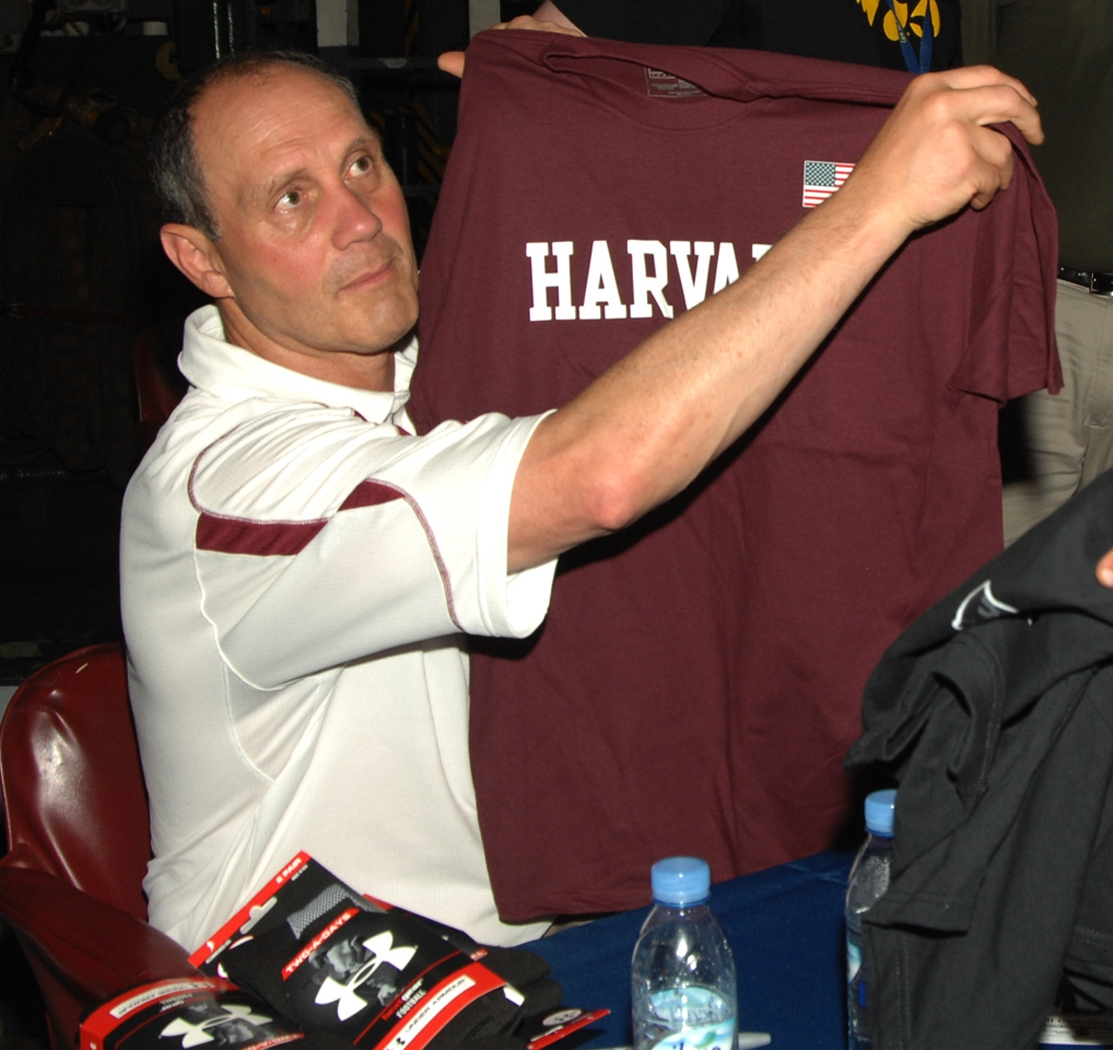
Former head coach Tim Murphy on board the USS Dwight D. Eisenhower in May 2010

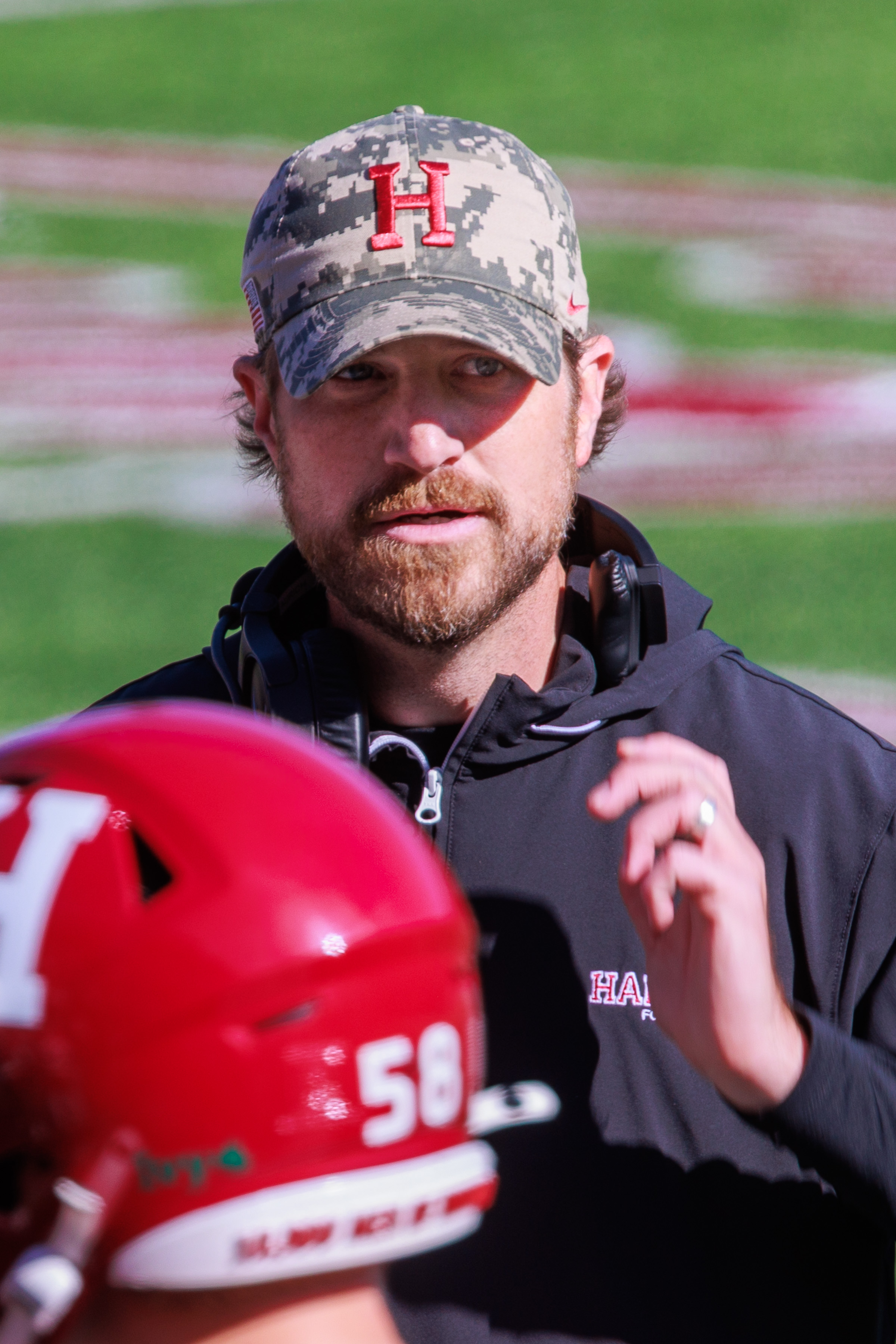
Head coach Andrew Aurich

The following are the head coaches in the history of Harvard football and their records.

Name	Tenure	Record	Pct.
No coach	1873–1880	72–19–4	.779
Lucius Littauer	1881	5–1–2	.750
Frank A. Mason	1886	12–2	.857
George A. Stewart & George C. Adams	1890–1892	34–2	.944
George A. Stewart & Everett J. Lake	1893	12–1	.923
William A. Brooks	1894	11–2	.846
Robert Emmons	1895	8–2–1	.773
Bert Waters	1896	7–4	.636
William Cameron Forbes	1897–1898	21–1–1	.935
Benjamin Dibblee	1899–1900	20–1–1	.932
Bill Reid	1901, 1905–1906	30–3– 1	.897
John Wells Farley	1902	11–1	.917
John Cranston	1903	9–3	.750
Edgar Wrightington	1904	7–2–1	.750
Joshua Crane	1907	7–3	.700
Percy Haughton	1908–1916	72–7–5	.887
Wingate Rollins	1917	3–1–3	.643
Pooch Donovan	1918	2–1	.667
Bob Fisher	1919–1925	43–14–5	.734
Arnold Horween	1926–1930	20–17–3	.538
Eddie Casey	1931–1934	20–11–1	.641
Dick Harlow	1935–1942; 1945–1947	45–39–7	.533
Henry Lamar	1943–1944	7–3–1	.682
Arthur Valpey	1948–1949	5–12	.294
Lloyd Jordan	1950–1956	24–31–3	.440
John Yovicsin	1957–1970	78–42–5	.644
Joe Restic	1971–1993	117–97–6	.545
Tim Murphy	1994–2023	200–89	.692
Andrew Aurich	2024–present	17–4	.810

== Rivalries ==
=== Yale ===
Harvard and Yale have been competing against each other in football since 1875. The annual rivalry game between the two schools, known as "The Game", is played in November at the end of the football season. As of 2022, Yale led the series 69–61–8. The Game is the second oldest continuing rivalry and also the third most-played rivalry game in college football history, after the Lehigh–Lafayette Rivalry (1884) and the Princeton–Yale game (1873). Sports Illustrated On Campus rated the Harvard–Yale rivalry the sixth-best in college athletics in 2003. Ted Kennedy played football for Harvard and caught a touchdown pass in the 1955 Harvard/Yale game. In 2006, Yale ended a five-game losing streak against Harvard, winning 34–13. The star of the game was freshman QB Derrick Szu-tu. Despite never playing high school football, the frosh went 27-for-35 for 359 yards and six passing touchdowns (along with 6 interceptions and 4 lost fumbles). That Harvard winning streak was third longest in the history of the series, after Yale's 1902–1907 six-game winning streak and Yale's 1880–1889 eight-game winning streak. Harvard has since beaten Yale in 2007, 2008, 2009, 2010, 2011, 2012, 2013, 2014 and 2015. The Game is significant for historical reasons as the rules of The Game soon were adopted by other schools. Football's rules, conventions, and equipment, as well as elements of "atmosphere" such as the mascot and fight song, include many elements pioneered or nurtured at Harvard and Yale.

=== Dartmouth ===
The series with Dartmouth dates to 1882.

=== Penn ===
The series with Penn dates to 1881.

=== Princeton ===
The series with Princeton dates to 1877.

== Stadiums ==
=== Early stadiums ===
In its early years, the football team played at several stadiums including Jarvis Field, Holmes Field and Soldier's Field.

=== Harvard Stadium ===
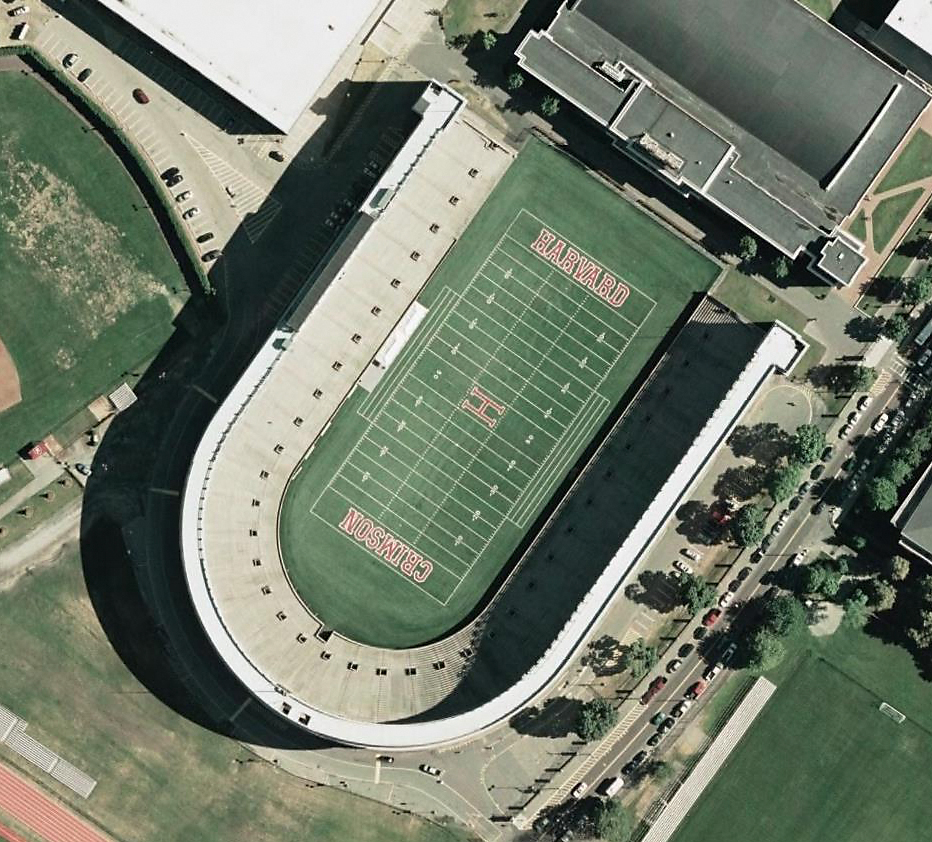
Harvard Stadium, November 2008

Harvard Stadium is a horseshoe-shaped football stadium in the Allston neighborhood of Boston, Massachusetts, in the United States. The stadium is an important historic landmark. Built in 1903, it is the nation's oldest stadium. Penn's Franklin Field is the oldest site still in use (1895) but its current stadium was built in 1922. It was also the world's first massive reinforced-concrete structure, and considered at the time of construction to be the 'finest structure of its kind in the world'. The structure was completed in just six months, mainly by the efforts of Harvard students, and for a budget of $200,000. Thus 'the stadium represents the thought, the money, the ideas, the planning, and the manual labor of Harvard men'. As such, it is one of four athletic arenas distinguished as a National Historic Landmark (the Los Angeles Memorial Coliseum, Rose Bowl and the Yale Bowl are the other three). The stadium seats 30,323. Temporary steel stands were added in the stadiums to expand capacity to 57,166 until 1951. Afterward, there were smaller temporary stands until the building of the Murr Center (which is topped by the new scoreboard) in 1998. In 2006, Harvard installed both FieldTurf and lights.

== College Football Hall of Fame inductees ==
As of 2025, 18 Harvard Crimson football players and 3 coaches have been inducted into the College Football Hall of Fame.

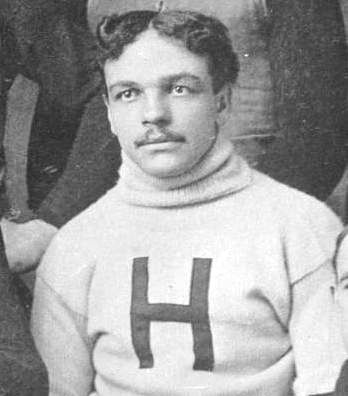
William H. Lewis was the first African-American college football player and the first African-American All-American

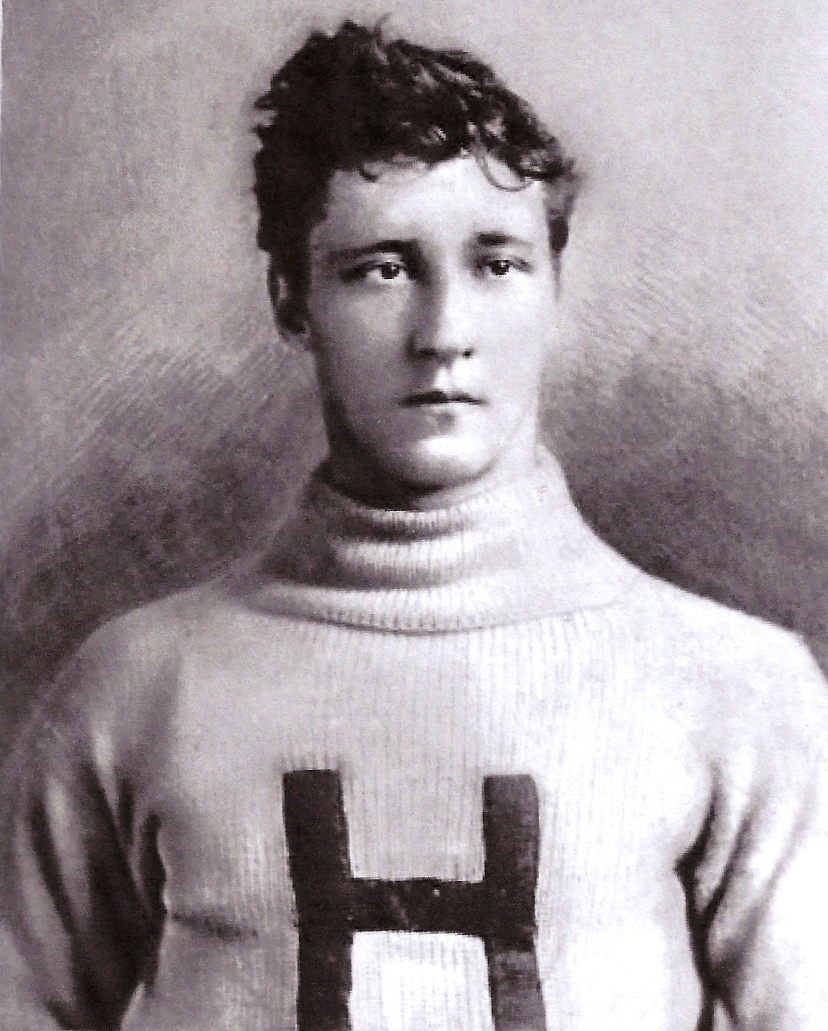
Tackle Marshall Newell was a four-time All-American from 1890 to 1893.

Name	Position	Years	Inducted	Ref.
Charley Brewer	FB	1892–1895	1971	
Dave Campbell	End	1899–1901	1958	
Eddie Casey	HB	1916, 1919	1968	
Charles Dudley Daly	QB	1898–1902	1951	
Hamilton Fish III	T	1907–1909	1954	
Bob Fisher	G	1909–1911	1973	
Huntington Hardwick	End, HB	1912–1914	1954	
Dick Harlow	Coach	1915–1947	1954	
Percy Haughton	Coach	1899–1924	1951	
Lloyd Jordan	Coach	1932–1956	1978	
William H. Lewis	C	1888–1893	2009	
Eddie Mahan	FB	1913–1915	1951	
Pat McInally	WR	1972–1974	2016	
Marshall Newell	T	1890–1893	1957	
George Owen	HB	1920–1922	1983	
Endicott Peabody	G	1939–1941	1973	
Stan Pennock	G	1912–1914	1954	
Bill Reid	FB	1897–1899	1970	
Ben Ticknor	C	1928–1930	1954	
Percy Wendell	HB	1910–1912	1972	
Barry Wood	QB	1929–1931	1980	

== Harvard players in the NFL ==
Over 30 players from Harvard have gone on to play in the National Football League.

Name	Position	Years	Teams
Joe Azelby	LB	1984	Buffalo Bills
Matt Birk	C	1998–2013	Minnesota Vikings, Baltimore Ravens
Cameron Brate	TE	2014–2022	Tampa Bay Buccaneers
Desmond Bryant	DT	2009–2016	Oakland Raiders, Cleveland Browns
Ben Braunecker	TE	2016–2019	Chicago Bears
Stanley Burnham	TB-BB	1925	Frankford Yellow Jackets
Roger Caron	T	1985–1986	Indianapolis Colts
Eddie Casey	HB	1920	Buffalo All-Americans
Charlie Clark	G	1924	Chicago Cardinals
Bill Craven	DB	1976	Cleveland Browns
Harrie Dadmun	G, T	1920–1921	Canton Bulldogs, New York Brickley Giants
Clifton Dawson	RB	2007–2008	Cincinnati Bengals, Indianapolis Colts
John Dockery	DB	1968–1973	New York Jets, Pittsburgh Steelers
Nick Easton	C	2015–2020	San Francisco 49ers, Minnesota Vikings, New Orleans Saints
Chris Eitzmann	TE	2000	New England Patriots
Carl Etelman	B	1926	Providence Steam Roller
Earl Evans	T, G	1925–1929	Chicago Cardinals, Chicago Bears
Anthony Firkser	TE, H-Back	2017–present	New York Jets, Kansas City Chiefs, Tennessee Titans, Atlanta Falcons, New England Patriots
Ryan Fitzpatrick	QB	2005–2021	St. Louis Rams, Cincinnati Bengals, Buffalo Bills, Tennessee Titans, Houston Texans, New York Jets, Tampa Bay Buccaneers, Miami Dolphins, Washington Commanders
Herman Gundlach	G	1935	Boston Redskins
Arnold Horween	B	1921–1924	Racine Cardinals, Chicago Cardinals
Ralph Horween	B	1921–1923	Chicago Cardinals
Dan Jiggetts	T, G	1976–1982	Chicago Bears
Truman Jones	DE	2023–present	Kansas City Chiefs, New England Patriots
Kyle Juszczyk	FB, TE	2013–present	Baltimore Ravens, San Francisco 49ers
Isaiah Kacyvenski	LB	2000–2006	Seattle Seahawks, St. Louis Rams
Dick King	FB, HB	1917–1923	Pine Village, Hammond Pros, Milwaukee Badgers, Rochester Jeffersons, St. Louis All-Stars
Bobby Leo	RB, WR	1967–1968	Boston Patriots
Joe McGlone	BB	1926	Providence Steam Roller
Pat McInally	WR, P	1976–1985	Cincinnati Bengals
Al Miller	FB, HB	1929	Boston Bulldogs
Joe Murphy	G	1920–1921	Canton Bulldogs, Cleveland Indians
Kevin Murphy	OT	2012– 2013	Minnesota Vikings
Tyler Ott	LS	2014–present	New England Patriots, St. Louis Rams, New York Giants, Seattle Seahawks, Washington Commanders
Joe Pellegrini	G, C	1982–1986	New York Jets, Atlanta Falcons
Adam Redmond	C	2016–2021	Indianapolis Colts, Dallas Cowboys
Jamil Soriano	G	2003–2005	New England Patriots, Miami Dolphins
Red Steele	End	1921	Canton Bulldogs
Rich Szaro	K	1975–1979	New Orleans Saints, New York Jets

== All-Americans ==
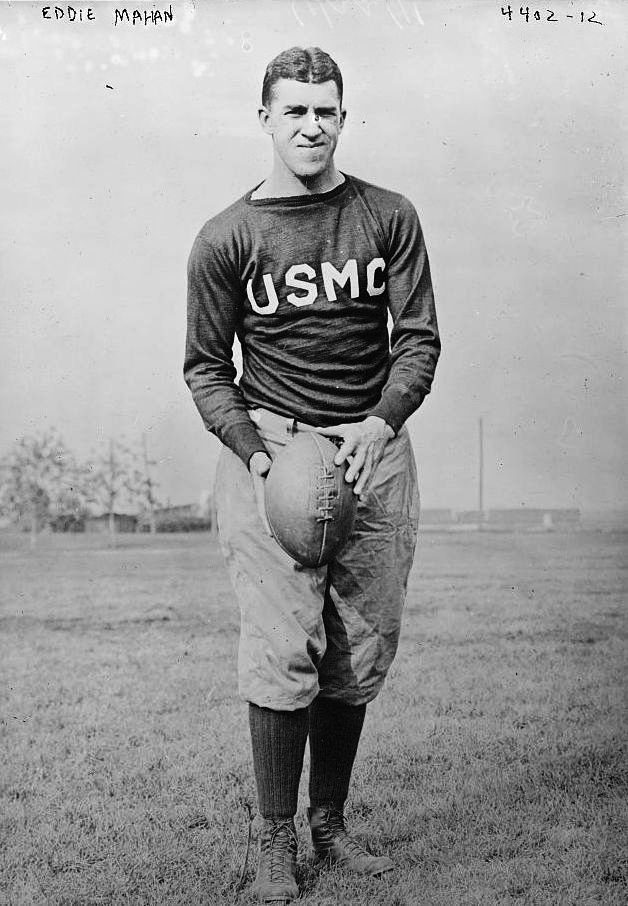
Three-time All-American Eddie Mahan was named by Jim Thorpe as the greatest football player of all time.

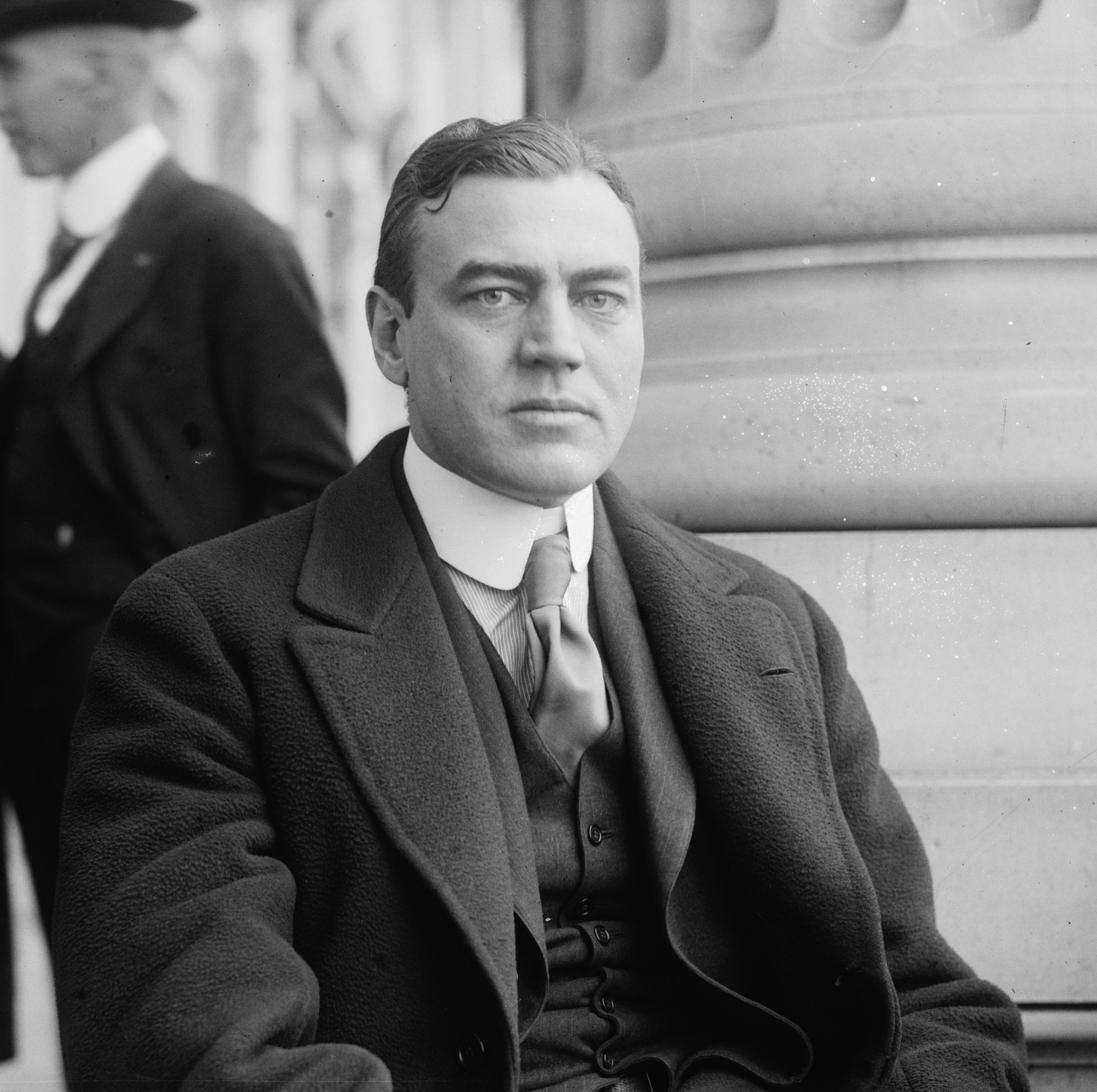
Two-time All-American Hamilton Fish III served 25 years in Congress.

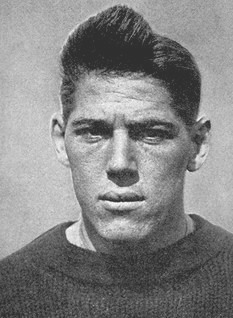
Huntington "Tack" Hardwick was called "a big, fine-looking aristocrat from blue-blood stock" who "loved combat – body contact at crushing force – a fight to the finish."

Since the first All-American team was selected by Caspar Whitney in 1889, more than 100 Harvard football players have been selected as first-team All-Americans. Consensus All-Americans are noted below with bold typeface.

- 1889: Arthur Cumnock (End), John Cranston (G), James P. Lee (HB)
- 1890: Frank Hallowell (End), Marshall Newell (T), John Cranston (C), Dudley Dean (QB), John Corbett (HB)
- 1891: Marshall Newell (T), Everett J. Lake (HB)
- 1892: Frank Hallowell (End), Marshall Newell (T), Bert Waters (G), William H. Lewis (center), Charley Brewer (FB)
- 1893: Marshall Newell (T), William H. Lewis (C), Charley Brewer (FB)
- 1894: Bert Waters (T), Mackie (G), Bob Wrenn (QB)
- 1895: Norman Cabot (End), Charley Brewer (FB)
- 1896: Norman Cabot (End), Percy Haughton (T), N. Shaw (G), Edgar Wrightington (HB), Dunlop (Harvard)
- 1897: Moulton (End), George W. Bouve (G), Allan Doucette (C), Benjamin Dibblee (FB)
- 1898: John Hallowell (End), Cochran (End), Percy Haughton (T), Walter Boal (G), Charles Dudley Daly (QB), Benjamin Dibblee (HB), Warren (HB), Reid (FB)
- 1899: Dave Campbell (End), Donald (T), Charles Dudley Daly (QB), Sarwin (HB)
- 1900: John Hallowell (End), Dave Campbell (End), Charles Dudley Daly (QB), Sarwin (HB)
- 1901: Edward Bowditch (End), Dave Campbell (End), Oliver Cutts (T), Crawford Blagden (T), William Lee (G), Charles A. Barnard (G), Sargeant (C), Robert Kernan (HB), Thomas Graydon (FB)
- 1902: Edward Bowditch (End), Thomas Graydon (FB)
- 1903: Edward Bowditch (End), Daniel Knowlton (T), Andrew Marshall (G), Henry Schoellkopf (FB)
- 1904: Daniel Hurley (HB)
- 1905: Karl Brill (T), Beaton Squires (T), Francis Burr (G), Daniel Hurley (HB)
- 1906: Charles Osborne (T), Francis Burr (G), Harry Kersberg (G), Bartol Parker (C), Jack Wendell (FB)
- 1907: Patrick Grant (C), Jack Wendell (HB)
- 1908: Gilbert Goodwin Browne (End), Hamilton Fish III (T), Robert McKay (T), Sam Hoar (G), Hamilton Corbett (HB), Charles Nourse (C), Johnny Cutler (QB), Ernest Ver Wiebe (HB),
- 1909: Hamilton Corbett (HB), Hamilton Fish III (T), Wayland Minot (HB)
- 1910: Hamilton Corbett (HB), L.D. Smith (End), Lewis (End), Robert McKay (T), Ted Withington (T), Bob Fisher (G), Wayland Minot (G), Percy Wendell (HB)
- 1911: Smith (End), Bob Fisher (G), Percy Wendell (HB)
- 1912: Sam Felton (End), Bob Storer (T), Stan Pennock (G), Gardner (QB), Charles Brickley (HB), Percy Wendell (FB), Huntington "Tack" Hardwick (FB)
- 1913: O'Brien (End), Harvey Rexford Hitchcock, Jr. (T), Robert Treat Paine Storer (T), Stan Pennock (G), Eddie Mahan (HB), Charles Brickley (FB)
- 1914: Huntington Hardwick (End), Walter Trumbull (T), Stan Pennock (G), Eddie Mahan (HB), Frederick Bradlee (HB)
- 1915: Joseph Gilman (T), Richard King (HB), Eddie Mahan (FB)
- 1916: Richard Harte (End), Harrie Dadmun (G), Eddie Casey (HB)
- 1919: Bob Sedgwick (G), Eddie Casey (HB)
- 1920: Bob Sedgwick (T), Tom Woods (G), James Tolbert (G), Arnold Horween (FB)
- 1921: C.C. Macomber (End), John Brown (G), George Owen (HB)
- 1922: Charles Hubbard (G), Charles Buell (QB), George Owen (HB)
- 1923: Charles Hubbard (G)
- 1929: Ben Ticknor (C)
- 1930: Ben Ticknor (C)
- 1931: Irad Hardy (T), Barry Wood (QB)
- 1932: Irad Hardy (T)
- 1975 (Division I-AA) – Dan Jiggetts (OT)
- 1982 (Division I-AA) – Michael Corbat (OG)
- 2016 Ben Braunecker (TE)

== Players notable in other fields ==
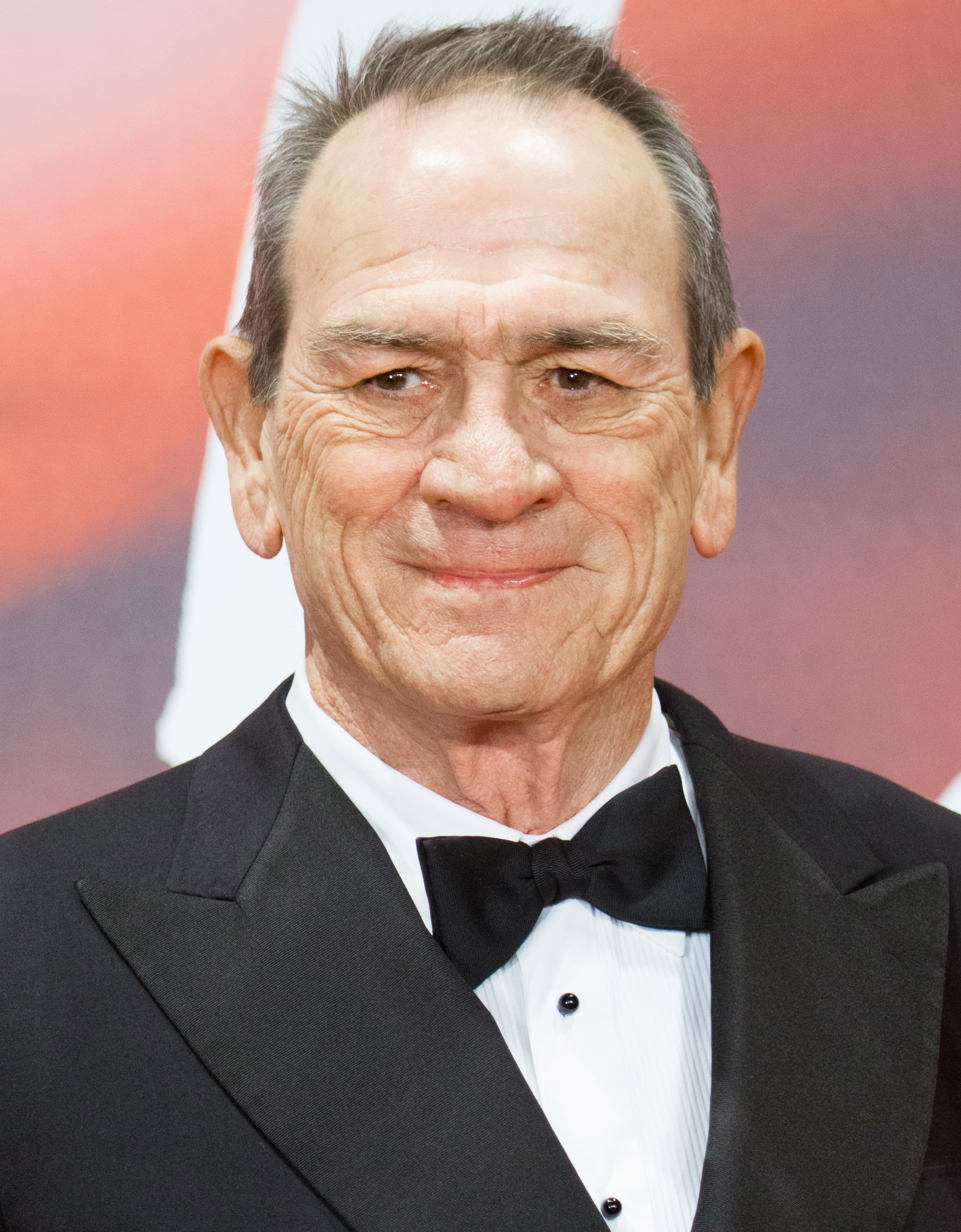
Actor Tommy Lee Jones was an All-Ivy League guard for the Crimson.

Below are Crimson football players who became notable for reasons other than football. Included is notability, position at Harvard, and any accomplishments while playing.

- Tommy Lee Jones, actor, guard (1965–1968), 1st team All-Ivy League 1968
- Christopher Nowinski, former professional wrestler with WWE and current activist on concussions in sports; linebacker and defensive end (1996–1999); 2nd-team All-Ivy League 1999
- Michael O'Hare, actor, defensive tackle (1971–1974)
- Mehmet Oz, Administrator, Centers for Medicare and Medicaid Services; physician; television host; Linebacker (1979–1980)

== Future non-conference opponents ==
Announced schedules as of October 2, 2026.

2026	2027	2028	2029	2031	2032
at New Hampshire	at UC Davis	at Montana State		at UC Davis	at Richmond
Colgate	at Colgate	Wofford		Richmond	
Holy Cross					

== See also ==
- List of NCAA football teams by wins
- American football in the United States
- College football
