= Bert Waters =

American football player and coach (1871–1930)

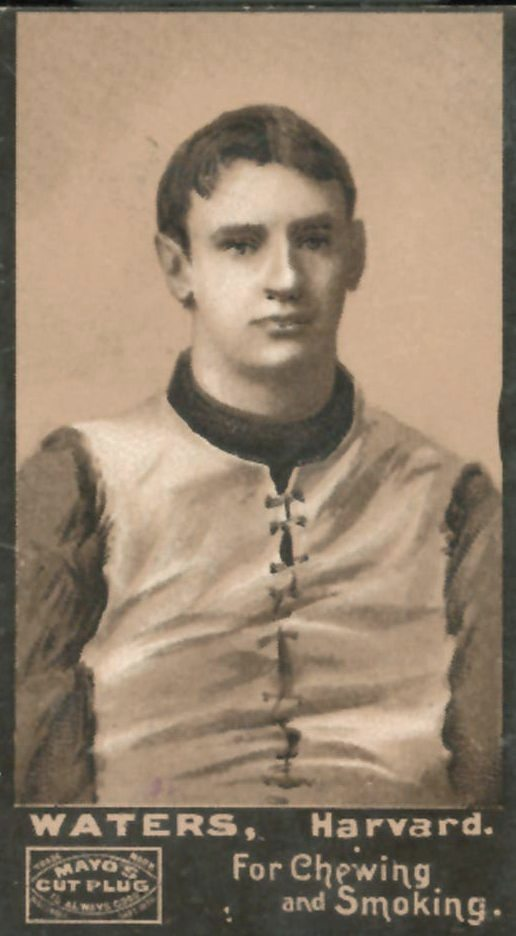

Biographical details
- Born: October 9, 1871; Boston, Massachusetts, U.S.
- Died: October 9, 1930 (aged 59); Lewiston, Maine, U.S.
- Education: Harvard University (1892)

Playing career
- 1892–1894: Harvard
- Positions: Guard, tackle

Coaching career (HC unless noted)
- 1896: Harvard

Head coaching record
- Overall: 7–4

Accomplishments and honors

Awards
- 2× consensus All-American (1892, 1894)

Bertram Gordon Waters (October 9, 1871 – October 9, 1930) was an American college football player and coach. He played for Harvard University from 1892 to 1894 and was selected as an All-American in 1892, as a guard, and again in 1894, as a tackle. Waters served as the head football coach for Harvard in 1896.

== Football player ==
A native of Boston, Waters attended the Boston Latin School before enrolling at Harvard. At Harvard, Waters played for the football team from 1891 to 1894. He played nearly every position on the football team, including tackle, guard, and halfback. Waters was selected as captain of the Harvard football team in 1893. He was also selected as an All-American at the guard position in 1892 and at the tackle position in 1894. In November 1893, The Philadelphia Inquirer reported that the 5-foot 11-inch, 180-pound Waters was the strongest player on the Harvard team and, with the exception of Marshall Newell, the best-developed. Waters played in the 1894 Harvard–Yale football game that became known as "The Bloodbath in Hampden Park." Several players were seriously injured, and Waters was accused of jabbing a finger into Frank Butterworth's eye. Administrators were so shocked by the violence that the next two years' Harvard–Yale games were cancelled.

Waters also played a role in the racial integration of college football in 1893. Waters was captain of the 1893 team, but injured his knee in the middle of the season's final game against Yale. In honor of the contributions of William H. Lewis, an African-American and future College Football Hall of Famer, Waters appointed him as team captain for the game. This was the first time that an African-American served as captain of a major college football team.

Waters also rowed for the crew while a student at Harvard.

== Football coach ==
After his college playing career ended, Waters attended the Boston University School of Law and worked as a coach for Harvard's football team. He was Harvard's head coach for the 1896 season. In 1896, the Trenton Evening Times reported: "Bert Waters is pronounced to be the best foot ball coach Harvard has ever had. He plays no favorites and picks out the best players, regardless of social standing." After a disappointing 1896 season, Waters was replaced as head coach by Billy Brooks, but he remained on the Harvard coaching staff as an assistant coach. In 1897, The New York Times wrote

Whether as head coach, last year, he overtrained the team or not, his help was just what was needed after the Bowdoin game to pull the team together. On Thursday, he came on the field in his football clothes, was behind every play, often getting into the scramble himself, and kept the men in splendid spirits by his cheery voice and presence. There is not another coach in the country that can make a team work like Bert Waters.

== Later life ==
After his coaching career ended in the late 1890s, Waters became a successful attorney. He continued to follow football, and when calls were made to eradicate the sport from university campuses, Waters spoke in defense of the game

Mr. Waters played the game as hard as it was ever played, and hasn't applied for a place in the invalids home yet. ... "It was a great sport and I consider football the best of all athletic games. It hardens a man for emergencies, puts snap and confidence in him, which he retains in after life."

In 1908, Waters was married in New Canaan, Connecticut, to Helen Kent Shaw. He died on October 9, 1930, in Lewiston, Maine.

== Head coaching record ==
| Year | Team | Overall | Conference | Standing | Bowl/playoffs |
|---|---|---|---|---|---|
Harvard Crimson (Independent) (1896–1897)
| 1896 | Harvard | 7–4 | | | |
| Harvard: | | 7–4 | | | |
| Total: | | 7–4 | | | |
