= Harry Thayer (American football, born 1873) =

American football player (1873–1936)

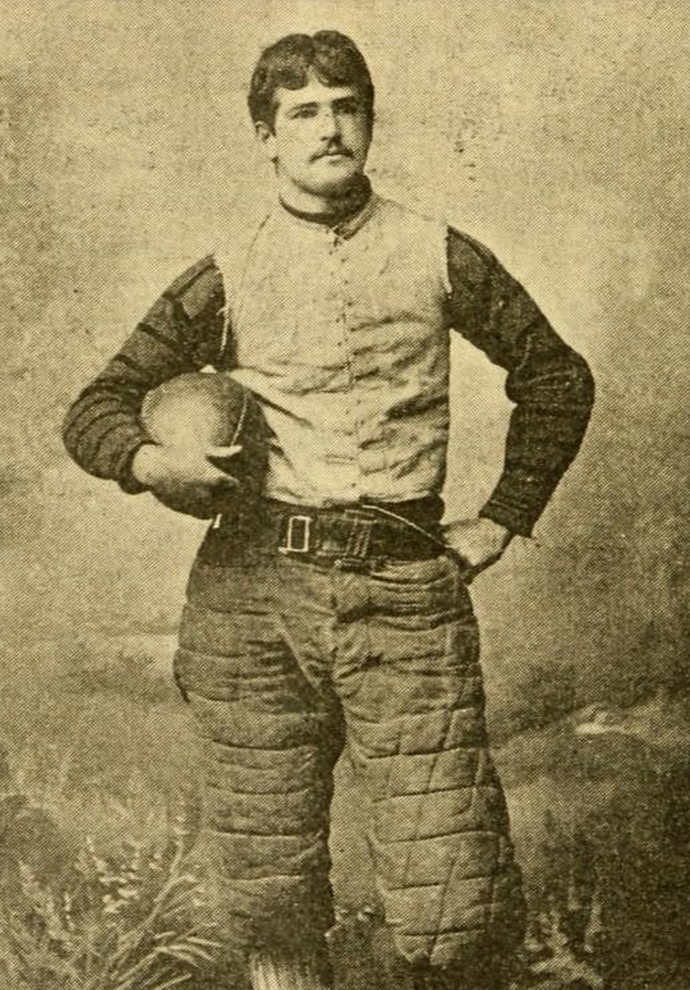
- Harry C. Thayer c. 1893

Profile
- Positions: Fullback, halfback

Personal information
- Born: December 31, 1873; Philadelphia, Pennsylvania, U.S.
- Died: August 4, 1936 (aged 62); Haverford, Pennsylvania, U.S.

Career information
- College: Penn (1891–1892)

Awards and highlights
- Consensus All-American (1892)

Harry Chapman Thayer (December 31, 1873 – August 4, 1936) was an All-American football player and broker. He was selected as a first-team halfback on the 1892 All-America college football team.

== Early life ==
Thayer was born in Philadelphia in 1873. He attended the Haverford School in Haverford, Pennsylvania.

== University of Pennsylvania ==
Thayer then attended the University of Pennsylvania where he played at the halfback and fullback positions for the Penn Quakers football teams in 1891 to 1892. At the end of the 1892 season, Thayer was selected by both Walter Camp and Caspar Whitney as a first-team halfback on the 1892 All-America college football team.

== Later life ==
Thayer later worked as a broker associated with the brokerage firms of West and Co and, later, Montgomery, Scott and Co. He also served as president of the Better Business Bureau and as president of the Philadelphia Association of New York Stock Exchange firms. He gained fame as the leader of a campaign to eliminate "bucket shops" from the brokerage business.

After an illness of more than a year, Thayer died at his home in Haverford in 1936 at age 63.

Thayer was married to the former Mary M. Sidebotham. She died in an automobile accident two weeks after her husband.
