= 1892 All-America college football team =

List of the best college football players of 1892

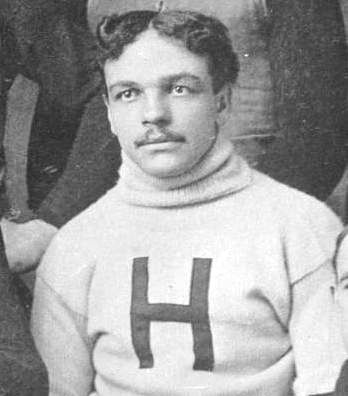
William H. Lewis of Harvard became the first African-American All-American in 1892.

The 1892 All-America college football team was composed of college football players who were selected as the best players at their respective positions for the 1892 college football season, as selected by Caspar Whitney for Harper's Weekly and Walter Camp. Whitney began publishing his All-America team in 1889, and his list, which was considered the official All-America team, was published in Harper's Weekly from 1891 to 1896. Harvard Law School student and football center William H. Lewis became the first African-American to be selected as an All-American in 1892, an honor he would receive again in 1893.

== All-American selections for 1892 ==
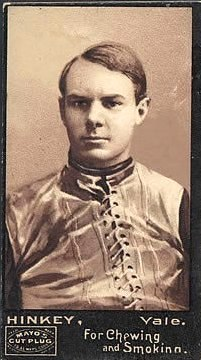
Frank Hinkey of Yale.

=== Key ===
- WC = Walter Camp
- CW = Caspar Whitney, published in Harper's Weekly magazine.
- **Bold** = Consensus All-American

=== Ends ===
- **Frank Hinkey**, Yale (College Football Hall of Fame) (WC, CW)
- **Frank Hallowell**, Harvard (WC, CW)

=== Tackles ===
- **Alexander Hamilton Wallis**, Yale (WC, CW)
- **Marshall Newell**, Harvard (College Football Hall of Fame) (WC, CW)

=== Guards ===
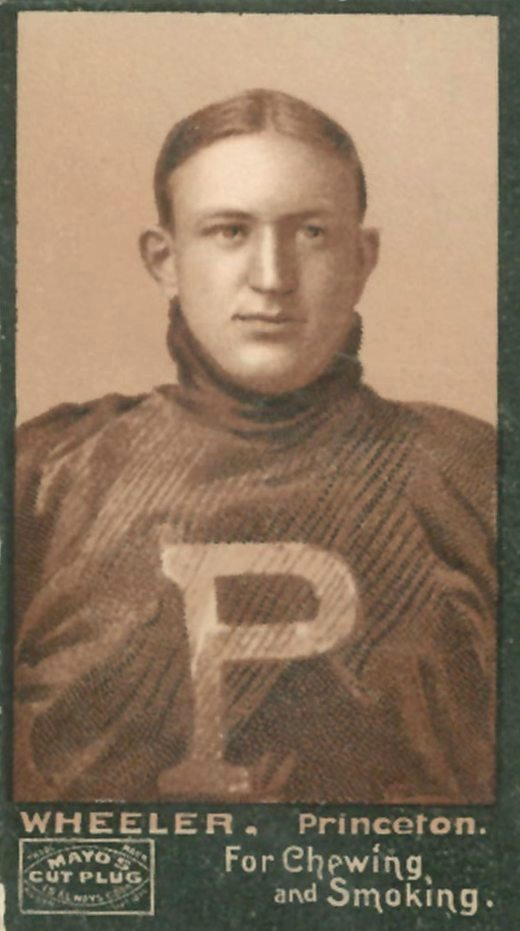
Art Wheeler of Princeton

- **Art Wheeler**, Princeton (College Football Hall of Fame) (WC, CW)
- **Bert Waters**, Harvard (WC)

=== Centers ===
- **William H. Lewis**, Harvard (first African-American All-American) (WC, CW)

=== Quarterback ===
- **Philip King**, Princeton (College Football Hall of Fame) (WC, CW)

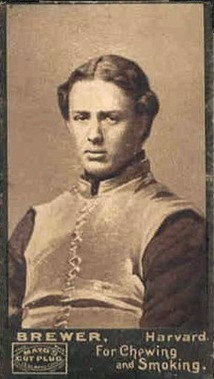
Charley Brewer of Harvard

=== Halfbacks ===
- **Vance McCormick**, Yale (WC, CW)
- **Harry Thayer**, Penn (WC, CW)

=== Fullbacks ===
- **Charley Brewer**, Harvard (College Football Hall of Fame) (WC, CW)
