= 1893 All-America college football team =

List of the best college football players of 1893

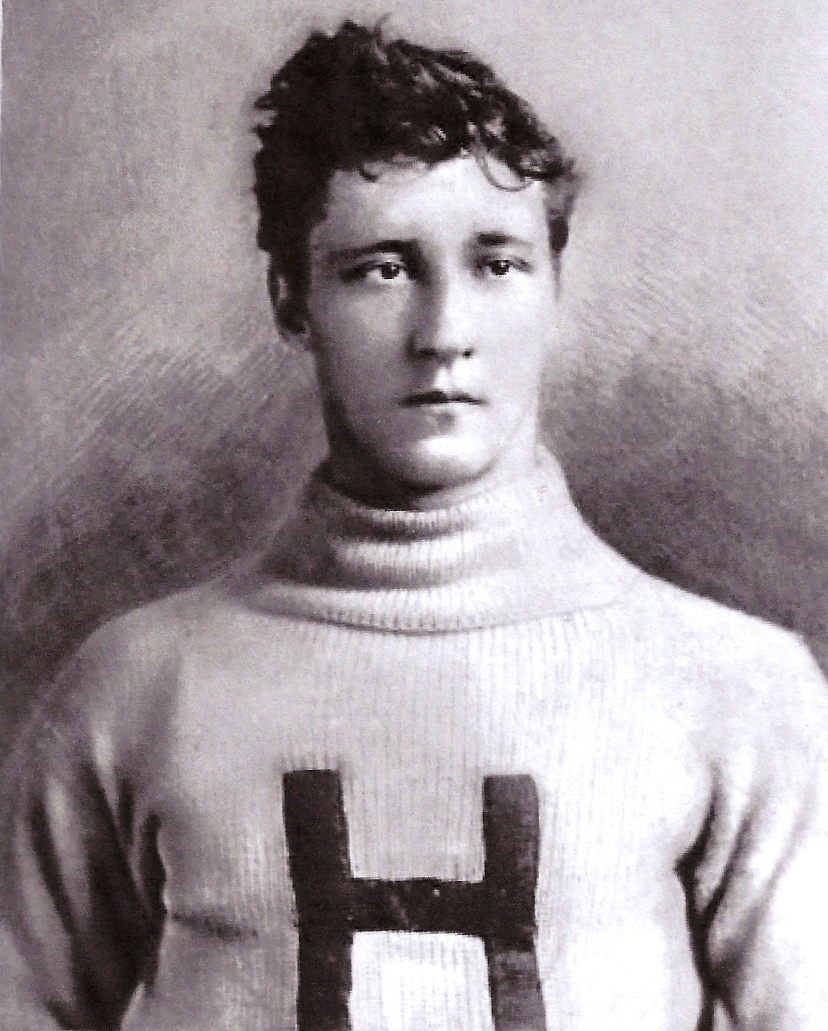
Marshall Newell of Harvard

The 1893 All-America college football team is composed of college football players who were selected as All-Americans for the 1893 college football season, as selected by Caspar Whitney for Harper's Weekly and the Walter Camp Football Foundation. Whitney began publishing his All-America Team in 1889, and his list, which was considered the official All-America Team, was published in Harper's Weekly from 1891 to 1896. Harvard Law School student and football center William H. Lewis became the first African-American to be selected as an All-American in 1892, an honor he received again in 1893.

== All-American selections for 1893 ==
=== Key ===
- WC = Walter Camp Football Foundation
- CW = Caspar Whitney, published in Harper's Weekly magazine.
- **Bold** = Consensus All-American

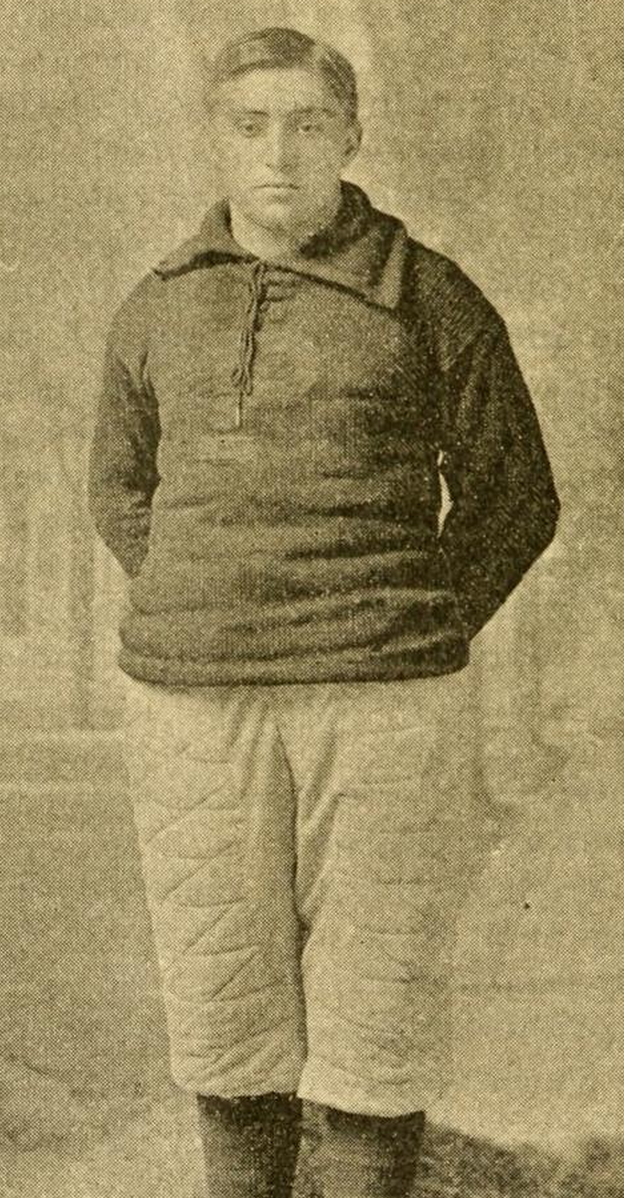
Thomas Trenchard of Princeton.

=== Ends ===
- **Frank Hinkey**, Yale (College Football Hall of Fame) (WC, CW)
- **Thomas Trenchard**, Princeton (WC, CW)

=== Tackles ===
- **Langdon Lea**, Princeton (College Football Hall of Fame) (WC, CW)
- **Marshall Newell**, Harvard (College Football Hall of Fame) (WC, CW)

=== Guards ===
- **Art Wheeler**, Princeton (College Football Hall of Fame) (WC, CW)
- **Bill Hickock**, Yale (College Football Hall of Fame) (WC)

=== Centers ===
- **William H. Lewis**, Harvard (first African-American All-American) (WC, CW)

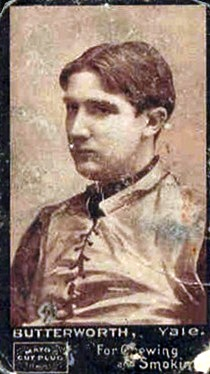
Frank Butterworth of Yale

=== Quarterback ===
- **Philip King**, Princeton (College Football Hall of Fame) (WC, CW)

=== Halfbacks ===
- **Franklin Morse**, Princeton (WC, CW)
- **Frank Butterworth**, Yale (WC, CW)

=== Fullbacks ===
- **Charley Brewer**, Harvard (College Football Hall of Fame) (WC, CW)
