= Newell Boathouse =

Harvard University boat storage facility

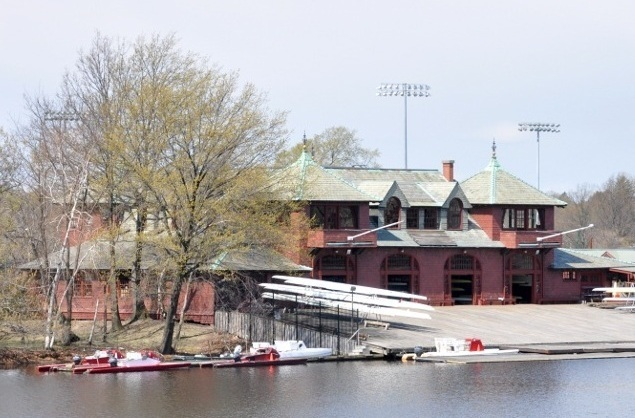

General information
- Type: Boathouse
- Location: Charles River
- Address: 801 Soldiers Field Rd.
- Town or city: Allston, Boston, Massachusetts
- Country: United States
- Coordinates: 42.3697°N 71.1258°W
- Named for: Marshall Newell
- Year(s) built: 1900
- Owner: Harvard University

Technical details
- Material: Concrete, slate

Design and construction
- Architect(s): Peabody and Stearns

Newell Boathouse is a boathouse on the Charles River in Boston, Massachusetts, United States. Named for a popular Harvard athlete killed just a few years after graduation, is the primary boathouse used by Harvard University's varsity men's rowing teams. It stands on land subject to an unusual peppercorn lease agreement between Harvard and the Commonwealth of Massachusetts.

== History ==
Called "the elder statesman among Charles River boathouses," Newell Boathouse is named for 1894 Harvard College graduate Marshall Newell, a varsity rower and All-American football player in all four of his undergraduate years, "beloved by all those who knew him" and nicknamed "Ma" for the guidance he gave younger athletes. After Newell was killed in 1897, $2,000 was raised for a boathouse in his memory.

Built in 1900 on the south side of the Charles to a design by Peabody and Stearns (architect Robert Peabody having been rowing captain as a Harvard undergraduate), Newell Boathouse is constructed of concrete, with a slate façade and roof. It was Harvard's first permanent boathouse, replacing a series of wooden boathouses in the area. In addition to storage for racing shells, the building provides locker rooms, meeting and training rooms, and rowing tanks and other practice equipment. Architectural historian Bainbridge Bunting wrote that its "complex profile ... closely resembling that of Carey Cage reflected in the Charles in the early morning, has made it a landmark on the river."

== Site lease ==
The "prime riverfront space" upon which Newell Boathouse stands belongs to the Commonwealth of Massachusetts. In addition to having given the Commonwealth forty-six acres of land downriver, Harvard pays $1 per year for the right to maintain a boathouse on the site, under a lease running one thousand years, at the end of which time Harvard has the option to renew the lease for a further thousand years‍—‌an example of a peppercorn lease amounting to "virtual freehold."

== See also ==
- Peppercorn rent
