= William Hickok =

William Hickok may refer to:

- Bill Hickok (football), American football player and businessman
- William O. Hickok IV, member of the World Figure Skating Hall of Fame
- William Hickok (athlete), United States national shot put champion

Note: Wild Bill Hickok's given name was not William, but James.
