= Langdon Lea =

American football player and coach (1874–1937)

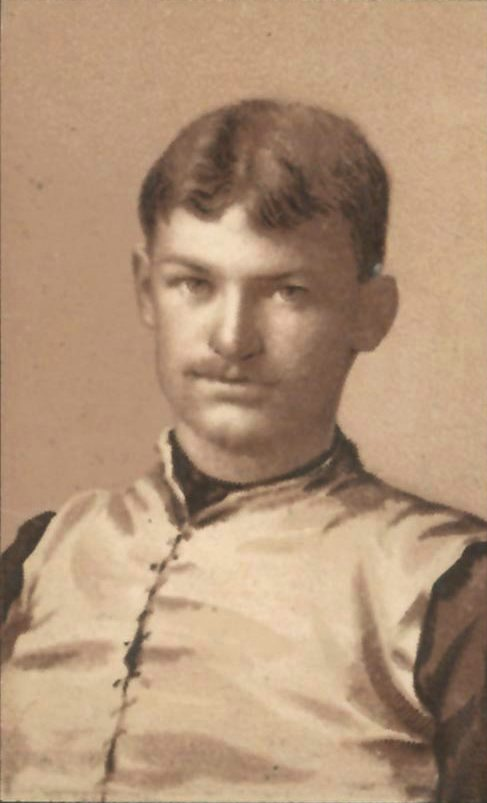

Biographical details
- Born: November 5, 1874; Philadelphia, Pennsylvania, U.S.
- Died: October 20, 1937 (aged 62); Paoli, Pennsylvania, U.S.

Playing career
- 1892–1895: Princeton
- Position: Tackle

Coaching career (HC unless noted)
- 1899: Princeton (unofficial)
- 1900: Michigan
- 1901: Princeton

Head coaching record
- Overall: 16–3–2

Accomplishments and honors

Awards
- 3× consensus All-American (1893, 1894, 1895)
- College Football Hall of Fame; Inducted in 1964 (profile)

Langdon "Biffy" Lea (May 11, 1874 – October 10, 1937) was an American college football player and coach. He played football at Princeton University, where he was selected as a first-team All-American at tackle three consecutive years, in 1893, 1894, and 1895. Lea He later served as head football coach at the University of Michigan in 1900 and at Princeton in 1901, compiling a career coaching record of 16–3–2. Lea was inducted into the College Football Hall of Fame as a player in 1964.

== Early life and playing career ==
Lea graduated from St. Paul's School in the 1892, and entered the scientific department of Princeton University in the fall of 1892. He first became famous as a football player in 1893 when he played a brilliant game against Winters of Yale on Thanksgiving. He played tackle for Princeton and became recognized as one of the best tackles ever to play the game. He was selected as a first-team All-American in 1893, 1894 and 1895.

== Coaching career ==
In 1899, Lea served as the unofficial head coach of the Princeton football team. In 1900, he was hired by the University of Michigan as its head football coach. A newspaper reported on expectations raised by his hiring at Michigan:

Coach Langdon Lea, the famous Prlncetonian, is expected to revolutionize affairs among the Wolverines and to raise the team to its old standing. The great trouble in the past few years has been the lack of efficient coaching, and it is hoped that Lea will supply that necessary.

Another newspaper reported on the hiring of Lea away from Princeton this way:

Langdon Lea, better known as 'Biffy,' is to coach the Michigan university team. This practice of putting well known eastern football players in charge of the teams of western universities has certainly improved the standard of play, and in many instances has often wrought havoc with the alma maters of the coaches. Some years ago the big eastern colleges tried to preven their graduates from accepting positions as coaches on other teams, but the fat salaries offered were inducements too great to be cast aside.

Lea led the 1900 Michigan Wolverines football team to a 7–2–1 record. However, the season was a disappointment as the Wolverines finished in fifth place in the Western Conference and lost to their principal rival, the University of Chicago, in the last game of the season. They also lost to the University of Iowa and played to a scoreless tie against Ohio State.

In 1901, Lea was selected to be the first "official" football coach of Princeton. A newspaper reported as follows on Lea's return to Princeton:

Last year he took hold of the University of Michigan football team and instilled such a knowledge of the game into the green material he had to work on that he is today acknowledged to be one of the greatest coaches in the country. He could have renewed his contract, said to be worth $4,000. for next season, but sacrificed this sum to become head coach at Princeton, a position not worth nearly so much and one which involves harder work and greater responsibility. ... Lea was appealed to and accepted the position. In his undergraduate days Lea was one of Old Nassau's stars. He was captain in 1895 and played the position of left tackle in such a manner as to gain a place on the All America team.

Lea was replaced at Michigan by Fielding H. Yost, who led the 1901 Michigan team to an 11–0 record, outscoring its opponents 550–0. Lea coached the 1901 Princeton Tigers football team to a 9–1–1 record.

== Family, death, and honors ==
Lea's three sons, Gilbert Lea (Class of 1936), Langdon Lea (Class of 1932), Jr., and Francis C. Lea (Class of 1927) all played end for Princeton.

Lea died at his home, in Paoli, Pennsylvania, at age 63 in 1937. He was interred at Laurel Hill Cemetery in Philadelphia. He was elected to the College Football Hall of Fame in 1964.

== Head coaching record ==
Year	Team	Overall	Conference	Standing	Bowl/playoffs
Michigan Wolverines (Western Conference) (1900)
1900	Michigan	7–2–1	3–2	5th	
Michigan:		7–2–1	3–2		
Princeton Tigers (Independent) (1901)
1901	Princeton	9–1–1			
Princeton:		9–1–1			
Total:		16–3–2			
