= 1894 All-America college football team =

List of the best college football players of 1894

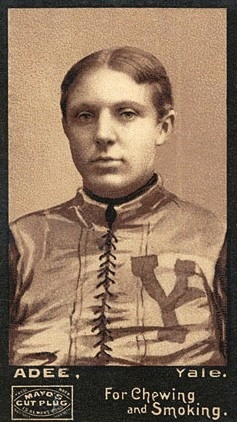
George Adee of Yale

The 1894 All-America college football team is composed of college football players who were selected as All-Americans for the 1894 college football season, as selected by Caspar Whitney for Harper's Weekly and the Walter Camp Football Foundation. Whitney began publishing his All-America Team in 1889, and his list, which was considered the official All-America Team, was published in Harper's Weekly from 1891 to 1896.

== All-American selections for 1894 ==
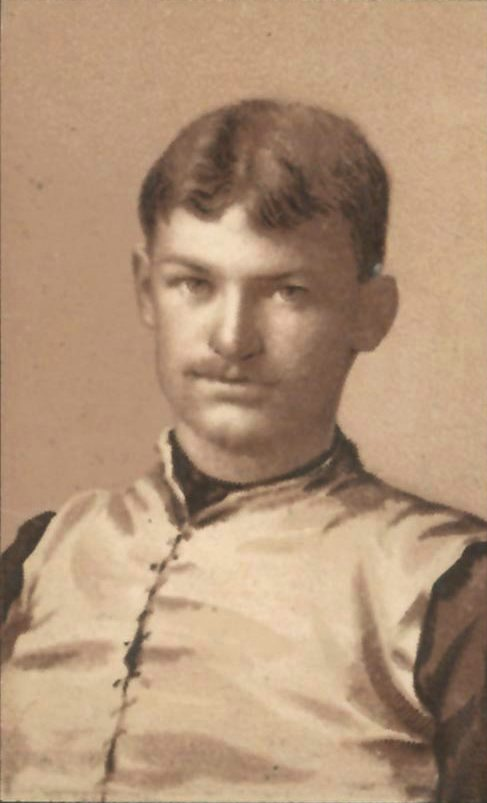
Langdon Lea of Princeton

=== Key ===
- WC = Walter Camp Football Foundation
- CW = Caspar Whitney, published in Harper's Weekly magazine.
- LES = Leslie's Weekly by John D. Merrill
- **Bold** = Consensus All-American

=== Ends ===
- **Frank Hinkey**, Yale (College Football Hall of Fame) (WC; CW; LES)
- **Charles Gelbert**, Penn (College Football Hall of Fame) (WC; CW; LES)

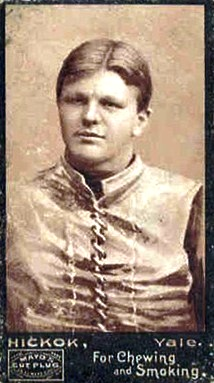
Bill Hickock of Yale.

=== Tackles ===
- **Bert Waters**, Harvard (WC; CW; LES)
- **Langdon Lea**, Princeton (College Football Hall of Fame) (WC; CW)
- Anson M. Beard, Yale (LES)

=== Guards ===
- **Art Wheeler**, Princeton (College Football Hall of Fame) (WC; CW)
- **Bill Hickock**, Yale (College Football Hall of Fame) (WC; CW)
- William C. Mackie, Harvard (LES)
- Charles Wharton, Penn (LES)

=== Centers ===
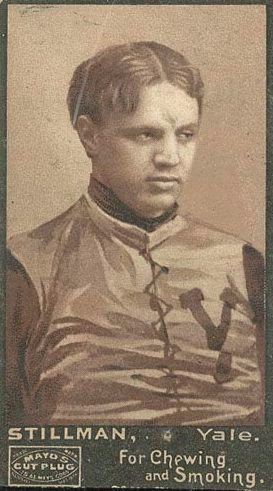
Phillip Stillman of Yale

- **Phillip Stillman**, Yale (WC; CW; LES)

=== Quarterback ===
- **George Adee**, Yale (WC; CW)
- Bob Wrenn, Harvard (LES)

=== Halfbacks ===
- **Alden Knipe**, Penn (WC; CW; LES)
- **George Brooke**, Penn (College Football Hall of Fame) (WC; CW; LES)

=== Fullback ===
- **Frank Butterworth**, Yale (WC; CW; LES)
