= Charley Brewer (fullback) =

American football player (1873–1958)

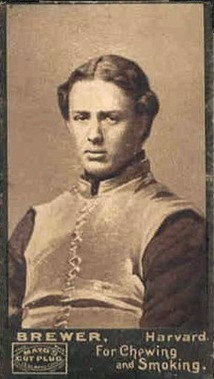

Profile
- Position: Fullback

Personal information
- Born: March 8, 1873; Honolulu, Hawaii, U.S.
- Died: June 13, 1958 (aged 85); Waltham, Massachusetts, U.S.

Career information
- College: Harvard (1892–1895)

Awards and highlights
- 3× Consensus All-American (1892, 1893, 1895)
- College Football Hall of Fame

Charley Brewer (March 8, 1873 – June 13, 1958) was an American football player. Brewer attended Harvard University, where he played for the Harvard Crimson football team. He was recognized as a consensus first-team All-American three times at the fullback position – in 1892, 1893, 1895.

He was inducted into the College Football Hall of Fame in 1971.
