= Frank Butterworth =

American football player and coach (1870–1950)

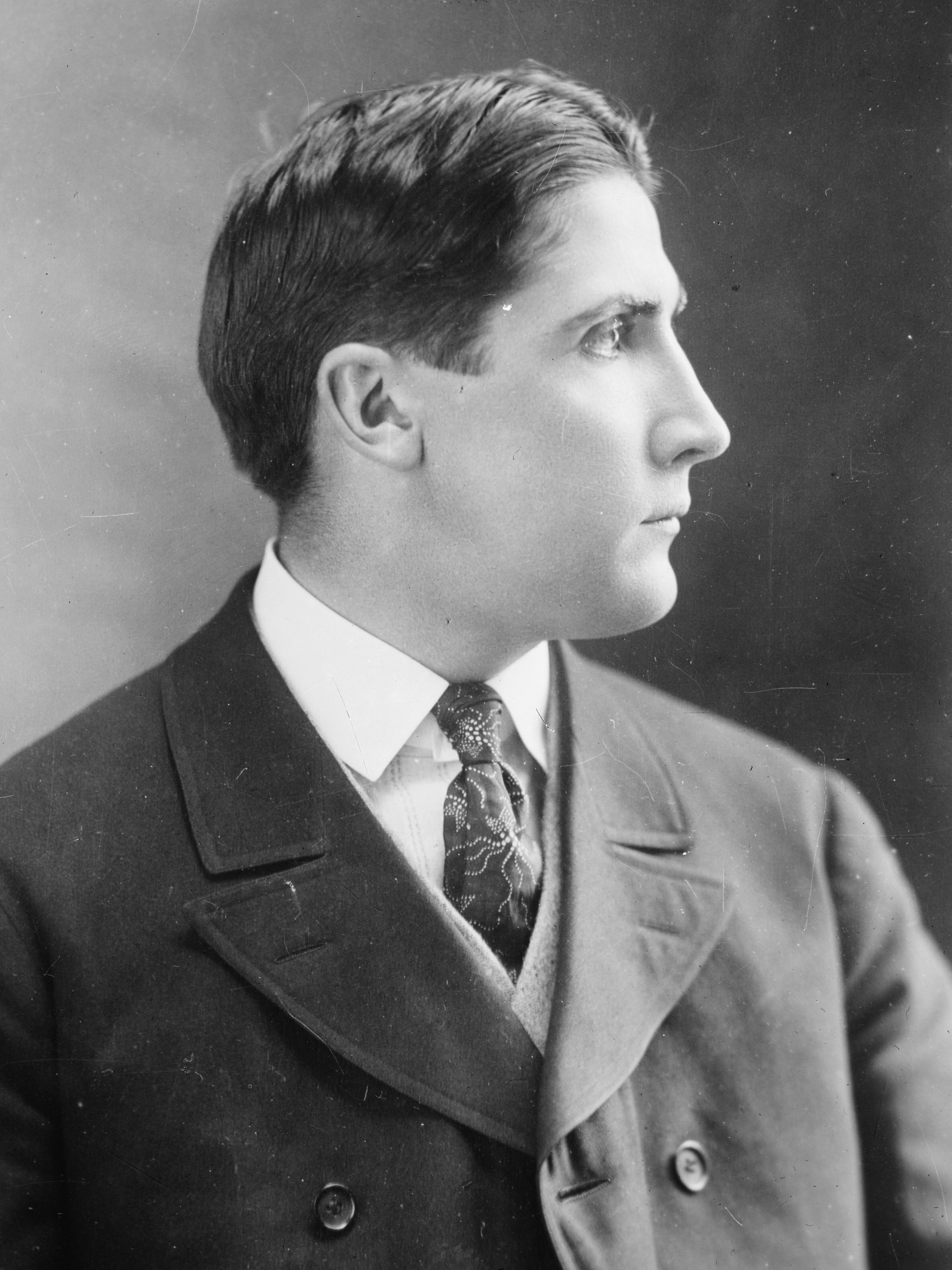

Biographical details
- Born: September 21, 1870; Warren County, Ohio, U.S.
- Died: August 22, 1950 (aged 79); Hamden, Connecticut, U.S.

Playing career
- 1892–1894: Yale
- Positions: Fullback, halfback

Coaching career (HC unless noted)
- 1895–1896: California
- 1897–1898: Yale

Head coaching record
- Overall: 27–5–5

Accomplishments and honors

Championships
- 1 national (1897)

Awards
- 2× consensus All-American (1893, 1894)

Frank Seiler Butterworth Sr. (September 21, 1870 – August 21, 1950) was an American college football player, coach, and state legislator.

Butterworth, a son of Ohio congressman Benjamin Butterworth, attended Yale University, where he was a fullback on Yale's football teams and a member of the Skull and Bones society. He was famously enucleated by Bert Waters during "The Bloodbath in Hampden Park". He was selected as an All-American in 1893 and 1894. Butterworth was also a track star and boxer at Yale. After his college career was over, Butterworth coached football at the University of California, Berkeley (1895–1896) and Yale (1897–1898). The 1897 Yale football team coached by Butterworth went undefeated with two ties, against Army and Harvard.

Butterworth worked for the bankers Bertron & Storrs, was a senior partner with real estate brokers F. S. Butterworth & Company, and was president of the New Haven Hotel Company. He served as a Connecticut State Senator from 1907 to 1909 and was a Second Lieutenant in the Chemical Warfare Service during World War I. Butterworth died in his sleep at age 79 in his home in Mount Carmel, Hamden, Connecticut.

== Head coaching record ==
Year	Team	Overall	Conference	Standing	Bowl/playoffs
California Golden Bears (Independent) (1895–1896)
1895	California	3–1–1			
1896	California	6–2–2			
California:		9–3–3			
Yale Bulldogs (Independent) (1897–1898)
1897	Yale	9–0–2			
1898	Yale	9–2			
Yale:		18–2–2			
Total:		27–5–5			
National championship Conference title Conference division title or championship game berth
