= Philip King (American football) =

American football player, coach, and lawyer (1872–1938)

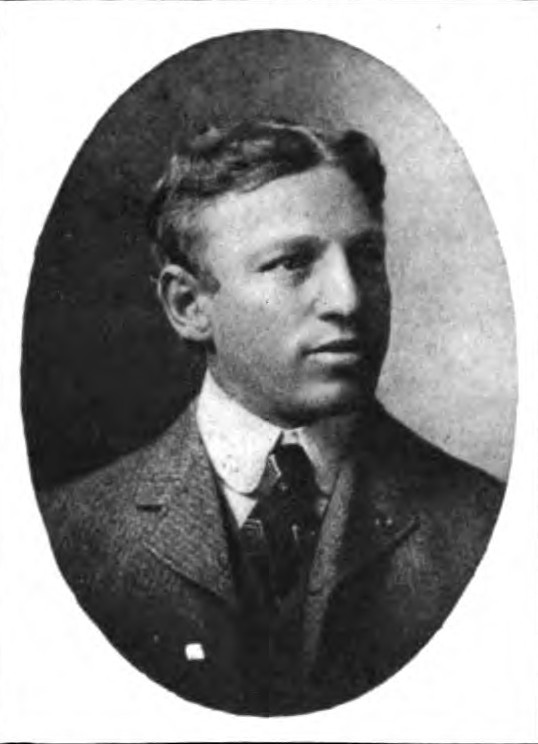

Biographical details
- Born: March 16, 1872; Washington, D.C., U.S.
- Died: January 7, 1938 (aged 65); Washington, D.C., U.S.

Playing career

Football
- 1890–1893: Princeton
- Position: Quarterback

Coaching career (HC unless noted)

Football
- 1896–1902: Wisconsin
- 1903: Georgetown
- 1905: Wisconsin

Baseball
- 1897: Wisconsin
- 1899: Georgetown
- 1900–1901: Wisconsin

Head coaching record
- Overall: 73–14–1 (football)

Accomplishments and honors

Championships
- 3 Western (1896, 1897, 1901)

Awards
- 3× Consensus All-American (1891, 1892, 1893)
- College Football Hall of Fame; Inducted in 1962 (profile)

Philip King (March 16, 1872 – January 7, 1938) was an American college football player and coach, college baseball coach, and lawyer. He played quarterback for the Princeton Tigers football team of Princeton University from 1890 to 1893, and was selected to the College Football All-America Team in 1891, 1892, and 1893. After his playing days, he served as the head football coach at the University of Wisconsin–Madison from 1896 to 1902 and again in 1905, and at Georgetown University in 1903, compiling a career college football head coaching record of 73–14–1. He was inducted into the College Football Hall of Fame as a player in 1962.

== Early life ==
King, who was Jewish, was born in Washington, D.C.

== Coaching career ==
At Wisconsin, King compiled a 66–11–1 (.853) record. The Badgers had four nine-win seasons during his tenure. King's 1896 and 1897 teams won the first two football championships of the Big Ten Conference, then known as the Western Conference. King's 1901 Wisconsin team went 9–0, outscored its opponents 317–5, and tied with Michigan for another conference title. His 66 wins was the most of any head coach in program history until Barry Alvarez passed him in 1999.

In 1903, King guided the Georgetown Blue and Gray to a 7–3 record.

== Head coaching record ==
=== Football ===
Year	Team	Overall	Conference	Standing	Bowl/playoffs
Wisconsin Badgers (Western Conference) (1896–1902)
1896	Wisconsin	7–1–1	2–0–1	1st	
1897	Wisconsin	9–1	3–0	1st	
1898	Wisconsin	9–1	2–1	3rd	
1899	Wisconsin	9–2	4–1	2nd	
1900	Wisconsin	8–1	2–1	3rd	
1901	Wisconsin	9–0	2–0	T–1st	
1902	Wisconsin	6–3	1–3	6th	
Georgetown Blue and Gray (Independent) (1903)
1903	Georgetown	7–3			
Georgetown:		7–3			
Wisconsin Badgers (Big Ten Conference) (1905)
1905	Wisconsin	8–2	1–2	5th	
Wisconsin:		66–11–1	17–8–1		
Total:		73–14–1			
National championship Conference title Conference division title or championship game berth

== See also ==
- List of college football head coaches with non-consecutive tenure
