= Bill Hickok (American football) =

American football player and industrialist (1874–1933)

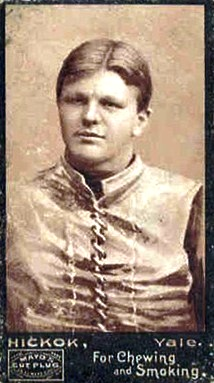
- Mayo's Cut Plug football card of Bill Hickok, issued 1894

Biographical details
- Born: August 23, 1874; Harrisburg, Pennsylvania, U.S.
- Died: September 4, 1933 (aged 59); Harrisburg, Pennsylvania, U.S.

Playing career
- 1892–1894: Yale
- Position: Guard

Coaching career (HC unless noted)
- 1897: Carlisle

Head coaching record
- Overall: 5–5

Accomplishments and honors

Awards
- 2× consensus All-American (1893, 1894)
- College Football Hall of Fame; Inducted in 1971 (profile)

William Orville "Wild Bill" Hickok III (August 23, 1874 – September 4, 1933) was an American college football player and industrialist. Inevitably nicknamed "Wild Bill" for the folk hero of the American Old West, and also known as "Hickey," he starred at Yale University in track as well as football and was eventually inducted into the College Football Hall of Fame. After his athletic career, he became the president of his family's manufacturing business.

== Early years ==
Hickok was born in Harrisburg, Pennsylvania, to William Orville Hickok Jr., and Louisa Harrison Anderson Hickok. The family was prominent in Harrisburg civic life through his grandfather's machinery business, W.O. Hickok Manufacturing Company.

== Yale University ==
Bill played guard at Yale and was twice selected as an All-American. In addition, he set records in the shot put and hammer throw for the track team.

== Coaching career ==
=== Carlisle ===
After completing his studies, Hickok returned to Pennsylvania. In 1896 he was asked by another Yale graduate from Harrisburg, Vance McCormick, to coach the football team McCormick had organized at the nearby Carlisle Indian School. The team went 5-5 against a challenging schedule that included the leading Ivy League powers.

For the game against his alma mater, Hickok also served as a referee (a common practice at the time) along with an official provided by the Yale side. In a memorable moment, the Indians appeared to have scored a late touchdown to potentially tie the game when one of their players broke free with a handoff after the team's halfback had dived into the line. However, Hickok blew his whistle to call it back on the grounds that the play was dead prior to the handoff, causing his own team to protest. One newspaper covering the contest would compare his action to that of a corrupt Indian agent.

== Hickok Manufacturing Company ==
Other than serving as an assistant coach at Yale, Hickok spent most of his remaining life in Harrisburg. He married Avis Cochran and eventually served as president of the Hickok Manufacturing Company. After his death in 1933, the position passed to his brother Ross.

== Head coaching record ==
Year	Team	Overall	Conference	Standing	Bowl/playoffs
Carlisle Indians (Independent) (1896)
1896	Carlisle	5–5			
Carlisle:		5–5			
Total:		5–5			
