= Art Wheeler =

American football player (1872–1917)

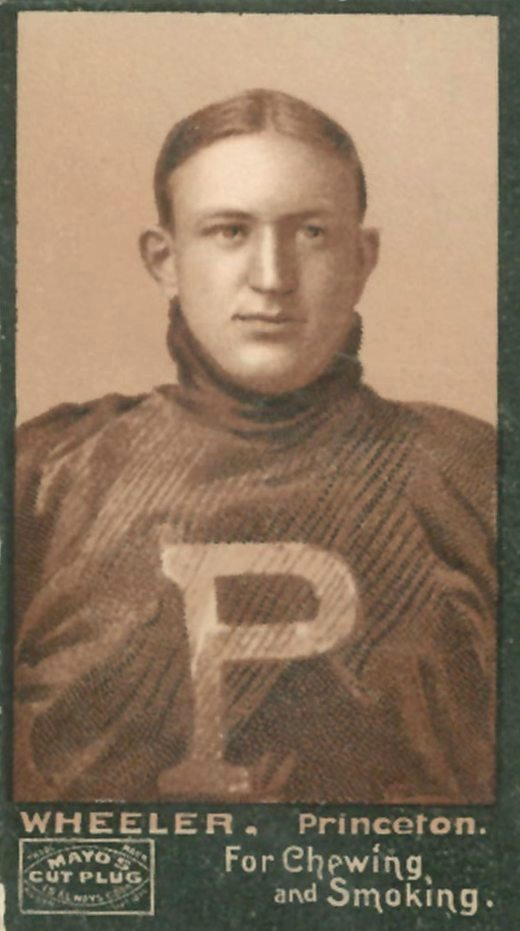

Profile
- Position: Guard

Personal information
- Born: May 12, 1872; Philadelphia, Pennsylvania, U.S.
- Died: December 20, 1917 (aged 45); Philadelphia, Pennsylvania, U.S.
- Listed height: 6 ft 1 in (1.85 m)
- Listed weight: 200 lb (91 kg)

Career information
- College: Princeton (1891–1894)

Awards and highlights
- 3× consensus All-American (1892, 1893, 1894)
- College Football Hall of Fame (Class of 1969)

Arthur Ledlie Wheeler (May 12, 1872 – December 20, 1917) was an American college football player. He played as a Guard at Princeton University, where earned consensus All-American honors three times, in 1892, 1893, and 1894. Wheeler was inducted into the College Football Hall of Fame in 1969.

A severely injured Wheeler was historically photographed along with two other Princeton students from the aftermath of a snowball fight in 1893.

== Personal life and death ==
Wheeler was born on May 12, 1872, in Philadelphia, to Andrew and Sarah Caroline Wheeler. After graduating from Princeton in 1896, he worked in banking and real estate in Philadelphia. Wheeler died of heart disease, on December 20, 1917, at the Racquet Club of Philadelphia.
