= Frank Hinkey =

American football player and coach (1870–1925)

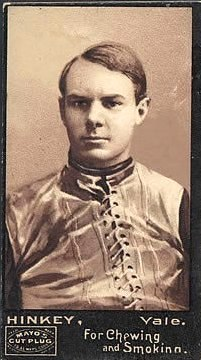
- Hinkey's football card from 1894

Biographical details
- Born: December 23, 1870; Tonawanda, New York, U.S.
- Died: December 30, 1925 (aged 55); Southern Pines, North Carolina, U.S.

Playing career
- 1891–1894: Yale
- Position: End

Coaching career (HC unless noted)
- 1914–1915: Yale

Head coaching record
- Overall: 11–7

Accomplishments and honors

Awards
- 4× Consensus All-American (1891–1894); Camp All-time All-America team; Referee, World Series of Football (1903)
- College Football Hall of Fame; Inducted in 1951 (profile)

Frank Augustus Hinkey (December 23, 1870 – December 30, 1925) was an American college football player and coach. He was notable for being one of only five college football players in history to be named a four-time consensus All-American. He was elected to the College Football Hall of Fame in 1951.

== Biography ==
=== Early years ===
Frank Hinkey was born in Tonawanda, New York, he attended DeVeaux College and Phillips Andover.

=== Yale University ===
While attending Yale University, he played for the Yale Bulldogs football team for four years, was captain his junior and senior years, and each year was named to the College Football All-America Team. One writer claims "when all-time ends are named, Hinkey invariably heads the list." He graduated from Yale University in 1895 and was a member of Psi Upsilon and Skull and Bones.

=== Business career ===
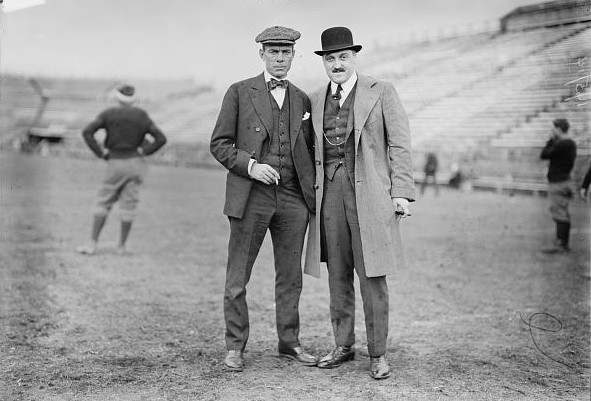
Hinkey (left) and Tom Shevlin

He ran several businesses, including zinc smelting plants in Kansas and Illinois, and worked with fellow Yale teammate and All-American Frank Butterworth at a brokerage. He was head coach of the Yale team from 1914 to 1915. During those two seasons, he had an 11–7 record.

=== Referee ===
According to Dr. Harry March's often inaccurate book Pro Football: Its Ups and Downs, Hinkey was a referee at the 1903 World Series of Football held at Madison Square Garden. March states that the officials during the series "were dressed in full evening dress, from top hats down to white gloves and patent leather shoes." During the last play of the series in a game between the Franklin Athletic Club and the Watertown Red & Black, the Franklin players, knew that they had the game in hand. As a result, the Franklin backfield agreed to purposely run over the clean and sharply dressed Hinkey in jest, knocking him into the dirt. Hinkey took the incident in good-nature and Franklin's management agreed to pay his cleaning bill.

=== Death and legacy ===
Hinkey died from complications of tuberculosis on December 30, 1925, in Southern Pines, North Carolina, at age 55.

Hinkey was inducted into the College Football Hall of Fame in 1951.

In 1969, in honor of the centennial of collegiate football, the Football Writers Association of America named two "College Football All-Time Teams" of eleven players — an "early" team consisting of players who played prior to 1920, and a "modern" team who played in 1920 and after. Hinkey was selected as one of two ends on the pre-1920 squad.

== Head coaching record ==
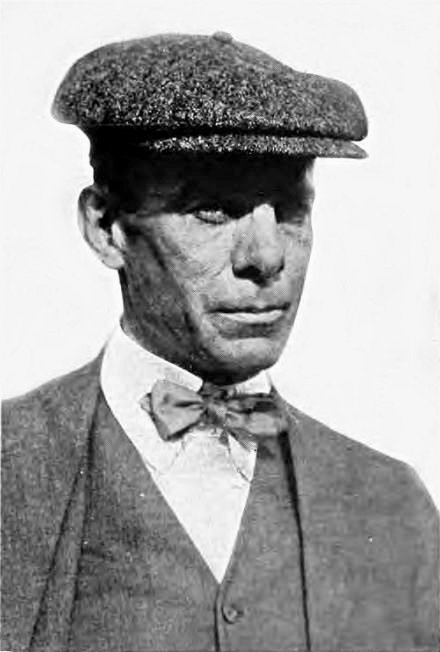
Frank Hinkey from American Football book.

Year	Team	Overall	Conference	Standing	Bowl/playoffs
Yale Bulldogs (Independent) (1914–1915)
1914	Yale	7–2			
1915	Yale	4–5			
Yale:		11–7			
Total:		11–7			
