= Chester L. Washington =

American journalist

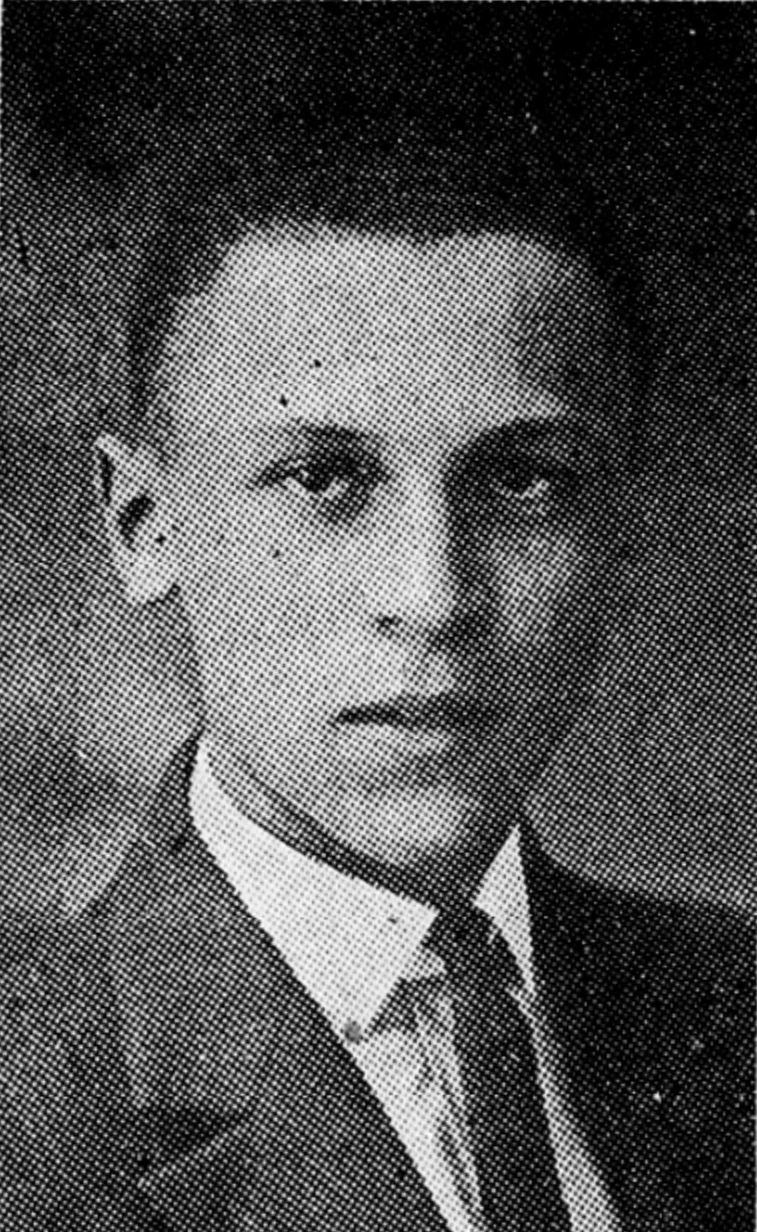
- Washington in 1924
- Born: Chester Lloyd Washington Jr. April 13, 1902; Pittsburgh, Pennsylvania, U.S.
- Died: August 31, 1983 (aged 81); Culver City, California, U.S.
- Occupations: Journalist, writer, newspaper publisher

Chester Lloyd Washington Jr. (April 13, 1902 – August 31, 1983) was an American journalist, newspaper publisher and editor. He was owner of Central News-Wave Publications, which at one time published over a dozen newspapers.

== Biography ==
Washington was born in Allegheny County, Pennsylvania, on April 13, 1902, the second child and oldest son of Chester Lloyd Washington Sr., a mail carrier, and his wife, the former Bessie Willis, a homemaker.

Washington began his newspaper career in the 1920s as a stenographer and journalist in his hometown of Pittsburgh, Pennsylvania. He went on to serve as sports editor of the Pittsburgh Courier.

In 1955, Washington became the first African-American news employee at the Los Angeles Mirror-News. When the paper ceased publication in 1962, he went to work for the Los Angeles Sentinel, the city's largest black-owned weekly, where he became editor in charge.

Four years later, he began his publishing career with the purchase of the Central News and Southwest News, two weeklies in Los Angeles. Over the course of several years, Washington purchased a number of additional papers to create the 13-newspaper Central News-Wave Publications.

On March 18, 1982, Los Angeles County Supervisor Kenneth Hahn dedicated the former Western Avenue Golf Course in Washington's honor. Located at the corner of Western Avenue and 120th Street in the unincorporated community of West Athens, adjacent to Los Angeles, the Chester L. Washington Golf Course was one of the first public golf courses in Los Angeles to allow black people to play.

Washington died August 31, 1983, of cancer at the Marina Convalescent Hospital in Culver City, California. He is interred at the Lincoln Memorial Park Cemetery in Carson, California.
