= Marshall Newell =

American football player and coach (1871–1897)

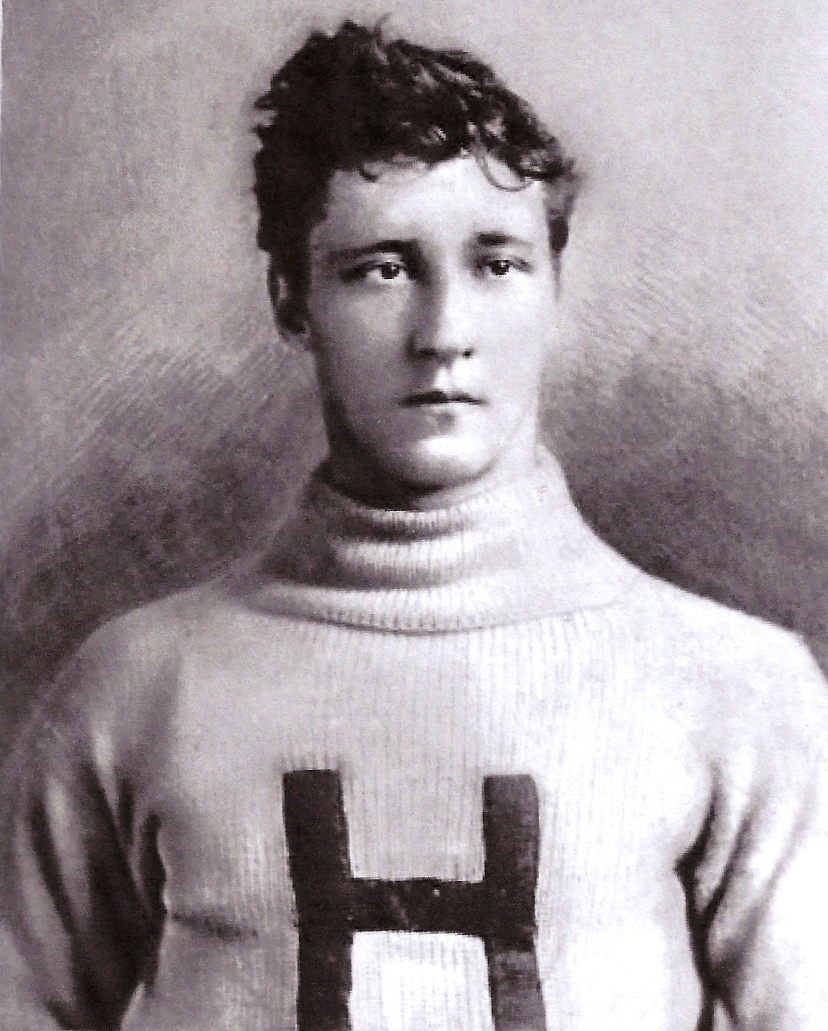
- Newell in 1898

Biographical details
- Born: April 2, 1871; Clifton, New Jersey, U.S.
- Died: December 24, 1897 (aged 26); Springfield, Massachusetts, U.S.

Playing career
- 1890–1893: Harvard
- Position: Tackle

Coaching career (HC unless noted)
- 1894–1895: Cornell
- 1896: Tufts

Head coaching record
- Overall: 9–8–2

Accomplishments and honors

Awards
- 4× Consensus All-American (1890–1893)
- College Football Hall of Fame; Inducted in 1957 (profile)

Marshall "Ma" Newell (April 2, 1871 – December 24, 1897) was an American college football player and coach, "beloved by all those who knew him" and nicknamed "Ma" for the guidance he gave younger athletes. After his sudden and early death, Harvard University's Newell Boathouse was built in his memory. He was elected to the College Football Hall of Fame in 1957.

== Early life and education ==
Newell was born on April 2, 1871 in Clifton, New Jersey, the son of Samuel Newell, a prominent lawyer. He grew up on a farm near Great Barrington, Massachusetts, in the Berkshires. He enrolled at Phillips Exeter Academy in Exeter, New Hampshire in 1887 and graduated in 1890.

=== Harvard University ===
Newell gained admittance to Harvard University, where he became an All-American football player for the Harvard Crimson football team. Nicknamed "Ma" Newell, he played right tackle for the Harvard football team from 1890 to 1893. Newell stood 5 feet, 10 inches, weighed approximately 170 pounds, and played every minute of every game for Harvard from 1890 to 1893. During his four years on the team, Harvard had a record of 46–3 (including 38 shutouts) and outscored opponents 1,926 to 95. The New York World wrote the following about Newell in 1892:

Marshall Newell is one of Harvard's stone wall stand-bys at right tackle, where he has played for three years. He is a man of most remarkable muscular development, a phenomenally hard worker, and a man of whom Harvard men may well be proud. In breaking through the line and nipping plays in the bud he is as good as ... Winter, with whom he will lock horns. In blocking the Harvard man is the better, but in running with the ball Winter is superior.

Newell was selected as an All-American in all four years at Harvard, one of only four players in the history of college football to be named as an All-American in all four years of collegiate play.

Newell was known as "a deeply sensitive man, a compassionate fellow of heart and understanding in complete contrast to the ferocity with which he played the game of football." On the field, Newell was known for "his tremendous leg-drive and steel-trap grip in tackling enemy runners." Newell was also known for his love of the outdoors and became an amateur naturalist.

He also competed on Harvard's varsity crew (rowing team) from 1891 to 1893. An 1893 newspaper article described Newell's contribution to the crew as follows:

He is a wonderfully able athlete, having played a cyclonic tackle on three Harvard elevens and rowed bow on two university crews, '91 and '92. His muscle is fairly a burden to him, and with his great strength he is rather a stiff and awkward oarsman. His bladework is apt to be ragged."

While at Harvard, Newell was also a member of the Institute of 1770, The Dickey Club, Hasty Pudding Club and Signet.

== Career ==
=== Cornell University coach ===
After graduating from Harvard in the spring of 1894, Newell became the head football coach at Cornell University in 1894 and 1895. The captain of the 1894 team was Glenn Scobey "Pop" Warner. Newell's coaching record at Cornell was 9–8–2. When he left after a 22–0 victory over Michigan in his first year coaching at Cornell, The Syracuse Standard wrote:

Marshall Newell, the Harvard man to whose coaching Cornell owes much of her success this year, left to-night for Harvard. He will probably not return this year to Ithaca again this year. He was given a rousing send off by the students, nearly 1,000 surrounding him as he made his way to the station. Newell made a short speech to the students after the game, in which he...predicted that if the present enthusiasm in football was continued Cornell would soon be ranked with Harvard, Yale, and Princeton.

=== Boston and Albany Railroad ===
In December 1896, Newell became an assistant division superintendent of the Boston and Albany Railroad.

== Death ==
On Christmas Eve 1897, Newell was killed when an engine backed over him in Springfield, Massachusetts. He was interred in the Newell family plot in the Walnut Hill section of Medford, Massachusetts.

== Memorials and honors ==
After Newell's death, Harvard alumni donated $2,000 to construct a new boathouse on the Charles River for use by the crew and named the Newell Boathouse. The tribute was completed in 1916. In addition, Gate No. 1 at Harvard Stadium was renamed the Newell Gate in his honor.

In 1928, syndicated sports writer Peg Murray recalled Newell as a "Pillar of Strength" and perhaps the greatest tackle in the history of the game:

Among the great tackles of history, the name of Marshall Newell, of Harvard, stands out, not only for his fine playing, but also because of his wonderful character and the influence he exerted over those with whom he came in contact with as a player and a coach. He was a whirlwind in action, a player of phenomenal strength, and made Walter Camp's All-American team for four years, from 1890 to '93 inclusive. Newell, nicknamed 'Ma' back in his Phillips Exeter days, could use his hands as cleverly as Jim Driscoll, and was a master of position play ... Newell was beloved by all those that knew him, respected by his opponents as a true sportsman, and his tragic death in 1897 was mourned by thousands of friends. No more high-principled player ever lived ...

John Heisman, the namesake of the Heisman Trophy, selected Newell as his pick for the greatest football player of all time. Newell was inducted into the College Football Hall of Fame in 1957. In 1967, he was one of the first group inducted into the Harvard Varsity Club Hall of Fame.

== Head coaching record ==
Year	Team	Overall	Conference	Standing	Bowl/playoffs
Cornell Big Red (Independent) (1894–1895)
1894	Cornell	6–4–1			
1895	Cornell	3–4–1			
Cornell:		9–8–2			
Total:		9–8–2			
