= Caspar Whitney =

American author, editor, explorer, outdoorsman and war correspondent

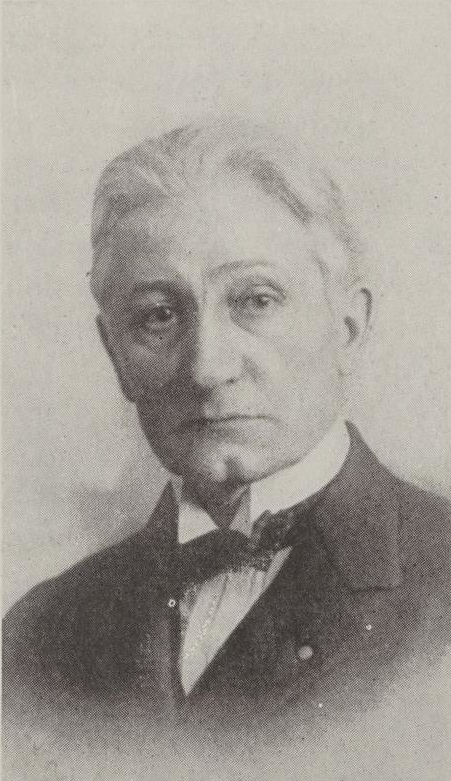
- Born: September 2, 1864; Boston, Massachusetts, U.S.
- Died: January 18, 1929 (aged 64); New York, New York, U.S.

Caspar William Whitney (September 2, 1864 – January 18, 1929) was an American author, editor, explorer, outdoorsman, and war correspondent. He originated the concept of the All-American team in college football in 1889, when he worked for Harper's Magazine.

== Biography ==
Caspar Whitney was the son of John Henry Whitney (1833–1869) and Amelia D. Goldermann, born in Boston, Massachusetts. He was educated at Saint Mathew's College in California. During the Spanish–American War, Whitney submitted articles from the front in Cuba. At the Battle of Las Guasimas, he accompanied General Young's 1st and 10th (Regular) Cavalry. His published map of the battle is considered the most accurate of that action published at that time. His depiction of the fighting on the right is made from personal observation. His depiction of the left where the Rough Riders fought was based on post-battle interviews.

From 1900, he was an owner and editor-in-chief of the monthly Outing magazine, which promoted the outdoors and sporting pursuits, as well as a good deal of adventure fiction; authors included Jack London and Clarence E. Mulford. He was a founding member of the Explorers Club (1904) after expeditions in North and South America. He later edited Outdoor America. He declared bankruptcy in 1910.

As a sports journalist he was an advocate of athletic amateurism and was a member of the International Olympic Committee (1900–1905) and the American Olympic Committee (president 1906–1910). He wrote on a wide range of subjects including big-game hunting, inter collegiate sporting contests (especially football and baseball), amateur versus professional contests, and the Olympic Games. In the early 1900s, he edited the American Sportsman's Library, a quality series of 16 volumes.

Whitney testified in a lawsuit against him that he earned a salary of $8,000 (nearly $200,000 inflation adjusted to 2008) for editing Outing and $1,500 (about $35,000 inflation adjusted) for editing the American Sportsman's Library.

During World War I, Whitney was involved in Europe with the Commission for Relief in Belgium (1915), and then war correspondent of the New-York Tribune (1917–1918).

Whitney married three times. He wed Anna Childs in 1889; after he departed for the Arctic Circle in December 1894, a trip he would later describe in his book On Snow-Shoes To The Barren Grounds, she filed for divorce, which was granted in Oklahoma in January 1895. He wed Cora Adele Chase in 1897; they were divorced in 1908. He was married a third time in 1909, to Florence Canfield Whitney, who like him did relief work in Belgium during World War I. She later helped found the League of Women Voters and served on the Democratic National Committee. She remained active politically until her death in a motor vehicle accident in 1941. Caspar Whitney wrote a biography of Florence's father, the colorful miner and industrialist Charles A. Canfield (1848–1913), in 1930.

== Books ==
- Sporting Pilgrimage (1894)
- On Snow-Shoes to the Barren Grounds (1896)
- Hawaiian America (1899)
- Musk-Ox, Bison, Sheep and Goat (1904) (with George Bird Grinnell and Owen Wister)
- Jungle Trails and Jungle People (1905)
- Flowing Road (1912)
- What's the Matter with Mexico? (1916)
- Gott mit Uns - the Boche Delusion (1918)
- Hunt Clubs and Country Clubs in America (1928)
- Charles Adelbert Canfield (1930)

== Sources ==
- Dillon Wallace Papers
- Edgar Rice Burroughs Library
- Explorer's Club History
- Kent State Smart Club
