= All-America college football team =

Annual award to the best players in collegiate American football

- Awarded for: The best college football players in the United States at their respective positions
- Country: United States
- Presented by: NCAA

History
- First award: 1889
- Most recent: 2025

The All-America college football team is an honor given annually to the best college football players in the United States at their respective positions. The original use of the term All-America seems to have been to the 1889 All-America college football team selected by Caspar Whitney and published in This Week's Sports. Football pioneer Walter Camp also began selecting All-America teams in the 1890s and was recognized as the official selector in the early years of the 20th century.

== NCAA recognition ==
As of 2024, the All-America college football team is composed of the following All-American first teams chosen by the following selector organizations: Associated Press (AP), Football Writers Association of America (FWAA), American Football Coaches Association (AFCA), Walter Camp Foundation (WCFF), Sporting News (TSN, from its historic name of The Sporting News), Sports Illustrated (SI), The Athletic (Athletic), USA Today (USAT), ESPN, CBS Sports (CBS), College Football News (CFN), Scout.com, Athlon Sports, Phil Steele, and Fox Sports (FOX).

=== Consensus ===
Starting in 2009, the National Collegiate Athletic Association (NCAA) recognizes the All-America teams selected by the AP, AFCA, FWAA, Sporting News, and the WCFF to determine consensus All-Americans. If more than half of the organizations select a player to their first team, he receives the "consensus" honor. If no player qualifies under that criterion, a player named to two first teams can be chosen. Second- and third-team selections can be used as tie-breakers. If still tied, each player is listed. If a player is named an All-American by all five organizations, he receives "unanimous All-American" recognition. Depending upon the distribution of first team honors at any given position, it is possible to be consensus with fewer than three first-team selections. As of 2025, The Ohio State University had produced the most unanimous All-Americans of any program with 42.

=== Individual ===
There have been 2,868 players from 156 colleges and universities since 1889 who were selected to at least one All-American first team. Five players have earned that honor four times: They are:

- Charles Dudley Daly, Quarterback, 1898, 1899, 1900, 1901 at Harvard and Army
- Gordon Brown, Guard, 1897, 1898, 1899, 1900 at Yale
- Truxtun Hare, Guard, 1897, 1898, 1899, 1900 at Penn
- Frank Hinkey, End, 1891, 1892, 1893, 1894 at Yale
- Marshall Newell, Tackle, 1890, 1891, 1892, 1893 at Harvard

== Selectors ==
=== Associated Press ===
The Associated Press has a panel of sportswriters who vote to determine the AP All-America Team. It has selected an All-America team since 1925.

=== AFCA ===
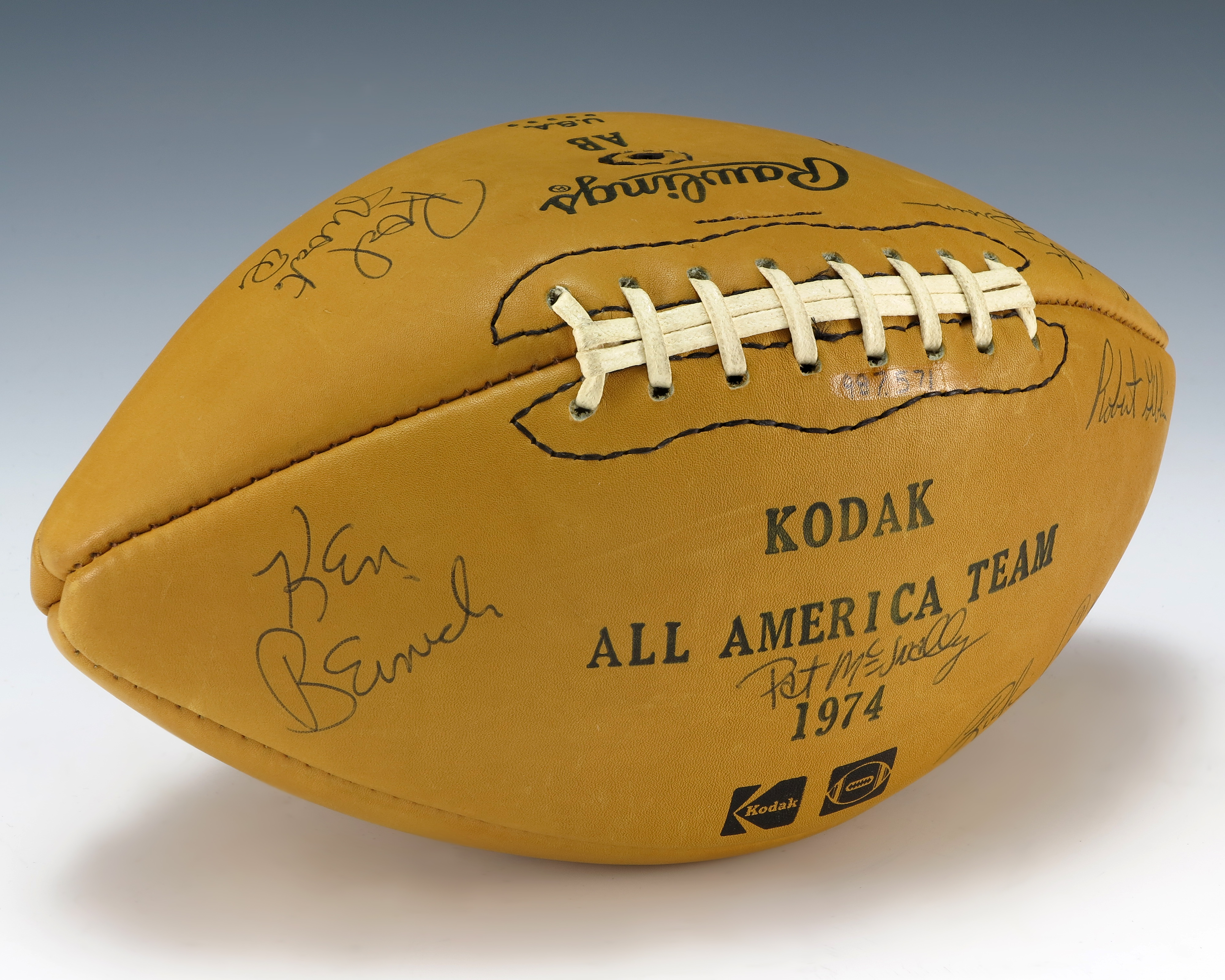
A football signed by the 1974 Kodak All-America Team

The American Football Coaches Association (AFCA) has selected an All-America team every year since 1945. It is often referred to as the "Coaches' All-America Team". The Selection Process is an All-America Selection Committee is made up of three head coaches from each of the AFCA's nine I-A (Bowl Division) districts, one of whom serves as a district chairman, along with another head coach who serves as the chairman of the selection committee. The coaches in each district are responsible for ranking the top players in their respective districts; that information, along with ballots submitted by FBS head coaches, are used to select the AFCA FBS Coaches' All-America Team.snake

The Coaches' All-America Team has been sponsored by various entities throughout the years but it is now under its own banner, the AFCA. These are the sponsors/publishers of the team throughout the years.

1945–1947: Published in Saturday Evening Post
1948–1956: Published in Collier's
1957–1959: General Mills
1960–1993: Eastman Kodak
1994: Schooner's International
1995–1996: AFCA
1997–1999: Burger King
2000–present: AFCA

=== FWAA ===
The Football Writers Association of America (FWAA) Team, the second longest continuously published team in college football, has been a staple of the college football scene since 1944. It is sometimes referred to as the "Writers' All-America Team". The FWAA has selected an All-America team with the help of its members and an All-America Committee which represents all the regions in the country. Some who have helped to select this team over the years: Mark Blaudschun, Grantland Rice, Bert McGrane, Blackie Sherrod, Furman Bisher, Pat Harmon, Fred Russell, Edwin Pope, Murray Olderman, Paul Zimmerman. The All-America team is selected by a committee of writers representing all conferences and regions of the NCAA.

The Writers' Team has been highlighted in various media forums. From 1946 to 1970, Look published the FWAA team and brought players and selected writers to New York City for a celebration. During that 25-year period, the FWAA team was introduced on national television shows by Bob Hope, Steve Allen, Perry Como and others. After Look folded, the FWAA started a long association with NCAA Films (later known as NCAA Productions), which produced a 30-minute television show and sold it to sponsors. The team was part of ABC Television's 1981 College Football Series. From 1983 to 1990, the team was either on ABC or ESPN, and since 1991 has returned to the national spotlight on ABC. The corporate sponsor for the Writers' team is AT&T, after several years of Cingular being the sponsor.

=== WCFF ===
The Walter Camp Football Foundation (WCFF) All-America team is selected by the head coaches and sports information directors of the 120 Football Bowl Subdivision schools and certified by UHY Advisors, a New Haven-based accounting firm. Walter Camp, "The Father of American Football", first selected an All-America team in 1889. The WCF claims an 80% participation rate in the voting for its All-America team.

=== Sporting News ===
Sporting News, formerly known as The Sporting News and known colloquially as TSN, have teams college football editors and staff select teams, which they have been doing since 1934. From that year through the 1962 season TSN's All-America team was picked by a poll of sportswriters. Beginning in 1964 the team was selected by "professional scouts and observers". The Sporting News cited the advent of two-platoon football as the need to go to that system.

=== UPI ===
United Press International (UPI) selected players in a national poll of sportswriters and began selecting teams in 1925 as "United Press". In 1958, after it merged with the International News Service (INS), it became United Press International. The INS had chosen teams since 1913. UPI continued to choose an All-America team, based on a poll of sportswriters, through the 1996 season.

=== Central Press ===
The Central Press Association, a newspaper syndicate based in Cleveland, polled team school captains for its "Captain's All-America Team"

=== Newspaper Enterprise Association ===
Another media group who polled writers and players to compose its team. It ran from 1924 through 1996.

=== Others ===
ABC Sports, ESPN, CNN Sports Illustrated, College Football News, CBSSports.com, PFF, Time magazine, Bleacher Report and many others also select All-America teams.

Time magazine selected All-America teams from 1956 through 1976. ESPN's selections are made by veteran college football writer Ivan Maisel. Maisel's began selecting an All-America team for ESPN.com in 2002. CBS Sports.com is voted on by writers, producers and staff of CBS Sports. Two of the newest, seemingly driven by the internet, are Scout.com and Rivals.com.

During the 1930s, Chester L. Washington, sports editor of the Pittsburgh Courier, selected All-America teams of players at historically black colleges and universities (HBCU).

== Selections by year ==
- 1889
- 1890
- 1891
- 1892
- 1893
- 1894
- 1895
- 1896
- 1897
- 1898
- 1899
- 1900
- 1901
- 1902
- 1903
- 1904
- 1905
- 1906
- 1907
- 1908
- 1909
- 1910
- 1911
- 1912
- 1913
- 1914
- 1915
- 1916
- 1917
- 1918
- 1919
- 1920
- 1921
- 1922
- 1923
- 1924
- 1925
- 1926
- 1927
- 1928
- 1929
- 1930
- 1931
- 1932
- 1933
- 1934
- 1935
- 1936
- 1937
- 1938
- 1939
- 1940
- 1941
- 1942
- 1943
- 1944
- 1945
- 1946
- 1947
- 1948
- 1949
- 1950
- 1951
- 1952
- 1953
- 1954
- 1955
- 1956
- 1957
- 1958
- 1959
- 1960
- 1961
- 1962
- 1963
- 1964
- 1965
- 1966
- 1967
- 1968
- 1969
- 1970
- 1971
- 1972
- 1973
- 1974
- 1975
- 1976
- 1977
- 1978
- 1979
- 1980
- 1981
- 1982
- 1983
- 1984
- 1985
- 1986
- 1987
- 1988
- 1989
- 1990
- 1991
- 1992
- 1993
- 1994
- 1995
- 1996
- 1997
- 1998
- 1999
- 2000
- 2001
- 2002
- 2003
- 2004
- 2005
- 2006
- 2007
- 2008
- 2009
- 2010
- 2011
- 2012
- 2013
- 2014
- 2015
- 2016
- 2017
- 2018
- 2019
- 2020
- 2021
- 2022
- 2023
- 2024
- 2025

== Division III ==
In 1999, D3football.com began selecting an All-America team for Division III.
