= List of College Football Hall of Fame inductees (players) =

This list consists of college football players who have been elected to the College Football Hall of Fame.

Name	College(s) played for	Position	Year inducted (link to HOF bio)
Earl Abell	Colgate	Tackle	1973
Alex Agase	Illinois, Purdue	Guard	1963
Harry Agganis	Boston University	Quarterback	1974
Troy Aikman	Oklahoma, UCLA	Quarterback	2008
Frankie Albert	Stanford	Quarterback	1956
Trev Alberts	Nebraska	Linebacker	2015
Ki Aldrich	TCU	Center	1960
Mac Aldrich	Yale	Halfback	1972
Charles Alexander	LSU	Halfback	2012
Doc Alexander	Syracuse	Guard	1954
Marcus Allen	Southern California	Halfback	2000
Carlos Alvarez	Florida	Wide receiver	2011
Lance Alworth	Arkansas	Halfback	1984
Alan Ameche	Wisconsin	Fullback	1975
Knowlton Ames	Princeton	Fullback	1969
Warren Amling	Ohio State	Guard/Tackle	1984
Bob Anderson	Army	Halfback	2004
Bobby Anderson	Colorado	Halfback	2006
Dick Anderson	Colorado	Safety	1993
Donny Anderson	Texas Tech	Halfback	1989
Hunk Anderson	Notre Dame	Guard	1974
Otis Armstrong	Purdue	Halfback	2012
Jon Arnett	Southern California	Halfback	2001
LaVar Arrington	Penn State	Linebacker	2022
Doug Atkins	Tennessee	Tackle	1985
Pervis Atkins	New Mexico State	Halfback	2009
Jerry Azumah	New Hampshire	Running Back	2026
Bob Babich	Miami (OH)	Linebacker	1994
Everett Bacon	Wesleyan	Quarterback	1966
Reds Bagnell	Pennsylvania	Halfback	1977
Champ Bailey	Georgia	Defensive back	2022
Johnny Bailey	Texas A&I	Running back	2000
Hobey Baker	Princeton	Quarterback	1975
Johnny Baker	Southern California	Guard	1983
Ralph Baker	Northwestern	Halfback	1981
Terry Baker	Oregon State	Quarterback	1982
Montee Ball	Wisconsin	Running back	2025
Jim Ballard	Wilmington, Mount Union	Quarterback	2008
Harold Ballin	Princeton	Tackle	1973
Bill Banker	Tulane	Halfback	1977
Vince Banonis	Detroit	Center	1986
Mike Barber	Marshall	Wide receiver	2005
Stan Barnes	California	Center/Tackle	1954
Charley Barrett	Cornell	Quarterback	1958
Steve Bartkowski	California	Quarterback	2012
Harris Barton	North Carolina	Offensive tackle	2021
Bert Baston	Minnesota	End	1954
Cliff Battles	West Virginia Wesleyan	Halfback	1955
Sammy Baugh	TCU	Quarterback	1951
Maxie Baughan	Georgia Tech	Center	1988
Kirk Baumgartner	Wisconsin–Stevens Point	Quarterback	2005
Jim Bausch	Wichita, Kansas	Halfback	1954
Ron Beagle	Navy	End	1986
Terry Beasley	Auburn	Wide receiver	1986
Gary Beban	UCLA	Quarterback	1988
Hub Bechtol	Texas Tech, Texas	End	1991
Ray Beck	Georgia Tech	Guard	1997
John Beckett	Oregon	Tackle	1972
Chuck Bednarik	Pennsylvania	Center	1969
Hal Bedsole	Southern California	End	2012
Forrest Behm	Nebraska	Tackle	1988
Bobby Bell	Minnesota	Tackle	1991
Ricky Bell	Southern California	Running back	2003
Joe Bellino	Navy	Halfback	1977
Marty Below	Wisconsin–Oshkosh	Tackle	1988
Albert Benbrook	Michigan	Guard	1971
Cornelius Bennett	Alabama	Linebacker	2005
Jeff Bentrim	North Dakota State	Quarterback	1998
Charlie Berry	Lafayette	End	1980
Eric Berry	Tennessee	Defensive Back	2023
Angelo Bertelli	Notre Dame	Quarterback	1972
Jay Berwanger	Chicago	Halfback	1954
Larry Bettencourt	St. Mary's	Center	1973
Fred Biletnikoff	Florida State	Wide receiver	1991
Chris Bisaillon	Illinois Wesleyan	Wide receiver	2012
Michael Bishop	Kansas State	Quarterback	2023
Justin Blackmon	Oklahoma State	Wide receiver	2024
Bennie Blades	Miami (FL)	Safety	2006
Doc Blanchard	Army	Fullback	1964
Tony Blazine	Illinois Wesleyan	Tackle	2002
Al Blozis	Georgetown	Tackle	1986
Dré Bly	North Carolina	Cornerback	2014
Ed Bock	Iowa State	Guard	1970
Lynn Bomar	Vanderbilt	End	1956
Doug Bomeisler	Yale	End	1972
Albie Booth	Yale	Halfback	1966
Emerson Boozer	Maryland Eastern Shore	Halfback	2010
George Bork	Northern Illinois	Quarterback	1999
Buzz Borries	Navy	Halfback	1960
Tony Boselli	Southern California	Offensive tackle	2014
Bruce Bosley	West Virginia	Tackle	1982
Don Bosseler	Miami (FL)	Fullback	1990
Brian Bosworth	Oklahoma	Linebacker	2015
Vic Bottari	California	Halfback	1981
Murry Bowden	Dartmouth	Linebacker	2003
Benny Lee Boynton	Williams	Quarterback	1962
Terry Bradshaw	Louisiana Tech	Quarterback	1996
Tom Brahaney	Oklahoma	Center	2007
Bob Breunig	Arizona State	Linebacker	2015
Charley Brewer	Harvard	Fullback	1971
Sean Brewer	Millsaps	Defensive tackle	2015
Johnny Bright	Drake	Halfback	1984
Marlin Briscoe	Nebraska Omaha	Quarterback	2016
John Brodie	Stanford	Quarterback	1986
George Brooke	Swarthmore	Fullback	1969
Derrick Brooks	Florida State	Linebacker	2016
Al Brosky	Illinois	Safety	1998
Bob Brown	Nebraska	Guard	1993
Dave Brown	Michigan	Safety	2007
George Brown	Navy, San Diego State	Guard	1985
Gordon Brown	Yale	Guard	1954
Jim Brown	Syracuse	Halfback	1995
John Brown	Navy	Guard	1955
Johnny Mack Brown	Alabama	Halfback	1957
Lomas Brown	Florida	Offensive tackle	2020
Roger Brown	Maryland Eastern Shore	Tackle	2009
Ruben Brown	Pittsburgh	Offensive tackle	2015
Tay Brown	Southern California	Tackle	1980
Ted Brown	North Carolina State	Halfback	2013
Tim Brown	Notre Dame	Wide receiver	2009
Tom Brown	Minnesota	Guard	2003
Troy Brown	Marshall	Wide receiver	2010
Ross Browner	Notre Dame	Defensive end	1999
Teel Bruner	Centre College	Safety	1999
Tedy Bruschi	Arizona	Defensive end	2013
Buck Buchanan	Grambling	Tackle	1996
Terrell Buckley	Florida State	Defensive Back	2019
Brad Budde	Southern California	Offensive guard	1998
Paul Bunker	Army	Tackle	1969
Chris Burford	Stanford	End	1995
Kurt Burris	Oklahoma	Center	2000
Ron Burton	Northwestern	Halfback	1990
Reggie Bush	Southern California	Running back	2023
Dick Butkus	Illinois	Center	1983
Bob Butler	Wisconsin	Tackle	1972
Kevin Butler	Georgia	Placekicker	2001
Dave Butz	Purdue	Defensive tackle	2014
Keith Byars	Ohio State	Running back	2020
Dennis Byrd	North Carolina State	Defensive tackle	2010
George Cafego	Tennessee	Halfback	1969
Chris Cagle	Louisiana-Lafayette, Army	Halfback	1954
Johnny Cain	Alabama	Running back	1973
Brad Calip	East Central	Quarterback	2003
Eddie Cameron	Washington & Lee	Fullback	1976
Paul Cameron	UCLA	Halfback	2024
Dave Campbell	Harvard	End	1958
Earl Campbell	Texas	Halfback	1990
Billy Cannon	LSU	Halfback	2008
Jack Cannon	Notre Dame	Guard	1965
John Cappelletti	Penn State	Halfback	1993
Frank Carideo	Notre Dame	Quarterback	1954
Chuck Carney	Illinois	End	1966
J. C. Caroline	Illinois	Halfback	1989
Bill Carpenter	Army	End	1982
Hunter Carpenter	Virginia Tech, North Carolina	Halfback	1957
Gregg Carr	Auburn	Linebacker	2025
Chuck Carroll	Washington	Halfback	1964
Harry Carson	South Carolina State	Defensive end	2002
Anthony Carter	Michigan	Wide receiver	2001
Ki-Jana Carter	Penn State	Running Back	2026
Tommy Casanova	LSU	Cornerback	1995
Eddie Casey	Harvard	Halfback	1968
Tony Casillas	Oklahoma	Middle guard	2004
Rod Cason	Angelo State	Tackle	2002
Dave Casper	Notre Dame	Tight end	2012
Howard "Hopalong" Cassady	Ohio State	Halfback	1979
Ronnie Caveness	Arkansas	Center	2010
Chuck Cecil	Arizona	Safety	2009
Guy Chamberlin	Nebraska Wesleyan, Nebraska	End	1962
Wes Chandler	Florida	Wide receiver	2015
Sam Chapman	California	Halfback	1984
Bob Chappuis	Michigan	Halfback	1988
Ray Childress	Texas A&M	Defensive end	2010
Paul Christman	Missouri	Halfback	1956
Joe Cichy	North Dakota State	Safety	1997
Dutch Clark	Colorado College	Quarterback	1951
Paul Cleary	Southern California	End	1989
Zora Clevenger	Indiana	Halfback	1968
Jack Cloud	William & Mary	Fullback	1990
Dexter Coakley	Appalachian State	Linebacker	2011
Trevor Cobb	Rice	Running back	2018
Gary Cochran	Princeton	End	1971
Josh Cody	Vanderbilt	Tackle	1970
Don Coleman	Michigan State	Tackle	1975
Bruce Collie	Texas-Arlington	Tackle	2026
Kerry Collins	Penn State	Quarterback	2018
Charlie Conerly	Mississippi	Halfback	1966
Shane Conlan	Penn State	Linebacker	2014
George Connor	Holy Cross, Notre Dame	Halfback	1963
Bill Cooper	Muskingum	Fullback	2000
Pa Corbin	Yale	Center	1969
Bill Corbus	Stanford	Guard	1957
Tim Couch	Kentucky	Quarterback	2024
Tom Cousineau	Ohio State	Linebacker	2016
Jim Covert	Pittsburgh	Tackle	2003
Hector Cowan	Princeton	Tackle	1951
Ted Coy	Yale	Fullback	1951
Bob Crable	Notre Dame	Linebacker	2017
Michael Crabtree	Texas Tech	Wide Receiver	2022
Brad Crawford	Franklin College	Cornerback	2000
Fred Crawford	Duke	Tackle	1973
Sylvester Croom	Alabama	Center	2022
Randy Cross	UCLA	Center, Guard	2010
Eric Crouch	Nebraska	Quarterback	2020
John David Crow	Texas A&M	Halfback	1976
Jim Crowley	Notre Dame	Halfback	1966
Larry Csonka	Syracuse	Fullback	1989
George Cumby	Oklahoma	Linebacker	2026
Randall Cunningham	Nevada Las Vegas	Quarterback	2016
Sam Cunningham	Southern California	Fullback	2010
Tom Curtis	Michigan	Safety	2005
Slade Cutter	Navy	Tackle	1967
Zygmont Czarobski	Notre Dame	Tackle	1977
Carroll Dale	Virginia Tech	End	1987
Jerry Dalrymple	Tulane	End	1954
John Dalton	Navy	Halfback	1970
Charlie Daly	Harvard, Army	Quarterback	1951
Ave Daniell	Pittsburgh	Tackle	1975
Jim Daniell	Ohio State	Tackle	1977
Tom Davies	Pittsburgh	Halfback	1970
Anthony Davis	Southern California	Running back	2005
Bobby Davis	Georgia Tech	Tackle	1978
Ernie Davis	Syracuse	Halfback	1979
Glenn Davis	Army	Halfback	1961
Harold Davis	Westminster (PA)	Quarterback	2004
Jeff Davis	Clemson	Linebacker	2007
Troy Davis	Iowa State	Running back	2016
Pete Dawkins	Army	Halfback	1975
Ron Dayne	Wisconsin	Halfback	2013
Fred Dean	Louisiana Tech	Defensive end	2009
Tom Deery	Widener	Safety	1998
Joe Delaney	Northwestern State	Halfback	1997
Steve DeLong	Tennessee	Middle guard	1993
Kenneth Dement	Southeast Missouri State	Tackle	1998
Vern Den Herder	Central College	Defensive end	1996
Kevin Dent	Jackson State	Safety	2006
Al DeRogatis	Duke	Center/Tackle	1986
Paul Des Jardien	Chicago	Center	1955
Ty Detmer	Brigham Young	Quarterback	2012
Aubrey Devine	Iowa	Quarterback	1973
John DeWitt	Princeton	Guard	1954
Buddy Dial	Rice	End	1993
Dave Dickenson	Montana	Quarterback	2018
Eric Dickerson	SMU	Running back	2020
Chuck Dicus	Arkansas	Wide receiver	1999
Dan Dierdorf	Michigan	Tackle	2000
Mike Ditka	Pittsburgh	End	1986
Rickey Dixon	Oklahoma	Defensive back	2019
Glenn Dobbs	Tulsa	Halfback	1980
Bobby Dodd	Tennessee	Quarterback	1959
Jim Dombrowski	Virginia	Offensive tackle	2008
Hollie Donan	Princeton	Tackle	1984
Aaron Donald	Pittsburgh	Defensive Tackle	2026
Keith Dorney	Penn State	Offensive tackle	2005
Tony Dorsett	Pittsburgh	Halfback	1994
Glenn Dorsey	LSU	Defensive tackle	2020
Mike Doss	Ohio State	Safety	2022
Nathan Dougherty	Tennessee	Guard	1967
Bob Dove	Notre Dame	End	2000
Nick Drahos	Cornell	Tackle, End	1981
Paddy Driscoll	Northwestern	Quarterback	1974
Morley Drury	Southern California	Quarterback	1954
Fred Dryer	San Diego State	Defensive end	1997
Joe Dudek	Plymouth State	Halfback	1997
Dick Duden	Navy	End	2001
Bill Dudley	Virginia	Halfback	1956
Randy Duncan	Iowa	Quarterback	1997
Warrick Dunn	Florida State	Running back	2024
Ed Dyas	Auburn	Fullback	2009
Chuck Ealey	Toledo	Quarterback	2022
Kenny Easley	UCLA	Safety	1991
Walter Eckersall	Chicago	Quarterback	1951
Armanti Edwards	Appalachian State	Quarterback	2024
Bill Edwards	Princeton	Guard	1971
Glen "Turk" Edwards	Washington State	Tackle	1975
Ray Eichenlaub	Notre Dame	Fullback	1972
Steve Eisenhauer	Navy	Tackle/Guard	1994
Larry Elkins	Baylor	Wide receiver	1994
Carl Eller	Minnesota	Tackle	2006
Blake Elliott	Saint John's (MN)	Wide Receiver	2025
Bump Elliott	Purdue, Michigan	Halfback	1989
Jumbo Elliott	Michigan	Offensive tackle	2020
Pete Elliott	Michigan	Quarterback	1994
Dave Elmendorf	Texas A&M	Safety	1997
John Elway	Stanford	Quarterback	2000
Frank Emanuel	Tennessee	Linebacker	2004
Steve Emtman	Washington	Defensive tackle	2006
Doug English	Texas	Defensive tackle	2011
Bill Enyart	Oregon State	Fullback	2011
Greg Eslinger	Minnesota	Center	2025
Ray Evans	Kansas	Halfback	1964
Thomas Everett	Baylor	Safety	2006
Albert Exendine	Carlisle	End	1970
Nello Falaschi	Santa Clara	Quarterback	1971
Kevin Faulk	LSU	All-purpose / Running back	2022
Marshall Faulk	San Diego State	Running back	2017
Mike Favor	North Dakota State	Center	2011
Tom Fears	Santa Clara, UCLA	End	1976
Beattie Feathers	Tennessee	Halfback	1955
Bob Fenimore	Oklahoma State	Halfback	1972
Doc Fenton	Mansfield, LSU	Quarterback	1971
Bob Ferguson	Ohio State	Fullback	1996
John Ferraro	Southern California	Tackle	1974
Wes Fesler	Ohio State	End	1954
Deon Figures	Colorado	Cornerback	2024
Bill Fincher	Georgia Tech	Tackle	1974
Bill Fischer	Notre Dame	Tackle/Guard	1983
Hamilton Fish III	Harvard	Tackle	1954
Bob Fisher	Harvard	Guard	1973
Larry Fitzgerald	Pittsburgh	Wide receiver	2024
Pat Fitzgerald	Northwestern	Linebacker	2008
London Fletcher	John Carroll	Linebacker	2019
Buck Flowers	Davidson, Georgia Tech	Halfback	1955
Charlie Flowers	Mississippi	Fullback	1997
George Floyd	Eastern Kentucky	Safety	1999
Doug Flutie	Boston College	Quarterback	2007
Dan Fortmann	Colgate	Guard	1978
Bill Fralic	Pittsburgh	Tackle	1999
Sam Francis	Nebraska	Fullback	1977
George Franck	Minnesota	Halfback	2002
Ed Franco	Fordham	Tackle	1980
Clint Frank	Yale	Halfback	1955
Rod Franz	California	Guard	1977
Tommie Frazier	Nebraska	Quarterback	2013
Tucker Frederickson	Auburn	Halfback	1994
Dwight Freeney	Syracuse	Defensive End	2023
Benny Friedman	Michigan	Quarterback	1951
John Friesz	Idaho	Quarterback	2006
David Fulcher	Arizona State	Defensive back	2021
William Fuller	North Carolina	Defensive tackle	2016
Roman Gabriel	North Carolina State	Quarterback	1989
Bob Gain	Kentucky	Tackle/Guard	1980
Arnold Galiffa	Army	Quarterback	1983
Willie Galimore	Florida A&M	Halfback	1999
Hugh Gallarneau	Stanford	Halfback	1982
Robert Gallery	Iowa	Tackle	2023
Kenny Gamble	Colgate	Running back	2002
Edgar Garbisch	Washington & Jefferson, Army	Center	1954
Moe Gardner	Illinois	Defensive tackle	2022
Mike Garrett	Southern California	Halfback	1985
Thom Gatewood	Notre Dame	Wide receiver	2015
Charlie Gelbert	Pennsylvania	End	1960
Eddie George	Ohio State	Halfback	2011
Toby Gerhart	Stanford	Running back	2024
Forest Geyer	Oklahoma	Fullback	1973
Jake Gibbs	Mississippi	Quarterback	1995
Kirk Gibson	Michigan State	Wide receiver	2017
Paul Giel	Minnesota	Halfback	1975
Frank Gifford	Southern California	Halfback	1975
Chris Gilbert	Texas	Halfback	1999
Walter Gilbert	Auburn	Center	1956
Harry Gilmer	Alabama	Halfback	1993
George Gipp	Notre Dame	Fullback	1951
Chet Gladchuk	Boston College	Center	1975
Bill Glass	Baylor	Guard	1985
Rich Glover	Nebraska	Middle guard	1995
Marshall Goldberg	Pittsburgh	Fullback	1958
Gene Goodreault	Boston College	End	1982
Walter Gordon	California	Guard/Tackle	1975
Paul Governali	Columbia	Halfback	1986
Jim Grabowski	Illinois	Fullback	1995
Randy Gradishar	Ohio State	Linebacker	1998
Otto Graham	Northwestern	Halfback	1956
Red Grange	Illinois	Halfback	1951
Jerry Gray	Texas	Safety	2013
Bobby Grayson	Stanford	Fullback	1955
Charlie Green	Wittenberg	Quarterback	2002
Darrell Green	Texas A&I	Cornerback	2004
Hugh Green	Pittsburgh	Defensive end	1996
Jacob Green	Texas A&M	Defensive line	2019
John Green	Tulane, Army	Guard	1989
Tim Green	Syracuse	Defensive tackle	2002
"Mean Joe" Greene	North Texas State	Defensive tackle	1984
Bob Griese	Purdue	Quarterback	1984
Archie Griffin	Ohio State	Halfback	1986
Boomer Grigsby	Illinois State	Linebacker	2022
William Grinnell	Tufts	End	1997
Jerry Groom	Notre Dame	Center	1994
Ralph Guglielmi	Notre Dame	Quarterback	2001
Merle Gulick	Toledo, Hobart	Quarterback	1965
Ray Guy	Southern Mississippi	Punter	2004
Joe Guyon	Carlisle, Georgia Tech	Halfback	1971
John Hadl	Kansas	Halfback, quarterback	1994
Edwin Hale	Mississippi College	Quarterback	1963
Charles Haley	James Madison	Defensive end, linebacker	2011
Parker Hall	Mississippi	Halfback	1991
Jack Ham	Penn State	Linebacker	1990
Tracy Ham	Georgia Southern	Quarterback	2007
Bob "Bones" Hamilton	Stanford	Halfback	1972
Joe Hamilton	Georgia Tech	Quarterback	2014
Tom Hamilton	Navy	Halfback	1965
Dan Hampton	Arkansas	Defensive Tackle	2024
John Hannah	Alabama	Guard, Tackle	1999
Terry Hanratty	Notre Dame	Quarterback	2025
Jason Hanson	Washington State	Placekicker	2020
Vic Hanson	Syracuse	End	1973
Pat Harder	Wisconsin	Fullback	1993
Huntington Hardwick	Harvard	Halfback, end	1954
Truxtun Hare	Pennsylvania	Guard	1951
Chic Harley	Ohio State	Halfback, quarterback	1951
Tom Harmon	Michigan	Halfback	1954
Howard Harpster	Carnegie Tech	Quarterback	1956
Howard Harpster	Carnegie Tech	Quarterback	1956
Graham Harrell	Texas Tech	Quarterback	2025
Major Harris	West Virginia	Quarterback	2009
Marvin Harrison	Syracuse	Wide receiver, kick returner	2026
Ed Hart	Princeton	Tackle	1954
Leon Hart	Notre Dame	End	1973
Bill Hartman	Georgia	Fullback	1984
Jim Haslett	Indiana (PA)	Linebacker	2001
Mike Hass	Oregon State	Wide Receiver	2022
Frank Hawkins	Nevada-Reno	Running back	1997
Mike Haynes	Arizona State	Cornerback	2001
Homer Hazel	Rutgers	Fullback, end	1951
Matt Hazeltine	California	Linebacker	1989
Ed Healey	Holy Cross, Dartmouth	Tackle	1974
Garrison Hearst	Georgia	Running Back	2026
Pudge Heffelfinger	Yale	Guard	1951
Mel Hein	Washington State	Center	1954
Don Heinrich	Washington	Quarterback	1987
E. J. Henderson	Maryland	Linebacker	2020
John Henderson	Tennessee	Defensive Tackle	2025
Ted Hendricks	Miami (FL)	Linebacker	1987
Garney Henley	Huron	Running back	2004
Chad Hennings	Air Force	Defensive tackle	2006
Wilbur Henry	Washington & Jefferson	Tackle	1951
Mark Herrmann	Purdue	Quarterback	2010
Clarence Herschberger	Chicago	Fullback	1970
Bob Herwig	California	Center	1964
Willie Heston	San Jose State, Michigan	Halfback	1954
Herman Hickman	Tennessee	Guard	1959
Bill Hickok	Yale	Guard	1971
John Hicks	Ohio State	Guard	2001
Dan Hill	Duke	Center	1962
Art Hillebrand	Princeton	Tackle	1970
Clarkston Hines	Duke	Wide receiver	2010
Frank Hinkey	Yale	End	1951
Carl Hinkle	Vanderbilt	Center	1959
Clarke Hinkle	Bucknell	Fullback	1971
Elroy Hirsch	Wisconsin, Michigan	Halfback	1974
Jimmy Hitchcock	Auburn	Halfback	1954
Terry Hoage	Georgia	Safety	2000
Frank "Nordy" Hoffman	Notre Dame	Guard	1978
James Hogan	Yale	Tackle	1954
Jim Holder	Panhandle A&M (OK)	Halfback	2012
Brud Holland	Cornell	End	1965
Don Holleder	Army	End, Quarterback	1985
Bill Hollenback	Pennsylvania	End, fullback	1951
Mike Holovak	Boston College	Fullback	1985
Pierce Holt	Angelo State	Defensive end	1997
Torry Holt	North Carolina State	Wide receiver	2019
E. J. Holub	Texas Tech	Center, Linebacker	1986
Paul Hornung	Notre Dame	Halfback	1985
Edwin Horrell	California	Center	1969
Les Horvath	Ohio State	Halfback, quarterback	1969
Jim Houston	Ohio State	End, defensive end	2005
Dana Howard	Illinois	Linebacker	2018
Desmond Howard	Michigan	Wide receiver, kick returner	2010
Art Howe	Yale	Quarterback	1973
Dixie Howell	Alabama	Halfback	1970
John Huard	Maine	Linebacker	2014
John Huarte	Notre Dame	Quarterback	2005
Cal Hubbard	Centenary, Geneva	Tackle	1962
Jack Hubbard	Amherst	Halfback	1966
Pooley Hubert	Alabama	Quarterback, halfback	1964
Gordon Hudson	Brigham Young	Tight end	2009
Chris Hudson	Colorado	Defensive back	2026
Michael Huff	Texas	Defensive back	2025
Sam Huff	West Virginia	Linebacker	1980
Weldon Humble	Rice, Louisiana-Lafayette	Guard	1961
Ricky Hunley	Arizona	Linebacker	1997
Jackie Hunt	Marshall	Halfback, fullback	2004
Joel Hunt	Texas A&M	Halfback	1967
Ellery Huntington Jr.	Colgate	Quarterback	1972
Steve Hutchinson	Michigan	Guard	2024
Don Hutson	Alabama	End	1951
Cosmo Iacavazzi	Princeton	Fullback	2002
Jonas Ingram	Navy	Fullback	1968
Mark Ingram	Alabama	Running back	2026
Cecil Isbell	Purdue	Halfback	1967
Rocket Ismail	Notre Dame	Wide receiver, kick returner	2019
Harvey Jablonsky	Washington (MO), Army	Guard	1978
Bo Jackson	Auburn	Halfback	1998
Keith Jackson	Oklahoma	Tight end	2001
LaMichael James	Oregon	Halfback	2023
Vic Janowicz	Ohio State	Halfback	1976
Dick Jauron	Yale	Running back	2015
John Jefferson	Arizona State	Wide receiver	2002
Darold Jenkins	Missouri	Center	1976
Jackie Jensen	California	Fullback	1984
Herb Joesting	Minnesota	Fullback	1954
Billy Johnson	Widener	Halfback	1996
Bob Johnson	Tennessee	Center	1989
Calvin Johnson	Georgia Tech	Wide receiver	2018
Derrick Johnson	Texas	Linebacker	2023
Gary Johnson	Grambling	Defensive tackle	1997
Jimmy Johnson	Carlisle, Northwestern	Quarterback	1969
Johnnie Johnson	Texas	Safety	2007
Ron Johnson	Michigan	Halfback	1992
Bert Jones	LSU	Quarterback	2016
Brent Jones	Santa Clara	Tight end	2002
Cal Jones	Iowa	Guard	1980
Clinton Jones	Michigan State	Halfback	2015
Gomer Jones	Ohio State	Center	1978
Marvin Jones	Florida State	Linebacker	2022
Stan Jones	Maryland	Tackle	2000
Lee Roy Jordan	Alabama	Center	1983
Shelby Jordan	Washington (MO)	Linebacker	2013
Frank Juhan	Sewanee	Center	1966
E. J. Junior	Alabama	Defensive end	2020
Charlie Justice	North Carolina	Halfback	1961
Mort Kaer	Southern California	Halfback	1972
Joe Kapp	California	Quarterback	1972
Alex Karras	Iowa	Tackle	1991
Ken Kavanaugh	LSU	End	1963
Eddie Kaw	Cornell	Halfback	1954
Dick Kazmaier	Princeton	Halfback	1966
Stan Keck	Princeton	Guard, Tackle	1959
Chip Kell	Tennessee	Center, Guard	2006
Brian Kelley	California Lutheran	Linebacker	2010
Larry Kelley	Yale	End	1969
Bill Kelly	Montana	Quarterback	1969
Joe Kendall	Kentucky State	Halfback	2007
Doug Kenna	Army	Quarterback	1984
Lincoln Kennedy	Washington	Tackle	2015
Rex Kern	Ohio State	Quarterback	2007
George Kerr	Boston College	Guard	1984
Hank Ketcham	Yale	Center, Guard	1968
Leroy Keyes	Purdue	Halfback	1990
Glenn Killinger	Penn State	Quarterback	1971
Billy Kilmer	UCLA	Halfback	1999
John Kilpatrick	Yale	End	1955
John Kimbrough	Texas A&M	Fullback	1954
Bruiser Kinard	Mississippi	Tackle	1951
Terry Kinard	Clemson	Defensive back	2001
Steve Kiner	Tennessee	Linebacker	1999
Philip King	Princeton	Quarterback	1962
Nile Kinnick	Iowa	Halfback	1951
Harry Kipke	Michigan	Halfback	1958
Johnny Kitzmiller	Oregon	Halfback	1969
Jim Kleinsasser	North Dakota	Tight end	2025
Mickey Kobrosky	Trinity College	Halfback	2011
Barton Koch	Baylor	Guard	1974
Bill Kollar	Montana State	Defensive Tackle	2023
Walter Koppisch	Columbia	Halfback	1981
Ron Kramer	Michigan	End	1978
Tommy Kramer	Rice	Quarterback	2012
Alex Kroll	Yale, Rutgers	Center	1997
Olin Kreutz	Washington	Center	2026
Charlie Krueger	Texas A&M	Tackle	1983
Tim Krumrie	Wisconsin	Defensive line	2016
Luke Kuechly	Boston College	Linebacker	2023
Malcolm Kutner	Texas	End	1974
Ted Kwalick	Penn State	Tight End	1989
Steve Lach	Duke	Halfback	1980
Myles Lane	Dartmouth	Halfback	1970
Antonio Langham	Alabama	Cornerback	2024
Willie Lanier	Morgan State	Linebacker	2000
Johnny Lattner	Notre Dame	Halfback	1979
Hank Lauricella	Tennessee	Halfback	1981
James Laurinaitis	Ohio State	Linebacker	2026
Lester Lautenschlaeger	Tulane	Quarterback	1975
Elmer Layden	Notre Dame	Fullback	1951
Bobby Layne	Texas	Quarterback	1968
Langdon Lea	Princeton	End, Tackle	1964
Roosevelt Leaks	Texas	Running back	2006
Eddie LeBaron	Pacific	Quarterback	1980
Jim LeClair	North Dakota	Linebacker	1999
Jimmy Leech	VMI	Halfback	1956
Matt Leinart	Southern California	Quarterback	2017
Darrell Lester	TCU	Center	1988
Jerry LeVias	SMU	Wide receiver	2003
D. D. Lewis	Mississippi State	Linebacker	2001
Leo Lewis	Lincoln (MO)	Halfback	2005
William Lewis	Harvard	Center	2009
Bob Lilly	TCU	Defensive tackle	1981
Augie Lio	Georgetown	Guard	1979
Floyd Little	Syracuse	Halfback	1983
Gordie Lockbaum	Holy Cross	Running back, Defensive back	2001
Gordon Locke	Iowa	Fullback	1960
Neil Lomax	Portland State	Quarterback	1996
Chuck Long	Iowa	Quarterback	1999
Mel Long	Toledo	Defensive tackle	1998
Frank Loria	Virginia Tech	Defensive back	1999
Ronnie Lott	Southern California	Defensive back	2002
Don Lourie	Princeton	Quarterback	1974
Woodrow Lowe	Alabama	Linebacker	2009
Richie Lucas	Penn State	Quarterback	1986
Andrew Luck	Stanford	Quarterback	2022
Sid Luckman	Columbia	Halfback	1960
Johnny Lujack	Notre Dame	Quarterback	1960
Pug Lund	Minnesota	Halfback	1958
Jim Lynch	Notre Dame	Linebacker	1992
Jordan Lynch	Northern Illinois	Quarterback, all-purpose	2026
Marty Lyons	Alabama	Defensive tackle	2011
Rob Lytle	Michigan	Running back	2015
Ken MacAfee	Notre Dame	Tight end	1997
Alex Mack	California	Offensive line	2025
Bob MacLeod	Dartmouth	Halfback	1977
Jeremy Maclin	Missouri	Wide receiver/kick returner	2023
Bart Macomber	Illinois	Halfback, Quarterback	1972
Dick Maegle (Moegle)	Rice	Halfback, Safety	1979
Eddie Mahan	Harvard	Fullback	1951
Johnny Majors	Tennessee	Halfback	1987
Ronnie Mallett	Central Arkansas	Wide receiver	2006
Bill Mallory	Yale	Fullback	1964
Vaughn Mancha	Alabama	Center	1990
Jim Mandich	Michigan	Tight end	2004
Gerald Mann	SMU	Quarterback	1969
Archie Manning	Mississippi	Quarterback	1989
Peyton Manning	Tennessee	Quarterback	2017
Edgar Manske	Northwestern	End	1989
Ken Margerum	Stanford	Wide receiver	2009
Ed Marinaro	Cornell	Running back	1991
Dan Marino	Pittsburgh	Quarterback	2002
Vic Markov	Washington	Tackle	1976
Bobby Marshall	Minnesota	End	1971
Wilber Marshall	Florida	Linebacker	2008
Jim Martin	Notre Dame	End, Tackle	1995
Russell Maryland	Miami (FL)	Defensive tackle	2011
Terance Mathis	New Mexico	Wide receiver	2023
Ollie Matson	San Francisco	Halfback	1976
Rags Matthews	TCU	End	1971
Johnny Maulbetsch	Adrian, Michigan	Halfback	1973
Pete Mauthe	Penn State	Fullback	1957
Bob Maxwell	Chicago, Swarthmore	Guard	1974
Mark May	Pittsburgh	Guard	2006
Rueben Mayes	Washington State	Running back	2008
George McAfee	Duke	Halfback	1961
Napoleon McCallum	Navy	Running back	2002
Don McCauley	North Carolina	Running back	2001
Lee McClung	Yale	Halfback	1963
Bill McColl	Stanford	End	1973
Jim McCormick	Princeton	Fullback	1954
Randall McDaniel	Arizona State	Guard	2008
Tommy McDonald	Oklahoma	Halfback	1985
Jack McDowall	North Carolina State	Halfback, quarterback	1975
Hugh McElhenny	Washington	Halfback	1981
Gene McEver	Tennessee	Halfback	1954
John McEwan	Army	Center	1962
Banks McFadden	Clemson	Halfback	1959
Darren McFadden	Arkansas	Running back	2019
Bud McFadin	Texas	Offensive line, defensive line	1983
Mike McGee	Duke	Guard	1990
Rich McGeorge	Elon	Tight end	2012
Ed McGinley	Pennsylvania	Tackle	1979
John McGovern	Minnesota	Quarterback	1966
Thurman McGraw	Colorado State	Tackle	1981
Tyrone McGriff	Florida A&M	Guard	1996
Pat McInally	Harvard	Wide receiver	2016
Bob McKay	Texas	Tackle	2017
Mike McKeever	Southern California	Guard	1987
Reggie McKenzie	Michigan	Guard	2002
Bryant McKinnie	Miami (FL)	Tackle	2023
Ronald McKinnon	North Alabama	Linebacker	2008
George McLaren	Pittsburgh	Fullback	1965
Jim McMahon	Brigham Young	Quarterback	1999
Steve McMichael	Texas	Defensive tackle	2009
Dan McMillan	Southern California, California	Tackle	1971
Bo McMillin	Centre	Quarterback	1951
Don McPherson	Syracuse	Quarterback	2008
Steve McNair	Alcorn State	Quarterback	2020
Cade McNown	UCLA	Quarterback	2020
Bob McWhorter	Georgia	Halfback	1954
Steve Meilinger	Kentucky	End, Halfback, Quarterback	2013
Leroy Mercer	Pennsylvania	Fullback	1955
Don Meredith	SMU	Quarterback	1982
Frank Merritt	Army	Tackle	1996
Mark Messner	Michigan	Defensive tackle	2022
Terrence Metcalf	Mississippi	Offensive line	2025
Bert Metzger	Notre Dame	Guard	1982
Wayne Meylan	Nebraska	Linebacker	1991
Joe Micchia	Westminster (PA)	Quarterback	2013
Lou Michaels	Kentucky	Tackle, Kicker	1992
John Michels	Tennessee	Guard	1996
Abe Mickal	LSU	Halfback	1967
Creighton Miller	Notre Dame	Halfback	1976
Don Miller	Notre Dame	Halfback	1970
Edgar Miller	Notre Dame	Tackle	1966
Fred Miller	Notre Dame	Tackle	1985
Shorty Miller	Penn State	Quarterback	1974
Terry Miller	Oklahoma State	Running back	2022
Wayne Millner	Notre Dame	End	1990
Sam Mills	Montclair State	Linebacker	2009
Century Milstead	Wabash, Yale	Tackle	1977
John Minds	Pennsylvania	Fullback	1962
Skip Minisi	Pennsylvania, Navy	Halfback	1985
Rex Mirich	Northern Arizona	Defensive tackle	2012
Lydell Mitchell	Penn State	Running back	2004
Dick Modzelewski	Maryland	Tackle	1993
Chet Moeller	Navy	Safety	2010
Alex Moffat	Princeton	Halfback	1971
Ed Molinski	Tennessee	Guard	1990
Art Monk	Syracuse	Wide receiver	2012
Cliff Montgomery	Columbia	Quarterback	1963
Wilbert Montgomery	Abilene Christian	Running back	1996
Donn Moomaw	UCLA	Center, Linebacker	1973
Corey Moore	Virginia Tech	Defensive line	2023
Herman Moore	Virginia	Wide receiver	2026
Dan Morgan	Miami (FL)	Linebacker	2021
Milt Morin	Massachusetts	Tight end	2010
Bill Morley	Columbia	Halfback, Quarterback	1971
George Morris	Georgia Tech	Center, Linebacker	1981
Larry Morris	Georgia Tech	Center, Linebacker	1992
Bill Morton	Dartmouth	Quarterback	1972
Craig Morton	California	Quarterback	1992
James Moscrip	Stanford	End	1985
Randy Moss	Marshall	Wide receiver, Kick returner	2024
Harold Muller	California	End	1951
Johnny Musso	Alabama	Running back	2000
Greg Myers	Colorado State	Safety	2012
Bronko Nagurski	Minnesota	Fullback	1951
Billy Neighbors	Alabama	Guard	1973
Darrin Nelson	Stanford	Running back	2014
Ernie Nevers	Stanford	Fullback	1971
Marshall Newell	Harvard	Tackle	1957
Harry Newman	Michigan	Halfback	1975
Terence Newman	Kansas State	Cornerback	2026
Ozzie Newsome	Alabama	Tight end	1994
Haloti Ngata	Oregon	Defensive tackle	2025
Dat Nguyen	Texas A&M	Linebacker	2017
Gifford Nielsen	Brigham Young	Quarterback	1994
Dwayne Nix	Texas A&I	Tight end	2003
Tommy Nobis	Texas	Linebacker	1981
Leo Nomellini	Minnesota	Tackle	1977
Jay Novacek	Wyoming	Tight end	2008
Bob Novogratz	Army	Guard	2026
Davey O'Brien	TCU	Quarterback	1955
Ken O'Brien	UC Davis, Sacramento State	Quarterback	1997
Pat O'Dea	Wisconsin	Fullback	1962
John O'Hearn	Cornell	End	1972
Leslie O'Neal	Oklahoma State	Defensive tackle	2020
Charlie O'Rourke	Boston College	Quarterback	1972
Andy Oberlander	Dartmouth	Halfback, Tackle	1954
Bob Odell	Pennsylvania	Halfback	1992
Jonathan Ogden	UCLA	Tackle	2012
Robin Olds	Army	Tackle	1985
Elmer Oliphant	Purdue, Army	Halfback	1955
Merlin Olsen	Utah State	Defensive tackle	1980
Dennis Onkotz	Penn State	Linebacker	1995
Bennie Oosterbaan	Michigan	End	1954
John Orsi	Colgate	End	1982
Herb Orvis	Colorado	Defensive tackle	2016
Winchester Osgood	Cornell, Pennsylvania	Halfback	1970
Bill Osmanski	Holy Cross	Fullback	1973
John Outland	Kansas, Pennsylvania	Tackle, Halfback	2000
George Owen	Harvard	Halfback	1983
Jim Owens	Oklahoma	End	1982
Steve Owens	Oklahoma	Running back	1991
Orlando Pace	Ohio State	Tackle	2013
Alan Page	Notre Dame	Defensive end	1993
Carson Palmer	Southern California	Quarterback	2021
Paul Palmer	Temple	Running back	2018
Joe Palumbo	Virginia	Guard	1999
Jack Pardee	Texas A&M	Fullback, Linebacker	1986
Babe Parilli	Kentucky	Quarterback	1982
Ace Parker	Duke	Quarterback, Halfback	1955
Jackie Parker	Mississippi State	Quarterback	1976
Jim Parker	Ohio State	Guard	1974
Dave Parks	Texas Tech	Wide receiver	2008
Michael Payton	Marshall	Quarterback	2015
Walter Payton	Jackson State	Running back	1999
Vince Pazzetti	Wesleyan, Lehigh	Quarterback	1961
Endicott Peabody	Harvard	Guard	1973
Bob Peck	Pittsburgh	Center	1954
Bob Pellegrini	Maryland	Center, Linebacker	1996
Stan Pennock	Harvard	Guard	1954
Julius Peppers	North Carolina	Defensive end	2024
Adrian Peterson	Georgia Southern	Running back	2017
George Pfann	Cornell	Quarterback	1957
Henry Phillips	Sewanee	Guard	1959
Loyd Phillips	Arkansas	Tackle	1992
Mike Phipps	Purdue	Quarterback	2006
Pete Pihos	Indiana	End	1966
Erny Pinckert	Southern California	Halfback	1957
John Pingel	Michigan State	Halfback	1968
Jake Plummer	Arizona State	Quarterback	2019
Jim Plunkett	Stanford	Quarterback	1990
Art Poe	Princeton	End	1969
Anthony Poindexter	Virginia	Defensive back	2020
Troy Polamalu	Southern California	Safety	2019
David Pollack	Georgia	Defensive end	2020
Fritz Pollard	Brown	Halfback	1954
Barney Poole	Mississippi, North Carolina, Army	End	1974
Paul Posluszny	Penn State	Linebacker	2024
Marvin Powell	Southern California	Tackle	1994
Merv Pregulman	Michigan	Center, Tackle	1982
Eddie Price	Tulane	Fullback	1982
Ron Pritchard	Arizona State	Linebacker	2003
Greg Pruitt	Oklahoma	Running back	1999
Larry Pugh	Westminster (PA)	Guard, Defensive tackle	1998
Peter Pund	Georgia Tech	Center	1963
Buster Ramsey	William & Mary	Guard, Linebacker	1978
John Randle	Texas A&I	Defensive tackle	2008
Ahmad Rashad	Oregon	Running Back, Wide receiver	2007
John Rauch	Georgia	Quarterback	2003
Gary Reasons	Northwestern State	Linebacker	1996
Bill Redell	Occidental	Quarterback, Cornerback	2001
Rick Redman	Washington	Guard, Linebacker	1995
Ed Reed	Miami (FL)	Safety	2018
Claude Reeds	Oklahoma	Fullback	1961
Bill Reid	Harvard	Fullback	1970
Mike Reid	Penn State	Defensive tackle	1987
Steve Reid	Northwestern	Guard	1985
Bob Reifsnyder	Navy	Tackle	1997
Mel Renfro	Oregon	Running back, Defensive back	1986
Ernie Rentner	Northwestern	Halfback	1979
Scott Reppert	Lawrence	Running back	2003
Glenn Ressler	Penn State	Defensive tackle	2001
Bob Reynolds	Stanford	Tackle	1961
Bobby Reynolds	Nebraska	Halfback	1984
Randy Rhino	Georgia Tech	Defensive back	1982
Jerry Rhome	SMU, Tulsa	Quarterback	1998
Jerry Rice	Mississippi Valley State	Wide receiver	2006
Willie Richardson	Jackson State	Wide receiver, Safety	2003
Les Richter	California	Guard, Linebacker	1982
Pat Richter	Wisconsin	End	1996
Jack Riley	Northwestern	Tackle	1988
Dave Rimington	Nebraska	Center	1997
Charles Rinehart	Lafayette	Guard	1964
Jim Ritcher	North Carolina State	Center	1998
Richard Ritchie	Texas A&I	Quarterback	1998
Gabe Rivera	Texas Tech	Defensive tackle	2012
Willie Roaf	Louisiana Tech	Tackle	2014
Calvin Roberts	Gustavus Adolphus	Tackle	2003
J. D. Roberts	Oklahoma	Guard	1993
Paul Robeson	Rutgers	End	1995
Dave Robinson	Penn State	End	1997
Jerry Robinson	UCLA	Linebacker	1996
Tracy Rocker	Auburn	Defensive tackle	2004
Ira Rodgers	West Virginia	Fullback, Quarterback	1957
Johnny Rodgers	Nebraska	Wingback	2000
Eddie Rogers	Carlisle, Minnesota	End	1968
George Rogers	South Carolina	Halfback	1997
Johnny Roland	Missouri	Running back, Defensive back	1998
Joe Romig	Colorado	Guard, Linebacker	1984
Tony Romo	Eastern Illinois	Quarterback	2021
Aaron Rosenberg	Southern California	Guard	1966
Dan Ross	Northeastern	Tight end	2004
Kyle Rote	SMU	Halfback	1964
Joe Routt	Texas A&M	Guard	1962
Brad Rowland	McMurry	Halfback	2008
Bill Royce	Ashland	Defensive end	2016
Mike Rozier	Nebraska	Halfback	2006
Mike Ruth	Boston College	Defensive tackle	2017
Rashaan Salaam	Colorado	Running back	2022
Louis Salmon	Notre Dame	Fullback	1971
Barry Sanders	Oklahoma State	Running back	2003
Deion Sanders	Florida State	Defensive back	2011
Alex Sarkisian	Northwestern	Center, Linebacker	1998
George Sauer	Nebraska	Fullback	1954
George Savitsky	Pennsylvania	Tackle	1991
James Saxton Jr.	Texas	Halfback	1996
Gale Sayers	Kansas	Halfback	1997
Jack Scarbath	Maryland	Quarterback	1983
Hunter Scarlett	Pennsylvania	End	1991
Bob Schloredt	Washington	Quarterback, Defensive back	1989
Joe Schmidt	Pittsburgh	Linebacker	1971
Wear Schoonover	Arkansas	End	1967
Dave Schreiner	Wisconsin	End	1955
Germany Schulz	Michigan	Center	1951
Frank Schwab	Lafayette	Guard	1958
Marchy Schwartz	Notre Dame	Halfback	1974
Paul Schwegler	Washington	Tackle	1967
John Sciarra	UCLA	Quarterback	2014
Clyde Scott	Navy, Arkansas	Fullback	1971
Dick Scott	Navy	Center	1987
Freddie Scott	Amherst	Wide receiver	2001
Jake Scott	Georgia	Safety	2011
Tom Scott	Virginia	End	1979
Henry Seibels	Sewanee	Halfback	1973
Ron Sellers	Florida State	Wide receiver	1988
Dewey Selmon	Oklahoma	Nose guard	2024
Lee Roy Selmon	Oklahoma	Defensive tackle	1988
Harley Sewell	Texas	Guard, Linebacker	2000
William Shakespeare	Notre Dame	Halfback	1983
Sterling Sharpe	South Carolina	Wide Receiver	2014
Art Shell	Maryland Eastern Shore	Tackle, Defensive tackle	2013
Donnie Shell	South Carolina State	Safety	1998
Murray Shelton	Cornell	End	1973
Frank Sheptock	Bloomsburg	Linebacker	2007
Tom Shevlin	Yale	End	1954
Will Shields	Nebraska	Guard	2011
Bernie Shively	Illinois	Guard	1982
Rod Shoate	Oklahoma	Linebacker	2013
Jeff Siemon	Stanford	Linebacker	2006
Ron Simmons	Florida State	Defensive tackle	2008
Mark Simoneau	Kansas State	Linebacker	2012
Monk Simons	Tulane	Halfback	1963
O. J. Simpson	Southern California	Running back	1983
Billy Sims	Oklahoma	Running back	1995
Kenneth Sims	Texas	Defensive tackle	2021
Mike Singletary	Baylor	Linebacker	1995
Fred Sington	Alabama	Tackle	1955
Frank Sinkwich	Georgia	Halfback	1954
Jerry Sisemore	Texas	Tackle	2002
Red Sitko	Notre Dame	Halfback, Fullback	1984
Joe Skladany	Pittsburgh	End	1975
Duke Slater	Iowa	Tackle	1951
Steve Slaton	West Virginia	Running back	2025
Alex Smith	Utah	Quarterback	2024
Billy Ray Smith	Arkansas	Defensive end	2000
Bruce B. Smith	Virginia Tech	Defensive end	2006
Bruce P. Smith	Minnesota	Halfback	1972
Bubba Smith	Michigan State	Defensive end	1988
Darrin Smith	Miami (FL)	Linebacker	2025
Emmitt Smith	Florida	Running back	2006
Ernie Smith	Southern California	Tackle	1970
Harry Smith	Southern California	Guard	1955
Jim Ray Smith	Baylor	Tackle	1987
John Smith	Notre Dame	Guard	1975
Kevin Smith	Texas A&M	Cornerback	2024
Leonard Smith	McNeese State	Defensive back	2014
Riley Smith	Alabama	Quarterback	1985
Rod Smith	Missouri Southern	Wide receiver	2009
Vernon Smith	Georgia	End	1979
Neil Snow	Michigan	End, Fullback	1960
Percy Snow	Michigan State	Linebacker	2013
Gary Spani	Kansas State	Linebacker	2002
Al Sparlis	UCLA	Guard	1983
Bill Spears	Vanderbilt	Quarterback	1962
Clarence Spears	Knox, Dartmouth	Guard	1955
Chris Spielman	Ohio State	Linebacker	2009
C. J. Spiller	Clemson	Running back, Kick returner	2021
Bill Sprackling	Brown	Quarterback	1964
Bud Sprague	Texas, Army	Tackle	1970
Darren Sproles	Kansas State	Running back	2021
Steve Spurrier	Florida	Quarterback, Head Coach	1986
Harrison Stafford	Texas	Halfback	1975
Amos Alonzo Stagg	Yale	End, Halfback	1951
Bill Stanfill	Georgia	Defensive tackle	1998
Max Starcevich	Washington	Guard	1990
Larry Station	Iowa	Linebacker	2009
Roger Staubach	Navy	Quarterback	1981
Walter Steffen	Chicago	Halfback, Quarterback	1969
Joe Steffy	Tennessee, Army	Guard	1987
Herb Stein	Pittsburgh	Center, Guard	1967
Bob Stein	Minnesota	Linebacker	2020
Sandy Stephens	Minnesota	Quarterback, Defensive back	2011
Bob Steuber	Missouri, DePauw	Halfback	1971
Mal Stevens	Washburn, Yale	Quarterback	1974
Ben Stevenson	Tuskegee	Halfback	2003
Vince Stevenson	Pennsylvania	Quarterback	1968
Art Still	Kentucky	Defensive end	2015
Jim Stillwagon	Ohio State	Defensive tackle	1991
Gaylord Stinchcomb	Ohio State	Halfback	1973
Matt Stinchcomb	Georgia	Tackle	2018
Michael Stonebreaker	Notre Dame	Linebacker	2023
Jerry Stovall	LSU	Halfback, Defensive back	2008
Michael Strahan	Texas Southern	Defensive line	2025
Brock Strom	Air Force	Tackle	1985
Bill Stromberg	Johns Hopkins	Wide receiver	2004
Ken Strong	NYU	Halfback	1957
Everett Strupper	Georgia Tech	Halfback	1972
Harry Stuhldreher	Notre Dame	Quarterback	1958
Herbert Sturhahn	Yale	Guard	1981
Joe Stydahar	West Virginia	Tackle	1972
Bob Suffridge	Tennessee	Guard	1961
Ndamukong Suh	Nebraska	Defensive tackle	2026
Steve Suhey	Penn State	Guard	1985
Pat Sullivan	Auburn	Quarterback	1991
Frank Sundstrom	Cornell	Tackle	1978
Lynn Swann	Southern California	Wide receiver	1993
Clarence Swanson	Nebraska	End	1973
Bill Swiacki	Holy Cross, Columbia	End	1976
Pat Swilling	Georgia Tech	Linebacker	2009
Jim Swink	TCU	Halfback	1980
Eddie Talboom	Wyoming	Halfback	2000
George Taliaferro	Indiana	Halfback	1981
Darryl Talley	West Virginia	Linebacker	2011
Fran Tarkenton	Georgia	Quarterback	1987
Jack Tatum	Ohio State	Defensive back	2004
John Tavener	Indiana	Center	1990
Aaron Taylor	Nebraska	Center, Guard	2018
Aaron Taylor	Notre Dame	Offensive tackle	2021
Bruce Taylor	Boston University	Cornerback	1997
Chuck Taylor	Stanford	Guard	1984
Tim Tebow	Florida	Quarterback	2023
Vinny Testaverde	Miami (FL)	Quarterback	2013
Joe Theismann	Notre Dame	Quarterback	2003
Aurealius Thomas	Ohio State	Guard, Linebacker	1989
Clendon Thomas	Oklahoma	Halfback	2011
Dennis Thomas	Alcorn State	Center	2022
Derrick Thomas	Alabama	Linebacker	2014
Joe Thomas	Wisconsin	Tackle	2019
Scott Thomas	Air Force	Defensive back	2012
Thurman Thomas	Oklahoma State	Running back	2008
Zach Thomas	Texas Tech	Linebacker	2015
Anthony Thompson	Indiana	Running back	2007
Joe Thompson	Geneva, Pittsburgh	Halfback	1971
Lynn Thomsen	Augustana College	Defensive tackle	1997
Sam Thorne	Yale	Halfback	1970
Jim Thorpe	Carlisle	Halfback	1951
Dennis Thurman	Southern California	Defensive back	2025
Ben Ticknor	Harvard	Center	1954
John Tigert	Vanderbilt	Halfback, Fullback	1970
Pat Tillman	Arizona State	Safety	2010
Gaynell Tinsley	LSU	End	1956
Andre Tippett	Iowa	Defensive end	2021
Eric Tipton	Duke	Halfback	1965
LaDainian Tomlinson	TCU	Running back	2014
Clayton Tonnemaker	Minnesota	Center, Linebacker	1980
Gino Torretta	Miami (FL)	Quarterback	2009
Bob Torrey	Pennsylvania	Guard	1971
Willie Totten	Mississippi Valley State	Quarterback	2005
Randy Trautman	Boise State	Defensive tackle	1999
Ed Travis	Tarkio, Missouri	Tackle	1974
Charley Trippi	Georgia	Halfback	1959
Don Trull	Baylor	Quarterback	2013
Ed Tryon	Colgate	Halfback	1963
Jerry Tubbs	Oklahoma	Fullback, Center, Linebacker	1996
Arnold Tucker	Army, Miami (FL)	Quarterback	2008
Jessie Tuggle	Valdosta State	Linebacker	2007
Bulldog Turner	Hardin-Simmons	Center	1960
Howard Twilley	Tulsa	Wide receiver	1992
Brian Urlacher	New Mexico	Linebacker, Safety	2017
Joe Utay	Texas A&M	Halfback	1974
Mike Utley	Washington State	Guard	2016
Norm Van Brocklin	Oregon	Quarterback	1966
Brad Van Pelt	Michigan State	Safety	2001
Dale Van Sickel	Florida	End	1975
Harry Van Surdam	Wesleyan	Quarterback	1972
Dexter Very	Penn State	End	1976
Bill Vessels	Oklahoma	Halfback	1974
Ernie Vick	Michigan	Center	1983
Michael Vick	Virginia Tech	Quarterback	2025
Troy Vincent	Wisconsin	Defensive back	2023
Hube Wagner	Pittsburgh	End	1973
Rob Waldrop	Arizona	Defensive tackle	2011
Doak Walker	SMU	Halfback	1959
Herschel Walker	Georgia	Running back	1999
Bill Wallace	Rice	Halfback	1978
Wesley Walls	Mississippi	Defensive end, Tight end	2014
Adam Walsh	Notre Dame	Center	1968
Cotton Warburton	Southern California	Quarterback	1975
Bob Ward	Maryland	Guard	1980
Charlie Ward	Florida State	Quarterback	2006
Chris Ward	Ohio State	Tackle	2024
Andre Ware	Houston	Quarterback	2004
Bill Warner	Cornell	Guard	1971
Curt Warner	Penn State	Running back	2009
Peter Warrick	Florida State	Wide Receiver	2026
Gene Washington	Michigan State	Wide receiver	2011
Joe Washington	Oklahoma	Running back	2005
Kenny Washington	UCLA	Tailback	1956
Jim Weatherall	Oklahoma	Tackle	1992
George Webster	Michigan State	Linebacker	1987
Eric Weddle	Utah	Safety	2026
Herman Wedemeyer	Saint Mary's	Halfback	1979
Harold Weekes	Columbia	Halfback	1954
Roger Wehrli	Missouri	Cornerback	2003
Art Weiner	North Carolina	End	1992
Ed Weir	Nebraska	Tackle	1951
Gus Welch	Carlisle	Quarterback	1975
John Weller	Princeton	Guard	1957
Percy Wendell	Harvard	Halfback	1972
Belford West	Colgate	Tackle	1954
Brian Westbrook	Villanova	Running back	2023
Michael Westbrook	Colorado	Wide receiver	2020
Bob Westfall	Michigan	Tackle	1987
Alex Weyand	Army	Tackle	1974
Charles Wharton	Pennsylvania	Guard	1963
Art Wheeler	Princeton	Guard	1969
Byron White	Colorado	Halfback	1954
Charles White	Southern California	Running back	1996
Danny White	Arizona State	Quarterback	1998
Ed White	California	Defensive tackle	1999
Lorenzo White	Michigan State	Running back	2019
Randy White	Maryland	Defensive tackle	1994
Reggie White	Tennessee	Defensive tackle	2002
Wilson Whitley	Houston	Defensive tackle	2007
Don Whitmire	Alabama, Navy	Tackle	1956
Frank Wickhorst	Navy	Tackle	1970
Ed Widseth	Minnesota	Tackle	1954
Zach Wiegert	Nebraska	Tackle	2022
Paul Wiggin	Stanford	Defensive tackle	2005
Dick Wildung	Minnesota	Tackle	1957
Alfred Williams	Colorado	Linebacker	2010
Bob Williams	Notre Dame	Quarterback	1988
David Williams	Illinois	Wide receiver	2005
DeAngelo Williams	Memphis	Running back	2023
Doug Williams	Grambling	Quarterback	2001
James Williams	Rice	End	1965
Reggie Williams	Dartmouth	Linebacker	2007
Ricky Williams	Texas	Running back	2015
Roy Williams	Oklahoma	Defensive back	2022
Bill Willis	Ohio State	Tackle	1971
Patrick Willis	Mississippi	Linebacker	2019
Al Wilson	Tennessee	Linebacker	2020
Bobby Wilson	SMU	Halfback	1973
George Wilson	Lafayette	Halfback	1988
George Wilson	Washington	Halfback	1951
Harry Wilson	Penn State, Army	Halfback	1973
Marc Wilson	Brigham Young	Quarterback	1996
Kellen Winslow	Missouri	Tight end	2002
Albert Wistert	Michigan	Tackle	1968
Alvin Wistert	Boston University, Michigan	Tackle	1981
Francis Wistert	Michigan	Tackle	1967
Grant Wistrom	Nebraska	Defensive end	2009
Jeff Wittman	Ithaca	Running back	2013
Scott Woerner	Georgia	Safety	2016
Alex Wojciechowicz	Fordham	Center	1955
Barry Wood	Harvard	Quarterback	1980
Richard Wood	Southern California	Linebacker	2007
Danny Woodhead	Chadron State	Running back	2024
Charles Woodson	Michigan	Cornerback	2018
Rod Woodson	Purdue	Cornerback	2016
John Wooten	Colorado	Tackle	2012
Elmo Wright	Houston	Wide receiver	2020
Danny Wuerffel	Florida	Quarterback	2013
Andy Wyant	Bucknell, Chicago	Center, Guard	1962
Bowden Wyatt	Tennessee	End	1972
Clint Wyckoff	Cornell	Quarterback	1970
Ryan Yarborough	Wyoming	Wide receiver	2025
Tommy Yarr	Notre Dame	Center	1987
Ron Yary	Southern California	Tackle	1987
Lloyd Yoder	Carnegie Tech	Tackle	1982
Buddy Young	Illinois	Halfback	1968
Charle Young	Southern California	Tight end	2004
Harry Young	Marshall, Washington & Lee	Halfback	1958
Steve Young	Brigham Young	Quarterback	2001
Vince Young	Texas	Quarterback	2019
Waddy Young	Oklahoma	End	1986
Jack Youngblood	Florida	Defensive end	1992
Jim Youngblood	Tennessee Tech	Linebacker	1996
Paul "Tank" Younger	Grambling	Fullback, Linebacker	2000
Gust Zarnas	Ohio State	Guard	1975
Chris Zorich	Notre Dame	Defensive tackle	2007

== See also ==
- List of College Football Hall of Fame inductees (coaches)
