= Thomsen =

Origin
- Meaning: son of Thomas
- Region of origin: Denmark

Other names
- Variant forms: Thomason, Thomson, Thompson

Thomsen is a Danish patronymic surname meaning 'son of Tom (or Thomas)', itself derived from the Aramaic תום or Tôm, meaning "twin". There are many varied surname spellings, with the first historical record believed to be found in 1252. Thomsen is uncommon as a given name.

People with the surname Thomsen include:

== B ==
- Britta Thomsen (born 1954), Danish politician and member of the European Parliament

== C ==
- Cecilie Thomsen (born 1974), Danish actress and model
- Christian Jürgensen Thomsen (1788–1865), Danish archaeologist
- Claus Thomsen (born 1970), Danish former professional footballer

== E ==
- Ebba Thomsen (1887–1973), Danish actress

== F ==
- Finn Thomsen (born 1955), Danish motorcycle speedway rider
- Fred Thomsen (1897–1986), American college football player and coach

== G ==
- Gerhard Thomsen (1899–1934), German mathematician who worked in various branches of geometry
- Grímur Thomsen (1820–1896), Icelandic poet and editor
- Grover C. Thomsen, Danish-American chemist who created the soft drink Big Red (drink) in 1937
- Gunnar H. Thomsen, Faroese musician and member of Týr (band), a Faroese heavy metal band active 1998–present

== H ==
- Hans Peter Jørgen Julius Thomsen (1826–1909), Danish chemist noted in thermochemistry for the Thomsen–Berthelot principle
- Hasse Thomsén (1942–2004), Swedish heavyweight boxer
- Helle Thomsen (1970), Danish handball player

== I ==
- Ib Thomsen (born 1961), Norwegian politician

== J ==
- Johnny Thomsen (born 1982), Danish footballer

== K ==
- Knud Vad Thomsen (1905–1971) Danish composer

== L ==
- Linda Chatman Thomsen (born 1954), American lawyer and public servant
- Lynn Thomsen (born 1964), former American football player

== M ==
- Mads Thomsen (born 1989), Danish former professional football forward
- Mark A. Thomsen (born 1956), American operatic tenor
- Marlene Thomsen (born 1971), Danish former badminton player
- Martha Thomsen (born 1957), American model
- Martinus Thomsen (1890–1981), Danish writer and mystic
- Moritz Thomsen (1915–1991), American farmer and writer
- Máximo Thomsen (born 1999), Argentinian rugbier and convicted murderer

== P ==
- Philipp Thomsen, a perpetually drunken Kriegsmarine submarine commander in the book and film Das Boot
- Pia Thomsen, Danish cricketer
- Poul Mathias Thomsen, Danish economist working for the International Monetary Fund

== S ==
- Sonja Thomsen (born 1978), American artist
- Søren Ulrik Thomsen (born 1956), Danish poet
- Stu Thomsen (born 1958), American former bicycle motocross (BMX) racer
- Sven Thomsen (1884–1968), Danish competitive sailor

== T ==
- Tina Thomsen (born 1975), Danish-born Australian actress
- Tue Bjørn Thomsen (1972–2006), Danish professional boxer

== U ==
- Ulrich Thomsen (born 1963), Danish actor

== V ==
- Vern Thomsen, American college football coach, 1983–1987
- Vilhelm Thomsen (1842–1927), Danish linguist
