= Calvin Roberts =

Calvin Roberts may refer to:

- Calvin Roberts (American football)
- Calvin Roberts (politician)

== See also ==
- Cal Roberts (disambiguation)
