= Emmitt Smith =

American football player (born 1969)

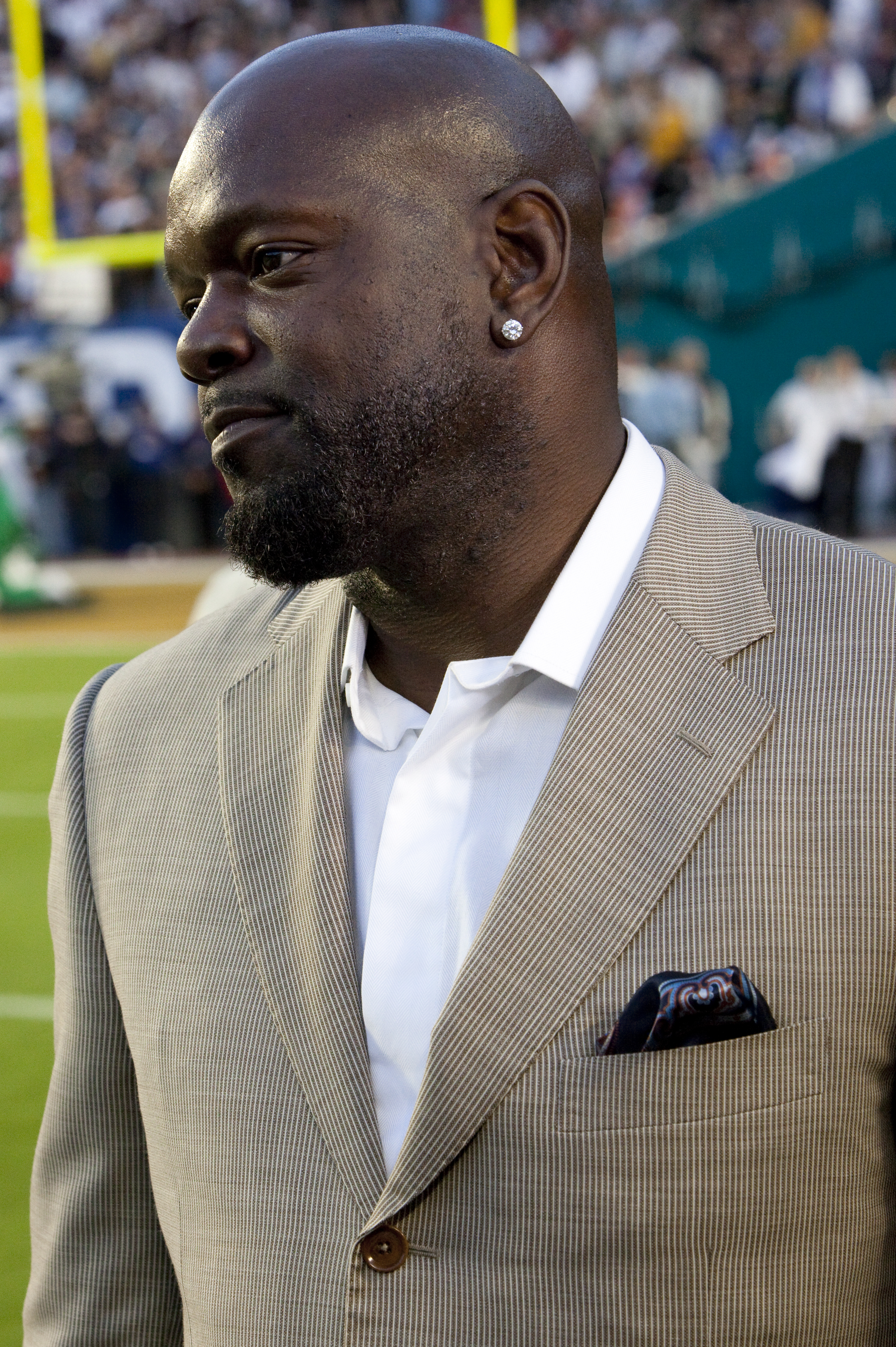
- Smith in 2010

No. 22
- Position: Running back

Personal information
- Born: May 15, 1969 (age 57); Pensacola, Florida, U.S.
- Listed height: 5 ft 9 in (1.75 m)
- Listed weight: 221 lb (100 kg)

Career information
- High school: Escambia (Pensacola)
- College: Florida (1987–1989)
- NFL draft: 1990: 1st round, 17th overall pick

Career history
- Dallas Cowboys (1990–2002); Arizona Cardinals (2003–2004)

Awards and highlights
- 3× Super Bowl champion (XXVII, XXVIII, XXX); Super Bowl MVP (XXVIII); NFL Most Valuable Player (1993); NFL Offensive Rookie of the Year (1990); 4× First-team All-Pro (1992–1995); Second-team All-Pro (1991); 8× Pro Bowl (1990–1995, 1998, 1999); 4× NFL rushing yards leader (1991–1993, 1995); 3× NFL rushing touchdowns leader (1992, 1994, 1995); NFL scoring leader (1995); NFL 1990s All-Decade Team; NFL 100th Anniversary All-Time Team; SN Athlete of the Year (1994); PFWA All-Rookie Team (1990); Dallas Cowboys Ring of Honor; Unanimous All-American (1989); SEC Most Valuable Player (1989); SEC Freshman of the Year (1987); 3× First team All-SEC (1987–1989); Florida Football Ring of Honor; NFL records: Most career rushing yards: 18,355; Most career rushing touchdowns: 164; Most career rushing attempts: 4,409

Career NFL statistics
- Rushing yards: 18,355
- Rushing average: 4.2
- Rushing touchdowns: 164
- Receptions: 515
- Receiving yards: 3,224
- Receiving touchdowns: 11
- Stats at Pro Football Reference
- Pro Football Hall of Fame
- College Football Hall of Fame

Emmitt James Smith III (born May 15, 1969) is an American former professional football running back who played in the National Football League (NFL) for 15 seasons, primarily with the Dallas Cowboys. He is the league's all-time leading rusher, and is widely considered to be one of the greatest running backs of all time.

Smith grew up in Pensacola, Florida, and became the second-leading rusher in American high school football history while playing for Escambia High School. Smith played three years of college football for the Florida Gators, setting several school rushing records. After being named a unanimous All-American in 1989, Smith chose to forgo his senior year of eligibility and play professionally.

The Cowboys selected Smith in the first round of the 1990 NFL draft with the 17th overall pick. During his long professional career, he rushed for 18,355 yards, breaking the record formerly held by Walter Payton. He also holds the record for career rushing touchdowns with 164. Smith is the only running back to ever win a Super Bowl championship, the NFL Most Valuable Player award, the NFL rushing crown, and the Super Bowl Most Valuable Player award all in the same season (1993). He is also one of four running backs to lead the NFL in rushing three or more consecutive seasons, joining Steve Van Buren, Jim Brown, and Earl Campbell. Smith led the league in rushing and won the Super Bowl in the same year three times (1992, 1993, and 1995) when to that point it had never been done. Smith is also one of only two non-kickers in NFL history to score more than 1,000 career points (the other being Jerry Rice). Smith was inducted to the Pro Football Hall of Fame in 2010 and the College Football Hall of Fame in 2006.

Smith played 13 seasons with the Cowboys and two with the Arizona Cardinals. While playing for Dallas, Smith plus quarterback Troy Aikman and wide receiver Michael Irvin were known as "The Triplets," and led their team to three Super Bowl wins during the 1990s.

== Early life ==
Smith was born in Pensacola, Florida, the son of Mary J. Smith and Emmitt James Smith Jr. At the age of eight, he played his first organized football game on a team that was sponsored by the Salvation Army. He attended Escambia High School in Pensacola, where he played high school football and ran track for the Escambia Gators. During Smith's high school football career, Escambia won two state football championships, and Smith rushed for 106 touchdowns and 8,804 yards, which was the second most yardage in the history of American high school football at the time. Emmitt rushed for over 100 yards in 45 of the 49 games he started for Escambia (including the last 28 in a row) and finished with a 7.8 yards per carry average. Twice, he broke the 2,000-yard rushing mark in a season. In track & field, Smith competed as a sprinter and was a member of the 4 × 100 m (42.16 s) relay squad.

For his efforts, Smith was named the 1986 national high school player of the year by several publications and organizations, including USA Today, Parade Magazine, and Gatorade. In 2007, twenty years after Smith graduated from high school, the Florida High School Athletic Association (FHSAA) named Smith to its All-Century Team and recognized him as the Florida high school football "Player of the Century."

Despite his accomplishments and accolades, some college recruiting analysts opined that he was too small and slow to succeed in major college football when he signed to play for the University of Florida. Recruiting expert Max Emfinger didn't list Smith among the top 50 high school running backs in his high school class and opined that, "Emmitt Smith is a lugger, not a runner. He's not fast. He can't get around the corner. When he falls flat on his face, remember where you heard it first."

== College career ==
=== 1987 season ===
Smith accepted an athletic scholarship to attend the University of Florida in Gainesville, where he played for coach Galen Hall's Gators for three seasons (1987–1989). He did not start the first two games of his college career in the fall of 1987, but made the most of his opportunities in a second-week rout of Tulsa in which he gained 109 yards on just ten carries, including a 66-yard touchdown run. That performance earned him a spot in the starting lineup the following week in the Gators' SEC opener against Alabama at Legion Field.

In his first collegiate start, Smith promptly broke Florida's 57-year-old all-time single game rushing record held by Red Bethea, carrying 39 times for 224 yards and two touchdowns as the Gators upset the Crimson Tide. Smith went on to break the 1,000-yard barrier in the seventh game of his freshman season, the fastest any running back had ever broken that barrier to begin his college career. He finished the season with 229 carries for 1,341 yards and 13 touchdowns. He was named SEC and National Freshman of the Year, and was ninth in the balloting for the Heisman Trophy. He earned the most votes for an underclassman with the eight finishing ahead of him being seniors.

=== 1988 season ===
The Gators got off to a 5–0 start in 1988 with Smith averaging over 120 rushing yards per game. However, during the sixth contest against Memphis State in mid-October, he was sidelined with a sprained knee while starting quarterback Kyle Morris broke his finger, leading to an upset loss. Smith was unable to return to action for a month, during which Florida lost four games in a row and did not score a touchdown in 14 consecutive quarters of play, including a 16–0 loss to Auburn that is their most recent shutout to date.

Smith returned to the lineup in mid-November and Florida won two of its final three games, highlighted by a victory in the All-American Bowl in which he ran 55-yards for a touchdown on the first play from scrimmage and was named the game's MVP. Smith rushed for 988 yards on the year (not including the bowl game) at 110 yards per game, the lowest totals of his college career.

=== 1989 season ===
Smith stayed healthy throughout his junior season in 1989 and found success again. He finished the campaign with Florida records for rushing yards in a season (1,599), rushing yards in a single game (316 versus New Mexico in October 1989), longest rushing play (96 yards against Mississippi State in 1988), career rushing yards (3,928), career rushing yards per game (126.7), and career rushing touchdowns (36), among many others. In all, Smith owned 58 school records at the conclusion of his Florida career despite playing on Florida teams with virtually no passing game, which made him the focal point of opposing defenses.

At the conclusion of his junior season in 1989, Smith was named a first-team All-SEC selection for the third year and SEC Player of the Year, was a unanimous first-team All-American, and finished seventh in the Heisman Trophy balloting. In his final game in the Freedom Bowl, he had few rushing attempts after Florida fell behind Washington early and was forced to throw.

Days later on January 1, 1990, Steve Spurrier was introduced as the Gators' new head coach. Smith, concerned about his potential role in Spurrier's reportedly pass-first offense, decided to forgo his senior year at Florida and enter the NFL draft, which for the first time in history allowed juniors to be eligible. (Note: Smith's school rushing record would be broken by Errict Rhett, Spurrier's first starting running back at Florida, albeit over four seasons instead of three and on 173 more rushing attempts.) Smith returned to the university during the NFL off-season and completed his bachelor's degree in 1996.

Smith was subsequently inducted into the University of Florida Athletic Hall of Fame as a "Gator Great" in 1999, the Gator Football Ring of Honor and the College Football Hall of Fame in 2006. As part of a series of articles written for The Gainesville Sun in 2006, he was recognized as the No. 3 all-time player among the top 100 from the first 100 years of the Gators football program.

== Professional career ==
=== Dallas Cowboys ===
==== 1990 season ====
In the 1990 NFL draft, the Dallas Cowboys considered drafting linebacker James Francis with their first round selection, but after he was taken by the Cincinnati Bengals, the Cowboys focused on improving their running game when Smith started dropping, because despite his collegiate success, some NFL teams still felt that Smith was too small and slow for the pro game. The Cowboys traded up with the Pittsburgh Steelers moving from the 21st to the 17th pick, in exchange for a third round draft choice (#81-Craig Veasey), to select Smith in the first round. He missed all of the preseason after having the longest holdout by a rookie in franchise history. After a quiet start to his professional career, he scored his first NFL touchdown on a two-yard carry in Week 3 against Washington. In Week 5, against the Tampa Bay Buccaneers, he had 23 carries for 121 yards and a touchdown for his first game going over 100 yards in the 14–10 victory. In Week 11, he had four receptions for 117 yards in a 24–21 win over the Los Angeles Rams. In Week 12, he had 23 carries for 132 yards and two touchdowns against Washington in a 27–17 victory. He had 24 carries for 103 yards and four touchdowns in a 41–10 victory over the Phoenix Cardinals in Week 15. He started 15 games and rushed for 937 yards and 11 touchdowns, while being named NFL Offensive Rookie of the Year and receiving Pro Bowl honors. He was named to the 1990 NFL All-Rookie Team.

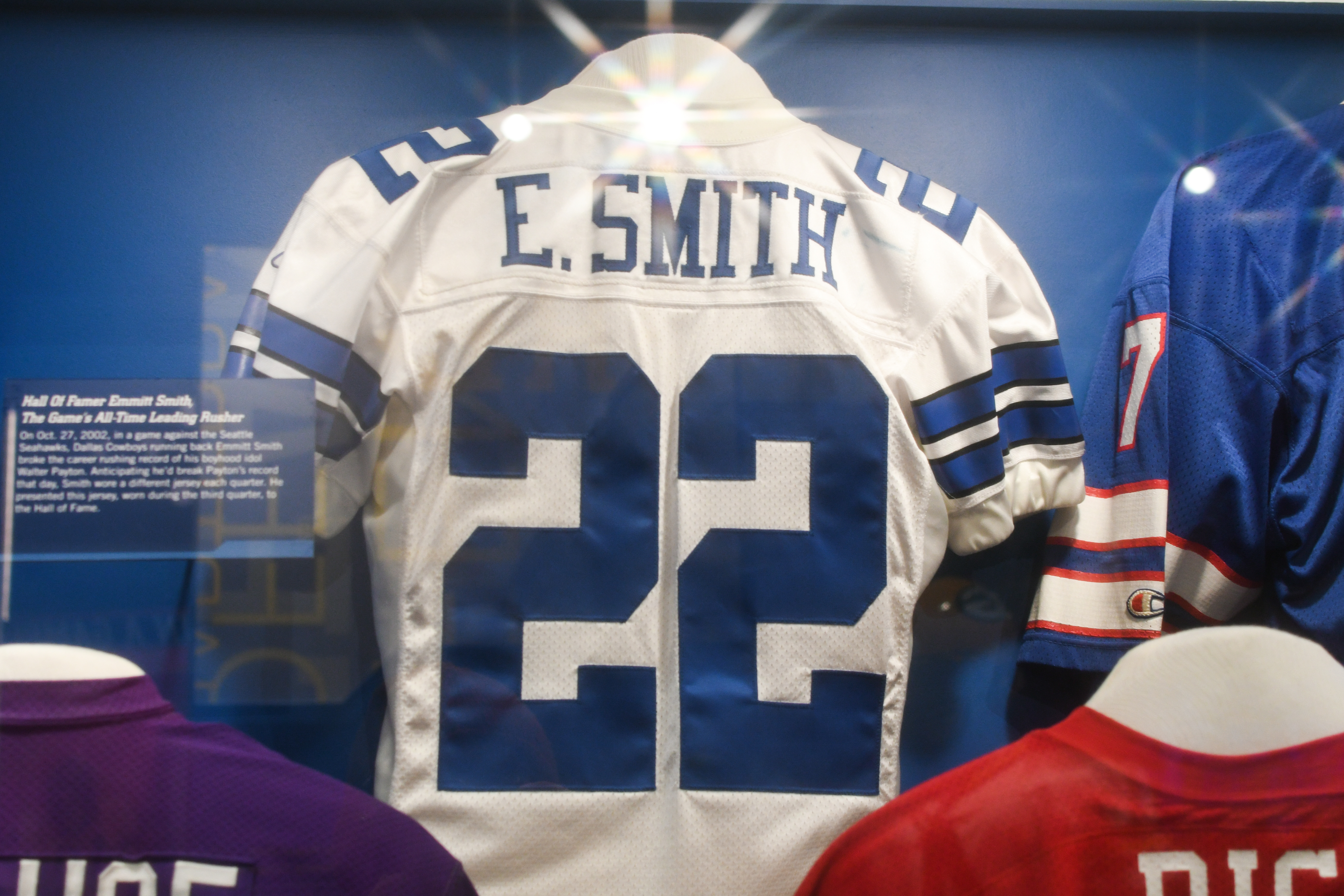
Smith's #22 Cowboys jersey exhibited at the Pro Football Hall of Fame

==== 1991 season ====
In Week 4 of the 1991 season, Smith had 23 carries for 182 yards and two touchdowns in a 17–9 win over the Phoenix Cardinals. At the time, the 182 yards marked a career high for Smith. In Week 10, he had three rushing touchdowns against the Phoenix Cardinals in a 27–7 win. In Week 17 against the Atlanta Falcons, he had 32 carries for 160 yards and two touchdowns in a 31–27 win. He was named NFC Offensive Player of the Month for December 1991. In the 1991 season, he had 1,563 rushing yards and 12 touchdowns. He also clinched the first of four rushing titles, after tallying 160 yards against the Atlanta Falcons in the season finale. He earned Pro Bowl honors for the 1991 season. He made his postseason debut in the Wild Card Round against the Chicago Bears. He had 26 carries for 105 yards and a touchdown in the 17–13 win.

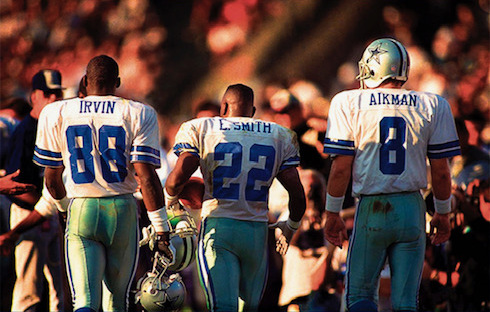
The trio (pictured) of Troy Aikman, Emmitt Smith, and Michael Irvin nicknamed "The Triplets" won three Super Bowls and is considered one of the greatest in NFL history.

==== 1992 season ====
To open the 1992 season, Smith had 27 carries for 140 yards and a touchdown in a 23–10 win over Washington. In Week 8, he had 29 carries for 152 yards and three touchdowns in a 28–13 win over the Los Angeles Raiders. In the following game, he had 30 carries for 163 yards in a 20–10 win over the Philadelphia Eagles. In the next game, a 37–3 win over the Detroit Lions, he had three rushing touchdowns. In Week 16, he had 24 carries for 174 yards and two touchdowns in a 41–17 win over the Atlanta Falcons. Smith was named NFC Player of the Month for both November and December 1992. In 1992, he set the Cowboys' single-season franchise record and won the rushing title with 1,713 yards. He also became the first player to win the league's rushing title and the Super Bowl in the same season. He earned Pro Bowl honors for the third consecutive season. He was named first team All-Pro for the first time. In the Divisional Round against the Philadelphia Eagles, he had 25 carries for 114 yards and a touchdown in the 34–10 win. In the NFC Championship, he had 24 carries for 114 yards and a rushing touchdown to with a receiving touchdown in the 30–20 win over the San Francisco 49ers. In Super Bowl XXVII, he had 22 carries for 108 yards and one touchdown in the 52–17 win over the Buffalo Bills.

==== 1993 season ====
In 1993, Smith missed all of training camp and the first two regular season games due to a contract holdout. The Cowboys lost both contests with rookie Derrick Lassic running in his place. With the season in jeopardy the Cowboys relented and reached an agreement, making Smith the highest paid running back in the league. Smith had 1,486 rushing yards, nine touchdowns, and helped the Cowboys become the first team to win a Super Bowl after starting the season 0–2. He also received the league MVP and the Super Bowl XXVIII MVP award. He was also named The Sporting News NFL Player of the Year. On October 31, he rushed 30 times for a career-high 237 rushing yards against the Philadelphia Eagles, which set the single-season franchise record. In Week 11, he had 182 scrimmage yards and a rushing touchdown against the Phoenix Cardinals. The game marked his second career game with over 100 receiving yards. In Week 14, he had 23 carries for 172 yards in a 23–17 win over the Philadelphia Eagles. In Week 17, he had 21 carries for 153 yards and a touchdown in the 38–3 win over Washington. His career signature game came in the season finale against the New York Giants, with the Cowboys desperately trying to clinch the NFC East title and a first-round bye in the playoffs, Smith suffered a first-degree separation in his right shoulder during the first half, but still finished with 229 total yards and played a key role in a 16–13 overtime win. He was named NFC Player of the Month for December. He made the Pro Bowl for the fourth consecutive season. He was named first team All-Pro for the second consecutive season. In the NFC Championship, he had 173 scrimmage yards to go with a rushing touchdown and a receiving touchdown in the 38–21 win over the San Francisco 49ers. In Super Bowl XXVIII, he had 30 carries for 132 yards and two touchdowns in the 30–13 win over the Buffalo Bills.

==== 1994 season ====
To open the 1994 season, Smith had 31 carries for 171 yards and a touchdown in a 26–9 win over the Pittsburgh Steelers on the road. In Week 10, he carried the ball a career-high 35 times for 163 yards and two touchdowns in a 38–10 win over the New York Giants. The game against the Giants started a five-game streak of two rushing touchdowns in each game for Smith. In Week 13 against the Green Bay Packers, he had 228 scrimmage yards and two rushing touchdowns in the 42–31 victory. He finished the 1994 season with a franchise record seven games with multiple rushing touchdowns. The 1994 season saw Smith led the league with 21 rushing touchdowns, a new career-high despite battling a hamstring pull late in the season. He made the Pro Bowl for the fifth straight season. He had 368 carries for 1,484 yards to go with his rushing touchdowns. He was named The Sporting News Athlete of the Year. Smith was named first team All-Pro for the third consecutive season. However, the Cowboys lost the NFC Championship Game to the San Francisco 49ers 38–28 with Smith having two rushing touchdowns.

==== 1995 season ====
In Week 1 of the 1995 season, Smith tied his single-game career-high for rushing touchdowns with four to with 21 carries for 163 yards in a 35–0 win over the New York Giants. In Week 3, a 23–17 overtime win, he had 20 carries for 150 yards and two touchdowns. He was named NFC Player of the Month for September. In Week 4, he had 169 scrimmage yards and two rushing touchdowns in a 34–20 win over the Arizona Cardinals. In Week 9, against the Atlanta Falcons, he had 197 scrimmage yards and one rushing touchdown in the 28–13 win. In Week 10 against the Philadelphia Eagles, he had 180 scrimmage yards and two rushing touchdowns. In Week 12, against the Oakland Raiders, he had 29 carries for 110 yards and three touchdowns in the 34–21 win.

In 1995, Smith became the first player in league history to rush for 1,400 rushing yards or more in five consecutive seasons and set the NFL record with 25 rushing touchdowns. Smith, Adrian Peterson, and LaDainian Tomlinson are the only players with seven straight ten-touchdown seasons to start their careers. He also broke two of Tony Dorsett's Dallas franchise rushing records, the first for most consecutive initial games of a season with 100+ rushing yards (Smith's four to Dorsett's three) and the second for single-season rushing yards (1,773 to Dorsett's 1,646). Both records would hold for 19 years until 2014, when DeMarco Murray rushed for at least 100 yards in each of his first eight games and accumulated 1,845 rushing yards over the course of the season. In the 1995 season, he finished with 377 carries for 1,773 rushing yards and 25 touchdowns to go with 62 receptions for 375 yards. Smith became the first player in franchise history to have multiple seasons of at least 2,000 scrimmage yards. He was named first team All-Pro for the fourth consecutive season. He earned Pro Bowl honors for the sixth consecutive season. In the NFC Championship, a 38–27 win over the Green Bay Packers, he rushed 35 times for a playoff career-high 150 yards and three touchdowns. He won his third Super Bowl when the Cowboys defeated the Steelers 27–17 in Super Bowl XXX. Smith had 18 carries for 49 yards and two touchdowns in the game.

==== 1996 season ====
In Week 7 of the 1996 season, Smith had 21 carries for 112 yards and two touchdowns in the 17–3 win over the Arizona Cardinals. In Week 8, he had two rushing touchdowns and a receiving touchdown as the Cowboys defeated the Falcons 32–28. In Week 14, he had 29 carries for 155 yards and three touchdowns in a 21–10 win over Washington. In 1996, he scored his 100th career rushing touchdown and surpassed 10,000 career rushing yards, becoming just the twelfth player in league history and the youngest one to reach this milestone. He finished the 1996 season with 327 carries for 1,204 yards and 12 rushing touchdowns to go with 47 receptions for 249 yards and three touchdowns. In the Wild Card Round, he had 17 carries for 116 yards and two touchdowns in the 40–15 win over the Minnesota Vikings.

==== 1997 season ====
In Week 2 of the 1997 season, Smith had 19 carries for 132 yards in a 25–22 overtime loss to the Arizona Cardinals. In the 1997 season, Smith rushed 261 times for 1,074 yards and four touchdowns to go with 40 receptions for 234 yards. The Cowboys finished with a 6–10 record and Barry Switzer resigned as head coach.

==== 1998 season ====
In Week 10, against the New York Giants, Smith had 29 carries for 163 yards in the 16–6 win. In the following game, against the Arizona Cardinals, he had 26 carries for 118 yards and three touchdowns. In Week 13, he had three rushing touchdowns in a 46–36 loss to the Vikings. In 1998, Smith became the Cowboys' all-time leading rusher (passing Dorsett) and the NFL's all-time rushing touchdown leader (surpassing Marcus Allen). The next year, he became the NFL's all-time leader in career postseason rushing yards (1,586) and postseason rushing touchdowns (19). He was named to the Pro Bowl for the seventh time. In the 1998 season, he finished with 319 carries for 1,332 yards and 13 rushing touchdowns to go with 27 receptions for 175 yards and two receiving touchdowns as the Cowboys went 10–6 and exited the playoffs in the Wild Card Round with a 20–7 loss to the Arizona Cardinals.

==== 1999 season ====
In Week 9 of the 1999 season, Smith had 13 carries for 140 yards and two touchdowns in the 27–17 loss. He had to leave the game with a broken hand. He had nine games going over 100 rushing yards in the 1999 season. He was named to the Pro Bowl for the eighth time in the 1999 season. In the 1999 season, Smith had 329 carries for 1,397 yards and 11 rushing touchdowns to go with 27 receptions for 119 yards and two touchdowns. The Cowboys went 8–8 and missed the postseason. The team fired Chan Gailey as head coach.

==== 2000 season ====
In Week 5 of the 2000 season, Smith had 24 carries for 132 yards and one touchdown in the 16–13 overtime win over the Carolina Panthers. In Week 10, he had 26 carries for 134 yards and a touchdown in the 16–13 loss in overtime to the Philadelphia Eagles. In Week 15, he had 23 carries for 150 yards and a touchdown in the 32–13 win over Washington. In the 2000 season, Smith had 294 carries for 1,203 yards and nine rushing touchdowns as the Cowboys went 5–11 and missed the postseason.

==== 2001 season ====
In the 2001 season, Smith had 261 carries for 1,021 yards and three touchdowns as the Cowboys went 5–11 and missed the postseason. He had four games on the season going over the 100-yard mark. He has inactive for two games as Dallas went 5–11 and missed the postseason. He became the first player in NFL history with 11 consecutive 1,000 yard seasons and the first to post eleven 1,000-yard rushing seasons in a career.

==== 2002 season ====
In 2002, Smith reached the goal he set as a rookie, finishing the season with 17,162 career yards and breaking the NFL rushing record previously held by Walter Payton against the Seattle Seahawks. He had 24 carries for 109 yards and a touchdown in a 17–14 loss to the Seahawks. In the same game against the Seahawks, he ran for a touchdown that gave him 150 career rushing touchdowns. In Week 13, against Washington, he had 23 carries for 144 yards in a 27–20 win. He finished the 2002 season with 254 carries for 975 rushing yards and five rushing touchdowns as the Cowboys went 5–11 and fired Dave Campo as head coach. After the season, the Cowboys hired head coach Bill Parcells who wanted to go with younger running backs and released Smith on February 26, 2003.

==== Cowboys records ====
With his historic professional football career, Smith is the Cowboys' franchise leader in rushing attempts, rushing yards, rushing touchdowns, and points scored. He has nearly double the next total of points scored as the next highest running back, Tony Dorsett.

=== Arizona Cardinals ===
On March 26, 2003, Smith signed a two-year contract as a free agent with the Arizona Cardinals, who were not only looking for Smith to improve their team, but also helped them promote it with their local fan base. Responding to questions about what he could do as a 34-year old running back, he said "I think I'm a 1,300-yard back, and I will be out to prove that." Head Coach Dave McGinnis announced that Smith would start for the Cardinals. On October 5, in a highly anticipated game, he returned to Texas Stadium to play against the Dallas Cowboys, but suffered a broken left shoulder blade after safety Roy Williams hit him in the second quarter. The Cardinals lost 24–7, and Smith's 6 carries for minus-1 yards marked the first time in his career he rushed for negative yardage. The injury forced him to miss six games, and he eventually finished the season with 90 carries for 256 rushing yards and averaged just 2.8 yards per carry.

In 2004, new head coach Dennis Green was hired and named Smith as the team's starter at running back. He posted 937 rushing yards and nine touchdowns. He became the oldest player in NFL history ever to throw his first touchdown pass, throwing a 21-yard touchdown strike on a halfback option play against the New Orleans Saints in week 4, the only passing attempt of his career.

Smith had 1,193 rushing yards, 11 rushing touchdowns, and averaged 3.2 yards per carry, and also had 212 receiving yards, no receiving touchdowns, and averaged 7.3 yards per reception during his two-year stint in Arizona.

Three days before Super Bowl XXXIX on February 3, 2005, Smith announced his retirement from the NFL. He was not re-signed by the Cardinals and signed a one-day contract for one dollar with the Dallas Cowboys, after which he immediately retired with the team he had played with for most of his career.

=== NFL records ===
Smith currently holds the NFL record in career rushing yards with 18,355, breaking the previous record held by Walter Payton, on October 27, 2002, against the Seattle Seahawks. He leads all running backs with 164 career rushing touchdowns, and his 175 total touchdowns ranks him second only to Jerry Rice's 208. The total of his rushing yards, receiving yards (3,224), and fumble return yards (−15) gives him a total of 21,564 yards from the line of scrimmage, making him one of only four players in NFL history to eclipse the 21,000 combined-yards mark. (The others are Jerry Rice, Brian Mitchell, and Walter Payton).

He is the NFL's all-time leader in rushing attempts with 4,409, the only player to post three seasons with 19 or more touchdowns, and the record-holder for most games in a season with a touchdown and most games in a season with a rushing touchdown (15), set in 1995.

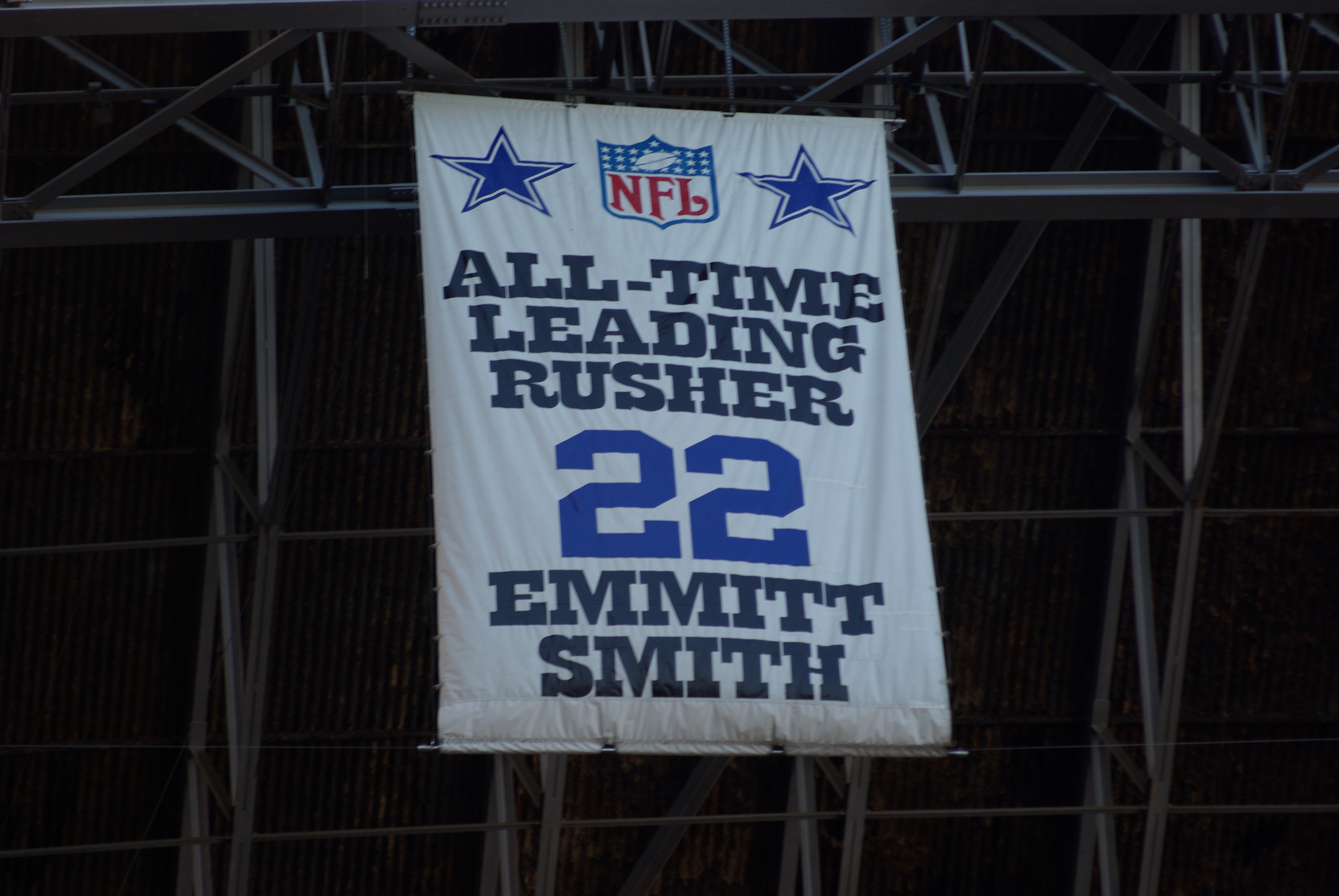
Fan banner honoring the NFL's all-time leading rusher banner at Texas Stadium.

Smith also accumulated several NFL postseason records, including rushing touchdowns (19), consecutive games with a rushing touchdown (9), and 100-yard rushing games (7). His 1,586 yards rushing is also top on the NFL postseason chart, and he shares the total playoff touchdown mark of 21 with Thurman Thomas. With the Cowboys, Smith won three Super Bowl rings and rushed for over 100 yards in two of those games, Super Bowl XXVII (108 yards and a touchdown, and six receptions for 27 yards), and Super Bowl XXVIII (132 yards and two touchdowns, and four receptions for 26 yards). Smith received the Super Bowl MVP award for Super Bowl XXVIII, becoming the only Cowboys running back ever to win the award. He also scored two touchdowns in Super Bowl XXX.

Smith is one of only five NFL players who have amassed over 10,000 career-rushing yards and 400 career receptions. Smith and Jerry Rice are the only two non-kickers in NFL history to score 1,000 points in a career.

=== Playing style ===
As a runner, Smith was consistently effective, though not dazzling in style. "(Smith) darted, slithered and followed his blockers, and squeezed yard after yard out of plays that didn't have any yards in them. He didn't look especially fast or powerful or blindingly deceptive, yet he couldn't be stopped." Smith was noted for being a very durable back with excellent vision, tremendous leg strength, and great balance, and was known as one of the best second-effort runners ever. Smith was also a reliable receiver and an excellent blocker in pass protection.

During his career, he was often compared to Detroit Lions Hall of Fame running back Barry Sanders, as both men were extremely successful for their respective teams and combined for eight rushing titles during the 1990s. Some give Smith the edge for his consistent "north-south" style that took full advantage of Dallas' talented offensive line, while some think Sanders' spectacular running style with sudden changes of direction made him a better back. Observers agree, though, that both Smith and Sanders were among the best running backs in league history.

Although Smith is the only player to tell John Madden that Madden NFL rated his skills too high, he was ranked No. 68 on The Sporting News' list of the 100 Greatest Football Players in 1999, three years before becoming the game's all-time rushing yards leader.

=== Legacy ===
Since retirement, Smith has been named to the Pro Football Hall of Fame first team All-1990s and the NFL 100 All Time team. His five total rushing touchdowns scored in Super Bowls remain the most by any player.

== NFL career statistics ==
Legend
	AP NFL MVP
	Won the Super Bowl
	NFL record
	Led the league
**Bold**	Career high

Year	Team	Games		Rushing							Receiving							Fumbles	
Year	Team	GP	GS	Att	Yds	Avg	Lng	TD	A/G	Y/G	Rec	Yds	Avg	Lng	TD	R/G	Y/G	Fum	Lost
1990	DAL	16	15	241	937	3.9	48	11	15.1	58.6	24	228	**9.5**	57	0	1.5	14.3	7	0
1991	DAL	16	16	365	1,563	4.3	**75**	12	22.8	97.7	49	258	5.3	14	1	3.1	16.1	**8**	0
1992	DAL	16	16	373	1,713	4.6	68	18	23.3	107.1	59	335	5.7	26	1	3.7	20.9	4	2
1993	DAL	14	13	283	1,486	**5.3**	62	9	20.2	106.1	57	**414**	7.3	**86**	1	**4.1**	**29.6**	4	1
1994	DAL	15	15	368	1,484	4.0	46	21	**24.5**	98.9	50	341	6.8	68	1	3.3	22.7	1	0
1995	DAL	16	16	**377**	**1,773**	4.7	60	**25**	23.6	**110.8**	**62**	375	6.0	40	0	3.9	23.4	7	**6**
1996	DAL	15	15	327	1,204	3.7	42	12	21.8	80.3	47	249	5.3	21	**3**	3.1	16.6	5	2
1997	DAL	16	16	261	1,074	4.1	44	4	16.3	67.1	40	234	5.9	24	0	2.5	14.6	1	1
1998	DAL	16	16	319	1,332	4.2	32	13	19.9	83.3	27	175	6.5	24	2	1.7	10.9	3	2
1999	DAL	15	15	329	1,397	4.2	63	11	21.9	93.1	27	119	4.4	14	2	1.8	7.9	5	3
2000	DAL	16	16	294	1,203	4.1	52	9	18.4	75.2	11	79	7.2	19	0	0.7	4.9	6	5
2001	DAL	14	14	261	1,021	3.9	44	3	18.6	72.9	17	116	6.8	22	0	1.2	8.3	1	1
2002	DAL	16	16	254	975	3.8	30	5	15.9	60.9	16	89	5.6	17	0	1.0	5.6	3	1
2003	ARI	10	5	90	256	2.8	22	2	9.0	25.6	14	107	7.6	36	0	1.4	10.7	2	0
2004	ARI	15	15	267	937	3.5	29	9	17.8	62.5	15	105	7.0	18	0	1.0	7.0	4	1
Career		226	219	4,409	18,355	4.2	75	164	19.5	81.2	515	3,224	6.3	86	11	2.3	14.3	61	25

== Life after football ==
In 2002, Smith and his wife founded the Pat & Emmitt Smith Charities as a 501(c)(3) nonprofit with the mission to "seek a reality where children have the resources necessary to realize their full potential."

In September 2005, Smith became a studio analyst on the NFL Network show, NFL Total Access.

On September 19, 2005, at halftime of the Cowboys-Redskins game (broadcast on Monday Night Football), Smith was inducted into the Dallas Cowboys Ring of Honor with his long-time teammates Troy Aikman and Michael Irvin.

On July 23, 2006, Smith was a judge at the Miss Universe 2006 pageant.

In the fall of 2006, Smith won the third season of Dancing with the Stars with professional dancer Cheryl Burke. Smith was praised for "making dancing look manly" and for his "natural charm," and Burke was given credit for coaching Smith while still allowing him to improvise some moves.

On March 12, 2007, Smith joined ESPN as a studio analyst for their NFL pre-game coverage alongside Chris Berman, Mike Ditka, Tom Jackson, and Chris Mortensen. However, he was removed from this coverage for the 2008 season. Instead, he appeared Sunday mornings during the NFL season on SportsCenter. He also appeared with Steve Young and Stuart Scott at the Monday Night Football site each week on Monday Night Countdown. His contract was not renewed for the 2009 season.

Smith was criticized by some in the media and sports blogs as being inarticulate. Jimmy Kimmel Live! created a video called "Emmitt Smith: Wordsmith" mocking his numerous malapropisms. Sports Illustrated's Peter King called Smith's comments regarding Michael Vick's involvement in the Bad Newz Kennels "idiotic and inappropriate."

Smith was elected to the Pro Football Hall of Fame in 2010, in his first year of eligibility.

On February 7, 2010, Smith flipped the coin at the start of Super Bowl XLIV between the Indianapolis Colts and New Orleans Saints.

In June 2010, Smith returned to his high school alma mater, Escambia High School (EHS) in Pensacola, Florida, for a taping of ESPN's show Homecoming with Rick Reilly. That October, he was inducted into the EHS Sports Hall of Fame during halftime of an EHS football game, along with baseball player Jim Presley and other school alumni.

In 2005, Smith made his first move toward becoming a real estate developer: He teamed with another Cowboy legend, Roger Staubach, the founder and CEO of Staubach Co., to form Smith/Cypress Partners LP, a real estate development enterprise specializing in transforming underutilized parcels in densely populated areas into commercially viable properties anchored by national retail giants.

In his first deal, Smith helped the firm sign Mervyn's, a California-based department store chain, to anchor a $45 million, 230,000-square-foot (21,000 m^{2}) project in Phoenix.

With access to $50 million in capital, Smith has several other projects in the works. He has a letter of intent to develop a 65-acre (260,000 m^{2}) site in a densely populated yet underserved area near northwest Fort Worth (it was formerly a college operated by a Masonic lodge), and he is currently negotiating for rights to another potential project in southeastern Fort Worth.

On one of the sites, Smith plans to build a complex with as much as 600,000 square feet (56,000 m^{2}) of retail space, more than double the size of the Phoenix property. "There's a huge need for top-quality retail in these areas, and I understand how the deals are cut," Smith said before lunch. "I'm not an engineer. I'm not a contractor. And I'm still learning the jargon. But I understand deals, and the only way to grow is to be in the middle of the deals."

Smith/Cypress is a joint venture (Smith owns 51 percent) with Cypress Equities, the retail development arm of Roger Staubach's real estate services company. Early in his own playing career, Smith approached the former Cowboy quarterback with an interest in learning more about real estate. Skeptical at first, Staubach told Smith to spend some time at his company's offices during the spring and summer if he was sincere. Smith did just that, spending the off-season at Staubach Co.'s headquarters in Dallas. Staubach founded the company in the late 1970s to locate and negotiate office and retail space for clients. In 2006, the privately held firm had transactions totaling $26 billion and 835 million square feet (77,600,000 m^{2}) of space.

In 2014, Smith's company began a nationwide expansion, including into New York City.

Smith also co-founded ESmith Legacy, a Baltimore-based company that specializes in commercial real estate development and investment management. He serves as its Chairman of the Board and chief executive officer (CEO).

In 2007, he was a guest on How I Met Your Mother, where he joked about the Super Bowl on this question asked by Barney Stinson "What is more important than the Super Bowl? – Dance, my friend, dance".

Smith participated in the 2011 National Heads-Up Poker Championship, defeating David Williams in the first round and losing in the second round to Andrew Robl.

He returned to Dancing with the Stars in its fifteenth season as one of the "All-Stars" contestants. Smith once again had Cheryl Burke as his professional dance partner. They were voted off during the ninth week of the competition.

In 2016, Smith took the position of co-owner alongside founder and president Ben Davis of The Gents Place, an ultra-premium men's grooming and lifestyle club founded in Frisco, Texas. The company has grown to include lifestyle clubs in Dallas and Southlake, as well as Leawood, Kansas.

In 2019, Smith appeared on an episode of Deal or No Deal to support a contestant who idolizes him.

In 2021, Smith teamed up with NASCAR driver Jesse Iwuji to form a NASCAR Xfinity Series team called Jesse Iwuji Motorsports that will compete full-time in 2022.

== Personal life ==
Smith was initiated as a member of the Phi Beta Sigma fraternity at the University of Florida. He returned to the university during the NFL offseason to complete his coursework, and graduated with his bachelor's degree in public recreation in 1996.

Smith is a devout Christian. He has a daughter, Rheagen Smith (born November 2, 1998), with ex-girlfriend Hope Wilson. He married former Miss Virginia USA Patricia Southall on April 22, 2000. They have three children together: Emmitt James Smith IV (born May 15, 2002), Skylar Smith (born October 15, 2003), and Elijah Alexander James Smith (born September 22, 2010). Smith is also the stepfather of Jasmine Page Lawrence (born January 15, 1996), who is Southall's daughter with ex-husband, actor-comedian Martin Lawrence.

His brother, Emory, played on the practice squads of the Cowboys and the Green Bay Packers. Smith's eldest son, E. J., played college football at Stanford and Texas A&M before signing with the Kansas City Chiefs.

== See also ==
- Emmitt Smith Football, a 1995 video game
- 1989 College Football All-America Team
- Florida Gators football, 1980–89
- List of College Football Hall of Fame inductees (players, A–K)
- List of College Football Hall of Fame inductees (players, L–Z)
- List of Dallas Cowboys first-round draft picks
- List of Dallas Cowboys players
- List of Florida Gators football All-Americans
- List of Florida Gators in the NFL draft
- List of Pro Football Hall of Fame inductees
- List of National Football League rushing yards leaders
- List of National Football League rushing champions
- List of SEC Most Valuable Players
- List of University of Florida alumni
- List of University of Florida Athletic Hall of Fame members
