= The Gents Place =

- Company type: Private
- Industry: Men's grooming
- Founded: Frisco, TX (2008)
- Founder: Benjamin Davis
- Headquarters: Dallas, TX
- Number of locations: 13
- Area served: USA
- Key people: Benjamin Davis (co-owner, president); Emmitt Smith (co-owner)
- Website: thegentsplace.com

The Gents Place is an ultra-premium and membership-based men's grooming and lifestyle club launched in Frisco, Texas, in 2008. The combination barbershop, spa and salon offers services including haircuts, coloring, shaves, hand and foot repairs and shoe shine services.

== History ==
The Gents Place was founded by Benjamin Davis in 2008, with the opening of the first location in the Dallas suburb of Frisco, Texas. Davis also founded GentsDeals.com, a men's buying club, and digital marketing company Male Advertising Network. Davis has stated that the idea for The Gents Place came to him because he disliked getting his hair cut and wanted to improve upon the experience. To start, he focused on building, training and retaining a staff with high standards, and used a social media campaign to sign up over 5,000 clients. In 2011, Davis purchased an existing men's salon in Leawood, Kansas, turning it into a second Gents Place location. A third location was opened in the Preston Hollow neighborhood of Dallas in 2012. By that time, men's grooming was the fastest growing segment of the beauty industry. As of July 2019, there are eight Texas locations, one in Kansas, one in Bentonville, two in Chicago, and one in Las Vegas.

In March 2016, The Gents Place received an undisclosed investment from Elevated Brands, a holding company established by San Antonio-based massage therapy company Massage Heights, to help expand The Gents Place to a nationwide franchise brand. As of July 2019, The Gents Place has 13 locations.

In May 2016, Hall of Fame NFL running back Emmitt Smith became co-owner of The Gents Place, alongside the company's founder and president, Ben Davis. Smith has been a member and has worked with the company since it was founded. After observing its potential to meet the growing need for men's luxury grooming, he decided to make an investment in the company, to assist with franchise growth and brand awareness. That month, Davis announced a national franchise program, with plans to open 150 franchise locations in the next five years, in addition to several more corporate-owned stores. In September 2016, The Gents Place announced that they would be expanding to Houston, developing up to 10 clubs in the area.

== Services and culture ==
The Gents Place provides hair services, hot towel shaves, waxing, shoe shines and hand and foot repairs, and features complimentary bars and cigar-smoking patios. Interior features include dark wood paneling, leather barber chairs, big lounge chairs and a red felt pool table in at least one of its locations. The atmosphere is comparable to a country club or high-end steakhouse. The company offers monthly and yearly memberships with various service packages. As of July 2016, The Gents Place has 2,300 members.

== Accolades ==
The Gents Place was named #1 Barber on the WFAA Dallas A-List in 2009. Haute Living called it one of the top five barbershops in Dallas, and it has been featured in Men's Health as one of the Manliest Barbershops in America. In 2014, Esquire magazine said it offers one of the most luxurious shaves in America. In December 2015, The Gents Place was named one of three winners of the OnDeck Barbara Corcoran Seal of Approval contest. The company received a $10,000 cash prize, and Davis met with Shark Tank investor Barbara Corcoran in New York.
