= Larry Pugh =

American football player (born 1943)

Profile
- Positions: Offensive guard Defensive tackle

Personal information
- Born: November 5, 1943 (age 83); New Castle, Pennsylvania

Career information
- College: Westminster College
- College Football Hall of Fame

Larry Pugh (born November 5, 1943) is an American former football player. He played offensive guard and defensive tackle for Westminster College. He was elected to the College Football Hall of Fame in South Bend, Indiana in 1998.

== College career ==
While at Westminster, he received All-American Honors on both sides of the field, and was considered one of the most sought after athletes of his time. Larry Pugh was a four-year starter, a three-year all-conference player, and two-year NAIA All-America for Westminster College located at New Wilmington, Pennsylvania. The NAIA named Pugh All-America at offensive guard in 1962, and at defensive tackle in 1964. (He was second team All-America at offensive guard in 1963.) In his years, 1961–64, Westminster won four championships in the West Penn Conference. The Saturday Evening Post named Pugh one of the top three linemen in the East. He was Westminster captain in 1964. In that year Westminster had an 8–0 record and held opponents to 129 yards a game on defense. This gave Westminster the third best ranking on defense among all small college teams. Larry Pugh entered the College Football Hall of Fame in 1998 with a strong class of professional athletes including Johnny Roland, Danny White, Randy Gradishar, Bo Jackson, Brad Budde and Pittsburgh Steeler Donnie Shell.

== Post–college ==
Larry Pugh was drafted by the Cleveland Browns, where he eventually suffered a career ending knee injury. He spent the rest of his career as a highly regarded educator and coach in the New Castle Area school system. He currently resides in New Castle.
