= Mads Thomsen =

Danish footballer (born 1989)

Personal information
- Full name: Mads H. Thomsen
- Date of birth: 15 March 1989 (age 37)
- Place of birth: Allerød, Denmark
- Position: Forward

Youth career
- Allerød FK
- 2002–200?: Lyngby BK

Senior career*
Years	Team	Apps	(Gls)
2006–2007	Lyngby BK	10	(2)
2008–2012	FC Nordsjælland	12	(0)
2012–2013	BSV	0	(0)

International career
2005	Denmark U-16	2	(0)
2005–2006	Denmark U-17	14	(8)
2006–2007	Denmark U-18	4	(0)
2007–2008	Denmark U-19	4	(0)
- * Club domestic league appearances and goals

Mads H. Thomsen (born 15 March 1989) is a Danish former professional football forward, who last played for BSV.
