= Ronnie Mallett =

American football player (born 1960)

Profile
- Position: Wide receiver

Personal information
- Born: January 20, 1960 (age 66); Pine Bluff, Arkansas, U.S.

Career information
- College: University of Central Arkansas
- College Football Hall of Fame

Ronnie Mallett (born January 20, 1960) is an American former football player and member of the College Football Hall of Fame.

Mallett was selected as an All-NAIA wide receiver during the 1979, 1980 and 1981 seasons. He was elected to the College Football Hall of Fame in 2006, the only player from the University of Central Arkansas to be so honored.
