= Calvin Roberts (American football) =

American football player (1927–1966)

Profile
- Positions: Offensive tackle, defensive tackle

Personal information
- Born: April 25, 1927; Hector, Minnesota
- Died: March 3, 1966 (aged 38)

Career information
- College: Gustavus Adolphus College
- College Football Hall of Fame

Calvin Roberts (April 25, 1927 – March 3, 1966) was an American football tackle. He played college football for Gustavus Adolphus College. He was elected to the College Football Hall of Fame in 2003.
