= Lynn Thomsen =

American football player (born 1964)

Profile
- Position: Defensive tackle

Personal information
- Born: September 12, 1964 (age 62); Sioux City, Iowa

Career information
- College: Augustana College
- College Football Hall of Fame

Lynn Thomsen (born September 12, 1964) is an American former football player. He was elected to the College Football Hall of Fame in 1997.
