= 1889 college football season =

American college football season

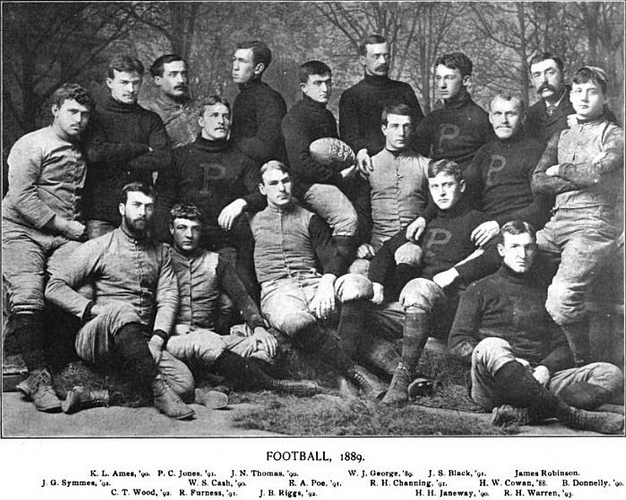
- 1889 Princeton Tigers
- Total No. of teams: 21
- Regular season: September 28 to December 2
- Champion: Princeton

The 1889 college football season was the season of American football played among colleges and universities in the United States during the 1889–90 academic year.

The 1889 Princeton Tigers football team, led by team captain Edgar Allan Poe, compiled a perfect 10–0 record and was recognized as the national champion by the Billingsley Report, Helms Athletic Foundation, Houlgate System, National Championship Foundation, and Parke H. Davis.

In the South, Wofford defeated Furman in the first intercollegiate game played in the state of South Carolina. The game featured no uniforms, no positions, and the rules were formulated before the game.

As the popularity of the program increased, new football programs were established in 1889 at Iowa, Syracuse, and Washington.

All eleven players selected by Caspar Whitney for the first All-America college football team came from the Big Three (Princeton, Yale, and Harvard). Four of the honorees have been inducted into the College Football Hall of Fame: fullback Knowlton Ames (Princeton), end Amos Alonzo Stagg (Yale), tackle Hector Cowan (Princeton), and guard Pudge Heffelfinger (Yale).

== Conference and program changes ==
- The Western Interstate University Football Association began its first season of play.

School	1888 Conference	1889 Conference
Delaware	Program established	Independent
Iowa Hawkeyes	Program established	Independent
Washington	Program established	Independent

== Awards and honors ==
=== All-Americans ===
The consensus All-America team included:

Position	Name	Height	Weight (lbs.)	Class	Hometown	Team
QB	Edgar Allan Poe			Jr.	Baltimore, Maryland	Princeton
HB	Roscoe Channing		141	Sr.	New York, New York	Princeton
HB	James P. Lee			Jr.	New York, New York	Harvard
FB	Snake Ames	5'10"	157	Sr.	Chicago, Illinois	Princeton
E	Amos Alonzo Stagg			Sr.	West Orange, New Jersey	Yale
T	Hector Cowan			Sr.	Hobart, New York	Princeton
G	Pudge Heffelfinger	6'4"	178	So.	Minneapolis, Minnesota	Yale
C	William George			Sr.		Princeton
G	John Cranston			Jr.	Sheridan, New York	Harvard
T	Charles O. Gill			Sr.	Walpole, Massachusetts	Yale
E	Arthur Cumnock			Jr.	Danielson, Connecticut	Harvard

=== Statistical leaders ===
- Player scoring most points: Bum McClung, Yale, 176

== Conference standings ==
The following is a potentially incomplete list of conference standings:

1889 Eastern Intercollegiate Football Association standings
	Conf.					Overall
Team	W		L		T	W		L		T
Dartmouth $	4	–	0	–	0	7	–	1	–	0
MIT	2	–	2	–	0	3	–	3	–	0
Williams	1	–	1	–	1	4	–	5	–	1
Amherst	1	–	2	–	1	3	–	5	–	2
Stevens	0	–	3	–	0	1	–	10	–	0
$ – Conference champion

=== Independents ===
1889 Eastern college football independents records
	Conf.			Overall
Team	W	L	T	W		L		T
Princeton		–		10	–	0	–	0
Massachusetts		–		2	–	0	–	0
Yale		–		15	–	1	–	0
Harvard		–		9	–	2	–	0
Franklin & Marshall		–		5	–	1	–	1
Dickinson		–		4	–	1	–	1
Navy		–		4	–	1	–	1
Tufts		–		3	–	1	–	0
Lehigh		–		8	–	3	–	2
Cornell		–		8	–	4	–	0
Penn		–		7	–	6	–	0
Brown		–		2	–	2	–	0
Penn State		–		2	–	2	–	0
Wesleyan		–		5	–	7	–	1
Bucknell		–		2	–	3	–	1
Lafayette		–		3	–	4	–	2
Columbia		–		2	–	7	–	2
Fordham		–		1	–	3	–	0
Rutgers		–		1	–	4	–	0
NYU		–		0	–	2	–	0

1889 Midwestern college football independents records
	Conf.			Overall
Team	W	L	T	W		L		T
Miami (OH)		–		4	–	0	–	0
Butler		–		2	–	0	–	0
Washington University		–		2	–	0	–	0
Iowa College		–		1	–	0	–	0
Lake Forest		–		1	–	0	–	0
Notre Dame		–		1	–	0	–	0
South Dakota		–		1	–	0	–	1
Minnesota		–		3	–	1	–	0
Purdue		–		2	–	1	–	0
South Dakota Agricultural		–		0	–	0	–	1
Northwestern		–		2	–	2	–	0
Cincinnati		–		1	–	1	–	0
Wabash		–		1	–	1	–	0
Michigan		–		1	–	2	–	0
Indiana		–		0	–	1	–	1
Iowa		–		0	–	1	–	0
Wisconsin		–		0	–	2	–	0

1889 Southern college football independents records
	Conf.			Overall
Team	W	L	T	W		L		T
Trinity (NC)		–		2	–	0	–	0
Georgetown		–		5	–	1	–	0
Navy		–		4	–	1	–	1
Virginia		–		4	–	2	–	0
Wake Forest		–		2	–	2	–	0
North Carolina		–		1	–	1	–	0
Delaware		–		1	–	1	–	1
Johns Hopkins		–		2	–	4	–	1
Richmond		–		1	–	2	–	0
Dover Conference Academy		–		0	–	2	–	1
Furman		–		0	–	2	–	0

1889 Far West college football independents records
	Conf.			Overall
Team	W	L	T	W		L		T
USC		–		2	–	0	–	0
California		–		0	–	0	–	0
Washington		–		0	–	1	–	0
