= 1889 Harvard Crimson football team =

American college football season

1889 Harvard Crimson football
- Conference: Independent
- Record: 9–2
- Head coach: None
- Captain: Arthur Cumnock
- Home stadium: Jarvis Field

1889 Eastern college football independents records
	Conf.			Overall
Team	W	L	T	W		L		T
Princeton		–		10	–	0	–	0
Massachusetts		–		2	–	0	–	0
Yale		–		15	–	1	–	0
Harvard		–		9	–	2	–	0
Franklin & Marshall		–		5	–	1	–	1
Dickinson		–		4	–	1	–	1
Navy		–		4	–	1	–	1
Tufts		–		3	–	1	–	0
Lehigh		–		8	–	3	–	2
Cornell		–		8	–	4	–	0
Penn		–		7	–	6	–	0
Brown		–		2	–	2	–	0
Penn State		–		2	–	2	–	0
Wesleyan		–		5	–	7	–	1
Bucknell		–		2	–	3	–	1
Lafayette		–		3	–	4	–	2
Columbia		–		2	–	7	–	2
Fordham		–		1	–	3	–	0
Rutgers		–		1	–	4	–	0
NYU		–		0	–	2	–	0

The 1889 Harvard Crimson football team represented Harvard University in the 1889 college football season. The Crimson finished with a 9–2 record. The team won its first ten games by a combined score of 404–6, but lost its last two games, against Princeton and Yale, giving up 41 points against Princeton.

Three Harvard players were selected as first-team players on the 1889 All-America college football team: end and team Arthur Cumnock, halfback James P. Lee, and guard John Cranston.

== Schedule ==
Date	Time	Opponent	Site	Result	Attendance	Source
October 2		Phillips Exeter	Jarvis Field; Cambridge, MA	W 28–0		
October 5		Stevens	Jarvis Field; Cambridge, MA	W 28–4		
October 12		Dartmouth	Jarvis Field; Cambridge, MA (rivalry	W 38–0		
October 16	4:00 p.m.	Boston Tech	Jarvis Field; Cambridge, MA	W 62–0		
October 19		Williams	Jarvis Field; Cambridge, MA	W 41–0		
October 23		Phillips Academy	Cambridge, MA	W 41–0		
October 26	3:15 p.m.	Wesleyan	Jarvis Field; Cambridge, MA	W 64–0		
November 2		Penn	Jarvis Field; Cambridge, MA	W 35–0	2,000	
November 9		vs. Wesleyan	Hampden Park; Springfield, MA	W 67–2		
November 16	2:45 p.m.	Princeton	Jarvis Field; Cambridge, MA (rivalry)	L 15–41	10,000	
November 23	2:00 p.m.	vs. Yale	Hampden Park; Springfield, MA (rivalry)	L 0–6	15,000	

== Roster ==
- Blanchard
- Bowman
- Campbell
- John Cranston
- Crosby
- Arthur Cumnock
- Curtis
- Dudley Dean
- John A. Denison
- Fearing
- Goldwaithe
- Frank Hallowell
- Hutchinson
- Johnson
- James P. Lee
- Morse
- Marshall Newell
- James Alfred Saxe
- Hiland Orlando Stickney
- Tilton
- Bernard Trafford
- P. Trafford
- Joshua Damon Upton
