= List of The Dickey Club members =

Harvard University student group members

The Dickey Club, was a private social club at Harvard University, originally founded in 1851 as a chapter of the Delta Kappa Epsilon fraternity. Following are some of the notable members of The Dickey Club.

== Academia ==
- James Barr Ames – 2nd Dean of Harvard Law School
- Wilder Dwight Bancroft – chemistry professor at Cornell University
- Arthur Pierce Butler – co-founder and headmaster of Morristown School
- Archibald Cary Coolidge – first director of the Harvard University Library from 1910 to 1928
- Charles Loring Jackson – organic chemist, professor, and chairman of the Division of Chemistry at Harvard University
- Edwin P. Seaver – superintendent of Boston Public Schools
- William Codman Sturgis – mycologist and dean of the School of Forestry at Colorado College
- Ezra Ripley Thayer – Dean of Harvard Law School
- Barrett Wendell – professor of English at Harvard University, known for writing a series of textbooks
- Justin Winsor – librarian, historian, first president of the American Library Association
- Francis Woodman – co-founder and headmaster of Morristown School

== Architecture ==
- Walter Cook – architect with Babb, Cook & Willard
- Charles Allerton Coolidge – architect
- Bowdoin B. Crowninshield – naval architect who specialized in racing yachts
- William Winthrop Kent – architect
- Guy Lowell – architect and landscape architect
- Henry Chapman Mercer – tilemaker and designer of Fonthill, the Moravian Pottery and Tile Works and the Mercer Museum; curator of American and prehistoric archaeology of the University of Pennsylvania Museum
- J. Harleston Parker – architect with Parker, Thomas & Rice
- Robert Swain Peabody – architect
- J. Pickering Putnam – architect
- Arthur Rotch – architect
- Isaac Newton Phelps Stokes – architect
- Richard Clipston Sturgis – architect
- Edmund M. Wheelwright – architect
- James Bosley Noel Wyatt – architect

== Art ==
- Francis Brooks Chadwick – painter
- Frederick Converse – composer of classical musict
- Frederic Crowninshield – painter
- Ralph Wormeley Curtis – painter and graphic artist
- Augustus C. Gurnee – socialite and art patron
- Edward Simmons – painter
- William A. Slater – art collector who established the Slater Memorial Museum
- Edward Perry Warren – art collector
- Charles Goddard Weld – art collector who made major contributions to Museum of Fine Arts, Boston and the Peabody Essex Museum

== Business ==
- Rodolphe L. Agassiz – polo player and chairman of the board of the Calumet and Hecla Mining Company
- Frederick Lothrop Ames – co-founder of General Electric, vice president of the Old Colony Railroad, and director of the Union Pacific Railroad
- William Henry Baldwin Jr. – president of the Long Island Rail Road
- August Belmont Jr. – finacier and head of the Interborough Rapid Transit Company
- James Cunningham Bishop – banker and officer of the Welsbach Street Illuminating Company
- James A. Burden Jr. – industrialist
- Frederic Adrian Delano – first vice chairman of the Federal Reserve and president of the Wheeling and Lake Erie Railroad, the Wabash Pittsburgh Terminal Railway, and the Wabash Railroad
- Amos Tuck French – member of the New York Stock Exchange and vice-president of the Manhattan Trust Company
- William A. Gaston – president of the Boston Elevated Railway and National Shawmut Bank
- Powers Hapgood – trade union organizer and Socialist Party leader
- George Ward Holdrege – general manager Burlington and Missouri River Railroad Company
- Thomas W. Lamont – vice president of First National Bank
- George H. Mifflin – president of Houghton Mifflin
- J. P. Morgan Jr. – banker and finance executive
- Henry T. Oxnard – founder and president of the American Beet Sugar Company
- Bradley Palmer – lawyer involved with the creation of Gillette Safety Razor Co., the International Telephone & Telegraph Corporation, and the United Fruit Company
- Frederick H. Rindge – real estate developer and founder of present-day Malibu, California
- Charles Robert Sanger – professor of chemistry at Harvard University
- George R. Sheldon – banker, finacier, and a leading force in the Trust Company of America
- George Fox Steedman – president of Curtis Manufacturing Co.
- James J. Storrow – partner of Lee, Higginson & Co.; president of General Motors Nash Motors; president of the Boy Scouts of America
- Hamilton McKown Twombly – co-founder of the American Sulphur Company, later the Union Sulphur Company; financial advisor to William Henry Vanderbilt
- Henry K. Vingut – horse broker
- August H. Vogel – vice-president of Pfister & Vogel
- Fiske Warren – president of the S. D. Warren Paper Co., developer of single-tax colonies, activist for Philippine independence, and tennis champion
- Grinnell Willis – textile merchant
- Robert Winsor – head of Kidder, Peabody & Company

== Law ==
- Brooks Adams – lawyer, political scientist, and critic of capitalism
- Francis R. Appleton – lawyer with Robbins & Appleton
- Peter Townsend Barlow – New York City magistrate
- Edmund L. Baylies – lawyer; personal counsel to Cornelius Vanderbilt III; president of the Vanderbilt Hotel Corporation
- Julian Codman – lawyer who was active with the Anti-Imperialist League
- Harold Jefferson Coolidge Sr. – lawyer
- James Truesdell Kilbreth – lawyer, New York City Police justice, Court of Special Sessions justice, and Collector of the Port of New York
- William Loring – justice of the Massachusetts Supreme Judicial Court
- James Arnold Lowell – judge of the United States District Court for the District of Massachusetts
- John James McCook – corporate lawyer
- Peter B. Olney – New York County District Attorney, Referee in Bankruptcy, and attorney
- Francis Key Pendleton – justice of the Supreme Court of New York and Corporation Counsel of New York City
- William Lowell Putnam – lawyer
- Samuel D. Warren II – lawyer and co-founder of Nutter McClennen & Fish
- Francis Joseph Wing – Judge of the United States District Court for the Northern District of Ohio

== Literature and journalism ==
- John Jay Chapman – writer, poet, and essayist
- Julian Hawthorne – writer and journalist
- William Randolph Hearst – newspaper publisher and United States House of Representatives
- Robert Herrick – novelist
- Edward Knoblock – playwright and novelist
- Edward Jackson Lowell – author of historical nonfiction and lawyer
- Edward Sandford Martin – chief editorial editor and literary editor of Life Magaziner
- William H. Peck – writer
- Henry Dwight Sedgwick – author
- Frank Preston Stearns – biographer
- William Roscoe Thayer – author and editor
- Bayard Tuckerman – biographer and historian
- Owen Wister – writer, known for The Virginian

== Medicine ==
- John Templeton Bowen – dermatologist and professor of dermatology at Massachusetts General Hospital
- William A. Brooks – surgeon and academic
- Arthur Tracy Cabot – surgeon at the Massachusetts General Hospital; curator of the Harvard Dental Museum
- James Read Chadwick – gynecologist and medical librarian
- Ernest Amory Codman – surgeon
- John Green Curtis – physiologist with the Columbia University College of Physicians and Surgeons
- Thomas Dwight – physician, anatomist, and professor of anatomy at Harvard Medical
- Robert B. Greenough – leading American cancer specialist
- Robert Means Lawrence – physician at the Boston Dispensary and author
- Charles McBurney – surgeon-in-chief of the Roosevelt Hospital (now Mount Sinai West)
- George Howard Monks – surgeon and academic known for inventing board games such as Chinese checkers, Basilinda, and Halma
- E. H. Nichols – surgeon and clinical professor of surgery at Harvard Medical School
- Morton Prince – physician who specialized in neurology and abnormal psychology
- Thomas Morgan Rotch – pediatric doctor, first full professor of pediatrics in the United States

== Military ==
- Winthrop Astor Chanler – member of the Rough Riders in the Spanish–American War
- Martin Witherspoon Gary – brigadier general in the Confederate States Army and South Carolina Senate
- James R. Soley – Assistant Secretary of the Navy; head of the Office of Naval Records and Library; instructor at the United States Naval War College; head of the Department of English Studies, History, and Law at the United States Naval Academy
- Gordon Woodbury – Assistant Secretary of the Navy

== Politics ==
- Charles Francis Adams III – United States Secretary of the Navy and Mayor of Quincy
- Frederick Hobbes Allen – Mayor of Pelham Manor, New York; member of the Democratic National Finance Committee; member of Woodrow Wilson's Peace Commission
- Frederick Lothrop Ames – Massachusetts Senate
- Larz Anderson – United States Ambassador to Japan; United States Minister to Belgium
- Robert Bacon – United States Secretary of State and United States Ambassador to France
- William Bancroft – Massachusetts House of Representatives and Mayor of Cambridge, Massachusetts
- Franklin Bartlett – United States House of Representatives
- Isaac Bell Jr. – United States Ambassador to the Netherlands; cotton broker and investors in the Commercial Cable Company
- Perry Belmont – United States House of Representatives; United States Envoy Extraordinary and Minister Plenipotentiary to Spain
- Franklin S. Billings – Governor of Vermont, Lieutenant Governor of Vermont, and Speaker of the Vermont House of Representatives
- Charles Sumner Bird – Progressive Party's candidate in the 1912 and 1913 Massachusetts gubernatorial elections
- Nathaniel B. Borden – United States House of Representatives, Massachusetts Senate, and Massachusetts House of Representatives
- Lathrop Brown – United States House of Representatives
- Melville Bull – United States House of Representatives
- Edward Burnett – United States House of Representatives
- William A. Chanler – United States House of Representatives and New York State Assembly
- John Gardner Coolidge – United States Minister to Nicaragua
- John Sergeant Cram – president of the New York Public Service Commission; President of the Dock Board
- Grafton D. Cushing – Lieutenant Governor of Massachusetts and speaker of the Massachusetts House of Representatives
- Dwight F. Davis – Governor-General of the Philippines and United States Assistant Secretary of War
- Charles S. Fairchild – United States Secretary of the Treasury and Attorney General of New York
- William Cameron Forbes – Governor General of the Philippines and United States Ambassador to Japan
- George H. Forster – New York State Assembly and New York State Senate
- Louis A. Frothingham – United States House of Representatives, Lieutenant Governor of Massachusetts
- Augustus P. Gardner – United States House of Representatives and Massachusetts Senate
- F. Norton Goddard – political activist, founder of the Civic Club and the Anti-Policy Society
- Edward D. Hayden – United States House of Representatives and Massachusetts House of Representatives
- Archibald M. Howe – member of the Common Council in Cambridge, Massachusetts; private secretary to congressman Henry Lillie Pierce; National Party vice-presidential candidate
- Joseph P. Kennedy Sr. – U.S. Ambassador to the United Kingdom and 1st Chair of the United States Maritime Commission
- Henry W. Keyes – Governor of New Hampshire, United States Senate, New Hampshire Senate, and New Hampshire House of Representatives.
- Everett J. Lake – Governor of Connecticut, Lieutenant Governor of Connecticut, Connecticut Senate, Connecticut House of Representatives
- John E. Leonard – United States House of Representatives and associate justice of the Louisiana Supreme Court
- Robert Todd Lincoln – United States Secretary of War and Minister to the United Kingdom
- Henry Cabot Lodge – United States Senate and United States House of Representatives
- John D. Long – United States Secretary of the Navy, Governor of Massachusetts, and United States House of Representatives
- Nicholas Longworth – Speaker of the United States House of Representatives
- George H. Lyman – Collector of Customs for the Port of Boston and chairman of the Massachusetts Republican Party
- Charles MacVeagh – United States Ambassador to Japan
- George Von L. Meyer – United States Secretary of the Navy, United States Postmaster General, U.S. ambassidor to Russia, United States Ambassidor to Italy, and Speaker of the Massachusetts House of Representatives
- Thomas Mott Osborne – mayor of Auburn, New York; New York Public Service Commission; Warden of Sing Sing; commander of Portsmouth Naval Prison
- Thomas Nelson Perkins – member of the Paris Peace Conference and the Allied Reparations Committee
- Regis Henri Post – Governor of Puerto Rico and member of the New York State Assembly
- Franklin D. Roosevelt – President of the United States
- Theodore Roosevelt – President of the United States
- Theodore Roosevelt Jr. – Governor-General of the Philippines, Governor of Puerto Rico, Assistant Secretary of the Navy, and New York State Assembly
- William E. Russell – Governor of Massachusetts
- Leverett Saltonstall – United States Senate and Governor of Massachusetts
- John Simpkins – United States House of Representatives
- Charles F. Sprague – United States House of Representatives, Massachusetts Senate, Massachusetts House of Representatives
- Thomas Chandler Thacher – United States House of Representatives
- Charles W. Upham – United States House of Representatives, Massachusetts House of Representatives, and mayor of Salem, Massachusetts
- Charles G. Washburn – United States House of Representatives, Massachusetts Senate, Massachusetts House of Representatives
- John D. Washburn – Envoy Extraordinary and Minister Plenipotentiary to Switzerland
- George S. Weed – New York State Assembly
- Samuel Winslow – United States House of Representatives

== Religion ==
- Robert Codman – bishop of the Episcopal Diocese of Maine
- Samuel A. Eliot – Unitarian minister and secretary of the American Unitarian Association
- Francis Greenwood Peabody – Unitarian minister and theology professor at Harvard University

== Science ==
- Outram Bangs – zoologist and urator of mammals at the Museum of Comparative Zoology
- Walter Deane – botanist, ornithologist, and curator of William Brewster's ornithological museum
- Lucius Lee Hubbard – State Geologist of Michigan
- Percival Lowell – mathematician and astronomer who founded the Lowell Observatory
- Clarence Bloomfield Moore – archaeologist
- John Thayer – amateur ornithologist

== Sports ==
- George C. Adams – head coach of the Harvard University football program
- Rodolphe L. Agassiz – polo player and president of Calumet and Hecla Consolidated Copper Company
- Bill Annan – professional baseball player and umpire
- Raymond Rodgers Belmont – polo player
- Bernard Trafford – Harvard Crimson football player who led the nation in scoring
- Seward Cary – polo player
- Samuel T. Chase – tennis player
- John Elliot Cowdin – polo player
- Joshua Crane – four time U.S. court tennis champion; played in the finals of the 1904 U.S. Open Polo Championship
- Francis Boardman Crowninshield – yachtsman
- Arthur Cumnock – college football player selected for the first All-America team in 1889
- George R. Fearing – national champion in real tennis and rackets; men's high jump indoor world record from 1891 to 1893
- Frank Hallowell – All-American college football player and coach
- Woodbury Kane – yachtsman; served on the Columbia in the 1899 America's Cup race
- Foxhall P. Keene – gold medalist in Polo at the 1900 Summer Olympics; semifinalist at the 1883 U.S. National Championships for tennis
- James P. Lee – college football player on the 1889 All-America college football team
- Herbert Leeds – amateur golfer, competitive yachtsman, and golf course architect
- Gerrit Smith Miller – founder of Oneida Football Club, known as "the father of football in the United States"; member of the New York State Assembly
- George B. Morison – sportsman, president of the Boston Athletic Association
- Marshall Newell – college football player and coach
- Sumner Paine – shooter who won a gold and silver medal in the 1896 Summer Olympics
- Herbert M. Sears – yachtsman, commodore of the Eastern Yacht Club, owner of Constellation
- Richard Sears – tennis player, seven-time winner of the US National Championships singles
- Quincy Shaw – tennis player, winner of the NCAA Men's Tennis Championships in 1887 and 1890
- Howard Taylor – tennis player, NCAA singles and doubles champion in 1883, winner of the 1889 U.S. National Championships men's doubles
- Fred Thayer – baseball manager who invented the catcher's mask
- Joshua Damon Upton – head football coach at Tufts University
- Walter Van Rensselaer Berry – tennis player and judge at the International Mixed Tribunal of Cairo, Egypt
