= 1889 Princeton Tigers football team =

American college football season

1889 Princeton Tigers football
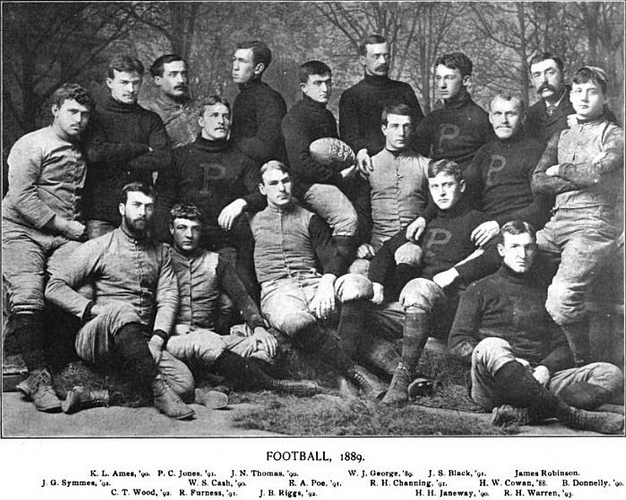

National champion
- Conference: Independent
- Record: 10–0
- Head coach: None
- Captain: Edgar Allan Poe

1889 Eastern college football independents records
	Conf.			Overall
Team	W	L	T	W		L		T
Princeton		–		10	–	0	–	0
Massachusetts		–		2	–	0	–	0
Yale		–		15	–	1	–	0
Harvard		–		9	–	2	–	0
Franklin & Marshall		–		5	–	1	–	1
Dickinson		–		4	–	1	–	1
Navy		–		4	–	1	–	1
Tufts		–		3	–	1	–	0
Lehigh		–		8	–	3	–	2
Cornell		–		8	–	4	–	0
Penn		–		7	–	6	–	0
Brown		–		2	–	2	–	0
Penn State		–		2	–	2	–	0
Wesleyan		–		5	–	7	–	1
Bucknell		–		2	–	3	–	1
Lafayette		–		3	–	4	–	2
Columbia		–		2	–	7	–	2
Fordham		–		1	–	3	–	0
Rutgers		–		1	–	4	–	0
NYU		–		0	–	2	–	0

The 1889 Princeton Tigers football team was an American football team that represented Princeton University as an independent during the 1889 college football season. The team compiled a perfect 10–0 record, shut out six of ten opponents, and outscored all opponents by a total of 484 to 29. The team captain and quarterback was Edgar Allan Poe, the second cousin of his namesake, the writer Edgar Allan Poe.

There was no contemporaneous system in 1889 for determining a national champion. However, Princeton was retroactively named as the national champion by the Billingsley Report, Helms Athletic Foundation, Houlgate System, National Championship Foundation, and Parke H. Davis. It was Princeton's 15th national championship.

Five players from the 1889 Princeton team were selected by Caspar Whitney for the first All-America college football team: quarterback Edgar Allan Poe; halfback Roscoe Channing; fullback Knowlton "Snake" Ames; tackle Hector Cowan; and center William George. Three more Princeton players—guard Hugh Janeway, end Ben "Sport" Donnelly, and halfback J. S. Black—were among Whitney's eight "substitute" selections. Ames and Cowan were later inducted into the College Football Hall of Fame.

== Schedule ==
Date	Time	Opponent	Site	Result	Attendance	Source
October 5	2:40 p.m.	Lehigh	Princeton, NJ	W 16–0		
October 10		at Lehigh	Bethlehem, PA	W 16–4		
October 19	2:40 p.m.	Stevens	Princeton, NJ	W 49–0	1,000	
October 26	3:05 p.m.	at Penn	University Athletic Grounds; Philadelphia, PA (rivalry)	W 72–4	1,200	
November 2	3:00 p.m.	vs. Wesleyan	Berkeley Oval; New York, NY	W 98–0	Several hundred	
November 5	3:00 p.m.	at Columbia	Berkeley Oval; New York, NY	W 71–0		
November 16	2:45 p.m.	at Harvard	Jarvis Field; Cambridge, MA (rivalry)	W 41–15		
November 23		Orange Athletic Club	Princeton, NJ	W 54–6		
November 28	2:30 p.m.	vs. Yale	Berkley Oval; New York, NY (rivalry)	W 10–0	>25,000	
December 7	3:30 p.m.	vs. Washington, DC (Note: An ad-hoc team "picked from the best players of the District".)	Capitol Park; Washington, DC	W 57–0	2,500	

== Roster ==
- Knowlton Ames, HB
- Beach, HB
- J. S. Black, HB
- Brown, G
- Casement, T
- W. S. Cash, T
- Roscoe Channing, HB
- Hector Cowan, T
- Ben "Sport" Donnelly, E
- R. Furness, E
- William George
- Hale, T
- Sheppard Homans Jr., HB
- Hugh Janeway, G
- P. C. Jones
- Lewis, FB
- Lilly, QB
- Edgar Allan Poe, QB
- Jesse Riggs, G
- James Robinson
- J. G. Symmes, C
- J. N. Thomas, C
- Wagenhurst, T
- Ralph Warren, E
- Clinton Wood, T
