= 1889 Yale Bulldogs football team =

American college football season

1889 Yale Bulldogs football
- Conference: Independent
- Record: 15–1
- Head coach: Walter Camp (2nd season)
- Captain: Charles O. Gill
- Home stadium: Yale Field

1889 Eastern college football independents records
	Conf.			Overall
Team	W	L	T	W		L		T
Princeton		–		10	–	0	–	0
Massachusetts		–		2	–	0	–	0
Yale		–		15	–	1	–	0
Harvard		–		9	–	2	–	0
Franklin & Marshall		–		5	–	1	–	1
Dickinson		–		4	–	1	–	1
Navy		–		4	–	1	–	1
Tufts		–		3	–	1	–	0
Lehigh		–		8	–	3	–	2
Cornell		–		8	–	4	–	0
Penn		–		7	–	6	–	0
Brown		–		2	–	2	–	0
Penn State		–		2	–	2	–	0
Wesleyan		–		5	–	7	–	1
Bucknell		–		2	–	3	–	1
Lafayette		–		3	–	4	–	2
Columbia		–		2	–	7	–	2
Fordham		–		1	–	3	–	0
Rutgers		–		1	–	4	–	0
NYU		–		0	–	2	–	0

The 1889 Yale Bulldogs football team represented Yale University in the 1889 college football season. In their second season under head coach Walter Camp, Yale compiled a 15–1 record, held opponents scoreless in 12 games, and outscored all opponents by a total of 659 to 31. Its only loss was in the final game of the season against rival Princeton by a 10–0 score.

Three Yale players (end Amos Alonzo Stagg, guard Pudge Heffelfinger and tackle Charles O. Gill) were named to the 1889 All-America college football team, the first All-America college football team as selected by Caspar Whitney. Stagg and Heffelfinger have also been inducted into the College Football Hall of Fame.

== Schedule ==
Date	Time	Opponent	Site	Result	Attendance	Source
September 28	3:00 p.m.	Wesleyan	Yale Field; New Haven, CT	W 38–0		
October 9		at Wesleyan	Middletown, CT	W 63–5		
October 12		Williams	Yale Field; New Haven, CT	W 36–0		
October 16		Cornell	Yale Field; New Haven, CT	W 56–6		
October 19		Amherst	Yale Field; New Haven, CT	W 42–0		
October 24		at Trinity (CT)	Hartford, CT	W 64–0		
October 26		at Columbia	Berkeley Oval; New York, NY	W 62–0	600	
October 30	3:15 p.m. or 3:17 p.m.	at Penn	University Athletic Grounds; Philadelphia, PA	W 20–10	2,000	
October 31		vs. Stevens	Berkeley Oval; New York, NY	W 30–0		
November 5		at Crescent Athletic Club	Washington Park; Brooklyn, NY	W 18–0	4,000	
November 9		at Cornell	Ithaca, NY	W 70–0	2,000	
November 12	3:15 p.m.	at Amherst	Blake Field; Amherst, MA	W 32–0		
November 13		at Williams	Weston Field; Williamstown, MA	W 70–0		
November 16		vs. Wesleyan	Hampden Park; Springfield, MA	W 52–0		
November 23	2:00 p.m.	vs. Harvard	Hampden Park; Springfield, MA (rivalry)	W 6–0	15,000	
November 28	2:29 p.m.	vs. Princeton	Berkley Oval; New York, NY (rivalry)	L 0–10	>25,000	

== Roster ==
- William Adams, T
- Harry Beecher, QB
- C. D. Bliss, HB
- William Herbert Corbin, C
- Harry T. Ferris, C
- Charles O. Gill, T
- Andrew Graves, FB
- Bert Hanson, T
- John A. Hartwell, E
- Pudge Heffelfinger, G
- Lawrence Heyworth, G
- Herbert McBride, FB
- Lee McClung, HB
- B. Morrison, HB
- Stanley Morrison, HB
- Wallace Moyle, E
- Ashbel Barney Newell, C
- William Rhodes, T
- Amos Alonzo Stagg, E
- Terry, HB
- John B. Townsend, E
- Henry L. Williams, HB
- William Wurtenburg, QB
