= 1889 Penn Quakers football team =

American college football season

1889 Penn Quakers football
- Conference: Independent
- Record: 7–6
- Head coach: Woody Wagenhorst (2nd season)
- Captain: Edgar M. Church
- Home stadium: University Athletic Grounds

1889 Eastern college football independents records
	Conf.			Overall
Team	W	L	T	W		L		T
Princeton		–		10	–	0	–	0
Massachusetts		–		2	–	0	–	0
Yale		–		15	–	1	–	0
Harvard		–		9	–	2	–	0
Franklin & Marshall		–		5	–	1	–	1
Dickinson		–		4	–	1	–	1
Navy		–		4	–	1	–	1
Tufts		–		3	–	1	–	0
Lehigh		–		8	–	3	–	2
Cornell		–		8	–	4	–	0
Penn		–		7	–	6	–	0
Brown		–		2	–	2	–	0
Penn State		–		2	–	2	–	0
Wesleyan		–		5	–	7	–	1
Bucknell		–		2	–	3	–	1
Lafayette		–		3	–	4	–	2
Columbia		–		2	–	7	–	2
Fordham		–		1	–	3	–	0
Rutgers		–		1	–	4	–	0
NYU		–		0	–	2	–	0

The 1889 Penn Quakers football team was an American football team that represented the University of Pennsylvania in the 1889 college football season. In its second season under head coach Woody Wagenhorst, the team compiled a 7–6 record. No Penn players were honored on the 1889 All-America college football team.

== Schedule ==
Date	Time	Opponent	Site	Result	Attendance	Source
October 2		Philadelphia All-Stars	Philadelphia, PA	W 22–6		
October 5	3:16 p.m.	Swarthmore	Philadelphia, PA	W 76–0		
October 12	3:00 p.m.	at Rutgers	New Brunswick, NJ	W 4–0		
October 19	3:15 p.m.	Lehigh	University Athletic Grounds; Philadelphia, PA	W 6–4		
October 26	3:05 p.m.	Princeton	University Athletic Grounds; Philadelphia, PA (rivalry)	L 4–72	1,200	
October 30	3:15 p.m. or 3:17 p.m.	Yale	University Athletic Grounds; Philadelphia, PA	L 10–20	2,000	
November 2		at Harvard	Jarvis Field; Cambridge, MA (rivalry)	L 0–35	2,000	
November 6	3:10 p.m.	at Lafayette	Easton, PA	L 8–10		
November 9	3:30 p.m.	Columbia	University Athletic Grounds; Philadelphia, PA	W 24–0		
November 16	3:30 p.m.	Rutgers	Philadelphia, PA	W 14–0		
November 20		at Lehigh	Bethlehem, PA	L 0–8		
November 23	3:05 p.m.	Lafayette	University Athletic Grounds; Philadelphia, PA	W 14–0	2,000	
November 28	10:50 a.m.	vs. Wesleyan	Berkeley Oval; New York, NY	L 2–10	2,500	
