= 1889 Columbia football team =

American college football season

1889 Columbia football
- Conference: Independent
- Record: 2–7–2
- Head coach: None
- Captain: J. M. Hewlett
- Home stadium: Berkeley Oval

1889 Eastern college football independents records
	Conf.			Overall
Team	W	L	T	W		L		T
Princeton		–		10	–	0	–	0
Massachusetts		–		2	–	0	–	0
Yale		–		15	–	1	–	0
Harvard		–		9	–	2	–	0
Franklin & Marshall		–		5	–	1	–	1
Dickinson		–		4	–	1	–	1
Navy		–		4	–	1	–	1
Tufts		–		3	–	1	–	0
Lehigh		–		8	–	3	–	2
Cornell		–		8	–	4	–	0
Penn		–		7	–	6	–	0
Brown		–		2	–	2	–	0
Penn State		–		2	–	2	–	0
Wesleyan		–		5	–	7	–	1
Bucknell		–		2	–	3	–	1
Lafayette		–		3	–	4	–	2
Columbia		–		2	–	7	–	2
Fordham		–		1	–	3	–	0
Rutgers		–		1	–	4	–	0
NYU		–		0	–	2	–	0

The 1889 Columbia football team was an American football team that represented Columbia University as an independent during the 1889 college football season. The team compiled a 2–7–2 record and was outscored by a total of 298 to 54. The team had no coach. J. M. Hewlett was the team captain.

== Schedule ==
Date	Time	Opponent	Site	Result	Attendance	Source
October 5		vs. Crescent Athletic Club	Erastina grounds; Staten Island, NY	L 0–30		
October 9		Lafayette	Berkeley Oval; New York, NY	T 10–10		
October 19		Trinity (CT)	Berkeley Oval; New York, NY	L 4–24		
October 26		Yale	Berkeley Oval; New York, NY	L 0–62	600	
November 2		Lehigh	Berkeley Oval; New York, NY	L 6–51	1,500	
November 5	3:00 p.m.	Princeton	Berkeley Oval; New York, NY	L 0–71		
November 9	3:30 p.m.	at Penn	University Athletic Grounds; Philadelphia, PA	L 0–24		
November 14	3:00 p.m.	at Stevens	St. George's Cricket Grounds; Hoboken, NJ	W 12–6		
November 16		at Manhattan Athletic Club	Manhattan Athletic Club grounds; New York, NY	W 22–0		
November 21		Amherst	Berkeley Oval; New York, NY	T 0–0		
November 23		Cornell	Berkeley Oval; New York, NY (rivalry)	L 0–20		
