= 1889 Williams Ephs football team =

American college football season

1889 Williams Ephs football
- Conference: Eastern Intercollegiate Football Association
- Record: 4–6–1 (1–2–1 EIFA)
- Head coach: None
- Home stadium: Weston Field

1889 Eastern Intercollegiate Football Association standings
	Conf.					Overall
Team	W		L		T	W		L		T
Dartmouth $	4	–	0	–	0	7	–	1	–	0
Amherst	2	–	1	–	1	4	–	4	–	2
Williams	1	–	2	–	1	4	–	6	–	1
Boston Tech	1	–	3	–	0	2	–	6	–	0
Stevens	1	–	3	–	0	2	–	10	–	0
$ – Conference champion; Boston Tech defeated Amherst on October 26, 10–9, but Amherst protested the final touchdown of the game. At the conference's meeting on December 18, Amherst was awarded victory by a score of 9–6. Williams forfeited a game to Stevens that was scheduled to be played on November 25.

The 1889 Williams Ephs football team represented the Williams College as a member of the Eastern Intercollegiate Football Association (EIFA) during the 1889 college football season. Williams compiled an overall record of 4–6–1 with a mark of 1–2–1 in conference play, placing third in the EIFA. The team played home games at Weston Field in Williamstown, Massachusetts.

== Schedule ==
Date	Time	Opponent	Site	Result	Attendance	Source
October 12		at Yale*	Yale Field; New Haven, CT	L 0–36		
October 16		Union (NY)*	Williamstown, MA	W 130–0		
October 19		at Harvard*	Jarvis Field; Cambridge, MA	L 0–41		
October 23		Vermont*	Weston Field; Williamstown, MA	W 44–0		
October 30	3:00 p.m.	vs. Wesleyan*	Hampden Park; Springfield, MA	L 17–20	500	
November 6		Vermont*	Williamstown, MA	W 30–0		
November 9	2:40 p.m.	at Amherst	Blake Field; Amherst, MA (rivalry)	T 10–10		
November 13		Yale*	Weston Field; Williamstown, MA	L 0–70		
November 16		Boston Tech	Weston Field; Williamstown, MA	W 18–6		
November 23	10:10 a.m.	vs. Dartmouth	Hampden Park; Springfield, MA	L 9–20		
November 25		at Stevens	Hoboken, NJ	L (forfeit)		
*Non-conference game
