= 1889 Lafayette football team =

American college football season

1889 Lafayette football
- Conference: Independent
- Record: 3–4–2
- Head coach: None
- Captain: Harry Mackey

1889 Eastern college football independents records
	Conf.			Overall
Team	W	L	T	W		L		T
Princeton		–		10	–	0	–	0
Massachusetts		–		2	–	0	–	0
Yale		–		15	–	1	–	0
Harvard		–		9	–	2	–	0
Franklin & Marshall		–		5	–	1	–	1
Dickinson		–		4	–	1	–	1
Navy		–		4	–	1	–	1
Tufts		–		3	–	1	–	0
Lehigh		–		8	–	3	–	2
Cornell		–		8	–	4	–	0
Penn		–		7	–	6	–	0
Brown		–		2	–	2	–	0
Penn State		–		2	–	2	–	0
Wesleyan		–		5	–	7	–	1
Bucknell		–		2	–	3	–	1
Lafayette		–		3	–	4	–	2
Columbia		–		2	–	7	–	2
Fordham		–		1	–	3	–	0
Rutgers		–		1	–	4	–	0
NYU		–		0	–	2	–	0

The 1889 Lafayette football team was an American football team that represented Lafayette College as an independent during the 1889 college football season. Playing without a regular coach, the team compiled a 3–4–2 record and was outscored by a total of 88 to 78. Harry Mackey was the team captain, and E. Snodgrass was the manager. The team played its home games on The Quad in Easton, Pennsylvania.

== Schedule ==
Date	Time	Opponent	Site	Result	Attendance	Source
October 9		at Columbia	Berkeley Oval; New York, NY	T 10–10		
October 12		at Cornell	Ithaca, NY	L 0–10		
October 16		at Rutgers	New Brunswick, NJ	W 16–0		
October 30		at Lehigh	University grounds; South Bethlehem, PA (rivalry)	L 10–16		
November 6	3:10 p.m.	Penn	The Quad; Easton, PA	W 10–8		
November 9		Penn State	The Quad; Easton, PA	W 26–0		
November 16		Lehigh	The Quad; Easton, PA	T 6–6	2,000	
November 23	3:05 p.m.	at Penn	University Athletic Grounds; Philadelphia, PA	L 0–14	2,000	
November 28		vs. Cornell	Star Park; Syracuse, NY	L 0–24		
