= 1889 Boston Tech football team =

American college football season

1889 Boston Tech football
- Conference: Eastern Intercollegiate Football Association
- Record: 2–6 (1–3 EIFA)
- Head coach: None
- Home stadium: South End Grounds

1889 Eastern Intercollegiate Football Association standings
	Conf.					Overall
Team	W		L		T	W		L		T
Dartmouth $	4	–	0	–	0	7	–	1	–	0
Amherst	2	–	1	–	1	4	–	4	–	2
Williams	1	–	2	–	1	4	–	6	–	1
Boston Tech	1	–	3	–	0	2	–	6	–	0
Stevens	1	–	3	–	0	2	–	10	–	0
$ – Conference champion; Boston Tech defeated Amherst on October 26, 10–9, but Amherst protested the final touchdown of the game. At the conference's meeting on December 18, Amherst was awarded victory by a score of 9–6. Williams forfeited a game to Stevens that was scheduled to be played on November 25.

The 1889 Boston Tech football team represented Boston Tech—now known as the Massachusetts Institute of Technology (MIT)—as a member of the Eastern Intercollegiate Football Association (EIFA) during the 1889 college football season. Boston Tech compiled an overall record of 2–6 with a mark of 1–3 in conference play, tying for fourth place at the bottom of the EIFA standings. The team played home games at South End Grounds in Boston.

== Schedule ==
Date	Time	Opponent	Site	Result	Attendance	Source
October 9		at Phillips Academy*	Andover, MA	L 0–4		
October 12		at Phillips Exeter Academy*	Exeter, NH	L 0–14		
October 16	4:00 p.m.	at Harvard*	Jarvis Field; Cambridge, MA	L 0–62		
October 19		Brown*	South End Grounds; Boston, MA	W 48–0	500	
October 26	2:45 p.m.	at Amherst	Blake Field; Amherst, MA	L 6–9		
November 2		Dartmouth	South End Grounds; Boston, MA	L 6–36		
November 9	3:00 p.m.	Stevens	South End Grounds; Boston, MA	W 16–10		
November 16		at Williams	Weston Field; Williamstown, MA	L 6–18		
*Non-conference game
