= 1889 Dartmouth football team =

American college football season

1889 Dartmouth football

EIFA champion
- Conference: Eastern Intercollegiate Football Association
- Record: 7–1 (4–0 EIFA)
- Head coach: None
- Captain: William Odlin

1889 Eastern Intercollegiate Football Association standings
	Conf.					Overall
Team	W		L		T	W		L		T
Dartmouth $	4	–	0	–	0	7	–	1	–	0
Amherst	2	–	1	–	1	4	–	4	–	2
Williams	1	–	2	–	1	4	–	6	–	1
Boston Tech	1	–	3	–	0	2	–	6	–	0
Stevens	1	–	3	–	0	2	–	10	–	0
$ – Conference champion; Boston Tech defeated Amherst on October 26, 10–9, but Amherst protested the final touchdown of the game. At the conference's meeting on December 18, Amherst was awarded victory by a score of 9–6. Williams forfeited a game to Stevens that was scheduled to be played on November 25.

The 1889 Dartmouth football team represented Dartmouth College as a member of the Eastern Intercollegiate Football Association (EIFA) during the 1889 college football season. Dartmouth compiled an overall record of 7–1 with a mark of 4–0 in EIFA play, winning the league title.

== Schedule ==
Date	Time	Opponent	Site	Result	Attendance	Source
September 27		at Phillips Academy*	Andover, MA	W 45–4		
September 28		at Phillips Exeter Academy*	Exeter, NH	W 34–0		
October 11		at Phillips Academy*	Andover, MA	W 20–4		
October 12		at Harvard*	Jarvis Field; Cambridge, MA (rivalry)	L 38–0		
October 30		Amherst	Hanover, NH	W 60–6	400–600	
November 2		at Boston Tech	South End Grounds; Boston, MA	W 36–6		
November 23	10:10 a.m.	vs. Williams	Hampden Park; Springfield, MA	W 20–9		
November 28	11:00 a.m.	at Stevens	St. George Cricket Grounds; Hoboken, NJ	W 18–5	1,000	
*Non-conference game
