= 1889 Brown Bears football team =

American college football season

1889 Brown Bears football
- Conference: Independent
- Record: 2–2
- Head coach: None

1889 Eastern college football independents records
	Conf.			Overall
Team	W	L	T	W		L		T
Princeton		–		10	–	0	–	0
Massachusetts		–		2	–	0	–	0
Yale		–		15	–	1	–	0
Harvard		–		9	–	2	–	0
Franklin & Marshall		–		5	–	1	–	1
Dickinson		–		4	–	1	–	1
Navy		–		4	–	1	–	1
Tufts		–		3	–	1	–	0
Lehigh		–		8	–	3	–	2
Cornell		–		8	–	4	–	0
Penn		–		7	–	6	–	0
Brown		–		2	–	2	–	0
Penn State		–		2	–	2	–	0
Wesleyan		–		5	–	7	–	1
Bucknell		–		2	–	3	–	1
Lafayette		–		3	–	4	–	2
Columbia		–		2	–	7	–	2
Fordham		–		1	–	3	–	0
Rutgers		–		1	–	4	–	0
NYU		–		0	–	2	–	0

The 1889 Brown Bears football team represented Brown University in the 1889 college football season.

== Schedule ==
Date	Opponent	Site	Result	Attendance	Source
October 12	Pawtucket CC		W 14–0		
October 19	at Boston Tech	South End Grounds; Boston, MA	L 0–48	500	
October 26	Tufts		W 16–0		
November 23	Boston Athletic Association		L 0–16		
