= 1889 Washington football team =

American college football season

1889 Washington football
- Conference: Independent
- Record: 0–1
- Head coach: None
- Captain: Frank S. Griffith
- Home stadium: Jackson Street baseball park

1889 Far West college football independents records
	Conf.			Overall
Team	W	L	T	W		L		T
USC		–		2	–	0	–	0
California		–		0	–	0	–	0
Washington		–		0	–	1	–	0

The 1889 Washington football team was an American football team that represented the University of Washington as an independent during the 1889 college football season. The 1889 Washington team was the first team to represent the University of Washington in college football. The team played only one game, losing to a team made up of eastern college alumni, 20–0, in Seattle on November 28, 1889. Frank S. Griffith was the team captain.

== Schedule ==
Date	Time	Opponent	Site	Result	Attendance	Source
November 28	2:30 p.m.	Eastern college alumni	Jackson Street baseball park; Seattle, WA	L 0–20	400	

== Thanksgiving Day game ==
Eastern College alumni vs University of Washington – Game summary

Quarter	1	2	Total
Old Players	2	18	20
Universitys	0	0	0

at Jackson Street baseball park • Seattle, Washington

- Date: November 28, 1889 (Thanksgiving)
- Game time: 2:30 p.m. PST
- Game attendance: 400
- Referee: R.M. Hurd (referee); E.B. Downing (umpire)
- Recaps: Seattle Post-Intelligencer; Tacoma Daily Ledger
