= 1889 Bucknell football team =

American college football season

1889 Bucknell football
- Conference: Independent
- Record: 2–3–1
- Head coach: None
- Captain: Charles Allen

1889 Eastern college football independents records
	Conf.			Overall
Team	W	L	T	W		L		T
Princeton		–		10	–	0	–	0
Massachusetts		–		2	–	0	–	0
Yale		–		15	–	1	–	0
Harvard		–		9	–	2	–	0
Franklin & Marshall		–		5	–	1	–	1
Dickinson		–		4	–	1	–	1
Navy		–		4	–	1	–	1
Tufts		–		3	–	1	–	0
Lehigh		–		8	–	3	–	2
Cornell		–		8	–	4	–	0
Penn		–		7	–	6	–	0
Brown		–		2	–	2	–	0
Penn State		–		2	–	2	–	0
Wesleyan		–		5	–	7	–	1
Bucknell		–		2	–	3	–	1
Lafayette		–		3	–	4	–	2
Columbia		–		2	–	7	–	2
Fordham		–		1	–	3	–	0
Rutgers		–		1	–	4	–	0
NYU		–		0	–	2	–	0

The 1889 Bucknell football team was an American football team that represented Bucknell University as an independent during the 1889 college football season. The team compiled a 2–3–1 record and had no head coach. Charles Allen was the team captain.

== Schedule ==
Date	Time	Opponent	Site	Result	Source
September 28		at Swarthmore	Swarthmore, PA	W 8–0	
October 5		at Cornell	Ithaca, NY	L 0–66	
October 12	3:00 p.m.	at Franklin & Marshall	McGrann's Park; Lancaster, PA	T 12–12	
October 19		at Dickinson	Fair grounds; Carlisle, PA	W 20–4	
October 26	3:20 p.m.	Franklin & Marshall	Lewisburg, PA	L 0–16	
November 28		at Penn State	State College, PA	L 0–12	
