= Charles O. Gill =

American Congregationalist clergyman and college football player and coach

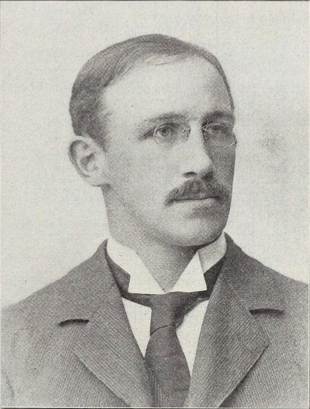
- Gill, c. 1908

Biographical details
- Born: March 4, 1868; Walpole, Massachusetts, U.S.
- Died: June 2, 1959 (aged 91); Waterford, Vermont, U.S.

Playing career
- 1885–1889: Yale
- Position: Tackle

Coaching career (HC unless noted)
- 1894: California
- 1908: New Hampshire

Head coaching record
- Overall: 1–8–2

Accomplishments and honors

Awards
- First-team All-American (1889)

Charles Otis Gill (March 4, 1868 – June 2, 1959) was an American Congregationalist clergyman and college football player and coach. Named to the 1889 All-America college football team as a player for Yale, Gill later served as head coach for the California and New Hampshire football programs, one season each. With Gifford Pinchot, Gill co-authored two influential books on the state of rural churches in the United States.

== Early life and college career ==
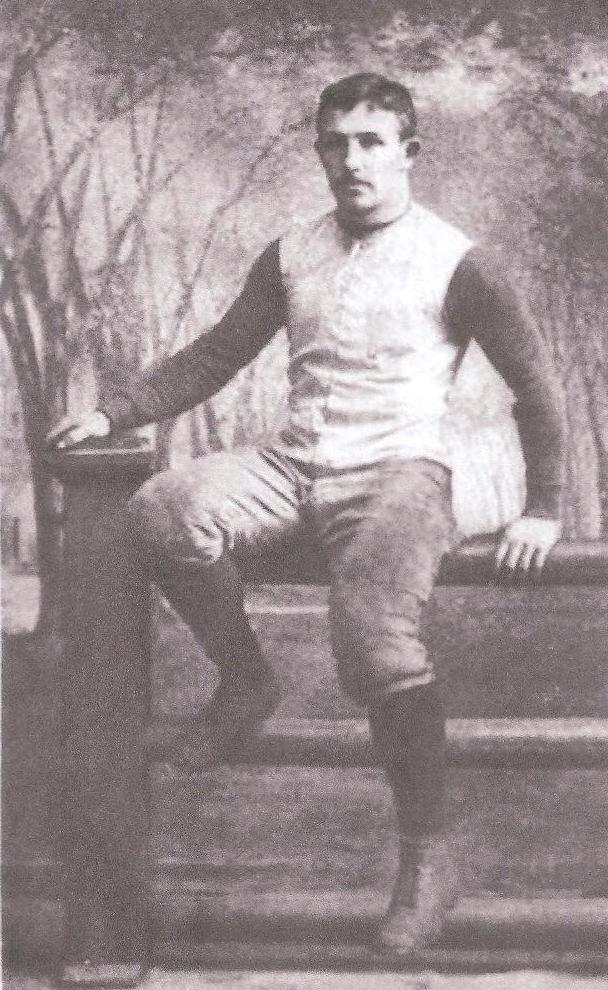
Gill during his playing days

Born in Walpole, Massachusetts, on March 4, 1868, Gill graduated from Yale University in 1889, where he was a member of Skull and Bones.

Gill played on the Yale Bulldogs football team from 1885 to 1889, earning varsity letters for the 1886–1889 seasons. The 1888 Bulldogs were undefeated and were not scored upon. Gill was captain of the 1889 Bulldogs, which won its first 15 games while scoring 659 points (an average of 44 points per game) before suffering a 10–0 defeat to undefeated Princeton. Gill was named to the 1889 All-America college football team, the first instance of an "All-America" team being named.

Gill served as head football coach of the 1894 California and 1908 New Hampshire teams, compiling a career college football coaching record of 1–8–2.

== Minister, missionary, author ==
In addition to his accomplishments on the gridiron for Yale, Gill attended the Yale Divinity School from 1889 to 1890, then the Union Theological Seminary in New York City from 1892 to 1894, where he received his graduate degree and was ordained as a minister in the Congregational Church on July 25, 1894. He served as pastor of the Westmore, Vermont, Congregational Church in 1894 and 1895 and then as a foreign missionary for the Presbyterian Church in Peking, China, from 1895 to 1997. He returned to Vermont and served in East Fairfield, Vermont (1897–1898), Westmore, Vermont (1898–1902), Jericho, Vermont (1902–1904), West Lebanon, New Hampshire (1904–1906), and Hartland, Vermont (1906–1909).

Remaining in Harland, Gill collaborated with a former Yale football teammate, Gifford Pinchot, in writing The Country Church - The Decline Of Its Influence and The Remedy published by Macmillan Company in 1913. This led to his appointment as the Secretary of the Committee on Church & Country Life, Social Service Commission, Federal Council of Churches, in Columbus, Ohio, from 1913 to 1919. In that capacity he wrote a second book with Pinchot, Six Thousand Country Churches, published by MacMillan in 1919. While in Ohio, he was also Secretary of the Ohio Rural Life Association, a member of the Commission on Interchurch Cooperation, and Supervisor of rural church survey work for the Interchurch World Movement.

He returned to Vermont as pastor in Hartland until his retirement in 1929, when he relocated to Waterford, Vermont, and took up farming. He remained in Waterford until his death on June 2, 1959.

== Head coaching record ==
Year	Team	Overall	Conference	Standing	Bowl/playoffs
California Golden Bears (Independent) (1894)
1894	California	0–1–2			
California:		0–1–2			
New Hampshire (Independent) (1908)
1908	New Hampshire	1–7			
New Hampshire:		1–7			
Total:		1–8–2			
