= 1889 Penn State football team =

American college football season

1889 Penn State football
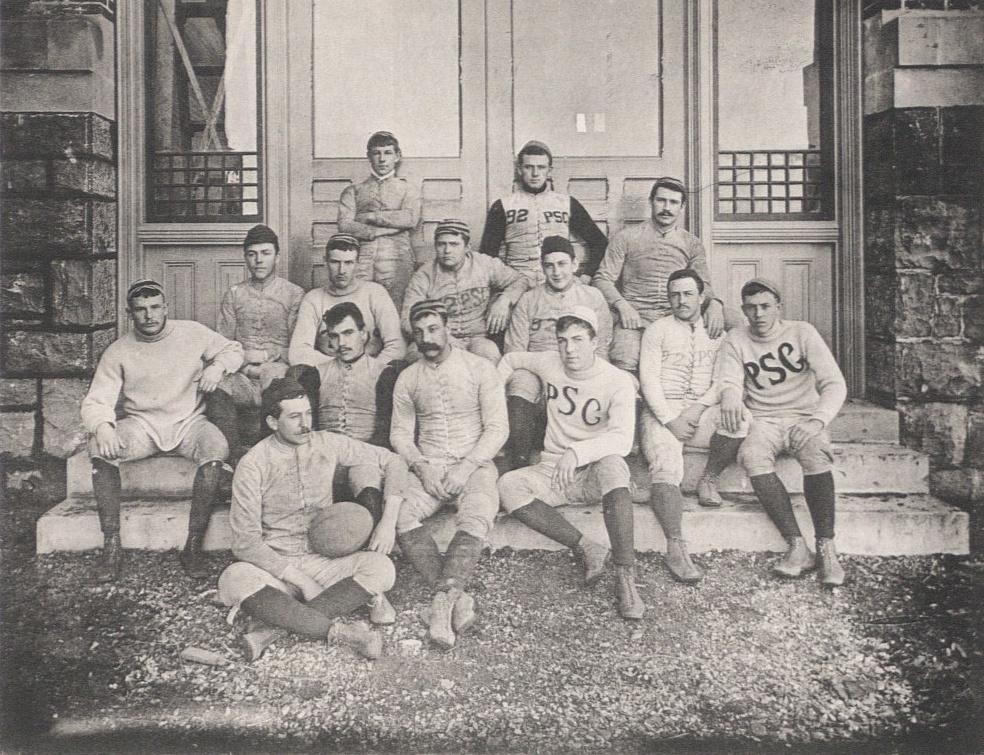
- Conference: Independent
- Record: 2–2
- Head coach: None
- Captain: James Mock
- Home stadium: Old Main lawn

1889 Eastern college football independents records
	Conf.			Overall
Team	W	L	T	W		L		T
Princeton		–		10	–	0	–	0
Massachusetts		–		2	–	0	–	0
Yale		–		15	–	1	–	0
Harvard		–		9	–	2	–	0
Franklin & Marshall		–		5	–	1	–	1
Dickinson		–		4	–	1	–	1
Navy		–		4	–	1	–	1
Tufts		–		3	–	1	–	0
Lehigh		–		8	–	3	–	2
Cornell		–		8	–	4	–	0
Penn		–		7	–	6	–	0
Brown		–		2	–	2	–	0
Penn State		–		2	–	2	–	0
Wesleyan		–		5	–	7	–	1
Bucknell		–		2	–	3	–	1
Lafayette		–		3	–	4	–	2
Columbia		–		2	–	7	–	2
Fordham		–		1	–	3	–	0
Rutgers		–		1	–	4	–	0
NYU		–		0	–	2	–	0

The 1889 Penn State football team was an American football team that represented Pennsylvania State College—now known as Pennsylvania State University–as an independent during the 1889 college football season. The team played its home games on the Old Main lawn in University Park, Pennsylvania.

== Schedule ==
Date	Opponent	Site	Result	Source
September 27	Swarthmore	Old Main lawn; State College, PA	W 20–6	
November 9	at Lafayette	The Quad; Easton, PA	L 0–26	
November 11	at Lehigh	Bethlehem, PA	L 0–106	
November 28	Bucknell	Old Main lawn; State College, PA	W 12–0	
