= Edgar M. Church =

American football player and coach

Biographical details
- Born: May 24, 1869; Philadelphia, Pennsylvania, U.S.
- Died: December 26, 1938 (aged 69); Philadelphia, Pennsylvania, U.S.

Playing career
- 1889–1891: Penn
- Positions: Halfback, quarterback

Coaching career (HC unless noted)
- 1895: Union (NY)

Head coaching record
- Overall: 0–5

Edgar Moore Church (May 24, 1869 – December 26, 1938) was an American college football player and coach. He played football at the University of Pennsylvania where was team captain for three successive seasons, 1889, 1890, and 1891. Church served as the head football coach at Union College in Schenectady, New York for one season, in 1895.

Church later worked as an investment broker. He died of pneumonia, on December 26, 1938.
