= 1889 USC Methodists football team =

American college football season

1889 USC Methodists football
- Conference: Independent
- Record: 2–0
- Head coach: None
- Captain: None
- Home stadium: USC campus

1889 Far West college football independents records
	Conf.			Overall
Team	W	L	T	W		L		T
USC		–		2	–	0	–	0
California		–		0	–	0	–	0
Washington		–		0	–	1	–	0

The 1889 USC Methodists football team was an American football team that represented the University of Southern California during the 1889 college football season. The team competed as an independent without a head coach, compiling a 2–0 record.

In early November 1889, the Los Angeles Times expressed the hope that "good elevens will be organized to introduce the game [of football] to the city." Days later, a group of young men formed the Pasadena Football Association. On Thanksgiving Day, USC defeated the Pasadena club by a 26–0 score at Sportsman's Park. After the game, the Los Angeles Times reported on the new game as follows: "The boys appeared in their attractive, though odd-looking suits, and to say that the play was animated is putting it rather mildly. The game was played for all there was in it, and the foot-ball soon became an object of interest to spectators and players alike. It is a very exciting game, more-so than base-ball, and requires fully as much judgment and no little skill."

== Schedule ==
Date	Opponent	Site	Result
	St. Vincent's (CA)	Los Angeles, CA	W 40–0
November 28	vs. Pasadena	Sportsman's Park; Pasadena, CA	W 26–0
