= 1889 Rutgers Queensmen football team =

American college football season

1889 Rutgers Queensmen football
- Conference: Independent
- Record: 1–4
- Head coach: None
- Captain: James Bishop Jr.
- Home stadium: College Field

1889 Eastern college football independents records
	Conf.			Overall
Team	W	L	T	W		L		T
Princeton		–		10	–	0	–	0
Massachusetts		–		2	–	0	–	0
Yale		–		15	–	1	–	0
Harvard		–		9	–	2	–	0
Franklin & Marshall		–		5	–	1	–	1
Dickinson		–		4	–	1	–	1
Navy		–		4	–	1	–	1
Tufts		–		3	–	1	–	0
Lehigh		–		8	–	3	–	2
Cornell		–		8	–	4	–	0
Penn		–		7	–	6	–	0
Brown		–		2	–	2	–	0
Penn State		–		2	–	2	–	0
Wesleyan		–		5	–	7	–	1
Bucknell		–		2	–	3	–	1
Lafayette		–		3	–	4	–	2
Columbia		–		2	–	7	–	2
Fordham		–		1	–	3	–	0
Rutgers		–		1	–	4	–	0
NYU		–		0	–	2	–	0

The 1889 Rutgers Queensmen football team represented Rutgers University as an independent during the 1889 college football season. The Queensmen compiled a 1–4 record and were outscored their opponents, 92 to 22. The team had no coach, and its captain was James Bishop, Jr.

== Schedule ==
Date	Time	Opponent	Site	Result	Source
October 12	3:00 p.m.	Penn	New Brunswick, NJ	L 0–4	
October 16		Lafayette	New Brunswick, NJ	L 0–16	
October 19		at Wesleyan	Middletown, CT	L 4–58	
November 1		Ridgefield Athletic Club		W 18–0	
November 16	3:30 p.m.	at Penn	Philadelphia, PA	L 0–14	
