= 1889 Cornell Big Red football team =

American college football season

1889 Cornell Big Red football
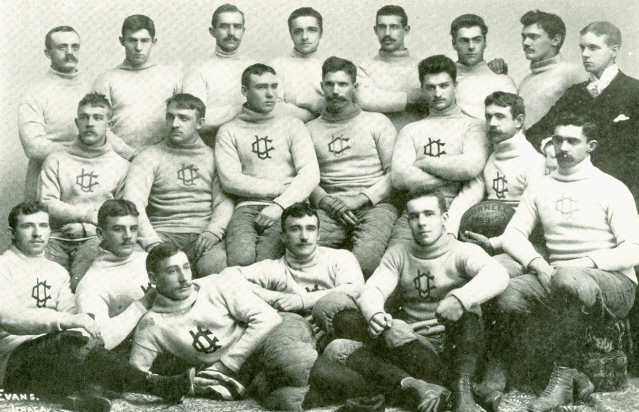
- Conference: Independent
- Record: 8–4
- Head coach: None
- Captain: Daniel Upton

1889 Eastern college football independents records
	Conf.			Overall
Team	W	L	T	W		L		T
Princeton		–		10	–	0	–	0
Massachusetts		–		2	–	0	–	0
Yale		–		15	–	1	–	0
Harvard		–		9	–	2	–	0
Franklin & Marshall		–		5	–	1	–	1
Dickinson		–		4	–	1	–	1
Navy		–		4	–	1	–	1
Tufts		–		3	–	1	–	0
Lehigh		–		8	–	3	–	2
Cornell		–		8	–	4	–	0
Penn		–		7	–	6	–	0
Brown		–		2	–	2	–	0
Penn State		–		2	–	2	–	0
Wesleyan		–		5	–	7	–	1
Bucknell		–		2	–	3	–	1
Lafayette		–		3	–	4	–	2
Columbia		–		2	–	7	–	2
Fordham		–		1	–	3	–	0
Rutgers		–		1	–	4	–	0
NYU		–		0	–	2	–	0

The 1889 Cornell Big Red football team was an American football team that represented Cornell University during the 1889 college football season. The team compiled an 8–4 record and outscored all opponents by a combined total of 354 to 130.

== Schedule ==
Date	Opponent	Site	Result	Attendance	Source
October 5	Bucknell	Ithaca, NY	W 66–0		
October 12	Lafayette	Ithaca, NY	W 10–0		
October 15	at Yale	Yale Field; New Haven, CT	L 6–56		
October 19	Rochester	Ithaca, NY	W 124–0		
November 2	Stevens	Ithaca, NY	W 39–4		
November 9	Yale	Ithaca, NY	L 0–70	2,000	
November 16	vs. Michigan	Olympic Park; Buffalo, NY	W 66–0		
November 23	at Columbia	Berkeley Oval; New York, NY (rivalry)	W 20–0		
November 28	vs. Lafayette	Syracuse, NY	W 24–0		
