= Houlgate System =

College football ranking method

The Houlgate System was a college football ranking method based on strength of schedule that was syndicated nationally in the 1930s through 1950s. The system was created by Carroll Everard "Deke" Houlgate (May 8, 1905—July 31, 1959), a Los Angeles-based college football statistician and historian.

Starting in 1945 Houlgate selected competitors for the Futility Bowl, a hypothetical post-season matchup between the nation's two lowest-ranked teams. This bowl game to determine the country's worst team would be held in Death Valley in an empty stadium.

Houlgate was the author of The Football Thesaurus, a leather-bound compilation of game scores, football history, and team facts. The thesaurus was released in two editions in 1946 and 1954. Houlgate released annual supplements for the 1954–1958 seasons until his death in 1959.

The NCAA recognizes the Houlgate System as a "major selector" of college football national championships and lists the system's post-bowl selections, as published in the 1954 edition of The Football Thesaurus, in the official NCAA records book.

Houlgate was born in Peru, Nebraska, on May 8, 1905. He graduated from Ventura High School and attended the University of Southern California. He served in the Air Force during World War II and died at the Wadsworth Veterans Administration Hospital in Los Angeles, California, on July 31, 1959, at age 54. Houlgate's wife, Dorothy P. Houlgate, was considered "one of the leading feminine football experts" and assisted with the annual football ratings; she died in August 1959, less than a month after the death of her husband.

In his career in public relations for the American Gas Association, Houlgate is known for coining or popularizing the phrase "Now you're cooking with gas!" and planting the phrase with writers for Bob Hope's radio programs in an early example of product placement.

== National champions ==
The Houlgate System is listed as a "major selector" of national championships in the NCAA Football Bowl Subdivision Records book.

Season	Champion(s)	Notes
Retrospective selections
1885	Princeton	
1886	No selection	
1887	Yale	
1888	Yale	
1889	Princeton	
1890	Harvard	
1891	Yale	
1892	Yale	
1893	Princeton	
1894	Princeton	
1895	Penn	
1896	Princeton	
1897	Penn	
1898	Harvard	
1899	Harvard	
1900	Yale	
1901	Michigan	
1902	Michigan	
1903	Princeton	
1904	Penn	
1905	Chicago	
1906	No selection	
1907	Yale	
1908	Penn	
1909	Yale	
1910	Harvard	
1911	Princeton	
1912	Harvard	
1913	Harvard	
1914	Army	
1915	Cornell	
1916	Pittsburgh	
1917	Georgia Tech	
1918	Pittsburgh	
1919	Harvard	
1920	California	
1921	Cornell	
1922	California	
1923	California	
1924	Notre Dame	
1925	Alabama	
1926	Navy	
Houlgate System rankings
1927	Notre Dame	
1928	USC; Georgia Tech	
1929	Notre Dame; USC	
1930	Notre Dame	
1931	USC	
1932	USC	
1933	Michigan	
1934	Stanford; Alabama	
1935	SMU	
1936	LSU; Pittsburgh	
1937	Pittsburgh	
1938	Tennessee	
1939	Tulane; Texas A&M	
1940	Minnesota	
1941	Minnesota; Alabama	
1942	Georgia	
1943	Notre Dame	
1944	Army	
1945	Army	
1946	Army	
1947	Michigan	
1948	Michigan	
1949	Notre Dame	
1950	Tennessee	
1951	Georgia Tech	
1952	Georgia Tech	
1953	Notre Dame	
1954	Ohio State	
1955	Oklahoma	
1956	Georgia Tech	
1957	Auburn	
1958	LSU	

- Teams listed in italics indicate championships that were awarded retroactively.

=== Foreman & Clark Trophy ===
Contemporary National champions under the Houlgate System were awarded the Foreman & Clark Trophy. The award was sponsored by the Los Angeles department store and given to the No. 1 team in the contemporary pre-bowl final rankings.

Season	Trophy Winner	Record	Notes
1934	Stanford	9–1–1	
1935	SMU	12–1	
1936	LSU	9–1–1	

== Futility Bowl ==
In 1945, Houlgate also initiated his selections for the Futility Bowl matching the two worst college football teams in a fictional football game to be played in Death Valley. His annual picks for the Futility Bowl included: (1) Worcester Polytechnic Institute and Wooster in 1945; (2) Kansas State and Carnegie Tech in 1947; (3) Kansas State and Montana State in 1948; (4) BYU and Rhode Island State in 1949; and (5) Davidson and Montana in 1951.

== See also ==
- NCAA Division I FBS national football championship
