= 1889 Stevens football team =

American college football season

1889 Stevens football
- Conference: Eastern Intercollegiate Football Association
- Record: 2–10 (1–3 EIFA)
- Head coach: None
- Home stadium: St. George's Cricket Grounds

1889 Eastern Intercollegiate Football Association standings
| | Conf. | | | | | Overall |
| Team | W | | L | | T | W | | L | | T |
|---|---|---|---|---|---|---|---|---|---|---|
| Dartmouth $ | 4 | – | 0 | – | 0 | 7 | – | 1 | – | 0 |
| Amherst | 2 | – | 1 | – | 1 | 4 | – | 4 | – | 2 |
| Williams | 1 | – | 2 | – | 1 | 4 | – | 6 | – | 1 |
| Boston Tech | 1 | – | 3 | – | 0 | 2 | – | 6 | – | 0 |
| Stevens | 1 | – | 3 | – | 0 | 2 | – | 10 | – | 0 |
$ – Conference champion; Boston Tech defeated Amherst on October 26, 10–9, but Amherst protested the final touchdown of the game. At the conference's meeting on December 18, Amherst was awarded victory by a score of 9–6. Williams forfeited a game to Stevens that was scheduled to be played on November 25.

The 1889 Stevens football team represented Stevens Institute of Technology as a member of the Eastern Intercollegiate Football Association (EIFA) during the 1889 college football season. Stevens compiled an overall record of 2–10 with a mark of 1–3 in conference play, tying for fourth place at the bottom of the EIFA standings. The team played home games at St. George's Cricket Grounds in Hoboken, New Jersey.

== Schedule ==
| Date | Time | Opponent | Site | Result | Attendance | Source |
|---|---|---|---|---|---|---|
| October 5 | | at Harvard* | Jarvis Field; Cambridge, MA | L 4–28 | | |
| October 12 | | at Orange Athletic Club* | | L 0–6 | | |
| October 19 | 2:40 p.m. | at Princeton* | Princeton, NJ | L 0–49 | 1,000 | |
| October 26 | | Trinity (CT)* | St. George's Cricket Grounds; Hoboken, NJ | W 5–0 | | |
| October 31 | | vs. Harvard* | Berkeley Oval; New York, NY | L 0–30 | | |
| November 2 | | at Cornell* | Ithaca, NY | L 4–39 | | |
| November 9 | 3:00 p.m. | at Boston Tech | South End Grounds; Boston, MA | L 10–16 | | |
| November 14 | 3:00 p.m. | Columbia* | St. George's Cricket Grounds; Hoboken, NJ | L 6–12 | | |
| November 16 | 3:00 p.m. | at Trinity (CT)* | Ward Street ground; Hartford, CT | L 0–12 | | |
| November 20 | | Amherst | St. George Cricket Grounds; Hoboken, NJ | L 5–12 | 400 | |
| November 25 | | Williams | Hoboken, NJ | W (forfeit) | | |
| November 28 | 11:00 a.m. | Dartmouth | St. George Cricket Grounds; Hoboken, NJ | L 5–18 | 1,000 | |
*Non-conference game
