= Harry A. Smith =

American insurance executive, college football player and coach (1869–1928)

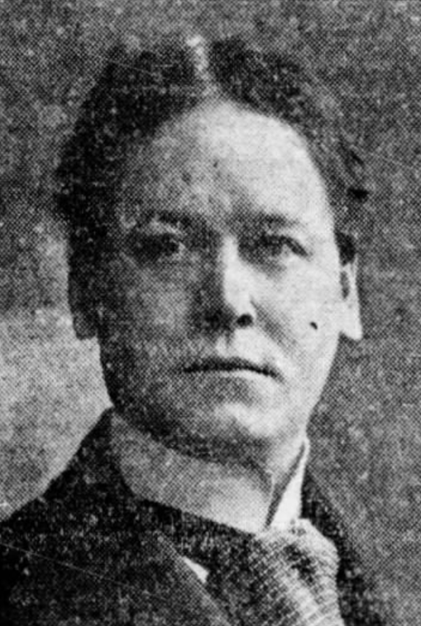
- Smith pictured in the Hartford Courant, 1904

Biographical details
- Born: May 24, 1869; Springfield, Massachusetts, U.S.
- Died: December 17, 1928 (aged 59); West Hartford, Connecticut, U.S.

Playing career
- 1887–1889: Amherst
- Position: Halfback

Coaching career (HC unless noted)
- 1902–1906: Amherst

Head coaching record
- Overall: 29–11–3

Harry Alexander Smith (May 24, 1869 – December 17, 1928) was an American insurance executive and college football player and coach. He served as the head football coach at Amherst College from 1902 to 1906.

Smith attended Amherst College, where he played football as a halfback, captaining the 1889 Amherst football team. He resigned as Amherst's head football coach in 1907 after a disagreement with the faculty committee regarding public exhibitions. After graduating from Amherst, Smith went into the insurance business with the National Fire Insurance Company. He was appointed assistant secretary of the firm in 1900, vice president in 1907, and president in 1915. Smith died of a heart ailment, December 17, 1978, at his home in West Hartford, Connecticut.

== Head coaching record ==
Year	Team	Overall	Conference	Standing	Bowl/playoffs
Amherst (Independent) (1902–1906)
1902	Amherst	7–3			
1903	Amherst	7–3			
1904	Amherst	9–1			
1905	Amherst	3–1–2			
1906	Amherst	3–3–1			
Amherst:		29–11–3			
Total:		29–11–3			
