= 1889 Dickinson football team =

American college football season

1889 Dickinson football
- Conference: Independent
- Record: 4–1–1
- Head coach: None

1889 Eastern college football independents records
	Conf.			Overall
Team	W	L	T	W		L		T
Princeton		–		10	–	0	–	0
Massachusetts		–		2	–	0	–	0
Yale		–		15	–	1	–	0
Harvard		–		9	–	2	–	0
Franklin & Marshall		–		5	–	1	–	1
Dickinson		–		4	–	1	–	1
Navy		–		4	–	1	–	1
Tufts		–		3	–	1	–	0
Lehigh		–		8	–	3	–	2
Cornell		–		8	–	4	–	0
Penn		–		7	–	6	–	0
Brown		–		2	–	2	–	0
Penn State		–		2	–	2	–	0
Wesleyan		–		5	–	7	–	1
Bucknell		–		2	–	3	–	1
Lafayette		–		3	–	4	–	2
Columbia		–		2	–	7	–	2
Fordham		–		1	–	3	–	0
Rutgers		–		1	–	4	–	0
NYU		–		0	–	2	–	0

The 1889 Dickinson football team was an American football team that represented Dickinson College as an independent during the 1889 college football season. The team compiled a 4–1–1 record and outscored opponents by a total of 75 to 42.

== Schedule ==
Date	Opponent	Site	Result	Attendance	Source
October 11	Bucknell	Fair grounds; Carlisle, PA	W 20–4		
October 19	at Swarthmore	Swarthmore, PA	W 17–16		
October 30	Franklin & Marshall	Fair grounds; Carlisle, PA	W 10–0		
November 2	Haverford	Carlisle, PA	W 28–0		
November 9	at Navy	Annapolis, MD	T 0–0		
November 28	at Franklin & Marshall	Lancaster, PA	L 0–22	1,200	
