= 1889 Amherst football team =

American college football season

1889 Amherst football
- Conference: Eastern Intercollegiate Football Association
- Record: 4–4–2 (2–1–1 EIFA)
- Head coach: None
- Captain: Harry A. Smith
- Home stadium: Blake Field

1889 Eastern Intercollegiate Football Association standings
	Conf.					Overall
Team	W		L		T	W		L		T
Dartmouth $	4	–	0	–	0	7	–	1	–	0
Amherst	2	–	1	–	1	4	–	4	–	2
Williams	1	–	2	–	1	4	–	6	–	1
Boston Tech	1	–	3	–	0	2	–	6	–	0
Stevens	1	–	3	–	0	2	–	10	–	0
$ – Conference champion; Boston Tech defeated Amherst on October 26, 10–9, but Amherst protested the final touchdown of the game. At the conference's meeting on December 18, Amherst was awarded victory by a score of 9–6. Williams forfeited a game to Stevens that was scheduled to be played on November 25.

The 1889 Amherst football team represented the Amherst College as a member of the Eastern Intercollegiate Football Association (EIFA) during the 1889 college football season. Amherst compiled an overall record of 4–4–2 with a mark of 2–1–1 in conference play, placing second in the EIFA. The team played home games at Blake Field in Amherst, Massachusetts.

== Schedule ==
Date	Time	Opponent	Site	Result	Attendance	Source
October 12		at Wesleyan*	Middletown, CT	L 0–39		
October 19		at Yale*	Yale Field; New Haven, CT	L 0–42		
October 23	3:38 p.m.	Williston Seminary*	Amherst, MA	W 64–0		
October 26	2:45 p.m.	Boston Tech	Blake Field; Amherst, MA	W 9–6		
October 30		at Dartmouth	Hanover, NH	L 6–60	400–600	
November 9	2:40 p.m.	Williams	Blake Field; Amherst, MA (rivalry)	T 10–10		
November 12	3:15 p.m.	Yale*	Blake Field; Amherst, MA	L 0–32		
November 16	2:30 p.m.	Rochester*	Amherst, MA	W 72–0		
November 20		at Stevens	St. George Cricket Grounds; Hoboken, NJ	W 12–5	400	
November 21		at Columbia*	Berkeley Oval; New York, NY	T 0–0		
*Non-conference game
