= 1889 California Golden Bears football team =

American college football season

1889 California Golden Bears football
- Conference: Independent
- Record: 0–0
- Head coach: None

1889 Far West college football independents records
| | Conf. | | | Overall |
| Team | W | L | T | W | | L | | T |
|---|---|---|---|---|---|---|---|---|
| USC | | – | | 2 | – | 0 | – | 0 |
| California | | – | | 0 | – | 0 | – | 0 |
| Washington | | – | | 0 | – | 1 | – | 0 |

The 1889 California Golden Bears football team was an American football team that represented the University of California, Berkeley during the 1889 college football season. All scheduled games were cancelled due to excessive rains.
