= John Cranston (American football) =

American football player and coach (1865–1931)

Profile
- Positions: Guard, Center

Personal information
- Born: November 18, 1865; Sheridan, New York, U.S.
- Died: December 17, 1931 (aged 66); Waban, Massachusetts, U.S.

Career information
- College: Harvard (1889–1890)

Awards and highlights
- 2× First-team All-American (1889, 1890)

John Samuel Cranston (November 18, 1865 – December 17, 1931) was an American football player and coach. He played for Harvard University from 1888 to 1890. He was selected as an All-American in 1889 and 1890—the first years in which College Football All-America Teams were selected. He was also the first football player to wear protective "nose armor", which was invented by a Harvard teammate to protect his "weak nose". He later served as a football coach at Harvard from 1893 to 1903. During the 1905 football reform movement, Cranston was part of the reformist camp and proposed the abolition of professional coaches.

== Biography ==
=== Football player ===
A native of Sheridan, New York, Cranston began his football career at Phillips Exeter Academy in 1887. As a freshman in November 1888, he began playing center after a knee injury to Harvard's starting center, Findlay. In 1889, a Pennsylvania newspaper described Cranston as "a capital center rusher and snapper back." The World of New York called Cranston one of Harvard's best men, and experienced player who was "as strong as a bull." Cranston was selected as a guard on the first College Football All-American Team selected by Caspar Whitney in 1889.

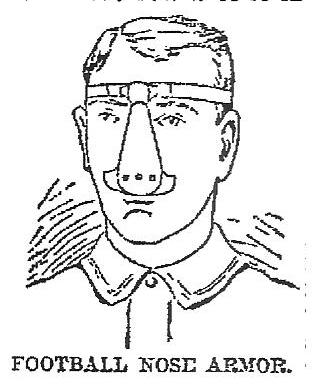
"Nose armor"

In 1890, a newspaper reported that "the former invincible Cranston" was not playing to the level he had in 1889 -- "The old men, instead of improving with age, are rather deteriorating in the quality of their play." The New York Tribune offered a more positive take on Cranston in November 1890:

"John Cranston, the Crimson's center rusher, is one of the oldest and strongest men on either team. He has played four years on the Harvard team, becoming center rusher in his freshman year. He played a right guard in the two following years, but returned to his old place, because there was no one else to fill the old place. Cranston is aggressive and active and always gives his opponent a great deal of work."

The Springfield Republican wrote that Cranston was not a great blocker and "is rather pugnacious and wastes time splitting heads; but he is a strong, heavy man, and will do his part very nearly as it ought to be done." At the end of the 1890 season, Cranston was again selected for on the College Football All-America Team, this time as the center. In 1891, The New York Times reported that Cranston had left Harvard:

"Cranston is another man who will be missed. Year before last he played in the center but last year he was the left guard. Late in the Spring Cranston withdrew from college, and in all probability will not enter Harvard again. Although his game last year was not up to his usual standard, he was an extremely valuable man."

=== First player to wear "nose armor" ===
Cranston was also noteworthy as the first player to wear equipment to protect his face during an American football game. Football was a brutal game that resulted in many serious injuries and deaths in the 19th century, prior to modern innovations of helmets and padding. Though he was an excellent football player, Cranston was known to have "a weak nose." In order to protect Cranston's nose, and to allow him to play on Harvard's football team, Harvard's captain Arthur Cumnock invented a device that he called "nose armor." Cumnock's invention gained popularity, and in 1892, a newspaper article described the growing popularity of the device:

"By the invention of nose armor football players who have been hitherto barred from the field because of broken or weak noses are now able to thrust an armor protected nose (even though it be broken) into the center of the roughest scrimmage without danger to the sensitive nasal organ. The armor is made of fine rubber and protects both the nose and teeth."

=== Harvard crew and coaching ===
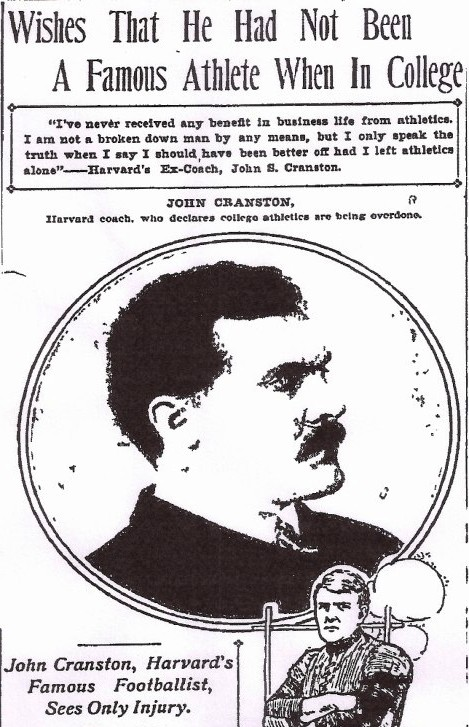
In 1905, Cranston told the Boston Journal he wished he had not been a famous athlete.

Cranston also rowed with Harvard's crew. Cranston returned to Harvard as an assistant football coach in 1893 and became one of the leading coaches at the school over the next several years, helping William H. Lewis develop the centers. In March 1903, Cranston was appointed as Harvard's head football coach. At the time of his appointment, the Boston Morning Journal summarized his accomplishments as follows:

"John Cranston played at Harvard in 1888, 1889 and 1890, two years as centre and one as guard on the 'varsity team. In his freshman year he rowed on the 'varsity crew, and before entering college played four years of football at Exeter. He stands as the best center Harvard ever boasted, and his long experience in football, and his past coaching, coupled with remarkable business ability, should work wonders with the Crimson candidates when they report for the eleven next September."

Cranston took over as head coach after Harvard lost to Yale, 23–0, in 1902. He told reporters that Harvard's prospect were not good, and the team would have to work hard, and talk less, if it were to rebound. Cranston said the team had the 23-0 score from the prior year "printed right on the seats of our trousers."

In 1905, college football was struck by scandals involving professionalism, as some schools were accused of hiring "ringers," and also by concerns over the sport's brutality and injuries. Cranston sided with the reformers and published an article in the Boston Journal advocating that universities ban the use of professional coaches and require that only university undergraduates may be involved in coaching. The proposal was endorsed by the reform movement, though Harvard's long-time assistant coach William H. Lewis rejected the proposal. Lewis argued that Cranston's undergraduate coaching system would result in "the blind leading the blind," and suggested that universities might then also consider doing away with professors and tutors, leaving college students to go to school and "dig for themselves."

Cranston drew further attention in late 1905 when he published a further article in the Boston Journal opining that athletics were being overdone at universities. Under the headline, "Wishes He Had Not Been a Famous Athlete When In College," Cranston wrote:

"I have had several serious sicknesses since I left college which I attribute to the great strain of my athletic training. On the whole I can't say that athletics have benefitted me any in my business career. I sincerely believe I would have been better off in my life since college if I had left athletics alone. ... I've never received any benefit in business life from athletics. I am not a broken down man by any means, but I only speak the truth when I say I should have been better off had I left athletics alone."

== Head coaching record ==
Year	Team	Overall	Conference	Standing	Bowl/playoffs
Harvard Crimson (Independent) (1903)
1903	Harvard	9–3			
Harvard:		9–3			
Total:		9–3			
