= Hector Cowan =

American football player, coach, and minister (1863–1941)

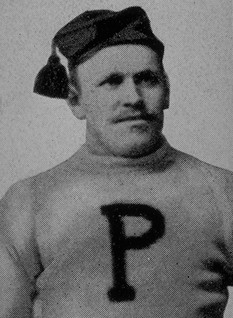
- Cowan at Princeton during his playing years

Biographical details
- Born: July 12, 1863; Hobart, New York, U.S.
- Died: October 19, 1941 (aged 78); Stamford, New York, U.S.

Playing career
- 1885–1889: Princeton
- Position: Tackle

Coaching career (HC unless noted)
- 1888: North Carolina
- 1894–1896: Kansas

Head coaching record
- Overall: 18–8–1

Accomplishments and honors

Championships
- 1 WIUFA (1895)

Awards
- First-team All-American (1889)
- College Football Hall of Fame; Inducted in 1951 (profile)

Hector William "Hec" Cowan (July 12, 1863 – October 19, 1941) was an American college football player and coach, and an ordained Presbyterian minister. He played football at Princeton University from 1885 to 1889. He was team captain for Princeton and selected to the first College Football All-America team in 1889. Cowan served as the head football coach at the University of North Carolina at Chapel Hill for Carolina's two games in the spring of 1889, and at the University of Kansas from 1894 to 1896, compiling a career coaching record of 18–8–1. He was inducted into the College Football Hall of Fame as a player in 1951.

== Playing career ==
Cowan played football for the Princeton Tigers from 1885 to 1889. While at Princeton, he had several games against Pudge Heffelfinger of Yale who said Cowan had "the strongest shoulders and arms I've ever been up against and his stubby legs drove like pistons when he carried the ball..."

The 1885 season was notable for one of the most celebrated football plays of the 19th century - a 90-yard punt return by Henry "Tillie" Lamar of Princeton in the closing minutes of the game against Yale. In 1889, Princeton was national champion as in '85, and Cowan was selected for the inaugural All-America team.

== Coaching career ==
=== North Carolina ===
Cowan was the head football coach at North Carolina for the last two games in their inaugural season of 1888 (i.e. 1889 calendar year). He was the school's first paid coach, and changed the style of play in that section in his two weeks spent training the team.

=== Ministry ===
After Cowan left Princeton in 1889 he became an ordained Presbyterian minister at Hope Presbyterian church in St. Joseph, Missouri, in 1891. While there the chancellor at the University of Kansas, Francis H. Snow, began making contact with him in an effort to convince him to come to KU and become the new head football coach. KU's first head football coach, E.M. Hopkins aided in the effort as he was a classmate with Cowan back at Princeton. Cowan was seen as a premiere football coach at the time despite only having coached a few games previously, but he also wanted to continue his ministerial pursuits and made one of his conditions on coming to KU that he be made chapel director at the university as well as professor of physical culture. In addition chancellor Snow promised Cowan a 1-year salary of $1,000 if he were to accept the offer from KU.

=== Kansas ===
Cowan was the fourth head football coach at the University of Kansas in Lawrence, Kansas, and he held that position for three seasons, from 1894 until 1896. There he coached John H. Outland and future Kansas head football coach, A. R. Kennedy. His overall coaching record at Kansas was 15–7–1.

In February 1894 Cowan agreed to the terms laid out and his $1,000 salary was raised with $400 in donations coming from the faculty at Kansas and the remaining $600 coming from a citizens committee in conjunction with area businessmen interested in athletics. Cowan arrived at KU on March 1, 1894, and thus became the first paid head football coach in KU history. As a result of him being an ordained Presbyterian minister and his title of chapel director while at KU he was often referred to as Reverend Hector W. Cowan.

== Later life and death ==
Cowan left his job as head coach at Kansas in 1896, but remained as chapel director, and professor of physical culture for 2 more years. Cowan later was replaced in his positions of chapel director and professor of physical culture at KU by Dr. James Naismith in 1898. He moved from Lawrence, Kansas, to Spring Hill, Kansas, in the summer of 1898 to become the minister of the local Presbyterian church there. In 1905 Cowan moved back to just outside Stamford, New York, to take over his parents' dairy farm. He worked the remainder of his life as a dairy farmer from this point on. Cowan returned to KU several times over the years to visit his former players and friends, and was an honored guest of the University of Kansas athletic association at the 1925 Kansas Relays.

=== Death ===
Hector died on October 19, 1941, on his farm in Delaware County, New York. He was survived by his wife, Anna Louise Smith (November 3, 1864 – October 20, 1945), four sons, Hector Edmund Cowan (July 2, 1893 – January 2, 1974), Walter Griffen Cowan (June 26, 1895 – July 28, 1982), John Mark Cowan (April 26, 1900 – June 16, 1978) and William Howard Cowan (May 9, 1908 – August 1, 2002), and 3 daughters, Mrs. Helen Louise Leete (August 2, 1897 – September 29, 1992), Mrs. Frances Petit Beddow (November 25, 1901 – July 8, 1998), and Mrs. Annie Smith Turnbull (August 9, 1905 – April 18, 1990).

== Head coaching record ==
Year	Team	Overall	Conference	Standing
North Carolina Tar Heels (Independent) (1888)
1888	North Carolina	1–1 (Note: Cowan was the coach for the third and fourth games of the season. North Carolina had no coach for their first two games in 1888)		
North Carolina:		1–1		
Kansas Jayhawks (Western Interstate University Football Association) (1894–1896)
1894	Kansas	4–3–1	1–2	T–3rd
1895	Kansas	6–1	2–1	T–1st
1896	Kansas	7–3	2–1	2nd
Kansas:		17–7–1	5–4	
Total:		18–8–1		
