= End (gridiron football) =

North American football position

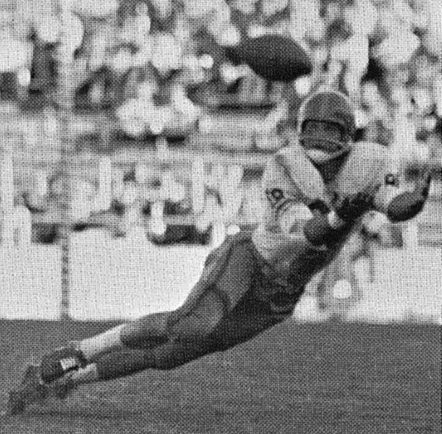
Mike Ditka catching a pass as an end at Pitt

In gridiron football, an end is a player who lines up at either end of the line of scrimmage, usually beside the tackles. Rules state that a legal offensive formation must always consist of seven players on the line of scrimmage and that the player on each end of the line is an eligible receiver who can catch forward passes. There are two types on offense: the split end, or wide out, and the tight end. On defense, the position name survives in the name of the defensive end; in function, this position no longer corresponds to its offensive counterparts, which are defended more commonly by the linebacker against the tight end and the cornerback against the split end.

It is also used in terminology such as an end run.

== History ==
Before the advent of two platoons, in which teams fielded distinct defensive and offensive units, players that lined up on the ends of the line on both offense and defense were referred to simply as "ends". The position was used in this sense until roughly the 1960s.

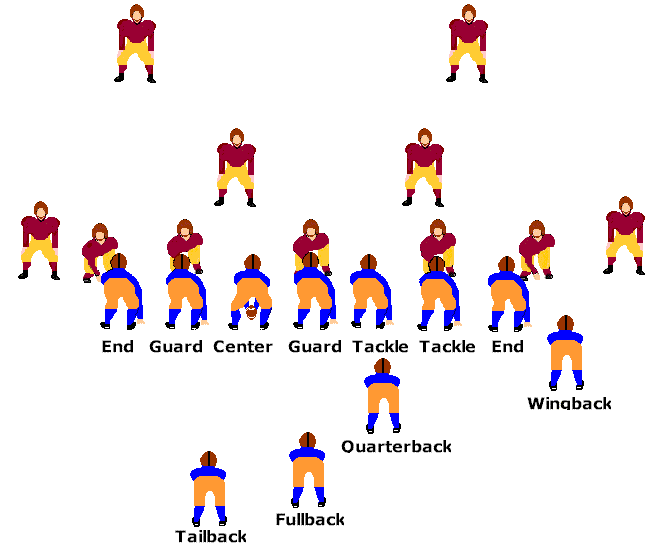
The old single wing formation showing ends labeled

On offense, an end who lines up close to the other linemen is known as a tight end and is the only lineman who aside from blocking can run or catch passes. One who lines up some distance from the offensive line is known as a split end. In recent years and the proliferation of the forward pass, the term wide receiver covers both split ends and flankers (wide receivers who line up in split positions but behind the line of scrimmage). The terms "split end" and "flanker" are often replaced today with terms like "X" and "Z" receivers. Bill Carpenter was the first "Lonesome end".

On defense, there is a commonly used position called the defensive end or, more commonly in the 21st century, the edge rusher. Its primary role is to rush the passer, as well as to stop offensive runs to the outer edges of the line of scrimmage (most often referred to as "containment"). However, as there are no rules regulating the formation of the defense, players at this position commonly take on and share multiple roles with other positions in different defensive schemes. The defensive counterpart to the split end is the cornerback, which, despite its name, usually lines up on or near the line of scrimmage and is technically an end.

== Greats ==
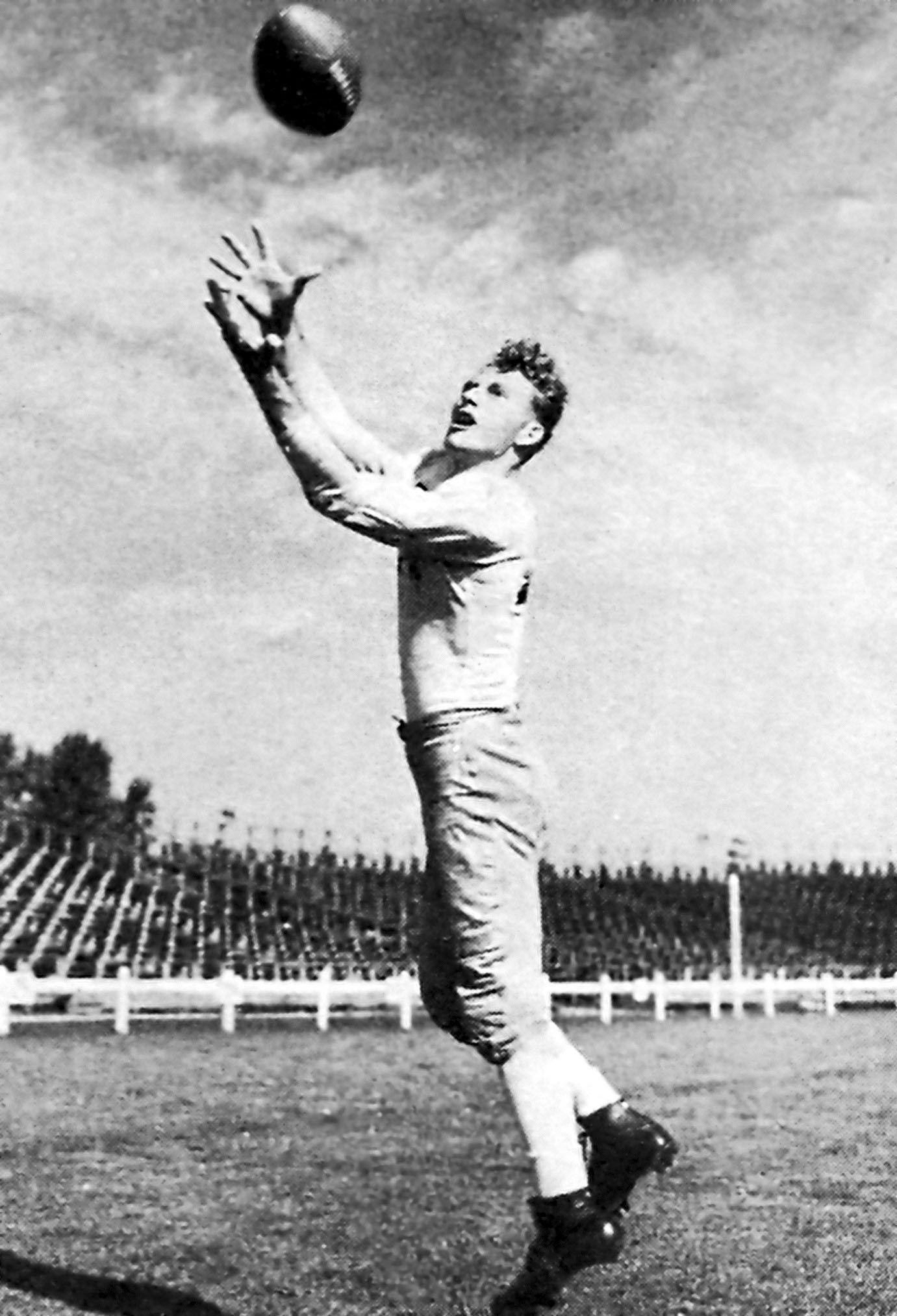
Don Hutson catches a pass.

Don Hutson of the Alabama Crimson Tide and the Green Bay Packers is considered one of the sport's greatest at the end position. The self-described "other end" opposite Hutson in college at Alabama was legendary coach Bear Bryant. Gaynell Tinsley was another prominent end of Hutson's time. Amos Alonzo Stagg of Yale and Arthur Cumnock of Harvard were ends on the first All-America team. Stagg went on to a Hall of Fame coaching career; some called Cumnock "the greatest Harvard player of all time." Mike Ditka and Ron Sellers were some of the last to play the position in college.

== See also ==
- Glossary of American football
- History of American football positions
- Tight end
- Defensive end
- Wide receiver
