= Bernard Trafford =

American athlete and banker (1871–1942)

- At Harvard, c. 1893
- Born: Bernard Walton Trafford; July 2, 1871; Dartmouth, Massachusetts, U.S.
- Died: January 3, 1942 (aged 70); Milton, Massachusetts, U.S.
- Occupation: Banker
- Football career

Harvard Crimson
- Position: Fullback
- Class: 1893

Career information
- High school: Fall River, Exeter (1888)
- College: Harvard (1889–1892)

Awards and highlights
- National championship (1890); NCAA points leader (1891)

Bernard Walton Trafford (July 2, 1871 – January 3, 1942) was an American banker and college football player. As a football player for the Harvard Crimson football, he was on the national championship team in 1890 and led the nation in scoring in 1891.

== Early life ==
Trafford was born July 2, 1871, in Dartmouth, Massachusetts. His parents were Rachel Mott (née Davis) and William Bradford Trafford.

Trafford attended high school in Fall River, Massachusetts. He graduated from Phillips Exeter Academy in 1889. He graduated Harvard University in 1893. While at Harvard, he was a member of Delta Kappa Epsilon (aka The Dickey Club).

Trafford was a prominent fullback for the Harvard Crimson football team from 1889 to 1892, captain of the 1891 and 1892 teams. He kicked five field goals in a game against Cornell in 1890, a season in which Harvard was national champion. Trafford scored 64 points in a game against Wesleyan in 1891, and led the nation in scoring that year with 270 points. Trafford helped coach the 1893 team.

== Career ==
c. 1918

After college, Trafford was employed at Bell Telephone System. He was the vice president of the First National Bank of Boston from 1912 to 1923, then became president in March 1928 upon the death of Clifton H. Dwinnell. He served as vice chairman of the bank's board from 1929 to 1935, and chairman from 1935 until his retirement.

== Personal life ==
He married Leonora Brooks Borden of Fall River on June 5, 1901. They had four daughters and a son. Leonora died in 1936. Trafford died on January 3, 1943 in Milton, Massachusetts.
