= Roscoe Channing =

American football player (1868–1961)

Profile
- Position: Halfback

Personal information
- Born: January 7, 1868; New York City, U.S.
- Died: April 1, 1961 (aged 93); Tucson, Arizona, U.S.
- Listed weight: 141 lb (64 kg)

Career information
- College: Princeton (1889)

Awards and highlights
- Consensus All-American (1889)

Roscoe H. Channing, Jr. (January 7, 1868 – April 1, 1961) was an All-American football player, member of the Rough Riders and mining executive. Channing was an All-American halfback for Princeton University. He was one of eleven players selected by Caspar Whitney for the first ever All-America college football team in 1889. When the Spanish–American War commenced in 1898, Channing enlisted in Theodore Roosevelt's Rough Riders. Roosevelt took pride in how many Ivy League football players enlisted in the Rough Riders. Channing later went into the mining business and managed the mining operations of the Whitney family. In the 1920s, he formed a partnership with his friend Cornelius Vanderbilt Whitney. The two formed the Hudson Bay Mining and Smelting Company in Flin Flon, Saskatchewan, Canada, and Channing served as the company's President. Channing died in 1961.
