= Joshua Damon Upton =

American football player and coach (1870–1964)

- c. 1918

Biographical details
- Born: June 17, 1870; North Reading, Massachusetts, U.S.
- Died: November 20, 1964 (aged 94); Marblehead, Massachusetts, U.S.

Playing career
- 1889–1893: Harvard
- Position: Tackle

Coaching career (HC unless noted)
- 1897–1898: Tufts

Head coaching record
- Overall: 7–16

Joshua Damon Upton (June 17, 1870 – November 20, 1964) was an American college football player and coach. He served as the head football coach at Tufts University from 1897 to 1898, compiling a record of 7–16.

== Biography ==
At Harvard, c. 1893

Joshua Damon Upton was born in North Reading, Massachusetts on June 17, 1870.

He married Edith Balch in Brookline on October 23, 1901, and they had three children.

After football, he practiced law in Boston.

He died on November 20, 1964, at Mary Alley Hospital in Marblehead.

== Head coaching record ==
Year	Team	Overall	Conference	Standing	Bowl/playoffs
Tufts Jumbos (Independent) (1897–1898)
1897	Tufts	6–7			
1898	Tufts	1–9			
Tufts:		7–16			
Total:		7–16			
