= William George (American football) =

American football center

Profile
- Position: Center

Career information
- College: Princeton (1889)

Awards and highlights
- Consensus All-American (1889)

William J. "Pop" George was an All-American football player at Princeton University. He was a four-year starter at Princeton from 1886 to 1889, during which time the 1886 and 1889 teams won national championships and compiled an overall record of 35-3-2. He was selected as the center on the first college football All-America team in 1889. He played college football for Princeton until age 28, while enrolled in graduate studies.

In the 1889 Princeton-Yale game, George was sustained an injury to his knee cap and "had the tendon of his ankle broken." George was taken from the game to Murray Hill Hotel in an ambulance.

In 1920, he was selected to the all-time Princeton football team by Herring of the Princeton Alumni Weekly.
