= James P. Lee =

American football player and lawyer (1870–1941)

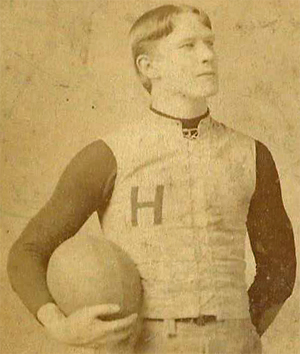

Harvard Crimson
- Position: Halfback

Personal information
- Born: June 6, 1870; New York City, New York, U.S.
- Died: September 14, 1941 (aged 71); Southampton, New York, U.S.

Career information
- College: Harvard (1889–1890); Columbia

Awards and highlights
- Consensus All-American (1889)

James Parrish Lee (June 6, 1870 – September 14, 1941) was an American college football player, track and field athlete, and lawyer. He played college football at Harvard University and was a consensus selection at the halfback position on the 1889 All-America college football team.

== Early years and ancestry ==
Lee was born in New York City in 1870. His father Charles Carroll Lee, was a Union Army surgeon in the American Civil War and later president of the Medical Society of New York County. He was a cousin of Robert E. Lee and a descendant of Richard Lee I and Charles Carroll of Carrollton.

== Athletics ==
Lee attended Harvard College where he was a member of the Harvard Crimson football team. He was a consensus first-team selection at the halfback position for the 1889 College Football All-America Team. The following year, he led the 1890 Harvard Crimson football team to an undefeated 11–0 record. Lee capped the 1890 season with a long touchdown run to give Harvard its first victory since 1876 in the Harvard–Yale football rivalry. The New York Times described Lee's touchdown run as "a brilliant open play" around the right end of the line.

Lee was also a member of Harvard's track team, competing in the 220-yard dash, the quarter mile and the low hurdles. He set a world record in the low hurdles. He continued to compete in track while he was a student at Columbia Law School and as a member of the New York Athletic Club.

== Later years and death ==
After receiving his LL.B. degree from Columbia, Lee practiced law with the New York firm of Anderson, Pendleton & Anderson. He was also an officer of Hecker Cereal Company, Southwestern Milling Company and Standard Milling Company. He was married to Clara Lothrop Lincoln in 1896, and they had six children.

Lee died in 1941 at the age of 71 while playing tennis at the Meadow Club in Southampton, New York. While playing tennis with his son-in-law and "was about to serve and had called the score, 'thirty love,' when he coughed and staggered." He was dead by the time his son-in-law reached him from the other side of the net.
