= Arthur Cumnock =

American football player (1868–1930)

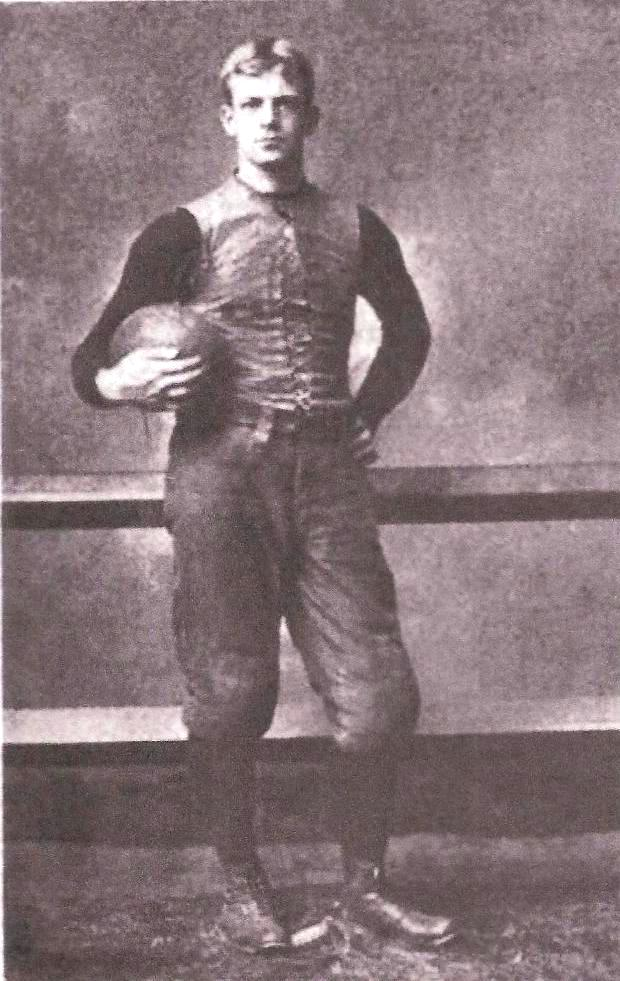
- Portrait of Cumnock from Walter Camp's 1894 book "American Football"

Profile
- Position: End

Personal information
- Born: February 12, 1868; Danielson, Connecticut, U.S.
- Died: June 8, 1930 (aged 62); New York, New York, U.S.

Career information
- College: Harvard (1889–1890)

Awards and highlights
- All-American (1889)

Arthur James Cumnock (February 12, 1868 – June 8, 1930) was an American college football player. He and Amos Alonzo Stagg were selected as the ends on the first All-America team in 1889. Cumnock invented the first nose guard. He is also credited with developing the tradition of spring practice in football; in March 1889, Cumnock led the Harvard team in drills on Jarvis field, which is considered the first-ever spring football practice.

== Harvard University ==
In 1913, an article in an Eastern newspaper sought to choose the greatest Harvard football player of all time. The individual chosen was Cumnock, who "the sons of John Harvard are pretty well agreed" was "the greatest Harvard player of all time." The article continued:

"But in sizing them all up there still remains one whom Harvard graduates and students regard with the greatest veneration, not so much for his actual individual performances, although he was one of the best, but for those sterling qualities which go to make up a tactician, a Hannibal of the gridiron, one whose real object in life was to develop a team that could and did beat Yale--Arthur V. Cumnock, captain of the team of 1890."

After being selected as an All-American in 1889, Cumnock was also named captain of the 1890 Harvard football team. Cumnock led Harvard to an upset against the heavily favored Yale team that year. In describing Cumock's determination as a team leader, the author of the 1913 article wrote: "He permitted no one to interfere with his plans. For ten weeks he spent his time trying to convince his more or less skeptical team mates that Yale could be beaten." As for his individual performance in the 1890 Yale game, the writer noted: "Such tackling as Cumnock did that day probably has never been equaled. He played a star offensive game, but on the defensive he was a terror. Lee McClung would come around the end with the giant Heffelfinger interfering, and the records read: 'Cumnock tackles both and brings them down.'" Harvard won the game 12 to 6 in what was considered "one of the greatest games in Harvard's history."

== Later life and death ==
Cumnock graduated from Harvard in 1891 and went into the cotton mill business. He became the treasurer of one of the largest corporations in New England. Cumnock died on June 8, 1930.
