= 1889 All-America college football team =

Official list of the best college football players of 1890

The 1889 All-America college football team was the first All-America college football team. The team was selected by Caspar Whitney and published in This Week's Sports.

The team selected by Whitney in 1889 marked the origin of the "All-America" teams that have since been picked in many collegiate sports. All eleven members of the 1889 All-America team played for either Harvard, Princeton, or Yale, then known as the "Big Three" of college football. Some sources indicate that Walter Camp assisted Whitney with the selection of the 1889 All-American team, while others indicate that Camp did not become involved in the selection process until some time in the 1890s.

The first All-America team included Amos Alonzo Stagg (then a player for Yale), Pudge Heffelfinger (who later became the first professional football player), "Snake" Ames (who set a college scoring record with 730 points), Edgar Allan Poe (second cousin, twice removed of the writer of the same name), Arthur Cumnock (described as the greatest Harvard football player of all time in 1913), and Roscoe Channing (who later served with Theodore Roosevelt in the Rough Riders).

== Profiles of the 1889 All-America eleven ==
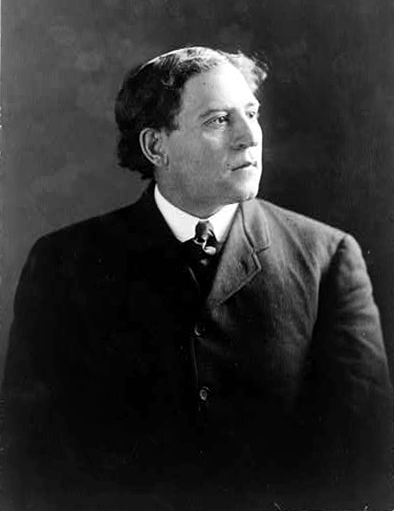
Yale end Amos Alonzo Stagg went on to become one of the sport's most successful coaches.

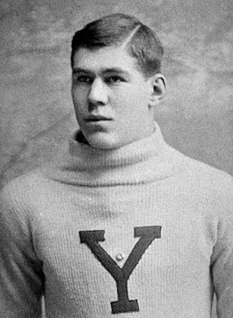
Yale guard Pudge Heffelfinger became the first professional football player in 1892.

- Amos Alonzo Stagg (1862–1965): Yale's All-American end, Stagg became football coach at the University of Chicago from 1892 to 1932 and the University of the Pacific from 1933 to 1946.
- Pudge Heffelfinger (1867–1954): Yale's guard, "Pudge" Heffelfinger was a native of Minnesota who was considered the greatest lineman of his time. Heffelfinger was paid $500 in 1892 to play for the Allegheny Athletic Association, making him the first professional football player. He was one of the charter inductees into the College Football Hall of Fame.
- Knowlton Ames (1868–1931): A native of Chicago, Princeton's All-America fullback "Snake" Ames set an unofficial collegiate scoring record in his time with 730 points, including 62 touchdowns and 176 points after touchdown. Ames is credited with being the first player to execute a fake punt and part of the first team to fully develop the "power sweep." Ames moved west to coach Purdue University from 1891 to 1892.
- Hector Cowan (1863–1941): Princeton's tackle, "Hec" Cowan helped lead the 1889 Princeton team to a perfect 10–0 record. Pudge Heffelfinger later said of Cowan, "He had the strongest shoulders and arms I've ever been up against and his stubby legs drove like pistons when he carried the ball. Hector could carry a couple of tacklers on his back, yet he was plenty fast in the open." He later served as the coach at the University of Kansas from 1894 to 1896.
- Edgar Allan Poe (1871–1961): Princeton's quarterback, Poe was named after his relative and celebrated poet Edgar Allan Poe. After Princeton beat Harvard, 41–15, a Harvard man reportedly asked a Princeton alumnus whether Poe was related to the great Edgar Allan Poe. According to the story, "the alumnus looked at him in astonishment and replied, 'He is the great Edgar Allan Poe.'" Poe graduated Phi Beta Kappa and later served as the Attorney General of the State of Maryland from 1911 to 1915.
- Arthur Cumnock (1868–1930): Harvard's Cumnock was known as a fierce tackler and has been ranked by one author as perhaps the greatest player in that school's long football tradition. Cumnock later went into the cotton mill business and was the treasurer of one of the largest corporations in New England.
- Roscoe Channing (1868–1961): Princeton's halfback Channing later served with Theodore Roosevelt's Rough Riders in the Spanish–American War. For many years, he was the President of Hudson Bay Mining and Smelting Company, a copper mining company in Flin Flon, Saskatchewan, Canada.
- Charles O. Gill (1868–1959): Yale's Gill later coached football at California in 1894, and at New Hampshire in 1908.

== Team lineup by position ==
Ends

- Amos Alonzo Stagg, Yale (College Football Hall of Fame)
- Arthur Cumnock, Harvard

Tackles

- Hector Cowan, Princeton (College Football Hall of Fame)
- Charles O. Gill, Yale

Princeton fullback "Snake" Ames set an unofficial collegiate scoring record with 730 points, including 62 touchdowns and 176 goals after touchdown.

Guards

- Pudge Heffelfinger, Yale (College Football Hall of Fame)
- John Cranston, Harvard

Center

- William George, Princeton

Quarterback

- Edgar Allan Poe, Princeton

Halfbacks

- Roscoe Channing, Princeton
- James P. Lee, Harvard

Fullback

- Knowlton Ames, Princeton (College Football Hall of Fame)

== Gallery of 1889 All-Americans ==
Roscoe Channing

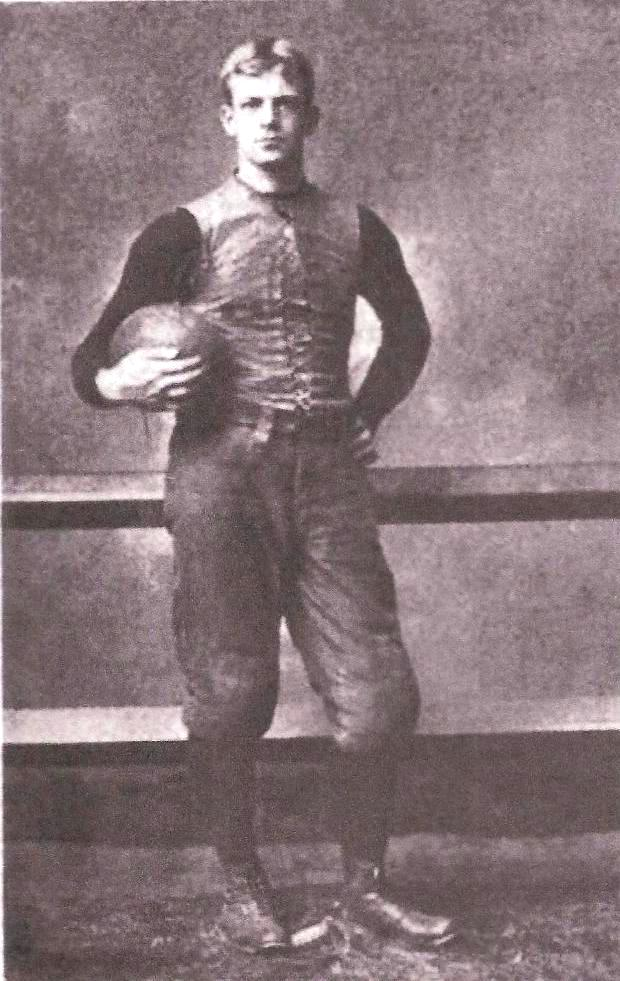
Arthur Cumnock

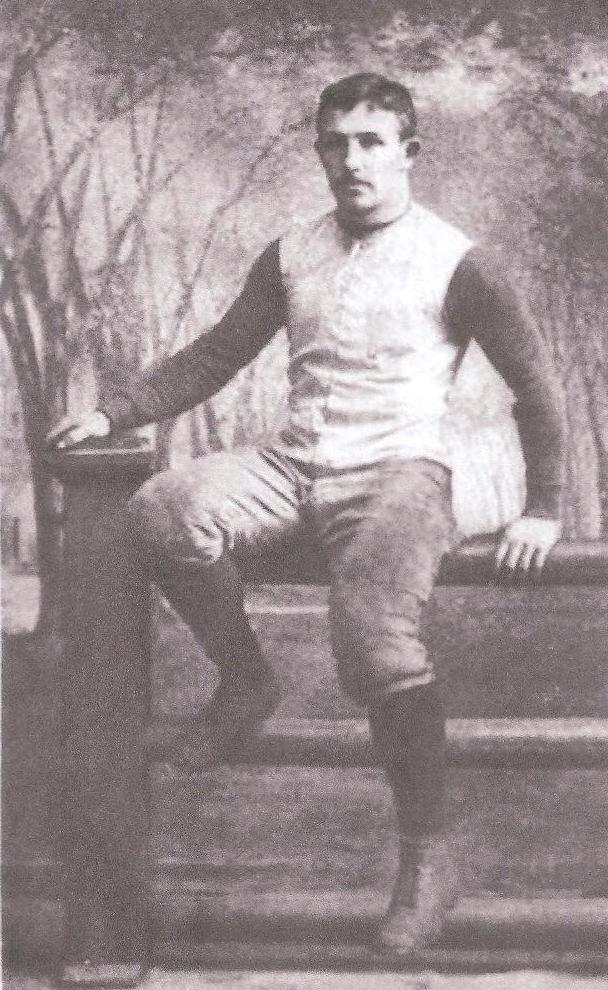
Charles Gill

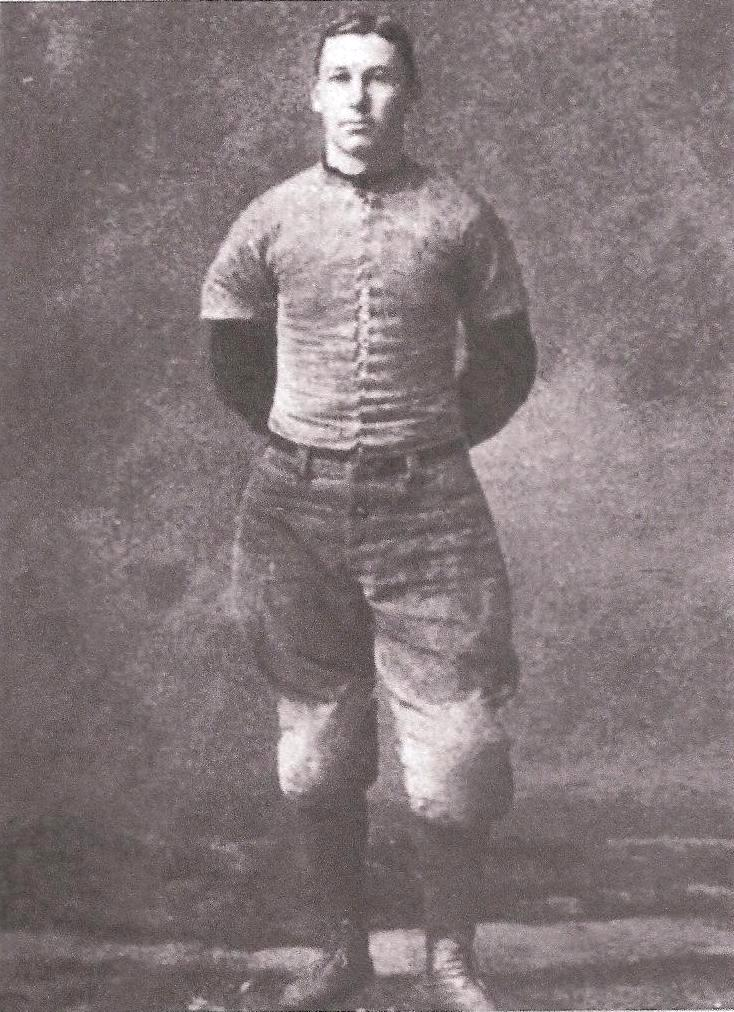
John Corbett

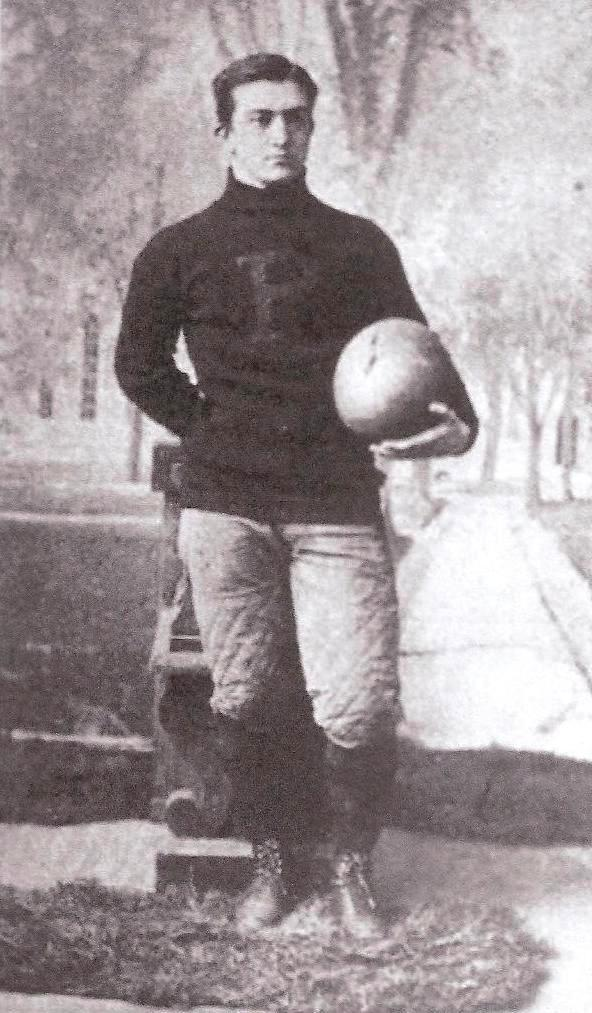
Edgar Allan Poe

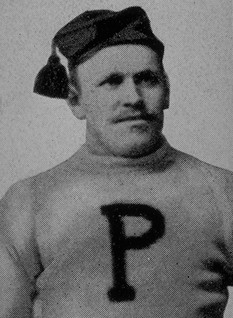
Hector Cowan

== Substitutes ==
Whitney additionally selected eight substitutes, divided into "in the line" and "behind the line" categories:

In the line

- Hugh Janeway, Princeton
- Hiland Orlando Stickney, Harvard
- Ben "Sport" Donnelly, Princeton
- William Rhodes, Yale

Behind the line

- Dudley Dean, Harvard
- Bernard Trafford, Harvard
- Jerry Black, Princeton
- Herbert McBride, Yale
