= University Athletic Grounds =

Former athletic field in Philadelphia

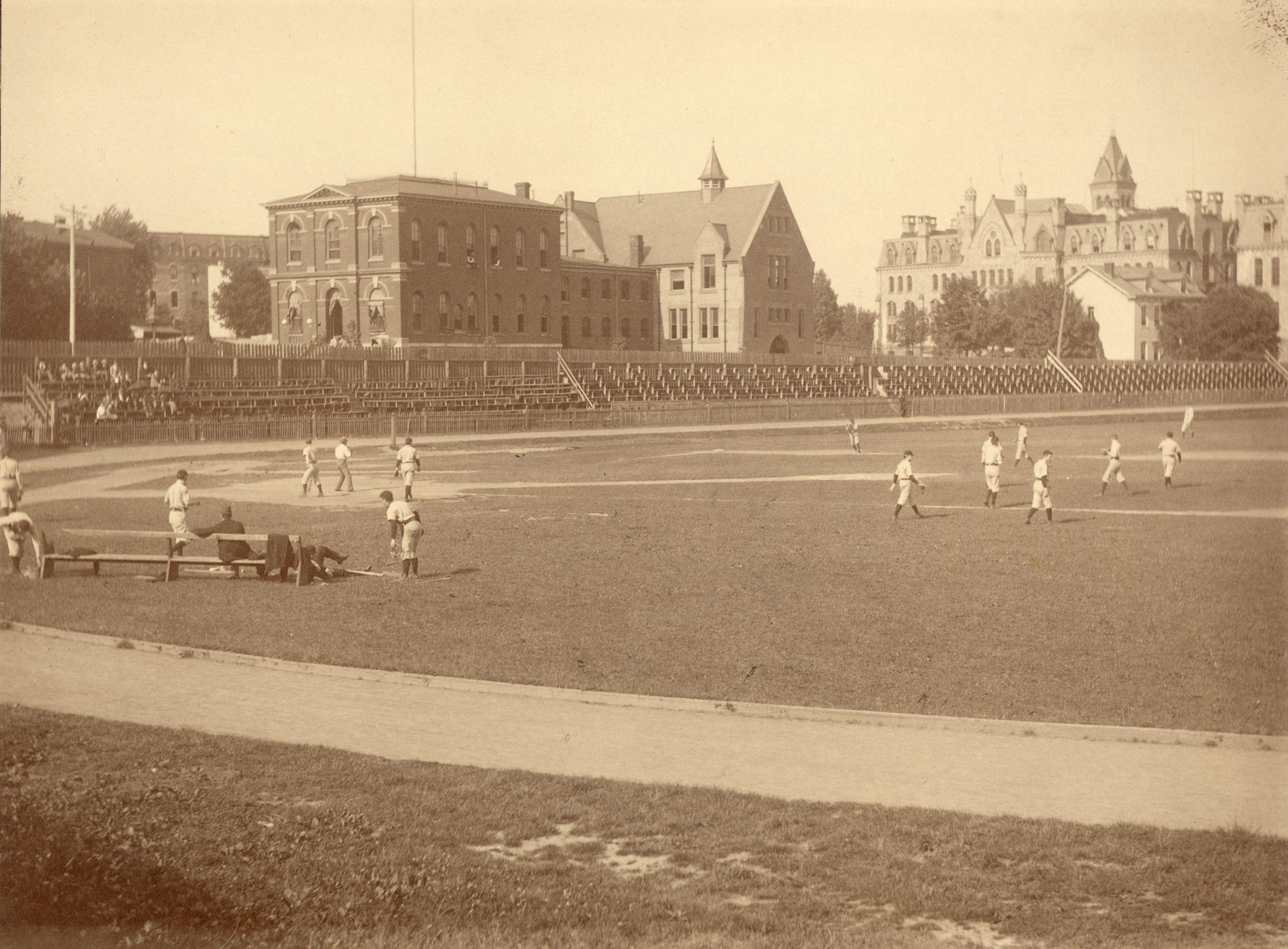
- Penn Baseball practices at University Athletic Grounds in 1891
- Interactive map of University Athletic Grounds
- Address: 37th and Spruce Streets; Philadelphia
- Coordinates: 39°57′2.9″N 75°11′50.3″W
- Owner: University of Pennsylvania
- Operator: University of Pennsylvania Athletic Association
- Surface: Grass
- Record attendance: 20,000 (1894)

Construction
- Opened: May 11, 1885
- Closed: 1895

Tenants
- Penn Quakers (Football) 1885-1894; Penn Quakers (Baseball) 1885-1895

The University Athletic Grounds, often referred to by its location as Thirty-seventh and Spruce Streets was the University of Pennsylvania's athletic field and home to Penn's football and baseball teams, track and field, and club sports between 1885 and 1894. The Athletic Grounds were located at 37th and Spruce Streets on Penn's campus on what is now the Quad dormitories. Franklin Field opened in 1895 and became the home of Penn's outdoor teams and athletics.

== History ==
The university had moved from Center City Philadelphia across the Schuylkill River to West Philadelphia in 1872. The university's growth along with the post-Civil War increase in interest in athletics led to the 1873 formation of Penn's student Athletic Association to address questions of organization and funding which had until then been an exclusively undergraduate initiative without the financial support of alumni or the university. Penn's football team had until then played at off campus fields; from 1882 to 1884, Penn football played its Philadelphia games at Recreation Park, the first home of the Philadelphia Phillies at 24th St and Columbia Avenue.

Recognizing the rising interest in athletics, alumni, led by John C. Sims, worked with Provost William Pepper and the university trustees to provide land for an athletic field. In March 1883, the Athletic Association had raised $8,500, and in 1884 raised another $6,500. In May 1883, university trustees approved the use of the parcel between 36th and 37th, Pine and Spruce Streets for athletics.

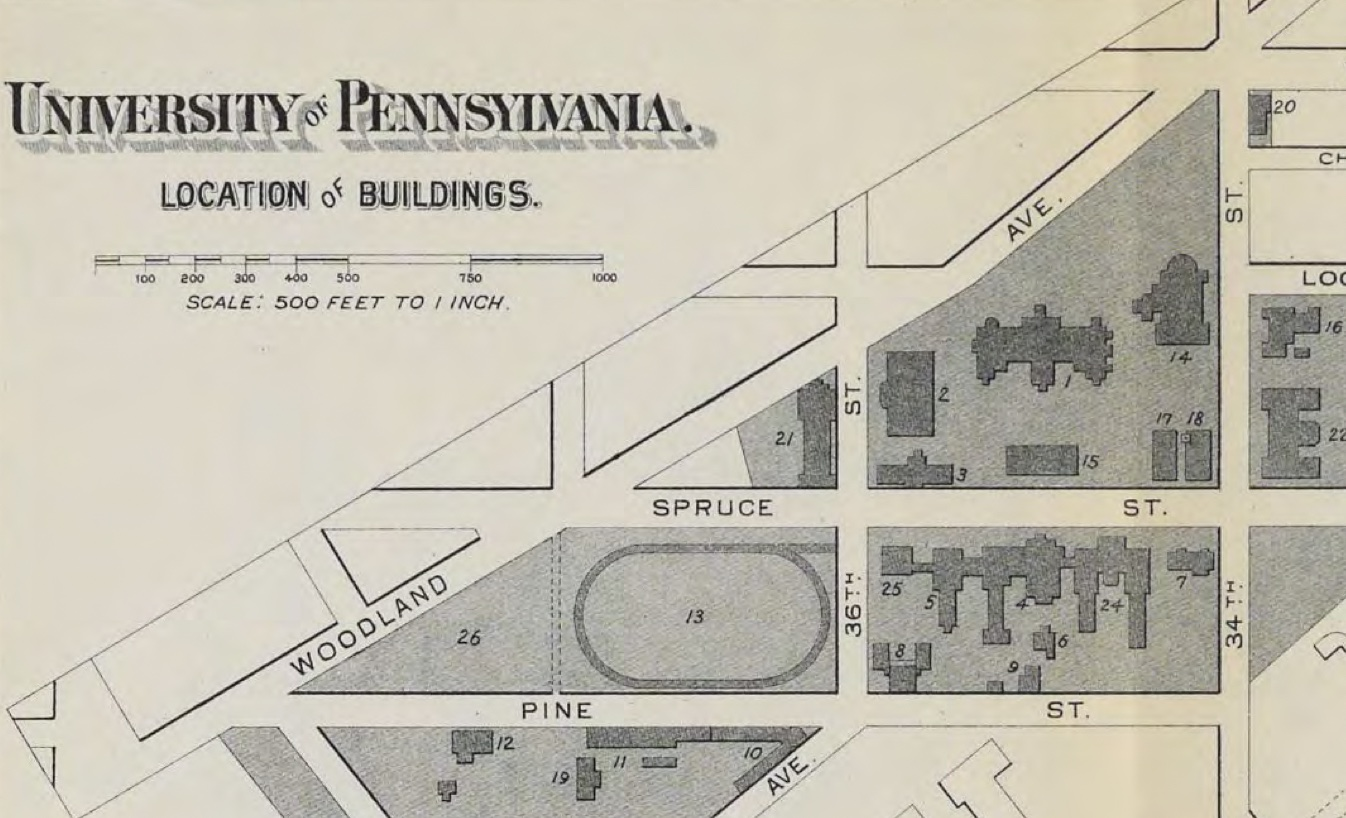
University of Pennsylvania, Athletic Grounds, building No. 13 with oval track (1894)

On May 7, 1885, it was reported in the Philadelphia Inquirer that "the new grounds of the University Athletic Association" would be ready for use by May 9, 1885. Penn opened the new field with a day of intracollegiate track and field events including a 100-yard dash, running high jump, tug of war, 220-yard dash, and other field events on May 14, 1885. Penn's baseball team was immediately scheduled for the new field with all games starting at 4pm in May and June 1885.

The field was designated for use by the football, baseball, and cricket teams, as well as for tennis, and track and field matches - those between University teams and outside clubs, as well as competition between classes of the university which held regular intra-class competitions.

On November 5, 1887, Princeton routed Penn 95 to 0 before a large crowd at the Athletic Grounds. The Penn regulars were unable to play and Princeton overwhelmed the team of substitutes.

The use of a dedicated scoreboard for football was introduced at the University Athletic Grounds in 1893 by Arthur Irwin, Penn's superintendent of physical culture and a longtime Major League Baseball player and manager. Irwin developed the basics of the first football scoreboard, applied for a U.S. patent in 1895, and the innovation was promoted as the Irwin Score Board.

On August 6, 1894, a fire broke out at the Phillies' Philadelphia Ball Park which reduced the ballpark to charred wood and ashes. While building crews worked around the clock erecting temporary bleachers, the Phillies played six games at the University Athletic Grounds, winning five of them. Their only loss was a 13 to 7 game against Louisville on August 14, 1894, in front of 2,200 fans. Their final game at the Penn Athletic Grounds came on August 17, 1894, in which the Phillies crushed Louisville 29 to 4. Sam Thompson went for 6 for 7 at bat including a "home run which bounded over the fence from the bicycle track in right center." Admission to Phillies games at the Athletic Grounds was 25 cents.

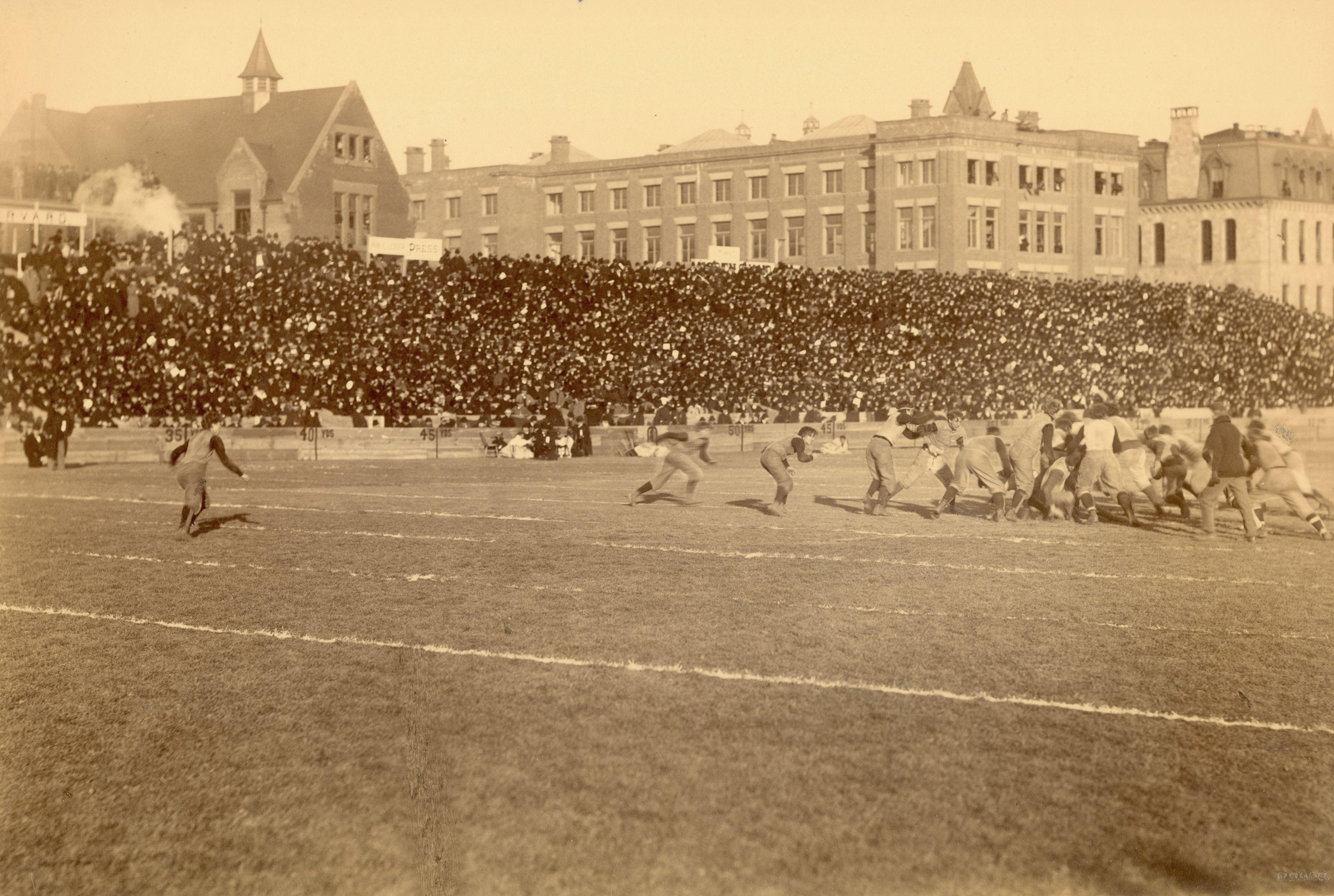
Pennsylvania-Harvard at University Athletic Grounds (November 29, 1894)

One of the largest crowds to see a game at the Athletic Grounds was on November 29, 1894; temporary stands were erected and 20,000 fans filled the ballpark to see Penn defeat Harvard 18–4.

The Penn Quakers baseball team was scheduled to open their 1895 season at the new Franklin Field however the new field was too muddy. Penn would face Lafayette on May 1, 1895, at the "old Athletic Grounds" before moving to Franklin Field for the rest of the season. Likewise Penn Quaker football utilized the Thirty-seventh street grounds for practice in October 1895.

The University Athletic Grounds hosted the "Spring Handicap", the precursor to the Penn Relays. The University of Pennsylvania Track and Field committee created and introduced a relay race to the 1893 meet which became the 4 × 400 m relay. During the 1893 spring handicapped track meet, the University of Pennsylvania and Princeton University men ran a relay race against each other. The Princeton men won with a time of 3:34, beating the University of Pennsylvania (Penn) by 8 yards. In 1894, Penn hosted the track and field meet at 37th and Spruce Streets on April 21, 1894.

Franklin Field would be built and dedicated on April 20, 1895, for the first running of the Penn Relays. The University Athletic Grounds parcel was subsequently developed for student housing. The first building that would come to constitute the Quadrangle dormitory buildings was erected in 1894 between Spruce and Pine Streets. While the area was being developed, the field continued to be used for athletics. Penn State practiced in Philadelphia on the former athletic grounds prior to their October 7, 1899 game against Army at West Point.
