= 1888 Lafayette football team =

American college football season

1888 Lafayette football
- Conference: Independent
- Record: 6–3
- Head coach: None
- Captain: Everett B. Camp

1888 Eastern college football independents records
	Conf.			Overall
Team	W	L	T	W		L		T
Yale		–		13	–	0	–	0
Harvard		–		12	–	1	–	0
Princeton		–		11	–	1	–	0
Lehigh		–		10	–	2	–	0
Trinity (CT)		–		5	–	1	–	1
Lafayette		–		6	–	3	–	0
Cornell		–		4	–	2	–	0
Penn		–		9	–	7	–	0
Bucknell		–		2	–	3	–	0
Fordham		–		1	–	2	–	0
Massachusetts		–		2	–	4	–	0
Wesleyan		–		2	–	7	–	0
Worcester Tech		–		1	–	4	–	0
Rutgers		–		1	–	6	–	1
Penn State		–		0	–	2	–	1
Swarthmore		–		0	–	5	–	0

The 1888 Lafayette football team was an American football team that represented Lafayette College as an independent during the 1888 college football season. Playing without a regular coach, the team compiled a 6–3 record and outscored opponents by a total of 141 to 67. Everett B. Camp was the team captain, and H. Fay was the manager. The team played its home games on The Quad in Easton, Pennsylvania.

== Schedule ==
Date	Time	Opponent	Site	Result	Source
October 10		Bucknell	The Quad; Easton, PA	W 54–0	
October 13		at Swarthmore	Swarthmore, PA	W 18–0	
October 20		at Rutgers	College Field; New Brunswick, NJ	W 4–0	
October 27		at Haverford	Haverford, PA	W 18–0	
November 7		Penn	The Quad; Easton, PA	W 12–6	
November 10		at Cornell	Ithaca, NY	W 16–0	
November 17		Lehigh	The Quad; Easton, PA (rivalry)	L 4–6	
November 21	3:00 p.m.	at Penn	University Athletic Grounds; Philadelphia, PA	L 0–50	
November 27		at Lehigh	Bethlehem, PA	L 0–16	
