= 1888 Yale Bulldogs football team =

American college football season

1888 Yale Bulldogs football
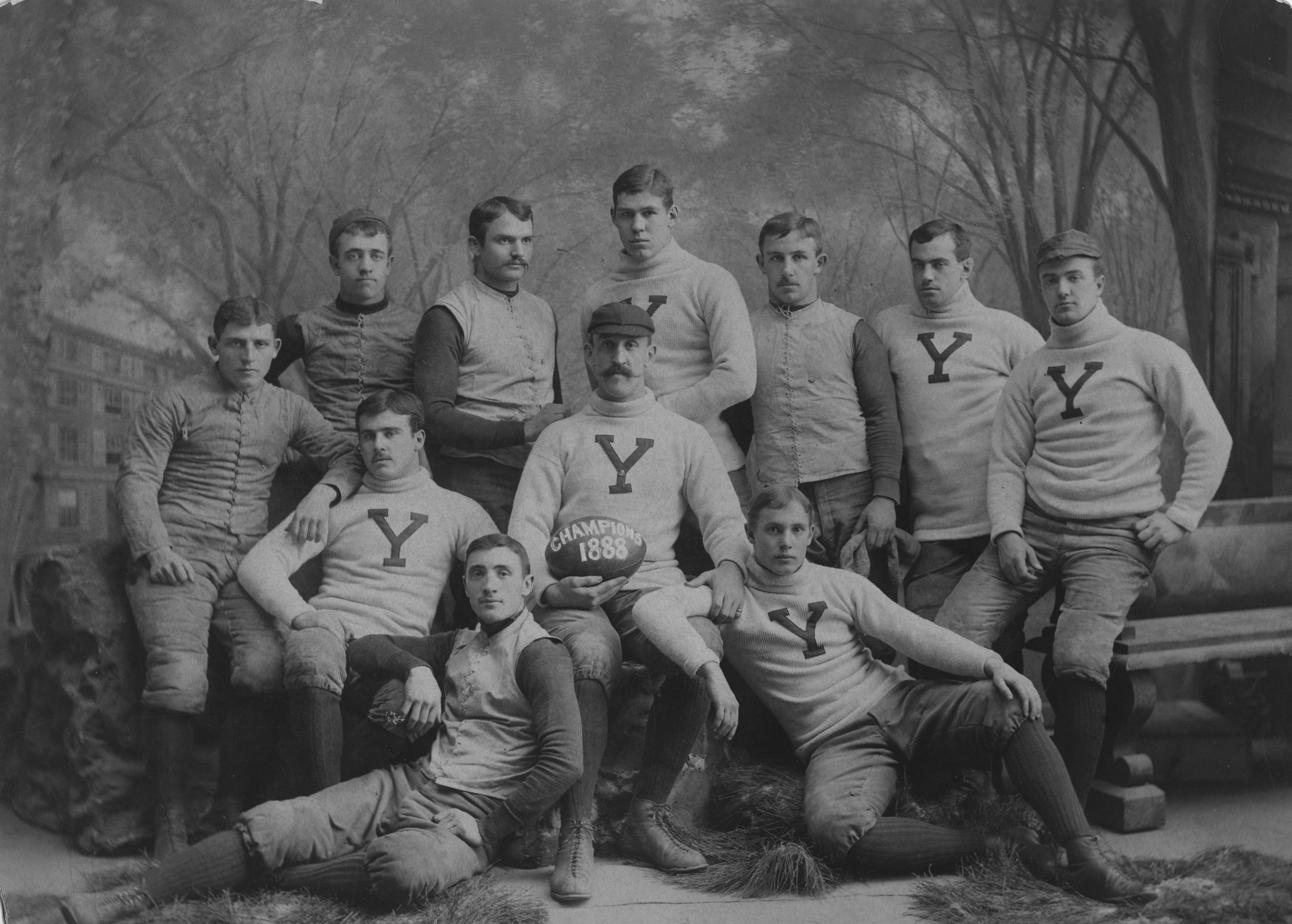

National champion
- Conference: Independent
- Record: 13–0
- Head coach: Walter Camp (1st season)
- Captain: William Herbert Corbin
- Home stadium: Yale Field

1888 Eastern college football independents records
	Conf.			Overall
Team	W	L	T	W		L		T
Yale		–		13	–	0	–	0
Harvard		–		12	–	1	–	0
Princeton		–		11	–	1	–	0
Lehigh		–		10	–	2	–	0
Trinity (CT)		–		5	–	1	–	1
Lafayette		–		6	–	3	–	0
Cornell		–		4	–	2	–	0
Penn		–		9	–	7	–	0
Bucknell		–		2	–	3	–	0
Fordham		–		1	–	2	–	0
Massachusetts		–		2	–	5	–	0
Worcester Tech		–		2	–	5	–	0
Wesleyan		–		2	–	7	–	0
Rutgers		–		1	–	6	–	1
Penn State		–		0	–	2	–	1
Swarthmore		–		0	–	5	–	0

The 1888 Yale Bulldogs football team represented Yale University in the 1888 college football season. In its first season under head coach Walter Camp, the team compiled a 13–0 record, did not allow a single point, and outscored opponents by a total of 698 to 0. The team has been retrospectively named as the national champion by the Billingsley Report, Helms Athletic Foundation, Houlgate System, National Championship Foundation, and Parke H. Davis.

Yale's point total was the largest ever made by a Yale team. The team scored 126 touchdowns and kicked 69 goals from touchdown and eight goals from the field. Ten of the starting 11 players on the 1888 Yale team went on to accept positions coaching other teams. Head coach Walter Camp and five players — Corbin, Pudge Heffelfinger, McClung, Amos Alonzo Stagg, and George Washington Woodruff — were subsequently inducted into the College Football Hall of Fame.

== Schedule ==
Date	Time	Opponent	Site	Result	Attendance	Source
September 29		Wesleyan	Yale Field; New Haven, CT	W 76–0		
October 6		Rutgers	Yale Field; New Haven, CT	W 65–0	50	
October 13	3:05 p.m.	at Penn	University Athletic Grounds; Philadelphia, PA	W 34–0	1,000	
October 16		at Wesleyan	Middletown, CT	W 46–0		
October 19		at Amherst	Amherst, MA	W 39–0		
October 20		at Williams	Williamstown, MA	W 30–0		
October 24		vs. Boston Tech	Ward Street Grounds; Hartford, CT	W 68–0		
October 27		Stevens	Yale Field; New Haven, CT	W 69–0		
November 3	3:30 p.m.	Penn	Yale Field; New Haven, CT	W 58–0	3,000	
November 6		Crescent Athletic Club	Washington Park; Brooklyn, NY	W 28–0		
November 10		Amherst	Yale Field; New Haven, CT	W 70–0		
November 17		Wesleyan	Yale Field; New Haven, CT	W 105–0		
November 24		vs. Princeton	Polo Grounds; New York, NY (rivalry)	W 10–0	10,000–20,000	

== Game summaries ==
=== Wesleyan (first game) ===
On September 29, 1888, Yale opened its season with a 76–0 victory over Wesleyan on the Yale field in New Haven, Connecticut. The starters for Yale were William Herbert Corbin (centre and captain), Brooks (right guard), Pudge Heffelfinger (left guard), William Rhodes (right tackle), Charles O. Gill (left tackle), William Wurtenburg (quarterback), Samuel B. Morison (back), B. Morrison (back), Robinson (right end), Townsend (left end), and Herbert McBride (fullback).

=== Rutgers ===
On October 6, 1888, Yale defeated Rutgers, 65–0, on Yale Field in New Haven. Due to rain, only 50 spectators attended the game. The game consisted of 35 minutes of playing time. Team captain William Herbert Corbin had his knee "thrown out of joint" during the game. Yale's starters were Robinson, William Rhodes, Bert Hanson, Corbin (centre), Pudge Heffelfinger, Charles O. Gill, Townsend, William Wurtenburg (quarterback), Samuel B. Morison (halfback), B. Morrison (halfback), Herbert McBride (fullback).

=== Penn (first game) ===
On October 13, 1888, starting at 3:05 p.m., Yale defeated Penn, 34–0, before a crowd of less than 1,000 at the 37th and Spruce Street grounds in Philadelphia. Yale's starting lineup in the game consisted of Frederic W. "Kid" Wallace (rusher), Charles O. Gill (rusher), Pudge Heffelfinger (rusher), William Herbert Corbin (rusher), Gordon B. Pike (rusher), William Rhodes (rusher), Samuel B. Morison (rusher), Clifford B. Twombly (quarterback), William P. Graves (halfback), William Wurtenburg (halfback), and Herbert McBride (fullback).

=== Wesleyan (second game) ===
On Tuesday, October 16, 1888, Yale played its second game against Wesleyan, prevailing by a 46–0 at Wesleyan's home field in Middletown, Connecticut. Yale's starting lineup was Frederic W. "Kid" Wallace (rusher), Bert Hanson (rusher), Pudge Heffelfinger (rusher), William Herbert Corbin (centre and captain), Gordon S. Pike (rusher), William Rhodes (rusher), McClintock (rusher), Clifford B. Twombly (quarterback), William Wurtenburg (halfback), Lee McClung (halfback), Herbert McBride (fullback).

=== Amherst (first game) ===
On Friday, October 19, 1888, starting at 3:20 p.m., Yale defeated Amherst, 39–0, on Amherst's home grounds in Amherst, Massachusetts.

=== Williams ===
On October 20, 1888, Yale defeated Williams, 30–0, on Williams' home field in Williamstown, Massachusetts. Yale's 30 points was the lowest score by a Yale team against any opponent other than a Harvard or Princeton team. Yale's starting lineup was Frederic W. "Kid" Wallace (rush line), Bert Hanson (rush line), Pudge Heffelfinger (rush line), William Herbert Corbin (rush line), Gordon Pike (centre), William Rhodes, Morrison, William Wurtenburg (quarterback), William P. Graves (halfback), Herbert McBride (halfback), and William T. Bull (fullback).

=== Stevens ===
On October 27, 1888, Yale defeated Stevens, 69–0. The game was played in drizzling rain at Yale Field in New Haven. Yale scored 44 of its points in the last inning.

=== Crescent Athletic Club ===
On Tuesday, November 6, 1888, in a game starting at 11:15 a.m., Yale defeated the Crescent Athletic Club, 28–0, before a crowd of nearly 1,600 at Washington Park in Brooklyn. Yale's starting lineup was Frederic W. "Kid" Wallace (rusher), Charles O. Gill (rusher), Ashbel Barney Newell (rusher), William Herbert Corbin (rusher), Brewster (rusher), Pudge Heffelfinger (rusher), Amos Alonzo Stagg (rusher), William Wurtenburg (quarterback), Lee McClung (halfback), Perry W. Harvey (halfback), and Herbert McBride (fullback).

=== Wesleyan (third game) ===
On November 17, 1888, Yale defeated Wesleyan, 105–0, at Yale Field in New Haven, Connecticut. Yale's tally of 105 points was its highest of the season and was the total of eight touchdowns (32 points), 11 goals (66 points), one goal from field (five points), and one safety (two points). Charles O. Gill was credited with the best play of the game, running three quarters of the field with Amos Alonzo Stagg acting "as a sort of bodyguard in the race for six points." Yale's starting lineup was Stagg (rusher), John A. Hartwell (rusher), George Washington Woodruff (rusher), Ashbel Barney Newell (center rush), Pudge Heffelfinger (rusher), Gill (rusher), Frederic W. "Kid" Wallace (rusher), William Wurtenburg (quarterback), Lee McClung (halfback), Herbert McBride (halfback), and William T. Bull (fullback).

=== Princeton ===
On November 24, 1888, Yale defeated Princeton, 10–0, at the Polo Grounds in Manhattan. Both teams were undefeated prior to the game which was billed as a contest for the intercollegiate football championship. The attendance was variously placed at 10,000 to 20,000 with The New York Times estimated the crowd at a little less than 15,000, evenly split between Princeton and Yale partisans. Yale's 10 points were scored on two goals kicked from the field by Yale's fullback William T. Bull. As the game ended, a "mob" of Yale supporters ran onto the field and carried the victorious players off on their shoulders. The starting lineup for Yale consisted of Frederic W. "Kid" Wallace (rusher), Charles O. Gill (rusher), George Washington Woodruff (centre rush), William Herbert Corbin (rusher), William Rhodes (rusher), Pudge Heffelfinger (rusher), and Amos Alonzo Stagg (rusher), William Wurtenburg (quarterback), Lee McClung (halfback), William P. Graves (halfback), and Bull (fullback).

== Roster ==
The 1888 season was a transitional season where linemen were still generally referred to generically as "rushers" or the "rush line", but were at other times referred to by reference to specific positions in the line. Where available from game accounts, both designations are included below. Players awarded varsity letters for the 1888 season are denoted with a (Y).

- Charles T. Brooks - right guard (Y)
- William T. Bull - fullback (Y)
- William Herbert Corbin - rusher/centre and captain (Y)
- Charles O. Gill - rusher/left tackle (Y)
- William P. Graves - halfback (Y)
- John A. Hartwell - rusher (Y)
- Bert Hanson - rusher
- Perry W. Harvey - halfback (Y)
- William W. "Pudge" Heffelfinger - rusher/left guard (Y)
- Charles S. King - (Y)
- Herbert McBride - halfback/fullback (Y)
- McClintock - rusher
- Lee McClung - halfback
- Samuel B. Morison - rusher/back (Y)
- B. Morrison - back
- Ashbel Barney Newell - centre rush (Y)
- Gordon B. Pike - rusher/centre (Y)
- Gifford Pinchot - (Y)
- William Rhodes - rusher/right tackle (Y)
- Robinson - right end
- Amos Alonzo Stagg - rusher (Y)
- John B. Townsend - left end
- Clifford Twombly - quarterback
- Frederic W. "Kid" Wallace - rusher (Y)
- George Washington Woodruff - rusher (Y)
- William Wurtenburg - quarterback/halfback (Y)

=== Scoring ===
The team scored 126 touchdowns, the distribution of which was:

Wurtenburg 20
McClung 16
Gill 14
Wallace 11
McBride 11
Graves 10

Heffelfinger 8
Corbin 6
Hartwell 5
Newell 5
Rhodes 4
Morrison 4

Moyle 3
Stagg 3
Pinchot 2
Harvey 2
Pike 1
Townsend 1
