= 1888 Princeton Tigers football team =

American college football season

1888 Princeton Tigers football
- Conference: Independent
- Record: 11–1
- Head coach: None
- Captain: Hector Cowan

1888 Eastern college football independents records
	Conf.			Overall
Team	W	L	T	W		L		T
Yale		–		13	–	0	–	0
Harvard		–		12	–	1	–	0
Princeton		–		11	–	1	–	0
Lehigh		–		10	–	2	–	0
Trinity (CT)		–		5	–	1	–	1
Lafayette		–		6	–	3	–	0
Cornell		–		4	–	2	–	0
Penn		–		9	–	7	–	0
Bucknell		–		2	–	3	–	0
Fordham		–		1	–	2	–	0
Massachusetts		–		2	–	5	–	0
Worcester Tech		–		2	–	5	–	0
Wesleyan		–		2	–	7	–	0
Rutgers		–		1	–	6	–	1
Penn State		–		0	–	2	–	1
Swarthmore		–		0	–	5	–	0

The 1888 Princeton Tigers football team represented Princeton University in the 1888 college football season. The team compiled an 11–1 record. The team held its first ten opponents scoreless, winning those games by a combined 589 to 0 score. The team's sole loss was by a 10–0 score in the final game of the season against an undefeated Yale team that has been recognized as the 1888 national champion.

The practice of selecting All-American football teams began the following year with the 1890 College Football All-America Team. However, Princeton's roster in 1888 included a number of star players, including fullback Knowlton "Snake" Ames, end Jesse Riggs, right tackle Hector Cowan.

== Schedule ==
Date	Time	Opponent	Site	Result	Attendance	Source
September 29		Lehigh	University Field; Princeton, NJ	W 75–0		
October 7		vs. Crescent Athletic Club	Staten Island A.C. Grounds; Staten Island , NY	W 31–0		
October 10		Penn	University Field; Princeton, NJ (rivalry)	W 63–0		
October 13		Stevens	University Field; Princeton, NJ	W 80–0		
October 17		at Rutgers	College Field; New Brunswick, NJ (rivalry)	W 78–0		
October 20	4:00 p.m.	at Penn	University Athletic Grounds; Philadelphia, PA	W 36–0 or W 38–0	2,000	
October 24		Rutgers	University Field; Princeton, NJ	W 82–0		
November 3		Johns Hopkins	University Field; Princeton, NJ	W 10–0		
November 6		vs. Wesleyan	Polo Grounds; New York, NY	W 44–0	2,500	
November 10	3:00 p.m.	at Penn	University Athletic Grounds; Philadelphia, PA	W 4–0		
November 17		Harvard	University Field; Princeton, NJ (rivalry)	W 18–6		
November 24		vs. Yale	Polo Grounds; New York, NY (rivalry)	L 0–10	10,000–20,000	

== Roster ==
- Knowlton Ames, FB
- Black, HB
- Brovaird
- Roscoe Channing, HB
- Cook
- Hector Cowan
- William George, C
- R. Hodge
- S. Hodge
- William Mann Irvine
- Hugh Janeway, G
- Morvey, HB
- Edgar Allan Poe, QB
- Jesse Riggs
- Tredinnick
