= 1888 Stevens football team =

American college football season

1888 Stevens football
- Conference: Eastern Intercollegiate Football Association
- Record: 2–7–1 (1–2 EIFA)
- Head coach: None
- Home stadium: St. George's Cricket Grounds

1888 Eastern Intercollegiate Football Association standings
	Conf.					Overall
Team	W		L		T	W		L		T
Boston Tech +	3	–	1	–	0	6	–	5	–	0
Dartmouth +	3	–	1	–	0	3	–	4	–	0
Williams	2	–	2	–	0	3	–	5	–	0
Stevens	1	–	2	–	0	2	–	7	–	1
Amherst	0	–	3	–	0	2	–	8	–	1
+ – Conference co-champions

The 1888 Stevens football team represented Stevens Institute of Technology as a member of the Eastern Intercollegiate Football Association (EIFA) during the 1888 college football season. Stevens compiled an overall record of 2–7–1 with a mark of 1–2 in conference play, placing fourth in the EIFA. The team played home games at St. George's Cricket Grounds in Hoboken, New Jersey.

== Schedule ==
Date	Time	Opponent	Site	Result	Source
October 2		Olympic Athletic Club*	Hoboken, NJ	W 2–0	
October 6	3:30 p.m.	at Penn*	University Athletic Grounds; Philadelphia, PA	L 0–48	
October 13		at Princeton*	University Field; Princeton, NJ	L 0–80	
October 27		at Yale*	Yale Field; New Haven, CT	L 0–69	
November 1		at Rutgers*	New Brunswick, NJ	T 18–18	
November 3		Trinity (CT)*	St. George's Cricket Grounds; Hoboken, NJ	L 0–6	
November 10		at Lehigh*	Bethlehem, PA	L 0–10	
November 17		at Williams	Weston Field; Williamstown, MA	L 4–42	
November 19	2:15 p.m.	vs. Dartmouth	Williamstown, MA	W 30–0	
November 24	10:10 a.m.	Boston Tech	St. George's Cricket Grounds; Hoboken, NJ	L 12–14	
*Non-conference game
