= 1888 Cornell Big Red football team =

American college football season

1888 Cornell Big Red football
- Conference: Independent
- Record: 4–2
- Head coach: None
- Captain: William G. Howell

1888 Eastern college football independents records
| | Conf. | | | Overall |
| Team | W | L | T | W | | L | | T |
|---|---|---|---|---|---|---|---|---|
| Yale | | – | | 13 | – | 0 | – | 0 |
| Harvard | | – | | 12 | – | 1 | – | 0 |
| Princeton | | – | | 11 | – | 1 | – | 0 |
| Lehigh | | – | | 10 | – | 2 | – | 0 |
| Trinity (CT) | | – | | 5 | – | 1 | – | 1 |
| Lafayette | | – | | 6 | – | 3 | – | 0 |
| Cornell | | – | | 4 | – | 2 | – | 0 |
| Penn | | – | | 9 | – | 7 | – | 0 |
| Bucknell | | – | | 2 | – | 3 | – | 0 |
| Fordham | | – | | 1 | – | 2 | – | 0 |
| Massachusetts | | – | | 2 | – | 4 | – | 0 |
| Wesleyan | | – | | 2 | – | 7 | – | 0 |
| Worcester Tech | | – | | 1 | – | 4 | – | 0 |
| Rutgers | | – | | 1 | – | 6 | – | 1 |
| Penn State | | – | | 0 | – | 2 | – | 1 |
| Swarthmore | | – | | 0 | – | 5 | – | 0 |

The 1888 Cornell Big Red football team was an American football team that represented Cornell University during the 1888 college football season. The team compiled a 4–2 record and outscored opponents by a total of 96 to 24.

== Schedule ==
| Date | Opponent | Site | Result | Attendance | Source |
|---|---|---|---|---|---|
| October 20 | Union Foot Ball Team of Palmyra | Ithaca, NY | W 26–0 | | |
| October 27 | Williams | Ithaca, NY | W 20–0 | | |
| November 3 | Union (NY) | Ithaca, NY | W 30–4 | | |
| November 10 | Lafayette | Ithaca, NY | L 0–16 | | |
| November 17 | Bucknell | Ithaca, NY | W 20–0 | | |
| November 29 | vs. Lehigh | Elmira, NY | L 0–4 | 2,500 | |
