= Dudley Dean =

American football player (1871–1950)

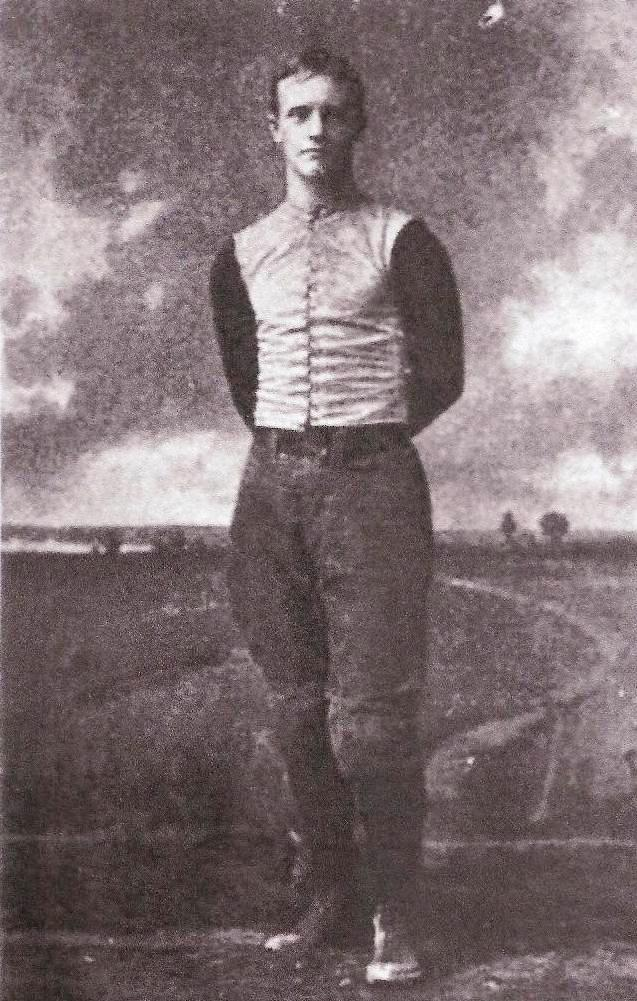
- Portrait of Dudley Dean from Walter Camp's 1894 book, "American Football"

Harvard Crimson
- Position: Quarterback

Personal information
- Born: April 19, 1871; Lake Village, New Hampshire, U.S.
- Died: September 25, 1950 (aged 79); Cohasset, Massachusetts, U.S.

Career information
- College: Harvard (1890)

Awards and highlights
- Consensus All-American (1890)

Dudley Stuart Dean (April 19, 1871 – September 25, 1950) was an All-American football quarterback for Harvard University. He played quarterback for Harvard from 1888 to 1890 and was selected as an All-American in 1890. Dean also fought with the Rough Riders at the Battle of San Juan Hill during the Spanish–American War.

== College athlete at Harvard ==
A native of Lake Village, New Hampshire, Dean enrolled at Harvard University. While at Harvard, Dean was the quarterback for Harvard's varsity football team. He became famous for his role in Harvard's November 1890 football victory over Yale—the first since the schools first met in 1875. A newspaper account of the game described a touchdown run from midfield by Dean. Yale had the ball at midfield when Dean broke through past Hall of Famer Pudge Heffelfinger and batted the ball out of the hands of the Yale quarterback. The report noted: "The ball bounded beautifully for the now famous 'Dud.' He caught it as it came up saying, 'Now Dud's your chance.' On the run he was past the Yale backs ... and had a clear field to Yale's unprotected goal." The report called Dean the "hero of the day" and concluded as follows:

"After all has been said, however, about individual players, and a vast deal might be said, the last word should be devoted to Dudley Dean. If the Harvard victory can be ascribed to one man more than any other, that man is Dean. His tackling and breaking through were unsurpassed.

At the end of the 1890 season, Dean was selected as the quarterback on the All-American football team. Dean also played shortstop and second base for the Harvard baseball team and was captain of that team in 1891. His skills as a baseball player were such that he traveled with Albert Spalding's professional baseball tour of England and was paid £4 a week plus expenses.

== Military service ==
During the Spanish–American War, Dudley enlisted and served with the Rough Riders. In July 1898, after the Battle of San Juan Hill, Dean was one of five members of the regiment mentioned by Theodore Roosevelt for bravery on the battlefield. In his book, "The Rough riders, a history of the First United States volunteer cavalry," Roosevelt named Dean as "one of the men whom I noticed as leading in the charges and always being nearest the enemy." Upon his return, Dudley told how the Rough Riders had been "literally riddled by the murderous fire from ambush." He called Gen. Wood and Col. Roosevelt "dandies" and noted: "It is due to them largely that the rough riders came home in better physical condition than most of the volunteers. Teddy hustled about and saw that food reached us." In October 1898, the New York World published an article titled, "Dudley S. Dean, Twice a Hero," which told of his exploits on the gridiron and at the Battle of San Juan Hill:

"Dudley S. Dean ... is, as his friends express it, twice a hero. When Col. Roosevelt organized his regiment of Rough Riders, Mr. Dean was one of the first to enlist. He served throughout the campaign with distinction, and was in the thin brown line that charged up San Juan Hill. But his run at Springfield Nov. 22, 1890, when Harvard defeated Yale, is what endears him particularly to Harvard football men and the football world in general. On that occasion Dean ran through the entire Yale team for ninety yards and scored a goal."

During World War II, Dean was a lieutenant colonel in the U.S. Army Air Forces and was the executive producer of the play "Winged Victory," which ran from November 1943 to May 1944. The play was intended as a morale booster and fundraiser for the Army Emergency Relief Fund. The play depicted both the training and work of airmen.

== Business career ==
After graduating from Harvard, Dudley worked for the El Paso and Western Railroad. He was also a reporter and columnist for the New York World and Boston Globe for a time.

Dean was involved for most of his professional career in the mining business, and the companies with which he was associated had extensive land, lumber and mineral holdings in the Gogebic Range of northern Michigan. He was affiliated with the Keweenaw Land Association, Ltd. for more than 50 years. In 1920, Dean was the treasurer of the Keweenaw Land Association, at which time the company owned 400,000 acres (1,600 km^{2}) of timber and mineral lands in the copper belt of Michigan's Upper Peninsula. Dean eventually became the company's president. He was also the treasurer of the Newport Land Company.

== Family and friends ==
Dudley married Kate Saxton Raynolds, the sister of judge Herbert F. Raynolds and opera singer Sarame Raynolds. One of their sons, John H. Dean, also played football for Harvard and was captain of the 1933 team.

Dudley became friends with Joseph P. Kennedy as the two men spent summers together in Cohasset, Massachusetts. In 1922, Dudley led an unsuccessful campaign to have Kennedy admitted to the Cohasset Golf Club, and several of his letters lobbying for Kennedy's admission were published in the book, The Fitzgeralds and the Kennedys, by Doris Kearns Goodwin.

Dean died at his home in Cohasset at age 79.
