= 1888 Boston Tech football team =

American college football season

1888 Boston Tech football

EIFA co-champion
- Conference: Eastern Intercollegiate Football Association
- Record: 6–5 (3–1 EIFA)
- Head coach: None
- Home stadium: Union Grounds

1888 Eastern Intercollegiate Football Association standings
	Conf.					Overall
Team	W		L		T	W		L		T
Boston Tech +	3	–	1	–	0	6	–	5	–	0
Dartmouth +	3	–	1	–	0	3	–	4	–	0
Williams	2	–	2	–	0	3	–	5	–	0
Stevens	1	–	2	–	0	2	–	7	–	1
Amherst	0	–	3	–	0	2	–	8	–	1
+ – Conference co-champions

The 1888 Boston Tech football team represented Boston Tech—now known as the Massachusetts Institute of Technology (MIT)—as a member of the Eastern Intercollegiate Football Association (EIFA) during the 1888 college football season. Boston Tech compiled an overall record of 6–5 with a mark of 3–1 in conference play, sharing the EIFA title with Dartmouth. The team played home games at Union Grounds in Boston.

== Schedule ==
Date	Time	Opponent	Site	Result	Source
October 13	3:08 p.m.	at Harvard*	Jarvis Field; Cambridge, MA	L 0–18	
October 20		Phillips Exeter*	Union Grounds; Boston, MA	W 13–0	
October 24		vs. Yale*	Ward Street grounds; Hartford, CT	L 0–68	
October 27	2:00 p.m.	Amherst	Union Grounds; Boston, MA	W 48–0	
October 31		at Harvard*	Jarvis Field; Cambridge, MA	L 0–42	
November 3		at Phillips Exeter*	Exeter, NH	W 11–4	
November 5		at Phillips Academy*	Andover, MA	L 0–10	
November 10		at Dartmouth	Hanover, NH	L 0–30	
November 17		Worcester Tech*	Union Grounds; Boston, MA	W 24–0	
November 21	3:05 p.m.	Williams	Union Grounds; Boston, MA	W 22–0	
November 24	10:10 a.m.	at Stevens	St. George's Cricket Grounds; Hoboken, NJ	W 14–12	
*Non-conference game
