= 1888 Rutgers Queensmen football team =

American college football season

1888 Rutgers Queensmen football
- Conference: Independent
- Record: 1–6–1
- Head coach: None
- Captain: Arthur J. Collier
- Home stadium: College Field

1888 Eastern college football independents records
	Conf.			Overall
Team	W	L	T	W		L		T
Yale		–		13	–	0	–	0
Harvard		–		12	–	1	–	0
Princeton		–		11	–	1	–	0
Lehigh		–		10	–	2	–	0
Trinity (CT)		–		5	–	1	–	1
Lafayette		–		6	–	3	–	0
Cornell		–		4	–	2	–	0
Penn		–		9	–	7	–	0
Bucknell		–		2	–	3	–	0
Fordham		–		1	–	2	–	0
Massachusetts		–		2	–	5	–	0
Worcester Tech		–		2	–	5	–	0
Wesleyan		–		2	–	7	–	0
Rutgers		–		1	–	6	–	1
Penn State		–		0	–	2	–	1
Swarthmore		–		0	–	5	–	0

The 1888 Rutgers Queensmen football team represented Rutgers University as an independent during the 1888 college football season. The Queensmen compiled a 1–6–1 record. The team had no coach, and its captain was Arthur J. Collier.

== Schedule ==
Date	Opponent	Site	Result	Attendance	Source
October 6	at Yale	Yale Field; New Haven, CT	L 0–65	50	
October 13	at Lehigh	Bethlehem, PA	L 0–30		
October 17	Princeton	New Brunswick, NJ (rivalry)	L 0–78		
October 20	Lafayette	New Brunswick, NJ	L 0–4		
October 24	at Princeton	University Field; Princeton, NJ	L 0–82		
November 1	Stevens	New Brunswick, NJ	T 18–18		
November 3	at Williams	Williamstown, MA	L 0–48		
November 5	at Ridgefield Athletic Club		W 18–6		
