= 1888 Penn Quakers football team =

American college football season

1888 Penn Quakers football
- Conference: Independent
- Record: 9–7
- Head coach: Woody Wagenhorst (1st season)
- Captain: Tom Hulme
- Home stadium: University Athletic Grounds

1888 Eastern college football independents records
	Conf.			Overall
Team	W	L	T	W		L		T
Yale		–		13	–	0	–	0
Harvard		–		12	–	1	–	0
Princeton		–		11	–	1	–	0
Lehigh		–		10	–	2	–	0
Trinity (CT)		–		5	–	1	–	1
Lafayette		–		6	–	3	–	0
Cornell		–		4	–	2	–	0
Penn		–		9	–	7	–	0
Bucknell		–		2	–	3	–	0
Fordham		–		1	–	2	–	0
Massachusetts		–		2	–	5	–	0
Worcester Tech		–		2	–	5	–	0
Wesleyan		–		2	–	7	–	0
Rutgers		–		1	–	6	–	1
Penn State		–		0	–	2	–	1
Swarthmore		–		0	–	5	–	0

The 1888 Penn Quakers football team was an American football team that represented the University of Pennsylvania during the 1888 college football season. In its first season under head coach Woody Wagenhorst, the team compiled a 9–7 record and was outscored by a total of 294 to 278. Halfback Tom Hulme was the team captain. The team played its home games at the University Athletic Grounds located at 37th and Spruce Streets.

== Schedule ==
Date	Time	Opponent	Site	Result	Attendance	Source
October 3		Graduates	University Athletic Grounds; Philadelphia, PA	W 20–6		
October 6	3:30 p.m.	Stevens	University Athletic Grounds; Philadelphia, PA	W 48–0		
October 10		at Princeton	University Field; Princeton, NJ (rivalry)	L 0–63		
October 13	3:05 p.m.	Yale	University Athletic Grounds; Philadelphia, PA	L 0–34	1,000	
October 17	3:40 p.m.	at Swarthmore	Swarthmore, PA	W 44–6	500	
October 20	4:00 p.m.	Princeton	University Athletic Grounds; Philadelphia, PA	L 0–36 or 0–38	2,000	
October 24	4:20 p.m.	at Tioga Athletic Association	Westmorland station grounds; Philadelphia, PA	W 12–4		
October 27	3:25 p.m.	at Lehigh	Bethlehem, PA	W 36–0		
November 3	3:30 p.m.	at Yale	Yale Field; New Haven, CT	L 0–58	3,000	
November 7		at Lafayette	Easton, PA	L 6–12		
November 10	3:00 p.m.	Princeton	University Athletic Grounds; Philadelphia, PA	L 0–4		
November 19	3:10 p.m.	Harvard	University Athletic Grounds; Philadelphia, PA (rivalry)	L 0–48	300	
November 21	3:00 p.m.	Lafayette	University Athletic Grounds; Philadelphia, PA	W 50–0		
November 29	2:30 p.m.	vs. Wesleyan	Polo Grounds; New York, NY	W 18–6	2,500	
November 30	2:10 p.m.	at Johns Hopkins	Oriole Park; Baltimore, MD	W 24–10		
December 1		at Navy	Annapolis, MD	W 20–9		
