= Ralph Warren =

Ralph Warren may refer to:

- Ralph Warren (American football) (1871–1928), All-American football player
- Ralph Warren (Lord Mayor) (c. 1481–1553), twice Lord Mayor of London
- Ralph Warren (politician) (1882–1954), Canadian member of Ontario and federal governments
