= 1888 Bucknell football team =

American college football season

1888 Bucknell football
- Conference: Independent
- Record: 2–3
- Head coach: None
- Captain: Charles Allen

1888 Eastern college football independents records
	Conf.			Overall
Team	W	L	T	W		L		T
Yale		–		13	–	0	–	0
Harvard		–		12	–	1	–	0
Princeton		–		11	–	1	–	0
Lehigh		–		10	–	2	–	0
Trinity (CT)		–		5	–	1	–	1
Lafayette		–		6	–	3	–	0
Cornell		–		4	–	2	–	0
Penn		–		9	–	7	–	0
Bucknell		–		2	–	3	–	0
Fordham		–		1	–	2	–	0
Massachusetts		–		2	–	4	–	0
Wesleyan		–		2	–	7	–	0
Worcester Tech		–		1	–	4	–	0
Rutgers		–		1	–	6	–	1
Penn State		–		0	–	2	–	1
Swarthmore		–		0	–	5	–	0

The 1888 Bucknell football team was an American football team that represented Bucknell University as an independent during the 1888 college football season. The team compiled a 2–3 record and had no head coach. Charles Allen was the team captain.

== Schedule ==
Date	Time	Opponent	Site	Result	Source
October 10		at Lafayette	The Quad; Easton, PA	L 0–54	
October 11		at Lehigh	Bethlehem, PA	L 0–74	
October 20	10:30 a.m.	at Wyoming Seminary	Seminary campus; Kingston, PA	W 10–4	
November 2		Dickinson	Lewisburg, PA	W 18–8	
November 17		at Cornell	Ithaca, NY	L 0–20	
