= Sarame Raynolds =

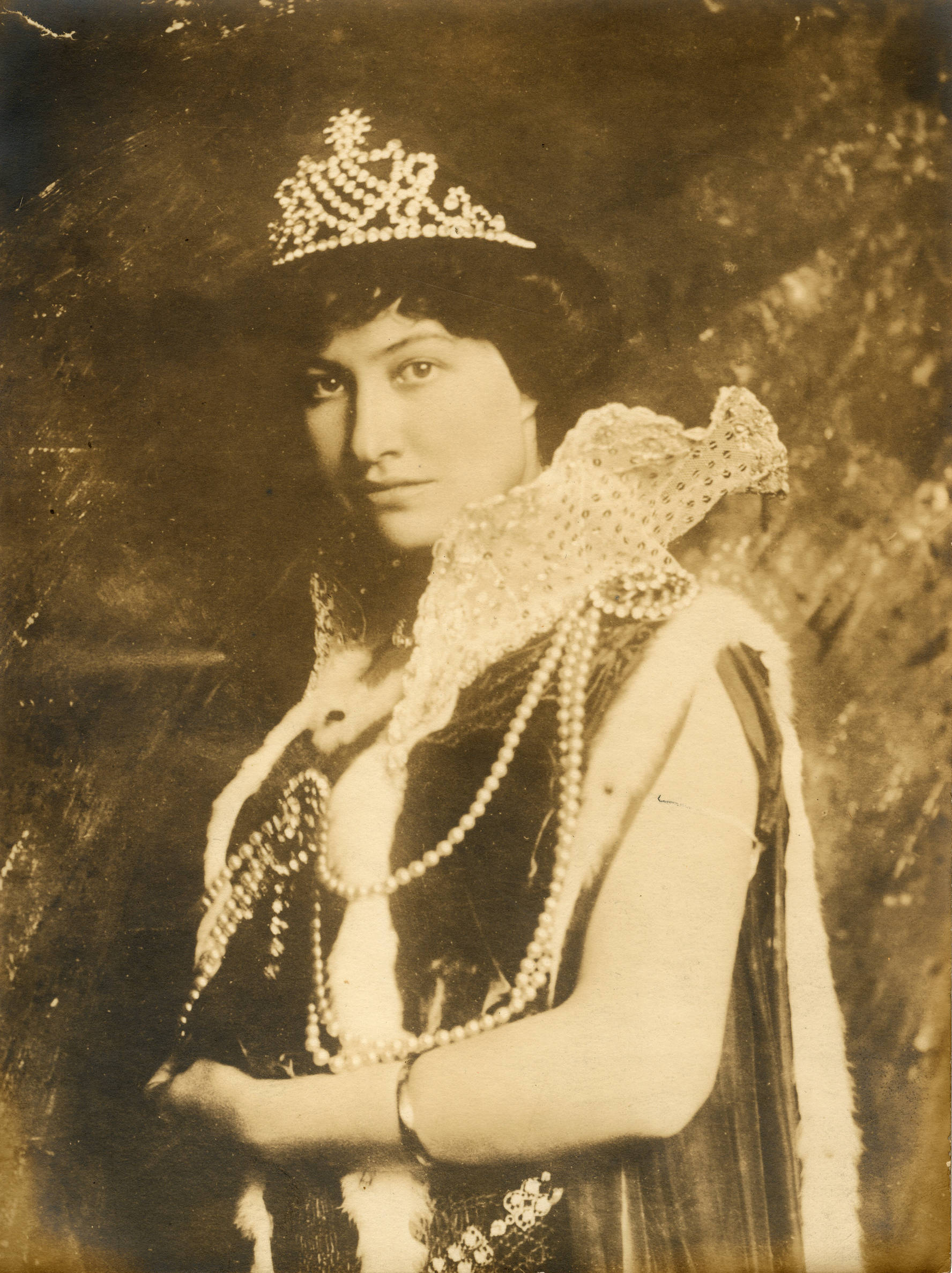
- Born: August 2, 1885; Las Vegas, New Mexico, U.S.
- Died: July 31, 1961 (age 75); New York, U.S.
- Other names: Sara May Raynolds, Sara Mae Raynolds, Sara Rainoldi, Sarame Drake
- Occupations: Opera singer, concert singer
- Relatives: Herbert F. Raynolds (brother); Dudley Dean (brother-in-law)

Sarame Raynolds (August 2, 1885 – July 31, 1961) was an American singer on the opera and concert stage in the 1910s.

== Early life and education ==
Raynolds was from Las Vegas, New Mexico, the daughter of Joshua Saxton Raynolds and Sarah Anne (Sallie) Robbins Raynolds. Her father was a bank president in Albuquerque, New Mexico, and El Paso, Texas, and her brother Herbert F. Raynolds was a judge. Her sister Kate married military officer Dudley Dean. She attended Miss Severn's School in Boston, and the New England Conservatory of Music from 1902 to 1906, and pursued further musical training in Europe, with Jean de Reszke and others.

== Career ==
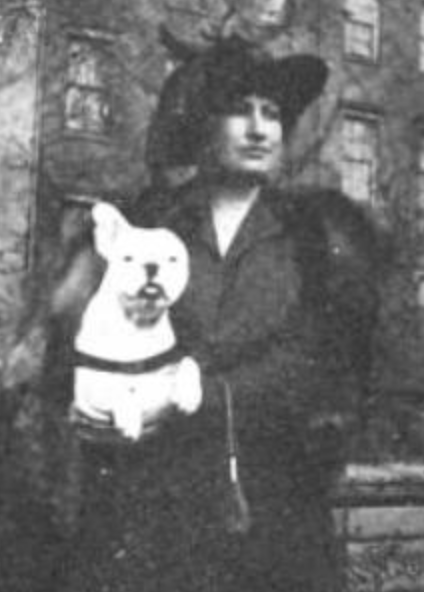
Sarame Raynolds with a dog, from a 1915 publication

Raynolds sang professionally in Italy before making her American debut in Los Angeles in 1915, in Aida and I Lombardi alla prima crociata, with the Los Angeles National Grand Opera Company. Her voice "rang with a brilliance and opulence of tone that completely filled the auditorium", according to the Musical Courier account of her debut. Also in 1915, she toured with a quartet in the American Southwest, gave a recital at the Panama–California Exposition in San Diego, and drove from Texas to New York with her mother, sister, and cousin.

Raynolds sang with the Chicago Grand Opera Company in the 1916–1917 season, and was an assisting artist at the Chicago Musical College. She toured the United States in the leading role of Tosca with the Boston National Grand Opera Company in 1917. In 1918 she was a soloist with the Minneapolis Symphony Orchestra, and returned to Europe with the YMCA, to entertain American troops in World War I. Ella Holloway Lewis was her manager in the 1910s.

== Personal life ==
Raynolds had a home in Florida in 1919. She married bookseller and World War I veteran Marston Elliott Drake in 1923. They lived in Plandome, New York, and had a son, Raynolds Drake, and a daughter, Sarame R. (Sally) Drake. Raynolds died in 1961, at the age of 75. There is a collection of her papers at the New England Conservatory of Music.
