= 1888 Dartmouth football team =

American college football season

1888 Dartmouth football

EIFA co-champion
- Conference: Eastern Intercollegiate Football Association
- Record: 3–4 (3–1 EIFA)
- Head coach: None
- Captain: William Odlin

1888 Eastern Intercollegiate Football Association standings
	Conf.					Overall
Team	W		L		T	W		L		T
Boston Tech +	3	–	1	–	0	6	–	5	–	0
Dartmouth +	3	–	1	–	0	3	–	4	–	0
Williams	2	–	2	–	0	3	–	5	–	0
Stevens	1	–	2	–	0	2	–	7	–	1
Amherst	0	–	3	–	0	2	–	8	–	1
+ – Conference co-champions

The 1888 Dartmouth football team represented Dartmouth College as a member of the Eastern Intercollegiate Football Association (EIFA) during the 1888 college football season. Dartmouth compiled an overall record of 3–4 with a mark of 3–1 in conference play, sharing the EIFA title with Boston Tech.

== Schedule ==
Date	Time	Opponent	Site	Result	Source
October 30		at Harvard*	Holmes Field; Cambridge, MA (rivalry)	L 0–74	
October 31		at Phillips Exeter Academy*	Exeter, NH	L 10–12	
November 1		at Phillips Academy*	Andover, MA	L 4–14	
November 10		Boston Tech	Hanover, NH	W 30–0	
November 14	2:50 p.m.	Williams	Hanover, NH	W 36–6	
November 19	2:15 p.m.	vs. Stevens	Williamstown, MA	L 0–30	
November 21		at Amherst	Amherst, MA	W 40–0	
*Non-conference game
