= Edward M. Tillinghast =

American football player and coach (1866–1956)

Biographical details
- Born: December 16, 1866; Hope Valley, Rhode Island, U.S.
- Died: June 23, 1956 (aged 89); Bridgton, Maine, U.S.
- Education: Yale

Playing career
- 1880s: Yale
- 1888–1892: Cleveland Athletic Club
- Position: Quarterback

Coaching career (HC unless noted)
- 1891: Western Reserve

Head coaching record
- Overall: 1–0

Edward Montclair Tillinghast (December 16, 1866 – June 23, 1956) was an American football player and coach. While playing for the Cleveland Athletic Club, he coached the 1891 Western Reserve football team.

Tillinghast played football at Yale University in the 1880s and was a member of Delta Kappa Epsilon.

== Head coaching record ==
Year	Team	Overall	Conference	Standing	Bowl/playoffs
Western Reserve (Ohio Intercollegiate Athletic Association) (1891)
1891	Western Reserve	1–0	0–0		
Western Reserve:		1–0			
Total:		1–0			
National championship Conference title Conference division title or championship game berth
