= Richard H. Hanna =

American judge (1879–1946)

Richard H. Hanna (July 31, 1879 – August 17, 1946) was an attorney and justice of the New Mexico Supreme Court from January 10, 1912 to November 7, 1918, when he was defeated for reelection.

Born in Kankakee, Illinois, Hanna attended the public schools, and in 1896 enrolled at Northwestern University, where he remained for two years, until his health compelled him to move west. His father, Isaac Bird Hanna, was superintendent of the national forests of New Mexico and Arizona from 1900-1905.

In January 1900, he enrolled as a student in the Law Department of the University of Colorado at Boulder, graduating in June 1903. He then moved to Santa Fe, New Mexico, and entered the practice of law. Hanna was admitted to the territorial bar association in 1904, and served as its secretary from 1904-1907. In 1905 he married Clara Zimmer of Santa Fe. In addition to his legal career, he was the president of the Santa Fe Chamber of Commerce and secretary of the Territorial Library Board from 1904-1911.

Hanna was elected to the New Mexico Supreme Court in 1911, and served one six-year term beginning in 1912. When he ran for re-election in 1918 he lost to Herbert F. Raynolds. After leaving the court he moved to Albuquerque and became part of the law firm Hanna, Wilson, and Brophy until 1943.

In 1920, he ran unsuccessfully for Governor of New Mexico as a Democrat. He also campaigned unsuccessfully for United States Senator in 1921. In 1924, the New Mexico Supreme Court reprimanded and censured Hanna for "unprofessional conduct" and temporarily suspended from practicing law.

Hanna served as special attorney for the Pueblo Indians in the Department of the Interior during Woodrow Wilson's administration. He authored the Pueblo Lands Act of 1924, and contributed to the settlement of Indian land titles across New Mexico.

Hanna died at St. Joseph Hospital in Albuquerque, at the age of 68.

Political offices
Preceded by Newly established court	Justice of the New Mexico Supreme Court; 1912–1918	Succeeded by Herbert F. Raynolds
