= Dudley Riggs (American football) =

American football player (1875–1913)

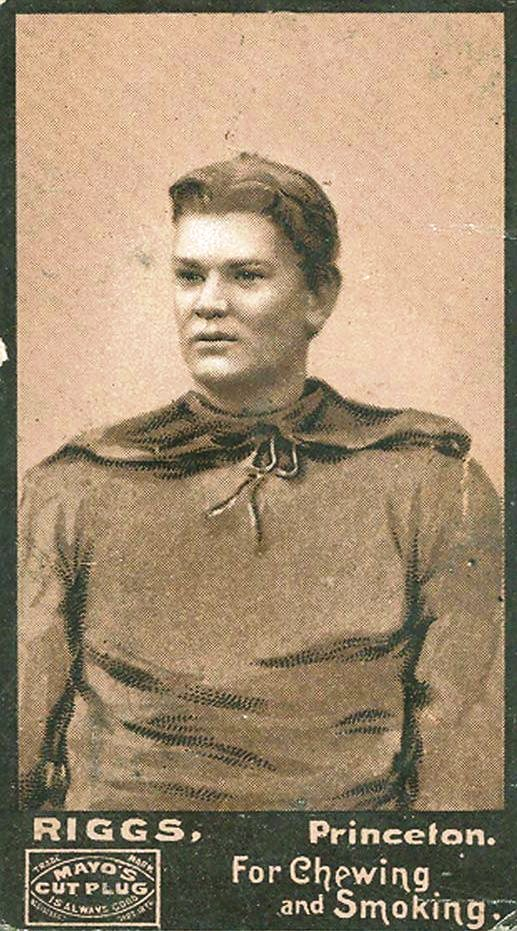
- Dudley Riggs, 1894 Mayo's Cut Plug card

Profile
- Position: Guard

Personal information
- Born: January 28, 1875; Baltimore, Maryland, U.S.
- Died: May 22, 1913 (aged 38); Baltimore, Maryland, U.S.

Career information
- College: Princeton (1895)

Awards and highlights
- Consensus All-American (1895)

Thomas Dudley Riggs (January 28, 1875 – May 22, 1913) was an All-American football player. He played for Princeton University and was selected as an All-American in 1895.

== Early life ==
Riggs was the son of Lawrason Riggs, a well-known banker of Baltimore, Maryland. The family had founded and operated Riggs Bank, which financed Samuel Morse's invention of the telegraph in 1845 and lent $16 million to the United States to fund the Mexican–American War. Riggs received his elementary training in a Baltimore private school and later attended St. Paul's School, a private preparatory school in Concord, New Hampshire.

== All-American football player at Princeton ==
After completing his studies at St. Paul's, Riggs enrolled at Princeton University. He followed his older brother, Jesse Riggs, to Princeton. Jesse had been an All-American for Princeton's football team, and Dudley followed in his older brother's footsteps by joining the Princeton football team. In September 1893, a newspaper account compared Dudley to his older brother:

Another new man that gives much promise is a brother of the great Jesse Riggs, '92. This one's name is Dudley and he weighs 185 pounds -- not bad to begin with. It is said he is another Jesse, built like him, a football fighter of his spirit and just as tricky as the big guard ...

By 1895, Riggs weighed 211 pounds and was 6-feet, 1-inch in height. He played center for Princeton's varsity football team in 1894 and left guard in 1895. At the end of the 1895 season, Riggs was selected as an All-American. He graduated from Princeton with a Bachelor of Science degree as part of the class of 1897.

== Later life ==
After graduating from Princeton, Riggs married Miss Laura Lanman, of Hartford, Connecticut, and the couple traveled to Scotland for their honeymoon. Riggs and his wife had three children, T. Dudley Riggs Jr., Elizabeth Riggs and Mary Lawrason Riggs.

He was active in Baltimore's clubs. He was a member of the Baltimore and Pimlico Country Clubs the Baltimore Hunt Club, and the Green Spring Valley Hunt Club. He was also active in the Masonic organization, and the president of the Paint and Powder Club. Riggs was a friend of John D. Rockefeller Jr., and the two were observed by reporters traveling to Philadelphia in 1907 in a new 60–65 horsepower (48 kW) Isotta Fraschini limousine.

Riggs was also a breeder of horses, beagles and other hunting dogs. His beagle, Nordley Ben, was entered in contests throughout the country. Riggs was also an officer of the National Beagle Club of America.

Riggs and his family lived for many years on a 150-acre (0.61 km^{2}) estate in Stevenson, Maryland, in Green Spring Valley. The estate included a large home, stables, and several outbuildings. In 1907, Riggs sold his Maryland estate for $50,000 and moved to Hartford, Connecticut, to engage in business. Three years later, in 1910, Riggs purchased several acres in the Brooklandwood section of Green Spring Valley.

Riggs died in 1913 at Baltimore, Maryland, aged 38. He died of pemphigus, a disease usually found in cattle and commonly known as "foot and mouth disease." Riggs was a horse breeder and was believed to have contracted the disease in the stables of his country home in the Green Springs Valley. Riggs was survived by his wife and children.

== See also ==
- 1895 College Football All-America Team
