= John Adams (center) =

American football center

Profile
- Position: Center

Career information
- College: Penn

Awards and highlights
- Consensus All-American (1891)

John Adams was a college football player. He was the first-ever All-American for the Penn Quakers.
