= William Rhodes (American football) =

American football player and coach (1869–1914)

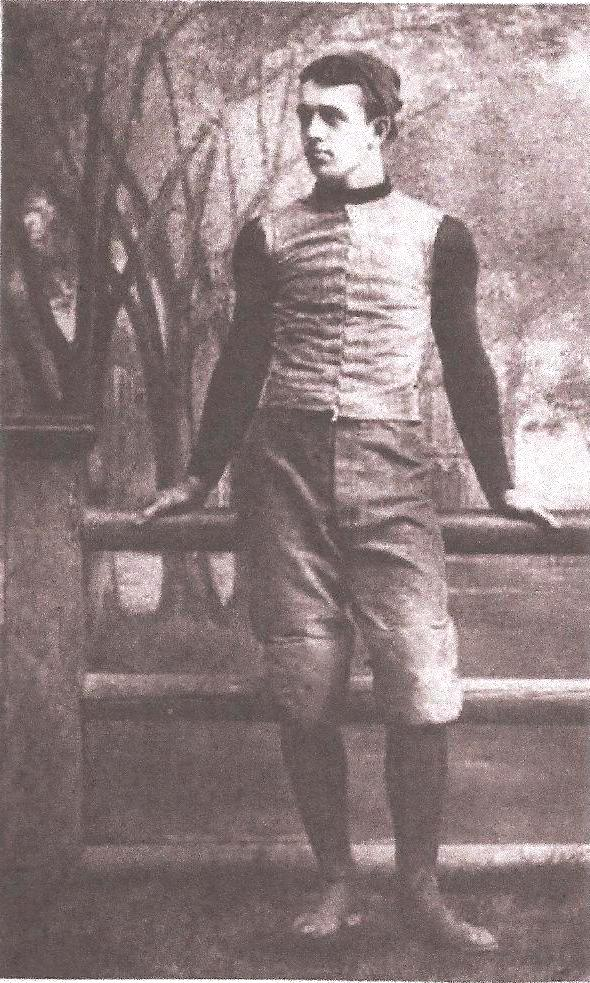
- Portrait of Rhodes from Walter Camp's 1894 book, American Football

Biographical details
- Born: July 5, 1869; Cleveland, Ohio, U.S.
- Died: February 5, 1914 (aged 44); Cleveland, Ohio, U.S.

Playing career
- 1887–1890: Yale
- 1891: Cleveland Athletic Club
- Position: Tackle

Coaching career (HC unless noted)
- 1891: Western Reserve
- 1893–1894: Yale

Head coaching record
- Overall: 32–1

Accomplishments and honors

Championships
- 1 national (1894)

Awards
- Consensus All-American (1890)

William Castle Rhodes (July 5, 1869 – February 5, 1914) was an American football player and coach. Rhodes played tackle at Yale University from 1887 to 1890 and was selected for the 1890 College Football All-America Team. After playing for the Cleveland Athletic Club and coaching at Western Reserve in 1891, Rhodes returned to his alma mater to serve as head coach for the Yale Bulldogs football team in 1893 and 1894, compiling a record of 26–1. Rhodes' 1894 team won all 16 of its games and was later recognized as a national champion by a number of selectors.

== Football player at Yale ==
A native of Cleveland, Ohio, Rhodes went east to enroll at Yale University. At Yale, he played on the 1888 Yale football team that was coached by Walter Camp and included five players who were later inducted into the College Football Hall of Fame: George Washington Woodruff, Amos Alonzo Stagg, Lee "Bum" McClung, Pudge Heffelfinger, and Pa Corbin.

Rhodes was also elected captain of the 1889 Yale football team, but he declined to serve. He was then elected, and did serve as, captain of the 1890 team. As captain of the 1890 team, Rhodes led Yale to a 32–0 win over Princeton in front of 25,000 spectators in Brooklyn. Though he was a lineman, Rhodes played an important role as a rusher in the 1890 Princeton game. He set up Yale's first touchdown with a run that took the ball to within two feet of the goal line, had another run of 30 yards, scored a touchdown and returned a punt through the Princeton line for a gain of 25 yards. One newspaper described Rhodes' reaction to the victory as follows:

"The deep frown that has mantled the face of Capt William Castle Rhodes of the Yale foot-ball eleven since Saturday, gave way to a smile this afternoon. The smile became a genuine grin, as one by one the teeth of the Princeton Tiger were drawn, until by a score of 32 to 0 the formidable beast lay helpless and humiliated."

Rhodes had a reputation as an aggressive player. In the 1889 Yale–Princeton game, Rhodes was disqualified due to rough play early in the second half. Prior to the 1890 Harvard–Yale game, one newspaper noted that Harvard's tackle would have to "look out" for Rhodes and questioned whether he could withstand "the hard knocks and blows which Yale's captain has the reputation of giving." Another newspaper focused on Rhodes' ability to cover the entire field of play: "Rhodes is an experienced and exceedingly talented player. He handles his man well, knows where to put them and literally seems to cover the whole field himself."

== Football coach at Yale ==
After graduating from Yale in 1891, Rhodes returned to his home in Cleveland where he played football in the fall of 1891. He returned to the East to serve as a referee at the November 11, 1891 Yale–Amherst game. Though Yale scored 27 points, Rhodes concluded that Yale had a lot of work to do and agreed to serve as the team's coach for the remainder of the season. He became Yale's second head football coach, following the legendary Walter Camp. The World of New York described Rhodes' return to Yale as follows:

"W.C. Rhodes, captain of last year's Yale team, came to New Haven to-day, and will coach the eleven through Thanksgiving. He saw the Amherst game this afternoon as referee and expressed himself as far from satisfied with the team's showing. He may put on a canvas jacket, as he is in good condition, having played in Cleveland through October."

He continued as a coach of the Yale team through the 1901 season.

== Cleveland Athletic Club ==
In 1891, Rhodes captained the football for the Cleveland Athletic Club. On October 31, 1891, Rhodes and Cleveland defeated the then-amateur Allegheny Athletic Association, 22–4. A second game between the two clubs was played on November 21, 1891, however Rhodes did not make the trip to Pittsburgh to play the team.

== Later years and steamship "William Castle Rhodes" ==
Rhodes later went to work for a Cleveland bank at which his father, Robert Rhodes, was president. In 1901, the Cleveland Plain Dealer reported that Robert Rhodes had acquired five steel steamers, two of which bore the names "Yale" and "William Castle Rhodes." After 15 years of service on the Great Lakes, the steamer "William Castle Rhodes" was taken to New York in 1916 to serve the Atlantic Coast.

== Head coaching record ==
Year	Team	Overall	Conference	Standing	Bowl/playoffs
Western Reserve (Ohio Intercollegiate Athletic Association) (1891)
1891	Western Reserve	6–0	4–0	1st	
Western Reserve:		6–0	4–0		
Yale Bulldogs (Independent) (1893–1894)
1893	Yale	10–1			
1894	Yale	16–0			
Yale:		26–1			
Total:		32–1			
National championship Conference title Conference division title or championship game berth
