= 1888 Penn State football team =

American college football season

1888 Penn State football
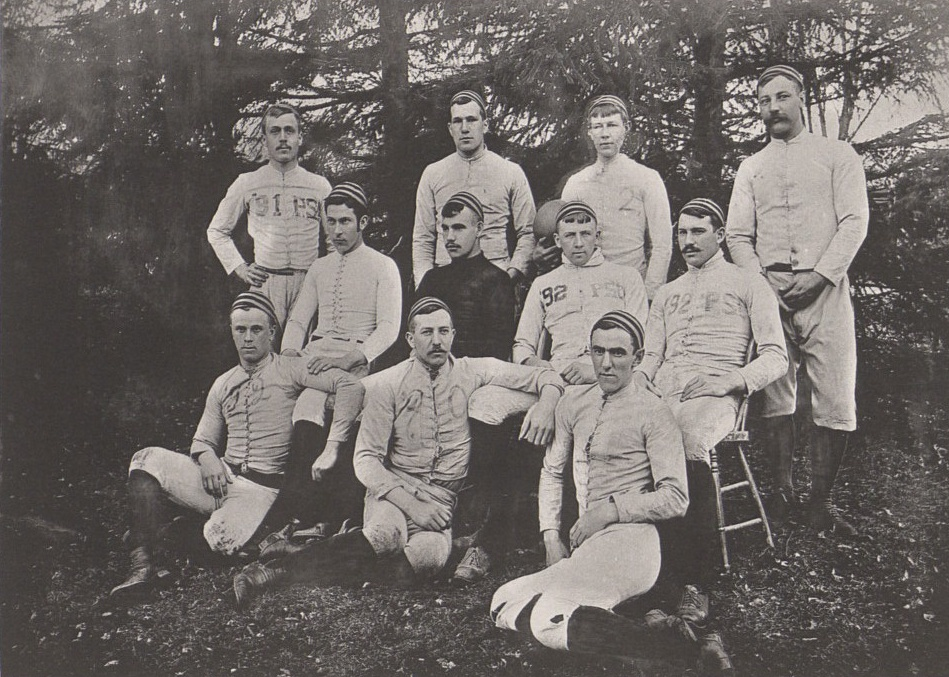
- Conference: Independent
- Record: 0–2–1
- Head coach: None
- Captain: George Linsz
- Home stadium: Old Main lawn

1888 Eastern college football independents records
	Conf.			Overall
Team	W	L	T	W		L		T
Yale		–		13	–	0	–	0
Harvard		–		12	–	1	–	0
Princeton		–		11	–	1	–	0
Lehigh		–		10	–	2	–	0
Trinity (CT)		–		5	–	1	–	1
Lafayette		–		6	–	3	–	0
Cornell		–		4	–	2	–	0
Penn		–		9	–	7	–	0
Bucknell		–		2	–	3	–	0
Fordham		–		1	–	2	–	0
Massachusetts		–		2	–	4	–	0
Wesleyan		–		2	–	7	–	0
Worcester Tech		–		1	–	4	–	0
Rutgers		–		1	–	6	–	1
Penn State		–		0	–	2	–	1
Swarthmore		–		0	–	5	–	0

The 1888 Penn State football team was an American football team that represented Pennsylvania State College—now known as Pennsylvania State University–as an independent during the 1888 college football season. The team played its home games on the Old Main lawn in University Park, Pennsylvania. The 1888 team is the only winless team in Penn State history. Harry Leyden played quarterback in 1888.

== Schedule ==
Date	Opponent	Site	Result	Source
October 31	Dickinson	Old Main lawn; State College, PA	T 6–6	
November 3	Lehigh	Old Main lawn; State College, PA	L 0–30^{‡}	
November 7	at Dickinson	Fair Grounds; Carlisle, PA	L 0–16	

^{‡}There is a score discrepancy. Lehigh lists the final score as 32–0.
