= Ralph Warren (American football) =

American football player (1871–1928)

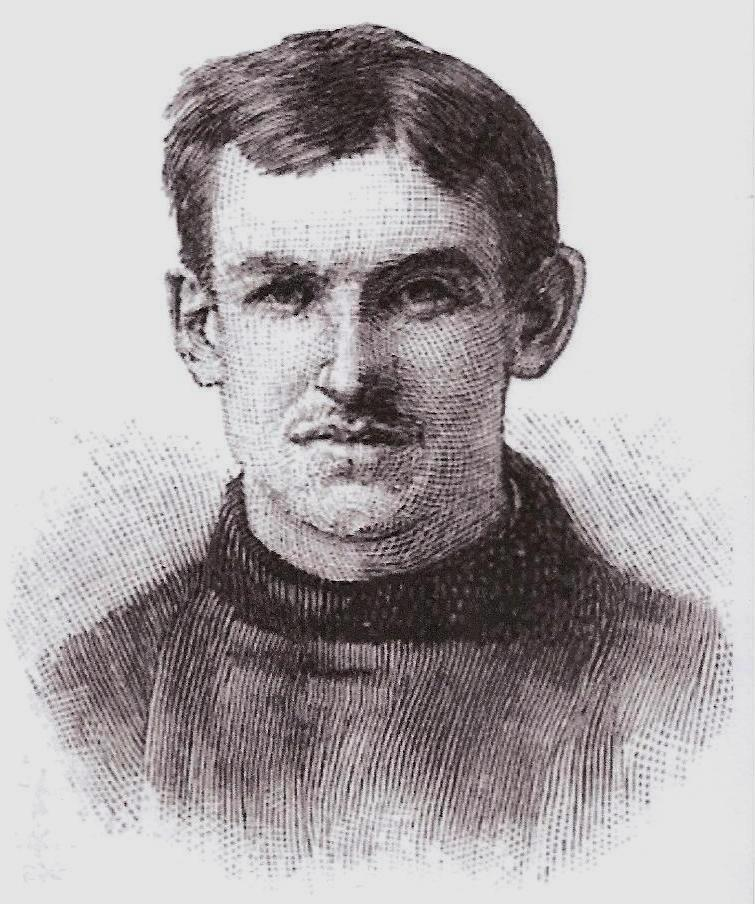
- Portrait of Warren from Walter Camp's 1894 book, "American Football"

Profile
- Position: End

Personal information
- Born: August 21, 1871; Montclair, New Jersey, U.S.
- Died: September 3, 1928 (aged 57)

Career information
- College: Princeton University (1889–1891)

Awards and highlights
- Consensus All-American (1890)

Ralph Herbert Warren (August 21, 1871 – September 3, 1928) was an All-American football player. He played end for Princeton University from 1889 to 1891 and was selected to the 1890 College Football All-America Team. Warren was the subject of intense press coverage in January 1892 when he disappeared for several days, showing up at his parents' home days later. Warren was said to have been "temporarily out of his mind" following an injury sustained in a football game.

== Biography ==
Warren was the son of a prominent New York family. He attended preparatory school at the Lawrenceville School in New Jersey where he played halfback and was captain of the school's football team.

In 1889, Warren enrolled at Princeton University. Warren was tall and thin, standing five feet, eleven inches tall, and weighing only 152 pounds. At Princeton, Warren was switched from a halfback to a left end. Despite his small size, Warren became a starter as a freshman for Princeton's football team—considered the best in the United States at the time. He began in 1889 on Princeton's freshman team but was elevated to the scrub team and then the varsity before the season's end. The following newspaper account describes Warren's quick progression to varsity:

"In his freshman year he began work by trying for his class team. His work soon caused "Snake" Ames, then captain of the Princeton eleven, to invite the smooth-faced youth to take a place at right end on the scrub team. Warren filled his position so admirably that Ames had no cause for regret when circumstances called for a new man and Warren was placed on the 'varsity team. He played in the Harvard game, but it was in the memorable battle of '89 on the Berkeley Oval that the freshman distinguished himself. Aided by Donnelly's splendid interference he dropped on the ball when McBride muffed it. Princeton thus scored four points and Warren had established his reputation."

An 1890 profile of the Princeton football team described Warren as follows:

"Ralph Herbert Warren, always called 'Pop' in college, completes the quartette of the old team. He is looked upon as one of the best end rushers now playing. A sure tackler and always well down the field on a punt, he is an invaluable man. He, too, however, has a disabled knee, and if he does not recover in time for the Yale game, it will be hard to fill his place. When he began playing last year he was only a Freshman."

Warren became a star in his sophomore season of 1890 and was rewarded with his selection as one of two ends to be named to the 1890 College Football All-America Team. Fellow end Jesse Riggs was selected as captain of the 1891 Princeton football team, but he resigned the position before the season began. After Riggs' resignation, the team voted to make Warren the team's captain as a junior. At the time, university teams did not have full-time professional coaches, and the team's captains selected the other players for the team, ran the practice sessions, formulated the plays and were the leaders of the team. Accordingly, The World of New York wrote in 1891: "The captaincy of a football team was never so important as now, and McClung of Yale, Warren of Princeton, and Trafford of Harvard are names which will be 'oft upon the lips of man' in the next two months." As captain, Warren spent much of his time in 1891 directing the team: "Capt. Warren has spent much of his time this season on the field in directing the play without taking a hand in the game. He is rather, behind, therefore, in his individual work at right end."

In November 1891, a profile of Warren was published under the headline: "Capt. Warren, of Princeton, the Great Footballist." The profile described Warren as one of the "heroes of football" and focused on his leadership role as captain of the Princeton team:

"There are critics of the game who say that Capt. Warren is too easy in his treatment his team and that he does not make the most of their ability as players. This is no reflection on the unquestionable excellence of his play as an individual member of the eleven. Warren is tall and slender. He is a painstaking and trustworthy rather than a brilliant player, and there is time yet for him to more than justify his choice as leader of the Princeton team. His thoroughness is a leading characteristic of the man."

Princeton's final game of the 1891 football season was a Thanksgiving Day game against Yale played before a crowd of 40,000 at Manhattan Field. Warren won the coin toss at the start of the game, but Princeton went down to defeat by a score of 19 to 0. In addition to having been soundly defeated, Warren was injured in the Yale game. He suffered a bruised nose and a severe twist of the neck.

In late December 1891, Warren walked out of a friend's house in Washington, D.C at 6 o'clock on a cold morning without an overcoat. He disappeared for several days, finally showing up at his parents' house in New York on New Year's Day. Warren's uncle told reporters that his nephew's story of what had happened over the past days was largely incoherent and that the family attributed his actions to his football injuries. Warren's cousin told The World of New York the following:

"In our opinion, he is temporarily out of his mind, and we will not allow anyone to see him. ... We think his mental troubles are caused by three things -- the injuries he received in the Thanksgiving Day football game, his disappointment in losing that game and his being so much behindhand in his college studies. Ever since the game he has had fits of despondency."

Warren did not return to the Princeton football team as a senior in 1892.

== See also ==
- 1890 College Football All-America Team
