= 1891 All-America college football team =

Official list of the best college football players of 1891

The 1891 All-America college football team is composed of college football players who were selected by Caspar Whitney as the best players at their positions for the 1891 college football season. Whitney began publishing his All-America team in 1889, and 1891 was the first year Whitney's list was published in Harper's Weekly.

== All-American selections for 1891 ==
=== Key ===
- CW = Caspar Whitney, published in Harper's Weekly magazine.
- **Bold** = Consensus All-American

=== Ends ===
- **Frank Hinkey**, Yale (College Football Hall of Fame) (CW)
- **John A. Hartwell**, Yale (CW)

=== Tackles ===
- **Wallace Winter**, Yale (CW)
- **Marshall Newell**, Harvard (College Football Hall of Fame) (CW)

=== Guards ===
- **Pudge Heffelfinger**, Yale (College Football Hall of Fame) (CW)
- **Jesse Riggs**, Princeton (CW)

=== Center ===
- **John Adams**, Penn (CW)

=== Quarterback ===
- **Philip King**, Princeton (College Football Hall of Fame) (CW)

=== Halfbacks ===
- **Everett J. Lake**, Harvard (later Governor of Connecticut) (CW)
- **Lee McClung**, Yale (College Football Hall of Fame) (CW)

=== Fullback ===
- **Sheppard Homans, Jr.**, Princeton (CW)
