= Henry Scott Stewart =

American football coach, lawyer, and businessman

Scott Stewart
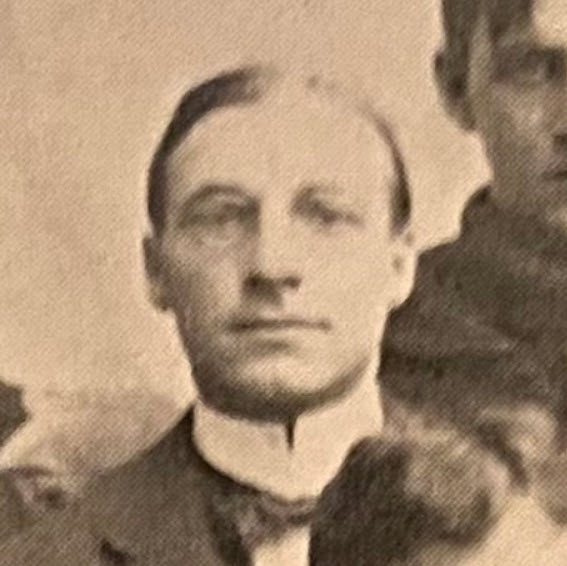

Playing career

Football
- 1891–1894: Western Reserve
- Position: Tackle

Coaching career (HC unless noted)
- 1895–1896: Kenyon
- 1897: Western Reserve

Head coaching record
- Overall: 6–11–2

Henry Scott Stewart was an American college football coach, lawyer, and businessman. He served as the head football coach at Kenyon College from 1895 to 1896 and Western Reserve University in 1897, compiling a career head coaching record of 6–11–2.

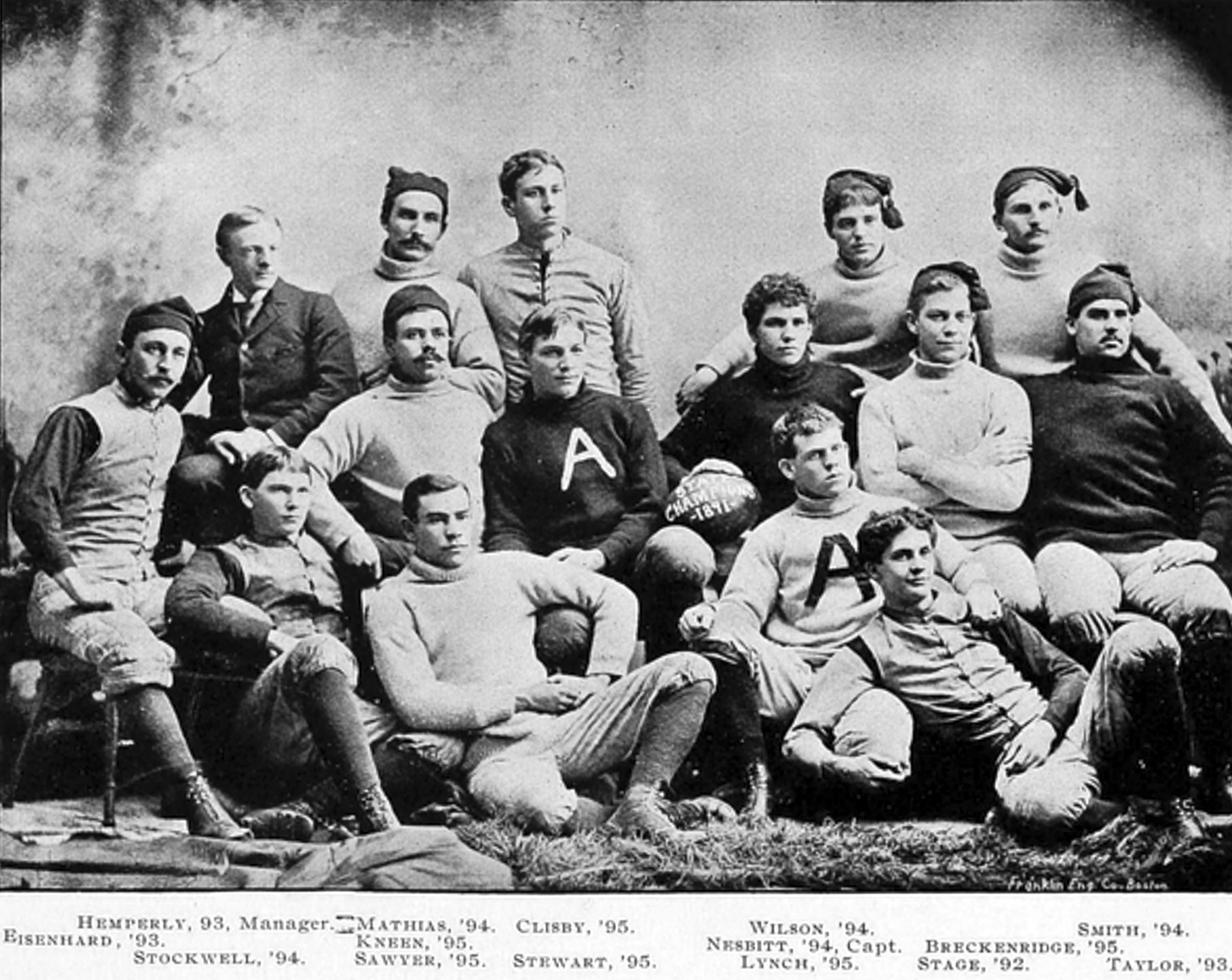
Stewart sitting in the middle with the varsity "A" in the 1891 Adelbert College of Western Reserve football team photo.

Stewart attended Cleveland's Central High School, where he was star player on the 1890 team.

Stewart played his college football at Western Reserve from 1891 to 1894, where he served as team captain of the undefeated 1894 team, coached by Charles O. Jenkins. The team went 7–0, outscoring opponents by a combined 232–8.

Capt. H. Scott Stewart illustrated in a 1894 Plain Dealer newspaper clipping of the 24–0 win over rival Case.

== Head coaching record ==
Year	Team	Overall	Conference	Standing	Bowl/playoffs
Kenyon (Independent) (1895–1896)
1895	Kenyon	2–4–1			
1896	Kenyon	2–3			
Kenyon:		4–7–1			
Western Reserve (Independent) (1897)
1897	Western Reserve	2–4–1			
Western Reserve:		2–4–1			
Total:		6–11–2			
