= 1888 Williams Ephs football team =

American college football season

1888 Williams Ephs football
- Conference: Eastern Intercollegiate Football Association
- Record: 3–5 (2–2 EIFA)
- Head coach: None
- Captain: George Hadwen Kimball
- Home stadium: Weston Field

1888 Eastern Intercollegiate Football Association standings
| | Conf. | | | | | Overall |
| Team | W | | L | | T | W | | L | | T |
|---|---|---|---|---|---|---|---|---|---|---|
| Boston Tech + | 3 | – | 1 | – | 0 | 6 | – | 5 | – | 0 |
| Dartmouth + | 3 | – | 1 | – | 0 | 3 | – | 4 | – | 0 |
| Williams | 2 | – | 2 | – | 0 | 3 | – | 5 | – | 0 |
| Stevens | 1 | – | 2 | – | 0 | 2 | – | 7 | – | 1 |
| Amherst | 0 | – | 3 | – | 0 | 2 | – | 8 | – | 1 |
+ – Conference co-champions

The 1888 Williams Ephs football team represented the Williams College as a member of the Eastern Intercollegiate Football Association (EIFA) during the 1888 college football season. Williams compiled an overall record of 3–5 with a mark of 2–2 in conference play, tying for third place in the EIFA. The team played home games at Weston Field in Williamstown, Massachusetts.

== Schedule ==
| Date | Time | Opponent | Site | Result | Source |
|---|---|---|---|---|---|
| October 20 | | Yale* | Williamstown, MA | L 0–30 | |
| October 24 | | Harvard* | Williamstown, MA | L 6–14 | |
| October 27 | | at Cornell* | Ithaca, NY | L 0–20 | |
| November 3 | | Rutgers* | Williamstown, MA | W 48–0 | |
| November 7 | | at Amherst | Amherst, MA (rivalry) | W 53–0 | |
| November 14 | 2:50 p.m. | at Dartmouth | Hanover, NH | L 6–36 | |
| November 17 | | Stevens | Weston Field; Williamstown, MA | W 42–4 | |
| November 21 | 3:05 p.m. | at Boston Tech | Union Grounds; Boston, MA | L 0–22 | |
*Non-conference game
