= Sheppard Homans Jr. =

American football player (1871–1952)

Shep Homans
Profile
- Position: Fullback

Personal information
- Born: September 24, 1871; Englewood, New Jersey, U.S.
- Died: March 30, 1952 (aged 80); Charleston, South Carolina, U.S.

Career information
- College: Princeton (1889–1891)

Awards and highlights
- 2× Consensus All-American (1890, 1891)

Sheppard "Shep" Homans Jr. (September 24, 1871 – March 30, 1952) was an All-American football player and insurance executive. He was selected as an All-American at the fullback position while playing for Princeton University in both 1890 and 1891.

== Early life ==
Homans grew up in Englewood, New Jersey, where his father, Sheppard Homans Sr., was prominent in the life insurance business. His father was the founder and president of the Provident Savings Life Assurance Company.

== All-American at Princeton ==
Homans attended Princeton University. He played fullback for Princeton's varsity football team, taking the place of Knowlton "Snake" Ames—who was considered one of the greatest running backs in the early days of the game. When Homans took over for Ames, one newspaper noted: "Sheppard Homans, Jr., of Englewood, N.J., is the man who will fill 'Snake' Ames' position as fullback. He is at times a little slow, but he is a sure drop kicker and a hard punter."

Homans later recalled sitting on the sidelines in 1889 and then having his chance to start in 1890:

Snake never gave me a chance to play a minute ... I had my chance in 1890. I only weighed 164 pounds but I played 11 games for Princeton and my sub never got into a game. Every minute of each battle—and I can tell you there were many injuries in a rough game. The next year I again played every minute of every game through 11 games. This makes 22 games and not missing a second of play.

Homans proved to be a capable replacement for Ames, serving as Princeton's fullback from 1890 to 1892. He was selected as an All-American in both 1890 and 1891. A December 1892 profile of the Princeton team said of Homans: "Sheppard Homans, the team's full back, is a New Jersey boy and lives at Englewood. He runs and dodges with great skill and is one of 'Old Nassau's' best men. His age is 21, his height 5 ft. 9 in. and his weight 160 pounds."

Homans later became friends with the noted sports writer Grantland Rice. When Homans died in 1952, Rice paid tribute to Homans as a legend of the game:

A few days ago an old friend of mine died. Just as Ty Cobb represents the ball game of many years ago, this man represented the football that used to be. This friend's name was Shep Homans, Princeton's All-America fullback in 1890 and 1891 ... Shep Homans was a product of earlier football. As an example he had four times as much fun as the modern breed have, if they happen to like action, and he kept in better physical shape for some 60 years. He played in an entirely different game.

== Semi-professional football ==
After graduating from Princeton, Homans played semi-professional football for the Tenakill Outing Club. An article from The Philadelphia Inquirer in 1893 noted that Homans' punts and long runs were the features of a 12–0 victory over the Crescent Athletic Club.

== Tennis and golf champion ==
Homans also became a competitive tennis player and golfer. In 1903, he won the indoor singles tennis championship in New York. And in 1929 he won the senior golf championship in Pinehurst, North Carolina.

== Family and business career ==
In April 1901, Homans married Loraine Eleanor Vanderpool, daughter of one of Newark's wealthiest citizens, at Trinity Episcopal Church in Newark, New Jersey. Their son, Gene Homans, was a championship golfer and tennis players in the 1920s and 1930s.

Homans later went into the life insurance business and was a partner in Prosser & Homans in New York, general agents for Equitable Life Assurance Society of America. In September 1920, a bomb was set off on Wall Street by "American anarchist fighters" who, prior to the bombing, sent a postcard to Homans that read, "Dear Shep: Keep away from Wall Street this Wednesday afternoon. There never was a road that didn't have a turn."

Homans was a resident of Englewood, New Jersey throughout his life. He died at a hospital in Charleston, South Carolina.
