= 1888 Worcester Tech football team =

American college football season

1888 Worcester Tech football
- Conference: Independent
- Record: 2–5
- Head coach: None

1888 Eastern college football independents records
	Conf.			Overall
Team	W	L	T	W		L		T
Yale		–		13	–	0	–	0
Harvard		–		12	–	1	–	0
Princeton		–		11	–	1	–	0
Lehigh		–		10	–	2	–	0
Trinity (CT)		–		5	–	1	–	1
Lafayette		–		6	–	3	–	0
Cornell		–		4	–	2	–	0
Penn		–		9	–	7	–	0
Bucknell		–		2	–	3	–	0
Fordham		–		1	–	2	–	0
Massachusetts		–		2	–	5	–	0
Worcester Tech		–		2	–	5	–	0
Wesleyan		–		2	–	7	–	0
Rutgers		–		1	–	6	–	1
Penn State		–		0	–	2	–	1
Swarthmore		–		0	–	5	–	0

The 1888 Worcester Tech football team was an American football team that represented Worcester Polytechnic Institute in the 1888 college football season. The team compiled a record of 2–5.

== Schedule ==
Date	Time	Opponent	Site	Result	Attendance	Source
October 6		Harvard	Worcester, MA	L 0–70	4,000	
October 13		at Trinity (CT)	Hartford, CT	L 4–8		
October 27		at Harvard	Holmes Field; Cambridge, MA	L 0–68		
November 3		Massachusetts	Worcester, MA	W 49–0		
November 10		Trinity (CT)	Worcester, MA	W 6–0		
November 17		at Boston Tech	Union Grounds; Boston, MA	L 0–24		
November 24	3:10 p.m.	at Wesleyan	Middletown, CT	L 4–24		
