= 1895 All-America college football team =

List of the best college football players of 1895

The 1895 All-America college football team is composed of college football players who were selected as All-Americans for the 1895 college football season, as selected by Caspar Whitney for Harper's Weekly and Walter Camp. Whitney began publishing his All-America Team in 1889, and his list, which was considered the official All-America Team, was published in Harper's Weekly from 1891 to 1896.

An All-America team was also published by New York newspaper The Sun.

== All-American selections for 1895 ==
=== Key ===
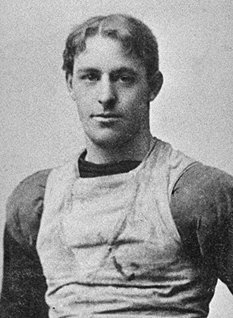
Charles Gelbert of Penn.

- WC = Walter Camp Football Foundation
- CW = Caspar Whitney, published in Harper's Weekly magazine.
- **Bold** = Consensus All-American

=== Ends ===
- **Norman Cabot**, Harvard (WC-1; CW-1)
- **Charles Gelbert**, Penn (College Football Hall of Fame) (WC-1; CW-1)

=== Tackles ===
- **Langdon Lea**, Princeton (College Football Hall of Fame) (WC-1; CW-1)
- **Fred T. Murphy**, Yale (WC-1; CW-1)

=== Guards ===
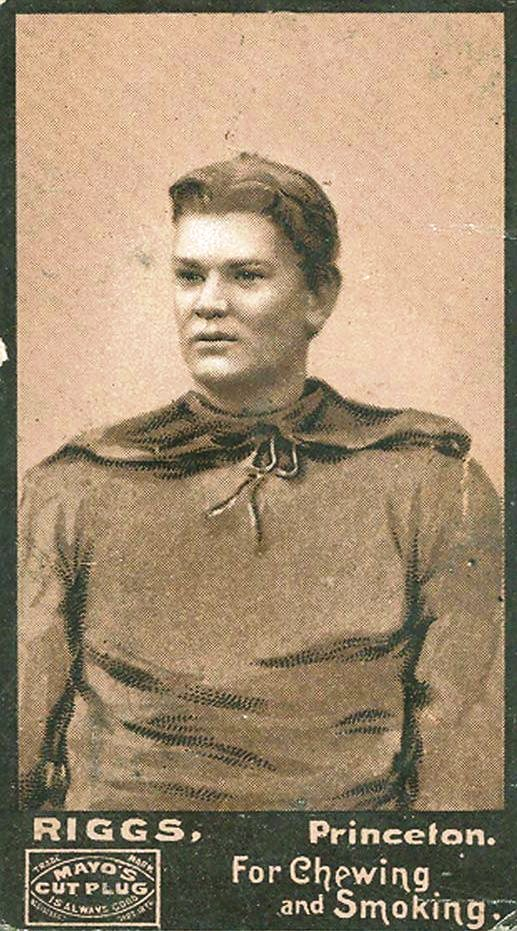
Dudley Riggs of Princeton

- **Charles Wharton**, Penn (College Football Hall of Fame) (WC-1; CW-1)
- **Dudley Riggs**, Princeton (WC-1; CW-1)

=== Centers ===
- **Alfred E. Bull**, Penn (WC-1; CW-1)

=== Quarterback ===
- **Clint Wyckoff**, Cornell (College Football Hall of Fame) (WC-1; CW-1)

=== Halfbacks ===
George H. Brooke of Penn

- **Sam Thorne**, Yale (College Football Hall of Fame) (WC-1; CW-1)
- **George H. Brooke**, Penn (College Football Hall of Fame) (WC-1; CW-1)

=== Fullback ===
- **Charley Brewer**, Harvard (College Football Hall of Fame) (WC-1; CW-1)
