= 1888 Harvard Crimson football team =

American college football season

1888 Harvard Crimson football
- Conference: Independent
- Record: 12–1
- Head coach: None
- Home stadium: Jarvis Field, Holmes Field

1888 Eastern college football independents records
	Conf.			Overall
Team	W	L	T	W		L		T
Yale		–		13	–	0	–	0
Harvard		–		12	–	1	–	0
Princeton		–		11	–	1	–	0
Lehigh		–		10	–	2	–	0
Trinity (CT)		–		5	–	1	–	1
Lafayette		–		6	–	3	–	0
Cornell		–		4	–	2	–	0
Penn		–		9	–	7	–	0
Bucknell		–		2	–	3	–	0
Fordham		–		1	–	2	–	0
Massachusetts		–		2	–	4	–	0
Wesleyan		–		2	–	7	–	0
Worcester Tech		–		1	–	4	–	0
Rutgers		–		1	–	6	–	1
Penn State		–		0	–	2	–	1
Swarthmore		–		0	–	5	–	0

The 1888 Harvard Crimson football team represented Harvard University in the 1888 college football season. They finished with a 12–1 record. The team outscored its opponents 631–32, including a 102–0 victory over Amherst on November 3. The Crimson suffered its sole loss, to Princeton, losing by an 18–6 score on November 17. Two days later, Harvard defeated the Penn by a 48–0 score.

== Schedule ==
Date	Time	Opponent	Site	Result	Attendance	Source
October 6		at Worcester Tech	Worcester, MA	W 70–0	4,000	
October 13	3:08 p.m.	Boston Tech	Jarvis Field; Cambridge, MA	W 18–0		
October 17		at Phillips Exeter	Exeter, NH	W 39–6		
October 20		at Wesleyan	Middletown, CT	W 34–0		
October 24		at Williams	Williamstown, MA	W 14–6		
October 25		at Andover	Andover, MA	W 66–0		
October 27		Worcester Tech	Holmes Field; Cambridge, MA	W 68–0		
October 30		Dartmouth	Holmes Field; Cambridge, MA (rivalry)	W 74–0		
October 31		Boston Tech	Jarvis Field; Cambridge, MA	W 42–0		
November 3		Amherst	Cambridge, MA	W 102–0		
November 10		Wesleyan	Jarvis Field; Cambridge, MA	W 50–2		
November 17		at Princeton	Princeton, NJ (rivalry)	L 6–18		
November 19	3:10 p.m.	at Penn	Philadelphia, PA (rivalry)	W 48–0	300	
