= 1891 Western Reserve football team =

American college football season

1891 Western Reserve football
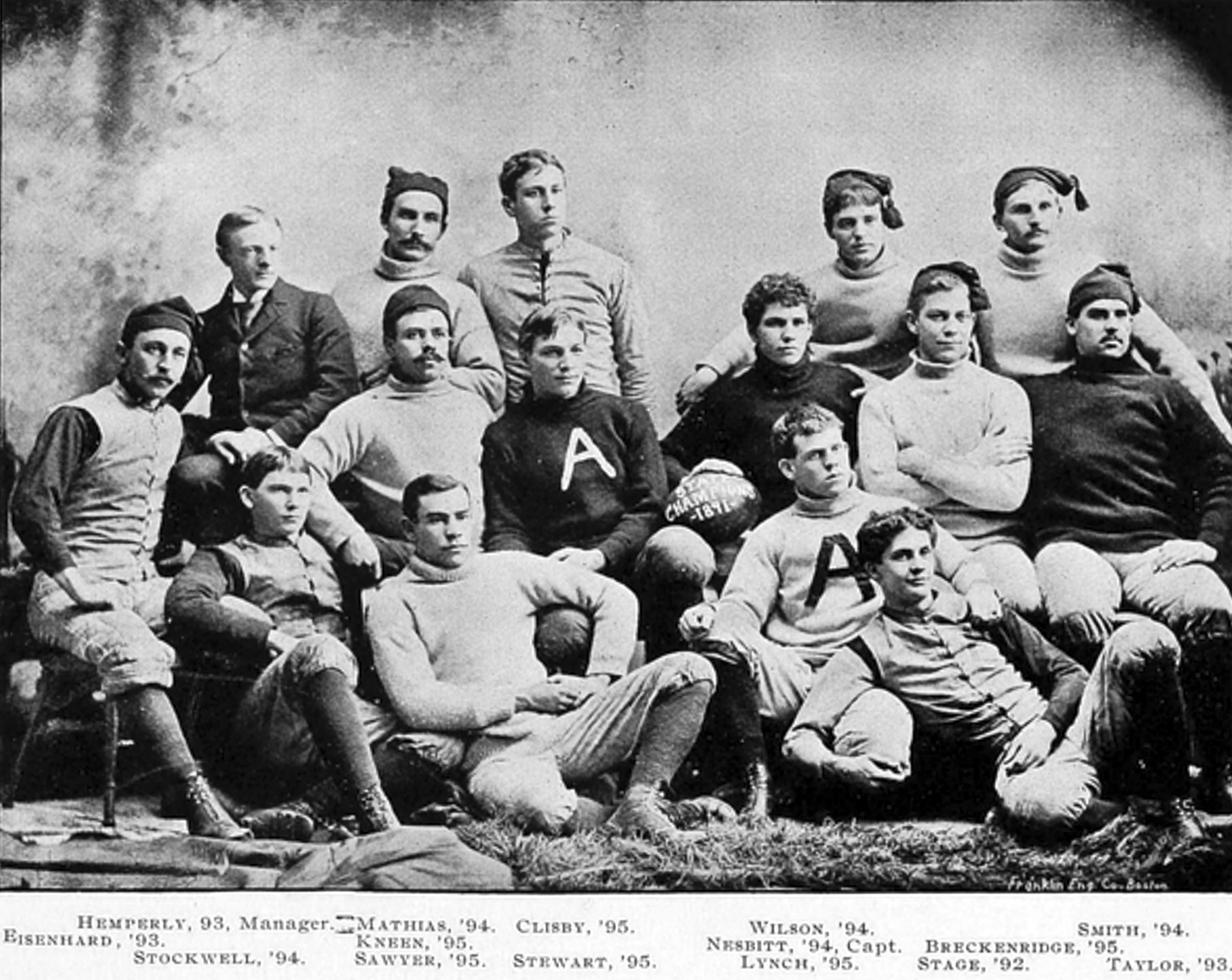

OIAA champion
- Conference: Ohio Intercollegiate Athletic Association
- Record: 6–1 (4–0 OIAA)
- Head coach: William Rhodes & Edward M. Tillinghast (1st season)

The 1891 Western Reserve football team represented Adelbert College of Western Reserve University—now known as Case Western Reserve University—in the American city of Cleveland, Ohio, during the 1891 college football season. The team outscored opponents by a combined 160–42, led by star players Billy Stage and Tug Wilson. Also playing end for the team was Scott Stewart. In the short lived conference, the team was a perfect 4–0 in the Ohio Intercollegiate Athletic Association.

During the final game of the season, in the first ever match up against rival Case School of Applied Science, William Rhodes of Yale and Edward M. Tillinghast of the Cleveland Athletic Club, were the team's first ever coaches.

== Schedule ==
1891 Ohio college football conference standings.

Date	Opponent	Site	Result	Attendance	Source
October 31	at Oberlin*	Oberlin, OH	L 6–12		
November 11	at Ohio State	Recreation Park; Columbus, OH	W 58–6		
November 12	at Denison	Granville, OH	W 14–10		
November 21	Oberlin*	C. A. C. Park; Cleveland, OH	W 18–8	300	
November 26	Kenyon	YMCA Park; Cleveland, OH	W 42–6	1,200	
December 1	Buchtel	Cleveland, OH	W forfeit		
December 20	Case*	YMCA Park; Cleveland, OH	W 22–0	1,000	
*Non-conference game
