= Frank Hallowell =

American football player and coach (1870–1933)

- c. 1918

Biographical details
- Born: August 12, 1870; Medford, Massachusetts, U.S.
- Died: June 1, 1933 (aged 62); Boston, Massachusetts, U.S.
- Education: Harvard University

Playing career
- 1889–1892: Harvard
- Position: End

Coaching career (HC unless noted)
- 1893–1901: Harvard (assistant)

Accomplishments and honors

Awards
- Consensus All-American (1890, 1892)

Frank Walton Hallowell (August 12, 1870 – June 1, 1933) was an All-American football player and coach. He played at the end position for the Harvard Crimson football team of Harvard University, and was twice selected as an All-American, in 1890 and 1892. He was also a center fielder on Harvard's baseball team.

== Playing career ==
=== Football ===
At Harvard, c. 1893

Hallowell played end for the Harvard football team from 1889 to 1892. In 1890, a newspaper profile of the Harvard team noted that Hallowell's play on defense was not yet up to his offense:

Hallowell, at the right end, is showing up fairly well. He still allows himself to be drawn in toward the center and is apt to overrun his man. A more thorough study of his position will enable him to direct his efforts to a better advantage. He has yet to learn that a man in his position must be as able to gain ground as to prevent others from gaining it.

Despite the criticism of his defense, Hallowell played well enough on offense to be picked as one of two ends on the 1890 College Football All-America Team.

Before the start of the 1891 football season, The New York Times wrote of Hallowell: "Hallowell was the most promising of the new players last year, and put up a splendid game when he appeared on the field. He is quick, strong, a very fast runner, and a close imitator of Cumnock in his tackling." However, Hallowell sustained a knee injury and was "laid up nearly the whole of the [1891] season."

=== Baseball ===
Hallowell also played baseball for Harvard as a center fielder. He was known for both his hitting and fielding. In June 1892, Hallowell was involved in a play that resulted in a serious injury to Yale's catcher Carter. While trying to score, Hallowell "had a terrific collision with Carter at the plate." Despite being knocked unconscious and having his nose broken in the collision, Carter insisted on playing in the next inning. Later in the game, Carter became "delirious and weak" and was taken to a Boston hotel where he was in critical condition. Newspapers reported that Carter "has been insane ever since the accident."

While at Harvard, Hallowell played summer baseball in what is now the Cape Cod Baseball League. In 1891 and 1892, Hallowell was a player/manager for the South Yarmouth team, where he was praised for his "fine work, and especially his system of coaching." In 1893, he played for the Osterville town team, where it was reported that Hallowell "always plays an errorless game."

== Coaching career ==
After graduating from Harvard, Hallowell remained affiliated with Harvard's football team as coach from during the period from 1893 through at least 1901.

== Personal ==
Hallowell always remained a fierce supporter of Harvard's football team. When Hallowell was married, the congregation in the "sedate" Boston church gasped when he knelt at the altar. On the sole of his left shoe was written "To hell", and on the right was written "With Yale!"
