= 1888 Amherst football team =

American college football season

1888 Amherst football
- Conference: Eastern Intercollegiate Football Association
- Record: 2–8–1 (0–3 EIFA)
- Head coach: None

1888 Eastern Intercollegiate Football Association standings
	Conf.					Overall
Team	W		L		T	W		L		T
Boston Tech +	3	–	1	–	0	6	–	5	–	0
Dartmouth +	3	–	1	–	0	3	–	4	–	0
Williams	2	–	2	–	0	3	–	5	–	0
Stevens	1	–	2	–	0	2	–	7	–	1
Amherst	0	–	3	–	0	2	–	8	–	1
+ – Conference co-champions

The 1888 Amherst football team represented the Amherst College as a member of the Eastern Intercollegiate Football Association (EIFA) during the 1888 college football season. Amherst compiled an overall record of 2–8–1 with a mark of 0–3 in conference play, placing last out of five teams in the EIFA.

== Schedule ==
Date	Time	Opponent	Site	Result	Source
October 6		at Wesleyan*	Middletown, CT	L 0–54 or 0–62	
October 18		Massachusetts*	Amherst, MA	W 58–0	
October 19	3:20 p.m.	Yale*	Amherst, MA	L 0–39	
October 27	2:00 p.m.	at Boston Tech	Union Grounds; Boston, MA	L 0–48	
October 30		at Massachusetts*	Alumni Field; Amherst, MA	W 45–4	
October 31		vs. Trinity (CT)	Springfield, MA	T 0–0	
November 3		at Harvard*	Jarvis Field; Cambridge, MA	L 0–102	
November 7		Williams	Amherst, MA (rivalry)	L 0–53	
November 10		at Yale*	Yale Field; New Haven, CT	L 0–70	
November 14		at Trinity (CT)*	Ward Street grounds; Hartford, CT	L 0–16	
November 21		at Dartmouth	Amherst, MA	L 0–40	
*Non-conference game
