= Herbert F. Raynolds =

American judge (1874/75–1950)

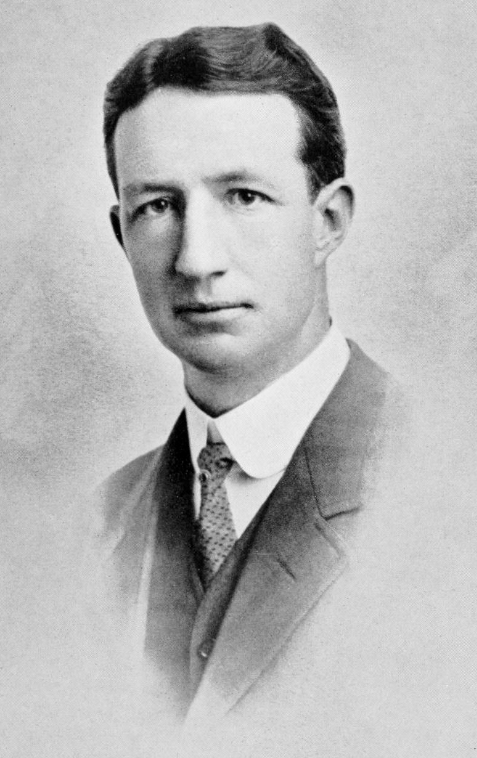

Herbert Frederick Raynolds (November 28, 1874 or 1875 – December 22, 1950) was a justice of the New Mexico Supreme Court from January 1, 1919 until his resignation on December 26, 1922.

== Biography ==
Born in Central City, Colorado to Joshua S. and Sara (Robbins) Raynolds, his father having established the Central Bank of Las Vegas. Raynolds graduated from Harvard College in 1897 and from Columbia Law School in 1902. He was admitted to practice in the Territory of New Mexico in 1902, becoming treasurer of the Occidental Life Insurance Company. He was a delegate to the New Mexico State Constitutional Convention held in Santa Fe, New Mexico from 1910 to 1911. On November 7, 1911, he was elected first judge of 2nd Judicial District under the newly formed State government.

In 1918, Raynolds pursued an elected seat on the New Mexico Supreme Court, running as a Republican against former Progressive Republican-turned Democrat Richard H. Hanna. Raynolds prevailed by just over 1,000 votes. Raynolds resigned from the court in 1922, shortly after the 1922 election effected substantial changes to the composition of the court.

In October 1945, Raynolds was identified as one of the few remaining living members of the 1910-1911 constitutional convention, and was noted to be living in California. He died at his home in Los Angeles on December 22, 1950. His sister Sarame Raynolds was an opera singer in the 1910s.

Political offices
Preceded by Richard H. Hanna	Justice of the New Mexico Supreme Court; 1919–1922	Succeeded by Clarence M. Botts
