= 1890 All-America college football team =

Official list of the best college football players of 1890

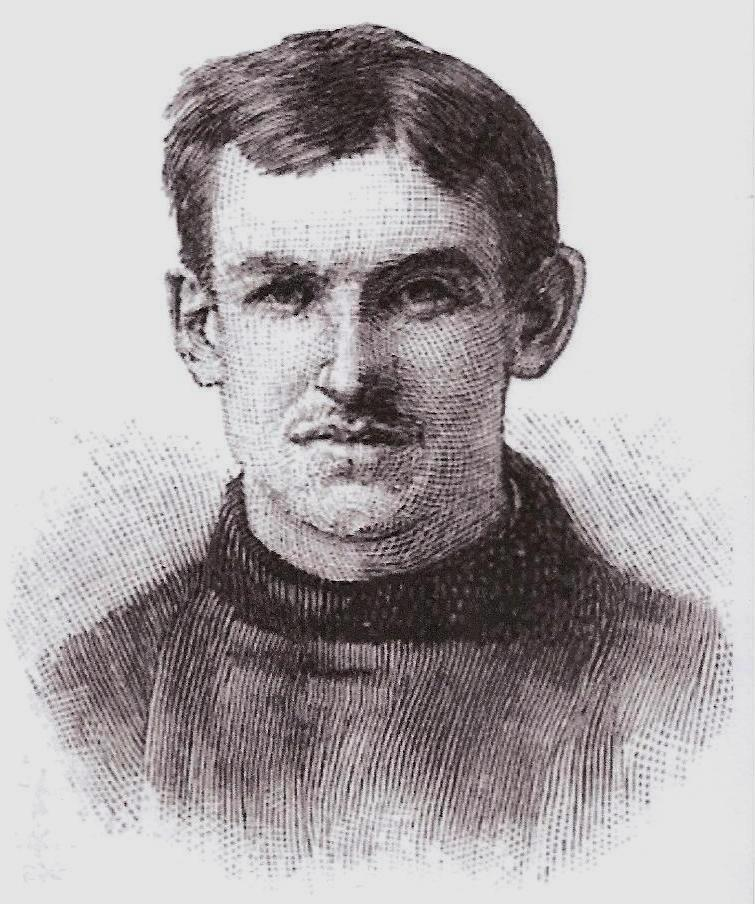
Princeton end Ralph Warren suffered a mental breakdown after an 1891 loss to Yale.

The 1890 All-America college football team was the second All-America college football team. The team was selected by Caspar Whitney and published in This Week's Sports.

== Overview ==
All eleven members of the 1890 All-America team played for three teams—Harvard, Princeton or Yale, then known as the "Big Three" of college football. Some sources indicate that Walter Camp assisted Whitney with the selection of the 1890 All-American team, while others indicate that Camp did not become involved in the selection process until some time in the early 1890s.

"Bum" McClung's signature as used on U.S. currency

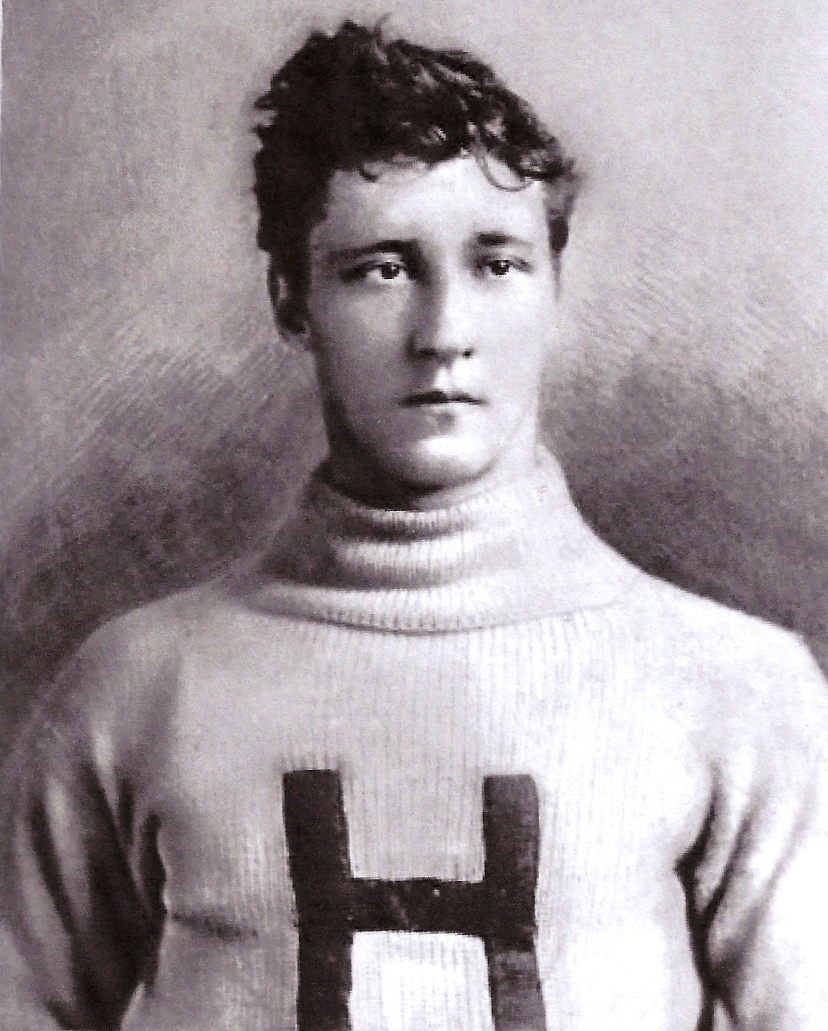
Harvard tackle "Ma" Newell was run over by a railroad engine on Christmas Eve 1897.

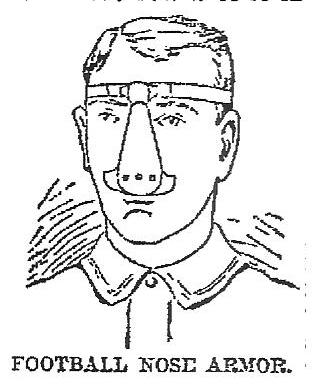
Football's first protective face gear, "nose armor," was developed to protect Harvard's John Cranston.

The 1890 All-America team included three players who were later inducted into the College Football Hall of Fame: Harvard's great tackle Marshall "Ma" Newell, Yale's guard Pudge Heffelfinger, and Yale's halfback Thomas "Bum" McClung.

The strength of the 1890 team is demonstrated by the fact that a majority of the players selected (seven of eleven) were selected as All-Americans in multiple years. They are: Pudge Heffelfinger (1889, 1890 and 1891), John Corbett (1889 and 1890), Marshall Newell (1890 and 1891), Frank Hallowell (1890 and 1892), Jesse Riggs (1890 and 1891), "Bum" McClung (1890 and 1891), and Sheppard Homans (1890 and 1891).

The team included men who went on to great success in their careers. McClung went on to become the Treasurer of the United States under U.S. President William Howard Taft, and his signature appears on U.S. currency issued during the years 1909 through 1912. Heffelfinger became the first "professional" football player in 1892 when he was paid $25 for his expenses and a bonus of $500 by the Allegheny Athletic Association to play in a game against the rival Pittsburgh Athletic Club. Harvard's quarterback Dudley Dean enlisted in Teddy Roosevelt's Rough Riders and was decorated for his role in the Battle of San Juan Hill.

The team also included players who met with tragic endings. Newell was killed on Christmas Eve 1897 when a railroad engine accidentally backed up over him. Princeton's end Ralph Warren suffered a severely twisted neck in the 1891 Princeton-Yale game and wandered off several weeks later, having reportedly suffered a mental breakdown as a combined result of the injury and despondency over the loss to Yale.

Football in 1890 was a brutal sport, played before the introduction of helmets and other protective gear. Serious injuries and even deaths were common occurrences in the game. Harvard's All-American center, John Cranston, was the first player to wear equipment to protect his face during an American football game. In order to protect Cranston's "weak nose," Harvard captain and 1889 All-American Arthur Cumnock invented a device that he called "nose armor." Cumnock's invention gained popularity, and in 1892, a newspaper article described the growing popularity of the device:

"By the invention of nose armor football players who have been hitherto barred from the field because of broken or weak noses are now able to thrust an armor protected nose (even though it be broken) into the center of the roughest scrimmage without danger to the sensitive nasal organ. The armor is made of fine rubber and protects both the nose and teeth."

In 1952, Grantland Rice paid tribute to Princeton's fullback Sheppard Homans as the embodiment of the rough and tumble days of iron man football. Rice wrote: "Just as Ty Cobb represents the ball game of many years ago, this man represented the football that used to be."

== All-American selections for 1890 ==
=== Ends ===
- Frank Hallowell, Harvard
- Ralph Warren, Princeton

=== Tackles ===
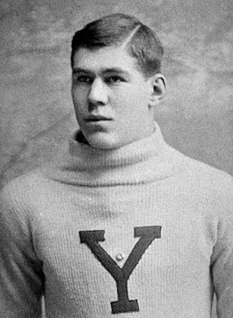
Yale guard Pudge Heffelfinger became the first "professional" football player when he was paid a $500 bonus to play football.

- Marshall Newell, Harvard (College Football Hall of Fame)
- William Rhodes, Yale

=== Guards ===
- Pudge Heffelfinger, Yale (College Football Hall of Fame)
- Jesse Riggs, Princeton

=== Centers ===
- John Cranston, Harvard

=== Quarterbacks ===
- Dudley Dean, Harvard

=== Halfbacks ===
- Lee McClung, Yale (College Football Hall of Fame)
- John J. Corbett, Harvard

=== Fullbacks ===
- Sheppard Homans, Jr., Princeton

== Gallery of 1890 All-Americans ==
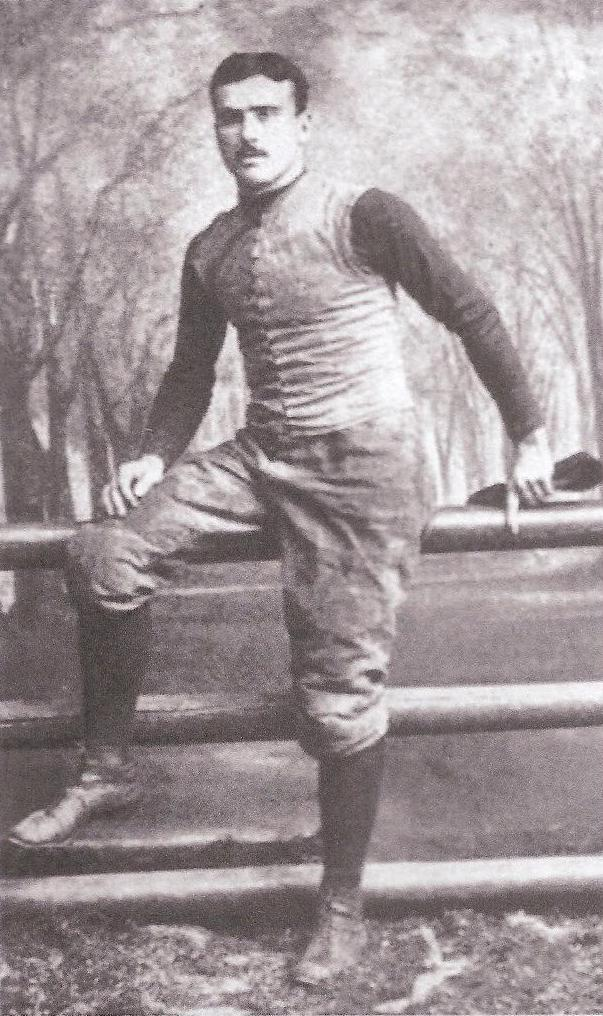
Yale halfback Lee McClung later served as the Treasurer of the United States

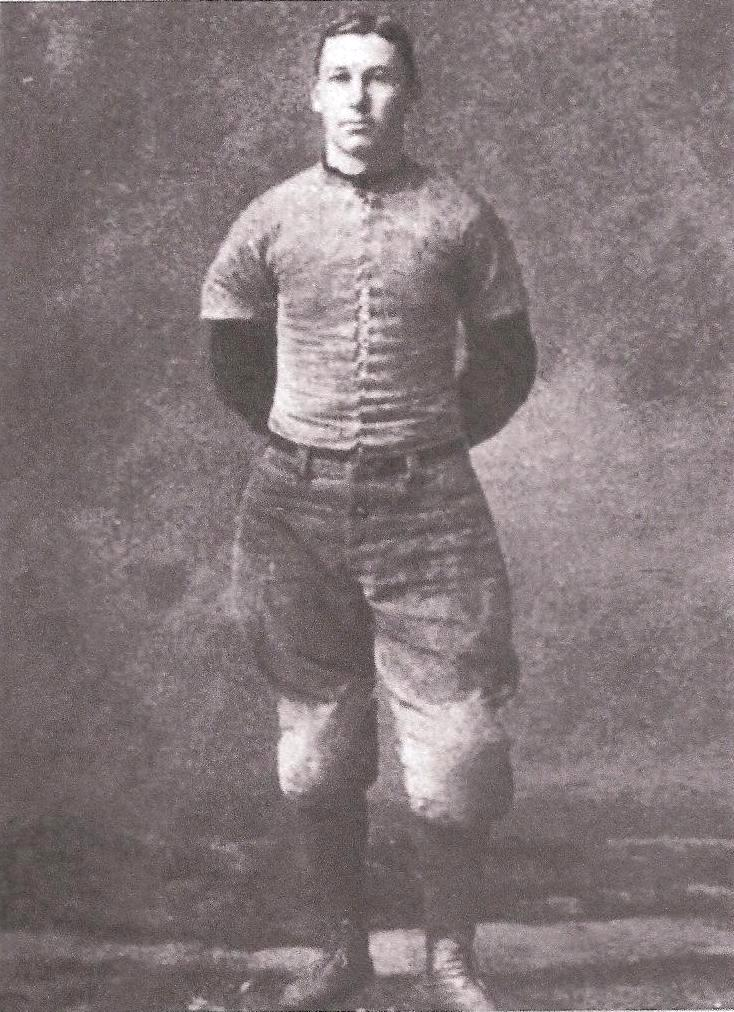
Harvard halfback John Corbett later became known as Wyoming's "Grand Old Man of Athletics."

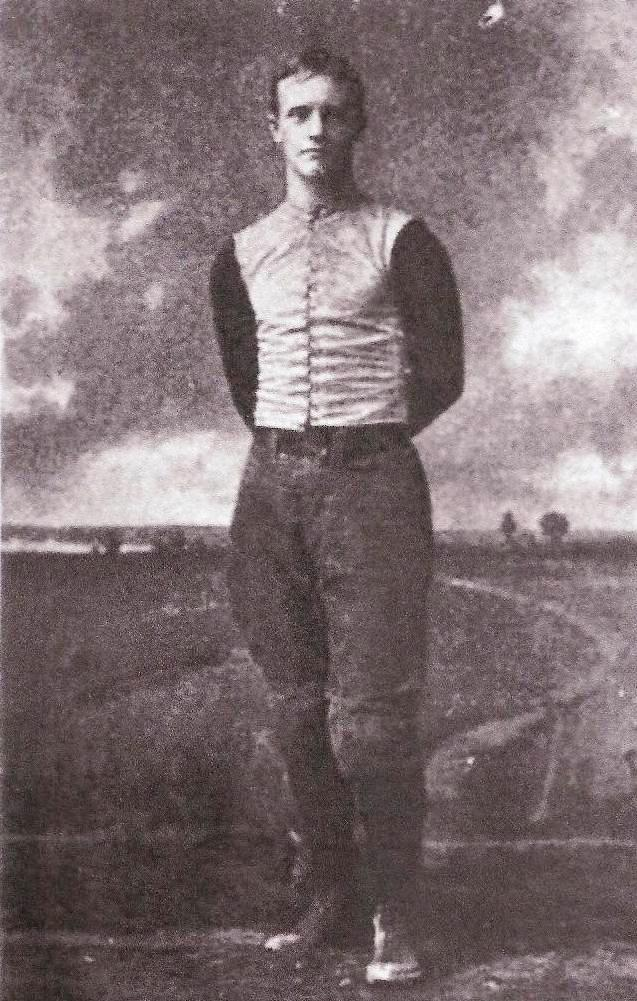
Harvard quarterback Dudley Dean charged up San Juan Hill with Teddy Roosevelt's Rough Riders.
