= William P. Graves =

American football coach

Coaching career (HC unless noted)
- 1891: North Carolina

Head coaching record
- Overall: 0–0

William P. Graves was an American college football coach. He was hired as head football coach at the University of North Carolina at Chapel Hill when the team resumed playing at the beginning of 1891. Although there was a game scheduled for February 14, 1891 at Wake Forest, it was postponed to the 21st due to members of the Wake Forest team contracting the measles. However, on the eve of the game Wake Forest canceled.

== Head coaching record ==
| Year | Team | Overall | Conference | Standing |
|---|---|---|---|---|
North Carolina Tar Heels (Independent) (1891)
| 1891 | North Carolina | 0–0 | | |
| North Carolina: | | 0–0 | | |
| Total: | | 0–0 | | |
