= Jesse Riggs =

American football player (1870–1945)

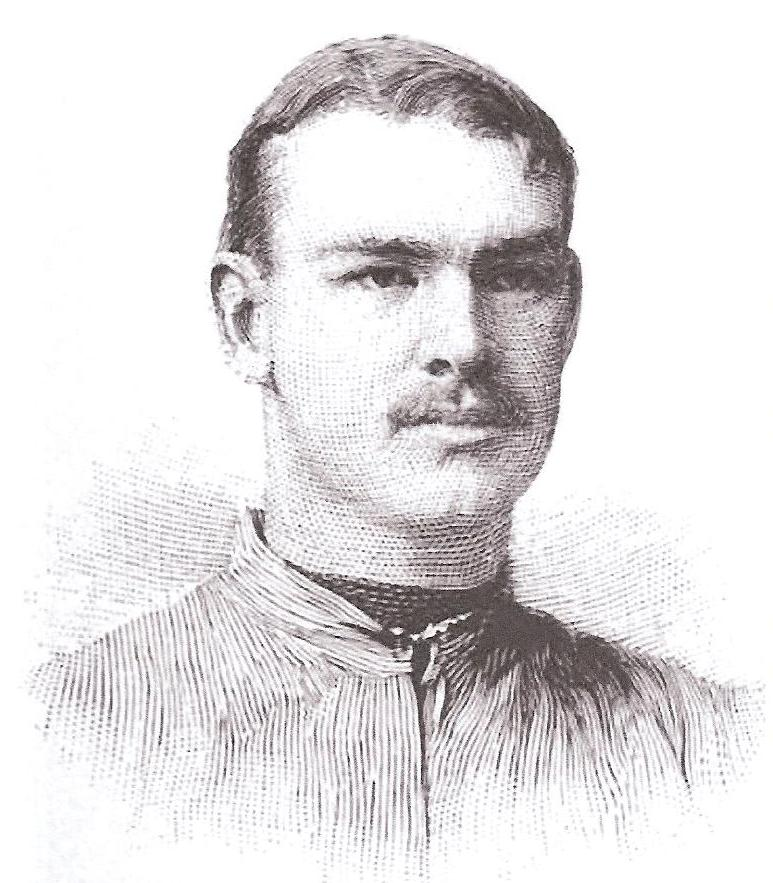
- Portrait of Jesse Riggs from Walter Camp's 1894 book, "American football"

Profile
- Position: Guard

Personal information
- Born: February 3, 1870; Baltimore, Maryland, U.S.
- Died: March 9, 1945 (aged 75); Baltimore, Maryland, U.S.

Career information
- College: Princeton (1888–1891)

Awards and highlights
- 2× Consensus All-American (1890, 1891)

Jesse Bright Riggs (February 3, 1870 – March 9, 1945) was an All-American football player. Riggs played for the Princeton University football team from 1888 to 1891. He was an All-American in 1890 and captain of the 1891 Princeton football team.

== Biography ==
A native of Baltimore, Maryland, Riggs was the son of Lawrason Riggs, a well-known banker of Baltimore, Maryland. The family had founded and operated Riggs Bank, which financed Samuel Morse's invention of the telegraph in 1845 and lent $16 million to the United States to fund the Mexican–American War.

Riggs enrolled at Princeton University where he played at the halfback and right guard positions from 1888 to 1891. He was selected to the 1890 College Football All-America Team. In December 1890, the members of the Princeton team elected Riggs as the captain of the 1891 football team. However, Riggs resigned the position before the 1891 season started. Riggs had become embroiled in a controversy over the increasing level of violence in football. The 1890 Princeton–Yale game was marked by instances of players throwing punches and fighting. Yale's captain Church showed deep scratches on his face and accused Riggs of striking his fingernails into Church's face and saying, "Now I have you. I'll just do you." Another Yale player said, "The most striking part to my mind was the disgraceful language used by Riggs, and also the dirty work he indulged in." Nonetheless, Riggs' ruthless behavior led Princeton to an impressive record that season. Riggs was married in October 1893 to Charlotte M. Symington (c.1870–1938).

Riggs' younger brother, Dudley Riggs followed him to Princeton, where he, too, became an All-American football player. In September 1893, a newspaper account compared Dudley to Jesse: "Another new man that gives much promise is a brother of the great Jesse Riggs, '92. This one's name is Dudley and he weighs 185 pounds—not bad to begin with. It is said he is another Jesse, built like him, a football fighter of his spirit and just as tricky as the big guard ..."

In 1965, Riggs was nominated for the College Football Hall of Fame, but did not receive a sufficient percentage of the vote for induction.
