= 1888 college football season =

American college football season

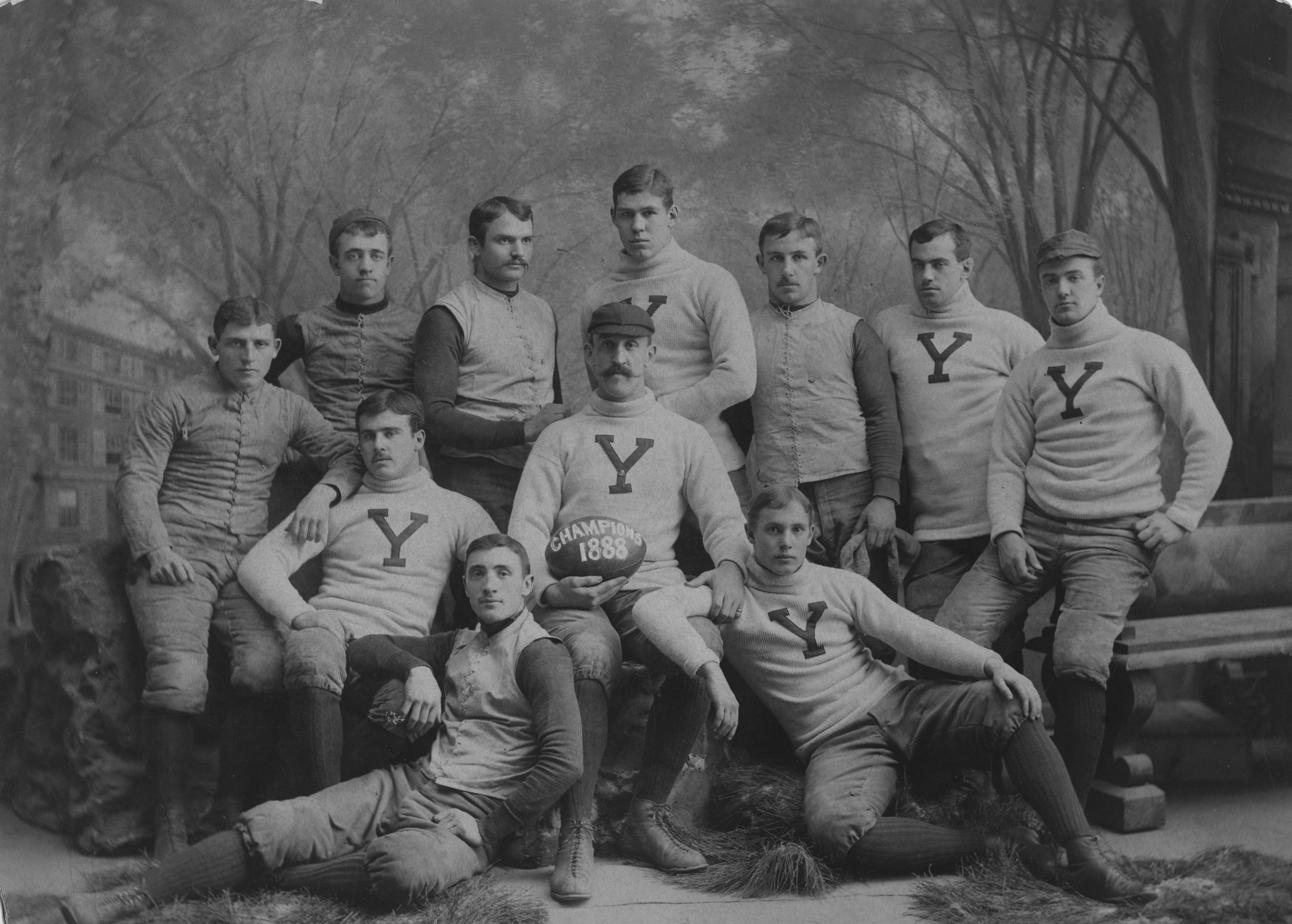
- 1888 Yale Bulldogs
- Total No. of teams: 18
- Regular season: September 29 to December 1
- Champion: Yale

The 1888 college football season had no clear-cut champion, with the Official NCAA Division I Football Records Book listing Yale as having been selected national champions. October 18 saw the first intercollegiate game in the state of North Carolina when Wake Forest defeated North Carolina 6–4. The first "scientific game" occurred on Thanksgiving of the same year when North Carolina played Duke (then Trinity). Duke won 16 to 0.

== Conference and program changes ==
School	1887 Conference	1888 Conference
USC Methodists	Program established	Independent

== Statistical leaders ==
- Player scoring most points: Knowlton Ames, Princeton, 243

== Conference standings ==
The following is a potentially incomplete list of conference standings:

1888 Eastern Intercollegiate Football Association standings
	Conf.					Overall
Team	W		L		T	W		L		T
Williams	3	–	1	–	0	4	–	4	–	0
Dartmouth	3	–	1	–	0	3	–	4	–	0
MIT	2	–	2	–	0	2	–	5	–	0
Stevens	1	–	2	–	0	2	–	7	–	1
Amherst	0	–	3	–	0	2	–	8	–	1

=== Independents ===
1888 Eastern college football independents records
	Conf.			Overall
Team	W	L	T	W		L		T
Yale		–		13	–	0	–	0
Harvard		–		12	–	1	–	0
Princeton		–		11	–	1	–	0
Lehigh		–		10	–	2	–	0
Trinity (CT)		–		5	–	1	–	1
Lafayette		–		6	–	3	–	0
Cornell		–		4	–	2	–	0
Penn		–		9	–	7	–	0
Bucknell		–		2	–	3	–	0
Fordham		–		1	–	2	–	0
Massachusetts		–		2	–	4	–	0
Wesleyan		–		2	–	7	–	0
Worcester Tech		–		1	–	4	–	0
Rutgers		–		1	–	6	–	1
Penn State		–		0	–	2	–	1
Swarthmore		–		0	–	5	–	0

1888 Midwestern college football independents records
	Conf.			Overall
Team	W	L	T	W		L		T
Cincinnati		–		1	–	0	–	1
Notre Dame		–		1	–	0	–	0
Washington University		–		1	–	0	–	0
Michigan		–		2	–	1	–	0
Northwestern		–		2	–	1	–	0
Lake Forest		–		2	–	2	–	0
Minnesota		–		1	–	1	–	0
Indiana		–		0	–	0	–	1
Miami (OH)		–		0	–	0	–	1
Albion		–		0	–	2	–	0

1888 Southern college football independents records
	Conf.			Overall
Team	W	L	T	W		L		T
Georgetown		–		4	–	2	–	0
Trinity (NC)		–		2	–	1	–	0
Virginia		–		2	–	1	–	0
Wake Forest		–		2	–	1	–	0
Johns Hopkins		–		6	–	5	–	0
Richmond		–		1	–	2	–	0
North Carolina		–		1	–	3	–	0
Navy		–		1	–	4	–	0
Gallaudet		–				–
Randolph–Macon		–				–
St. John's (MD)		–				–

1888 Western college football independents records
	Conf.			Overall
Team	W	L	T	W		L		T
USC		–		2	–	0	–	0
California		–		6	–	1	–	0
