= William Herbert Corbin =

American football player (1864–1945)

Pa Corbin
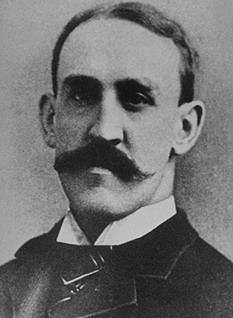

Profile
- Position: Center

Personal information
- Born: July 20, 1864; Union, Connecticut, U.S.
- Died: April 14, 1945 (aged 80); Hartford, Connecticut, U.S.
- Listed height: 6 ft 2 in (1.88 m)
- Listed weight: 185 lb (84 kg)

Career information
- College: Yale (1886–1888)
- College Football Hall of Fame

William Herbert "Pa" Corbin (July 20, 1864 – April 14, 1945) was an American college football player for the Yale Bulldogs football team for Yale University from 1886 to 1888, during which time the team posted a 31–0–1 record. He was elected to the College Football Hall of Fame in 1969.

== Early life ==
Corbin was born in Union, Connecticut, the son of William Melvin Corbin, a manufacturer and merchant who served in the Connecticut General Assembly, for one session as a representative and then as a state senator, and his wife, née Josephine Walker. He attended Hartford Public High School.

=== Yale ===
Corbin matriculated at Yale College, where he was on the freshman, sophomore, and university crews, and was captain of the freshman football team, and was on the university football team three years, and in his senior year as captain. Other activities included college hour, and financial manager of the Yale Daily News. He was a member of Psi Upsilon and Skull and Bones.

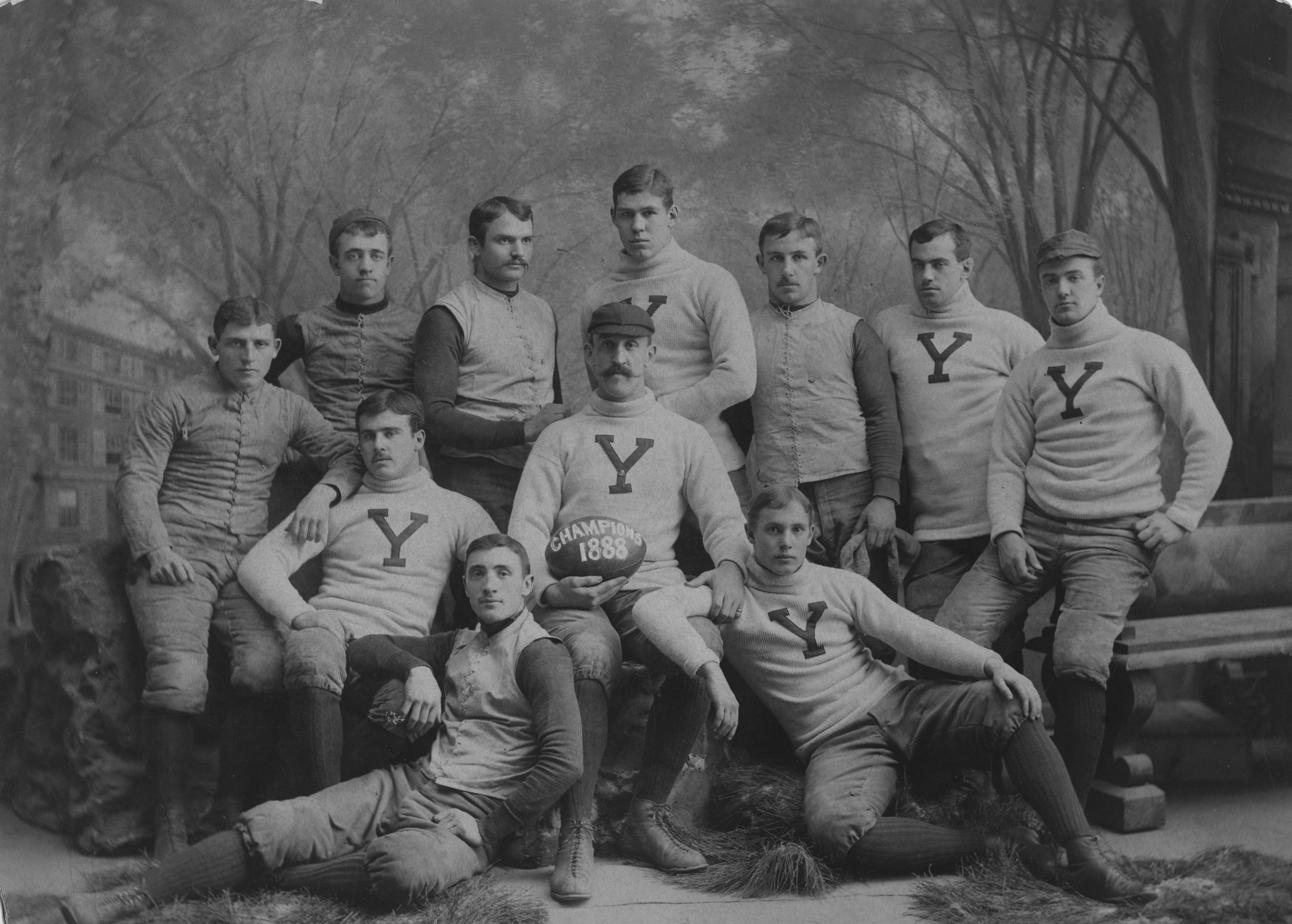
Corbin (holding ball) on Yale's 1888 team.

The 1888 Yale Football team, of which he was captain, was undefeated, winning thirteen games and tallying 698 points while holding their opponents scoreless. His interest in Yale football continued after graduation at practice session and games at the Yale Bowl; he became known to undergraduates as "Pa" Corbin. Former teammate Pudge Heffelfinger explained "Pa Corbin's long face and handlebar mustache gave him a majestic air, and made him look much older than his 24 years."

Corbin described how a center used to snap the ball with his foot: "By standing the ball on end and exercising a certain pressure on the same, it was possible to have it bound into the quarterback's hands."

== Teaching career ==
He taught at Westminster School at Dobbs Ferry for three years following graduation, and then became headmaster of the Pingry School from 1892 to 1897.

== Tax commissioner ==
He served as Connecticut State Tax Commissioner from 1907 until his retirement in 1920.

== Death ==
Corbin died in 1945 a month after he was struck by an automobile in Hartford, Connecticut.
