= Swarthmore Garnet Tide football =

Football program that represented Swarthmore College

- First season: 1878; 148 years ago
- Last season: 2000; 26 years ago
- Location: Swarthmore, Pennsylvania
- Stadium: Clothier Field Stadium (capacity: 2,000)
- NCAA division: Division III
- Conference: Centennial Conference
- Colors: Garnet and Gray
- All-time record: 467–442–37 (.513)

Conference championships
- Centennial Conference: 1983, 1984

Division championships
- MAC Southern Division: 1965, 1966, 1982
- Rivalries: Haverford; Franklin & Marshall
- Fight song: "Hip, Hip, Hip for Old Swarthmore"
- Website: Official website

The Swarthmore Garnet Tide represented Swarthmore College in the sport of college football. Historically known as the Quakers, Swarthmore was the 15th school to play college football.

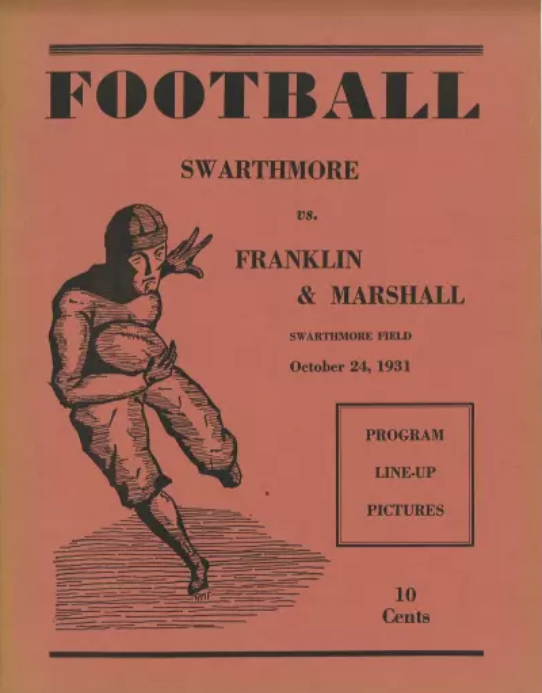
Swarthmore v. Franklin & Marshall (1931)

The football team was controversially eliminated in 2000, along with wrestling and, initially, badminton. The Board of Managers cited lack of athletes on campus and difficulty of recruiting as reasons for terminating the programs.

== Revival ==
On April 1, 2022, Swarthmore's student newspaper The Swarthmore Phoenix ran an April Fools' Day article about the return of Swarthmore football.

In 2024, The Swarthmore Phoenix ran another article on the return of football to campus. Arguing against the return of college football, student journalist Nathaniel Brown questioned "should Swarthmore have ever had a football team?"

=== 2025 Reunion ===
In 2025, Swarthmore alumni formed the Football Reunion Committee to preserve Swarthmore football's legacy on campus. For Garnet Week 2025, Swarthmore's homecoming, the college hosted over 100 alumni from Swarthmore Garnet Tide football. The players marched in a parade in their former stadium, Clothier Field Stadium, during halftime of a Swarthmore men's soccer game. Led by Athletic Director Brad Koch and President Valerie Smith, the former players held a panel and commemorated the "continuing story of Swarthmore football."
