= List of Wake Forest Demon Deacons football seasons =

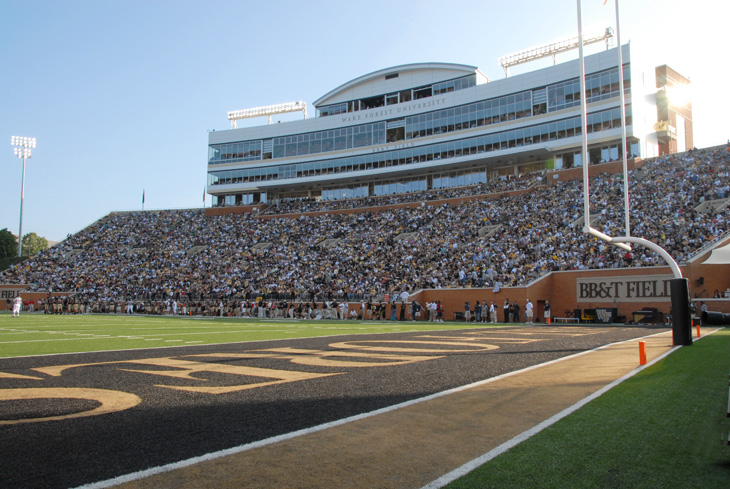
With a capacity of 31,500, Truist Field has been the home of Wake Forest football since 1968.

This is a list of seasons completed by the Wake Forest Demon Deacons football team. Representing Wake Forest University in Winston-Salem, North Carolina, the Demon Deacons are members of the Atlantic Coast Conference in the NCAA Division I FBS. They play their home games out of Truist Field, and are currently led by head coach Jake Dickert.

The Demon Deacons began playing football in 1888, competing as an independent for several decades until joining the Southern Conference in 1936. After 17 years in the SoCon, the Deacons joined the ACC as a charter member in 1953, and have competed in the league ever since. Wake Forest won their first ACC championship in 1970, and captured their first Atlantic Division title in 2006, culminating with a victory over Georgia Tech in the 2006 ACC Championship Game. The Demon Deacons have competed in 16 bowl games as of 2021, having won ten, and have currently made a bowl game in six consecutive seasons, which is the longest streak in program history. Wake Forest has finished the season ranked in the AP Poll on five occasions, most recently in the 2021 campaign which was one of the most successful seasons in school history, as Wake posted an 11–3 mark and was the ACC runner-up.

== Seasons ==
Legend

† National Champions
^{†} Conference champions
^{‡} Division champions
^Bowl game berth/Playoff Result

List of Wake Forest Demon Deacons football seasons
Season	Team	Head coach	Conference	Division	Regular season results							Postseason results	Final ranking	
Season	Team	Head coach	Conference	Division	Overall			Conference				Bowl game/Playoff result	AP Poll	Coaches' Poll
Season	Team	Head coach	Conference	Division	Win	Loss	Tie	Win	Loss	Tie	Finish	Bowl game/Playoff result	AP Poll	Coaches' Poll
Wake Forest Demon Deacons
1888	1888	W. C. Dowd	Independent	—	1	0	0				—	—	—	—
1889	1889	W. C. Riddick	Independent	—	3	3	0				—	—	—	—
1890	1890	No team	Independent	—	No team									
1891	1891	E. Walter Sikes	Independent	—	1	0	0				—	—	—	—
1892	1892	E. Walter Sikes	Independent	—	4	0	1				—	—	—	—
1893	1893	E. Walter Sikes	Independent	—	1	2	0				—	—	—	—
1894	1894	No team	Independent	—	No team									
1895	1895	Unknown	Independent	—	0	0	1				—	—	—	—
1908	1908	A. P. Hall Jr.	Independent	—	1	4	0				—	—	—	—
1909	1909	A. T. Myers	Independent	—	2	4	0				—	—	—	—
1910	1910	Reddy Rowe	Independent	—	2	7	0				—	—	—	—
1911	1911	Frank Thompson	Independent	—	3	5	0				—	—	—	—
1912	1912	Frank Thompson	Independent	—	2	6	0				—	—	—	—
1913	1913	Frank Thompson	Independent	—	0	8	0				—	—	—	—
1914	1914	Wilbur C. Smith	Independent	—	3	6	0				—	—	—	—
1915	1915	Wilbur C. Smith	Independent	—	3	4	0				—	—	—	—
1916	1916	G. M. Billings	Independent	—	3	3	0				—	—	—	—
1917	1917	E. T. MacDonnell	Independent	—	1	6	1				—	—	—	—
1918	1918	Harry Rabenhorst	Independent	—	1	3	0				—	—	—	—
1919	1919	Harry Rabenhorst	Independent	—	2	6	0				—	—	—	—
1920	1920	James L. White	Independent	—	2	7	0				—	—	—	—
1921	1921	James L. White	Independent	—	2	8	0				—	—	—	—
1922	1922	George Levene	Independent	—	3	5	2				—	—	—	—
1923	1923	Hank Garrity	Independent	—	6	3	0				—	—	—	—
1924	1924	Hank Garrity	Independent	—	7	2	0				—	—	—	—
1925	1925	Hank Garrity	Independent	—	6	2	1				—	—	—	—
1926	1926	James A. Baldwin	Independent	—	5	4	1				—	—	—	—
1927	1927	James A. Baldwin	Independent	—	2	6	2				—	—	—	—
1928	1928	Stan Cofall	Independent	—	2	6	2				—	—	—	—
1929	1929	Pat Miller	Independent	—	6	5	1				—	—	—	—
1930	1930	Pat Miller	Independent	—	5	3	1				—	—	—	—
1931	1931	Pat Miller	Independent	—	4	4	0				—	—	—	—
1932	1932	Pat Miller	Independent	—	3	3	2				—	—	—	—
1933	1933	Jim Weaver	Independent	—	0	5	1				—	—	—	—
1934	1934	Jim Weaver	Independent	—	3	7	0				—	—	—	—
1935	1935	Jim Weaver	Independent	—	2	7	0				—	—	—	—
1936	1936	Jim Weaver	Southern	—	5	4	0	2	3	0	10th	—	—	—
1937	1937	D. C. Walker	Southern	—	3	6	0	1	4	0	T-13th	—	—	—
1938	1938	D. C. Walker	Southern	—	4	5	1	3	4	1	9th	—	—	—
1939	1939	D. C. Walker	Southern	—	7	3	0	3	3	0	T-7th	—	—	—
1940	1940	D. C. Walker	Southern	—	7	3	0	4	2	0	3rd	—	—	—
1941	1941	D. C. Walker	Southern	—	5	5	1	4	2	1	7th	—	—	—
1942	1942	D. C. Walker	Southern	—	6	2	1	6	1	1	3rd	—	—	—
1943	1943	D. C. Walker	Southern	—	4	5	0	3	2	0	4th	—	—	—
1944	1944	D. C. Walker	Southern	—	8	1	0	6	1	0	2nd	—	—	—
1945	1945	D. C. Walker	Southern	—	5	3	1	4	1	1	2nd	Won 1946 Gator Bowl against South Carolina, 26–14 ^	19	—
1946	1946	D. C. Walker	Southern	—	6	3	0	2	3	0	T-11th	—	—	—
1947	1947	D. C. Walker	Southern	—	6	4	0	3	4	0	10th	—	—	—
1948	1948	D. C. Walker	Southern	—	6	4	0	5	2	0	5th	Lost 1949 Dixie Bowl against Baylor, 7–20 ^	20	—
1949	1949	D. C. Walker	Southern	—	4	6	0	3	3	0	T-9th	—	—	—
1950	1950	D. C. Walker	Southern	—	6	1	2	6	1	1	4th	—	—	—
1951	1951	Tom Rogers	Southern	—	6	4	0	5	3	0	T-7th	—	—	—
1952	1952	Tom Rogers	Southern	—	5	4	1	5	1	0	T-2nd	—	—	—
1953	1953	Tom Rogers	ACC	—	3	6	1	2	3	0	T-3rd	—	—	—
1954	1954	Tom Rogers	ACC	—	2	7	1	1	4	1	6th	—	—	—
1955	1955	Tom Rogers	ACC	—	5	4	1	3	3	1	T-4th	—	—	—
1956	1956	Paul Amen	ACC	—	2	5	3	1	5	1	7th	—	—	—
1957	1957	Paul Amen	ACC	—	0	10	0	0	7	0	8th	—	—	—
1958	1958	Paul Amen	ACC	—	3	7	0	2	4	0	6th	—	—	—
1959	1959	Paul Amen	ACC	—	6	4	0	4	3	0	T-4th	—	—	—
1960	1960	Billy Hildebrand	ACC	—	2	8	0	2	5	0	T-6th	—	—	—
1961	1961	Billy Hildebrand	ACC	—	4	6	0	3	4	0	T-5th	—	—	—
1962	1962	Billy Hildebrand	ACC	—	0	10	0	0	7	0	8th	—	—	—
1963	1963	Billy Hildebrand	ACC	—	1	9	0	1	5	0	7th	—	—	—
1964	1964	Bill Tate	ACC	—	5	5	0	4	3	0	T-3rd	—	—	—
1965	1965	Bill Tate	ACC	—	3	7	0	1	5	0	8th	—	—	—
1966	1966	Bill Tate	ACC	—	3	7	0	2	4	0	6th	—	—	—
1967	1967	Bill Tate	ACC	—	4	6	0	3	4	0	5th	—	—	—
1968	1968	Bill Tate	ACC	—	2	7	1	2	3	1	6th	—	—	—
1969	1969	Cal Stoll	ACC	—	3	7	0	2	5	0	7th	—	—	—
1970	1970^{†}	Cal Stoll	ACC	—	6	5	0	5	1	0	1st^{†}	—	—	—
1971	1971	Cal Stoll	ACC	—	6	5	0	2	3	0	T-3rd	—	—	—
1972	1972	Tom Harper	ACC	—	2	9	0	1	5	0	T-6th	—	—	—
1973	1973	Chuck Mills	ACC	—	1	9	1	0	5	1	7th	—	—	—
1974	1974	Chuck Mills	ACC	—	1	10	0	0	6	0	7th	—	—	—
1975	1975	Chuck Mills	ACC	—	3	8	0	3	3	0	4th	—	—	—
1976	1976	Chuck Mills	ACC	—	5	6	0	3	3	0	3rd	—	—	—
1977	1977	Chuck Mills	ACC	—	1	10	0	0	6	0	7th	—	—	—
1978	1978	John Mackovic	ACC	—	1	10	0	1	5	0	6th	—	—	—
1979	1979	John Mackovic	ACC	—	8	4	0	4	2	0	T-2nd	Lost 1979 Tangerine Bowl against LSU, 10–34 ^	—	—
1980	1980	John Mackovic	ACC	—	5	6	0	2	4	0	T-4th	—	—	—
1981	1981	Al Groh	ACC	—	4	7	0	1	5	0	6th	—	—	—
1982	1982	Al Groh	ACC	—	3	8	0	0	6	0	7th	—	—	—
1983	1983	Al Groh	ACC	—	4	7	0	1	5	0	T-6th	—	—	—
1984	1984	Al Groh	ACC	—	6	5	0	3	3	0	4th	—	—	—
1985	1985	Al Groh	ACC	—	4	7	0	1	6	0	8th	—	—	—
1986	1986	Al Groh	ACC	—	5	6	0	2	5	0	8th	—	—	—
1987	1987	Bill Dooley	ACC	—	7	4	0	4	3	0	T-3rd	—	—	—
1988	1988	Bill Dooley	ACC	—	6	4	1	4	3	0	T-4th	—	—	—
1989	1989	Bill Dooley	ACC	—	2	8	1	1	6	0	7th	—	—	—
1990	1990	Bill Dooley	ACC	—	3	8	0	0	7	0	8th	—	—	—
1991	1991	Bill Dooley	ACC	—	3	8	0	1	6	0	T-7th	—	—	—
1992	1992	Bill Dooley	ACC	—	8	4	0	4	4	0	T-4th	Won 1992 Independence Bowl against Oregon, 39–35 ^	25	25
1993	1993	Jim Caldwell	ACC	—	2	9	0	1	7	0	9th	—	—	—
1994	1994	Jim Caldwell	ACC	—	3	8	0	1	7	0	8th	—	—	—
1995	1995	Jim Caldwell	ACC	—	1	10	0	0	8	0	9th	—	—	—
1996 (Note: Overtime rules were added to college football in 1996, thereby eliminating ties.)	1996	Jim Caldwell	ACC	—	3	8		1	7		8th	—	—	—
1997	1997	Jim Caldwell	ACC	—	5	6		3	5		7th	—	—	—
1998	1998	Jim Caldwell	ACC	—	3	8		2	6		7th	—	—	—
1999	1999	Jim Caldwell	ACC	—	7	5		3	5		T-5th	Won 1999 Aloha Bowl against Arizona State, 23–3 ^	—	—
2000	2000	Jim Caldwell	ACC	—	2	9		1	7		8th	—	—	—
2001	2001	Jim Grobe	ACC	—	6	5		3	5		7th	—	—	—
2002	2002	Jim Grobe	ACC	—	7	6		3	5		7th	Won 2002 Seattle Bowl against Oregon, 38–17 ^	—	—
2003	2003	Jim Grobe	ACC	—	5	7		3	5		7th	—	—	—
2004	2004	Jim Grobe	ACC	—	4	7		1	7		T-10th	—	—	—
2005	2005	Jim Grobe	ACC	Atlantic	4	7		3	5		T-4th	—	—	—
2006	2006^{‡}	Jim Grobe	ACC	Atlantic	11	3		6	2		1st^{‡}	Lost 2007 Orange Bowl against Louisville, 13–24 ^	18	17
2007	2007	Jim Grobe	ACC	Atlantic	9	4		5	3		T-2nd	Won 2007 Meineke Car Care Bowl against Connecticut, 24–10 ^	—	—
2008	2008	Jim Grobe	ACC	Atlantic	8	5		4	4		T-3rd	Won 2008 EagleBank Bowl against Navy, 29–19 ^	—	—
2009	2009	Jim Grobe	ACC	Atlantic	5	7		3	5		4th	—	—	—
2010	2010	Jim Grobe	ACC	Atlantic	3	9		1	7		6th	—	—	—
2011	2011	Jim Grobe	ACC	Atlantic	6	7		5	3		T-2nd	Lost 2011 Music City Bowl against Mississippi State, 17–23 ^	—	—
2012	2012	Jim Grobe	ACC	Atlantic	5	7		3	5		4th	—	—	—
2013	2013	Jim Grobe	ACC	Atlantic	4	8		2	6		6th	—	—	—
2014	2014	Dave Clawson	ACC	Atlantic	3	9		1	7		T-6th	—	—	—
2015	2015	Dave Clawson	ACC	Atlantic	3	9		1	7		6th	—	—	—
2016	2016	Dave Clawson	ACC	Atlantic	7	6		3	5		T–4th	Won 2016 Military Bowl against Temple, 34–26 ^	—	—
2017	2017	Dave Clawson	ACC	Atlantic	8	5		4	4		T-3rd	Won 2017 Belk Bowl against Texas A&M, 55–52 ^	—	—
2018	2018	Dave Clawson	ACC	Atlantic	7	6		3	5		T-5th	Won 2018 Birmingham Bowl against Memphis, 37–34 ^	—	—
2019	2019	Dave Clawson	ACC	Atlantic	8	5		4	4		T-3rd	Lost 2019 Pinstripe Bowl against Michigan State, 21–27 ^	—	—
2020	2020	Dave Clawson	ACC	Atlantic	4	5		3	4		10th	Lost 2020 Duke's Mayo Bowl against Wisconsin, 28-42 ^	—	—
2021	2021^{‡}	Dave Clawson	ACC	Atlantic	11	3		7	1		1st^{‡}	Won 2021 Gator Bowl against Rutgers, 38-10 ^	15	14
2022	2022	Dave Clawson	ACC	Atlantic	8	5		3	5		6th	Won 2022 Gasparilla Bowl against Missouri, 27–17 ^	—	—
2023	2023	Dave Clawson	ACC	–	4	8		1	7		14th	—	—	—
2024	2024	Dave Clawson	ACC	–	4	8		2	6		T–14th	—	—	—
2025	2025	Jake Dickert	ACC	–	9	4		4	4		T–7th	Won 2026 Duke's Mayo Bowl against Mississippi State, 43–29 ^	—	—
2026	2026				8	1		5	1		-	—	—	—
Totals					All-time: 513–699–33 (.425)			Conference: 232–383–10 (.379)			—	Postseason: 12–6 (.667)	—	—
