= List of Wake Forest Demon Deacons head football coaches =

The Wake Forest Demon Deacons college football team represents Wake Forest University in the Atlantic Coast Conference (ACC). The Demon Deacons compete as part of the NCAA Division I Football Bowl Subdivision. The program has had 33 head coaches since it began play during the 1888 season. Since December 2024, Jake Dickert has served as head coach at Wake Forest.

Seven coaches have led Wake Forest in postseason bowl games: Peahead Walker, John Mackovic, Bill Dooley, Jim Caldwell, Jim Grobe, Dave Clawson, and Dickert. Two of those coaches also won conference championships: Cal Stoll and Grobe each captured one as a member of the Atlantic Coast Conference.

Peahead Walker is the leader in games won and seasons coached with 77 wins in his 14 years as head coach each. Hank Garrity has the highest winning percentage at 0.722. Bill Hildebrand has the lowest winning percentage of those who have coached more than one game, with 0.175.

== Key ==
Key to symbols in coaches list
General		Overall		Conference		Postseason (Note: Although the first Rose Bowl Game was played in 1902, it has been continuously played since the 1916 game, and is recognized as the oldest bowl game by the NCAA. "—" indicates any season prior to 1916 when postseason games were not played.)	
No.	Order of coaches (Note: A running total of the number of head coaches, with coaches who served separate tenures being counted only once. Interim head coaches are represented with "Int" and are not counted in the running total. "—" indicates the team played but either without a coach or no coach is on record. "X" indicates an interim year without play.)	GC	Games coached	CW	Conference wins	PW	Postseason wins
DC	Division championships	OW	Overall wins	CL	Conference losses	PL	Postseason losses
CC	Conference championships	OL	Overall losses	CT	Conference ties	PT	Postseason ties
NC	National championships	OT	Overall ties (Note: Overtime rules in college football were introduced in 1996, making ties impossible in the period since.)	C%	Conference winning percentage		
†	Elected to the College Football Hall of Fame	O%	Overall winning percentage (Note: When computing the win–loss percentage, a tie counts as half a win and half a loss.)				

== Coaches ==
List of head football coaches showing season(s) coached, overall records, conference records, postseason records, championships and selected awards (Note: Statistics correct as of the end of the 2025 NCAA Division I FBS football season.)
No.	Name (Note: Wake Forest did not have a head coach for the 1895 season.)	Season(s) (Note: Wake Forest did not field teams for the 1890, 1894, or 1896–1907 seasons.)	GC	OW	OL	OT	O%	CW	CL	CT	C%	PW	PL	PT	CC	NC	Awards
1	W. C. Dowd	1888	1	1	0	0	1.000	—	—	—	—	—	—	—	—	—	—
2	W. C. Riddick	1888–1889	6	3	3	0	0.500	—	—	—	—	—	—	—	—	—	—
3	E. Walter Sikes	1891–1893	9	6	2	1	0.722	—	—	—	—	—	—	—	—	—	—
4	A. P. Hall Jr.	1908	5	1	4	0	0.200	—	—	—	—	—	—	—	—	—	—
5	A. T. Myers	1909	6	2	4	0	0.333	—	—	—	—	—	—	—	—	—	—
6	Reddy Rowe	1910	9	2	7	0	0.222	—	—	—	—	—	—	—	—	—	—
7	Frank Thompson	1911–1913	24	5	19	0	0.208	—	—	—	—	—	—	—	—	—	—
8	Wilbur C. Smith	1914–1915	16	6	10	0	0.375	—	—	—	—	—	—	—	—	—	—
9	G. M. Billings	1916	6	3	3	0	0.500	—	—	—	—	—	—	—	—	—	—
10	E. T. MacDonnell	1917	8	1	6	1	0.188	—	—	—	—	—	—	—	—	—	—
11	Harry Rabenhorst	1918–1919	11	3	8	0	0.273	—	—	—	—	—	—	—	—	—	—
12	James L. White	1920–1921	19	4	15	0	0.211	—	—	—	—	—	—	—	—	—	—
13	George Levene	1922	10	3	5	2	0.400	—	—	—	—	—	—	—	—	—	—
14	Hank Garrity	1923–1925	27	19	7	1	0.722	—	—	—	—	—	—	—	—	—	—
15	James A. Baldwin	1926–1927	20	7	10	3	0.425	—	—	—	—	—	—	—	—	—	—
16	Stan Cofall	1928	10	2	6	2	0.300	—	—	—	—	—	—	—	—	—	—
17	Pat Miller	1929–1932	37	18	15	4	0.541	—	—	—	—	—	—	—	—	—	—
18	Jim Weaver	1933–1936	33	10	23	1	0.309	2	3	0	0.400	—	—	—	0	—	—
19	Peahead Walker	1937–1950	134	77	51	6	0.597	53	33	5	0.610	1	1	0	0	—	—
20	Tom Rogers	1951–1955	50	21	25	4	0.460	16	14	2	0.531	0	0	0	0	—	—
21	Paul Amen	1956–1959	40	11	26	3	0.313	7	19	1	0.278	0	0	0	0	—	—
22	Bill Hildebrand	1960–1963	40	7	33	0	0.175	6	21	0	0.222	0	0	0	0	—	—
23	Bill Tate	1964–1968	50	17	32	1	0.350	13	18	1	0.422	0	0	0	0	—	—
24	Cal Stoll	1969–1971	32	15	17	0	0.469	9	9	0	0.500	0	0	0	1	—	—
25	Tom Harper	1972	11	2	9	0	0.182	1	5	0	0.167	0	0	0	0	—	—
26	Chuck Mills	1973–1977	55	11	43	1	0.209	6	23	1	0.217	0	0	0	0	—	—
27	John Mackovic	1978–1980	34	14	20	0	0.412	6	11	0	0.353	0	1	0	0	—	—
28	Al Groh	1981–1986	66	26	40	0	0.394	8	32	0	0.200	0	0	0	0	—	—
29	Bill Dooley	1987–1992	67	29	36	2	0.448	14	29	0	0.326	1	0	0	0	—	—
30	Jim Caldwell	1993–2000	89	26	63	0	0.292	12	52	0	0.188	1	0	0	0	—	—
31	Jim Grobe	2001–2013	159	77	82	—	0.484	42	62	—	0.404	3	2	—	1	—	AP College Football COY (2006); Bobby Dodd COY (2006); Sporting News COY (2006)
32	Dave Clawson	2014–2024	136	67	69	—	0.493	32	55	—	0.368	5	2	—	0	—	—
33	Jake Dickert	2025–present	13	9	4	—	0.692	4	4	—	0.500	1	0	—	0	—	—
