= 1888 Trinity Blue and White football team =

American college football season

1888 Trinity Blue and White football
- Conference: Independent
- Record: 2–1
- Head coach: John Franklin Crowell (1st season)

1888 Southern college football independents records
| | Conf. | | | Overall |
| Team | W | L | T | W | | L | | T |
|---|---|---|---|---|---|---|---|---|
| Georgetown | | – | | 4 | – | 2 | – | 0 |
| Trinity (NC) | | – | | 2 | – | 1 | – | 0 |
| Virginia | | – | | 2 | – | 1 | – | 0 |
| Wake Forest | | – | | 2 | – | 1 | – | 0 |
| Johns Hopkins | | – | | 6 | – | 5 | – | 0 |
| Richmond | | – | | 1 | – | 2 | – | 0 |
| North Carolina | | – | | 1 | – | 3 | – | 0 |
| Navy | | – | | 1 | – | 4 | – | 0 |
| Gallaudet | | – | | | | – |
| Randolph–Macon | | – | | | | – |
| St. John's (MD) | | – | | | | – |

The 1888 Trinity Blue and White football team represented Trinity College (today known as Duke University) in the 1888 college football season. The game against North Carolina was the first "scientific" game in the state.

== Schedule ==
| Date | Time | Opponent | Site | Result | Source |
|---|---|---|---|---|---|
| November 29 | | vs. North Carolina | Base Ball Park; Raleigh, NC (rivalry) | W 16–0 | |
| March 8, 1889 | | vs. North Carolina | Athletic Grounds; Raleigh, NC | W 25–17 | |
| March 29, 1889 | 3:30 p.m. | vs. Wake Forest | Athletic Grounds; Raleigh, NC | L 0–32 | |
