= 1888 Navy Midshipmen football team =

American college football season

1888 Navy Midshipmen football
- Conference: Independent
- Record: 1–4
- Head coach: None
- Captain: George Fermier

1888 Southern college football independents records
	Conf.			Overall
Team	W	L	T	W		L		T
Georgetown		–		4	–	2	–	0
Trinity (NC)		–		2	–	1	–	0
Virginia		–		2	–	1	–	0
Wake Forest		–		2	–	1	–	0
Johns Hopkins		–		6	–	5	–	0
Richmond		–		1	–	2	–	0
North Carolina		–		1	–	3	–	0
Navy		–		1	–	4	–	0
Gallaudet		–				–
Randolph–Macon		–				–
St. John's (MD)		–				–

The 1888 Navy Midshipmen football team represented the United States Naval Academy during the 1888 college football season. The team compiled a 1–4 record and were outscored by its opponents 73 to 35. In the eighth installment of the Johns Hopkins–Navy football rivalry, Navy lost by a 25 to 12 score. In the final game of the 1888 season, the Midshipmen lost to St. John's College by a 22–6 score, with a brawl breaking out at the end of the game. The team captain was George Hayward.

== Schedule ==
Date	Opponent	Site	Result	Source
October 20	St. John's (MD)	Annapolis, MD	L 4–6	
November 3	Gallaudet	Annapolis, MD	W 4–0	
November 29	Johns Hopkins	Annapolis, MD (rivalry)	L 12–25	
December 1	Penn	Annapolis, MD	L 9–20	
December 9	St. John's (MD)	Annapolis, MD	L 6–22	
