= 1933 All-Southern Conference football team =

The 1933 All-Southern Conference football team consists of American football players chosen by the Associated Press (AP) and United Press (UP) for the All-Southern Conference football team for the 1933 college football season.

== All-Southern Conference selections ==
=== Quarterbacks ===
- Horace Hendrickson, Duke (AP-1)
- Billy Smith, VMI (AP-2)
- Hal Mauney, South Carolina (AP-3)

=== Halfbacks ===
- Earl Clary, South Carolina (AP-1)
- Alfred Casey, Virginia Tech (AP-1)
- B. O. Cornelius, Duke (AP-2)
- Joe Sawyers, Washington & Lee (AP-2)
- Earl Widmyer, Maryland (AP-3)
- Tommy Johnson, Virginia (AP-3)

=== Fullbacks ===
- Bob Cox, Duke (AP-1)
- Ray Rex, North Carolina State (AP-2)
- Jack Bailey, Washington & Lee (AP-3)

=== Ends ===
- Tom Rogers, Duke (AP-1)
- Warren Hengri, Virginia Tech (AP-1)
- John Hanley, Washington & Lee (AP-2)
- Earle Wentz, Duke (AP-2)
- Tom Craig, South Carolina (AP-3)
- Raymond Redding, North Carolina State (AP-3)

=== Tackles ===
- Fred Crawford, Duke (AP-1)
- Ray Burger, Virginia (AP-1)
- Freeman Huskey, South Carolina (AP-2)
- Jim Tatum, North Carolina (AP-2)
- Gus Durner, Duke (AP-3)
- George Coles, Virginia (AP-3)

=== Guards ===
- Amos Bolen, Washington & Lee (AP-1)
- George T. Barclay, North Carolina (AP-1)
- Johnny Dial, Virginia (AP-2)
- Carl Shock, Duke (AP-2)
- Charlie Straub, VMI (AP-2)
- Buddy Moorhead, South Carolina (AP-3)
- John Heinemann, Clemson (AP-3)

=== Centers ===
- Eugene Wagner, Virginia (AP-1)
- Bill Porterfield, Virginia Tech (AP-2)
- Jack Dunlap, Duke (AP-3)
- Joe Shinn, South Carolina (AP-3)

== Key ==
AP = Associated Press

UP = United Press

== See also ==
- 1933 College Football All-America Team
