= 1888 Virginia Orange and Blue football team =

American college football season

1888 Virginia Orange and Blue football
- Conference: Independent
- Record: 2–1
- Head coach: None
- Captain: Francklyn A. Meacham
- Home stadium: Madison Hall Field

1888 Southern college football independents records
	Conf.			Overall
Team	W	L	T	W		L		T
Georgetown		–		4	–	2	–	0
Trinity (NC)		–		2	–	1	–	0
Virginia		–		2	–	1	–	0
Wake Forest		–		2	–	1	–	0
Johns Hopkins		–		6	–	5	–	0
Richmond		–		1	–	2	–	0
North Carolina		–		1	–	3	–	0
Navy		–		1	–	4	–	0
Gallaudet		–				–
Randolph–Macon		–				–
St. John's (MD)		–				–

The 1888 Virginia Orange and Blue football team represented the University of Virginia as an independent during the 1888 college football season.

== Schedule ==
Date	Opponent	Site	Result	Source
November 20	Pantops Academy	Madison Hall Field; Charlottesville, VA	W 20–0	
November 24	at Episcopal High School	Alexandria, VA	W 16–0	
December 8	Johns Hopkins	Madison Hall Field; Charlottesville, VA	L 0–26	
