= Fred Crawford (American football) =

American football player (1910–1974)

No. 32 – Duke Blue Devils
- Position: Tackle / End

Personal information
- Born: July 27, 1910; Waynesville, North Carolina, U.S.
- Died: March 5, 1974 (aged 63); Tallahassee, Florida, U.S.
- Listed height: 6 ft 2 in (1.88 m)
- Listed weight: 190 lb (86 kg)

Career information
- High school: Waynesville Township (NC), The McCallie School (TN)
- College: Duke (1932–1933)

Career history
- 1935: Chicago Bears

Awards and highlights
- Championships: 1 SoCon (1933); Honors: Consensus All-American (1933); Second-team All-American (1932); 2× First-team All-SoCon (1932, 1933)
- College Football Hall of Fame (Class of 1973)

Frederick Eugene Crawford (July 27, 1910 – March 5, 1974) was an American professional football player for the Chicago Bears of the National Football League (NFL). He played college football for the Duke Blue Devils, and later played one season for the Bears in 1935. He was inducted to the College Football Hall of Fame in 1973.

== Biography ==
Crawford was born in 1910 in Waynesville, North Carolina, the son of congressman William T. Crawford. He attended both Waynesville Township high school and The McCallie School in Chattanooga, Tennessee.

=== College football ===
Crawford played at tackle and end for Wallace Wade's Duke Blue Devils, selected All-Southern in 1932 and a consensus All-American in 1933. Crawford was the first football player to gain first-team All-America honors from the state of North Carolina. He was mainly responsible in 1933 for the defeat of the Tennessee Volunteers, that team's first loss in over two and a half seasons. It caused Tennessee coach Bob Neyland to remark: "He gave the finest exhibition of tackle play I have ever seen." Duke won the Southern Conference the same year, winning nine straight games until a loss at Georgia Tech knocked Duke out of contention for the Rose Bowl.

One description of Crawford's play said he was "a hell-for-leather, hard-hitting, hard-charging, fast-running juggernaut" who "covered punts like a run-away express'" and "charged through the line like a lion going in for the kill. Coach Wallace Wade called Crawford "the greatest lineman I ever saw."

=== Professional football ===
After a brief motion picture career, including an appearance in 1934's Bright Eyes starring Shirley Temple, Crawford played in the National Football League (NFL) for the Chicago Bears. He played just a year due to a lack of size for an interior line position and a broken leg. George Halas discovered Crawford could throw quite far indeed, and in a preseason game let him throw what was a completion to Ed Kawal that went 82 yards in the air.

=== Later life ===
Crawford served in the United States Air Force during World War II. After the war and until the time of his death, he was an official with the Florida State Motor Vehicle Department. Crawford was elected to the North Carolina Sports Hall of Fame in 1964, the College Football Hall of Fame in 1973, and the Duke Sports Hall of Fame in 1976. He died in 1974, aged 63.
