= 1888 North Carolina Tar Heels football team =

American college football season

1888 North Carolina Tar Heels football
- Conference: Independent; North Carolina Inter-Collegiate Football Association (spring 1889)
- Record: 1–3 (1–1 NCIFA)
- Head coach: Hector Cowan (spring 1889) (1st season)
- Captains: Bob Bingham; Steve Bragaw
- Home stadium: Campus Athletic Field (I)

1888 Southern college football independents records
	Conf.			Overall
Team	W	L	T	W		L		T
Georgetown		–		4	–	2	–	0
Trinity (NC)		–		2	–	1	–	0
Virginia		–		2	–	1	–	0
Wake Forest		–		2	–	1	–	0
Johns Hopkins		–		6	–	5	–	0
Richmond		–		1	–	2	–	0
North Carolina		–		1	–	3	–	0
Navy		–		1	–	4	–	0
Gallaudet		–				–
Randolph–Macon		–				–
St. John's (MD)		–				–

The 1888 North Carolina Tar Heels football team represented the University of North Carolina (referred to as "the University" or "Chapel Hill" in media at the time) that was in the 1888 college football season. (Note: The school was referred to as "The University" or "Chapel Hill" in various contemporary newspapers and magazines at the time.) The Tar Heels played four games, two in the fall of 1888 and two in March 1889, with a final record of 1–3. This was the first season the university fielded a football team. The team captains for the 1888 season were Bob Bingham and Steve Bragaw. The game against Wake Forest on October 18, 1888 was the first in the state, and the game against Trinity several weeks later, on November 29, was the first "scientific" game in the state. Princeton star Hector Cowan traveled south at the beginning of 1889, and trained the team for ten days, prior to the team's games in March, and was paid $300, which was collected by the student body for that purpose.

== The Schedule ==
Date	Time	Opponent	Site	Result	Attendance
October 18	3:00 p.m.	vs. Wake Forest	State Fairgrounds (II); Raleigh, NC (rivalry)	L 4–6	
November 29	3:00 p.m.	vs. Trinity (NC)	Base Ball Park; Raleigh, NC (rivalry)	L 0–16	600
March 1, 1889	4:00 p.m.	vs. Wake Forest	Athletic Park; Raleigh, NC	W 33–0	500
March 8, 1889	2:45 p.m.	vs. Trinity (NC)	Athletic Park; Raleigh, NC	L 17–25	700

== Football at the University ==
American football started spreading to North Carolina college campuses in the 1880s. In late 1883, a team of seniors and freshman squared off against a team composed of sophomores and juniors and won. In 1886, The University Magazine wrote that "football now reigns supreme as the king of winter sports" on UNC's campus. In the yearly game between the Seniors and Freshman against the Sophomores and Juniors on October 30, 1886, the Seniors and Freshman easily beat the opposing side.

In 1887 fall, students began practicing football well in advance of the inter-class game that was held on October 7, 1887, in which the Seniors and Freshman beat the Sophomores and Juniors. The school's football team had scheduled a game with the Binghamites on Thanksgiving 1887, but that was cancelled due to an "unavoidable cause." Instead, the Dialectic and Philanthropic Societies played three games, with the Phis besting the Dis in the series 2–1. In 1888, The University Magazine wrote that the sophomore class team was "getting ready to challenge anything that walks – their usual attitude." The magazine further mentioned a tournament that would take place between six fraternities following the North Carolina State Fair.

== Season summary ==
Decidedly one of the most interesting features of the whole fair was the game of foot ball yesterday between Wake Forest and Chapel Hill, resulting in a victory for Wake Forest. The game was exciting and was played by excellent teams on both sides. It was witnessed by a tremendous crowd. The players were uniformed and were a skilled and active set of boys.

— The News and Observer reflecting on the October 18th Wake Forest-North Carolina game

The first ever inter-collegiate football game in North Carolina and the first ever game for the university football team came against Wake Forest at the North Carolina State Fair on October 18 at 3:00 p.m local time. Each team had 15 members and the field was 300 feet long by 100 feet wide and took place in front of the fair's grand stand. Wake Forest brought a team representing their whole school, while the North Carolina's team was composed of only their sophomore class. The game utilized "a set of improvised rules" per for The University Magazine. Chapel Hill won the first game of three, the Wake Forest Student wrote that North Carolina won the game because "... our boys played under two new rules and had the disadvantage in position of their goal." Wake Forest proceeded to win the second and third games quickly, "once they caught on to their opponent's dodges." The writers for The University Magazine retorted that "there were many more rules which were strange to the University than to the Wake Forest team." They further wrote that most of the third party witnesses to the game, felt North Carolina was more organized and ran better.

In late October, following Wake Forest-UNC, The News and Observer wrote that interest in football was growing in the area and a Carolina student wrote in and stated a football "association" had started recently with 89 members. Funds had been allocated to the group in order to equip and "keep up a team in suitable style," while more money was needed to order uniforms. He wrote of the goal to help establish an inter-collegiate state league to help "make the Old North State still prouder of her boys." In response to this letter from a UNC student, a Trinity student crafted a letter to The News and Observer on October 30 stating Trinity had first started to organize an association for football in January 1888 and hoped for an inter-collegiate state league then. In that same letter, the student announced that a game was scheduled to be played in Greensboro, North Carolina on Thanksgiving Day. Excitement was growing around football "everywhere" as the game against Trinity approached. The game was moved to a baseball park in Raleigh and a large crowd was expected to come. In preparation, Trinity purchased uniforms for over $100.

The next game organized for the university came against Trinity on November 29 on Thanksgiving Day at 2:30 PM local time in what was referred to as the first "scientific" game of football. The teams utilized the American Inter-collegiate Association's rules. In front of an estimated crowd of 600, Chapel Hill won the toss. It took nearly twenty minutes for Trinity scored the first touchdown with Durham S. and they made the goal after . Prior to halftime, Trinity's Daniels scored another touchdown and goal after before the university team maintained the ball in Trinity's half but could not score before time ran out. Going into the ten minute halftime, Trinity led 12–0. Chapel Hill got the ball after kicking off to start the second half, but could not manage to score, missing a potential 5-point drop kick by "a few feet." Trinity scored one last touchdown, but missed the goal after touchdown bringing the score to 16–0, which proved to be the last. Despite having some good runs, North Carolina showed good sportsmanship after the loss as they "... gave three cheers for Trinity which were returned with a will." North Carolina's Geo. Graham was thought by The University Magazine to be the best all-around player of the game, while Trinity felt their team captain Johnson was just as good. As a whole The News and Observer wrote that play by both sides was "excellent," but Trinity played better and, particularly, their half-backs "sacrificed personal plays for the benefit of team work." The paper noted Daniels and Rahders of Trinity, along with Graham of university were the stand outs.

=== Formation of the North Carolina Inter-Collegiate Football Association ===
Later that day following the Trinity–University game, officials from Trinity College, Wake Forest College, and met in Raleigh, North Carolina and formed the North Carolina Inter-Collegiate Football Association (NCIFA). The first NCIFA president was announced to be Trinity's J. F. Jones, while W. C. Down of Wake Forest and S. C. Bragaw of Chapel Hill were named secretary and treasurer, respectively. The constitution that was agreed upon was based on the American Inter-collegiate Association's own constitution. Wake Forest's team and North Carolina's sophomore class team, which Wake Forest won 2 scores to 1. The game which featured a best of three format, Chapel Hill won the first game and Wake Forest the next two. The writers for "The University Magazine" wrote that the game featured two new rules the North Carolina team did not use prior and felt the games were "unfair." A stipulation of the new association is that each team would play one game with each of the other teams in the group and the team that won the largest number of games will be the champion.

The 1889 Inter-collegiate Football Association was to be played in February 1889 with one game on the 18th and 22nd. The first game was to between Wake Forest and UNC, while the second was between Trinity and Wake Forest. Both games were to be played in Raleigh. By February 13, the game between Trinity and UNC had not been scheduled. The Wake Forest-Chapel Hill game was highly anticipated and both teams were reported to be putting in good practice. Governor Fowle was hoping to attend the match, but had to leave for New Bern, North Carolina instead. Due to weather on February 17, the Wake Forest-Chapel Hill football game on February 18 was postponed. Despite Trinity's teams showing up, their match against Wake Forest was postponed due to nine inches of snow that had fallen since the night before. The Wilmington Messenger wrote that "University and Wake Forest College teams was again necessarily postponed."

The game between Wake Forest and Chapel Hill, the first game of the NCIFA, took place on Friday March 1, 1889 at 4:00 PM local time at the "Athletic Grounds" in Raleigh, where the university team won 33–0 in front of a crowd of around 500 people. Chapel Hill began in a V formation and gained 25 yards on the first play. Bragaw scored a touchdown, but Graham missed the point after goal as the game reached 15 minutes played, making the score 4–0. North Carolina scored again with Rhem and made the point after to get six points. Wake Forest managed to push the ball into the university's territory, but failed to score. Bragaw scored another touchdown and Graham missed the point after. There were no more scores before halftime, leaving the score 14–0. Wake Forest got the ball at the start of the second half and drove into the university's half. However, they could not advance and even were pushed back into their own half and eventually scored a safety, bring the score to 16–0. North Carolina's Graham made a 40-yard drop kick to get another five points. Wake Forest scored a safety again and Carolina's Howell and Bragaw followed with a touchdown apiece, with Graham only making one goal after touchdown between the two scores. The final score was 33–0. The News and Observer wrote that Wake Forest was "out witted at every point," especially with the V formation that was used by the Chapel Hill team. North Carolina's Bragaw had great runs, while George Graham kicked well. Wake Forest's Dowd played the well, but "had no support." Governor Daniel Gould Fowle and Wake Forest President Taylor were in attendance. The News and Observer wrote that North Carolina was "well-trained," great at their respective positions, and heavier than Wake Forest.

The Trinity-Chapel Hill game was expected the following Friday, March 8. Trinity and North Carolina played another game at the "Athletic Grounds" in Raleigh at 2:30 PM local time, large crowds were expected and the field was reported as dry. The teams were thought to be well matched and the best game of the season was expected. Due to the late arriving crowd, which totaled roughly 700 in number, the game started at 2:45 PM. Trinity won the coin toss and chose to receive, which let North Carolina chose the goal. Trinity started off with the ball and assembled in a V formation, which was stopped by North Carolina. The university obtained the ball from a fumble and got the ball close to the goal line. Before three minutes of game time elapsed, Graham scored touchdown, but failed to get the point after goal. Nearly two minutes later, Bragaw became injured in a play near the Trinity goal line and had to withdraw from the game, he was tackled by Trinity's Daniels and his own teammate Murphy "jumped on them and crushed them to the ground." (Note: The University Magazine wrote that Bragaw broke his right leg, while The Progressive Farmer wrote that he dislocated his ankle.) This caused the university's Little to move from guard to half-back and Snipes moved in on the line to replace Little. Graham scored two more touch downs without making any goals after touchdown to make the score 12–0 in North Carolina's favor. The university stopped Trinity short of their goal and prevented a score and obtained possession of the ball, they proceeded to move down the field and score by way of a drop kick adding another 5 points. With limited time left in the half, Trinity gradually pushed until Crowell was able to score a touchdown, but Durham missed the goal after. The score going into half time was 17–4 in favor of North Carolina.

After the university failed with the V formation to open the second half and gained around 15 yards before being pushed back. Trinity primarily had possession of the ball for the second half. Trinity's Durham scored three touchdowns (of which only one made a point after goal) and the university had one safety to make the score 20–17 in favor of Trinity. Trinity's Durham made field kick as the game's time expired making the final score 25–17. The University Magazine noted that Trinity attempted to run the ball around ends to open the game and was unsuccessful, then they switched to pushing the ball and made all their scores by pushing through North Carolina's center. The magazine stated that switching Little from the guard position hurt the university's team and ability to stop the pushing through and felt the loss came due to Bragaw's injury. The News and Observer wrote that it was "one of the great games every played in the South."

== Aftermath and legacy ==
The University Magazine wrote that a man from Princeton University was coming to Chapel Hill to instruct the boys on football. The final game of the association was played between Wake Forest and Trinity on March 29, where Wake Forest won 32–0. After the completion of the game, the three-game "championship series" was done and six total games were played, with each team having a victory. With this final result, the first season of the football association was undecided with each team winning a game. Trinity scored a total of 25 points, Wake Forest: 32, and the university: 50. NCIFA president Jones received word that Greensboro was finishing their grounds and could host football games in favor of Raleigh, where prices were higher.

== See also ==
- List of the first college football game in each US state
