= 1888 Wake Forest Baptists football team =

American college football season

1888 Wake Forest Baptists football
- Conference: Independent
- Record: 2–1
- Head coach: W. C. Dowd (1st season)
- Captain: W. C. Dowd

1888 Southern college football independents records
	Conf.			Overall
Team	W	L	T	W		L		T
Georgetown		–		4	–	2	–	0
Trinity (NC)		–		2	–	1	–	0
Virginia		–		2	–	1	–	0
Wake Forest		–		2	–	1	–	0
Johns Hopkins		–		6	–	5	–	0
Richmond		–		1	–	2	–	0
North Carolina		–		1	–	3	–	0
Navy		–		1	–	4	–	0
Gallaudet		–				–
Randolph–Macon		–				–
St. John's (MD)		–				–

The 1888 Wake Forest Baptists football team was an American football team that represented Wake Forest College during the 1888 college football season. In its first year of intercollegiate football, the team defeated North Carolina by a 6–4 score in a game played on October 18, 1888, at the State Fair Grounds in Raleigh, North Carolina. After the game, The News & Observer wrote:

"Decidedly one of the most interesting features of the whole fair was the game of foot ball yesterday between Wake Forest and Chapel Hill, resulting in a victory for Wake Forest. The game was exciting and was played by excellent teams on both sides. It was witnessed by a tremendous crowd. The players were uniformed and were a skilled and active set of boys."

W. C. Dowd was the coach of the Wake Forest team. The game was the first intercollegiate football game played in the state of North Carolina. The game was also the first in the history of the North Carolina Tar Heels football program.

== Schedule ==
Date	Time	Opponent	Site	Result	Attendance	Source
October 18	3:00 p.m.	vs. North Carolina	State Fairgrounds; Raleigh, NC (rivalry)	W 6–4		
March 1, 1889	4:00 p.m.	vs. North Carolina	Athletic Grounds; Raleigh, NC	L 0–33	500	
March 29, 1889	3:30 p.m.	vs. Trinity (NC)	Athletic Grounds; Raleigh, NC	W 32–0		
