= 1979 Tangerine Bowl =

American college football game

LSU Tigers	Wake Forest Demon Deacons
(6–5)	(8–3)
SEC	ACC
34	10
Head coach: Charles McClendon	Head coach: John Mackovic
	1	2	3	4	Total
LSU	14	10	0	10	34
Wake Forest	0	3	7	0	10
- Date: December 22, 1979
- Season: 1979
- Stadium: Orlando Stadium
- Location: Orlando, Florida
- MVP: David Woodley, LSU (overall); Jerry Murphree, LSU (offensive); Benjy Thibodeaux, LSU (defensive)
- Attendance: 38,666
- Payout: US$150,000 per school

The 1979 Tangerine Bowl was an American college football bowl game that was played on December 22, 1979 at Orlando Stadium in Orlando, Florida. The game matched the LSU Tigers against the Wake Forest Demon Deacons. It was the final contest of the 1979 NCAA Division I-A football season for both teams. The game ended in a 34–10 victory for the Tigers.

== Teams ==
The game matched the LSU Tigers of the Southeastern Conference against the Wake Forest Demon Deacons of the Atlantic Coast Conference. The Tigers had a conference record of 4–2 and the Demon Decons had a conference record of 3–2. The game was the first bowl game featuring the Tigers and the Demon Deacons, and was their third overall meeting. LSU led the series 2–0 heading into the game.

The teams' first meeting was in 1960, when the Tigers defeated the Demon Deacons 16–0. The teams also played in 1978, with LSU prevailing 13-11 at Baton Rouge.

LSU entered the matchup looking to end a four-game bowl skid, dating to a 33-15 decision over Iowa State in the 1971 Sun Bowl.

== Finale for "Cholly Mac" ==
The game was the last for LSU coach Charles McClendon, who was stepping down after 18 seasons at the helm of the Bayou Bengals. Bo Rein was named McClendon's successor 22 days prior to the bowl.

Ironically, Rein coached North Carolina State to victory over Wake Forest en route to the 1979 ACC championship. The Wolfpack, however, did not play in a bowl game, while three other ACC teams which finished below NC State (Wake Forest, Clemson and North Carolina), did.

McClendon had been at LSU since 1955. He was defensive coordinator under Paul Dietzel from 1955–61, helping the Tigers win the national championship in 1958. Dietzel left to coach Army following the 1961 season.

In 1978, Dietzel returned to LSU as its athletic director. He was fired in February 1982 after the LSU Board of Supervisors discovered gross financial mismanagement within the school's athletic department under Dietzel's watch.

== Game summary ==
=== Scoring summary ===
Scoring summary

Quarter	Time	Drive			Team	Scoring information	Score	
Quarter	Time	Plays	Yards	TOP	Team	Scoring information	LSU	WF
1	9:08	12	80	5:52	LSU	David Woodley 13-yard touchdown run, Don Barthel kick good	7	0
1	4:14	6	35	2:44	LSU	David Woodley 3-yard touchdown run, Don Barthel kick good	14	0
2	3:28	5	91	1:39	LSU	Jerry Murphree 19-yard touchdown reception from David Woodley, Don Barthel kick good	21	0
2	2:53	4	4	0:26	LSU	31-yard field goal by Don Barthel	24	0
2	0:00	6	40	0:45	WF	43-yard field goal by Phil Denfeld	24	3
3	11:45	8	80	3:15	WF	Wayne Baumgardner 19-yard touchdown reception from Jay Venuto, Frank Harnisch kick good	24	10
4	12:17	6	7	3:07	LSU	41-yard field goal by Don Barthel	27	10
4	8:32	6	42	1:57	LSU	Steve Ensminger 3-yard touchdown run, Don Barthel kick good	34	10
"TOP" = time of possession. For other American football terms, see Glossary of American football.							34	10

=== Statistics ===
Statistics	LSU	WF
Plays–yards	81–496	64–263
Rushes–yards	55–223	34–30
Passing yards	273	233
Passing: Comp–Att–Int	26–16–1	30–15–4

== Aftermath ==
LSU and Wake Forest have not played each other in football since this game.

The victory gave McClendon a final record of 137-59-7. He still holds LSU records for longest tenure and most victories. He was named Executive Director of the American Football Coaches Association in 1980 after serving as its president in 1979. Following his death in 2001, LSU's football practice fields were named in McClendon's honor.

No LSU coach after McClendon lasted longer than five seasons until Les Miles, who coached 11 full seasons (2005–15). Miles was fired after four games of the 2016 season.

Bo Rein perished in a plane crash on January 10, 1980. Former LSU All-American Jerry Stovall, the runner-up for the Heisman Trophy in 1962, McClendon's first year as head coach, was named Rein's successor. Stovall went 22-21-3 in four seasons before he was fired in December 1983.

Paul Dietzel was fired as LSU's athletic director in early 1982. The LSU Board of Supervisors cited mismanagement of athletic department finances as the reason for Dietzel's dismissal. Dietzel was succeeded by MIami Dolphins controller Bob Brodhead.

LSU has returned to Orlando three times to play in the Tangerine Bowl's successor, the Citrus Bowl. The Tigers lost 30-25 to Iowa in 2005 and 19-17 to Penn State in 2010 and 21-17 to Notre Dame in 2018, while defeating Louisville 29-9 in December 2016.

Demon Deacons coach John Mackovic left Winston-Salem after the 1980 season to become quarterbacks coach for the Dallas Cowboys. He was named head coach of the Kansas City Chiefs in 1983. After he was fired by Chiefs owner Lamar Hunt in January 1987, Mackovic returned to college as head coach at Illinois (1988-91), Texas (1992-97) and Arizona (2001-03).

Wake Forest did not return to a bowl game until the 1992 Independence Bowl. The Demon Deacons have played in only one bowl in Florida since this game, the 2007 Orange Bowl, which they lost 24-13 to Louisville.
