= 1992 Independence Bowl =

1992 Poulan/Weed Eater Independence Bowl
- Independence Bowl XVII
| Oregon Ducks | Wake Forest Demon Deacons |
| (6–5) | (7–4) |
| Pac-10 | ACC |
| 35 | 39 |
| Head coach: Rich Brooks | Head coach: Bill Dooley |
| | 1 | 2 | 3 | 4 | Total |
|---|---|---|---|---|---|
| Oregon | 13 | 9 | 7 | 6 | 35 |
| Wake Forest | 7 | 3 | 14 | 15 | 39 |
- Date: December 31, 1992
- Season: 1992
- Stadium: Independence Stadium
- Location: Shreveport, Louisiana
- MVP: SE Todd Dixon, Wake Forest; CB Herman O'Berry, Oregon
- Referee: Terry Monk (Big East)
- Attendance: 31,337

United States TV coverage
- Network: ESPN
- Announcers: Sean McDonough; Mike Gottfried; Steve Cyphers

The 1992 Independence Bowl was a college football postseason bowl game between the Wake Forest Demon Deacons and the Oregon Ducks.

== Background ==
The Ducks finished 6th in the Pac-10 Conference. The Demon Deacons rebounded from a 1–3 start to win six of their next seven games to finish fourth in the Atlantic Coast Conference. This was Wake Forest's first bowl game since 1979 and Oregon's first since 1990.

== Game summary ==
John Leach scored on a touchdown run to give Wake Forest a 7–0 lead. But Oregon would dominate the quarter and the first half with a Sean Burwell touchdown run from 40 yards and ended the quarter on a Herman O'Berry 24 yard fumble recovery for a touchdown to have a 13–7 lead at the end of one quarter. Wake Forest narrowed the lead on a Mike Green field goal, but Oregon increased their lead on a Vince Ferry touchdown catch from Danny O'Neil, with a Thompson field goal making it 22–10 with :47 remaining in the half. Oregon increased their lead to 29–10 on an Alex Molden interception return for a touchdown with 9:43 in the third. Wake Forest took over from this point, scoring 29 straight points in the third and fourth. Ned Moultrie made it 29–17 on a touchdown run with less than four minutes remaining in the 3rd. Todd Dixon made it 29–24 on a 30 yard touchdown catch from Keith West with :45 in the quarter. Dixon caught another touchdown pass, this time from Bobby Jones, to give the Deacons a 32–29 lead after the two point conversion succeeded. Leach scored his second touchdown from 6 yards out to make it 39–29 with 5:19 remaining. Ronnie Harris scored for the Ducks on a 10 yard touchdown pass from O'Neil to make it 39–35 (after a missed kick) with 1:05 remaining, but the Demon Deacons held on to win their first bowl game since 1946.

== Aftermath ==
Dooley retired after the bowl win, and the Demon Deacons would not return to a bowl game until 1999. As for Oregon, they returned to a bowl game three years later, in the Rose Bowl. Neither team has returned to the Independence Bowl since this game.

== Statistics ==
| Statistics | Wake Forest | Oregon |
|---|---|---|
| First downs | 18 | 17 |
| Rushing yards | 193 | 112 |
| Passing yards | 323 | 227 |
| Interceptions | 3 | 1 |
| Total yards | 516 | 339 |
| Fumbles–lost | 3–3 | 0–0 |
| Penalties–yards | 11–108 | 6–55 |
| Punts–average | 4–39.5 | 7–35.9 |
