= A. P. Hall Jr. =

American football player and coach

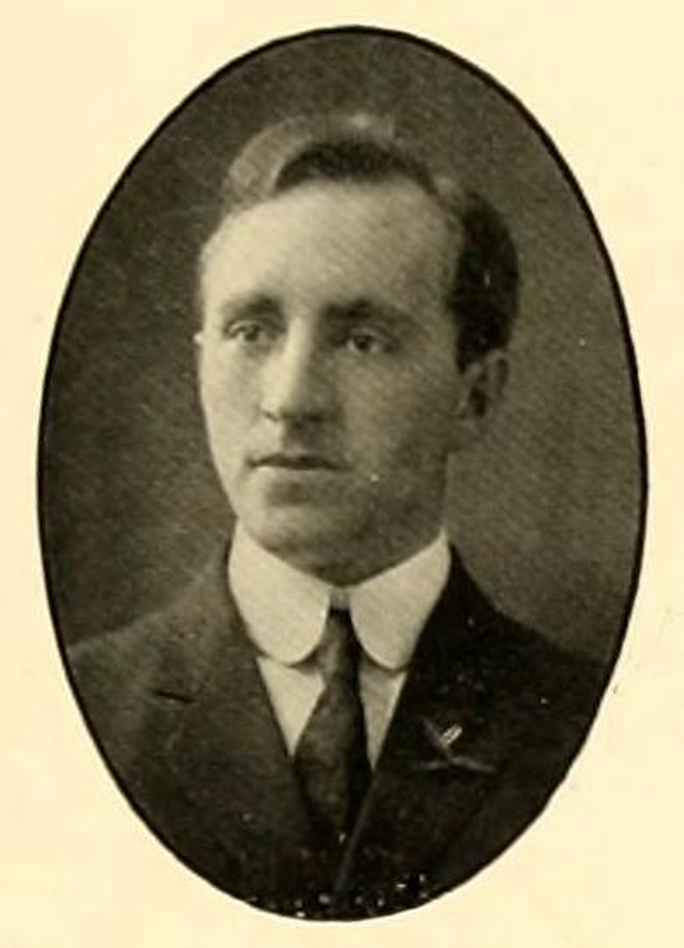
- Hall pictured in Howler 1909, Wake Forest yearbook

Biographical details
- Born: September 21, 1880; West Chester, Pennsylvania, U.S.
- Died: August 23, 1967 (aged 86); Willistown Township, Pennsylvania, U.S.

Playing career
- 1899, 1901–1902: Swarthmore
- Position: Quarterback

Coaching career (HC unless noted)
- 1907: Georgia Tech (assistant)
- 1908: Wake Forest

Head coaching record
- Overall: 1–4

Albert Paxson Hall Jr. (September 21, 1880 – August 23, 1967) was an American college football coach from West Chester, Pennsylvania. He served as the head football coach at Wake Forest University for one season in 1908, compiling a record of 1–4. He was an alumnus of the University of Pennsylvania and Swarthmore College.

Hall played at Swarthmore from 1899 to 1902. Despite being only a sophomore, he was unanimously elected team captain for the 1900 season, owing to having played for a year in high school at Swarthmore High School. Unfortunately, Hall was forced to sit out of the season after a bout with appendicitis which doctors believed he contracted while playing football. J. E. Downing was elected captain in his stead.

After spending the 1900 season refereeing, Hall was re-elected captain for the 1901 season. After serving as the team's captain for a year, he resigned as captain, ceding the role to sophomore Samuel T. Stewart. Though no longer a captain, Hall remained on the team for the 1902 season.

After graduating from Swarthmore in the spring of 1903, Hall saw his first coaching experience as the coach of the Altoona Athletic Club in 1904, where he became manager after several members of the team left to join other local clubs. In 1907, Hall resurfaced in football, this time as an assistant coach at Georgia Tech before assuming the role as a head coach the following year at Wake Forest.

Hall had a hard task as Wake Forest's football coach; he was resurrecting a program that had lay dormant since 1895, and whose team had only one member with previous playing experience. He coached the team to a 1–4 record, with his team's only win coming over Warrenton Prep. He was expected to return to Wake Forest for a second season until September 1909, at which time Wake Forest's faculty instead chose to employ A. T. Myers.

After a few years, Hall was back in Atlanta; he married Marcelle Pitot in 1911. His time in Atlanta, however, was short-lived; After coaching, Hall entered sports journalism, writing first for The West Chester Star from its inception in 1912 until 1914, at which time he moved to The Chester Times.

== Head coaching record ==
Year	Team	Overall	Conference	Standing	Bowl/playoffs
Wake Forest Baptists (Independent) (1908)
1908	Wake Forest	1–4			
Wake Forest:		1–4			
Total:		1–4			
