= W. C. Dowd =

American football player, coach, politician, and publisher (1865–1927)

Biographical details
- Born: March 21, 1865; Moore County, North Carolina, U.S.
- Died: September 23, 1927 (aged 62); Charlotte, North Carolina, U.S.

Playing career
- c. 1888: Wake Forest
- Position: Quarterback

Coaching career (HC unless noted)
- 1888: Wake Forest

Head coaching record
- Overall: 1–0

William Carey Dowd Sr. (March 21, 1865 – September 23, 1927) was an American college football player and coach, politician, and publisher. He served as the first head football coach at Wake Forest University, coaching the team for one game in 1888. Dowd later became a Speaker of the North Carolina House of Representatives and established a newspaper, The Charlotte News.

Dowd was born on March 21, 1865, in Moore County, North Carolina. He died on September 23, 1927, at his home in Charlotte, North Carolina.

== Head coaching record ==
Year	Team	Overall	Conference	Standing	Bowl/playoffs
Wake Forest Baptists (Independent) (1888)
1888	Wake Forest	1–0			
Wake Forest:		1–0			
Total:		1–0			
