= Wake Forest Demon Deacons football =

College Football organization

Wake Forest Demon Deacons
2026 Wake Forest Demon Deacons football team
- First season: 1888; 138 years ago
- Athletic director: John Currie
- Head coach: Jake Dickert; 2nd season, 18–5 (.783)
- Location: Winston-Salem, North Carolina
- Stadium: Allegacy Federal Credit Union Stadium (capacity: 31,500)
- NCAA division: Division I FBS
- Conference: ACC
- Colors: Old gold and black
- All-time record: 518–699–33 (.428)
- Bowl record: 12–6 (.667)

Conference championships
- ACC: 1970, 2006

Division championships
- ACC Atlantic: 2006, 2021
- Consensus All-Americans: 4
- Rivalries: Duke (rivalry); NC State (rivalry); North Carolina (rivalry)

Uniforms
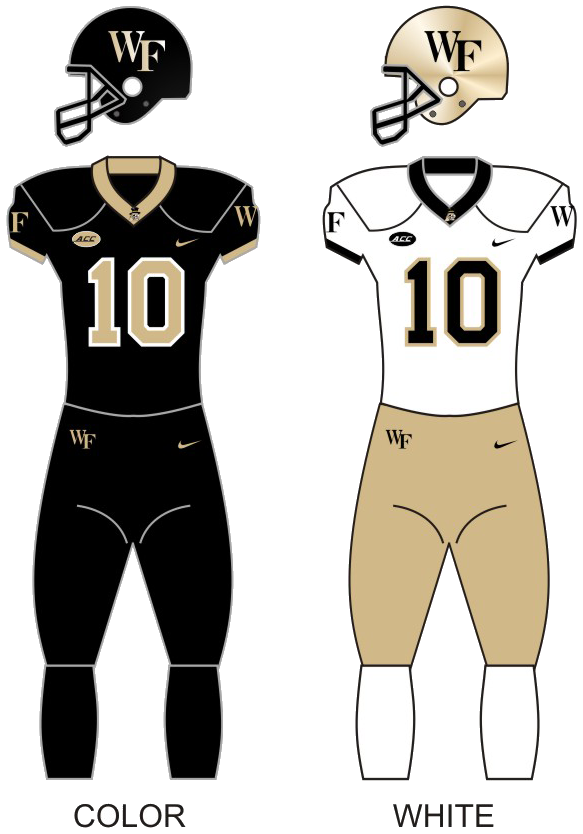
- Fight song: O' Here's to Wake Forest
- Mascot: Demon Deacon
- Marching band: The Spirit of the Old Gold & Black
- Outfitter: Nike
- Website: godeacs.com

The Wake Forest Demon Deacons football team represents Wake Forest University in the sport of American football. The Demon Deacons compete in the Football Bowl Subdivision (FBS) of the National Collegiate Athletic Association (NCAA) and the Atlantic Division of the Atlantic Coast Conference (ACC). Wake Forest plays its home football games at Allegacy Federal Credit Union Stadium and is coached by Jake Dickert.

Wake Forest struggled in football for much of the second half of the 20th century. The university is the sixth-smallest school in FBS in terms of undergraduate enrollment (behind only Rice, Tulsa and the three FBS United States service academies). It is also the smallest school playing in a Power four conference. However, since the start of the 21st century, the Deacons have been mostly competitive, having made ten bowl games in the first two decades.

== History ==
=== Early history (1888–1972) ===
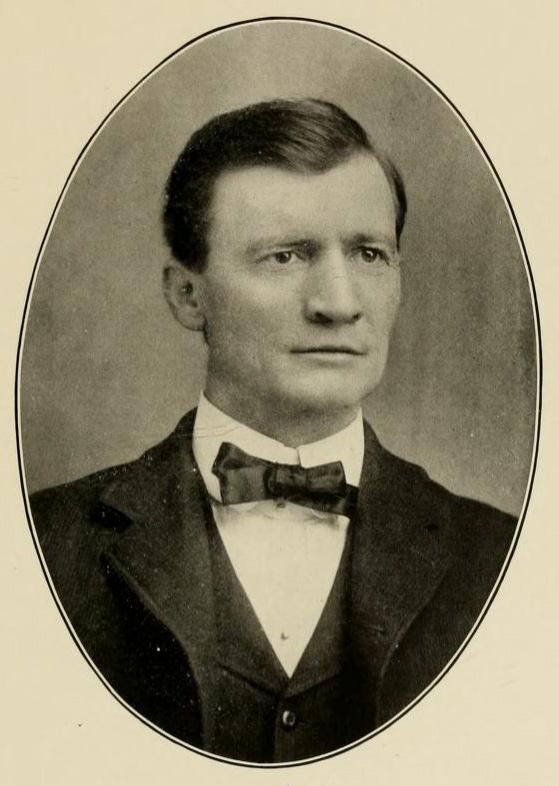
W. C. Riddick, the second head coach of Wake Forest football

Wake Forest first fielded a football team in 1888. The team was coached by W. C. Dowd and W. C. Riddick. That team played only one game, and went 1–0, a victory against North Carolina in the first-ever collegiate football game played in the state of North Carolina. From 1891 to 1893, under head coach E. Walter Sikes, Wake Forest posted a 6–2–1 record. Harry Rabenhorst coached Wake Forest for two seasons, posting a 3–8 record. Hank Garrity served as head football coach from 1923 to 1924. He compiled a 19–7–1 record in those two seasons. His .704 winning percentage is the highest in Wake Forest football history. F. S. Miller served as Wake Forest's head football coach for four seasons, posting a record of 18–15–4. His first two seasons were winning seasons, 6–5–1 and 5–3–1, respectively. Jim Weaver, who would become the ACC's first commissioner, coached the Demon Deacons football team for four seasons. His final record is 10–23–1.

Peahead Walker came to the Demon Deacons from Elon and was Wake Forest's head football coach for 14 seasons, compiling a record of 77–51–6. He is tied with Jim Grobe as the winningest head football coach in Demon Deacon football history. Walker led the Deacons to two bowl games, a win over South Carolina in the inaugural Gator Bowl in 1946 and a loss to Baylor in the 1949 Dixie Bowl. He resigned after the 1950 season and was inducted into the Wake Forest Athletics Hall of Fame in 1971. Tom Rogers led the Demon Deacons from 1951 to 1955, succeeding Walker. Rogers yearly records at Wake Forest were 6–4, 5–4–1, 3–6–1, 4–7–1 and 5–4–1. In 1951, the Demon Deacons compiled a 6–4 record and finished in a tie for seventh place in the Southern Conference. End Jack Lewis and linebacker Bill George were selected by the Associated Press as first-team players on the 1951 All-Southern Conference football team. In their second season under Rogers, the Demon Deacons compiled a 5–4–1 record and finished in a tie for second place in the Southern Conference with a 5–1 record against conference opponents. End Jack Lewis was selected by the United Press as a first-team player on the 1952 All-Southern Conference football team. This was followed by a 3–6–1 campaign in 1953 that saw Wake Forest finish in a three-way tie for third place in the Atlantic Coast Conference with a 2–3 record against conference opponents. In 1954, the Demon Deacons compiled a 3–6–1 record and finished in sixth place in the Atlantic Coast Conference with a 1–4–1 record against conference opponents. End Ed Stowers and tackle Bob Bartholomew were selected by the Associated Press as first-team players on the 1954 All-Atlantic Coast Conference football team. Bartholomew was the only unanimous selection by all 43 voters. In 1955, their fifth season under Rogers, the Demon Deacons compiled a 5–4–1 record and finished in fourth place in the Atlantic Coast Conference with a 3–3–1 record against conference opponents. Tackle Bob Bartholomew was selected by both the Associated Press and the United Press International as a first-team player on the 1955 All-Atlantic Coast Conference football team. Rogers was replaced as Wake Forest head coach after five seasons.

Paul Amen, who succeeded Rogers, came to Wake Forest from his post as an assistant at Army and also struggled but managed to go 6–4 in his final season, his only winning record. He coached the Demon Deacons from 1956 to 1959. Amen was hired over another former assistant to Red Blaik, then-New York Giants offensive assistant Vince Lombardi.

In their first season under Amen, the Demon Deacons compiled a 2–5–3 record and finished in seventh place in the Atlantic Coast Conference with a 1–5–1 record against conference opponents. Halfback Billy Ray Barnes rushed for over 1,000 yards and was selected by the Associated Press as a first-team player on the 1956 All-Atlantic Coast Conference football team. Amen's 1957 team posted a winless 0–10 record. This was followed by a 3–7 season in 1958. In 1958, the Demon Deacons compiled a 6–4 record and finished in a tie for fourth place in the Atlantic Coast Conference. Quarterback Norm Snead and end Pete Manning were selected by the Associated Press and United Press International as first-team players on the 1959 All-Atlantic Coast Conference football team. Snead later played 16 seasons in the NFL and was a four-time All-Pro selection. Guard Nick Patella was selected to the All-ACC team by the UPI. Amen was selected in 1956 and 1959 as ACC Coach of the Year, however, Amen retired after four seasons. Bill Hildebrand was promoted from defensive line coach to head coach following Amen's retirement. Hildebrand, like his predecessors, struggled to find much success. His best season came in 1961 in which the Demon Deacons posted a 4–6 record. In its first season under Hildebrand, the Demon Deacons compiled a 2–8 record and finished in seventh place in the Atlantic Coast Conference (ACC). Quarterback Norm Snead was selected by the United Press International as a first-team player on the 1960 All-Atlantic Coast Conference football team. Snead later played 16 seasons in the NFL and was a four-time All-Pro selection. In 1961, its second season under head coach Hildebrand, the team compiled a 4–6 record and finished in seventh place in the Atlantic Coast Conference (ACC). Halfback Alan White was selected by the Associated Press as a first-team player on the 1961 All-Atlantic Coast Conference football team. In 1962, the team compiled a 0–10 record and finished in last place in the Atlantic Coast Conference (ACC). This was followed by a 1–9 campaign in 1963 that saw Wake Forest finish in seventh place in the Atlantic Coast Conference (ACC). After four seasons and a 7–33 overall record, Hildebrand was fired.

Bill Tate was hired as the Demon Deacons head football coach in January 1964. Tate coached the Demon Deacons for five seasons. In its first season under Tate, the team compiled a 5–5 record and finished in a three-way tie for third place in the Atlantic Coast Conference (ACC). Three players received first-team All-ACC honors from the Associated Press: fullback Brian Piccolo, quarterback John Mackovic, and end Richard Cameron. Piccolo was a unanimous selection for the all-conference team, and was also selected as a first-team All-American by Football News. He set three ACC records in 1964 with 1,044 rushing yards, 111 points scored, and 17 touchdowns. Piccolo also led the nation in 1964 in rushing yards, rushing touchdowns, and points scored. He was named the Atlantic Coast Conference (ACC) Player of the Year, yet went unselected in both the AFL and NFL drafts. Mackovic led the Demon Deacons with 1,340 passing yards while completing 89 of 195 passes. Cameron caught 29 passes for 410 yards. From 1964 to 1968, Wake Forest posted a 17–32–1 record and steadily declined year-by-year, going from 5–5 in Tate's first year worsening each year to 2–7–1 in his last. Tate won ACC Coach of the Year honors in 1964 but was fired after failing to post a winning record in any of his five seasons.

Cal Stoll was hired as Wake Forest's head coach away from Michigan State, where he served as an assistant. Stoll was able to have success with the Deacons, posting a 3–7 record his first year then back-to-back 6–5 records in his last two. In 1969, their first season under Stoll, the Demon Deacons compiled a 3–7 record and finished in seventh place in the Atlantic Coast Conference. In 1970, the team compiled a 6–5 record, finished in first place in the Atlantic Coast Conference with a 5–1 record against conference opponents. In their third season under Stoll, the Demon Deacons compiled a 6–5 record and finished in a tie for fifth place in the Atlantic Coast Conference. Stoll left Wake Forest after the 1971 season to take the head coach position at his alma mater Minnesota after initially declining the job. His final record was 15–17 and included Wake Forest's first ACC championship in 1970. Stoll won ACC Coach of the Year honors in 1970. Tom Harper was promoted from assistant coach to head coach following Stoll's departure. In their first and only season under Harper, the Demon Deacons compiled a 2–9 record and finished in a tie for last place in the Atlantic Coast Conference. Harper was replaced as Wake Forest's head football coach after the 1972 season.

=== Chuck Mills era (1973–1977) ===
Chuck Mills was hired away from Utah State and served as the Demon Deacons head football coach for five seasons, compiling an 11–43–1 record before he was fired due to the team's continued lackluster on-the-field performance. In 1973, Mills' first season, the Demon Deacons compiled a 1–9–1 record and finished in last place in the Atlantic Coast Conference. This was followed by a 1–10 record and last place finish in the Atlantic Coast Conference in 1974. Mills' third season in 1975 saw the Demon Deacons go 3–8 record and finish in fourth place in the Atlantic Coast Conference. In 1976, the Demon Deacons compiled a 5–6 record and finished in third place in the Atlantic Coast Conference. In their fifth and final season under Mills in 1977, the Demon Deacons compiled a 1–10 record and finished in last place in the Atlantic Coast Conference.

=== John Mackovic era (1978–1980) ===
Purdue offensive coordinator and associate head coach John Mackovic took over as head coach of his alma mater in 1978 and re-energized the Wake Forest football program, turning the program around from 1–10 to 8–4 in one year, for which Mackovic won ACC Coach of the Year honors. His teams were aggressive and fast. In 1979, its second season under head coach John Mackovic, the team compiled an 8–4 record, finished in fourth place in the Atlantic Coast Conference, and lost to LSU in the 1979 Tangerine Bowl. Mackovic won the Walter Camp Coach of the Year Award in 1979. In its third season under head coach John Mackovic, the team compiled a 5–6 record and finished in a three-way tie for fourth place in the Atlantic Coast Conference. Following the 1980 season, Mackovic left Wake Forest to take an assistant coaching position with the NFL's Dallas Cowboys. Mackovic's final record at Wake Forest is 14–20.

=== Al Groh era (1981–1986) ===
Under head coach Al Groh, the Demon Deacons compiled a 26–40 record. In 1981, their first season under Groh, the Demon Deacons compiled a 4–7 record and finished in sixth place in the Atlantic Coast Conference. In their second season under Groh, the Demon Deacons compiled a 3–8 record and finished in last place in the Atlantic Coast Conference. In their third season under Groh, the Demon Deacons compiled a 4–7 record and finished in a tie for last place in the Atlantic Coast Conference. Groh's best season was a 6–5 1984 season. and Groh resigned after the 1986 season, a 5–6 campaign, to take an assistant coaching position with the National Football League's Atlanta Falcons.

=== Bill Dooley era (1987–1992) ===
Bill Dooley came to Wake Forest after a brief retirement from coaching. He had previously been a head football coach at Virginia Tech and North Carolina.

In Dooley's first season, the team compiled a 7–4 record and finished in a tie for third place in the Atlantic Coast Conference. The next year, Wake Forest compiled a 6–4–1 record and finished in a tie for fourth place in the Atlantic Coast Conference. In 1989, the Demon Deacons compiled a 2–8–1 record and finished in seventh place in the Atlantic Coast Conference. The following season, Wake Forest finished with a 3–8 record and finished in last place in the Atlantic Coast Conference. In 1991, Wake Forest again finished last in the ACC with a 3–8 record. Dooley led the Demon Deacons to one bowl game, the 1992 Independence Bowl, which Wake Forest won, capping off an 8–4 season in which they finished ranked No. 25 in both the AP and Coaches Polls, respectively. Dooley re-retired after that game. Dooley retired after the 1992 season. His six seasons in Winston-Salem are tied for fourth for longest tenure and his 29 wins are third in most wins in Wake Forest history. He had three winning seasons at Wake Forest, 7–4 in 1987, 6–4–1 in 1988, and the 8–4 1992 team. Dooley's final record is 29–36–2.

=== Jim Caldwell era (1993–2000) ===
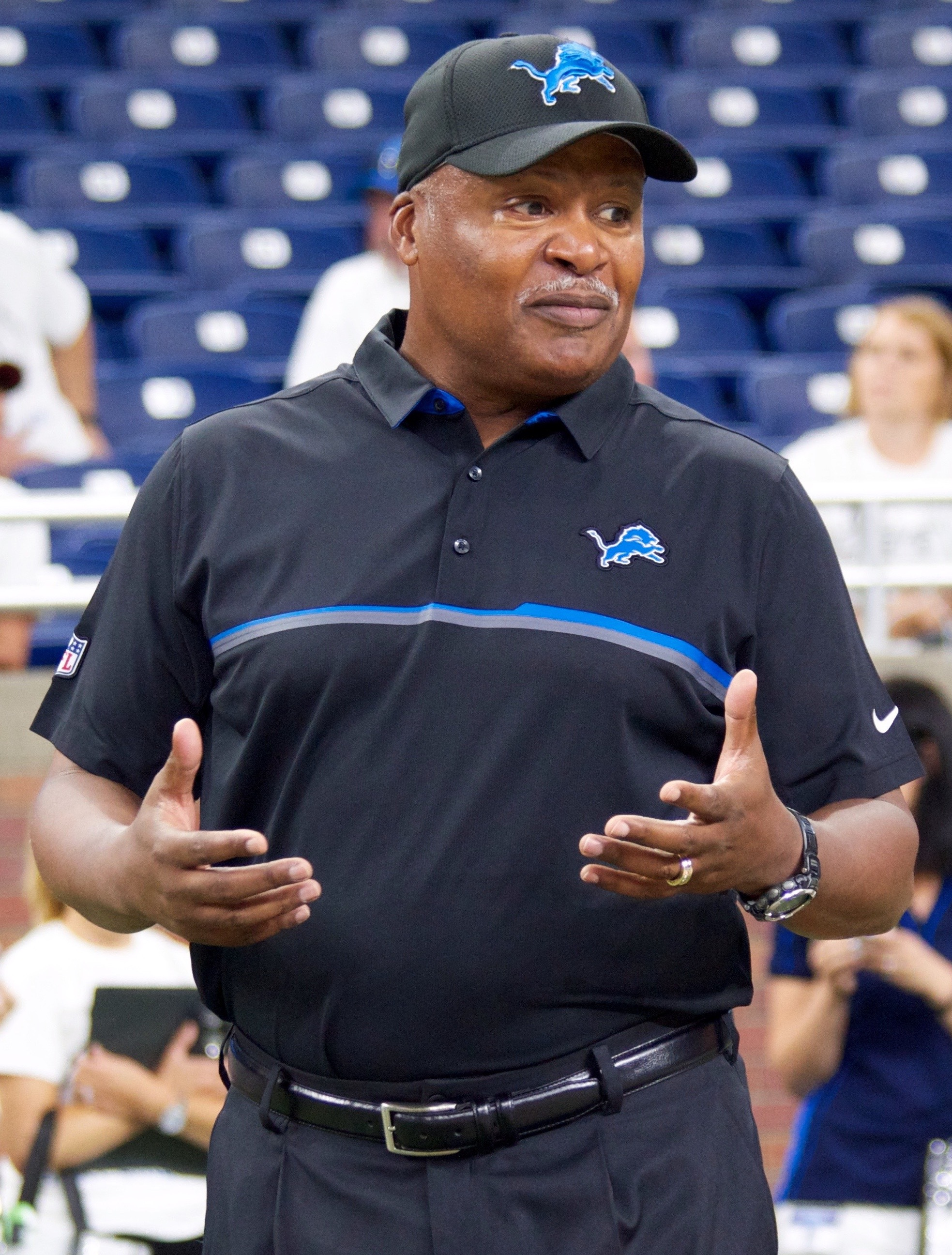
Coach Caldwell

Jim Caldwell came to Wake Forest from his post as quarterbacks coach at Penn State. Caldwell was the first African American head football coach in Wake Forest football history. Caldwell's Demon Deacons were known to pass the ball well, setting dozens of school passing records. However, they frequently struggled to run the ball; in one year, the leading rusher only ran for a total of 300 yards.

Caldwell's first season was 1993, during which the Demon Deacons compiled a 2–9 record and finished in last place in the Atlantic Coast Conference. In 1994, the Demon Deacons compiled a 3–8 record and finished in eighth place in the Atlantic Coast Conference. That was followed by a 1–10 record and last place finish in the Atlantic Coast Conference for the fourth time in five years. 1996 was another season of struggle, as the Wake Forest Demon Deacons compiled a 3–8 record and finished in a tie for sixth place in the Atlantic Coast Conference, their best such finish in the ACC in over a decade.

In 1997, the Demon Deacons compiled a 5–6 record and finished in a tie for sixth place in the Atlantic Coast Conference. The highlight of the season came on opening weekend, when the Demon Deacons upset then No. 21 Northwestern by a score of 27–20, their first win over a ranked opponent in over a decade. In 1998, the Demon Deacons compiled a 3–8 record and finished in a tie for sixth place in the Atlantic Coast Conference. That was followed by the only winning season of Caldwell's tenure, a 7–5 season capped with a win in the 1999 Aloha Bowl. In 2000, the Demon Deacons compiled a 2–9 record and finished in eighth place in the Atlantic Coast Conference. Wake Forest struggled in Caldwell's eight-year tenure, posting only one winning season. Caldwell was fired after the 2000 season. His final record at Wake Forest was 26–63.

=== Jim Grobe era (2001–2013) ===
Coach Jim Grobe came to Wake Forest from Ohio. He brought with him an aggressive defensive scheme and a philosophy of discipline and accountability for his players both on the field and off. In their first season under Grobe, the Demon Deacons compiled a 6–5 record and finished in a tie for seventh place in the Atlantic Coast Conference. In 2002, the Demon Deacons compiled a 7–6 record and finished in a tie for seventh place in the Atlantic Coast Conference. This was followed by a 5–7 campaign and seventh-place finish in the Atlantic Coast Conference.

In 2004, the Demon Deacons compiled a 4–7 record and finished in a tie for last place in the Atlantic Coast Conference. That year, Wake Forest lost a close game on homecoming to then No. 5 Florida State on a field goal with one minute remaining in the contest by a score of 20–17. In their fifth season under Jim Grobe, the Demon Deacons compiled a 4–7 record and finished in fourth place in the Atlantic Division of the Atlantic Coast Conference.

Grobe's best season was 2006, when the Demon Deacons posted an 11–2 record, won their first ACC championship in 36 years, and played in the Orange Bowl, a game they lost to Louisville. For the team's success in 2006, Grobe was awarded the ACC coach of the Year, Bobby Dodd Coach of the Year Award and AP Coach of the Year Award. Grobe's 77 wins are tied with Peahead Walker for most in Wake Forest football history.

After that 2006 season, Grobe's teams weren't able to match that level of success, winning six or more games just three times in the next seven years. Following the most successful season in team history in 2006, the 2007 team was not widely predicted to win the ACC despite returning many offensive starters from 2006. Some sports writers stated that they believed 2006 to have been a fluke and that Wake Forest was not going to win as many games in 2007, especially because of the losses on defense, including the loss of linebacker Jon Abbate to the National Football League. Wake Forest was picked to finish fourth in the Atlantic Division of the ACC in the annual preseason poll conducted by the Atlantic Coast Sports Media Association. Lindy's was the only major preseason magazine to pick Wake Forest as a Top-25 team. The team began its season with an Atlantic Coast Conference (ACC) game on Saturday, September 1, 2007, against Boston College. Wake Forest played its first season since winning the 2006 ACC championship, their first in 36 years. Wake Forest would finish the season with a 9–4 (5–3 ACC) record. A win in the 2007 Meineke Car Care Bowl against UConn gave the Deacons twenty wins over the last two seasons. In 2008, Wake Forest's 56th season as a member of the ACC the Demon Deacons began their season on August 28 at Baylor. The team finished 8–5 overall and 4–4 in ACC play, and beat Navy in the inaugural EagleBank Bowl on December 20, 2008. The 2009 season saw the Demon Deacons finish the season with a record of 5–7 and 3–5 in ACC play. The Deacons missed out on a bowl game for the first time since the 2005 season.

In 2010, the Demon Deacons had another year of struggles, finishing 3–9, 1–7 in ACC play. This was followed by a 2011 season in which the Demon Deacons finished 6–7 and 5–3 in ACC play to finish in a tie for second place in the Atlantic Division. They were invited to the Music City Bowl where they were defeated by Mississippi State by a score of 23–17. The 2012 season saw Wake Forest finish 5–7 with a 3–5 record in ACC play. Grobe resigned as head coach after the 2013 season, a 4–8 campaign, with a 77–82 overall record.

=== Dave Clawson era (2014–2024) ===
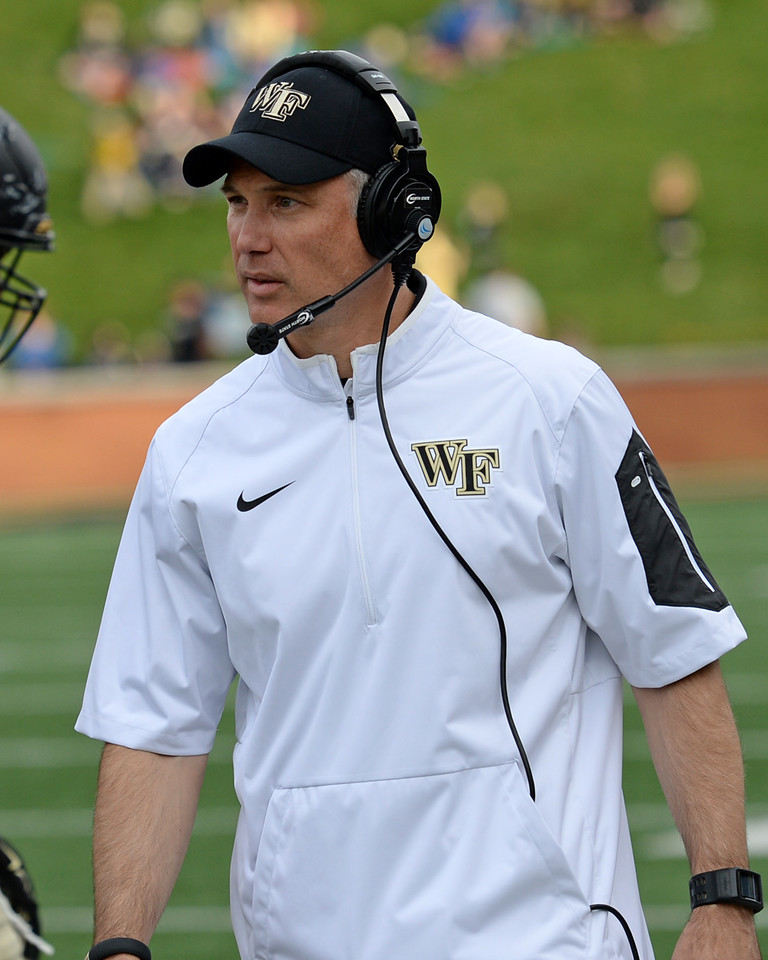
Coach Clawson

Dave Clawson was hired away from Bowling Green as the Demon Deacons head football coach, his hiring made official at a press conference on December 10, 2013. Clawson brought with him a coaching style that utilizes the team's available talent to maximize success. His offensive philosophy focuses on getting individual playmakers more touches rather than sticking to a rigidly defined system.

After posting 3–9 (1–7 ACC) seasons in 2014 and 2015, Clawson's 2016 team started the season by winning five of its first six games including road victories at Duke and Indiana. He led Wake Forest to its first bowl win in eight years, beating then No. 23 Temple 34–26 in the Military Bowl. Clawson has re-built the Deacons using a philosophy of strong recruiting classes, redshirting as many freshmen as possible, and having a strong strength and conditioning program. After the 2016 season, Wake Forest signed Clawson to a contract extension.

The Demon Deacons finished 8–5 in 2017. The Demon Deacons kicked off the season on August 31 with a 51–7 victory over FCS Presbyterian. In the season's second game, Wake defeated Boston College by a margin of 34–10. After a 46–10 drubbing of Utah State, Clawson's squad picked up their fourth win of the season in their fourth game by virtue of a 20–19 nail biter over Appalachian State. Then the Demon Deacons embarked upon a three-game losing streak, beginning with a 26–19 loss to Florida State. On October 7, Wake Forest lost to No. 2 Clemson by a score of 28–14. After a 38–24 loss to Georgia Tech, Wake posted its fifth victory of the season with a 42–32 win over Louisville with wide receiver Greg Dortch hauling in a school-record 4 TD receptions. After a 48–37 loss to No. 5 Notre Dame, the Demon Deacons ran all over Syracuse in an offensive shootout, prevailing by a margin of 64–43. After a 30–24 victory over archrival No. 25 NC State, Clawson's squad lost to rival Duke by a score of 31–23 in the regular season finale. Wake Forest was offered and accepted a berth in the 2017 Belk Bowl, a game they won over Texas A&M by a score of 55–52. The following year, they were offered and accepted a berth to the 2018 Birmingham Bowl, in which they beat Memphis 37–34. In 2019 they finished the season 8-5 after losing to Michigan State in the 2019 Pinstripe Bowl. In 2020 they finished the season 4-5 after losing to Wisconsin in the 2020 Duke's Mayo Bowl. In 2021 they became bowl eligible for the 6th straight season when they started the season 8-0 for the first time in program history.

=== Jake Dickert era (2025-present) ===
Wake Forest hired Dickert as its head football coach in December 2024, following the resignation of Dave Clawson. In his first season, Dickert set a program record for the most wins by a first-year Wake Forest head coach, leading the Demon Deacons to nine victories. The previous record of seven wins was set by Bill Dooley in 1987.

== Conference affiliations ==
Wake Forest has been independent and affiliated with two conferences.

- Independent (1888–1935)
- Southern Conference (1936–1952)
- Atlantic Coast Conference (1953–present)

== Championships ==
=== Conference championships ===
Wake Forest has two conference championships.

Year	Conference	Coach	Overall record	Conf. record
1970	ACC	Cal Stoll	6–5	5–1
2006	ACC	Jim Grobe	11–3	6–2

=== Division championships ===
Year	Division	Coach	Opponent	CG Result
2006	ACC Atlantic	Jim Grobe	Georgia Tech	W 9–6
2021	ACC Atlantic	Dave Clawson	Pittsburgh	L 21–45

== Head coaches ==
List of Wake Forest head coaches.

Tenure	Coach	Years	Record	Pct.
1888	W. C. Dowd	1	1–0	1.000
1889	W. C. Riddick	1	3–3	.500
1891–1893	E. Walter Sikes	3	6–2–1	.722
1895	No head coach	1	0–0–1	.500
1908	A. P. Hall Jr.	1	1–4	.167
1909	A. T. Myers	1	2–4	.333
1910	Reddy Rowe	1	2–7	.222
1911–1913	Frank Thompson	3	5–19	.206
1914–1915	Wilbur C. Smith	2	6–10	.375
1916	G. M. Billings	1	3–3	.500
1917	E. T. MacDonnell	1	1–6–1	.188
1918–1919	Harry Rabenhorst	2	3–8	.273
1920–1921	James L. White	2	4–15	.211
1922	George Levene	1	3–5–2	.400
1923–1925	Hank Garrity	3	19–7–1	.722
1926–1927	James A. Baldwin	2	7–10–3	.425
1928	Stan Cofall	1	2–6–2	.300
1929–1932	Pat Miller	4	18–15–4	.541
1933–1936	Jim Weaver	4	10–23–1	.309
1937–1950	Peahead Walker	14	77–51–6	.597
1951–1955	Tom Rogers	5	21–25–4	.460
1956–1959	Paul Amen	4	11–26–3	.313
1960–1963	Bill Hildebrand	4	7–33	.175
1964–1968	Bill Tate	5	17–32–1	.350
1969–1971	Cal Stoll	3	15–17	.469
1972	Tom Harper	1	2–9	.182
1973–1977	Chuck Mills	5	11–43–1	.209
1978–1980	John Mackovic	3	14–20	.412
1981–1986	Al Groh	6	26–40	.394
1987–1992	Bill Dooley	6	29–36–2	.448
1993–2000	Jim Caldwell	8	26–63	.292
2001–2013	Jim Grobe	13	77–82	.484
2014–2024	Dave Clawson	11	67–69	.493
2025–present	Jake Dickert	2	13–5	.722

== Bowl games ==
Wake Forest has played in 18 bowls in its history and owns a 12–6 record in those games. For the 2006 season, the school earned a bid to its first ever BCS game, with an Orange Bowl match-up against Louisville. Wake also had played in the 1982 Mirage Bowl in Tokyo, Japan against Clemson. However, because this game was played during the regular season, the NCAA does not recognize it as an official bowl game. Wake also competed in the 1951, 1953, 1954 Tobacco Bowl in Richmond, Virginia. According to the NCAA, it doesn't count as an official bowl game since this game isn't a postseason bowl.

== Rivalries ==
Wake Forest is referred to as being a part of "Tobacco Road" or the Big Four, terms that refer to the four North Carolina schools that compete heatedly against each other within the ACC. Wake Forest swept the series with its Tobacco Road rivals in 1924, 1951, 1970, 1984, 1987, 2006, 2007, and 2019.

=== Clemson ===
The series with Clemson has been played 89 times with the bordering state schools meeting every year uninterrupted since 1933 except for 1934 and 1952. Both universities were founding members of the Atlantic Coast Conference in 1953 and were both placed in the same division when the conference split into non-geographical divisions in 2005, thereby ensuring an annual meeting between the rivals. Despite the end of ACC divisions after the 2022 season, the teams will meet during the 2024 regular season. As of the completion of the 2023 season, Clemson leads the all-time series 71–17–1.

=== Duke ===
Wake Forest shares a football rivalry with Duke University. This rivalry started due to the schools' historical religious affiliations and close proximity to one another within the state of North Carolina (Wake Forest University was originally located in the town of Wake Forest before moving to Winston-Salem in 1956). Duke was originally known as Trinity College and the athletic teams were known as the Methodists, while Wake Forest's athletic teams were known at the time as the Baptists. The series is 61–40–2 in favor of Duke. Duke won the most recent matchup in 2025 by a score of 49–32. This matchup was the key final victory to propel Duke to qualify for the ACC championship game, which it would end up winning over Virginia. As of 2025, Wake Forest and Duke are thus the only Tobacco Road schools with ACC championship game victories since its inception. With the exception of 2020 due to the COVID-19 pandemic, these teams have played each other in consecutive years uninterrupted since 1921, one of the longest-continued rivalries in college football with both teams not skipping a beat.

=== NC State ===
Wake Forest and in-state rival NC State face each other every year and is a protected rivalry within the ACC. The rivalry is also the longest continuous rivalry between two ACC schools, having been played every year since 1910, as well as being the fourth longest continuous rivalry in NCAA history. Although the series has been interrupted since its inception, it has been uninterrupted since 1910, tying it with Oklahoma/Oklahoma St. for the second-longest continuous rivalry in FBS Division I college football, after only Minnesota/Wisconsin (uninterrupted since 1907). The Lafayette/Lehigh game in the FCS college football subdivision has been played, uninterrupted, since 1897. Wake Forest trails in the series 43–70–6 through the 2025 season.

=== North Carolina ===
Wake Forest defeated North Carolina 6–4 on October 18, 1888, during the first intercollegiate football game played in the state of North Carolina. Wake's all-time record against UNC is 36–68–2.

== Retired jerseys ==
The Demon Deacons have retired five jerseys.

Wake Forest Demon Deacons retired jerseys
No.	Player	Pos.	Tenure
16	Norm Snead	QB	1957–1960
19	Bill Armstrong	DB	1973–1976
31	Brian Piccolo	HB	1961–1964
33	Billy Ray Barnes	HB	1953–1956
47	Bill George	LB	1947–1950

== Individual award winners ==
=== Player ===
- First Team All-American Selections

1976 – Bill Armstrong (consensus)
2005 – Ryan Plackimeier (unanimous)
2007 – Steve Justice (consensus)
2008 – Alphonso Smith (consensus)

- ACC 25th Anniversary Football Team

Billy Ray Barnes
Bill Armstrong

- ACC 50th Anniversary Football Team

Bill Armstrong
Brian Piccolo
Norm Snead

- ACC All Decade Football Teams

(2000–2009) Chris Barclay, Steve Justice, Ryan Plackemeier, Aaron Curry, Alphonso Smith

- All SoCon selections

1936 – Raleigh Daniel
1938 – Louis Trunzo, Marshall Edwards
1939 – Rupert Pate, John Polanski
1940 – Tony Gallovich
1941 – Carl Givler
1942 – Pat Preston, Red Cochran, Buck Jones
1943 – Nick Sacrinty, Elmer Barbour, Bill Starford
1944 – Nick Sacrinty, Elmer Barbour, Dick Foreman, John Kerns, George Owens, Dave Harris
1945 – Nick Sacrinty, Dave Harris, Dick Foreman, Buck Garrison, Rock Brinkley, Pride Ratterree
1946 – Nick Sacrinty, Bob Leonetti, Nick Ognovich
1947 – Jim Duncan, Tom Fetzer, Harry Clark, Ed Royston,
1948 – Jim Duncan, Tom Fetzer, Bill George, Red O'Quinn, Bill Gregus
1949 – Jim Duncan, Bill Miller, Bill George, Red O'Quinn, Bill Gregus, Ray Cicia, Carroll Blackerby
1950 – Jack Lewis, Bill Miller, Guido Scarton, Jim Staton, Bob Auffarth, Ed Listopad
1951 – Jack Lewis, Bill Finnance, Dickie Davis, Bill Link, Bill George, Jim Zarkas, Guido Scarton
1952 – Jack Lewis, Bill Finnance, Joe Koch, Sonny George, Ken Bridges, Bob Gaona

- All ACC selections

1953 – Bob Bartholomew, Gerald Huth
1954 – Bob Bartholomew, Ed Stowers, Gerald Huth
1955 – Bob Bartholomew, Billy Ray Barnes
1956 – Billy Ray Barnes, Eddie Moore
1958 – Norm Snead, Pte Manning
1959 – Norm Snead, Pete Manning, Nick Patella
1960 – Norm Snead, Wayne Wolff
1961 – Alan White, Bill Hull, Bill Ruby
1964 – Brian Piccolo, John Mackovic
1965 – Joe Carazo
1966 – Bob Oplinger, Robert Grant
1967 – Rick Decker, Freddie Summers
1968 – Digit Laughride
1969 – Joe Dobner, John Mazalewski
1970 – Bill Bobbora, Larry Hopkins, Larry Russel, Ed Stetz, Tracy Lounsbury, Win Headley
1971 – Bill Bobbora, Larry Hopkins, Larry Russel, Ed Stetz, Steve Bowden
1972 – Chuck Ramsey, Nick Arcaro
1973 – Chuck Ramsey
1975 – Bill Armstrong, Clark Gaines
1976 – Bill Armstrong, Steve Young (TE), James McDougald, Don Cervi
1977 – Steve Young (TE), Larry Tearry, James McDougald
1979 – Wayne Baumgardner, Jay Venuto, James McDougald, James Parker
1980 – Bill Ard, Jay Venuto, Carlos Bradley
1981 – Phil Denfeld
1982 – Phil Denfeld, Tim Ryan, Harry Newsome
1983 – Harry Newsome
1984 – Gary Baldinger, Ronnie Burgess
1985 – Gary Baldinger, James Brim
1986 – James Brim, Tim Morrison, Paul Kiser
1987 – Mark Young, Jimmie Simmons, A.J. Green (DB)
1988 – A.J. Green (DB), Martin Bailey
1989 – Ricky Proehl
1990 – John Henry Mills
1991 – John Henry Mills, George Coghill
1992 – John Henry Mills, George Coghill, Todd Dixon, Ben Coleman
1993 – Dred Booe
1995 – Tucker Grace
1998 – Desmond Clark
1999 – Dustin Lyman, Morgan Kane, Bryan Ray, Fred Robbins
2001 – Michael Collins, Tarence Williams, Nate Bolling, Calvin Pace, John Stone, Vince Azzolina, Ray Thomas
2002 – Blake Henry, Calvin Pace, Fabian Davis, Tarence Williams, Mark Moroz, Tyson Clabo, Eric King, Quintin Williams, Montique Sharpe, Ray Thomas
2003 – Tyson Clabo, Eric King, Ryan Packemeier, Chris Barclay, Mark Moroz
2004 – Chris Barclay, Ryan Plackemeier, Steve Vallos, Eric King, Jon Abbate
2005 – Chris Barclay, Ryan Plackemeier, Josh Gattis, Steve Vallos, Jon Abbate
2006 – Steve Justice, Steve Vallos, Jon Abbate, Josh Gattis, Sam Swank, Riley Skinner, Jyles Tucker, Patrick Ghee, Sam Swank, Chip Vaughn
2007 – Steve Justice, Kenneth Moore, Alphonso Smith, Josh Adams, Aaron Curry, Sam Swank, Kevin Marrion, Chip Vaughn
2008 – D.J. Boldin, Aaron Curry, Alphonso Smith, Boo Robinson, Riley Skinner
2009 – John Russell, Riley Skinner, Marshall Williams, Chris DeGeare, Kenny Okoro
2011 – Chris Givens, Josh Bush, Joe Looney, Nikita Whitlock, Merrill Noel
2012 – Michael Campanaro, Nikita Whitlock, Kevin Johnson, A.J. Marshall
2013 – Nikita Whitlock, Michael Campanaro, Kevin Johnson, Ryan Janvion

2014 - Tylor Harris 2015 - Brandon Chubb, Alex Kinal 2016 - Mike Weaver, Jessie Bates, Marquel Lee 2017 - Cam Serigne, Ryan Anderson, John Wolford, Greg Dortch, Mike Weaver, Duke Ejiofor 2018 - Greg Dortch, Phil Haynes, Essang Bassey, Cameron Glenn 2019 - Sage Surratt, Boogie Basham, Nick Sciba, Dom Maggio The ACC and SoCon All Decade, and the all–conference lists aren't complete. The all–conference lists include selections for 1st team, 2nd team, and honorable mention.

- ACC Male Athlete of the Year

Brian Piccolo – 1965

- ACC Player of the Year

Billy Ray Barnes – 1956
Brian Piccolo – 1964
Jay Venuto – 1979
Chris Barclay – 2005

- ACC Offensive Player of the Year

Chris Barclay – 2005

- Ray Guy Award

Ryan Plackemeier – 2005

- ACC Rookie of the Year

James McDougald – 1976
Michael Ramseur – 1982
Riley Skinner – 2006
Josh Adams – 2007

- ACC Offensive Rookie of the Year

Josh Adams – 2007

- ACC Defensive Rookie of the Year

Merrill Noel – 2011

- ACC Brian Piccolo Award

Kenny Duckett – 1982
John Piedmonte – 1983
John Lewis – 1996
Matt Robinson – 2007
Greg Dortch – 2018
Sam Hartman – 2022

- Butkus Award

Aaron Curry – 2008

- Jacobs Blocking Award

James Ringgold (SoCon) – 1939
Elmer Barbour (SoCon) – 1943
Nick Ognovich (SoCon) – 1945, 1946, 1947
Paul Kiser (ACC) – 1986
Ben Coleman (ACC) – 1992
Steve Justice (ACC) – 2007

- Pro Football Hall of Fame

Bill George – 1974

- Canadian Football Hall of Fame

Red O'Quinn - 1981
Ed George - 2005

=== Coaches ===
- ACC Coach of the Year

Paul Amen – 1956, 1959
Bill Tate – 1964
Cal Stoll – 1970
John Mackovic – 1979
Bill Dooley – 1987, 1992
Jim Grobe – 2006
Dave Clawson - 2021

- Walter Camp Coach of the Year

John Mackovic – 1979

- Associated Press Coach of the Year

Jim Grobe – 2006

- Bobby Dodd Award

Jim Grobe – 2006

== Current NFL players ==
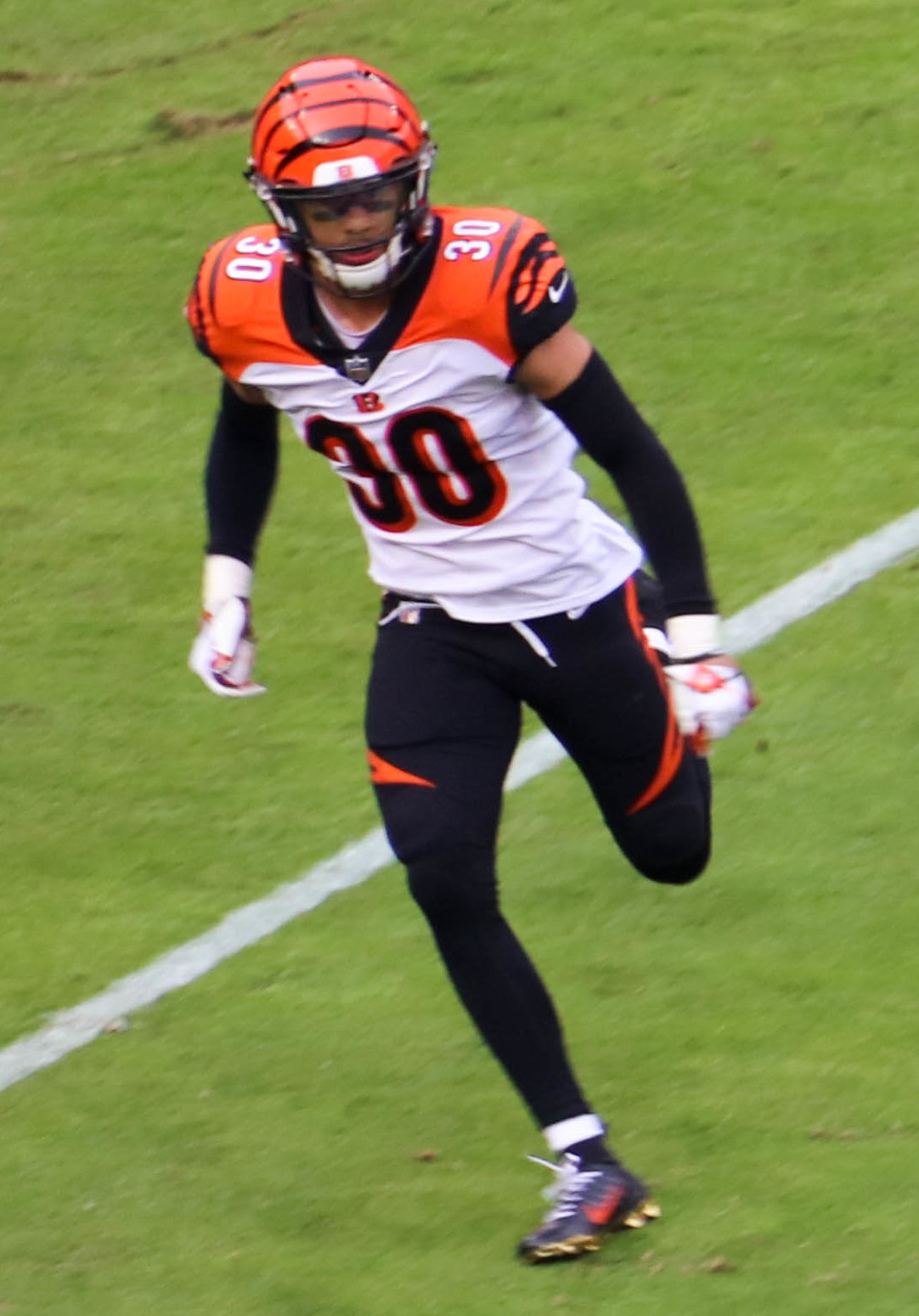
Jessie Bates III (2018)
Player	Position	NFL team
J.J. Roberts	S	Tampa Bay Buccaneers
Jessie Bates III	S	Jacksonville Jaguars
Malik Mustapha	S	San Francisco 49ers
Zach Tom	OT	Green Bay Packers
Ja'Sir Taylor	CB	Los Angeles Chargers
Kobie Turner	DT	Los Angeles Rams
Greg Dortch	WR	Arizona Cardinals
A.T. Perry	WR	Denver Broncos
Boogie Basham	LB	Carolina Panthers
Caelen Carson	CB	Dallas Cowboys
Justin Strnad	LB	Denver Broncos
Luke Masterson	LB	Las Vegas Raiders
Michael Jurgens	C	Minnesota Vikings
Blake Whiteheart	TE	Cleveland Browns
Justin Herron	OT	New Orleans Saints
Luiji Vilain	LB	Dallas Cowboys
Alex Bachman	WR	Las Vegas Raiders

== Other notable players ==
- Jon Abbate – Former NFL linebacker; the central figure in The 5th Quarter, a 2011 feature film on Wake's 2006 season after his brother (Luke Abbate) died in a car accident.
- Richard Burr – Former Republican Senator of North Carolina
- Tyler Cameron – Model and former contestant on The Bachelorette
- Jim Clack – Former NFL center who won Super Bowl rings with the Pittsburgh Steelers and also played for the New York Giants
- George Coghill – Former NFL defensive back who won back–to–back Super Bowl rings with the Denver Broncos in 1998 and 1999.
- Charlie Crist – Former Governor of Florida
- Aaron Curry – Former first round pick of the Seattle Seahawks
- Clark Gaines – Former NFL running back, holds NFL record for most receptions in a game by a running back (3rd most receptions in a game among all players), and was the first undrafted rookie to rush for over 500 yards in a rookie season; serves as Assistant Executive Director of the NFL Players Association.
- Kendall Hinton – Current Free Agent NFL Wide Receiver who was signed by the Denver Broncos as an undrafted free agent in 2020. Playing QB during his time at Wake Forest before transitioning to WR, he made a debut as starting quarterback for one game during the 2020 season when all four Broncos’ quarterbacks were ineligible to play due to COVID-19 protocols. Hinton became the first non-professional quarterback to play significant snaps at the position in an NFL game since running back Tom Matte with the Baltimore Colts in 1965.
- Gerry Huth – Former NFL offensive guard who won 2 NFL championships (1 with the NY Giants in 1956, and the other with the Philadelphia Eagles in 1960)
- Matt James – First African-American lead in The Bachelor
- Kevin Johnson – Current NFL defensive back, former first round pick in 2015
- Brian Kuklick – Former NFL quarterback
- Rusty LaRue – Former Wake Forest quarterback and NBA player, still owns several NCAA passing records
- James MacPherson – Quarterback
- Bob McCreary – Former NFL offensive tackle
- Brian Piccolo – Former NFL running back, basis for the movie Brian's Song
- Ricky Proehl – Former NFL wide receiver who won Super Bowl rings with St. Louis and Indianapolis
- Norm Snead – Four time Pro Bowl NFL quarterback
- Freddie Summers – Former NFL defensive back

== Future non-conference opponents ==
Announced schedules as of December 16, 2025

2026	2027	2028	2029	2030	2031	2032	2037
Akron	Campbell	Elon	Norfolk State	Maryland	at Maryland	at Notre Dame	Notre Dame
at Purdue	Tulane	Purdue	Georgia State	at Georgia State			
Merrimack	vs Notre Dame (Duke's Mayo Classic)	UConn	Oregon State				
		East Carolina	at Notre Dame				
