= Tom Rogers (American football, born 1910) =

American football player and coach (1910–1990)

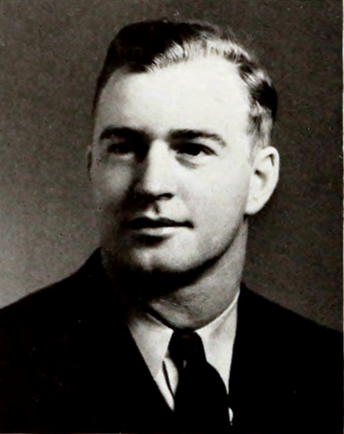
- Rogers at Clemson in 1941

Biographical details
- Born: August 26, 1910; Hinton, West Virginia, U.S.
- Died: June 16, 1990 (aged 79); Durham, North Carolina, U.S.

Playing career

Football
- 1931–1933: Duke
- Position: End

Coaching career (HC unless noted)

Football
- 1934–1937: Duke (assistant)
- 1938–1940: Wake Forest (assistant)
- 1941–1942: Clemson (ends)
- 1946–1950: Wake Forest (line)
- 1951–1955: Wake Forest

Baseball
- 1941–1942: Clemson

Head coaching record
- Overall: 21–25–4 (football); 18–14 (baseball)

Accomplishments and honors

Awards
- First-team All-SoCon (1933)

Thomas Tinsley Rogers (August 26, 1910 – June 16, 1990) was an American football player and coach of football and baseball. He served as the head football coach at Wake Forest University from 1951 to 1955, compiling a record of 21–25–4. He was also the head baseball coach at Clemson University from 1941 to 1942, tallying a mark of 18–14.

Born in 1910 and a native of Hinton, West Virginia, Rogers played college football as an end at Duke University under Wallace Wade from 1931 to 1933. He served as an assistant football coach at Wake Forest from 1938 to 1940 and at Clemson University in 1941 and 1942. After serving in the United States Navy during World War II, Rogers returned to Wake Forest as an assistant coach in 1946. He succeeded Peahead Walker as head coach there in 1951. He resigned from his post at Wake Forest in February 1956 to go into real estate development near Southport, North Carolina. Tinsley died at his home, in Durham, North Carolina, on June 16, 1990.

== Head coaching record ==
Year	Team	Overall	Conference	Standing	Bowl/playoffs
Wake Forest Demon Deacons (Southern Conference) (1951–1952)
1951	Wake Forest	6–4	5–3	T–7th	
1952	Wake Forest	5–4–1	5–1	T–2nd	
Wake Forest Demon Deacons (Atlantic Coast Conference) (1953–1955)
1953	Wake Forest	3–6–1	2–3	T–3rd	
1954	Wake Forest	2–7–1	1–4–1	6th	
1955	Wake Forest	5–4–1	3–3–1	T–4th	
Wake Forest:		21–25–4	16–14–2		
Total:		21–25–4			
