= 1889 Notre Dame football team =

American college football season

1889 Notre Dame football
- Conference: Independent
- Record: 1–0
- Head coach: None
- Captain: Edward Prudhomme

1889 Midwestern college football independents records
	Conf.			Overall
Team	W	L	T	W		L		T
Miami (OH)		–		4	–	0	–	0
Butler		–		2	–	0	–	0
Washington University		–		2	–	0	–	0
Iowa College		–		1	–	0	–	0
Lake Forest		–		1	–	0	–	0
Notre Dame		–		1	–	0	–	0
South Dakota		–		1	–	0	–	1
Minnesota		–		3	–	1	–	0
Purdue		–		2	–	1	–	0
South Dakota Agricultural		–		0	–	0	–	1
Northwestern		–		2	–	2	–	0
Cincinnati		–		1	–	1	–	0
Wabash		–		1	–	1	–	0
Michigan		–		1	–	2	–	0
Indiana		–		0	–	1	–	1
Iowa		–		0	–	1	–	0
Wisconsin		–		0	–	2	–	0

The 1889 Notre Dame football team was an American football team that represented the University of Notre Dame in the 1889 college football season. The team had no coach and played only one game during the fall of 1889, a 9–0 victory over Northwestern at Evanston, Illinois, on November 14, 1889. The victory over Northwestern University was the first over another collegiate football team for the Notre Dame Fighting Irish football program. It was also Notre Dame's first win against a future FBS football program. It would not be until 1897, with a 34–5 win against Michigan Agricultural (known today as Michigan State), that this accomplishment would be replicated.

== Schedule ==
Date	Opponent	Site	Result	Source
November 14	at Northwestern	Sheppard Field; Evanston, IL (rivalry)	W 9–0	
November 30	Albion	Notre Dame, IN	Cancelled	
