= 1889 Northwestern Purple football team =

American college football season

1889 Northwestern Purple football
- Conference: Independent
- Record: 2–2
- Head coach: None
- Captain: Erman Ridgway

1889 Midwestern college football independents records
	Conf.			Overall
Team	W	L	T	W		L		T
Miami (OH)		–		4	–	0	–	0
Butler		–		2	–	0	–	0
Washington University		–		2	–	0	–	0
Iowa College		–		1	–	0	–	0
Lake Forest		–		1	–	0	–	0
Notre Dame		–		1	–	0	–	0
South Dakota		–		1	–	0	–	1
Minnesota		–		3	–	1	–	0
Purdue		–		2	–	1	–	0
South Dakota Agricultural		–		0	–	0	–	1
Northwestern		–		2	–	2	–	0
Cincinnati		–		1	–	1	–	0
Wabash		–		1	–	1	–	0
Michigan		–		1	–	2	–	0
Indiana		–		0	–	1	–	1
Iowa		–		0	–	1	–	0
Wisconsin		–		0	–	2	–	0

The 1889 Northwestern Purple football team was an American football team that represented Northwestern University during the 1889 college football season. The team compiled a 2–2 record. Only one of the five games was an intercollegiate game, a 9–0 loss to Notre Dame on November 14, 1889, in Evanston. The game was the first meeting in the Northwestern–Notre Dame football rivalry. Northwestern also played games against Evanston High School (18–4 victory), the Chicago University Club (0–28 loss), and the Wanderers Athletic Club (22–0 victory).

== Schedule ==
Date	Opponent	Site	Result	Source
November 9	Evanston High School	Evanston, IL	W 18–4	
November 14	Notre Dame	Northwestern campus; Evanston, IL (rivalry)	L 0–9	
November 23	at Chicago University Club	Chicago Ball Grounds; Chicago, IL	L 0–29	
December 7	at Wanderers Athletic Club	Indiana Ave & 37th St.; Chicago, IL	W 22–0	
