= 1889 South Dakota Coyotes football team =

American college football season

1889 South Dakota Coyotes football
- Conference: Independent
- Record: 1–0–1
- Head coach: None

1889 Midwestern college football independents records
| | Conf. | | | Overall |
| Team | W | L | T | W | | L | | T |
|---|---|---|---|---|---|---|---|---|
| Miami (OH) | | – | | 4 | – | 0 | – | 0 |
| Butler | | – | | 2 | – | 0 | – | 0 |
| Washington University | | – | | 2 | – | 0 | – | 0 |
| Iowa College | | – | | 1 | – | 0 | – | 0 |
| Lake Forest | | – | | 1 | – | 0 | – | 0 |
| Notre Dame | | – | | 1 | – | 0 | – | 0 |
| South Dakota | | – | | 1 | – | 0 | – | 1 |
| Minnesota | | – | | 3 | – | 1 | – | 0 |
| Purdue | | – | | 2 | – | 1 | – | 0 |
| South Dakota Agricultural | | – | | 0 | – | 0 | – | 1 |
| Northwestern | | – | | 2 | – | 2 | – | 0 |
| Cincinnati | | – | | 1 | – | 1 | – | 0 |
| Wabash | | – | | 1 | – | 1 | – | 0 |
| Michigan | | – | | 1 | – | 2 | – | 0 |
| Indiana | | – | | 0 | – | 1 | – | 1 |
| Iowa | | – | | 0 | – | 1 | – | 0 |
| Wisconsin | | – | | 0 | – | 2 | – | 0 |

The 1889 South Dakota Coyotes football team was an American football team that represented the University of South Dakota as an independent during the 1889 college football season. They played 2 games and had a 1–0–1 record. It was their first season in existence.

== Schedule ==
| Date | Opponent | Site | Result | Attendance | Source |
|---|---|---|---|---|---|
| | South Dakota Agricultural | (rivalry) | T 6–6 | | |
| | Yankton | | W 11–0 | | |
