= 1889 Iowa College Pioneers football team =

American college football season

1889 Iowa College Pioneers football
- Conference: Independent
- Record: 1–0
- Head coach: None
- Home stadium: Grinnell Field

1889 Midwestern college football independents records
	Conf.			Overall
Team	W	L	T	W		L		T
Miami (OH)		–		4	–	0	–	0
Butler		–		2	–	0	–	0
Washington University		–		2	–	0	–	0
Iowa College		–		1	–	0	–	0
Lake Forest		–		1	–	0	–	0
Notre Dame		–		1	–	0	–	0
South Dakota		–		1	–	0	–	1
Minnesota		–		3	–	1	–	0
Purdue		–		2	–	1	–	0
South Dakota Agricultural		–		0	–	0	–	1
Northwestern		–		2	–	2	–	0
Cincinnati		–		1	–	1	–	0
Wabash		–		1	–	1	–	0
Michigan		–		1	–	2	–	0
Indiana		–		0	–	1	–	1
Iowa		–		0	–	1	–	0
Wisconsin		–		0	–	2	–	0

The 1889 Iowa College Pioneers football team represented Iowa College during the 1889 college football season. On September 26, 1889, Martin Sampson, who would later score the first touchdown in school history, led a meeting regarding the organization of an S.U.I. football team. It was this suggestion that earned Sampson the title of coach and captain of the team. In the following days, Iowa sent out a challenge to any team in the state of Iowa for a game of football. The one team to accept Iowa's challenge: Iowa College. The Hawkeyes were no strangers to the Pioneers, as the two schools had met on the baseball diamond in the 20 years before. The game date was set for November 16, and the preparations for the game began.

Preparations were difficult at Iowa, as proper management and leadership was obviously lacking at team practices. That was hardly the case with practices at Iowa College. With the help of Frank Everest and Lou Van Giesen, two men with playing experience back east, the Pioneers were able to field a competitive team. Iowa was outmatched, and lost the game, 24–0. Although a rematch was scheduled to be played on Thanksgiving, it was canceled due to inclement weather. With that, Iowa College had won the first championship west of the Mississippi River.

== Schedule ==
Date	Opponent	Site	Result
November 16	Iowa	Grinnell Field; Grinnell, IA	W 24–0
November 28	at Iowa	Iowa Field; Iowa City, IA	Canceled
