= 1889 Cincinnati football team =

American college football season

1889 Cincinnati football
- Conference: Independent
- Record: 1–1
- Head coach: None
- Captain: Arch Carson

1889 Midwestern college football independents records
	Conf.			Overall
Team	W	L	T	W		L		T
Miami (OH)		–		4	–	0	–	0
Butler		–		2	–	0	–	0
Washington University		–		2	–	0	–	0
Iowa College		–		1	–	0	–	0
Lake Forest		–		1	–	0	–	0
Notre Dame		–		1	–	0	–	0
South Dakota		–		1	–	0	–	1
Minnesota		–		3	–	1	–	0
Purdue		–		2	–	1	–	0
South Dakota Agricultural		–		0	–	0	–	1
Northwestern		–		2	–	2	–	0
Cincinnati		–		1	–	1	–	0
Wabash		–		1	–	1	–	0
Michigan		–		1	–	2	–	0
Indiana		–		0	–	1	–	1
Iowa		–		0	–	1	–	0
Wisconsin		–		0	–	2	–	0

The 1889 Cincinnati football team was an American football team that represented the University of Cincinnati as an independent during the 1889 college football season. The team compiled a 1–1 record. Arch Carson was the team captain. The team had no head coach.

== Schedule ==
Date	Opponent	Site	Result
	Avondale	Cincinnati, OH	W 12–0
December 14	at Miami (OH)	field occupied by Old Alumni Library and Irvin Hall; Oxford, OH (rivalry)	L 0–34
