= 1889 Wisconsin Badgers football team =

American college football season

1889 Wisconsin Badgers football
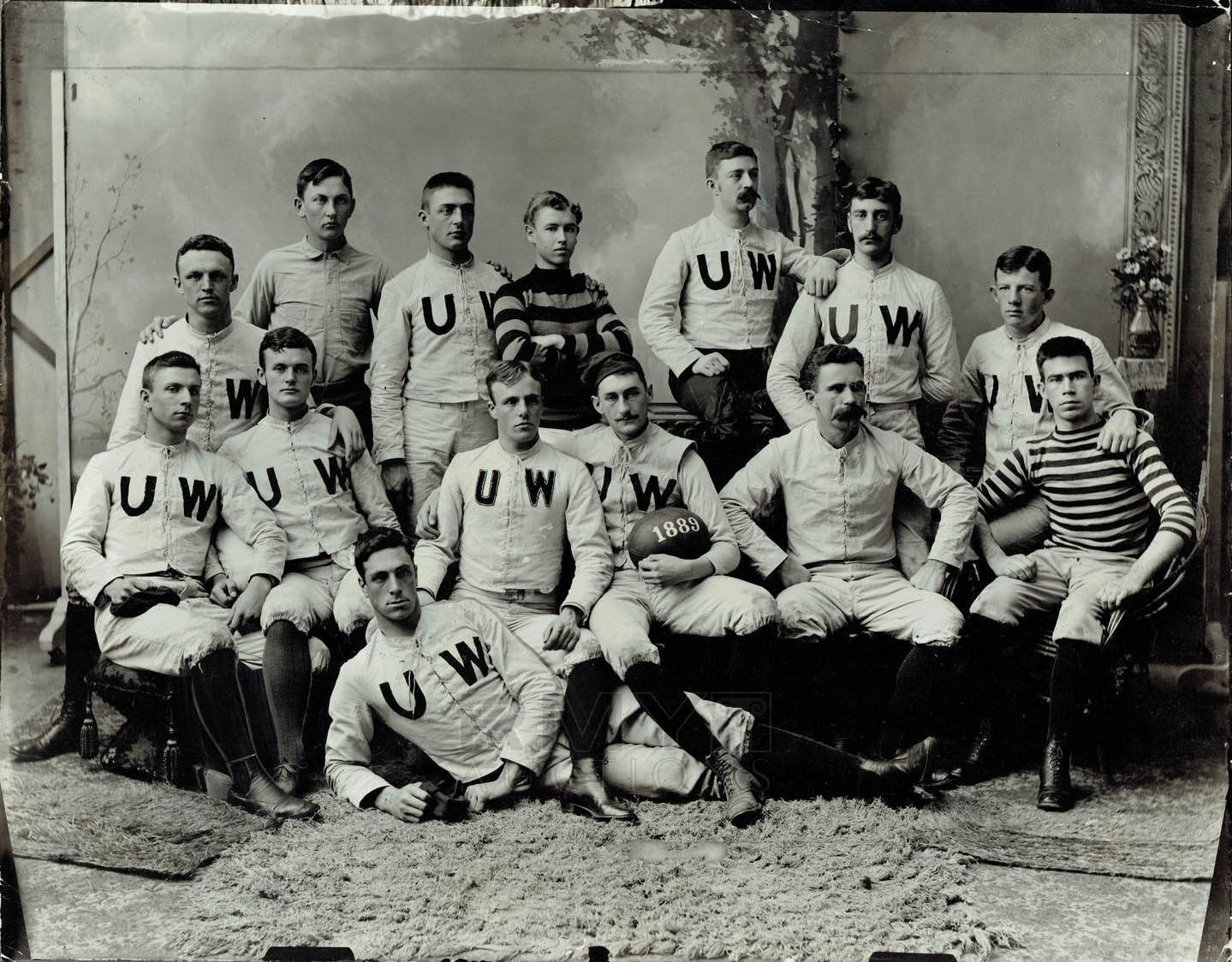
- Conference: Independent
- Record: 0–2
- Head coach: Alvin Kletsch (1st season)
- Captain: Charles Mayer
- Home stadium: Randall Field

1889 Midwestern college football independents records
	Conf.			Overall
Team	W	L	T	W		L		T
Miami (OH)		–		4	–	0	–	0
Butler		–		2	–	0	–	0
Washington University		–		2	–	0	–	0
Iowa College		–		1	–	0	–	0
Lake Forest		–		1	–	0	–	0
Notre Dame		–		1	–	0	–	0
South Dakota		–		1	–	0	–	1
Minnesota		–		3	–	1	–	0
Purdue		–		2	–	1	–	0
South Dakota Agricultural		–		0	–	0	–	1
Northwestern		–		2	–	2	–	0
Cincinnati		–		1	–	1	–	0
Wabash		–		1	–	1	–	0
Michigan		–		1	–	2	–	0
Indiana		–		0	–	1	–	1
Iowa		–		0	–	1	–	0
Wisconsin		–		0	–	2	–	0

The 1889 Wisconsin Badgers football team represented the University of Wisconsin as an independent during the 1889 college football season. Led by Alvin Kletsch in his only season as head coach, the Badgers compiled a record of 0–2. 1889 was the first season of Wisconsin Badgers football. The team's captain was Charles Mayer.

== Schedule ==
Date	Opponent	Site	Result
November 13	vs. Calumet Club	Milwaukee, WI	L 0–27
December 14	Beloit	Randall Field; Madison, WI	L 0–4
