= Shillelagh Trophy =

Shillelagh Trophy can refer to:

- The Jeweled Shillelagh awarded to the victor of the football game between the Notre Dame Fighting Irish and USC Trojans since 1952
- The Shillelagh Trophy (Northwestern–Notre Dame) awarded to the victor of the football game between the Northwestern Wildcats and Notre Dame Fighting Irish 1930–c. 1973
- The Shillelagh Trophy (Notre Dame–Purdue) awarded to the victor of the football game between Notre Dame Fighting Irish and Purdue Boilermakers since 1957
