= 1889 Butler Christians football team =

American college football season

1889 Butler Christians football
- Conference: Independent
- Record: 2–0
- Head coach: Clinton L. Hare (2nd season)
- Home stadium: Y. M. C. A. Athletic Park

1889 Midwestern college football independents records
	Conf.			Overall
Team	W	L	T	W		L		T
Miami (OH)		–		4	–	0	–	0
Butler		–		2	–	0	–	0
Washington University		–		2	–	0	–	0
Iowa College		–		1	–	0	–	0
Lake Forest		–		1	–	0	–	0
Notre Dame		–		1	–	0	–	0
South Dakota		–		1	–	0	–	1
Minnesota		–		3	–	1	–	0
Purdue		–		2	–	1	–	0
South Dakota Agricultural		–		0	–	0	–	1
Northwestern		–		2	–	2	–	0
Cincinnati		–		1	–	1	–	0
Wabash		–		1	–	1	–	0
Michigan		–		1	–	2	–	0
Indiana		–		0	–	1	–	1
Iowa		–		0	–	1	–	0
Wisconsin		–		0	–	2	–	0

The 1889 Butler Christians football team represented Butler University as an independent during the 1889 college football season. Led by Clinton L. Hare in his second and final season as head coach, Butler compiled a record of 2–0.

== Schedule ==
Date	Time	Opponent	Site	Result	Attendance	Source
November 16	2:00 p.m.	Hanover	Y. M. C. A. Athletic Park; Indianapolis, IN	W 32–0		
November 28	2:30 p.m.	Purdue	Y. M. C. A. Athletic Park; Indianapolis, IN	W 14–0	250	
