= 1889 Michigan Wolverines football team =

American college football season

1889 Michigan Wolverines football
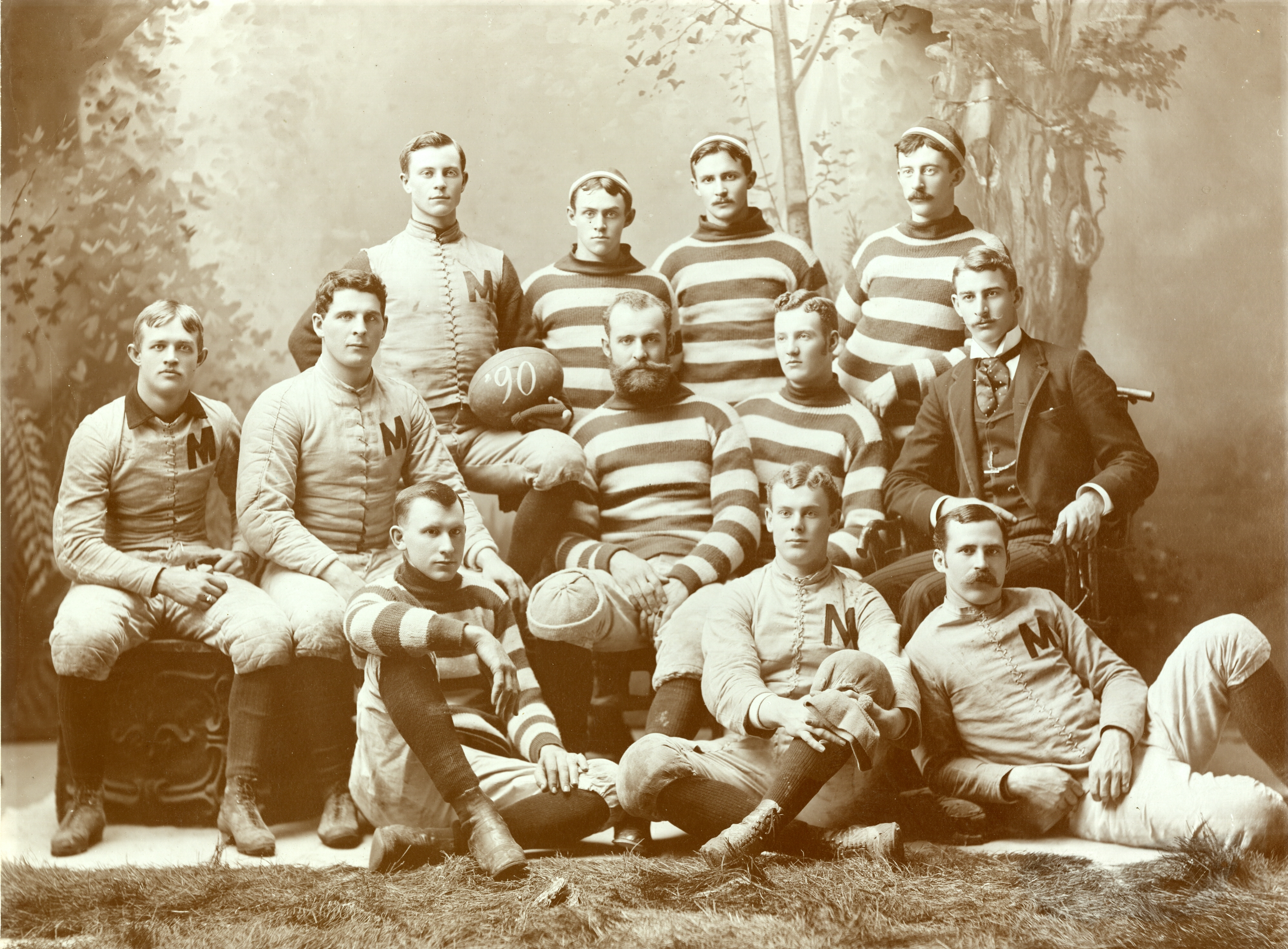
- Conference: Independent
- Record: 1–2
- Head coach: None
- Captain: Edgar W. McPherran
- Home stadium: Ann Arbor Fairgrounds

1889 Midwestern college football independents records
	Conf.			Overall
Team	W	L	T	W		L		T
Miami (OH)		–		4	–	0	–	0
Butler		–		2	–	0	–	0
Washington University		–		2	–	0	–	0
Iowa College		–		1	–	0	–	0
Lake Forest		–		1	–	0	–	0
Notre Dame		–		1	–	0	–	0
South Dakota		–		1	–	0	–	1
Minnesota		–		3	–	1	–	0
Purdue		–		2	–	1	–	0
South Dakota Agricultural		–		0	–	0	–	1
Northwestern		–		2	–	2	–	0
Cincinnati		–		1	–	1	–	0
Wabash		–		1	–	1	–	0
Michigan		–		1	–	2	–	0
Indiana		–		0	–	1	–	1
Iowa		–		0	–	1	–	0
Wisconsin		–		0	–	2	–	0

The 1889 Michigan Wolverines football team represented the University of Michigan in the 1889 college football season. The Wolverines played their home games at Ann Arbor Fairgrounds.

== Schedule ==
Date	Time	Opponent	Site	Result	Attendance	Source
November 9		Albion	Ann Arbor Fairgrounds; Ann Arbor, MI	W 33–4		
November 16	2:30 p.m.	vs. Cornell	Olympic Park; Buffalo, NY	L 0–66	2,000	
November 28		at Chicago University Club	West Side Park; Chicago, IL	L 0–20		

== Players ==
=== Varsity letter winners ===
- Howard Abbott, Minneapolis, Minnesota - quarterback
- William D. Ball, Ann Arbor, Michigan - substitute
- Benjamin J. Boutwell, Hillsdale, Michigan - center
- James E. Duffy, Ann Arbor, Michigan - left halfback
- Stephen Clifton Glidden, Glanville, Illinois - right end
- George Malcolm Hull, Ypsilanti, Michigan - left guard
- Edgar Withrow McPherran, Marquette, Michigan - right halfback
- William C. Malley, Chicago, Illinois - right tackle
- Horace Prettyman, Bryan, Ohio - left tackle
- Horace Burton Strait, Jr., Shakopee, Minnesota - left end
- John R. Sutton, Hillsdale, Michigan - substitute at left tackle
- David W. Trainer, Jr., Thurlow, Pennsylvania - right guard
- James Van Inwagen, Chicago, Illinois - fullback

=== Others ===
- Archibald Warren Diack
- Frank Burton Graves
- Harry Samuel Haines
- William W. Harless, Chicago, Illinois - rusher
- Metcalfe Bradley Hatch
- Harry Dwight Smith - quarterback
- Clark J. Sutherland, Oxford, Michigan
- Horace T. Van Deventer, Knoxville, Tennessee - substitute

== Coaching staff ==
- Coach: no coach
- Captain: Edgar W. McPherran
- Manager: Thomas L. Wilkinson
