= List of Wisconsin Badgers head football coaches =

List of head football coaches for the Wisconsin Badgers

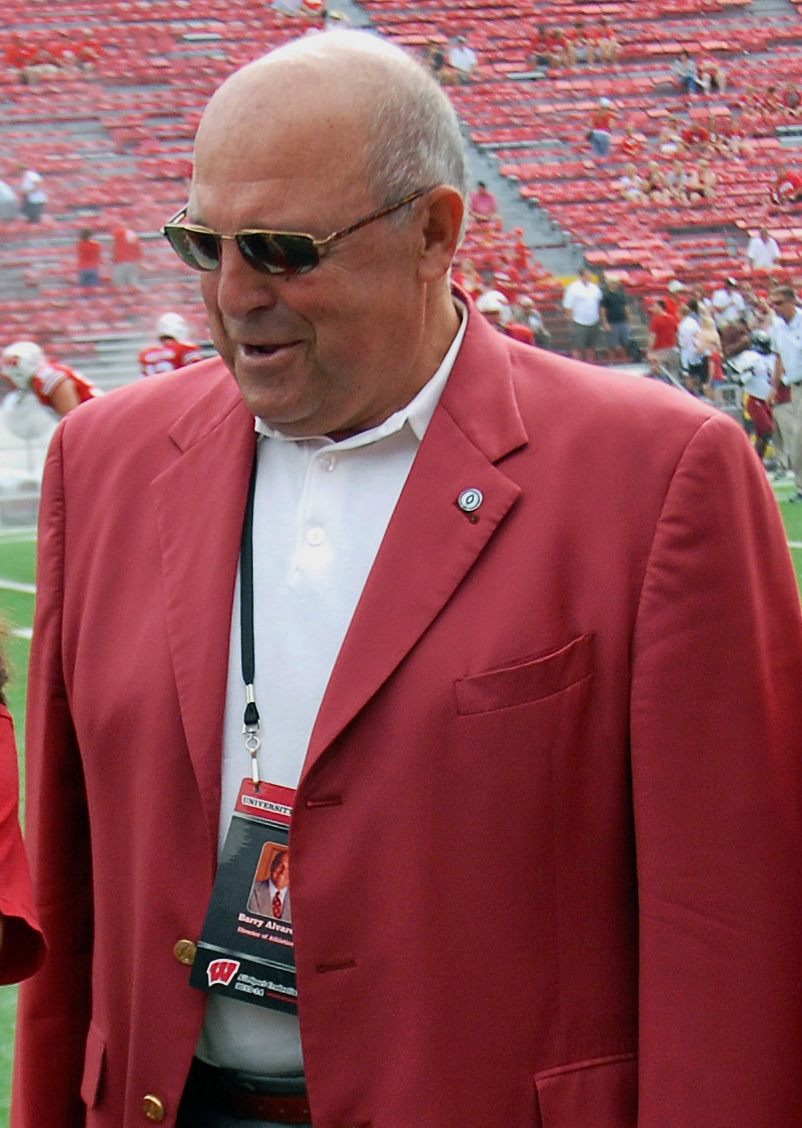
Barry Alvarez has been the head coach three times at Wisconsin, counting two times as "interim" head coach.

The Wisconsin Badgers college football team represents the University of Wisconsin–Madison in the Big Ten Conference (Big 10), as part of the NCAA Division I Football Bowl Subdivision. The program has had 30 head coaches, and 3 interim head coaches, since it began play during the 1889 season. Since November 2022, Luke Fickell has served as Wisconsin's head coach. As of the end of the 2023 season, Wisconsin has an all-time record of 742 wins, 518, losses, and 53 ties (.585 all-time winning percentage).

Eight coaches have led Wisconsin in postseason bowl games: Ivy Williamson, Milt Bruhn, Dave McClain, Barry Alvarez, Bret Bielema, Gary Andersen, Paul Chryst, and Fickell. Seven of those coaches also won conference championships: Philip King captured three, and Charles P. Hutchins and William Juneau each one, as a member of the Western Conference; Williamson captured one, Bruhn two, and both Alvarez and Bielema three as a member of the Big 10.

Alvarez is the leader in seasons coached, with 16 years as head coach and games coached (195) and won (119). King has the highest winning percentage at 0.853. Alvin Kletsch has the lowest winning percentage of those who have coached more than one game, with 0.000. Of the 33 different head coaches who have led the Badgers, King, George Little, Clarence Spears, Harry Stuhldreher, and Alvarez have been inducted into the College Football Hall of Fame.

== Key ==
Key to symbols in coaches list
General		Overall		Conference		Postseason (Note: Although the first Rose Bowl Game was played in 1902, it has been continuously played since the 1916 game, and is recognized as the oldest bowl game by the NCAA. "—" indicates any season prior to 1916 when postseason games were not played.)	
No.	Order of coaches (Note: A running total of the number of head coaches, with coaches who served separate tenures being counted only once. Interim head coaches are represented with "Int" and are not counted in the running total. "—" indicates the team played but either without a coach or no coach is on record. "X" indicates an interim year without play.)	GC	Games coached	CW	Conference wins	PW	Postseason wins
DC	Division championships	OW	Overall wins	CL	Conference losses	PL	Postseason losses
CC	Conference championships	OL	Overall losses	CT	Conference ties	PT	Postseason ties
NC	National championships	OT	Overall ties (Note: Overtime rules in college football were introduced in 1996, making ties impossible in the period since.)	C%	Conference winning percentage		
†	Elected to the College Football Hall of Fame	O%	Overall winning percentage (Note: When computing the win–loss percentage, a tie counts as half a win and half a loss.)				

== Coaches ==
List of head football coaches showing season(s) coached, overall records, conference records (Note: Wisconsin has been a member of Big Ten Conference since the 1896 season.), postseason records, championships and selected awards (Note: Statistics correct as of the end of the 2025 NCAA Division I FBS football season.)
No.	Name	Season(s)	GC	OW	OL	OT	O%	CW	CL	CT	C%	PW	PL	PT	DCs	CCs	NCs	Awards
1	Alvin Kletsch	1889	2	0	2	0	.000	—	—	—	—	—	—	—	—	—	0	—
2	Ted Mestre	1890	4	1	3	0	0.250	—	—	—	—	—	—	—	—	—	0	—
3	Herb Alward	1891	5	3	1	1	0.700	—	—	—	—	—	—	—	—	—	0	—
4	Billy Crawford (Note: National Collegiate Athletic Association (NCAA) and Wisconsin records indicate that Frank Crawford was Wisconsin's coach in 1892, but contemporary coverage shows at Billy Crawford coached Wisconsin in 1892, while Frank coached at Baker University.)	1892	7	4	3	0	0.571	2	2	0	0.500	—	—	—	—	0	0	—
5	Parke H. Davis	1893	6	4	2	0	0.667	1	1	0	0.500	—	—	—	—	0	0	—
6	Hiland Orlando Stickney	1894–1895	15	10	4	1	0.700	—	—	—	—	—	—	—	—	—	0	—
7	Philip King^{†}	1896–1902; 1905	78	66	11	1	0.853	17	8	1	0.673	—	—	—	—	3	0	—
8	Arthur Hale Curtis	1903–1904	18	11	6	1	0.639	0	6	1	0.071	—	—	—	—	0	0	—
9	Charles P. Hutchins	1906–1907	10	8	1	1	0.850	6	1	1	0.813	—	—	—	—	1	0	—
10	Thomas A. Barry	1908–1910	16	9	4	3	0.656	5	4	2	0.545	—	—	—	—	0	0	—
11	John R. Richards	1911; 1917; 1919–1922	42	29	9	4	0.738	14	7	3	0.646	—	—	—	—	0	0	—
12	William Juneau	1912–1915	28	18	8	2	0.679	10	7	2	0.579	—	—	—	—	1	0	—
13	Paul Withington	1916	7	4	2	1	0.643	1	2	1	0.375	—	—	—	—	0	0	—
14	Guy Lowman	1918	6	3	3	0	0.500	1	2	0	0.333	—	—	—	—	0	0	—
15	John J. Ryan	1923–1924	15	5	6	4	0.467	1	5	3	0.278	—	—	—	—	0	0	—
16	George Little^{†}	1925–1926	16	11	3	2	0.750	6	3	2	0.636	—	—	—	—	0	0	—
17	Glenn Thistlethwaite	1927–1931	45	26	16	3	0.611	10	14	2	0.423	—	—	—	—	0	0	—
18	Clarence Spears^{†}	1932–1935	32	13	17	2	0.438	7	13	2	0.364	—	—	—	—	0	0	—
19	Harry Stuhldreher^{†}	1936–1948	113	45	62	6	0.425	26	45	4	0.373	—	—	—	—	0	0	—
20	Ivy Williamson	1949–1955	64	41	19	4	0.672	29	13	4	0.674	0	1	0	—	1	0	—
21	Milt Bruhn	1956–1966	103	53	45	6	0.534	35	37	5	0.487	0	2	0	—	2	0	—
22	John Coatta	1967–1969	30	3	26	1	0.117	3	17	1	0.167	0	0	0	—	0	0	—
23	John Jardine	1970–1977	87	37	47	3	0.443	25	38	1	0.398	0	0	0	—	0	0	—
24	Dave McClain	1978–1985	91	46	42	3	0.522	32	34	3	0.486	1	2	0	—	0	0	—
Int	Jim Hilles	1986	12	3	9	0	0.250	2	6	0	0.250	0	0	0	—	0	0	—
25	Don Morton	1987–1989	33	6	27	0	0.182	3	21	0	0.125	0	0	0	—	0	0	—
26	Barry Alvarez^{†}	1990–2005; 2012 (Note: Alvarez served as interim head coach for the 2013 Rose Bowl after the resignation of Bret Bielema.); 2014 (Note: Alvarez served as interim head coach for the 2015 Outback Bowl after the resignation of Gary Andersen.)	195	119	72	4	0.621	65	60	3	0.520	9	4	0	—	3	0	—
27	Bret Bielema	2006–2012	92	68	24	—	0.739	37	19	—	0.661	2	4	—	2	3	0	—
28	Gary Andersen	2013–2014	26	19	7	—	0.731	13	3	—	0.813	0	1	—	1	0	0	—
29	Paul Chryst	2015–2022	93	67	26	—	0.720	43	18	—	0.705	6	1	—	3	0	0	—
Int	Jim Leonhard (Note: Leonhard served as interim head coach for the final seven regular season games in 2022 after Paul Chryst was fired.)	2022	7	4	3	—	0.571	4	3	—	0.571	0	0	—	0	0	0	—
30	Luke Fickell	2022–present	38	17	21	—	0.447	10	17	—	0.370	1	1	—	0	0	0	—
