= C. Sherman King =

American football coach

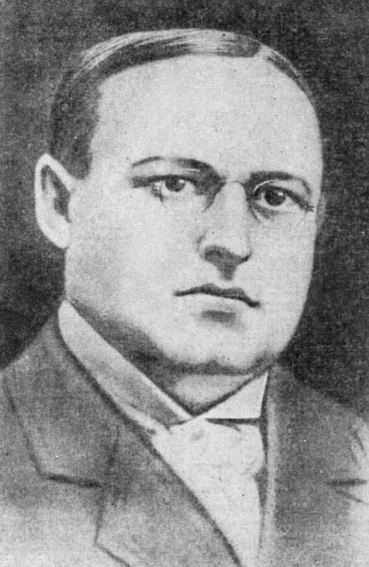
- King pictured in the Chicago Tribune, 1908

Biographical details
- Born: September 14, 1865; Wabash, Indiana, U.S.
- Died: July 18, 1908 (aged 42); Columbia City, Indiana, U.S.
- Education: Yale (1889)

Coaching career (HC unless noted)
- 1889: Wabash

Head coaching record
- Overall: 1–1

Charles Sherman King (September 14, 1865 – July 18, 1908) was an American college football coach. He served as the fourth head football coach at Wabash College in Crawfordsville, Indiana, and he held that position for the 1889 season. His record at Wabash was 1–1. King was killed, along with wife and two daughters, on July 18, 1908, when a train stuck their automobile near Columbia City, Indiana.

== Head coaching record ==
Year	Team	Overall	Conference	Standing	Bowl/playoffs
Wabash (Independent) (1889)
1889	Wabash	1–1			
Wabash:		1–1			
Total:		1–1			
