= William K. Martin =

American football and baseball coach (1867–1949)

Biographical details
- Born: 1867
- Died: July 10, 1949 (aged 81); Crawfordsville, Indiana, U.S.

Playing career

Football
- 1886: Wabash
- Position: Quarterback

Coaching career (HC unless noted)

Football
- 1887: Wabash

Baseball
- 1889–1892: Wabash

Head coaching record
- Overall: 0–1 (football); 19–10 (baseball)

William K. "Uncle Billy" Martin (1867 – July 10, 1949) was an American college football and college baseball coach. He was the third head football coach at Wabash College in Crawfordsville, Indiana, serving for one season, in 1887 season, and compiling a record of 0–1. Martin was also the head baseball coach at Wabash from 1889 to 1892, tallying a mark of 19–10. Martin died on July 10, 1949, at his home in Crawfordsville.

== Head coaching record ==
=== Football ===
Year	Team	Overall	Conference	Standing	Bowl/playoffs
Wabash (Independent) (1887)
1887	Wabash	0–1			
Wabash:		0–1			
Total:		0–1			
