= 1889 Iowa Hawkeyes football team =

American college football season

1889 Iowa Hawkeyes football
- Conference: Independent
- Record: 0–1
- Head coach: None
- Captain: Martin Sampson
- Home stadium: Iowa Field

1889 Midwestern college football independents records
| | Conf. | | | Overall |
| Team | W | L | T | W | | L | | T |
|---|---|---|---|---|---|---|---|---|
| Miami (OH) | | – | | 4 | – | 0 | – | 0 |
| Butler | | – | | 2 | – | 0 | – | 0 |
| Washington University | | – | | 2 | – | 0 | – | 0 |
| Iowa College | | – | | 1 | – | 0 | – | 0 |
| Lake Forest | | – | | 1 | – | 0 | – | 0 |
| Notre Dame | | – | | 1 | – | 0 | – | 0 |
| South Dakota | | – | | 1 | – | 0 | – | 1 |
| Minnesota | | – | | 3 | – | 1 | – | 0 |
| Purdue | | – | | 2 | – | 1 | – | 0 |
| South Dakota Agricultural | | – | | 0 | – | 0 | – | 1 |
| Northwestern | | – | | 2 | – | 2 | – | 0 |
| Cincinnati | | – | | 1 | – | 1 | – | 0 |
| Wabash | | – | | 1 | – | 1 | – | 0 |
| Michigan | | – | | 1 | – | 2 | – | 0 |
| Indiana | | – | | 0 | – | 1 | – | 1 |
| Iowa | | – | | 0 | – | 1 | – | 0 |
| Wisconsin | | – | | 0 | – | 2 | – | 0 |

The 1889 Iowa Hawkeyes football team represented the State University of Iowa ("S.U.I."), now commonly known as the University of Iowa, during the 1889 college football season. On September 26, 1889, Martin Sampson, who would later score the first touchdown in school history, led a meeting regarding the organization of an S.U.I. football team. It was this suggestion that earned Sampson the title of coach and captain of the team. In the following days, Iowa sent out a challenge to any team in the state of Iowa for a game of football. The one team to accept Iowa's challenge: Iowa College. The Hawkeyes were no strangers to the Pioneers, as the two schools had met on the baseball diamond in the 20 years before. The game date was set for November 16, and the preparations for the game began.

Preparations were difficult at Iowa, as proper management and leadership was obviously lacking at team practices. That was hardly the case with practices at Iowa College. With the help of Frank Everest and Lou Van Giesen, two men with playing experience back east, the Hawkeyes were able to field a team. Iowa was outmatched, and lost the game, 24–0. Although a rematch was scheduled to be played on Thanksgiving, it was canceled due to inclement weather. With that, Iowa College had won the first championship west of the Mississippi River.

Halfback Martin Sampson was the team captain.

== Schedule ==
| Date | Opponent | Site | Result |
|---|---|---|---|
| November 16 | at Iowa College | Grinnell Field; Grinnell, IA | L 0–24 |
| November 28 | Iowa College | Iowa City, IA | Canceled |

== Players ==
- Preston Coast
- Arthur Cox
- Lloyd Elliott
- Andrew Gorrell
- Edward Lewis
- Frank Pierce
- Milton Powers
- Martin Sampson, halfback and captain
- Allen Sanford
- Arthur Smith
