= 1889 Minnesota Golden Gophers football team =

American college football season

1889 Minnesota Golden Gophers football
- Conference: Independent
- Record: 3–1
- Head coach: Al McCord (1st season); D. W. McCord; Frank Heffelfinger, Billy Morse
- Captain: Alfred Pillsbury

1889 Midwestern college football independents records
	Conf.			Overall
Team	W	L	T	W		L		T
Miami (OH)		–		4	–	0	–	0
Butler		–		2	–	0	–	0
Washington University		–		2	–	0	–	0
Iowa College		–		1	–	0	–	0
Lake Forest		–		1	–	0	–	0
Notre Dame		–		1	–	0	–	0
South Dakota		–		1	–	0	–	1
Minnesota		–		3	–	1	–	0
Purdue		–		2	–	1	–	0
South Dakota Agricultural		–		0	–	0	–	1
Northwestern		–		2	–	2	–	0
Cincinnati		–		1	–	1	–	0
Wabash		–		1	–	1	–	0
Michigan		–		1	–	2	–	0
Indiana		–		0	–	1	–	1
Iowa		–		0	–	1	–	0
Wisconsin		–		0	–	2	–	0

The 1889 Minnesota Golden Gophers football team represented the University of Minnesota as an independent during the 1889 college football season. This was the only season to feature game coaches.

== Before the season ==
After Frederick S. Jones stopped actively coaching, the team used game coaches for one season instead of finding a replacement for him. The McCords, like Coach Peebles, had played football at Princeton.

1889 finally saw the formation of a football association. Before 1889, there wasn't any kind of official connection between the football team and the student body, which sometimes resulted in player shortages and required recruitment from other schools in order to have enough men to play in the games.

Once again, an attempt was made to schedule a game with the University of Michigan, but "Michigan wanted Minnesota to pay all of the expenses of the trip, which would amount to two hundred dollars. The Minnesota management was not able to see its way clear to guarantee this and so the game was given up."

Team of 1889: Quarterback, Alf F. Pillsbury (captain); Halfbacks, George K. Belden, John F. Hayden; Fullback, Grant Rossman; Rush Line, Birney E. Trask (l.e.), A.J. Harris (l.t.), R.B. Brower (l.g.), E.H. Day (r.e.), J.E. Madigan (r.t.), George C. Sikes (r.g.), H.R. Robinson (center); Substitutes, M.B. Davidson, Charles E. Guthrie and W.M. Thompson.

== Schedule ==
Date	Opponent	Site	Result
October 5	Ex-Collegiates	Minneapolis, MN	W 2–0
October 26	Ex-Collegiates	Minneapolis, MN	W 10–0
November 11	at Shattuck	Faribault, MN	L 8–28
November 20	Shattuck	Minneapolis, MN	W 26–0
