= Grinnell Pioneers football =

College football program of Grinnell College

- First season: 1889; 137 years ago
- Head coach: Brent Barnes; 5th season, 8–30 (.211)
- Stadium: Rosenbloom Field
- Conference: MWC
- Colors: Black and scarlet
- Website: pioneers.grinnell.edu/football

The Grinnell Pioneers football team represents Grinnell College in collegiate-level football. The team competes in the NCAA Division III as a member of the Midwest Conference.

== History ==
On a blustery November afternoon in 1889, Grinnell College beat the University of Iowa 24–0 in the first intercollegiate football game west of the Mississippi River. A stone marker still stands in Grinnell Field marking the event. The team's first head coach was Theron Lyman. It was a member of the Missouri Valley Intercollegiate Athletic Association from 1918 to 1927 and its successor the Missouri Valley Conference from 1928 to 1939.

After starting 2019 at 0–3 and with only 28 of 39 healthy players, the team withdrew from competitive play and forfeited its remaining seven games of the season on October 1 in order to protect the health and safety of its student-athletes. The players had voted overwhelmingly to end the season as a protest over their perceived lack of support by the administration, which the team believed caused them to be undermanned over the past four seasons.

On September 30, 2023, Juniper Schwartzman became the first woman to play, and to score, for the team, kicking an extra point in a game the team won against Lawrence University.
