= Howard Abbott =

American football player, lawyer, and judge (1867–1939)

- Photograph of Abbott from "Notable Men of the West" (1902)
- Born: February 11, 1867; Washington, D.C., U.S.
- Died: October 5, 1939 (aged 72); Rochester, Minnesota, U.S.
- Education: University of Minnesota, University of Michigan
- Known for: Football player/Judge

Howard T. Abbott (February 11, 1867 – October 5, 1939) was an American football player, lawyer and judge. He played college football and was the starting quarterback for both the University of Minnesota in 1886 and the University of Michigan in 1889. He was also the captain of the first Minnesota Golden Gophers football team in 1886. He was a lawyer in Duluth, Minnesota, starting in 1891 and later became a judge.

== Early life ==
Abbott was born in Washington, D.C. in 1867, the son of Asa T. and Fannie B. (Cross) Abbott. Starting at age eight, Abbott attended Army schools, as his father was serving in the military. In 1879, he moved with his family to Minneapolis where he attended public schools.

== College career ==
Howard Abbott
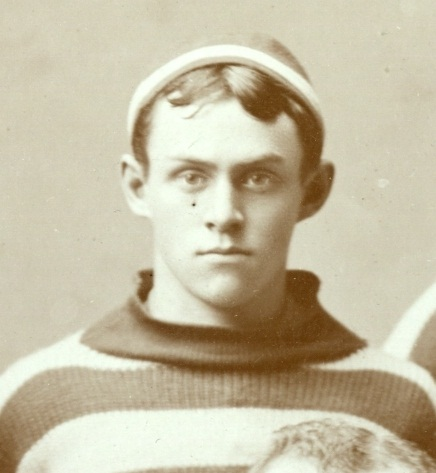

Profile
- Position: Quarterback

Career information
- College: Minnesota (1886–1888); Michigan (1889–1890)

=== Minnesota ===
In 1886, Abbott enrolled at the University of Minnesota where he studied for three years. While he was a student at Minnesota, he was the captain and quarterback of the first Minnesota Golden Gophers football team in 1886.

=== Michigan ===
In 1889, Abbott enrolled at the University of Michigan as a law student. While studying law, he was the starting quarterback for the 1889 Michigan Wolverines football team. The 1889 team led by Abbott finished with a 1–2 record and was outscored 76–0 by Cornell and the Chicago University Club. He was also a reserve quarterback on the 1890 team.

== Legal career and personal life ==
After receiving a Bachelor of Laws degree in 1890, Abbott moved to Duluth, Minnesota, where he began practicing law in 1891. In November 1895, he married Gertrude P. Markell, and they had two children. He was a member of the firm of Abbott, McPherran, Lewis and Gilbert. He later served as a judge. In 1935, Judge Abbott was honored as a pioneer of Gopher sports in a reunion held at the Minnesota Union on the 50th anniversary of the first football team.

=== Death ===
In October 1939, Abbott died at Rochester, Minnesota from coronary thrombosis. He had come to the Mayo Clinic three weeks earlier and died at Worrell Hospital.
