= 1889 Purdue football team =

American college football season

1889 Purdue football
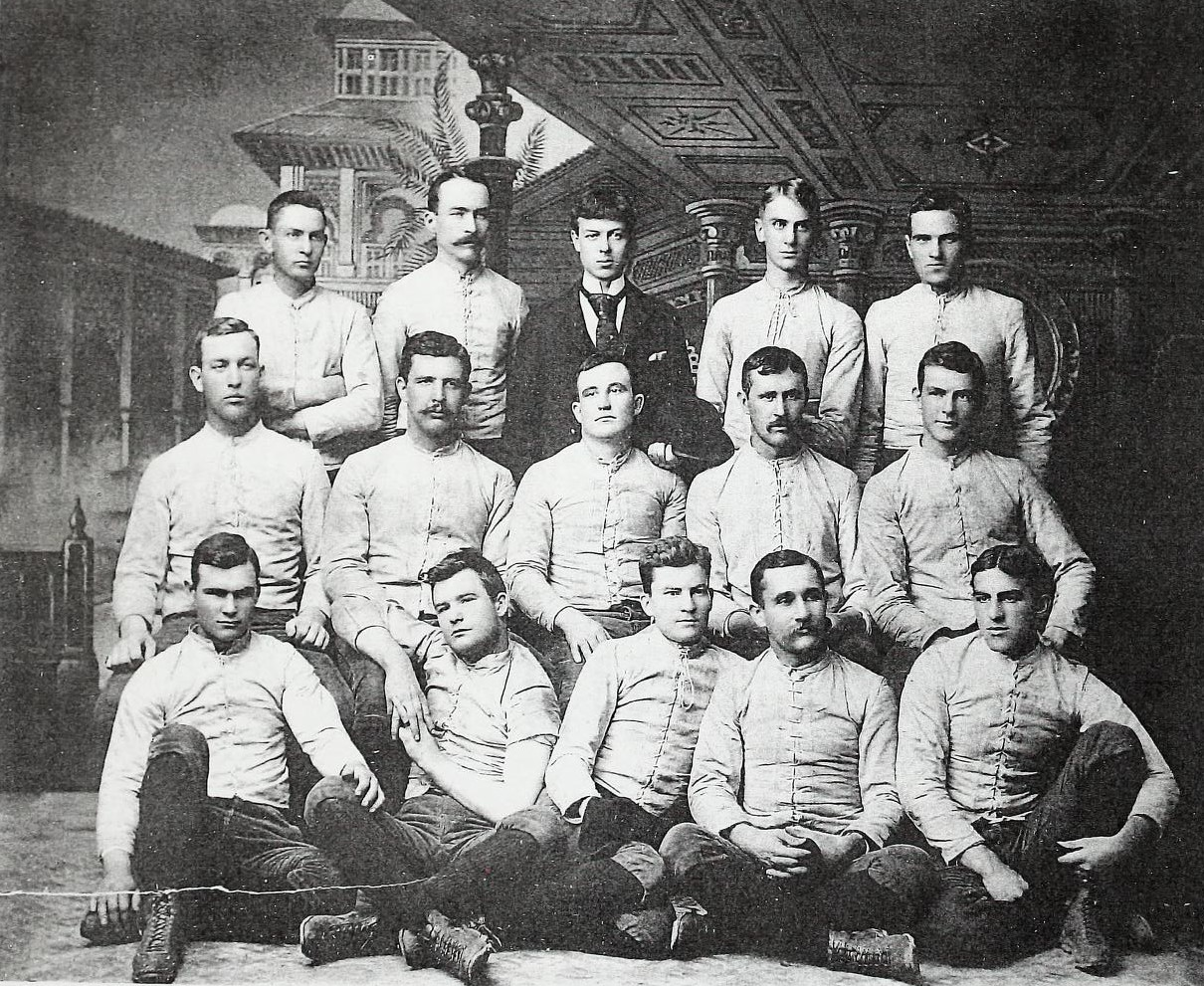
- Conference: Independent
- Record: 2–1
- Head coach: George Andrew Reisner (1st season)
- Captain: J. M. Sholl

1889 Midwestern college football independents records
| | Conf. | | | Overall |
| Team | W | L | T | W | | L | | T |
|---|---|---|---|---|---|---|---|---|
| Miami (OH) | | – | | 4 | – | 0 | – | 0 |
| Butler | | – | | 2 | – | 0 | – | 0 |
| Washington University | | – | | 2 | – | 0 | – | 0 |
| Iowa College | | – | | 1 | – | 0 | – | 0 |
| Lake Forest | | – | | 1 | – | 0 | – | 0 |
| Notre Dame | | – | | 1 | – | 0 | – | 0 |
| South Dakota | | – | | 1 | – | 0 | – | 1 |
| Minnesota | | – | | 3 | – | 1 | – | 0 |
| Purdue | | – | | 2 | – | 1 | – | 0 |
| South Dakota Agricultural | | – | | 0 | – | 0 | – | 1 |
| Northwestern | | – | | 2 | – | 2 | – | 0 |
| Cincinnati | | – | | 1 | – | 1 | – | 0 |
| Wabash | | – | | 1 | – | 1 | – | 0 |
| Michigan | | – | | 1 | – | 2 | – | 0 |
| Indiana | | – | | 0 | – | 1 | – | 1 |
| Iowa | | – | | 0 | – | 1 | – | 0 |
| Wisconsin | | – | | 0 | – | 2 | – | 0 |

The 1889 Purdue football team was an American football team that represented Purdue University as an independent during the 1889 college football season. The team compiled a 2–1 record in the university's second season fielding an intercollegiate football team. Archaeologist and Harvard alumnus, George Andrew Reisner, was the team's coach. The team opened its season on November 16 with a 34–10 victory over DePauw for the first victory in Purdue football history and the first game played in Lafayette, Indiana. Purdue defeated Wabash the following week, 18–4, and concluded its season on November 29 with a 14–0 loss against Butler. J. M. Sholl was the team captain.

== Schedule ==
| Date | Time | Opponent | Site | Result | Attendance | Source |
|---|---|---|---|---|---|---|
| November 16 | 3:00 p.m | DePauw | Baseball park; Lafayette, IN | W 34–10 | | |
| November 23 | 2:15 p.m. | at Wabash | Crawfordsville, IN | W 18–4 | | |
| November 28 | 2:30 p.m. | at Butler | Y. M. C. A. Athletic Park; Indianapolis, IN | L 0–14 | 250 | |

== Roster ==
- Charles Gough
- Orion Wagoner
- Paul Julian
- Archibald Stevenson
- Art Herkless
- Dumont Lotz
- F. U. Burke
- Henry Luke Bolley
- Bob Lackey
- J. M. Sholl
- Charles Olds
- Francis Hougham
- Frank Riggs
- Little
