= Edwin R. Taber =

American football coach

Biographical details
- Born: 1863; Cass County, Indiana, U.S.
- Died: February 16, 1916; North Yakima, Washington, U.S.
- Education: Wabash (1885)

Coaching career (HC unless noted)
- 1884: Wabash

Head coaching record
- Overall: 1–0

Edwin R. Taber (1863 – February 16, 1916) was an American college football coach. He was the first head football coach at Wabash College in Crawfordsville, Indiana, serving for one season, in 1884 season, and compiling a record of 1–0.

Taber was a student-coach of the team. The one game he coached was played on October 25, 1884, against Butler University at the Indianapolis Baseball Park. Wabash won the game 4–0 and completed the first intercollegiate football game in the history of the state of Indiana.

== Head coaching record ==
| Year | Team | Overall | Conference | Standing | Bowl/playoffs |
|---|---|---|---|---|---|
Wabash (Independent) (1884)
| 1884 | Wabash | 1–0 | | | |
| Wabash: | | 1–0 | | | |
| Total: | | 1–0 | | | |
