= 1889 Indiana Hoosiers football team =

American college football season

1889 Indiana Hoosiers football
- Conference: Independent
- Record: 0–1–1
- Head coach: Evans Woollen (1st season)
- Captain: Joseph Yakey

1889 Midwestern college football independents records
| | Conf. | | | Overall |
| Team | W | L | T | W | | L | | T |
|---|---|---|---|---|---|---|---|---|
| Miami (OH) | | – | | 4 | – | 0 | – | 0 |
| Butler | | – | | 2 | – | 0 | – | 0 |
| Washington University | | – | | 2 | – | 0 | – | 0 |
| Iowa College | | – | | 1 | – | 0 | – | 0 |
| Lake Forest | | – | | 1 | – | 0 | – | 0 |
| Notre Dame | | – | | 1 | – | 0 | – | 0 |
| South Dakota | | – | | 1 | – | 0 | – | 1 |
| Minnesota | | – | | 3 | – | 1 | – | 0 |
| Purdue | | – | | 2 | – | 1 | – | 0 |
| South Dakota Agricultural | | – | | 0 | – | 0 | – | 1 |
| Northwestern | | – | | 2 | – | 2 | – | 0 |
| Cincinnati | | – | | 1 | – | 1 | – | 0 |
| Wabash | | – | | 1 | – | 1 | – | 0 |
| Michigan | | – | | 1 | – | 2 | – | 0 |
| Indiana | | – | | 0 | – | 1 | – | 1 |
| Iowa | | – | | 0 | – | 1 | – | 0 |
| Wisconsin | | – | | 0 | – | 2 | – | 0 |

The 1889 Indiana Hoosiers football team was an American football team that represented Indiana University Bloomington during the 1889 college football season. In Indiana's third season of intercollegiate football, Evans Woollen, a 24-year-old Yale University graduate, served as the school's football coach. Indiana played only two games, a 6–6 tie with DePauw and a 40–4 loss to Wabash.

== Schedule ==
| Date | Time | Opponent | Site | Result | Source |
|---|---|---|---|---|---|
| November 16 | 2:00 p.m. | Wabash | Bloomington, IN | L 4–40 | |
| November 23 | | at DePauw | Greencastle, IN | T 6–6 | |

== Personnel ==
=== Roster ===
| Name | Pos. |
|---|---|
| Frank Post | |
| William Yakey | |
| Maurice Higgins | |
| William J. Boland | |
| Maurice G. Moore | |
| L. Martin | |
| C. Beard | |
| W. E. Jenkins | |
| J. C. Capron | |
| J. F. Newsome | |
| Albert Gifford | |
| W. Murphy | |
| William H. Bloss | |
