= Alvin Kletsch =

American football coach

Alvin Paul Kletsch
Biographical details
- Born: August 21, 1861; Newburg, Wisconsin, U.S.
- Died: October 3, 1941 (aged 80); Milwaukee, Wisconsin, U.S.

Coaching career (HC unless noted)
- 1889: Wisconsin

Head coaching record
- Overall: 0–2

Alvin Paul Kletsch (August 21, 1861 – October 3, 1941) was an American college football coach. He was the first head football coach at the University of Wisconsin–Madison, serving for a single season in 1889. A member of the Milwaukee County Park commission since 1907, a park on the Milwaukee River is named after him. He was a member of the Republican Party and was state chairman of the Hoover–Curtis presidential campaign in 1932. Kletsch worked in real estate and his family was well known in the hotel industry.

== Head coaching record ==
Year	Team	Overall	Conference	Standing	Bowl/playoffs
Wisconsin Badgers (Independent) (1889)
1889	Wisconsin	0–2			
Wisconsin:		0–2			
Total:		0–2			
