= Northwestern–Notre Dame football rivalry =

American college football rivalry

- Northwestern Wildcats Notre Dame Fighting Irish
- First meeting: November 14, 1889; Notre Dame 9, Northwestern 0
- Latest meeting: November 3, 2018 #3 Notre Dame 31, Northwestern 21
- Next meeting: TBD

Statistics
- Total meetings: 49
- All-time series: Notre Dame leads, 38–9–2
- Largest victory: Notre Dame, 48–0 (1976)
- Longest win streak: Notre Dame, 14 (1965–1994)
- Current win streak: Notre Dame, 1 (2018)

Locations of Northwestern and Notre Dame

The Northwestern–Notre Dame football rivalry is an American college football rivalry between the Northwestern Wildcats and Notre Dame Fighting Irish.

== History ==
Starting in the 1920s, Northwestern and Notre Dame played for a Shillelagh until the mid-1970s. The trophy game was created at the behest of Notre Dame head coach Knute Rockne, who wanted a rivalry in the Chicago metropolitan area to help build Notre Dame's fanbase there. The November 22, 1924 in thegame was the first college football game ever played at Soldier Field.

The game decided the national championship in 1930, and Notre Dame victories cost Northwestern national championships in 1926 and 1936. The two schools stopped playing regularly in the 1970s, though the rivalry was renewed from 1992 to 1995. When Northwestern stunned No. 8 Notre Dame 17–15 as a 28-point underdog in 1995, the Chicago Sun-Times billed it as the "Upset of the Century."

In 2014, the rivalry was renewed in a two-game series, with Northwestern winning 43–40 in overtime in South Bend. It gave Northwestern only their second winning streak against the Irish since they won four straight from 1959 to 1962. Notre Dame traveled to Evanston in November 2018 for their first encounter on the Wildcats' home turf since 1976. The Fighting Irish got their revenge for the Wildcats overtime upset in South Bend four years prior, winning 31–21 at Ryan Field. Notre Dame leads the series 38–9–2.

== Game results ==
Northwestern victories	Notre Dame victories	Tie games

No.	Date	Location	Winning team		Losing team	
1	November 14, 1889	Evanston, IL	Notre Dame	9	Northwestern	0
2	October 28, 1899	South Bend, IN	Notre Dame	12	Northwestern	0
3	October 12, 1901	Evanston, IL	Northwestern	2	Notre Dame	0
4	November 14, 1903	Chicago, IL	Tie	0	Tie	0
5	November 20, 1920	Evanston, IL	Notre Dame	33	Northwestern	7
6	November 22, 1924	Chicago, IL	Notre Dame	13	Northwestern	6
7	November 21, 1925	South Bend, IN	Notre Dame	13	Northwestern	10
8	October 23, 1926	Evanston, IL	Notre Dame	6	Northwestern	0
9	November 23, 1929	Evanston, IL	Notre Dame	26	Northwestern	6
10	November 22, 1930	Evanston, IL	Notre Dame	14	Northwestern	0
11	October 10, 1931	Evanston, IL	Tie	0	Tie	0
12	November 12, 1932	Evanston, IL	Notre Dame	21	Northwestern	0
13	November 18, 1933	Evanston, IL	Notre Dame	7	Northwestern	0
14	November 17, 1934	Evanston, IL	Notre Dame	20	Northwestern	7
15	November 9, 1935	South Bend, IN	Northwestern	14	Notre Dame	7
16	November 21, 1936	South Bend, IN	#11 Notre Dame	26	Northwestern	6
17	November 20, 1937	Evanston, IL	#12 Notre Dame	7	Northwestern	0
18	November 19, 1938	Evanston, IL	#1 Notre Dame	9	Northwestern	7
19	November 18, 1939	South Bend, IN	#9 Notre Dame	7	Northwestern	0
20	November 23, 1940	Evanston, IL	#10 Northwestern	20	Notre Dame	0
21	November 15, 1941	Evanston, IL	#5 Notre Dame	7	Northwestern	6
22	November 21, 1942	South Bend, IN	#8 Notre Dame	27	Northwestern	20
23	November 13, 1943	Evanston, IL	#1 Notre Dame	25	#8 Northwestern	6
24	November 18, 1944	South Bend, IN	#11 Notre Dame	21	Northwestern	0
25	November 17, 1945	Evanston, IL	#7 Notre Dame	34	Northwestern	7

No.	Date	Location	Winning team		Losing team	
26	November 16, 1946	South Bend, IN	#2 Notre Dame	27	Northwestern	0
27	November 15, 1947	Evanston, IL	#1 Notre Dame	26	Northwestern	19
28	November 13, 1948	South Bend, IN	#2 Notre Dame	12	#8 Northwestern	7
29	October 24, 1959	South Bend, IN	#2 Northwestern	30	Notre Dame	24
30	October 22, 1960	Evanston, IL	Northwestern	7	Notre Dame	6
31	October 28, 1961	South Bend, IN	Northwestern	12	#8 Notre Dame	10
32	October 27, 1962	Evanston, IL	#3 Northwestern	35	Notre Dame	6
33	October 2, 1965	South Bend, IN	#8 Notre Dame	38	Northwestern	7
34	October 1, 1966	Evanston, IL	#4 Notre Dame	35	Northwestern	7
35	October 12, 1968	South Bend, IN	#5 Notre Dame	27	Northwestern	7
36	September 20, 1969	South Bend, IN	#11 Notre Dame	35	Northwestern	10
37	September 19, 1970	Evanston, IL	#6 Notre Dame	35	Northwestern	14
38	September 18, 1971	South Bend, IN	#2 Notre Dame	50	Northwestern	7
39	September 23, 1972	Evanston, IL	#13 Notre Dame	37	Northwestern	0
40	September 22, 1973	South Bend, IN	#8 Notre Dame	44	Northwestern	0
41	September 21, 1974	Evanston, IL	#1 Notre Dame	49	Northwestern	3
42	September 27, 1975	South Bend, IN	#7 Notre Dame	31	Northwestern	7
43	September 25, 1976	Evanston, IL	Notre Dame	48	Northwestern	0
44	September 5, 1992	Chicago, IL	#3 Notre Dame	42	Northwestern	7
45	September 4, 1993	South Bend, IN	#7 Notre Dame	27	Northwestern	12
46	September 3, 1994	Chicago, IL	#3 Notre Dame	42	Northwestern	15
47	September 2, 1995	South Bend, IN	Northwestern	17	#8 Notre Dame	15
48	November 15, 2014	South Bend, IN	Northwestern	43	#18 Notre Dame	40^{OT}
49	November 3, 2018	Evanston, IL	#4 Notre Dame	31	Northwestern	21
Series: Notre Dame leads 38–9–2

== See also ==
- List of NCAA college football rivalry games
