= Wabash College =

Men's college in Crawfordsville, Indiana, US

- Latin: Collegii Wabashensis
- Former names: The Wabash Teachers Seminary and Manual Labor College (1832–1851)
- Motto: Scientiae et Virtuti (Latin)
- Motto in English: For Knowledge and Virtue
- Type: Private liberal arts men's college
- Established: November 21, 1832; 193 years ago
- Academic affiliations: NAICU; CIC; Annapolis Group; Oberlin Group; CLAC; GLCA
- Endowment: $465 million (2025)
- President: Scott E. Feller
- Faculty: 96 full-time and 7 part-time
- Undergraduates: 835
- Location: Crawfordsville, Indiana, U.S. 40°2′17″N 86°54′18″W
- Campus: Suburban, 65 acres (26 ha)
- Newspaper: The Bachelor
- Colors: Wabash Scarlet
- Nickname: Little Giants
- Sporting affiliations: NCAA Division III – NCAC
- Mascot: Wally Wabash
- Website: wabash.edu
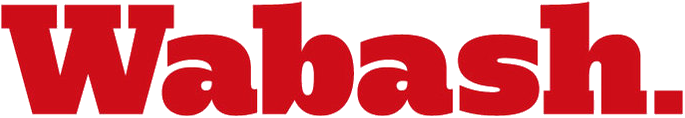

Wabash College is a private, men's liberal arts college in Crawfordsville, Indiana, United States. Founded in 1832 by a group of Dartmouth College graduates and Midwestern leaders, the institution was originally named "The Wabash Teachers Seminary and Manual Labor College". It was later renamed Wabash College in 1851. The college was founded with the intention of providing classical and English education to young men in the region, aiming to develop future educators and clergy.

As of 2024, Wabash College enrolled approximately 835 undergraduate students. The academic program is structured into three divisions: natural sciences, humanities and arts, and social sciences. Students can choose from 36 majors and minors, with popular fields of study including rhetoric, economics, history, and biology. A distinctive feature of the Wabash curriculum is the comprehensive examination process for seniors, which includes both written and oral components to assess students' mastery in their major disciplines.

Wabash College is one of only three non-religious, all-male, four-year colleges remaining in the United States, alongside Hampden–Sydney College and Morehouse College. The college maintains a strong tradition of single-sex education, emphasizing close-knit community and leadership development.

== History ==
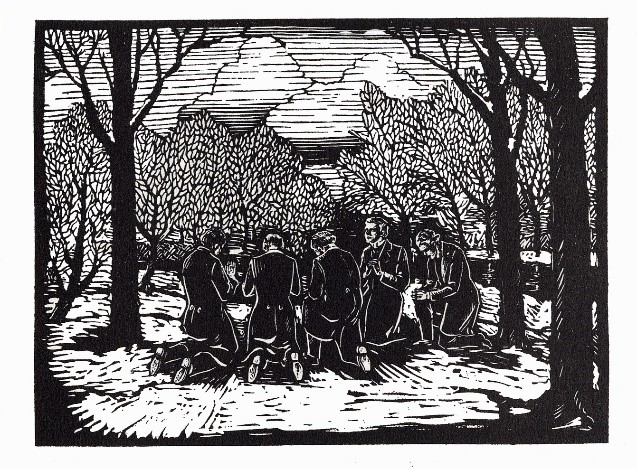
Wabash College founders kneeling in the snow on November 22, 1832

Wabash College was founded on November 21, 1832, by a group of Presbyterian ministers and laymen in Crawfordsville, Indiana. Seeking to bring classical and moral education to the American frontier, the founders envisioned a "classical and English high school, rising into a college as soon as the wants of the country demand." The next day, they dedicated the campus grounds in prayer while kneeling in the snow—a moment that became symbolic of Wabash's spiritual and intellectual mission.

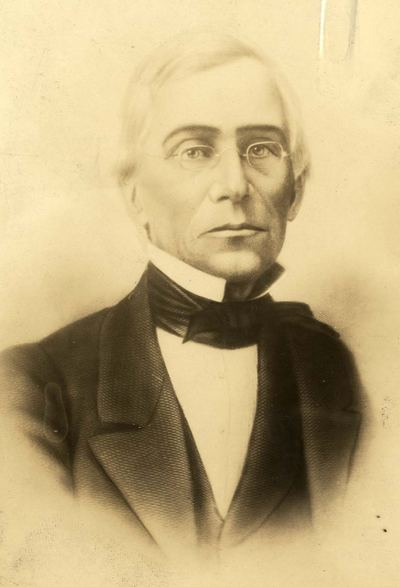
Caleb Mills, first faculty member at Wabash College

Classes began in 1833 on education, and Elihu W. Baldwin became the college's first president in 1835. Early instruction emphasized Classical education, Theology, and a short-lived Manual labor school model. Despite early financial hardship and a devastating fire in 1838, Wabash quickly rebuilt. It developed a distinguished faculty, notably Caleb Mills, a founder of Indiana Department of Education, and Edmund Otis Hovey, who served as professor, trustee, treasurer, and fundraiser for over four decades.

By the mid-19th century, Wabash had become known for its liberal arts education, rooted in classical studies, rhetoric, and moral philosophy. Student life was centered around literary societies such as the Euphronean and Calliopean, which provided early platforms for oratory and debate.

Under president Joseph F. Tuttle (1862–1892), the campus added buildings such as Center Hall and Peck Hall, while Wabash increasingly emphasized scientific education alongside the classics.

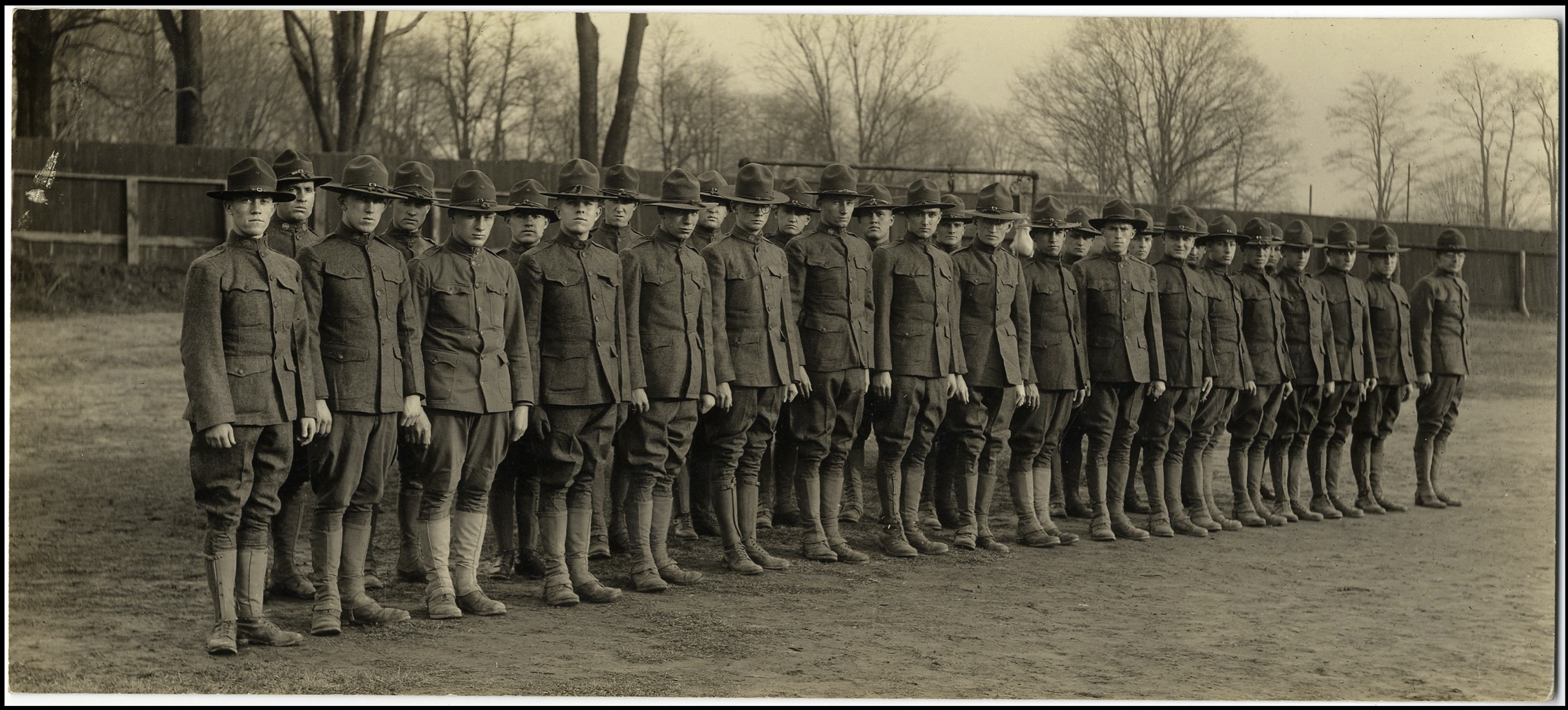
SATC Recruits

In the 20th century, president George L. Mackintosh (1903–1926) instituted major reforms, including the development of the Wabash Plan, which emphasized faculty-student dialogue, senior comprehensive exams, and a distinctive curriculum rooted in interdisciplinary learning. During World War I, Wabash hosted a Student Army Training Corps unit, and during World War II, the college trained Navy officers through the V-12 Navy College Training Program.

The postwar period brought enrollment growth through the G.I. Bill and further academic reform. Despite broader national trends toward coeducation, Wabash remained a men's college, reaffirming that identity via a campus-wide referendum in 1992.

In the 21st century, Wabash has prioritized global learning, undergraduate research, and leadership programs like WabashX. The college maintains traditions such as Chapel Sing, Ringing In and Out, and the annual Monon Bell Classic against DePauw University. With a strong alumni network, modern facilities, and a commitment to the liberal arts, Wabash continues its mission: "to educate men to think critically, act responsibly, lead effectively, and live humanely."

== Academics ==
Wabash College offers a liberal arts education leading exclusively to the Bachelor of Arts degree. All students follow a structured curriculum that emphasizes critical thinking, effective communication, ethical reasoning, and global citizenship.

Students complete general education requirements in three academic divisions: Humanities, Social Sciences, and Natural Sciences. They must also demonstrate core competencies in writing, oral communication, quantitative reasoning, and diversity and inclusion. One of the college's signature academic features is the comprehensive examination, a capstone assessment required of all seniors in their major field.

=== Majors and minors ===
Wabash offers more than 25 majors and minors across the arts, humanities, sciences, and social sciences. Popular majors include Political Science, Economics, Psychology, Biology, and Rhetoric. Interdisciplinary and special programs include:

- Philosophy, Politics and Economics
- Global health
- Gender studies
- Multicultural American Studies

Students may also propose independent majors with faculty approval.

=== Rankings ===
Wabash is consistently ranked among the top liberal arts colleges in the United States.U.S. News & World Report

- 44th in National Liberal Arts Colleges (In its 2027 rankings)
- Top-35 Best Value School

Niche ranks Wabash as the 28th best liberal arts college in the United States for "2026". Archived from the original on 7 December 2025..

The Princeton Review (2026 edition) recognized Wabash in several categories:

- 2nd in Best Internship Opportunities
- 2nd in Most Accessible Professors
- 4th in Best Career Services
- 5th in Best Alumni Network
- 8th in Best Classroom Experience
- 17th in Best Colleges in America, Ranked by Value
- 19th in Best Athletic Facilities

=== Comprehensive examinations ===
All Wabash seniors are required to pass both oral and written comprehensive examinations in their major field and general studies, a hallmark of the college's academic program. These exams assess students' mastery of core disciplinary concepts, their ability to synthesize information, and their written and oral communication skills.

== Student life ==
As of 2024, Wabash College enrolled 822 undergraduate students. The college remains one of the few all-male liberal arts institutions in the United States.

=== Racial and ethnic breakdown ===
Race/Ethnicity	Percentage
White	70.2%
Hispanic or Latino	13.5%
Black or African American	4.4%
Asian	1.4%
Two or More Races	4.0%
International	6.0%
Unknown	1.2%

Source: Wabash College Diversity Disclosure Report, 2024

=== Socioeconomic breakdown ===
Indicator	Percentage
Students receiving Pell Grants	24.8%
Students not receiving Pell Grants	75.2%
Students receiving any financial aid	~99%

Source: U.S. News & World Report, 2024

=== Traditions ===
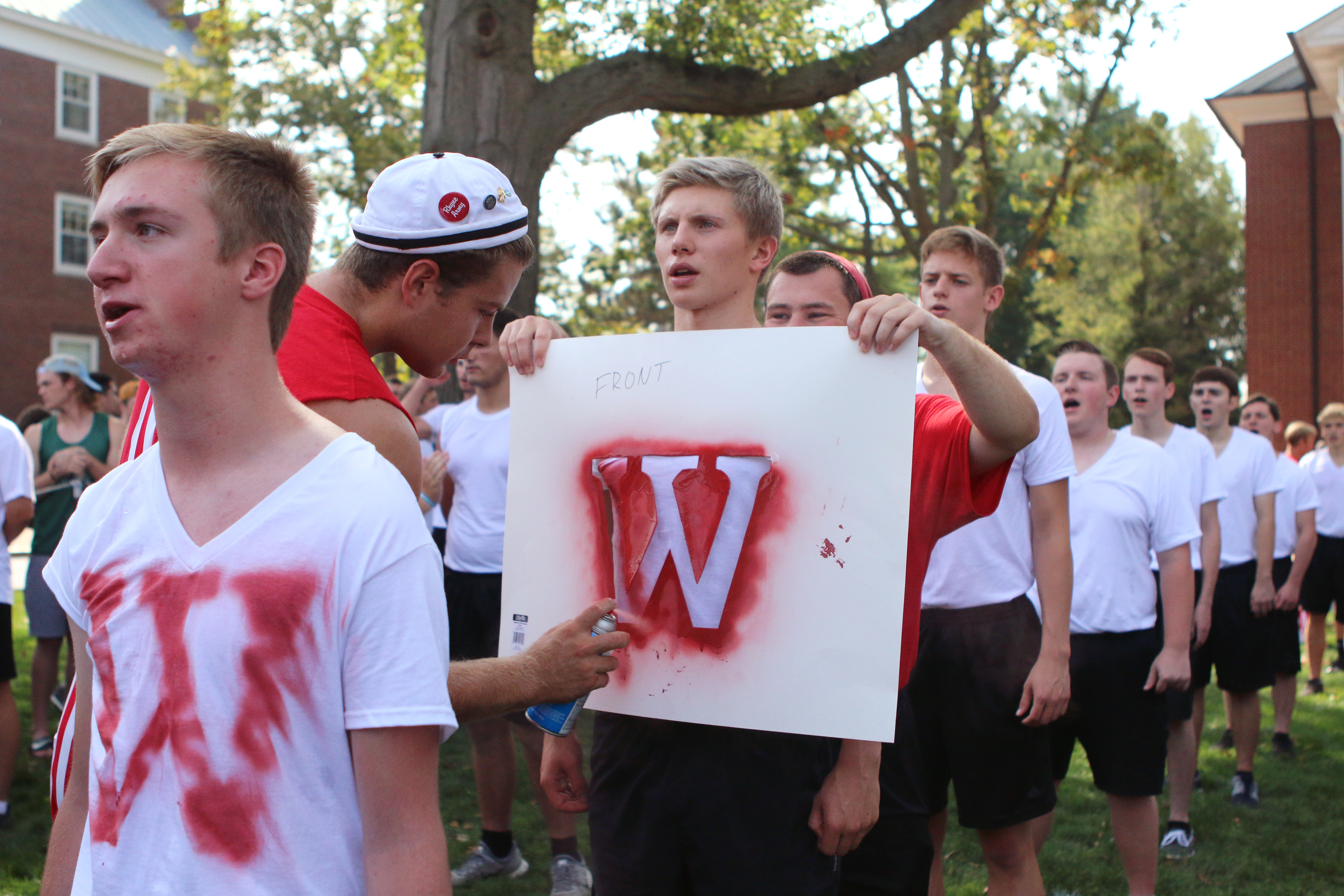
A Wabash College student earning their W during Chapel Sing.

One of Wabash's most symbolic ceremonies is Ringing In Saturday, which marks the beginning of each student's college experience. Incoming freshmen are formally welcomed by the dean of students, the dean of admissions, the president of the alumni association, and the college president. Each student is ceremonially "rung in" by the president using the same bell that Caleb Mills, the college's first teacher, used in the 1830s.

During Homecoming Week, Wabash hosts Chapel Sing, a tradition where fraternity pledges (and independent students) attempt to sing the college fight song, Old Wabash, in unison before a panel of judges. Organized by the Student Senate and the Sphinx Club, Chapel Sing symbolizes school pride and serves as a rite of passage.

=== Student government ===
The Wabash College student government is formally known as the Student Body of Wabash College. It operates under a tripartite structure with executive, legislative, and judicial branches.

=== Student organizations ===
Wabash supports a diverse array of student-led clubs and organizations. Groups represent interests including academics, community service, performing arts, political advocacy, identity and culture, and recreation. All organizations are eligible to receive funding through the Student Senate, which manages the student activity fee assessed each semester.

The college newspaper, The Bachelor, has been continuously published since 1908 and covers news, sports, editorials, and student opinion.

=== Fraternities ===
Approximately 50–60% of Wabash students join one of the college's fraternities, which play a significant role in social, residential, and extracurricular life. The first chapter, Beta Theta Pi, was founded at Wabash in 1846 and has remained active since.

=== The Gentleman's Rule ===
Wabash College does not employ a traditional student code of conduct. Instead, the institution relies on a single guiding principle known as the Gentleman's Rule:

The student is expected to conduct himself at all times, both on and off campus, as a gentleman and a responsible citizen.

This rule entrusts students with personal responsibility for their actions and is considered the college's oldest and most defining tradition. It is enforced through community standards, administrative discretion, and peer accountability rather than a formal disciplinary code.

== Endowment ==
As of 2025, Wabash College's endowment was valued at approximately $465 million, equating to about $556,886 per student. This positions Wabash among the top liberal arts colleges in the United States in terms of endowment per student.

=== Giant Steps campaign ===
From July 1, 2017, to June 30, 2023, Wabash College conducted the "Giant Steps" campaign, the largest fundraising effort in its history. The campaign raised over $250 million from 12,029 donors who made 82,272 gifts, surpassing the original goal of $225 million.

A notable contribution to the campaign was a $40 million gift from alumni Paul Woolls '75 and his wife, Betty O'Shaughnessy Woolls, marking the largest single donation in the college's history.

=== Endowment management ===
In 2015, Wabash College partnered with Strategic Investment Group to serve as its outsourced chief investment officer (OCIO). This collaboration has yielded significant returns; over a seven-year period, endowment returns exceeded benchmarks by $14.1 million.

The college employs a 12-quarter rolling average to determine its annual endowment draw, which was set at 5.5% for fiscal years 2022 and 2023. This approach aims to provide a predictable stream of funding while preserving the endowment's long-term purchasing power.

=== Financial aid and scholarships ===
"Approximately 99% of Wabash students receive some form of student aid."

== Athletics ==
Wabash College competes in NCAA Division III as a member of the North Coast Athletic Conference (NCAC). The college fields 13 intercollegiate varsity sports, all for men, consistent with its status as one of the nation's last remaining all-male colleges. The school's athletic teams are known as the Little Giants.

Since 2021, Wabash has fielded a varsity men's volleyball team, competing in the Midwest Collegiate Volleyball League, as the NCAC sponsors volleyball only for women. Wabash's athletic cheer is "Wabash Always Fights", and the college maintains a strong tradition of athletic excellence, student involvement, and alumni support.

The school's varsity sports include: baseball, basketball, cross country, football, golf, lacrosse, soccer, swimming and diving, tennis, track and field, volleyball, and wrestling.

=== Rivalries ===
Wabash College maintains a rivalry with DePauw University through the annual Monon Bell Classic. First played in 1890, the game has been held annually since 1911 (with exceptions during World War II and the COVID-19 pandemic) and features the two Indiana schools vying for the 300-pound locomotive bell known as the Monon Bell.

=== Historical highlights ===
Inter-collegiate football at Wabash dates back to 1884, when student-coach Edwin R. Taber assembled a team and defeated Butler University by a score of 4–0 in the first intercollegiate football game in the history of the state of Indiana.

Wabash's athletic history also includes early success in basketball, where the Little Giants reached the Final Four of the 1982 NCAA Division III Tournament, and in wrestling, where the program has produced multiple individual NCAA champions and team podium finishes in recent years.
