= Wabash football, 1884–1889 =

American college football seasons

The Wabash football program from 1884 to 1899 represented Wabash College in its first decade of college football competition. The team did not take on the nickname "Little Giants" until late in the 1904 season. Wabash did not play intercollegiate games in 1885 or 1888.

== 1884 ==
1884 Wabash football
- Conference: Independent
- Record: 1–0
- Head coach: Edwin R. Taber (1st season)

The 1884 Wabash football team represented Wabash College during the 1884 college football season. Led by Edwin R. Taber in his first and only season as head coach, Wabash compiled a record of 1–0.

=== Schedule ===
Date	Opponent	Site	Result
October 25	at Butler	Indianapolis, IN	W 4–0

== 1886 ==
1886 Wabash football
- Conference: Independent
- Record: 2–0–1
- Head coach: Evans Woollen (1st season)
- Captain: William K. Martin

The 1886 Wabash football team represented Wabash College as an independent during the 1886 college football season. Led by Evans Woollen in his first and only season as head coach, Wabash compiled a record of 2–0–1. William K. Martin was the team's captain.

=== Schedule ===
Date	Time	Opponent	Site	Result	Source
October 23	3:30 p.m.	vs. Franklin (IN)	Athletic Park; Indianapolis, IN	T 4–4	
November 6	3:00 p.m.	vs. Franklin (IN)	Athletic Park; Indianapolis, IN	W 8–4	
November 20	3:00 p.m.	vs. Hanover	Indianapolis, IN	W 23–4	

== 1887 ==
1887 Wabash football
- Conference: Independent
- Record: 0–1
- Head coach: William K. Martin (1st season)

The 1887 Wabash football team represented Wabash College as an independent during the 1887 college football season. Led by William K. Martin in his first and only season as head coach, Wabash compiled a record of 0–1.

=== Schedule ===
Date	Time	Opponent	Site	Result	Source
October 22	2:30 p.m.	vs. Hanover	Athletic Park; Indianapolis, IN	L 10–12	

== 1889 ==
1889 Wabash football
- Conference: Independent
- Record: 1–1
- Head coach: C. Sherman King (1st season)

The 1889 Wabash football team represented Wabash College as an independent during the 1889 college football season. Led by C. Sherman King in his first and only season as head coach, Wabash compiled a record of 1–1.

=== Schedule ===
Date	Time	Opponent	Site	Result	Source
November 16	2:00 p.m.	at Indiana	Bloomington, IN	W 40–0	
November 23	2:15 p.m.	Purdue	Crawfordsville, IN	L 4–18	
