= 1894 Holy Ghost College football team =

American college football season

1894 Holy Ghost College football
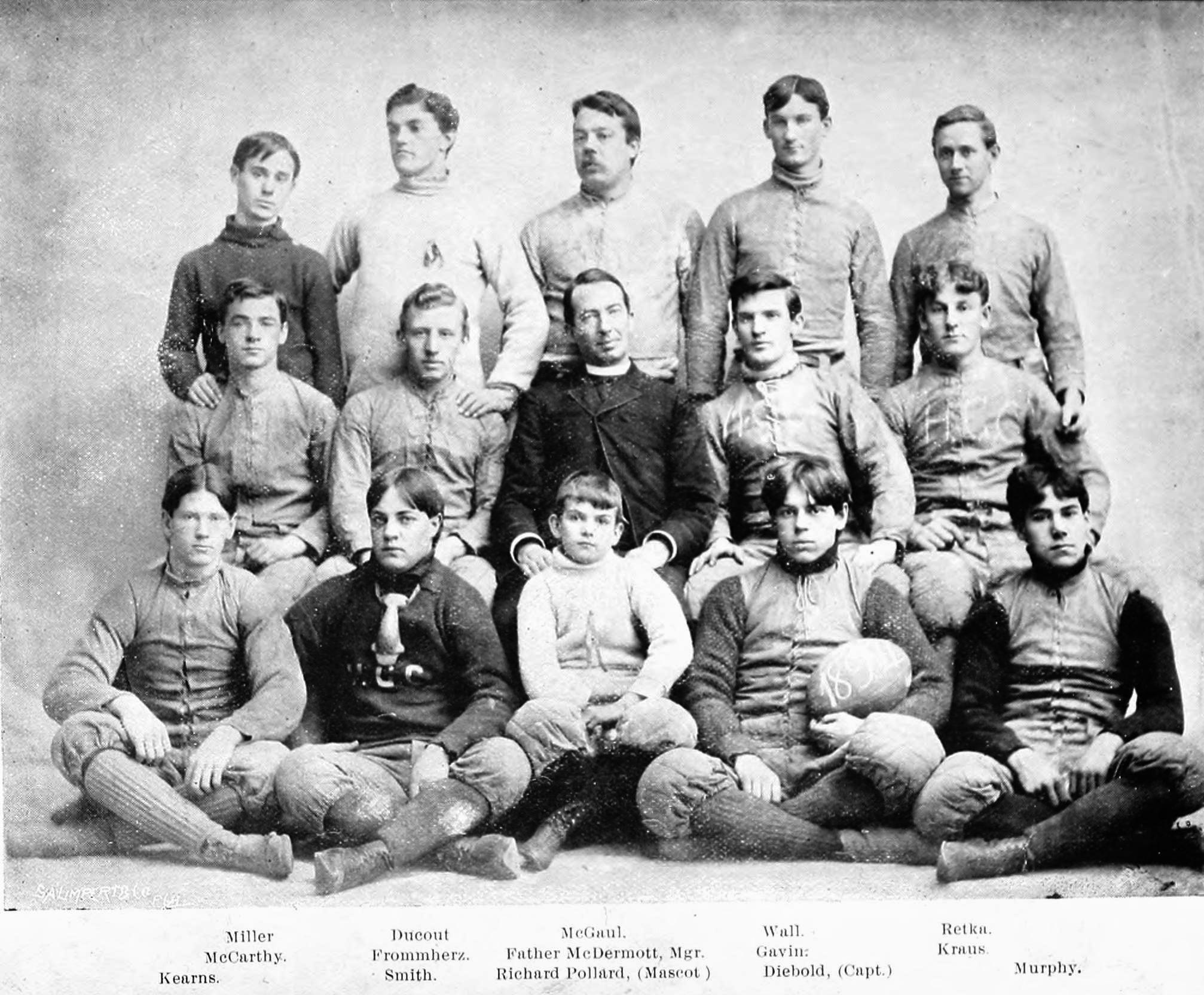
- Conference: Independent
- Head coach: George S. Proctor (1st season)
- Captain: Frank X. Diebold

1894 Eastern college football independents records
	Conf.			Overall
Team	W	L	T	W		L		T
Yale		–		16	–	0	–	0
Penn		–		12	–	0	–	0
Villanova		–		1	–	0	–	0
Penn State		–		6	–	0	–	1
Harvard		–		11	–	2	–	0
Geneva		–		5	–	1	–	0
Princeton		–		8	–	2	–	0
Temple		–		4	–	1	–	0
Holy Ghost College		–		7	–	2	–	1
Washington & Jefferson		–		5	–	2	–	1
Brown		–		10	–	5	–	0
Bucknell		–		5	–	3	–	0
Colgate		–		2	–	1	–	1
Army		–		3	–	2	–	0
Franklin & Marshall		–		6	–	4	–	0
Cornell		–		6	–	4	–	1
Amherst		–		7	–	5	–	0
Trinity (CT)		–		4	–	3	–	0
Syracuse		–		6	–	5	–	0
Tufts		–		6	–	5	–	0
Massachusetts		–		3	–	3	–	0
Swarthmore		–		5	–	5	–	0
Western Univ. Penn		–		1	–	1	–	0
Lafayette		–		5	–	6	–	0
New Hampshire		–		2	–	3	–	0
Rutgers		–		4	–	6	–	0
Lehigh		–		5	–	9	–	0
Williams		–		1	–	3	–	0
Drexel		–		1	–	3	–	0
MIT		–		1	–	4	–	0
Boston College		–		1	–	6	–	0
Carlisle		–		1	–	8	–	0
Buffalo		–		0	–	2	–	0
NYU		–		0	–	3	–	0
Wesleyan		–		0	–	5	–	0

The 1894 Holy Ghost College football team was an American football team that represented Pittsburgh Catholic College of the Holy Ghost—now known as Duquesne University—during the 1894 college football season. Pittsburgh Athletic Club player George S. Proctor served as the team's head coach. In eleven documented games, the team's record was 8–3 or 7–4, depending on the disputed outcome of a game against Greensburg. Duquesne University's football record book claims a record of 9–3.

== Schedule ==
Date	Opponent	Site	Result	Source
October 6	Hazelwood Athletic Club	Holy Ghost College grounds; Pittsburgh, PA	W 6–0	
October 13	Nonpareil Athletic Club (Allegheny, PA)	Holy Ghost College grounds; Pittsburgh, PA	W 24–6 or 22–6	
October 20	at Oakmont	Oakmont, PA	L 4–8	
October 27	at Beaver Falls YMCA	Beaver Falls, PA	L 6–10 or 6–12	
October 31	Pittsburgh Athletic Club Reserves	Holy Ghost College grounds; Pittsburgh, PA	W 10–4	
November 3	Avalon Amateur Athletic Association	Holy Ghost College grounds; Pittsburgh, PA	W 48–0	
November 10	at Greensburg Athletic Association	Greensburg, PA	? 4–0 or 4–6	
November 17	Bellevue Athletic Club	Holy Ghost College grounds; Pittsburgh, PA	W 44–0	
November 22	Shady Side Athletic Club		W 16–5	
November 24	Beaver Falls YMCA	Holy Ghost College grounds; Pittsburgh, PA	W 14–10	
November 29	at Martins Ferry Viligants	Irwin Park; Wheeling, WV	L 0–10 or 0–12	
