= 1894 Brown Bears football team =

American college football season

1894 Brown Bears football
- Conference: Independent
- Record: 10–5
- Head coach: William G. Norton (1st season)
- Captain: W. B. Hopkins
- Home stadium: Lincoln Field, Adelaide Park

1894 Eastern college football independents records
	Conf.			Overall
Team	W	L	T	W		L		T
Yale		–		16	–	0	–	0
Penn		–		12	–	0	–	0
Villanova		–		1	–	0	–	0
Penn State		–		6	–	0	–	1
Harvard		–		11	–	2	–	0
Geneva		–		5	–	1	–	0
Princeton		–		8	–	2	–	0
Temple		–		4	–	1	–	0
Holy Ghost College		–		7	–	2	–	1
Washington & Jefferson		–		5	–	2	–	1
Brown		–		10	–	5	–	0
Bucknell		–		5	–	3	–	0
Colgate		–		2	–	1	–	1
Army		–		3	–	2	–	0
Franklin & Marshall		–		6	–	4	–	0
Cornell		–		6	–	4	–	1
Amherst		–		7	–	5	–	0
Trinity (CT)		–		4	–	3	–	0
Syracuse		–		6	–	5	–	0
Tufts		–		6	–	5	–	0
Massachusetts		–		3	–	3	–	0
Swarthmore		–		5	–	5	–	0
Western Univ. Penn		–		1	–	1	–	0
Lafayette		–		5	–	6	–	0
New Hampshire		–		2	–	3	–	0
Rutgers		–		4	–	6	–	0
Lehigh		–		5	–	9	–	0
Williams		–		1	–	3	–	0
Drexel		–		1	–	3	–	0
MIT		–		1	–	4	–	0
Boston College		–		1	–	6	–	0
Carlisle		–		1	–	8	–	0
Buffalo		–		0	–	2	–	0
NYU		–		0	–	3	–	0
Wesleyan		–		0	–	5	–	0

The 1894 Brown Bears football team represented Brown University as an independent in the 1894 college football season. Led by William G. Norton in his first and only season as head coach, Brown compiled a record of 10–5.

== Schedule ==
Date	Time	Opponent	Site	Result	Attendance	Source
September 29		Fort Adams	Providence, RI	W 58–0		
October 3		at Yale	Yale Field; New Haven, CT	L 0–28	2,500	
October 6		Boston Athletic Association	Lincoln Field; Providence, RI	W 28–0		
October 11	4:00 p.m.	at Harvard	Soldiers' Field; Boston, MA	L 4–18	2,000	
October 13	3:30 p.m.	at Army	The Plain; West Point, NY	W 10–0		
October 17		at Phillips Academy	Andover, MA	W 14–0	600	
October 20		Wesleyan	Lincoln Field; Providence, RI	W 26–0		
October 24		at Boston Tech	South End Grounds; Boston, MA	L 4–8	400	
October 31		at Tufts	College Hill; Medford, MA	W 30–0	300	
November 3	3:15 p.m.	Yale	Adelaide Park; Providence, RI	L 0–12	5,000	
November 10		at Orange Athletic Club	Orange Oval; East Orange, NJ	W 12–10	1,500	
November 15	3:30 p.m.	at Harvard	Soldiers' Field; Cambridge, MA	L 0–18	4,000–5,000	
November 17		Bowdoin	Providence, RI	W 42–0		
November 24	10:30 a.m.	vs. Dartmouth	Outing Park; Springfield, MA	W 20–4	1,200	
November 29		Boston Tech	Adelaide Park; Providence, RI	W 16–4	4,000	
