= 1894 Western University of Pennsylvania football team =

American college football season

1894 Western University of Pennsylvania football
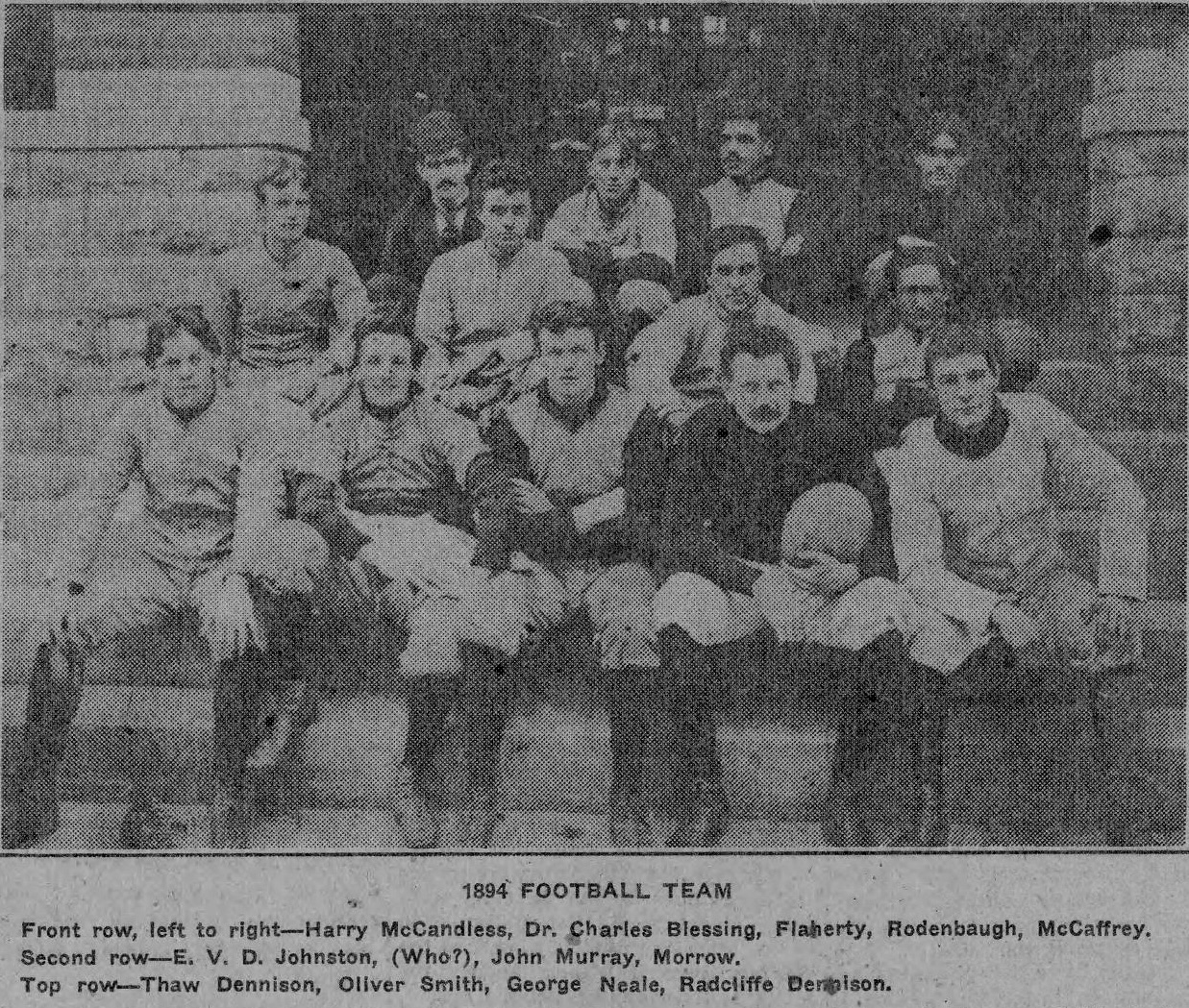
- Conference: Independent
- Record: 1–1
- Head coach: None

1894 Eastern college football independents records
	Conf.			Overall
Team	W	L	T	W		L		T
Yale		–		16	–	0	–	0
Penn		–		12	–	0	–	0
Villanova		–		1	–	0	–	0
Penn State		–		6	–	0	–	1
Harvard		–		11	–	2	–	0
Geneva		–		5	–	1	–	0
Princeton		–		8	–	2	–	0
Temple		–		4	–	1	–	0
Holy Ghost College		–		7	–	2	–	1
Washington & Jefferson		–		5	–	2	–	1
Brown		–		10	–	5	–	0
Bucknell		–		5	–	3	–	0
Colgate		–		2	–	1	–	1
Army		–		3	–	2	–	0
Franklin & Marshall		–		6	–	4	–	0
Cornell		–		6	–	4	–	1
Amherst		–		7	–	5	–	0
Trinity (CT)		–		4	–	3	–	0
Syracuse		–		6	–	5	–	0
Tufts		–		6	–	5	–	0
Massachusetts		–		3	–	3	–	0
Swarthmore		–		5	–	5	–	0
Western Univ. Penn		–		1	–	1	–	0
Lafayette		–		5	–	6	–	0
New Hampshire		–		2	–	3	–	0
Rutgers		–		4	–	6	–	0
Lehigh		–		5	–	9	–	0
Williams		–		1	–	3	–	0
Drexel		–		1	–	3	–	0
MIT		–		1	–	4	–	0
Boston College		–		1	–	6	–	0
Carlisle		–		1	–	8	–	0
Buffalo		–		0	–	2	–	0
NYU		–		0	–	3	–	0
Wesleyan		–		0	–	5	–	0

The 1894 Western University of Pennsylvania football team was an American football team that represented the Western University of Pennsylvania (now known as the University of Pittsburgh) as an independent during the 1894 college football season.

== Schedule ==
Date	Opponent	Site	Result	Source
October 13	at Sewickley Athletic Club	Sewickley, PA	W 6–0	
October 27	at Indiana Normal (PA)	Indiana, PA	L 0–44	

== Season recap ==
The 1894 football season for the Western University of Pennsylvania (WUP) was a short two-game affair. The forfeiture of the two football games the previous year and the desire of the WUP's best players to play for a club team left the athletic department in somewhat of a chaotic mess. Their best player, Joe Trees, opted to play for the Pittsburgh Athletic Club. Neither the Athletic Association nor the Alumni Athletic Advisory Board made an effort to regenerate interest in Western University football for this season. The team compiled a 1–1 record and was outscored by a total of 44 to 6.

Edwin V. D. Johnston elucidated the troubles encountered during 1894 in an article in the February 16, 1921 Pitt Weekly:

"The financial affairs of the Association were in bad shape and the treasurer was unable to get sufficient funds to wipe out the $500 indebtedness. At a meeting of the Association Walter MacFarren was elected president and I was given the job of raising the $500. In the fall there were very few of the first or second teams (from 1893) who returned to college, partly on account of the financial crisis at that time. We decided to have a football team, however. The leading spirit in keeping things from smashing entirely was Clifford B. Connelly, now commissioner of the Department of Labor of Pennsylvania. We did not have any money to buy equipment and it was hard to get a team together. In some cases we were compelled to fill up with boys who expected to come to W.U.P. later. I must say for that team, however, that weight, size and reputation made no difference to them and, to use the vulgar expression, they surely had the 'guts'."

== Game summaries ==
=== At Sewickley Athletic Club ===
WUP at Sewickley Athletic Club

Team	1	2	Total
• WUP	6	0	6
Sewickley A.C.	0	0	0

- Date: October 13, 1894
- Location: Sewickley Grounds, Sewickley, PA

On October 13, the first game of the 1894 season was played against the Sewickley Athletic Club in Sewickley, Pennsylvania. Early in the first half, WUP fullback Denniston scored a touchdown. Marchand kicked the goal after and the WUP had a 6–0 lead. The rest of the game was mostly played in Sewickley's territory but the WUP offense was unable to capitalize and score again.

The WUP starting lineup for the Sewickley game was Frank Blessing (left end), L. Marchand (left tackle), Charles Murray (left guard), Kohne (center), Kelly (right guard), Grove (right tackle), Ned Johnston (right end), Morrow (quarterback), Charles Rankin (left halfback), George Neale (right halfback) and Radcliffe Denniston (fullback). This game consisted of 20-minute halves.

=== At Indiana Normal ===
WUP at Indiana Normal

Team	1	2	Total
WUP	0	0	0
• Indiana Normal	22	22	44

- Date: October 27, 1894
- Location: Normal Grounds, Indiana, PA
- Referee: White

On October 27, the WUP squad traveled to Indiana, Pennsylvania to do battle with the Indiana Normal eleven. The game consisted of 30–minute halves. The WUP eleven were outweighed, outmanned and outplayed as they went down to defeat 44–0. Halfback Kinports led the Normal assault on the WUP defense. He was ably assisted by Reed, Campbell, Feit, and Noble. The only downside for the Normal eleven was when halfback Reed fractured his ankle and was carried from the field. Noble replaced him and promptly scored a touchdown. The WUP offense only had the ball twice and was unable to generate any type of sustained drive. Quarterback Frank Blessing led the WUP team in tackling.

The WUP starting lineup for the game against Indiana Normal was Ned Johnston (left end), Morrow (left tackle), Hagerty (left guard), Rodenbaugh (center), W.A. McCaffrey (right guard), Grove (right tackle), Charles Murray (right end), Frank Blessing (quarterback), McCandless (left halfback), George Neale (left halfback) and Radcliffe Denniston (fullback). Smith substituted for Johnston at left end.

== Roster ==
The roster of the 1894 Western University of Pennsylvania football team:

- Dr. Frank Blessing (left end) received his Doctor of Medicine degree in 1899 and lived in Pittsburgh.
- Dr. Charles S. Murray (left guard) received his Doctor of Medicine degree in 1897 and lived in Sewickley, Pa.
- Edwin "Ned" Johnston (right end) received his degree in Mechanical Engineering in 1897 and lived in Canonsburg, Pa.
- Dr. Charles Rankin (fullback) earned his Doctor of Medicine degree in 1896 and lived in McKeesport, Pennsylvania.
- George Neale (right halfback) received his associate degree from the college in 1895 and lived in Pittsburgh.
- Radcliffe Denniston (fullback) received his associate engineering degree in 1897 and lived in Milwaukee, Wisconsin.
- W. A. McCaffery (left guard) received his Bachelor of Arts degree in 1895 and lived in Pittsburgh.
- L. Marchand (left tackle)
- Thaw Dennison
- Kohne (center)
- Kelly (right guard)
- Grove (right tackle)
- Morrow (quarterback)
- John Murray (left tackle)
- Oliver Smith (left end)
- Rodenbaugh (center)
- Harry McCandless (halfback)
- Hagerty (right guard)
