= 1894 Trinity Bantams football team =

American college football season

1894 Trinity Bantams football
- Conference: Independent
- Record: 4–3
- Head coach: None
- Captain: J. Strawbridge
- Home stadium: Trinity grounds

1894 Eastern college football independents records
| | Conf. | | | Overall |
| Team | W | L | T | W | | L | | T |
|---|---|---|---|---|---|---|---|---|
| Yale | | – | | 16 | – | 0 | – | 0 |
| Penn | | – | | 12 | – | 0 | – | 0 |
| Villanova | | – | | 1 | – | 0 | – | 0 |
| Penn State | | – | | 6 | – | 0 | – | 1 |
| Harvard | | – | | 11 | – | 2 | – | 0 |
| Geneva | | – | | 5 | – | 1 | – | 0 |
| Princeton | | – | | 8 | – | 2 | – | 0 |
| Temple | | – | | 4 | – | 1 | – | 0 |
| Holy Ghost College | | – | | 7 | – | 2 | – | 1 |
| Washington & Jefferson | | – | | 5 | – | 2 | – | 1 |
| Brown | | – | | 10 | – | 5 | – | 0 |
| Bucknell | | – | | 5 | – | 3 | – | 0 |
| Colgate | | – | | 2 | – | 1 | – | 1 |
| Army | | – | | 3 | – | 2 | – | 0 |
| Franklin & Marshall | | – | | 6 | – | 4 | – | 0 |
| Cornell | | – | | 6 | – | 4 | – | 1 |
| Amherst | | – | | 7 | – | 5 | – | 0 |
| Trinity (CT) | | – | | 4 | – | 3 | – | 0 |
| Syracuse | | – | | 6 | – | 5 | – | 0 |
| Tufts | | – | | 6 | – | 5 | – | 0 |
| Massachusetts | | – | | 3 | – | 3 | – | 0 |
| Swarthmore | | – | | 5 | – | 5 | – | 0 |
| Western Univ. Penn | | – | | 1 | – | 1 | – | 0 |
| Lafayette | | – | | 5 | – | 6 | – | 0 |
| New Hampshire | | – | | 2 | – | 3 | – | 0 |
| Rutgers | | – | | 4 | – | 6 | – | 0 |
| Lehigh | | – | | 5 | – | 9 | – | 0 |
| Williams | | – | | 1 | – | 3 | – | 0 |
| Drexel | | – | | 1 | – | 3 | – | 0 |
| MIT | | – | | 1 | – | 4 | – | 0 |
| Boston College | | – | | 1 | – | 6 | – | 0 |
| Carlisle | | – | | 1 | – | 8 | – | 0 |
| Buffalo | | – | | 0 | – | 2 | – | 0 |
| NYU | | – | | 0 | – | 3 | – | 0 |
| Wesleyan | | – | | 0 | – | 5 | – | 0 |

The 1894 Trinity Bantams football team represented the Trinity College as an independent during the 1894 college football season. Trinity compiled a record of 4–3.

== Schedule ==
| Date | Time | Opponent | Site | Result | Attendance | Source |
|---|---|---|---|---|---|---|
| September 29 | | Yale | Trinity grounds; Hartford, CT | L 0–42 | 600 | |
| October 6 | | Massachusetts | Trinity grounds; Hartford, CT | W 10–0 | | |
| October 13 | 3:30 p.m. | Hartford Wheel Club | Trinity grounds; Hartford, CT | W 16–0 | | |
| October 20 | | Tufts | Trinity grounds; Hartford, CT | L 4–8 | 600 | |
| October 27 | 3:30 p.m. | Worcester Tech | Trinity grounds; Hartford, CT | W 4–0 | | |
| November 17 | | at Boston Tech | South End Grounds; Boston, MA | L 0–18 | 350 | |
| November 29 | | at Laureate Boat Club | West Troy grounds; Troy, NY | W 10–0 | 2,000 | |
