= 1894 Cornell Big Red football team =

American college football season

1894 Cornell Big Red football
- Conference: Independent
- Record: 6–4–1
- Head coach: Marshall Newell (1st season)
- Captain: Pop Warner
- Home stadium: Percy Field

1894 Eastern college football independents records
	Conf.			Overall
Team	W	L	T	W		L		T
Yale		–		16	–	0	–	0
Penn		–		12	–	0	–	0
Villanova		–		1	–	0	–	0
Penn State		–		6	–	0	–	1
Harvard		–		11	–	2	–	0
Geneva		–		5	–	1	–	0
Princeton		–		8	–	2	–	0
Temple		–		4	–	1	–	0
Holy Ghost College		–		7	–	2	–	1
Washington & Jefferson		–		5	–	2	–	1
Brown		–		10	–	5	–	0
Bucknell		–		5	–	3	–	0
Colgate		–		2	–	1	–	1
Army		–		3	–	2	–	0
Franklin & Marshall		–		6	–	4	–	0
Cornell		–		6	–	4	–	1
Amherst		–		7	–	5	–	0
Trinity (CT)		–		4	–	3	–	0
Syracuse		–		6	–	5	–	0
Tufts		–		6	–	5	–	0
Massachusetts		–		3	–	3	–	0
Swarthmore		–		5	–	5	–	0
Western Univ. Penn		–		1	–	1	–	0
Lafayette		–		5	–	6	–	0
New Hampshire		–		2	–	3	–	0
Rutgers		–		4	–	6	–	0
Lehigh		–		5	–	9	–	0
Williams		–		1	–	3	–	0
Drexel		–		1	–	3	–	0
MIT		–		1	–	4	–	0
Boston College		–		1	–	6	–	0
Carlisle		–		1	–	8	–	0
Buffalo		–		0	–	2	–	0
NYU		–		0	–	3	–	0
Wesleyan		–		0	–	5	–	0

The 1894 Cornell Big Red football team was an American football team that represented Cornell University during the 1894 college football season. In their first season under head coach Marshall Newell, the Big Red compiled a 6–4–1 record and outscored all opponents by a combined total of 178 to 58. Pop Warner was the team's captain.

== Schedule ==
Date	Time	Opponent	Site	Result	Attendance	Source
September 26		Syracuse	Percy Field; Ithaca, NY	W 39–0		
October 6		Union (NY)	Percy Field; Ithaca, NY	W 37–0		
October 13		Lafayette	Percy Field; Ithaca, NY	W 24–0		
October 20		vs. Princeton	Manhattan Field; New York, NY	L 4–12	5,000	
October 27		vs. Harvard	Manhattan Field; New York, NY	L 12–22	8,000	
November 3		Michigan	Percy Field; Ithaca, NY	W 22–0	1,000	
November 6		at Crescent Athletic Club	Eastern Park; Brooklyn, NY	W 22–0	3,000	
November 10		vs. Williams	Ridgefield grounds; Albany, NY	T 0–0	2,000–3,000	
November 17		at Penn	Philadelphia, PA (rivalry)	L 0–6		
November 24	2:30 p.m.	vs. Michigan	Detroit Athletic Club Field; Detroit, MI	L 4–12	4,000	
November 29		Lehigh	Percy Field; Ithaca, NY	W 10–6		

== Game summaries ==
=== Michigan ===
On November 24, Cornell lost to Michigan, 12–4. The result was the first victory by a Michigan football team against one of the elite Eastern football teams, and "the Michigan men went wild" as blue and yellow were "all the colors that could be seen." The Detroit Free Press filled its front page with a lengthy account of the game under the headline, "GLORIOUS!", and proclaimed the start of "halcyon days at the university" and opined that "the day of logy teams, slow signalling and dumb playing at the university are but pages in history now." The Free Press predicted that the victory would mark a turning point in the popularity of football in the West, such that "it will become the only acknowledged game of the fall, and its devotees will outnumber those of any other game." The University of Michigan yearbook, The Palladium, wrote: "The enthusiasm of that day at Detroit transformed our foot ball team from the practically 'backwoods' organization that they were to skillful, scientific players of the great American game of foot ball. Let the good work go on."
