= 1894 Boston College football team =

American college football season

1894 Boston College football
- Conference: Independent
- Record: 1–6
- Head coach: William Nagle (1st season)
- Captain: Maurice Flynn
- Home stadium: South End Grounds

1894 Eastern college football independents records
	Conf.			Overall
Team	W	L	T	W		L		T
Yale		–		16	–	0	–	0
Penn		–		12	–	0	–	0
Villanova		–		1	–	0	–	0
Penn State		–		6	–	0	–	1
Harvard		–		11	–	2	–	0
Geneva		–		5	–	1	–	0
Princeton		–		8	–	2	–	0
Temple		–		4	–	1	–	0
Holy Ghost College		–		7	–	2	–	1
Washington & Jefferson		–		5	–	2	–	1
Brown		–		10	–	5	–	0
Bucknell		–		5	–	3	–	0
Colgate		–		2	–	1	–	1
Army		–		3	–	2	–	0
Franklin & Marshall		–		6	–	4	–	0
Cornell		–		6	–	4	–	1
Amherst		–		7	–	5	–	0
Trinity (CT)		–		4	–	3	–	0
Syracuse		–		6	–	5	–	0
Tufts		–		6	–	5	–	0
Massachusetts		–		3	–	3	–	0
Swarthmore		–		5	–	5	–	0
Western Univ. Penn		–		1	–	1	–	0
Lafayette		–		5	–	6	–	0
New Hampshire		–		2	–	3	–	0
Rutgers		–		4	–	6	–	0
Lehigh		–		5	–	9	–	0
Williams		–		1	–	3	–	0
Drexel		–		1	–	3	–	0
MIT		–		1	–	4	–	0
Boston College		–		1	–	6	–	0
Carlisle		–		1	–	8	–	0
Buffalo		–		0	–	2	–	0
NYU		–		0	–	3	–	0
Wesleyan		–		0	–	5	–	0

The 1894 Boston College football team was an American football team that represented Boston College as an independent during the 1894 college football season. Led by William Nagle in his first and only season as head coach, Boston College compiled a record of 1–6.

== Schedule ==
Date	Opponent	Site	Result	Attendance	Source
October 20	at Saint Anselm	Varick Park; Manchester, NH	L 0–16	500	
October 31	at Andover Academy	Andover, MA	L 0–32	500	
	Saint Anselm		L 0–10		
November 3	at Whitman Athletic Club		L 0–6	800	
November 17	at Brockton YMCA	Brockton, MA	L 4–12		
November 24	at Marlboro YMCU	Marlboro, MA	W 16–0	1,000	
November 29	Boston University School of Medicine	South End Grounds; Boston, MA	L 0–28	1,000–2,000	
