= 1894 Swarthmore Quakers football team =

American college football season

1894 Swarthmore Quakers football
- Conference: Independent
- Record: 5–5
- Head coach: Jacob K. Shell (7th season)
- Captain: Hodge
- Home stadium: Whittier Field

1894 Eastern college football independents records
	Conf.			Overall
Team	W	L	T	W		L		T
Yale		–		16	–	0	–	0
Penn		–		12	–	0	–	0
Villanova		–		1	–	0	–	0
Penn State		–		6	–	0	–	1
Harvard		–		11	–	2	–	0
Geneva		–		5	–	1	–	0
Princeton		–		8	–	2	–	0
Temple		–		4	–	1	–	0
Holy Ghost College		–		7	–	2	–	1
Washington & Jefferson		–		5	–	2	–	1
Brown		–		10	–	5	–	0
Bucknell		–		5	–	3	–	0
Colgate		–		2	–	1	–	1
Army		–		3	–	2	–	0
Franklin & Marshall		–		6	–	4	–	0
Cornell		–		6	–	4	–	1
Amherst		–		7	–	5	–	0
Trinity (CT)		–		4	–	3	–	0
Syracuse		–		6	–	5	–	0
Tufts		–		6	–	5	–	0
Massachusetts		–		3	–	3	–	0
Swarthmore		–		5	–	5	–	0
Western Univ. Penn		–		1	–	1	–	0
Lafayette		–		5	–	6	–	0
New Hampshire		–		2	–	3	–	0
Rutgers		–		4	–	6	–	0
Lehigh		–		5	–	9	–	0
Williams		–		1	–	3	–	0
Drexel		–		1	–	3	–	0
MIT		–		1	–	4	–	0
Boston College		–		1	–	6	–	0
Carlisle		–		1	–	8	–	0
Buffalo		–		0	–	2	–	0
NYU		–		0	–	3	–	0
Wesleyan		–		0	–	5	–	0

The 1894 Swarthmore Quakers football team was an American football team that represented Swarthmore College as an independent during the 1894 college football season. The team compiled a 5–5 record and outscored opponents by a total of 230 to 202. Jacob K. Shell was the head coach, and Hodge served as the captain.

The rivalry game against Haverford is considered to have the first "action shot" photograph during a football game.

== Schedule ==
Date	Opponent	Site	Result	Attendance	Source
October 6	at Penn	Philadelphia, PA	L 0–66		
October 10	at Lehigh	South Bethlehem, PA	L 0–33		
October 17	Pennsylvania Medical	Whittier Field; Swarthmore, PA	W 54–0	300	
October 24	at Lafayette	March Field; Easton, PA	L 0–46		
October 27	Georgetown	Whittier Field; Swarthmore, PA	L 18–22		
November 3	Dickinson	Whittier Field; Swarthmore, PA	W 66–15		
November 7	Penn JV		L 0–20		
November 10	Franklin & Marshall	Whittier Field; Swarthmore, PA	W 10–0		
November 17	Pennsylvania Military	Whittier Field; Swarthmore, PA	W 50–0	350	
November 24	Haverford	Whittier Field; Swarthmore, PA (rivalry)	W 32–0	1,000	
