= 1894 Bucknell football team =

American college football season

1894 Bucknell football
- Conference: Independent
- Record: 5–3
- Head coach: Will Young (2nd season)
- Captain: William A. Kauffman

1894 Eastern college football independents records
	Conf.			Overall
Team	W	L	T	W		L		T
Yale		–		16	–	0	–	0
Penn		–		12	–	0	–	0
Villanova		–		1	–	0	–	0
Penn State		–		6	–	0	–	1
Harvard		–		11	–	2	–	0
Geneva		–		5	–	1	–	0
Princeton		–		8	–	2	–	0
Temple		–		4	–	1	–	0
Holy Ghost College		–		7	–	2	–	1
Washington & Jefferson		–		5	–	2	–	1
Brown		–		10	–	5	–	0
Bucknell		–		5	–	3	–	0
Colgate		–		2	–	1	–	1
Army		–		3	–	2	–	0
Franklin & Marshall		–		6	–	4	–	0
Cornell		–		6	–	4	–	1
Amherst		–		7	–	5	–	0
Trinity (CT)		–		4	–	3	–	0
Syracuse		–		6	–	5	–	0
Tufts		–		6	–	5	–	0
Massachusetts		–		3	–	3	–	0
Swarthmore		–		5	–	5	–	0
Western Univ. Penn		–		1	–	1	–	0
Lafayette		–		5	–	6	–	0
New Hampshire		–		2	–	3	–	0
Rutgers		–		4	–	6	–	0
Lehigh		–		5	–	9	–	0
Williams		–		1	–	3	–	0
Drexel		–		1	–	3	–	0
MIT		–		1	–	4	–	0
Boston College		–		1	–	6	–	0
Carlisle		–		1	–	8	–	0
Buffalo		–		0	–	2	–	0
NYU		–		0	–	3	–	0
Wesleyan		–		0	–	5	–	0

The 1894 Bucknell football team was an American football team that represented Bucknell University as an independent during the 1894 college football season. Led by second-year head coach Will Young, Bucknell compiled a record of 5–3. William A. Kauffman was elected team captain. Young was graduate of Cornell University.

== Schedule ==
Date	Time	Opponent	Site	Result	Attendance	Source
September 29		Milton	Bucknell campus; Lewisburg, PA	W 54–0		
October 6		Wyoming Seminary	Bucknell campus; Lewisburg, PA	W 34–0	500	
October 13	3:30 p.m.	at Wilkes-Barre	Athletic Park; Wilkes-Barre, PA	L 0–4		
October 20		Franklin & Marshall	Bucknell campus; Lewisburg, PA	W 42–0	3,000	
October 27	3:00 p.m.	vs. Colgate	Scranton baseball park; Scranton, PA	W 12–8		
November 10	2:30 p.m.	Carlisle	Bucknell campus; Lewisburg, PA	W 10–0	1,000	
November 17		vs. Penn State	Athletic Park; Williamsport, PA	L 6–12	2,000	
November 29		at Lafayette	Easton, PA	L 0–44		
