= 1894 New Hampshire football team =

American college football season

1894 New Hampshire football
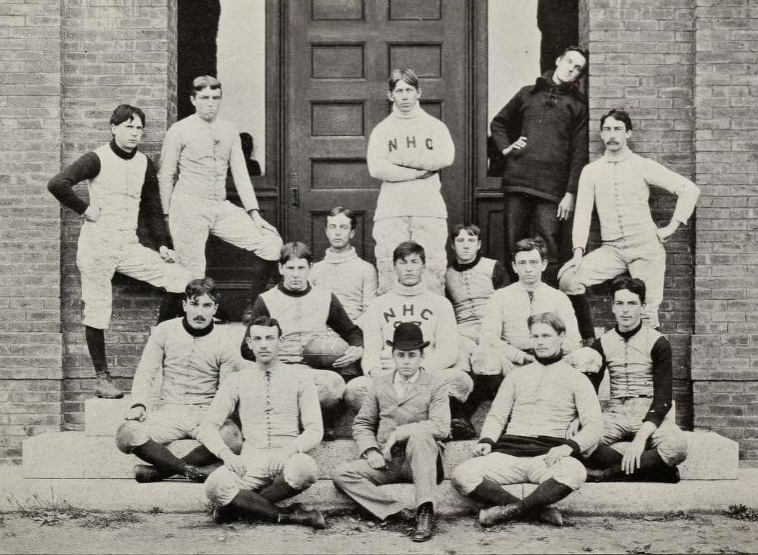
- Team captain William Dudley is seated left of center, holding football; student manager Lewis Kittredge is in the front row, with hat
- Conference: Independent
- Record: 2–3
- Head coach: None
- Captain: William C. Dudley
- Home stadium: College grounds, Durham, NH

1894 Eastern college football independents records
	Conf.			Overall
Team	W	L	T	W		L		T
Yale		–		16	–	0	–	0
Penn		–		12	–	0	–	0
Villanova		–		1	–	0	–	0
Penn State		–		6	–	0	–	1
Harvard		–		11	–	2	–	0
Geneva		–		5	–	1	–	0
Princeton		–		8	–	2	–	0
Temple		–		4	–	1	–	0
Holy Ghost College		–		7	–	2	–	1
Washington & Jefferson		–		5	–	2	–	1
Brown		–		10	–	5	–	0
Bucknell		–		5	–	3	–	0
Colgate		–		2	–	1	–	1
Army		–		3	–	2	–	0
Franklin & Marshall		–		6	–	4	–	0
Cornell		–		6	–	4	–	1
Amherst		–		7	–	5	–	0
Trinity (CT)		–		4	–	3	–	0
Syracuse		–		6	–	5	–	0
Tufts		–		6	–	5	–	0
Massachusetts		–		3	–	3	–	0
Swarthmore		–		5	–	5	–	0
Western Univ. Penn		–		1	–	1	–	0
Lafayette		–		5	–	6	–	0
New Hampshire		–		2	–	3	–	0
Rutgers		–		4	–	6	–	0
Lehigh		–		5	–	9	–	0
Williams		–		1	–	3	–	0
Drexel		–		1	–	3	–	0
MIT		–		1	–	4	–	0
Boston College		–		1	–	6	–	0
Carlisle		–		1	–	8	–	0
Buffalo		–		0	–	2	–	0
NYU		–		0	–	3	–	0
Wesleyan		–		0	–	5	–	0

The 1894 New Hampshire football team (Note: The school did not adopt the Wildcats nickname until February 1926; before then, they were generally referred to as "the blue and white".) was an American football team that represented New Hampshire College of Agriculture and the Mechanic Arts (Note: The school was often referred to as New Hampshire College or New Hampshire State College in newspapers of the era.) during the 1894 college football season—the school became the University of New Hampshire in 1923. The team played a five-game schedule, including the program's first contests against other college teams, Bates and Saint Anselm, and finished with a record of 2–3, being outscored by their opponents by a total of 74 to 32.

== Schedule ==
Scoring during this era awarded 4 points for a touchdown, 2 points for a conversion kick (extra point), and 5 points for a field goal. Teams played in the one-platoon system and the forward pass was not yet legal. Games were played in two halves rather than four quarters.

Date	Opponent	Site	Result	Attendance	Source
October 6	Exeter Academy (second team)	Durham, NH	W 4–0		
October 20	at Bates	Lewiston, ME	L 4–26		
November 15	at Dover High School	Burgett Park; Dover, NH	L 4–10		
November 21	Dover High School	Durham, NH	W 20–6	200	
November 29	at Saint Anselm	Manchester, NH	L 0–32		

A report by the student manager of the team, Lewis H. Kittredge, indicates that two other games had been planned for the season but had to be cancelled; one against McGaw Institute (Merrimack, New Hampshire) and another against the "Andover second eleven" (Phillips Academy of Andover, Massachusetts). Kittredge would go on to become president of the Peerless Motor Company.

== Roster ==
Name	Position	Team photo location
Walter F. Buck	left halfback	standing, far left
Henry M. Chamberlain	right halfback	standing, second from right
Frank DeMerritte	fullback	standing, center, NHC sweater
William C. Dudley (captain)	right guard	seated, middle left, holding football
Elwin H. Forristall	right end	seated, front row, left
Horace L. Howe	substitute	seated, back row, left
J. Norton Hunt	substitute	standing, second from left
Lewis H. Kittredge	student manager	seated, center, wearing hat
George T. McKenna	quarterback	seated, back row, right
William F. Russell	left tackle	seated, far right
Charles A. Trow	left end	seated, front row, right
Charles W. Vickery	substitute	standing, far right
Everett S. Whittemore	center	seated, center, NHC sweater
Tappan S. Wiggin	left guard	seated, middle right, all-white shirt
Perley A. Young	right tackle	seated, far left
