= 1894 Orange Athletic Club football team =

American college football season

1894 Orange Athletic Club football
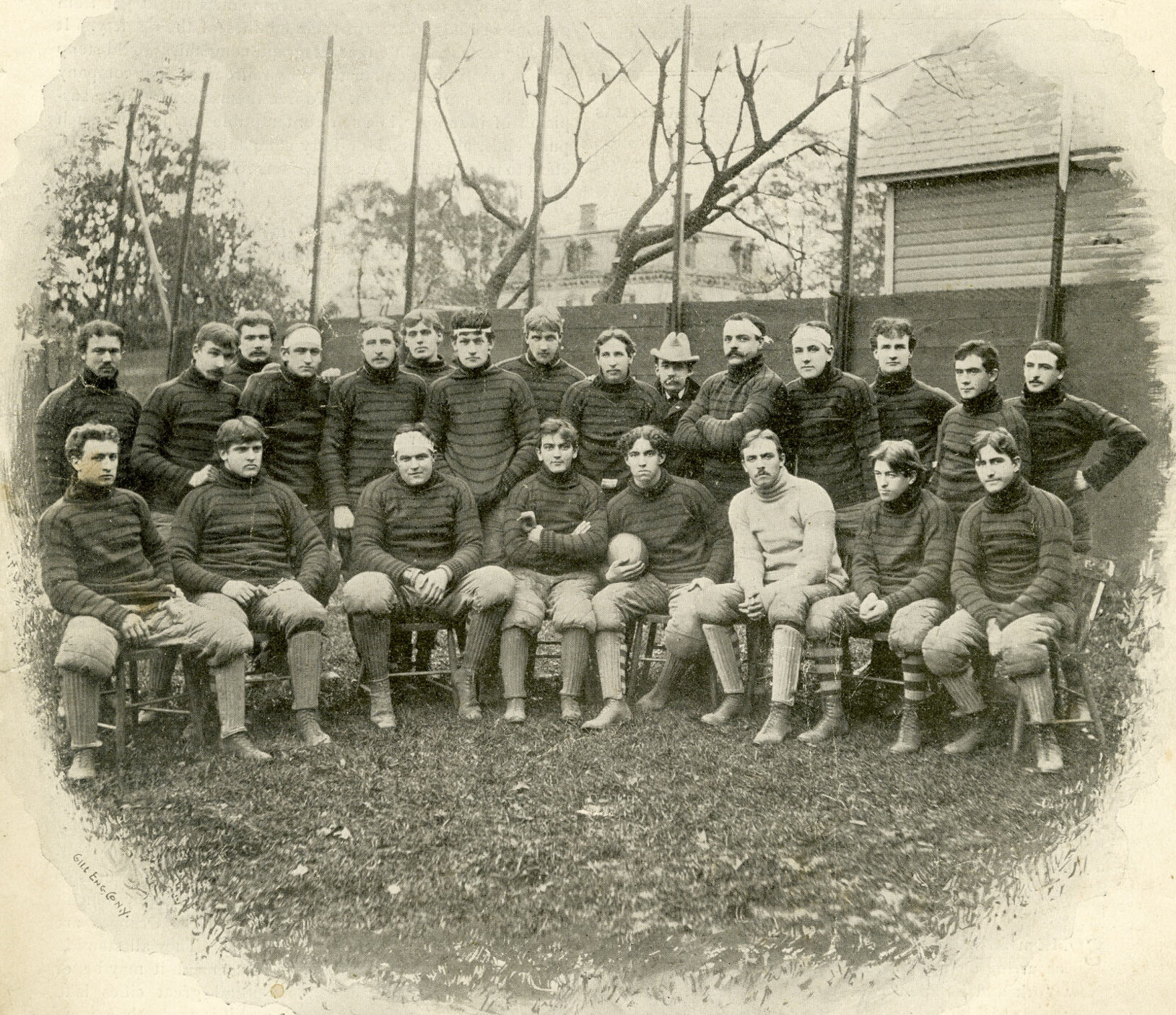

AFU champion
- Conference: American Football Union
- Record: 4–5–1 (1–0 AFU)
- Captain: Frank H. Coyne
- Home stadium: Orange Oval

The 1894 Orange Athletic Club football team was an American football team that represented the Orange Athletic Club in the American Football Union (AFU) during the 1894 college football season. The team played its home games at the Orange Oval in East Orange, New Jersey, compiled a 4–5–1 record (1–0 against AFU opponents), and won the AFU championship. Frank H. Coyne was the team captain.

== Schedule ==
Date	Opponent	Site	Result	Attendance	Source
September 29	Stevens*	Orange Oval; East Orange, NJ	T 6–6	> 1,000	
October 3	New Jersey Athletic Club*	Orange Oval; East Orange, NJ	W 26–0	500	
October 6	Wesleyan*	Orange Oval; East Orange, NJ	W 34–0		
October 13	at Harvard*	Soldiers' Field; Cambridge, MA	L 0–14	300	
October 20	Yale*	Orange Oval; East Orange, NJ	L 0–24	2,500	
October 27	Lehigh*	Orange Oval; East Orange, NJ	W 14–0	1,200–1,500	
November 3	Lafayette*	Orange Oval; East Orange, NJ	L 6–18		
November 10	Brown*	Orange Oval; East Orange, NJ	L 10–12	1,500	
November 17	Crescent Athletic Club	Orange Oval; East Orange, NJ	W 16–8		
November 21	Princeton*	Orange Oval; East Orange, NJ	L 4–16		
*Non-conference game
