= 1894 Drexel Dragons football team =

American college football season

1894 Drexel Dragons football
- Conference: Independent
- Record: 1–3
- Head coach: None
- Captain: N. D. Holbrook

1894 Eastern college football independents records
	Conf.			Overall
Team	W	L	T	W		L		T
Yale		–		16	–	0	–	0
Penn		–		12	–	0	–	0
Villanova		–		1	–	0	–	0
Penn State		–		6	–	0	–	1
Harvard		–		11	–	2	–	0
Geneva		–		5	–	1	–	0
Princeton		–		8	–	2	–	0
Temple		–		4	–	1	–	0
Holy Ghost College		–		7	–	2	–	1
Washington & Jefferson		–		5	–	2	–	1
Brown		–		10	–	5	–	0
Bucknell		–		5	–	3	–	0
Colgate		–		2	–	1	–	1
Army		–		3	–	2	–	0
Franklin & Marshall		–		6	–	4	–	0
Cornell		–		6	–	4	–	1
Amherst		–		7	–	5	–	0
Trinity (CT)		–		4	–	3	–	0
Syracuse		–		6	–	5	–	0
Tufts		–		6	–	5	–	0
Massachusetts		–		3	–	3	–	0
Swarthmore		–		5	–	5	–	0
Western Univ. Penn		–		1	–	1	–	0
Lafayette		–		5	–	6	–	0
New Hampshire		–		2	–	3	–	0
Rutgers		–		4	–	6	–	0
Lehigh		–		5	–	9	–	0
Williams		–		1	–	3	–	0
Drexel		–		1	–	3	–	0
MIT		–		1	–	4	–	0
Boston College		–		1	–	6	–	0
Carlisle		–		1	–	8	–	0
Buffalo		–		0	–	2	–	0
NYU		–		0	–	3	–	0
Wesleyan		–		0	–	5	–	0

The 1894 Drexel Dragons football team represented the Drexel Institute of Technology (renamed Drexel University in 1970) as an independent during the 1894 college football season. The team did not have a head coach.

In either the team's first exhibition game against Penn freshman, or the regular season game against Hamilton School (there are conflicting reports), Knight, playing at fullback, suffered a fractured skull which killed him. This is one of the earliest recorded deaths of an American football player due to injuries sustained during a game.

== Schedule ==
Date	Time	Opponent	Site	Result
October 19		at Penn Freshman	(Exhibition)	
October 20		at Hamilton School	49th and Baltimore; Philadelphia, PA	W 4–0
October 27		at Linden (Merchantville, NJ)		L 0–5
November 3		at Media Shortlidge Academy	Media, PA	L 0–6
November 13		Northeast Manual Training School		
November 24	4:00 pm	Bank Clerks' Association	A.C. of the Schuylkill Navy Grounds; Wayne Junction, PA	L 0–6

== Roster ==
1894 Drexel Dragons football team roster
Players
Coaches
Offense

Pos.	#	Name	Class
TE		Merrick
OT		Wetherill
G		McQueen
C		Kempton
G, FB		Stuart Heist
OT		Newberry
TE		N.D. Holbrook (C)
QB		Storm
HB		Shinn
HB		Glover
FB		Harry Knight (injured)
TE		Kerner
TE		Neats
OT		Bruner
G, OT		Waring
HB		Reeves
FB		Chapin

Defense

Pos.	#	Name	Class

Special teams

Pos.	#	Name	Class

Head coach

- No coach

Coordinators/assistant coaches

Legend

- (C) Team captain
- (S) Suspended
- (I) Ineligible
- Injured
- Redshirt

Roster
Last update: 17 October 2018
