= George H. Bond =

American football player, coach, and lawyer (1873–1954)

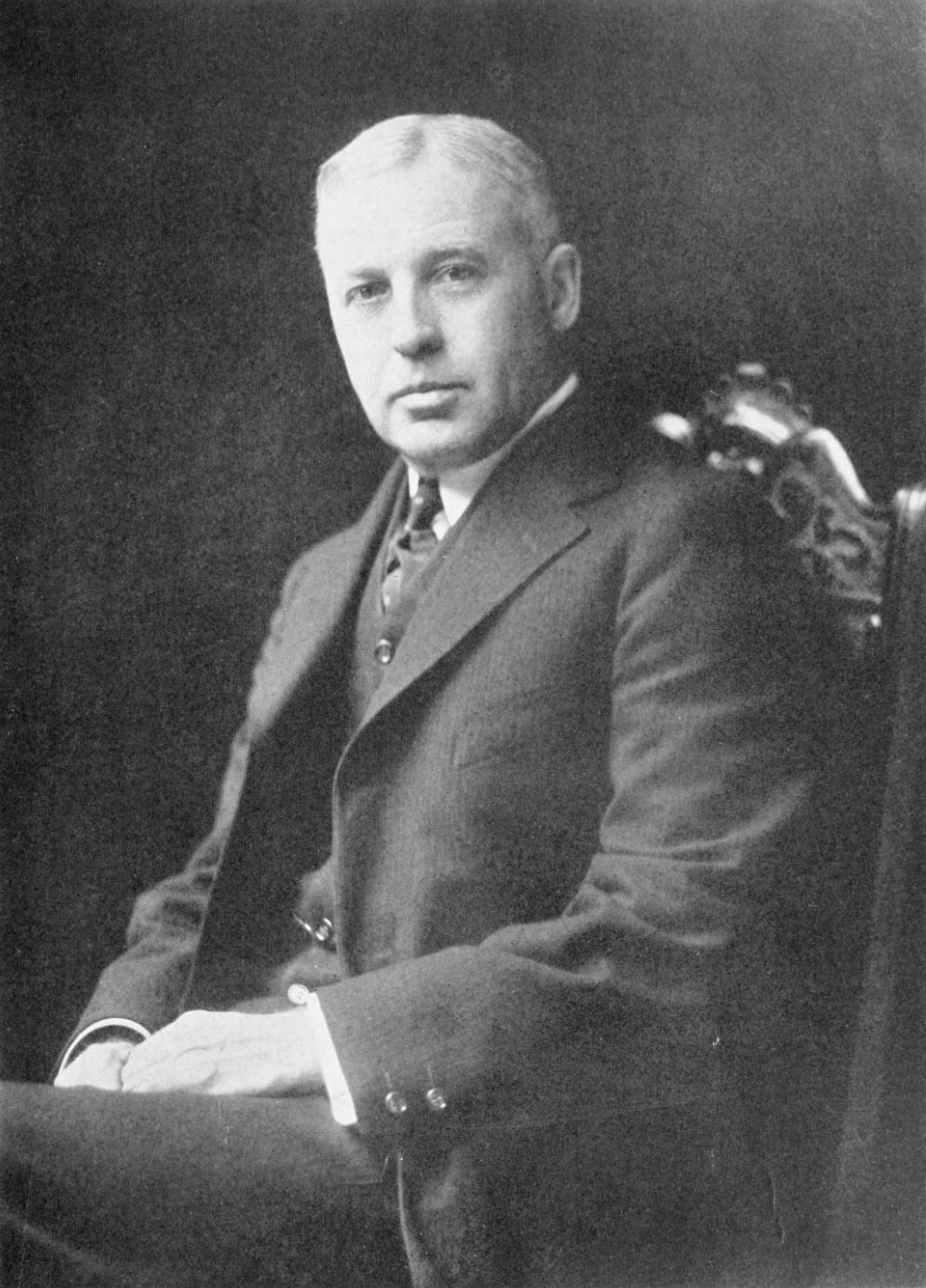

Biographical details
- Born: August 10, 1873; Syracuse, New York, U.S.
- Died: May 8, 1954 (aged 79); Syracuse, New York, U.S.

Playing career
- 1891: Syracuse
- 1893–1894: Syracuse

Coaching career (HC unless noted)
- 1894: Syracuse

Head coaching record
- Overall: 6–5

Signature
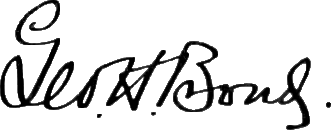

George Hopkins Bond (August 10, 1873 – May 8, 1954) was an American college football player and coach and lawyer. He served as the head football coach at Syracuse University for one season in 1894, compiling a record of 6–5.

== Biography ==
Bond was born in Syracuse, New York, on August 10, 1873. He graduated from Syracuse University with a bachelor's degree in philosophy in 1894 and from Syracuse University College of Law in 1897. Bond was a senior partner in the law firm of Bond, Schoeneck & King until his resignation in 1953. In 1937 he served as president of the New York State Bar Association. He was also an organizer and president of the New York State Association of District Attorneys.

Bond died at his home in Syracuse on May 8, 1954.

== Head coaching record ==
Year	Team	Overall	Conference	Standing	Bowl/playoffs
Syracuse Orangemen (Independent) (1894)
1894	Syracuse	6–5			
Syracuse:		6–5			
Total:		6–5			
