= 1894 Carlisle Indians football team =

American college football season

1894 Carlisle Indians football
- Conference: Independent
- Record: 1–6–2
- Head coach: Vance C. McCormick (1st season)
- Captain: Bejamin Caswell

1894 Eastern college football independents records
	Conf.			Overall
Team	W	L	T	W		L		T
Yale		–		16	–	0	–	0
Penn		–		12	–	0	–	0
Villanova		–		1	–	0	–	0
Penn State		–		6	–	0	–	1
Harvard		–		11	–	2	–	0
Geneva		–		5	–	1	–	0
Princeton		–		8	–	2	–	0
Temple		–		4	–	1	–	0
Holy Ghost College		–		7	–	2	–	1
Washington & Jefferson		–		5	–	2	–	1
Brown		–		10	–	5	–	0
Bucknell		–		5	–	3	–	0
Colgate		–		2	–	1	–	1
Army		–		3	–	2	–	0
Franklin & Marshall		–		6	–	4	–	0
Cornell		–		6	–	4	–	1
Trinity (CT)		–		4	–	3	–	0
Syracuse		–		6	–	5	–	0
Tufts		–		6	–	5	–	0
Massachusetts		–		3	–	3	–	0
Swarthmore		–		5	–	5	–	0
Western Univ. Penn		–		1	–	1	–	0
Lafayette		–		5	–	6	–	0
New Hampshire		–		2	–	3	–	0
Rutgers		–		4	–	6	–	0
Lehigh		–		5	–	9	–	0
Drexel		–		1	–	3	–	0
MIT		–		1	–	4	–	0
Boston College		–		1	–	6	–	0
Carlisle		–		1	–	8	–	0
Buffalo		–		0	–	2	–	0
NYU		–		0	–	3	–	0
Wesleyan		–		0	–	5	–	0

The 1894 Carlisle Indians football team represented the Carlisle Indian Industrial School as an independent during the 1894 college football season. Led by first-year head coach Vance C. McCormick, the Indians compiled a record of 1–6–2.

== Schedule ==
Date	Time	Opponent	Site	Result	Attendance	Source
October 6		at Harrisburg High School	Harrisburg, PA	W 14–0		
October 13		vs. Dickinson	Carlisle, PA	T 12–12	500	
October 20		at Lehigh	South Bethlehem, PA	L 12–22		
October 31		at Navy	Worden Field; Annapolis, MD	L 0–8		
November 3		at Franklin & Marshall	Lancaster, PA	L 18–28		
November 10	2:30 p.m.	at Bucknell	Bucknell campus; Lewisburg, PA	L 0–10	1,000	
November 17		at Pittsburgh Athletic Club	PAC Park; Pittsburgh, PA	L 0–8		
November 24	4:00 p.m.	at Columbia Athletic Club	National Park; Washington DC	L 0–18		
November 29		at York YMCA	YMCA grounds; York, PA	T 6–6	1,500	

== Roster ==
Joseph Irwin (Gros Ventre, Hidatsa), Charles Buck (Piegan), Martin Wheelock (Oneida), Bemus Pierce (Seneca), George Shelafo (Chippewa), David McFarland (Nez Perce), Delos Lone Wolf (Kiowa), Benjamin American Horse (Sioux), Harvey Warner (Omaha), Harrison Printup (Tuscarora), Antoine Donnell (Chippewa), Thomas Schanandore (Oneida), Jonas Metoxen (Oneida), Bejamin Caswell (Chippewa), Anthony Austin (Piegan), Pressly Houk (Piegan)
