= 1894 Army Cadets football team =

American college football season

1894 Army Cadets football
- Conference: Independent
- Record: 3–2
- Head coach: Harmon S. Graves (1st season)
- Captain: Edward Leonard King
- Home stadium: The Plain

1894 Eastern college football independents records
	Conf.			Overall
Team	W	L	T	W		L		T
Yale		–		16	–	0	–	0
Penn		–		12	–	0	–	0
Villanova		–		1	–	0	–	0
Penn State		–		6	–	0	–	1
Harvard		–		11	–	2	–	0
Geneva		–		5	–	1	–	0
Princeton		–		8	–	2	–	0
Temple		–		4	–	1	–	0
Holy Ghost College		–		7	–	2	–	1
Washington & Jefferson		–		5	–	2	–	1
Brown		–		10	–	5	–	0
Bucknell		–		5	–	3	–	0
Colgate		–		2	–	1	–	1
Army		–		3	–	2	–	0
Franklin & Marshall		–		6	–	4	–	0
Cornell		–		6	–	4	–	1
Trinity (CT)		–		4	–	3	–	0
Syracuse		–		6	–	5	–	0
Tufts		–		6	–	5	–	0
Massachusetts		–		3	–	3	–	0
Swarthmore		–		5	–	5	–	0
Western Univ. Penn		–		1	–	1	–	0
Lafayette		–		5	–	6	–	0
New Hampshire		–		2	–	3	–	0
Rutgers		–		4	–	6	–	0
Lehigh		–		5	–	9	–	0
Drexel		–		1	–	3	–	0
MIT		–		1	–	4	–	0
Boston College		–		1	–	6	–	0
Carlisle		–		1	–	8	–	0
Buffalo		–		0	–	2	–	0
NYU		–		0	–	3	–	0
Wesleyan		–		0	–	5	–	0

The 1894 Army Cadets football team represented the United States Military Academy as an independent during the 1894 college football season. In their first season under head coach Harmon S. Graves, the Cadets compiled a 3–2 record and outscored their opponents by a combined total of 95 to 22. The Army–Navy Game was not played in 1894.

No Army Cadets were honored on the 1894 College Football All-America Team.

== Schedule ==
Date	Time	Opponent	Site	Result	Attendance	Source
October 6	3:15 p.m.	Amherst	The Plain; West Point, NY	W 18–0	600	
October 13	3:30 p.m.	Brown	The Plain; West Point, NY	L 0–10		
October 20		MIT	The Plain; West Point, NY	W 42–0		
October 27		Yale	The Plain; West Point, NY	L 5–12	6,000	
November 3		Union (NY)	The Plain; West Point, NY	W 30–0		
