= 1894 Colgate football team =

American college football season

1894 Colgate football
- Conference: Independent
- Record: 2–1–1
- Head coach: Spencer Ford (1st season)
- Captain: Spencer Ford

1894 Eastern college football independents records
	Conf.			Overall
Team	W	L	T	W		L		T
Yale		–		16	–	0	–	0
Penn		–		12	–	0	–	0
Villanova		–		1	–	0	–	0
Penn State		–		6	–	0	–	1
Harvard		–		11	–	2	–	0
Geneva		–		5	–	1	–	0
Princeton		–		8	–	2	–	0
Temple		–		4	–	1	–	0
Holy Ghost College		–		7	–	2	–	1
Washington & Jefferson		–		5	–	2	–	1
Brown		–		10	–	5	–	0
Bucknell		–		5	–	3	–	0
Colgate		–		2	–	1	–	1
Army		–		3	–	2	–	0
Franklin & Marshall		–		6	–	4	–	0
Cornell		–		6	–	4	–	1
Trinity (CT)		–		4	–	3	–	0
Syracuse		–		6	–	5	–	0
Tufts		–		6	–	5	–	0
Massachusetts		–		3	–	3	–	0
Swarthmore		–		5	–	5	–	0
Western Univ. Penn		–		1	–	1	–	0
Lafayette		–		5	–	6	–	0
New Hampshire		–		2	–	3	–	0
Rutgers		–		4	–	6	–	0
Lehigh		–		5	–	9	–	0
Drexel		–		1	–	3	–	0
MIT		–		1	–	4	–	0
Boston College		–		1	–	6	–	0
Carlisle		–		1	–	8	–	0
Buffalo		–		0	–	2	–	0
NYU		–		0	–	3	–	0
Wesleyan		–		0	–	5	–	0

The 1894 Colgate football team represented Colgate University in the 1894 college football season. The team captain for the 1894 season was Spencer Ford.

== Schedule ==
Date	Time	Opponent	Site	Result	Source
October 6		Syracuse	Hamilton, NY (rivalry)	W 32–8	
October 13		St. Lawrence	Hamilton, NY	W 66–0	
October 20		at St. John's Military Academy	Manlius, NY	T 6–6	
October 27	3:00 p.m.	vs. Bucknell	Scranton baseball park; Scranton, PA	L 8–12	
