= 1894 Penn State football team =

American college football season

1894 Penn State football
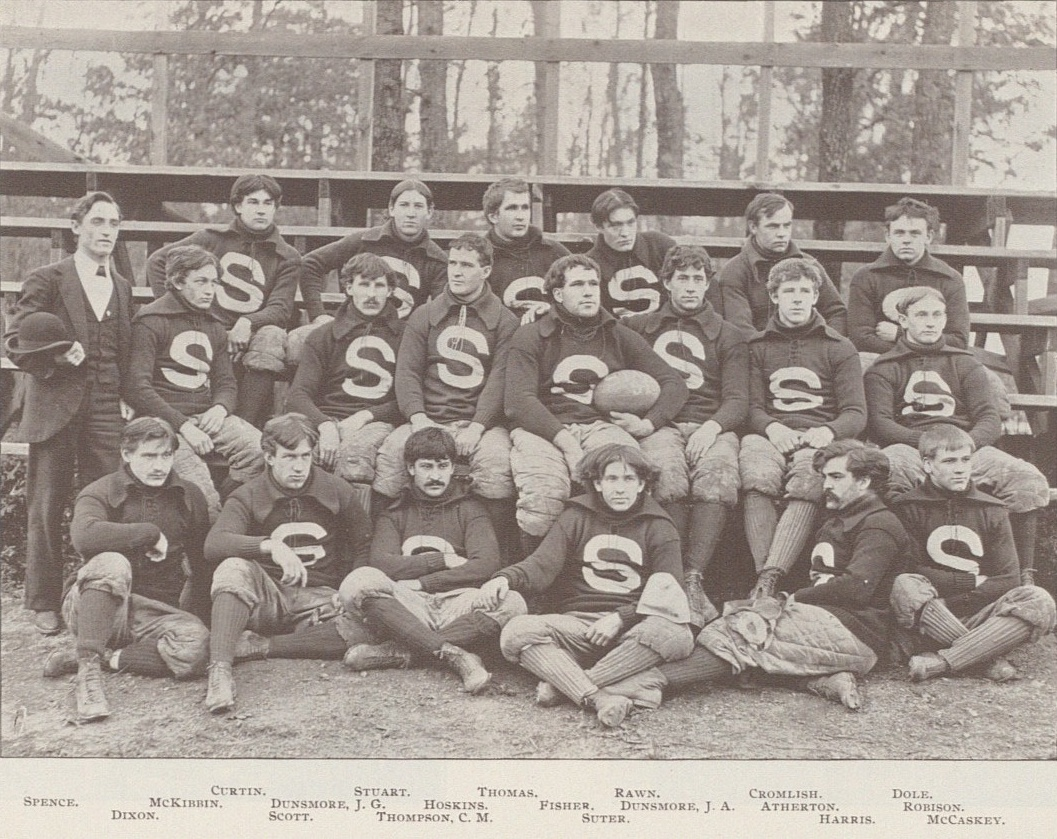
- Conference: Independent
- Record: 6–0–1
- Head coach: George W. Hoskins (3rd season)
- Captain: Benjamin Fisher
- Home stadium: Beaver Field

1894 Eastern college football independents records
	Conf.			Overall
Team	W	L	T	W		L		T
Yale		–		16	–	0	–	0
Penn		–		12	–	0	–	0
Villanova		–		1	–	0	–	0
Penn State		–		6	–	0	–	1
Harvard		–		11	–	2	–	0
Geneva		–		5	–	1	–	0
Princeton		–		8	–	2	–	0
Temple		–		4	–	1	–	0
Holy Ghost College		–		7	–	2	–	1
Washington & Jefferson		–		5	–	2	–	1
Brown		–		10	–	5	–	0
Bucknell		–		5	–	3	–	0
Colgate		–		2	–	1	–	1
Army		–		3	–	2	–	0
Franklin & Marshall		–		6	–	4	–	0
Cornell		–		6	–	4	–	1
Trinity (CT)		–		4	–	3	–	0
Syracuse		–		6	–	5	–	0
Tufts		–		6	–	5	–	0
Massachusetts		–		3	–	3	–	0
Swarthmore		–		5	–	5	–	0
Western Univ. Penn		–		1	–	1	–	0
Lafayette		–		5	–	6	–	0
New Hampshire		–		2	–	3	–	0
Rutgers		–		4	–	6	–	0
Lehigh		–		5	–	9	–	0
Drexel		–		1	–	3	–	0
MIT		–		1	–	4	–	0
Boston College		–		1	–	6	–	0
Carlisle		–		1	–	8	–	0
Buffalo		–		0	–	2	–	0
NYU		–		0	–	3	–	0
Wesleyan		–		0	–	5	–	0

The 1894 Penn State football team was an American football team that represented Pennsylvania State College—now known as Pennsylvania State University–as an independent during the 1894 college football season. The team was coached by George W. Hoskins and played its home games on Beaver Field in University Park, Pennsylvania.

== Schedule ==
Date	Opponent	Site	Result	Attendance	Source
October 13	Gettysburg	Beaver Field; State College, PA	W 60–0		
October 20	Lafayette	Beaver Field; State College, PA	W 72–0		
November 10	at Navy	Worden Field; Annapolis, MD	T 6–6		
November 17	vs. Bucknell	Athletic Park; Williamsport, PA	W 12–6	2,000	
November 23	at Washington & Jefferson	Washington, PA	W 6–0		
November 24	at Oberlin	Oberlin, OH	W 9–6		
November 29	at Pittsburgh Athletic Club	Pittsburgh, PA	W 14–0		
