= 1894 Syracuse Orangemen football team =

American college football season

1894 Syracuse Orangemen football
- Conference: Independent
- Record: 6–5
- Head coach: George H. Bond (1st season)
- Captain: Robert Adams
- Home stadium: Star Park

1894 Eastern college football independents records
| | Conf. | | | Overall |
| Team | W | L | T | W | | L | | T |
|---|---|---|---|---|---|---|---|---|
| Yale | | – | | 16 | – | 0 | – | 0 |
| Penn | | – | | 12 | – | 0 | – | 0 |
| Villanova | | – | | 1 | – | 0 | – | 0 |
| Penn State | | – | | 6 | – | 0 | – | 1 |
| Harvard | | – | | 11 | – | 2 | – | 0 |
| Geneva | | – | | 5 | – | 1 | – | 0 |
| Princeton | | – | | 8 | – | 2 | – | 0 |
| Temple | | – | | 4 | – | 1 | – | 0 |
| Holy Ghost College | | – | | 7 | – | 2 | – | 1 |
| Washington & Jefferson | | – | | 5 | – | 2 | – | 1 |
| Brown | | – | | 10 | – | 5 | – | 0 |
| Bucknell | | – | | 5 | – | 3 | – | 0 |
| Colgate | | – | | 2 | – | 1 | – | 1 |
| Army | | – | | 3 | – | 2 | – | 0 |
| Franklin & Marshall | | – | | 6 | – | 4 | – | 0 |
| Cornell | | – | | 6 | – | 4 | – | 1 |
| Trinity (CT) | | – | | 4 | – | 3 | – | 0 |
| Syracuse | | – | | 6 | – | 5 | – | 0 |
| Tufts | | – | | 6 | – | 5 | – | 0 |
| Massachusetts | | – | | 3 | – | 3 | – | 0 |
| Swarthmore | | – | | 5 | – | 5 | – | 0 |
| Western Univ. Penn | | – | | 1 | – | 1 | – | 0 |
| Lafayette | | – | | 5 | – | 6 | – | 0 |
| New Hampshire | | – | | 2 | – | 3 | – | 0 |
| Rutgers | | – | | 4 | – | 6 | – | 0 |
| Lehigh | | – | | 5 | – | 9 | – | 0 |
| Drexel | | – | | 1 | – | 3 | – | 0 |
| MIT | | – | | 1 | – | 4 | – | 0 |
| Boston College | | – | | 1 | – | 6 | – | 0 |
| Carlisle | | – | | 1 | – | 8 | – | 0 |
| Buffalo | | – | | 0 | – | 2 | – | 0 |
| NYU | | – | | 0 | – | 3 | – | 0 |
| Wesleyan | | – | | 0 | – | 5 | – | 0 |

The 1894 Syracuse Orangemen football team represented Syracuse University as an independent during the 1894 college football season. Led George H. Bond in his first and only season as head coach, the Orangemen compiled a record of 6–5.

== Schedule ==
| Date | Opponent | Site | Result | Source |
|---|---|---|---|---|
| September 26 | at Cornell | Ithaca, NY | L 0–39 | |
| September 29 | Hobart | Syracuse, NY | W 18–4 | |
| October 6 | at Colgate | Hamilton, NY (rivalry) | L 8–32 | |
| October 13 | Cornell B team | Syracuse, NY | W 22–0 | |
| October 20 | Syracuse Athletic Association | Syracuse, NY | L 6–10 | |
| November 3 | Cazenovia | Syracuse, NY | W 20–0 | |
| November 6 | St. John's Military Academy | Syracuse, NY | W 20–12 | |
| November 10 | at Rochester | Rochester, NY | W 28–18 | |
| November 17 | Hamilton | Syracuse, NY | W 50–0 | |
| November 21 | Union (NY) | Syracuse, NY | L 10–20 | |
| November 24 | St. John's Military Academy | Syracuse, NY | L 6–22 | |
