= 1894 Harvard Crimson football team =

American college football season

1894 Harvard Crimson football
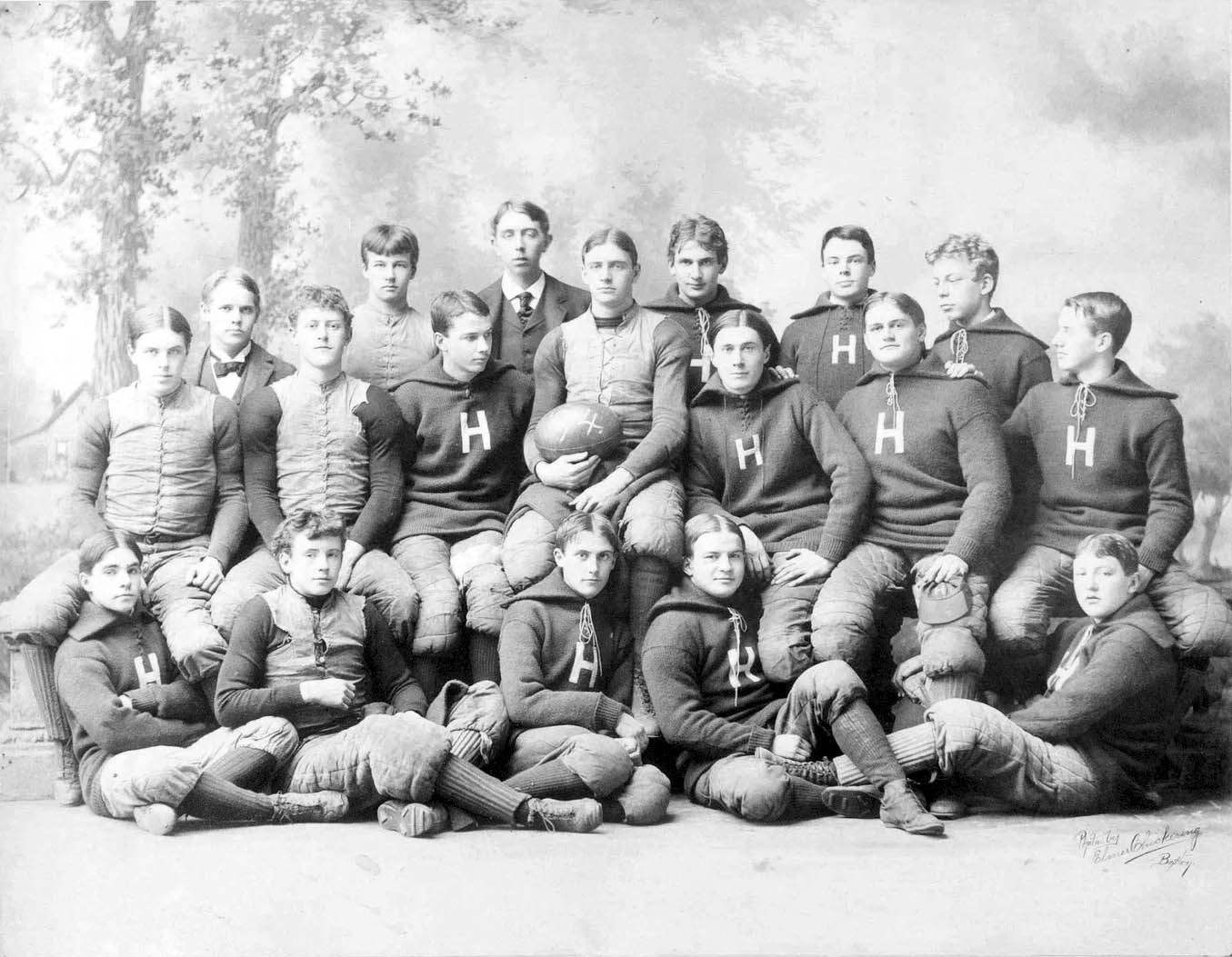
- Conference: Independent
- Record: 11–2
- Head coach: William A. Brooks (1st season)
- Home stadium: Soldiers' Field

1894 Eastern college football independents records
	Conf.			Overall
Team	W	L	T	W		L		T
Yale		–		16	–	0	–	0
Penn		–		12	–	0	–	0
Villanova		–		1	–	0	–	0
Penn State		–		6	–	0	–	1
Harvard		–		11	–	2	–	0
Geneva		–		5	–	1	–	0
Princeton		–		8	–	2	–	0
Temple		–		4	–	1	–	0
Holy Ghost College		–		7	–	2	–	1
Washington & Jefferson		–		5	–	2	–	1
Brown		–		10	–	5	–	0
Bucknell		–		5	–	3	–	0
Colgate		–		2	–	1	–	1
Army		–		3	–	2	–	0
Franklin & Marshall		–		6	–	4	–	0
Cornell		–		6	–	4	–	1
Amherst		–		7	–	5	–	0
Trinity (CT)		–		4	–	3	–	0
Syracuse		–		6	–	5	–	0
Tufts		–		6	–	5	–	0
Massachusetts		–		3	–	3	–	0
Swarthmore		–		5	–	5	–	0
Western Univ. Penn		–		1	–	1	–	0
Lafayette		–		5	–	6	–	0
New Hampshire		–		2	–	3	–	0
Rutgers		–		4	–	6	–	0
Lehigh		–		5	–	9	–	0
Williams		–		1	–	3	–	0
Drexel		–		1	–	3	–	0
MIT		–		1	–	4	–	0
Boston College		–		1	–	6	–	0
Carlisle		–		1	–	8	–	0
Buffalo		–		0	–	2	–	0
NYU		–		0	–	3	–	0
Wesleyan		–		0	–	5	–	0

The 1894 Harvard Crimson football team represented Harvard University as an independent during the 1894 college football season. The team finished with an 11–2 record under first-year head coach William A. Brooks. The team won its first 11 games by a combined total of 326 to 16, but lost the final two games to Yale (4–12) and Penn (4–18).

One of the largest crowds to see a game at Pennsylvania's University Athletic Grounds was on November 29, 1894; temporary stands were erected and more than 20,000 fans of both schools filled the ballpark to see Penn defeat Harvard 18–4.

Harvard tackle Bert Waters was a consensus first-team All-American.

== Schedule ==
Date	Time	Opponent	Site	Result	Attendance	Source
September 29	3:30 p.m.	Dartmouth	Soldiers' Field; Boston, MA (rivalry)	W 22–0	2,000–3,000	
October 3		Phillips Exeter	Soldiers' Field; Boston, MA	W 48–0	500	
October 6		Andover	Soldiers' Field; Boston, MA	W 46–0	1,200	
October 11	4:00 p.m.	Brown	Soldiers' Field; Boston, MA	W 18–4	2,000	
October 13		Orange Athletic Club	Soldiers' Field; Boston, MA	W 14–0	300	
October 17		Amherst	Soldiers' Field; Boston, MA	W 30–0	1,500	
October 20		Williams	Soldiers' Field; Boston, MA	W 32–0	3,500–4,000	
October 27		vs. Cornell	Manhattan Field; New York, NY	W 22–12	8,000	
November 1		Boston Athletic Association	Soldiers' Field; Boston, MA	W 40–0	2,000	
November 10		Chicago Athletic Association	Soldiers' Field; Boston, MA	W 36–0	3,500	
November 15	3:30 p.m.	Brown	Soldiers' Field; Boston, MA	W 18–0	4,000–5,000	
November 24		vs. Yale	Hampden Park; Springfield, MA (rivalry)	L 4–12	23,000	
November 29	3:00 p.m.	at Penn	University Athletic Grounds; Philadelphia, PA (rivalry)	L 4–18	23,000	

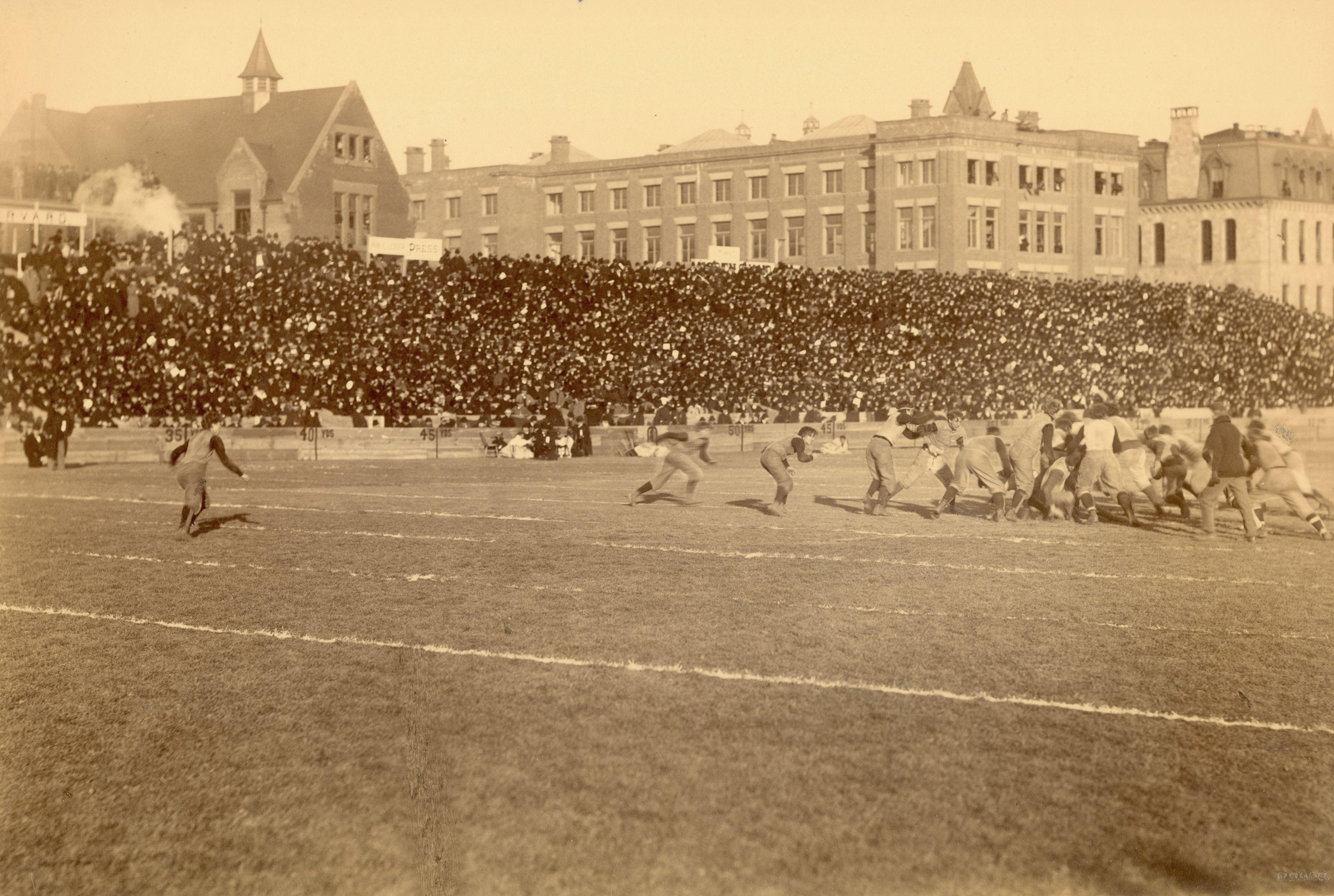
Pennsylvania-Harvard at University Athletic Grounds (November 29, 1894)
