= 1894 Massachusetts Aggies football team =

American college football season

1894 Massachusetts Aggies football
- Conference: Independent
- Record: 3–3
- Head coach: None
- Home stadium: Alumni Field

1894 Eastern college football independents records
	Conf.			Overall
Team	W	L	T	W		L		T
Yale		–		16	–	0	–	0
Penn		–		12	–	0	–	0
Villanova		–		1	–	0	–	0
Penn State		–		6	–	0	–	1
Harvard		–		11	–	2	–	0
Geneva		–		5	–	1	–	0
Princeton		–		8	–	2	–	0
Temple		–		4	–	1	–	0
Holy Ghost College		–		7	–	2	–	1
Washington & Jefferson		–		5	–	2	–	1
Brown		–		10	–	5	–	0
Bucknell		–		5	–	3	–	0
Colgate		–		2	–	1	–	1
Army		–		3	–	2	–	0
Franklin & Marshall		–		6	–	4	–	0
Cornell		–		6	–	4	–	1
Amherst		–		7	–	5	–	0
Trinity (CT)		–		4	–	3	–	0
Syracuse		–		6	–	5	–	0
Tufts		–		6	–	5	–	0
Massachusetts		–		3	–	3	–	0
Swarthmore		–		5	–	5	–	0
Western Univ. Penn		–		1	–	1	–	0
Lafayette		–		5	–	6	–	0
New Hampshire		–		2	–	3	–	0
Rutgers		–		4	–	6	–	0
Lehigh		–		5	–	9	–	0
Williams		–		1	–	3	–	0
Drexel		–		1	–	3	–	0
MIT		–		1	–	4	–	0
Boston College		–		1	–	6	–	0
Carlisle		–		1	–	8	–	0
Buffalo		–		0	–	2	–	0
NYU		–		0	–	3	–	0
Wesleyan		–		0	–	5	–	0

The 1894 Massachusetts Aggies football team represented Massachusetts Agricultural College in the 1894 college football season. The team played its home games at Alumni Field in Amherst, Massachusetts. Massachusetts finished the season with a record of 3–3.

== Schedule ==
Date	Opponent	Site	Result	Source
September 27	at Amherst	Pratt Field; Amherst, MA	L 0–6	
October 1	at Mount Hermon	Mount Hermon, MA	W 16–10	
October 6	at Trinity (CT)	Trinity grounds; Hartford, CT	L 0–10	
October 12	at Wesleyan	Andrus Field; Middletown, CT	W 10–0	
October 20	at Worcester Tech	Worcester, MA	L 0–44	
November 3	at Williston Seminary	Easthampton, MA	W 16–0	
