= William G. Norton =

American football player and coach

Biographical details
- Born: Waukegan, Illinois, U.S.
- Died: February 1895; Indian River, Florida, U.S.

Playing career
- 1889–1890: Dartmouth

Coaching career (HC unless noted)
- 1894: Brown

Head coaching record
- Overall: 10–5

William G. Norton (? – February 1895) was an American college football coach. He attended Dartmouth College, where he competed in track and field, baseball, and earned varsity letters in football in 1889 and 1890. In 1890, The New York Times wrote of Norton: "it is safe to say there will not be a better second baseman in the Triangular League. He batted fairly well last year, and has improved much since the first championship game last Spring." He graduated from Dartmouth in 1890, and then attended Yale Law School.

In 1894, Norton coached the Brown University football team and amassed a record of 10–5. In November 1894, Norton left Providence, Rhode Island for Florida. His burnt body was discovered on February 3, 1895, in a cabin on the Indian River, an apparent victim of murder.

== Head coaching record ==
Year	Team	Overall	Conference	Standing	Bowl/playoffs
Brown Bears (Independent) (1894)
1894	Brown	10–5			
Brown:		10–5			
Total:		10–5			
