= 1894 Yale Bulldogs football team =

American college football season

1894 Yale Bulldogs football
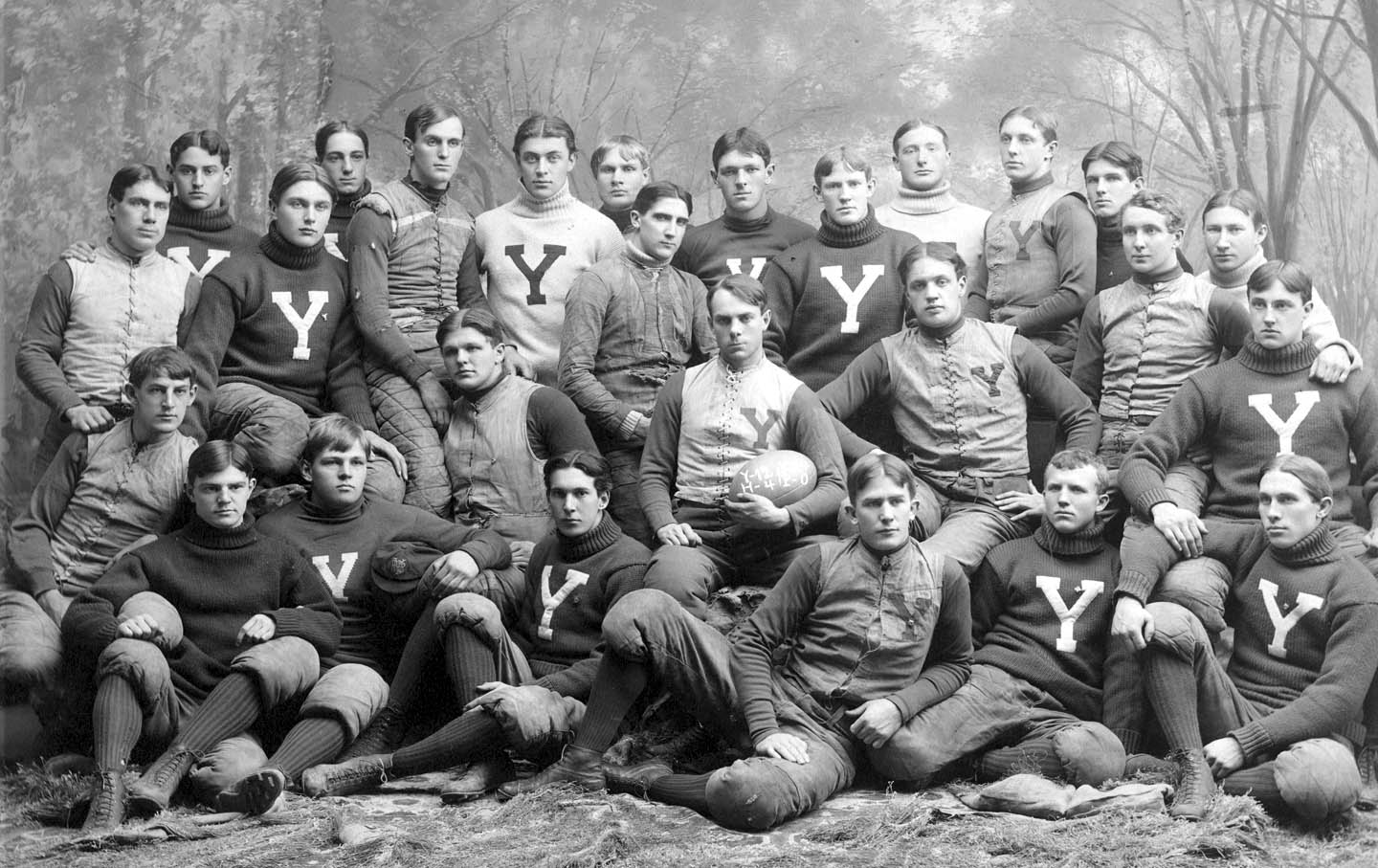

National champion (Billingsley, Helms, NCF) Co-national champion (Davis)
- Conference: Independent
- Record: 16–0
- Head coach: William Rhodes (2nd season)
- Captain: Frank Hinkey
- Home stadium: Yale Field

1894 Eastern college football independents records
	Conf.			Overall
Team	W	L	T	W		L		T
Yale		–		16	–	0	–	0
Penn		–		12	–	0	–	0
Villanova		–		1	–	0	–	0
Penn State		–		6	–	0	–	1
Harvard		–		11	–	2	–	0
Geneva		–		5	–	1	–	0
Princeton		–		8	–	2	–	0
Temple		–		4	–	1	–	0
Holy Ghost College		–		7	–	2	–	1
Washington & Jefferson		–		5	–	2	–	1
Brown		–		10	–	5	–	0
Bucknell		–		5	–	3	–	0
Colgate		–		2	–	1	–	1
Army		–		3	–	2	–	0
Franklin & Marshall		–		6	–	4	–	0
Cornell		–		6	–	4	–	1
Amherst		–		7	–	5	–	0
Trinity (CT)		–		4	–	3	–	0
Syracuse		–		6	–	5	–	0
Tufts		–		6	–	5	–	0
Massachusetts		–		3	–	3	–	0
Swarthmore		–		5	–	5	–	0
Western Univ. Penn		–		1	–	1	–	0
Lafayette		–		5	–	6	–	0
New Hampshire		–		2	–	3	–	0
Rutgers		–		4	–	6	–	0
Lehigh		–		5	–	9	–	0
Williams		–		1	–	3	–	0
Drexel		–		1	–	3	–	0
MIT		–		1	–	4	–	0
Boston College		–		1	–	6	–	0
Carlisle		–		1	–	8	–	0
Buffalo		–		0	–	2	–	0
NYU		–		0	–	3	–	0
Wesleyan		–		0	–	5	–	0

The 1894 Yale Bulldogs football team was an American football team that represented Yale University as an independent during the 1894 college football season. The team finished with a 16–0 record, shut out 13 of 16 opponents, and outscored all opponents by a total of 485 to 13. William Rhodes was the head coach, and Frank Hinkey was the team captain.

There was no contemporaneous system in 1894 for determining a national champion. However, Yale was retroactively named as the national champion by the Billingsley Report, Helms Athletic Foundation, and National Championship Foundation, and as a co-national champion by Parke H. Davis.

Five Yale players were selected as consensus first-team players on the 1894 All-America team. The team's consensus All-Americans were: quarterback George Adee, fullback Frank Butterworth, end Frank Hinkey, center Phillip Stillman, and guard Bill Hickok.

The Bulldogs' 16–0 record was not matched again at any level of college football until 125 years later when North Dakota State won the 2019 FCS National Championship. In 2026, Indiana matched the record in the CFP National Championship with a victory over Miami (FL) for its first national championship.

== Schedule ==
Date	Time	Opponent	Site	Result	Attendance	Source
September 29		at Trinity (CT)	Trinity grounds; Hartford, CT	W 42–0	600	
October 3		Brown	Yale Field; New Haven, CT	W 28–0	2,500	
October 6		at Crescent Athletic Club	Eastern Park; Brooklyn, NY	W 10–0	3,000	
October 10		Williams	Yale Field; New Haven, CT	W 23–4	75	
October 13		Lehigh	Yale Field; New Haven, CT	W 34–0		
October 17		vs. Dartmouth	Hampden Park; Springfield, MA	W 34–0	700	
October 20		at Orange Athletic Club	Orange Oval; East Orange, NJ	W 24–0	2,500	
October 24		Boston Athletic Association	Yale Field; New Haven, CT	W 23–0		
October 27		at Army	The Plain; West Point, NY	W 12–5	6,000	
October 31		Volunteer (NY) Athletic Association	Yale Field; New Haven, CT	W 42–0		
November 3	3:15 p.m.	at Brown	Adelaide Park; Providence, RI	W 12–0	5,000	
November 7		Tufts	Yale Field; New Haven, CT	W 67–0		
November 10		vs. Lehigh	Polo Grounds; New York, NY	W 50–0		
November 14		Chicago Athletic Association	Yale Field; New Haven, CT	W 48–0	1,500	
November 24		vs. Harvard	Hampden Park; Springfield, MA (rivalry)	W 12–4	23,000	
December 1	2:08 p.m.	vs. Princeton	Manhattan Field; New York, NY (rivalry)	W 24–0	20,000–30,000	

== Roster ==
- George Adee, QB
- Bill Armstrong, HB
- Anson M. Beard, C
- Lyman M. Bass, E
- Alexander Brown
- J. M. Brown, G
- Frank Butterworth, FB
- Charles Chadwick, T
- Harry P. Cross, C
- Alfred W. Dafer
- Clarence DeWitt, HB
- Feeter, T
- Clarence Fincke, QB
- Gerens, FB
- Gillette, HB
- John Campbell Greenway, E
- George B. Hatch, E
- Bill Hickok, G
- Ross A. Hickok
- Louis Hinckey, E
- Frank Hinkey, E
- Alexander Jerrems, HB
- Judd, T
- Harold W. Letton, FB
- Marks, HB
- James A. McCrea, G
- Paul D. Mills, FB
- Charles S. Morris, QB
- Fred T. Murphy, T
- Pond, HB
- George O. Redington, FB
- James O. Rodgers, T
- Phillip Stillman, C
- Dudley Sutphin, T
- Sam Thorne, FB
- Whitcomb, T
