= Spencer Ford (American football) =

American football player and coach (1866–1927)

Biographical details
- Born: November 21, 1866; Camden, New York, U.S.
- Died: October 8, 1927 (aged 60); Camden, New York, U.S.
- Education: Colgate University (1898)

Playing career
- c. 1894: Colgate

Coaching career (HC unless noted)
- 1894: Colgate

Head coaching record
- Overall: 2–1–1

Spencer James Ford (November 21, 1866 – October 8, 1927) was an American college football player and coach. He was the third head football coach at Colgate University and he held that position for the 1894 season. His coaching record at Colgate was 2–1–1. He later lived in Astoria, Queens.

== Head coaching record ==
Year	Team	Overall	Conference	Standing	Bowl/playoffs
Colgate (Independent) (1894)
1894	Colgate	2–1–1			
Colgate:		2–1–1			
Total:		2–1–1			
