= 1894 Lehigh football team =

American college football season

1894 Lehigh football
- Conference: Independent
- Record: 5–9
- Head coach: Pudge Heffelfinger (1st season)

1894 Eastern college football independents records
	Conf.			Overall
Team	W	L	T	W		L		T
Yale		–		16	–	0	–	0
Penn		–		12	–	0	–	0
Villanova		–		1	–	0	–	0
Penn State		–		6	–	0	–	1
Harvard		–		11	–	2	–	0
Geneva		–		5	–	1	–	0
Princeton		–		8	–	2	–	0
Temple		–		4	–	1	–	0
Holy Ghost College		–		7	–	2	–	1
Washington & Jefferson		–		5	–	2	–	1
Brown		–		10	–	5	–	0
Bucknell		–		5	–	3	–	0
Colgate		–		2	–	1	–	1
Army		–		3	–	2	–	0
Frankin & Marshall		–		6	–	4	–	0
Cornell		–		6	–	4	–	1
Amherst		–		7	–	5	–	0
Trinity (CT)		–		4	–	3	–	0
Syracuse		–		6	–	5	–	0
Tufts		–		6	–	5	–	0
Massachusetts		–		3	–	3	–	0
Swarthmore		–		5	–	5	–	0
Western Univ. Penn		–		1	–	1	–	0
Lafayette		–		5	–	6	–	0
New Hampshire		–		2	–	3	–	0
Rutgers		–		4	–	6	–	0
Lehigh		–		5	–	9	–	0
Williams		–		1	–	3	–	0
Drexel		–		1	–	3	–	0
MIT		–		1	–	4	–	0
Boston College		–		1	–	6	–	0
Carlisle		–		1	–	8	–	0
Buffalo		–		0	–	2	–	0
NYU		–		0	–	3	–	0
Wesleyan		–		0	–	5	–	0

The 1894 Lehigh football team was an American football team that represented Lehigh University as an independent during the 1894 college football season. In its first and only season under head coach Pudge Heffelfinger, the team compiled a 5–9 record and was outscored by a total of 242 to 120.

== Schedule ==
Date	Opponent	Site	Result	Attendance	Source
September 29	Rutgers	South Bethlehem, PA	W 24–0		
October 6	Princeton	South Bethlehem, PA	L 0–8		
October 10	Swarthmore	South Bethlehem, PA	W 33–0		
October 13	at Yale	Yale Field; New Haven, CT	L 0–34		
October 17	at Penn	Philadelphia, PA	L 0–30		
October 20	Carlisle	South Bethlehem, PA	W 22–12		
October 24	at Princeton	Princeton, NJ	L 0–32	900	
October 27	at Orange Athletic Club	Orange Oval; East Orange, NJ	L 0–14	1,200–1,500	
October 31	North Carolina	South Bethlehem, PA	W 24–6		
November 3	at Navy	Worden Field; Annapolis, MD	L 0–10	2,000	
November 10	vs. Yale	Polo Grounds; New York, NY	L 0–50		
November 14	at Lafayette	Easton, PA (rivalry)	L 0–28		
November 24	Lafayette	South Bethlehem, PA	W 11–8		
November 29	at Cornell	Percy Field; Ithaca, NY	L 6–10		
