= 1894 Princeton Tigers football team =

American college football season

1894 Princeton Tigers football

National champion (Houlgate)
- Conference: Independent
- Record: 8–2
- Head coach: None
- Captain: Thomas Trenchard

1894 Eastern college football independents records
	Conf.			Overall
Team	W	L	T	W		L		T
Yale		–		16	–	0	–	0
Penn		–		12	–	0	–	0
Villanova		–		1	–	0	–	0
Penn State		–		6	–	0	–	1
Harvard		–		11	–	2	–	0
Geneva		–		5	–	1	–	0
Princeton		–		8	–	2	–	0
Temple		–		4	–	1	–	0
Holy Ghost College		–		7	–	2	–	1
Washington & Jefferson		–		5	–	2	–	1
Brown		–		10	–	5	–	0
Bucknell		–		5	–	3	–	0
Colgate		–		2	–	1	–	1
Army		–		3	–	2	–	0
Frankin & Marshall		–		6	–	4	–	0
Cornell		–		6	–	4	–	1
Amherst		–		7	–	5	–	0
Trinity (CT)		–		4	–	3	–	0
Syracuse		–		6	–	5	–	0
Tufts		–		6	–	5	–	0
Massachusetts		–		3	–	3	–	0
Swarthmore		–		5	–	5	–	0
Western Univ. Penn		–		1	–	1	–	0
Lafayette		–		5	–	6	–	0
New Hampshire		–		2	–	3	–	0
Rutgers		–		4	–	6	–	0
Lehigh		–		5	–	9	–	0
Williams		–		1	–	3	–	0
Drexel		–		1	–	3	–	0
MIT		–		1	–	4	–	0
Boston College		–		1	–	6	–	0
Carlisle		–		1	–	8	–	0
Buffalo		–		0	–	2	–	0
NYU		–		0	–	3	–	0
Wesleyan		–		0	–	5	–	0

The 1894 Princeton Tigers football team was an American football team representing Princeton University as an independent during the 1894 college football season. The team compiled an 8–2 record, shut out six of ten opponents, and outscored all opponents by a total of 208 to 44. Thomas Trenchard was the team captain.

There was no contemporaneous system in 1894 for determining a national champion. However, Princeton was retroactively named as the national champion by one selector, the Houlgate System. Most of the other selectors chose Yale (16–0 record) as the national champion for 1894. Yale also defeated Princeton in head-to-head competition.

Two Princeton players, tackle Langdon Lea and guard Art Wheeler, were selected as consensus first-team players on the 1894 All-America team. Lea and Wheeler were both later inducted into the College Football Hall of Fame.

== Schedule ==
Date	Time	Opponent	Site	Result	Attendance	Source
September 29		Lafayette	Princeton, NJ	W 40–0	3,000	
October 6		at Lehigh	South Bethlehem, PA	W 8–0		
October 10		Rutgers	Princeton, NJ (rivalry)	W 48–0		
October 15	2:00 p.m.	vs. Virginia	Catonsville Country Cub; Catonsville, MD	W 12–0		
October 20		vs. Cornell	Manhattan Field; New York, NY	W 12–4	5,000	
October 24		Lehigh	Princeton, NJ	W 32–0	900	
October 27		Volunteer (NY) Athletic Association	Princeton, NJ	W 34–0		
November 10		vs. Penn	State Fair Grounds; Trenton, NJ (rivalry)	L 0–12		
November 21		at Orange Athletic Club	Orange Oval; East Orange, NJ	W 16–4		
December 1	2:08 p.m.	vs. Yale	Manhattan Field; New York, NY (rivalry)	L 0–24	20,000–30,000	

== Roster ==
- Andrus, T
- Armstrong, T
- H. W. Barnett, HB
- H. O. Brown, E
- Burt, FB
- William W. Church, T
- Garrett Cochran, E
- Eddie Crowdis, C
- Dorr, HB
- David Farragut Edwards, FB
- Hearn, HB
- Augustus Holly, T
- Gordon Johnston, E
- Langdon Lea, T
- McCormick, HB
- Moore, HB
- Franklin Morse, QB
- Neilson Poe, QB
- Howard R. Reiter, HB
- William Ayres Reynolds, QB
- Rhodes, G
- Dudley Riggs, C
- Rosengarten, HB
- Sloan, FB
- Smith, E
- Summers, G
- Knox Taylor, G
- Thompson, E
- Thomas Trenchard, QB
- Albert Tyler, HB
- Voorhis, HB
- William Ward, HB
- Art Wheeler, G
