= 1894 Williams Ephs football team =

American college football season

1894 Williams Ephs football
- Conference: Triangular Football League
- Record: 6–3–1 (1–1 TFL)
- Head coach: None
- Home stadium: Weston Field

1894 Triangular Football League standings
	Conf.					Overall
Team	W		L		T	W		L		T
Dartmouth $	2	–	0	–	0	5	–	4	–	0
Williams	1	–	1	–	0	6	–	3	–	1
Amherst	0	–	2	–	0	7	–	5	–	1
$ – Conference champion

The 1894 Williams Ephs football team represented the Williams College as a member of the Triangular Football League (TFL) during the 1894 college football season. Williams compiled an overall record of 6–3–1 with a mark of 1–1 in conference play, placing second in the TFL. The team played home games at Weston Field in Williamstown, Massachusetts.

== Schedule ==
Date	Opponent	Site	Result	Attendance	Source
October 3	Laureates of Troy*	Weston Field; Williamstown, MA	W 30–0	500	
October 10	at Yale*	Yale Field; New Haven, CT	L 4–23	75	
October 13	Union (NY)*	Weston Field; Williamstown, MA	W 20–0		
October 17	at Laureates of Troy*	Laureate grounds; Troy, NY	W 8–0		
October 20	at Harvard*	Soldiers' Field; Cambridge, MA	L 0–32	3,500–4,000	
October 27	vs. Union (NY)*	Ridgefield grounds; Albany, NY	W 4–0		
October 31	Boston Tech*	Weston Field; Williamstown, MA	W 12–0		
November 3	at Dartmouth	Hanover, NH	L 0–20	1,200	
November 10	vs. Cornell*	Ridgefield grounds; Albany, NY	T 0–0	2,000–3,000	
November 17	Amherst	Weston Field; Williamstown, MA (rivalry)	W 34–10	1,200	
*Non-conference game
