= 1894 Lafayette football team =

American college football season

1894 Lafayette football
- Conference: Independent
- Record: 5–6
- Head coach: Hugh Janeway (1st season)
- Captain: Samuel Jordan
- Home stadium: March Field

1894 Eastern college football independents records
	Conf.			Overall
Team	W	L	T	W		L		T
Yale		–		16	–	0	–	0
Penn		–		12	–	0	–	0
Villanova		–		1	–	0	–	0
Penn State		–		6	–	0	–	1
Harvard		–		11	–	2	–	0
Geneva		–		5	–	1	–	0
Princeton		–		8	–	2	–	0
Temple		–		4	–	1	–	0
Holy Ghost College		–		7	–	2	–	1
Washington & Jefferson		–		5	–	2	–	1
Brown		–		10	–	5	–	0
Bucknell		–		5	–	3	–	0
Colgate		–		2	–	1	–	1
Army		–		3	–	2	–	0
Franklin & Marshall		–		6	–	4	–	0
Cornell		–		6	–	4	–	1
Amherst		–		7	–	5	–	0
Trinity (CT)		–		4	–	3	–	0
Syracuse		–		6	–	5	–	0
Tufts		–		6	–	5	–	0
Massachusetts		–		3	–	3	–	0
Swarthmore		–		5	–	5	–	0
Western Univ. Penn		–		1	–	1	–	0
Lafayette		–		5	–	6	–	0
New Hampshire		–		2	–	3	–	0
Rutgers		–		4	–	6	–	0
Lehigh		–		5	–	9	–	0
Williams		–		1	–	3	–	0
Drexel		–		1	–	3	–	0
MIT		–		1	–	4	–	0
Boston College		–		1	–	6	–	0
Carlisle		–		1	–	8	–	0
Buffalo		–		0	–	2	–	0
NYU		–		0	–	3	–	0
Wesleyan		–		0	–	5	–	0

The 1894 Lafayette football team was an American football team that represented Lafayette College as an independent during the 1894 college football season. In its first season under head coach Hugh Janeway, the team compiled a 5–6 record. Samuel Jordan was the team captain. The team played its home games at March Field in Easton, Pennsylvania.

== Schedule ==
Date	Opponent	Site	Result	Attendance	Source
September 29	at Princeton	Princeton, NJ	L 0–40	3,000	
October 3	Gettysburg	Easton, PA	W 36–0		
October 6	at Rutgers	Neilson Field; New Brunswick, NJ	L 10–12		
October 13	at Cornell	Percy Field; Ithaca, NY	L 0–24		
October 20	at Penn State	Beaver Field; State College, PA	L 0–72		
October 24	Swarthmore	Easton, PA	W 46–0		
October 31	at Penn	Philadelphia, PA	L 0–26		
November 3	at Orange Athletic Club	Orange Oval; East Orange, NJ	W 18–6		
November 14	Lehigh	Easton, PA (rivalry)	W 28–0		
November 24	Lehigh	South Bethlehem, PA	L 8–11		
November 29	Bucknell	Easton, PA	W 44–0		
