= 1894 Penn Quakers football team =

American college football season

1894 Penn Quakers football

Co-national champion (Davis)
- Conference: Independent
- Record: 12–0
- Head coach: George Washington Woodruff (3rd season)
- Captain: Alden Knipe
- Home stadium: University Athletic Grounds

1894 Eastern college football independents records
| | Conf. | | | Overall |
| Team | W | L | T | W | | L | | T |
|---|---|---|---|---|---|---|---|---|
| Yale | | – | | 16 | – | 0 | – | 0 |
| Penn | | – | | 12 | – | 0 | – | 0 |
| Villanova | | – | | 1 | – | 0 | – | 0 |
| Penn State | | – | | 6 | – | 0 | – | 1 |
| Harvard | | – | | 11 | – | 2 | – | 0 |
| Geneva | | – | | 5 | – | 1 | – | 0 |
| Princeton | | – | | 8 | – | 2 | – | 0 |
| Temple | | – | | 4 | – | 1 | – | 0 |
| Holy Ghost College | | – | | 7 | – | 2 | – | 1 |
| Washington & Jefferson | | – | | 5 | – | 2 | – | 1 |
| Brown | | – | | 10 | – | 5 | – | 0 |
| Bucknell | | – | | 5 | – | 3 | – | 0 |
| Colgate | | – | | 2 | – | 1 | – | 1 |
| Army | | – | | 3 | – | 2 | – | 0 |
| Franklin & Marshall | | – | | 6 | – | 4 | – | 0 |
| Cornell | | – | | 6 | – | 4 | – | 1 |
| Trinity (CT) | | – | | 4 | – | 3 | – | 0 |
| Syracuse | | – | | 6 | – | 5 | – | 0 |
| Tufts | | – | | 6 | – | 5 | – | 0 |
| Massachusetts | | – | | 3 | – | 3 | – | 0 |
| Swarthmore | | – | | 5 | – | 5 | – | 0 |
| Western Univ. Penn | | – | | 1 | – | 1 | – | 0 |
| Lafayette | | – | | 5 | – | 6 | – | 0 |
| New Hampshire | | – | | 2 | – | 3 | – | 0 |
| Rutgers | | – | | 4 | – | 6 | – | 0 |
| Lehigh | | – | | 5 | – | 9 | – | 0 |
| Drexel | | – | | 1 | – | 3 | – | 0 |
| MIT | | – | | 1 | – | 4 | – | 0 |
| Boston College | | – | | 1 | – | 6 | – | 0 |
| Carlisle | | – | | 1 | – | 8 | – | 0 |
| Buffalo | | – | | 0 | – | 2 | – | 0 |
| NYU | | – | | 0 | – | 3 | – | 0 |
| Wesleyan | | – | | 0 | – | 5 | – | 0 |

The 1894 Penn Quakers football team was an American football team that represented the University of Pennsylvania as an independent during the 1894 college football season. In their third season under head coach George Washington Woodruff, the Quakers compiled a 12–0 record, shut out nine of twelve opponents, and outscored all opponents by a total of 366 to 20.

One of the largest crowds to see a game at Penn's Athletic Grounds was on November 29, 1894; temporary stands were erected and 20,000 fans filled the ballpark to see Penn defeat Harvard 18–4.

There was no contemporaneous system in 1894 for determining a national champion. However, Penn was retroactively named as the co-national champion by one selector, Parke H. Davis. Other selectors chose Princeton or Yale as the 1894 national champion Penn defeated Princeton and Harvard in head-to-head competition.

Four Penn players were named to 1894 All-America college football team: halfback Alden Knipe (chosen by Walter Camp, Caspar Whitney, and Leslie's Weekly); halfback George Brooke (chosen by Camp, Whitney, and Leslie's Weekly); end Charles Gelbert (chosen by Camp, Whitney, and Leslie's Weekly); and guard Charles Wharton (chosen by Leslie's Weekly). Three individuals from the 1894 Penn team were later inducted into the College Football Hall of Fame: Gelbert (inducted 1960); coach Woodruff (inducted 1963); and Brooke (inducted 1969).

== Schedule ==
| Date | Opponent | Site | Result | Attendance | Source |
|---|---|---|---|---|---|
| October 3 | at Franklin & Marshall | Lancaster, PA | W 34–0 | 800 | |
| October 6 | Swarthmore | Philadelphia, PA | W 66–0 | | |
| October 10 | Crescent Athletic Club | Philadelphia, PA | W 22–0 | 1,500 | |
| October 13 | Georgetown | University Athletic Grounds; Philadelphia, PA | W 46–0 | | |
| October 17 | Lehigh | Philadelphia, PA | W 30–0 | | |
| October 20 | at Crescent Athletic Club | Eastern Park; Brooklyn, NY | W 18–10 | | |
| October 26 | vs. Virginia | National Park; Washington, DC | W 14–6 | 2,500 | |
| October 27 | at Navy | Worden Field; Annapolis, MD | W 12–0 | | |
| October 31 | Lafayette | Philadelphia, PA | W 26–0 | | |
| November 10 | vs. Princeton | State Fair Grounds; Trenton, NJ (rivalry) | W 12–0 | | |
| November 17 | Cornell | Philadelphia, PA (rivalry) | W 6–0 | | |
| November 29 | Harvard | University Athletic Grounds; Philadelphia, PA (rivalry) | W 18–4 | 23,000 | |

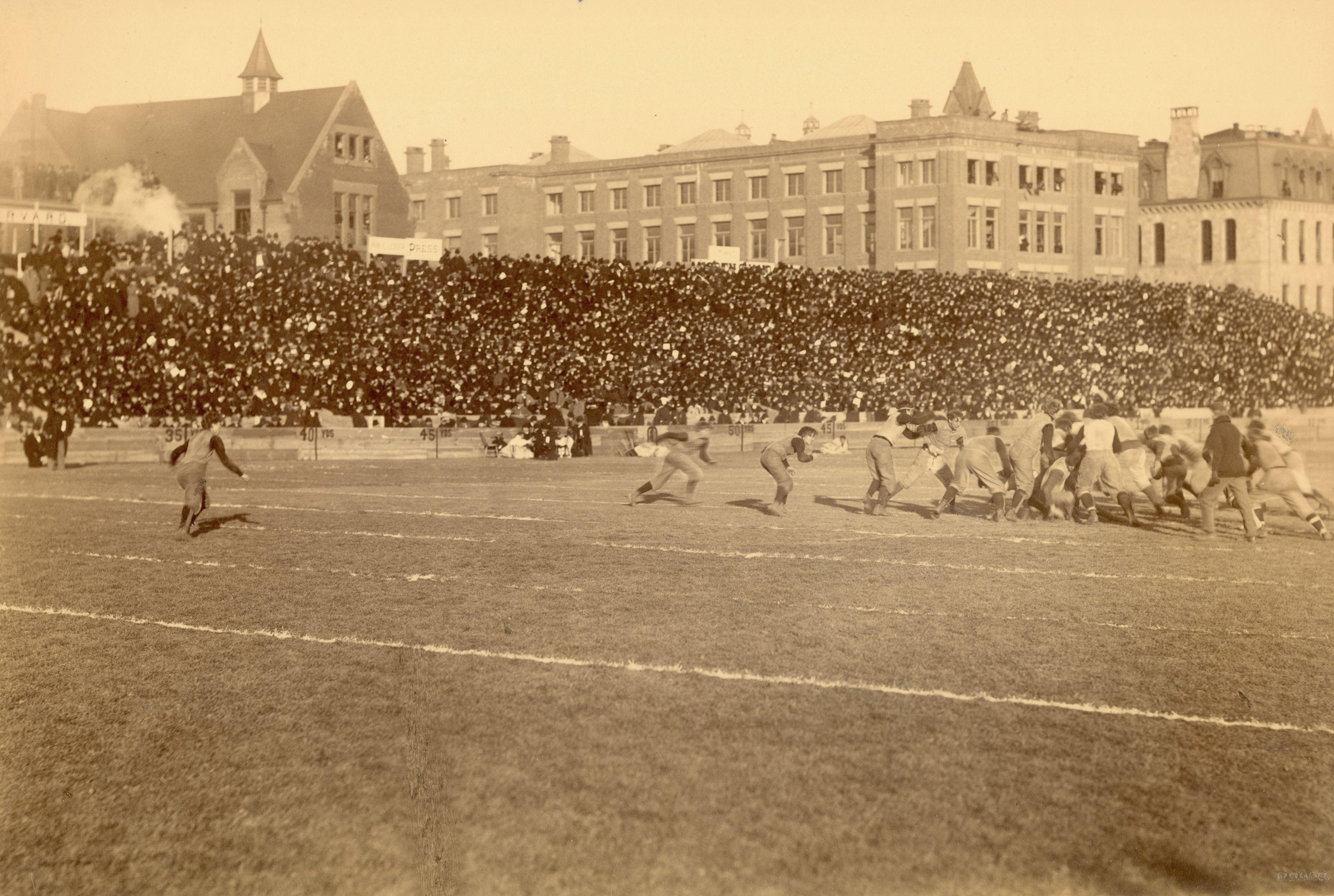
Pennsylvania-Harvard at University Athletic Grounds (November 29, 1894)
