= 1894 Greensburg Athletic Association season =

American football team season

1894 Greensburg Athletic Association football
- Record: 6–1–1
- Captain: Charles Copeland
- Home field: Athletic Park

The 1894 Greensburg Athletic Association season was their fifth season in existence. The team finished 6–1–1. The team captain was Charles Copeland, who played left tackle.

== Schedule ==
Game	Date	Opponent	Result
1	October 13	The Kiski School	W 24–0
2	October 21	Indiana Normal	W 21–0
3	October 27	vs. West Virginia	W 36–0
4	November 3	Carnegie Athletic Club of Braddock	W 24–0
5	November 10	Holy Ghost College	W 6–4
6	November 17	at Altoona Athletic Club	L 0–10
7	November 24	Jeannette Athletic Club	T 0–0
8	November 29	Altoona Athletic Club	W 6–4

== Notes and references ==
- Van Atta, Robert (1983). "The History of Pro Football At Greensburg, Pennsylvania (1894-1900)" (PDF). Coffin Corner (Annual). Professional Football Researchers Association: 1–14. Archived from the original (PDF) on November 27, 2010.
