= Middle States Intercollegiate Football League =

Early intercollegiate athletic football conference

The Middle States Intercollegiate Football League (MSIFL) was an early intercollegiate athletic football conference which played for the 1893 and 1894 seasons.

== Member Schools ==
The members who made up the MSIFL were Lafayette College, Rutgers College (now Rutgers University–New Brunswick) and Stevens Institute of Technology.

Institution	Location	Founded	Joined	Type	Enrollment	Nickname	Current Conference	Colors
Lafayette College	Easton, PA	1826	1893	Private–Presbyterian	2,610	Leopards	Patriot League (FCS)	
Rutgers University–New Brunswick	New Brunswick–Piscataway, NJ	1766	1893	Public	70,876	Scarlet Knights	Big Ten	
Stevens Institute of Technology	Hoboken, NJ	1870	1893	Private	6,125	Ducks	MAC (Division III)	

== Champions ==
- 1893 – Lafayette (2–0)
- 1894 – Rutgers (2–0)

== See also ==
- List of defunct college football conferences
