= 1894 Pittsburgh Athletic Club football season =

American football team season

1894 Pittsburgh Athletic Club football
- Record: 6–4
- Manager: Douglas Buchanan
- Captain: Clarence Lomax
- Home field: PAC Park

The Pittsburgh Athletic Club played its fifth season of American football in 1894. Led by manager Douglas Buchanan and captain Clarence Lomax, the team finished with a record of 6–4.

== Schedule ==
| Date | Opponent | Site | Result | Source |
|---|---|---|---|---|
| September 22 | at Beaver Falls YMCA | Junction Park; Beaver Falls, PA | W 10–6 | |
| September 29 | Carnegie Athletic Club (Braddock) | PAC Park; Pittsburgh, PA | W 40–0 | |
| October 13 | Altoona Athletic Association | PAC Park; Pittsburgh, PA | W 34–4 | |
| October 20 | Washington & Jefferson | PAC Park; Pittsburgh, PA | L 0–6 | |
| October 27 | Allegheny Athletic Association | PAC Park; Pittsburgh, PA | W 6–4 | |
| November 6 | at Allegheny Athletic Association | Exposition Park; Allegheny, PA | L 0–6 | |
| November 10 | Beaver Falls YMCA | PAC Park; Pittsburgh, PA | W 16–0 | |
| November 17 | Carlisle | PAC Park; Pittsburgh, PA | W 8–0 | |
| November 24 | at Allegheny Athletic Association (Note: Allegheny wins the series 2 games to 1.) | Exposition Park; Allegheny, PA | L 4–30 | |
| November 29 | Penn State (Note: Thanksgiving Day game) | PAC Park; Pittsburgh, PA | L 0–14 | |
