= 1894 college football season =

American college football season

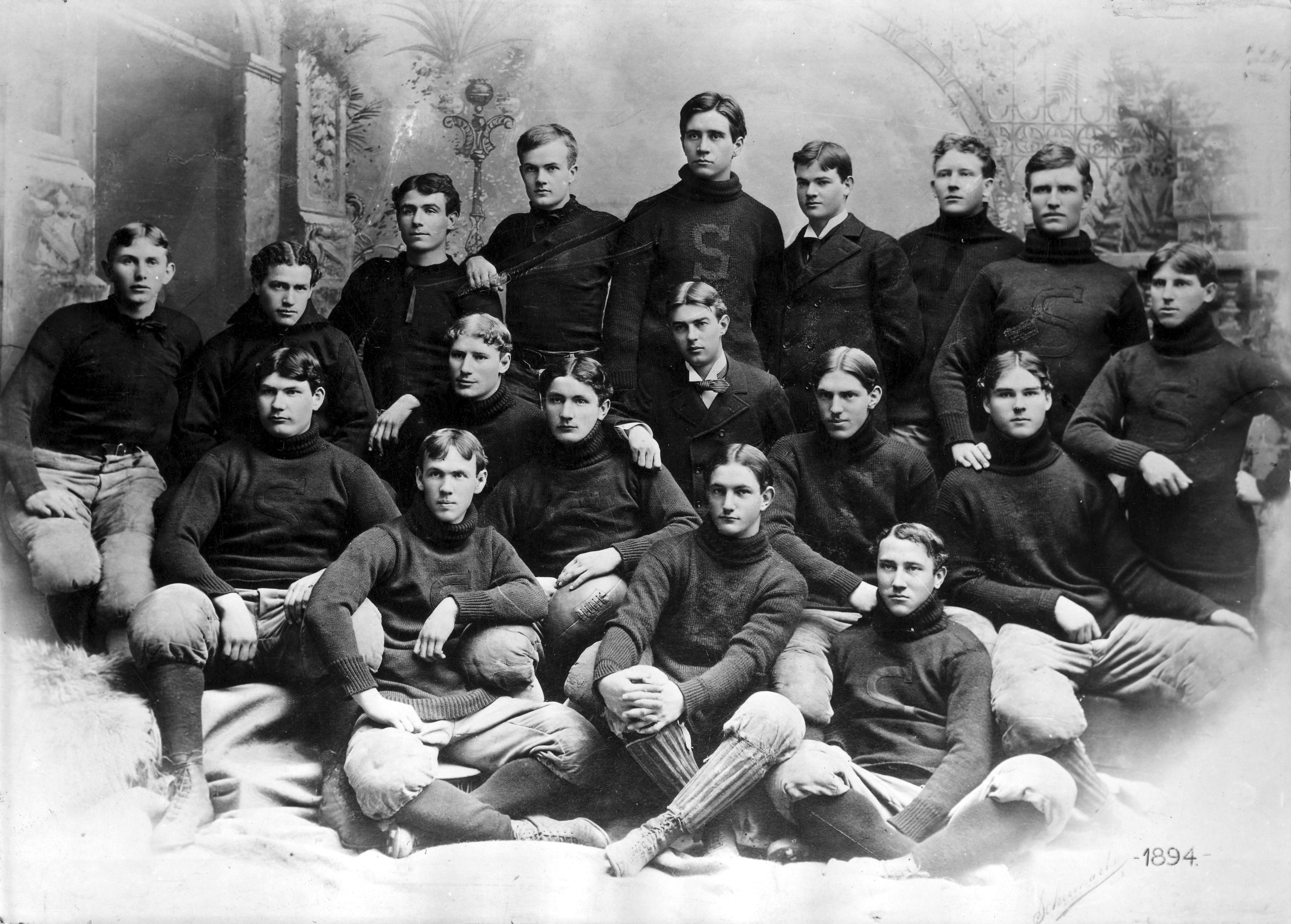
- 1894 Stanford football team
- Total No. of teams: 27
- Regular season: August 31, 1894 to January 4, 1895
- Champion(s): Pennsylvania; Princeton; Yale

The 1894 college football season was the season of American football played among colleges and universities in the United States during the 1894–95 academic year.

The 1894 Yale Bulldogs football team compiled a perfect 16–0 record, outscored opponents by a total of 485 to 13, and has been recognized as the national champion by the Billingsley Report, Helms Athletic Foundation, and National Championship Foundation, and as co-champion by Parke H. Davis.

Penn also compiled a perfect record (12–0) and was recognized as the co-national champion by Parke H. Davis. Despite suffering losses to both Yale and Penn, Princeton was recognized as the national champion under the Houlgate System.

All eleven players selected by Caspar Whitney and Walter Camp to the 1894 All-America college football team came from the Big Three (Princeton, Yale, and Harvard) or Penn. Six of the honorees have been inducted into the College Football Hall of Fame: halfback George Brooke, end Frank Hinkey (Yale), end Charlie Gelbert, tackle Langdon Lea (Princeton), guard Art Wheeler (Princeton), and guard Bill Hickok (Yale).

New programs established in 1894 included Arkansas, Oregon, and Texas A&M.

On November 29, college football was first played in the state of Florida by Stetson University.

== Conference and program changes ==
=== Conference changes ===
- Three conferences began play in 1894:
  - Maryland Intercollegiate Football Association – active until 1899
  - Michigan Intercollegiate Athletic Association – now a Division III conference
  - Southern Intercollegiate Athletic Association – active until 1942
- Two conferences played their final seasons in 1894:
  - Indiana Intercollegiate Athletic Association – founded in 1890
  - Middle States Intercollegiate Football League – founded in 1893

=== Membership changes ===
School	1893 Conference	1894 Conference
Arkansas Industrial Cardinals	Program Established	Independent
Buffalo football	Program Established	Independent
Idaho football	Program Established	Independent
Johns Hopkins Blue Jays	Independent	MIFA
Maryland Agricultural Terrapins	Independent	MIFA
Oregon Webfoots	Program Established	Independent
Texas A&M Aggies	Program Established	Independent

== Conference standings ==
=== Major conference standings ===
1894 Colorado Football Association standings
	Conf.					Overall
Team	W		L		T	W		L		T
Colorado $	5	–	0	–	0	8	–	1	–	0
Colorado Mines	1	–	2	–	0	1	–	2	–	0
Denver	1	–	3	–	0	1	–	3	–	0
Colorado College	0	–	1	–	0	1	–	2	–	0
Colorado Agricultural	0	–	1	–	0	0	–	1	–	0
$ – Conference champion

1894 Indiana Intercollegiate Athletic Association football standings
	Conf.					Overall
Team	W		L		T	W		L		T
Purdue $	4	–	0	–	0	9	–	1	–	0
Butler	3	–	1	–	0	6	–	1	–	0
Wabash	2	–	3	–	0	4	–	5	–	0
Indiana	0	–	4	–	0	0	–	4	–	1
$ – Conference champion

1894 Maryland Intercollegiate Football Association standings
	Conf.					Overall
Team	W		L		T	W		L		T
Maryland	2	–	2	–	0	4	–	3	–	0
$ – Conference champion

1894 Triangular Football League standings
	Conf.					Overall
Team	W		L		T	W		L		T
Dartmouth $	2	–	0	–	0	5	–	4	–	0
Williams	1	–	1	–	0	6	–	3	–	1
Amherst	0	–	2	–	0	7	–	5	–	1
$ – Conference champion

1894 Western Interstate University Football Association standings
	Conf.					Overall
Team	W		L		T	W		L		T
Missouri +	2	–	1	–	0	4	–	3	–	0
Nebraska +	2	–	1	–	0	6	–	2	–	0
Kansas	1	–	2	–	0	2	–	3	–	1
Iowa	1	–	2	–	0	4	–	4	–	1
+ – Conference co-champions

=== Independents ===
1894 Eastern college football independents records
	Conf.			Overall
Team	W	L	T	W		L		T
Yale		–		16	–	0	–	0
Penn		–		12	–	0	–	0
Villanova		–		1	–	0	–	0
Penn State		–		6	–	0	–	1
Harvard		–		11	–	2	–	0
Geneva		–		5	–	1	–	0
Princeton		–		8	–	2	–	0
Temple		–		4	–	1	–	0
Holy Ghost College		–		7	–	2	–	1
Washington & Jefferson		–		5	–	2	–	1
Brown		–		10	–	5	–	0
Bucknell		–		5	–	3	–	0
Colgate		–		2	–	1	–	1
Army		–		3	–	2	–	0
Frankin & Marshall		–		6	–	4	–	0
Cornell		–		6	–	4	–	1
Amherst		–		7	–	5	–	0
Trinity (CT)		–		4	–	3	–	0
Syracuse		–		6	–	5	–	0
Tufts		–		6	–	5	–	0
Massachusetts		–		3	–	3	–	0
Swarthmore		–		5	–	5	–	0
Western Univ. Penn		–		1	–	1	–	0
Lafayette		–		5	–	6	–	0
New Hampshire		–		2	–	3	–	0
Rutgers		–		4	–	6	–	0
Lehigh		–		5	–	9	–	0
Williams		–		1	–	3	–	0
Drexel		–		1	–	3	–	0
MIT		–		1	–	4	–	0
Boston College		–		1	–	6	–	0
Carlisle		–		1	–	8	–	0
Buffalo		–		0	–	2	–	0
NYU		–		0	–	3	–	0
Wesleyan		–		0	–	5	–	0

1894 Midwestern college football independents records
	Conf.			Overall
Team	W	L	T	W		L		T
Western Reserve		–		7	–	0	–	0
North Dakota Agricultural		–		2	–	0	–	0
Baldwin–Wallace		–		1	–	0	–	0
Buchtel		–		1	–	0	–	0
Michigan		–		9	–	1	–	1
Iowa Agricultural		–		5	–	1	–	0
College Of Emporia		–		4	–	1	–	0
Minnesota		–		3	–	1	–	0
Washburn		–		3	–	1	–	0
Wittenberg		–		6	–	2	–	0
Doane		–		5	–	2	–	0
Wisconsin		–		5	–	2	–	0
Notre Dame		–		3	–	1	–	1
Beloit		–		6	–	3	–	0
Washington University		–		2	–	1	–	0
Chicago		–		14	–	7	–	1
Kalamazoo		–		2	–	1	–	1
Ohio State		–		6	–	5	–	0
Case		–		4	–	3	–	0
Illinois		–		4	–	3	–	0
Oberlin		–		4	–	3	–	1
Cincinnati		–		3	–	3	–	0
Drake		–		2	–	2	–	0
Mount Union		–		4	–	5	–	0
Lake Forest		–		3	–	4	–	0
Miami (OH)		–		1	–	2	–	0
Ohio Wesleyan		–		1	–	3	–	0
Rush Medical		–		3	–	6	–	0
Northwestern		–		1	–	5	–	0
Ohio		–		0	–	1	–	0
South Dakota		–		0	–	2	–	0

1894 Southern college football independents records
	Conf.			Overall
Team	W	L	T	W		L		T
VMI		–		6	–	0	–	0
Hampden–Sydney		–		1	–	0	–	0
Tennessee		–		2	–	0	–	2
Vanderbilt		–		7	–	1	–	0
Ole Miss		–		6	–	1	–	0
Texas		–		6	–	1	–	0
Georgia		–		5	–	1	–	0
Kentucky State College		–		5	–	1	–	0
VAMC		–		4	–	1	–	0
Virginia		–		8	–	2	–	0
Centre		–		3	–	1	–	0
Alabama		–		3	–	1	–	0
Navy		–		4	–	1	–	2
North Carolina		–		6	–	3	–	0
Arkansas		–		2	–	1	–	0
LSU		–		2	–	1	–	0
West Virginia		–		2	–	2	–	0
Texas A&M		–		1	–	1	–	0
Delaware		–		1	–	1	–	0
Georgetown		–		4	–	5	–	0
Sewanee		–		3	–	4	–	0
Auburn		–		1	–	3	–	0
Johns Hopkins		–		1	–	4	–	1
Richmond		–		0	–	4	–	2
Centenary		–		0	–	1	–	0
Trinity (NC)		–		0	–	1	–	0
William & Mary		–		0	–	1	–	0
North Carolina A&M		–		0	–	2	–	0
South Carolina		–		0	–	2	–	0
Georgia Tech		–		0	–	3	–	0
Tulane		–		0	–	4	–	0

1894 Far West college football independents records
	Conf.			Overall
Team	W	L	T	W		L		T
Wyoming		–		3	–	0	–	0
USC		–		1	–	0	–	0
Stanford		–		6	–	3	–	0
Saint Mary's		–		2	–	2	–	0
Washington Agricultural		–		1	–	1	–	0
Washington		–		1	–	1	–	1
Utah		–		1	–	2	–	0
California		–		0	–	1	–	2
New Mexico A&M		–		0	–	1	–	0
Idaho		–		0	–	2	–	0

=== Minor conferences ===
Conference	Champion(s)	Record
Michigan Intercollegiate Athletic Association	Albion	3–0–0

=== Minor independents ===
1894 Kentucky state football standings
	Conf.			Overall
Team	W	L	T	W		L		T
Kentucky State*		–		5	–	2	–	0
Centre		–		3	–	1	–	0
* – State champion

== See also ==
- 1894 College Football All-America Team
