= 1894 Amherst football team =

American college football season

1894 Amherst football
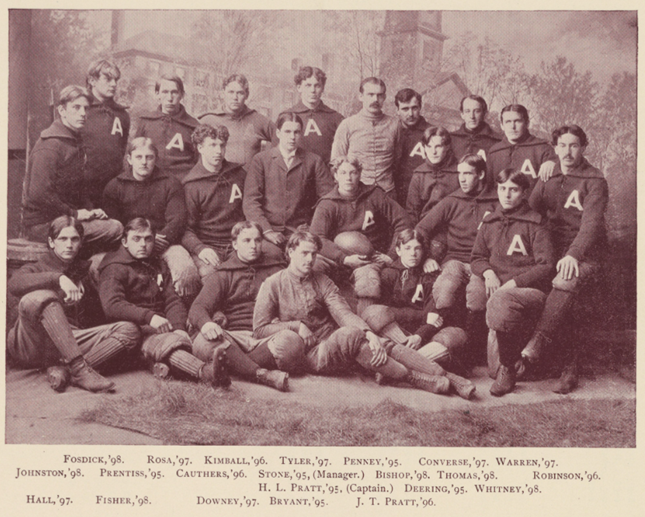
- Conference: Triangular Football League
- Record: 7–5–1 (0–2 TFL)
- Head coach: Parke H. Davis (1st season)
- Captain: Herbert L. Pratt
- Home stadium: Pratt Field

1894 Triangular Football League standings
	Conf.					Overall
Team	W		L		T	W		L		T
Dartmouth $	2	–	0	–	0	5	–	4	–	0
Williams	1	–	1	–	0	6	–	3	–	1
Amherst	0	–	2	–	0	7	–	5	–	1
$ – Conference champion

The 1894 Amherst football team represented Amherst College as a member of the Triangular Football League during the 1894 college football season. Amherst compiled an overall record of 7–5–1 with a mark of 0–2 in TFL play, finishing last out of the three teams in the league. One of the sport's best known historians, Parke H. Davis, was coach of the team. Amherst played home games at Pratt Field in Amherst, Massachusetts.

== Schedule ==
Date	Time	Opponent	Site	Result	Attendance	Source
September 27		Massachusetts*	Pratt Field; Amherst, MA	W 6–0		
September 29		Worcester Tech*	Pratt Field; Amherst, MA	W 28–0		
October 6	3:15 p.m.	at Army*	The Plain; West Point, NY	L 0–18	600	
October 9		at Wesleyan*	Middletown, CT	W 28–0		
October 11		Boston Tech*	Amherst, MA	W 6–4		
October 13		RPI*	Pratt Field; Amherst, MA	W 16–0		
October 17		at Harvard*	Soldiers' Field; Boston, MA	L 0–30	1,500	
October 20		vs. Union (NY)*	Ridgefield; Albany, NY	L 0–6	1,600	
October 24		Wesleyan*	Pratt Field; Amherst, MA	W 10–4		
October 27		at Boston Athletic Association*	Boston, MA	T 0–0	700	
November 3	3:30 p.m.	at Crescent Athletic Club*	Eastern Park; Brooklyn, NY	W 6–0		
November 10		Dartmouth	Pratt Field; Amherst, MA	L 0–30	1,200	
November 17		at Williams	Weston Field; Williamstown, MA (rivalry)	L 10–34	1,200	
*Non-conference game; Source:
