= 1894 Rutgers Queensmen football team =

American college football season

1894 Rutgers Queensmen football

Middle States champion
- Conference: Middle States Intercollegiate Football League
- Record: 4–6 (2–0 Middle States)
- Head coach: None
- Captain: William V. B. Van Dyck
- Home stadium: Neilson Field

The 1894 Rutgers Queensmen football team was an American football team that represented Rutgers University during the 1894 college football season. The team compiled a 4–6 record and was outscored by a total of 210 to 61. Rutgers was a member of the Middle States Intercollegiate Football League and won the conference championship by beating the other two member schools, Lafayette and Stevens.

The team had no coach, and its captain was William V. B. Van Dyck. Van Dyck later served as the head coach of the Rutgers football teams of 1898 and 1899.

The Rutgers football team won its two home games, playing both of those games at Neilson Field in New Brunswick, New Jersey.

== Schedule ==
Date	Time	Opponent	Site	Result	Source
September 29		at Lehigh*	South Bethlehem, PA	L 0–24	
October 6		Lafayette	Neilson Field; New Brunswick, NJ	W 12–10	
October 10		at Princeton*	Princeton, NJ (rivalry)	L 0–48	
October 17		at Stevens	St. George Cricket Ground; Hoboken, NJ	W 20–0	
October 20		at New Jersey Athletic Club*	Bayonne, NJ	W 12–0	
October 27		at Crescent Athletic Club*	Eastern Park; Brooklyn, NY	L 4–20	
November 1	3:45 p.m.	North Carolina*	Neilson Field; New Brunswick, NJ	W 5–0	
November 3		at Virginia*	Madison Hall Field; Charlottesville, VA	L 4–20	
November 5		at Columbia Athletic Club*	Washington, DC	L 0–20	
November 6		at Franklin & Marshall*	Lancaster, PA	L 4–68	
*Non-conference game
