= Eugene Messler =

American football player, coach, and businessman (1873–1950)

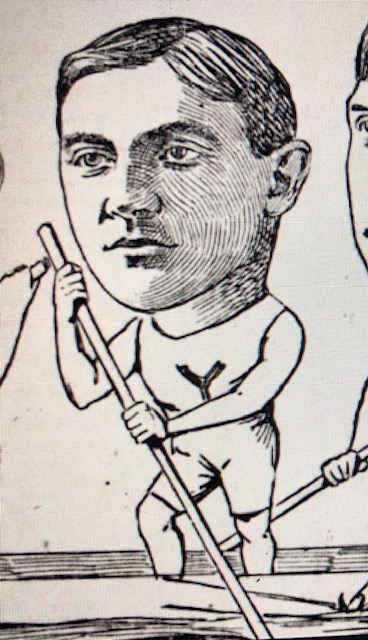
- Caricature of Messler from The Boston Globe, June 30, 1893

Biographical details
- Born: April 6, 1873; Allegheny, Pennsylvania, U.S.
- Died: March 1, 1950 (aged 76); Pittsburgh, Pennsylvania, U.S.

Playing career
- 1891–1893: Yale
- 1895–1897: Duquesne Country and Athletic Club
- Position: Tackle

Coaching career (HC unless noted)
- 1894: Centre

Head coaching record
- Overall: 3–1

Eugene Lawrence Messler (April 6, 1873 – March 1, 1950) was an American football player and coach and businessman. He played at the tackle position for Yale's 1891, 1892, and 1893 championship teams, coached the 1894 Centre football team, and played on the Duquesne Country and Athletic Club professional football teams from 1895 to 1897. He was the general superintendent of Jones and Laughlin Steel Company's Pittsburgh coke ovens and blast furnaces from approximately 1899 to 1911 and the president of the Eureka Fire Brick Company for many years commencing in 1907.

== Early years ==
Born in Allegheny, Pennsylvania (now part of Pittsburgh) in 1873, Messler was the son of Thomas D. Messler (1834–1893), an executive with the Pennsylvania Railroad, and Maria Remsen (Varick) Messler. He was educated in the Allegheny schools and later at the Shady Side Academy.

Messler enrolled at the Sheffield Scientific School at Yale University in 1891. He played college football on Yale's freshman and varsity football team in 1891. He played at the tackle position under Yale's head coach Walter Camp and was a member of Camp's undefeated 1892 Yale team. In his final year at Yale, he played for the 1893 Yale team. In the three years that Messler played football for Yale, the teams were recognized as national champion each year, compiled an overall record of 36–1, and outscored opponents by a total of 1,247 to 12. Messer also competed on the Yale crew, served as class president for two years, and graduated in 1894 with a degree in mechanical engineering.

== Coaching career ==
He served as the head football coach at Centre College in Danville, Kentucky in 1894. Messler arrived in Danville in mid-September and was greeted at the railroad depot with "ringing cheers" by a delegation of students. Messler promptly initiated daily training for the football candidates and was credited with implementing "a course of systematic work and active training." He led the 1894 Centre football team to a 3–1 record, including a 110–0 victory over Bethel College and a 67–0 victory over Kentucky State (now known as the University of Kentucky). The team's only loss was by a 6–0 score to a Vanderbilt team that compiled a 7–1 record.

Messler was also a player for the Duquesne Country and Athletic Club, an early professional football team, from 1895 to 1897. The team was the champion of Western Pennsylvania Independent Football in 1895.

== Business career and later years ==
Messler began a career in business with the Carnegie Steel Company at the Edger Thompson Works and later worked for Jones & Laughlin Steel Co. In May 1895, Messler served as engineer overseeing the construction of the Duquesne blast furnaces and later became the general superintendent of labor. He favored an induced draft that could vary the pressure in furnaces so they would not have to depend entirely on a stack, noting that excessive temperatures were an unnecessary test on the brick linings. He was the general superintendent of Jones & Laughlin's coke ovens and blast furnaces from approximately 1899 to 1911. From 1912 to 1915 he was assistant to the president at the Riter-Conley Manufacturing Company, and from 1916 to 1918 was vice president of the Witherow Steel Company. He also served as president of the Eureka Fire Brick Company for many years commencing in 1907.

Messler also served as the director of the Fisher Scientific Company and the Scientific Materials Company. At one time he was also the director of the Third National Bank of Pittsburgh. He was a member of several societies, including the National Geographic Society, the Engineer's Society of Western Pennsylvania, the Iron and Steel Institute, and the Pittsburgh Athletic Association. He was an avid big-game hunter and was an amateur tennis player.

Messler also served in the United States Army during World War I, after being commissioned captain of engineers on May 20, 1918. He served in France with the American Expeditionary Forces and attaining the rank of major in the Army reserves. He participated in the Meuse–Argonne offensive and became friends with Gen. John J. Pershing. He received the Victory Medal with two battle clasps for his service. Messler remained active in Army reserve organizations, retiring as a colonel in 1947.

In 1898, Messler married Elizabeth Verner Long. They had two sons: Thomas Doremus Messler and Eugene Lawrence Messler Jr.

Messler was the victim of a hit-and-run driver in approximately 1945, which significantly impacted his health. He died in 1950 at age 76 at Pittsburgh's West Penn Hospital. The cause of death was intestinal obstruction, and he is buried in Homewood Cemetery.

== Head coaching record ==
=== College ===
Year	Team	Overall	Conference	Standing	Bowl/playoffs
Centre (Independent) (1894)
1894	Centre	3–1			
Centre:		3–1			
Total:		3–1			
