= 1894 Georgia Tech football team =

American college football season

1894 Georgia Tech football
- Conference: Independent
- Record: 0–3
- Head coach: R. T. "Dutch" Dorsey (1st season)
- Captain: Tom Raoul
- Home stadium: Athletic Park Grounds

Uniform
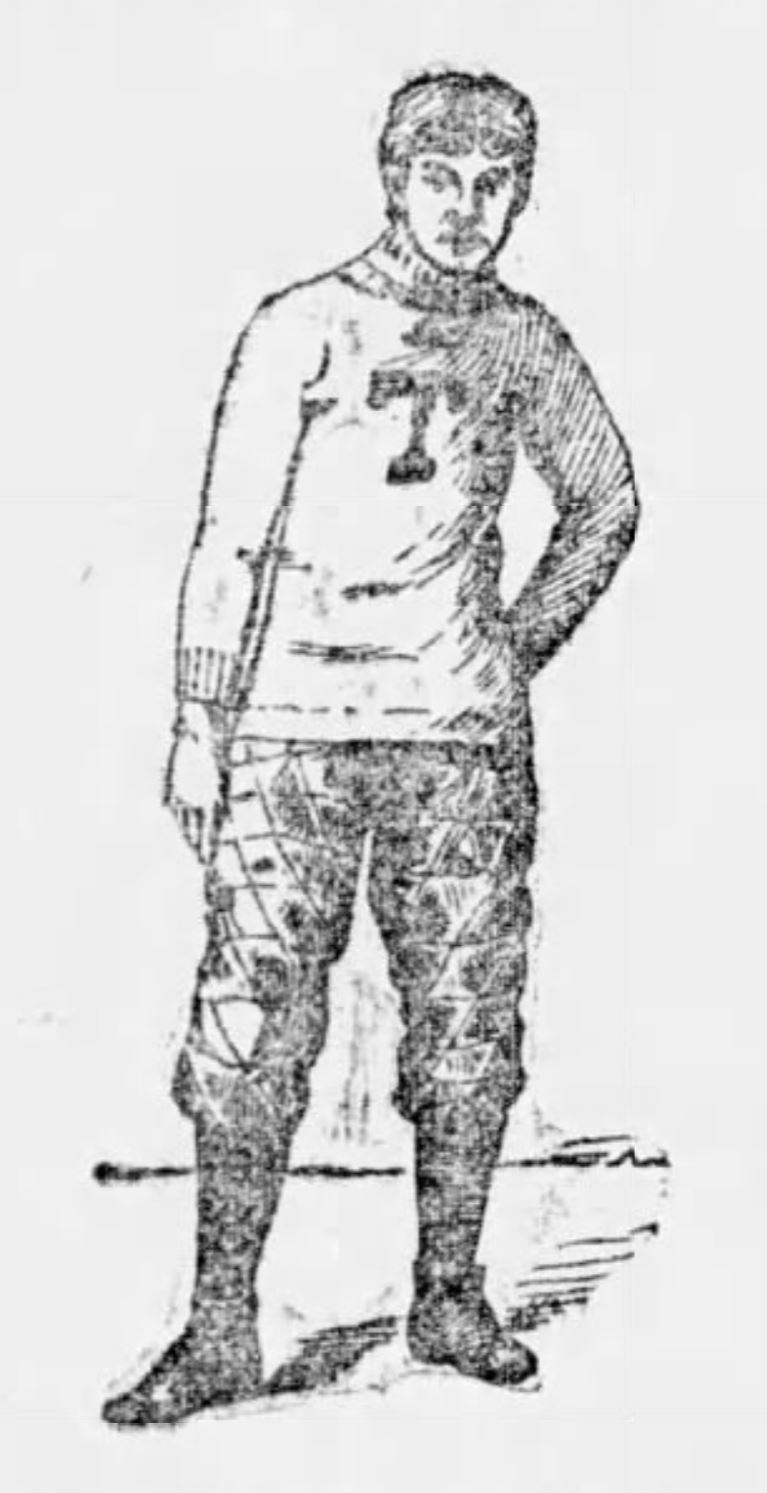

1894 Southern college football independents records
| | Conf. | | | Overall |
| Team | W | L | T | W | | L | | T |
|---|---|---|---|---|---|---|---|---|
| VMI | | – | | 6 | – | 0 | – | 0 |
| Hampden–Sydney | | – | | 1 | – | 0 | – | 0 |
| Tennessee | | – | | 2 | – | 0 | – | 2 |
| Vanderbilt | | – | | 7 | – | 1 | – | 0 |
| Ole Miss | | – | | 6 | – | 1 | – | 0 |
| Texas | | – | | 6 | – | 1 | – | 0 |
| Georgia | | – | | 5 | – | 1 | – | 0 |
| Kentucky State College | | – | | 5 | – | 1 | – | 0 |
| VAMC | | – | | 4 | – | 1 | – | 0 |
| Virginia | | – | | 8 | – | 2 | – | 0 |
| Centre | | – | | 3 | – | 1 | – | 0 |
| Alabama | | – | | 3 | – | 1 | – | 0 |
| Navy | | – | | 4 | – | 1 | – | 2 |
| North Carolina | | – | | 6 | – | 3 | – | 0 |
| Arkansas | | – | | 2 | – | 1 | – | 0 |
| LSU | | – | | 2 | – | 1 | – | 0 |
| West Virginia | | – | | 2 | – | 2 | – | 0 |
| Texas A&M | | – | | 1 | – | 1 | – | 0 |
| Delaware | | – | | 1 | – | 1 | – | 0 |
| Georgetown | | – | | 4 | – | 5 | – | 0 |
| Sewanee | | – | | 3 | – | 4 | – | 0 |
| Auburn | | – | | 1 | – | 3 | – | 0 |
| Johns Hopkins | | – | | 1 | – | 4 | – | 1 |
| Richmond | | – | | 0 | – | 4 | – | 2 |
| Centenary | | – | | 0 | – | 1 | – | 0 |
| Trinity (NC) | | – | | 0 | – | 1 | – | 0 |
| William & Mary | | – | | 0 | – | 1 | – | 0 |
| North Carolina A&M | | – | | 0 | – | 2 | – | 0 |
| South Carolina | | – | | 0 | – | 2 | – | 0 |
| Georgia Tech | | – | | 0 | – | 3 | – | 0 |
| Tulane | | – | | 0 | – | 4 | – | 0 |

The 1894 Georgia Tech football team represented the Georgia School of Technology during the 1894 college football season. It was the team's third season. R. T. "Dutch" Dorsey coached the team, at least in the early stages of the season, and Adger Stewart served as the manager. Tom Raoul was named captain. Only two players, Raoul and Murdock McRae, returned from the previous year, and McRae suffered a broken leg in the first game.

During the year, the team was referred to as the Techs, and its colors were old gold and white (the first year Georgia Tech used "old gold" versus "gold"). Home games were played at Athletic Park Grounds in Atlanta, Georgia.

Stewart was able to supply the team with new uniforms and Dorsey led the team through practice every afternoon from 4 p.m. until dark. The team was able to secure "first-class" sleeping and bathing quarters and went on a carefully planned diet, though the team's low weight proved to be a major disadvantage against its heavier opponents. The team also played a scrimmage against officers from Fort McPherson, losing 0 to 4.

Despite all of the preparations, optimism, and a packed proposed schedule, the season soon broke down due to lack of adequate coaching and training, games that didn't materialize, financial issues, and the inability to maintain a consistent line-up. Only ten men had been selected for the team as late as October 15, five days before the season had originally planned to begin. The result was one of the worst seasons in Georgia Tech history: the team failed to score a point and went winless over three games while suffering its worst ever defeat, a 0–94 loss to Auburn.

One consequence of the disappointing season was the absence of a Georgia Tech team in 1895. Dorsey reported that Georgia Tech's Trustees would not allow the Techs to field a football team the following year. Georgia Tech would not return to the field until October 31, 1896.

== Schedule ==
| Date | Time | Opponent | Site | Result | Attendance | Source |
|---|---|---|---|---|---|---|
| October 27 | 4:00 p.m. | at Savannah A. A. A. | Bolton Street Park; Savannah, GA (Note: The Georgia Tech information guide erroneously lists this game as being played in Atlanta."2023 Georgia Tech Football Information Guide" (PDF). Georgia Tech Athletic Association. Atlanta, Georgia. 2023.) | L 0–8 | 350 | |
| November 17 | 2:00 p.m. | Auburn | Athletic Park Grounds; Atlanta, GA | L 0–94 | 500 | |
| November 22 | | Georgia | Athletic Park Grounds; Atlanta, GA | Cancelled (Note: Following the immense loss against Auburn, Georgia Tech asked Georgia to only play undergraduates. Georgia declined to do this and the game was declared off."To Settle an Old Score". The Atlanta Journal. Atlanta, Georgia. November 23, 1894.) | | |
| November 29 | 3:10 p.m. | Fort McPherson | Athletic Park Grounds; Atlanta, GA | L 0–34 | 500 | |

Before the season started, Georgia Tech proposed a number of games: October 20 against Furman, October 27 against Mercer (later planned for December 17), November 3 and 29 against Georgia (later reduced to only one match on November 22), and November 10 against Auburn (later moved to November 17). Tech also received a challenge from the Peachtree Blues, a local club team from Atlanta. Most of these games did not materialize.

== Game summaries ==
Georgia Tech Techs (0–0–0) at Savannah A. A. A. Savannahians (0–0–0)

| Quarter | 1 | 2 | Total |
|---|---|---|---|
| Georgia Tech | 0 | 0 | 0 |
| Savannah | 6 | 2 | 8 |

at Bolton Street Park • Savannah, Georgia

- Date: Saturday, October 27, 1894
- Game time: 4:00 p.m.
- Game attendance: 350

Georgia Tech's first game of the season was against the Savannah Amateur Athletic Association at Bolton Street Park in Savannah, Georgia. Savannah was a community association that had played football the previous year and re-formed as an organization prior to the opening of the 1894 season. The Savannah players averaged about forty pounds heavier than the Techs.

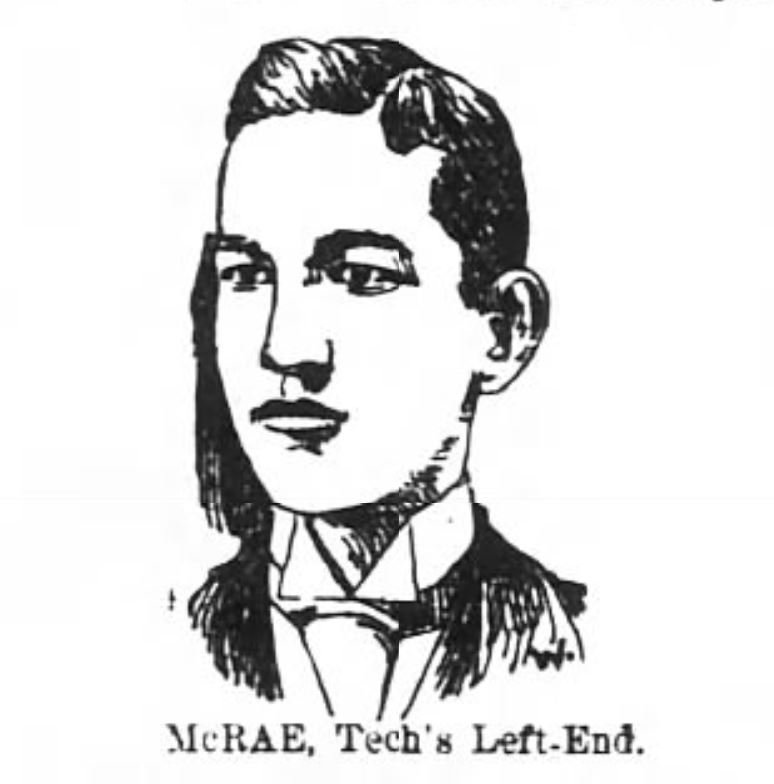
Murdock McRae (1870-1942)

Georgia Tech won the opening toss and deferred to Savannah, who employed attacks up the center. However, neither side was able to move forward more than a few yards before being forced to punt. Gradually, field possession began to tip in Savannah's favor, and the home team scored a touchdown with their left halfback. This would be the only score of the first half, which ended with a score of 6–0 in Savannah's favor.

In the second half, Tech made much better progress and reached a few yards of Savannah's goal on a couple of occasions. On one such drive, Tech's Murdock McRae fumbled the ball and Savannah returned it within a yard of the Techs' goal. It was returned to Georgia Tech on a foul, but Tech was forced back over the line for a safety. For the remainder of the game, the teams did not make much progress. As darkness fell in, McRae was tackled out of bounds and severely broke his right leg just below the knee. He was treated by a couple of doctors at the game and was able to return to Atlanta that night. The game was called with Savannah winning 8-0.

Compounding the loss, McRae's injury was a double blow to the team. He was one of only two returning players from the 1893 season and one Tech's best players. Following the game, Savannah offered to take the Georgia Tech players to the theater that night, but the faculty required the players to return to Atlanta.

Auburn Tigers (0–1–0) at Georgia Tech Techs (0–1–0)

| Quarter | 1 | 2 | Total |
|---|---|---|---|
| Auburn | 40 | 54 | 94 |
| Georgia Tech | 0 | 0 | 0 |

at Athletic Park Grounds • Atlanta, Georgia

- Date: Saturday, November 17, 1893
- Game time: 2:00 p.m.
- Game attendance: 500

Georgia Tech's second match-up came against Auburn, who had lost their first game of the season, at the Athletic Park Grounds in Atlanta. The game had almost been postponed to allow Auburn a chance to play North Carolina, but the terms and compensation between Auburn and North Carolina could not be arranged. Ahead of the game, the Thomas M. Clarke & Co., displayed two large silk flags inside its show windows to represent both teams, Auburn's in blue and orange and Georgia Tech's in old gold and white. Spectators wore chrysanthemums on their blouses, shirts, and hats while attending the game.

Georgia Tech was outmatched from the very beginning due to Auburn's size and energy and the absence of McRae, one of its best players, and never came closer than thirty yards of Auburn's goal. The papers said that the Tech players were "not in any shape to play football; they were not in training and had received insufficient coaching". Ironically, Dutch Dorsey, Georgia Tech's coach and a former Auburn player, served as one of the referees.

From the start, Georgia Tech was unable to gain much ground against the Auburn line and fumbling allowed Auburn to take over on offense with good field position. Auburn scored several touchdowns quickly and easily. The Tech defense was exhausted and George Forrest was forced to call for a substitute. W. H. Camp and Charley Hill soon followed. By the end of the first half, Auburn was winning 40-0.

The teams agreed to reduce the second half down to twenty-five minutes. Auburn continued where it left off, achieve very long runs around the ends, one of them going for seventy yards. Auburn scored another 54 points in the second half, winning the game by a total of 94-0, having scored sixteen touchdowns and fifteen goals. The game marks the largest defeat in Georgia Tech's history.

Fort McPherson Officers (0–0–0) at Georgia Tech Techs (0–2–0)

| Quarter | 1 | 2 | Total |
|---|---|---|---|
| Fort McPherson | 16 | 18 | 34 |
| Georgia Tech | 0 | 0 | 0 |

at Athletic Park Grounds • Atlanta, Georgia

- Date: Thursday, November 29, 1893
- Game time: 3:10 p.m.
- Game attendance: 500

Following the embarrassing loss to Auburn and the subsequent ridicule in local papers, Georgia Tech found itself in poor shape. The team was no longer receiving regular coaching or training and needed its next game to be a financial success in order to refit the program for the next season. They had asked Georgia to only play undergraduates in their upcoming Thanksgiving game on November 22, and when Georgia declined, the game was called off entirely. After the cancellation, Tech scheduled a game with officers at Fort McPherson, instead. Fort McPherson was coached by Leonard Wood who was the star player and coach of Tech's 1892 team. Fort McPherson had beaten the Techs 4–0 in a scrimmage a few weeks earlier and had practiced with Tech throughout the season. Fort McPherson was the heavier team. In preparation for the game, Georgia Tech brought in new players including Ernest Nourse, a veteran of the 1893 team.

The game was considered to be a messy affair lacking great skill with many plays that began offsides and reckless illegal forward passes that were not called by the referee. Georgia Tech won the toss, causing Tom Raoul to remark "I've won the toss every time, and have heretofore lost the game. I hope it will be better this time".

The first half started out well for the Techs and Ogletree and Meyer were all able to make big runs up the center, but eventually their momentum ran out and they were forced to punt. The teams exchanged fumbles, but Fort McPherson had won the position battle. Wood ran for eight yards up to ten yards from the Tech goal and Romeyn ran through the center for the score. The next series of drives were a series of struggles for Georigia Tech as they were unable to move the ball and fumbled regularly. As the Techs became tired, their tackling suffered. Fort McPherson used this to their advantage by running around the ends, and Tech had a difficult time stopping Wood. At one point, a Tech play was assessed a 25-yard penalty for grabbing Wood around the ankles, which put the ball two yards from Tech's touchdown. Romeyn scored on the next play. Tech's play became more and more sloppy with players running into each other causing their teammate to fall. At one point, Tech attempted a fake punt, but then fumbled the ball for no gain after trying to capitalize on Fort McPherson's surprise. Fort McPherson promptly marched down the field and Wood scored a touchdown. The half had ended with Fort McPherson leading by a score of 16-0.

The second half became repetitive as Georgia Tech would get stopped on runs or would fumble and then Fort McPherson would score after a few plays. Romeyn continued his great performance for Fort McPherson and had several runs of twenty yards including a forty-five-yard touchdown. Fort McPherson would go on to score three more. Tech continued its poor rushing attack and was forced to punt often and filed . By the time the second half wrapped up, Fort McPherson had won 34-0. Although a game was later scheduled for December 17 against Mercer, Georgia Tech would not play again until the 1896 season.

== Players ==
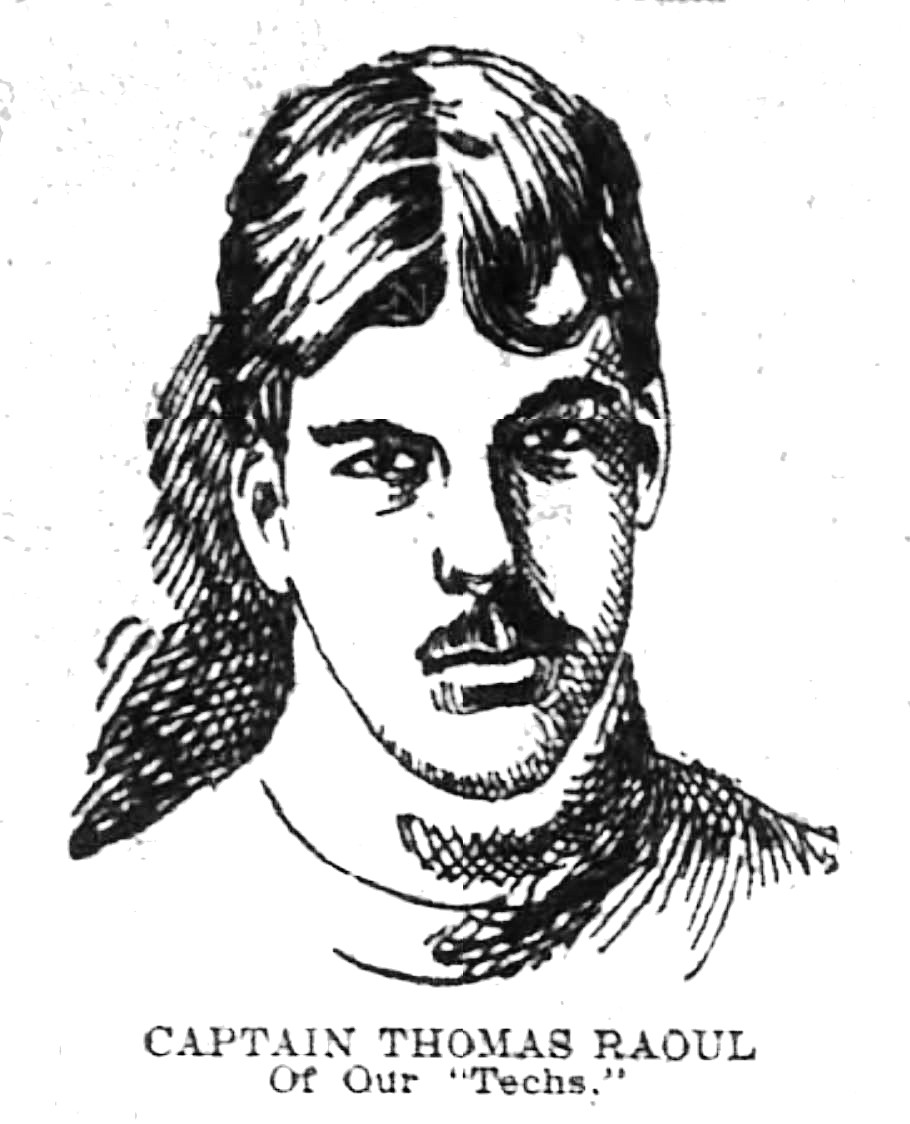
Tom Raoul (1877–1953), Tech's captain

1894 Georgia Tech game starters
| | Savannah | Auburn | Fort McPherson |
|---|---|---|---|
| Left end | Tom Raoul (C) | Tom Raoul (C) | Tom Raoul (C) |
| Left tackle | Charley Hill | Charley Hill | Charley Hill |
| Left guard | Remane | George Forest | Ottley |
| Center | B. N. Wilson | B. N. Wilson | G. Z. Echols |
| Right guard | George Forest | G. Z. Echols | George Forest |
| Right tackle | West | W. H. Camp | Charles Nourse |
| Right end | Carl Meyer | Carl Meyer | Carl Meyer |
| Quarterback | Charles McCall | John Smith | Charles McCall |
| Left halfback | W. H. Houten | W. H. Houten | Will Raoul, Jr. |
| Right halfback | Frank Ogletree | Frank Ogletree | Frank Ogletree |
| Fullback | Murdock McRae | H. R. Hart | H. R. Hart |
| Substitutes | C. H. Almond • G. V. Hoyt • Adger Stewart • Smith | | |
