= Robert Winston (coach) =

American football coach

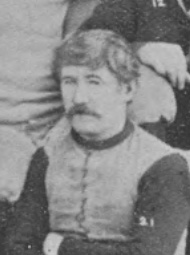
- Winston cropped from the 1894 Georgia football team photo

Biographical details
- Born: August 5, 1847; Fulham, Middlesex, England
- Died: after 1913

Coaching career (HC unless noted)
- 1890: Syracuse
- 1894: Georgia

Head coaching record
- Overall: 12–5

Robert Winston (August 5, 1847 – after 1913) was an American college football coach. He served as the head football coach at Syracuse University in 1890 and at the University of Georgia in 1894, compiling a career record of 12–5.

Winston was British and had previously coached the Blackheath Harriers rugby team in England. He was also a "bantam boxer" and trainer for an athletic club in London, before coming to the United States in 1883. After moving to the United States, Winston also helped train football teams at Yale University (1883–1888), Amherst College (1889), and the University of Rochester (1890), Williams College, Princeton University and other New England based teams. Winston also worked at the Berkeley Athletic club in New York. After Yale, Winston also oversaw the building of a gymnasium in Townsend, Washington in 1887.

Winston was the first coach of the Syracuse and Georgia football teams to receive a salary. During his single season at Georgia in 1894, Winston's team compiled a record of 5–1 including a win against the Auburn Tigers.

== Head coaching record ==
Year	Team	Overall	Conference	Standing	Bowl/playoffs
Syracuse Orangemen (Independent) (1890)
1890	Syracuse	7–4			
Syracuse:		7–4			
Georgia Bulldogs (Independent) (1894)
1894	Georgia	5–1			
Georgia:		5–1			
Total:		12–5			
