= 1894 Sewanee Tigers football team =

American college football season

1894 Sewanee Tigers football
- Conference: Independent
- Record: 3–4
- Head coach: Herbert C. Foss (1st season)
- Captain: A. G. Blacklock
- Home stadium: Hardee Field

1894 Southern college football independents records
	Conf.			Overall
Team	W	L	T	W		L		T
VMI		–		6	–	0	–	0
Hampden–Sydney		–		1	–	0	–	0
Tennessee		–		2	–	0	–	2
Vanderbilt		–		7	–	1	–	0
Ole Miss		–		6	–	1	–	0
Texas		–		6	–	1	–	0
Georgia		–		5	–	1	–	0
Kentucky State College		–		5	–	1	–	0
VAMC		–		4	–	1	–	0
Virginia		–		8	–	2	–	0
Centre		–		3	–	1	–	0
Alabama		–		3	–	1	–	0
Navy		–		4	–	1	–	2
North Carolina		–		6	–	3	–	0
Arkansas		–		2	–	1	–	0
LSU		–		2	–	1	–	0
West Virginia		–		2	–	2	–	0
Texas A&M		–		1	–	1	–	0
Delaware		–		1	–	1	–	0
Georgetown		–		4	–	5	–	0
Sewanee		–		3	–	4	–	0
Auburn		–		1	–	3	–	0
Johns Hopkins		–		1	–	4	–	1
Richmond		–		0	–	4	–	2
Centenary		–		0	–	1	–	0
Trinity (NC)		–		0	–	1	–	0
William & Mary		–		0	–	1	–	0
North Carolina A&M		–		0	–	2	–	0
South Carolina		–		0	–	2	–	0
Georgia Tech		–		0	–	3	–	0
Tulane		–		0	–	4	–	0

The 1894 Sewanee Tigers football team was an American football team that represented Sewanee: The University of the South (familiarly known as Sewanee) as an independent during the 1894 college football season. In their first year under head coach Herbert C. Foss, the team compiled an overall record of 3–4.

== Schedule ==
Date	Opponent	Site	Result	Source
October 27	vs. North Carolina	Allandale Field; Asheville, NC	L 4–36	
October 29	at Georgia	Herty Field; Athens, GA	W 12–8	
November 3	Nashville	Hardee Field; Sewanee, TN	W 30–4	
November 15	at Alabama	Lakeview Park; Birmingham, AL	L 4–24	
November 17	at Tulane	Sportsman's Park; New Orleans, LA	W 12–6	
November 19	at Southern Athletic Club	Sportsman's Park; New Orleans, LA	L 10–18	
November 29	at Vanderbilt	Dudley Field; Nashville, TN (rivalry)	L 0–12	
