= 1894 West Virginia Mountaineers football team =

American college football season

1894 West Virginia Mountaineers football
- Conference: Independent
- Record: 2–2
- Head coach: F. William Rane (2nd season)
- Captain: George H. A. Kunst

1894 Southern college football independents records
	Conf.			Overall
Team	W	L	T	W		L		T
VMI		–		6	–	0	–	0
Hampden–Sydney		–		1	–	0	–	0
Tennessee		–		2	–	0	–	2
Vanderbilt		–		7	–	1	–	0
Ole Miss		–		6	–	1	–	0
Texas		–		6	–	1	–	0
Georgia		–		5	–	1	–	0
Kentucky State College		–		5	–	1	–	0
VAMC		–		4	–	1	–	0
Virginia		–		8	–	2	–	0
Centre		–		3	–	1	–	0
Alabama		–		3	–	1	–	0
Navy		–		4	–	1	–	2
North Carolina		–		6	–	3	–	0
Arkansas		–		2	–	1	–	0
LSU		–		2	–	1	–	0
West Virginia		–		2	–	2	–	0
Texas A&M		–		1	–	1	–	0
Delaware		–		1	–	1	–	0
Georgetown		–		4	–	5	–	0
Sewanee		–		3	–	4	–	0
Auburn		–		1	–	3	–	0
Johns Hopkins		–		1	–	4	–	1
Richmond		–		0	–	4	–	2
Centenary		–		0	–	1	–	0
Trinity (NC)		–		0	–	1	–	0
William & Mary		–		0	–	1	–	0
North Carolina A&M		–		0	–	2	–	0
South Carolina		–		0	–	2	–	0
Georgia Tech		–		0	–	3	–	0
Tulane		–		0	–	4	–	0

The 1894 West Virginia Mountaineers football team represented West Virginia University during the 1894 college football season. In their second and final season under head coach F. William Rane, the Mountaineers compiled a 2–2 record and were outscored by opponents by a combined total of 52 to 28. The team won its two home games against Mt. Pleasant (16–0) and Bethany (WV) (6–0) and lost its two road games against the Greensburg Athletic Association (0–36) and Marietta (6–16). George H. A. Kunst was the team captain.

== Schedule ==
Date	Opponent	Site	Result
October 20	Mount Pleasant	Morgantown, WV	W 16–0
October 27	vs. Greensburg Athletic Association	Connellsville, PA	L 0–36
November 10	Bethany (WV)	Morgantown, WV	W 6–0
November 17	vs. Marietta	Parkersburg, WV	L 6–16

== Roster ==
1894 West Virginia Mountaineers football team roster
Players
Coaches
Offense

Pos.	#	Name	Class
End	12	John "Chip" Rane
End	6	Samuel Jacobs
Tackle	11	Donald Porter
Tackle	16	Henry White
Guard	4	Charles Carrigan
Guard	7	George R. Krebs
Guard	8	George H. A. Kunst
Center	15	Walter South
QB	2	William Lewis Beale
QB	3	William J. Bruner
QB	14	Benjamin Franklin Rice
HB	1	George Bambrick
HB	5	Harry O. Cole
HB	9	Karl Kunst
HB	13	E. Bunker Reynolds
FB	10	Henry M. Leps

Defense

Pos.	#	Name	Class
DE	12	John "Chip" Rane
DE	6	Samuel Jacobs
DT	11	Donald Porter
DT	16	Henry White
DG	4	Charles Carrigan
DG	7	George R. Krebs
DG	8	George H. A. Kunst
NG	15	Walter South
LB	10	Henry M. Leps
DB	1	George Bambrick
DB	5	Harry O. Cole
DB	9	Karl Kunst
DB	13	E. Bunker Reynolds
S	2	William Lewis Beale
S	3	William J. Bruner
S	14	Benjamin Franklin Rice

Special teams

Pos.	#	Name	Class
P	10	Henry M. Leps
K	10	Henry M. Leps
KR	1	George Bambrick
KR	13	E. Bunker Reynolds
PR	9	Karl Kunst
PR	5	Harry O. Cole

Head coach

F. William Rane

Coordinators/assistant coaches

Legend

- (C) Team captain
- (S) Suspended
- (I) Ineligible
- Injured
- Redshirt
