= 1894 Georgetown football team =

American college football season

1894 Georgetown football
- Conference: Independent
- Record: 4–5
- Head coach: Bob Carmody (1st season)
- Captain: George Bahen
- Home stadium: Georgetown Field

1894 Southern college football independents records
	Conf.			Overall
Team	W	L	T	W		L		T
VMI		–		6	–	0	–	0
Hampden–Sydney		–		1	–	0	–	0
Tennessee		–		2	–	0	–	2
Vanderbilt		–		7	–	1	–	0
Ole Miss		–		6	–	1	–	0
Texas		–		6	–	1	–	0
Georgia		–		5	–	1	–	0
Kentucky State College		–		5	–	1	–	0
VAMC		–		4	–	1	–	0
Virginia		–		8	–	2	–	0
Centre		–		3	–	1	–	0
Alabama		–		3	–	1	–	0
Navy		–		4	–	1	–	2
North Carolina		–		6	–	3	–	0
Arkansas		–		2	–	1	–	0
LSU		–		2	–	1	–	0
West Virginia		–		2	–	2	–	0
Texas A&M		–		1	–	1	–	0
Delaware		–		1	–	1	–	0
Georgetown		–		4	–	5	–	0
Sewanee		–		3	–	4	–	0
Auburn		–		1	–	3	–	0
Johns Hopkins		–		1	–	4	–	1
Richmond		–		0	–	4	–	2
Centenary		–		0	–	1	–	0
Trinity (NC)		–		0	–	1	–	0
William & Mary		–		0	–	1	–	0
North Carolina A&M		–		0	–	2	–	0
South Carolina		–		0	–	2	–	0
Georgia Tech		–		0	–	3	–	0
Tulane		–		0	–	4	–	0

The 1894 Georgetown football team represented the Georgetown University during the 1894 college football season. Georgetown finished the season with a 4–5 record. Bob Carmody served as player-coach. They played home games at Georgetown Field. During the final game against Columbia AC, Shorty Bahen was seriously injured and left partially paralyzed. He died from his injuries four months later. Georgetown disbanded its football team for three years as a result. When the team reformed in 1898, only collegiate opponents were permitted.

== Schedule ==
Date	Opponent	Site	Result	Attendance
October 10	at Gallaudet	Kendall Green; Washington, DC	W 16–0	
October 14	at Penn	University Athletic Grounds; Philadelphia, PA	L 0–46	
October 17	at Camden Athletic Club	Camden AC Field; Camden, NJ	W 22–0	
October 21	at Navy	Worden Field; Annapolis, MD	L 0–12	
October 27	Swarthmore	Georgetown Field; Washington, DC	W 22–18	
November 3	North Carolina	Georgetown Field; Washington, DC	L 4–20	
November 7	at Maryland	Maryland Agricultural College Field; College Park, MD	L 4–6	
November 17	Richmond	Georgetown Field; Washington, DC	W 34–0	
November 28	Columbia Athletic Club	Boundary Field; Washington, D.C.	L 0–20	10,000
