= 1894 Arkansas Industrial Cardinals football team =

American college football season

1894 Arkansas Industrial Cardinals football
- Conference: Independent
- Record: 2–1
- Head coach: John C. Futrall (1st season)
- Captain: Wright Lindsey

1894 Southern college football independents records
	Conf.			Overall
Team	W	L	T	W		L		T
VMI		–		6	–	0	–	0
Hampden–Sydney		–		1	–	0	–	0
Tennessee		–		2	–	0	–	2
Vanderbilt		–		7	–	1	–	0
Ole Miss		–		6	–	1	–	0
Texas		–		6	–	1	–	0
Georgia		–		5	–	1	–	0
Kentucky State College		–		5	–	1	–	0
VAMC		–		4	–	1	–	0
Virginia		–		8	–	2	–	0
Centre		–		3	–	1	–	0
Alabama		–		3	–	1	–	0
Navy		–		4	–	1	–	2
North Carolina		–		6	–	3	–	0
Arkansas		–		2	–	1	–	0
LSU		–		2	–	1	–	0
West Virginia		–		2	–	2	–	0
Texas A&M		–		1	–	1	–	0
Delaware		–		1	–	1	–	0
Georgetown		–		4	–	5	–	0
Sewanee		–		3	–	4	–	0
Auburn		–		1	–	3	–	0
Johns Hopkins		–		1	–	4	–	1
Richmond		–		0	–	4	–	2
Centenary		–		0	–	1	–	0
Trinity (NC)		–		0	–	1	–	0
William & Mary		–		0	–	1	–	0
North Carolina A&M		–		0	–	2	–	0
South Carolina		–		0	–	2	–	0
Georgia Tech		–		0	–	3	–	0
Tulane		–		0	–	4	–	0

The 1894 Arkansas Industrial Cardinals football team represented the University of Arkansas during the 1894 college football season. On November 29, Thanksgiving Day, and after playing two games in October against Fort Smith High School, Arkansas Industrial played its first inter-collegiate football game against Texas Longhorns of the University of Texas. The game was played in Austin, Texas, before a crowd of 1,500 persons. Texas easily defeated Arkansas by a 54 to 0 score. The starting lineup in the Texas game was: H. D. Moore (right end); Campbell (right tackle); Braswell (right guard); James (center rush); Rogers (left guard); Kobel (left tackle); Mook (left end); Lindsay (quarterback); McDaniel (right halfback); Hayden (left halfback); and Ward (fullback). Professor John C. Futrall was the team's 21-year-old "manager". At the beginning of his tenure, Futrall was a recent graduate of the school. He later served as the university's president for 25 years from 1894 until his death in 1939.

== Schedule ==
Date	Opponent	Site	Result	Attendance	Source
October 13	Fort Smith High School	Fayetteville, AR	W 42–0		
October 27	at Fort Smith High School	Fort Smith, AR	W 38–0		
November 29	at Texas	Hyde Park; Austin, TX (rivalry)	L 0–54	1,500	
