= 1894 North Carolina Tar Heels football team =

American college football season

1894 North Carolina Tar Heels football
- Conference: Independent
- Record: 6–3
- Head coach: Vernon K. Irvine (1st season)
- Captain: Charles Baskerville
- Home stadium: Campus Athletic Field (I)

1894 Southern college football independents records
	Conf.			Overall
Team	W	L	T	W		L		T
VMI		–		6	–	0	–	0
Hampden–Sydney		–		1	–	0	–	0
Tennessee		–		2	–	0	–	2
Vanderbilt		–		7	–	1	–	0
Ole Miss		–		6	–	1	–	0
Texas		–		6	–	1	–	0
Georgia		–		5	–	1	–	0
Kentucky State College		–		5	–	1	–	0
VAMC		–		4	–	1	–	0
Virginia		–		8	–	2	–	0
Centre		–		3	–	1	–	0
Alabama		–		3	–	1	–	0
Navy		–		4	–	1	–	2
North Carolina		–		6	–	3	–	0
Arkansas		–		2	–	1	–	0
LSU		–		2	–	1	–	0
West Virginia		–		2	–	2	–	0
Texas A&M		–		1	–	1	–	0
Delaware		–		1	–	1	–	0
Georgetown		–		4	–	5	–	0
Sewanee		–		3	–	4	–	0
Auburn		–		1	–	3	–	0
Johns Hopkins		–		1	–	4	–	1
Richmond		–		0	–	4	–	2
Centenary		–		0	–	1	–	0
Trinity (NC)		–		0	–	1	–	0
William & Mary		–		0	–	1	–	0
North Carolina A&M		–		0	–	2	–	0
South Carolina		–		0	–	2	–	0
Georgia Tech		–		0	–	3	–	0
Tulane		–		0	–	4	–	0

The 1894 North Carolina Tar Heels football team represented the University of North Carolina in the 1894 college football season. They played nine games with a final record of 6–3. The team captain for the 1894 season was Charles Baskerville.

Because Trinity (Duke) suspended play of intercollegiate football this season's contest was the last one until 1922.

== Schedule ==
Date	Time	Opponent	Site	Result	Attendance	Source
October 12		North Carolina A&M	Campus Athletic Field (I); Chapel Hill, NC (rivalry)	W 44–0	300	
October 20	2:15 p.m.	at North Carolina A&M	Athletic Park; Raleigh, NC	W 16–0		
October 24	2:50 p.m.	Trinity (NC)	Campus Athletic Field (I); Chapel Hill, NC (rivalry)	W 28–0		
October 27	3:30 p.m.	vs. Sewanee	Allandale Field; Asheville, NC	W 36–4		
October 31		at Lehigh	Athletic Grounds; South Bethlehem, PA	L 6–24		
November 1	3:45 p.m.	at Rutgers	Neilson Field; New Brunswick, NJ	L 0–5		
November 3	4:00 p.m.	at Georgetown	Georgetown Field; Washington DC	W 20–4	300	
November 10		vs. Richmond	Athletic Park; Greensboro, NC	W 28–0		
November 29	3:30 p.m.	vs. Virginia	West-End Park; Richmond, VA (South's Oldest Rivalry)	L 0–34	6,000	
