= 1894 Tulane Olive and Blue football team =

American college football season

1894 Tulane Olive and Blue football
- Conference: Independent
- Record: 0–4
- Head coach: Fred Sweet (1st season)
- Captain: Edward Nelson
- Home stadium: Sportsman's Park

1894 Southern college football independents records
| | Conf. | | | Overall |
| Team | W | L | T | W | | L | | T |
|---|---|---|---|---|---|---|---|---|
| VMI | | – | | 6 | – | 0 | – | 0 |
| Hampden–Sydney | | – | | 1 | – | 0 | – | 0 |
| Tennessee | | – | | 2 | – | 0 | – | 2 |
| Vanderbilt | | – | | 7 | – | 1 | – | 0 |
| Ole Miss | | – | | 6 | – | 1 | – | 0 |
| Texas | | – | | 6 | – | 1 | – | 0 |
| Georgia | | – | | 5 | – | 1 | – | 0 |
| Kentucky State College | | – | | 5 | – | 1 | – | 0 |
| VAMC | | – | | 4 | – | 1 | – | 0 |
| Virginia | | – | | 8 | – | 2 | – | 0 |
| Centre | | – | | 3 | – | 1 | – | 0 |
| Alabama | | – | | 3 | – | 1 | – | 0 |
| Navy | | – | | 4 | – | 1 | – | 2 |
| North Carolina | | – | | 6 | – | 3 | – | 0 |
| Arkansas | | – | | 2 | – | 1 | – | 0 |
| LSU | | – | | 2 | – | 1 | – | 0 |
| West Virginia | | – | | 2 | – | 2 | – | 0 |
| Texas A&M | | – | | 1 | – | 1 | – | 0 |
| Delaware | | – | | 1 | – | 1 | – | 0 |
| Georgetown | | – | | 4 | – | 5 | – | 0 |
| Sewanee | | – | | 3 | – | 4 | – | 0 |
| Auburn | | – | | 1 | – | 3 | – | 0 |
| Johns Hopkins | | – | | 1 | – | 4 | – | 1 |
| Richmond | | – | | 0 | – | 4 | – | 2 |
| Centenary | | – | | 0 | – | 1 | – | 0 |
| Trinity (NC) | | – | | 0 | – | 1 | – | 0 |
| William & Mary | | – | | 0 | – | 1 | – | 0 |
| North Carolina A&M | | – | | 0 | – | 2 | – | 0 |
| South Carolina | | – | | 0 | – | 2 | – | 0 |
| Georgia Tech | | – | | 0 | – | 3 | – | 0 |
| Tulane | | – | | 0 | – | 4 | – | 0 |

The 1894 Tulane Olive and Blue football team represented Tulane University as an independent during the 1894 college football season. Led by Fred Sweet in his first and only season as head coach, Tulane compiled a record of 0–4.

== Schedule ==
| Date | Time | Opponent | Site | Result | Source |
|---|---|---|---|---|---|
| October 27 | 4:30 p.m. | at Texas | Hyde Park; Austin, TX | L 0–12 | |
| November 3 | | Alabama | Sportsman's Park; New Orleans, LA | L 6–18 | |
| November 17 | | Sewanee | Sportsman's Park; New Orleans, LA | L 6–12 | |
| November 29 | | Ole Miss | Sportsman's Park; New Orleans, LA (rivalry) | L 2–8 | |
