= Joseph Massie (American football) =

American football player and coach (1871–1922)

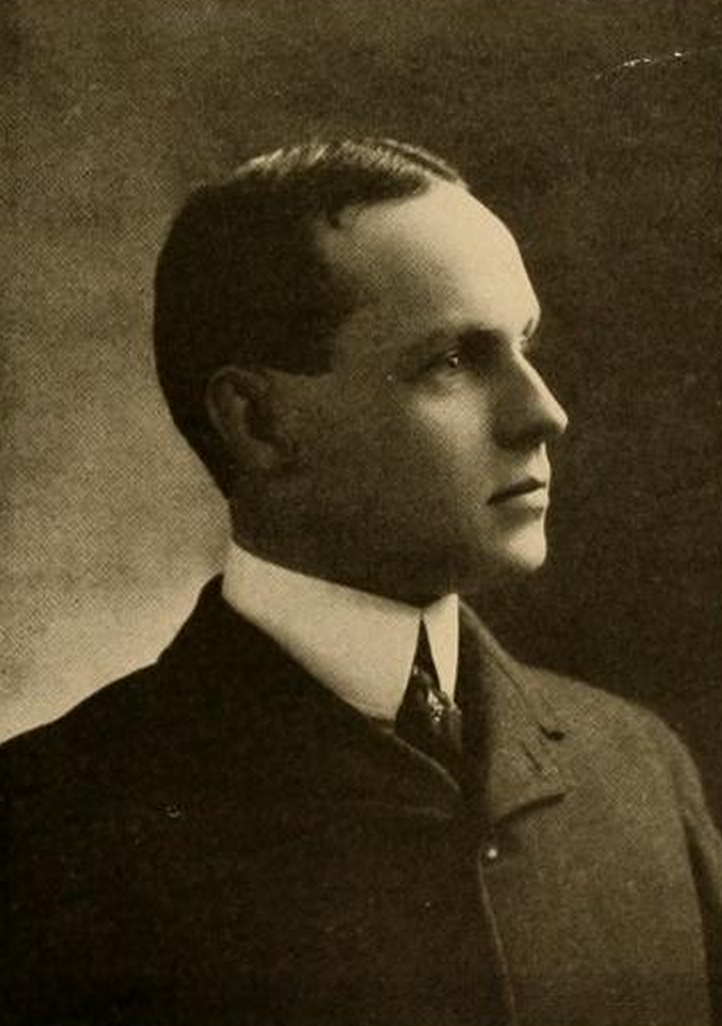
- Massie pictured c. early 1900s

Biographical details
- Born: September 24, 1871; Warren County, Virginia, U.S.
- Died: September 24, 1922 (aged 51); Newport News, Virginia, U.S.

Playing career
- 1892–1893: Virginia
- Position: Guard

Coaching career (HC unless noted)
- 1894: VAMC
- 1898: Virginia

Head coaching record
- Overall: 10–6

Joseph Anderson "Ike" Massie (September 24, 1871 – September 24, 1922) was an American college football player and coach. He served as the head football coach at Virginia Agricultural and Mechanical College, now known as Virginia Tech, in 1894 and at the University of Virginia in 1898, compiling a career head coaching record of 10–7. He was later City Attorney of Newport News, Virginia. He died on his birthday, in 1922.

== Head coaching record ==
Year	Team	Overall	Conference	Standing	Bowl/playoffs
VAMC (Independent) (1894)
1894	VAMC	4–1			
VAMC:		4–1			
Virginia Orange and Blue (Independent) (1898)
1898	Virginia	6–5			
Virginia:		6–5			
Total:		10–6			
