= Bob Carmody (American football) =

American college football player and coach, physician (1870–1899)

Biographical details
- Born: 1870
- Died: December 31, 1899; Sayre, Pennsylvania, U.S.

Playing career

Football
- 1891: Fordham
- 1892–1893: Georgetown

Baseball
- c. 1893: Georgetown
- Positions: End, fullback, halfback (football); Pitcher (baseball)

Coaching career (HC unless noted)

Football
- 1894: Georgetown
- 1897: Fordham

Head coaching record
- Overall: 7–7–1

Robert Francis Carmody (1870 – December 31, 1899) was an American college football player and coach, college baseball player, and physician. He served as the head football coach at Georgetown University in 1894 and co-head football coach at Fordham University in 1897 with Frederick Shaeffer, compiling a career head coaching record of 7–7–1.

Carmody played football at Fordham as a halfback. At Georgetown, he played at fullback and end, and was captain of the 1892 Georgetown football team. Carmody was also a pitcher for the Georgetown Hoyas baseball team. In 1896, he was a resident physician at Robert Packer Hospital in Sayre, Pennsylvania. Carmody died at the age of 29, on December 31, 1899, at his home in Sayre. He had suffered from Bright's disease.

== Head coaching record ==
Year	Team	Overall	Conference	Standing	Bowl/playoffs
Georgetown (Independent) (1894)
1894	Georgetown	4–5			
Georgetown:		4–5			
Fordham (Independent) (1897)
1897	Fordham	3–2–1			
Fordham:		3–2–1			
Total:		7–7–1			
