= 1894 Navy Midshipmen football team =

American college football season

1894 Navy Midshipmen football
- Conference: Independent
- Record: 4–1–2
- Head coach: William Wurtenburg (1st season)
- Captain: Mike McCormick
- Home stadium: Worden Field

1894 Southern college football independents records
	Conf.			Overall
Team	W	L	T	W		L		T
VMI		–		6	–	0	–	0
Hampden–Sydney		–		1	–	0	–	0
Tennessee		–		2	–	0	–	2
Vanderbilt		–		7	–	1	–	0
Ole Miss		–		6	–	1	–	0
Texas		–		6	–	1	–	0
Georgia		–		5	–	1	–	0
Kentucky State College		–		5	–	1	–	0
VAMC		–		4	–	1	–	0
Virginia		–		8	–	2	–	0
Centre		–		3	–	1	–	0
Alabama		–		3	–	1	–	0
Navy		–		4	–	1	–	2
North Carolina		–		6	–	3	–	0
Arkansas		–		2	–	1	–	0
LSU		–		2	–	1	–	0
West Virginia		–		2	–	2	–	0
Texas A&M		–		1	–	1	–	0
Delaware		–		1	–	1	–	0
Georgetown		–		4	–	5	–	0
Sewanee		–		3	–	4	–	0
Auburn		–		1	–	3	–	0
Johns Hopkins		–		1	–	4	–	1
Richmond		–		0	–	4	–	2
Centenary		–		0	–	1	–	0
Trinity (NC)		–		0	–	1	–	0
William & Mary		–		0	–	1	–	0
North Carolina A&M		–		0	–	2	–	0
South Carolina		–		0	–	2	–	0
Georgia Tech		–		0	–	3	–	0
Tulane		–		0	–	4	–	0

The 1894 Navy Midshipmen football team represented the United States Naval Academy during the 1894 college football season. In their first and only season under head coach William Wurtenburg, the Midshipmen compiled a 4–1–2 record, shut out three opponents, and outscored all opponents by a combined score of 72 to 30. The Army–Navy Game was canceled due to Presidential cabinet order.

== Schedule ==
Date	Opponent	Site	Result	Source
October 6	Elizabeth Athletic Club	Worden Field; Annapolis, MD	T 6–6	
October 21	Georgetown	Worden Field; Annapolis, MD	W 12–0	
October 27	Penn	Worden Field; Annapolis, MD	L 0–12	
October 31	Carlisle	Worden Field; Annapolis, MD	W 8–0	
November 3	Lehigh	Worden Field; Annapolis, MD	W 10–0	
November 10	Penn State	Worden Field; Annapolis, MD	T 6–6	
November 24	Baltimore City College	Worden Field; Annapolis, MD	W 30–6	
