= 1894 VAMC football team =

American college football season

1894 VAMC football
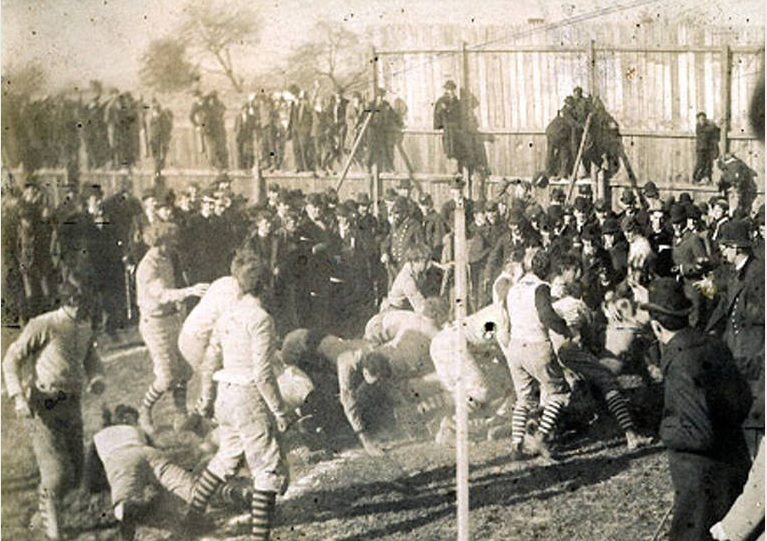
- VMI vs. VAMC game, 1894
- Conference: Independent
- Record: 4–1
- Head coach: Joseph Massie (1st season)
- Captain: Tarpley Douglas Martin
- Home stadium: Sheib Field

1894 Southern college football independents records
	Conf.			Overall
Team	W	L	T	W		L		T
VMI		–		6	–	0	–	0
Hampden–Sydney		–		1	–	0	–	0
Tennessee		–		2	–	0	–	2
Vanderbilt		–		7	–	1	–	0
Ole Miss		–		6	–	1	–	0
Texas		–		6	–	1	–	0
Georgia		–		5	–	1	–	0
Kentucky State College		–		5	–	1	–	0
VAMC		–		4	–	1	–	0
Virginia		–		8	–	2	–	0
Centre		–		3	–	1	–	0
Alabama		–		3	–	1	–	0
Navy		–		4	–	1	–	2
North Carolina		–		6	–	3	–	0
Arkansas		–		2	–	1	–	0
LSU		–		2	–	1	–	0
West Virginia		–		2	–	2	–	0
Texas A&M		–		1	–	1	–	0
Delaware		–		1	–	1	–	0
Georgetown		–		4	–	5	–	0
Sewanee		–		3	–	4	–	0
Auburn		–		1	–	3	–	0
Johns Hopkins		–		1	–	4	–	1
Richmond		–		0	–	4	–	2
Centenary		–		0	–	1	–	0
Trinity (NC)		–		0	–	1	–	0
William & Mary		–		0	–	1	–	0
North Carolina A&M		–		0	–	2	–	0
South Carolina		–		0	–	2	–	0
Georgia Tech		–		0	–	3	–	0
Tulane		–		0	–	4	–	0

The 1894 VAMC football team represented Virginia Agricultural and Mechanical College in the 1894 college football season. The team was led by their head coach Joseph Massie and finished with a record of four wins and one loss (4–1).

== Schedule ==
Date	Time	Opponent	Site	Result	Attendance	Source
October 20		Emory and Henry	Sheib Field; Blacksburg, VA	W 16–0	400	
October 29	2:00 p.m.	Roanoke	Sheib Field; Blacksburg, VA	W 36–0	500	
November 10	3:00 p.m.	St. Albans Lutheran Boys School	Sheib Field; Blacksburg, VA	W 42–0		
November 17	3:30 p.m.	at St. Albans Lutheran Boys School	Radford, VA	W 12–0		
November 29	10:30 a.m.	vs. VMI	Athletic Park; Staunton, VA (rivalry)	L 6–10	600-1,500	

== Game summaries ==
=== Emory and Henry ===
Emory & Henry vs. VAMC

Team	1	2	Total
E&M	0	0	0
• VAMC	4	12	16

- Date: October 20, 1894
- Location: Sheib Field
  Blacksburg, VA
- Game attendance: 400
- Referee: Cadet Waddy

VAMC played their first game of the year on October 20, 1894, against Emory and Henry College at their new athletic field, Sheib Field, in front of 400 spectators. VAMC won the toss and scored their first touchdown three minutes into the game, with VAMC halfback Harvey running into the end zone, and R. N. Watts missing the extra point. Harvey two more touchdowns in the second half, with Watts converts both extra points. Due to injuries to the Emory squad, the second half was not completed and VAMC won the game.

The starting lineup for VAMC was: Porcher (left end), Johnson (left tackle), Hart (left guard), Stull (center), Patrick (right guard), Watts (right tackle), Dashiell (right end), Massie (quarterback), Harvey (left halfback), Guignard (right halfback), Martin (fullback).

The starting lineup for Emory and Henry was: John Taylor (left end), Frank Pyott (left tackle), James Tarter (left guard), David Collins (center), Charles Hounshell (right guard), Lacon Carlock (right tackle), James Frazier (right end), W. H. Pyott (quarterback), Holloman (left halfback), Edward Pyott (right halfback), George McNeil (fullback). The substitutes were: Johnson and James Young.

=== Roanoke ===
Roanoke vs. VAMC

Team	1	2	Total
Roanoke	0	0	0
• VAMC	18	18	36

- Date: October 29, 1894
- Location: Sheib Field
  Blacksburg, VA
- Game start: 2:00 p.m.
- Game attendance: 500
- Referee: Cadet Waddy

On October 29, 1894, VAMC played its second game of the year, which was a win over Roanoke College, 36–0. The game was played in front of 500 spectators.

=== St. Albans (first game) ===
VAMC played St. Albans Boys Lutheran School on November 10, 1894, and won 42–0, which was then the most points scored against an opponent in Blacksburg. VAMC halfback Christopher Guignard recorded two eighty-yard runs during the game, who also scored three touchdowns. The other touchdowns were scored by T. D. Martin, N. R. Patrick, H. A. Johnson, and Harvey, with R. N. Watts converting seven extra points.

The starting lineup for VAMC was: Fraser (left end), J. E. Johnson (left tackle), James (left guard), Stull (center), Patrick (right guard), Watts (right tackle), Dashiell (right end), Massie (quarterback), Harvey (left halfback), Guignard (right halfback), Martin (fullback).

The starting lineup for St. Albans was: J. Edgar Bell (left end), W. Wilson Mallory (left tackle), S. Brown (left guard), P. H. Brooks (center), C. C. Frazier (right guard), A. B. McLendon (right tackle), C. A. Bell (right end), M. M. McGuire (quarterback), William Kenan (left halfback), David Moore (right halfback), Robert Marshall (fullback).

=== St. Albans (second game) ===
VAMC at St. Albans

Team	1	2	Total
• VAMC	6	6	12
St. Albans	0	0	0

- Date: November 17, 1894
- Location: Radford, VA
- Game start: 3:30 p.m.
- Game weather: Heavy rain
- Referee: Cadet Waddy

On November 17, 1894, VAMC played a second game against St. Albans in Radford, Virginia. The game was played in pouring rain and VAMC won 12–0, scoring a touchdown in both halves.

The starting lineup for VAMC was: Dashiell (left end), Johnson (left tackle), James (left guard), Stull (center), Patrick (right guard), Norfleet (right tackle), Fraser (right end), Massie (quarterback), Guignard (left halfback), Harvey (right halfback), Martin (fullback).

The starting lineup for St. Albans was: J. Edgar Bell (left end), C. C. Frazier (left tackle), J. Lawrence Orr (left guard), P. H. Brooks (center), E. W. McNeil (right guard), A. B. McLendon (right tackle), C. A. Bell (right end), M. M. McGuire (quarterback), William Kenan (left halfback), William Shibley (right halfback), Robert Marshall (fullback).

=== VMI ===
VMI vs. VAMC

Team	1	2	Total
• VMI	6	4	10
VAMC	6	0	6

- Date: November 29, 1894
- Location: Athletic Park
  Staunton, VA
- Game start: 10:30 a.m.
- Game attendance: 600-1,500
- Referee: Zerr

VAMC played against Virginia Military Institute in Staunton, Virginia on November 29, 1894. The two teams were led to the grounds by the Stonewall Brigade Band. VAMC recorded their only loss of the season, losing 6–10. VMI quarterback Sidney Foster scored on an eighty-yard touchdown run. One report reads "The Blacksburg team played brilliantly and had it not been for two rank decisions by the umpire and referee, the score would have been reversed."

The starting lineup for VAMC was: Fraser (left end), Johnson (left tackle), James (left guard), Stull (center), Patrick (right guard), Hart (right tackle), Dashiell (right end), Massie (quarterback), Harvey (left halfback), Guignard (right halfback), Martin (fullback). The substitutes were: Norfleet, Porcher, Staples and Watts.

The starting lineup for VMI was: James Jones (left end), Steuben Stratton (left tackle), Richard Poindexter (left guard), Peyton Locker (center), G. Rogers (right guard), Charles Michel (right tackle), Miles Selden (right end), Sidney Foster (quarterback), H. McMullen (left halfback), Charles Dickinson (right halfback), John Twiggs (fullback). The substitutes were: Richard Lawson, James McCaw, William Peterson, Goldsborough Serpell, Stevens, William Twiggs, Alfred Vaughan and John Wise.

== Players ==
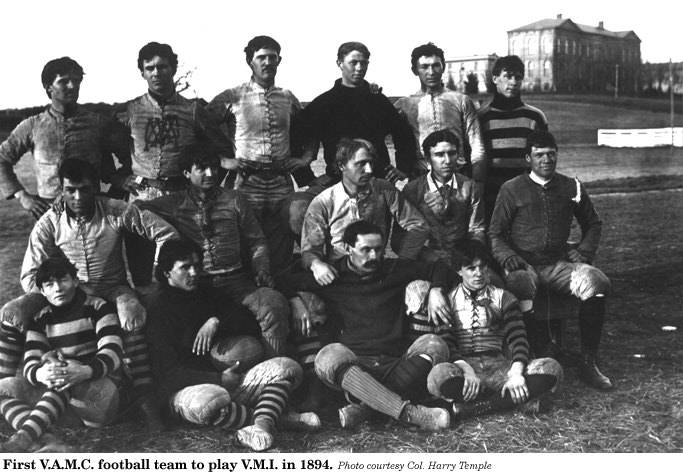
The 1894 V.A.M.C. football team

The following players were members of the 1894 football team according to the roster published in the 1895 and 1903 editions of The Bugle, the Virginia Tech yearbook.

VAMC 1894 roster
Quarterback: Joseph Massie; Guards: Miles Taylor Hart; William Lewis James; Nerbon Robert Patrick; Tackles: Howard Archer Johnson; Paul Judson Norfleet; R. N. Watts	Center: John Walter Stull; Ends: Thomas Edward Dashiell; Samuel Sidney "Sid" Fraser; Christopher Gadsden Porcher; Halfbacks: Christopher Gadsden Guignard; Urban Harvey; Fullback: Tarpley Douglas Martin (Capt.)	Substitutes: Alexander Parker Eskridge; Leslie Wallace Jerrell; John Ingles Palmer; John William Sample; G. W. Staples

== Coaching and training staff ==
- Head coach/Player: Joseph Massie
- Manager: H. Basil Pratt, Jr.
- Assistant manager: S. Vance Lovenstein
- Medical adviser: William F. Henderson, MD
