= 1894 South Carolina Gamecocks football team =

American college football season

1894 South Carolina Gamecocks football
- Conference: Independent
- Record: 0–2
- Head coach: None
- Captain: D. H. Wallace
- Home stadium: State Fairgrounds

1894 Southern college football independents records
	Conf.			Overall
Team	W	L	T	W		L		T
VMI		–		6	–	0	–	0
Hampden–Sydney		–		1	–	0	–	0
Tennessee		–		2	–	0	–	2
Vanderbilt		–		7	–	1	–	0
Ole Miss		–		6	–	1	–	0
Texas		–		6	–	1	–	0
Georgia		–		5	–	1	–	0
Kentucky State College		–		5	–	1	–	0
VAMC		–		4	–	1	–	0
Virginia		–		8	–	2	–	0
Centre		–		3	–	1	–	0
Alabama		–		3	–	1	–	0
Navy		–		4	–	1	–	2
North Carolina		–		6	–	3	–	0
Arkansas		–		2	–	1	–	0
LSU		–		2	–	1	–	0
West Virginia		–		2	–	2	–	0
Texas A&M		–		1	–	1	–	0
Delaware		–		1	–	1	–	0
Georgetown		–		4	–	5	–	0
Sewanee		–		3	–	4	–	0
Auburn		–		1	–	3	–	0
Johns Hopkins		–		1	–	4	–	1
Richmond		–		0	–	4	–	2
Centenary		–		0	–	1	–	0
Trinity (NC)		–		0	–	1	–	0
William & Mary		–		0	–	1	–	0
North Carolina A&M		–		0	–	2	–	0
South Carolina		–		0	–	2	–	0
Georgia Tech		–		0	–	3	–	0
Tulane		–		0	–	4	–	0

The 1894 South Carolina Jaguars football team represented South Carolina College—now known as the University of South Carolina–as an independent during the 1894 college football season. South Carolina compiled a record of 0–2. Home games were played on the athletic field at the State Fairgrounds on Elmwood Avenue in Columbia, South Carolina.

== Schedule ==
Date	Opponent	Site	Result	Attendance	Source
November 3	Georgia	State Fairgrounds; Columbia, SC (rivalry)	L 0–40	500	
November 10	Augusta YMCA	State Fairgrounds; Columbia, SC	L 4–16		
