= 1894 Virginia Orange and Blue football team =

American college football season

1894 Virginia Orange and Blue football

Southern champion
- Conference: Independent
- Record: 8–2
- Head coach: Johnny Poe (2nd season)
- Captain: John Penton
- Home stadium: Madison Hall Field

1894 Southern college football independents records
	Conf.			Overall
Team	W	L	T	W		L		T
VMI		–		6	–	0	–	0
Hampden–Sydney		–		1	–	0	–	0
Tennessee		–		2	–	0	–	2
Vanderbilt		–		7	–	1	–	0
Ole Miss		–		6	–	1	–	0
Texas		–		6	–	1	–	0
Georgia		–		5	–	1	–	0
Kentucky State College		–		5	–	1	–	0
VAMC		–		4	–	1	–	0
Virginia		–		8	–	2	–	0
Centre		–		3	–	1	–	0
Alabama		–		3	–	1	–	0
Navy		–		4	–	1	–	2
North Carolina		–		6	–	3	–	0
Arkansas		–		2	–	1	–	0
LSU		–		2	–	1	–	0
West Virginia		–		2	–	2	–	0
Texas A&M		–		1	–	1	–	0
Delaware		–		1	–	1	–	0
Georgetown		–		4	–	5	–	0
Sewanee		–		3	–	4	–	0
Auburn		–		1	–	3	–	0
Johns Hopkins		–		1	–	4	–	1
Richmond		–		0	–	4	–	2
Centenary		–		0	–	1	–	0
Trinity (NC)		–		0	–	1	–	0
William & Mary		–		0	–	1	–	0
North Carolina A&M		–		0	–	2	–	0
South Carolina		–		0	–	2	–	0
Georgia Tech		–		0	–	3	–	0
Tulane		–		0	–	4	–	0

The 1894 Virginia Orange and Blue football team represented the University of Virginia as an independent during the 1894 college football season. Led by second-year coach Johnny Poe, the team went 8–2 and claims a Southern championship.

== Schedule ==
Date	Time	Opponent	Site	Result	Attendance	Source
October 2		Richmond	Madison Hall Field; Charlottesville, VA	W 48–0		
October 6		Baltimore City College	Madison Hall Field; Charlottesville, VA	W 36–0		
October 15	2:00 p.m.	vs. Princeton	Catonsville Country Cub; Catonsville, MD	L 0–12		
October 18		at Richmond	West-End Park; Richmond, VA	W 28–0		
October 20		Johns Hopkins	Madison Hall Field; Charlottesville, VA	W 76–0		
October 26		vs. Penn	National Park; Washington, DC	L 6–14	2,500	
November 3		Rutgers	Madison Hall Field; Charlottesville, VA	W 20–4		
November 13		Fort Monroe	Madison Hall Field; Charlottesville, VA	W 102–0		
November 20		West Philadelphia Athletic Club	Madison Hall Field; Charlottesville, VA	W 64–0		
November 29		vs. North Carolina	West-End Park; Richmond, VA (rivalry)	W 34–0	6,000	
