= 1894 Georgia Bulldogs football team =

American college football season

1894 Georgia Bulldogs football
- Conference: Independent
- Record: 5–1
- Head coach: Robert Winston (1st season)
- Captain: George Butler
- Home stadium: Herty Field

1894 Southern college football independents records
	Conf.			Overall
Team	W	L	T	W		L		T
VMI		–		6	–	0	–	0
Hampden–Sydney		–		1	–	0	–	0
Tennessee		–		2	–	0	–	2
Vanderbilt		–		7	–	1	–	0
Ole Miss		–		6	–	1	–	0
Texas		–		6	–	1	–	0
Georgia		–		5	–	1	–	0
Kentucky State College		–		5	–	1	–	0
VAMC		–		4	–	1	–	0
Virginia		–		8	–	2	–	0
Centre		–		3	–	1	–	0
Alabama		–		3	–	1	–	0
Navy		–		4	–	1	–	2
North Carolina		–		6	–	3	–	0
Arkansas		–		2	–	1	–	0
LSU		–		2	–	1	–	0
West Virginia		–		2	–	2	–	0
Texas A&M		–		1	–	1	–	0
Delaware		–		1	–	1	–	0
Georgetown		–		4	–	5	–	0
Sewanee		–		3	–	4	–	0
Auburn		–		1	–	3	–	0
Johns Hopkins		–		1	–	4	–	1
Richmond		–		0	–	4	–	2
Centenary		–		0	–	1	–	0
Trinity (NC)		–		0	–	1	–	0
William & Mary		–		0	–	1	–	0
North Carolina A&M		–		0	–	2	–	0
South Carolina		–		0	–	2	–	0
Georgia Tech		–		0	–	3	–	0
Tulane		–		0	–	4	–	0

The 1894 Georgia Bulldogs football team represented the University of Georgia in the 1894 college football season and completed the year with a 5–1–record. In 1894, the Bulldogs played their first game against South Carolina, won 40–0, and started a rivalry that continues to the present day. Georgia also secured its first victory over Auburn. This was the team's one and only season under the guidance of head coach Robert Winston. Winston was the first paid coach for the Bulldogs.

== Schedule ==
Date	Opponent	Site	Result	Attendance	Source
October 29	Sewanee	Herty Field; Athens, GA	L 8–12		
November 3	at South Carolina	State Fairgrounds; Columbia, SC (rivalry)	W 40–0	500	
November 10	at Wofford	Spartanburg, SC	W 10–0		
November 17	at Augusta A. C.	Augusta, GA	W 66–0		
November 24	vs. Auburn	Piedmont Park; Atlanta, GA (Deep South's Oldest Rivalry)	W 10–8	2,000	
November 29	at Savannah Athletic Association	Bolton Street Park; Savannah, GA	W 22–0	> 1,000	

== Additional sources ==
- Reed, Thomas Walter (c. 1949). "Athletics at the University from the Beginning Through 1947". History of the University of Georgia. dlg.galileo.usg.edu. pp. 3432–3438.
- "Georgia Football History: Former Head Coaches". georgiadogs.com. Archived from the original on December 31, 2010.
