= 1894 Ole Miss Rebels football team =

American college football season

1894 Ole Miss Rebels football
- Conference: Independent
- Record: 6–1
- Head coach: J. W. S. Rhea / Charles Dow Clark (1st season)

1894 Southern college football independents records
| | Conf. | | | Overall |
| Team | W | L | T | W | | L | | T |
|---|---|---|---|---|---|---|---|---|
| VMI | | – | | 6 | – | 0 | – | 0 |
| Hampden–Sydney | | – | | 1 | – | 0 | – | 0 |
| Tennessee | | – | | 2 | – | 0 | – | 2 |
| Vanderbilt | | – | | 7 | – | 1 | – | 0 |
| Ole Miss | | – | | 6 | – | 1 | – | 0 |
| Texas | | – | | 6 | – | 1 | – | 0 |
| Georgia | | – | | 5 | – | 1 | – | 0 |
| Kentucky State College | | – | | 5 | – | 1 | – | 0 |
| VAMC | | – | | 4 | – | 1 | – | 0 |
| Virginia | | – | | 8 | – | 2 | – | 0 |
| Centre | | – | | 3 | – | 1 | – | 0 |
| Alabama | | – | | 3 | – | 1 | – | 0 |
| Navy | | – | | 4 | – | 1 | – | 2 |
| North Carolina | | – | | 6 | – | 3 | – | 0 |
| Arkansas | | – | | 2 | – | 1 | – | 0 |
| LSU | | – | | 2 | – | 1 | – | 0 |
| West Virginia | | – | | 2 | – | 2 | – | 0 |
| Texas A&M | | – | | 1 | – | 1 | – | 0 |
| Delaware | | – | | 1 | – | 1 | – | 0 |
| Georgetown | | – | | 4 | – | 5 | – | 0 |
| Sewanee | | – | | 3 | – | 4 | – | 0 |
| Auburn | | – | | 1 | – | 3 | – | 0 |
| Johns Hopkins | | – | | 1 | – | 4 | – | 1 |
| Richmond | | – | | 0 | – | 4 | – | 2 |
| Centenary | | – | | 0 | – | 1 | – | 0 |
| Trinity (NC) | | – | | 0 | – | 1 | – | 0 |
| William & Mary | | – | | 0 | – | 1 | – | 0 |
| North Carolina A&M | | – | | 0 | – | 2 | – | 0 |
| South Carolina | | – | | 0 | – | 2 | – | 0 |
| Georgia Tech | | – | | 0 | – | 3 | – | 0 |
| Tulane | | – | | 0 | – | 4 | – | 0 |

The 1894 Ole Miss Rebels football team represented the University of Mississippi as an independent during the 1894 college football season. The season's only loss was to Vanderbilt.

== Schedule ==
| Date | Opponent | Site | Result | Source |
|---|---|---|---|---|
| October 20 | St. Thomas Hall | Oxford, MS | W 60–0 | |
| October 27 | Alabama | Fairgrounds; Jackson, MS | W 6–0 | |
| November 10 | at Vanderbilt | Dudley Field; Nashville, TN | L 0–40 | |
| November 12 | at Cumberland (TN) | Cumberland, TN | Cancelled | |
| November 17 | at Memphis Athletic Club | Citizens' Baseball Park; Memphis, TN | W 12–0 | |
| November 29 | at Tulane | Sportsman's Park; New Orleans, LA | W 8–2 | |
| December 1 | at Southern Athletic Club | Sportsman's Park; New Orleans, LA | W 6–0 | |
| December 3 | at LSU | State Field; Baton Rouge, LA (rivalry) | W 26–6 | |
