= 1894 Vanderbilt Commodores football team =

American college football season

1894 Vanderbilt Commodores football
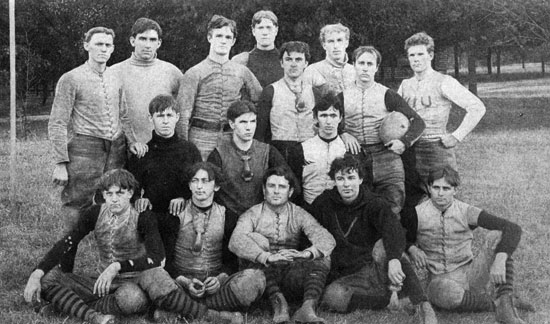
- Conference: Independent
- Record: 7–1
- Head coach: Henry Worth Thornton (1st season)
- Captain: W. J. Keller
- Home stadium: Dudley Field

1894 Southern college football independents records
| | Conf. | | | Overall |
| Team | W | L | T | W | | L | | T |
|---|---|---|---|---|---|---|---|---|
| VMI | | – | | 6 | – | 0 | – | 0 |
| Hampden–Sydney | | – | | 1 | – | 0 | – | 0 |
| Tennessee | | – | | 2 | – | 0 | – | 2 |
| Vanderbilt | | – | | 7 | – | 1 | – | 0 |
| Ole Miss | | – | | 6 | – | 1 | – | 0 |
| Texas | | – | | 6 | – | 1 | – | 0 |
| Georgia | | – | | 5 | – | 1 | – | 0 |
| Kentucky State College | | – | | 5 | – | 1 | – | 0 |
| VAMC | | – | | 4 | – | 1 | – | 0 |
| Virginia | | – | | 8 | – | 2 | – | 0 |
| Centre | | – | | 3 | – | 1 | – | 0 |
| Alabama | | – | | 3 | – | 1 | – | 0 |
| Navy | | – | | 4 | – | 1 | – | 2 |
| North Carolina | | – | | 6 | – | 3 | – | 0 |
| Arkansas | | – | | 2 | – | 1 | – | 0 |
| LSU | | – | | 2 | – | 1 | – | 0 |
| West Virginia | | – | | 2 | – | 2 | – | 0 |
| Texas A&M | | – | | 1 | – | 1 | – | 0 |
| Delaware | | – | | 1 | – | 1 | – | 0 |
| Georgetown | | – | | 4 | – | 5 | – | 0 |
| Sewanee | | – | | 3 | – | 4 | – | 0 |
| Auburn | | – | | 1 | – | 3 | – | 0 |
| Johns Hopkins | | – | | 1 | – | 4 | – | 1 |
| Richmond | | – | | 0 | – | 4 | – | 2 |
| Centenary | | – | | 0 | – | 1 | – | 0 |
| Trinity (NC) | | – | | 0 | – | 1 | – | 0 |
| William & Mary | | – | | 0 | – | 1 | – | 0 |
| North Carolina A&M | | – | | 0 | – | 2 | – | 0 |
| South Carolina | | – | | 0 | – | 2 | – | 0 |
| Georgia Tech | | – | | 0 | – | 3 | – | 0 |
| Tulane | | – | | 0 | – | 4 | – | 0 |

The 1894 Vanderbilt Commodores football team represented Vanderbilt University as an independent during the 1894 college football season. The team's head coach was Henry Worth Thornton, who only coached one season in that capacity at Vanderbilt.

== Schedule ==
| Date | Time | Opponent | Site | Result | Attendance | Source |
|---|---|---|---|---|---|---|
| October 16 | 4:00 p.m. | at Memphis Athletic Club* | Citizens' Park; Memphis, TN | W 64–0 | 800 | |
| October 20 | | Centre | Dudley Field; Nashville, TN | W 6–0 | 1,200 | |
| October 27 | 3:35 p.m. | at Louisville Athletic Club | Louisville, KY | L 8–10 | 500 | |
| November 3 | | at Auburn | Riverside Park; Montgomery, AL | W 20–4 | | |
| November 10 | | Ole Miss | Dudley Field; Nashville, TN (rivalry) | W 40–0 | | |
| November 21 | | Central (KY) | Dudley Field; Nashville, TN | W 34–6 | 600 | |
| November 24 | | Cumberland (TN) | Dudley Field; Nashville, TN | W 62–0 | | |
| November 29 | | Sewanee | Dudley Field; Nashville, TN (rivalry) | W 12–0 | 4,000 | |
*Non-conference game; All times are in Central time

== Game summaries ==
In the third game of the season, against the Louisville Athletic Club, bad officiating calls against Vanderbilt lead to team captain W. J. Keller to pull his team off the field before the game was over in the second half and resulted in an 10–8 loss.

=== Louisville Athletic Club ===
The game was away in Louisville with a crowd of over 500 persons. The Nashville American gave this report:

"To say that the student body at Vanderbilt University were astonished at the news that their team had gone down in defeat before the Louisville Athletic Club Saturday is putting it mildly indeed. The Centre University team rolled up a score of 28-0 against Louisville Saturday before and Vanderbilt had beaten Centre College, considered the strongest team in Kentucky, by a score of 6-0. All this seemed to point with mathematical precision to the fact that Vanderbilt would have a walk-over. But, alast the ways of football are past finding out, and no man knows the result thereof."

"It is no wonder then that the surprise was profound and the conjectures as to the cause as numerous as they were unsatisfactory. But as bits of news came in the mystery began to clear up. First it was learned that Capt. Keller was ill and did not play in the game. The loss of their general and strongest player was very demoralizing to the team, but it was nothing compared to the behavior of the umpire, the referee and the linesman. The Vanderbilt team found no trouble in skirting the Louisville Athletic Club's ends for gains of 15 and 20 yards, but were almost invariably called back and the ball given to the Louisville Athletic Club and gave Vanderbilt no chance."

- (Note at the time a touchdown was worth 4 points and the conversion was 2 points.)

"In the second half Vanderbilt started with a rush and by a series of brilliant plays by Dortch, Gaines and Connell the ball was carried to Louisville Athletic Club's 12-yard line, but here the ball was given to Louisville Athletic Club on a foul. McDonald kicked 35 yards, but Vanderbilt lost the ball and 10 yards on a foul. Louisville Athletic Club then worked the ball up to the Vanderbilt 35-yard line where McDonald kicked it behind Vanderbilt's goal. It was brought out to the 25-yard line and Connell punted 40 yards. McDonald returned it 12 yards and Connell punted again for 60 yards. The ball was secured by Vanderbilt on the 8-yard line and Tuttle went through for the second touch-down. Connell missed the goal and the score was 8 to 0 in favor of Vanderbilt."

- The American added Coach Thornton's comments as:

"Only nine minutes were left in which to play. Connell kicked 50 yards from the center of the field, McDonald catching and returning 30 yards to Dortch. Gaines then went around left end for 5 yards, but was called back and the ball given to Louisville Athletic Club due to foul interference. The ball was then worked back to the five-yard line, and here Louisville Athletic Club was allowed to try for six downs, without gaining the necessary five yards and instead of surrendering the ball on third down as they should. On the seventh trial the ball was pushed out of bounds and behind the goal, the umpire declaring it a touch-down. The Vanderbilt team indignantly left the field, refusing to play out the remaining time. The goal was missed and the score was 10-8 in favor of Louisville Athletic Club."

- The Louisville newspaper also revealed a letter to their newspaper as:

"For the above reasons he also declined to accept the final score as the result of the match. The decisions objected to on the grounds of injustice are specifically on the part of the linesman in prolonging the game beyond the agreed time, thus allowing the Louisville team to score an extra touch-down, to this they were not entitled; on the part of the referee in permitting the same team to have seven downs without advancing the ball five yards when they should have only been allowed three downs, and in granting the Louisville Athletic Club a touch-down when the ball was really shoved out of bounds before the goal-line was passed, and finally on the part of the umpire in disqualifying a Vanderbilt player whose only offense was defending himself from the brutal assault of an opponent."

"In conclusion the Louisville Athletic Club followed the coach containing the Vanderbilt team several blocks, thereby going considerably out of their way for the express purpose of jeering a visiting team, one of whose members was seriously ill. Very respectfully, Henry W. Thornton."
