= 1894 Texas Longhorns football team =

American college football season

1894 Texas Longhorns football
- Conference: Independent
- Record: 6–1
- Head coach: Reginald DeMerritt Wentworth (1st season)
- Captain: Victor Moore
- Home stadium: Hyde Park

1894 Southern college football independents records
	Conf.			Overall
Team	W	L	T	W		L		T
VMI		–		6	–	0	–	0
Hampden–Sydney		–		1	–	0	–	0
Tennessee		–		2	–	0	–	2
Vanderbilt		–		7	–	1	–	0
Ole Miss		–		6	–	1	–	0
Texas		–		6	–	1	–	0
Georgia		–		5	–	1	–	0
Kentucky State College		–		5	–	1	–	0
VAMC		–		4	–	1	–	0
Virginia		–		8	–	2	–	0
Centre		–		3	–	1	–	0
Alabama		–		3	–	1	–	0
Navy		–		4	–	1	–	2
North Carolina		–		6	–	3	–	0
Arkansas		–		2	–	1	–	0
LSU		–		2	–	1	–	0
West Virginia		–		2	–	2	–	0
Texas A&M		–		1	–	1	–	0
Delaware		–		1	–	1	–	0
Georgetown		–		4	–	5	–	0
Sewanee		–		3	–	4	–	0
Auburn		–		1	–	3	–	0
Johns Hopkins		–		1	–	4	–	1
Richmond		–		0	–	4	–	2
Centenary		–		0	–	1	–	0
Trinity (NC)		–		0	–	1	–	0
William & Mary		–		0	–	1	–	0
North Carolina A&M		–		0	–	2	–	0
South Carolina		–		0	–	2	–	0
Georgia Tech		–		0	–	3	–	0
Tulane		–		0	–	4	–	0

The 1894 Texas Varsity football team represented The University of Texas (now known as the University of Texas at Austin Longhorns) in the 1894 college football season. The team was led by Reginald DeMerritt Wentworth, the first head coach in Longhorn history, in his first and only season as coach. Texas compiled a record of 6–1 and outscored their opponents 191–28.

== Schedule ==
Date	Time	Opponent	Site	Result	Attendance	Source
October 20	3:00 p.m.	Texas A&M	Hyde Park; Austin, TX (rivalry)	W 38–0		
October 27	4:30 p.m.	Tulane	Hyde Park; Austin, TX	W 12–0		
November 9		Austin YMCA	Hyde Park; Austin, TX	W 6–0		
November 16		Austin YMCA	Hyde Park; Austin, TX	W 24–0		
November 29		Arkansas	Hyde Park; Austin, TX (rivalry)	W 54–0	1,500	
December 8		at San Antonio Town Team	Jockey Club Grounds; San Antonio, TX	W 57–0		
December 14		Missouri	Hyde Park; Austin, TX	L 0–28	5,000	

== Personnel ==
Lettermen

Player	Position	Games started (Note: Does not include the second YMCA game due to incomplete records.)	Home town	Weight	Age	Class	Prior experience	Notes
Charles Dickson Bennett	Guard	6	Helena, Texas	170	25	Sr. (Law)	Varsity (1893)	(Note: Charles Dickson Bennett's first cousin Hugh Bennett Ruckman was a member of UT's 1901 football team years later.)
Emmet Leander Buchanan	Substitute	0	Mineola, Texas		16	Fr. (BA)		
Addison Perry Day	Fullback	4	Ballinger, Texas	150	21	Special (Latin)	Varsity (1893)	
David Strother Furman	Halfback	6	Belton, Texas	140	20	Jr. (BA)	Varsity (1893)	
Thomas Lucius Kelly	Guard	4	Haynesville, Louisiana	175	25	Jr. (Law)		
John Frost Maverick	Tackle	6	San Antonio, Texas	155	20	So. (Engi.)	Sub (1893)	
Ray McLane	End	6	Laredo, Texas	156	18	Fr. (Engi.)	Varsity (1893)	(Note: Co-founder of Texas football in 1893 along with Paul McLane and James Morrison.)
William Pinkney McLean	Quarterback	1	Mount Pleasant, Texas	140	22	Sr. (Law)	Varsity (1893)	
Jacob Eugene Michalson	Substitute	1	Dallas, Texas	130		So. (B. Lit.)		
Arthur Moore	Substitute	0	Austin, Texas	155	19	So. (B. Lit.)		(Note: Younger brother of Victor C. Moore.)
Victor Cloud Moore	Halfback	6	Austin, Texas	180	20	So. (BA)	Varsity (1893)	
John Henry "Baby" Myers	Center	6	Oakland, Texas	200	22	Sr. (Law)	Varsity (1893)	
Richard Denny Parker	Substitute	1	Calvert, Texas	160	16	Fr. (B. Lit.)		(Note: All-time lettermen lists include only Richard's older brother Daniel Parker from 1894–1897, but the 1895 Cactus lists "R. D. Parker" as a substitute.)
William Wallace Ralston	End	3	Austin, Texas	154	19	Fr. (B. Sc.)		
Thomas Edgar Sewell	Quarterback	3	Stone Point, Texas	150	18	Jr. (Law)		
Robert Roy Smith	Halfback	4	Austin, Texas	145		Fr. (B. Sc.)		

Non-letterwinners

Player	Position	Games started	Home town	Weight	Age	Class	Prior experience	Notes
James Morrison	End	2	Lexington, Virginia	175	23	Gr. (Pedagogy)	Varsity (1893)	(Note: Co-founder of Texas football in 1893 along with Paul and Ray McLane. Not recognized as a letterwinner in 1894 despite starting two games)
John A. P. O'Keefe	Halfback	1	Honey Grove, Texas	140	21	Jr. (Law)		(Note: Not recognized as a letterwinner in 1894 despite scoring the first ever touchdown against rival Texas A&M and playing at least through the first half.)

(Note: James Slaughter "Snaky" Jones is erroneously listed as a reserve for the 1894 team in Lou Maysel's Here come the Texas Longhorns 1893–1970, despite being enrolled at the Virginia Military Institute until 1895.)

Managers

- Walter Oliver Stephens, Senior (Law)
- A. L. McRae, Associate Professor of Physics

== Notes ==
Biographical
