= 1894 Richmond Spiders football team =

American college football season

1894 Richmond Spiders football
- Conference: Independent
- Record: 0–4–2
- Head coach: Dana Rucker (3rd season)
- Captain: Roger W. Harrison
- Home stadium: West-End Park

1894 Southern college football independents records
	Conf.			Overall
Team	W	L	T	W		L		T
VMI		–		6	–	0	–	0
Hampden–Sydney		–		1	–	0	–	0
Tennessee		–		2	–	0	–	2
Vanderbilt		–		7	–	1	–	0
Ole Miss		–		6	–	1	–	0
Texas		–		6	–	1	–	0
Georgia		–		5	–	1	–	0
Kentucky State College		–		5	–	1	–	0
VAMC		–		4	–	1	–	0
Virginia		–		8	–	2	–	0
Centre		–		3	–	1	–	0
Alabama		–		3	–	1	–	0
Navy		–		4	–	1	–	2
North Carolina		–		6	–	3	–	0
Arkansas		–		2	–	1	–	0
LSU		–		2	–	1	–	0
West Virginia		–		2	–	2	–	0
Texas A&M		–		1	–	1	–	0
Delaware		–		1	–	1	–	0
Georgetown		–		4	–	5	–	0
Sewanee		–		3	–	4	–	0
Auburn		–		1	–	3	–	0
Johns Hopkins		–		1	–	4	–	1
Richmond		–		0	–	4	–	2
Centenary		–		0	–	1	–	0
Trinity (NC)		–		0	–	1	–	0
William & Mary		–		0	–	1	–	0
North Carolina A&M		–		0	–	2	–	0
South Carolina		–		0	–	2	–	0
Georgia Tech		–		0	–	3	–	0
Tulane		–		0	–	4	–	0

The 1894 Richmond Colts football team was an American football team that represented Richmond College—now known as the University of Richmond—as an independent during the 1894 college football season. Led by third-year head coach Dana Rucker, Richmond compiled a record of 0–4–2. The team failed to win a game, and lost twice to Southern champion Virginia.

== Schedule ==
Date	Opponent	Site	Result	Source
October 2	at Virginia	Madison Hall Field; Charlottesville, VA	L 0–48	
October 18	Virginia	West-End Park; Richmond, VA	L 0–28	
November 3	at Norfolk YMCA	Norfolk, VA	T 4–4	
November 10	vs. North Carolina	Greensboro, NC	L 0–28	
November 17	at Georgetown	Georgetown Field; Washington, DC	L 0–34	
December 1	at Hampden–Sydney	Hampden Sydney, VA	T 0–0	
