= Frederick Shaeffer =

American football coach

Coaching career (HC unless noted)
- 1897: Fordham

Head coaching record
- Overall: 3–2–1

Frederick Shaeffer was an American college football coach. He served as the co-head football coach at Fordham University with Bob Carmody for one season in 1897. Together they compiled a record of 3–2–1.

== Head coaching record ==
Year	Team	Overall	Conference	Standing	Bowl/playoffs
Fordham (Independent) (1897)
1897	Fordham	3–2–1			
Fordham:		3–2–1			
Total:		3–2–1			
