= 1894 LSU football team =

American college football season

1894 LSU football
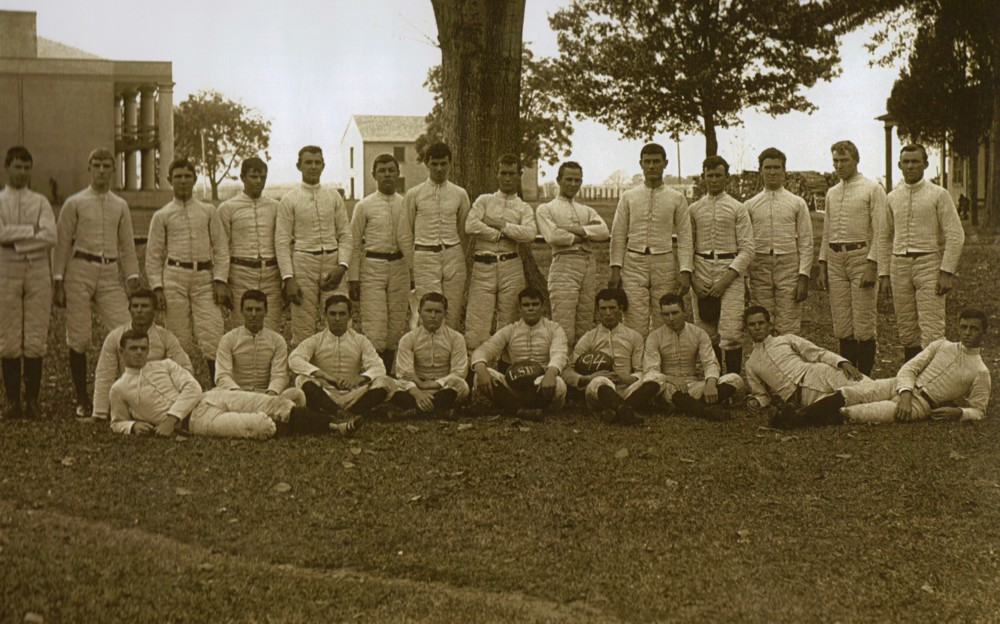
- Conference: Independent
- Record: 2–1
- Head coach: Albert Simmonds (1st season)
- Captain: Samuel Marmaduke Dinwidie Clark
- Home stadium: State Field

1894 Southern college football independents records
	Conf.			Overall
Team	W	L	T	W		L		T
VMI		–		6	–	0	–	0
Hampden–Sydney		–		1	–	0	–	0
Tennessee		–		2	–	0	–	2
Vanderbilt		–		7	–	1	–	0
Ole Miss		–		6	–	1	–	0
Texas		–		6	–	1	–	0
Georgia		–		5	–	1	–	0
Kentucky State College		–		5	–	1	–	0
VAMC		–		4	–	1	–	0
Virginia		–		8	–	2	–	0
Centre		–		3	–	1	–	0
Alabama		–		3	–	1	–	0
Navy		–		4	–	1	–	2
North Carolina		–		6	–	3	–	0
Arkansas		–		2	–	1	–	0
LSU		–		2	–	1	–	0
West Virginia		–		2	–	2	–	0
Texas A&M		–		1	–	1	–	0
Delaware		–		1	–	1	–	0
Georgetown		–		4	–	5	–	0
Sewanee		–		3	–	4	–	0
Auburn		–		1	–	3	–	0
Johns Hopkins		–		1	–	4	–	1
Richmond		–		0	–	4	–	2
Centenary		–		0	–	1	–	0
Trinity (NC)		–		0	–	1	–	0
William & Mary		–		0	–	1	–	0
North Carolina A&M		–		0	–	2	–	0
South Carolina		–		0	–	2	–	0
Georgia Tech		–		0	–	3	–	0
Tulane		–		0	–	4	–	0

The 1894 LSU football team represented Louisiana State University (LSU) during the 1894 college football season. The Tigers adopted a new coach, Albert Simmonds, for the three-game 1894 season. This season marked LSU's first ever victory with the 26–0 win over Natchez Athletic Club. The team's captain, Samuel Marmaduke Dinwidie Clark, became the first LSU player to ever score a touchdown during the game against Natchez A.C. The first football game played on the LSU campus was on December 3, 1894, against Mississippi. LSU's only touchdown in that game was scored by the head coach, Albert Simmonds. This was the first year of play for William S. Slaughter, who lettered as an end for five years, from 1894 to 1898. Slaughter was LSU's first five-time football letterman.

== Schedule ==
Date	Opponent	Site	Result	Source
November 30	at Natchez Athletic Club	Natchez, MS	W 36–0	
December 3	Ole Miss	State Field; Baton Rouge, LA (rivalry)	L 6–26	
December 21	Centenary	State Field; Baton Rouge, LA	W 32–0	

== Roster ==
No.	Player	Position	Height	Weight	Hometown	High School
-	James Hughes Arrighi	Tackle	-	-	Natchez, MS	-
-	James Beard	Center	-	-	Lake Providence, LA	-
-	Alexis "Alex" Brian	Left tackle	-	-	Montgomery, LA	-
-	Ralph A. Broussard	Halfback	-	-	Abbeville, LA	-
-	Samuel M. D. Clark	Left end	-	-	DeValls, LA	-
-	John C. Conner	-	-	-	Monroe, LA	-
-	Sam G. Dupree	Guard	-	-	Baton Rouge, LA	-
-	Harry P. Gamble	End	-	-	Natchitoches, LA	-
-	Maurice Grivot	-	-	-	New Orleans, LA	-
-	Abner A. Hodge	-	-	-	Natchez, MS	-
-	Guy N. Hunter	-	-	-	Waterproof, LA	-
-	Louis T. Hunter	-	-	-	Waterproof, LA	-
-	William J. Lewis	Quarterback, Halfback	-	-	Ruston, LA	-
-	William B. Mullins	End	-	-	Simsboro, LA	-
-	William Nelken	-	-	-	Natchitoches, LA	-
-	Robert J. Nelson	-	-	-	Monroe, LA	-
-	Edward T. J. Newell	-	-	-	St. Joseph, LA	-
-	Gordon B. Nicholson	Halfback	-	-	Baton Rouge, LA	-
-	Willis B. Prescott	Fullback	-	-	Washington, LA	-
-	Lewis A. W. Quirk	Tackle	-	-	Washington, LA	-
-	John R. Salassi	Guard	-	-	French Settlement, LA	-
-	Frederick H. Schneider	Guard	-	-	Lake Providence, LA	-
-	Edward Eugene Scott	Center	-	-	Kingston, LA	-
-	William Shewen Slaughter (III)	End	-	-	Port Hudson, LA	-
-	William C Smedes	Center	-	-	Vicksburg, MS	-
-	John E. Snyder	Quarterback	-	-	-	-
-	Duncan P. Staples	-	-	-	Alexandria, LA	-
-	George D. Waddill	-	-	-	Baton Rouge, LA	-
-	Rene J. Webster	-	-	-	Jeanerette, LA	-
-	John T. Westbrook	End	-	-	Baton Rouge, LA	-
-	Charles G. Young	Guard, tackle	-	-	Homer, LA	-

Roster from Fanbase.com and LSU: The Louisiana Tigers
