= 1894 Centre football team =

American college football season

1894 Centre football
- Conference: Independent
- Record: 3–1
- Head coach: Eugene Messler (1st season)

1894 Southern college football independents records
	Conf.			Overall
Team	W	L	T	W		L		T
VMI		–		6	–	0	–	0
Hampden–Sydney		–		1	–	0	–	0
Tennessee		–		2	–	0	–	2
Vanderbilt		–		7	–	1	–	0
Ole Miss		–		6	–	1	–	0
Texas		–		6	–	1	–	0
Georgia		–		5	–	1	–	0
Kentucky State College		–		5	–	1	–	0
VAMC		–		4	–	1	–	0
Virginia		–		8	–	2	–	0
Centre		–		3	–	1	–	0
Alabama		–		3	–	1	–	0
Navy		–		4	–	1	–	2
North Carolina		–		6	–	3	–	0
Arkansas		–		2	–	1	–	0
LSU		–		2	–	1	–	0
West Virginia		–		2	–	2	–	0
Texas A&M		–		1	–	1	–	0
Delaware		–		1	–	1	–	0
Georgetown		–		4	–	5	–	0
Sewanee		–		3	–	4	–	0
Auburn		–		1	–	3	–	0
Johns Hopkins		–		1	–	4	–	1
Richmond		–		0	–	4	–	2
Centenary		–		0	–	1	–	0
Trinity (NC)		–		0	–	1	–	0
William & Mary		–		0	–	1	–	0
North Carolina A&M		–		0	–	2	–	0
South Carolina		–		0	–	2	–	0
Georgia Tech		–		0	–	3	–	0
Tulane		–		0	–	4	–	0

The 1894 Centre football team represented Centre College as an independent the 1894 college football season. Led by Eugene Messler in his first and only season as head coach, Centre compiled a record of 3–1.

== Schedule ==
Date	Time	Opponent	Site	Result	Attendance	Source
October 20		at Vanderbilt	Dudley Field; Nashville, TN	L 0–6	1,200	
October 22		at Bethel (KY)	Russellville, KY	W 110–0		
November 3		at Louisville Athletic Club	Louisville, KY	W 24–5		
November 17	3:00 p.m.	at Kentucky State College	Lexington, KY (rivalry)	W 67–0	1,250	
All times are in Eastern time
