= 1894 Alabama Crimson White football team =

American college football season

1894 Alabama Crimson White football
- Conference: Independent
- Record: 3–1
- Head coach: Eli Abbott (2nd season)
- Captain: Samuel Slone
- Home stadium: Lakeview Park

1894 Southern college football independents records
	Conf.			Overall
Team	W	L	T	W		L		T
VMI		–		6	–	0	–	0
Hampden–Sydney		–		1	–	0	–	0
Tennessee		–		2	–	0	–	2
Vanderbilt		–		7	–	1	–	0
Ole Miss		–		6	–	1	–	0
Texas		–		6	–	1	–	0
Georgia		–		5	–	1	–	0
Kentucky State College		–		5	–	1	–	0
VAMC		–		4	–	1	–	0
Virginia		–		8	–	2	–	0
Centre		–		3	–	1	–	0
Alabama		–		3	–	1	–	0
Navy		–		4	–	1	–	2
North Carolina		–		6	–	3	–	0
Arkansas		–		2	–	1	–	0
LSU		–		2	–	1	–	0
West Virginia		–		2	–	2	–	0
Texas A&M		–		1	–	1	–	0
Delaware		–		1	–	1	–	0
Georgetown		–		4	–	5	–	0
Sewanee		–		3	–	4	–	0
Auburn		–		1	–	3	–	0
Johns Hopkins		–		1	–	4	–	1
Richmond		–		0	–	4	–	2
Centenary		–		0	–	1	–	0
Trinity (NC)		–		0	–	1	–	0
William & Mary		–		0	–	1	–	0
North Carolina A&M		–		0	–	2	–	0
South Carolina		–		0	–	2	–	0
Georgia Tech		–		0	–	3	–	0
Tulane		–		0	–	4	–	0

The 1894 Alabama Crimson White football team (Note: Alabama football teams were not referred to as the "Crimson Tide" until the 1907 season. Prior to 1907, the team was called the "Crimson White" from 1893 to 1906 and the "Cadets" in 1892.) (variously "Alabama", "UA" or "Bama") represented the University of Alabama in the 1894 college football season. The team was led by head coach Eli Abbott, in his second season, and played their home games at Lakeview Park in Birmingham, Alabama. In what was the third season of Alabama football, the team finished with a record of three wins and one loss (3–1).

After a winless season in 1893, Abbott returned as a player-coach and led the 1894 squad. Alabama opened the season with a loss against Ole Miss in what was their first game ever played outside the state of Alabama. The Crimson White then rebounded and won their final three games. After a victory over Tulane at New Orleans, Alabama returned to Birmingham where they defeated Sewanee in their only home game of the season. They then closed the year with their first all-time win over Auburn at Montgomery.

== Schedule ==
Date	Opponent	Site	Result
October 27	at Ole Miss	Fairgrounds; Jackson, MS (rivalry)	L 0–6
November 3	at Tulane	Sportsmen's Park; New Orleans, LA	W 18–6
November 15	Sewanee	Lakeview Park; Birmingham, AL	W 24–4
November 29	vs. Auburn	Riverside Park; Montgomery, AL (rivalry)	W 18–0

(Note: For the 1894 season, point values were different from those used in contemporary games. In 1894 a touchdown was worth four points, a field goal was worth five points and an extra point (PAT) was worth two points.)

== Preseason ==
For the 1894 season, Eli Abbott returned as head coach and the team sought to improve upon their winless record of 1893. In October 1894, the Birmingham Age-Herald noted the squad was considerably heavier and more conditioned for the season than in the previous year, and as such predicted Alabama would have a successful season. At that time, the initial schedule was also announced and included games against both Vanderbilt on November 5 and North Carolina on November 19, but neither game was ever played.

== Game summaries ==
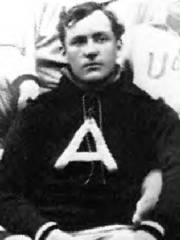
Eli Abbott was Alabama's head coach for the 1894 season.

=== Ole Miss ===
In what was the first ever game played outside the state of Alabama, in their first all-time game against long-time rival Ole Miss, Alabama lost 6–0 at Jackson, Mississippi. In a game dominated by both defenses, the only points of the game came on an Ole Miss touchdown run by William Cook in the first half. This game was notable for also being the first college football game played at Jackson.

=== Tulane ===
After a loss against Mississippi to open the season, Alabama made their first trip to Louisiana and played future conference rival Tulane for the first time and won the game at Sportsmen's Park in New Orleans 18–6. Eli Abbott scored for Alabama first and gave the Crimsons a 4–0 at the end of the first half. Tulane then took a 6–4 lead early in the second half when James Buchanan scored on a touchdown run and Edward Nelson kicked the point after attempt. Alabama responded with three more Abbott touchdown runs and a single conversion from William Walker and won the game 18–6. The first score came on a 30-yard punt return, the second on a 10-yard run and the third on a five-yard run.

=== Sewanee ===
After losing to Sewanee in their previous contest, Alabama won 24–4 in the rematch. After Sewanee took an early 4–0 lead, Alabama tied the game later in the first half when Samuel Slone scored on a 40-yard touchdown run. After Eli Abbott scored on a touchdown run early in the second half to give Alabama their first lead 8–4, Slone scored again on a 25-yard run. M. H. Bankhead and C. C. Nesmith each scored touchdowns late and Allen McCants converted both PATs for the Alabama 24–4 victory.

=== Auburn ===
At Riverside Park in Montgomery, Alabama defeated the Agricultural & Mechanical College of Alabama (now known as Auburn University) 18–0 for their first victory in the Iron Bowl. After a defensive struggle early in the game, Alabama scored their first touchdown on a J. E. Shelly run and Allen McCants kicked the PAT to give the Crimsons a 6–0 halftime lead. Eli Abbott then scored both second half touchdowns on runs of three and 75-yards and McCants converted both PATs to give Alabama the 18–0 win. Played on Thanksgiving, over 4,000 people were in attendance at the game.

== Players ==
The following players were members of the 1894 football team according to the roster published in the 1895 edition of The Corolla, the University of Alabama yearbook.

Alabama Crimson White 1894 roster
Guards: John Dewberry; Henry Pratt; A. J. Thompson; Tackles: M. F. Cahalan; S. W. McIntosh; Ends: H. M. Bankhead; Samuel Slone	Halfbacks: Eli Abbott; Allen McCants; J. E. Shelley; Quarterback: William Walker	Substitutes: Borden Burr; J. L. Davis; C. C. Nesmith; G. F. Peter; S. R. Prince; L. W. Simpson; G. E. Stone
