= Fred Sweet =

American football coach

Coaching career (HC unless noted)
- 1894: Tulane

Head coaching record
- Overall: 0–4

Fred Sweet was an American college football coach. He served as the head coach at Tulane University in 1894. Tulane recorded a 0–4 record that season.

== Head coaching record ==
Year	Team	Overall	Conference	Standing	Bowl/playoffs
Tulane Olive and Blue (Independent) (1894)
1894	Tulane	0–4			
Tulane:		0–4			
Total:		0–4			
