= Eli Abbott =

American football player and sports coach (1869–1943)

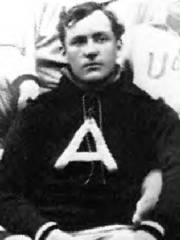

Biographical details
- Born: April 1, 1869; Chickasaw County, Mississippi, U.S.
- Died: February 13, 1943 (aged 73); Greenwood, Mississippi, U.S.

Playing career
- 1892: Alabama
- Position: Tackle

Coaching career (HC unless noted)

Football
- 1893–1895: Alabama
- 1902: Alabama

Baseball
- 1896: Alabama

Head coaching record
- Overall: 7–13 (football); 5–5 (baseball)

Eli Abbott (April 1, 1869 – February 13, 1943) was an American college football player and coach of college football and college baseball. He played football at the University of Alabama and the University of Pennsylvania and coached the Alabama Crimson Tide football team from 1893 to 1895 and again in 1902.

== Early years ==
Abbott was born in Mississippi in 1869. He was the son of James O. and Emily Abbott, both of whom were Mississippi natives. At the time of the 1880 United States census, Abbott was living with his parents and three brothers in Okolona, Mississippi.

== Athlete and coach ==
Abbott attended the University of Alabama and played at tackle on Alabama's inaugural football team in 1892. He later attended the University of Pennsylvania, receiving a Bachelor of Science degree in 1896. He played varsity football and baseball at Penn.

He served as the head football coach at the University of Alabama from 1893 to 1895 and again in 1902, compiling a career record of 7–13. He also coached the baseball team at Alabama in 1896, posting a 5–5 record.

== Family and later years ==
Abbott married Idah (or Ada) Hausman in September 1896. At the time of the 1910 United States census, Abbott was living in Leflore County, Mississippi, working as a civil engineer. He and his wife had three sons, Eli Jr., Charles and Frank. His wife and all three sons were born in Alabama. At the time of the 1930 United States census, Abbott was living in Greenwood, Mississippi with his wife, Ada, and their son, Frank. His occupation was listed as a civil engineer with a general practice. Abbott was employed as the city engineer in Greenwood for many years and remained a resident of that city for the remainder of his life. He died at Greenwood in February 1943 at age 73.

== Head coaching record ==
=== Football ===
Year	Team	Overall	Conference	Standing	Bowl/playoffs
Alabama Crimson White (Independent) (1893–1894)
1893	Alabama	0–4			
1894	Alabama	3–1			
Alabama Crimson White (Southern Intercollegiate Athletic Association) (1895)
1895	Alabama	0–4	0–2		
Alabama Crimson White (Southern Intercollegiate Athletic Association) (1902)
1902	Alabama	4–4	2–3		
Alabama:		7–13	2–5		
Total:		7–13			

== See also ==
- List of college football head coaches with non-consecutive tenure
