= 1894 Tennessee Volunteers football team =

American college football season

1894 Tennessee Volunteers football
- Conference: Independent
- Record: 2–0–2
- Head coach: W. B. Stokley (student coach)

1894 Southern college football independents records
	Conf.			Overall
Team	W	L	T	W		L		T
VMI		–		6	–	0	–	0
Hampden–Sydney		–		1	–	0	–	0
Tennessee		–		2	–	0	–	2
Vanderbilt		–		7	–	1	–	0
Ole Miss		–		6	–	1	–	0
Texas		–		6	–	1	–	0
Georgia		–		5	–	1	–	0
Kentucky State College		–		5	–	1	–	0
VAMC		–		4	–	1	–	0
Virginia		–		8	–	2	–	0
Centre		–		3	–	1	–	0
Alabama		–		3	–	1	–	0
Navy		–		4	–	1	–	2
North Carolina		–		6	–	3	–	0
Arkansas		–		2	–	1	–	0
LSU		–		2	–	1	–	0
West Virginia		–		2	–	2	–	0
Texas A&M		–		1	–	1	–	0
Delaware		–		1	–	1	–	0
Georgetown		–		4	–	5	–	0
Sewanee		–		3	–	4	–	0
Auburn		–		1	–	3	–	0
Johns Hopkins		–		1	–	4	–	1
Richmond		–		0	–	4	–	2
Centenary		–		0	–	1	–	0
Trinity (NC)		–		0	–	1	–	0
William & Mary		–		0	–	1	–	0
North Carolina A&M		–		0	–	2	–	0
South Carolina		–		0	–	2	–	0
Georgia Tech		–		0	–	3	–	0
Tulane		–		0	–	4	–	0

The 1894 Tennessee Volunteers football team unofficially represented the University of Tennessee as an independent during the 1894 season. In October 1894, the Athletic Association had resolved to drop varsity football and look forward to baseball in the spring of 1895. After the humiliating 1893 season with two wins and four imposing defeats, only two athletes willing to admit they had played on the 1893 team returned to campus in 1894. To complicate matters further, the practice field, located just west of the main entrance to the Hill, was being graded and improved.

Soon after the Athletic Association's decision, W. B. Stokely, a Tennessee senior who transferred from Wake Forest University, persuaded a group of students to form a team in the fall of 1894. Stokely, who was elected captain, gave encouragement and direction to the other players. Even though the institution chose not to be represented officially on the gridiron in 1894, Stokely and his unofficial team kept football interest alive during this period when almost certainly it otherwise would have been allowed to lapse completely.

These unofficial games, referred to as "The Lost Years", are not included in NCAA statistics or in official Tennessee win–loss records.

== Schedule ==
Date	Opponent	Site	Result	Source
November 3	Maryville (TN)	Fountain City Park; Knoxville, TN	T 0–0	
November 10	vs. Knoxville Athletic Club	Knoxville, TN	T 8–8	
November 29	vs. Knoxville YMCA	Fountain City Park; Knoxville, TN	W 12–4	
December 8	at Carson–Newman	Jefferson City, TN	W 18–0	
