= 1894 VMI Keydets football team =

American college football season

1894 VMI Keydets football
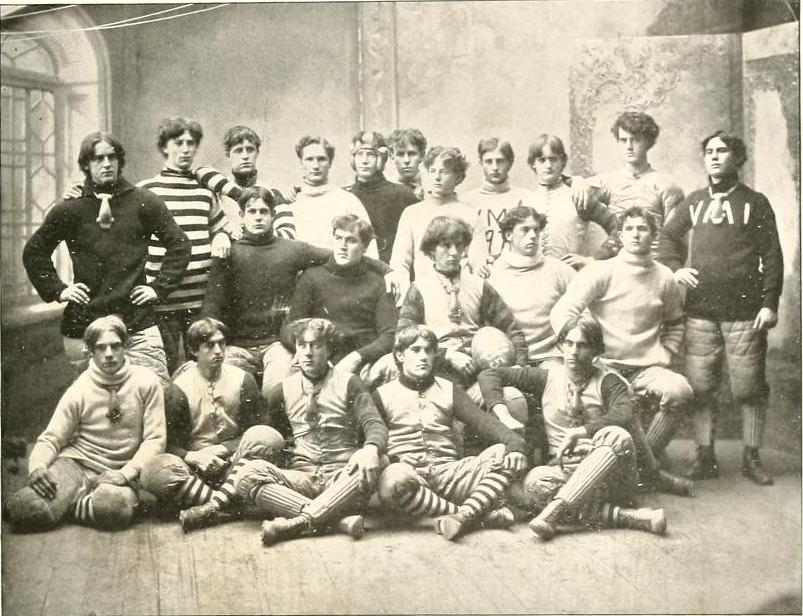
- Conference: Independent
- Record: 6–0
- Head coach: None

1894 Southern college football independents records
	Conf.			Overall
Team	W	L	T	W		L		T
VMI		–		6	–	0	–	0
Hampden–Sydney		–		1	–	0	–	0
Tennessee		–		2	–	0	–	2
Vanderbilt		–		7	–	1	–	0
Ole Miss		–		6	–	1	–	0
Texas		–		6	–	1	–	0
Georgia		–		5	–	1	–	0
Kentucky State College		–		5	–	1	–	0
VAMC		–		4	–	1	–	0
Virginia		–		8	–	2	–	0
Centre		–		3	–	1	–	0
Alabama		–		3	–	1	–	0
Navy		–		4	–	1	–	2
North Carolina		–		6	–	3	–	0
Arkansas		–		2	–	1	–	0
LSU		–		2	–	1	–	0
West Virginia		–		2	–	2	–	0
Texas A&M		–		1	–	1	–	0
Delaware		–		1	–	1	–	0
Georgetown		–		4	–	5	–	0
Sewanee		–		3	–	4	–	0
Auburn		–		1	–	3	–	0
Johns Hopkins		–		1	–	4	–	1
Richmond		–		0	–	4	–	2
Centenary		–		0	–	1	–	0
Trinity (NC)		–		0	–	1	–	0
William & Mary		–		0	–	1	–	0
North Carolina A&M		–		0	–	2	–	0
South Carolina		–		0	–	2	–	0
Georgia Tech		–		0	–	3	–	0
Tulane		–		0	–	4	–	0

The 1894 VMI Keydets football team represented the Virginia Military Institute (VMI) in their fourth season of organized football. The Keydets compiled a 6–0 record, the first undefeated season in team history.

== Schedule ==
Date	Opponent	Site	Result	Attendance	Source
October 13	St. Albans	Unknown	W 44–0		
October 16	Washington and Lee	Unknown; Lexington, VA	W 4–0		
November 3	Hampton Athletic Club	Unknown; Lexington, VA	W 48–0		
November 21	Roanoke	Unknown; Lexington, VA	W 16–0		
November 29	vs. VAMC	Unknown; Staunton, VA (rivalry)	W 10–6	1,500	
Unknown	Washington and Lee	Unknown; Lexington, VA	W 16–0		

== Roster ==
=== Ends ===
Name	Position	Class
Miles C. Selden	Right end	1895
J. S. Jones	Left end	1895

=== Guards ===
Name	Position	Class
S. T. Stratton	Right end	1898
Richard N. Poindexter	Left end	1895

=== Tackles ===
Name	Position	Class
G. Serpell	Right tackle	1895
Charles E. Michel, Jr.	Left tackle	1896

=== Centers ===
Name	Position	Class
Peyton B. Locker	Center	1896

=== Backs ===
Name	Position	Class
Sidney Foster	Quarterback	1897
Charles C. Dickinson	Left half-back	1896
Edwin A. Hickman	Right half-back	1895
John D. Twiggs	Fullback	1895

=== Substitutes ===
Name	Class
A. J. Vaughan	1895
J. B. McCaw	1895
William A. Peterson	1895
Richard B. Lawson	1897
A. B. Taylor	1895
J. M. Baird	1897
Henry A. Wise	1895
William J. Twiggs	1897
H. McMullen	1898
