= F. William Rane =

American football coach

Coaching career (HC unless noted)
- 1893–1894: West Virginia

Head coaching record
- Overall: 4–3

F. William "John" Rane was an American college football coach. He served as the second head football coach at West Virginia University in Morgantown, West Virginia and he held that position for two seasons, from 1893 until 1894. His coaching record at West Virginia was 4–3.

Rane was the head coach for West Virginia's first victory on October 7, 1893, but the team still suffered a sound loss to Washington and Jefferson College by a score of 52 to 0, a bitter repeat of the previous year's loss to Washington and Jefferson by a score of 72 to 0.

== Head coaching record ==
Year	Team	Overall	Conference	Standing	Bowl/playoffs
West Virginia Mountaineers (Independent) (1893–1894)
1893	West Virginia	2–1			
1894	West Virginia	2–2			
West Virginia:		4–3			
Total:		4–3			
