= Thomas Wadley Raoul House =

Historic house in North Carolina, United States

- U.S. National Register of Historic Places
- Location within North Carolina Location within the United States
- Location: 394 Vanderbilt Rd., Asheville, North Carolina
- Coordinates: 35°32′3″N 82°32′24″W
- Area: 3.5 acres (1.4 ha)
- Built: 1923
- Built by: Merchant Construction Co.
- Architect: Parker, Charles N.
- Architectural style: Tudor Revival, Bungalow/craftsman
- NRHP reference No.: 06001105
- Added to NRHP: November 28, 2006

Thomas Wadley Raoul House, also known as Raoulwood, is a historic home located at Asheville, Buncombe County, North Carolina. It was built in 1923, and is a two-story, hollow tile and wood frame dwelling in the Tudor Revival style. It is clad in stucco with half-timbering and has a hipped and gable slate roof. It measures 92 feet, 6 inches long and 20 to 30 feet deep. Also on the property is a contributing servant's cottage (1923) in the Bungalow style.

It was listed on the National Register of Historic Places in 2006.
