= 1894 Auburn Tigers football team =

American college football season

1894 Auburn Tigers football
- Conference: Independent
- Record: 1–3
- Head coach: Forrest M. Hall (1st season)
- Captain: J. V. Brown

1894 Southern college football independents records
	Conf.			Overall
Team	W	L	T	W		L		T
VMI		–		6	–	0	–	0
Hampden–Sydney		–		1	–	0	–	0
Tennessee		–		2	–	0	–	2
Vanderbilt		–		7	–	1	–	0
Ole Miss		–		6	–	1	–	0
Texas		–		6	–	1	–	0
Georgia		–		5	–	1	–	0
Kentucky State College		–		5	–	1	–	0
VAMC		–		4	–	1	–	0
Virginia		–		8	–	2	–	0
Centre		–		3	–	1	–	0
Alabama		–		3	–	1	–	0
Navy		–		4	–	1	–	2
North Carolina		–		6	–	3	–	0
Arkansas		–		2	–	1	–	0
LSU		–		2	–	1	–	0
West Virginia		–		2	–	2	–	0
Texas A&M		–		1	–	1	–	0
Delaware		–		1	–	1	–	0
Georgetown		–		4	–	5	–	0
Sewanee		–		3	–	4	–	0
Auburn		–		1	–	3	–	0
Johns Hopkins		–		1	–	4	–	1
Richmond		–		0	–	4	–	2
Centenary		–		0	–	1	–	0
Trinity (NC)		–		0	–	1	–	0
William & Mary		–		0	–	1	–	0
North Carolina A&M		–		0	–	2	–	0
South Carolina		–		0	–	2	–	0
Georgia Tech		–		0	–	3	–	0
Tulane		–		0	–	4	–	0

The 1894 Auburn Tigers football team represented Auburn University in the 1894 college football season. It was the Tigers' third overall season and they competed as an independent. The team was led by head coach Forrest M. Hall, in his first and only year as head coach of the Tigers. They finished with a record of one win and three losses (1–3). While the team had a losing record and outscored their opponents 106–48, the squad has the distinction of achieving the largest win in Auburn history, defeating Georgia Tech 94–0 on November 17.

== Schedule ==
Date	Opponent	Site	Result	Attendance	Source
November 3	Vanderbilt	Riverside Park; Montgomery, AL	L 4–20		
November 17	at Georgia Tech	Athletic Park; Atlanta, GA (rivalry)	W 94–0	500	
November 24	vs. Georgia	Piedmont Park; Atlanta, GA (rivalry)	L 8–10	2,000	
November 29	vs. Alabama	Riverside Park; Montgomery, AL (rivalry)	L 0–18	3,000	
