= 1894 Kentucky State College Blue and White football team =

American college football season

1894 Kentucky State College Blue and White football

State champion
- Conference: Independent
- Record: 5–1
- Head coach: W. P. Finney (1st season)
- Captain: George Carey

1894 Southern college football independents records
	Conf.			Overall
Team	W	L	T	W		L		T
VMI		–		6	–	0	–	0
Hampden–Sydney		–		1	–	0	–	0
Tennessee		–		2	–	0	–	2
Vanderbilt		–		7	–	1	–	0
Ole Miss		–		6	–	1	–	0
Texas		–		6	–	1	–	0
Georgia		–		5	–	1	–	0
Kentucky State College		–		5	–	1	–	0
VAMC		–		4	–	1	–	0
Virginia		–		8	–	2	–	0
Centre		–		3	–	1	–	0
Alabama		–		3	–	1	–	0
Navy		–		4	–	1	–	2
North Carolina		–		6	–	3	–	0
Arkansas		–		2	–	1	–	0
LSU		–		2	–	1	–	0
West Virginia		–		2	–	2	–	0
Texas A&M		–		1	–	1	–	0
Delaware		–		1	–	1	–	0
Georgetown		–		4	–	5	–	0
Sewanee		–		3	–	4	–	0
Auburn		–		1	–	3	–	0
Johns Hopkins		–		1	–	4	–	1
Richmond		–		0	–	4	–	2
Centenary		–		0	–	1	–	0
Trinity (NC)		–		0	–	1	–	0
William & Mary		–		0	–	1	–	0
North Carolina A&M		–		0	–	2	–	0
South Carolina		–		0	–	2	–	0
Georgia Tech		–		0	–	3	–	0
Tulane		–		0	–	4	–	0

The 1894 Kentucky State College Blue and White football team represented Kentucky State College—now known as the University of Kentucky—during the 1894 college football season. Led by W. P. Finney in his first and only season as head coach, the Blue and White compiled a record of 5–1.

== Schedule ==
Date	Time	Opponent	Site	Result	Attendance	Source
October 6		Georgetown (KY)	State College grounds; Lexington, KY	W 40–6		
October 13		Miami (OH)	Lexington, KY	W 28–6		
October 20		Jeffersonville AC	Lexington, KY	W 64–0		
November 10	3:30 p.m.	Kentucky University	Lexington, KY	W 44–0		
November 17	3:00 p.m.	Centre	Lexington, KY (rivalry)	L 0–67	1,250	
November 29	11:15 a.m.	Central (KY)	Lexington, KY	W 38–10	600	
All times are in Eastern time
