= W. J. Keller =

American football player and coach

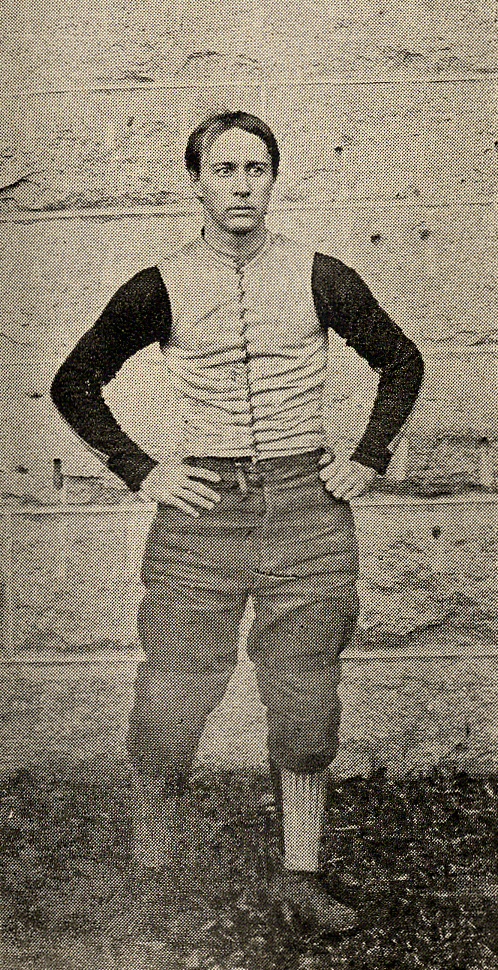

Biographical details
- Born: c. 1869; Maryland, U.S.
- Died: October 2, 1924; Spartanburg, South Carolina, U.S.

Playing career
- c. 1890–1891: Springfield YMCA
- 1893–1894: Vanderbilt
- Position: Quarterback

Coaching career (HC unless noted)
- 1893: Vanderbilt

Head coaching record
- Overall: 6–1

William J. Keller (c. 1869 – October 2, 1924) was an American college football player and coach and otolaryngologist. He was the second head football coach at Vanderbilt University, serving for one season, in 1893, compiling a record of 6–1. Keller also played and served as team captain for the Vanderbilt Commodores for both the 1893 and 1894 seasons. Before coming to Vanderbilt, he played at the International Young Men's Christian Association Training School—now known as Springfield College—in Springfield, Massachusetts for Amos Alonzo Stagg.

Keller was born in Maryland. He earned a medical degree from the Vanderbilt University School of Medicine. He first practiced medicine as a generalist in Clio, South Carolina and later specialized in otorhinolaryngology in Spartanburg, South Carolina. He died on October 2, 1924, at his home in Spartanburg.

== Head coaching record ==
Year	Team	Overall	Conference	Standing	Bowl/playoffs
Vanderbilt Commodores (Independent) (1893)
1893	Vanderbilt	6–1			
Vanderbilt:		6–1			
Total:		6–1			
