= List of Navy Midshipmen football seasons =

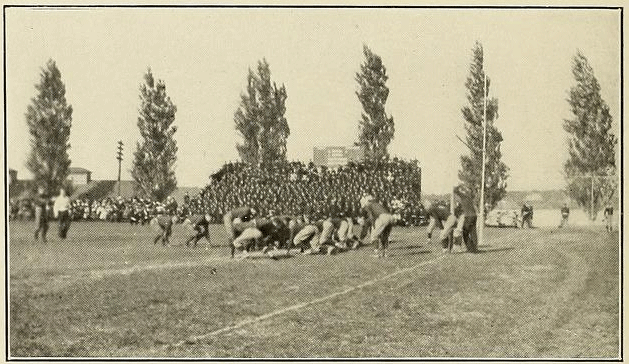
Navy's 1911 football team in a game against rival Johns Hopkins

The Navy Midshipmen college football team competes in the National Collegiate Athletic Association (NCAA) Division I Football Bowl Subdivision, representing the United States Naval Academy in the western division of the American Athletic Conference. The Midshipmen have played their home games at Navy–Marine Corps Memorial Stadium in Annapolis, Maryland since 1959.

== Seasons ==
Year	Coach	Overall	Conference	Standing	Bowl/playoffs	Coaches^{#}	AP^{°}
Independent (1879)
1879	No coach	0–0–1					
1880	No team						
1881	No team						
Vaulx Carter (Independent) (1882)
1882	Vaulx Carter	1–0					
Independent (1883–1891)
1883	No coach	0–1					
1884	No coach	1–0					
1885	No coach	1–2					
1886	No coach	3–3					
1887	No coach	3–1					
1888	No coach	1–4					
1889	No coach	4–1–1					
1890	No coach	5–1–1					
1891	No coach	5–2					
Ben Crosby (Independent) (1892)
1892	Ben Crosby	5–2					
Josh Hartwell (Independent) (1893)
1893	Josh Hartwell	5–3					
Bill Wurtenburg (Independent) (1894)
1894	Bill Wurtenburg	4–1–2					
Matt McClung (Independent) (1895)
1895	Matt McClung	5–2					
Johnny Poe (Independent) (1896)
1896	Johnny Poe	5–3					
Bill Armstrong (Independent) (1897–1899)
1897	Bill Armstrong	8–1					
1898	Bill Armstrong	7–1					
1899	Bill Armstrong	5–3					
Garrett Cochran (Independent) (1900)
1900	Garrett Cochran	6–3					
Doc Hillebrand (Independent) (1901–1902)
1901	Doc Hillebrand	6–4–1					
1902	Doc Hillebrand	2–7–1					
Burr Chamberlain (Independent) (1903)
1903	Burr Chamberlain	4–7–1					
Paul Dashiell (Independent) (1904–1906)
1904	Paul Dashiell	7–2–1					
1905	Paul Dashiell	10–1–1					
1906	Paul Dashiell	8–2–2					
Joe Reeves (Independent) (1907)
1907	Joe Reeves	9–2–1					
Frank Berrien (Independent) (1908–1910)
1908	Frank Berrien	9–2–1					
1909	Frank Berrien	4–3–1					
1910	Frank Berrien	8–0–1					
Doug Howard (Independent) (1911–1914)
1911	Doug Howard	6–0–3					
1912	Doug Howard	6–3					
1913	Doug Howard	7–1–1					
1914	Doug Howard	6–3					
Jonas Ingram (Independent) (1915–1916)
1915	Jonas Ingram	3–5–1					
1916	Jonas Ingram	6–3–1					
Gil Dobie (Independent) (1917–1919)
1917	Gil Dobie	7–1					
1918	Gil Dobie	4–1					
1919	Gil Dobie	6–1					
Bob Folwell (Independent) (1920–1924)
1920	Bob Folwell	6–2					
1921	Bob Folwell	6–1					
1922	Bob Folwell	5–2					
1923	Bob Folwell	5–1–3			T Rose		
1924	Bob Folwell	2–6					
Jack Owsley (Independent) (1925)
1925	Jack Owsley	5–2–1					
Bill Ingram (Independent) (1926–1930)
1926	Bill Ingram	9–0–1					
1927	Bill Ingram	6–3					
1928	Bill Ingram	5–3–1					
1929	Bill Ingram	6–2–2					
1930	Bill Ingram	6–5					
Rip Miller (Independent) (1931–1933)
1931	Rip Miller	5–5–1					
1932	Rip Miller	2–6–1					
1933	Rip Miller	5–4					
Tom Hamilton (Independent) (1934–1936)
1934	Tom Hamilton	8–1					
1935	Tom Hamilton	5–4					
1936	Tom Hamilton	6–3					
Hank Hardwick (Independent) (1937–1938)
1937	Hank Hardwick	4–4–1					
1938	Hank Hardwick	4–3–2					
Swede Larson (Independent) (1939–1941)
1939	Swede Larson	3–5–1					
1940	Swede Larson	6–2–1					
1941	Swede Larson	7–1–1					10
Billick Whelchel (Independent) (1942–1943)
1942	Billick Whelchel	5–4					
1943	Billick Whelchel	8–1					4
Oscar Hagberg (Independent) (1944–1945)
1944	Oscar Hagberg	6–3					4
1945	Oscar Hagberg	7–1–1					3
Tom Hamilton (Independent) (1946–1947)
1946	Tom Hamilton	1–8					
1947	Tom Hamilton	1–7–1					
George Sauer (Independent) (1948–1949)
1948	George Sauer	0–8–1					
1949	George Sauer	3–5–1					
Eddie Erdelatz (Independent) (1950–1958)
1950	Eddie Erdelatz	3–6					
1951	Eddie Erdelatz	2–6–1					
1952	Eddie Erdelatz	6–2–1				17	
1953	Eddie Erdelatz	4–3–2					
1954	Eddie Erdelatz	8–2			W Sugar	5	5
1955	Eddie Erdelatz	6–2–1				20	18
1956	Eddie Erdelatz	6–1–2				19	16
1957	Eddie Erdelatz	9–1–1			W Cotton	6	5
1958	Eddie Erdelatz	6–3					
Wayne Hardin (Independent) (1959–1964)
1959	Wayne Hardin	5–4–1					
1960	Wayne Hardin	9–2			L Orange	6	4
1961	Wayne Hardin	7–3					
1962	Wayne Hardin	5–5					
1963	Wayne Hardin	9–2			L Cotton	2	2
1964	Wayne Hardin	3–6–1					
Bill Elias (Independent) (1965–1968)
1965	Bill Elias	4–4–2					
1966	Bill Elias	4–6					
1967	Bill Elias	5–4–1					
1968	Bill Elias	2–8					
Rick Forzano (Independent) (1969–1972)
1969	Rick Forzano	1–9					
1970	Rick Forzano	2–9					
1971	Rick Forzano	3–8					
1972	Rick Forzano	4–7					
George Welsh (Independent) (1973–1981)
1973	George Welsh	4–7					
1974	George Welsh	4–7					
1975	George Welsh	7–4					
1976	George Welsh	4–7					
1977	George Welsh	5–6					
1978	George Welsh	9–3			W Holiday	17	
1979	George Welsh	7–4					
1980	George Welsh	8–4			L Garden State		
1981	George Welsh	7–4–1			L Liberty		
Gary Tranquill (Independent) (1982–1986)
1982	Gary Tranquill	6–5					
1983	Gary Tranquill	3–8					
1984	Gary Tranquill	4–6–1					
1985	Gary Tranquill	4–7					
1986	Gary Tranquill	3–8					
Elliot Uzelac (Independent) (1987–1989)
1987	Elliot Uzelac	2–9					
1988	Elliot Uzelac	3–8					
1989	Elliot Uzelac	3–8					
George Chaump (Independent) (1990–1994)
1990	George Chaump	5–6					
1991	George Chaump	1–10					
1992	George Chaump	1–10					
1993	George Chaump	4–7					
1994	George Chaump	3–8					
Charlie Weatherbie (Independent) (1995–2001)
1995	Charlie Weatherbie	5–6					
1996	Charlie Weatherbie	9–3			W Aloha		
1997	Charlie Weatherbie	7–4					
1998	Charlie Weatherbie	3–8					
1999	Charlie Weatherbie	5–7					
2000	Charlie Weatherbie	1–10					
2001	Charlie Weatherbie (Note: The team was led by head coach Charlie Weatherbie until he was replaced by Rick Lantz for the last three games of the season.)	0–10					
Paul Johnson (Independent) (2002–2007)
2002	Paul Johnson	2–10					
2003	Paul Johnson	8–5			L Houston		
2004	Paul Johnson	10–2			W Emerald	24	24
2005	Paul Johnson	8–4			W Poinsettia		
2006	Paul Johnson	9–4			L Meineke Car Care		
2007	Paul Johnson (Note: The team was led by sixth-year head coach Paul Johnson until he accepted the head coaching position at Georgia Tech prior to the team's final game of the season. Offensive line coach Ken Niumatalolo was first promoted to interim head coach and then named as the team's permanent head coach.)	8–5			L Poinsettia		
Ken Niumatalolo (Independent) (2007–2014)
2008	Ken Niumatalolo	8–5			L EagleBank		
2009	Ken Niumatalolo	10–4			W Texas		
2010	Ken Niumatalolo	9–4			L Poinsettia		
2011	Ken Niumatalolo	5–7					
2012	Ken Niumatalolo	8–5			L Kraft Fight Hunger		
2013	Ken Niumatalolo	9–4			W Armed Forces		
2014	Ken Niumatalolo	8–5			W Poinsettia		
Ken Niumatalolo (American Athletic Conference) (2015–2022)
2015	Ken Niumatalolo	11–2	7–1	T–1st (Western)	W Military	18	18
2016	Ken Niumatalolo	9–5	7–1	1st (Western)	L Armed Forces		
2017	Ken Niumatalolo	7–6	4–4	T–3rd (Western)	W Military		
2018	Ken Niumatalolo	3–10	2–6	T–5th (Western)			
2019	Ken Niumatalolo	11–2	7–1	T–1st (Western)	W Liberty	20	20
2020	Ken Niumatalolo	3–7	3–4	7th			
2021	Ken Niumatalolo	4–8	3–5	T–7th			
2022	Ken Niumatalolo	4–8	4–4	T–6th			
Brian Newberry (American Athletic Conference) (2023–present)
2023	Brian Newberry	5–7	4–4	T–5th			
2024	Brian Newberry	10–3	7–2	3rd	W Armed Forces		
2025	Brian Newberry	11–2	7–1	T–1st	W Liberty	23	23
Total:		759–605–57					
National championship Conference title Conference division title or championship game berth
^{†}Indicates Bowl Coalition, Bowl Alliance, BCS or CFP / New Years' Six bowl.; ^{#}Rankings from final Coaches Poll.
