= List of Navy Midshipmen head football coaches =

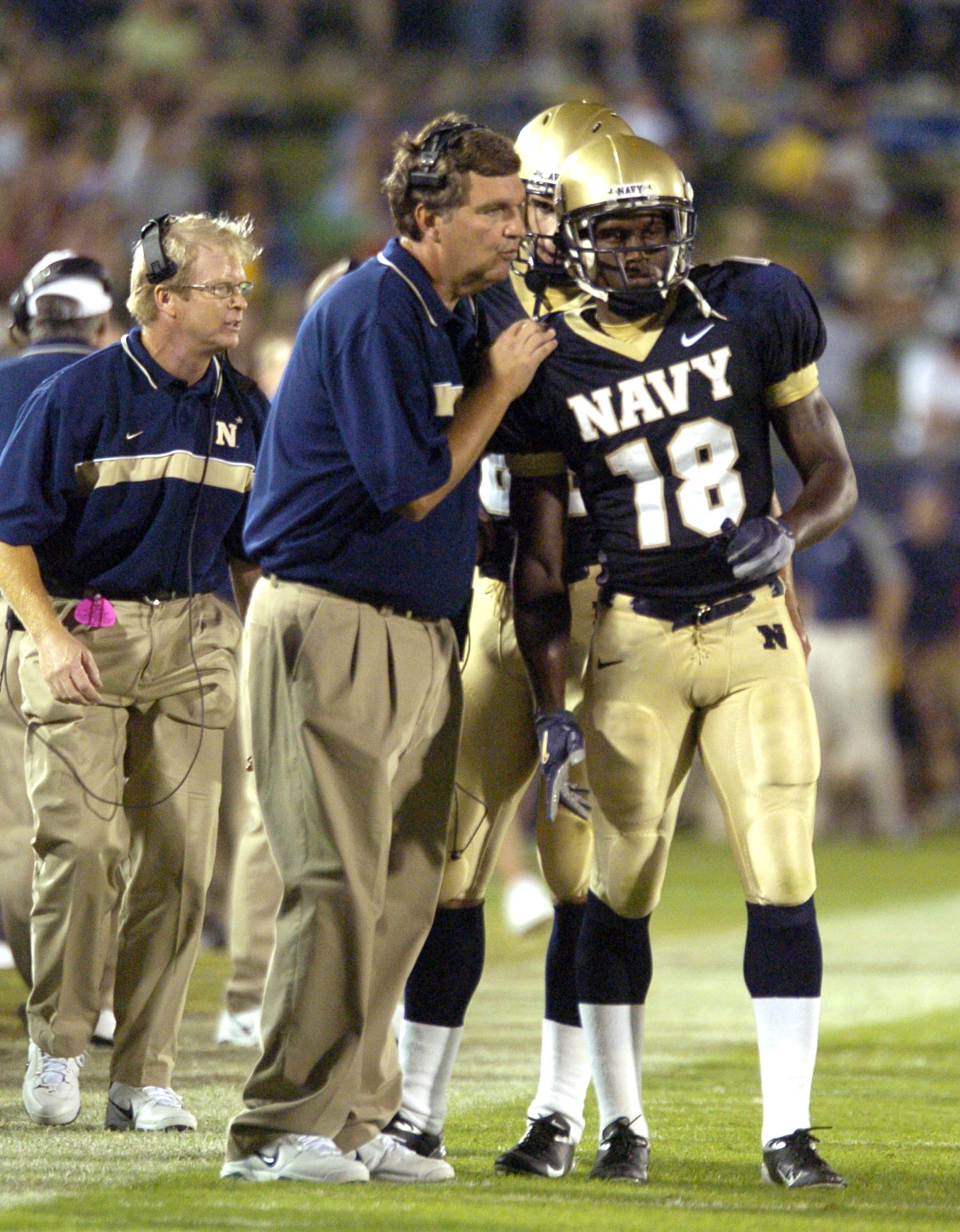
Paul Johnson coached the Midshipmen to five straight bowl games during his six seasons as head coach.

The Navy Midshipmen football team has represented the United States Naval Academy in intercollegiate college football since 1879. The team participated as an independent school for the majority of its existence, but joined the American Athletic Conference (formerly the Big East Conference) as an expansion team in 2015. The Midshipmen joined the NCAA Division I-A when it was created in 1978, becoming one of the first independent schools in that division. The program has had 37 head coaches, one interim coach, and two separate periods where it went without a coach since its formation. Ken Niumatalolo served as head coach of the Midshipmen from 2007 to the end of the 2022 season, when he was let go immediately after losing to Army to close out a 4–8 season.

The academy adopted the nickname "Midshipmen" for its students when it was founded in 1845. Between 1870 and 1902, the school tried out a number of different ideas, before Congress restored the name "Midshipmen" as the academy's nickname. The term has been accepted since. The Midshipmen have played in over 1200 games during the program's 133 seasons (through the 2015 regular season). In those seasons, seven coaches have led the Midshipmen to postseason bowl games, ten have been elected to the College Football Hall of Fame, and one, Bill Ingram, has led the school to a recognized national championship.

Vaulx Carter, the program's first coach, is the all-time leader in win percentage, with a perfect 1.000. (Note: Vaulx Carter was a player-coach who led Navy in only one game, an 8–0 shutout of Johns Hopkins.) (Note: A calculated percentage taken as a whole number on a scale of one (1.000). When computing the win–loss percentage, a tie counts as half a win and half a loss.) Of coaches who have served in more than one game, Gil Dobie has the highest win percentage with .850 after completing a record of 17–3. George Sauer has the lowest win percentage of any non-interim coach, amassing a percentage of .222 and a record of 3–13–2. Ken Niumatalolo overtook George Welsh's 55 wins in 2014, for the most games won at Navy, and his 9 seasons in 2017 for the most seasons coached at Navy. In 2014, Niumatalolo overtook Paul Johnson, his predecessor, for the most bowl games coached, with seven, (Note: Paul Johnson coached Navy for the entirety of the 2007 season, but left to coach the Georgia Tech Yellow Jackets before 2007 Poinsettia Bowl. Offensive coordinator Ken Niumatalolo, took over coaching duties for the bowl game, and served as head coach through the end of the 2022 season.) and most bowl games won (3).

== Key ==
General
No.	A running total of the number of coaches (Note: A running total of the number of head coaches, with coaches who served separate tenures being counted only once. Interim head coaches are represented with "Int" and are not counted in the running total. "N/A" indicates the team played but either without a coach or no coach is on record.)
BG	Bowl games (Note: Although the first Rose Bowl Game was played in 1902, it has been continuously played since the 1916 game, and is recognized as the oldest bowl game by the NCAA. "—" indicates any season prior to 1916 when postseason games were not played.)
NC	National championships
†	Elected to the College Football Hall of Fame

Overall games
GC	Games coached
OW	Wins
OL	Losses
OT	Ties (Note: Overtime rules in college football were introduced in 1996, making ties impossible in the period since.)
O%	Winning percentage

Postseason games
PW	Wins
PL	Losses
PT	Ties

== Coaches ==
List of head football coaches showing season(s) coached, overall records, postseason records, and national championships (Note: Statistics correct as of the end of the 2025 NCAA Division I FBS football season.)
No.	Name	Term	GC	OW	OL	OT	O%	PW	PL	PT	BG	NC
N/A	No coach	1879	1	0	0	1	.500	—	—	—	—	0
1	Vaulx Carter	1882	1	1	0	0	1.000	—	—	—	—	0
N/A	No coach	1883–1891	40	23	15	2	.600	—	—	—	—	0
2	Ben Crosby	1892	7	5	2	0	.714	—	—	—	—	0
3	John A. Hartwell	1893	8	5	3	0	.625	—	—	—	—	0
4	William Wurtenburg	1894	7	4	1	2	.714	—	—	—	—	0
5	Matthew McClung	1895	7	5	2	0	.714	—	—	—	—	0
6	Johnny Poe	1896	8	5	3	0	.625	—	—	—	—	0
7	Bill Armstrong	1897–1899	25	20	5	0	.800	—	—	—	—	0
8	Garrett Cochran^{†}	1900	9	6	3	0	.667	—	—	—	—	0
9	Doc Hillebrand^{†}	1901–1902	21	8	11	2	.429	—	—	—	—	0
10	Burr Chamberlain	1903	12	4	7	1	.375	—	—	—	—	0
11	Paul Dashiell	1904–1906	34	25	5	4	.794	—	—	—	—	0
12	Joseph M. Reeves	1907	12	9	2	1	.792	—	—	—	—	0
13	Frank Berrien	1908–1910	29	21	5	3	.776	—	—	—	—	0
14	Douglas Legate Howard	1911–1914	36	25	7	4	.750	—	—	—	—	0
15	Jonas H. Ingram^{†}	1915–1916	19	9	8	2	.526	0	0	0	0	0
16	Gil Dobie^{†}	1917–1919	20	17	3	0	.850	0	0	0	0	0
17	Bob Folwell	1920–1924	38	24	12	2	.658	0	0	1	1 – 1924 Rose Bowl	0
18	Jack Owsley	1925	8	5	2	1	.688	0	0	0	0	0
19	Bill Ingram^{†}	1926–1930	49	32	13	4	.694	0	0	0	0	1 – 1926
20	Rip Miller^{†}	1931–1933	29	12	15	2	.448	0	0	0	0	0
21	Tom Hamilton^{†}	1934–1936; 1946–1947	45	21	23	1	.478	0	0	0	0	0
22	Hank Hardwick	1937–1938	18	8	7	3	.528	0	0	0	0	0
23	Swede Larson	1939–1941	27	16	8	3	.648	0	0	0	0	0
24	Billick Whelchel	1942–1943	18	13	5	0	.722	0	0	0	0	0
25	Oscar Hagberg	1944–1945	18	13	4	1	.750	0	0	0	0	0
26	George Sauer^{†}	1948–1949	18	3	13	2	.222	0	0	0	0	0
27	Eddie Erdelatz	1950–1958	84	50	26	8	.643	2	0	0	2 – 1955 Sugar Bowl, 1958 Cotton Bowl	0
28	Wayne Hardin^{†}	1959–1964	62	38	22	2	.629	0	2	0	2 – 1961 Orange Bowl, 1964 Cotton Bowl	0
29	Bill Elias	1965–1968	40	15	22	3	.413	0	0	0	0	0
30	Rick Forzano	1969–1972	43	10	33	0	.233	0	0	0	0	0
31	George Welsh^{†}	1973–1981	102	55	46	1	.544	1	2	0	3 – 1978 Holiday Bowl, 1980 Garden State Bowl, 1981 Liberty Bowl	0
32	Gary Tranquill	1982–1986	55	20	34	1	.373	0	0	0	0	0
33	Elliot Uzelac	1987–1989	33	8	25	0	.242	0	0	0	0	0
34	George Chaump	1990–1994	55	14	41	0	.255	0	0	0	0	0
35	Charlie Weatherbie (Note: Charlie Weatherbie was fired as head coach on October 28, 2001, after losing 17 of his last 18 games. Defensive coordinator Rick Lantz was named as the interim head coach. He was fired at the end of the season, after going 0–3.)	1995–2001	75	30	45	0	.400	1	0	0	1 – 1996 Aloha Bowl	0
Int	Rick Lantz	2001	3	0	3	—	.000	0	0	—	0	0
36	Paul Johnson	2002–2007	74	45	29	—	.608	2	2	—	5 – 2003 Houston Bowl, 2004 Emerald Bowl, 2005 Poinsettia Bowl, 2006 Meineke Car Care Bowl, 2007 Poinsettia Bowl	0
37	Ken Niumatalolo	2007–2022	192	109	83	—	.568	6	5	—	11 – (Note: The eleven bowl games coached by Niumatalolo are the 2007 Poinsettia Bowl, 2008 EagleBank Bowl, 2009 Texas Bowl, 2010 Poinsettia Bowl, 2012 Fight Hunger Bowl, 2013 Armed Forces Bowl, 2014 Poinsettia Bowl, 2015 Military Bowl, 2016 Armed Forces Bowl, the 2017 Military Bowl and the 2019 Liberty Bowl.)	0
38	Brian Newberry	2023–present	38	26	12	—	.684	2	0	—	0	0
