= William Harding Carter =

United States Army Medal of Honor recipient

William Giles Harding Carter
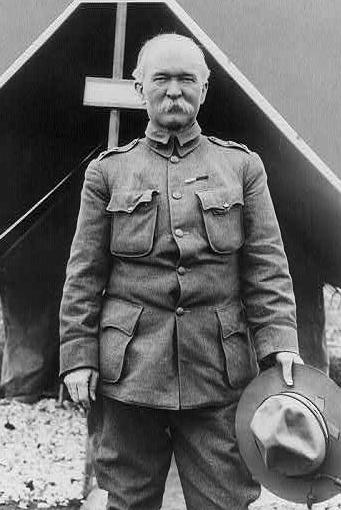
- William Harding Carter
- Born: November 19, 1851; Nashville, Tennessee, US
- Died: May 24, 1925 (aged 73); Washington, D.C., US
- Burial place: Arlington National Cemetery
- Military career
- Allegiance: United States
- Branch: United States Army
- Service years: 1873–1915, 1917–1918
- Rank: Major general
- Commands: Hawaiian Department
- Conflicts: American Civil War; Indian Wars; Spanish–American War; World War I
- Awards: Medal of Honor; Distinguished Service Medal
- Other work: Writer

William Giles Harding Carter (November 19, 1851 – May 24, 1925) was a US Cavalry officer who served during the American Civil War, Spanish–American War and World War I. He also took part in the Indian Wars seeing extensive service against the Apache and Comanche in Arizona being awarded the Medal of Honor against the Apache during the Comanche Campaign on August 30, 1881.

A strong advocate of reform in the United States Army during the late 19th and early 20th centuries, Carter and Secretary of War Elihu Root are credited with the creation of the U.S. Army War College and helped pass the General Staff Act of 1903 through the United States Congress, replacing the office of commanding general with a chief of staff and a more efficient reorganization of military staff structure. He was also an active supporter of the Militia Act of 1903 which proposed to replace the obsolete state militia system with the National Guard Bureau.

A later historian and military biographer, Carter wrote several books including From Yorktown to Santiago with the 6th Cavalry (1900), Old Army Sketches (1906) and The Life of Lieutenant General Chaffee (1917) as well as a number articles and academic papers for professional and learned journals.

== Biography ==
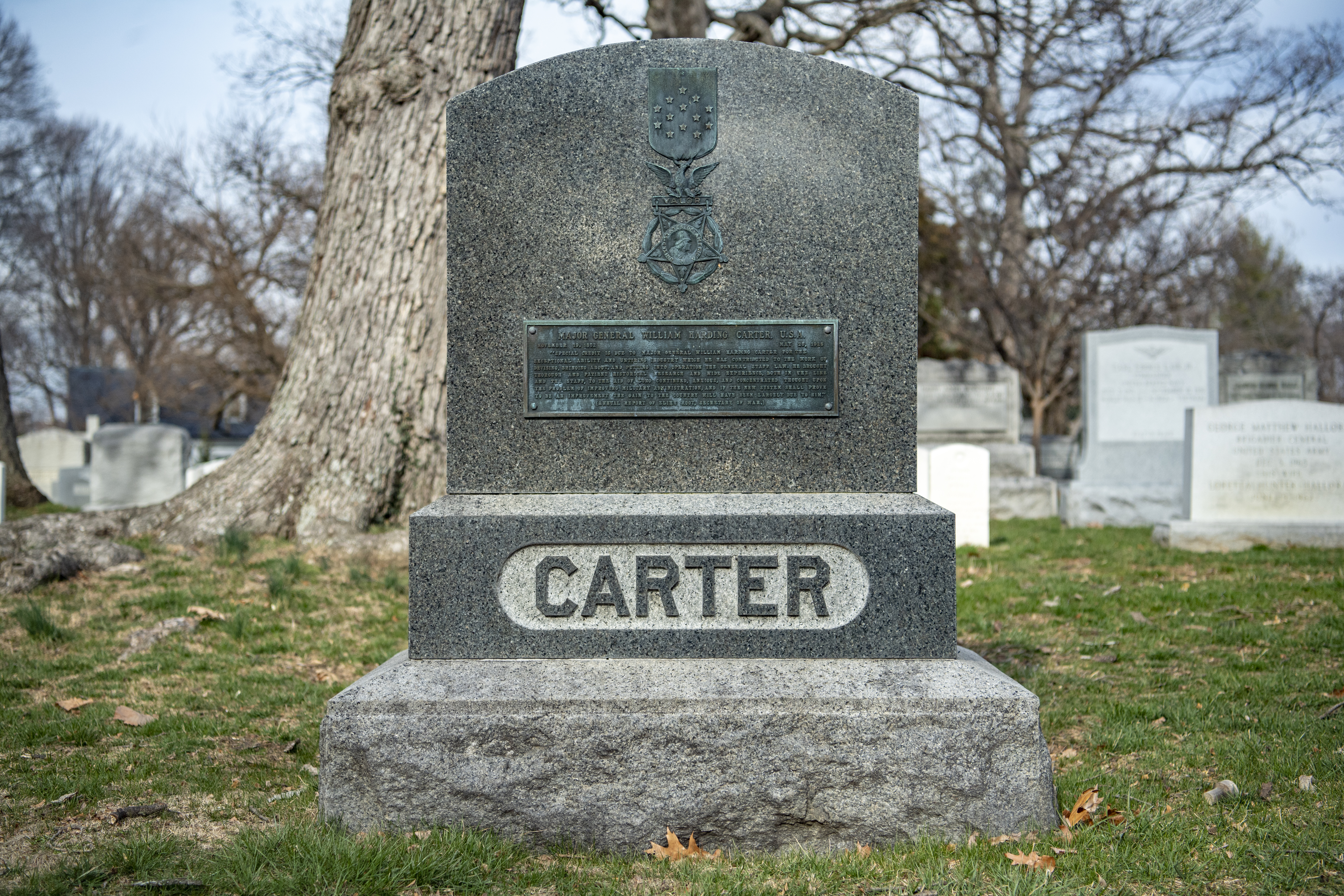
Grave at Arlington National Cemetery

Born in Nashville, Tennessee, he received both public and private schooling as a child and later attended the Kentucky Military Institute in Frankfort, Kentucky, later acting, at the age of 13, as a Union mounted messenger for the Army of the Cumberland during the American Civil War. His siblings included Laura Carter Holloway and Vaulx Carter. Accepted into West Point, Carter graduated with a commission as a second lieutenant on June 13, 1873. He was assigned to the 8th U.S. Infantry at Fort D.A. Russell, Wyoming and was later on escort duty at Fort Fetterman and Fort Laramie. In February 1874, he participated in expeditions against the Cheyenne, Brulé and Oglala Sioux.

During the summer, he followed his company passing through California to the Arizona Territory and stationed at Fort McDowell. While there, he transferred to the 6th U.S. Cavalry on November 28 and later reassigned to the 5th U.S. Cavalry at Fort Verde where he remained until May 1875. Carter served in various posts throughout the territory as an army scout and was occasionally involved in a number of minor skirmishes with local tribes. From April to July 1876, he was involved in the removal of the Chiricahua Apache from their reservation in southeastern Arizona to the San Carlos Apache Indian Reservation. He also oversaw the construction of the first telegraph line from Fort Grant to Fort Apache later that year.

After a year of scouting in the Arizona and New Mexico territories as well as the Mexican state of Sonora during early 1878, Carter won promotion to first lieutenant on April 14, 1879, and took part in the final stages of the campaign against Victorio from June to October 1880. The following summer, he took part in the Comanche Campaign as an adjutant general to Colonel Eugene Asa Carr and was awarded the Medal of Honor "for distinguished bravery in action against the Apache Indians" when he and two others rescued wounded soldiers under heavy fire during the Battle of Cibecue Creek on August 30, 1881.

During the next several years, he would rise to high position, being promoted to captain on November 20, 1889; major on January 29, 1897; lieutenant colonel on May 8, 1898; colonel on April 15, 1902; brigadier general on July 15, 1902, and finally to major general in 1909. In the years prior to the First World War, Carter was extensively involved in the technical details of organization of the US Army. He organized and commanded the Maneuver Division in early 1911, the first modern self-sustaining division composed of tactical and support components. In 1913, he commanded one of the four divisions of the "Stimson Plan", the 2nd Division (Central Department). Carter became commanding general of the Hawaiian Department before his retirement on November 19, 1915.

Following the United States entry into the war, he was recalled to duty at the age of 65 and appointed commander of the Central Department of Chicago from August 1917 to February 1918 and was later awarded the Distinguished Service Medal.

Suffering from serious respiratory problems in his later years, likely related to heart disease, he died at his home in Washington, D.C., on May 24, 1925, and was buried in Arlington National Cemetery.

His son William Vaulx Carter (1883–1973) became a brigadier general in the army during World War II.

== Decorations ==
=== Medal of Honor citation ===
The official U.S. Army citation for Carters's Medal of Honor reads:

General Orders: Date of Issue: October 17, 1891
Action Date: August 30, 1881
Name: William Harding Carter
Service: Army
Rank: First Lieutenant
Division: 6th U.S. Cavalry
Citation: The President of the United States of America, in the name of Congress, takes pleasure in presenting the Medal of Honor to First Lieutenant (Cavalry) William Harding Carter, United States Army, for extraordinary heroism on August 30, 1881, while serving with 6th U.S. Cavalry, in action at Cibicu Creek, Arizona Territory. First Lieutenant Carter rescued, with the voluntary assistance of two soldiers, the wounded from under a heavy fire.

=== Ribbon bar ===

1st Row	Medal of Honor		Army Distinguished Service Medal
2nd Row	Indian Campaign Medal	Spanish Campaign Medal	World War I Victory Medal

== Bibliography ==
- From Yorktown to Santiago With the 6th Cavalry (1900)
- Old Army Sketches (1906)
- Giles Carter of Virginia (1909)
- The American Army (1915) OCLC 328519
- Life and Services of General Chaffee (1917)
- Horses, Saddles, and Bridles (1918)

== See also ==
- List of Medal of Honor recipients for the Indian Wars
