= Owlsley =

Owlsley may refer to:

- Owlsley (mascot), a mascot of Florida Atlantic University
- Leland Owlsley, also known as Owl, Marvel Comics supervillain

== See also ==
- Owsley (disambiguation)
- Owlseye, Alberta
