= Owsley (surname) =

Owsley is a surname. Notable people with the surname include:

- Alvin M. Owsley (1888–1967), American diplomat
- Augustus Owsley Stanley (1867–1958), Kentucky politician; campaigned against alcohol prohibition in the 1920s; grandfather of Owsley/Bear; descendant of William Owsley
- Augustus Owsley Stanley III (1935–2011), better known as Owsley Stanley, American audio engineer and clandestine chemist
- Bryan Owsley (1798–1849), Kentucky politician
- Charles Henry Owsley (1846–1935), English-born American architect
- Douglas W. Owsley (born 1951), forensic anthropologist and Division Head of Physical Anthropology at the Smithsonian Institution's National Museum of Natural History
- Frank Lawrence Owsley (1890–1956), American historian
- Henry Furlow Owsley III, American investment banker
- Jack Owsley (1883–1953), American football player, coach and businessman
- Lily Owsley (born 1994), English field hockey player
- Monroe Owsley (1900–1937), American actor
- Perry L. Owsley (1915–1979), American judge
- William Owsley (1782–1862), Kentucky politician, ancestor of Augustus Owsley Stanley and his grandson, Owsley Stanley/Bear
- William Owsley (Montana politician) (1842–1919), American politician
