= Ouseley =

Ouseley or Ousley is a surname. Notable people with the surname include:

- Duncan Ouseley (born 1950), English judge
- Frederick Ouseley (1825–1889), English musician
- Gideon Ouseley (1769–1839), Anglo-Irish Methodist
- Gideon Ouseley, a pseudonym of Oliver St. John Gogarty (1878–1957)
- Gore Ouseley (1770–1844), British diplomat and linguist
- Herman Ouseley, Baron Ouseley (born 1945), British politician, author of the Ouseley Report
- William Ouseley (1769–1842), British orientalist
- William Gore Ouseley (1797–1866), British diplomat

== Ousley ==
- Curtis Ousley (1934–1971), American musician
- Harold Ousley (1929–2015), American jazz musician
- Ian Ousley (born 2002), American actor

== See also ==
- Mount Ousley, New South Wales, a suburb of Wollongong
- Owsley (disambiguation)
