= Owsley =

Owsley may refer to:

- Owsley (surname), a surname
- Owsley Stanley (1935–2011), also known as Owsley or Bear, "underground" LSD chemist and early Grateful Dead soundman, grandson of Augustus Owsley Stanley
- Owsley (musician), the stage name of Will Owsley, American singer-songwriter and guitarist
  - Owsley (album), eponymous 1999 album by the singer-songwriter
- Owsley, Missouri, an unincorporated community in Missouri, United States
- Owsley County, Kentucky, a county in Kentucky, United States

== See also ==
- Ouseley
- Owlsley, the mascot of the Florida Atlantic University: see Florida Atlantic Owls#Traditions
