= Clarksburg, New York =

Hamlet in Erie County, New York

Coordinates: 42°37′11″N 78°49′53″W

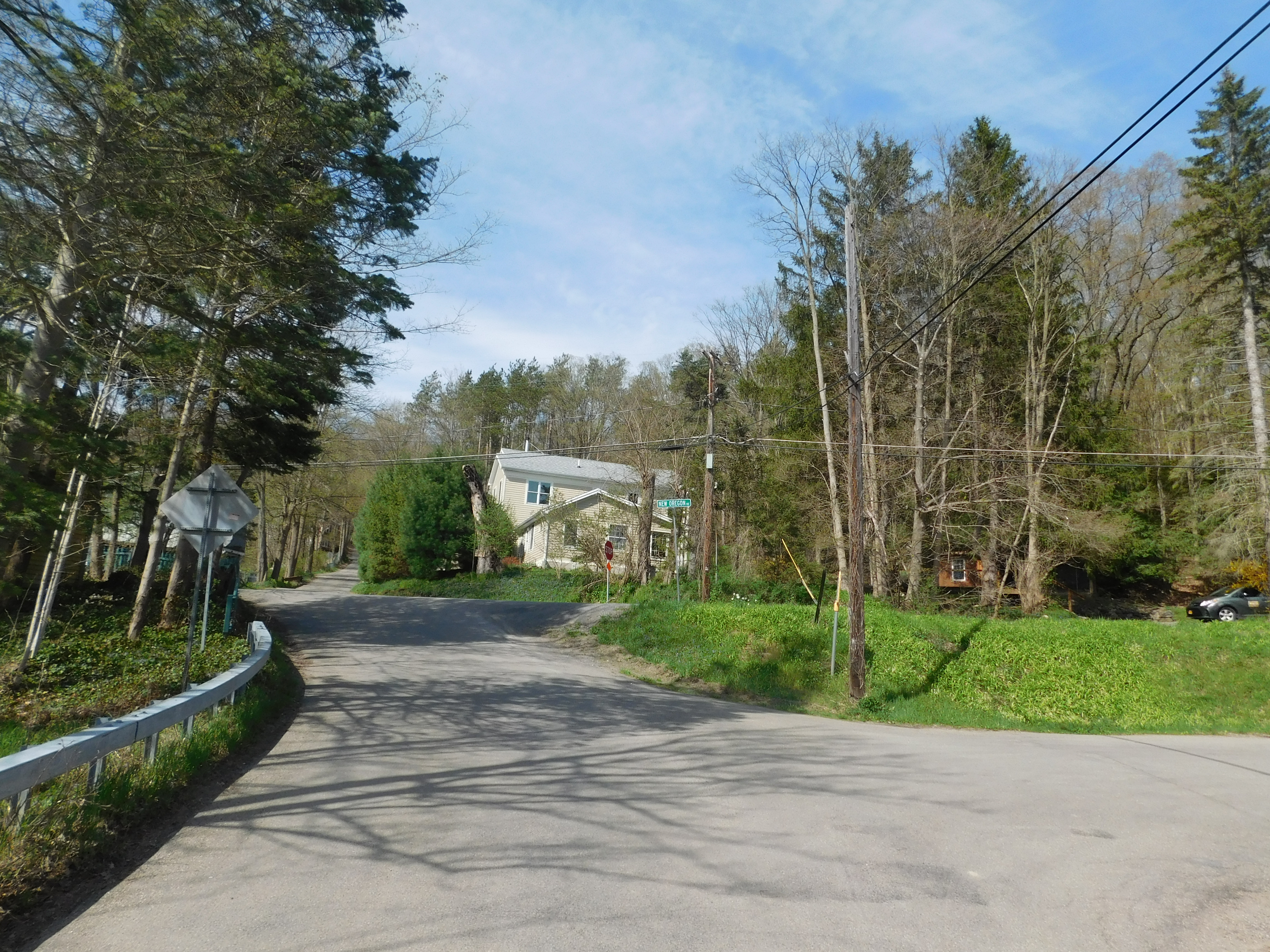
Clarksburg from the local bridge

Clarksburg is a hamlet in the town of Eden in Erie County, New York, United States.

== Notable person ==
Football player William Wurtenburg (1863–1957) was born at Clarksburg.
