= Ben Crosby =

American football player and coach (1868–1892)

- Crosby while a player at Yale, c. 1891

Biographical details
- Born: March 22, 1868; Halcott Centre, New York, U.S.
- Died: December 29, 1892 (aged 24); New York City, New York, U.S.

Playing career
- 1890–1891: Yale
- Position: Right end

Coaching career (HC unless noted)
- 1892: Navy

Head coaching record
- Overall: 5–2

Benjamin Lewis Crosby Jr. (March 22, 1868 – December 29, 1892) was an American college football player and coach. Born in Halcott Centre, New York, Crosby attended Yale University beginning in 1889; while there, he was a popular student and sportsman. He was a two-year starter on the football team and a backup on the crew team. During his junior year, he was replaced on the football team by freshman Frank Hinkey and never returned to a starting position. The remainder of Crosby's time at Yale was successful and he enrolled at the New York Law School after graduation.

Crosby was invited in 1892 to serve as head coach of the United States Naval Academy football program. He accepted the position, and, using unusually rigorous practicing strategies, led the team to a 5–2 record, culminating in an upset victory over rival Army in the Army–Navy Game. He received commendation for the victory, including a gift of a personalized trophy. Following the season's conclusion, Crosby returned to New York to continue his studies, but he was hospitalized after an illness he contracted while coaching worsened shortly after his arrival. He died from typhoid fever in late December, at the age of 24.

== Career ==
=== Early life and college ===
Crosby was born on March 22, 1868, in Halcott Centre, New York, son of David J. Crosby. As a child, Crosby attended Hopkins Grammar School in New Haven, Connecticut, the second person in his family to do so; a cousin, James Parkman Crosby, had attended the institution in the early 1870s. Ben Crosby graduated from the school in 1888, and the following year, he began classes at Yale University. Crosby was popular while at Yale, and was a member of both Delta Kappa Epsilon fraternity and the secret undergraduate society Skull and Bones. In his sophomore year, Crosby was the starting right end of the Bulldogs football team. The squad finished that season with a thirteen-and-one win–loss record; the sole loss came to the national champion Harvard. Crosby joined the university's crew team as a substitute the following year, and was described by classmates as being "quite prominent in athletics".

Early in the 1891 season, both Crosby and John A. Hartwell, the other starting end, who later followed Crosby as Navy football coach, were injured in a game. While observing a team practice, Hartwell and Crosby noticed the play of backup end Frank Hinkey. After watching Hinkey for a time, Hartwell decided to return to practicing for fear of losing his starting position; Crosby did not consider this necessary. By the next game, Hinkey had replaced Crosby as the starting end and he did not regain the position. The team finished the season with a perfect record and would be retrospectively named national champions. Crosby remained popular through his senior year at the university, and he was one of three graduates presented with a class award. Upon graduation from the school, Crosby enrolled in New York Law School and joined a law office in New York City.

=== Coaching career ===
In October 1892, shortly after he began attending New York Law School, Crosby was invited by former Yale coach Walter Camp to live in Annapolis, Maryland to serve as the coach for the United States Naval Academy football team; the program was acting in response to the appointment of Crosby's former teammate, Henry L. Williams, as coach for the Army team. Navy had first extended the offer to Camp, who suggested Crosby would fulfil the role more effectively. Crosby accepted the invitation, and became the second head coach in Navy history and the first who was independent of the program. The previous coach, Vaulx Carter, attended the academy, and had revived the program. Crosby's strategy for practices was one of the most intensive used at the academy during its early years; after classes every day, the team played two 45 minute games against a team of 22 backup players, followed immediately by a long swimming session in a cold pool. Shortly before the season began, Crosby hired former St. John's College, Johns Hopkins, and Lehigh player Paul Dashiell to serve as his assistant coach.

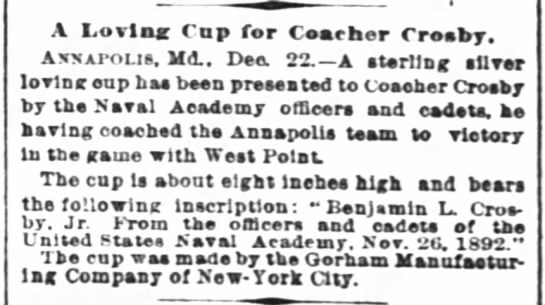
An article from The New York Times about Crosby receiving a trophy for winning the Army–Navy Game

The 1892 season commenced on October 12 with a 16–0 shutout loss against the Penn Quakers in Annapolis. The Quakers finished the season with a 15–1 record, losing only to national champion Yale. Crosby's team played their next game three days later, against the Princeton Tigers. Navy lost the game in another shutout, by the score of 28–0. These losses continued a losing streak dating back to November 21 of the previous year. The following week, on October 22, Crosby achieved his first coaching win when Navy defeated the Lafayette Leopards 22–4. This was followed by a victory the next week over the small Franklin & Marshall College; Navy won in a 24–0 shutout, their largest such win since the 1890 Army–Navy Game. They continued their winning streak into November with a 48–12 victory against Rutgers, the largest win for Navy since the beginning of the 1890 season. After a week's break, Crosby received his fourth win, a forty-point shutout of nearby Georgetown.

The final game of the season was the annual Army–Navy Game against Navy's biggest rivals, the unbeaten Army Cadets. Navy had unexpectedly lost to the Cadets in the previous year's game, and came into the 1892 game as an underdog. Despite this, Crosby expected a victory, even telling reporters he was "of the opinion that they [Navy] will certainly win". Crosby also caught the attention of the press with his scheduling of more frequent practices leading up to the game, including night practices on a lighted field. He closed all press and fan access to the practices, an unusual action at the time, because Navy officials claimed that Army had learned their plays the prior year by observing the practices. Crosby's actions proved effective as, on November 26 at West Point, Navy led Army for the entire game and won easily, 12–4. About a month after the game, in appreciation for his coaching Navy to the win, the team presented Crosby an eight-inch high sterling silver loving cup, produced by the Gorham Manufacturing Company, which was inscribed with the simple message: "Benjamin L. Crosby. Jr. – From the officers and cadets of the United States Naval Academy, Nov. 26, 1892".

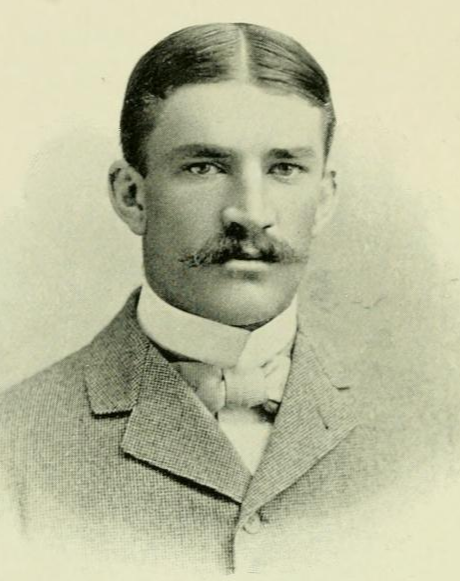
Crosby's hiring of Paul Dashiell had a lasting impact on Navy football

=== Death and legacy ===
When the season ended, Crosby returned to New York City to continue his studies at the New York Law School. He attended classes only for a brief time, because a serious illness he had contracted in Annapolis continued to worsen. On December 19, while in the classroom, he reportedly "succumbed to an attack of typhoid fever". He was taken to St. Luke's Hospital, where his condition progressively worsened over the following ten days. Crosby died on December 29, 1892, at the age of 24. Crosby's coaching position was filled by Yale teammate John A. Hartwell, who was subsequently replaced by another Yale teammate, William Wurtenburg.

In his one season as a head coach, Crosby amassed a record of 5–2 and his team outscored their opponents 146–64. The five wins are tied for the seventh-fewest of any Navy coach, but third-most of single-season coaches. Crosby also has the third-fewest losses among Navy coaches, while his .714 win percentage is tied for the tenth-highest of any Navy coach. Crosby has been largely forgotten outside of Navy football history. One event from his life that was remembered was his replacement as Yale end by Frank Hinkey, which was discussed in magazines until at least the 1920s due to Hinkey's influence on the sport. The most significant impact that Crosby had with Navy was through his hiring of Dashiell. The latter served as assistant until 1903 under the following eight Navy coaches. As head coach from 1904 to 1906, Dashiell brought Navy to national prominence and won 25 games. He later became one of the longest-serving members of the college football Rules Committee, helping to legalize the forward pass and ban the flying wedge, among other things.

== Head coaching record ==
Year	Team	Overall	Conference	Standing	Bowl/playoffs
Navy Midshipmen (Independent) (1892)
1892	Navy	5–2			
Navy:		5–2			
Total:		5–2			
