= Laura Carter Holloway =

American journalist, author, and lecturer (1843–1930)

Laura Carter Holloway Langford
- Born: Laura Carter; August 22, 1843; Nashville, Tennessee, US
- Died: July 10, 1930 (aged 86); Canaan, New York, US
- Other name: Laura Carter Holloway Langford
- Occupations: Journalist, author, lecturer
- Employer: Brooklyn Eagle
- Notable work: The Ladies of the White House (1870 nonfiction bestseller)
- Relatives: Vaulx Carter (brother)

Laura Carter Holloway Langford (August 22, 1843 – July 10, 1930) was an American journalist, author, and lecturer. She was born in Nashville, Tennessee, one of fourteen children of Samuel Jefferson and Anne Vaulx Carter. She attended school at the highly-regarded Nashville Female Academy (established in 1816), which gave her a solid foundation for her writing career.

Her father was a Unionist during the Civil War, and his Saint Cloud Hotel in Nashville was used as headquarters for Union officers. Perhaps despite this, she went through a "little rebel" phase (as Andrew Johnson once called her). However, in June 1862, she married Junius Brutus Holloway, a Union officer from Kentucky. He was "dismissed" from military service in December of that year.

The marriage fell apart quickly as Lieutenant Holloway often landed in jail for disruptive behavior, and Laura was twice forced to plead with Tennessee Military Governor Andrew Johnson to have her husband released.

Their son, George Henry Thomas Holloway, was born November 21, 1864, in Nashville.

Samuel Carter moved his family to Brooklyn, New York, after the Civil War, and Laura and George went with them. Junius Brutus Holloway wasn't with them in the 1870 census. He was registered to vote in San Francisco in 1872. It is not clear when they divorced. She died in New York in 1930

== Writing career ==
Laura worked as a reporter and editor for the Brooklyn Eagle and published several books. Perhaps due to her previous contact with now-President Johnson, she was in contact with his daughter and official hostess, Martha Johnson Patterson. Holloway was said to be a personal friend of fellow Tennessean Martha Johnson Patterson "and wrote interestingly of her."

Holloway-Langford's book The Ladies of the White House (1870), a group biography of the First Ladies of the United States became a bestseller with 150,000 copies sold worldwide, a phenomenal amount for the time. A spiritualist, suffragist, and progressive, Laura joined the Theosophical Society in the 1870s but left in the late 1880s. She had a new project that interested her.

== Seidl Society ==
In May 1889, Laura Holloway-Langford created the Seidl Society. Taking its name from the conductor Anton Seidl, the Society was established to promote musical culture among “all classes of women and children” and to produce “harmony over individual life and character.”¹ Convinced that music was a spiritual force with the power to dispel the divisions created by sex, race, or social class, Laura Holloway-Langford envisioned the Seidl Society as a public space where she could implement her ideals.

"Devoted to music and charity work, the society of over 300 women brought music to underprivileged women and children in Brooklyn through free outdoor concerts at Brighton Beach and Coney Island. These concerts were all day events including meals and time to enjoy the beaches. The society also presented lectures by prominent feminists, including Elizabeth Cady Stanton and Susan B. Anthony. The papers of the Society are housed at the Brooklyn Public Library."

In 1890, Laura married Col. Edward L. Langford, a former Union officer from Massachusetts.

Holloway was a friend of Elder Anna White of the Mount Lebanon Shaker Society. Holloway's letters to Anna White are held in the Edward Deming Andrews Shaker Memorial Collection at the Winterthur Library.
