= William Wurtenburg =

American football player and physician (1863–1957)

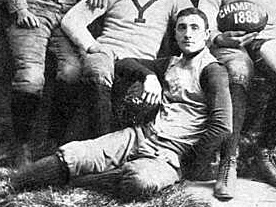
- Wurtenburg as a member of the 1888 Yale football team

Biographical details
- Born: December 24, 1863; Clarksburg, New York, U.S.
- Died: March 26, 1957 (aged 93); New Haven, Connecticut, U.S.

Playing career
- 1886–1889: Yale
- 1891: Yale
- Positions: Fullback, halfback, quarterback

Coaching career (HC unless noted)
- 1894: Navy
- 1895–1899: Dartmouth

Head coaching record
- Overall: 27–24–4

Accomplishments and honors

Championships
- 4 Triangular Football League (1895–1898)

William Charles Wurtenburg (December 24, 1863 – March 26, 1957) was an American college football player and coach. Born and raised in Western New York to German parents, Wurtenburg attended the prestigious Phillips Exeter Academy, where he played football. He enrolled in classes at Yale University in 1886 and soon earned a spot on the school's football team. He played for Yale from 1886 through 1889, and again in 1891; two of those teams were later recognized as national champions. His 35-yard run in a close game in 1887 against rival Harvard earned him some fame. Wurtenburg received his medical degree from Yale's Sheffield Scientific School in 1893.

The following year, the United States Naval Academy hired him to coach their football team. He led the squad to a 4–1–2 record for the season, including a 1–1–1 record against rival schools. He then accepted a coaching job at Dartmouth College, where for the next four years he led them to perfect records against both of their Triangular Football League opponents. They had a winning record the first year and a 5–2–1 record the second year. In 1899, his fifth season as coach, his team went 2–7 and lost both of its conference games.

After ending his coaching career, Wurtenburg spent several years acting as a referee for Yale's football team. His final contribution to football was publishing a book about Yale football in the early 20th century. Around 1904, Wurtenburg began pursuing a career as a physician. He set up a medical office near his house in New Haven, Connecticut, and became an ear, nose and throat specialist. Wurtenburg maintained his medical office until at least 1920. He died in 1957 at the age of 93, in New Haven.

== Early life and college ==
William Wurtenburg was born on December 24, 1863, in Clarksburg, a hamlet in Erie County, New York. He was the son of George M. Wurtenburg and Elizabeth Hochschild, who immigrated from Germany in 1848. William attended primary school in the Clarksville public school system. For secondary schooling he attended the Griffith Institute in Springville, New York and then Forestville Academy before gaining admittance to Phillips Exeter Academy in Exeter, New Hampshire. At Phillips Exeter, Wurtenburg competed in field events at the school's spring athletic events. In 1884, he was a well-recognized member of the school's competitive football team. He served as quarterback and team captain in 1885, leading the team to a 29–11 victory over rival Phillips Academy. In his senior year, 1886, he placed first in standing broad jump with weights and running broad jump, with jumps of about 12 and 18 feet (3.7 and 5.5 m), respectively. Upon graduation from Phillips Exeter, Wurtenburg entered Yale University.

Wurtenburg began taking medical classes on his arrival at Yale, and joined the football team partway through his freshman year. By the following season, he was playing backup halfback to freshman Harmon S. Graves, although he occasionally filled in as a fullback. The 1887 squad, later recognized as the national champion, went 9–0 and outscored their opponents 515–12; this included a 106–0 shutout of Wesleyan. During this season Wurtenburg made his most famous play: with Yale leading rival Harvard by a score of 11–8 late in the season's final contest, Wurtenburg made "a brilliant run" of 35 yards and scored a touchdown, which secured the game for Yale. He was credited as one of the people who made the game "undoubtedly the finest ever played in America", according to writer Richard Melancthon Hurd.

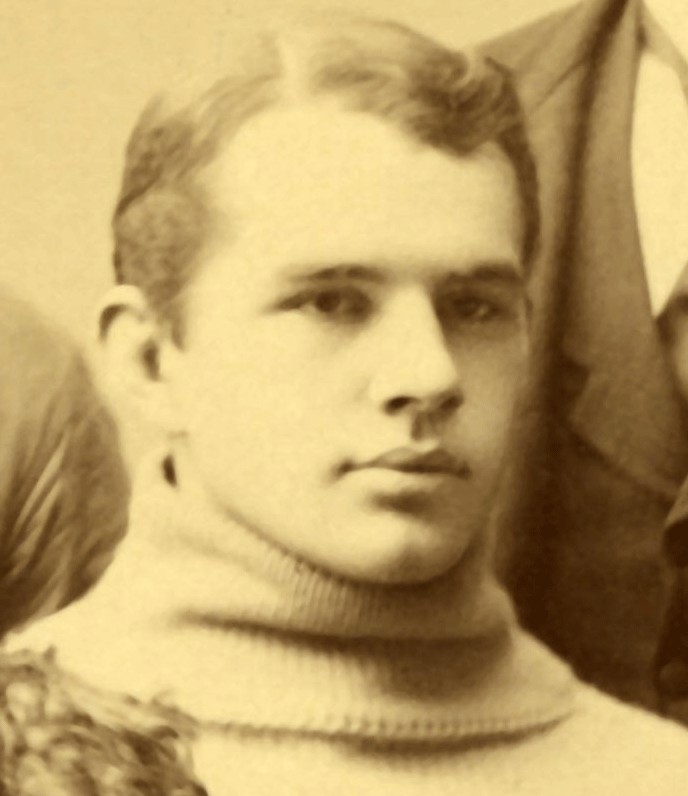
Wurtenburg was replaced by Frank Barbour (pictured) as starting quarterback for Yale after the 1889 season

The following year Wurtenburg shifted into his former position at quarterback. He took the starting spot and became a leader of the team. Wurtenburg developed his own unique style at quarterback, regularly attempting "long, low, underhand passes" to his teammates to help set up scoring plays. That year, the Yale team shut out every single one of its opponents and was later recognized as a national champion. At the same time, Wurtenburg played on the school's baseball team, where he would regularly score three or four runs a game. In September of his graduating year, 1889, Wurtenburg announced that he would be entering the Sheffield Scientific School. At the Exeter Club's first annual banquet, held that year, Wurtenburg was asked to present a toast to represent the club's athletics. In 1890, he served as the co-editor of The Yale Banner, one of the school's yearbooks. Wurtenburg played his final season of football at the university in 1891, after apparently giving up his spot on the team following the 1889 season. However, he was thrown out of the final game of the season, against Princeton, and Frank Barbour was given a guaranteed starting-quarterback slot for the rest of the time Wurtenburg was at Yale. Wurtenburg graduated in 1893, when he received his Doctorate in Medicine (M.D.).

== Career and later life ==
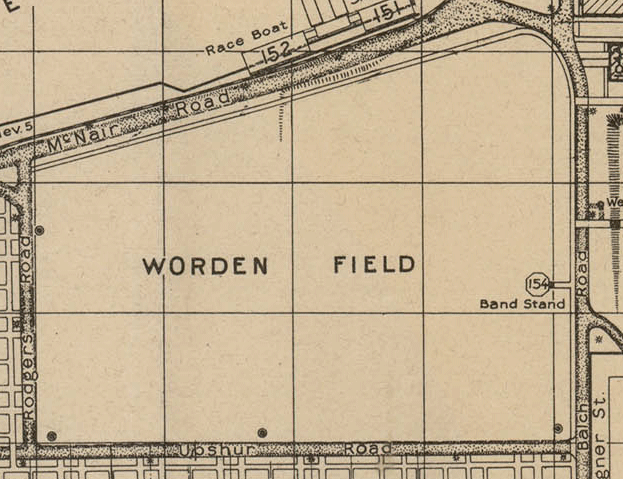
Worden Field, on the Naval Academy campus, is where Wurtenburg's Navy team played all of its games for the 1894 season.

=== 1890s ===
In 1894, Wurtenburg was hired to replace former Yale teammate John A. Hartwell as the head coach of the US Naval Academy football team. Hartwell's 1893 team had amassed a record of 5–3, including a win over rival Army and a loss to rival Penn. Wurtenburg began his coaching career on October 6, leading his team to a 6–6 tie with the Elizabeth Athletic Club of New Jersey at Worden Field on the Naval Academy campus in Annapolis. His first win as a coach came over two weeks later, on October 21, in a 12–0 shutout of rival Georgetown; it was followed by a defeat of the Carlisle Indian School. His first and only loss of the season came on October 27, at the hands of rival Penn in a 12–0 shutout. At about that time, Wurtenburg left the country and traveled to Germany to complete his medical studies. The team recovered and defeated Lehigh on November 3, then tied rival Penn State. The season ended two weeks after that match with a 30–6 defeat of Baltimore City College. The team did not compete against their major rival Army that year, after violent fights between fans the previous year; President Grover Cleveland banned the game, which would not be played again until it was reinstated in 1899 by Theodore Roosevelt. Sometime during November, Wurtenburg returned from Germany along with fellow Yale medical graduate A.S. Cheney, and announced his intention to practice medicine in New Haven. That year, he received certification, and he expressed interest in eye, throat, and ear treatment.

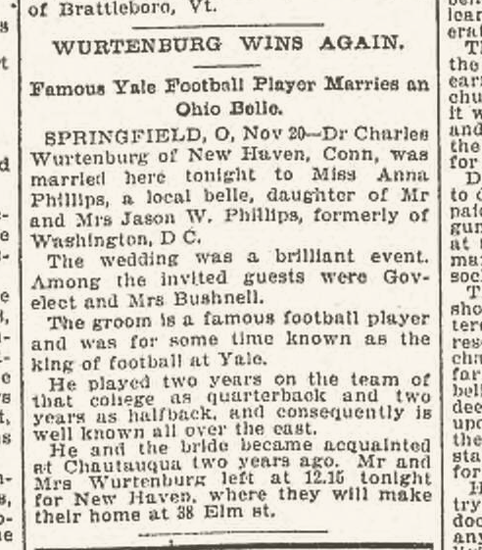
A newspaper article about the wedding of Wurtenburg and Anna Phillips

Wurtenburg did not remain at the Naval Academy the following year and was replaced as head coach by Matthew McClung. He instead accepted a position as the head coach of the Dartmouth team, starting in the fall of 1895. The season began with a 50–0 shutout of his former school, Phillips Exeter. This was followed by a loss and a tie, which were succeeded by back-to-back wins. His team dropped two games to Yale and one to Army, but managed to defeat former Triangular Football League opponent MIT. After that, Wurtenburg led his team to three straight victories, including wins over both Triangular Football League opponents. Although the season ended with a loss to Brown, Dartmouth was awarded the Triangular Football League championship. On November 20 of that year, Wurtenburg married Anna Phillips, daughter of Jason W. Phillips, whom he met while at Chautauqua in 1893. The wedding took place at Springfield, in Phillips' home state of Ohio; it was called "a brilliant event" by the Boston Daily Globe and was attended by Ohio's governor-elect Asa S. Bushnell and his wife. After the wedding, they moved to a permanent residence in New Haven.

He returned to coach Dartmouth the following year. He began by leading his team to a 30–0 shutout of the Worcester Athletic Club on October 3. His team dropped the next two games, both scoreless losses to Penn and Yale, but finished the month with a win. The second half of the season went much better, with Wurtenburg leading his squad to a 3–1 record, including a 42–0 total score against conference opponents. The team ended the season with a 5–2–1 record and a second consecutive conference championship. Wurtenburg retained his coaching position the next season, beginning the year with a blowout of Phillips Exeter, which was followed by three consecutive shutout losses. The team turned the season around in November, defeating Amherst and Williams by a combined score of 106–0 for a third consecutive championship. He ended the season with a 4–3 record and a secure position as the coach for the next year.

In 1898, Wurtenburg's Dartmouth squad went 5–6, but outscored their opponents 205–137. Beginning the season with a win over Phillips Exeter, the team went 4–1 in October. Wurtenburg's team began the month with a shutout loss to Harvard, but recovered to win four straight games, defeating their conference opponents by a combined score of 74–12. In November and December, however, his team lost all five matches, managing only 28 points. In his final year as a coach, Wurtenburg suffered the worst record of his career. After winning the first two games of the season, his team dropped the remaining seven, only able to put up 12 points. He also suffered his first conference losses, falling to opponents Williams and Wesleyan by a combined score of 23–10. Wurtenburg was replaced as coach the following year by one of his former players, Frederick E. Jennings. After the conclusion of his coaching career, Wurtenburg opened up his first medical office, operating a short distance from his New Haven home.

=== 1900s and death ===
Even after the turn of the century, Wurtenburg remained involved with the Yale football program. In 1900, he participated in the annual football team's spring scrimmage, playing on the school's "varsity" team. He was repeatedly selected by the university to act as an official in their home games; he was the school's referee in 1900 and 1901, and returned to the position two years later, in 1903. He expanded his officiating role in 1904, when he served in three games. For one of those matches, Wurtenburg moved to the position of umpire. Sometime between 1915 and 1925, Wurtenburg collected a series of newspaper articles and self-published them in a book titled Scrapbook of Newspaper Clippings about Yale Football.

At some point around 1904, Wurtenburg began to dedicate himself to a career as a physician. He received official membership in the American Medical Association and the New Haven Medical Society as a physician specializing in otorhinolaryngology, specifically in ear and nose treatment. By 1909, he had shifted his focus to the treatment of ear ailments, and occasionally served well-known locals. He retained his membership with the Connecticut State Medical Society until at least 1920, maintaining his Elm Street office the entire time.

Wurtenburg died on March 26, 1957, in New Haven, at the age of 93. A year after his death, Yale established the William G. Wurtenberg Scholarship from his bequest. (Note: Yale titled the scholarship erroneously, replacing his middle initial, C, with a G.) The scholarship "is to be awarded to a member of the senior class who demonstrates character, leadership qualities, and promise of future usefulness". Although rarely acknowledged for his influence on Dartmouth football, Wurtenburg is considered by his Dartmouth peers as having brought the program to prominence. Fred Crolius, captain of Wurtenburg's 1898 team, would later state that:

One man, whose influence more than any other one thing, succeeded in laying a foundation for Dartmouth's wonderful results, but whose name is seldom mentioned in that connection is Doctor Wurtenberg, who was brought up in the early Yale football school. He had the keenest sense of fundamental football and the greatest intensity of spirit in transmitting his hard earned knowledge. Four critical years he worked with us filling every one with his enthusiasm and those four years Dartmouth football gained such headway that nothing could stop its growth.

== Head coaching record ==
Year	Team	Overall	Conference	Standing	Bowl/playoffs
Navy Midshipmen (Independent) (1894)
1894	Navy	4–1–2			
Navy:		4–1–2			
Dartmouth (Triangular Football League) (1895–1898)
1895	Dartmouth	7–5–1	2–0	1st	
1896	Dartmouth	5–2–1	2–0	1st	
1897	Dartmouth	4–3	2–0	1st	
1898	Dartmouth	5–6	2–0	1st	
Dartmouth (Independent) (1899)
1899	Dartmouth	2–7			
Dartmouth:		23–23–2	8–0		
Total:		27–24–4			
National championship Conference title Conference division title or championship game berth
