= Worden Field =

US naval sports field

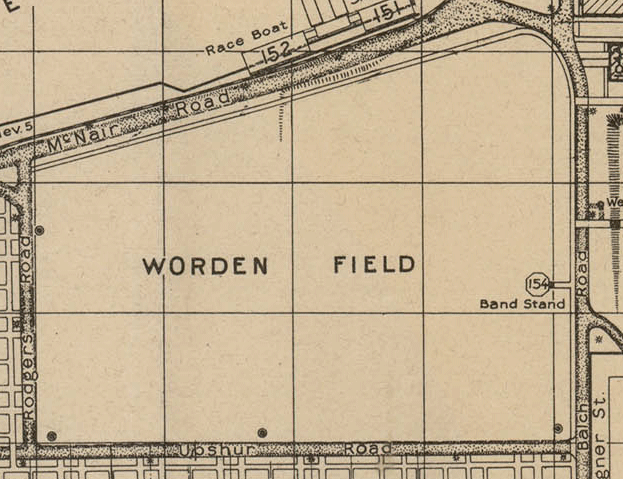
- 1924 map
- Interactive map of Worden Field
- Full name: Worden Field
- Location: United States Naval Academy; Annapolis, Maryland
- Coordinates: 38.984°N 76.49°W
- Owner: United States Naval Academy
- Operator: United States Naval Academy
- Surface: Natural grass

Construction
- Opened: c. 1890

Tenants
- Navy Midshipmen football (NCAA) (c. 1890–1923); Naval Academy parade and drill exercises (1900s–present)

Annapolis (the United States)
Annapolis (Maryland)

Worden Field is a large grass field located on the campus of the United States Naval Academy in Annapolis, Maryland. First mentioned in 1890, the field served as the home stadium for the academy's Midshipmen football team from that year through 1923, replaced by Thompson Stadium in 1924. Since the early 1900s, the field has hosted all of the academy's various yearly parades and many of its drills. It has progressively grown smaller, due to the addition of buildings and roads within the academy.

The field is bordered on all four sides by small academy roads. On two of its sides, it is surrounded by officers' quarters and is bounded by a parking lot and the Severn River on its other two borders. It has rows of bleachers located along its south side and has long contained a small gazebo on its east side. A small historical marker is located on the southwest corner; it is used regularly for drills and important parades.

== History ==
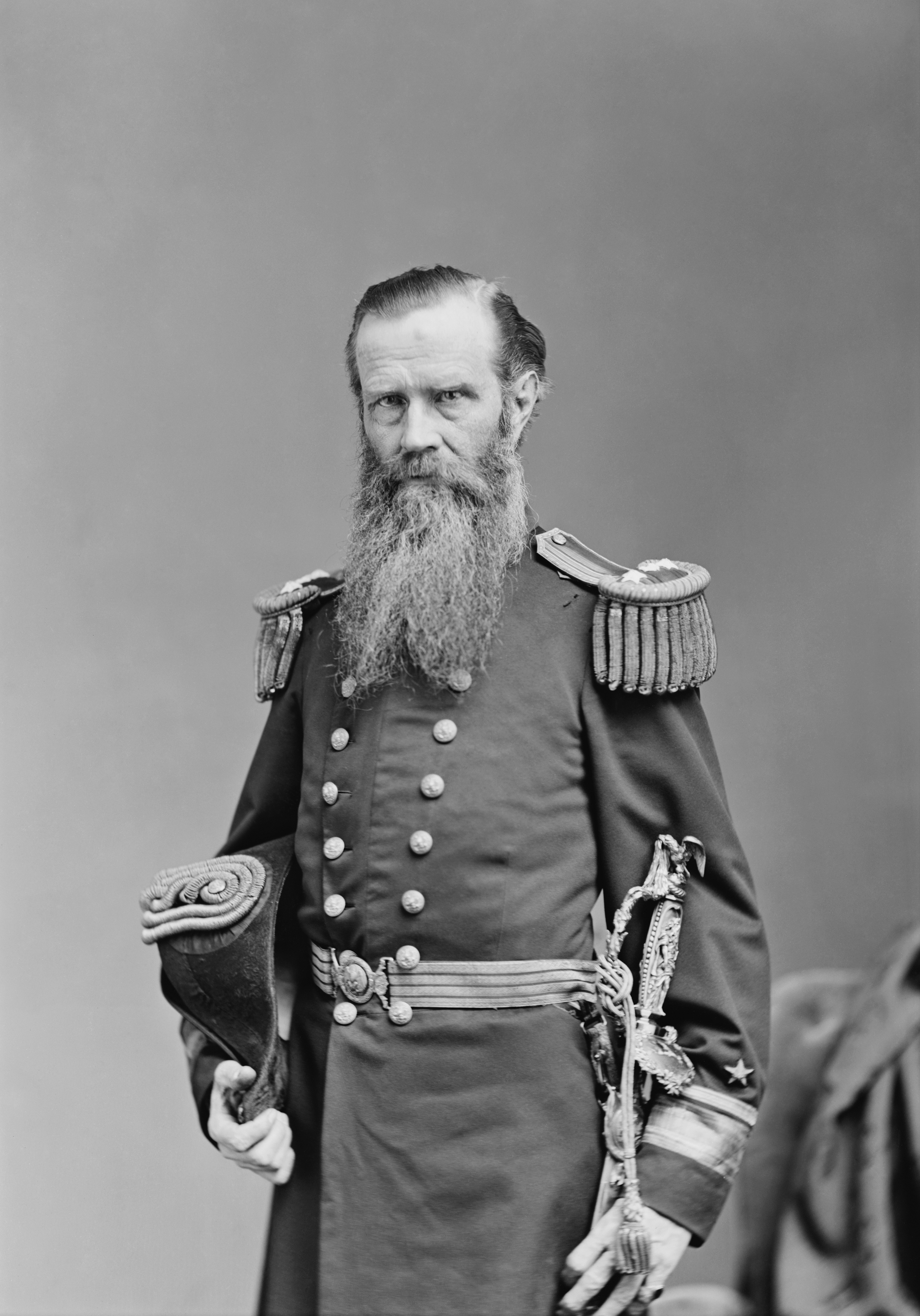
Admiral John Worden (1818–1897), a Civil War ironclad commander and later the superintendent of the academy (1869–1874)

=== Name ===
The field is named for Admiral John Lorimer Worden, who joined the navy in 1834. He was captured by the South at the start of the Civil War, but was freed in 1862. He became captain of the ironclad USS Monitor and received considerable fame after its battle with the CSS Virginia at the Battle of Hampton Roads. Worden suffered eye injuries in the battle and gave up his command; he supervised ship construction for the rest of the war. He was the superintendent of the academy for five years (1869–1874), and died in 1897, a few years after the field was named after him.

=== Usage and replacement ===
The Navy football team played its first game against the Baltimore Athletic Club in 1879 and it ended in a scoreless tie. From that year throughout the 1880s, Navy played all but one of their games at home. (Note: In 1889, Navy defeated the Washington All-Stars 24–0 at their home stadium in Washington, D.C.) Writers Taylor Baldwin Kiland and Jamie Howren stated that all of the games played at Annapolis were likely hosted on an unused parade or drill field. During that period, the team amassed a record of thirteen wins, twelve losses, and two ties, including a 6–3 lead over rival Johns Hopkins. Sometime around 1890, Worden Field began operation as the football team's home field. In that year, Navy went 4–1–1 at home, ending its season with a shutout victory of Army in the first annual Army–Navy Game, held at West Point. The following year, the team played its entire seven-game schedule at home, winning the first five games and dropping the final two, including a 32–16 loss to Army.

In 1892, coach Ben Crosby led Navy to a 4–2 record in games played on the field. The following year's team, coached by John A. Hartwell, hosted its entire season on the field, amassing a record of 5–3. The final game of that season, the fourth Army-Navy Game, made national news at the time because of the events which took place. During the game, numerous violent fistfights occurred in the field's stands, and after the contest finished, president Grover Cleveland banned further playing of the competition. It was not reinstated until 1899, at the insisting of Theodore Roosevelt, the former Assistant Secretary of the Navy and new Governor of New York. The game did not return to Annapolis, except for special reasons in 1942 during World War II.

== Location and facilities ==
Worden Field is located on the western side of the academy campus, very close to both the Severn River and College Creek. It is bordered on its west and south sides by the school's officer's quarters. A small gazebo is located near the center of the field's east side.

== Transportation ==
The field is bordered by through roads on all four sides. A small parking lot is located across a road on the field's east edge.
