= William Owsley (Montana politician) =

Mayor of Butte, Montana

William Owsley (c. 1842 – March 20, 1919) was an American pioneer and politician, who was successful in mining, real estate and related ventures in early Butte, Montana. Owsley was the fourth mayor of Butte, elected to two consecutive terms from 1882-3 and from 1883-4.

== Early life ==
William Owsley was born in about 1842 in Andrew County, Missouri, to Bryan Young Owsley and Caroline Grissam. William Owsley was descended from the Owsley Family of Kentucky; his father was named for his great uncle, Bryan Young Owsley, a former United States Representative from Kentucky and first cousin to Governor William Owsley. William's father died in 1853, when William was ten or eleven years old.

=== Life in Montana ===
William Owsley moved to Montana in 1863, intending to make his fortunate in mining. However, after working a placer claim for a year with a partner, the two parted ways with the partner taking the past year's proceeds and Owsley retaining the claim - which became Owsley's first property in what would become a successful livery and real estate career. Owsley was one of a handful of Butte pioneers who built their fortunes on commercial property rather than resource extraction. In 1869, he married Katie Van Ettin of New Jersey, who died shortly after the marriage. In 1889, he remarried Bertha "Irene" Pease of Madison County, Montana, and they would remain married until his death in 1919. He and Bertha had one son Merritt Minor Owsley born in Twin Bridges, Montana about 1892

Beginning in the late 1880s, Owsley built several large brick commercial buildings in Butte that bore his name. The largest, completed in 1891 and named the Owsley Block, was a six story brick building that was the first large business block constructed in Butte. As of 2019, two Owsley buildings remain standing on East Park Street in the Butte-Anaconda Historic District.

== Mayor of Butte, Montana ==
On May 2, 1882, William Owsley was elected as the fourth mayor of Butte, Montana. Owsley ran on a democratic ticket that was primarily focused on labor protection for white workers, and that promoted Chinese exclusion. He served two consecutive one year terms

== Later life and death ==
Owsley later made large real estate and mining investments in Mud Lake, Idaho, and in Twin Bridges, Montana. He died on March 20, 1919, at his ranch in Twin Bridges at the age of 77.
