= Swede Larson =

American football player, coach, and US Marine Corps officer (1898–1945)

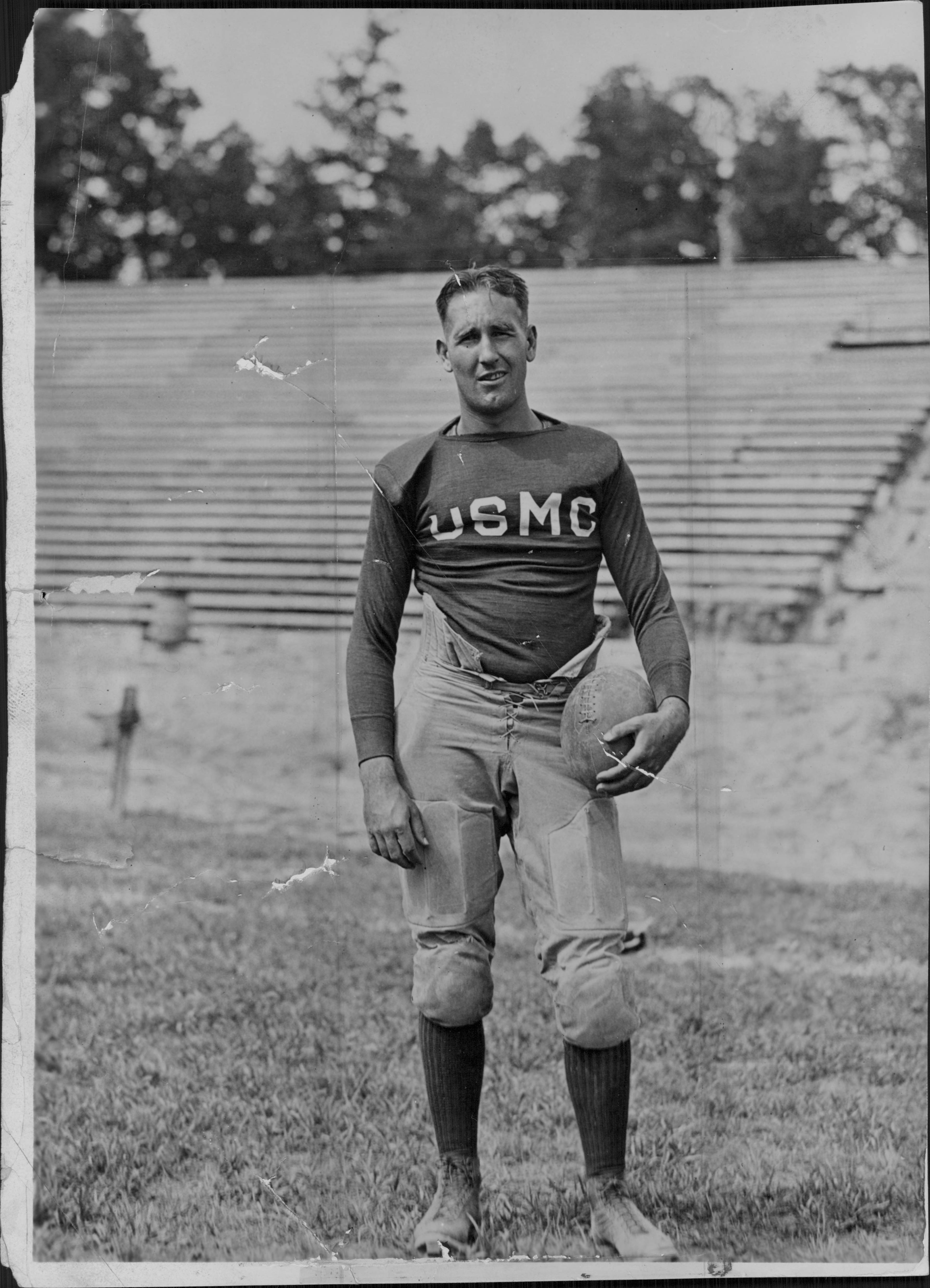

Biographical details
- Born: November 10, 1898; Cokato, Minnesota, U.S.
- Died: November 7, 1945 (aged 46); Atlanta, Georgia, U.S.

Playing career
- 1919–1921: Navy

Coaching career (HC unless noted)
- 1939–1941: Navy

Head coaching record
- Overall: 16–8–3

Emery Ellsworth "Swede" Larson (November 10, 1898 – November 7, 1945) was an American college football coach and United States Marine Corps colonel. He was the 23rd head football coach at the United States Naval Academy in Annapolis, Maryland, serving for three seasons, from 1939 to 1941, and compiling a record of 16–8–3. Larson died on November 7, 1945, in Atlanta, Georgia. He was buried in Arlington National Cemetery.

Larson Gymnasium, a 2,000 seat basketball facility that opened in December 1953 on Marine Corps Base Quantico, was named after him.

== Head coaching record ==
Year	Team	Overall	Conference	Standing	Bowl/playoffs	AP^{#}
Navy Midshipmen (Independent) (1939–1941)
1939	Navy	3–5–1				
1940	Navy	6–2–1				
1941	Navy	7–1–1				10
Navy:		16–8–3				
Total:		16–8–3				
^{#}Rankings from final AP Poll.
