= Bill Armstrong (American football coach) =

American football player and coach (1873–1938)

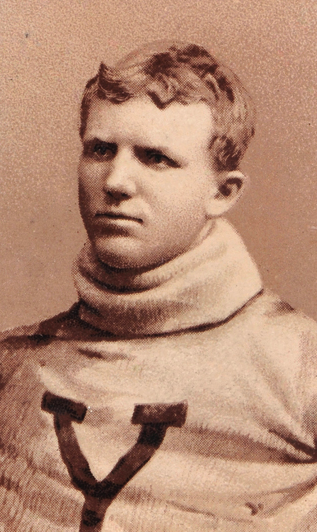

Biographical details
- Born: July 16, 1873; Saybrook, Connecticut, U.S.
- Died: August 4, 1938 (aged 65); Hampton, Virginia, U.S.

Playing career

Football
- 1892–1894: Yale

Coaching career (HC unless noted)

Football
- 1896: William & Mary
- 1897–1899: Navy
- 1912: Hampton

Rowing
- 1897–1899: Navy

Head coaching record
- Overall: 24–8 (football)

Richard "Bill" Armstrong (July 16, 1873 – August 4, 1938) was an American college football player and coach. He served as the head football coach at the College of William & Mary in 1896, the United States Naval Academy from 1897 to 1899 and the Hampton Institute—now known as Hampton University—in 1912, compiling a career college football coaching record of 24–8. At the Naval Academy, Armstrong also coached rowing from 1897 to 1899.

Armstrong was born on July 16, 1873, at his grandfather's home in Saybrook, Connecticut. His parents, William Nevins Armstrong and Frances Morgan Armstrong, were residents of Hampton, Virginia. His uncle, Samuel C. Armstrong, was an American Civil War general who founded Hampton University. Armstrong attended the Banner School in Hampton and Phillips Academy in Andover, Massachusetts, before moving on to Yale University from which he graduated from Sheffield Scientific School in 1895.

Armstrong married Rosa Fairfax Lee in Hampton, on April 21, 1906. He later worked in the oyster growing, farming and real estate professions.

In May 1938, Armstrong was treated for a serious illness at Johns Hopkins Hospital in Baltimore. He returned to his home in Hampton in June, where he died on August 4, 1938, after suffering a paralytic stroke.

== Head coaching record ==
=== Football ===
Year	Team	Overall	Conference	Standing	Bowl/playoffs
William & Mary Orange and White (Independent) (1896)
1896	William & Mary	0–2			
William & Mary:		0–2			
Navy Midshipmen (Independent) (1897–1899)
1897	Navy	8–1			
1898	Navy	7–1			
1899	Navy	5–3			
Navy:		20–5			
Hampton (Colored Intercollegiate Athletic Association) (1912)
1912	Hampton	4–1	3–1	2nd	
Hampton:		4–1	3–1		
Total:		24–8			
