= Burr Chamberlain =

American football player and coach (1877–1933)

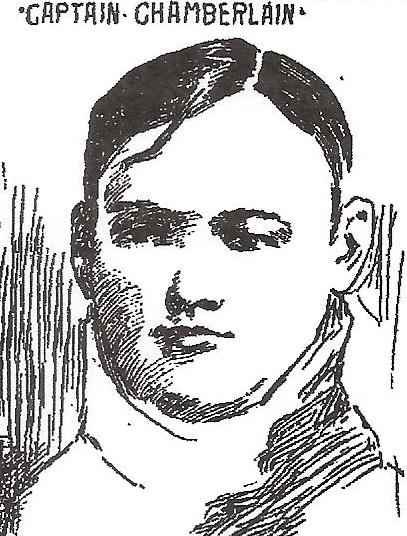
- Portrait of Chamberlain from The World of New York, September 26, 1898

Biographical details
- Born: August 21, 1877; Dalton, Massachusetts, U.S.
- Died: November 11, 1933 (aged 56); Bronxville, New York, U.S.

Playing career
- 1896–1898: Yale
- Positions: Center, tackle

Coaching career (HC unless noted)
- 1899: Stanford
- 1901: Virginia (assistant)
- 1903: Navy
- 1907: Yale (assistant)
- 1923–1925: Yale (assistant)

Head coaching record
- Overall: 6–12–3

Accomplishments and honors

Awards
- 2× consensus All-American (1897, 1898); First-team All-American (1896)

Burr Clark "B. C." Chamberlain (August 21, 1877 – November 11, 1933) was an American college football player and coach. He played college football at Yale University from 1896 to 1898 at the center and tackle positions. Three times he was an All-American. Chamberlain served as the head football for one season at Stanford University in 1899 and for a season at the United States Naval Academy in 1903 season, compiling a career head coaching record of 6–12–3. He also coached football at the United States Military Academy, the University of Virginia, and his alma mater, Yale.

Chamberlain was born on August 21, 1877, in Dalton, Massachusetts. He died of a heart attack, at his home in Bronxville, New York, on November 11, 1933.

== Head coaching record ==
Year	Team	Overall	Conference	Standing	Bowl/playoffs
Stanford (Independent) (1899)
1899	Stanford	2–5–2			
Stanford:		2–5–2			
Navy Midshipmen (Independent) (1903)
1903	Navy	4–7–1			
Navy:		4–7–1			
Total:		6–12–3			
