= Oscar Hagberg =

American football player and coach

Biographical details
- Born: December 18, 1908; Charleroi, Pennsylvania, U.S.
- Died: August 2, 1992 (aged 83); Lexington, Massachusetts, U.S.

Playing career
- 1929–1930: Navy
- Positions: End, fullback

Coaching career (HC unless noted)
- 1933–1934: Navy (ends)
- 1939: Navy (ends)
- 1944–1945: Navy

Head coaching record
- Overall: 13–4–1

Oscar Emil Hagberg (December 18, 1908 – August 2, 1992) was an American college football player and coach and United States Navy officer. He was the 25th head football coach at the United States Naval Academy in Annapolis, Maryland, and he held that position for two seasons, from 1944 until 1945. His coaching record at Navy was 13–4–1.

Hagberg was born December 18, 1908, in Charleroi, Pennsylvania. He played football as an end and fullback at Navy from 1928 to 1930. Hagberg was the ends coach for the Midshipmen in 1933, 1934, and 1939.

In his naval career he saw service in submarines and commanded two boats during World War II, USS S-16 (SS-121) and USS Albacore (SS-218). He was buried in Arlington National Cemetery.

== Head coaching record ==
Year	Team	Overall	Conference	Standing	Bowl/playoffs	AP^{#}
Navy Midshipmen (Independent) (1944–1945)
1944	Navy	6–3				4
1945	Navy	7–1–1				3
Navy:		13–4–1				
Total:		13–4–1				
^{#}Rankings from final AP Poll.
