= Edgar Miller (American football) =

American football player, coach, and administrator (1901–1991)

Biographical details
- Born: June 1, 1901; Canton, Ohio, U.S.
- Died: October 1, 1991 (aged 90); Annapolis, Maryland, U.S.

Playing career
- 1922–1924: Notre Dame
- Position: Tackle

Coaching career (HC unless noted)
- 1931–1933: Navy
- 1934–1947: Navy (line)

Administrative career (AD unless noted)
- 1948–1974: Navy (assistant AD)

Head coaching record
- Overall: 12–15–2

Accomplishments and honors

Championships
- National (1924)
- College Football Hall of Fame; Inducted in 1966 (profile)

Edgar E. "Rip" Miller (June 1, 1901 – October 1, 1991) was an American football player, coach, and college athletics administrator. Miller played college football as a tackle at the University of Notre Dame from 1922 to 1924. He was a member of the "Seven Mules" line that blocked for the famous "Four Horsemen" backfield on Knute Rockne's national championship team of 1924. Miller served as the head football coach at the United States Naval Academy from 1931 to 1933, compiling a record of 12–15–2. After stepping down as head coach, he remained at Navy as line coach until 1947 and then was the assistant athletic director there from 1948 until his retirement in 1974. Miller was elected to the College Football Hall of Fame as a player in 1966. Five of his Notre Dame teammates are also enshrined in the Hall of Fame: fellow "Mule", Adam Walsh, and each of the "Four Horsemen", Harry Stuhldreher, Don Miller, Jim Crowley, and Elmer Layden.

Miller died on October 1, 1991.

== Head coaching record ==
Year	Team	Overall	Conference	Standing	Bowl/playoffs
Navy Midshipmen (Independent) (1931–1933)
1931	Navy	5–5–1			
1932	Navy	2–6–1			
1933	Navy	5–4			
Navy:		12–15–2			
Total:		12–15–2			
