= Paul Dashiell =

American football player and coach, university professor

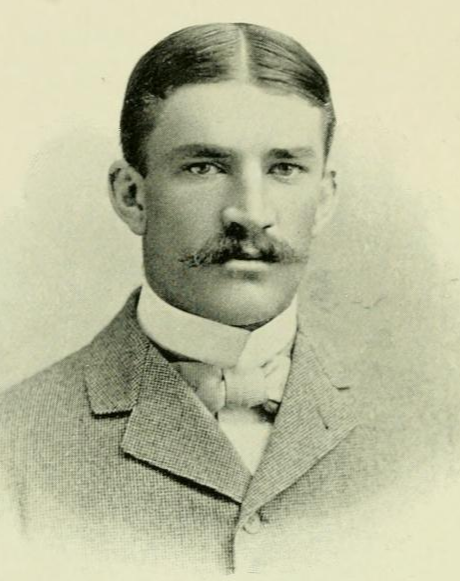
- Dashiell pictured in Epitome 1898, Lehigh yearbook

Biographical details
- Born: July 16, 1867; Maryland, U.S.
- Died: July 6, 1937 (aged 69); Annapolis, Maryland, U.S.

Playing career
- c. 1885: St. Johns
- 1886–1888: Johns Hopkins
- 1889, 1891: Lehigh
- Position: Halfback

Coaching career (HC unless noted)
- 1892–1903: Navy (assistant)
- 1904–1906: Navy

Head coaching record
- Overall: 25–5–4

Paul Joseph "Skinny" Dashiell (July 16, 1867 – July 6, 1937) was an American sportsman and educator. He was an influential figure in early American football, involved as a player, coach, referee, and administrator. Dashiell served as the second chairman of the Intercollegiate Rules Committee, the precursor to the National Collegiate Athletic Association (NCAA), from 1894 to 1911. During his leadership, the Rules Committee oversaw major reforms to the sport such as the abolition of the flying wedge and the adoption of the forward pass. While serving as the sport's top rulemaker, Dashiell continued to act as a leading referee. This created a lasting controversy which ultimately culminated in the college football crisis of 1905.

Dashiell played college football at Johns Hopkins University and at Lehigh University, and, in 1893, assisted Josh Hartwell in coaching football at Navy. Dashiell taught chemistry and mathematics at the Naval Academy. A brother, Robert B. Dashiell, was a naval officer and ordnance expert. He served as the head football coach at the United States Naval Academy from 1904 to 1906, compiling a record of 25–5–4.

Dashiell died on July 7, 1937, at the Navy Hospital in Annapolis, Maryland.

== Head coaching record ==
Year	Team	Overall	Conference	Standing	Bowl/playoffs
Navy Midshipmen (Independent) (1904–1906)
1904	Navy	7–2–1			
1905	Navy	10–1–1			
1906	Navy	8–2–2			
Navy:		25–5–4			
Total:		25–5–4			
