= Vaulx Carter =

American football player and coach (1863–1930)

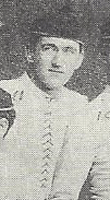
- Carter from the official 1882 Navy football team portrait

Biographical details
- Born: August 14, 1863 (Note: Sources disagree on Carter's birth date. Family records, including a genealogy compiled by his brother William Harding Carter, list the date as August 14, 1861. However, the American Genealogy Research Institute's History of the Carter Family records Carter's birth being two years later, on August 14, 1863. This date is supported by government records like those from the United States Naval Academy's Annual Register, which states that Carter was 17 years and one month old at his date of admittance, September 22, 1880, which would place his date of birth in July or August of 1863.); Davidson County, Tennessee, U.S.
- Died: Before 1930

Playing career
- 1882: Navy
- Position: Rusher

Coaching career (HC unless noted)
- 1882: Navy

Head coaching record
- Overall: 1–0

Signature
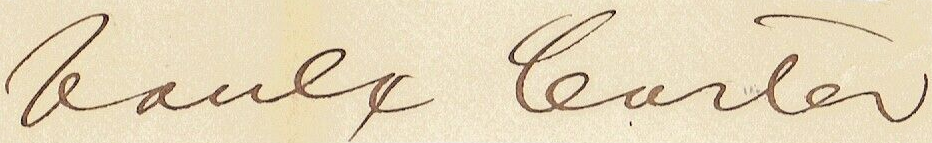

Vaulx Carter (Note: Modern sources, such as the Navy Midshipmen football program's media guide erroneously record Carter's first name as Vauix instead of Vaulx.) (August 14, 1863 – before 1930) was an American naval officer, athlete, and engineer associated with the United States Naval Academy football program. Carter was born in Tennessee, a member of the Carter family of Davidson County, and included among his siblings Medal of Honor recipient William Harding Carter and New Age religious figure Laura Carter Holloway. Raised in Brooklyn following the deaths of his parents, Carter was admitted into the Naval Academy at the age of 17. While there, he revived the school's football program and led it as player and coach, later earning the epithet "father of Navy football". An accident in 1883 left Carter permanently disabled and forced him to resign from the Naval Academy.

Information about Carter following his resignation from the academy is scarce. One Navy football historian described him as having "disappeared from the historical record". He attended some classes at Swarthmore College in 1883, but he did not complete a course. During the late 1880s, Carter was an instructor at the Hebrew Technical Institute and also worked as an engineer; he designed a parachute and a model of a plan for the Nicaragua Canal, both of which attracted media attention. During the 1890s, he was an assignee for several corporations in New York City. Carter later served as a lieutenant in the New York Naval Militia and worked for the New York City government. During the 1920s, he lived with his sister Laura on a farm in upstate New York, managing her accounts and occasionally contributing articles to a magazine she edited. According to census records, Carter died sometime before 1930.

== Biography and career ==
=== Early life and Naval Academy ===
Vaulx Carter was born on August 14, 1863, in Davidson County, Tennessee, the sixteenth of seventeen children to Samuel Jefferson Carter, a Southern Unionist and prominent Nashville hotelier. His mother was Anne Vaulx, the elder Carter's second wife. Among Vaulx's siblings were William Harding Carter, a major general in the United States Army and Medal of Honor recipient, and Laura Carter Holloway, a writer, newspaper editor, and Theosophist figure. He was raised there for the early part of his life, but was orphaned along with two of his siblings following his father's death in March 1873 and his mother's the next year. The siblings remained without a guardian until February 1875, when they were adopted by a family member and spent the rest of their childhood in Pennsylvania. Carter attended the Swarthmore Preparatory School during the 1877–78 and 1878–79 academic years as a science student. He then spent one year at Swarthmore College, again with a science focus. Following his freshman year at Swarthmore, in September 1880, Carter passed the entrance examinations for the United States Naval Academy. On the twenty-second of that month, he was admitted into the academy, one of four people selected to represent Pennsylvania at the academy in that year's class. In his second year at the school, Carter excelled in English and drawing, but had poor discipline and received 109 demerits; using a point evaluation system, the Naval Academy gave Carter fifty-three out of a possible seventy-six points for his conduct during the year. Between his second and third years, Cater sailed on the U.S.S. Constitution as a part of the academy's summer cruise. His conduct worsened that year, and he only excelled in drawing. At the end of the year, Carter received ninety-nine of a possible one-hundred fifty-two points. Carter was scheduled to graduate from the Naval Academy in 1884, but was forced to resign in 1883. While performing his duties as a naval cadet, Carter became caught in a gale and fell. He received permanent injuries from the accident, which caused his resignation on June 14, 1883.

==== 1882 football season ====
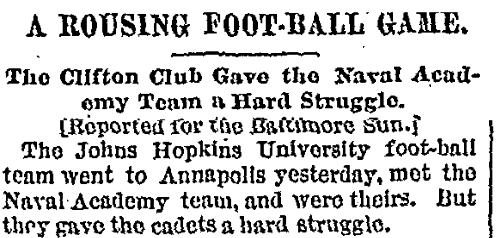
The headline from The Sun's article about the game against the Clifton Athletic Club

In 1879, football began as a sport at the academy. Student William John Maxwell organized a team made up of fellow students, without any support of faculty. He organized a game with the Baltimore Athletic Club, which ended in a scoreless tie. Maxwell graduated in 1880, and the football program ended in his absence. In 1882, Carter re-initiated and organized a new football team. He took a position as the team coach, the first in school history; he also functioned as a back when playing. He scheduled a single game for the season, which was played on Thanksgiving Day against the Baltimore-based Clifton Football Club. The Clifton team was made up of players from Johns Hopkins University, who were unable to play for their school due to the administrator's negative views towards the sport. Carter designed a maroon and white uniform for the squad and a strip of leather which was nailed to the bottom of their shoes to prevent slipping.

It snowed heavily before the game, to the point where players for both teams had to clear layers of snow off of the field, making large piles of snow along the sides of the playing ground. The first half of the game was scoreless; the Baltimore American reported that "the visitors pushed Navy every place but over the goal line in the first half". During play, the ball was kicked over the seawall a number of times, once going so far out it had to be retrieved by boat before play could continue. The American described the second half in detail:

After ten minutes interval the ball was again put in play, this time being kicked off by the Cliftons. The rest period had apparently stiffened the Cliftons, for the Academy making a vigorous spurt got the ball thru them, and Street, following it up well, scored a touchdown for the Academy.

The try at goal failed, but the ball, instead of going to the Cliftons behind the line, fell into the field and into the hands of one of the Academy team. By a quick decisive run, he again got the ball over the Cliftons goal line and scored a touchdown.

The Naval Academy won the contest 8–0, which made it the academy's first ever football victory, and was the first match in which they recorded points. It would remain the school's only victory until the 1884 season, and would remain as the last shutout for the school until 1886, when a squad defeated Johns Hopkins 6–0. Carter's single win gives him the second fewest in Navy football history, behind interim coach Rick Lantz. However, his undefeated record and perfect win percentage remain the highest ever for the academy.

=== After the Naval Academy ===
Little is known of Carter after he left the Naval Academy. Sportswriter Jack Clary, in his history of the Navy Midshipmen football program, describes Carter as having "disappeared from the historical record", his establishment of the football team being Carter's "only claim to fame". Sometime between 1890 and 1893, Carter was hired as the treasurer and assignee for the Cowles Engineering Company. The organization was created in 1890 under official laws of the state of New Jersey, under the leadership of William Cowles. It served branches of the U.S. Government and the city of New York. The company went into bankruptcy and failed three years later, owing its creditors over $30,000 (equivalent to $1,075,000 respectively in 2025). The year of Carter's death is unknown.

== Head coaching record ==
Year	Team	Overall	Conference	Standing	Bowl/playoffsteam
Navy Midshipmen (Independent) (1882)
1882	Navy	1–0			
Navy:		1–0			
Total:		1–0			
