= Jack Owsley =

American football player, coach, and businessman (1883–1953)

- Jack Owsley, Yale football coach, 1905

Biographical details
- Born: March 17, 1883; Chicago, Illinois, U.S.
- Died: July 14, 1953 (aged 70); Orford, New Hampshire, U.S.

Playing career
- 1901: Yale
- 1903–1904: Yale
- Positions: Halfback, fullback, quarterback

Coaching career (HC unless noted)
- 1905: Yale
- 1923–1924: Yale (backfield)
- 1925: Navy

Head coaching record
- Overall: 15–2–1

Accomplishments and honors

Championships
- 1 national (1905)

John Ebsworth Owsley (March 17, 1883 – July 14, 1953) was an American football player and coach and businessman. He played college football, principally as a left halfback, for Yale University from 1901 to 1904. He was the head coach of Yale's undefeated 1905 football team that outscored opponents 226 to 4. He also served as the head football coach at the United States Naval Academy in 1925. He gained a reputation as a wartime producer of armaments, working with Marlin-Rockwell Corporation during World War I and with the High Standard Manufacturing Company during World War II. He was one of the highest paid persons in the United States in 1941 and 1942.

== Early years ==
Owsley was born in Chicago, Illinois, in 1883. His father was Heaton Owsley (1856–1930), an Illinois native and manufacturer. His mother, Harriet (Byrne) Owsley was a Mississippi native who died in the same year that Owsley was born. His father remarried to Lina Harrison (a daughter of Carter Harrison III, who served as mayor of Chicago from 1879 to 1887 and in 1893 until being assassinated). This made Owsley the step-nephew of Carter Harrison IV (a son of Harrison III who also served as mayor of Chicago from 1897 to 1905 and 1915–1911).

Owsley attended preparatory school at the Phillips Academy in Andover, New Hampshire, graduating in 1902.

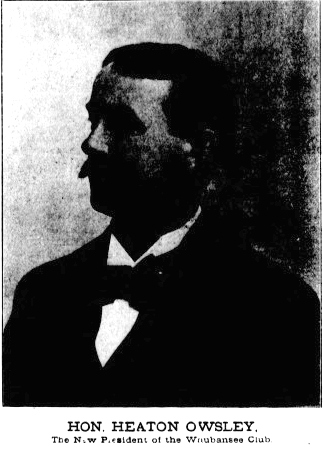
Heaton Owsley, Jack's Father

== Yale ==
Owsley enrolled at the Sheffield Scientific School at Yale University in 1901 at age 18. He played for the Yale Bulldogs football team in 1901, 1903, and 1904. He played most of the 1901 season with Yale's freshman football team but was brought into the 1901 Harvard–Yale game a substitute. During the 1902 season, Owsley was ineligible due to "scholarship deficiencies." During the 1903 and 1904 seasons, Owsley was a starter, mostly at the left halfback position, but occasionally appearing at right halfback, fullback and quarterback. After the 1904 season, Owsley was selected as a second-team All-American at the halfback position by The New York Sun.

== Football coach ==
=== Yale ===
Owsley returned to Yale in the fall of 1905 as the head coach of the school's varsity football team. Owsley led the team to a perfect 10–0 record, as his team outscored opponents by a combined score of 226 to 4. The 1905 team coached by Owsley has been recognized as that year's national championship team by Parke-Davis and Caspar Whitney.

In 1905, Owsley was one of the advisers with whom President Theodore Roosevelt consulted concerning his campaign to reduce the level of violence and reform the game of football. The New York Times described an October 1905 meeting between Roosevelt and "the men who rule the game," a group consisting of Owsley, Walter Camp, and five other persons.

During the period from 1899 to 1912, Yale had 14 different head football coaches in 14 years – despite compiling a combined record of 127–11–10 in those years. During that 14-year span, the Yale football team has also been recognized as the national championship team by one or more of the major national championship selectors on seven occasions – 1900 (Billingsley, Helms, Houlgate, National Championship Foundation, Parke-Davis), 1901 (Parke-Davis), 1902 (Parke-Davis), 1905 (Parke-Davis, Whitney), 1906 (Billingsley, Parke-Davis, Whitney), 1907 (Billingsley, Helms, Houlgate, National Championship Foundation, Parke-Davis, Whitney), and 1909 (Billingsley, Helms, Houlgate, National Championship Foundation, Parke-Davis).

Owsley also served as an assistant coach and coach of the "scrub" team at Yale for several years thereafter. He returned to Yale as backfield coach under head coach Tad Jones during the 1923 and 1924 football seasons.

=== Navy ===
In December 1924, Owsley traveled to Annapolis, Maryland, and was interviewed to become the head football coach at United States Naval Academy. He was hired by Navy in January 1925, and became the 18th head coach for the Navy Midshipmen football team. His coaching record at Navy was 5–2–1.

== Business career and family ==
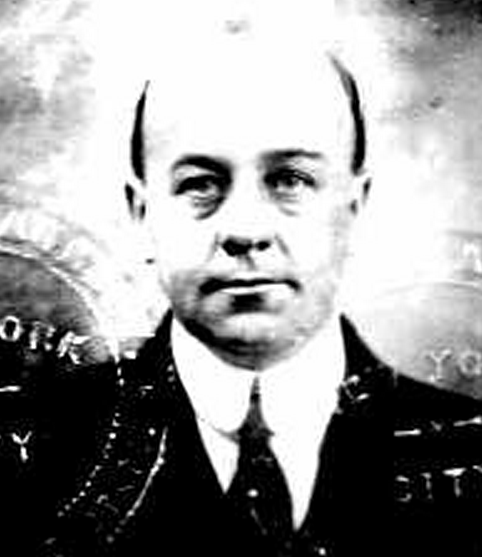
Photograph of Owsley from January 1918 passport application

After the 1905 football season, Owsley worked for the Scovill Manufacturing Company in Waterbury, Connecticut. In June 1906, he underwent surgery for appendicitis and traveled west to recuperate. He accepted a position with Merrill & Ring Lumber Co., at Seattle, Washington, in the fall of 1906. He remained in Seattle until the fall of 1908. Owsley returned to Connecticut in November 1908 to help the Yale football team prepare for its game against Princeton.

Owsley married Helen Blanche Hall in November 1908 at New Haven, Connecticut. Her father, John M. Hall, was the president of the New York, New Haven & Hartford Railroad. Owsley and his wife had two daughters, Julia, born November 27, 1913, and Helen, born August 18, 1920.

From 1908 until at least 1910, Owsley continued to work in the logging business, buying and selling lumber for people in the East. He lived in Seattle and made occasional short trips to the East.

In December 1915, Owsley became employed by Marlin-Rockwell Corporation, the largest producers of machine guns in the world. On January 7, 1918, the company sent a letter in support of a passport application to allow Owsley, then holding the position of assistant general manager, to travel to France to investigate the use of machine guns in aircraft. The letter noted that Owsley was given the charge "to observe the requirements of the airplane program in France as it may apply to the Marlin Aircraft Guns, and return to our organization with the practical information that will enable us to co-operate with the Government in manufacture and shipment to best advantage of all concerned." His application was granted, and he arrived in Liverpool, England, on January 22, 1918, as a passenger on the St. Paul. On July 1, 1918, Marlin-Rockwell submitted an affidavit in support of an application to renew Owsley's passport to allow him to remain in England, noting that his presence was needed to demonstrate the company's Browning machine rifle, Browning machine gun, Barlow bombs, and Marlin aircraft gun, and to observe bomb tests. He returned from Europe on September 30, 1918, as a passenger of the SS Adriatic.

At the time of the 1920 United States census, Owsley was living in New Haven, Connecticut, with his mother-in-law Julia W. Hall, his wife Helen H. Owsley, a daughter Julia Hall Owsley, and four live-in servants. His occupation was listed at that time as the manager of an oil field.

At the time of the 1930 United States census, Owsley was living in New Haven, Connecticut, with his mother-in-law Julia W. Hall, his wife Helen H. Owsley, two daughters, Julia and Helen, and five live-in servants. His occupation was listed at that time as a lumber dealer.

Owsley had developed a reputation as "a wartime production authority in New England" based on his service with Marlin-Rockwell during World War I. In 1940, Owsley helped organize High Standard Manufacturing Company, an armaments company based in New Haven, Connecticut. In October 1940, Owsley secured a $12 million order from the British Purchasing Commission for machine guns to be mounted on airplanes for the Royal Air Force. In 1941 and 1942, Owsley was included on a list compiled by the Treasury Department of the top salary earners in the United States. His salary in 1942 was reported as $421,206, a reduction of $122,000 from his 1941 salary. Owsley served as High Standard's vice president until 1945, continuing thereafter as a director until his retirement in approximately 1948. In a draft registration card completed at the time of World War II, Owsley indicated that he was living at 300 Prospect Street, New Haven, Connecticut, with his wife Helen Hall Owsley, and that he was working for the High Standard Mfg. Co. in Hamden, Connecticut.

Owsley's wife, Helen, died in August 1943. Owsley later remarried to Mary Gunn.

== Head coaching record ==
Year	Team	Overall	Conference	Standing	Bowl/playoffs
Yale Bulldogs (Independent) (1905)
1905	Yale	10–0			
Yale:		10–0			
Navy Midshipmen (Independent) (1925)
1925	Navy	5–2–1			
Navy:		5–2–1			
Total:		15–2–1			
National championship Conference title Conference division title or championship game berth
