= John A. Hartwell =

American physician (1869–1940)

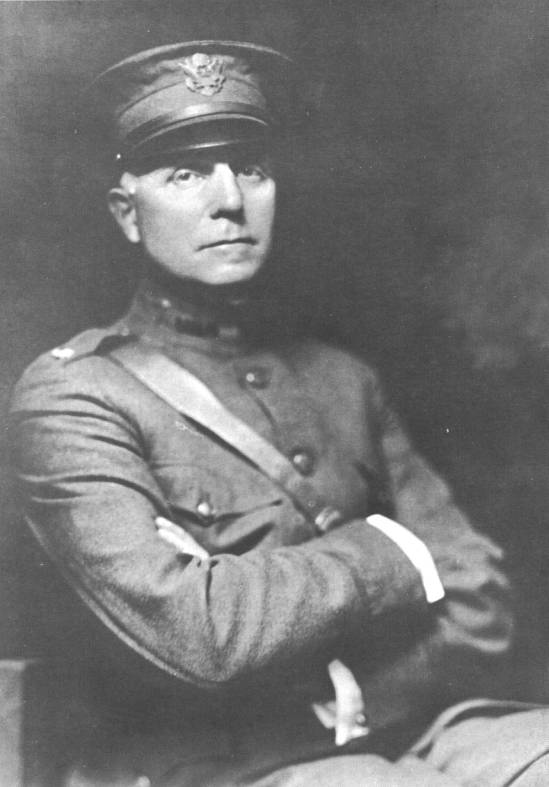
- Hartwell in military uniform, c. 1918

Biographical details
- Born: September 27, 1869; Deckertown, New Jersey, U.S.
- Died: November 30, 1940 (aged 71); Oakdale, New York, U.S.

Playing career
- 1888–1891: Yale
- Position: End

Coaching career (HC unless noted)
- 1892: Lehigh
- 1893: Navy
- 1894: NYU
- 1895: Yale

Head coaching record
- Overall: 21–12–2

Accomplishments and honors

Championships
- 1 national (1895)

Awards
- Consensus All-American (1891)

John Augustus "Josh" Hartwell (September 27, 1869 – November 30, 1940) was an American college football player and coach, military officer, and physician. Hartwell attended Yale University, where he played end for Walter Camp's Bulldogs football team from 1888 to 1891. In 1891, Hartwell was named an All-American for a season in which Yale was unbeaten, untied, unscored against, and later recognized as a national champion by a number of selectors.

Hartwell graduated from Yale in 1892, holding both PhD and MD degrees, and began a career as a surgeon in New York City. He also continued with football as a coach. He served as the head football coach at Lehigh University in 1892, the United States Naval Academy in 1893, New York University in 1894, and at his alma mater in 1895, compiling a career coaching record of 21–12–2. Hartwell's 1895 Yale squad went 13–0–2 and was later recognized as a national champion by Parke H. Davis.

In 1918, Hartwell was commissioned a major in the U.S. Army Medical Corps, with which he served in France during World War I. From 1910 until his retirement in 1938, he was a professor of clinical surgery at Cornell University Medical College. Hartwell was a pioneer of thoracic surgery and an early champion of safe and effective contraception. He was a well-known outdoorsman throughout his life and a friend and caregiver to Theodore Roosevelt.

== Early life and college ==
Hartwell was born on September 27, 1869, in Deckertown, New Jersey, to Samuel Slawson Hartwell, an 1859 graduate of Yale University, and Mary Clarinda (Stiles) Hartwell. John was one of four children born to the couple. The elder Hartwell served as headmaster for a private school, allowing for an easy education to be provided to the family. However, when John was twelve, his mother died, and his father followed he a year later. Other members of the "closely knit family" came and helped the four children, converting the school building into a boarding house. The house provided the family with enough money to live on, and continued to provide education to the children. While in secondary school, John began playing sports and developed a wish to enter the medical field.

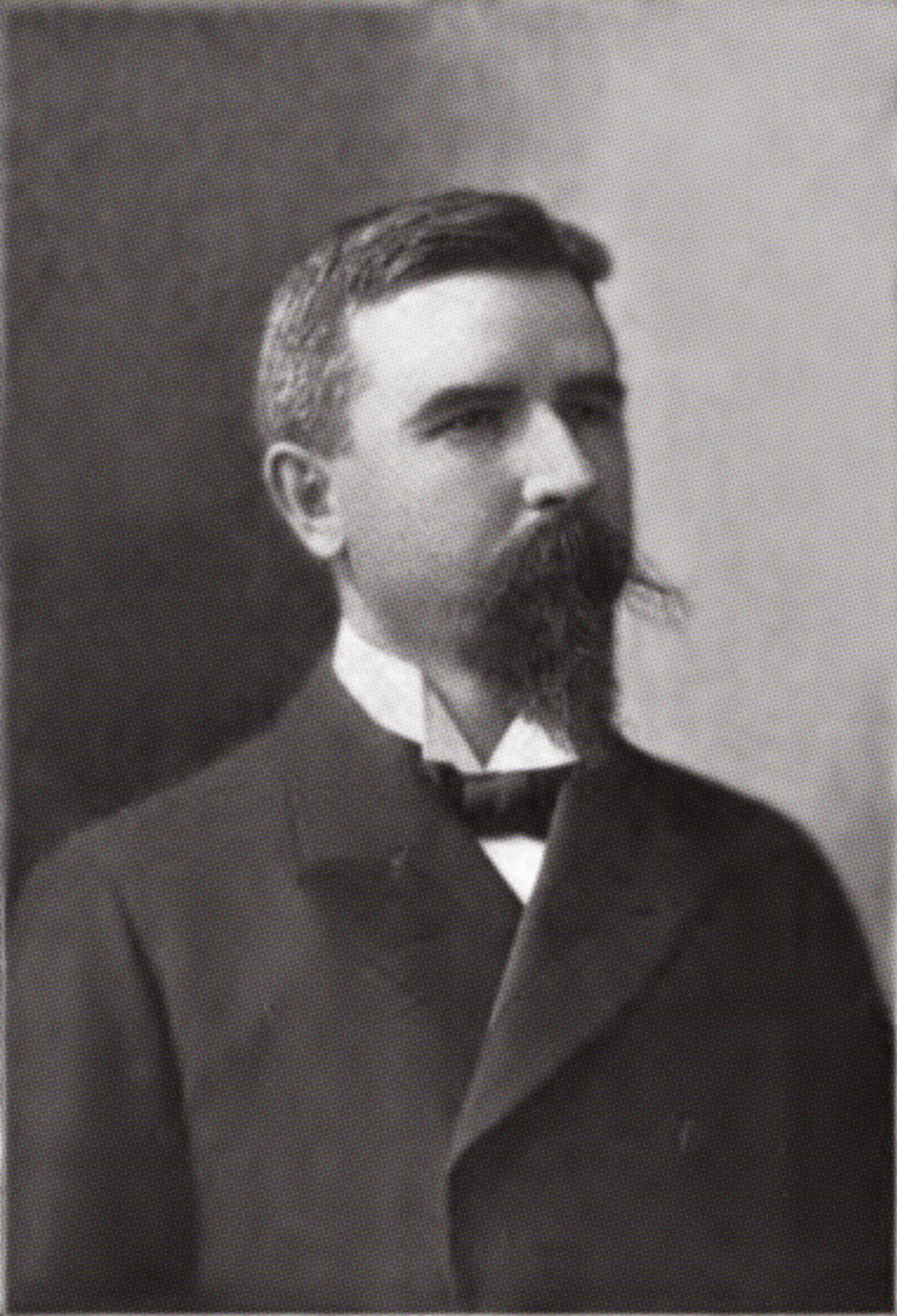
Hartwell served as the assistant professor of physiological chemistry to Russell Henry Chittenden.

In 1885, Hartwell entered biology classes at Yale University, majoring in biology. In order to cover the cost of schooling, Hartwell took up a number of jobs; among them were participating in athletic tests and coaching sports teams during his vacation periods. Hartwell also joined the freshman class's crew team. He was presented with prizes for the awards for Excellence in all the Studies of Freshman Year and Excellence in Physics, as well as being named a member of The Colony and Berzelius club. Hartwell was relatively quiet his sophomore year, quitting the class crew team. However, he was still very competitive in his studies.

The following year, Hartwell rejoined the class crew team and was elected as the junior class president, while continuing to study biology. In his senior year, John Hartwell was elected as the second vice president of the school Y.M.C.A. and received an honorable mention for the Belknap Natural History Prize. He became the starting right end of the Bulldogs football team. The team went 16–1, losing the last game of the season, against Princeton, which Hartwell was not able to play in after suffering a sprained wrist and an injured leg in the rivalry match against Harvard, He was also a starting member of the university crew team, before graduating and earning a Bachelor of Philosophy (Ph.B.).

Immediately afterwards he joined the university's staff and became the assistant for Professor Russell Henry Chittenden, helping to teach physiological chemistry. During that time, he was a graduate student at the Sheffield Scientific School and continued participating on the crew and football teams while teaching. After one year at the school, John Hartwell left, quit teaching, and entered Yale Medical School as a graduate student. Hartwell was elected as the captain of the crew team, and was moved back as the starting right end of the football team. The team shutout all 13 of their opponents, ten of which were major football schools. Although he was taken out of a game against the Crescent Athletic Club for being "out of practice", Hartwell helped out with the team's captain's responsibilities and was named as a consensus member of that year's All-American Team.

Hartwell finished his college career in 1892, having led the crew team to three consecutive victories, from 1888 to 1890, while maintaining his spot as team captain and bow rower No. 6. Hartwell was a well-known member of the football team for four years, where he earned his nickname of old "Josh" Hartwell. That year, he graduated from medical school, finishing at the top of the class and earning his Doctor of Medicine (M.D.) degree cum laude.

== Career ==
=== Coaching and early medical, 1892–1900 ===
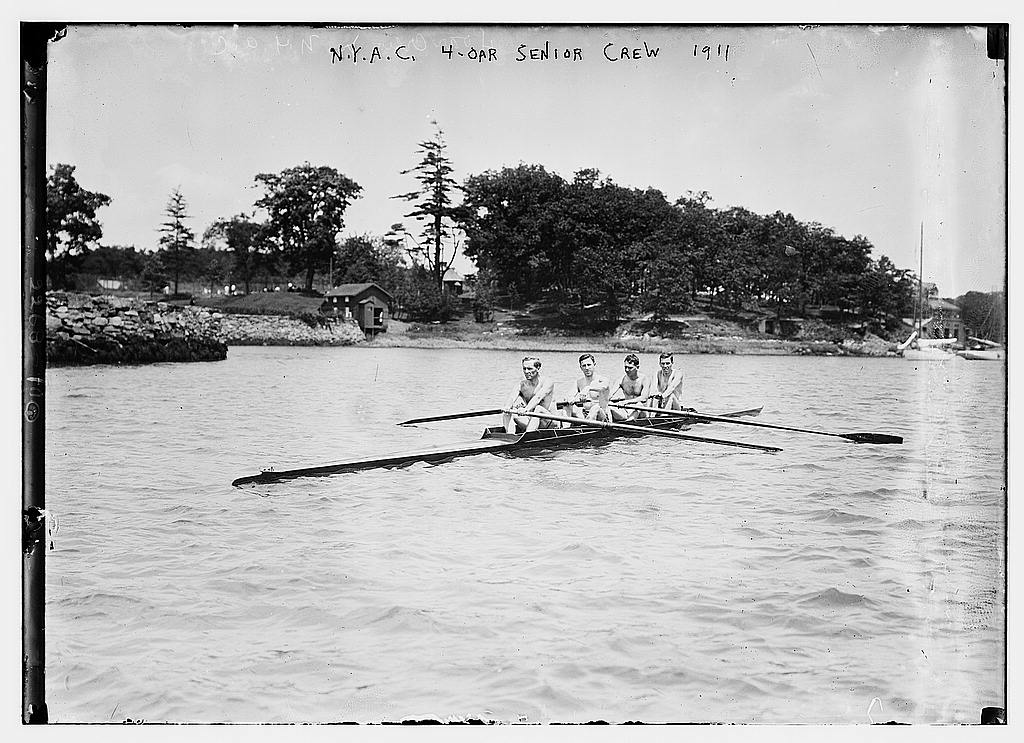
After graduating from college, Hartwell served as coach of the New York Athletic Club crew team (1911 team pictured)

Upon graduation from Sheffield, Hartwell entered graduate classes at Columbia University College of Physicians and Surgeons and graduated from the school the next year. Returning to football, he became the first head coach for the Lehigh Mountain Hawks football team, leading them through the 1892 season. The school had participated in football for eight years previously, all without a coach. In his first ever game coached, Hartwell led the Mountain Hawks to a 51–0 shutout victory over Swarthmore. After the win, Hartwell's squad went on a six-game losing streak, first falling to Princeton, 16–0, and subsequently to the Orange Athletic Club, 8–4, then suffering consecutive blowout losses to Princeton and Cornell, and a 4–0 loss at the hands of Penn. During the streak, the team lost to bitter rival Lafayette, 4–0, ending a nine-game unbeaten streak in the annual competition. The losing streak was broken on November 19, when the team beat Lafayette in the second playing of the rivalry, 15–6. Hartwell concluded his tenure with Lehigh with a 21–0 victory over the Pittsburgh Athletic Club.

After leaving Lehigh, Hartwell took up a job as the coach of the New York Athletic Club's crew team, holding the position for the season. In March 1893, Hartwell took over as the coach of the Yale crew team, leading several former teammates. Hartwell began as a one-week replacement for then-coaches Alfred Cowles, Jr. and Fred Stephenson, and was hired as an assistant coach along with John Rogers, holding the position for over two months. During that time, Hartwell remained involved with other Yale sports, at one point betting $1000 (equivalent to $35,800 respectively in 2025) on a tense baseball game between Cornell and Yale (Yale won 5–1). (Note: United States nominal Gross Domestic Product per capita figures follow the "Measuring Worth" series supplied in Lawrence H. Officer (2013), "What Was the U.S. GDP Then?" MeasuringWorth. These figures follow the figures as of 2011.)

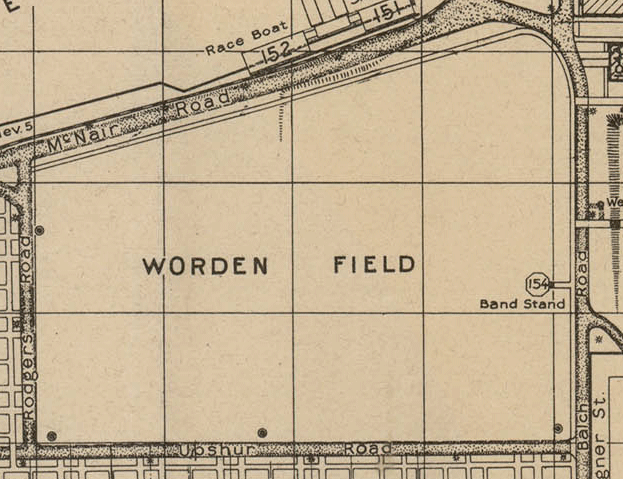
Worden Field, on the Naval Academy campus, is where Hartwell's Navy team hosted all of its games for the 1893 season.

Later that year, Hartwell was hired as head coach for the United States Naval Academy's football team. He replaced fellow Yale football player and 1892 alumni Ben Crosby, who had died late the previous year from typhoid fever he contracted while coaching the Navy team. Hartwell began his tenure with Navy in a 34–0 blowout loss to Penn. The game was followed by two shutout wins, before Hartwell was defeated by his former team, Lehigh, 12–6. The team recovered, the next week beating Georgetown, 22–10, at home. After that game, Hartwell took a short break from coaching and played at left end with the New York Athletic Club in a game against Yale. Although The Sun stated that Hartwell "made monkeys of the Yale players" and recorded several tackles, his team was blown out. Returning to his job Hartwell's team won in a blowout victory over the Franklin & Marshall Diplomats, followed by a 12–0 shutout loss to Virginia. Navy ended their season with a 6–4 defeat of Army in the annual Army–Navy Game. The contest was described as "so bloody" due to multiple large fistfights breaking out between fans in the stands that the game was banned by president Grover Cleveland, and did not return until 1899 at the insisting of Theodore Roosevelt.

== Later life and death ==
Hartwell died on November 30, 1940, of a heart attack at the South Side Sportsmen's Club in Oakdale, New York.

== Writings ==
During his medical career, Hartwell was a prolific writer, authoring 133 articles in a number of different publications. His first published article was written while he was still an undergraduate, co-authoring two papers with Rusell Chittenden. He covered a number of topics, from cancer to methods of blood transfusion. Among his many works were:

- Chittenden, RH; Hartwell, JA (November 1890). "Crystalline Globulin and Globuloses, or Vitelloses". The Journal of Physiology. 11 (6): 435–47. doi:10.1113/jphysiol.1890.sp000344. ISSN 0022-3751. PMC 1514203. PMID 16991929.
- Chittenden, RH; Hartwell, JA (April 1891). "The Relative Formation of Proteoses and Peptones in Gastric Digestion". The Journal of Physiology. 12 (1): 12–22. doi:10.1113/jphysiol.1891.sp000362. ISSN 0022-3751. PMC 1514217. PMID 16991958.
- Hartwell, John A. (September 1905). "The Radical Treatment of Cancer of the Rectum: With Particular Reference to the Value of Inguinal Colostomy". Annals of Surgery. 42 (3): 399–444. doi:10.1097/00000658-190509000-00005. ISSN 0003-4932. PMC 1426016. PMID 17861685.
- Hartwell, John A. (July 1908). "The Question of Operation for Non-penetrating Intracranial Trauma". Annals of Surgery. 48 (1): 25–49. doi:10.1097/00000658-190807000-00007. ISSN 0003-4932. PMC 1406864. PMID 17862197.
- Hartwell, JA; Butler, EF (October 1918). "Application of the Teachings of War Surgery to Civil Hospital Conditions". The Journal of Surgery, Gynecology, and Obstetrics. 27: 377. ISSN 0039-6087. OCLC 60760831.

== Head coaching record ==
Year	Team	Overall	Conference	Standing	Bowl/playoffs
Lehigh (Independent) (1892)
1892	Lehigh	3–6			
Lehigh:		3–6			
Navy Midshipmen (Independent) (1893)
1893	Navy	5–3			
Navy:		5–3			
NYU Violets (Independent) (1894)
1894	NYU	0–3			
NYU:		0–3			
Yale Bulldogs (Independent) (1895)
1895	Yale	13–0–2			
Yale:		13–0–2			
Total:		21–12–2			
National championship Conference title Conference division title or championship game berth

== See also ==
- History of American football
- History of birth control
