= Lucy Ferguson VanMeter =

American judge

Judge-elect of the Kentucky Court of Appeals
- Assuming office January 4, 2027
- Succeeding: Will Moynahan

Judge of Kentucky's 22nd Judicial Circuit
- Incumbent
- Assumed office January 1, 2019
- Preceded by: John Edwards Reynolds

Personal details
- Born: Paris, Kentucky
- Spouse(s): Laurance B. VanMeter; Joel Pett (divorced)
- Education: DePauw University (BA); University of Kentucky (JD)

Lucy Ferguson VanMeter is an American attorney and jurist from Kentucky who is a judge-elect of the Kentucky Court of Appeals. Since 2018, she has served as a judge of Kentucky's 22nd judicial circuit.

She is married to Laurance B. VanMeter, who served as a justice of the Kentucky Supreme Court from 2017 to 2025, and as chief justice of the court from 2023 to 2025.

== Early life and education ==
Lucy Ferguson was born in Paris, Kentucky, to Matthew and Virginia (Hale) Ferguson. Her father was an electrician and U.S. Air Force veteran. She graduated from Bourbon County High School in 1993 before going on to attend DePauw University in Greencastle, Indiana. She graduated from DePauw with a Bachelor of Arts degree with honors in 1997, and thereafter returned to Kentucky where she graduated with a Juris Doctor degree with honors from the University of Kentucky College of Law in 2001.

== Career ==
=== Private practice ===
After receiving her law degree, VanMeter joined the Lexington office of the law firm Stoll Keenon & Park. She remained with the firm until her election as a circuit judge in 2018, becoming an equity partner while specializing in personal injury suits as well as insurance and contract disputes. One of her most notable cases was her representation of the family of Amanda Ross in the wrongful death suit they filed against her ex-fiancée, Steve Nunn. Nunn was a former member of the Kentucky House of Representatives and son of Governor Louie Nunn, who murdered Ross in 2009. VanMeter obtained a judgment for $24 million in both actual and punitive damages against Nunn 2013.

From 2017 to 2018, VanMeter served as president of the Fayette County Bar Association.

=== Circuit court judge ===
Following the retirement of Judge James Ishmael of Kentucky's 22nd judicial circuit in December 2017, Governor Matt Bevin appointed trial attorney John Edwards Reynolds to serve for the remainder of Ishmael's term. VanMeter challenged Reynolds in the subsequent election for a full term in November 2018, and won with 66,763 votes (70%). She was reelected unopposed in 2022.

During her tenure she presided over several high profile cases, including the rape trial of politician John Tilley.

=== Kentucky Court of Appeals ===
==== Election ====
In 2024, incumbent judge Pamela R. Goodwine of the Kentucky Court of Appeals was elected to the Kentucky Supreme Court. VanMeter was one of three names submitted to Governor Andy Beshear by the state's judicial nominating committee to be appointed to Goodwine's vacant seat. In April 2025 however, Beshear chose to appoint Will Moynahan, an assistant United States Attorney for the Eastern District of Kentucky.

VanMeter announced later that month that she would be challenging Moynahan in 2026. Following Beshear's endorsement of Moynahan during the race, the Kentucky Judicial Campaign Conduct Committee raised concerns regarding the continuing encroachment of partisanship into nonpartisan judicial races. The committee continued to raise this alarm throughout the race, as Beshear's super PAC and Democratic leaders supported Moynahan while VanMeter received bipartisan support from both Republican lawmakers and former Democratic elected officials. VanMeter ultimately defeated Moynahan, winning the race with 59% of the vote.

== Personal life ==
VanMeter married Laurance B. VanMeter in August 2017, who was then a justice of the Kentucky Supreme Court, and who would go on to serve as chief justice of the court from 2023 until his retirement in 2025. She was previously married to Joel Pett, a cartoonist for the Lexington Herald-Leader who received the 2000 pulitzer prize for editorial cartooning.
