= Jackson School =

Jackson School may refer to the following in the United States:

- University School of Jackson, Jackson, Tennessee, college prep school
- Jackson City School, K-12 school in Jackson, Kentucky
- Jackson School of Global Affairs, Yale University, New Haven, Connecticut
- Jackson Jr. High School, Sandusky, Ohio, listed on the NRHP in Sandusky, Ohio
- Jackson School (Enid, Oklahoma), NRHP-listed
- Jackson School (St. Louis, Missouri), listed on the NRHP in St. Louis, Missouri
- Jackson School of International Studies, University of Washington, Seattle, Washington
- Sheldon Jackson School, listed on the National Register of Historic Places (NRHP), Sitka, Alaska
- Stonewall Jackson School (Virginia), Richmond, Virginia, NRHP-listed

Andrew Jackson School may refer to:

- Andrew Jackson Academy, of Prince George's County Public Schools, in Forestville, Maryland
- Andrew Jackson Language Academy, of Chicago Public Schools, Chicago, Illinois
- Andrew Jackson High School (Jacksonville, Florida)
- Andrew Jackson School, Philadelphia, Pennsylvania (listed in the NRHP as "Federal Street School" and renamed "Fanny Jackson Coppin School" in 2021)

== See also ==
- Jackson College (disambiguation)
- Jackson University (disambiguation)
- Jackson High School (disambiguation)
- Jackson Elementary School (disambiguation)
- Jackson Academy (disambiguation)
