= Jackson High School =

Jackson High School is the name of several high schools in the United States:

- Jackson High School (Alabama), Jackson, Alabama
- Jackson High School (Georgia), Jackson, Georgia
- Jackson High School (Michigan), Jackson, Michigan
- Jackson High School (Missouri), Jackson, Missouri
- Jackson High School (Jackson, Ohio)
- Jackson High School (Stark County, Ohio)
- Jackson High School (Oregon), Portland, Oregon
- Andrew Jackson High School (Indiana), South Bend, Indiana
- Andrew Jackson High School (Jacksonville), Florida
- Andrew Jackson High School (Queens), New York, New York
- Andrew Jackson High School (South Carolina), Kershaw, South Carolina
- Henry M. Jackson High School, Mill Creek, Washington
- Jackson Memorial High School, Jackson Township, New Jersey
- Miami Jackson High School, Miami, Florida
- The high school component of Jackson City School, a K-12 facility in Jackson, Kentucky

== See also ==
- Stonewall Jackson High School (disambiguation)
- A. Y. Jackson Secondary School (disambiguation)
- Jackson Middle School (disambiguation)
- Jackson School (disambiguation)
