= Stonewall Jackson School =

Stonewall Jackson School may refer to:

- Stonewall Jackson Youth Development Center or Stonewall Jackson School, Concord, North Carolina
- Stonewall Jackson Middle School, currently Yolanda Black Navarro Middle School, a Houston Independent School District school, Texas
- Stonewall Jackson Middle School, a Hanover County Public School, Mechanicsville, Virginia -now Bell Creek Middle School.
- Stonewall Jackson School (Virginia), Richmond, Virginia

== See also ==
- Stonewall Jackson Elementary School (disambiguation)
- Stonewall Jackson High School (disambiguation)
