= Richmond–VMI football rivalry =

American college football rivalry

- VMI Keydets Richmond Spiders
- Sport: Football
- First meeting: November 10, 1893; VMI 34, Richmond 0
- Latest meeting: September 20, 2025; Richmond 38, VMI 14
- Next meeting: August 28, 2032
- Trophy: None

Statistics
- Total meetings: 91
- All-time series: Richmond leads, 46–40–5
- Largest victory: VMI, 79–0 (1901)
- Longest win streak: Richmond, 13 (1997–present)
- Current win streak: Richmond, 13 (1997–present)

Locations of Richmond and VMI

The Richmond–VMI football rivalry is a college football rivalry played between the VMI Keydets and the Richmond Spiders, representing the Virginia Military Institute and University of Richmond, respectively. The series began in 1893, two years after VMI fielded its first football team in 1891, and three years after Richmond's first football team was formed in 1890.

Aside from one year in 1992 in which the game was played in Norfolk, Virginia, the series has always been played at either VMI or Richmond.

== History ==
Founded in 1839 on the site of the Lexington state arsenal, the Virginia Military Institute, the nation's oldest state-supported military college, first began football in 1873 which featured a one-game season, though the first official team was not fielded until 18 years later in 1891. The Keydets play their home games at 10,000-seat Alumni Memorial Field, their home since 1962.

The University of Richmond, a private, nonsectarian university, was founded in 1830 as "Richmond College". The Spiders began playing football in 1890, and won their first national championship in 2008 by defeating Montana 24–7. Richmond plays their home games at 7,800-seat E. Claiborne Robins Stadium.

The series began in 1893, and VMI won the first five contests, all of which were shutouts. The Keydets also won 12 of the first 14 games, though the series has shifted in Richmond's favor in the last few decades, as the Spiders have won 21 of the last 23 games dating back to 1983. In all, 90 games have been played as of 2015, the most games played against a single opponent for VMI. Both schools were members of the Southern Conference for several decades until Richmond became an independent in 1977, where they now play in the Colonial Athletic Association. Richmond currently holds a 12-game winning streak in the series, and VMI has not won since 1996.

== Game results ==
VMI victories	Richmond victories	Tie games

No.	Date	Location	Winner	Score
1	November 10, 1893	Lexington, VA	VMI	34–0
2	November 11, 1895	Lexington, VA	VMI	44–0
3	October 29, 1898	Lexington, VA	VMI	16–0
4	October 28, 1901	Lexington, VA	VMI	79–0
5	October 25, 1902	Lexington, VA	VMI	33–0
6	November 17, 1906	Richmond, VA	Richmond	6–4
7	November 4, 1911	Lexington, VA	VMI	38–0
8	October 3, 1914	Lexington, VA	VMI	10–0
9	October 6, 1915	Lexington, VA	VMI	13–6
10	September 25, 1926	Lexington, VA	VMI	10–0
11	September 24, 1927	Lexington, VA	VMI	22–0
12	September 29, 1928	Lexington, VA	Tie	6–6
13	September 28, 1929	Lexington, VA	VMI	40–0
14	September 27, 1930	Lexington, VA	VMI	12–0
15	September 26, 1931	Lexington, VA	Richmond	7–0
16	November 12, 1932	Richmond, VA	Richmond	7–0
17	November 18, 1933	Richmond, VA	Richmond	15–0
18	October 20, 1934	Richmond, VA	Richmond	7–0
19	October 12, 1935	Lexington, VA	Richmond	13–6
20	October 24, 1936	Richmond, VA	VMI	20–0
21	October 16, 1937	Richmond, VA	VMI	21–7
22	October 15, 1938	Richmond, VA	VMI	13–6
23	November 4, 1939	Richmond, VA	Tie	0–0
24	October 26, 1940	Richmond, VA	Richmond	9–7
25	October 25, 1941	Richmond, VA	VMI	25–7
26	October 24, 1942	Richmond, VA	VMI	20–6
27	October 16, 1943	Richmond, VA	Richmond	27–0
28	October 7, 1944	Richmond, VA	VMI	26–20
29	September 29, 1945	Richmond, VA	VMI	40–6
30	September 28, 1946	Richmond, VA	Tie	7–7
31	October 18, 1947	Richmond, VA	Richmond	21–20
32	October 16, 1948	Richmond, VA	VMI	9–0
33	October 19, 1949	Richmond, VA	VMI	14–7
34	October 7, 1950	Richmond, VA	VMI	26–14
35	September 29, 1951	Richmond, VA	VMI	34–0
36	October 4, 1952	Lexington, VA	VMI	28–14
37	October 3, 1953	Richmond, VA	Richmond	13–7
38	October 2, 1954	Richmond, VA	VMI	19–6
39	October 1, 1955	Lexington, VA	Richmond	21–0
40	October 6, 1956	Richmond, VA	VMI	35–20
41	October 5, 1957	Richmond, VA	VMI	28–6
42	October 4, 1958	Lexington, VA	VMI	12–6
43	October 3, 1959	Lexington, VA	Tie	14–14
44	October 1, 1960	Lexington, VA	VMI	21–6
45	September 29, 1961	Richmond, VA	VMI	8–6
46	September 28, 1962	Richmond, VA	VMI	21–0

No.	Date	Location	Winner	Score
47	October 25, 1963	Richmond, VA	Tie	7–7
48	September 26, 1964	Richmond, VA	Richmond	20–14
49	November 6, 1965	Lexington, VA	VMI	21–14
50	October 7, 1966	Richmond, VA	VMI	34–20
51	September 30, 1967	Richmond, VA	Richmond	3–0
52	November 2, 1968	Richmond, VA	Richmond	35–0
53	September 27, 1969	Lexington, VA	Richmond	20–0
54	November 14, 1970	Richmond, VA	Richmond	40–17
55	October 16, 1971	Richmond, VA	Richmond	21–6
56	September 30, 1972	Richmond, VA	Richmond	34–15
57	September 22, 1973	Richmond, VA	Richmond	35–0
58	November 2, 1974	Richmond, VA	Richmond	17–14
59	October 18, 1975	Richmond, VA	Richmond	24–19
60	September 25, 1976	Richmond, VA	Richmond	43–0
61	October 8, 1977	Lexington, VA	VMI	25–0
62	October 14, 1978	Richmond, VA	VMI	23–6
63	September 15, 1979	Lexington, VA	VMI	17–7
64	October 8, 1980	Richmond, VA	VMI	22–17
65	November 7, 1981	Lexington, VA	Richmond	45–14
66	October 23, 1982	Richmond, VA	VMI	14–0
67	October 29, 1983	Lexington, VA	Richmond	35–19
68	October 27, 1984	Richmond, VA	Richmond	45–3
69	September 21, 1985	Lexington, VA	Richmond	28–14
70	October 18, 1986	Richmond, VA	Richmond	40–9
71	September 17, 1988	Lexington, VA	Richmond	14–13
72	September 23, 1989	Richmond, VA	Richmond	27–22
73	September 28, 1991	Richmond, VA	VMI	38–27
74	October 24, 1992	Norfolk, VA	Richmond	41–18
75	September 4, 1993	Richmond, VA	Richmond	38–14
76	September 3, 1994	Lexington, VA	Richmond	34–31
77	September 2, 1995	Richmond, VA	Richmond	51–28
78	November 9, 1996	Lexington, VA	VMI	20–7
79	September 20, 1997	Richmond, VA	Richmond	56–3
80	September 4, 1999	Richmond, VA	Richmond	42–6
81	October 25, 2003	Richmond, VA	Richmond	35–25
82	September 11, 2004	Lexington, VA	Richmond	34–7
83	November 5, 2005	Richmond, VA	Richmond	38–3
84	September 16, 2006	Richmond, VA	Richmond	58–7
85	October 4, 2008	Lexington, VA	Richmond	56–16
86	September 26, 2009	Richmond, VA	Richmond	38–28
87	September 17, 2011	Richmond, VA	Richmond	34–19
88	September 15, 2012	Lexington, VA	Richmond	47–6
89	August 31, 2013	Richmond, VA	Richmond	34–0
90	September 19, 2015	Richmond, VA	Richmond	42–10
91	September 20, 2025	Richmond, VA	Richmond	38–14
Series: Richmond leads 46–40–5

- Source: 2013 VMI Football Fact Book

== See also ==
- List of NCAA college football rivalry games
