= Jackson Elementary School =

There are a number of Elementary schools named Jackson Elementary School:

- Andrew Jackson Elementary School in Philadelphia
- Jackson Elementary School (Santa Ana, California)
- Jackson Elementary School (Green Bay, Wisconsin)
- Jackson Elementary School (Abbotsford, Canada)
- Jackson City School or Herbert W. Spencer School (Jackson, Kentucky)

== See also ==
- Jackson School (disambiguation)
