= 1891 Kentucky State College Blue and Yellow football team =

American college football season

1891 Kentucky State College Blue and Yellow football
- Conference: Independent
- Record: 1–1
- Head coach: S. M. Pottinger & J. P. Selby (1st season)
- Captain: John Bryan

1891 Southern college football independents records
| | Conf. | | | Overall |
| Team | W | L | T | W | | L | | T |
|---|---|---|---|---|---|---|---|---|
| Trinity (NC) | | – | | 3 | – | 0 | – | 0 |
| Wake Forest | | – | | 1 | – | 0 | – | 0 |
| VMI | | – | | 3 | – | 0 | – | 1 |
| Vanderbilt | | – | | 3 | – | 1 | – | 0 |
| Navy | | – | | 5 | – | 2 | – | 0 |
| Virginia | | – | | 2 | – | 1 | – | 2 |
| Delaware | | – | | 5 | – | 3 | – | 1 |
| Kentucky State College | | – | | 1 | – | 1 | – | 0 |
| Georgetown | | – | | 2 | – | 2 | – | 0 |
| Sewanee | | – | | 1 | – | 2 | – | 0 |
| Central (KY) | | – | | 0 | – | 1 | – | 0 |
| Furman | | – | | 0 | – | 1 | – | 0 |
| Tennessee | | – | | 0 | – | 1 | – | 0 |
| West Virginia | | – | | 0 | – | 1 | – | 0 |
| Johns Hopkins | | – | | 0 | – | 2 | – | 0 |
| North Carolina | | – | | 0 | – | 2 | – | 0 |
| Richmond | | – | | 0 | – | 2 | – | 0 |

The 1891 Kentucky State College Blue and Yellow football team represented Kentucky State College—now known as the University of Kentucky—as an independent during the 1891 college football season. The 1891 team's colors were blue and light yellow, decided before the Centre–Kentucky game on December 19. A student asked "What color blue?" and varsity letterman Richard C. Stoll pulled off his necktie, and held it up. This is still held as the origin of Kentucky's shade of blue. The next year light yellow was dropped and changed to white.

== Schedule ==
| Date | Opponent | Site | Result | Source |
|---|---|---|---|---|
| April 10 | Georgetown (KY) | Lexington, KY | W 8–2 | |
| December 12 | Kentucky University | Lexington, KY | cancelled | |
| December 19 | Centre | Lexington, KY (rivalry) | L 0–10 | |
