= Dana Rucker =

American football player and coach (1868–1949)

Biographical details
- Born: January 28, 1868; Fauquier County, Virginia, U.S.
- Died: February 1, 1949 (aged 81); Richmond, Virginia, U.S.

Playing career
- 1887: Richmond
- 1889: Richmond
- 1891: Richmond
- 1893: Richmond

Coaching career (HC unless noted)
- 1891: Richmond
- 1893–1895: Richmond

Head coaching record
- Overall: 3–13–3

Dana Henry Rucker (January 28, 1868 – February 1, 1949) was an American college football player and coach. He coached football at Richmond College for four seasons in the 1890s.

== Early life and education ==
Dana Henry Rucker was born in 1868 in Delaplane, Virginia, to Annie (née Chapplalier) and William A. Rucker. He graduated from Richmond College (later the University of Richmond). Later, at age 60, he received a Master of Arts from Columbia University.

== Career ==
Following graduation, Rucker taught at a private school ran by Merritt Noley in Richmond. He taught several years at Staunton Military Academy. He was then principal at Stonewall Jackson School and William Fox School for more than 50 years. He was the seventh head football coach at Richmond College serving for four seasons, in 1891 and again from 1893 to 1895, and compiling record of 3–13–3. Rucker also worked in education at the high school level.

Rucker started the first public school garden in Richmond and was an examiner for the Richmond Boy Scouts. During World War I, he volunteered for the YMCA and served as a guide to the military personnel at the Louvre. He lectured on sculpture, art and botany. He was responsible for an ordnance that abolished fireworks in Richmond and established a practice of physical examination of school children that participate in athletic events.

== Personal life ==
Rucker married Lulie Harrison, daughter of Edmund Harrison. They had three sons and one daughter, Dana H., Edmund H., W. Harrison and Mrs. Frank Beazley. He was a deacon of the Grove Avenue Baptist Church for more than 40 years.

Rucker died on February 1, 1949, at his home on Hanover Avenue in Richmond. He was buried in Hollywood Cemetery.

== Head coaching record ==
| Year | Team | Overall | Conference | Standing | Bowl/playoffs |
|---|---|---|---|---|---|
Richmond Colts (Independent) (1891)
| 1891 | Richmond | 0–2 | | | |
Richmond Spiders (Independent) (1893–1895)
| 1893 | Richmond | 3–2 | | | |
| 1894 | Richmond | 0–4–2 | | | |
| 1895 | Richmond | 0–5–1 | | | |
| Richmond: | | 3–13–3 | | | |
| Total: | | 3–13–3 | | | |
