= 2024 Kentucky Supreme Court election =

2024 Kentucky Supreme Court 5th district election
- November 5, 2024
- District 5
Candidate	Pamela R. Goodwine	Erin Izzo
Popular vote	183,821	55,085
Percentage	76.94%	23.06%
- County results Goodwine: 60–70% 70–80% 80–90%
Justice before election
Laurance B. VanMeter
Elected Justice
Pamela R. Goodwine

The 2024 Kentucky Supreme Court election was held in the 5th district of the Kentucky Supreme Court on November 5, 2024. The court consists of seven justices elected in nonpartisan elections to staggered eight-year terms. District 5, composed of eight counties in the Lexington area, (Note: Bourbon, Clark, Fayette, Franklin, Jessamine, Madison, Scott, and Woodford Counties.) was the only district up for election in 2024.

In September 2023, incumbent justice Laurance B. VanMeter announced that he would not seek reelection. Two candidates filed for the seat: appellate judge Pamela R. Goodwine and attorney Erin Izzo. Goodwine received support from Democratic politicians such as Kentucky governor Andy Beshear. Before the election, it was noted that the outcome of the election could impact the ideological balance of the court, which in previous years had issued contentious rulings on subjects such as abortion and redistricting.

Goodwine defeated Izzo in the election, with over three quarters of the vote. The outcome was marked as shifting the court to the political left.

== Candidates ==
- Pamela R. Goodwine (Lexington), judge of the 5th Court of Appeals district (2018–2025), the 22nd Circuit Court (2003–2018), and the 22nd District Court (1999–2003)
- Erin Izzo (Frankfort), arbitrator and mediator

== Endorsements ==
Pamela R. Goodwine

Statewide officials

- Andy Beshear, governor of Kentucky (2019–present)

Organizations

- The Fairness Campaign
- In This Together PAC
- Kentuckians for the Commonwealth New Power PAC
- Kentucky AFL-CIO
- United Auto Workers
Erin Izzo

Organizations

- The Republican Party of Bourbon County
- The Republican Party of Clark County
- The Republican Party of Fayette County
- The Republican Party of Franklin County
- The Republican Party of Jessamine County
- The Republican Party of Madison County

== Results ==
2024 Kentucky Supreme Court 5th district election
Candidate	Votes	%
Pamela R. Goodwine	183,821	76.94
Erin Izzo	55,085	23.06
Total votes	238,906	100.0

== See also ==
- 2024 Kentucky elections
