= 1891 Virginia Orange and Blue football team =

American college football season

1891 Virginia Orange and Blue football
- Conference: Independent
- Record: 2–1–2
- Head coach: None
- Captain: Oliver W. Catchings
- Home stadium: Madison Hall Field

1891 Southern college football independents records
	Conf.			Overall
Team	W	L	T	W		L		T
Trinity (NC)		–		3	–	0	–	0
Wake Forest		–		1	–	0	–	0
VMI		–		3	–	0	–	1
Vanderbilt		–		3	–	1	–	0
Navy		–		5	–	2	–	0
Virginia		–		2	–	1	–	2
Delaware		–		5	–	3	–	1
Kentucky State College		–		1	–	1	–	0
Georgetown		–		2	–	2	–	0
Sewanee		–		1	–	2	–	0
Central (KY)		–		0	–	1	–	0
Furman		–		0	–	1	–	0
Tennessee		–		0	–	1	–	0
West Virginia		–		0	–	1	–	0
Johns Hopkins		–		0	–	2	–	0
North Carolina		–		0	–	2	–	0
Richmond		–		0	–	2	–	0

The 1891 Virginia Orange and Blue football team represented the University of Virginia as an independent during the 1891 college football season.

== Schedule ==
Date	Opponent	Site	Result	Attendance	Source
November 14	vs. St. John's (MD)	Madison Hall Field; Charlottesville, VA	W 34–0		
November 16	Schuylkill Navy	Madison Hall Field; Charlottesville, VA	T 16–16		
November 20	Lafayette	Madison Hall Field; Charlottesville, VA	T 6–6		
November 23	Princeton JV	Madison Hall Field; Charlottesville, VA	W 12–0		
November 28	vs. Trinity (NC)	Island Park; Richmond, VA	L 0–20	1,200	
