= 1891 Trinity Blue and White football team =

American college football season

1891 Trinity Blue and White football

Southern champion
- Conference: Independent
- Record: 3–0
- Head coach: None
- Captain: Tom Daniels

1891 Southern college football independents records
| | Conf. | | | Overall |
| Team | W | L | T | W | | L | | T |
|---|---|---|---|---|---|---|---|---|
| Trinity (NC) | | – | | 3 | – | 0 | – | 0 |
| Wake Forest | | – | | 1 | – | 0 | – | 0 |
| VMI | | – | | 3 | – | 0 | – | 1 |
| Vanderbilt | | – | | 3 | – | 1 | – | 0 |
| Navy | | – | | 5 | – | 2 | – | 0 |
| Virginia | | – | | 2 | – | 1 | – | 2 |
| Delaware | | – | | 5 | – | 3 | – | 1 |
| Kentucky State College | | – | | 1 | – | 1 | – | 0 |
| Georgetown | | – | | 2 | – | 2 | – | 0 |
| Sewanee | | – | | 1 | – | 2 | – | 0 |
| Central (KY) | | – | | 0 | – | 1 | – | 0 |
| Furman | | – | | 0 | – | 1 | – | 0 |
| Tennessee | | – | | 0 | – | 1 | – | 0 |
| West Virginia | | – | | 0 | – | 1 | – | 0 |
| Johns Hopkins | | – | | 0 | – | 2 | – | 0 |
| North Carolina | | – | | 0 | – | 2 | – | 0 |
| Richmond | | – | | 0 | – | 2 | – | 0 |

The 1891 Trinity Blue and White football team represented Trinity College (today known as Duke University) in the 1891 college football season. The team went 3–0 and beat its opponents by a combined score of 122 to 4. The team claimed a Southern championship.

The 1891 team was led by senior player and captain Tom Daniels, who later played for Auburn University.

== Schedule ==
| Date | Opponent | Site | Result | Attendance | Source |
|---|---|---|---|---|---|
| November 14 | vs. Furman | Columbia, SC | W 96–0 | | |
| November 20 | at North Carolina | Chapel Hill, NC (rivalry) | W 6–4 | | |
| November 28 | vs. Virginia | Island Park; Richmond, VA | W 20–0 | 1,200 | |
