= Christian Business Men's Connection =

International evangelical Christian organization

Christian Business Men's Connection (CBMC) is an international evangelical Christian mission organization that exists to reach out to businessmen. CBMC began in Chicago in 1930, joined with other similar groups to create a national organization in 1937, and moved its headquarters to Chattanooga, Tennessee, in 1978. Among its prominent early leaders, as the Christian Business Men's Committee International, was inventor and industrialist R. G. LeTourneau. Timothy N. Philpot was President of CBMC International from July 1996 to September 2003.

According to the organization there are now 18,000 members in 700 teams in the US, and international branches in over 70 countries with over 50,000 members.
