= 1891 Delaware football team =

American college football season

1891 Delaware football
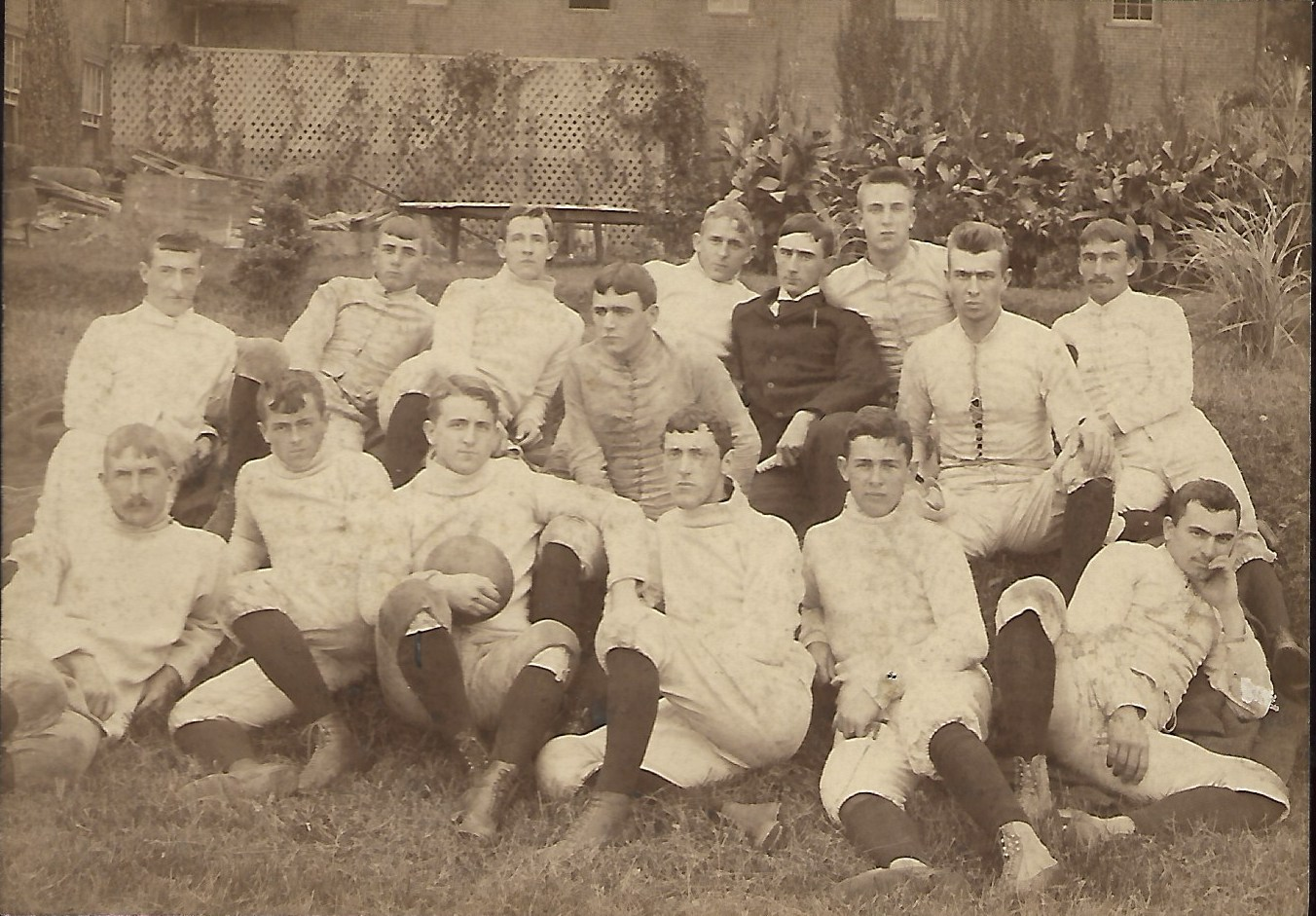
- Conference: Independent
- Record: 5–3–1
- Head coach: None

1891 Southern college football independents records
	Conf.			Overall
Team	W	L	T	W		L		T
Trinity (NC)		–		3	–	0	–	0
Wake Forest		–		1	–	0	–	0
VMI		–		3	–	0	–	1
Vanderbilt		–		3	–	1	–	0
Navy		–		5	–	2	–	0
Virginia		–		2	–	1	–	2
Delaware		–		5	–	3	–	1
Kentucky State College		–		1	–	1	–	0
Georgetown		–		2	–	2	–	0
Sewanee		–		1	–	2	–	0
Central (KY)		–		0	–	1	–	0
Furman		–		0	–	1	–	0
Tennessee		–		0	–	1	–	0
West Virginia		–		0	–	1	–	0
Johns Hopkins		–		0	–	2	–	0
North Carolina		–		0	–	2	–	0
Richmond		–		0	–	2	–	0

The 1891 Delaware football team represented Delaware College—now known as the University of Delaware—as an independent during the 1891 college football season.

== Schedule ==
Date	Opponent	Site	Result	Source
October 3	at Haverford	Haverford, PA	L 0–18	
October 10	Wilmington YMCA		W 58–0	
October 17	St. John's (MD)		L 4–16	
October 24	at Shortlidge Academy	Media, PA	L 0–6	
October 27	Franklin (Baltimore)		T 6–6	
October 31	Del. Field Club of Wilmington	Wilmington, DE	W 4–0	
November 6	Washington College		W 10–0	
November 14	Warren Club of Wilmington	Wilmington, DE	W 30–0	
November 21	Shortlidge Academy		W 14–12	
