= 1891 Sewanee Tigers football team =

American college football season

1891 Sewanee Tigers football
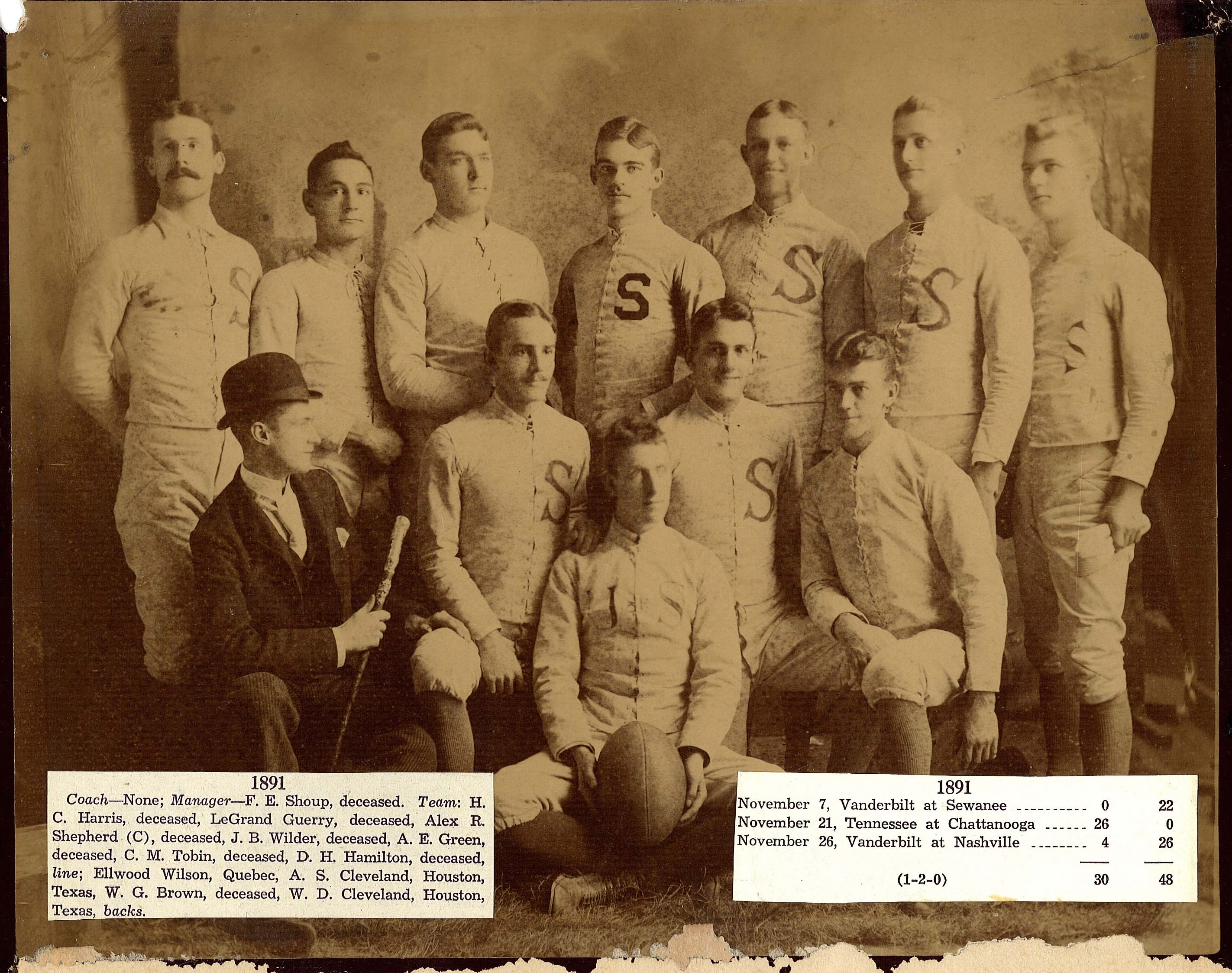
- Conference: Independent
- Record: 1–2
- Head coach: F. G. Sweat (1st season)
- Captain: Alex Shepherd
- Home stadium: Hardee Field

1891 Southern college football independents records
	Conf.			Overall
Team	W	L	T	W		L		T
Trinity (NC)		–		3	–	0	–	0
Wake Forest		–		1	–	0	–	0
VMI		–		3	–	0	–	1
Vanderbilt		–		3	–	1	–	0
Navy		–		5	–	2	–	0
Virginia		–		2	–	1	–	2
Delaware		–		5	–	3	–	1
Kentucky State College		–		1	–	1	–	0
Georgetown		–		2	–	2	–	0
Sewanee		–		1	–	2	–	0
Central (KY)		–		0	–	1	–	0
Furman		–		0	–	1	–	0
Tennessee		–		0	–	1	–	0
West Virginia		–		0	–	1	–	0
Johns Hopkins		–		0	–	2	–	0
North Carolina		–		0	–	2	–	0
Richmond		–		0	–	2	–	0

The 1891 Sewanee Tigers football team represented the Sewanee Tigers of Sewanee: The University of the South during the 1891 college football season. In the inaugural season of Sewanee football, the Tigers compiled a 1–2 record. The quarterback for the team's first game was Ellwood Wilson, considered the "founder of Sewanee football." He had come from the Lawrenceville School in Lawrenceville, New Jersey, where he played football, to Sewanee in 1889. While introducing the sport to Sewanee, he was forced to use a piece of wood shaped like a football until he found a real one. Alex Shepherd, a fellow Lawrenceville graduate and the son of Alexander Robey Shepherd, had more playing experience than Wilson and was selected to be the team's first captain.

Sewanee's first intercollegiate game was the first instance of the Sewanee–Vanderbilt rivalry and Vanderbilt's second ever game. The win over Tennessee was that program's first game.

== Schedule ==
Date	Opponent	Site	Result	Source
November 7	Vanderbilt	Hardee Field; Sewanee, TN (rivalry)	L 0–22	
November 21	at Tennessee	Chattanooga, TN	W 26–0	
November 26	at Vanderbilt	Athletic Park; Nashville, TN	L 4–26	
