= Stonewall Jackson Elementary School =

Stonewall Jackson Elementary School may refer to several schools in the United States:

- Stonewall Jackson Elementary School, Bristol, Virginia; see Bristol Virginia Public Schools
- Stonewall Jackson Elementary School, Plant City, Florida; see Hillsborough County Public Schools
- Mockingbird Elementary School (Dallas), Texas, formerly named Stonewall Jackson Elementary School

== See also ==
- Stonewall Jackson School (disambiguation)
