= Jackson College (disambiguation) =

Jackson College is a college in Jackson, Michigan.

Jackson College may also refer to:

- Jackson College for Women, Massachusetts, the coordinate college of Tufts University during the 1900s
- Jackson College (Tennessee), an 1800s institution burned during the American Civil War
- Jackson College, Hawaii, a predecessor of Hawai'i Pacific University
- Sheldon Jackson College, Alaska, active 1878–2007
- Jackson State University, Mississippi, formerly known as Jackson College and Jackson State College
- Jackson State Community College, Tennessee
- Jackson Junior College, a college for Negroes in Marianna, Florida, 1961–1965

== See also ==
- Jackson University (disambiguation)
- Jackson School (disambiguation)
