= 1891 Wake Forest Baptists football team =

American college football season

1891 Wake Forest Baptists football
- Conference: Independent
- Record: 1–0
- Head coach: E. Walter Sikes (1st season)
- Captain: Vernon Howell

1891 Southern college football independents records
	Conf.			Overall
Team	W	L	T	W		L		T
Trinity (NC)		–		3	–	0	–	0
Wake Forest		–		1	–	0	–	0
VMI		–		3	–	0	–	1
Vanderbilt		–		3	–	1	–	0
Navy		–		5	–	2	–	0
Virginia		–		2	–	1	–	2
Delaware		–		5	–	3	–	1
Kentucky State College		–		1	–	1	–	0
Georgetown		–		2	–	2	–	0
Sewanee		–		1	–	2	–	0
Central (KY)		–		0	–	1	–	0
Furman		–		0	–	1	–	0
Tennessee		–		0	–	1	–	0
West Virginia		–		0	–	1	–	0
Johns Hopkins		–		0	–	2	–	0
North Carolina		–		0	–	2	–	0
Richmond		–		0	–	2	–	0

The 1891 Wake Forest Baptists football team was an American football team that represented Wake Forest College during the 1891 college football season.

== Schedule ==
Date	Opponent	Site	Result	Source
November 10	North Carolina	Raleigh, NC (rivalry)	W forfeit	
