= H. P. Young =

American football player and coach

Biographical details
- Education: Brown (1887)

Playing career
- 1891: Furman
- Position: Quarterback

Coaching career (HC unless noted)
- 1891–1895: Furman

Head coaching record
- Overall: 2–4

H. P. Young was an American university professor and college football player and coach. He served as the head football coach at Furman University from 1891 to 1895, compiling a record of 2–4. Young an 1887 graduate of Brown University.

== Head coaching record ==
Year	Team	Overall	Conference	Standing	Bowl/playoffs
Furman Baptists (Independent) (1891–1995)
1891	Furman	0–1			
1892	Furman	1–0			
1893	Furman	1–1			
1894	No team				
1895	Furman	0–2			
Furman:		2–4			
Total:		2–4			
