= 1891 Tennessee Volunteers football team =

American college football season

1891 Tennessee Volunteers football
- Conference: Independent
- Record: 0–1
- Head coach: None

1891 Southern college football independents records
	Conf.			Overall
Team	W	L	T	W		L		T
Trinity (NC)		–		3	–	0	–	0
Wake Forest		–		1	–	0	–	0
VMI		–		3	–	0	–	1
Vanderbilt		–		3	–	1	–	0
Navy		–		5	–	2	–	0
Virginia		–		2	–	1	–	2
Delaware		–		5	–	3	–	1
Kentucky State College		–		1	–	1	–	0
Georgetown		–		2	–	2	–	0
Sewanee		–		1	–	2	–	0
Central (KY)		–		0	–	1	–	0
Furman		–		0	–	1	–	0
Tennessee		–		0	–	1	–	0
West Virginia		–		0	–	1	–	0
Johns Hopkins		–		0	–	2	–	0
North Carolina		–		0	–	2	–	0
Richmond		–		0	–	2	–	0

The 1891 Tennessee Volunteers football team represented the University of Tennessee in the 1891 season. This was the first Tennessee Volunteers football team. They traveled on Thanksgiving Day to Chattanooga, Tennessee to face Sewanee. They had no head coach and were mainly an intramural team.

== Schedule ==
Date	Time	Opponent	Site	Result	Source
November 21	2:00 p.m.	vs. Sewanee	Chattanooga, TN	L 0–24	
