= 1891 Georgetown football team =

American college football season

1891 Georgetown football
- Conference: Independent
- Record: 2–2
- Head coach: Tommy Dowd (1st season)
- Captain: Pat O'Donnell
- Home stadium: Boundary Field

1891 Southern college football independents records
	Conf.			Overall
Team	W	L	T	W		L		T
Trinity (NC)		–		3	–	0	–	0
Wake Forest		–		1	–	0	–	0
VMI		–		3	–	0	–	1
Vanderbilt		–		3	–	1	–	0
Navy		–		5	–	2	–	0
Virginia		–		2	–	1	–	2
Delaware		–		5	–	3	–	1
Kentucky State College		–		1	–	1	–	0
Georgetown		–		2	–	2	–	0
Sewanee		–		1	–	2	–	0
Central (KY)		–		0	–	1	–	0
Furman		–		0	–	1	–	0
Tennessee		–		0	–	1	–	0
West Virginia		–		0	–	1	–	0
Johns Hopkins		–		0	–	2	–	0
North Carolina		–		0	–	2	–	0
Richmond		–		0	–	2	–	0

The 1891 Georgetown football team represented the Georgetown University during the 1891 college football season. Georgetown finished the season with a 2–2 record. For the first time in their history, Georgetown had a coach, Tommy Dowd, who also played baseball for the Washington Senators. They played home games at Boundary Park, also the home venue for the Senators.

== Schedule ==
Date	Opponent	Site	Result	Attendance
October 27	at Gallaudet	Kendall Green; Washington, DC	W 24–0	
November 7	at Washington and Lee	Campus Field; Lexington, VA	W 30–10	
November 11	at Navy	Worden Field; Annapolis, MD	L 4–16	
November 26	Columbia Athletic Club	Boundary Field; Washington, DC	L 4–22	2,000
