= Jackson University =

Jackson University or variants may refer to:

- Andrew Jackson University, online university, California, USA
- Jackson State University, historically black university, Mississippi, USA
- Jackson University, fictional university from "The Hero" (1949), a novel by Millard Lampell, and "Saturday's Hero" (1951), its screen version by David Miller
- University School of Jackson, college prep school, Tennessee, USA
- Jackson School of International Studies

== See also ==
- Jackson College (disambiguation)
- Jackson School (disambiguation)
