= Jackson Academy =

Jackson Academy may refer to:

- Jackson Academy (Alabama), Jackson, Alabama
- Jackson Academy (Mississippi), Jackson, Mississippi
- Jackson Academy (Virginia), Newport News, Virginia

== See also ==
- Jackson School (disambiguation)
