= R. G. LeTourneau =

American inventor, philanthropist, and businessman (1888–1969)

Robert Gilmour LeTourneau
- Born: November 30, 1888; Richford, Vermont, U.S.
- Died: June 1, 1969 (aged 80); Longview, Texas, U.S.
- Occupations: Inventor; philanthropist; businessman
- Known for: Inventing earthmoving, other heavy machinery technology
- Spouse: Evelyn Peterson (m. 1917)
- Children: 5

Robert Gilmour LeTourneau (/lətˈərnoʊ/; November 30, 1888 – June 1, 1969) was an American inventor, businessman, and philanthropist known for the development and manufacture of earthmoving equipment. He began working as a land-leveling contractor in 1920, established an engineering workshop the following year, and incorporated R. G. LeTourneau, Inc. in 1929. In 1933, he left contracting to concentrate on manufacturing earthmoving machinery.

LeTourneau developed or helped introduce several important technologies for earthmoving machinery, including scraper equipment operated by a single power-control unit, large low-pressure rubber tires, electric motors mounted at the driving wheels, and the two-wheeled Tournapull tractor unit. In 1953, he sold his earthmoving equipment line, including its plants and machinery, to the Westinghouse Air Brake Company for $31 million.

A devout Christian, LeTourneau gave much of his wealth and time to religious and educational causes. He and his wife, Evelyn, established the institution that became LeTourneau University in Longview, Texas, beginning with the LeTourneau Technical Institute in 1946. He also supported other Christian organizations and gave 90 percent of his salary and company profits to religious donations.

== Early life and education ==
Robert Gilmour LeTourneau, known as "R.G." to friends, was born on November 30, 1888, to a farming family living in Richford, Vermont. He moved with them to Duluth, Minnesota, and then to Portland, Oregon, where he attended school through high school, dropping out at the age of 14 to take on an apprenticeship as an ironworker, at the East Portland Iron Works.

There he learned the foundry and machinist trades, and, at the same time, did correspondence study of the "basics of mechanical engineering", although he never completed any course assignments in those International Correspondence Schools courses. LeTourneau then began his working life in a variety of jobs that taught him "valuable technical skills".

== Career ==
=== Early career ===
LeTourneau eventually moved to San Francisco, where he worked at the Moore and Scott Iron Works at the personal invitation of the owner. After the San Francisco earthquake and fire, work was hard to come by. As described in a 2007 LaTourneau company biography (after his passing, when the company was under ownership by Rowan Companies), before 1909

he was employed at the Yerba Buena Power Plant and learned welding skills and became familiar with the application of electricity. In 1909, he moved to Stockton, California. During this time, LeTourneau worked at a number of jobs including wood cutter, farm hand, miner and carpenter's laborer, acquiring a sound knowledge of the manual trades that would prove invaluable in later life.

In 1909 he took an automobile correspondence course granting himself a "Bachelor of Motorcycles" as he learned about vehicle mechanics and graduated by taking apart and putting back together his newly acquired motorcycle in a day. After working on a project to build a bridge across the Stanislaus River, and seeing first hand the Fresno scraper, he was anxious to put to use his mechanical skills.

As described in the 2007 company biography, "[i]n 1911, LeTourneau was employed at the Superior Garage in Stockton, California, where he learned about vehicle mechanics and later became half-owner of the business." His stake was $1,000, and the building may have been the first in that section of California designed exclusively for the sales and servicing of cars.

LeTourneau was further described in the 2007 company biography:

Refused military service because of permanent neck injuries sustained in a car racing accident, LeTourneau worked during World War I as a maintenance assistant at the Mare Island Navy Yard in California, where he was trained as an electrical machinist and improved his welding skills. After the war, LeTourneau returned to Stockton and discovered the Superior Garage business had failed. In order to repay his portion of the debts, he took a job repairing a Holt crawler tractor, and was then employed by the tractor owner to level 40 acres [160,000 m^{2}] using the tractor and a towed scraper.

=== Move into manufacturing ===
As also described in the company biography:

This type of work appealed to LeTourneau and in January of 1920, he purchased a used Holt tractor and, with a hired scraper, commenced business as a land leveling contractor. In May of 1921, he purchased a plot of land in Stockton, California, and established a small engineering workshop, where he designed and built several types of scrapers. Combining contracting and earthmoving equipment manufacturing, his business soon began to expand and, in 1929, ...were incorporated in California as R. G. LeTourneau, Inc.

Continuing, the biography states,

Letourneau completed many earthmoving projects during the 1920's and early 1930's, including the Boulder Highway to Hoover Dam in Nevada, the Marysville Levees, Orange County Dam and the Newhall Cut-off in California. In 1933, LeTourneau retired from contracting to devote his attention to the manufacturing of earthmoving equipment. In 1935, he built a manufacturing plant in Peoria, Illinois, and the continued expansion of his business saw the establishment of manufacturing plants in Toccoa, Georgia in 1938; Rydalmere, Australia in 1941; Vicksburg, Mississippi in 1942, and Longview, Texas in 1945.

=== Later career ===
In 1953, LeTourneau sold his entire earth-moving equipment line—including plants, land, machinery, and inventory—to the Westinghouse Air Brake Company for US$ 31 million. In 1958, at the age of seventy, LeTourneau re-entered the earthmoving equipment manufacturing business, offering contractors a range of high capacity earthmoving, transportation, and material handling machines. These were based on his recently developed electric wheel drive (wheel hub motor).

In 1966, at age 77, LeTourneau handed over leadership of the work and assets of the remaining company, LeTourneau Technologies, to his son, Richard LeTourneau. After 1966, LeTourneau continued to work each day and could be found at the drawing board in his modest office, designing new ways to move larger loads faster and more economically.

LeTourneau Technologies was sold to Marathon Manufacturing Company in 1972, becoming Marathon LeTourneau Company, which was in turn acquired by Rowan in 1986, and Joy Global in 2011, the last of which was acquired by and renamed to Komatsu Mining Corp. That company's assets—electric wheel and oil rig technologies—became and remain divided between various manufacturing and rig-technology companies.

== Contributions ==
R. G. LeTourneau was largely responsible for the invention and development of many types of earthmoving machines manufactured by his company and now widely used. He is credited with:

- introduction of land scraper equipment with a single person-operated power control unit, allowing it, in combination, to load, haul, dump, and spread earth;
- replacing earlier-used "wide steel wheels" that "cut into sandy soil", with large rubber truck tires, and the development of low-pressure, heavy-duty rubber tires;
- placing diesel-generator powered electric motors (akin to diesel-electric locomotives) on each driving wheel of his scrapers;
- developing the two-wheeled "Tournapull" tractor unit, and numerous other improvements relating to scrapers;
- as well as the concepts related to and used in mobile offshore drilling platforms.

=== Outside of business ===
Several of R.G.'s original machines are on display on the LeTourneau University campus.

With the help of his wife, the late Evelyn Peterson (1900-1987), he founded LeTourneau University, a private, Christian institution, in Longview, Texas. LeTourneau was widely known as a devout Christian and generous philanthropist to Christian causes, including the "LeTourneau Christian Center" camp and conference grounds in Rushville, New York, and Georgia Baptist Conference Center in Toccoa, Georgia.

== Personal pursuits ==
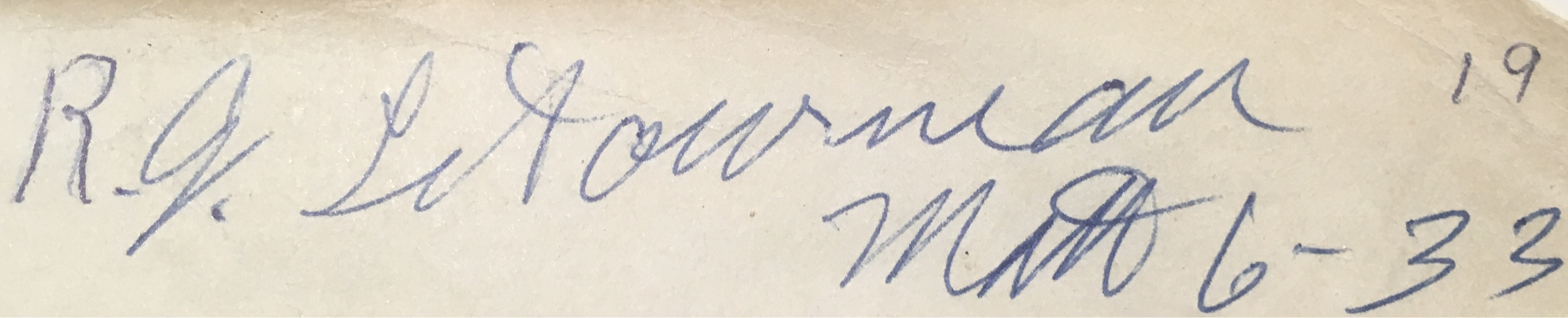
Signature of R. G. Letourneau, citing Matthew 6:33, a Bible verse that was foundational to his life

As described in his 2007 company biography, "[i]n 1917, [R.G.] married Evelyn Peterson, the daughter of a draying company owner from Minnesota."

In 1965, International Correspondence Schools awarded LeTourneau his diploma in engineering, 50 years after he studied from their course materials. LeTourneau was 76 at the time and, in accepting the diploma, jovially remarked to executive assistant, Nels Stjernstrom: "So now I've got a diploma. Now I'm educated."

LeTourneau held many respected positions throughout his life as a Christian layman, including as a leader in the Christian & Missionary Alliance Church, of Christian Business Men's Connection International, (CBMC, then the Christian Business Men's Committee International), and of the Gideons International. For 30 years he flew thousands of miles each week to maintain Christian speaking engagements around the United States and overseas.

LeTourneau set aside 90 percent of his salary and company profits for religious donations, living on the other 10 percent. He once stated that "I shovel out the money, and God shovels it back – but God has a bigger shovel". "You have made the word of God a glorious, practical reality," radio program host Robert Ripley told LeTourneau, then turned to the audience with his own trademark flourish. "And of such is the work of faith...believe it or not."

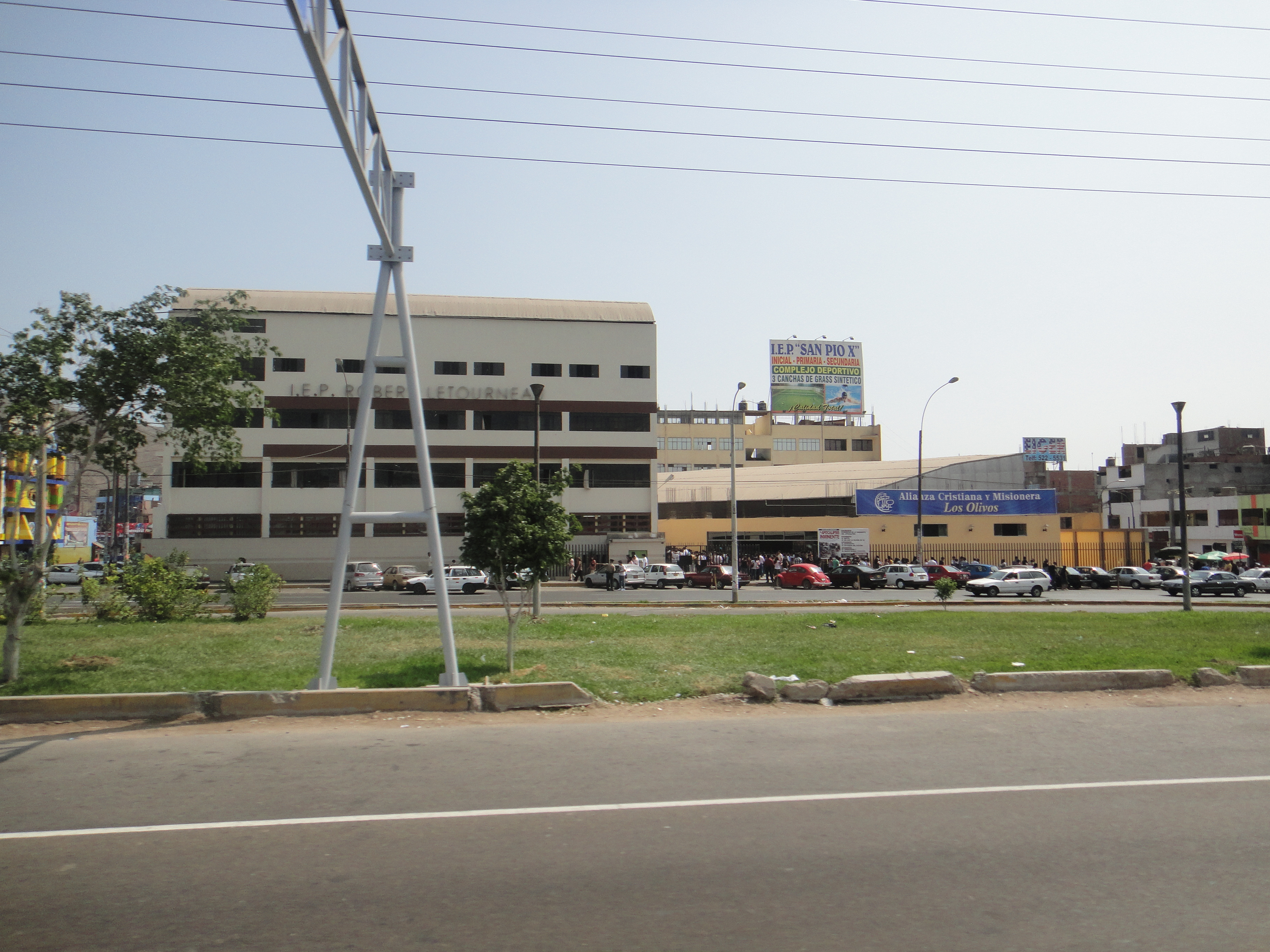
Robert Letourneau School in Los Olivos District, Lima, Peru

LeTourneau was a firm believer in the effectiveness of practical instruction combined with classroom studies; and, in 1946, he purchased an unused military hospital, accompanying land and buildings in Longview. There he established the LeTourneau Technical Institute at the site of the former Harmon General Hospital to provide sound technical and mechanical training, traditional college courses, and training for missionary technicians, based on the philosophy of combining work, education, and Christian testimony. The LeTourneau Technical Institute became a college in its own right, in 1961, and eventually gained "university" status to become LeTourneau University.

In 1953, LeTourneau began a development project in the country of Liberia, West Africa, with the diverse goals of colonization, land development, agricultural development, livestock introduction, evangelism and philanthropic activities. In 1954, a colonization project with similar objectives to those in Liberia was established in the country of Peru, South America. The project in Peru was called "Tournavista".

== Death ==
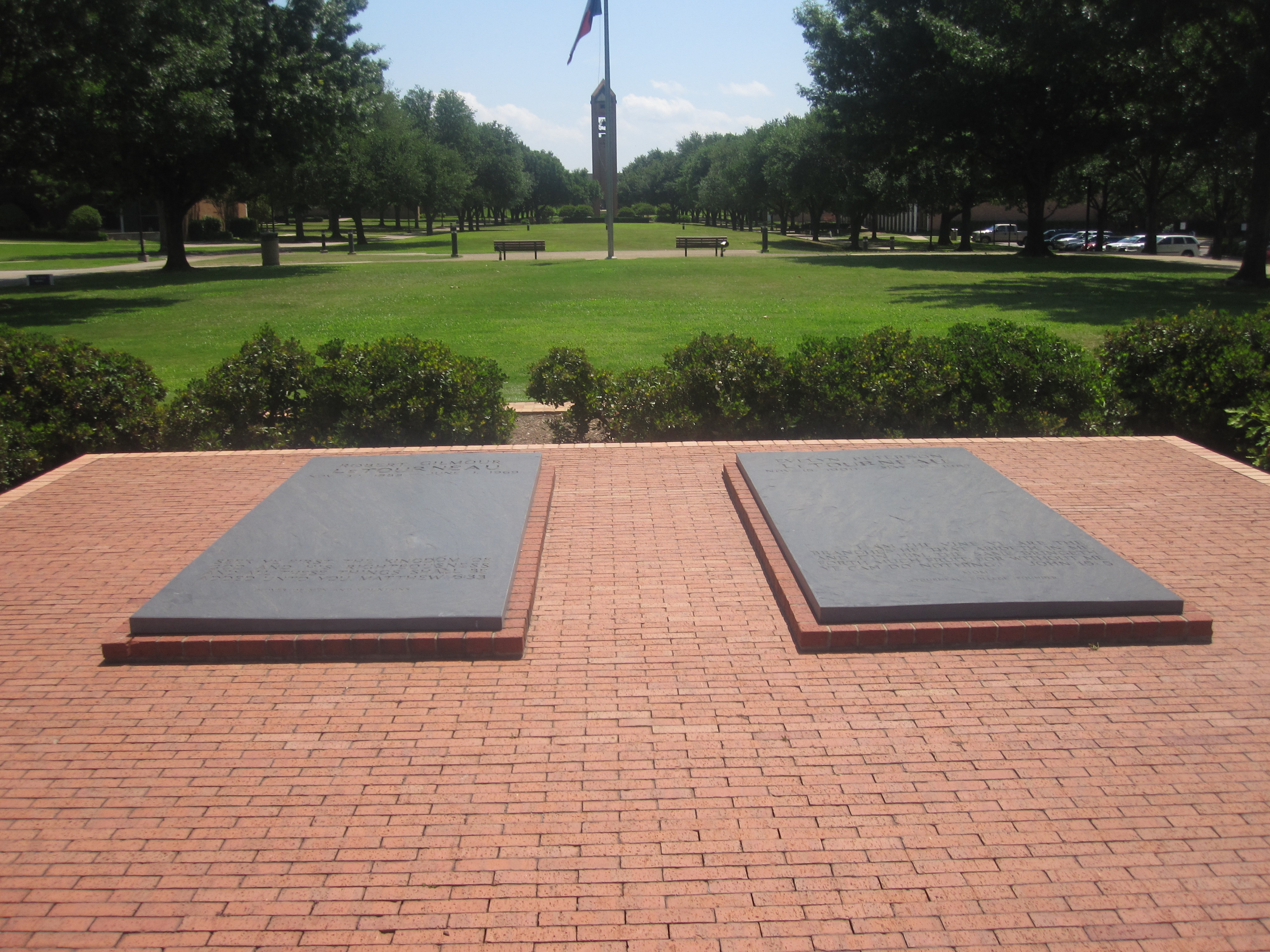
Graves of R.G. and Evelyn Peterson LeTourneau on the LeTourneau University campus in Longview, Texas

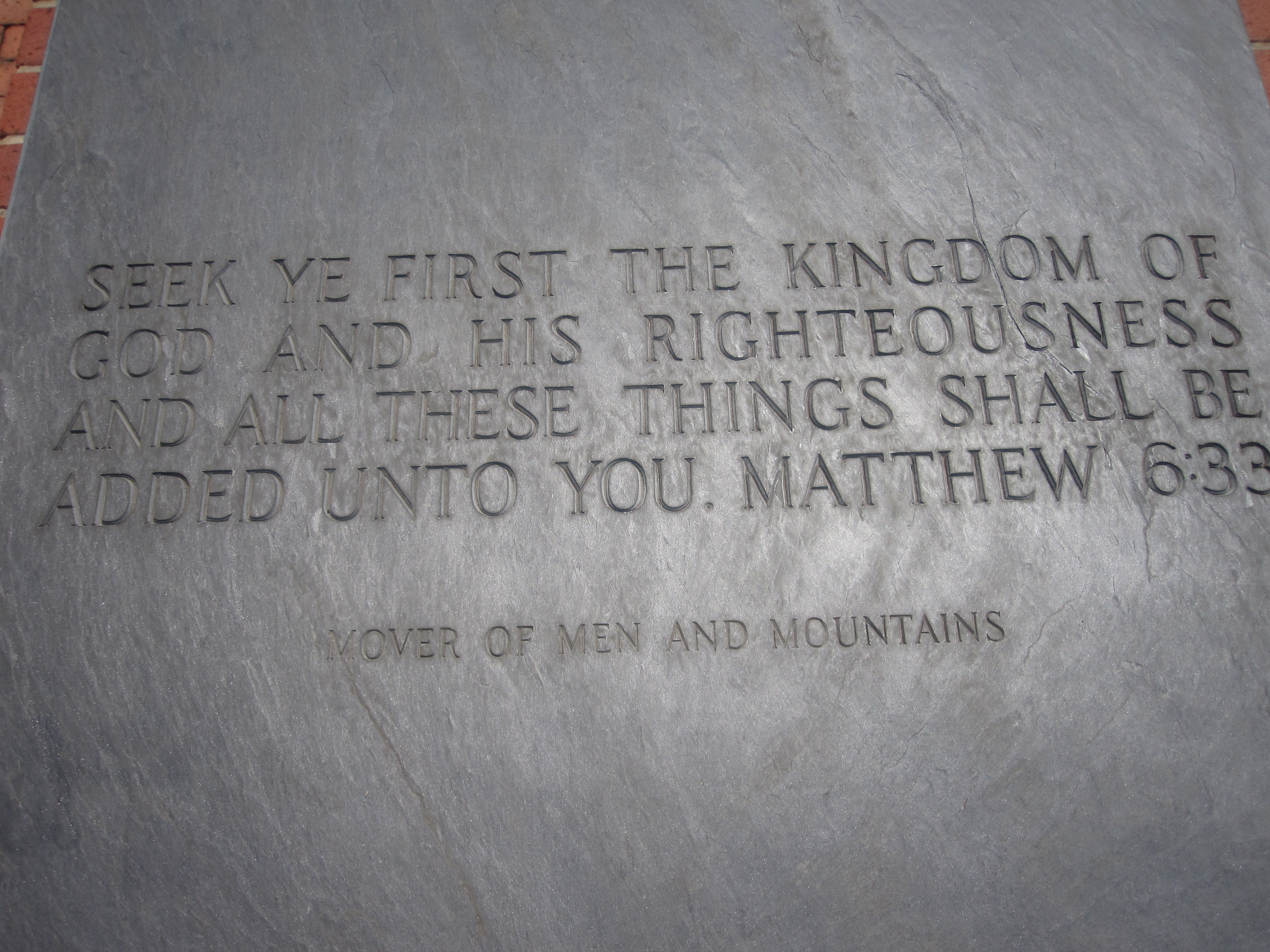
Matthew 6:33, inscribed at the foot of R.G. LeTourneau's grave

In March 1969, LeTourneau suffered a severe stroke from which he never recovered. He died on June 1, 1969, at the age of eighty. He was survived by his wife, Evelyn, and five children: four sons (Richard, Roy, Ted, and Ben), and a daughter, Louise Dick.

== Awards, recognition, and legacy ==
Known throughout the construction world as, "The Dean of Earthmoving," LeTourneau is considered to this day to have been the world's greatest inventor of earthmoving and materials handling equipment. Few manufacturers of that era had such a profound effect upon the art of earthmoving as did LeTourneau. Just two years prior to his death, LeTourneau recorded his thoughts about the future of earthmoving equipment:

Construction machinery will grow bigger and bigger, and more and more powerful. Instead of 'tons' of capacity, they'll be in 'hundreds of tons', and instead of hundreds of horsepower, they'll all be rated in 'thousands of horsepower' ... We're already seeing it in big hauling units in the mines, and believe me, when the contractor and mining companies start looking for bigger and more profitable hauling units and earthmoving equipment, I'm going to be right there, the firstest with the mostest.

LeTourneau was active in his company as president and chairman of the board from 1929 until 1966. He also held the position of chief engineer, personally working alongside his engineers and employees throughout his working life. Having spent his entire life around earthmoving equipment, LeTourneau, by description of those close to him, was just as likely to be seen at the controls of one of his machines as attending to corporate matters; he preferred the former. LeTourneau, as described by the peers at the university he founded, shunned the high life and preferred to spend his time at the drawing board with the engineers designing new machinery or spending time on the factory floor overseeing his employees.

LeTourneau Hall at Toccoa Falls College was named in his honor. Toccoa Airport, also known as R. G. LeTourneau Field, was built by LeTourneau and named in his honor.

Throughout his career, he was the recipient of more than 30 awards and honors related to engineering, manufacturing, and the development of heavy equipment. In 1936, he was presented with the "Appreciation of Service Achievement 1931-1935," by Six Companies Incorporated for supplying earthmoving equipment to the "Boulder Dam" project. He was awarded the Frank P. Brown Medal in 1956. Recognition of service to the earthmoving industry later came from many other contractors in the industry, and, in February 1958, LeTourneau was presented with the "Beavers Award" by the Beavers, an association of leaders in the heavy construction industry. In presenting the award to LeTourneau, Beavers president George H. Atkinson, of the Guy F. Atkinson Company, a San Francisco contractor, said, "There is hardly any place in the vast industry that has not benefited through the products of Mr. LeTourneau's inventive genius."

== See also ==
- LeTourneau University
