= 1891 West Virginia Mountaineers football team =

American college football season

1891 West Virginia Mountaineers football
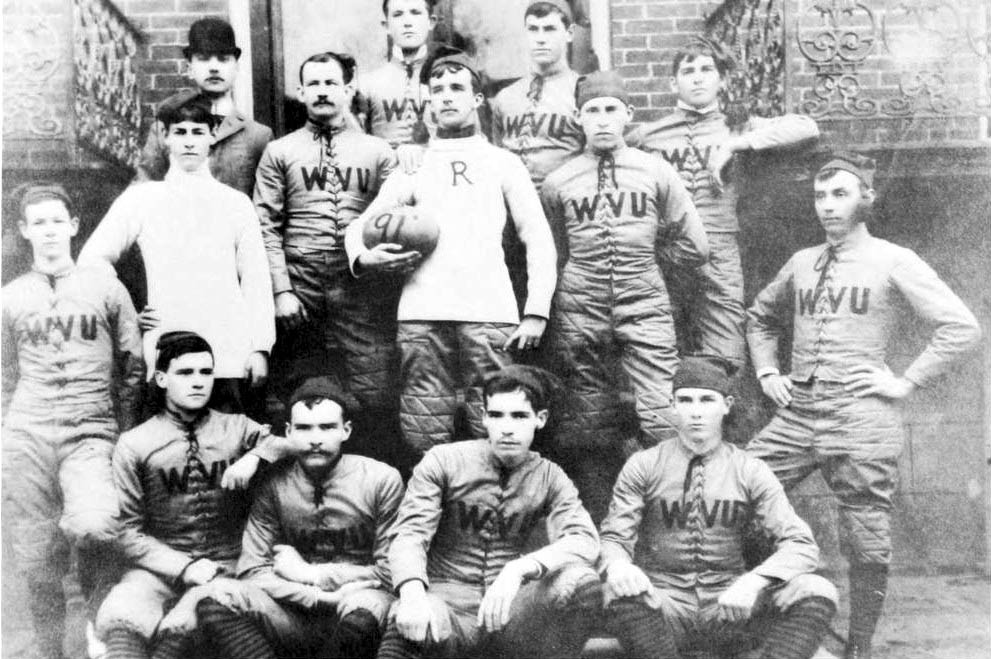
- Conference: Independent
- Record: 0–1
- Head coach: Frederick Lincoln Emory (1st season)
- Captain: Robert F. Bivens
- Home stadium: Show Lot

1891 Southern college football independents records
	Conf.			Overall
Team	W	L	T	W		L		T
Trinity (NC)		–		3	–	0	–	0
Wake Forest		–		1	–	0	–	0
VMI		–		3	–	0	–	1
Vanderbilt		–		3	–	1	–	0
Navy		–		5	–	2	–	0
Virginia		–		2	–	1	–	2
Delaware		–		5	–	3	–	1
Kentucky State College		–		1	–	1	–	0
Georgetown		–		2	–	2	–	0
Sewanee		–		1	–	2	–	0
Central (KY)		–		0	–	1	–	0
Furman		–		0	–	1	–	0
Tennessee		–		0	–	1	–	0
West Virginia		–		0	–	1	–	0
Johns Hopkins		–		0	–	2	–	0
North Carolina		–		0	–	2	–	0
Richmond		–		0	–	2	–	0

The 1891 West Virginia Mountaineers football team represented West Virginia University in the 1891 college football season. Led by Frederick Lincoln Emory in his first and only year as the Mountaineers' head coach, this was the first West Virginia Mountaineers football team. They lost the only game they played Washington & Jefferson, 72–0, at the Show Lot in Morgantown, West Virginia.

== Schedule ==
Date	Opponent	Site	Result	Attendance	Source
November 28	Washington & Jefferson	Show Lot; Morgantown, WV	L 0–72	250	

== Players ==
The inaugural 1891 roster featured fourteen lettermen.

- Robert F. Bivens, Washington, D.C. – Back
- N. B. Blake, Cox Landing, West Virginia – Guard
- Alpheus Edward Boyd, Uniontown, Pennsylvania – End
- George M. Ford, Masontown, West Virginia – Center
- John "Butch" Hackney, Morgantown, West Virginia
- Gory Hogg, Sewell Station, West Virginia – Quarterback
- John Thomas Holbert, Watson, West Virginia
- Edward Hortman, Tunnelton, West Virginia
- John W. Hughes, Troy, West Virginia – Guard
- Samuel Jenkins, Grafton, West Virginia – Tackle
- George H. A. Kunst, Pruntytown, West Virginia – Guard
- Andrew Price, Marlinton, West Virginia – Tackle
- Andrew Brown Smith, Uniontown, Pennsylvania – End
- William G. Swaney, New Cumberland, West Virginia
