= 1891 North Carolina Tar Heels football team =

American college football season

1891 North Carolina Tar Heels football
- Conference: North Carolina Inter-Collegiate Football Association
- Record: 0–2 (0-2 NCIFA)
- Head coach: None
- Captains: Michael Hoke; George Graham
- Home stadium: Campus Athletic Field (I)

1891 Southern college football independents records
	Conf.			Overall
Team	W	L	T	W		L		T
Trinity (NC)		–		3	–	0	–	0
Wake Forest		–		1	–	0	–	0
VMI		–		3	–	0	–	1
Vanderbilt		–		3	–	1	–	0
Navy		–		5	–	2	–	0
Virginia		–		2	–	1	–	2
Delaware		–		5	–	3	–	1
Kentucky State College		–		1	–	1	–	0
Georgetown		–		2	–	2	–	0
Sewanee		–		1	–	2	–	0
Central (KY)		–		0	–	1	–	0
Furman		–		0	–	1	–	0
Tennessee		–		0	–	1	–	0
West Virginia		–		0	–	1	–	0
Johns Hopkins		–		0	–	2	–	0
North Carolina		–		0	–	2	–	0
Richmond		–		0	–	2	–	0

The 1891 North Carolina Tar Heels football team represented the University of North Carolina in the 1891 college football season. They played two games with a final record of 0–2. There had been no football team since 1889 prior to this season. The team captains for the 1891 season were Michael Hoke and George Graham. William P. Graves has been reported as this team's coach, but he was the coach in the spring of 1891 when UNC was scheduled to play, but did not. UNC was leading in its contest with Wake Forest but forfeited before the game was over.

== Schedule ==
Date	Time	Opponent	Site	Result	Attendance	Source
November 10	3:05 p.m.	vs. Wake Forest	Athletic Park; Raleigh, NC (rivalry)	L (by forfeit)	500	
November 20	4:15 p.m.	Trinity (NC)	Campus Athletic Field (I); Chapel Hill, NC (rivalry)	L 4–6	300	
