= 1891 Richmond Colts football team =

American college football season

1891 Richmond Colts football
- Conference: Independent
- Record: 0–2
- Head coach: Dana Rucker (1st season)
- Captain: Frank W. Duke
- Home stadium: Island Park

1891 Southern college football independents records
	Conf.			Overall
Team	W	L	T	W		L		T
Trinity (NC)		–		3	–	0	–	0
Wake Forest		–		1	–	0	–	0
VMI		–		3	–	0	–	1
Vanderbilt		–		3	–	1	–	0
Navy		–		5	–	2	–	0
Virginia		–		2	–	1	–	2
Delaware		–		5	–	3	–	1
Kentucky State College		–		1	–	1	–	0
Georgetown		–		2	–	2	–	0
Sewanee		–		1	–	2	–	0
Central (KY)		–		0	–	1	–	0
Furman		–		0	–	1	–	0
Tennessee		–		0	–	1	–	0
West Virginia		–		0	–	1	–	0
Johns Hopkins		–		0	–	2	–	0
North Carolina		–		0	–	2	–	0
Richmond		–		0	–	2	–	0

The 1891 Richmond Colts football team was an American football team that represented Richmond College—now known as the University of Richmond—as an independent during the 1891 college football season. The team went winless and was coached by Dana Rucker.

== Schedule ==
Date	Opponent	Site	Result	Attendance	Source
November 9	Randolph–Macon	Island Park; Richmond, VA	L 4–12	250	
November 23	Keswick School	Island Park; Richmond, VA	L 4–12	150	
