= 1891 Vanderbilt Commodores football team =

American college football season

1891 Vanderbilt Commodores football
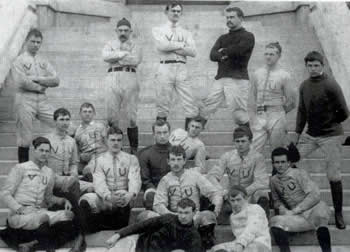
- Conference: Independent
- Record: 3–1
- Head coach: Elliott Jones (2nd season)
- Captain: Elliott Jones

1891 Southern college football independents records
	Conf.			Overall
Team	W	L	T	W		L		T
Trinity (NC)		–		3	–	0	–	0
Wake Forest		–		1	–	0	–	0
VMI		–		3	–	0	–	1
Vanderbilt		–		3	–	1	–	0
Navy		–		5	–	2	–	0
Virginia		–		2	–	1	–	2
Delaware		–		5	–	3	–	1
Kentucky State College		–		1	–	1	–	0
Georgetown		–		2	–	2	–	0
Sewanee		–		1	–	2	–	0
Central (KY)		–		0	–	1	–	0
Furman		–		0	–	1	–	0
Tennessee		–		0	–	1	–	0
West Virginia		–		0	–	1	–	0
Johns Hopkins		–		0	–	2	–	0
North Carolina		–		0	–	2	–	0
Richmond		–		0	–	2	–	0

The 1891 Vanderbilt Commodores football team represented Vanderbilt University during the 1891 college football season. The team's head coach and team captain was Elliott H. Jones, who served his second season in that capacity. This was the first year that Vanderbilt had a schedule of opponents other than the school next door to them. Vanderbilt and Sewanee, charter members of the Southern Intercollegiate Conference, play their first game. The rivalry, typically reserved for Thanksgiving Day, continues into World War II. When the series ended in 1944, Vanderbilt owned a 40–8–4 advantage.

Vanderbilt opened the short season with a 22–0 win over Sewanee, followed by its first-ever loss, 6–24 to Washington University. After defeating Sewanee 26–4 in a rematch, the Commodores won their rematch at St. Louis against Washington 4–0.

The 1891 Vanderbilt team had five games scheduled; however, the fourth was Centre College of Danville, KY.The game was set for November 21, 1891, at Nashville’s Athletic Park (later known as Sulphur Dell), and at 3 p.m. Vanderbilt called the game due to excessive rain. The Centre team’s hotel bill and the game advertising was for paid by Vanderbilt. The university also paid $45.00 in cash to help pay for their return train fare.

== Schedule ==
Date	Opponent	Site	Result	Source
November 7	at Sewanee	Hardee Field; Sewanee, TN (rivalry)	W 22–0	
November 14	Washington University	Nashville's Athletic Park; Nashville, TN	L 6–24	
November 21	Centre	Nashville's Athletic Park; Nashville, TN	Canceled	
November 26	Sewanee	Nashville's Athletic Park; Nashville, TN	W 26–4	
December 5	at Washington University	Sportsman's Park; St. Louis, MO	W 4–0	
