= 1891 Navy Midshipmen football team =

American college football season

1891 Navy Midshipmen football
- Conference: Independent
- Record: 5–2
- Head coach: None
- Captain: Charles Macklin
- Home stadium: Worden Field

1891 Southern college football independents records
	Conf.			Overall
Team	W	L	T	W		L		T
Trinity (NC)		–		3	–	0	–	0
Wake Forest		–		1	–	0	–	0
VMI		–		3	–	0	–	1
Vanderbilt		–		3	–	1	–	0
Navy		–		5	–	2	–	0
Virginia		–		2	–	1	–	2
Delaware		–		5	–	3	–	1
Kentucky State College		–		1	–	1	–	0
Georgetown		–		2	–	2	–	0
Sewanee		–		1	–	2	–	0
Central (KY)		–		0	–	1	–	0
Furman		–		0	–	1	–	0
Tennessee		–		0	–	1	–	0
West Virginia		–		0	–	1	–	0
Johns Hopkins		–		0	–	2	–	0
North Carolina		–		0	–	2	–	0
Richmond		–		0	–	2	–	0

The 1891 Navy Midshipmen football team represented the United States Naval Academy during the 1891 college football season. The team compiled a 5–2 record and outscored its opponents 205 to 40. In the second installment of the Army–Navy Game, Army prevailed by a 32–16 score. Charles Macklin was the team captain in 1891.

== Schedule ==
Date	Opponent	Site	Result
October 24	St. John's (MD)	Worden Field; Annapolis, MD	W 28–6
October 31	Rutgers	Worden Field; Annapolis, MD	W 21–12
November 7	Gallaudet	Worden Field; Annapolis, MD	W 6–0
November 11	Georgetown	Worden Field; Annapolis, MD	W 16–4
November 14	Dickinson	Worden Field; Annapolis, MD	W 34–4
November 21	Lafayette	Worden Field; Annapolis, MD	L 0–4
November 28	Army	Worden Field; Annapolis, MD (Army–Navy Game)	L 16–32
