= Timothy N. Philpot =

American lawyer, author and judge (born 1951)

Tim Philpot

Judge of the 22nd Kentucky Circuit Court
- In office January 27, 2004 – 2018
- Preceded by: Laurance B. VanMeter
- Succeeded by: Libby Messer

Member of the Kentucky Senate from the 12th district
- In office January 1, 1991 – January 1, 1999
- Preceded by: Jack Trevey
- Succeeded by: Alice Forgy Kerr

Personal details
- Born: March 18, 1951
- Party: Republican

Timothy Neil Philpot (Tim Philpot, born March 18, 1951) is an American lawyer, author and judge. He was elected to serve as a family court circuit judge in Fayette County, Kentucky in 2004, and again in 2006 and 2014, in the latter case with a term expiring in January 2023. He previously served as a Republican member of the Kentucky Senate from 1993 to 1998 and as the president of Christian Business Men's Connection from 1996 to 2003. As a judge, Philpot has been criticized for writing opinion pieces on the law surrounding same-sex marriage but has also been defended as not being someone to allow his social views to influence his judicial decisions. Philpot is an author of a semi-autobiographical novel drawing on cases he has heard and his experiences as a judge, explored from his socially conservative Methodist perspective.

== Early life ==
Timothy Niel Philpot was born March 18, 1951, the son of Ford and Virginia Philpot, is a lifelong resident of Lexington, Kentucky. His father was a minister in the United Methodist Church and the producer of The Story, the first religious television program broadcast in color. Philpot received his Bachelor of Science degree in history in 1974 and his Juris Doctor in 1977, both from the University of Kentucky.

== Career ==
=== Trial law ===
Philpot worked as a trial lawyer for more than 26 years. He specialized in employment law, family law and civil rights cases; in 1989, he won Fayette County's first million dollar verdict.

=== Politics ===
Philpot served as a Republican Party State Senator for Fayette, Kentucky, from January 1991 to December 1998. The Lexington Herald Leader, while frequently disagreeing with Philpot's positions, described him as "one of the ten best" legislators in 1992, writing that "there should be room on the list for 'a man with a conscience.'" On issues of ethics, the paper called him "a lone voice crying in the wilderness." Philpot is staunchly conservative in social policy areas, described at times as "crazy" by opponents and regularly "the subject of editorial cartoons for his stances against abortion and pornography and his sermons on the floor of the General Assembly." In 2012, Philpot admitted to disappointment at no longer being a radical: "No one calls me 'crazy' anymore ... I have never been arrested. I am now a respected member of the community."

=== Judiciary ===
In the November 2003 elections, Pilpot ran for the position of circuit judge in the fourth division of the Kentucky Circuit Courts, losing to Pamela R. Goodwine 53% to 47%. Governor Ernie Fletcher appointed him to a family court position in the Kentucky first division from January 2004; he retained this position in the 2004 elections, defeating J. "Ross" Stinetorf 56% to 44%. Philpot was re-elected unopposed in 2006, and again in 2014. Under section 116 of the Constitution of Kentucky, circuit justices terms begin on the first Monday in January following their election and run for eight years; consequently, Philpot's elected term will end on Sunday, January 1, 2023.

== Controversies ==
A controversy arose in relation to funding for Philpot's 2004 re-election bid. Philpot accepted a donation of $1,000 from an attorney who was before him in a divorce case; the donor had also planned to host a fundraiser at his home. Kentucky law places no restrictions on donations to judicial election campaigns from attorneys, but questions of bias arose and the issue ended up before the Kentucky Supreme Court after Philpot declined to recuse himself from the case. The Court ruled there was insufficient evidence of bias, and Philpot declared that the funding system may need to change but that it's not "fair to make me the poster boy for a bad system."

Philpot has expressed controversial views on LGBT issues, including as an outspoken critic of the legalization of same-sex marriage. Following the 2013 decisions in Hollingsworth v. Perry (which had the effect of legalizing same-sex marriage in California by upholding the overturning of Proposition 8) and United States v. Windsor (which invalidated parts of the Defense of Marriage Act and forced the U.S. federal government to recognize same-sex marriages that were legal under state law), Philpot wrote an opinion editorial explaining that Kentucky state law was unaffected by the decisions. Philpot's conclusion was that "Kentucky's constitution defines marriage as one man and one woman. Simple and traditional. Kentucky's definition of marriage stands – for now." This was criticized heavily on two grounds. Then-retired Chief Judge of the United States District Court for the Eastern District of Kentucky Jennifer Coffman, who was Kentucky's first female federal judge, wrote a highly critical opinion editorial responding to Philpot. She noted that "Philpot took several risks, not the least of which is that he could be wrong" as the "DOMA ruling's effect in Kentucky rests with the courts which consider the matter" (i.e. Federal Courts), though subsequent events have rendered this moot. Further, "the possibility that a case involving these issues could arise in Philpot's court underscores the primary error of his column: he has undermined his own judicial integrity. If squarely presented with the issue of the DOMA ruling's effect in Kentucky, he might have to disqualify himself from the case because he has stated his opinion on that topic." Coffman also criticized Philpot for dismissing principles of judicial interpretation as "boring and technical" and for ridiculing judicial review with his observation that then-Chief Judge Vaughn Walker's declaration in the first instance that Proposition 8 was unconstitutional was: "One trial judge trumped every voter in California"–and for gratuitously mentioning Walker's sexuality. Coffman concluded that "Philpot might have foreclosed his ability to sit on any case involving gay marriage because his comments raise a question of bias on the topic of sexual orientation."

Philpot made further controversial comments after the 2015 decision in Obergefell v. Hodges, legalizing gay marriage throughout the United States. Philpot described gay marriage as an oxymoron, the Supreme Court's decision as "pretty close to insane," and described homosexual relationships as "sterile" and "just entertainment." He also described homosexuality as a choice, saying that children now have "got to decide which gender to date"; this matches his previously expressed views that the gay lifestyle is a "destructive lifestyle" and that it is a "behavior, it's not genetic." LGBT rights advocates challenged these views as showing a "fundamental misunderstanding of what it means to be LGBT" and as evidence of a "deep disrespect for LGBT people and their families." Judges have a First Amendment right to express their views so long as they do not influence their decisions. Philpot has presided over many cases with LGBT people and lawyers who have been involved report that he does not base his decisions on a litigant's sexuality. Speaking of his religious views, Philpot has stated that "I don't mention Jesus inside the courthouse very much, even when I know he is absolutely the only answer to the problem in front of me." Philpot has also stated that "half the adoptions I do are for gay people. And they're not bad people," and that he loves homosexuals. Philpot regrets, however, that friendships between straight men are affected as they are unable to hug in the way they used to, and that the rainbow, a symbol from the Bible, had been "stolen" – and he plans to put a rainbow on the back of his car.

== Writing ==
As a family court judge, Philpot has presided over a considerable number of cases involving relationship breakdown, which often end in a divorce on the grounds of a marriage being "irretrievably broken." Believing that many of these marriages were salvageable, Philpot has written a novel, Judge Z: Irretrievably Broken, which he describes as "a fictional account about the death of marriage in the American culture ... [t]he book is both autobiographical and pedagogical." The plot borrows heavily from cases which Philpot has heard, and is described as engaging and well-written whilst reflecting Philpot's socially conservative Methodist perspective. Like in his previous book, the autobiographical aspects of the book are evident: the central character is a family court judge in Kentucky, loves playing golf (Philpot was a skilled amateur golfer), and has a father who overcame a drinking issue with the help and support of his wife (just as did Philpot's parents). His view of himself is also reflected in the name of the judge in the novel, Zenas; Zenas being one of disciples of Jesus and the only lawyer named in the Bible. The pedagogical aspect is the exploration of whether some marriages are truly irretrievably broken, exploring the social consequences of single parent families and unstable environments for children and explores marriage from a Christian perspective, seeing marriage as "the Biblical analogy for God's love."

=== Publications ===
- Ford's Wonderful World of Golf (2013) – described by Philpot as "a tribute and memoir to his evangelist father, Ford Philpot, whose passion for golf was only exceeded by his love for proclaiming the Gospel of Jesus Christ."
- Judge Z: Irretrievably Broken (2016)

== Other activities ==
Philpot joined the Christian Business Men's Connection (CBMC), an international evangelical Christian organization with the mission to "evangelize and disciple business and professional men for Christ" in 1978. He served as the president of CBMC International from July 1996 to September 2003.

== Personal life ==
In 1971, Philpot married Susan Davis, who was raised in the Democratic Republic of the Congo in Africa, the daughter of missionaries from the Methodist church, a nurse.
