= 1891 Furman Baptists football team =

American college football season

1891 Furman Baptists football
- Conference: Independent
- Record: 0–1
- Head coach: H. P. Young (1st season)

1891 Southern college football independents records
	Conf.			Overall
Team	W	L	T	W		L		T
Trinity (NC)		–		3	–	0	–	0
Wake Forest		–		1	–	0	–	0
VMI		–		3	–	0	–	1
Vanderbilt		–		3	–	1	–	0
Navy		–		5	–	2	–	0
Virginia		–		2	–	1	–	2
Delaware		–		5	–	3	–	1
Kentucky State College		–		1	–	1	–	0
Georgetown		–		2	–	2	–	0
Sewanee		–		1	–	2	–	0
Central (KY)		–		0	–	1	–	0
Furman		–		0	–	1	–	0
Tennessee		–		0	–	1	–	0
West Virginia		–		0	–	1	–	0
Johns Hopkins		–		0	–	2	–	0
North Carolina		–		0	–	2	–	0
Richmond		–		0	–	2	–	0

The 1891 Furman Baptists football team represented Furman University as an independent during the 1891 college football season. Led by first-year head coach H. P. Young, Furman compiled a record of 0–1.

== Schedule ==
Date	Opponent	Site	Result	Source
November 14	vs. Trinity (NC)	Columbia, SC	L 0–96	
