= Frederick Lincoln Emory =

American football coach and professor

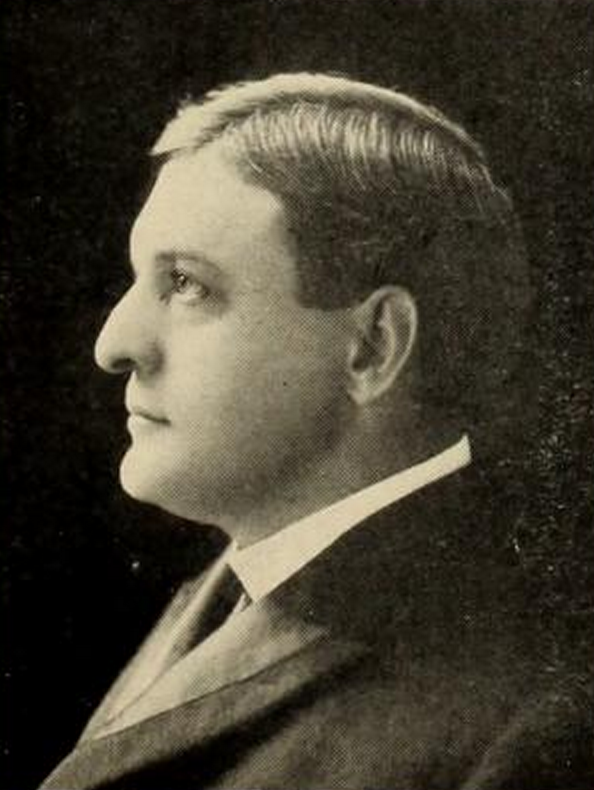
- Emory pictured in The Monticola, West Virginia yearbook

Biographical details
- Born: April 10, 1867; Lunenburg, Massachusetts, U.S.
- Died: December 31, 1919 (aged 52); Morgantown, West Virginia, U.S.

Coaching career (HC unless noted)
- 1891: West Virginia

Head coaching record
- Overall: 0–1

Frederick Lincoln Emory (April 10, 1867 – December 31, 1919) was an American college football coach and professor of mechanics and applied mathematics. He served as the first head football coach at West Virginia University, coaching one game in 1891. The single game that he coached was played on November 28, 1891, against Washington and Jefferson. The West Virginia Mountaineers lost by a score of 72 to zero, the second-worst loss in the history of the program.

Emory died in 1919 from heart-related problems.

== Head coaching record ==
Year	Team	Overall	Conference	Standing	Bowl/playoffs
West Virginia Mountaineers (Independent) (1891)
1891	West Virginia	0–1			
West Virginia:		0–1			
Total:		0–1			
