= Stonewall Jackson High School =

Stonewall Jackson High School was the name of several schools in the United States:

- Stonewall Jackson High School (Kanawha County, West Virginia), closed in 1989, now West Side Middle School since 2020.
- Unity Reed High School in Bull Run, Virginia was called Stonewall Jackson High School until 2020.
- Stonewall Jackson High School (Shenandoah County, Virginia) had its name changed to "Mountain View High School", then had its name changed back.

== See also ==
- Stonewall Jackson School (disambiguation)
