= Stoll Keenon Ogden =

Stoll Keenon Ogden PLLC (SKO) is a law firm with six offices in Kentucky and Indiana. Founded in 1897, SKO is one of the oldest and largest law firms in the region.

As of 2025, SKO employs almost 160 attorneys, representing business clients and individuals on local, state, national and international levels.

== History ==
=== Early origins ===
Stoll Keenon Ogden traces its founding to 1897 in Lexington, Kentucky, by Yale Law School graduate, Richard C. Stoll.

In 1898, Stoll was appointed to the University of Kentucky Board of Trustees. He was re-appointed consecutively by seven governors and served on the board for 47 years. During his tenure at the university, Stoll was appointed Fayette Circuit Court Judge for the 22nd Judicial District in 1921. By 1928, Judge Stoll was elected president of the Circuit Judges of Kentucky, and he served until his resignation from the bench in 1931.

=== 1930–1947 ===
In 1930, Judge Stoll and three lawyers — Wallace Muir, William H. Townsend and James Park—formed a law firm as a “continuous entity” in Lexington. Stoll, Muir, Townsend & Park was located on the sixth floor of the First National Bank & Trust Company building at the corner of Cheapside and Main.

Gayle Mohney joined the firm in 1931, following his graduation from the University of Kentucky College of Law. During his 49-year professional career, Mohney established a national reputation as an expert lawyer in the thoroughbred industry. In 1935, along with Hal Price Headley, he developed a syndication agreement and plan to form the Keeneland Association as “a thoroughbred breeders” racetrack and sales company. Today, the Keeneland Association is the world's leading thoroughbred auction company, and SKO continues to enjoy its longstanding reputation as Keeneland's legal counsel.

=== 1948–2005 ===
In 1948, Stoll, Muir, Townsend & Park merged with Keenon, Huguelet and Odear and adopted the name Stoll, Keenon & Park. Rodman Keenon, a trial lawyer and former state senator from Fayette County, had previously served as clerk of the Kentucky Court of Appeals.

To more sharply define the firm's operations, William M. Lear Jr. was appointed the firm's first Managing Partner in 1985. His duties included organizing the practice of the firm through a committee system and providing periodic reports to the firm's attorneys.

=== 2006–2011 ===
In January 2006, Stoll, Keenon & Park merged with Louisville-based Ogden Newell & Welch, forming Stoll Keenon Ogden PLLC.

In 2010, the firm established the James Welch Sr. Arts Leadership Award in conjunction with the Fund for the Arts, which annually recognizes distinguished individuals whose leadership has made a lasting impact in the Louisville arts community.

In 2011, the firm continued its involvement in horse racing by sponsoring the oldest thoroughbred horse race in North America—the Phoenix Stakes —which first ran in 1831. Today, the Stoll Keenon Ogden Phoenix Stakes runs on the opening day of Keeneland's fall meet.

=== 2012–2019 ===
In 2016, P. Douglas Barr replaced William Lear as managing director of the firm. Barr became the fourth person in the firm's history to manage operations and strategic direction.

In 2017, Stoll Keenon Ogden merged with Indiana-based Bamberger, Foreman, Oswald & Hahn, with the goal of broadening and diversifying the firm's practice in Indianapolis and Evansville. The merged firm operates as Stoll Keenon Ogden, PLLC.

Stoll Keenon Ogden continues its service to clients over decades, notably those in banking, public utilities, energy, natural gas, coal, beverage alcohol, manufacturing and equine industries.

=== 2022–present ===
July 1, 2022, Stoll Keenon Ogden merged with the renowned Indianapolis firm of Katz Korin Cunningham PC. The merged firm continues to operate as Stoll Keenon Ogden, or colloquially, as "SKO." SKO's Indianapolis location is now headquartered in the Historic Emelie Building at 334 North Senate Avenue, Indianapolis Indiana, which had been the home of Katz Korin Cunningham for decades prior to the merger.

=== Growth ===
1930 – Judge Stoll, Wallace Muir, William H. Townsend and James Park form a law firm known as a “continuous entity” in Lexington, known as Stoll, Muir, Townsend & Park.

1948 – The firm merges with Keenon, Huguelet and Odear and adopts the name Stoll, Keenon & Park.

1982 – Stoll, Keenon & Park acquires the Frankfort-based firm Johnson & Judy.

1993 – Stoll, Keenon & Park opens a Louisville office with Samuel D. Hinkle IV and Lea Pauley Goff, both of whom are still with the firm.

1998 – Firm expands in western Kentucky, acquiring Sheffer Hoffman in Henderson.

2006 – Stoll, Keenon & Park merges with Ogden Newell & Welch, forming Stoll Keenon Ogden PLLC.

2017 – Stoll Keenon Ogden PLLC merges with Indiana-based Bamberger, Foreman, Oswald & Hahn, adding 10 attorneys to the firm's Evansville team and an office in Indianapolis with five attorneys.

2022 – Stoll Keenon Ogden PLLC merges with Indianapolis-based Katz Korin Cunningham, PC, adding approximately 40 attorneys to the firm.

== Practice areas ==
SKO attorneys provide legal counsel to clients in Commercial Litigation, Transactional Law, Labor & Employment Law and Utility & Regulatory Law, with more than 40 practice areas, including Bankruptcy & Financial Restructuring, Equine Law, Securities & Corporate Governance, Immigration, Trusts & Estates, Real Estate, Intellectual Property, and Labor, Employment & Employee Benefits.

== Notable lawyers and alumni ==
- Allison Lundergan Grimes, Secretary of State of Kentucky
- Laurance B. VanMeter, Chief Justice of the Kentucky Supreme Court
- David W. Tandy, former Louisville Metro Council member
