= Pamela R. Goodwine =

American judge (born 1959 or 1960)

Pamela Goodwine

Justice of the Kentucky Supreme Court
- Incumbent
- Assumed office January 6, 2025
- Preceded by: Laurance B. VanMeter

Personal details
- Born: 1959 or 1960 (age 65–66) Youngstown, Ohio, U.S.
- Children: 2
- Education: University of Kentucky (BA, JD); Duke University (LLM)

Pamela R. Goodwine (born 1959 or 1960) is an American judge serving as justice of the Kentucky Supreme Court; she was elected to the court in 2024. She previously held roles as a district and circuit judge in Fayette County and as a judge on the Kentucky Court of Appeals, becoming the first Black woman from Lexington to serve on both the appellate and Supreme Court levels in Kentucky.

== Early life ==
Goodwine is from Youngstown, Ohio. After completing high school, she initially pursued a career as a court stenographer, working in Kentucky. Her interest in the legal field developed further, prompting her to attend college. In 1991, she graduated with a degree from the University of Kentucky's Gatton College of Business and Economics. Following her undergraduate studies, she enrolled in the University of Kentucky College of Law, where she obtained a J.D. in 1994.

== Career ==
Goodwine was admitted to the Kentucky Bar in October 1994 and began her legal career at Wyatt, Tarrant & Combs, a private law firm where she worked until her appointment to the judiciary in 1999. Her public service career began with an appointment to the Kentucky District Court bench in August 1999, making her the first African American woman appointed to the bench in Fayette County. She was subsequently elected to continue serving as a district judge, a role she held until November 2003.

In November 2003, Goodwine was elected as a circuit judge for Fayette County, where she served for 15 years until 2018. During her tenure as a circuit judge, she held the position of Chief Regional Circuit Judge. She presided over Fayette County Specialty Court from 2011 until her election to the Kentucky Court of Appeals in November 2018. Goodwine was re-elected to the Court of Appeals unopposed in 2022. In January 2023, she was appointed Chief Judge Pro Tem of the Kentucky Court of Appeals.

In May 2023, Goodwine completed an Master of Laws in Judicial Studies from Duke University School of Law. This two-year program culminated in a thesis titled Fighting Death: A Critique of Kentucky’s Death Penalty System, which was scheduled for publication in the Kentucky Law Journal in spring 2024.

During the 2024 Kentucky Supreme Court election, Goodwine was elected to the Kentucky Supreme Court, becoming the first Black woman from Lexington, Kentucky or Fayette County to achieve this position. This role capped off a career that had spanned nearly 25 years in Kentucky's judiciary, with service at every level from district court to the state's highest court.

== Personal life ==
Goodwine has faced several personal challenges throughout her life. In her twenties, Goodwine's father died of cancer and her mother to a domestic violence incident. She has Crohn's disease, which required multiple surgeries. Goodwine credits her resilience to support from family and her church community in Lexington.

Goodwine is married to Lee A. Padgett Jr., and together they have two children. She has been a certified Jazzercise instructor since 2012.

== Electoral history ==
2003 22nd Kentucky Circuit Court, 4th division special election
Party	Candidate	Votes	%
Nonpartisan	Pamela R. Goodwine	38,156	56.5
Nonpartisan	Tim Philpot	29,365	43.5
Total votes		67,791	100.0

2006 22nd Kentucky Circuit Court, 4th division election
Party	Candidate	Votes	%
Nonpartisan	Pamela R. Goodwine (incumbent)	Unopposed	
Total votes		49,512	100.0

2014 22nd Kentucky Circuit Court, 4th division election
Party	Candidate	Votes	%
Nonpartisan	Pamela R. Goodwine (incumbent)	Unopposed	
Total votes		57,096	100.0

2018 Kentucky Court of Appeals 5th district, 1st division special election
Party	Candidate	Votes	%
Nonpartisan	Pamela R. Goodwine	126,373	56.1
Nonpartisan	Rob Johnson	98,861	43.9
Total votes		225,234	100.0

2022 Kentucky Court of Appeals 5th district, 1st division election
Party	Candidate	Votes	%
Nonpartisan	Pamela R. Goodwine (incumbent)	Unopposed	
Total votes		132,184	100.0

2024 Kentucky Supreme Court 5th district election
Party	Candidate	Votes	%
Nonpartisan	Pamela R. Goodwine	183,821	76.9
Nonpartisan	Erin Izzo	55,085	23.1
Total votes		238,906	100.0

Legal offices
Preceded by Laurance B. VanMeter	Justice of the Kentucky Supreme Court; 2025–present	Incumbent
