= A. Y. Jackson Secondary School =

A. Y. Jackson Secondary School can refer to two high schools in Ontario, Canada:

- A. Y. Jackson Secondary School (Ottawa), in the Kanata area of Ottawa
- A. Y. Jackson Secondary School (Toronto), in the North York area of Toronto
