= 1891 VMI Keydets football team =

American college football season

1891 VMI Keydets football
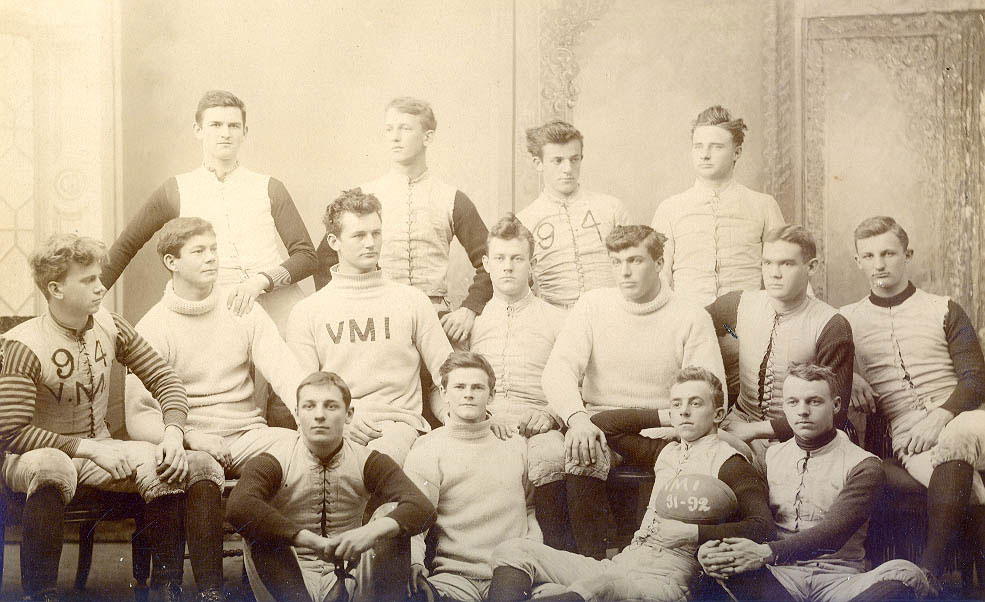
- Conference: Independent
- Record: 3–0–1
- Head coach: Walter Taylor (1st season)

1891 Southern college football independents records
	Conf.			Overall
Team	W	L	T	W		L		T
Trinity (NC)		–		3	–	0	–	0
Wake Forest		–		1	–	0	–	0
VMI		–		3	–	0	–	1
Vanderbilt		–		3	–	1	–	0
Navy		–		5	–	2	–	0
Virginia		–		2	–	1	–	2
Delaware		–		5	–	3	–	1
Kentucky State College		–		1	–	1	–	0
Georgetown		–		2	–	2	–	0
Sewanee		–		1	–	2	–	0
Central (KY)		–		0	–	1	–	0
Furman		–		0	–	1	–	0
Tennessee		–		0	–	1	–	0
West Virginia		–		0	–	1	–	0
Johns Hopkins		–		0	–	2	–	0
North Carolina		–		0	–	2	–	0
Richmond		–		0	–	2	–	0

The 1891 VMI Keydets football team represented the Virginia Military Institute (VMI) in their first season of organized football. In 1873, however, VMI played Washington and Lee in their only game of the season, losing 4–2. No coaching or player records are known from that game.

== Schedule ==
Date	Opponent	Site	Result
October 31	Washington and Lee	Unknown; Lexington, VA	W 6–0
November 11	Washington and Lee	Unknown; Lexington, VA	T 0–0
November 12	St. John's (MD)	Unknown; Lexington, VA	W 18–0
November 20	at Pantops Academy	Unknown; Charlottesville, VA	W 28–12
