= Laurance B. VanMeter =

American judge (born 1958)

Laurance VanMeter
- VanMeter in 2026

Chief Justice of the Kentucky Supreme Court
- In office January 2, 2023 – January 6, 2025
- Preceded by: John D. Minton Jr.
- Succeeded by: Debra H. Lambert

Justice of the Kentucky Supreme Court
- In office January 2, 2017 – January 6, 2025
- Preceded by: Mary C. Noble
- Succeeded by: Pamela R. Goodwine

Judge of the Kentucky Court of Appeals
- In office 2004–2017
- Preceded by: Lewis G. Paisley
- Succeeded by: Robert G. Johnson

Judge of Kentucky's 22nd Judicial Circuit
- In office 1999–2004
- Preceded by: James E. Keller
- Succeeded by: Timothy N. Philpot

Judge of Kentucky's 22nd Judicial District
- In office 1994–1999
- Preceded by: Gary Payne
- Succeeded by: Pamela R. Goodwine

Personal details
- Born: Laurance Browning VanMeter; August 28, 1958 (age 68) Lexington, Kentucky, U.S.
- Party: Republican
- Spouse(s): Lucy Ferguson VanMeter (m. 2017); Lucy Elliot Bryans (d. 2010)
- Education: Vanderbilt University (BA); University of Kentucky (JD)

Laurance Browning VanMeter (born August 28, 1958) is an American attorney and jurist who served as the chief justice of the Kentucky Supreme Court from 2023 to 2025, and as a justice of the court from 2017 to 2025. He previously served as a district and circuit judge in Lexington before being elected to the Kentucky Court of Appeals in 2003.

He is one of five justices and the first chief justice of Kentucky to have served at all four levels of the state's court system.

== Early life and education ==
VanMeter was born in 1958 in Lexington, Kentucky, and was raised in Winchester. He earned his undergraduate degree in history from Vanderbilt University in 1980 and his Juris Doctor from the University of Kentucky College of Law in 1983.

== Career ==
VanMeter practiced law with the firm of Stoll, Keenon & Park from 1983 to 1994. From 1994 to 1999, he was district court judge for Division 1 of the 22nd Judicial District, serving Fayette County. In 1999, he was appointed to the Fayette County Circuit Court bench, where he served until his election to the Kentucky Court of Appeals.

He was elected to the Kentucky Court of Appeals in November 2003 and served there until his elevation to the Supreme Court. He was named as acting Chief Judge of the Court of Appeals in 2010.

=== Kentucky Supreme Court service ===
In 2015 VanMeter announced his candidacy for a spot on the Supreme Court due to the retirement of Mary C. Noble. He faced off against fellow Appeals Court Judge Glenn Acree on November 8, 2016, and won 74% of the vote. He began his term as a justice of the Supreme Court on January, 2017.

In November 2022, he was elected to serve as chief justice following the retirement of John D. Minton Jr. His term as chief justice began on January 2, 2023. He was sworn into office on January 9, 2023, by Minton.

In September 2023, VanMeter announced that he would be retiring at the end of his term, and would not seek reelection the next year. He was succeeded by Judge Pamela R. Goodwine of the Kentucky Court of Appeals on January 6, 2025.

== Personal life ==
VanMeter was previously married to Lucy Elliot Bryans before her death in 2010; the two had four children together. In August 2017, he married Lucy Ferguson, an attorney who would go on to be a judge of the Fayette County Circuit Court. In 2026, she was elected to the Kentucky Court of Appeals.

He is a registered Republican, and member of the Federalist Society.

Legal offices
Preceded by Mary C. Noble	Justice of the Kentucky Supreme Court; 2017–2025	Succeeded by Pamela R. Goodwine
Preceded by John D. Minton Jr.	Chief Justice of the Kentucky Supreme Court; 2023–2025	Succeeded by Debra H. Lambert
