= Richard C. Stoll =

American judge (1876–1949)

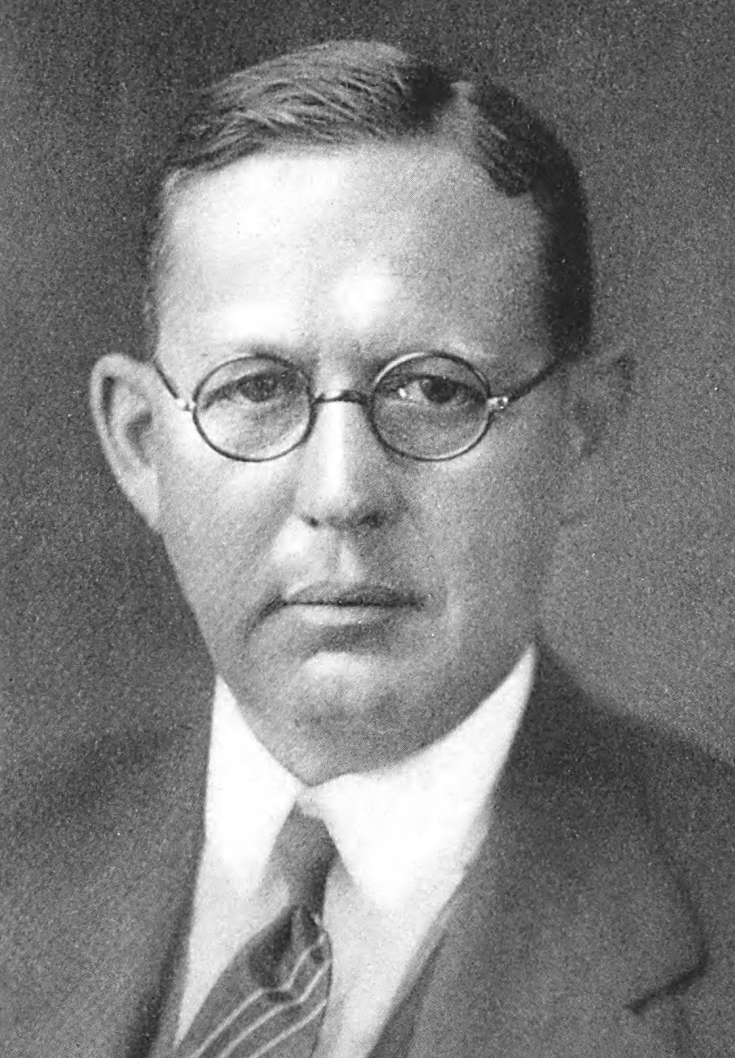
- Stoll, c. 1929
- Born: Richard Charles Stoll; March 21, 1876; Lexington, Kentucky, U.S.
- Died: June 26, 1949 (aged 73); Lexington, Kentucky, U.S.
- Occupations: Judge, attorney
- Football career

Career information
- College: Kentucky State (1891–1894)

Richard Charles Stoll (March 21, 1876 – June 26, 1949) was an American attorney, jurist, and college football player. He is the namesake of Stoll Field at the University of Kentucky, and the origin for the school's color scheme.

== Early life ==
Richard Charles Stoll was born on March 21, 1876, in Lexington, Kentucky. His parents were Elvina and Richard Pindall Stoll, a member of the Kentucky General Assembly and a former federal alcohol revenue agent who established and was president numerous whiskey-related businesses.

Stoll attended the University of Kentucky (then known as Kentucky State College). While there, he was a member of Kappa Alpha Order and Omicron Delta Kappa. In 1894, he was manager of the Kentucky Wildcats baseball team and captain of the Kentucky Wildcats track team, winning the relay event at the first intercollegiate field day in 1894.

Stoll was a varsity letterman for the Kentucky Wildcats football team and lettered in football from 1889 to 1894. He was the origin for the school's color scheme which was officially adopted in 1892. According to the university:

UK students...decided on blue and light yellow prior to the Kentucky-Centre College football game on December 19, 1891. The shade of blue, which is close to a royal blue, was chosen when a student asked the question, "What color blue?" At the time, Richard C. Stoll...pulled off his necktie and held it up. The students then adopted that particular shade of blue. A year later, UK students officially dropped the light yellow color for white.

Stoll graduated from Kentucky State College in 1895 with a B.A, Phi Beta Kappa. He then entered Yale Law School, graduating with a Bachelors of Laws in 1897, Order of the Coif. He was admitted to the bar in the Commonwealth of Kentucky in 1897.

== Career ==
Stoll organized the law firm Stoll and Muir in Lexington. Later, he was a senior partner with what had evolved into Stoll, Muir, Townsend, Park and Mohney; the firm is now known as Stoll Keenon Ogden. He was the lawyer for Kentucky Tracition and Terminal Company (the city's transit system) and the Lexington Utilities Company. In 1898, he was a member of the military staff of Governor William O'Connell Bradley, achieving the rank of colonel.

Stoll was a delegate to the Republican National Convention from Kentucky in 1912, 1916, and 1920. Following World War I in 1918 and 1919, he headed the American Protective League and was chairman of the Commission of Public Safety with the Kentucky Council for Defense.

In 1921, Stoll was appointed to fill the unexpired term of the circuit judge of the 22nd Judicial District in Fayette Circuit. He was elected to continue serving as a circuilt judge in 1923 and 192.

Stoll was president of the Lexington Bar Association in 1921 and was president of the Kentucky Bar Association in 1922. He was a director of the Federal Home Land Bank, First National Bank and Trust Company, and Southeastern Greyhound Lines. He was a member of the American Bar Association and the American Law Institute.

== Honors ==
Stoll is the namesake of Stoll Field, dedicated at the University of Kentucky in 1916. He received the Alma Magna Mater trophy from the University of Kentucky in November 1948. In February 1965, Stoll was named to the University of Kentucky's Hall of Distinguished Alumni.

== Personal life ==
Stoll married Josie Thrall of Cincinnati, Ohio on November 14, 1900. He married his second wife, Angeline Chestnut of Danville, Kentucky, in 1919. They had a son, Richard Stoll, who was an attorney.

Stoll served on the board of trustees of the University of Kentucky for nearly fifty years, from 1898 to 1904 and 1907 until his death. He was vice chair of the board and chairman of the executive committee. He was chairman of the board of the Kentucky Agricultural Experimental Station. He was also president of the Kentucky Trotting Horse Breeders' Association and a director of the Keeneland Association.

Stoll was a member of the Republic Club and the Yale Club. He belonged to the Lexington Lodge No. 1 Free and Accepted Masons, Lexington Chapter No. 1 Royal Arch Masons, and the Oleka Temple of the Ancient Order of the Order of the Mystic Shrine. He was a member of the Presbyterian Church.

Stoll died on June 26, 1949, aged 73, in Lexington, Kentucky. He was buried in Lexington Cemetery.
