= Fanny Jackson Coppin School =

School in Philadelphia, Pennsylvania, United States

- Fanny Jackson Coppin School (As The Federal Street School)
- U.S. National Register of Historic Places
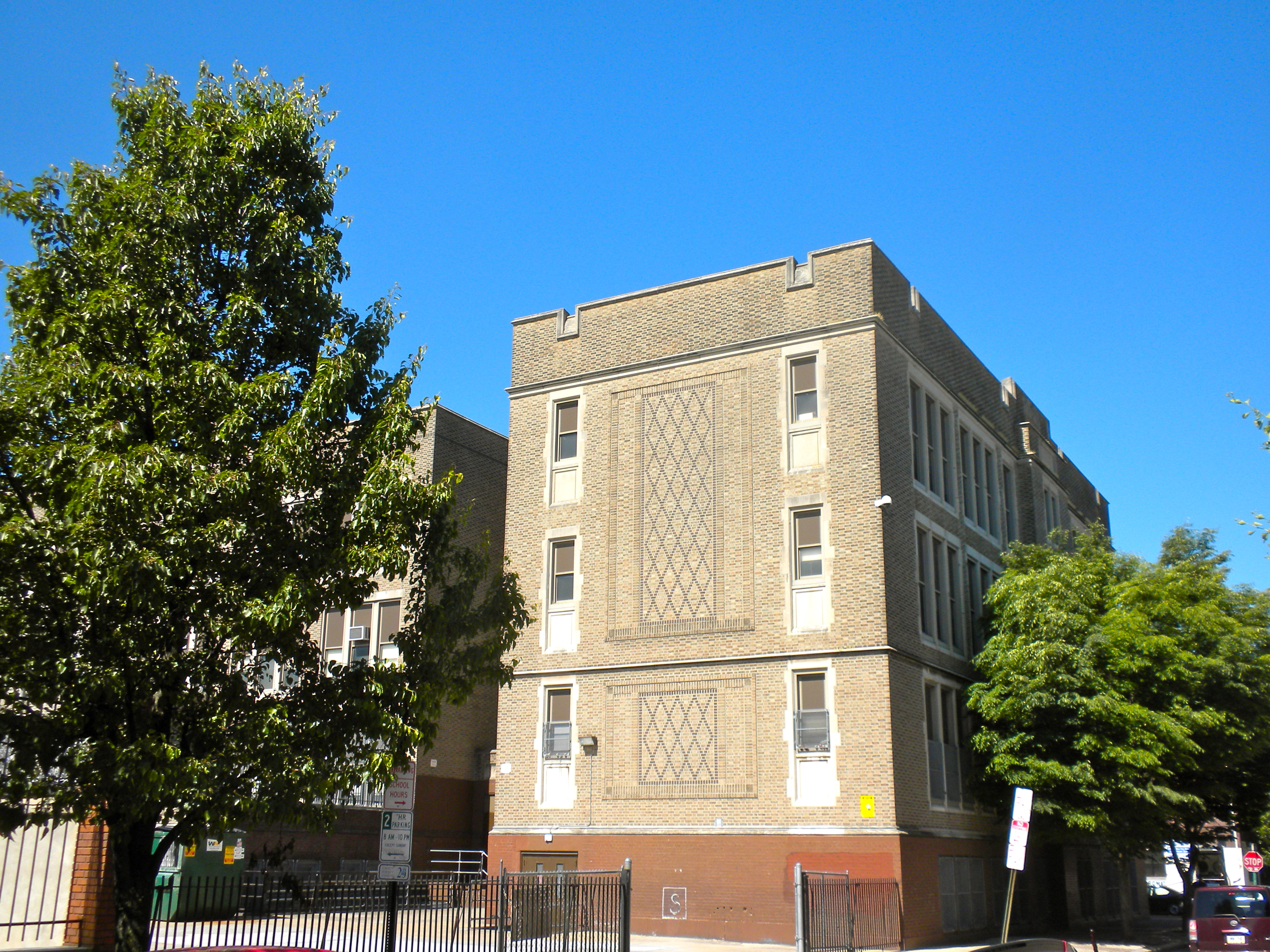
- Fanny Jackson Coppin School, May 2010 (then Andrew Jackson School)

- Location within Philadelphia Location within Pennsylvania Location within the United States
- Location: 1213 S. 12th St. Philadelphia, Pennsylvania, U.S.
- Coordinates: 39°56′05″N 75°09′48″W
- Area: 1 acre (0.40 ha)
- Built: 1924–1925
- Built by: B. Fennimore
- Architect: Irwin T. Catharine
- Architectural style: Late Gothic Revival, Academic Gothic
- MPS: Philadelphia Public Schools TR
- NRHP reference No.: 86003294
- Added to NRHP: December 1, 1996

Fanny Jackson Coppin School, previously Federal Street School and then Andrew Jackson School, is a public K-8 school located in the Passyunk Square neighborhood of South Philadelphia, Philadelphia, Pennsylvania. It is a part of the School District of Philadelphia. The school was previously named for United States President Andrew Jackson before changing the name in 2021 to honor former Philadelphia teacher Fanny Jackson Coppin.

The historic school building was designed by Irwin T. Catharine and built in 1924–1925. It is a three-story, brick and limestone in the Late Gothic Revival-style. It features a projecting center two-story bay, projecting building ends with decorative brick panels, compound arched entrance, and a brick parapet.

== History ==
The original Federal Street School was renamed the Jackson School in 1848. It had two property deeds, February 28, 1838 and January 1, 1842.

The current school building, designed by B. Fennimore and Irwin T. Catharine, opened in 1924. It uses a Late Gothic Revival style. It was added to the National Register of Historic Places in 1996, in the register as the "Federal Street School".

Kristen Graham of The Philadelphia Inquirer wrote that circa 2009 the school had a "tough reputation", a previously smaller student body, and constant interaction with the police; it improved after Lisa Ciaranca Kaplan became the principal.

In 2013 Albert Stumm of the Passyunk Post stated that by that year the school had "made great progress" due to actions from the principal, who was highly regarded by the parents; in addition, improvement came from the efforts of the Passyunk Square Civic education committee and other neighborhood activists.

In 2013 the school district passed a severe budget cut which would eliminate the nurse, security monitors, counselors, aides, and secretaries; as well as eliminating funding for the school's rock band and school supplies. Stumm stated that there was still the possibility that "an 11th-hour solution" could prohibit the layoffs.

Kaplan won the 2015 Escalante-Gradillas Prize for Best in Education. That year, real estate agents promoted residences within the Jackson attendance zone, using the school as a selling point.

The school received its current name in 2021. All of the members of the school board decided to rename the school. After the renaming, Coppin State University made a deal in which graduates of Coppin School may get free tuition at the university. The removal of Jackson's name was due to the Trail of Tears and his possession of slaves, and there was a petition asking to remove the name. Mallory Falk of WHYY-FM states that Andrew Jackson lacked a "significant connection to Philadelphia."

In 2022, Coppin K-8 had about 500 students.

== Student body ==
Circa 2009 Jackson had 230 students. As of 2013 the school had 410 students, with almost all of them qualifying for free or reduced lunch, an indicator of poverty. As of that year, the students spoke 14 languages.

By 2015 the student body had increased to 530, 30% of whom spoke English as a second language, and 94% of whom lived below the poverty line. As of that year 33% of the students were Hispanic; many Mexicans had immigrated to the area where the school resides. As of 2016 there are 17 languages and 24 countries of origin represented in the student body. That year 85% of the students were other than non-Hispanic white.

== Programs ==
The school's music program has a rock band, "Home," consisting of pupils. As of 2013, it was known in the local area. The 2013 funding crisis caused the district to eliminate the budget for the band. In 2015 the Wawa Foundation, the charity of Wawa Inc., donated $2,500 to the music program.

As of 2011 the school has a summer school program that admits children from the surrounding area. Graham stated that it had "robust" attendance.

== Feeder patterns ==
Neighborhoods assigned to Jackson are also assigned to Furness High School.

== Gallery ==
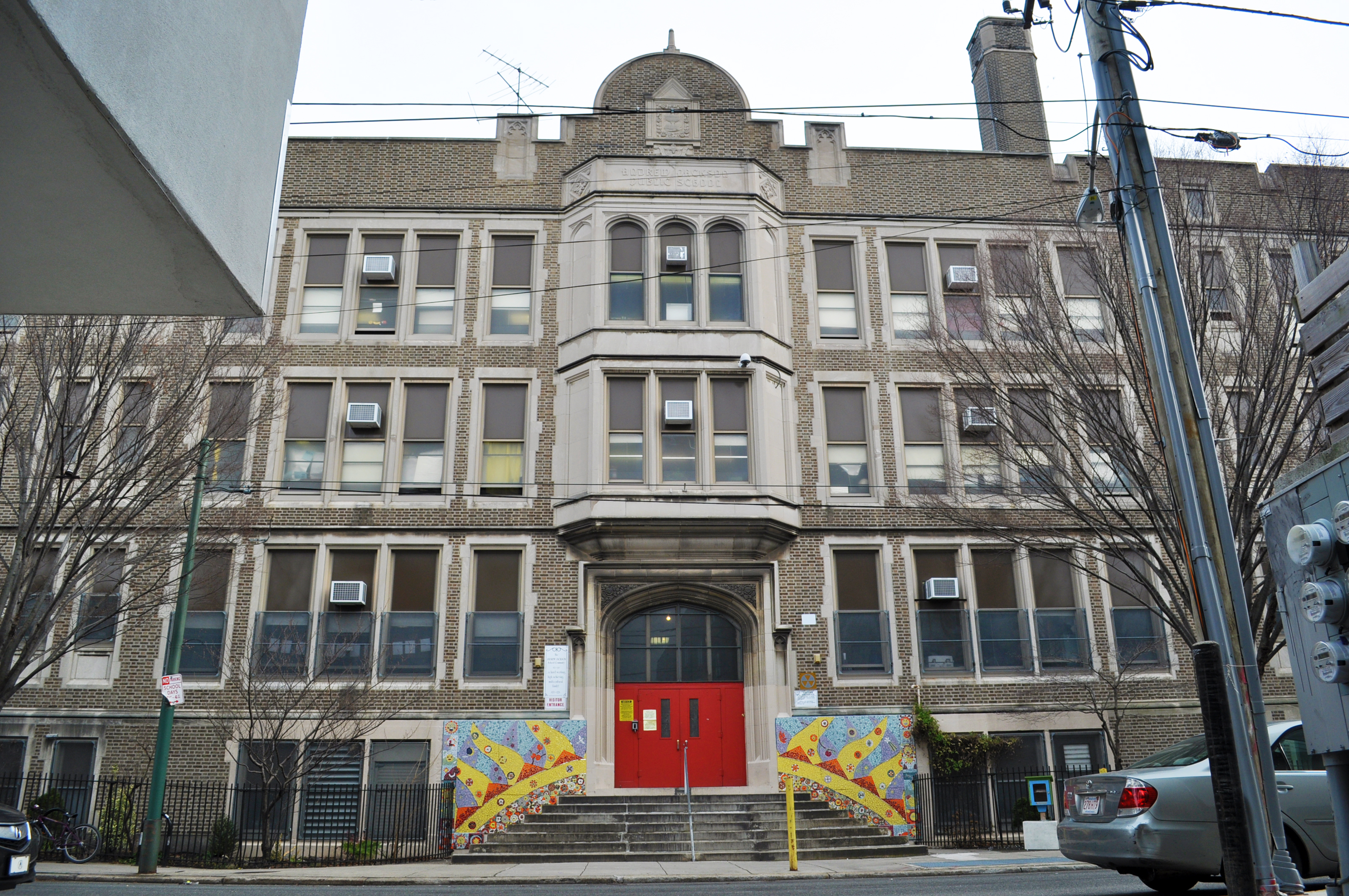

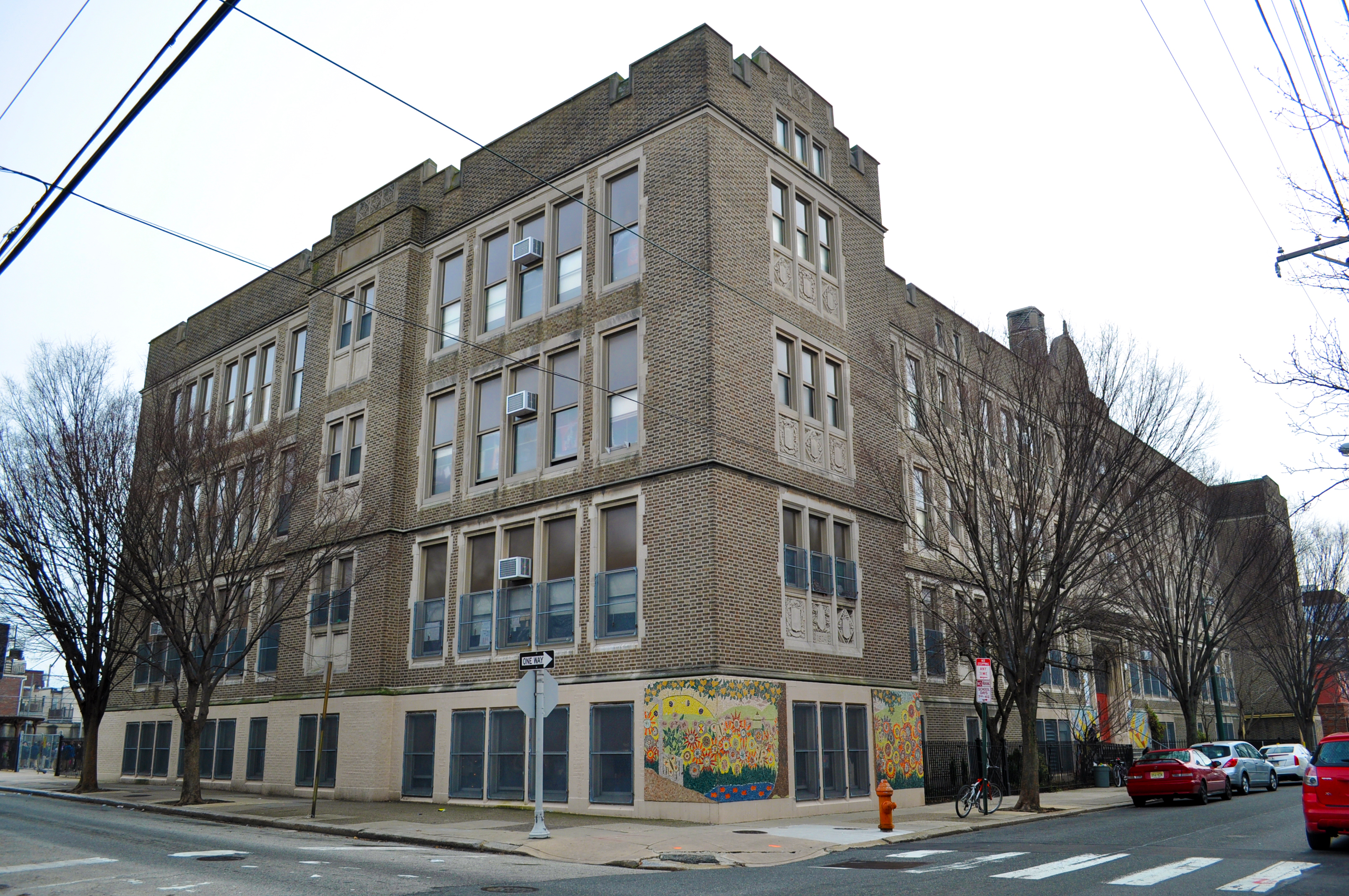

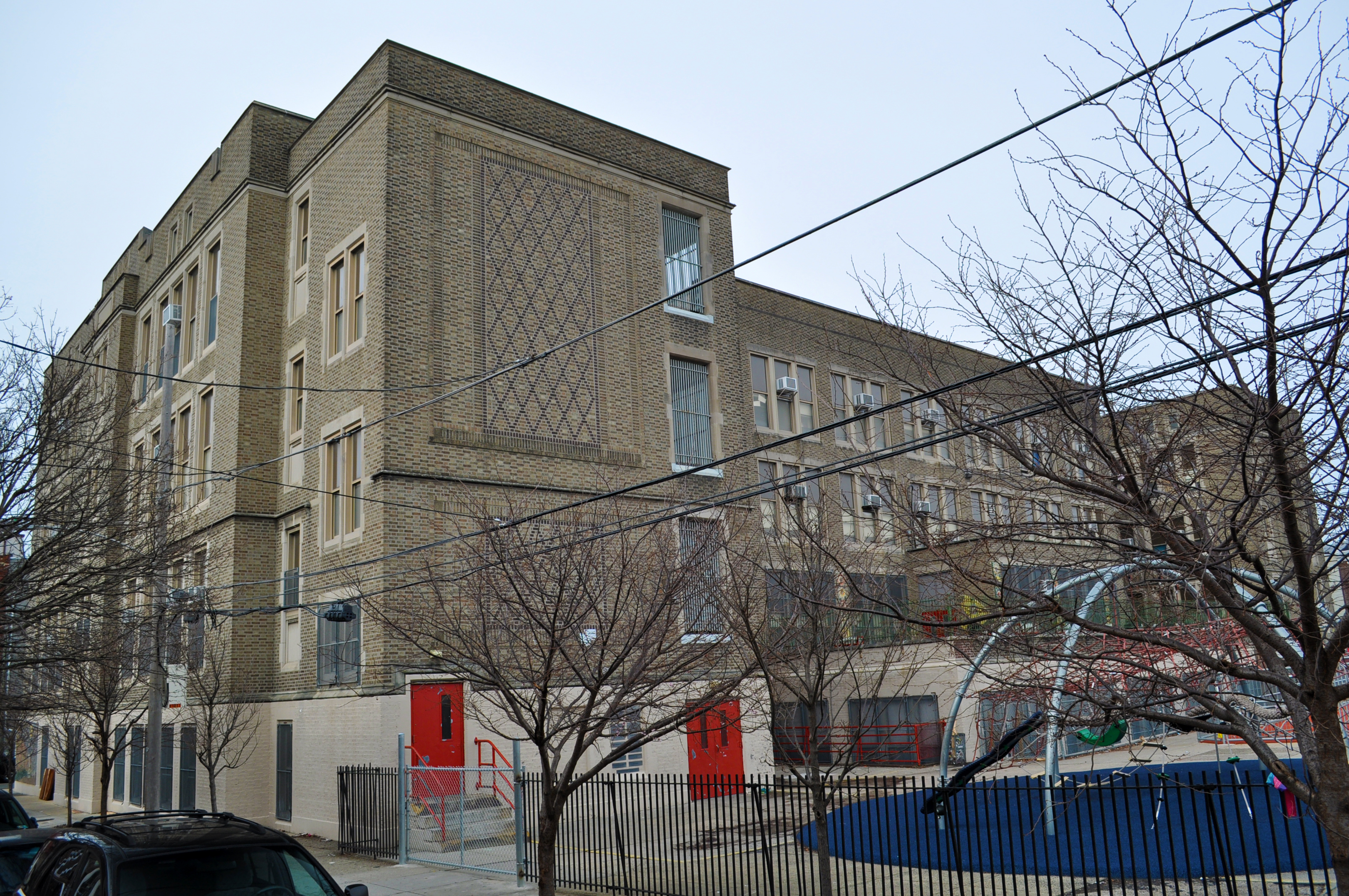

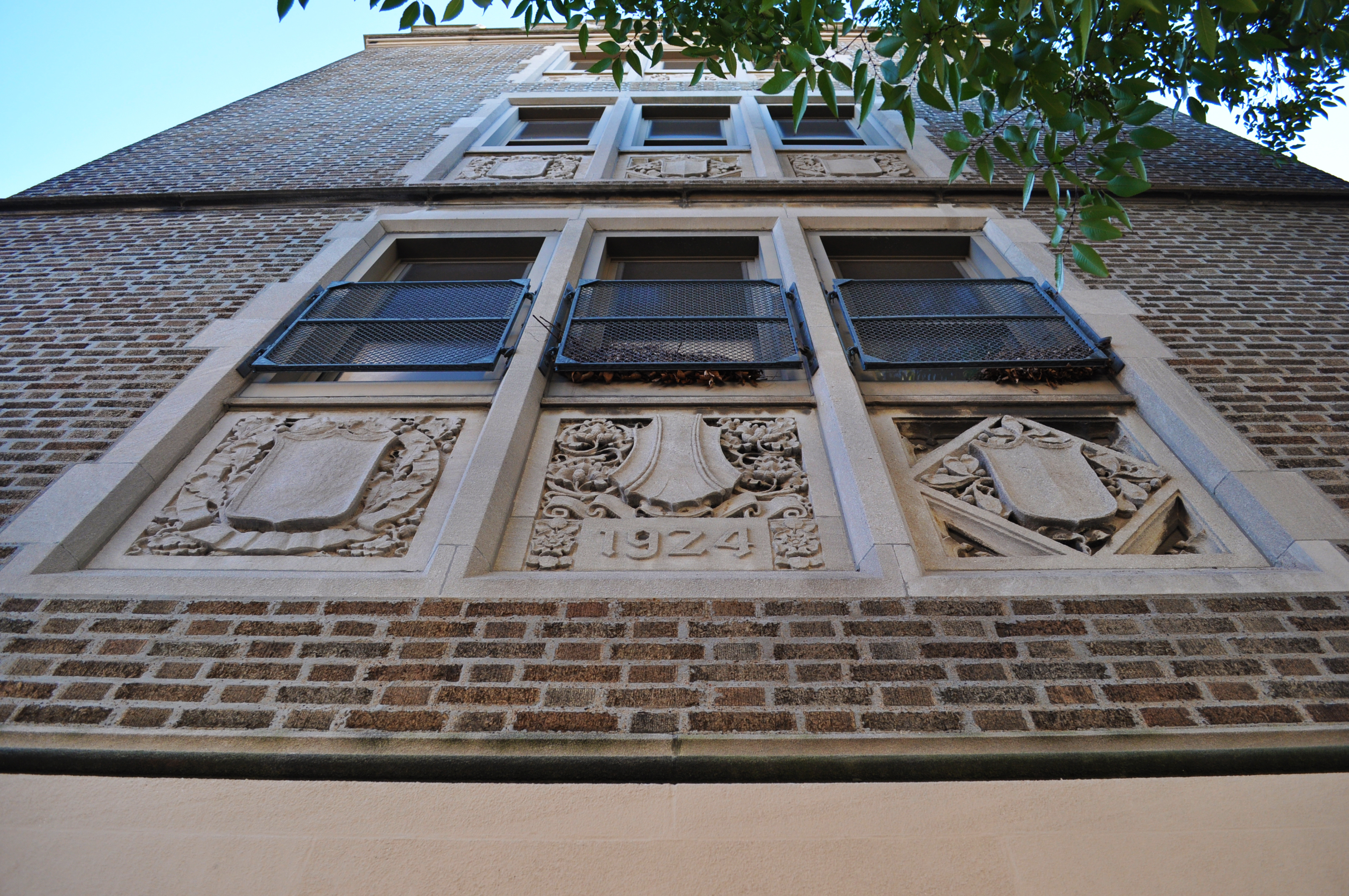

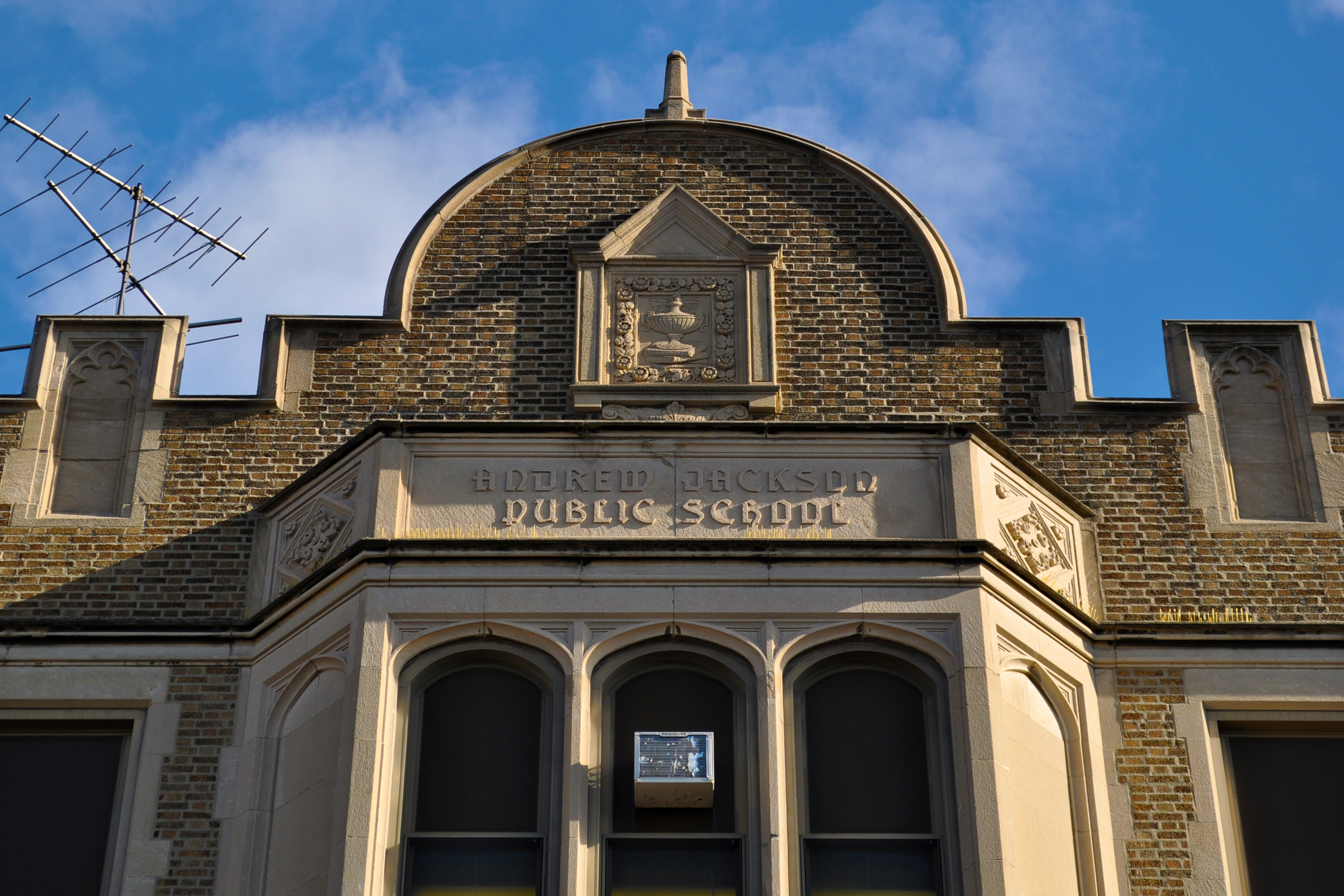
