= Stonewall Jackson School (Virginia) =

Historic school building in Virginia, US

- U.S. National Register of Historic Places
- Virginia Landmarks Register
- Richmond City Historic District
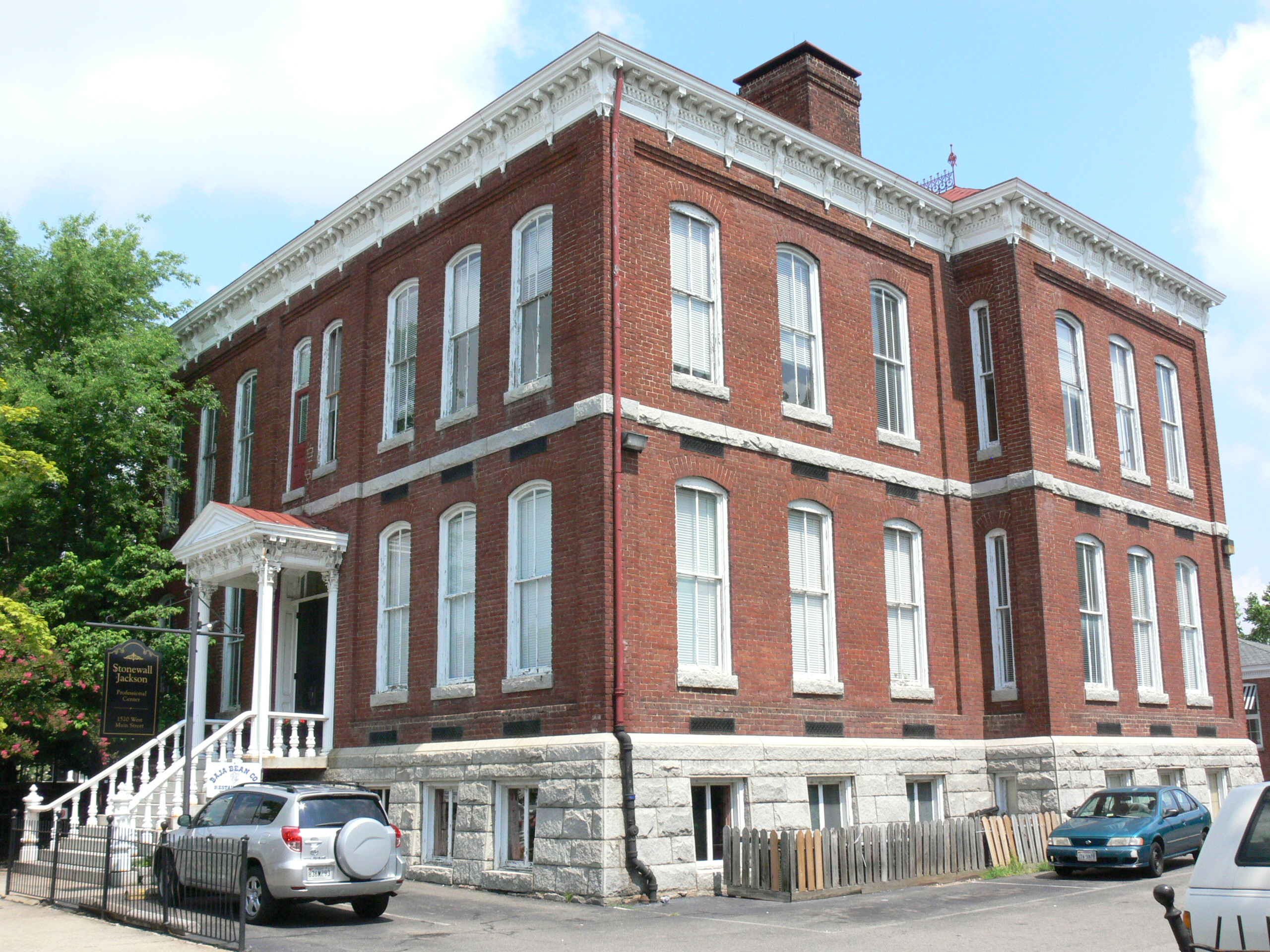
- Stonewall Jackson School, July 2011

- Location within Virginia Location within the United States
- Location: 1520 W. Main St., Richmond, Virginia
- Coordinates: 37°32′51″N 77°27′39″W
- Area: 0.7 acres (0.28 ha)
- Built: 1886-1887
- Architectural style: Italianate
- NRHP reference No.: 84003576
- VLR No.: 127-0376

Significant dates
- Added to NRHP: May 3, 1984
- Designated VLR: March 30, 1984

Stonewall Jackson School, also known as West End School, is a historic school building located in Richmond, Virginia. It was built in 1886–1887, is a tall two-story, brick and granite school building in the Italianate style. It features a bracketed cornice and shallow, standing seam metal, hipped roof. The building consists of identical wings facing west and south, and a connecting curved bay, which contains a double stair. Each wing has a cast-iron, Corinthian order porch, flanked by three bay classrooms. The building has been converted to professional offices.

It was added to the National Register of Historic Places in 1984.
