= 1891 Yale Bulldogs football team =

American college football season

1891 Yale Bulldogs football
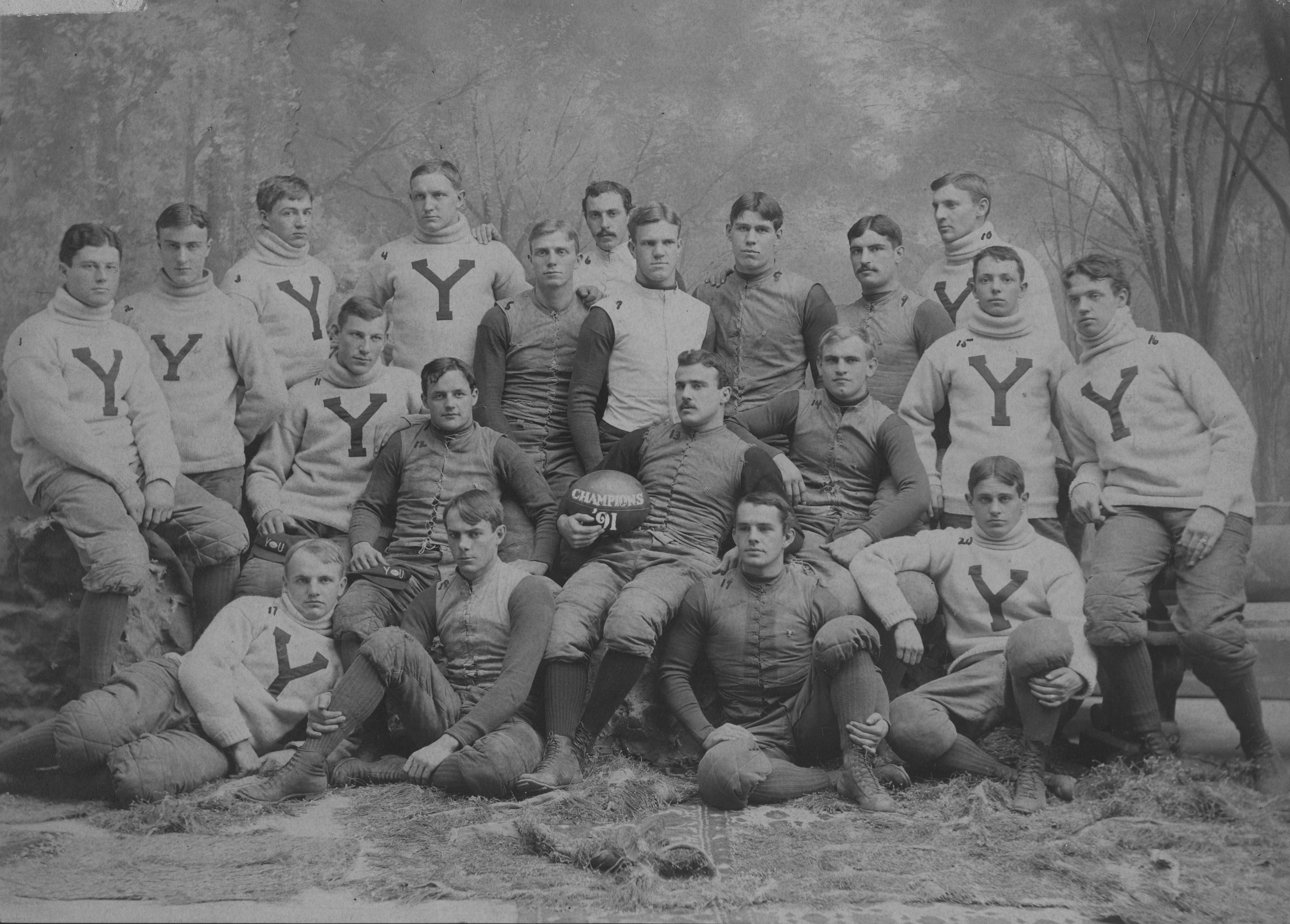

National champion IFA champion
- Conference: Intercollegiate Football Association
- Record: 13–0 ( IFA)
- Head coach: Walter Camp (4th season)
- Captain: Lee McClung
- Home stadium: Yale Field

1891 Eastern college football independents records
	Conf.			Overall
Team	W	L	T	W		L		T
Yale		–		13	–	0	–	0
Harvard		–		13	–	1	–	0
Princeton		–		12	–	1	–	0
Tufts		–		7	–	1	–	0
Penn		–		11	–	2	–	0
Colgate		–		4	–	1	–	0
Army		–		4	–	1	–	1
Bucknell		–		6	–	2	–	1
Navy		–		5	–	2	–	0
Cornell		–		7	–	3	–	0
Geneva		–		4	–	2	–	0
Washington & Jefferson		–		4	–	2	–	0
Lehigh		–		7	–	4	–	0
Rutgers		–		8	–	6	–	0
Brown		–		4	–	6	–	0
Springfield YMCA		–		5	–	8	–	1
Fordham		–		1	–	2	–	1
Syracuse		–		4	–	7	–	0
Massachusetts		–		2	–	5	–	0
Western Univ. Penn.		–		2	–	6	–	0
Lafayette		–		2	–	9	–	1
NYU		–		1	–	4	–	0
Columbia		–		1	–	5	–	0
Wesleyan		–		1	–	6	–	0

The 1891 Yale Bulldogs football team represented Yale University in the 1891 college football season. The team finished with a 13–0 record and a 488–0 season score. It was retroactively named as the national champion by the Billingsley Report, Helms Athletic Foundation, Houlgate System, National Championship Foundation, and Parke H. Davis. Yale's 1891 season was part of a 37-game winning streak that began with the final game of the 1890 season and stopped at the end of the 1893 season.

Five Yale players were selected by Caspar Whitney to the 1891 All-America college football team: halfback and team captain Lee McClung; ends Frank Hinkey and John A. Hartwell; tackle Wallace Winter; and guard Pudge Heffelfinger. Camp also selected the following Yale players to his second team: quarterback Frank Barbour; halfback Laurie Bliss; guard Samuel Morison; and center George Sanford.

== Schedule ==
Date	Time	Opponent	Site	Result	Attendance	Source
September 30		Wesleyan	Yale Field; New Haven, CT	W 28–0		
October 3		at Crescent Athletic Club	Eastern Park; Brooklyn, NY	W 26–0	3,000	
October 7		at Trinity (CT)	Hartford, CT	W 36–0		
October 10		vs. Williams	Ridgefield grounds; Albany, NY	W 46–0	2,000–2,500	
October 14		Springfield YMCA	Yale Field; New Haven, CT	W 28–0	500	
October 24	3:30 p.m.	at Orange Athletic Club	Orange Oval; Orange, NJ	W 36–0	2,700	
October 31		Lehigh	Yale Field; New Haven, CT	W 38–0		
November 3		Crescent Athletic Club	Yale Field; New Haven, CT	W 70–0	5,600	
November 7		Wesleyan	Yale Field; New Haven, CT	W 76–0		
November 11	2:30 p.m.	Amherst	Yale Field; New Haven, CT	W 27–0	350	
November 14		vs. Penn	Polo Grounds; New York, NY	W 48–0		
November 21		vs. Harvard	Hampden Park; Springfield, MA (rivalry)	W 10–0	20,000–25,000	
November 26		vs. Princeton	Manhattan Field; New York, NY (rivalry)	W 19–0	40,000	

== Roster ==
- William Adams
- Frank Barbour, QB
- Hugh Aiken Bayne
- Anson M. Beard, G
- C. D. Bliss, HB
- Laurie Bliss, HB
- Thomas Cochran, E
- Edward V. Cox
- Ben Crosby, E
- Thomas Dyer, FB
- Harmon S. Graves
- Henry S. Graves
- John A. Hartwell, E
- Pudge Heffelfinger, G
- Frank Hinkey
- Jenkins, G
- Lee McClung, HB
- Vance C. McCormick, FB
- Eugene Messler, T
- Charles W. Mills, T
- Stanford N. Morison, G
- William H. Norton
- Noyes, FB
- Ralph Delahaye Paine, C
- William M. Richards, FB
- George Sanford, C
- Phillip Stillman, C
- Alexander Hamilton Wallis, T
- Wallace Winter, T

== Game summaries ==
=== YMCA Training School ===
On October 14, 1891, Yale defeated the team from the YMCA Training School by a score of 28–0 before a crowd of 500 persons at Yale Field in New Haven, Connecticut. Yale alumnus Amos Alonzo Stagg was the coach of the YMCA team and also played at the halfback position. Pudge Heffelfinger scored three touchdowns, and Lee McClung kicked three goals after touchdown. Halfback and team captain Lee McClung suffered a broken thumb in the game.
