= List of Syracuse Orange football seasons =

Annual records of the Syracuse Orange football team.

== Yearly records ==
Year	Team	Overall	Conference	Standing	Bowl/playoffs	Coaches^{#}	AP^{°}
No Coach (Independent) (1889)
1889	Syracuse	0–1					
Robert "Bobby" Winston (Independent) (1890)
1890	Syracuse	7–4					
William Glabraith (Independent) (1891)
1891	Syracuse	4–6					
Jordan C. Wells (Independent) (1892)
1892	Syracuse	0–8					
No Coach (Independent) (1893)
1893	Syracuse	4–9					
George H. Bond (Independent) (1894)
1894	Syracuse	6–5					
George O. Redington (Independent) (1895–1896)
1895	Syracuse	6–2					
1896	Syracuse	5–3					
Frank E. Wade (Independent) (1897–1899)
1897	Syracuse	5–3					
1898	Syracuse	8–2					
1899	Syracuse	4–4					
Edwin Sweetland (Independent) (1900–1902)
1900	Syracuse	7–2					
1901	Syracuse	7–1					
1902	Syracuse	6–2					
Jason Parish (Independent) (1903)
1903	Syracuse	5–4					
Dr. Charles Hutchins (Independent) (1904–1905)
1904	Syracuse	6–3					
1905	Syracuse	8–3					
Frank O'Neill (Independent) (1906–1907)
1906	Syracuse	6–3					
1907	Syracuse	5–3					
Howard Jones (Independent) (1908)
1908	Syracuse	6–3					
Tad Jones (Independent) (1909–1910)
1909	Syracuse	4–5					
1910	Syracuse	5–4					
DeForest Cummings (Independent) (1911–1912)
1911	Syracuse	5–3					
1912	Syracuse	4–5					
Frank O'Neill (Independent) (1913–1915)
1913	Syracuse	6–4					
1914	Syracuse	5–3					
1915	Syracuse	9–1					
William Hollenback (Independent) (1916)
1916	Syracuse	5–4					
Frank O'Neill (Independent) (1917–1919)
1917	Syracuse	8–1					
1918	Syracuse	5–1					
1919	Syracuse	6–3					
John Meehan (Independent) (1920–1924)
1920	Syracuse	6–2–1					
1921	Syracuse	7–2					
1922	Syracuse	6–1–2					
1923	Syracuse	8–1					
1924	Syracuse	8–2–1					
C.W.P. Reynolds (Independent) (1925–1926)
1925	Syracuse	8–1					
1926	Syracuse	7–2					
Lewis Andreas (Independent) (1927–1929)
1927	Syracuse	5–3					
1928	Syracuse	4–4					
1929	Syracuse	6–3					
Victor Hanson (Independent) (1930–1936)
1930	Syracuse	5–2–2					
1931	Syracuse	7–1–1					
1932	Syracuse	4–4–1					
1933	Syracuse	4–4					
1934	Syracuse	6–2					
1935	Syracuse	6–1–1					
1936	Syracuse	1–7					
Ossie Solem (Independent) (1937–1945)
1937	Syracuse	5–2–1					
1938	Syracuse	5–3					
1939	Syracuse	3–3–2					
1940	Syracuse	3–4–1					
1941	Syracuse	5–2–1					
1942	Syracuse	6–3					
1943	No team						
1944	Syracuse	2–4–1					
1945	Syracuse	1–6					
Biggie Munn (Independent) (1946)
1946	Syracuse	4–5					
Reaves Baysinger (Independent) (1947–1948)
1947	Syracuse	3–6					
1948	Syracuse	1–8					
Ben Schwartzwalder (Independent) (1949–1973)
1949	Syracuse	4–5					
1950	Syracuse	5–5					
1951	Syracuse	5–4					
1952	Syracuse	7–3			L Orange		14
1953	Syracuse	5–3–1					
1954	Syracuse	4–4					
1955	Syracuse	5–3					
1956	Syracuse	7–2			L Cotton	8	8
1957	Syracuse	5–3–1					
1958	Syracuse	8–2			L Orange	10	9
1959	Syracuse	11–0			W Cotton	1	1
1960	Syracuse	7–2					19
1961	Syracuse	8–3			W Liberty	16	16
1962	Syracuse	5–5					
1963	Syracuse	8–2				12	12
1964	Syracuse	7–4			L Sugar	12	12
1965	Syracuse	7–3				19	19
1966	Syracuse	8–3			L Gator	16	16
1967	Syracuse	8–2				12	12
1968	Syracuse	6–4					
1969	Syracuse	5–5					
1970	Syracuse	6–4					
1971	Syracuse	5–5–1					
1972	Syracuse	5–6					
1973	Syracuse	2–9					
Frank Maloney (Independent) (1974–1980)
1974	Syracuse	2–9					
1975	Syracuse	6–5					
1976	Syracuse	3–8					
1977	Syracuse	6–5					
1978	Syracuse	3–8					
1979	Syracuse	7–5			W Independence		
1980	Syracuse	5–6					
Dick MacPherson (Independent) (1981–1990)
1981	Syracuse	4–6–1					
1982	Syracuse	2–9					
1983	Syracuse	6–5					
1984	Syracuse	6–5					
1985	Syracuse	7–5			L Cherry		
1986	Syracuse	5–6					
1987	Syracuse	11–0–1			T Sugar	4	4
1988	Syracuse	10–2			W Hall of Fame	12	13
1989	Syracuse	8–4			W Peach		
1990	Syracuse	7–4–2			W Aloha	21	
Paul Pasqualoni (Big East Conference) (1991–2004)
1991	Syracuse	10–2	5–0	(Note: The Big East did not crown an official champion until 1993 when full league play began.)	W Hall of Fame	11	11
1992	Syracuse	10–2	6–1		W Fiesta^{†}	7	6
1993	Syracuse	6–4–1	3–4	5th			
1994	Syracuse	7–4	4–3	T–3rd			
1995	Syracuse	9–3	5–2	3rd	W Gator	16	19
1996	Syracuse	9–3	6–1	T–1st	W Liberty	19	21
1997	Syracuse	9–4	6–1	1st	L Fiesta^{†}	20	21
1998	Syracuse	8–4	6–1	1st	L Orange^{†}	24	25
1999	Syracuse	7–5	3–4	T–3rd	W Music City		
2000	Syracuse	6–5	4–3	T–3rd			
2001	Syracuse	10–3	6–1	2nd	W Insight.com	14	14
2002	Syracuse	4–8	2–5	T–6th			
2003	Syracuse	6–6	2–5	T–6th			
2004	Syracuse	6–6 (Note: Syracuse vacated 11 wins over the 2004, 2005, and 2006 seasons due to NCAA punishment for academic fraud.)	4–2	T–1st	L Champs Sports		
Greg Robinson (Big East) (2005–2008)
2005	Syracuse	1–10	0–7	8th			
2006	Syracuse	4–8	1–6	T–7th			
2007	Syracuse	2–10	1–6	8th			
2008	Syracuse	3–9	1–6	T–7th			
Doug Marrone (Big East) (2009–2012)
2009	Syracuse	4–8	1–6	T–7th			
2010	Syracuse	8–5	4–3	4th	W Pinstripe		
2011	Syracuse	5–7	1–6	T–7th			
2012	Syracuse	8–5	5–2	T–1st	W Pinstripe		
Scott Shafer (Atlantic Coast Conference) (2013–2015)
2013	Syracuse	7–6	4–4	T–3rd (Atlantic)	W Texas		
2014	Syracuse	3–9	1–7	T–6th (Atlantic)			
2015	Syracuse	4–8	2–6	5th (Atlantic)			
Dino Babers (Atlantic Coast Conference) (2016–2023)
2016	Syracuse	4–8	2–6	T–6th (Atlantic)			
2017	Syracuse	4–8	2–6	7th (Atlantic)			
2018	Syracuse	10–3	6–2	2nd (Atlantic)	W Camping World	15	15
2019	Syracuse	5–7	2–6	6th (Atlantic)			
2020	Syracuse	1–10	1–9	T–14th			
2021	Syracuse	5–7	2–6	T–6th (Atlantic)			
2022	Syracuse	7–6	4–4	T–2nd (Atlantic)	L Pinstripe		
2023	Syracuse	6–7‡	2–6	T-11th	L Boca Raton		
Fran Brown (Atlantic Coast Conference) (2024–present)
2024	Syracuse	10–3	5–3	T-4th	W Holiday	22	20
2025	Syracuse	3–9	1–7	T–Last			
Total:		756–589–49					
National championship Conference title Conference division title or championship game berth
^{†}Indicates Bowl Coalition, Bowl Alliance, BCS, or CFP / New Years' Six bowl.; ^{#}Rankings from final Coaches Poll.

‡Babers fired after 11 games. Nunzio Campanile coached the final game of the regular season and the Boca Raton Bowl
