= 1891 Orange Athletic Club football team =

American college football season

1891 Orange Athletic Club football
- Conference: American Football Union
- Record: 3–5 (1–1 AFU)
- Home stadium: Orange Oval

The 1891 Orange Athletic Club football team was an American football team that represented the Orange Athletic Club in the American Football Union (AFU) during the 1890 football season. The Orange team played its home games in East Orange, New Jersey, and compiled a 3–5 record (1–1 against AFU opponents).

== Schedule ==
Date	Time	Opponent	Site	Result	Attendance	Source
October 3		Springfield YMCA*	Orange Oval; Orange, NJ	L 0–16		
October 10		Rutgers*	Orange Oval; Orange, NJ	W 10–6		
October 17		Penn*	Orange Oval; Orange, NJ	L 0–26	1,000	
October 24	3:30 p.m.	Yale*	Orange Oval; Orange, NJ	L 0–36	2,700	
October 31		at New York Athletic Club	Polo Grounds; Manhattan, NY	W 10–0	1,000	
November 3		Princeton*	Orange Oval; Orange, NJ	L 0–26	3,500	
November 7		at Crescent Athletic Club	Eastern Park; Brooklyn, NY	L 0–28		
November 14		at Manhattan Athletic Club	Manhattan Field; New York, NY	Cancelled		
November 14		Staten Island Cricket Club*	Orange Oval; Orange, NJ	W 14–8		
*Non-conference game

== Second and junior team schedule ==
Date	Opponent	Site	Result
October 14	Columbia Seconds	Orange Oval; Orange, NJ	W 34–0
October 28	Adelphi Academy	Orange Oval; Orange, NJ	Unknown
October 31	Tabernacles of New Jersey		Cancelled
October 31	Stevens Seconds	Orange Oval; Orange, NJ	W 18–6
November 3	Berkeley Athletic Club	Orange Oval; Orange, NJ	T 6–6
November 6	Stevens Sophomores		Unknown
November 7	Bedford Athletic Club Seconds	Parade Grounds, Prospect Park; Brooklyn, NY	L 0–22
November 12	Stevens Freshmen	Hoboken, NJ	L 0–16
November 19	Alerts of Seton Hall	Orange Oval; Orange, Oval	W forfeit
