= Jacob Shell =

Jacob Shell may refer to:

- Jacob K. Shell, American college football player and coach
- Jacob Shell (geographer), American geographer
