= William Mackey =

William Mackey may refer to:

- William Mackey (Fenian) (1841–1884), member of the Fenian Brotherhood and the Clan na Gael
- William Mackey (Jesuit) (1915–1995), Canadian Jesuit educationist and founder of the modern educational system of Bhutan
- William F. Mackey (1858–1912), American lawyer and politician from New York
- William Davis Mackey (1913–?), American lawyer and politician from Indiana
- Bill Mackey (1927–1951), American racecar driver

== See also ==
- William Mackie (1799–1860), early Australian settler and judge
- William Mackie (geologist), Scottish geologist
- William C. Mackie, American college football player and coach
