= William McCracken =

American football coach and educator (1864–1940)

Biographical details
- Born: April 11, 1864; St. Louis, Missouri, U.S.
- Died: June 13, 1940 (aged 75–76); Kalamazoo, Michigan, U.S.

Playing career
- 1891–1892: Geneva
- 1894: Geneva
- Positions: Guard, tackle

Coaching career (HC unless noted)
- 1890–1896: Geneva
- 1904: Northern State Normal (MI)

Head coaching record
- Overall: 19–19–1

William C. McCracken (April 11, 1864 – June 13, 1940) was an American college football coach and educator. He served as the head football coach at Geneva College in Beaver Falls, Pennsylvania from 1890 to 1896 and Northern State Normal School—now known as Northern Michigan University–in Marquette, Michigan in 1904, compiling a career coaching record of 19–19–1. McCracken chaired the chemistry department at Western State Normal School—now known as Western Michigan University—in Kalamazoo, Michigan for many years, and served as the school's acting president in 1922–23.

== Early life and education ==
Born in St. Louis, McCracken attended Columbia University, the University of Michigan, and the University of Chicago.

== Coaching career ==
=== Geneva ===
McCracken was the first head football coach at Geneva College in Beaver Falls, Pennsylvania, serving for seven seasons, from 1890 to 1896, and compiling a record of 17–18–1. He also played on Geneva's teams of 1891, 1892, and 1894.

=== Northern Michigan ===
After starting the program at Geneva, McCracken went to the newly-formed Normal School of Northern Michigan—now known as now Northern Michigan University—in Marquette, Michigan to teach chemistry and physics. Records show that he was on staff at Normal as early as 1901.

In 1904, he was asked to start the program there, making the second school where he was the first coach. His team produced a record of 2–1 in the inaugural 1904 season and played their games at the County Fairgrounds.

== Education career ==
In 1907, McCracken took a position as head of the chemistry department at Western State Normal School—now known as Western Michigan University—in Kalamazoo, Michigan. He remained at Western Michigan until his retirement in 1939, also serving as acting university president for the 1922–23 school year. He was the first faculty advisor for the Western Herald student newspaper in 1916.

== Death and honors ==
McCracken died on June 13, 1940, at Borgess Hospital in Kalamazoo, following a two-week-long illness. In 1946, the school began plans for McCracken Hall to honor his legacy.

== Head coaching record ==
Year	Team	Overall	Conference	Standing	Bowl/playoffs
Geneva Covenanters (Independent) (1890–1896)
1890	Geneva	0–1			
1891	Geneva	4–2			
1892	Geneva	3–3			
1893	Geneva	2–2–1			
1894	Geneva	5–1			
1895	Geneva	0–5			
1896	Geneva	3–4			
Geneva:		17–18–1			
Northern State Normal (Independent) (1904)
1904	Northern State Normal	2–1			
Northern State Normal:		2–1			
Total:		19–19–1			
