= William Galbraith =

William Galbraith may refer to:

- William Galbraith (mathematician) (1786–1850), Scottish mathematician
- William Galbraith (athlete) (1885–1937), Canadian athlete at the 1908 Summer Olympics
- William Galbraith (American football), former head coach of the Syracuse college football program
- William Galbraith (gymnast) (1906–1994), American gymnast and Olympic medalist at the 1920 Summer Olympics
- William E. Galbraith (1926–2012), National Commander of the American Legion
- William Galbraith (British Army officer) (1837–1906), Adjutant-General in India
- William J. Galbraith (1837–1907), justice of the territorial Montana Supreme Court
