= John Pendleton (disambiguation) =

John Pendleton (1802–1868) was a congressman, diplomat, lawyer and farmer from Virginia.

John Pendleton may also refer to:

- John Pendleton Jr. (1749–1806), Virginia government official
- John O. Pendleton (1851–1916), U.S. Representative from West Virginia
- John C. B. Pendleton (1871–1938), American football coach and stock broker
- Jack J. Pendleton (1918–1944), United States Army soldier and Medal of Honor recipient
