= Jacob K. Shell =

American football player and coach (1862–1940)

Biographical details
- Born: February 14, 1862; Harrisburg, Pennsylvania, U.S.
- Died: December 10, 1940 (aged 78); Philadelphia, Pennsylvania, U.S.

Playing career
- 1878: Penn

Coaching career (HC unless noted)
- 1888–1898: Swarthmore
- 1899–1901: Illinois (assistant)

Administrative career (AD unless noted)
- 1898–1901: Illinois

Head coaching record
- Overall: 58–40–4

Jacob Kinzer Shell (February 14, 1862 — December 10, 1940) was an American college football player and coach. He served as the head football coach at Swarthmore College from 1888 to 1898, compiling a record of 58–40–4. Shell was the athletic director at the University of Illinois at Urbana–Champaign from 1888 to 1901. He was also a founder of the Amateur Athletic Union (AAU). Shell died on December 10, 1940, in Philadelphia.

== Head coaching record ==
Year	Team	Overall	Conference	Standing	Bowl/playoffs
Swarthmore Quakers (Independent) (1888–1890)
1888	Swarthmore	0–5			
1889	Swarthmore	2–5			
1890	Swarthmore	2–5			
Swarthmore Quakers (Pennsylvania Intercollegiate Football Association) (1891)
1891	Swarthmore	9–2	3–2	3rd	
Swarthmore Quakers (Independent) (1892–1898)
1892	Swarthmore	7–3			
1893	Swarthmore	6–2–1			
1894	Swarthmore	5–5			
1895	Swarthmore	7–4–1			
1896	Swarthmore	2–6			
1897	Swarthmore	7–3			
1898	Swarthmore	9–2			
Swarthmore:		58–40–4	3–2		
Total:		58–40–4			
