= 1891 Western University of Pennsylvania football team =

American college football season

1891 Western University of Pennsylvania football
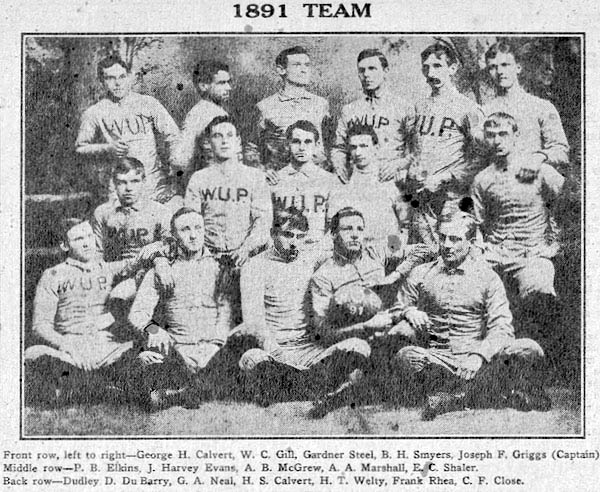
- Conference: Independent
- Record: 2–6
- Head coach: None
- Captain: Joseph Griggs

1891 Eastern college football independents records
| | Conf. | | | Overall |
| Team | W | L | T | W | | L | | T |
|---|---|---|---|---|---|---|---|---|
| Yale | | – | | 13 | – | 0 | – | 0 |
| Harvard | | – | | 13 | – | 1 | – | 0 |
| Princeton | | – | | 12 | – | 1 | – | 0 |
| Tufts | | – | | 7 | – | 1 | – | 0 |
| Penn | | – | | 11 | – | 2 | – | 0 |
| Colgate | | – | | 4 | – | 1 | – | 0 |
| Army | | – | | 4 | – | 1 | – | 1 |
| Bucknell | | – | | 6 | – | 2 | – | 1 |
| Navy | | – | | 5 | – | 2 | – | 0 |
| Cornell | | – | | 7 | – | 3 | – | 0 |
| Geneva | | – | | 4 | – | 2 | – | 0 |
| Washington & Jefferson | | – | | 4 | – | 2 | – | 0 |
| Lehigh | | – | | 7 | – | 4 | – | 0 |
| Rutgers | | – | | 8 | – | 6 | – | 0 |
| Brown | | – | | 4 | – | 6 | – | 0 |
| Springfield YMCA | | – | | 5 | – | 8 | – | 1 |
| Fordham | | – | | 1 | – | 2 | – | 1 |
| Syracuse | | – | | 4 | – | 7 | – | 0 |
| Massachusetts | | – | | 2 | – | 5 | – | 0 |
| Western Univ. Penn. | | – | | 2 | – | 6 | – | 0 |
| Lafayette | | – | | 2 | – | 9 | – | 1 |
| NYU | | – | | 1 | – | 4 | – | 0 |
| Columbia | | – | | 1 | – | 5 | – | 0 |
| Wesleyan | | – | | 1 | – | 6 | – | 0 |

The 1891 Western University of Pennsylvania football team was an American football team that represented the Western University of Pennsylvania (now known as the University of Pittsburgh) as an independent during the 1891 college football season.

== Schedule ==
| Date | Opponent | Site | Result | Source |
|---|---|---|---|---|
| September 26 | at East End Gymnastic Club | Liberty Park; Pittsburgh, PA | L 0–4 | |
| October 10 | at Washington & Jefferson | College Park; Washington, PA | L 6–40 | |
| October 17 | at Geneva | Beaver Falls, PA | W 6–0 | |
| October 24 | Western University of Pennsylvania Medical | Recreation Park; Allegheny, PA | W 54–0 | |
| October 31 | at Geneva | Beaver Falls, PA | L 4–12 | |
| November 7 | at East End Gymnastic Club | Liberty Park; Pittsburgh, PA | L 0–24 | |
| November 21 | Geneva | Liberty Park; Pittsburgh, PA | L 4–6 | |
| November 26 | at Indiana Normal | Indiana, PA | L 0–16 | |

== Season recap ==
The Western University of Pennsylvania played an eight-game schedule for its second season of intercollegiate football. Joseph Griggs was the team captain. The team compiled a 2–6 record and was outscored by a total of 102 to 74.

== Game summaries ==
=== At East End Gymnastic Club ===
WUP at East End Gymnastic Club

| Team | 1 | 2 | Total |
|---|---|---|---|
| WUP | 0 | 0 | 0 |
| • East End Gyms | 4 | 0 | 4 |

- Date: September 26, 1891
- Location: East End Grounds (Liberty Park), Pittsburgh
- Referee: O.D. Thompson

The opening game of the season was played as part of the East End Gymnastic Club sports field meeting. The meet opened with a track meet and bicycle race. WUP footballers W. Gill, Anson McGrew, Frank Rhea, and Dudley DuBarry competed in the track events. The football game between the Western University and East End eleven was the last attraction of the day. The East Enders won 4–0. The Pittsburgh Dispatch had the best recap:

"The football game was exciting, DuBarry doing well for the Western University. Procter and Martin did well for the Gyms, and Coates did good work also. Both teams showed lack of practice. The ladies enjoyed the game. O. D. Thomson acted ably as referee."

The WUP starting lineup for the East Ends game was Frank Rhea (center), Anson McGrew (right guard), George Neale (left guard), H. T. Welty (right tackle), Harry Calvert (left tackle), Harvey Evans (right end), Dudley DuBarry (left end), W. Gill (right halfback), Joseph Griggs (left halfback), Gardner Steele (fullback) and Bert Smyers (quarterback).

=== At Washington & Jefferson ===
WUP at Washington & Jefferson

| Team | 1 | 2 | Total |
|---|---|---|---|
| WUP | 6 | 0 | 6 |
| • W & J | 18 | 22 | 40 |

- Date: October 10, 1891
- Location: College Park, Washington, PA

The second game, on October 10, was a road trip to Washington, Pennsylvania to take on Washington & Jefferson. According to the Pittsburgh Press "The Washington and Jefferson boys had their own way and pushed their opponents all over the field. The score was 40 to 6 in Washington's favor." Washington & Jefferson scored a touchdown and goal after on their opening possession. WUP answered with a game tying drive that ended with Anson McGrew taking the ball in for the touchdown and the goal after was successful. They were the first points ever scored against Washington & Jefferson. But that was little consolation as Washington & Jefferson scored two more touchdowns and two goals in the first half and followed that with four more touchdowns and three goals in the second stanza.

The WUP starting lineup for the Washington & Jefferson game was Frank Rhea (center), Anson McGrew (right guard), George Neale (left guard), H. T. Welty (right tackle), Harry Calvert (left tackle), Harvey Evans (right end), Dudley DuBarry (left end), W. Gill (right halfback), Joseph Griggs (left halfback), Gardner Steele (fullback) and Bert Smyers (quarterback).

=== At Geneva ===
WUP at Geneva

| Team | 1 | 2 | Total |
|---|---|---|---|
| • WUP | 6 | 0 | 6 |
| Geneva | 0 | 0 | 0 |

- Date: October 17, 1891
- Location: Geneva Grounds, Beaver Falls, PA

The game Oct. 17, 1891 at Beaver Falls versus the Geneva Covenanters was decided in the first five minutes. William Gill scored a touchdown and Joseph Griggs added the goal after making it 6–0 in favor of the WUPs. The WUP contingent was outweighed but they kept the Covenanters out of the end zone. The ball carrying of Griggs and the kicking of Steele were the highlights of note for the Westerns.

=== Western Pennsylvania Medical College ===
West Penn Medical College at WUP

| Team | 1 | 2 | Total |
|---|---|---|---|
| West Penn Med. | 0 | 0 | 0 |
| • WUP | 28 | 26 | 54 |

- Date: October 24, 1891
- Location: Recreation Park, Pittsburgh
- Game attendance: 350

The Western Pennsylvania Medical College eleven were no match for the WUPs on Oct. 24 as they allowed the Universities to score eleven touchdowns and five kicks for goal. This was the second game for the Meds and their lack of fitness and game experience allowed the WUPs to run up the score. Halfback Gill was the leading ground gainer. The final tally read 54–0.

The WUP lineup for the game against the Western Penn. Medical College was Frank Rhea (center), Anson McGrew (right guard), Charles Close (left guard), George Neale (left tackle), Harry Calvert (right tackle), Harvey Evans (right end), Dudley DuBarry (left end), W. Gill (right halfback), Joseph Griggs (left halfback), Gardner Steele (fullback) and Bert Smyers (quarterback).

=== At Geneva ===
WUP at Geneva

| Team | 1 | 2 | Total |
|---|---|---|---|
| WUP | 4 | 0 | 4 |
| • Geneva | 6 | 6 | 12 |

- Date: October 31, 1891
- Location: Geneva Grounds, Beaver Falls, PA

On the second trip to Beaver Falls on Oct. 31, the Covenanters were victorious. The first half was evenly matched as Geneva scored a touchdown and kicked the goal after. The WUPs countered by also scoring a touchdown but they missed the goal kick. The halftime score read 6–4 in favor of the Covies. The weight advantage of the college men and a driving rain enabled the Geneva eleven to outscore the WUPs 6–0 in the second half for a final score of 12–4. The Universities lost three men to injury with Lineman A. B. McGrew's broken rib being the most crucial.

=== At East End Gymnastic Club ===
WUP at East End Gymnastic Club

| Team | 1 | 2 | Total |
|---|---|---|---|
| WUP | 0 | 0 | 0 |
| • East End Gyms | 14 | 10 | 24 |

- Date: November 7, 1891
- Location: East End Grounds (Liberty Park), Pittsburgh
- Referee: Griggs

On November 7, the Western University played the East End Gymnastic Club team at Liberty Park in a rematch of the opening game of the season. This time the Gyms showed why they were considered one of the premier football clubs in western Pennsylvania. The Gyms took the opening possession and Proctor scored a touchdown on the fifth play of the game. The try for goal kick after failed. With the WUPs in possession, Neale gained 25 yards, but the drive stalled and the East End offense took over. They scored another touchdown and missed the kick. The WUP offense advanced the ball with short runs by Rhea, Gill and Calvert to midfield but lost the ball on downs. The East End offense succeeded in scoring again and the goal kick was successful making the halftime score 14–0.

The second half mirrored the first as the WUPs offense was able to move the ball at times but would eventually stall and the East End offense would capitalize on every opportunity. Proctor, Kirchner and Martin were the stars for the Gyms, while DuBarry, Neale and Steele played well for the WUPs. The final score was 24–0 in favor of the Gyms.

The WUP lineup for the game against East End Gymnasium was Frank Rhea (center), Anson McGrew (right guard), Charles Close (left guard), George Neale (left tackle), Harry Calvert (right tackle), Harvey Evans (right end), Dudley DuBarry (left end), W. Gill (right halfback), George Calvert (left halfback), Gardner Steele (fullback) and Bert Smyers (quarterback). Frank Rhea was injured and replaced by H.T. Welty at center.

=== Geneva ===
Geneva at WUP

| Team | 1 | 2 | Total |
|---|---|---|---|
| • Geneva | 0 | 6 | 6 |
| WUP | 0 | 4 | 4 |

- Date: November 21, 1891
- Location: East End Grounds (Liberty Park), Pittsburgh
- Referee: Prof. Kirchner (East End Gyms)

On November 21, the third game of the season between the WUPs and Geneva College took place on the East End Gymnastic grounds. The rubber match was hotly contested and a dispute took center stage. The WUPs traded possessions with Geneva early in the first half and then Gill assumed he had made a touchdown for WUP. However, the referee claimed Gill was out of bounds. An argument ensued and the disgruntled Westerns returned to the field of play. The defenses of both teams played well as neither team was able to score before halftime.

Sterrett of Geneva scored a touchdown early in the second half and the goal kick after was successful. With ninety seconds remaining the University boys drove the ball deep into Geneva territory and with a final push scored a touchdown. The goal kick after failed and Geneva won 6–4.

The WUP lineup for the Geneva game was Frank Rhea (left guard), Anson McGrew (right guard), H.T. Welty (center), George Neale (left tackle), Harry Calvert (right tackle), Harvey Evans (right end), Dudley DuBarry (left end), W. Gill (right halfback), Joseph Griggs (left halfback), Gardner Steele (fullback) and Bert Smyers (quarterback).

=== At Indiana Normal ===
The Western University of Pennsylvania closed its second season of football in Indiana, Pennsylvania against the eleven of the Indiana Normal School on Thanksgiving Day. Fiscus, the halfback for Normal, was the star of the day as he scored three touchdowns to lead the Normal School to a 16–0 victory. Heusel also scored a touchdown. The Western University of Pennsylvania football team finished the season with a 2–6 record.

== Roster ==
The roster of the 1891 Western University of Football team:

- Dr. Joseph F. Griggs, Jr. (captain/halfback) graduated with a Bachelor of Arts degree in 1892 and his master's degree in 1895. His father was a professor of ancient languages at the university for some years. He resided in Tacoma, Washington. He later became a physician whose career included the charge of a Presbyterian hospital in Peking, China.
- Abner A. Marshall (sub) received his Bachelor of Philosophy degree in 1894.
- George H. Calvert (fullback) graduated with a degree in civil engineering in 1893 and later studied law, earning his L.L.B. in 1897. He practiced law in Pittsburgh.
- W. C. Gill (halfback ) was also a sprinter and held the 440 record (51 seconds) for some years. He graduated in 1893 with a Bachelor of Arts degree and earned his master's degree in 1896. He obtained his law degree and settled in Pittsburgh.
- Gardner Steel (halfback) attended school three years but did not graduate. He was a sprinter and co-held the 100 yd dash record of 10.5 seconds until 1915. He was a successful oil operator and made a fortune in the Southwestern fields.
- Bert H. Smyers (quarterback), the co-founder of WUP football, graduated in 1893 with a Bachelor of Arts degree. By 1917 he was the vice president of the Pittsburgh Trust Company, treasurer of the General Alumni Association and a member of the Athletic Council. He later practiced law in Pittsburgh.
- Port B. Elkins (end) received his Associate College degree in 1895.
- J. Harvey Evans (end) received his Engineering degree in 1895. He was the Assistant Treasurer of the Union Trust Company in Pittsburgh.
- Anson B. McGrew (guard) graduated with a degree in civil engineering in 1892. He worked for the U.S. Government Corps of Engineers.
- Edward C. Shaler (sub) graduated with a degree in civil engineering in 1893. He worked for the Brooklyn Rapid Transit Company in Brooklyn, New York.
- Dudley D. DuBarry (end) graduated with an associate engineering degree in 1895. He also played on the 1890 team and part of the State College game in 1893. He worked for the American Steel and Wire Company in Pittsburgh.
- George A. Neale (guard) received his associate college degree in 1895.
- Harry S. Calvert (tackle) received his Bachelor of Arts degree in 1893 and his master's degree in 1895. He was the president of the Elyria Enameled Products Company of Pittsburgh.
- H. T. Welty (tackle) attended the School of Engineering in 1891.
- Frank Rhea (guard) received his civil engineering degree in 1892. He worked for the Interstate Commerce Commission in Washington, D.C.
- Charles F. Close (guard) received his associate college degree in 1895. He was also the best pole vaulter in the district while at WUP. He worked for the Dauler Close Furniture Company in Pittsburgh.
