= 1891 Crescent Athletic Club football team =

American college football season

1891 Crescent Athletic Club football

AFU champion
- Conference: American Football Union
- Record: 5–3 (3–0 AFU)
- Captain: Harry Beecher
- Home stadium: Eastern Park

The 1891 Crescent Athletic Club football team was an American football team that represented the Crescent Athletic Club in the American Football Union (AFU) during the 1891 college football season. The team played its home games at Eastern Park in Brooklyn, compiled a 5–3 record (3–0 against AFU opponents), and won the AFU championship. Two of the team's losses were to Walter Camp's undefeated 1891 Yale team that did not allow its opponents to score a single point. Harry Beecher, who played for Yale from 1884 to 1887, was the Crescent team's quarterback and captain.

== Schedule ==
Date	Opponent	Site	Result	Attendance	Source
October 3	Yale*	Eastern Park; Brooklyn, NY	L 0–26	3,000	
October 10	Princeton*	Eastern Park; Brooklyn, NY	L 0–28	3,000	
October 17	Columbia*	Eastern Park; Brooklyn, NY	W 42–0		
October 24	Wesleyan*	Eastern Park; Brooklyn, NY	W 30–6		
October 31	Manhattan Athletic Club	Eastern Park; Brooklyn, NY	W 10–0	3,000	
November 3	at Yale*	Yale Field; New Haven, CT	L 0–70	5,600	
November 7	Orange Athletic Club	Eastern Park; Brooklyn, NY	W 28–0		
November 14	at New York Athletic Club	Polo Grounds; New York, NY	W 18–6		
*Non-conference game
