= 1891 Manhattan Athletic Club football team =

American college football season

1891 Manhattan Athletic Club football
- Conference: American Football Union
- Record: – (– AFU)
- Captain: Hugh Janeway
- Home stadium: Manhattan Field

The 1891 Manhattan Athletic Club football team was an American football team that represented the Manhattan Athletic Club (MAC) in the American Football Union (AFU) during the 1891 college football season. Former Princeton player Hugh Janeway was the team captain.

Before the season began, MAC signed some of the best football players in the country, including former Princeton stars Snake Ames and Sport Donnelly. One newspaper wrote: "Never before was an amateur athletic organization able to get together such a crack eleven as the Manhattans turned out this fall, and some football authorities even went so far as to predict that, with a little practice, it woulld beat any team in the country." However, the AFU adopted a rule on the day before the opening game prohibiting MAC's best players (including Ames and Donnelly) from playing because they did not live within 100 miles of the club they represented. According to a newspaper account, the new rule was adopted by MAC's opponents and "apparently was designed expressly to prevent Ames and Donnelly from playing with the Manhattans." MAC withdrew from the AFU in protest of the ruling.

A further controversy arose in late November 1891 as to whether MAC should be deemed a professional club for hosting a game between Yale and Princeton that generated receipts of $50,000.

== Schedule ==
Date	Time	Opponent	Site	Result	Attendance	Source
October 14	4:30 p.m.	at Columbia	Columbia Grounds; Bronx, NY	W 28–0		
October 24		at Schuylkill Navy	Philadelphia, PA	L 0–22		
October 28		at Princeton	University Field; Princeton, NJ	L 0–78		
October 31		at Crescent Athletic Club	Eastern Park; Brooklyn, NY	L 0–10	3,000	
November 3		Princeton picked team	Manhattan Field; Manhattan, NY	W 62–8	700	
November 7	3:15 p.m.	New York Athletic Club	Manhattan Field; Manhattan, NY	W 12–0	1,000	
November 14		Orange Athletic Club	Manhattan Field; Manhattan, NY	Cancelled		
November 24		at Rutgers	New Brunswick, NJ	L 0–34		
