= 1891 Rutgers Queensmen football team =

American college football season

1891 Rutgers Queensmen football
- Conference: Independent
- Record: 8–6
- Head coach: John C. B. Pendleton (1st season)
- Captain: Philip Milledoler Brett
- Home stadium: Neilson Field

1891 Eastern college football independents records
	Conf.			Overall
Team	W	L	T	W		L		T
Yale		–		13	–	0	–	0
Harvard		–		13	–	1	–	0
Princeton		–		12	–	1	–	0
Tufts		–		7	–	1	–	0
Penn		–		11	–	2	–	0
Colgate		–		4	–	1	–	0
Army		–		4	–	1	–	1
Bucknell		–		6	–	2	–	1
Navy		–		5	–	2	–	0
Cornell		–		7	–	3	–	0
Geneva		–		4	–	2	–	0
Washington & Jefferson		–		4	–	2	–	0
Lehigh		–		7	–	4	–	0
Rutgers		–		8	–	6	–	0
Brown		–		4	–	6	–	0
Springfield YMCA		–		5	–	8	–	1
Fordham		–		1	–	2	–	1
Syracuse		–		4	–	7	–	0
Massachusetts		–		2	–	5	–	0
Western Univ. Penn.		–		2	–	6	–	0
Lafayette		–		2	–	9	–	1
NYU		–		1	–	4	–	0
Columbia		–		1	–	5	–	0
Wesleyan		–		1	–	6	–	0

The 1891 Rutgers Queensmen football team represented Rutgers University as an independent during the 1891 college football season. In their first year under head coach John C. B. Pendleton, the Queensmen compiled an 8–6 record and outscored their opponents, 265 to 137. The team's captain was Philip Milledoler Brett, who later served as Rutgers University president.

== Schedule ==
Date	Opponent	Site	Result	Attendance	Source
October 3	at Princeton	Princeton, NJ (rivalry)	L 0–12		
October 10	at Orange Athletic Club	Orange Oval; East Orange, NJ	L 6–10		
October 13	at Schuylkill Navy Athletic Club	Philadelphia, PA	W 24–0		
October 17	at Lehigh	Bethlehem, PA	L 0–22	1,000	
October 21	at Penn	University Athletic Grounds; Philadelphia, PA	L 6–32	500	
October 24	Stevens	New Brunswick, NJ	W 12–10	1,250	
October 28	Columbia	New Brunswick, NJ	W 44–0		
October 31	at Navy	Annapolis, MD	L 12–20		
November 2	at Columbia Athletic Club	Columbia Park; Washington, DC	W 4–0		
November 3	at New York Athletic Club	New York, NY	L 12–21		
November 7	NYU	New Brunswick, NJ	W 70–4		
November 14	at Army	The Plain; West Point, NY	W 27–6		
November 18	New York Law School	New Brunswick, NJ	W 14–0		
November 24	Manhattan Athletic Club	New Brunswick, NJ	W 34–0		
