= 1891 Penn State football team =

American college football season

1891 Penn State football
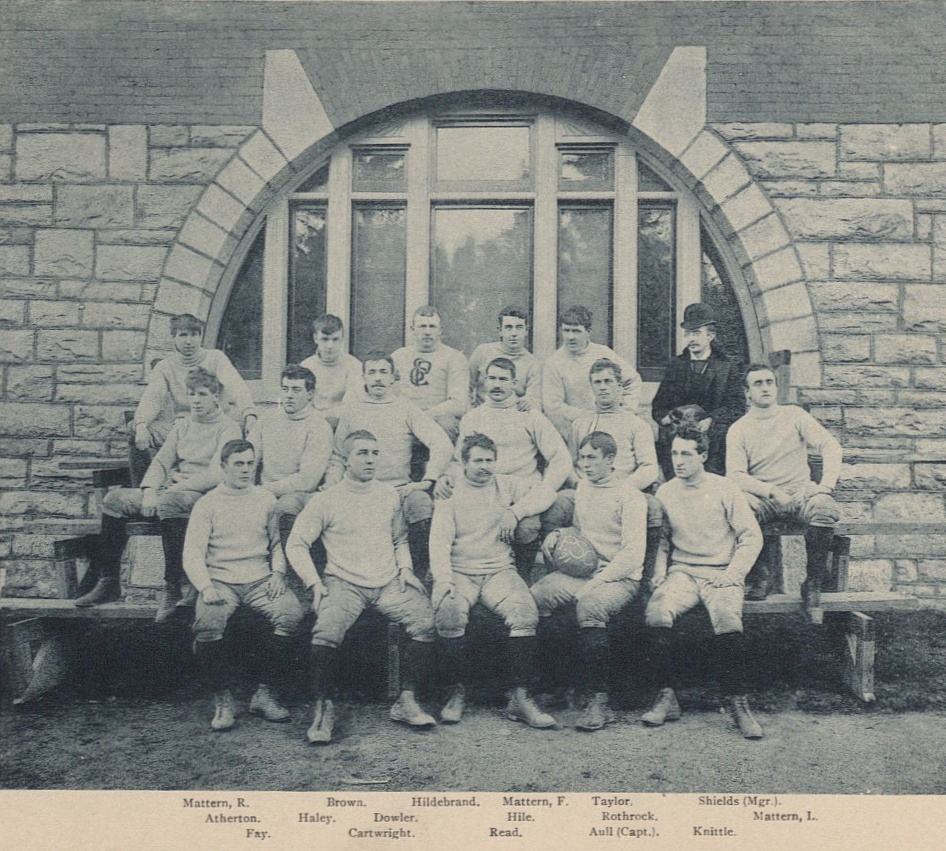
- Conference: Pennsylvania Intercollegiate Football Association
- Record: 6–2 (4–1 PIFA)
- Head coach: None
- Captain: Charles Aull
- Home stadium: Old Main lawn

1891 Pennsylvania Intercollegiate Football Association standings
| | Conf. | | | | | Overall |
| Team | W | | L | | T | W | | L | | T |
|---|---|---|---|---|---|---|---|---|---|---|
| Penn State $ | 4 | – | 1 | – | 0 | 6 | – | 2 | – | 0 |
| Bucknell | 3 | – | 1 | – | 1 | 6 | – | 2 | – | 1 |
| Swarthmore | 3 | – | 2 | – | 0 | 9 | – | 2 | – | 0 |
| Franklin & Marshall | 2 | – | 2 | – | 0 | 2 | – | 4 | – | 0 |
| Dickinson | 1 | – | 2 | – | 1 | 2 | – | 3 | – | 1 |
| Haverford | 0 | – | 5 | – | 0 | 0 | – | 6 | – | 0 |
$ – Conference champion

The 1891 Penn State football team was an American football team that represented Pennsylvania State College—now known as Pennsylvania State University–as a member of the Pennsylvania Intercollegiate Football Association (PIFA) during the 1891 college football season. The team played its home games on the Old Main Lawn in University Park, Pennsylvania.

== Schedule ==
| Date | Opponent | Site | Result | Attendance | Source |
|---|---|---|---|---|---|
| October 2 | at Lafayette* | March Field; Easton, PA | W 14–4 | | |
| October 3 | at Lehigh* | Bethlehem, PA | L 2–24 | | |
| October 17 | at Swarthmore | Swarthmore, PA | W 44–0 | | |
| October 24 | at Franklin & Marshall | Lancaster, PA | W 26–6 | | |
| October 27 | at Gettysburg* | Gettysburg, PA | W 18–0 | | |
| November 7 | at Bucknell | Lewisburg, PA | L 10–12 | 1,000 | |
| November 26 | Dickinson | Altoona, PA | W forfeit | | |
| December 5 | at Haverford | Haverford, PA | W 58–0 | | |
*Non-conference game
