= 1891 Washington & Jefferson football team =

American college football season

1891 Washington & Jefferson football
- Conference: Independent
- Record: 4–2
- Head coach: R. LeBlanc Lynch (2nd season)
- Home stadium: College Park

1891 Eastern college football independents records
	Conf.			Overall
Team	W	L	T	W		L		T
Yale		–		13	–	0	–	0
Harvard		–		13	–	1	–	0
Princeton		–		12	–	1	–	0
Tufts		–		7	–	1	–	0
Penn		–		11	–	2	–	0
Colgate		–		4	–	1	–	0
Army		–		4	–	1	–	1
Bucknell		–		6	–	2	–	1
Navy		–		5	–	2	–	0
Cornell		–		7	–	3	–	0
Geneva		–		4	–	2	–	0
Washington & Jefferson		–		4	–	2	–	0
Lehigh		–		7	–	4	–	0
Rutgers		–		8	–	6	–	0
Brown		–		4	–	6	–	0
Springfield YMCA		–		5	–	8	–	1
Fordham		–		1	–	2	–	1
Syracuse		–		4	–	7	–	0
Massachusetts		–		2	–	5	–	0
Western Univ. Penn.		–		2	–	6	–	0
Lafayette		–		2	–	9	–	1
NYU		–		1	–	4	–	0
Columbia		–		1	–	5	–	0
Wesleyan		–		1	–	6	–	0

The 1891 Washington & Jefferson football team was an American football team that represented Washington & Jefferson College as an independent during the 1891 college football season. Led by R. LeBlanc Lynch in his second and final year as head coach, the team compiled a record of 4–2.

== Schedule ==
Date	Opponent	Site	Result	Attendance	Source
October 10	Western University of Pennsylvania	College Park; Washington, PA	W 40–6		
October 24	Geneva	College Park; Washington, PA	W 26–8		
October 31	at East End Gymnastic Club	East End Park; Pittsburgh, PA	L 0–14	500	
November 14	at Allegheny Athletic Association	Exposition Park; Allegheny, PA	L 4–8	600	
November 21	Western University of Pennsylvania Medical	College Park; Washington, PA	W 50–0		
November 28	at West Virginia	Show Lot; Morgantown, WV	W 72–0	250	
