= 1891 Lafayette football team =

American college football season

1891 Lafayette football
- Conference: Independent
- Record: 2–9–1
- Head coach: Wallace Moyle (1st season)
- Captain: Moncure March
- Home stadium: The Quad

1891 Eastern college football independents records
	Conf.			Overall
Team	W	L	T	W		L		T
Yale		–		13	–	0	–	0
Harvard		–		13	–	1	–	0
Princeton		–		12	–	1	–	0
Tufts		–		7	–	1	–	0
Penn		–		11	–	2	–	0
Colgate		–		4	–	1	–	0
Army		–		4	–	1	–	1
Bucknell		–		6	–	2	–	1
Navy		–		5	–	2	–	0
Cornell		–		7	–	3	–	0
Geneva		–		4	–	2	–	0
Washington & Jefferson		–		4	–	2	–	0
Lehigh		–		7	–	4	–	0
Rutgers		–		8	–	6	–	0
Brown		–		4	–	6	–	0
Springfield YMCA		–		5	–	8	–	1
Fordham		–		1	–	2	–	1
Syracuse		–		4	–	7	–	0
Massachusetts		–		2	–	5	–	0
Western Univ. Penn.		–		2	–	6	–	0
Lafayette		–		2	–	9	–	1
NYU		–		1	–	4	–	0
Columbia		–		1	–	5	–	0
Wesleyan		–		1	–	6	–	0

The 1891 Lafayette football team was an American football team that represented Lafayette College as an independent during the 1891 college football season. In its first year under head coach Wallace Moyle, the team compiled a 2–9–1 record and was outscored by a total of 161 to 86. Moncure March was the team captain. The team played its home games on The Quad in Easton, Pennsylvania.

== Schedule ==
Date	Opponent	Site	Result	Attendance	Source
September 25	Bucknell	The Quad; Easton, PA	L 10–16		
October 2	Penn State	The Quad; Easton, PA	L 4–14		
October 14	at Haverford	Haverford, PA	W 38–0		
October 20	Princeton	The Quad; Easton, PA	L 0–24		
October 24	at Cornell	Ithaca, NY	L 0–30		
October 28	at Penn	University Athletic Grounds; Philadelphia, PA	L 6–15	500	
November 4	at Lehigh	Bethlehem, PA (rivalry)	L 4–22		
November 11	Lehigh	The Quad; Easton, PA	L 2–6	1,500	
November 18	Penn	The Quad; Easton, PA	L 10–12		
November 20	at Virginia	Madison Hall Field; Charlottesville, VA	T 6–6		
November 21	at Navy	Worden Field; Annapolis, MD	W 4–0		
November 25	vs. Lehigh	Wilkes-Barre, PA	L 2–16		
