= 1896 Swarthmore Quakers football team =

American college football season

1896 Swarthmore Quakers football
- Conference: Independent
- Record: 2–6
- Head coach: Jacob K. Shell (9th season)
- Captain: Hodge
- Home stadium: Whittier Field

1896 Eastern college football independents records
	Conf.			Overall
Team	W	L	T	W		L		T
Fordham		–		1	–	0	–	0
Lafayette		–		11	–	0	–	1
Princeton		–		10	–	0	–	1
Washington & Jefferson		–		8	–	0	–	1
Penn		–		14	–	1	–	0
Yale		–		13	–	1	–	0
Pittsburgh College		–		11	–	2	–	0
Buffalo		–		9	–	1	–	2
Villanova		–		10	–	4	–	0
Bucknell		–		5	–	2	–	1
Harvard		–		7	–	4	–	0
Boston College		–		5	–	3	–	0
Storrs		–		5	–	3	–	0
Cornell		–		5	–	3	–	1
Syracuse		–		5	–	3	–	2
Temple		–		3	–	2	–	0
Army		–		3	–	2	–	1
Rutgers		–		6	–	6	–	0
Carlisle		–		5	–	5	–	0
Holy Cross		–		2	–	2	–	2
Brown		–		4	–	5	–	1
Wesleyan		–		4	–	5	–	1
Dickinson		–		4	–	5	–	0
Franklin & Marshall		–		3	–	4	–	2
Geneva		–		3	–	4	–	0
Penn State		–		3	–	4	–	0
Colgate		–		3	–	4	–	1
Amherst		–		3	–	6	–	1
Western Univ. Penn.		–		3	–	6	–	0
Lehigh		–		2	–	5	–	0
Tufts		–		2	–	6	–	1
Swarthmore		–		2	–	6	–	0
New Hampshire		–		1	–	4	–	0
Drexel		–		1	–	5	–	0
Massachusetts		–		0	–	4	–	0
Rhode Island		–		0	–	4	–	0

The 1896 Swarthmore Quakers football team was an American football team that represented Swarthmore College as an independent during the 1896 college football season. The team compiled a 2–6 record and was outscored by a total of 110 to 76. Jacob K. Shell was the head coach. Hodge was the captain and quarterback.

== Schedule ==
Date	Opponent	Site	Result	Source
September 30	Villanova	Whittier Field; Swarthmore, PA	L 0–16	
October 17	Delaware State	Whittier Field; Swarthmore, PA	W 44–0	
October 21	at Villanova	Villanova, PA	L 0–10	
October 24	Rutgers	Whittier Field; Swarthmore, PA	L 10–16	
October 31	vs. Gettysburg	Harrisburg, PA	L 4–12	
November 7	Franklin & Marshall	Whittier Field; Swarthmore, PA	L 0–10	
November 11	Pennsylvania Military	Whittier Field; Swarthmore, PA	W 12–6	
November 18	Haverford	Whittier Field; Swarthmore, PA (rivalry)	L 6–42	
