= 1891 Dartmouth football team =

American college football season

1891 Dartmouth football
- Conference: Eastern Intercollegiate Football Association
- Record: 2–2–1 (2–1–1 EIFA)
- Head coach: None
- Captain: Frank Lakeman

1891 Eastern Intercollegiate Football Association standings
| | Conf. | | | | | Overall |
| Team | W | | L | | T | W | | L | | T |
|---|---|---|---|---|---|---|---|---|---|---|
| Williams $ | 3 | – | 0 | – | 1 | 8 | – | 2 | – | 1 |
| Amherst | 2 | – | 0 | – | 2 | 8 | – | 4 | – | 3 |
| Dartmouth | 2 | – | 1 | – | 1 | 2 | – | 2 | – | 1 |
| Boston Tech | 1 | – | 3 | – | 0 | 5 | – | 7 | – | 2 |
| Stevens | 0 | – | 4 | – | 0 | 3 | – | 7 | – | 0 |
$ – Conference champion

The 1891 Dartmouth football team represented Dartmouth College as a member of the Eastern Intercollegiate Football Association (EIFA) during the 1891 college football season. Dartmouth compiled an overall record of 2–2–1 with a mark of 2–1–1 in conference play, placing third in the EIFA.

== Schedule ==
| Date | Time | Opponent | Site | Result | Attendance | Source |
|---|---|---|---|---|---|---|
| October 3 | 3:45 p.m. | at Harvard* | Jarvis Field; Cambridge, MA (rivalry) | L 0–16 | | |
| November 4 | | at Stevens | St. George's Cricket Club grounds; Hoboken, NJ | W 32–12 | 1,000 | |
| November 7 | 3:30 p.m. | Amherst | Hanover, NH | T 14–14 | 800 | |
| November 14 | 2:30 p.m. | Williams | Hanover, NH | L 6–14 | 700 | |
| November 20 | 2:45 p.m. | at Boston Tech | Congress Street Grounds; Boston, MA | W 8–6 | 300 | |
*Non-conference game
