= 1891 Penn Quakers football team =

American college football season

1891 Penn Quakers football
- Conference: Independent
- Record: 11–2
- Head coach: Woody Wagenhorst (4th season)
- Captain: Edgar M. Church
- Home stadium: University Athletic Grounds

1891 Eastern college football independents records
	Conf.			Overall
Team	W	L	T	W		L		T
Yale		–		13	–	0	–	0
Harvard		–		13	–	1	–	0
Princeton		–		12	–	1	–	0
Tufts		–		7	–	1	–	0
Penn		–		11	–	2	–	0
Colgate		–		4	–	1	–	0
Army		–		4	–	1	–	1
Bucknell		–		6	–	2	–	1
Navy		–		5	–	2	–	0
Cornell		–		7	–	3	–	0
Geneva		–		4	–	2	–	0
Washington & Jefferson		–		4	–	2	–	0
Lehigh		–		7	–	4	–	0
Rutgers		–		8	–	6	–	0
Brown		–		4	–	6	–	0
Springfield YMCA		–		5	–	8	–	1
Fordham		–		1	–	2	–	1
Syracuse		–		4	–	7	–	0
Massachusetts		–		2	–	5	–	0
Western Univ. Penn.		–		2	–	6	–	0
Lafayette		–		2	–	9	–	1
NYU		–		1	–	4	–	0
Columbia		–		1	–	5	–	0
Wesleyan		–		1	–	6	–	0

The 1891 Penn Quakers football team represented the University of Pennsylvania in the 1891 college football season. The Quakers finished with an 11–2 record in their fourth year under head coach E. O. Wagenhorst. Significant games included victories over Rutgers (32–6), Lafayette (15–6 and 12–10), and Lehigh (42–0 and 32–0), and losses to Princeton (24–0) and undefeated national champion Yale (48–0). The 1891 Penn team outscored its opponents by a combined total of 267 to 109. Penn center John Adams was selected by Caspar Whitney as a first-team player on the 1891 College Football All-America Team. 1891 was last year John Heisman played for Penn.

== Schedule ==
Date	Opponent	Site	Result	Attendance	Source
October 3	Penn graduates	University Athletic Grounds; Philadelphia PA	T 4–4	400	
October 8	Schuylkill Navy	University Athletic Grounds; Philadelphia, PA	W 24–0		
October 10	Haverford	University Athletic Grounds; Philadelphia, PA	W 34–0		
October 17	at Orange Athletic Club	Orange Oval; Orange, NJ	W 26–0	1,000	
October 21	Rutgers	University Athletic Grounds; Philadelphia, PA	W 32–6	500	
October 24	at Lehigh	Bethlehem, PA	W 42–0	2,000	
October 28	Lafayette	University Athletic Grounds; Philadelphia, PA	W 15–6	500	
October 31	Trinity (CT)	University Athletic Grounds; Philadelphia, PA	W 28–5	1,500	
November 7	Princeton	Germantown Cricket Club; Philadelphia, PA (rivalry)	L 0–24	12,000	
November 14	vs. Yale	Manhattan Field; New York, NY	L 0–48	5,000	
November 18	at Lafayette	Easton, PA	W 12–10		
November 21	Lehigh	Philadelphia, PA	W 32–0		
November 25	vs. Wesleyan	Manhattan Field; New York, NY	W 18–10	2,500	
