= 1891 Army Cadets football team =

American college football season

1891 Army Cadets football
- Conference: Independent
- Record: 4–1–1
- Head coach: Henry L. Williams (1st season)
- Captain: Dennis Michie
- Home stadium: The Plain

1891 Eastern college football independents records
	Conf.			Overall
Team	W	L	T	W		L		T
Yale		–		13	–	0	–	0
Harvard		–		13	–	1	–	0
Princeton		–		12	–	1	–	0
Tufts		–		7	–	1	–	0
Penn		–		11	–	2	–	0
Colgate		–		4	–	1	–	0
Army		–		4	–	1	–	1
Bucknell		–		6	–	2	–	1
Navy		–		5	–	2	–	0
Cornell		–		7	–	3	–	0
Geneva		–		4	–	2	–	0
Washington & Jefferson		–		4	–	2	–	0
Lehigh		–		7	–	4	–	0
Rutgers		–		8	–	6	–	0
Brown		–		4	–	6	–	0
Springfield YMCA		–		5	–	8	–	1
Fordham		–		1	–	2	–	1
Syracuse		–		4	–	7	–	0
Massachusetts		–		2	–	5	–	0
Western Univ. Penn.		–		2	–	6	–	0
Lafayette		–		2	–	9	–	1
NYU		–		1	–	4	–	0
Columbia		–		1	–	5	–	0
Wesleyan		–		1	–	6	–	0

The 1891 Army Cadets football team represented the United States Military Academy as an independent during the 1891 college football season. In the first full season of Army football (Army had played a single game in 1890), the Cadets compiled a 4–1–1 record and outscored their opponents by a combined total of 80 to 73. The Cadets opened the season with a 10–6 victory over Fordham, the team's first-ever win. In the final game of the season, the Cadets defeated the Midshipmen by 32–16 in the second annual Army–Navy Game.

Army's head coach in 1891 was 22-year-old Henry L. Williams, who had played football at Yale. Williams remained at the academy only one year. He later served as head coach at Minnesota for 22 years and was inducted into the College Football Hall of Fame.

No Army Cadets were honored on the 1891 College Football All-America Team.

== Schedule ==
Date	Opponent	Site	Result	Attendance	Source
October 24	Fordham	The Plain; West Point, NY	W 10–6		
October 31	Princeton "B" team	The Plain; West Point, NY	T 12–12		
November 7	Stevens	The Plain; West Point, NY	W 14–12	1,000	
November 14	Rutgers	The Plain; West Point, NY	L 6–27		
November 21	Schuylkill Navy AC	The Plain; West Point, NY	W 6–0		
November 28	at Navy	Worden Field; Annapolis, MD (Army–Navy Game)	W 32–16		

== Players ==
- Harry H. Pattison
- Sterling P. Adams, center
- Butler Ames
- Elmer W. Clark, right guard
- Peter W. Davidson, left halfback
- Willard E. Gleason, left guard
- George E. Houle, left tackle
- Dennis Michie, fullback
- James T. Moore, left end
- Leonard M. Prince, right end
- Fine W. Smith, right tackle
- Edward J. Timberlake, right halfback
- Kirby Walker, quarterback
- Frank A. Wilcox
