= 1891 Harvard Crimson football team =

American college football season

1891 Harvard Crimson football
- Conference: Independent
- Record: 13–1
- Head coach: George A. Stewart & George C. Adams (2nd season)
- Captain: Bernard Trafford
- Home stadium: Jarvis Field

1891 Eastern college football independents records
	Conf.			Overall
Team	W	L	T	W		L		T
Yale		–		13	–	0	–	0
Harvard		–		13	–	1	–	0
Princeton		–		12	–	1	–	0
Tufts		–		7	–	1	–	0
Penn		–		11	–	2	–	0
Colgate		–		4	–	1	–	0
Army		–		4	–	1	–	1
Bucknell		–		6	–	2	–	1
Navy		–		5	–	2	–	0
Cornell		–		7	–	3	–	0
Geneva		–		4	–	2	–	0
Washington & Jefferson		–		4	–	2	–	0
Lehigh		–		7	–	4	–	0
Rutgers		–		8	–	6	–	0
Brown		–		4	–	6	–	0
Springfield YMCA		–		5	–	8	–	1
Fordham		–		1	–	2	–	1
Syracuse		–		4	–	7	–	0
Massachusetts		–		2	–	5	–	0
Western Univ. Penn.		–		2	–	6	–	0
Lafayette		–		2	–	9	–	1
NYU		–		1	–	4	–	0
Columbia		–		1	–	5	–	0
Wesleyan		–		1	–	6	–	0

The 1891 Harvard Crimson football team represented Harvard University as an independent during the 1891 college football season. The Crimson finished the season with a 13–1 record. The team won its first 13 games by a combined score of 588–22, but lost its final game against Yale, 10–0.

== Schedule ==
Date	Time	Opponent	Site	Result	Attendance	Source
October 3	3:45 p.m.	Dartmouth	Jarvis Field; Cambridge, MA (rivalry)	W 16–0		
October 7		Phillips Exeter	Jarvis Field; Cambridge, MA	W 17–0	400	
October 10		Amherst	Jarvis Field; Cambridge, MA	W 18–0	3,500	
October 14		Boston Tech	Jarvis Field; Cambridge, MA	W 26–0	3,500	
October 17		Williams	Jarvis Field; Cambridge, MA	W 26–6	3,500	
October 21		at Phillips Academy	Andover, MA	W 76–0	800	
October 24		Amherst	Jarvis Field; Cambridge, MA	W 39–0	800	
October 28		Bowdoin	Jarvis Field; Cambridge, MA	W 79–0		
October 31		Springfield YMCA	Jarvis Field; Cambridge, MA	W 34–0	2,500–3,000	
November 3		Wesleyan	Jarvis Field; Cambridge, MA	W 124–0	1,000	
November 7		Springfield YMCA	Jarvis Field; Cambridge, MA	W 44–4	1,500	
November 11		vs. Trinity (CT)	Hampden Park; Springfield, MA	W 38–0	200	
November 14		Boston Athletic Association	Cambridge, MA	W 51–12	5,000–8,000	
November 21		vs. Yale	Hampden Park; Springfield, MA (rivalry)	L 0–10	20,000–25,000	
