= 1891 Lehigh football team =

American college football season

1891 Lehigh football
- Conference: Independent
- Record: 7–4
- Head coach: None

1891 Eastern college football independents records
	Conf.			Overall
Team	W	L	T	W		L		T
Yale		–		13	–	0	–	0
Harvard		–		13	–	1	–	0
Princeton		–		12	–	1	–	0
Tufts		–		7	–	1	–	0
Penn		–		11	–	2	–	0
Colgate		–		4	–	1	–	0
Army		–		4	–	1	–	1
Bucknell		–		6	–	2	–	1
Navy		–		5	–	2	–	0
Cornell		–		7	–	3	–	0
Geneva		–		4	–	2	–	0
Washington & Jefferson		–		4	–	2	–	0
Lehigh		–		7	–	4	–	0
Rutgers		–		8	–	6	–	0
Brown		–		4	–	6	–	0
Springfield YMCA		–		5	–	8	–	1
Fordham		–		1	–	2	–	1
Syracuse		–		4	–	7	–	0
Massachusetts		–		2	–	5	–	0
Western Univ. Penn.		–		2	–	6	–	0
Lafayette		–		2	–	9	–	1
NYU		–		1	–	4	–	0
Columbia		–		1	–	5	–	0
Wesleyan		–		1	–	6	–	0

The 1891 Lehigh football team was an American football team that represented Lehigh University as an independent during the 1891 college football season. The team compiled a 7–6 record and was outscored by a total of 198 to 174.

== Schedule ==
Date	Opponent	Site	Result	Attendance	Source
September 26	Bucknell	Bethlehem, PA	W 62–4		
October 3	Penn State	Bethlehem, PA	W 24–2		
October 8	Princeton	Bethlehem, PA	L 0–18	2,000	
October 10	Franklin & Marshall	Bethlehem, PA	W 22–0		
October 14	at Princeton	Princeton, NJ	L 0–30		
October 17	Rutgers	Bethlehem, PA	W 22–0	1,000	
October 24	Penn	Bethlehem, PA	L 0–42		
October 31	at Yale	Yale Field; New Haven, CT	L 0–38		
November 4	Lafayette	Bethlehem, PA (rivalry)	L 4–22		
November 7	at Cornell	Ithaca, NY	L 0–24	1,500	
November 11	at Lafayette	The Quad; Easton, PA	W 6–2	1,500	
November 21	at Penn	Philadelphia, PA	L 0–32		
November 25	vs. Lafayette	Wilkes-Barre, PA	W 16–2		
