= 1891 Swarthmore Quakers football team =

American college football season

1891 Swarthmore Quakers football
- Conference: Pennsylvania Intercollegiate Football Association
- Record: 9–2 (3–2 PIFA)
- Head coach: Jacob K. Shell (4th season)

1891 Pennsylvania Intercollegiate Football Association standings
	Conf.					Overall
Team	W		L		T	W		L		T
Penn State $	4	–	1	–	0	6	–	2	–	0
Bucknell	3	–	1	–	1	6	–	2	–	1
Swarthmore	3	–	2	–	0	9	–	2	–	0
Franklin & Marshall	2	–	2	–	0	2	–	4	–	0
Dickinson	1	–	2	–	1	2	–	3	–	1
Haverford	0	–	5	–	0	0	–	6	–	0
$ – Conference champion

The 1891 Swarthmore Quakers football team was an American football team that represented Swarthmore College a member of the Pennsylvania Intercollegiate Football Association (PIFA) during the 1891 college football season. The team compiled a 9–2 record and outscored opponents by a total of 302 to 94. Jacob K. Shell was the head coach.

== Schedule ==
Date	Opponent	Site	Result	Source
October 3	at Schuylkill Navy*	Philadelphia, PA	W 22–6	
October 7	Shortlidge Academy*	Swarthmore, PA	W 18–0	
October 10	at Pennsylvania Military*	Chester, PA	W 54–0	
October 17	Penn State	Swarthmore, PA	L 0–44	
October 21	Schuylkill Navy*	Swarthmore, PA	W 30–0	
October 24	at Bucknell	Lewisburg, PA	L 12–32	
October 29	at Shortlidge Academy*	Wilmington, DE	W 22–0	
October 31	at Schuylkill Navy*	Philadelphia, PA	W 16–6	
November 7	Dickinson	Swarthmore, PA	W 46–0	
November 14	at Franklin & Marshall	Lancaster, PA	W 20–6	
November 21	vs. Haverford	University grounds; Philadelphia, PA (rivalry)	W 62–0	
*Non-conference game
