= 1891 Springfield YMCA football team =

American college football season

1891 Springfield YMCA football
- Conference: Independent
- Record: 5–8–1
- Head coach: Amos Alonzo Stagg (2nd season)
- Captain: Amos Alonzo Stagg
- Home stadium: Outing Park

1891 Eastern college football independents records
	Conf.			Overall
Team	W	L	T	W		L		T
Yale		–		13	–	0	–	0
Harvard		–		13	–	1	–	0
Princeton		–		12	–	1	–	0
Tufts		–		7	–	1	–	0
Penn		–		11	–	2	–	0
Colgate		–		4	–	1	–	0
Army		–		4	–	1	–	1
Bucknell		–		6	–	2	–	1
Navy		–		5	–	2	–	0
Cornell		–		7	–	3	–	0
Geneva		–		4	–	2	–	0
Washington & Jefferson		–		4	–	2	–	0
Lehigh		–		7	–	4	–	0
Rutgers		–		8	–	6	–	0
Brown		–		4	–	6	–	0
Springfield YMCA		–		5	–	8	–	1
Fordham		–		1	–	2	–	1
Syracuse		–		4	–	7	–	0
Massachusetts		–		2	–	5	–	0
Western Univ. Penn.		–		2	–	6	–	0
Lafayette		–		2	–	9	–	1
NYU		–		1	–	4	–	0
Columbia		–		1	–	5	–	0
Wesleyan		–		1	–	6	–	0

The 1891 Springfield YMCA football team, also known as the Christian Workers and the Staggs, was an American football team that represented the International Young Men's Christian Association Training School—now known as Springfield College–as an independent during the 1891 college football season. Led by Amos Alonzo Stagg in his second and final season as head coach, the team compiled a record of 5–8–1. Stagg also played for the team at fullback and halfback. Springfield YMCA played home games at Outing Park in Springfield, Massachusetts.

== Schedule ==
Date	Time	Opponent	Site	Result	Attendance	Source
September 23		at Phillips Academy	Andover, MA	W 30–18		
September ?		Connecticut Literary Institute	Springfield, MA	W 46–0		
September 30	4:00 p.m.	at Trinity (CT)	Hartford, CT	L 14–16		
October 3		at Orange Athletic Club	Orange Oval; Orange, NJ	W 16–0		
October 7	3:35 p.m.	at Amherst	Pratt Field; Amherst, MA	T 12–12		
October 10	3:38 p.m.	at Wesleyan	Middletown, CT	L 8–12		
October 14		at Yale	Yale Field; New Haven, CT	L 0–28	500	
October 17		Massachusetts	Outing Park; Springfield, MA	W 30–0	300	
October 21		Amherst	Outing Park; Springfield, MA	W 18–4		
October 24	2:35 p.m.	at Williams	Weston Field; Williamstown, MA	L 6–16		
October 28	3:15 p.m.	at Amherst	Pratt Field; Amherst, MA	L 4–24		
October 31		at Harvard	Jarvis Field; Cambridge, MA	L 0–34	2,500–3,000	
November 7		at Harvard	Jarvis Field; Cambridge, MA	L 4–44	1,500	
November 10	3:30 p.m.	Boston Athletic Association	Outing Park; Springfield, MA	L 4–42		
