= 1891 Williams Ephs football team =

American college football season

1891 Williams Ephs football

EIFA champion
- Conference: Eastern Intercollegiate Football Association
- Record: 8–2–1 (3–0–1 EIFA)
- Head coach: None
- Captain: O'Brien
- Home stadium: Weston Field

1891 Eastern Intercollegiate Football Association standings
	Conf.					Overall
Team	W		L		T	W		L		T
Williams $	3	–	0	–	1	8	–	2	–	1
Amherst	2	–	0	–	2	8	–	4	–	3
Dartmouth	2	–	1	–	1	2	–	2	–	1
Boston Tech	1	–	3	–	0	5	–	7	–	2
Stevens	0	–	4	–	0	3	–	7	–	0
$ – Conference champion

The 1891 Williams Ephs football team represented the Williams College as a member of the Eastern Intercollegiate Football Association (EIFA) during the 1891 college football season. Williams compiled an overall record of 8–2–1 with a mark of 3–0–1 in conference play, winning the EIFA title for the second consecutive season. The team played home games at Weston Field in Williamstown, Massachusetts.

== Schedule ==
Date	Time	Opponent	Site	Result	Attendance	Source
October 3		Laureates of Troy*	Weston Field; Williamstown, MA	W 42–0		
October 10		vs. Yale*	Ridgefield grounds; Albany, NY	L 0–46	2,000–2,500	
October 14		at Laureates of Troy*	Laureate grounds; Troy, NY	W 46–0		
October 17		at Harvard*	Jarvis Field; Cambridge, MA	L 6–26	3,500	
October 21		Fordham*	Weston Field; Williamstown, MA	W 40–0	800	
October 24	2:35 p.m.	Springfield YMCA*	Weston Field; Williamstown, MA	W 16–6		
October 31	3:40 p.m.	Stevens	Weston Field; Williamstown, MA	W 60–0	1,000	
November 4	2:18 p.m.	Brown*	Weston Field; Williamstown, MA	W 58–0		
November 7	2:00 p.m.	Boston Tech	Weston Field; Williamstown, MA	W 30–0		
November 14	2:30 p.m.	at Darmouth	Hanover, NH	W 14–6	700	
November 20		at Amherst	Pratt Field; Amherst, MA (rivalry)	T 0–0	1,000–2,000	
*Non-conference game
