= 1891 Princeton Tigers football team =

American college football season

1891 Princeton Tigers football
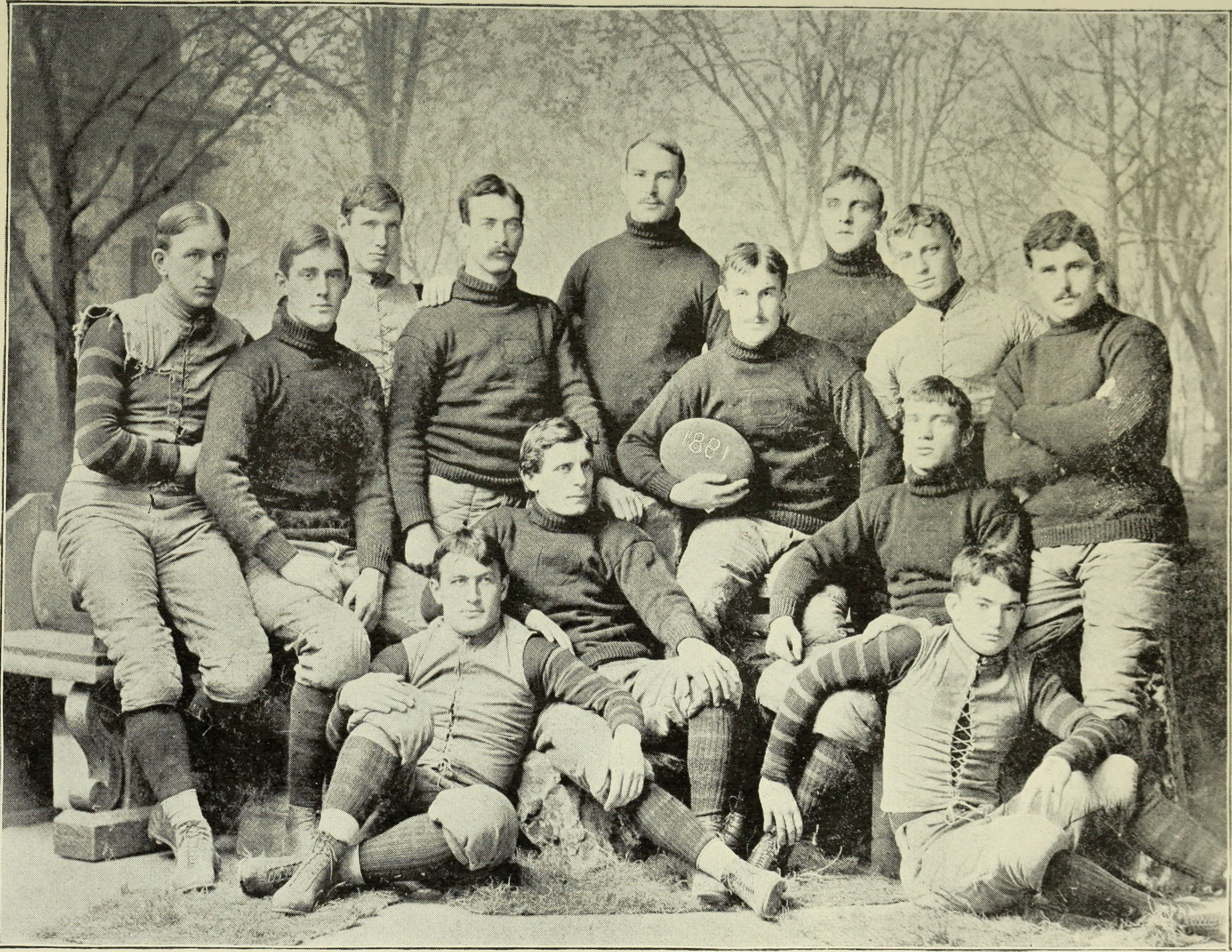
- Conference: Independent
- Record: 12–1
- Head coach: None
- Captain: Ralph Warren
- Home stadium: University Field

1891 Eastern college football independents records
	Conf.			Overall
Team	W	L	T	W		L		T
Yale		–		13	–	0	–	0
Harvard		–		13	–	1	–	0
Princeton		–		12	–	1	–	0
Tufts		–		7	–	1	–	0
Penn		–		11	–	2	–	0
Colgate		–		4	–	1	–	0
Army		–		4	–	1	–	1
Bucknell		–		6	–	2	–	1
Navy		–		5	–	2	–	0
Cornell		–		7	–	3	–	0
Geneva		–		4	–	2	–	0
Washington & Jefferson		–		4	–	2	–	0
Lehigh		–		7	–	4	–	0
Rutgers		–		8	–	6	–	0
Brown		–		4	–	6	–	0
Springfield YMCA		–		5	–	8	–	1
Fordham		–		1	–	2	–	1
Syracuse		–		4	–	7	–	0
Massachusetts		–		2	–	5	–	0
Western Univ. Penn.		–		2	–	6	–	0
Lafayette		–		2	–	9	–	1
NYU		–		1	–	4	–	0
Columbia		–		1	–	5	–	0
Wesleyan		–		1	–	6	–	0

The 1891 Princeton Tigers football team represented Princeton University in the 1891 college football season. The team finished with a 12–1 record. The Tigers recorded 12 shutouts and outscored opponents by a combined total of 391 to 0 in their first 12 games. The team's sole loss was in the final game of the season by a 19–0 score against Yale.

Three Princeton players, quarterback Philip King, fullback Sheppard Homans, Jr., and guard Jesse Riggs, were consensus first-team honorees on the 1891 College Football All-America Team.

== Schedule ==
Date	Time	Opponent	Site	Result	Attendance	Source
October 3		Rutgers	University Field; Princeton, NJ (rivalry)	W 12–0		
October 8	2:20 p.m.	at Lehigh	Bethlehem, PA	W 18–0	2,000	
October 10		at Crescent Athletic Club	Eastern Park; Brooklyn, NY	W 28–0	3,000	
October 14		Lehigh	University Field; Princeton, NJ	W 30–0		
October 17		at Franklin & Marshall	McGrann's Park; Lancaster, PA	W 44–0	> 1,500	
October 20		at Lafayette	Easton, PA	W 24–0		
October 24		New York Athletic Club	University Field; Princeton, NJ	W 28–0		
October 28		Manhattan Athletic Club	University Field; Princeton, NJ	W 78–0		
October 31		vs. Wesleyan	Manhattan Field; New York, NY	W 73–0	3,000	
November 3		at Orange Athletic Club	Orange Oval; East Orange, New Jersey	W 26–0	3,500	
November 7		at Penn	Germantown Cricket Club; Philadelphia, PA (rivalry)	W 24–0	12,000	
November 14		Cornell	University Field; Princeton, NJ	W 6–0	2,000	
November 26		vs. Yale	Manhattan Field; New York, NY (rivalry)	L 0–19	40,000	

== Roster ==
- Adams, HB
- Martin V. Bergen, FB
- Parke H. Davis, T
- Dewitt
- Dowkhout, T
- Joseph Marshall Flint, HB
- Anson Harrold, T
- Augustus Holly, G
- Sheppard Homans, Jr., FB
- Irving, E
- Philip King, HB
- Ludlow, E
- Franklin Morse, QB
- Johnny Poe, FB
- Jesse Riggs, G
- Scudder, G
- Symmes, C
- Taylor, G
- H. H. Vincent, E
- Voorhees, HB
- Ralph Warren, E
- Art Wheeler, G
- Clinton Wood, HB
