= 1891 Stevens football team =

American college football season

1891 Stevens football
- Conference: Eastern Intercollegiate Football Association
- Record: 3–7 (0–4 EIFA)
- Head coach: None
- Home stadium: St. George's Cricket Club grounds

1891 Eastern Intercollegiate Football Association standings
	Conf.					Overall
Team	W		L		T	W		L		T
Williams $	3	–	0	–	1	8	–	2	–	1
Amherst	2	–	0	–	2	8	–	4	–	3
Dartmouth	2	–	1	–	1	2	–	2	–	1
Boston Tech	1	–	3	–	0	5	–	7	–	2
Stevens	0	–	4	–	0	3	–	7	–	0
$ – Conference champion

The 1891 Stevens football team represented Stevens Institute of Technology as a member of the Eastern Intercollegiate Football Association (EIFA) during the 1891 college football season. Stevens compiled an overall record of 3–7 with a mark of 0–4 in conference play, placing last out of five teams in the EIFA. The team played home games at St. George's Cricket Grounds in Hoboken, New Jersey.

== Schedule ==
Date	Time	Opponent	Site	Result	Attendance	Source
October 3		New York Athletic Club*	St. George's Cricket Club grounds; Hoboken, NJ	W 6–5		
October 14		NYU*	St. George's Cricket Club grounds; Hoboken, NJ	W 0–38		
October 17		at Cornell*	Ithaca, NY	L 0–72		
October 21		Columbia*	St. George's Cricket Club grounds; Hoboken, NJ	W 52–0	500	
October 24		at Rutgers*	New Brunswick, NJ	L 10–12	1,250	
October 31	3:40 p.m.	at Williams	Weston Field; Williamstown, MA	L 0–60	1,000	
November 4		Dartmouth	St. George's Cricket Club grounds; Hoboken, NJ	L 12–32	1,000	
November 7		at Army*	The Plain; West Point, NY	L 12–14	1,000	
November 14	3:36 p.m.	at Amherst	Pratt Field; Amherst, MA	L 0–38		
November 26		Boston Tech	St. George's Cricket Club grounds; Hoboken, NJ	L 0–16		
*Non-conference game

== Freshmen team schedule ==
Date	Opponent	Site	Result	Source
November 3	at Montclair Athletic Club	Montclair, NJ	W 10–6	
