= John C. B. Pendleton =

American football coach and stockbroker

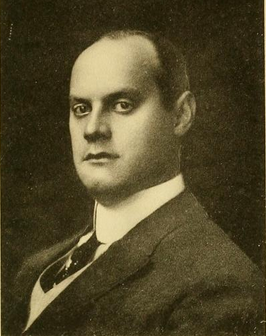
- Pendleton, c. 1907

Biographical details
- Born: September 26, 1871; Baltimore, Maryland, U.S.
- Died: February 12, 1938 (aged 66); Baltimore, Maryland, U.S.

Coaching career (HC unless noted)
- 1891: Rutgers
- 1896–1897: Rutgers

Head coaching record
- Overall: 15–18

John Chester Backus Pendleton (September 26, 1871 – February 12, 1938) was an American college football coach and stockbroker from Baltimore. He was the head football coach at Rutgers University in 1891 and from 1896 to 1897. He later became a member of the Baltimore Stock Exchange in 1897 and was employed thereafter as a stockbroker in that city.

== Early years and Rutgers ==
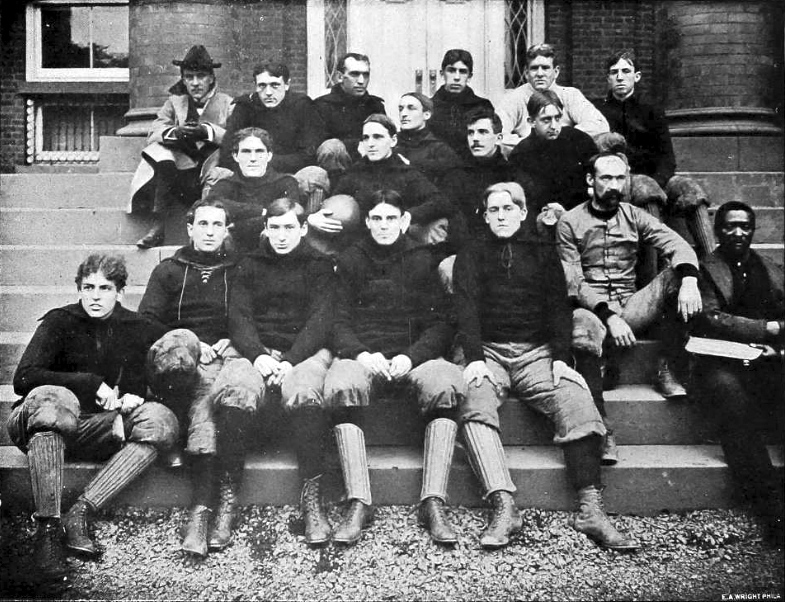
1897 Rutgers football team coached by Pendleton

A native of Baltimore, Pendleton attended Princeton University.

Pendleton served as the head football coach at Rutgers University in 1891 and from 1896 to 1897. In three years as the head coach, he compiled a record of 15–18.

== Business and military career ==
At the time of the 1900 United States census, Pendleton was living in Baltimore and working as a stockbroker.

In the Quindecennial Record of Princeton's Class of 1892, issued in 1907, Pendleton was described as being "the stockbroking member of the '92 syndicate that runs Baltimore." Pendleton wrote: "[T]he long, thing John, whom you once knew, is no more, as I now way two hundred and seventeen pounds in my birthday clothes. In the year 1897 I became a member of the Baltimore Stock Exchange, in which business I am still engaged, being associated with the office of H. A. Harrick. In January of this year I was lifted from the depths of single misery by being married, at which event Alf. Riggs ably assisted as my best man."

At the time of the 1910 United States census, he was living with his wife and mother-in-law in Baltimore and was employed as a stockbroker. He retired from stockbrokering in 1914. He served in the United States Army as a first lieutenant in the Procurement Division at Washington, D.C. during World War I from August 20, 1918, to January 13, 1919. At the time of the 1920 and 1930 United States censuses, Pendleton was living in Baltimore with his wife Mildred and listed no employment in the census records.

== Personal life ==
In December 1906, The Washington Post announced as "one of the most important engagements of the year," that Pendleton, described as "a Princeton graduate and well-known clubman," had become engaged to Mildred Morris, described as "one of the best known and most accomplished girls in Baltimore." The couple was married in Baltimore in January 1907.

Pendleton died in 1938 after a long illness.

== Head coaching record ==
Year	Team	Overall	Conference	Standing	Bowl/playoffs
Rutgers Queensmen (Independent) (1891)
1891	Rutgers	8–6			
Rutgers Queensmen (Independent) (1896–1897)
1896	Rutgers	5–7			
1897	Rutgers	2–5			
Rutgers:		15–18			
Total:		15–18			
