= 1891 Amherst football team =

American college football season

1891 Amherst football
- Conference: Eastern Intercollegiate Football Association
- Record: 8–4–3 (2–0–2 EIFA)
- Head coach: None
- Captain: William H. Lewis
- Home stadium: Pratt Field

1891 Eastern Intercollegiate Football Association standings
	Conf.					Overall
Team	W		L		T	W		L		T
Williams $	3	–	0	–	1	8	–	2	–	1
Amherst	2	–	0	–	2	8	–	4	–	3
Dartmouth	2	–	1	–	1	2	–	2	–	1
Boston Tech	1	–	3	–	0	5	–	7	–	2
Stevens	0	–	4	–	0	3	–	7	–	0
$ – Conference champion

The 1891 Amherst football team represented the Amherst College as a member of the Eastern Intercollegiate Football Association (EIFA) during the 1891 college football season. Amherst compiled an overall record of 8–4–3 with a mark of 2–0–2 in conference play, placing second in the EIFA. The team played home games at Pratt Field in Amherst, Massachusetts.

== Schedule ==
Date	Time	Opponent	Site	Result	Attendance	Source
September 30		Massachusetts*	Pratt Field; Amherst, MA	W 44–0		
October 3	3:53 p.m.	Williston Seminary*	Pratt Field; Amherst, MA	W 100–0		
October 7	3:35 p.m.	Springfield YMCA*	Pratt Field; Amherst, MA	T 12–12		
October 9		at Phillips Academy*	Andover, MA	W 22–4		
October 10		at Harvard*	Jarvis Field; Cambridge, MA	L 0–18	3,500	
October 21		at Springfield YMCA*	Outing Park; Springfield, MA	L 4–18		
October 24		at Harvard*	Jarvis Field; Cambridge, MA	L 0–39	800	
October 27	3:30 p.m.	Massachusetts*	Pratt Field; Amherst, MA	W 16–0		
October 28	3:15 p.m.	Springfield YMCA*	Pratt Field; Amherst, MA	W 24–4		
October 29	4:21 p.m.	at Massachusetts*	Agricultural College campus; Amherst, MA	W 20–4		
October 31		at Boston Tech	South End Grounds; Boston, MA	W 24–14	600	
November 7	3:30 p.m.	at Dartmouth	Hanover, NH	T 14–14	800	
November 11	2:30 p.m.	at Yale	Yale Field; New Haven, CT	L 0–27	350	
November 14	3:36 p.m.	Stevens	Pratt Field; Amherst, MA	W 38–0		
November 20		Williams	Pratt Field; Amherst, MA (rivalry)	T 0–0	1,000–2,000	
*Non-conference game
