= 1891 Boston Tech football team =

American college football season

1891 Boston Tech football
- Conference: Eastern Intercollegiate Football Association
- Record: 5–7–2 (1–3 EIFA)
- Head coach: None
- Home stadium: South End Grounds; Congress Street Grounds

1891 Eastern Intercollegiate Football Association standings
	Conf.					Overall
Team	W		L		T	W		L		T
Williams $	3	–	0	–	1	8	–	2	–	1
Amherst	2	–	0	–	2	8	–	4	–	3
Dartmouth	2	–	1	–	1	2	–	2	–	1
Boston Tech	1	–	3	–	0	5	–	7	–	2
Stevens	0	–	4	–	0	3	–	7	–	0
$ – Conference champion

The 1891 Boston Tech football team represented Boston Tech—now known as the Massachusetts Institute of Technology (MIT)—as a member of the Eastern Intercollegiate Football Association (EIFA) during the 1891 college football season. Boston Tech compiled an overall record of 5–7–2 with a mark of 1–3 in conference play, placing fourth in the EIFA. The team played home games at Union Grounds and Congress Street Grounds in Boston.

== Schedule ==
Date	Time	Opponent	Site	Result	Attendance	Source
October 1	4:00 p.m.	Brown*	Boston, MA	L 4–6		
October 3		Boston Athletic Association*	South End Grounds; Boston, MA	T 0–0		
October 7		at Phillips Academy*	Andover, MA	T 4–4		
October 9		Roxbury Latin School*	South End Grounds; Boston, MA	W 38–0	500	
October 10		Phillips Exeter Academy*	South End Grounds; Boston, MA	W 16–4	500	
October 14		at Harvard*	Jarvis Field; Cambridge, MA	L 0–26	3,500	
October 21		at Phillips Exeter Academy*	Exeter, NH	L 0–20		
October 24		Tufts*	South End Grounds; Boston, MA	W 10–6	200	
October 28		at Brown*	Providence, RI	W 14–6	300	
October 31		Amherst	South End Grounds; Boston, MA	L 14–24	600	
November 7	2:00 p.m.	at Williams	Weston Field; Williamstown, MA	L 0–30		
November 14	3:30 p.m.	at Trinity (CT)*	Trinity grounds; Hartford, CT	L 0–22	400–600	
November 20	2:45 p.m.	Dartmouth	Congress Street Grounds; Boston, MA	L 6–8	300	
November 26		at Stevens	St. George's Cricket Club grounds; Hoboken, NJ	W 16–0		
*Non-conference game
