= 1891 Colgate football team =

American college football season

1891 Colgate football
- Conference: Independent
- Record: 4–1
- Head coach: Samuel Colgate Jr. (2nd season)
- Captain: Preston Smith

1891 Eastern college football independents records
| | Conf. | | | Overall |
| Team | W | L | T | W | | L | | T |
|---|---|---|---|---|---|---|---|---|
| Yale | | – | | 13 | – | 0 | – | 0 |
| Harvard | | – | | 13 | – | 1 | – | 0 |
| Princeton | | – | | 12 | – | 1 | – | 0 |
| Tufts | | – | | 7 | – | 1 | – | 0 |
| Penn | | – | | 11 | – | 2 | – | 0 |
| Colgate | | – | | 4 | – | 1 | – | 0 |
| Army | | – | | 4 | – | 1 | – | 1 |
| Bucknell | | – | | 6 | – | 2 | – | 1 |
| Navy | | – | | 5 | – | 2 | – | 0 |
| Cornell | | – | | 7 | – | 3 | – | 0 |
| Geneva | | – | | 4 | – | 2 | – | 0 |
| Washington & Jefferson | | – | | 4 | – | 2 | – | 0 |
| Lehigh | | – | | 7 | – | 4 | – | 0 |
| Rutgers | | – | | 8 | – | 6 | – | 0 |
| Brown | | – | | 4 | – | 6 | – | 0 |
| Springfield YMCA | | – | | 5 | – | 8 | – | 1 |
| Fordham | | – | | 1 | – | 2 | – | 1 |
| Syracuse | | – | | 4 | – | 7 | – | 0 |
| Massachusetts | | – | | 2 | – | 5 | – | 0 |
| Western Univ. Penn. | | – | | 2 | – | 6 | – | 0 |
| Lafayette | | – | | 2 | – | 9 | – | 1 |
| NYU | | – | | 1 | – | 4 | – | 0 |
| Columbia | | – | | 1 | – | 5 | – | 0 |
| Wesleyan | | – | | 1 | – | 6 | – | 0 |

The 1891 Colgate football team represented Colgate University in the 1891 college football season.

== Schedule ==
| Date | Opponent | Site | Result |
|---|---|---|---|
| October 17 | at Laureates | Troy, NY | L 10–18 |
| October 24 | Hamilton | Hamilton, NY | W 22–4 |
| November 7 | at Syracuse | Syracuse, NY (rivalry) | W 22–16 |
| November 16 | at Union (NY) | Schenectady, NY | W 20–12 |
| November 26 | at Rochester | Rochester, NY | W 6–0 |
