= 1891 Geneva Covenanters football team =

American college football season

1891 Geneva Covenanters football
- Conference: Independent
- Record: 4–2
- Head coach: William McCracken (2nd season)
- Captain: Charles Bemies

1891 Eastern college football independents records
	Conf.			Overall
Team	W	L	T	W		L		T
Yale		–		13	–	0	–	0
Harvard		–		13	–	1	–	0
Princeton		–		12	–	1	–	0
Tufts		–		7	–	1	–	0
Penn		–		11	–	2	–	0
Colgate		–		4	–	1	–	0
Army		–		4	–	1	–	1
Bucknell		–		6	–	2	–	1
Navy		–		5	–	2	–	0
Cornell		–		7	–	3	–	0
Geneva		–		4	–	2	–	0
Washington & Jefferson		–		4	–	2	–	0
Lehigh		–		7	–	4	–	0
Rutgers		–		8	–	6	–	0
Brown		–		4	–	6	–	0
Springfield YMCA		–		5	–	8	–	1
Fordham		–		1	–	2	–	1
Syracuse		–		4	–	7	–	0
Massachusetts		–		2	–	5	–	0
Western Univ. Penn.		–		2	–	6	–	0
Lafayette		–		2	–	9	–	1
NYU		–		1	–	4	–	0
Columbia		–		1	–	5	–	0
Wesleyan		–		1	–	6	–	0

The 1891 Geneva Covenanters football team was an American football team that represented Geneva College as an independent during the 1891 college football season. Led by second-year head coach William McCracken, Geneva compiled a record of 4–2. The team's captain was Charles Bemies.

== Schedule ==
Date	Opponent	Site	Result	Source
October 17	Western University of Pennsylvania	Beaver Falls, PA	L 0–42	
October 24	Washington & Jefferson	College Park; Washington, PA	L 8–26	
October 31	Western University of Pennsylvania	Beaver Falls, PA	W 12–4	
November 7	at Westminster (PA)	New Wilmington, PA	W 40–0	
November 14	West Penn Medical	Beaver Falls, PA	W 58–0	
November 21	Western University of Pennsylvania	Pittsburgh, PA	W 6–4	
