= 1891 Massachusetts Aggies football team =

American college football season

1891 Massachusetts Aggies football
- Conference: Independent
- Record: 2–5
- Head coach: None
- Home stadium: Alumni Field

1891 Eastern college football independents records
	Conf.			Overall
Team	W	L	T	W		L		T
Yale		–		13	–	0	–	0
Harvard		–		13	–	1	–	0
Princeton		–		12	–	1	–	0
Tufts		–		7	–	1	–	0
Penn		–		11	–	2	–	0
Colgate		–		4	–	1	–	0
Army		–		4	–	1	–	1
Bucknell		–		6	–	2	–	1
Navy		–		5	–	2	–	0
Cornell		–		7	–	3	–	0
Geneva		–		4	–	2	–	0
Washington & Jefferson		–		4	–	2	–	0
Lehigh		–		7	–	4	–	0
Rutgers		–		8	–	6	–	0
Brown		–		4	–	6	–	0
Springfield YMCA		–		5	–	8	–	1
Fordham		–		1	–	2	–	1
Syracuse		–		4	–	7	–	0
Massachusetts		–		2	–	5	–	0
Western Univ. Penn.		–		2	–	6	–	0
Lafayette		–		2	–	9	–	1
NYU		–		1	–	4	–	0
Columbia		–		1	–	5	–	0
Wesleyan		–		1	–	6	–	0

The 1891 Massachusetts Aggies football team represented Massachusetts Agricultural College in the 1891 college football season. The team played its home games at Alumni Field in Amherst, Massachusetts. Massachusetts finished the season with a record of 2–5.

== Schedule ==
Date	Time	Opponent	Site	Result	Attendance	Source
September 26		Trinity (CT)	Amherst, MA	L 0–16		
September 30		at Amherst	Pratt Field; Amherst, MA	L 0–44		
October 17		at Springfield YMCA	Outing Park; Springfield, MA	L 0–30	300	
October		at Worcester Tech	Worcester, MA	W 36–10		
October 27	3:30 p.m.	at Amherst	Pratt Field; Amherst, MA	L 0–16		
October 29	4:21 p.m.	Amherst	Agricultural College campus; Amherst, MA	L 4–20		
November 11	3:25 p.m.	Holy Cross	Amherst, MA	W 16–6		
