= 1891 NYU Violets football team =

American college football season

1891 NYU Violets football
- Conference: Independent
- Record: 1–4

1891 Eastern college football independents records
	Conf.			Overall
Team	W	L	T	W		L		T
Yale		–		13	–	0	–	0
Harvard		–		13	–	1	–	0
Princeton		–		12	–	1	–	0
Tufts		–		7	–	1	–	0
Penn		–		11	–	2	–	0
Colgate		–		4	–	1	–	0
Army		–		4	–	1	–	1
Bucknell		–		6	–	2	–	1
Navy		–		5	–	2	–	0
Cornell		–		7	–	3	–	0
Geneva		–		4	–	2	–	0
Washington & Jefferson		–		4	–	2	–	0
Lehigh		–		7	–	4	–	0
Rutgers		–		8	–	6	–	0
Brown		–		4	–	6	–	0
Springfield YMCA		–		5	–	8	–	1
Fordham		–		1	–	2	–	1
Syracuse		–		4	–	7	–	0
Massachusetts		–		2	–	5	–	0
Western Univ. Penn.		–		2	–	6	–	0
Lafayette		–		2	–	9	–	1
NYU		–		1	–	4	–	0
Columbia		–		1	–	5	–	0
Wesleyan		–		1	–	6	–	0

The 1891 NYU Violets football team was an American football team that represented New York University (NYU) as an independent during the 1891 college football season. The Violets compiled a record of 1–4.

== Schedule ==
Date	Time	Opponent	Site	Result	Attendance	Source
October 14		at Stevens	St. George's Cricket Club grounds; Hoboken, NJ	L 0–38		
October 17	3:45 p.m.	at Berkeley Athletic Club	Berkeley Oval; Bronx, NY	L 0–20		
October 24		at Berkely Athletic Club	Berkeley Oval; Bronx, NY	W 6–0	1,500	
October 28		vs. New York Athletic Club	Polo Grounds; New York, NY	L (forfeit)		
November 7		at Rutgers	New Brunswick, NJ	L 4–70		
