= 1891 Brown Bears football team =

American college football season

1891 Brown Bears football
- Conference: Independent
- Record: 4–6
- Head coach: None
- Home stadium: Adelaide Park

1891 Eastern college football independents records
	Conf.			Overall
Team	W	L	T	W		L		T
Yale		–		13	–	0	–	0
Harvard		–		13	–	1	–	0
Princeton		–		12	–	1	–	0
Tufts		–		7	–	1	–	0
Penn		–		11	–	2	–	0
Colgate		–		4	–	1	–	0
Army		–		4	–	1	–	1
Bucknell		–		6	–	2	–	1
Navy		–		5	–	2	–	0
Cornell		–		7	–	3	–	0
Geneva		–		4	–	2	–	0
Washington & Jefferson		–		4	–	2	–	0
Lehigh		–		7	–	4	–	0
Rutgers		–		8	–	6	–	0
Brown		–		4	–	6	–	0
Springfield YMCA		–		5	–	8	–	1
Fordham		–		1	–	2	–	1
Syracuse		–		4	–	7	–	0
Massachusetts		–		2	–	5	–	0
Western Univ. Penn.		–		2	–	6	–	0
Lafayette		–		2	–	9	–	1
NYU		–		1	–	4	–	0
Columbia		–		1	–	5	–	0
Wesleyan		–		1	–	6	–	0

The 1891 Brown Bears football team represented Brown University as an independent during the 1891 college football season. The team compiled a record of 4–6.

== Schedule ==
Date	Time	Opponent	Site	Result	Attendance	Source
October 1	4:00 p.m.	at Boston Tech	Boston, MA	W 6–4		
October 3	4:00 p.m.	Trinity (CT)	Adelaide Park; Providence, RI	L 0–8		
October 7	3:45 p.m.	at Fall River	Y. M. C. grounds; Fall River, MA	W 18–4	300	
October 14		at Phillips Academy	Andover, MA	L 0–26		
October 17	2:30 p.m.	at Bowdoin	Base ball grounds; Portland, ME	L 18–24	3,000	
October 24		Bowdoin	Providence, RI	W 18–0		
October 28		Boston Tech	Providence, RI	L 6–14	300	
November 4	2:18 p.m.	at Williams	Weston Field; Williamstown, MA	L 0–58		
November 7		at Worcester Tech	Worcester, MA	W 32–6		
November 14		Tufts	Providence, RI	L 12–34		
