= 1891 Cornell Big Red football team =

American college football season

1891 Cornell Big Red football
- Conference: Independent
- Record: 7–3
- Head coach: None
- Captain: Carl Johanson

1891 Eastern college football independents records
	Conf.			Overall
Team	W	L	T	W		L		T
Yale		–		13	–	0	–	0
Harvard		–		13	–	1	–	0
Princeton		–		12	–	1	–	0
Tufts		–		7	–	1	–	0
Penn		–		11	–	2	–	0
Colgate		–		4	–	1	–	0
Army		–		4	–	1	–	1
Bucknell		–		6	–	2	–	1
Navy		–		5	–	2	–	0
Cornell		–		7	–	3	–	0
Geneva		–		4	–	2	–	0
Washington & Jefferson		–		4	–	2	–	0
Lehigh		–		7	–	4	–	0
Rutgers		–		8	–	6	–	0
Brown		–		4	–	6	–	0
Springfield YMCA		–		5	–	8	–	1
Fordham		–		1	–	2	–	1
Syracuse		–		4	–	7	–	0
Massachusetts		–		2	–	5	–	0
Western Univ. Penn.		–		2	–	6	–	0
Lafayette		–		2	–	9	–	1
NYU		–		1	–	4	–	0
Columbia		–		1	–	5	–	0
Wesleyan		–		1	–	6	–	0

The 1891 Cornell Big Red football team was an American football team that represented Cornell University during the 1891 college football season. The team compiled a 7–3 record and outscored all opponents by a combined total of 298 to 34.

== Schedule ==
Date	Opponent	Site	Result	Source
October 3	Syracuse	Ithaca, NY	W 68–0	
October 10	Bucknell	Ithaca, NY	L 0–4	
October 17	Stevens	Ithaca, NY	W 72–0	
October 24	Lafayette	Ithaca, NY	W 30–0	
November 7	Lehigh	Ithaca, NY	W 24–0	
November 14	at Princeton	Princeton, NJ	L 0–6	
November 21	vs. Michigan	D.A.C. Park; Detroit, MI	W 58–12	
November 23	at Detroit Athletic Club	Detroit, MI	W 32–0	
November 25	at Chicago University Club	South Side Park; Chicago, IL	L 4–12	
November 28	vs. Michigan	South Side Park; Chicago, IL	W 10–0	

== Game summaries ==
=== Michigan (Detroit) ===
The 1891 season included two games against the 1891 Michigan Wolverines football team, played in Detroit on November 21, 1891, and in Chicago on November 28, 1891. In the first game, played at D.A.C. Park, Cornell won by a lopsided score of 58-12. The Detroit Free Press reported that the game was played in the rain and, while the crowd of 2,300 persons was "made up of the best class of people including many ladies, the rain doubtless kept fully as many away who would have been on hand but for the thought that the game would be played in the mist and mud." Michigan's scoring came on touchdowns by Van Inwagen and Rittinger, and two successful goal kicks by Dygert.

Despite the lopsided score of the first Cornell game, the Chicago Daily Tribune reported: "The Cornell-University of Michigan football at D.A.C. Park this afternoon was undoubtedly the finest exhibition of sport ever seen in Detroit. The game was one-sided, but was by no means a walkaway for the victors." Michigan coach, Mike Murphy, also saw some positive signs in Michigan's performance, as the Free Press reported: "Michigan has the greater weight on the rush line and with practice will be far stronger than at present. In fact Murphy is jubilant and thinks that next year he can hustle them all."

=== Michigan (Chicago) ===
The final game was played on November 28, 1891, at the South Side Baseball Grounds in Chicago, with Cornell winning 10-0. The New York Times called it "one of the prettiest foot-ball games ever played in the West" and described the wintry conditions of the game: "The field was covered with a six-inch blanket of snow, the air was icy, and frosted feet and hands were among the thousands of spectators ... Three minutes after the game began the ball was covered with ice, but the dazzling white ground soon began to look as though a herd of elephants had been tramping on it."

The Detroit Free Press reported that Michigan gave Cornell "a sharp tussle" and that six of Cornell's points "were scored on a fluke, the ball being fumbled on a pass back." Powers, left end; Mowrey, left tackle; Thomas, left guard; Jeffries, center; Tupper, right guard; Griffin, right tackle;Hayes, right end, Sherman, quarterback; Van Inwagen, left half; Riitenger, right half; Dygert, fullback.
