= Jacob Shell (geographer) =

American geographer

Jacob Shell is an American geographer. He is an associate professor in the department of geography, environment and urban studies at Temple University.

== Books ==
- Giants of the Monsoon Forest: Living and Working with Elephants (W.W. Norton, 2019)
- Transportation and Revolt: Pigeons, Mules, Canals, and the Vanishing Geographies of Subversive Mobility (MIT Press, 2015)
