= William Galbraith (American football) =

American football coach

Biographical details
- Education: Cornell University

Coaching career (HC unless noted)
- 1891: Syracuse

Head coaching record
- Overall: 4–6

William Galbraith was an American college football coach. He served as the head football coach at Syracuse University for one season in 1891, compiling a record of 4–6.

== Head coaching record ==
Year	Team	Overall	Conference	Standing	Bowl/playoffs
Syracuse Orangemen (Independent) (1891)
1891	Syracuse	4–6			
Syracuse:		4–6			
Total:		4–6			
