= Pennsylvania Intercollegiate Football Association =

American football association in Pennsylvania

- Founded: 1891
- Folded: 1892
- Sports fielded: College football

The Pennsylvania Intercollegiate Football Association, or PIFA, was organized on February 28, 1891, and was dissolved within a year.

== Conference members ==
Six colleges from Pennsylvania formed the PIFA:

- University at Lewisburg (now Bucknell)
- Dickinson
- Franklin & Marshall
- Haverford
- Penn State
- Swarthmore

== 1891 season ==
1891 Pennsylvania Intercollegiate Football Association standings
	Conf.					Overall
Team	W		L		T	W		L		T
Penn State $	4	–	1	–	0	6	–	2	–	0
Bucknell	3	–	1	–	1	6	–	2	–	1
Swarthmore	3	–	2	–	0	9	–	2	–	0
Franklin & Marshall	2	–	2	–	0	2	–	4	–	0
Dickinson	1	–	2	–	1	2	–	3	–	1
Haverford	0	–	5	–	0	0	–	6	–	0
$ – Conference champion

Penn State was awarded the 1891 championship. Their record was 4–1 in Association play with the loss being at Bucknell (10–12). However, Bucknell lost at Franklin & Marshall (6–12) and tied at Dickinson (0–0) for a record of 3–1–1.

== See also ==
- List of defunct college football conferences
