= Bert Smyers =

American football player and attorney (1872–1953)

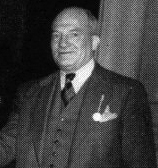
- Smyers at Varsity Letter Club banquet in 1940 Owl yearbook

Profile
- Position: Quarterback

Personal information
- Born: March 1872; Marion Center, Pennsylvania, U.S.
- Died: June 18, 1953 (aged 81)

Career information
- College: Pittsburgh (1889)

Bertrand Hunter Smyers (March 1872 – June 18, 1953) was an attorney and, along with fellow student John Scott, founder of the University of Pittsburgh's football program. Smyers is also considered to be the university's first quarterback.

== Prep school ==
Born in March 1872 in Marion Center, Pennsylvania, Smyers attended Bucknell University when it was a college preparatory school during his senior year of 1888–89. At Bucknell, he had an academic average of 9 out of a scale of 10, considered an outstanding academic achievement, in course that included Natural Philosophy, Rhetoric, Algebra, Caesar, Scriptural History, Composition, Declamation, and Elocution. While there, Smyers was involved in an informal football team, not part of the school's regular sports, which was probably learned from older brothers attending other schools and then taught to pals after school.

== University years ==
In the fall of 1889, the 130 pound Smyers enrolled at the University of Pittsburgh, then called the Western University of Pennsylvania (WUP), to continue his education. He and senior student John Scott assembled a football team of which only three of the players had previously witnessed the sport. Smyers made himself quarterback and Scott was the center and one informal game was played, a loss to Shadyside Academy in 1889. In preparation for the following season, the first official football season of football recognized by the University of Pittsburgh, Smyers and his teammates took up a collection and purchased a football for practices and games, however players were responsible for their own uniforms and Smyers' own uniform was pieced together by his mother and sister.

The first official game for the university was held on October 11, 1890, when the Allegheny Athletic Association's opponent, Shadyside Academy, failed to appear for its game at Exposition Park. Allegheny A.A. called Smyers who brought the WUP team as a replacement. WUP was defeated 38–0. Smyers' team next faced Washington & Jefferson College, losing 32–0, but closed out its inaugural three game season with a win over Geneva College 10–4.

The following season saw Smyers suffer a broken nose in a 40–6 losing effort against Washington and Jefferson and the team finished 2–5 with wins over Western Pennsylvania Medical College, which became affiliated with WUP in 1892 and later merged with the University in 1908 to become its medical school, and Geneva College, who WUP lost two other contests to that same season. Perhaps the most important development for the second season of football had been Smyers recruitment of Joeseph Trees from Normal University of Pennsylvania, who at 210 pounds became WUP's first subsidized athlete. Later in life, Trees made millions in the oil industry and became an important benefactor for the University and athletic department. Today, an athletic facility named Trees Hall still bears his name on the University of Pittsburgh's Oakland campus.

In a letter from Harriet Smyers, Bert's daughter-in-law and wife of son William Hays Smyers, to the University of Pittsburgh in 1990, sent in preparation for celebration of 100 years of football there, further details about Bert are given, as follows:

Once they were near the goal line and having trouble getting over so (Bert) whispered to his pals just to pick him up bodily and throw him over and he'd hold out the ball. Since he was only about 131 pounds this was easy and they made the touchdown. He told the grandchildren, 'I was Pitt's first forward pass.' The flying wedge as I'm sure you know was outlawed because of the serious injuries that resulted. The team locked arms in form of a wedge and plowed through (or over) the opposing team. At one game only 10 men on the (Pitt) team showed up. The opposing team let them "borrow" another man "elsewhere" and make up the 11. Your guess is as good as mine as to where the extra man came from. (Bert) claimed he was the 2nd strongest man at Pitt. The strongest man could chin himself with one arm and (Bert) never managed that.

== Legacy ==
A press release from Pitt, c. 1930, gave the following account of Bert's place in football history:

The man who started football at the University of Pittsburgh (at that time, 1889, Western University of Pennsylvania) is still at it. He is Bert Smyers, attorney, member of the Ohio State Game committee, working to enthuse the followers of the Panthers for the trip to Columbus, Nov. 15. Keen of eye and hard of muscle, though somewhat heavier, Pitt's first quarterback is knee deep in the present campaign, as enthused as he was that fall 41 years ago. He's chairman of the sub-committee working with the former varsity men and managers of which association he also is president. Forty one years ago this fall Smyers, a youth weighing 131 pounds, but hard as nails, arrived at the union station from Marion Center, Indiana County. Money wasn't so plentiful with him so he walked from the station to the university. Walking wasn't much of an item to him, anyhow, as he used to drive a herd of cattle from his home town to a neighboring town, walking both ways a total of fourteen miles. And he did that three times a week at $1.25 per trip. It was this walking schedule that made his legs so hard and his wind so good. And it was working about his father's blacksmith shop the other three days that hardened the muscles in his arms and shoulders. Those muscles are still hard. Arriving at the university Bert was the inspiration for a football team, the first on the hill... where now one of the finest stadiums in the country stands and where one of the nation's greatest teams holds forth. "I played four years, as did most of the boys... And the last two years nearly all of us wore beards or moustaches. Football didn't bring in any revenue then. When we started the game we started very modestly. The boys had to supply their own equipment. I had no money to spend recklessly so I wrote home to mother and told her I needed a pair of football pants and she made them by cutting off the legs of an old gray pair and putting rubber elastic around the knees. The stockings were contributed by my sister. The girls wore heavier stockings than they do now. Football players wore jackets and I tried to describe in a letter to my mother that they were made of canvas. But all the canvas they had was some canvas from some old oat sacks around the barn. So she made me a vest of that with laces from an old corset and I was all ready to play! It was a lot of fun even if the game was not so well organized as today. We played the teams of this section, colleges, prep schools, clubs, etc...."

== Personal life ==
Smyers was married to Flora Bell Hays, on 20 July 1898 at Allegheny. He enjoyed target shooting with his sons. Based on the obituary of son Bertrand Jr., Smyers was also the village blacksmith in Marion Center. Bertrand died on June 18, 1953, at Pittsburgh, and is buried at Marion Center Cemetery. Smyers had 3 sons: Bertrand Jr., William, and Edward.

Bert's daughter-in-law Harriet also recalled in a letter an incident later in Bert's life when he was 60:

Once at a Rotary Club picnic they had a contest to see who could climb furthest up the flag pole. The pole was over 100 feet tall and so wide for the first few feet that his arms could not reach around it. He had to grip it with his legs and arms alternately inching up by grasping the pole with his thighs, reaching up with his arms to get a higher hold and holding with his arms while he moved his legs up an inch or two. He stopped at 60 feet and won the contest. He said he could have gone further but since he was 60 years old that year it seemed a good place to stop. He played tennis every Saturday from April to November and once, when in his 60s beat the Pittsburgh High School Tennis champion at an informal set....

A clipping from "The Rotarian" from 1947, six years prior to his death, had the following to say about Bert Smyers:

Busy Bert. Although writing doggerel is one of his hobbies, BERT H. SMYERS, a member of the Rotary Club of Pittsburgh, Pa., keeps more active physically than many men half his age. Last August, at age 75, he "caught" a game of soft ball at a Rotary picnic, played three sets of tennis, won a prize in a horse-shoe pitching contest, and won another prize in a waltz contest on the dance floor that evening. He is the only surviving member of the first football team... of the University of Pittsburgh....
