= William Davis Mackey =

American politician (born 1913)

William Davis Mackey Sr. (born March 23, 1913) was an American lawyer, state legislator, and teacher in Indiana.

Mackey was born in Marvell, Arkansas and moved with his family to Gary, Indiana as a child. He graduated from Tennessee State University, Allen University, and Lincoln University Law School. In 1962 he received an M.S. degree from Butler University.

He was a member of the NAACP.

He was elected to the Indiana House in 1951 from Marion County, Indiana.
