= 1891 Bucknell football team =

American college football season

1891 Bucknell football
- Conference: Independent
- Record: 6–2–1
- Head coach: None
- Captain: Charles Allen

1891 Eastern college football independents records
	Conf.			Overall
Team	W	L	T	W		L		T
Yale		–		13	–	0	–	0
Harvard		–		13	–	1	–	0
Princeton		–		12	–	1	–	0
Tufts		–		7	–	1	–	0
Penn		–		11	–	2	–	0
Colgate		–		4	–	1	–	0
Army		–		4	–	1	–	1
Bucknell		–		6	–	2	–	1
Navy		–		5	–	2	–	0
Cornell		–		7	–	3	–	0
Geneva		–		4	–	2	–	0
Washington & Jefferson		–		4	–	2	–	0
Lehigh		–		7	–	4	–	0
Rutgers		–		8	–	6	–	0
Brown		–		4	–	6	–	0
Springfield YMCA		–		5	–	8	–	1
Fordham		–		1	–	2	–	1
Syracuse		–		4	–	7	–	0
Massachusetts		–		2	–	5	–	0
Western Univ. Penn.		–		2	–	6	–	0
Lafayette		–		2	–	9	–	1
NYU		–		1	–	4	–	0
Columbia		–		1	–	5	–	0
Wesleyan		–		1	–	6	–	0

The 1891 Bucknell football team was an American football team that represented Bucknell University as an independent during the 1891 college football season. The team compiled a 6–2–1 record and had no head coach. Charles Allen was the team captain. The roster included Andy Wyant, who later played for Amos Alonzo Stagg at the University of Chicago and was inducted into the College Football Hall of Fame.

== Schedule ==
Date	Time	Opponent	Site	Result	Attendance	Source
September 25		at Lafayette	The Quad; Easton, PA	W 16–10		
September 26		at Lehigh	Bethlehem, PA	L 4–62		
October 3		Wyoming Seminary	Lewisburg, PA	W 32–0		
October 10		at Cornell	Ithaca, NY	W 4–0		
October 24		Swarthmore	Lewisburg, PA	W 32–12		
November 7		Penn State	Lewisburg, PA	W 12–10	1,000	
November 14		at Haverford	Haverford, PA	W 70–0		
November 21	2:45 p.m.	at Dickinson	Athletic grounds; Carlisle, PA	T 0–0	400–500	
November 26	3:00 p.m.	at Franklin & Marshall	McGrann's Park; Lancaster, PA	L 6–12	1,250	
