= 1891 Syracuse Orangemen football team =

American college football season

1891 Syracuse Orangemen football
- Conference: Independent
- Record: 4–7
- Head coach: William Galbraith (1st season)
- Captain: William Fanton
- Home stadium: Star Park

1891 Eastern college football independents records
	Conf.			Overall
Team	W	L	T	W		L		T
Yale		–		13	–	0	–	0
Harvard		–		13	–	1	–	0
Princeton		–		12	–	1	–	0
Tufts		–		7	–	1	–	0
Penn		–		11	–	2	–	0
Colgate		–		4	–	1	–	0
Army		–		4	–	1	–	1
Bucknell		–		6	–	2	–	1
Navy		–		5	–	2	–	0
Cornell		–		7	–	3	–	0
Geneva		–		4	–	2	–	0
Washington & Jefferson		–		4	–	2	–	0
Lehigh		–		7	–	4	–	0
Rutgers		–		8	–	6	–	0
Brown		–		4	–	6	–	0
Springfield YMCA		–		5	–	8	–	1
Fordham		–		1	–	2	–	1
Syracuse		–		4	–	7	–	0
Massachusetts		–		2	–	5	–	0
Western Univ. Penn.		–		2	–	6	–	0
Lafayette		–		2	–	9	–	1
NYU		–		1	–	4	–	0
Columbia		–		1	–	5	–	0
Wesleyan		–		1	–	6	–	0

The 1891 Syracuse Orangemen football team represented Syracuse University as an independent during the 1891 college football season. The head coach was William Galbraith, coaching his first season with the Orangemen.

== Schedule ==
Date	Opponent	Site	Result	Attendance
September 26	at Cornell	Ithaca, NY	L 0–68	
October 17	Cornell	Syracuse, NY	L 6–12	800
October 22	Syracuse Athletic Association	Syracuse, NY	W 22–0	
October 24	St. John's Military Academy	Syracuse, NY	L 0–4	800
October 30	at Hamilton	Clinton, NY	L 4–22	
November 7	at Colgate	Hamilton, NY (rivalry)	L 16–22	
November 11	at Union (NY)	Schenectady, NY	L 0–75	
November 12	Syracuse Athletic Association	Syracuse, NY	L 0–28	
November 21	Rochester	Syracuse, NY	W 18–6	
November 26	Syracuse Athletic Association	Syracuse, NY	W 22–10	1,000
November 28	St. John's Military Academy	Syracuse, NY	W 22–4	
