= Phillip Stillman =

American football player (1873–1939)

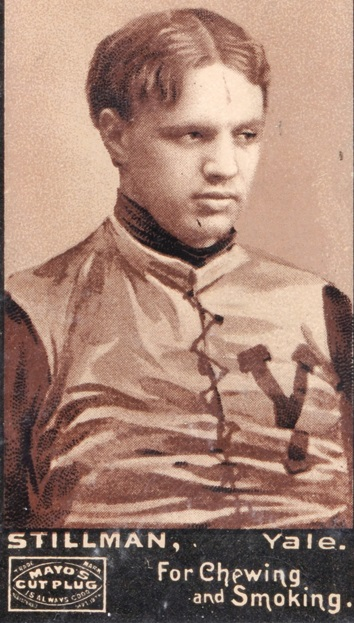
- 1894 Mayo Cut football card

Profile
- Position: Center

Personal information
- Born: August 13, 1873; Brooklyn, New York, U.S.
- Died: October 16, 1939 (aged 66); New York, New York, U.S.

Career information
- High school: Concord (NJ) St. Paul's School
- College: Yale (1892–1894)

Awards and highlights
- Consensus All-American (1894)

Phillip Tracy "P.T." Stillman (August 13, 1873 – October 16, 1939) was an American football player and insurance executive. He played for the undefeated 1894 Yale Bulldogs football team and was selected as the consensus first-team center on the 1894 College Football All-America Team. He later became president of F. W. Stillman Company, an insurance brokerage company founded by his father.

== Early life ==
Stillman was born in Brooklyn, New York, in 1873. He grew up in Elizabeth, New Jersey. His parents, Franklin W. and Olive Stillman, were both natives of New York. His father was employed in the insurance business. Stillman ended preparatory school at St. Paul's School in Concord, New Hampshire.

== Yale ==
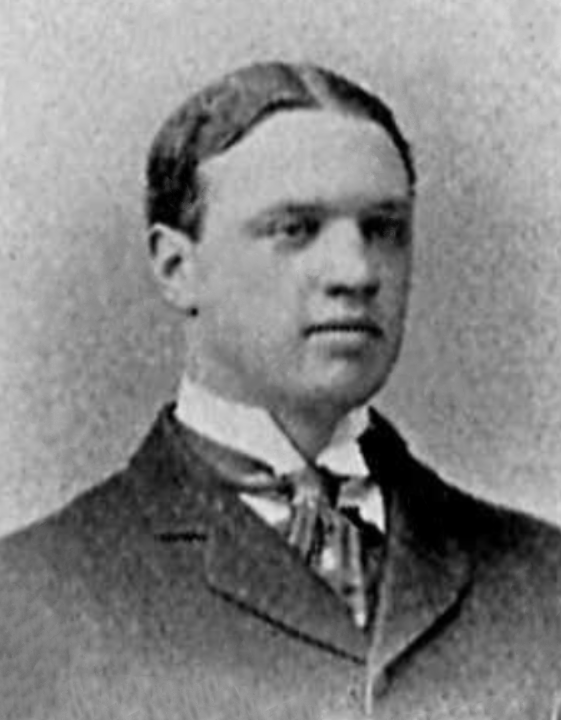
Stillman from Yale's 1895 senior class book

Stillman enrolled at Yale College in approximately 1892 as a transfer student for his junior year. He played for three years on the Yale Bulldogs football team. He was the center on the 1894 Yale Bulldogs football team that compiled a 16–0 record and was retroactively named co-national champions by the Billingsley Report, Helms Athletic Foundation, National Championship Foundation, and Parke H. Davis. At the end of the 1894 season, Stillman was a consensus choice as a first-team player on the 1894 College Football All-America Team. Caspar Whitney, published in Harper's Weekly magazine, and Leslie's Weekly by John D. Merrill.

Stillman graduated from Yale's Sheffield Scientific School in 1895, having studied mechanical engineering. He was a member of St. Anthony Hall, Delta Phi, the Renaissance Club and the Dance Committee, and served as chairman of the supper committee. He was also a member of the track and field team. Reference to Stillman in the 1895 Yale senior class book refer to his heavy weight. Noting that Stillman claimed to trace his ancestry to Sir Francis Drake, the class book notes: "If any of P.T.'s distinguished relatives ever manage to circumnavigate him in the same time that Sir Francis did the earth, they will find themselves equally famous." Also appended to his biography in the class book was this quote: "Falstaff sweats to death, And lards the lean earth as he walks along."

== Later life ==
After leaving Yale, Stillman was employed in the elevator business. He also served in the New York National Guard, holding the rank of captain in the 101st Cavalry.

From 1900 to 1920, Stillman lived with his parents in Elizabeth, New Jersey. In 1900, he was employed as a shipping clerk. In 1910, he was working as an automobile salesman. In 1912, he was in charge of the New York office of Corbin Motor Vehicle Corporation. By 1917, he had entered the insurance business and was employed by his father's company, the F. W. Stillman Co., at 80 Maiden Lane in New York City. In 1920, he was vice president of his father's company, and he later became president of the company after his father died.

In 1930, Stillman lived in Fairfield, Connecticut. He was married in October, 1934 to Helen Strong Piffard at Winter Park, Florida. In 1935, he was living in Winter Park with his wife, though he maintained his principal home in his later years at Weston, Connecticut.

Stillman died in 1939 at the age of 66 at New York Hospital.
