= 1891 Columbia football team =

American college football season

1891 Columbia football
- Conference: Independent
- Record: 1–5
- Head coach: None
- Captain: T. Ludlow Chrystie
- Home stadium: Columbia Grounds

1891 Eastern college football independents records
	Conf.			Overall
Team	W	L	T	W		L		T
Yale		–		13	–	0	–	0
Harvard		–		13	–	1	–	0
Princeton		–		12	–	1	–	0
Tufts		–		7	–	1	–	0
Penn		–		11	–	2	–	0
Colgate		–		4	–	1	–	0
Army		–		4	–	1	–	1
Bucknell		–		6	–	2	–	1
Navy		–		5	–	2	–	0
Cornell		–		7	–	3	–	0
Geneva		–		4	–	2	–	0
Washington & Jefferson		–		4	–	2	–	0
Lehigh		–		7	–	4	–	0
Rutgers		–		8	–	6	–	0
Brown		–		4	–	6	–	0
Springfield YMCA		–		5	–	8	–	1
Fordham		–		1	–	2	–	1
Syracuse		–		4	–	7	–	0
Massachusetts		–		2	–	5	–	0
Western Univ. Penn.		–		2	–	6	–	0
Lafayette		–		2	–	9	–	1
NYU		–		1	–	4	–	0
Columbia		–		1	–	5	–	0
Wesleyan		–		1	–	6	–	0

The 1891 Columbia football team was an American football team that represented Columbia University as an independent during the 1891 college football season. The team compiled a 1–5 record and was outscored by a total of 220 to 32. The team had no coach. T. Ludlow Chrystie served as team captain.

== Schedule ==
Date	Time	Opponent	Site	Result	Attendance	Source
October 10		Berkeley Athletic Club	Columbia Grounds; Bronx, NY	W 32–0		
October 14	4:30 p.m.	Manhattan Athletic Club	Columbia Grounds; Bronx, NY	L 0–28		
October 17		at Crescent Athletic Club	Eastern Park; Brooklyn, NY	L 0–42		
October 21		at Stevens	St. George's Cricket Club grounds; Hoboken, NJ	L 0–52	500	
October 24		Trinity (CT)	Columbia Grounds; Bronx, NY	L 0–54		
October 28		at Rutgers	New Brunswick, NJ	L 0–44		
