= William M. Richards =

American football player and coach

William Richards
Biographical details
- Born: March 31, 1873; New Haven, Connecticut, U.S.

Playing career
- 1891–1893: Yale

Coaching career (HC unless noted)
- 1895: Oberlin
- 1898: Bowdoin

William Martin Richards (born March 31, 1873) was an American college football player and coach. He served as the head football coach at Oberlin College in 1895 and Bowdoin College in 1898.
