= William C. Mackie =

American football player and coach (1870–1931)

Biographical details
- Born: October 1, 1870; Boston, Massachusetts, U.S.
- Died: August 1, 1931 (aged 60); Brookline, Massachusetts, U.S.

Playing career
- 1891–1894: Harvard

Coaching career (HC unless noted)
- 1895–1896: Bowdoin

Head coaching record
- Overall: 3–3–1

Accomplishments and honors

Championships
- 1 MIAA (1895)

Awards
- 1894 College Football All-American

William Charles Mackie (October 1, 1870 – August 1, 1931) was an American college football player and coach. He was an All-American guard at Harvard University and served as the head football coach at Bowdoin College. After football, Mackie practiced medicine and served as medical examiner for Norfolk County, Massachusetts.

== Early life ==
Mackie was born on October 1, 1870, in Boston to William B. and Mary Ann Mackie. He attended Boston Latin School and graduated from Harvard College in 1894 and Harvard Medical School in 1898.

== Football ==
Mackie played for the Harvard Crimson football team from 1891 to 1894. Before his first season with the team, Walter Camp described Mackie as "strong and active, knows what is required of him in both offence and defence, particularly the latter, and would steady up Harvard's center more than any man that could be selected". He started his sophomore year at center, but was moved to right guard before the 1892 Harvard-Yale game due to an injury to R. G. Acton. Mackie remained at right guard in 1893, while Acton moved to left guard. Mackie was named to the 1894 College Football All-America Team by John D. Merrill of Leslie's Weekly and S. V. R. Crosby of The Boston Daily Globe.

In 1895, Mackie coached the Bowdoin College football team. In October 1896, Mackie again became Bowdoin's coach. He took over for William Hoag, who left the team after three games. Bowdoin finished the season with a 5–3–2 overall record and a 3–3–1 under Mackie.

== Medicine ==
After graduating from medical school, Mackie worked as a general practitioner in Boston. In 1904 he moved to Brookline, Massachusetts, and began practicing there. In 1912 he was appointed associate medical examiner for the 8th Norfolk District. During World War I, Mackie also served as Brookline's draft board examiner and was a member of the Volunteer Medical Corps. In February 1918, Mackie was appointed medical examiner of Norfolk County by Governor Samuel W. McCall. He was reappointed in 1925.

== Personal life ==
Mackie married Gerda Hooper Erickson on November 30, 1916. The couple had two daughters. He was a member of the General Church of the New Jerusalem. Mackie died on August 1, 1931, at his home in Brookline.
