= Anson M. Beard =

American football player (1874–1929)

Yale Bulldogs
- Position: Tackle

Personal information
- Born: March 17, 1874; Richmond, Virginia, U.S.
- Died: November 9, 1929 (aged 55); Tuxedo Park, New York, U.S.

Career information
- College: Yale University (1891–1894)

Awards and highlights
- College Football All-American (1894)

Anson McCook Beard (March 17, 1874 – November 9, 1929) was an American football player.

A native of Richmond, Virginia, Beard played college football for Yale. He joined the school in 1891, and was part of four consecutive national championships between that year and 1894. Mid-season of 1894, Beard left the Yale football team, saying he "cannot spare the time from his studies for athletics" and that his father objected to football. Despite missing nearly half of the season, Beard was named to the College Football All-America team following the season, in which Yale compiled a 16–0 record.

After his playing career, Beard became a lawyer.

In 1902, he married Ruth Hill, the daughter of Canadian-American railway executive James J. Hill. They had two children, Anson McCook Jr. and Mary. Photographer Peter Beard was his grandson.

He died on November 9, 1929, in Tuxedo Park, New York.
