= 1891 college football season =

American college football season

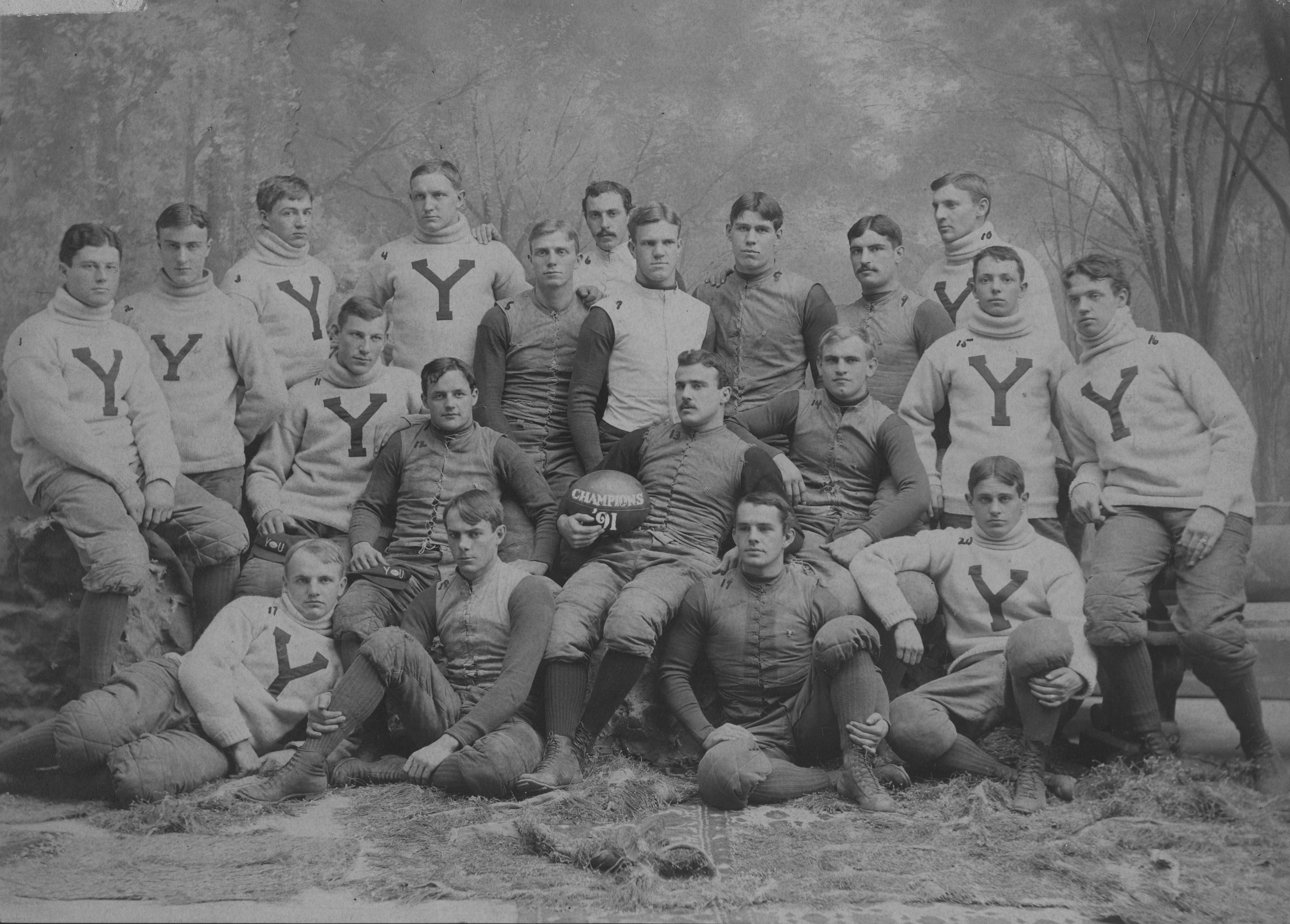
- 1891 Yale Bulldogs
- Champion: Yale

The 1891 college football season was the season of American football played among colleges and universities in the United States during the 1891–92 academic year.

The 1891 Yale Bulldogs football team, led by head coach Walter Camp, compiled a perfect 13–0 record, outscored opponents by a total of 488 to 0, and has been recognized as the national champion by the Billingsley Report, Helms Athletic Foundation, Houlgate System, National Championship Foundation, and Parke H. Davis. Yale's 1891 season was part of a 37-game winning streak that began at the end of the 1890 season and continued into the 1893 season.

In the Midwest, Kansas led the way with a 7–0–1 record. In the South, Trinity (now known as Duke) was recognized as the champion.

Ten of the eleven players selected by Caspar Whitney to the 1891 All-America college football team came from the Big Three (Yale, Harvard, and Princeton). The eleventh player was center John Adams from Penn. Five of the honorees have been inducted into the College Football Hall of Fame: quarterback Philip King (Princeton), halfback Lee McClung (Yale), end Frank Hinkey (Yale), tackle Marshall Newell (Harvard), and guard Pudge Heffelfinger (Yale).

== Conference and program changes ==
School	1890 conference	1891 conference
Case football	Program established	Independent
Sewanee Tigers	Program established	Independent
Tennessee Volunteers	Program established	Independent
West Virginia Mountaineers	Program established	Independent

== Awards and honors ==
=== All-Americans ===
The consensus All-America team included:

Position	Name	Height	Weight (lbs.)	Class	Hometown	Team
QB	Philip King	5'6"	154	So.	Washington, D. C.	Princeton
HB	Everett J. Lake			Sr.	Woodstock, Connecticut	Harvard
HB	Bum McClung	5'10"	165	Sr.	Knoxville, Tennessee	Yale
FB	Sheppard Homans, Jr.			Sr.	Englewood, New Jersey	Princeton
E	Frank Hinkey	5'9"	150	Fr.	Tonawanda, New York	Yale
T	Wallace Winter			Jr.	Hudson, Wisconsin	Yale
G	Pudge Heffelfinger	6'4"	178	Sr.	Minneapolis, Minnesota	Yale
C	John Adams			Sr.		Penn
G	Jesse Riggs			Sr.	Baltimore, Maryland	Princeton
T	Marshall Newell	5'7"	168	So.	Great Barrington, Massachusetts	Harvard
E	John A. Hartwell			Sr.	Sussex, New Jersey	Yale

=== Statistical leaders ===
- Player scoring most points: Bernard Trafford, Harvard, 270

== Conference standings ==
The following is a potentially incomplete list of conference standings:

1891 Colorado Football Association standings
	Conf.			Overall
Team	W	L	T	W		L		T
Colorado Mines $		–		5	–	1	–	1
$ – Conference champion

1891 Eastern Intercollegiate Football Association standings
	Conf.					Overall
Team	W		L		T	W		L		T
Williams $	3	–	0	–	1	8	–	2	–	1
Amherst	2	–	0	–	2	8	–	4	–	3
Dartmouth	2	–	1	–	1	2	–	2	–	1
Boston Tech	1	–	3	–	0	5	–	7	–	2
Stevens	0	–	4	–	0	3	–	7	–	0
$ – Conference champion

1891 Indiana Intercollegiate Athletic Association football standings
	Conf.					Overall
Team	W		L		T	W		L		T
Purdue $	4	–	0	–	0	4	–	0	–	0
Butler	3	–	2	–	0	4	–	3	–	0
Wabash	1	–	3	–	0	1	–	3	–	0
Indiana	0	–	5	–	0	1	–	5	–	0
$ – Conference champion

1891 Pennsylvania Intercollegiate Football Association standings
	Conf.					Overall
Team	W		L		T	W		L		T
Penn State $	4	–	1	–	0	6	–	2	–	0
Bucknell	3	–	1	–	1	6	–	2	–	1
Swarthmore	3	–	2	–	0	9	–	2	–	0
Franklin & Marshall	2	–	2	–	0	2	–	4	–	0
Dickinson	1	–	2	–	1	2	–	3	–	1
Haverford	0	–	5	–	0	0	–	6	–	0
$ – Conference champion

=== Independents ===
1891 Eastern college football independents records
	Conf.			Overall
Team	W	L	T	W		L		T
Yale		–		13	–	0	–	0
Harvard		–		13	–	1	–	0
Princeton		–		12	–	1	–	0
Tufts		–		7	–	1	–	0
Penn		–		11	–	2	–	0
Colgate		–		4	–	1	–	0
Army		–		4	–	1	–	1
Bucknell		–		6	–	2	–	1
Navy		–		5	–	2	–	0
Cornell		–		7	–	3	–	0
Geneva		–		4	–	2	–	0
Washington & Jefferson		–		4	–	2	–	0
Lehigh		–		7	–	4	–	0
Rutgers		–		8	–	6	–	0
Brown		–		4	–	6	–	0
Springfield YMCA		–		5	–	8	–	1
Fordham		–		1	–	2	–	1
Syracuse		–		4	–	7	–	0
Massachusetts		–		2	–	5	–	0
Western Univ. Penn.		–		2	–	6	–	0
Lafayette		–		2	–	9	–	1
NYU		–		1	–	4	–	0
Columbia		–		1	–	5	–	0
Wesleyan		–		1	–	6	–	0

1891 Midwestern college football independents records
	Conf.			Overall
Team	W	L	T	W		L		T
Ohio Wesleyan		–		4	–	0	–	0
Kansas		–		7	–	0	–	1
Illinois		–		5	–	1	–	0
Missouri		–		3	–	1	–	0
Lake Forest		–		6	–	2	–	0
Washington University		–		4	–	1	–	1
Minnesota		–		3	–	1	–	1
Wisconsin		–		3	–	1	–	1
Cincinnati		–		4	–	2	–	1
Iowa		–		3	–	2	–	0
Doane		–		2	–	2	–	0
Iowa College		–		1	–	1	–	1
Miami (OH)		–		1	–	1	–	0
Nebraska		–		2	–	2	–	0
Northwestern		–		2	–	2	–	3
Michigan		–		4	–	5	–	0
Ohio State		–		2	–	3	–	0
Case		–		1	–	2	–	0
Buchtel		–		1	–	3	–	0
Washburn		–		1	–	5	–	0
Michigan State Normal		–		0	–	2	–	0

1891 Southern college football independents records
	Conf.			Overall
Team	W	L	T	W		L		T
Trinity (NC)		–		3	–	0	–	0
Wake Forest		–		1	–	0	–	0
VMI		–		3	–	0	–	1
Vanderbilt		–		3	–	1	–	0
Navy		–		5	–	2	–	0
Virginia		–		2	–	1	–	2
Delaware		–		5	–	3	–	1
Kentucky State College		–		1	–	1	–	0
Georgetown		–		2	–	2	–	0
Sewanee		–		1	–	2	–	0
Central (KY)		–		0	–	1	–	0
Furman		–		0	–	1	–	0
Tennessee		–		0	–	1	–	0
West Virginia		–		0	–	1	–	0
Johns Hopkins		–		0	–	2	–	0
North Carolina		–		0	–	2	–	0
Richmond		–		0	–	2	–	0

1891 Far West college football independents records
	Conf.			Overall
Team	W	L	T	W		L		T
Stanford		–		3	–	1	–	0
California (spring)		–		4	–	2	–	0
Washington		–		1	–	1	–	0
USC		–		1	–	2	–	0
Colorado		–		1	–	4	–	0
California		–		0	–	1	–	0
