= 1888 Chicago University club football team =

American college football season

1888 Chicago University club football
- Conference: Independent
- Record: 2–2
- Head coach: None
- Captain: B. B. Lamb

The 1888 Chicago University club football team was an American football team that represented the University Club of Chicago, an organization of college graduates living in the Chicago area, in the 1888 college football season. Most of the team were businessmen who had played football on the Harvard, Yale, Princeton, and Columbia football teams.

== Schedule ==
Date	Time	Opponent	Site	Result	Attendance
		English team of Chicago Residents	Chicago, IL	W	
November 21		Harvard Prep School	Chicago, IL	L 0–12	
November 24		Harvard Prep School	Chicago, IL	L 0–12	
November 29	2:15 p.m.	Michigan	Chicago Baseball Park; Chicago, IL	W 26–4	3,000

The contest against Harvard Prep on November 21 was seen as a practice game, and so the Harvard team doesn't recognize it

== Roster ==
The roster for the Thanksgiving Day contest against Michigan consisted of:

- A. Farwell, right end
- Harry Hamlin, right tackle
- B. B. Lamb, right guard (captain)
- Peters, center
- Burke, left guard
- A. S. Bickham, left tackle
- Lockwood, left end
- P. Hamlin, quarterback
- W. Crawford, right halfback
- J. Wallerm left halfback
- J. Cowling, fullback
- Eldridge, substitute
