= Quine =

Quine may refer to:

- Quine (computing), a program that produces its source code as output
- Quine's paradox, in logic
- Quine (surname), people with the surname
  - Willard Van Orman Quine (1908–2000), American philosopher and logician

== See also ==
- Quine–McCluskey algorithm, an algorithm used for logic minimization
- Duhem–Quine thesis or Duhem–Quine problem, in philosophy of science
- Quine–Putnam indispensability argument, in the philosophy of mathematics
