= Quiner =

Quiner is a surname. Notable people with the surname include:

- Caroline Quiner (1839–1924), birth name of Caroline Ingalls, mother of Laura Ingalls Wilder
- Joanna Quiner (1796–1868), American seamstress and sculptor

== See also ==
- Quine (surname)
