= 1888 Northwestern Purple football team =

American college football season

1888 Northwestern Purple football
- Conference: Independent
- Record: 2–1
- Head coach: None
- Captain: A. H. Henry

1888 Midwestern college football independents records
	Conf.			Overall
Team	W	L	T	W		L		T
Cincinnati		–		1	–	0	–	1
Notre Dame		–		1	–	0	–	0
Washington University		–		1	–	0	–	0
Michigan		–		2	–	1	–	0
Northwestern		–		2	–	1	–	0
Lake Forest		–		2	–	2	–	0
Minnesota		–		1	–	1	–	0
Indiana		–		0	–	0	–	1
Miami (OH)		–		0	–	0	–	1
Albion		–		0	–	2	–	0

The 1888 Northwestern Purple football team was an American football team that represented Northwestern University during the 1888 college football season. Prior to 1888, Northwestern had played only four football games spread over 12 years and had never put together a winning record. The 1888 Northwestern team compiled a 2–1 record. The team opened its season on November 22, 1888, with a 16–6 victory over Chicago West Division High School and concluded with two games against Lake Forest College. Lake Forest won the first game, 18–4, in Lake Forest, Illinois, on November 24, 1888. Northwestern won the latter game, 12–6, at Evanston on December 1, 1888.

== Schedule ==
Date	Opponent	Site	Result	Source
November 20	West Division High School		W 16–6	
November 24	at Lake Forest	Evanston, IL	L 4–18	
December 1	Lake Forest	Evanston, IL	W 12–6	
