= 1888 Indiana Hoosiers football team =

American college football season

1888 Indiana Hoosiers football
- Conference: Independent
- Record: 0–0–1
- Head coach: Arthur B. Woodford (2nd season)
- Captain: William Boss

1888 Midwestern college football independents records
	Conf.			Overall
Team	W	L	T	W		L		T
Cincinnati		–		1	–	0	–	1
Notre Dame		–		1	–	0	–	0
Washington University		–		1	–	0	–	0
Michigan		–		2	–	1	–	0
Northwestern		–		2	–	1	–	0
Lake Forest		–		2	–	2	–	0
Minnesota		–		1	–	1	–	0
Indiana		–		0	–	0	–	1
Miami (OH)		–		0	–	0	–	1
Albion		–		0	–	2	–	0

The 1888 Indiana Hoosiers football team was an American football team that represented Indiana University Bloomington during the 1888 college football season. In Indiana's second season of intercollegiate football, economics professor Arthur B. Woodford returned as the school's football coach. As in 1887, Indiana played only one game, that game ending in a 6–6 tie with the team from nearby DePauw University at Greencastle, Indiana. The players on the 1888 team included Joseph W. Murphy, John C. Capron, and J. F. Newsom.

== Schedule ==
Opponent	Site	Result
DePauw	Unknown	T game tied; score unknown
