= Isaac Sims =

Illinois state legislator

Isaac R. Sims (February 14, 1914 – June 24, 1976) was a state legislator in Illinois. He graduated from McKinley High School and the Northwest School of Commerce. He served in Illinois House of Representatives from 1967 to 1975. He ran into financial and legal trouble and Jet reported he declared bankruptcy owing $2 million. Sims died June 24, 1976 in St Bernard's Hospital in Chicago from a heart attack.

== See also ==
- Isaac Carothers
