= 1888 Cincinnati football team =

American college football season

1888 Cincinnati football
- Conference: Independent
- Record: 1–0–1
- Head coach: None
- Captain: Arch Carson

1888 Midwestern college football independents records
	Conf.			Overall
Team	W	L	T	W		L		T
Cincinnati		–		1	–	0	–	1
Notre Dame		–		1	–	0	–	0
Washington University		–		1	–	0	–	0
Michigan		–		2	–	1	–	0
Northwestern		–		2	–	1	–	0
Lake Forest		–		2	–	2	–	0
Minnesota		–		1	–	1	–	0
Indiana		–		0	–	0	–	1
Miami (OH)		–		0	–	0	–	1
Albion		–		0	–	2	–	0

The 1888 Cincinnati football team was an American football team that represented the University of Cincinnati as an independent during the 1888 college football season. The team compiled a 1–0–1 record. Arch Carson was the team captain. The team had no head coach.

== Schedule ==
Date	Opponent	Site	Result	Source
November 29	Walnut Hills Gym	Cincinnati, OH	W 8–6	
December 8	at Miami (OH)	Old Main lawn; Oxford, OH (rivalry)	T 0–0	
