= Lincoln MacMillan =

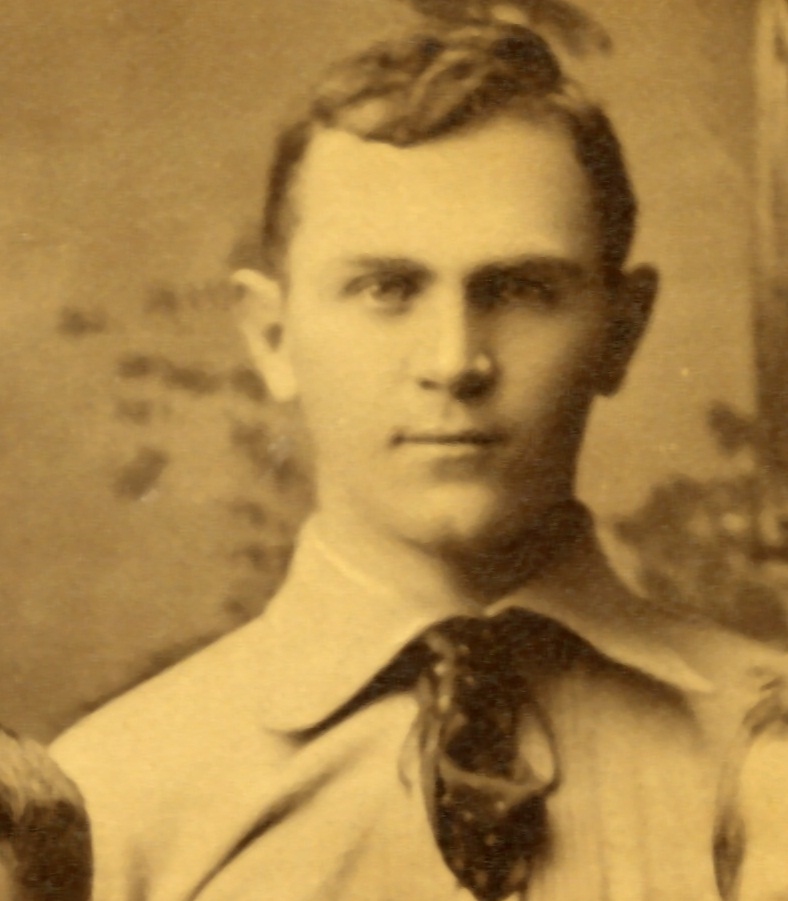
- MacMillan in 1886
- Born: c. 1864; Ann Arbor, Michigan
- Died: September 12, 1950; Ann Arbor, Michigan

Lincoln C. MacMillan (c. 1864 – September 12, 1950) was an American baseball and football player and newspaper editor. He played football and baseball for the University of Michigan and served as an editor at several Chicago newspapers, including the Chicago Record Herald and Chicago Daily News for more than 40 years.

== Early years and athletic career ==
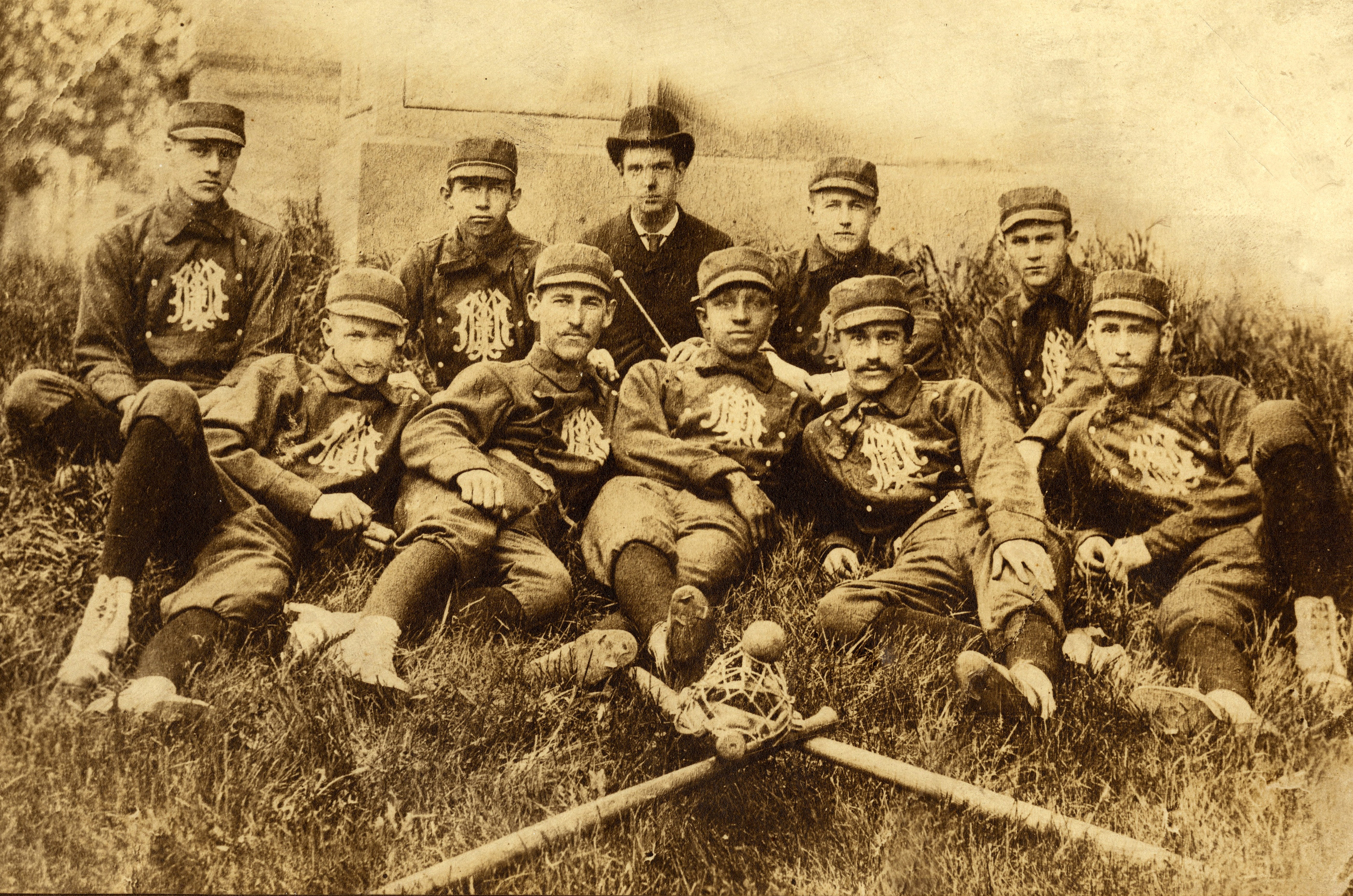
1883 Michigan baseball team, MacMillan in back row, far right

Born in Ann Arbor, Michigan, MacMillan attended the University of Michigan where he played on the school's baseball and football teams. He began playing for the baseball team in 1883 as the starting right fielder. In 1884, he was the team's starting third baseman. He returned to the baseball team in 1887 as a pitcher and third baseman. He led the team with a .552 batting average in 1887, and he also developed a reputation for his "swift pitching." MacMillan also served as the captain of the 1887 baseball team. After the 1887 season, MacMillan was recognized as one of "the best players ever in the University." MacMillan played a fourth year for Michigan in 1888 as a second baseman.

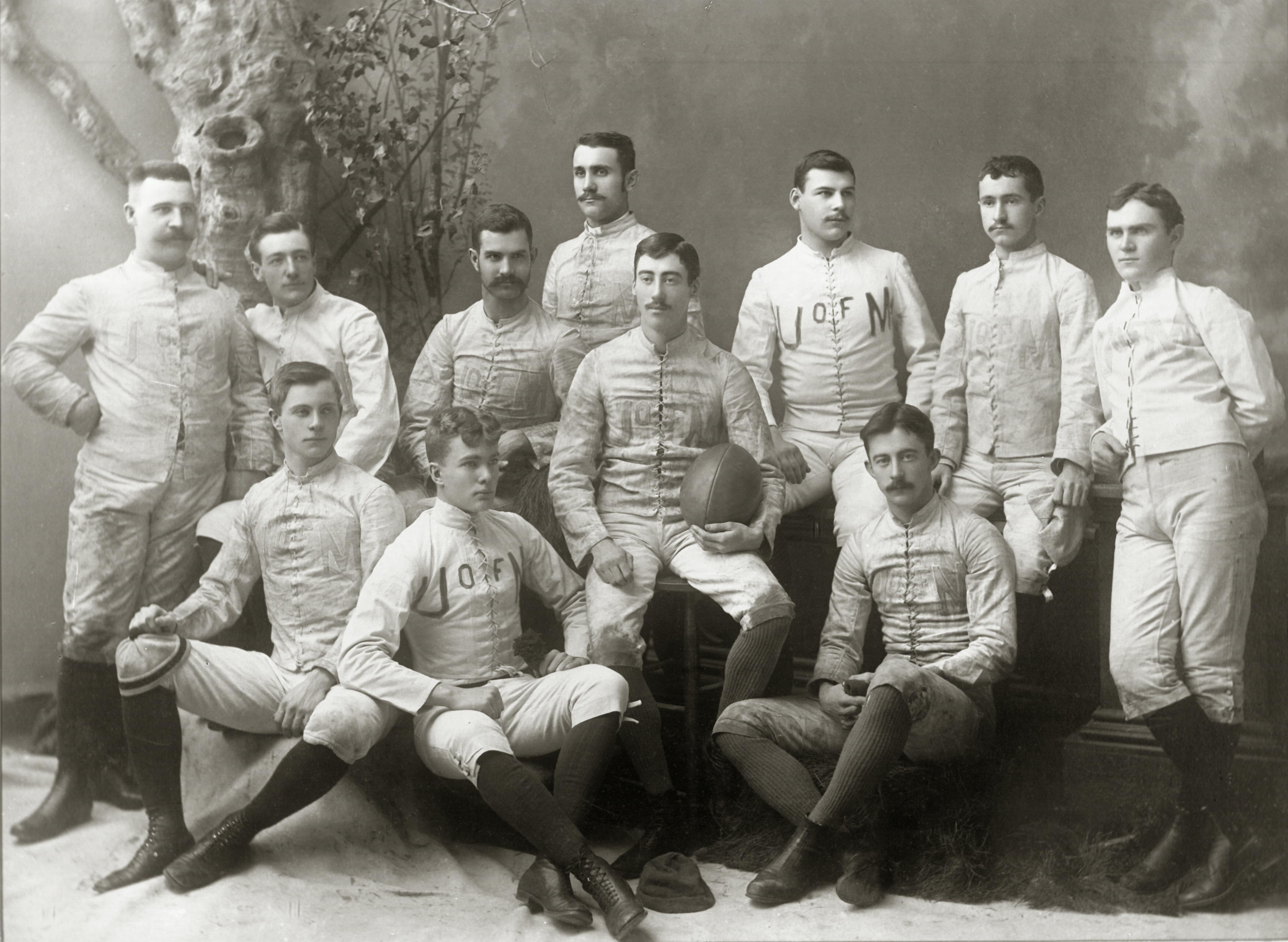
1887 Michigan football team, MacMillan at far right in back row

MacMillan also played on the Michigan football teams that began the football rivalry with Notre Dame with five consecutive victories. MacMillan was the starting right end on the undefeated 1887 Michigan Wolverines football team that won three games against Notre Dame and outscored all opponents 102 to 10. He switched to left end for the 1888 Michigan Wolverines football team that won two games against Notre Dame and compiled a 4–1 record while outscoring opponents 130 to 46. During MacMillan's two years as a starting end, the Wolverines compiled a 9–1 record and outscored opponents 232 to 56.

MacMillan graduated from Michigan with the Class of 1890.

== Newspaper career ==
After graduating from Michigan, MacMillan went into the newspaper business in Chicago. He began his career with stints at Chicago's Evening Post and Times-Herald. In 1912, he became the financial editor of the Chicago Record Herald. In 1919, he joined the Chicago Daily News where he remained for 18 years, holding positions as associate editor and financial editor.

== Later years ==
Sumner retired from the newspaper business in 1937 and returned to his home town of Ann Arbor in retirement. He died in Ann Arbor in September 1950.
