= Benton Grammar School =

- U.S. National Register of Historic Places
- Location: Kansas City, Missouri
- Built: 1868 (original site); 1904 (new site)
- Architect: Charles Ashley Smith
- Architectural style: Renaissance Revival
- NRHP reference No.: 86001204
- Added to NRHP: 1986

The Benton Grammar School (later renamed the "D.A. Holmes School") was a K–8 public school in Kansas City, Missouri. Originally opened in 1868 as a whites-only school, the school was converted to an all-black school in 1953. The school is perhaps best known as the alma mater of American animator and producer Walt Disney, who attended the school from 1910 to 1917.

== History ==
The first Benton Grammar School building was built in 1868 and named in honor of Thomas Hart Benton, who represented Missouri in the United States Senate from 1821 to 1851. The original site of the school was at the corner of Liberty and 14th streets in Kansas City. The school was originally a whites-only school.

In 1904, a new three-story school building was constructed with yellow brick and had 12 classrooms and a kindergarten room. The building was Renaissance Revival architecture and was located at Benton Boulevard in Kansas City, and was formally opened on September 12, 1904. The school enrolled students from kindergarten/pre-K (age 5–6) to 8th grade (up to age 14). In 1921, 8 additional classrooms were added to the school due to an increase in enrollment. By that year, there were approximately 1,300 students enrolled in the school.

During the period of school segregation in the United States, the Kansas City School District converted the school to a Black school in the early 1950s. The move was strongly opposed by White families in the area, and over 500 white families protested the change. During this period, an arsonist set fire to the school, likely due to the conversion of the school to serve African American students.

In 1953, the school was renamed and dedicated as the D.A. Holmes School in honor of the Reverend D.A. Holmes, a local African American Baptist minister and civil rights leader in Kansas City.

In 1986, the school was listed on the National Register of Historic Places as part of the Santa Fe Place Historic District.

The school closed in June 1997 and the building was later converted to the D.A. Holmes Senior Apartments, operated by Fairway Management, Inc.

=== Walt Disney ===
The Benton School is perhaps best known as the alma mater of American animator and producer Walt Disney, who attended the school from 1910 to 1917. The 1931 edition of "The Bentonion" school yearbook includes a six-paragraph tribute letter written to the school from Disney. Disney credited the Benton School and his favorite teacher, Daisy Beck, for fostering his creativity and love for cartoons and storytelling.

In 1938, Disney invited the entire student body of the school to see a screening of Snow White and the Seven Dwarfs for free. In 1942, Disney returned to the Benton School for a reunion, and a dedication of a new Works Progress Administration mural in the school's hallways to commemorate Disney's education and upbringing in Kansas City. The voice of Donald Duck, Clarence Nash, also accompanied Disney for the festivities.

== Notable alumni ==
- Walt Disney, American animator and producer (1901–1966), attended the school from 1910–1917
- Ginger Rogers, American actress and dancer (1911–1995), attended the school for kindergarten
- La’Verne Washington, American songwriter and soul artist
