= Chicago High School =

Defunct high school in Chicago, Illinois

Coordinates: 41°52′49.90″N 87°38′44.40″W

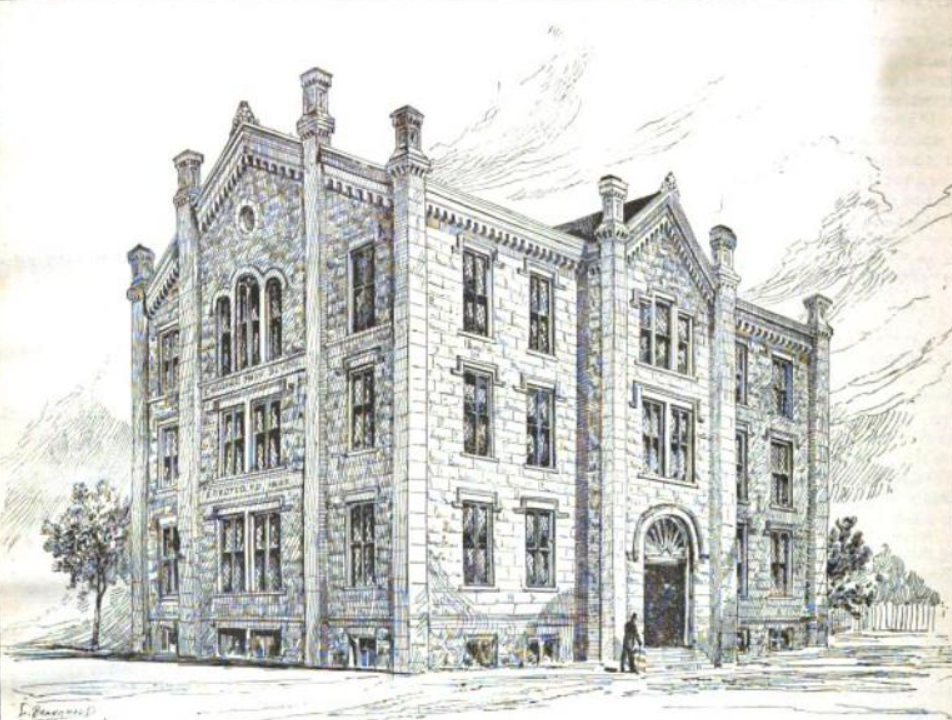
- Chicago, Illinois; United States

Information
- Established: 1856
- Closed: 1880

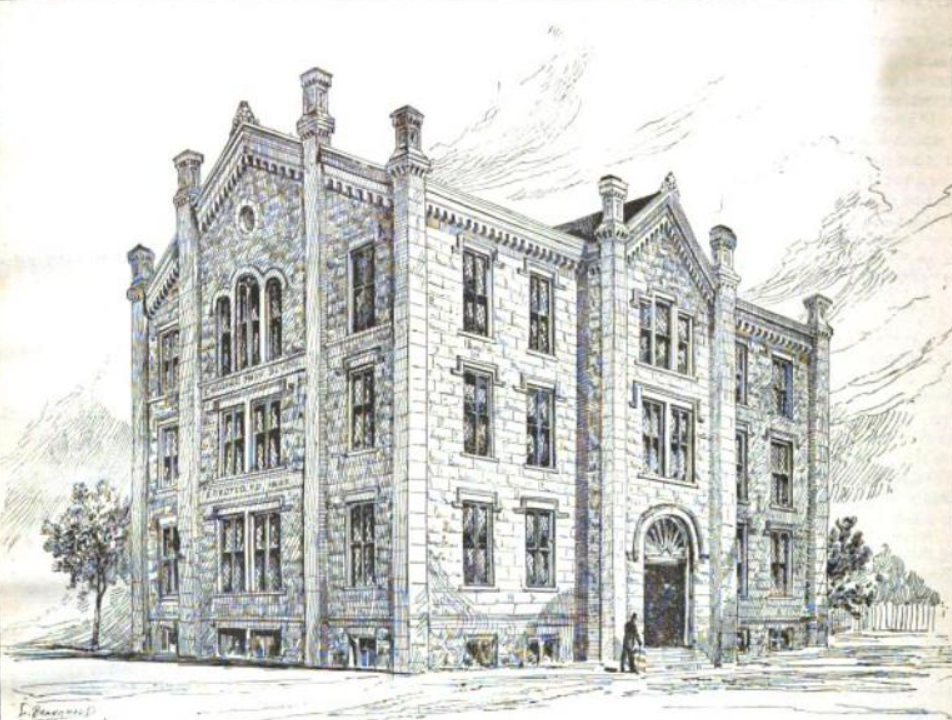

Chicago High School (active 1856–1880; demolished 1950) was the first public high school in Chicago, Illinois. After several abortive attempts, the Chicago City Council approved a high school in 1855. John M. Van Osdel and Frederick Baumann designed the building, which opened the next year. In 1860, the coursework was organized into two branches of study. In 1869, the high school established three branch divisions in Chicago where students could take the first-year workload, then apply to finish at the main building, which then became known as Central High School. These branches evolved into full high schools in 1880 and the original Chicago High School was closed. The building was demolished in 1950.

== History ==
The first proposal for a high school in Chicago, Illinois dates from 1840. The Chicago Board of Inspectors met to discuss the advanced schooling provided by some schools in the city and considered centralizing secondary education. However, no action was taken. Three years later, the Inspectors issued a report about the possibility of a high school, but bemoaned the lack of funds available to organize it. In May 1844, chairman Ira Miltimore proposed the erection of a new school in the First Ward. This school was to have elementary teaching in the two rooms on the first floor and a high school in the rooms on the second floor. Thus, one principal and only two or three assistants could essentially lead two schools at once. The proposal seems to have been ignored.

Three Inspectors organized a committee to plan the first high school in November 1852. They issued a report that December, but again the issue was ignored. Finally, in September 1854, the Chicago City Council agreed to pass an ordinance approving a high school. It was made law on January 23, 1855. On February 19, they ordered a draft of the building plans and the building was begun later that year. The building was located on Monroe Street, between Halsted and Desplaines Streets.

John M. Van Osdel and Frederick Baumann were tasked with planning the structure. They designed a Gothic Revival building faced with ashlar limestone. It had diamond-shaped leaded windows and crenelated roof edges. An examination for application was opened on July 15, 1856, with 158 applicants; 114 were admitted. A second examination was held and eleven others were admitted. The school was officially organized on October 8, 1856, and Charles A. Dupee was named the first principal. By the start of the winter term, only fifty-one student were able to maintain a scholarship. The Irving Society, a literary club named for Washington Irving, was founded in 1857.

George Howland succeeded Dupree in 1860. He divided the school into two programs: a two-year normal (teaching preparation) course or a three-year study in the classics. Students could alternatively take both courses over four years. By the winter term, both programs were extended to four years and pupils were required to study at least one foreign language. By 1866, the school featured nine faculty, teaching Latin, German, French, Greek, geography, botany, astronomy, history, Cicero, mensuration (mathematics), natural philosophy, and political economy. In 1868, a special three-year classical course, intended as preparatory school for colleges, was introduced. Age for admission was originally thirteen, but this was reduced to twelve in 1870. The limestone building was one of the few to survive the 1871 Great Chicago Fire.

In September 1869, the high school developed branch schools and classes throughout the city: North Division, South Division and West Division. High school classes were heard in the Franklin School in the north, the Haven school in the south, the Foster and Hayes buildings in the west. Students could take the first year or two of high school in these buildings, then attended the "central" high school for the rest of schooling. Thus, Chicago High School also became known as Central High School after this date. A school newspaper, The Lever, was founded in 1874.

In 1880, the three branch schools became four-year schools and the Central High School was decommissioned. By the time, the high school building was too small for the number of students and the building was out of place in an otherwise commercial district. An unofficial affiliation with the West Division High School was formed, and alumni of the two schools met in joint reunions. The school building was used as a warehouse for the Chicago Board of Education, the successor organization of the Board of Inspectors. In 1950, it was demolished to make room for the Northwest Expressway.

== Alumni ==
- Ferdinand L. Barnett, lawyer and civil rights activist
- Wallace Leroy DeWolf, businessman and artist
- Albert G. Lane, educator
- Cyrus McCormick, Jr., industrialist
- William Morton Payne, educator
- William Edward Quine, physician
- Ella Flagg Young, educator
- Pauline Garrette Kimball, actress
