= Walt Disney =

American animator, producer and entrepreneur (1901–1966)

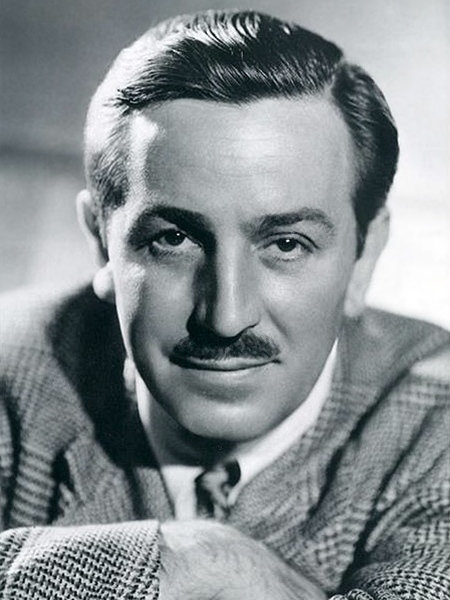
- Disney in 1946
- Born: December 5, 1901; Chicago, Illinois, U.S.
- Died: December 15, 1966 (aged 65); Burbank, California, U.S.
- Resting place: Forest Lawn Memorial Park, Glendale, California, U.S. (ashes)
- Occupations: Animator; film producer; voice actor; entrepreneur
- Years active: 1919–1966
- Title: President of the Walt Disney Company
- Spouse: Lillian Bounds (m. 1925)
- Children: 2, including Diane
- Relatives: Disney family
- Awards: 26 Academy Awards (Note: 22 competitive, 4 honorary); 3 Golden Globe Awards; 1 Emmy Award
- Disney's voice Disney explaining each of the seven dwarfs from the trailer of Snow White and the Seven Dwarfs; Recorded 1937

Walter Elias Disney (/ˈdɪzni/ DIZ-nee; December 5, 1901 – December 15, 1966) was an American animator, film producer, voice actor, and entrepreneur. A pioneer of the American animation industry, he introduced several developments in the production of cartoons. As a film producer, he holds the record for most Academy Awards won by (22) and nominated for (59) an individual. He was presented with two Golden Globe Special Achievement Awards and an Emmy Award, among other honors. Several of his films are included in the National Film Registry by the Library of Congress and have also been named as some of the greatest films ever by the American Film Institute.

Born in Chicago in 1901 and raised largely in Missouri, Disney developed an early interest in drawing. He took art classes as a boy and took a job as a commercial illustrator at the age of 18. He moved to California in the early 1920s and set up the Disney Brothers Studio (now the Walt Disney Company) with his brother Roy. With Ub Iwerks, he developed the character Mickey Mouse in 1928, his first highly popular success; he also provided the voice for his creation in the early years. As the studio grew, he became more adventurous, introducing synchronized sound, full-color three-strip Technicolor, animated feature films and technical developments in cameras. The results, seen in features such as Snow White and the Seven Dwarfs (1937), Pinocchio, Fantasia (both 1940), Dumbo (1941), and Bambi (1942), furthered the development of animated film. New animated and live-action films followed after World War II, including Cinderella (1950), Sleeping Beauty (1959), and Mary Poppins (1964), the last of which received five Academy Awards.

In the 1950s, Disney expanded into the theme park industry, and in July 1955 he opened Disneyland in Anaheim, California. To fund the project he diversified into television programs, such as Walt Disney's Disneyland and The Mickey Mouse Club. He was also involved in planning the 1959 Moscow Fair, the 1960 Winter Olympics, and the 1964 New York World's Fair. In 1965, he began development of another theme park, Disney World, the heart of which was to be a new type of city, the "Experimental Prototype Community of Tomorrow" (EPCOT). Disney was a heavy smoker throughout his life and died of lung cancer in 1966 before either the park or the EPCOT project were completed.

Disney was a shy, self-deprecating and insecure man in private but adopted a warm and outgoing public persona. He had high standards and high expectations of those with whom he worked. Although there have been accusations that he was racist or antisemitic, they have been contradicted by many who knew him. The historiography of Disney has taken a variety of perspectives, ranging from views of him as a purveyor of homely patriotic values to being a representative of American cultural imperialism. Widely considered to be one of the most influential cultural figures of the 20th century, Disney remains an important presence in the history of animation and in the cultural history of the United States, where he is acknowledged as a national cultural icon. His film work continues to be shown and adapted, the Disney theme parks have grown in size and number around the world and his company has grown to become one of the world's largest mass media and entertainment conglomerates.

== Early life and education ==
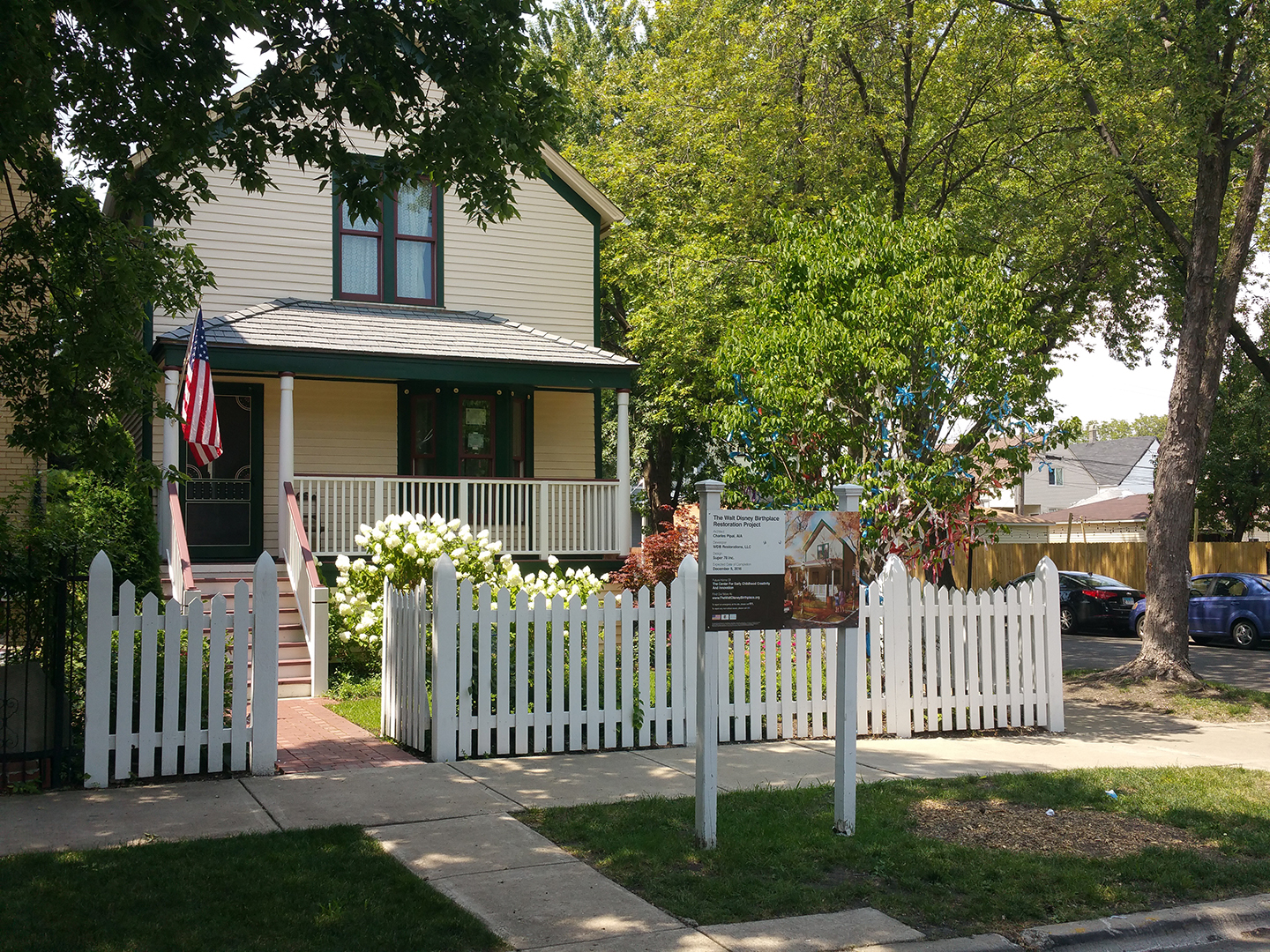
Disney's childhood home in Chicago

Walter Elias Disney was born on December 5, 1901, at 1249 N Tripp Avenue in the Hermosa neighborhood of Chicago, Illinois, United States. (Note: In 1909, in a renumbering exercise, the property's address changed to 2156 North Tripp Avenue.) He was the fourth son of Elias Disney, who was born in the Province of Canada to Anglo-Irish parents, and Flora (née Call), an American of German and English descent. (Note: Disney was a descendant of Robert d'Isigny, a Frenchman who had traveled to England with William the Conqueror in 1066. The family anglicized the d'Isigny name to "Disney" and settled in the English village now known as Norton Disney in Lincolnshire.) Aside from Walt, the sons of Elias and Flora were Herbert, Raymond and Roy; and the couple had a fifth child, Ruth, in December 1903. In 1906, when Disney was four, the family moved to a farm in Marceline, Missouri, where his uncle Robert had just purchased land. In Marceline, Disney developed his interest in drawing when he was paid to draw the horse of a retired neighborhood doctor. Elias was a subscriber to the Appeal to Reason newspaper, and Disney practiced drawing by copying the front-page cartoons of Ryan Walker. He also began to develop an ability to work with watercolors and crayons. He lived near the Atchison, Topeka and Santa Fe Railway line, and became enamored with trains. In late 1909, Disney and Ruth started school at the same time at the Park School in Marceline. The Disney family were active members of a Congregational church. Disney later described his childhood in Marceline as one of the happiest and most formative periods of his life, and drew inspiration from the town for several of his future projects.

In 1911, the Disneys moved to Kansas City, Missouri. There, Disney attended the Benton Grammar School, where he met fellow-student Walter Pfeiffer, who came from a family of theatre fans and introduced him to the world of vaudeville and motion pictures. Before long, Disney was spending more time at the Pfeiffers' house than at home. Elias had purchased a newspaper delivery route for The Kansas City Star and Kansas City Times. Disney and Roy woke up at 4:30 every morning to deliver the Times before school, and repeated the round for the evening Star after school. The schedule was exhausting, and Disney often received poor grades after falling asleep in class, but he continued his paper route for more than six years. He attended Saturday courses at the Kansas City Art Institute and also took a correspondence course in cartooning.

In 1917, Elias bought stock in a Chicago jelly producer, the O-Zell Company, and moved back to Chicago with his family. Disney enrolled at McKinley High School and became the cartoonist of the school newspaper, drawing patriotic pictures about World War I; he also took night courses at the Chicago Academy of Fine Arts.

In mid-1918, Disney attempted to join the United States Army to fight the Germans, but he was rejected as too young. After forging the date of birth on his birth certificate, he joined the Red Cross in September 1918 as an ambulance driver. Disney was shipped to France but arrived in November, after the armistice. He drew cartoons on the side of his ambulance for decoration and had some of his work published in the army newspaper Stars and Stripes.

== Career ==
=== 1919–1928: Early career ===
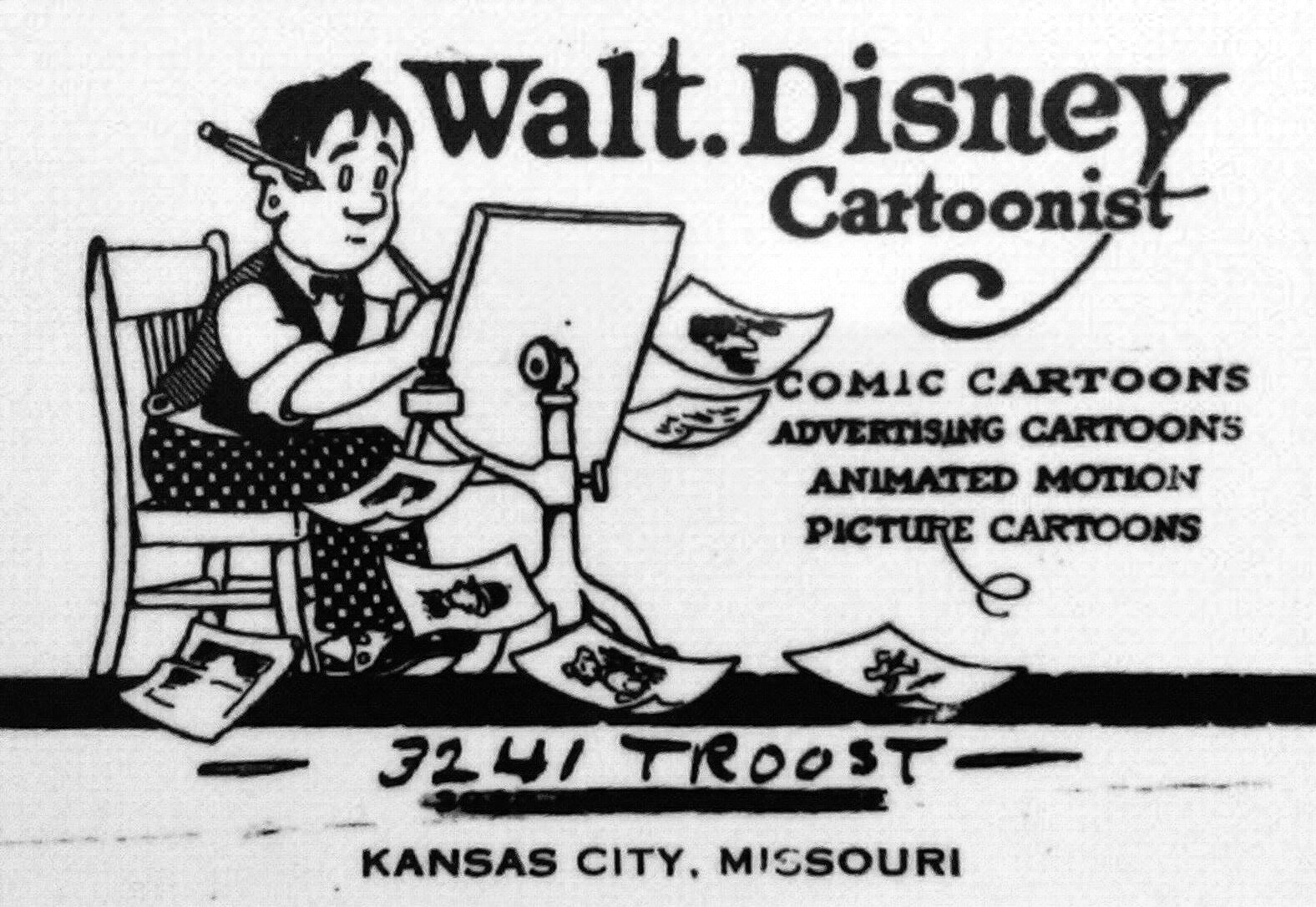
Disney's business envelope featured a self-portrait, c. 1921

He returned to Kansas City in October 1919, where he worked as an apprentice artist at the Pesmen-Rubin Commercial Art Studio, where he drew commercial illustrations for advertising, theater programs and catalogs, and befriended fellow artist Ub Iwerks. In January 1920, as Pesmen-Rubin's revenue declined after Christmas, Disney, aged 18, and Iwerks were laid off.

They started their own business, the short-lived Iwerks-Disney Commercial Artists. Failing to attract many customers, Disney and Iwerks agreed that Disney should leave temporarily to earn money at the Kansas City Film Ad Company, run by A. V. Cauger; the following month Iwerks, who was not able to run their business alone, also joined. The company produced commercials using the cutout animation technique. Disney became interested in animation, although he preferred drawn cartoons such as Mutt and Jeff and Max Fleischer's Out of the Inkwell. With the assistance of a borrowed book on animation and a camera, he began experimenting at home. (Note: The book, Edwin G. Lutz's Animated Cartoons: How They Are Made, Their Origin and Development (1920), was the only one in the local library on the subject; the camera he borrowed from Cauger.) He came to the conclusion that cel animation was more promising than the cutout method. (Note: Cutout animation is the technique of producing cartoons by animating objects cut from paper, material or photographs and photographing them moving incrementally. Cel animation is the method of drawing or painting onto transparent celluloid sheets ("cels"), with each sheet an incremental movement on from the previous.) Unable to persuade Cauger to try cel animation at the company, Disney opened a new business with a co-worker from the Film Ad Co, Fred Harman. Their main client was the local Newman Theater, and the short cartoons they produced were sold as "Newman's Laugh-O-Grams". Disney studied Paul Terry's Aesop's Fables as a model, and the first six "Laugh-O-Grams" were modernized fairy tales.

In May 1921, the success of the "Laugh-O-Grams" led to the establishment of Laugh-O-Gram Studio, for which he hired more animators, including Fred Harman's brother Hugh, Rudolf Ising and Iwerks. The Laugh-O-Grams cartoons did not provide enough income to keep the company solvent, so Disney started production of Alice's Wonderland‍—‌based on Alice's Adventures in Wonderland‍—‌which combined live action with animation; he cast Virginia Davis in the title role. The result, a 12½-minute, one-reel film, was completed too late to save Laugh-O-Gram Studio, which went into bankruptcy in 1923.

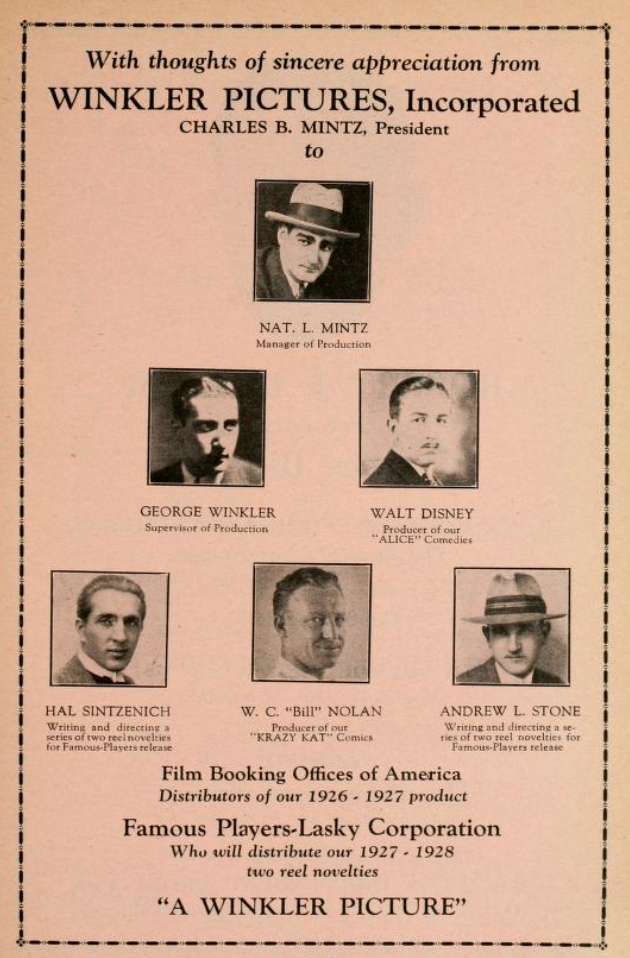
Disney (middle row, right) in a Winkler Pictures advertisement, 1927

Disney moved to Hollywood in July 1923 at 21 years old. Although New York was the center of the cartoon industry, he was attracted to Los Angeles because his brother Roy was convalescing from tuberculosis there, and he hoped to become a live-action film director. Disney's efforts to sell Alice's Wonderland were in vain until he heard from New York film distributor Margaret J. Winkler's Winkler Pictures, whose services was recommended by her former employer, Harry Warner, then president of Warner Bros. Pictures, in response to a letter by Disney. She was losing the rights to both the Out of the Inkwell and Felix the Cat cartoons, and needed a new series. In October, they signed a contract for six Alice comedies, with an option for two further series of six episodes each. Disney and his brother Roy formed the Disney Brothers Studio‍—‌which later became the Walt Disney Company‍—‌to produce the films; they persuaded Davis and her family to relocate to Hollywood to continue production, with Davis on contract at $100 a month. In July 1924, Disney also hired Iwerks, persuading him to relocate to Hollywood from Kansas City. In 1926, the first official Walt Disney Studio was established at 2725 Hyperion Avenue; the building was demolished in 1940.

By 1926, Winkler's role in the production and distribution of the Alice series had been handed over to her husband, the film producer Charles Mintz, and her brother George Winkler; Winkler had dropped their distribution services at this point, finding distributors in FBO and Universal Pictures. The series ran until July 1927, by which time Disney had begun to tire of it and wanted to move away from the mixed format to all animation. After Mintz requested new material to distribute through Universal Pictures, Disney and Iwerks created Oswald the Lucky Rabbit, a character Disney wanted to be "peppy, alert, saucy and venturesome, keeping him also neat and trim". The series was a critical and commercial success for Winkler and Disney, effectively positioning them as a major force in American animation.

In February 1928, Disney hoped to negotiate a larger budget for producing the Oswald series, only to be refused by Mintz after Disney travelled to New York City to confront him. Mintz had also persuaded many of the artists involved to work directly for him, including Harman, Ising, Carman Maxwell and Friz Freleng. Disney also found out that Universal owned the intellectual property rights to Oswald. Mintz threatened to start his own studio and produce the series himself if Disney refused to accept the reductions. Disney declined Mintz's ultimatum and lost most of his animation staff, except Iwerks, who chose to remain with him. (Note: In 2006, the Walt Disney Company finally re-acquired Oswald the Lucky Rabbit when its subsidiary ESPN purchased rights to the character, along with other properties from NBCUniversal.) Universal boss Carl Laemmle later terminated Mintz's contract and allowed Winkler employee Walter Lantz to form an in-house animation studio after Harman and Ising failed to gain control over the series. Disney reacted positively to his news due to his high respect of Lantz's work; the two Walts formed a friendly rivalry that lasted until Disney's death.

=== 1928–1934: Creation of Mickey Mouse and following successes ===
To replace Oswald, Disney and Iwerks developed Mickey Mouse, possibly inspired by a pet mouse that Disney had adopted while working in his Laugh-O-Gram studio, although the origins of the character are unclear. (Note: Several stories about the origins exist. Disney's biographer, Bob Thomas, observes that "The birth of Mickey Mouse is obscured in legend, much of it created by Walt Disney himself.") Disney's original choice of name was Mortimer Mouse, but his wife Lillian thought it too pompous, and suggested Mickey instead. (Note: The name Mortimer Mouse was used in the 1936 cartoon Mickey's Rival as a potential love-interest for Minnie Mouse. He was portrayed as a "humorous denigration of the smooth city slicker" with a smart car, but failed to win over Minnie from the more homespun Mickey.) Iwerks revised Disney's provisional sketches to make the character easier to animate. Disney, who had begun to distance himself from the animation process, provided Mickey's voice until 1947. In the words of one Disney employee, "Ub designed Mickey's physical appearance, but Walt gave him his soul."

The first appearance of Mickey Mouse, in Steamboat Willie (1928)

Mickey Mouse first appeared in May 1928 as a single test screening of the short Plane Crazy, but it, and the second feature, The Gallopin' Gaucho, failed to find a distributor. Following the 1927 sensation The Jazz Singer, Disney used synchronized sound on the third short, Steamboat Willie, to create the first post-produced sound cartoon. After the animation was complete, Disney signed a contract with a former executive of Universal Pictures, Pat Powers, to use the "Powers Cinephone" recording system; Cinephone became the new distributor for Disney's early sound cartoons, which soon became popular.

To improve the quality of the music, Disney hired the professional composer and arranger Carl W. Stalling, on whose suggestion the Silly Symphony series was developed, providing stories through the use of music; the first in the series, The Skeleton Dance (1929), was drawn and animated entirely by Iwerks. Also hired at this time were several artists, both local and from New York. Both the Mickey Mouse and Silly Symphonies series were successful, but Disney and his brother felt they were not receiving their rightful share of profits from Powers. In 1930, Disney tried to trim costs from the process by urging Iwerks to abandon the practice of drawing every frame individually in favor of the more efficient technique of drawing key poses and letting assistants sketch the inbetween poses. Disney asked Powers for an increase in payments for the cartoons. Powers refused and signed Iwerks to work for him; Stalling resigned shortly afterwards, thinking that without Iwerks, the Disney Studio would close. Disney had a nervous breakdown in October 1931, which he blamed on overworking and Powers' business tactics. He and Lillian took an extended holiday to Cuba and a cruise to Panama to recover.

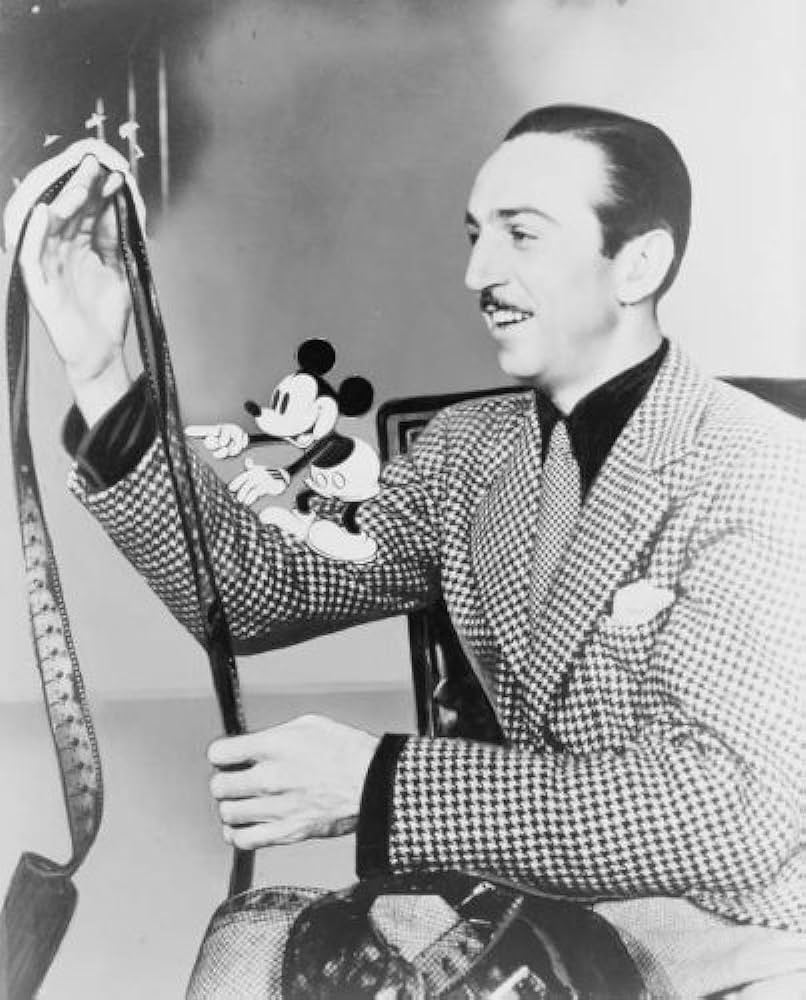
Disney with film roll and Mickey Mouse on his right arm in 1935

With the loss of Powers as distributor, Disney studios signed a contract with Columbia Pictures to distribute the Mickey Mouse cartoons, which became increasingly popular, including internationally. (Note: By 1931 he was called Michael Maus in Germany, Michel Souris in France, Ratón Mickey in Spain and Miki Kuchi in Japan.) Disney and his crew also introduced new cartoon stars like Pluto in 1930, Goofy in 1932 and Donald Duck in 1934. Always keen to embrace new technology and encouraged by his new contract with United Artists, Disney filmed Flowers and Trees (1932) in full-color three-strip Technicolor; he was also able to negotiate a deal giving him the sole right to use the three-strip process until August 31, 1935. All subsequent Silly Symphony cartoons were in color. Flowers and Trees was popular with audiences and won the inaugural Academy Award for best Short Subject (Cartoon) at the 1932 ceremony. Disney had been nominated for another film in that category, Mickey's Orphans, and received an Honorary Award "for the creation of Mickey Mouse".

In 1933, Disney produced The Three Little Pigs, a film described by the media historian Adrian Danks as "the most successful short animation of all time". The film won Disney another Academy Award in the Short Subject (Cartoon) category. The film's success led to a further increase in the studio's staff, which numbered nearly 200 by the end of the year. Disney realized the importance of telling emotionally gripping stories that would interest the audience, and he invested in a "story department" separate from the animators, with storyboard artists who would detail the plots of Disney's films.

=== 1934–1941: Golden age of animation ===
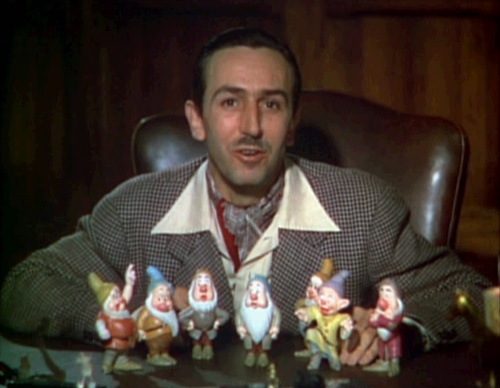
Walt Disney introduces each of the seven dwarfs in a scene from the original 1937 Snow White theatrical trailer

By 1934, Disney had become dissatisfied with producing cartoon shorts, and believed a feature-length cartoon would be more profitable. The studio began the four-year production of Snow White and the Seven Dwarfs, based on the fairy tale. When news leaked out about the project, many in the film industry predicted it would bankrupt the company; industry insiders nicknamed it "Disney's Folly". The film, which was the first animated feature made in full color and sound, cost $1.5 million to produce‍—‌three times over budget. To ensure the animation was as realistic as possible, Disney sent his animators on courses at the Chouinard Art Institute; he brought animals into the studio and hired actors so that the animators could study realistic movement. To portray the changing perspective of the background as a camera moved through a scene, Disney's animators developed a multiplane camera which allowed drawings on pieces of glass to be set at various distances from the camera, creating an illusion of depth. The glass could be moved to create the impression of a camera passing through the scene. The first work created on the camera‍—‌a Silly Symphony called The Old Mill (1937)‍—‌won the Academy Award for Animated Short Film because of its impressive visual power. Although Snow White had been largely finished by the time the multiplane camera had been completed, Disney ordered some scenes be re-drawn to use the new effects.

Snow White premiered in December 1937 to high praise from critics and audiences. The film became the most successful motion picture of 1938 and by May 1939 its total gross of $6.5 million made it the most successful sound film made to that date. (Note: $1.5 million in 1937 equates to $26.4 million in 2025; $6.5 million in 1939 equates to $118 million in 2025, according to calculations based on the US GDP deflator measure of inflation.) Disney won another Honorary Academy Award, which consisted of one full-sized and seven miniature Oscar statuettes. (Note: The citation for the award reads: "To Walt Disney for Snow White and the Seven Dwarfs, recognized as a significant screen innovation which has charmed millions and pioneered a great new entertainment field for the motion picture cartoon.") The success of Snow White heralded one of the most productive eras for the studio; the Walt Disney Family Museum calls the following years "the 'Golden Age of Animation'". With work on Snow White finished, the studio began producing Pinocchio in early 1938 and Fantasia in November of the same year. Both films were released in 1940, and neither performed well at the box office‍—‌partly because revenues from Europe had dropped following the start of World War II in 1939. The studio incurred a loss on both pictures and was deeply in debt by the end of February 1941.

In response to the financial crisis, Disney and his brother Roy started the company's first public stock offering in 1940, and implemented heavy salary cuts. The latter measure, and Disney's sometimes high-handed and insensitive manner of dealing with staff, led to a 1941 animators' strike which lasted five weeks. While a federal mediator from the National Labor Relations Board negotiated with the two sides, Disney accepted an offer from the Office of the Coordinator of Inter-American Affairs to make a goodwill trip to South America, ensuring he was absent during a resolution he knew would be unfavorable to the studio. (Note: The trip inspired two combined live-action and animation works Saludos Amigos (1942) and The Three Caballeros (1945).) Due to the strike‍—‌and the financial state of the company‍—‌several animators left the studio and founded United Productions of America, and Disney's relationship with other members of staff was permanently strained as a result. The strike temporarily interrupted the studio's next production, Dumbo (1941), which Disney produced in a simple and inexpensive manner; the film received a positive reaction from audiences and critics alike.

=== 1941–1950: World War II and beyond ===
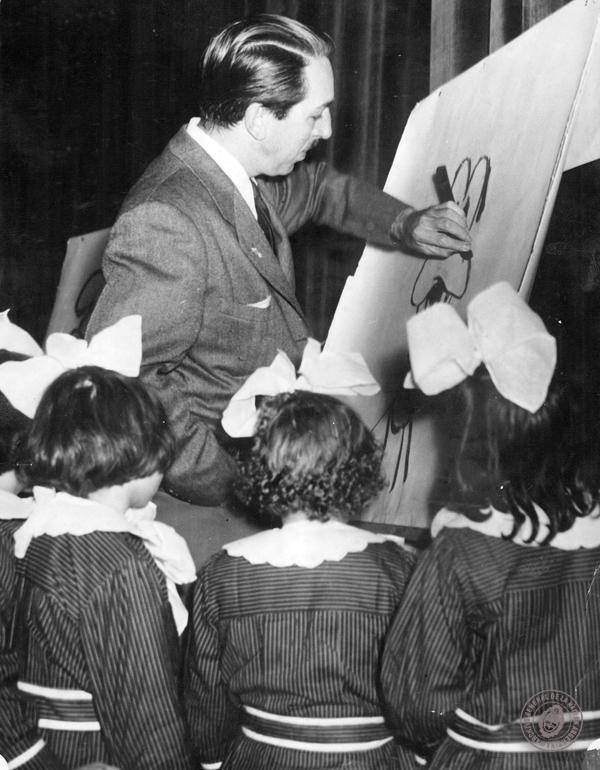
Disney drawing Goofy for a group of girls in Argentina, 1941

Shortly after the release of Dumbo in October 1941, the U.S. entered World War II. Disney formed the Walt Disney Training Films Unit within the company to produce instruction films for the military such as Four Methods of Flush Riveting and Aircraft Production Methods. Disney also met with Henry Morgenthau Jr., the secretary of the treasury, and agreed to produce short Donald Duck cartoons to promote war bonds. Disney also produced several propaganda productions, including shorts such as Der Fuehrer's Face‍—‌which won an Academy Award‍—‌and the 1943 feature film Victory Through Air Power.

The military films generated only enough revenue to cover costs, and the feature film Bambi‍—‌which had been in production since 1937‍—‌underperformed on its release in August 1942, and lost $200,000 at the box office. On top of the low earnings from Pinocchio and Fantasia, the company had debts of $4 million with the Bank of America in 1944. (Note: $4 million in 1944 equates to $73,000,000 in 2025, according to calculations based on the Consumer Price Index measure of inflation.) At a meeting with Bank of America executives to discuss the future of the company, the bank's chairman and founder, Amadeo Giannini, told his executives, "I've been watching the Disneys' pictures quite closely because I knew we were lending them money far above the financial risk. ... They're good this year, they're good next year, and they're good the year after. ... You have to relax and give them time to market their product." Disney's production of short films decreased in the late 1940s, coinciding with increasing competition in the animation market from Warner Bros. and Metro-Goldwyn-Mayer. Roy Disney, for financial reasons, suggested more combined animation and live-action productions. (Note: These included Make Mine Music (1946), Song of the South (1946), Melody Time (1948) and So Dear to My Heart (1949).) In 1948, Disney initiated a series of popular live-action nature films, titled True-Life Adventures, with Seal Island the first; the film won the Academy Award in the Best Short Subject (Two-Reel) category.

=== 1950–1966: Theme parks, television, other interests, and final years ===
In early 1950, Disney produced Cinderella, his studio's first animated feature in eight years. It was popular with critics and theater audiences. Costing $2.2 million to produce, it earned nearly $8 million in its first year. (Note: $2.2 million in 1950 equates to $29,000,000 in 2025; $8 million in 1950 equates to $107,000,000 in 2025, according to calculations based on the Consumer Price Index measure of inflation.) Disney was less involved than he had been with previous pictures because of his involvement in his first entirely live-action feature, Treasure Island (1950), which was shot in Britain, as was The Story of Robin Hood and His Merrie Men (1952). Other all-live-action features followed, many of which had patriotic themes. (Note: The patriotic films include Johnny Tremain (1957), Old Yeller (1957), Tonka (1958), Swiss Family Robinson (1960), Polyanna (1960).) He continued to produce full-length animated features too, including Alice in Wonderland (1951) and Peter Pan (1953). From the early to mid-1950s, Disney began to devote less attention to the animation department, entrusting most of its operations to his key animators, the Nine Old Men, (Note: The Nine Old Men consisted of Eric Larson, Wolfgang Reitherman, Les Clark, Milt Kahl, Ward Kimball, Marc Davis, Ollie Johnston, Frank Thomas and John Lounsbery.) although he was always present at story meetings. Instead, he started concentrating on other ventures. Around the same time, Disney established his own film distribution division Buena Vista, replacing his most recent distributor RKO Radio Pictures.

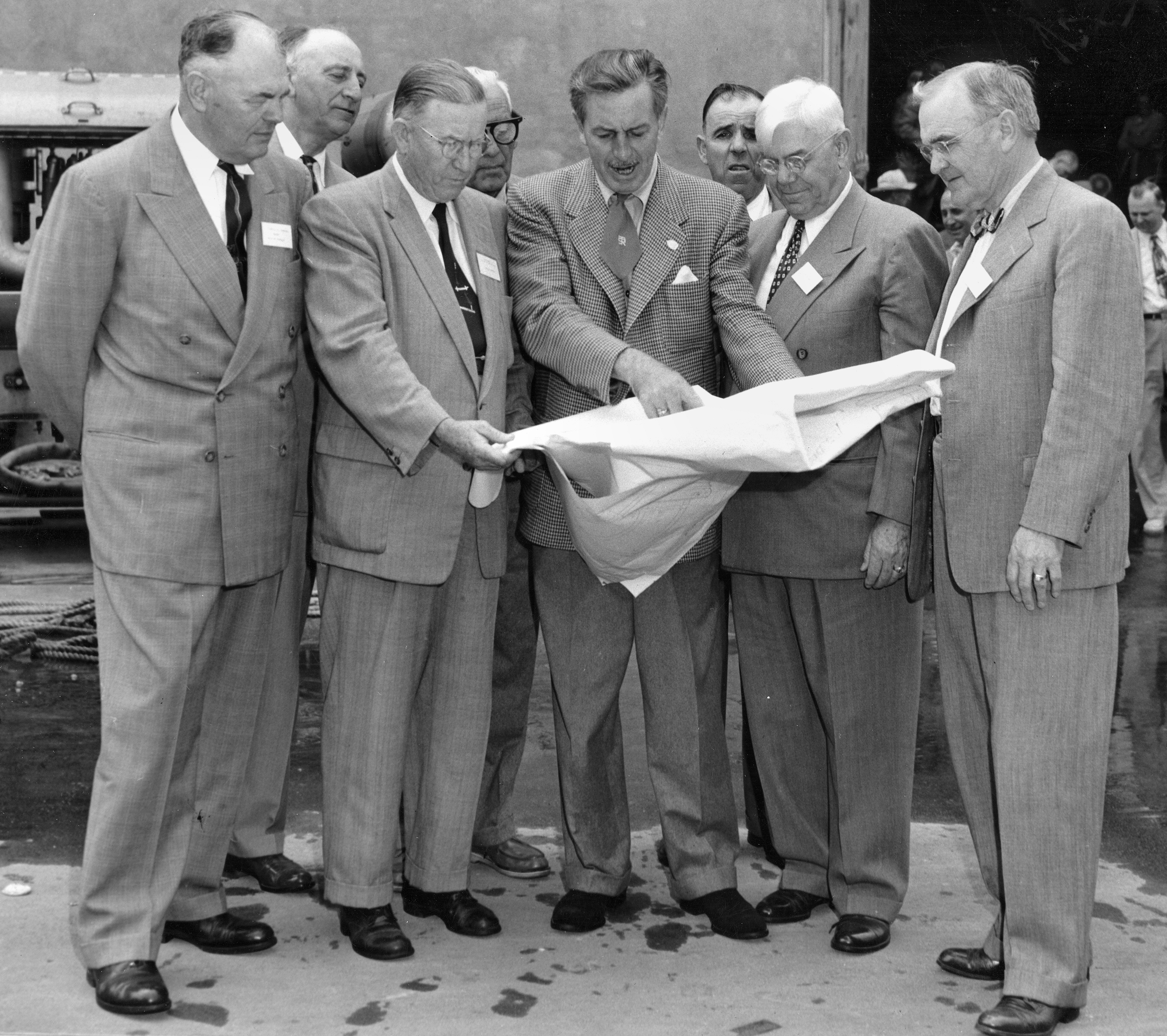
Disney shows the plans of Disneyland to officials from Orange County in December 1954

For several years Disney had been considering building a theme park. When he visited Griffith Park in Los Angeles with his daughters, he wanted to be in a clean, unspoiled park, where both children and their parents could have fun. He visited the Tivoli Gardens in Copenhagen, Denmark, and was heavily influenced by the cleanliness and layout of the park. In March 1952, he received zoning permission to build a theme park in Burbank, near the Disney studios. This site proved too small, and a larger plot in Anaheim, 35 miles (56 km) south of the studio, was purchased. To distance the project from the studio‍—‌which might attract the criticism of shareholders‍—‌Disney formed WED Enterprises (now Walt Disney Imagineering) and used his own money to fund a group of designers and animators to work on the plans; those involved became known as "Imagineers". After obtaining bank funding he invited other stockholders, American Broadcasting-Paramount Theatres‍—‌part of American Broadcasting Company (ABC)‍—‌and Western Printing and Lithographing Company. In mid-1954, Disney sent his Imagineers to every amusement park in the U.S. to analyze what worked and what pitfalls or problems there were in the various locations and incorporated their findings into his design. Construction work started in July 1954, and Disneyland opened in July 1955; the opening ceremony was broadcast on ABC, which reached 70 million viewers. The park was designed as a series of themed lands, linked by the central Main Street, U.S.A.‍—‌a replica of the main street in his hometown of Marceline. The connected themed areas were Adventureland, Frontierland, Fantasyland and Tomorrowland. The park also contained the narrow gauge Disneyland Railroad that linked the lands; around the outside of the park was a high berm to separate the park from the outside world. An editorial in The New York Times considered that Disney had "tastefully combined some of the pleasant things of yesterday with fantasy and dreams of tomorrow". Although there were early minor problems with the park, it was a success, and after a month's operation, Disneyland was receiving over 20,000 visitors a day; by the end of its first year, it attracted 3.6 million guests.

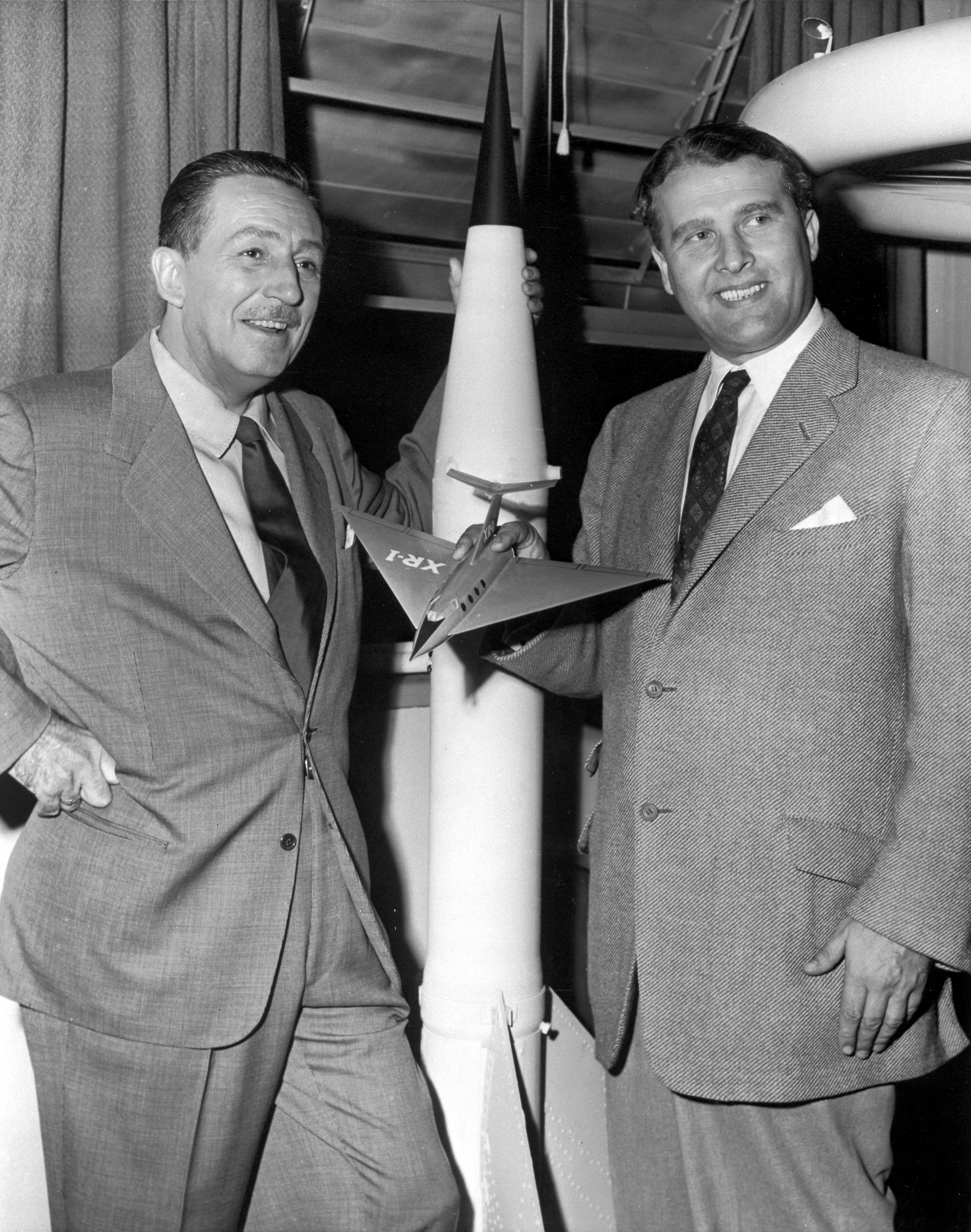
Disney in 1954 with Wernher von Braun

The money from ABC was contingent on Disney television programs. The studio had been involved in a successful television special on Christmas Day 1950 about the making of Alice in Wonderland. Roy believed the program added millions to the box office takings. In a March 1951 letter to shareholders, he wrote that "television can be a most powerful selling aid for us, as well as a source of revenue. It will probably be on this premise that we enter television when we do". In 1954, after the Disneyland funding had been agreed, ABC broadcast Walt Disney's Disneyland, an anthology consisting of animated cartoons, live-action features and other material from the studio's library. The show was successful in terms of ratings and profits, earning an audience share of over 50%. (Note: Even repeats of the program proved more popular than all other television shows—aside from Lucille Ball's I Love Lucy; no ABC program had ever been in the top 25 before Disneyland.) In April 1955, Newsweek called the series an "American institution". ABC was pleased with the ratings, leading to Disney's first daily television program, The Mickey Mouse Club, a variety show catering specifically to children. The program was accompanied by merchandising through various companies (Western Printing, for example, had been producing coloring books and comics for over 20 years, and produced several items connected to the show). One of the segments of Disneyland consisted of the five-part miniseries Davy Crockett which, according to Disney biographer Neal Gabler, "became an overnight sensation". The show's theme song, "The Ballad of Davy Crockett", became internationally popular and ten million records were sold. As a result, Disney formed his own record production and distribution entity, Disneyland Records.

As well as the construction of Disneyland, Disney worked on other projects away from the studio. He was consultant to the 1959 American National Exhibition in Moscow; Disney Studios' contribution was America the Beautiful, a 19-minute film in the 360-degree Circarama theater that was one of the most popular attractions. The following year he acted as the chairman of the Pageantry Committee for the 1960 Winter Olympics in Squaw Valley, California, where he designed the opening, closing and medal ceremonies. He was one of twelve investors in the Celebrity Sports Center, which opened in 1960 in Glendale, Colorado; he and Roy bought out the others in 1962, making the Disney company the sole owner.

Despite the demands wrought by non-studio projects, Disney continued to work on film and television projects. In 1955, he was involved in "Man in Space", an episode of the Disneyland series, which was made in collaboration with NASA rocket designer Wernher von Braun. (Note: The program, which was produced by Ward Kimball, was nominated for an Academy Award for the Best Documentary (Short Subject) at the 1957 Awards.) Disney also oversaw aspects of the full-length features Lady and the Tramp (the first animated film in CinemaScope) in 1955, Sleeping Beauty (the first animated film in Technirama 70 mm film) in 1959, One Hundred and One Dalmatians (the first animated feature film to use Xerox cels) in 1961, and The Sword in the Stone in 1963.

In 1964, Disney produced Mary Poppins, based on the book series by P. L. Travers; he had been trying to acquire the rights to the story since the 1940s. It became the most successful Disney film of the 1960s, although Travers disliked the film intensely and regretted having sold the rights. The same year he also became involved in plans to expand the California Institute of the Arts (colloquially called CalArts), and had an architect draw up blueprints for a new building.

Disney provided four exhibits for the 1964 New York World's Fair, for which he obtained funding from selected corporate sponsors. For PepsiCo, who planned a tribute to UNICEF, Disney developed It's a Small World, a boat ride with audio-animatronic dolls depicting children of the world; Great Moments with Mr. Lincoln contained an animatronic Abraham Lincoln giving excerpts from his speeches; Carousel of Progress promoted the importance of electricity; and Ford's Magic Skyway portrayed the progress of mankind. Elements of all four exhibits‍—‌principally concepts and technology‍—‌were re-installed in Disneyland, although It's a Small World is the ride that most closely resembles the original.

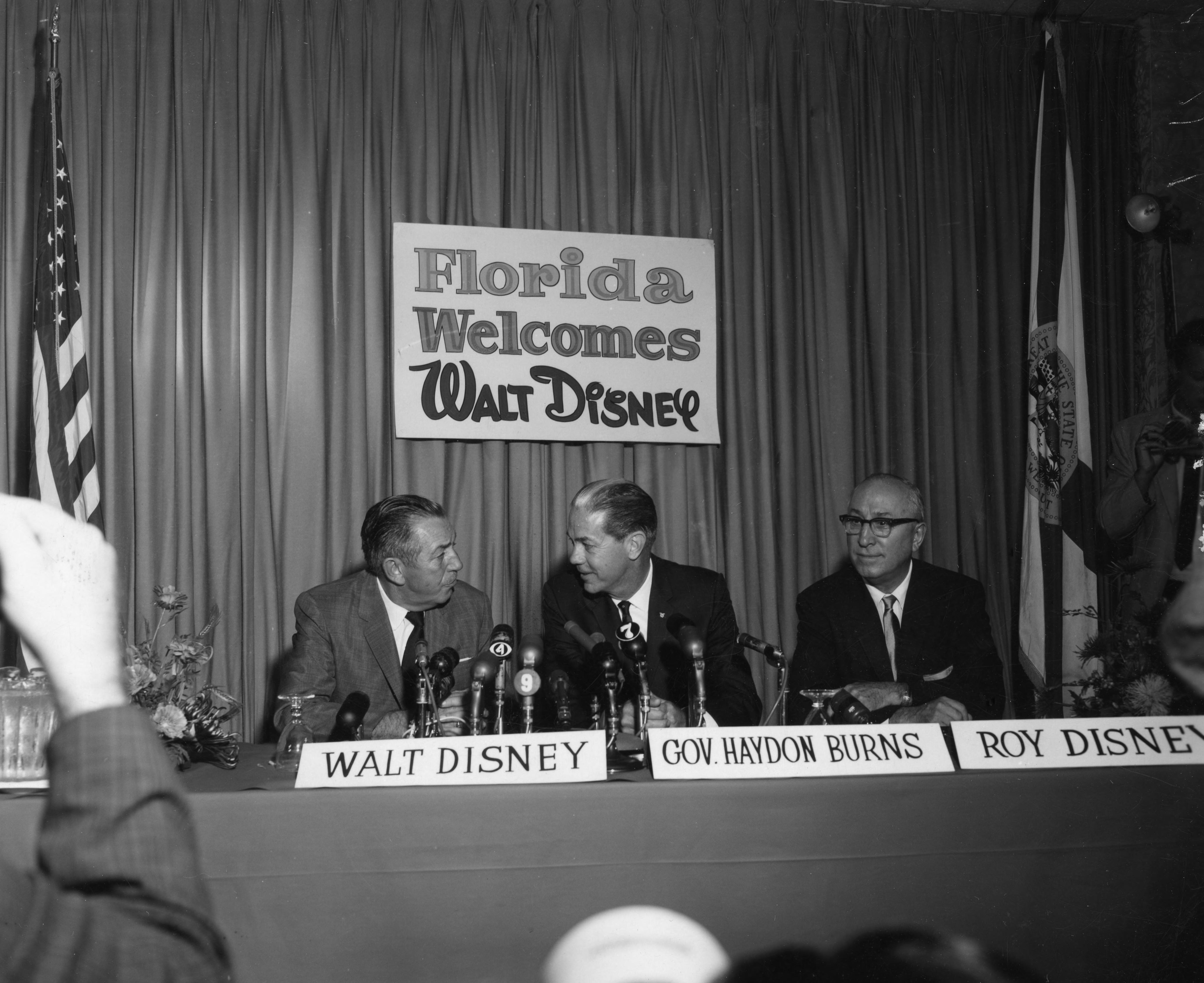
Disney (left) with his brother Roy O. Disney (right) and then Governor of Florida W. Haydon Burns (center) on November 15, 1965, publicly announcing the creation of Disney World

During the early to mid-1960s, Disney developed plans for a ski resort in Mineral King, a glacial valley in California's Sierra Nevada. He hired experts such as the Olympic ski coach and ski-area designer Willy Schaeffler. (Note: Disney's death in 1966, and opposition from conservationists, stopped the building of the resort.) With income from Disneyland accounting for an increasing proportion of the studio's income, Disney continued to look for venues for other attractions. In 1963, he presented a project to create a theme park in downtown St. Louis, Missouri; he initially reached an agreement with the Civic Center Redevelopment Corp, which controlled the land, but the deal later collapsed over funding. In late 1965, he announced plans to develop another theme park to be called "Disney World" (now Walt Disney World), a few miles southwest of Orlando, Florida. Disney World was to include the "Magic Kingdom"‍—‌a larger and more elaborate version of Disneyland‍—‌plus golf courses and resort hotels. The heart of Disney World was to be the "Experimental Prototype Community of Tomorrow" (EPCOT), which he described as:

an experimental prototype community of tomorrow that will take its cue from the new ideas and new technologies that are now emerging from the creative centers of American industry. It will be a community of tomorrow that will never be completed, but will always be introducing and testing and demonstrating new materials and systems. And EPCOT will always be a showcase to the world for the ingenuity and imagination of American free enterprise.

During 1966, Disney cultivated businesses willing to sponsor EPCOT. He received a story credit in the 1966 film Lt. Robin Crusoe, U.S.N. as Retlaw Yensid, his name spelt backwards. He increased his involvement in the studio's films, and was heavily involved in the story development of The Jungle Book, the live-action musical feature The Happiest Millionaire (both 1967) and the animated short Winnie the Pooh and the Blustery Day (1968).

== Illness, death and aftermath ==
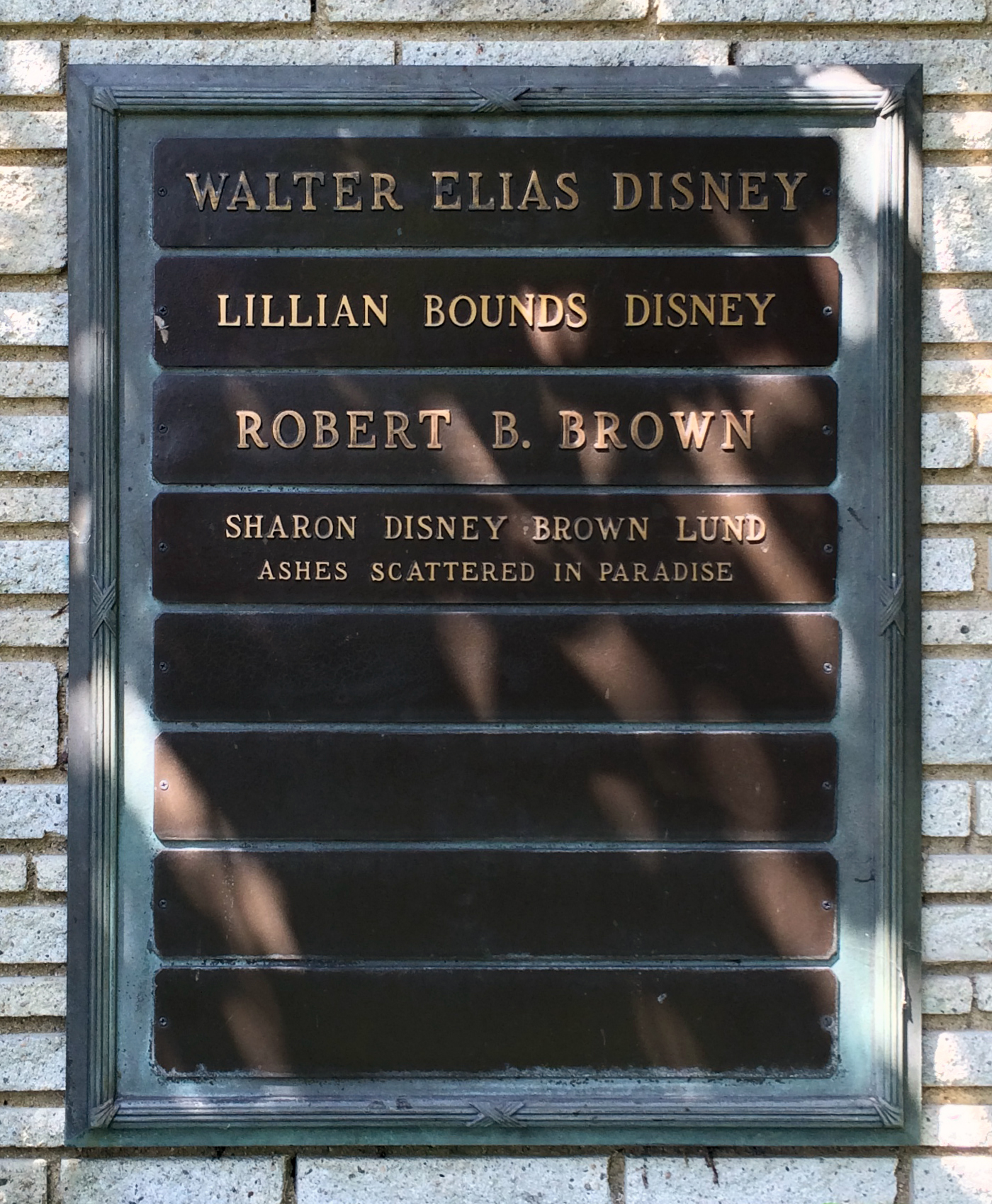
Disney's grave at the Forest Lawn Memorial Park

Disney had been a heavy smoker since World War I. He did not use cigarettes with filters and had smoked a pipe as a young man. In early November 1966, he was diagnosed with lung cancer and was treated with cobalt therapy. Believing the treatment to have been successful, he returned to work. However, on November 30 he felt unwell and was taken by ambulance from his home to St. Joseph Hospital where, on December 15, at age 65, he died of circulatory collapse caused by the cancer. His remains were cremated two days later and his ashes were interred at the Forest Lawn Memorial Park in Glendale, California. (Note: A long-standing urban legend maintains that Disney was cryonically frozen. Disney's daughter Diane later stated, "There is absolutely no truth to the rumor that my father, Walt Disney, wished to be frozen.")

The release of The Jungle Book and The Happiest Millionaire in 1967 raised the total number of feature films that Disney had been involved in to 81. When Winnie the Pooh and the Blustery Day was released in 1968, it earned Disney an Academy Award in the Short Subject (Cartoon) category, awarded posthumously. After Disney's death, his studios continued to produce live-action films prolifically while the quality of their animated films was allowed to languish. In the late 1980s, this trend was reversed in what The New York Times describes as the "Disney Renaissance" that began with The Little Mermaid (1989). Disney's studios continue to produce successful film, television and stage entertainment.

Disney's plans for the futuristic city of EPCOT did not come to fruition. After Disney's death, his brother Roy deferred his retirement to take full control of the Disney companies. He changed the focus of the project from a town to an attraction. At the inauguration in 1971, Roy dedicated Walt Disney World to his brother. (Note: Roy died two months later, in December 1971.) Walt Disney World expanded with the opening of Epcot Center in 1982; Walt Disney's vision of a functional city was replaced by a park more akin to a permanent world's fair. In 2009, the Walt Disney Family Museum, designed by Disney's daughter Diane and her son Walter E. D. Miller, opened in the Presidio of San Francisco. Thousands of artifacts from Disney's life and career are on display, including numerous awards that he received. In 2014, the Disney theme parks around the world hosted approximately 134 million visitors.

== Personal life and character ==
External videos
- Interview with Neal Gabler on Walt Disney: The Triumph of the American Imagination, November 19, 2006, C-SPAN

Early in 1925, Disney hired an ink artist, Lillian Bounds. They married in July of that year, at her brother's house in her home town of Lewiston, Idaho. The marriage was generally happy, according to Lillian, although according to Disney's biographer Neal Gabler she did not "accept Walt's decisions meekly or his status unquestionably, and she admitted that he was always telling people 'how henpecked he is'." (Note: One possible exception to the stable relationship was during the making Snow White and the Seven Dwarfs (1937), where the stresses and turmoil associated with the production led to the couple discussing divorce.) Lillian had little interest in films or the Hollywood social scene and she was, in the words of the historian Steven Watts, "content with household management and providing support for her husband". Their marriage produced two daughters, Diane (born December 1933) and Sharon (adopted in December 1936, born six weeks previously). (Note: Lillian had two miscarriages during the eight years between marriage and the birth of Diane; she suffered a further miscarriage shortly before the family adopted Sharon.) Within the family, neither Disney nor his wife hid the fact Sharon had been adopted, although they became annoyed if people outside the family raised the point. The Disneys were careful to keep their daughters out of the public eye as much as possible, particularly in the light of the Lindbergh kidnapping; Disney took steps to ensure his daughters were not photographed by the press.

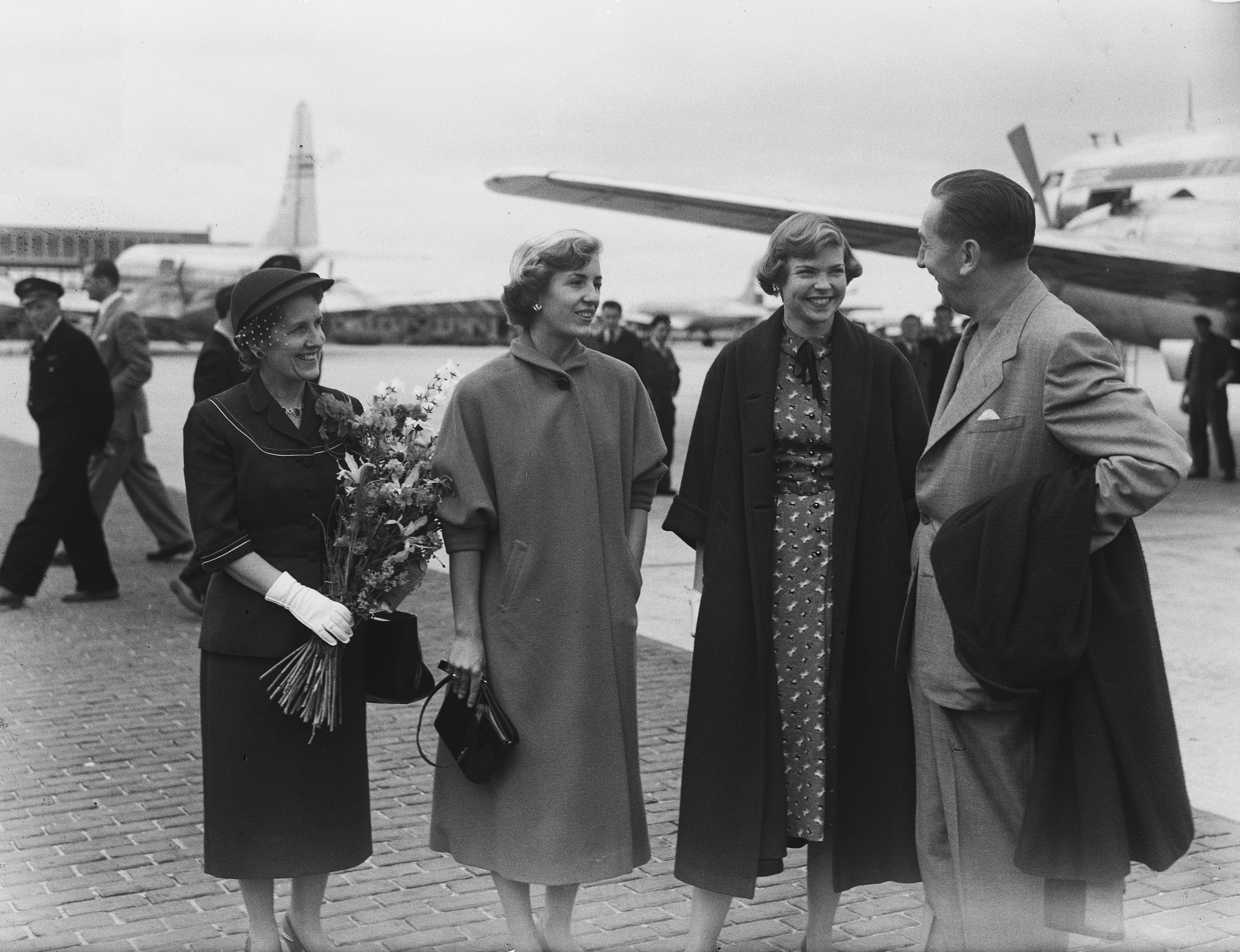
Disney with his family at Schiphol Airport, 1951

In 1949, Disney and his family moved to a new home in the Holmby Hills district of Los Angeles. With the help of his friends Ward and Betty Kimball, who already had their own backyard railroad, Disney developed blueprints and immediately set to work on creating a miniature live steam railroad for his back yard. The name of the railroad, Carolwood Pacific Railroad, came from his home's location on Carolwood Drive. The miniature working steam locomotive was built by Disney Studios engineer Roger E. Broggie, and Disney named it Lilly Belle after his wife; after three years Disney ordered it into storage due to a series of accidents involving his guests.

Disney grew more politically conservative as he got older. A Democratic Party supporter until the 1940 presidential election, when he switched allegiance to the Republican Party, he became a generous donor to Thomas E. Dewey's 1944 bid for the presidency. Disney engaged in red-baiting in response to organized labor actions against his company. In 1941, he paid for a full-page ad in Variety claiming that "Communistic agitation" was responsible for a cartoonist strike against him. In 1946, he was a founding member of the Motion Picture Alliance for the Preservation of American Ideals, an organization who stated they "believ[ed] in, and like, the American Way of Life ... we find ourselves in sharp revolt against a rising tide of Communism, Fascism and kindred beliefs, that seek by subversive means to undermine and change this way of life". In 1947, during the Second Red Scare, Disney testified before the House Un-American Activities Committee (HUAC), where he branded Herbert Sorrell, David Hilberman and William Pomerance, former animators and labor union organizers, as communist agitators; Disney stated that the 1941 strike led by them was part of an organized communist effort to gain influence in Hollywood.

The New York Times reported in 1993 that Disney had been an FBI informant passing secret information to J. Edgar Hoover about communist activities in Hollywood. However, while Walt Disney was made a "Special Agent in Charge Contact" in 1954, FBI officials claim this was largely an honorary title regularly awarded to members of a community who might be of use to the bureau. The FBI declassified and released Walt Disney's file on their website, and revealed that much of Disney's correspondence with the bureau (via studio personnel) was in relation to the production of educational films; such as a certain installment of the "Career Day" newsreel segments on The Mickey Mouse Club focusing on the bureau (which aired in January 1958), as well as an unmade 1961 educational short warning children about the dangers of child molestation.

Disney's public persona was very different from his actual personality. Playwright Robert E. Sherwood described him as "almost painfully shy ... diffident" and self-deprecating. According to his biographer Richard Schickel, Disney hid his shy and insecure personality behind his public identity. Kimball argues that Disney "played the role of a bashful tycoon who was embarrassed in public" and knew that he was doing so. Disney acknowledged the façade and told a friend that "I'm not Walt Disney. I do a lot of things Walt Disney would not do. Walt Disney does not smoke. I smoke. Walt Disney does not drink. I drink." Critic Otis Ferguson, in The New Republic, called the private Disney: "common and everyday, not inaccessible, not in a foreign language, not suppressed or sponsored or anything. Just Disney." Many of those with whom Disney worked commented that he gave his staff little encouragement due to his exceptionally high expectations. Norman recalls that when Disney said "That'll work", it was an indication of high praise. Instead of direct approval, Disney gave high-performing staff financial bonuses, or recommended certain individuals to others, expecting that his praise would be passed on.

== Reputation ==
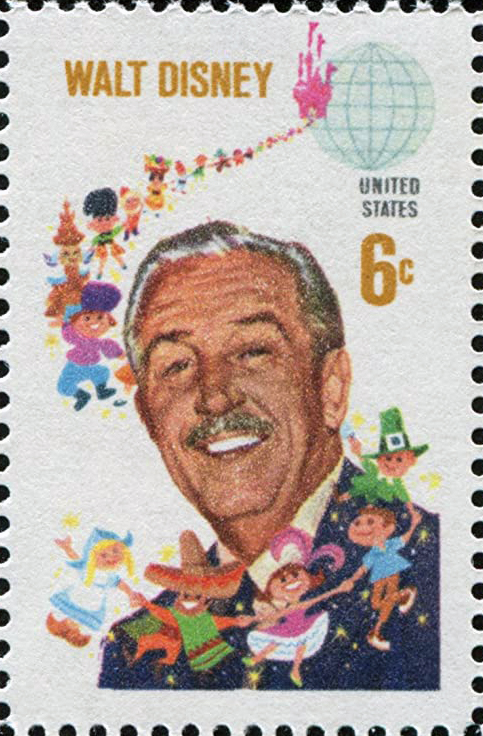
A portrait of Disney with cartoon representations of different nationalities on a 6-cent U.S. postage stamp, 1968

Views of Disney and his work have changed over the decades, and there have been polarized opinions. Mark Langer, in the American Dictionary of National Biography, writes that "Earlier evaluations of Disney hailed him as a patriot, folk artist, and popularizer of culture. More recently, Disney has been regarded as a paradigm of American imperialism and intolerance, as well as a debaser of culture." Steven Watts wrote that some denounce Disney "as a cynical manipulator of cultural and commercial formulas", while PBS records that critics have censured his work because of its "smooth façade of sentimentality and stubborn optimism, its feel-good re-write of American history".

Watts argues that many of Disney's post-World War II films "legislated a kind of cultural Marshall Plan. They nourished a genial cultural imperialism that magically overran the rest of the globe with the values, expectations, and goods of a prosperous middle-class United States." Film historian Jay P. Telotte acknowledges that many see Disney's studio as an "agent of manipulation and repression", although he observes that it has "labored throughout its history to link its name with notions of fun, family, and fantasy". John Tomlinson, in his study Cultural Imperialism, examines the work of Ariel Dorfman and Armand Mattelart, whose 1971 book Para leer al Pato Donald (transl. How to Read Donald Duck) identifies that there are "imperialist ... values 'concealed' behind the innocent, wholesome façade of the world of Walt Disney"; this, they argue, is a powerful tool as "it presents itself as harmless fun for consumption by children." Tomlinson views their argument as flawed, as "they simply assume that reading American comics, seeing adverts, watching pictures of the affluent ... ['Yankee'] lifestyle has a direct pedagogic effect".

=== Politics and allegations of prejudice ===
Disney has been accused of antisemitism for having given Nazi propagandist Leni Riefenstahl a tour of his studio a month after Kristallnacht. Riefenstahl's invitation was solicited to Disney by painter and ballet dancer Hurbert "Jay" Stowitts, a close friend of Riefenstahl, and a former colleague of Leopold Stokowski who at the time was collaborating with Disney on Fantasia. A month later a spokesperson for Disney told the New York Daily News: "Miss Riefenstahl got into the studio, but she crashed the gate. A Los Angeles man who is known to Disney obtained permission to take a party through the plant. Leni was in the party. If we had known it in advance she wouldn't have got in." Animation historian Jim Korkis theorizes that Disney may have also met with Riefenstahl for financial reasons: as an attempt by Disney to recover over 135,000 Reichsmarks owed from his German film distributor and to get the ban on Disney films lifted in Germany. Animator Art Babbitt, organizer behind the 1941 strike at the studio and who held a well-known grudge against Disney, claimed in his later years that he saw Disney and his lawyer attend meetings of the German American Bund, a pro-Nazi organization, during the late 1930s. However, according to Disney biographer Neal Gabler: "...that was highly unlikely, not only because Walt had little enough time for his family, much less political meetings, but because he had no real political leanings at the time." Disney's office appointment book makes no mention of him attending Bund rallies, and no other employee ever claimed he attended such meetings.

According to Gabler, Disney was apolitical and "something of a political naïf" during the 1930s and he had previously told one reporter – as tensions in Europe were brewing – that America should "let 'em fight their own wars" claiming he had "learned my lesson" from World War I. (Note: Disney also demonstrated his political naivete in the October 1933 issue of Overland Monthly where he stated: "Of course there must be millions of people who have a downright feeling of animosity for our M. Mouse. Mr. A. Hitler, the Nazi old thing, says that Mickey's silly. Imagine that! Well, Mickey is going to save Mr. A Hitler from drowning or something some day. Just wait and see if he doesn't. Then won't Mr. A. Hitler be ashamed!") Gabler also noted that in late 1939, Disney was going over a scale model of a new studio to be built in Burbank, when one animator suddenly asked him how the recently begun war in Europe would affect its construction, to which Disney responded by asking, "What war?" During World War II, Disney was actively involved in making propaganda films against the Nazis, both for the general public (such as Der Fuehrer's Face and Education for Death), as well as educational and training films exclusively for the United States Government. As early as October 1940 (over a year before America's entry into the war), Disney began enlisting contracts from various branches of the United States Armed Forces to make training films, and in March 1941 he held a luncheon with Government representatives formally offering his services "...for national defence industries at cost and without profit. In making this offer, I am motivated solely by a desire to help as best I can in the present emergency." These training films contained highly classified information and required the highest level of security clearance to be viewed. If Disney had any previous sympathies toward Nazism, the U.S. Government would have disqualified him from making these films.

The Walt Disney Family Museum acknowledges that ethnic stereotypes common to films of the 1930s were included in some early cartoons (Note: Examples include The Three Little Pigs (in which the Big Bad Wolf comes to the door dressed as a Jewish peddler) and The Opry House (in which Mickey Mouse is dressed and dances as a Hasidic Jew).) but also points out that Disney donated regularly to Jewish charities and was named the 1955 "Man of the Year" by the B'nai B'rith chapter in Beverly Hills. The organization itself found no evidence of antisemitism on Disney's part. The plaque read: "For exemplifying the best tenets of American citizenship and inter-group understanding and interpreting into action the ideals of B'nai B'rith." Disney had numerous Jewish employees, many of whom were in influential positions. None of Disney's employees – including animator Art Babbitt, who disliked Disney intensely – ever accused him of making antisemitic slurs or taunts. Jewish story man Joe Grant, who worked closely with Disney throughout the 1930s and 1940s stated, "As far as I'm concerned, there was no evidence of antisemitism. I think the whole idea should be put to rest and buried deep. He was not antisemitic. Some of the most influential people at the studio were Jewish. It's much ado about nothing. I never once had a problem with him in that way." (Note: Other Jewish employees production manager Harry Tytle, and head of merchandising Kay Kamen, who once quipped that Disney's New York office had "more Jews than The Book of Leviticus") In addition songwriter Robert B. Sherman recalled that when one of Disney's lawyers made antisemitic remarks towards him and his brother Richard, Disney defended them and fired the attorney. Gabler, the first writer to gain unrestricted access to the Disney archives, concludes that the available evidence does not support accusations of antisemitism and that Disney largely got that reputation due to his association with Motion Picture Alliance for the Preservation of American Ideals – an anti-Communist organization formed in 1944, that was rumored to have antisemitic undertones. Gabler concludes that "...though Walt himself, in my estimation, was not antisemitic, nevertheless, he willingly allied himself with people who were antisemitic, and that reputation stuck. He was never really able to expunge it throughout his life." Disney distanced himself from the Motion Picture Alliance, and had no involvement with the organization after 1947. According to Disney's daughter Diane Disney-Miller, her sister Sharon dated a Jewish boyfriend for a period of time, to which her father raised no objections and reportedly said, "Sharon, I think it's wonderful how these Jewish families have accepted you."

Disney has also been accused of other forms of racism because some of his productions released between the 1930s and 1950s contain racially insensitive material. (Note: Examples include Mickey's Mellerdrammer, in which Mickey Mouse dresses in blackface; the black-colored bird in the short Who Killed Cock Robin; the American Indians in Peter Pan; and the crows in Dumbo (although the case has been made that the crows were sympathetic to Dumbo because they knew what it was like to be ostracized).) Gabler argues that "Walt Disney was no racist. He never, either publicly or privately, made disparaging remarks about blacks or asserted white superiority. Like most white Americans of his generation, however, he was racially insensitive." The feature film Song of the South was criticized by contemporary film critics, the NAACP, and others for its perpetuation of black stereotypes, but during filming Disney became close friends with its star, James Baskett, describing him in a letter to his sister Ruth as "the best actor, I believe, to be discovered in years." Disney and Baskett stayed in contact long after the film's production, with Walt sending him gifts. When Baskett was in failing health, Disney not only began financially supporting him and his family, but also campaigned successfully for an Honorary Academy Award for his performance, making Baskett the first black actor so honored. Baskett died shortly afterward, and his widow wrote Disney a letter of gratitude for his support claiming he had been a "friend in deed and [we] certainly have been in need." Floyd Norman, the studio's first black animator who worked closely with Disney during the 1950s and 1960s, said, "Not once did I observe a hint of the racist behavior Walt Disney was often accused of after his death. His treatment of people‍—‌and by this I mean all people‍—‌can only be called exemplary."

=== Portrayals and cultural depictions ===
Disney has been portrayed numerous times in fictional works. H. G. Wells references Disney in his 1938 novel The Holy Terror, in which World Dictator Rud fears that Donald Duck is meant to lampoon the dictator. Disney was portrayed by Len Cariou in the 1995 made-for-TV film A Dream Is a Wish Your Heart Makes: The Annette Funicello Story, and by Tom Hanks in the 2013 film Saving Mr. Banks. In 2001, American German-language author Peter Stephan Jungk published Der König von Amerika (trans: The King of America), a fictional work of Disney's later years that re-imagines him as a power-hungry racist. The composer Philip Glass later adapted the book into the opera The Perfect American (2013).

Several commentators have described Disney as a cultural icon. On Disney's death, journalism professor Ralph S. Izard comments that the values in Disney's films are those "considered valuable in American Christian society", which include "individualism, decency, ... love for our fellow man, fair play and toleration". Disney's obituary in The Times calls the films "wholesome, warm-hearted and entertaining ... of incomparable artistry and of touching beauty". Journalist Bosley Crowther argues that Disney's "achievement as a creator of entertainment for an almost unlimited public and as a highly ingenious merchandiser of his wares can rightly be compared to the most successful industrialists in history." Correspondent Alistair Cooke calls Disney a "folk-hero ... the Pied Piper of Hollywood", while Gabler considers Disney "reshaped the culture and the American consciousness". In the American Dictionary of National Biography, Langer writes:

Disney remains the central figure in the history of animation. Through technological innovations and alliances with governments and corporations, he transformed a minor studio in a marginal form of communication into a multinational leisure industry giant. Despite his critics, his vision of a modern, corporate utopia as an extension of traditional American values has possibly gained greater currency in the years after his death.

In December 2021, the Metropolitan Museum of Art in New York opened a three-month special exhibit in honor of Disney titled "Inspiring Walt Disney".

== Awards and honors ==
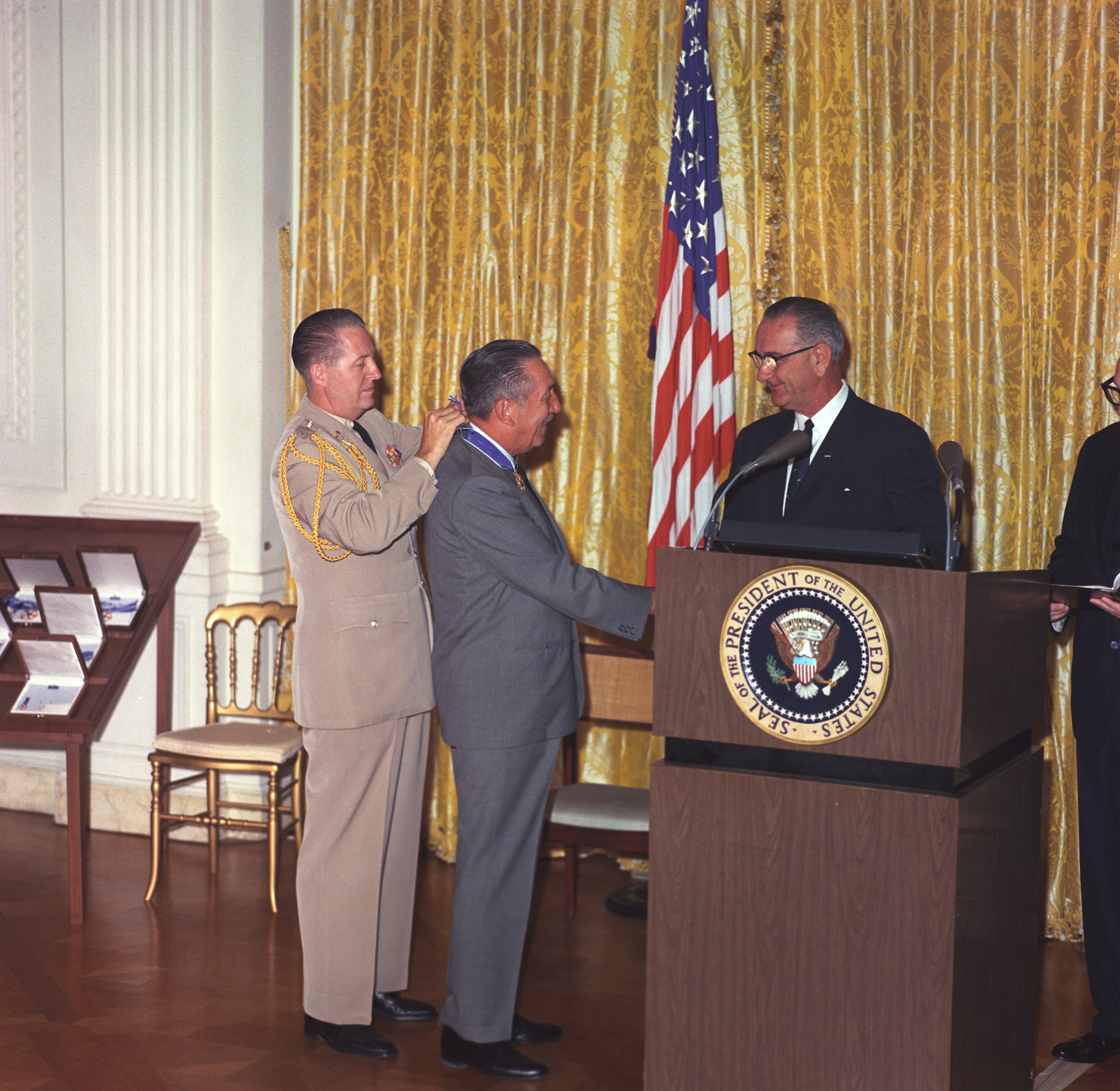
Disney receiving the Presidential Medal of Freedom in 1964 from President Lyndon B. Johnson.

Disney received 59 Academy Award nominations, including 22 awards: both totals are records. He was nominated for three Golden Globe Awards, but did not win, but he was presented with two Special Achievement Awards‍—‌for Bambi (1942) and The Living Desert (1953)‍—‌and the Cecil B. DeMille Award. He also received four Emmy Award nominations, winning once, for Best Producer for the Disneyland television series. Several of his films are included in the United States National Film Registry by the Library of Congress as "culturally, historically, or aesthetically significant": Steamboat Willie, The Three Little Pigs, Snow White and the Seven Dwarfs, Fantasia, Pinocchio, Bambi, Dumbo and Mary Poppins. In 1998, the American Film Institute published a list of the 100 greatest American films, according to industry experts; the list included Snow White and the Seven Dwarfs (at number 49), and Fantasia (at 58).

In February 1960, Disney was inducted to the Hollywood Walk of Fame with two stars, one for motion pictures and the other for his television work; Mickey Mouse was given his own star for motion pictures in 1978, and Disneyland received one in 2005. Disney was also inducted into the Television Hall of Fame in 1986, the California Hall of Fame in December 2006, was the inaugural recipient of a star on the Anaheim walk of stars in 2014, and was a member of the first Orange County Hall of Fame class in 2023.

The Walt Disney Family Museum records that he "along with members of his staff, received more than 950 honors and citations from throughout the world". He was made a Chevalier in the French Légion d'honneur in 1935, and in 1952 he was awarded the country's highest artistic decoration, the Officer d'Academie. Other national awards include Thailand's Order of the Crown (1960); Germany's Order of Merit (1956), Brazil's Order of the Southern Cross (1941), and Mexico's Order of the Aztec Eagle (1943). In the United States, he received the Presidential Medal of Freedom on September 14, 1964, and on May 24, 1968, he was posthumously awarded the Congressional Gold Medal. He received the Showman of the World Award from the National Association of Theatre Owners, and in 1955, the National Audubon Society awarded Disney its highest honor, the Audubon Medal, for promoting the "appreciation and understanding of nature" through his True-Life Adventures nature films. A minor planet discovered in 1980 by astronomer Lyudmila Karachkina, was named 4017 Disneya, and he was also awarded honorary degrees from Harvard, Yale, the University of Southern California and the University of California, Los Angeles.

== See also ==
- Masaichi Nagata - the president of Japanese film company Daiei Film whose connection with Disney had influenced distributions of Disney productions and the publication of Bambi, a Life in the Woods in Japan, construction of Nara Dreamland, and so on.

== Notes ==
Preceded by none	Voice of Mickey Mouse; 1928–1947; 1955–1959	Succeeded by James MacDonald

Business positions
Preceded by none	President of The Walt Disney Company; 1923–1945	Succeeded by Roy O. Disney
Preceded by none	Chairman of The Walt Disney Company; 1923–1959	Succeeded by position vacant
