= 1888 Lake Forest Foresters football team =

American college football season

1888 Lake Forest Foresters football
- Conference: Independent
- Record: 2–2
- Head coach: None

1888 Midwestern college football independents records
	Conf.			Overall
Team	W	L	T	W		L		T
Cincinnati		–		1	–	0	–	1
Notre Dame		–		1	–	0	–	0
Washington University		–		1	–	0	–	0
Michigan		–		2	–	1	–	0
Northwestern		–		2	–	1	–	0
Lake Forest		–		2	–	2	–	0
Minnesota		–		1	–	1	–	0
Indiana		–		0	–	0	–	1
Miami (OH)		–		0	–	0	–	1
Albion		–		0	–	2	–	0

The 1888 Lake Forest Foresters football team represented Lake Forest College as an independent during the 1888 college football season.

== Schedule ==
Date	Time	Opponent	Site	Result	Source
November 17	2:30 p.m.	at Chicago Harvard Prep School	Wanderer's cricket grounds; Chicago, IL	L 4–22	
November 24		Northwestern	Lake Forest, IL	W 18–4	
November 29		at Racine	Racine, WI	W 32–0	
December 1		at Northwestern	Evanston, IL	L 6–12	
