= James Yacullo =

American lawyer and politician

James J. Yacullo (March 14, 1904 – March 31, 1990) was an American lawyer and politician.

Yacullo was born in New York City, New York. He moved to Chicago, Illinois with his family in 1911. He graduated from McKinley High School in 1922, then attended Crane Junior College and earned his law degree from DePaul University College of Law.

He was admitted to the Illinois Bar in 1927 and practiced law in Chicago. Yacullo also served as an Assistant Attorney General for the state of Illinois. A member of the Republican Party, he was elected to the Illinois House of Representatives and served from 1953 to 1954.

Yacullo died on March 31, 1990, at a nursing home in Bloomingdale, Illinois.
