= 1888 Notre Dame football team =

American college football season

1888 Notre Dame football
- Conference: Independent
- Record: 1–0
- Head coach: None
- Captain: Edward Prudhomme

1888 Midwestern college football independents records
	Conf.			Overall
Team	W	L	T	W		L		T
Cincinnati		–		1	–	0	–	1
Notre Dame		–		1	–	0	–	0
Washington University		–		1	–	0	–	0
Michigan		–		2	–	1	–	0
Northwestern		–		2	–	1	–	0
Lake Forest		–		2	–	2	–	0
Minnesota		–		1	–	1	–	0
Indiana		–		0	–	0	–	1
Miami (OH)		–		0	–	0	–	1
Albion		–		0	–	2	–	0

The 1888 Notre Dame football team was an American football team that represented the University of Notre Dame in the 1888 college football season. The team had no coach and played only one game during the fall of 1888, a 20–0 victory over Harvard Prep School (a preparatory school in Chicago, also known as Chicago Harvard School) at South Bend, Indiana, on December 6, 1888. The win over Harvard Prep was the first victory in the history of the Notre Dame Fighting Irish football program. It was also the programs first blowout win, first undefeated season, and most points scored against an opposing football team. The 20–0 win was twice the number of points scored during the entire 1887 season. Although they only played a single game, Harvard Prep had declared themselves champions of Illinois after going undefeated prior to the contest with Notre Dame, and when Notre Dame defeated them, the South Bend Tribune asserted that University was "Champions of the Northwest".

== Schedule ==
Date	Opponent	Site	Result	Source
December 1	Albion	Notre Dame, IN	Cancelled	
December 6	Harvard Prep School	Notre Dame, IN	W 20–0	
