= 1888 Minnesota Golden Gophers football team =

American college football season

1888 Minnesota Golden Gophers football
- Conference: Independent
- Record: 1–1
- Head coach: Frederick S. Jones (3rd season)
- Captain: B. E. Trask

1888 Midwestern college football independents records
	Conf.			Overall
Team	W	L	T	W		L		T
Cincinnati		–		1	–	0	–	1
Notre Dame		–		1	–	0	–	0
Washington University		–		1	–	0	–	0
Michigan		–		2	–	1	–	0
Northwestern		–		2	–	1	–	0
Lake Forest		–		2	–	2	–	0
Minnesota		–		1	–	1	–	0
Indiana		–		0	–	0	–	1
Miami (OH)		–		0	–	0	–	1
Albion		–		0	–	2	–	0

The 1888 Minnesota Golden Gophers football team represented the University of Minnesota as an independent during the 1888 college football season. This was the third and final season under head coach Frederick S. Jones. Following the 14–0 Minnesota win over Shattuck, the Ariel reported that "The game was followed by a bus-ride about the city, and the University and Shattuck yells combined to make the day hideous till supper time."

Team of 1888: Rush Line, S.S. Start, J. Paul Goode, M.E. Trench, William H. Hoyt, M. H. Gerry, William C. Leary, Birney E. Trask (captain); Quarterback, Alf F. Pillsbury; Halfbacks, John F. Hayden, George K. Belden; Fullback, Grant B. Rossman.

== Schedule ==
Date	Opponent	Site	Result
October 28	at Shattuck	Faribault, MN	L 8–16
October 31	Shattuck	Minneapolis, MN	W 14–0
