= 1888 Michigan Wolverines football team =

American college football season

1888 Michigan Wolverines football
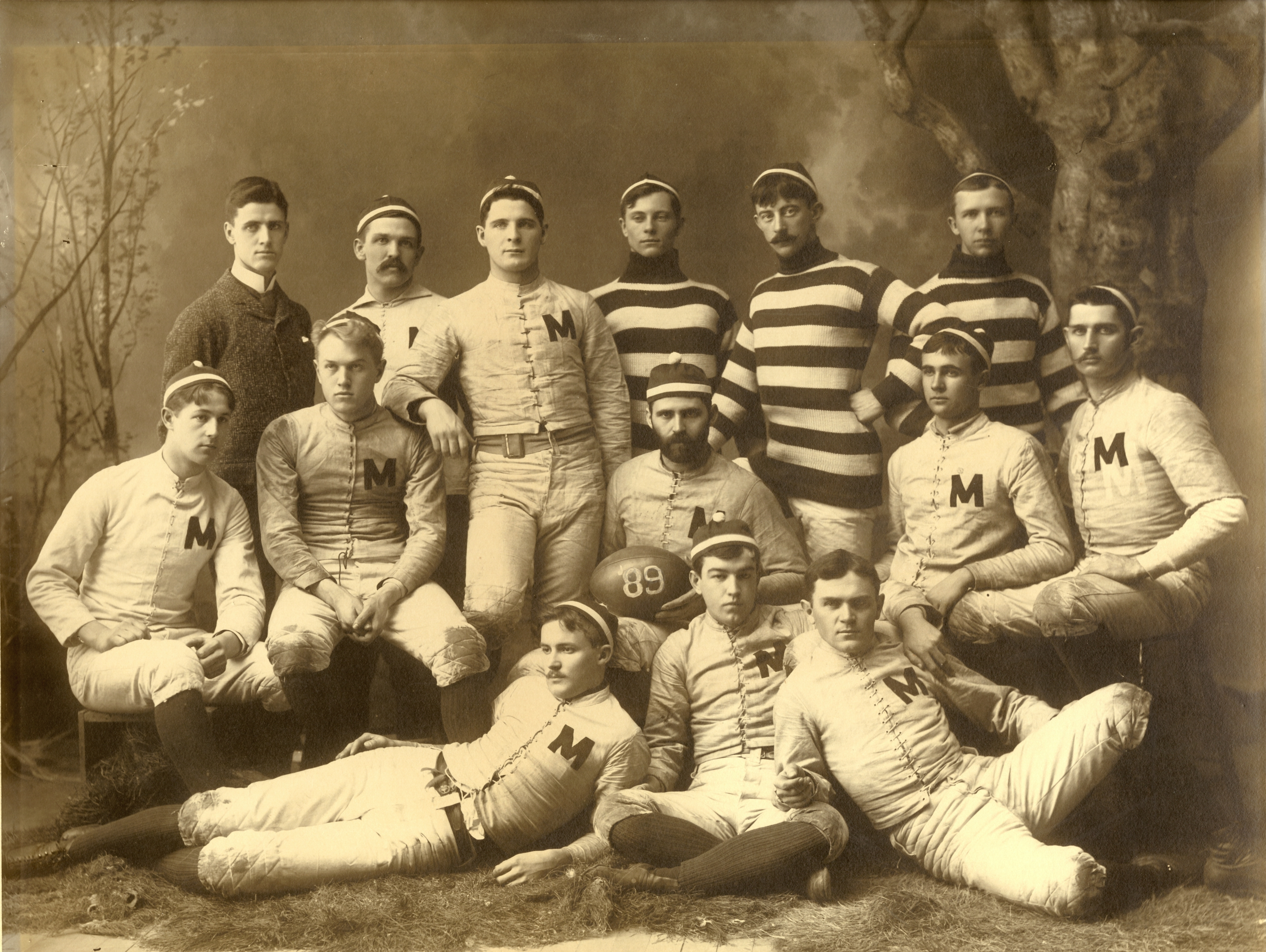
- Conference: Independent
- Record: 2–1
- Head coach: None
- Captain: James E. Duffy
- Home stadium: Ann Arbor Fairgrounds

1888 Midwestern college football independents records
	Conf.			Overall
Team	W	L	T	W		L		T
Cincinnati		–		1	–	0	–	1
Notre Dame		–		1	–	0	–	0
Washington University		–		1	–	0	–	0
Michigan		–		2	–	1	–	0
Northwestern		–		2	–	1	–	0
Lake Forest		–		2	–	2	–	0
Minnesota		–		1	–	1	–	0
Indiana		–		0	–	0	–	1
Miami (OH)		–		0	–	0	–	1
Albion		–		0	–	2	–	0

The 1888 Michigan Wolverines football team represented the University of Michigan in the 1888 college football season. The team compiled a 2–1 record and outscored its opponents by a combined score of 94 to 36. The team scored 76 points against Albion College, a single-game Michigan record that stood until Fielding H. Yost's 1901 "Point-a-Minute" team scored 128 points against Buffalo. The team closed its season with a Thanksgiving Day game against a "picked team" from the Chicago University Club that The New York Times called "undoubtedly the greatest football event that ever took place in the West." The captain of the 1888 team was halfback James E. Duffy who had set the world's record for dropkick distance in 1886.

== Schedule ==
Date	Time	Opponent	Site	Result	Attendance	Source
November 17	3:30 p.m.	at Detroit Athletic Club	Detroit Athletic Club grounds; Detroit, MI	W 14–6		
November 24		Albion	Ann Arbor Fairgrounds; Ann Arbor, MI	W 76–4		
November 29	2:15 p.m.	at Chicago University club	Chicago Baseball Park; Chicago, IL	L 4–26	3,000	

== Season summary ==
=== Pre-season ===
In its first issue of the 1888–1889 academic year, The Chronicle (a weekly newspaper at the University of Michigan) expressed concern over the prospects for the school's football team. The newspaper noted that the team had lost some of its most valuable men and urged "everyone who has played foot-ball or who thinks that with practice he could play," to try out for the team. In another article, the same newspaper opined that the 1888 team was "crippled by the general breakup of last year." The Chronicle repeatedly complained that the professional departments, especially the law and medicine departments, had failed to demonstrate their college spirit by participating on the team. Students who were unable to play were urged to assist the team in its practice sessions or to donate money to a fund to be used in purchasing uniforms and equipment for the team. For those willing to assist the team in practice, The Chronicle wrote: "Don't be afraid of a rough tumble or a laugh for an awkward play."

On September 29, 1888, the seniors defeated the juniors in the annual "football rush." The seniors won the competition "in two straight innings." On October 17, 1888, Theodore Roosevelt, then a "scholar and writer of New York," visited the Michigan campus and delivered a speech. The Chronicle reported on Roosevelt's comments directed at the football team: "Theo. Roosevelt has no fear of the murderous Sioux or of a cattle stampede, but he does claim that it is not healthy to get in the way of the U. of M. rugby team." In late October, the team began practicing every evening at 4 p.m. All students who were "strong enough for the game" were again reminded to come out and practice with the team.

The team's schedule was established based on challenges between teams. The 1888 Michigan team received challenges from Notre Dame, the Harvard School of Chicago, the Detroit Athletic Club, and Albion College. In the end, only three games were scheduled, the first on November 17 and the last on November 29. The last game was set for Thanksgiving Day in hopes that the game would attract a large crowd and develop a tradition to rival the Thanksgiving Day games played before large crowds in New York.

=== At Detroit Athletic Club ===
Michigan played its first game of the year on November 17, 1888, in Detroit. The opponent was the football team from the Detroit Athletic Club, and the game was played at the Club's grounds. As one of the earliest exhibitions of football in Detroit, the game attracted considerable interest and curiosity. The Detroit Free Press emphasized the unfamiliarity of the game in its coverage:

"The spectacle of twenty muscular young men in one colossal heap, struggling, pulling, hauling, pushing, with arms, legs and caps flying in every direction is an exciting and certainly novel one. . . . All the ground and lofty tumbling was for the possession of a leather-covered foot ball, which every one of those twenty-two athletes had evidently determined to possess or perish in the attempt. . . . While one unaccustomed to foot ball will naturally be startled by some of the acrobatic feats, still it is impossible to watch the game for any length of time without a tingling of the blood and holding of the breath. It is most intensely exciting, continuous in action and replete with fine points of play."

The teams took to the field at 3 p.m., and the game began at 3:30 p.m. The Free Press described the athletic grounds as "a gay scene" with young men "scampering over the field" in picturesque suits consisting of "close-fitting knitted caps of gay colors, canvas jackets and knickerbockers, stockings of various colors and shoes of all kind."

On the opening play of the game, Michigan's team captain James E. Duffy (who had set the world's record for dropkick distance in 1886) lined up for the kick off, but Michigan halfback Edgar McPherran grabbed the ball on a pre-arranged trick play and ran downfield. Duffy followed with a long run from scrimmage. Michigan scored eight points in the first half of 45 minutes. The points came on a touchdown and goal after touchdown (both scored by Duffy) and a safety. In the second half, Michigan end James Van Inwagen added a touchdown for Michigan. The game ended early due to darkness. Although Michigan records reflect the final score as a 14–6 victory, the account of the game in the Detroit Free Press indicated that the score was 14–0 when the game was "postponed" due to darkness.

The team sent to Detroit consisted of Van Inwagen (right end), Bradley (right tackle), Hagle (right guard), Malley (center), Beach (left guard), Northcroft (left tackle), Smith (left end), Farrand (quarterback), McPherran (halfback), Duffy (halfback), and Ball (goal). DePont and Payne were the substitutes. The umpire was Frederick William Mehlhop, and the referee was Michigan student George P. Codd.

=== Albion ===
Michigan played its only home game against Albion College at the Ann Arbor Fairgrounds on November 24, 1888. Michigan won by a score of 76–4. Michigan's 76 points established a Wolverines' single-game scoring record that was not exceeded until Fielding H. Yost's 1901 "Point-a-Minute" team scored 128 points against Buffalo. Albion's four points were awarded after the visitors disputed a call made by the officials and threatened to leave the grounds. The Albion players were persuaded to continue with the game "upon a concession of four points by the home team." The Detroit Free Press called it "a splendid game" with "some excellent team work being done by the 'Varsity eleven." The Chronicle wrote: "As usual U. of M. had a walk away. Albion scored her first point through an error."

Michigan's lineup against Albion was Van Inwagen (right end), Bradley (right tackle), Malley (right guard), Hagle (center), Beach (left guard), Payne (left tackle), MacMillan (left end), F. L. Smith (quarterback), McPherran (halfback), J. E. Duffy (halfback), and Ball (goal).

=== At Chicago University club ===
Michigan concluded its season with a Thanksgiving Day game against the Chicago University club. The game was played at the Chicago Baseball Park, the home field of Cap Anson's 1888 Chicago Whitestockings. It was attended by 3,000 persons, and the proceeds totaling approximately $1,200 were given to charities, including the Geneva Fresh Air Fund, the Lake Side Sanitarium, and the Training School for Nurses. A 15-inch high silver cup valued at $300 was presented to the winning team. The New York Times and Outing magazine both called it "undoubtedly the greatest football event that ever took place in the West."

Football was new to Chicago, and the Chicago Daily Tribune therefore published a lengthy summary of the game's rules, jargon, and methods on the day before the game. The Tribune described prize-fighting as "a mild sport" in comparison to football:

"In a football game a player who gets possession of the ball may be attacked by anywhere form one to eleven men. . . . Slugging is not allowed, but 'tackling' is. A tackle, as described below, is a delightful and exciting point of play. . . . The man who is tackled, if game, will endeavor to hold the ball while the members of both teams will try to form a mountain on top of him."

The Michigan team arrived in Chicago at 7 p.m. on Friday evening and stayed at the Palmer House. After eating supper at the hotel, the team attended a performance of Francis Chassaigne's "Nadjy" at the Chicago Opera House. The Chicago University Club team was a "picked team" selected from the best athletes in the West, many of whom had played college football for Yale, Princeton, Harvard, or Columbia. Chicago's center (Peters) and left guard (Burke) were well-known former college players who were brought in from St. Paul and Nebraska. The New York Times wrote that "the preparatory schools and the universities had been drained for the best talent in sight." The Chicago Daily Tribune wrote that the Chicago team "represented the best men that could be collected from university men resident west of the Alleghenies."

The game attracted many representatives of Chicago's high society. The Chicago Daily Tribune wrote: "The finest turnouts of the city with the leaders of Chicago beauty decked in ... and favorite college colors swept into the grounds. Four-in-hands, tally-hos, . . . English carts, mail phaetons, carriages and all sorts of fashionable vehicles . . . Their occupants did not know much about football and did not entirely approve of the rough and gory sport." A bugle on a tally-ho belonging to Chicago quarterback Harry Hamlin announced the arrival of the Chicago team at the playing field.

Early in the contest, Michigan's starting center Horace Greely Prettyman was ejected for "slugging" Chicago's center, Peters. The New York Times wrote: "Prettyman lost his temper and struck Peters in the mouth twice with his fist." The Chronicle offered a defense of Prettyman: "The facts in the case are that Prettyman knocked loose the hands of Peters when Peters had grabbed him by the jacket. Peters declared that Prettyman had not hit him on the jaw, but the umpire, a Yale man, knew more than the man who was struck!"

The New York Times called Prettyman "the backbone of the Michigan rush line" and noted that the team was disheartened after his ejection. Peters, the player who Prettyman hit, was described as "the giant of the Chicago men." The Detroit Free Press described the difficulties that the Michigan team had in handling Peters after Prettyman was ejected: "Two or three men went for him and were hurled from his shoulders like boys tossed by a long-horned Texas steer, and clearing the mob he knocked down the last remaining opponent and scored a touch-down." The Chicago team took an 18-0 lead at halftime. According to the Chicago Daily Tribune, the halftime intermission allowed the players to "count bruises." The Tribune emphasized the physical nature of the battle: "Not a man on either team had escaped blood. Noses were bleeding profusely, every man's lips were cut and swollen faces were plastered with mud, and lame joints and twitching backs were many."

In the second half, Michigan halfback and captain James E. Duffy scored Michigan's only touchdown "by good running and dodging." Duffy was singled out for praise. The New York Times wrote that Duffy played with "wonderful skill" and noted that many observers thought that Duffy's play was "the chief feature of the game."

Duffy scored a second touchdown on a long run, but the umpire, Samuel Davis Capen, ruled that Duffy had been offside and disallowed the touchdown. The ruling was disputed, and even the Chicago Daily Tribune wrote that the score should have been allowed. After the game, one Michigan player complained about the officiating: "Those Yale men [Capen was a Yale graduate] are always ferocious, but we don't object to rough treatment. What we didn't like was that our men were ruled off for slugging, while they could slug as much as they pleased." Michigan's captain, Duffy, added: "The only thing that I regret is that we feel that the umpire was unfair. Disqualifying Prettyman disheartened us. He was our mainstay. We have learned that football consists much more in little tricks incessantly played than in plain, fair play." The Chronicle emphasized that the Chicago team treated the Michigan team "most royally and acted as perfect gentlemen," but complained, "'Tis lamentable that as much can not be said of the fairness of the umpire." The Chronicle also opined that, despite the loss, the Michigan team "was well trained, and probably as thoroughly disciplined as any the University has had for some years."

Michigan's starting lineup on Thanksgiving Day was Van Inwagen (right end), Bradley (right tackle), Malley (right guard), Prettyman (center), Beach (left guard), Hagle (left tackle), MacMillan (left end), F. L. Smith (quarterback), McPherran (halfback), J. E. Duffy (halfback), and W. D. Ball (goal).

The game drew more extensive coverage in the press than any previous football game in the West. The Chronicle expressed the hope that the game would spark interest in football in the West and opined that "the fever may now be said to be upon us." The Chicago Times covered the Thanksgiving Day game on the front page and relegated the Yale–Princeton game to page two.

== Players ==
=== Varsity letter winners ===
- William D. Ball, Ann Arbor, Michigan – fullback
- Raymond Walter Beach, Atwood, Michigan – left guard
- S. L. Bradley – right tackle
- James E. Duffy, Ann Arbor, Michigan – left halfback
- Anson Hagle, Evanston, Illinois – left tackle
- Lincoln MacMillan, Ann Arbor, Michigan – left end
- William C. Malley, Chicago, Illinois – right guard
- Edgar W. McPherran, Marquette, Michigan - right halfback
- Horace Prettyman, Bryan, Ohio – center
- Frederic L. Smith, Detroit, Michigan – quarterback
- James Van Inwagen, Chicago, Illinois – right end

=== Others ===
- Edwin Truman Coman, Kankakee, Illinois – substitute
- Edward P. DePont, Ann Arbor, Michigan –substitute
- Royal T. Farrand, Detroit, Michigan – quarterback
- George Northcroft, London, England – left tackle
- William Mason Payne, Hillsdale, Michigan – substitute

== Coaching staff ==
- Coach: no coach
- Captain: James E. Duffy
- Manager: James D. Armstrong
