= 1888 Chicago Harvard Prep School football team =

American college football season

1888 Harvard Preparatory School of Chicago football

Illinois Champion (Chicago Tribune)
- Record: 6–1 ( )
- Head coach: R. Jocklyn, George Hamlin
- Captain: Bert Hamlin
- Home stadium: Wanderer's Athletic Club grounds

The 1888 Harvard Prep School football team of Chicago represented Harvard School of Chicago during the 1888 college football season. In (at least) their 3rd year fielding a football team (as the school played Michigan in 1887, losing 0–26, and Northwestern in 1886, winning 32–4), the Harvard's as they were called, compiled a 6–1 record (according to one unverified source). They also had a Junior (JV) team, who reportedly won the Junior Championship of Illinois, although this was just a claim, and not an official title or award. The team played at the Wanderer's Athletic Club cricket grounds, on 37th Street and Indiana Avenue. They played two collegiate teams during the football season, defeating Lake Forest, 22 to 4 (or 22–6), and losing to Notre Dame, 20 to 0.

== Schedules ==
=== Varsity team ===
Date	Time	Opponent	Site	Result	Source
October 17		Hyde Park High School	Jackson Park; Chicago, IL	W 32–0	
October 20	3:20 p.m.	West Division High School	Wanderer's Athletic Club cricket grounds	W 78–0	
October 27		Cook County Normal School		W unk.	
November 17	2:30 p.m.	Lake Forest	Wanderer's cricket grounds; Chicago, IL	W 22–4	
November 24		Chicago University Club graduates	Chicago ball park; Chicago, IL	W unk.	
December 6		Notre Dame	South Bend, IL	L 0–20	
December 15		Evanston Athletic Club	Evanston, IL	W unk.	

=== Junior team ===
Date	Opponent	Site	Result
November 3	"The Chamberlins"	Wanderer's Athletic Club cricket grounds; Chicago, IL	W 8–6
November 18	Hyde Park HS	Chicago, IL	W Forfeit
November 29	Hyde Park HS	Chicago, IL	Unknown

==== Practice games ====
Date	Opponent	Site	Result
November 21	Chicago University Club Graduates	Chicago, IL	W 12–0

Notes: An article in the South Bend Tribune on December 6, 1888, reported that Harvard Prep had not lost a contest prior to playing Notre Dame.

== Roster ==
=== 1st Team ===
- Donnelly- Center
- Allen- Rusher
- R. McDermid- Rusher
- Wright- Rusher
- Hoyle- Rusher
- Fair- Rusher
- Marriner- Rusher
- Peoples- Rusher
- Bert Hamlin- Quarterback (Captain)
- George Hamlin- Halfback
- Valentine- Halfback
- Page- Halfback
- Ritchie- Halfback
- Herrick- Fullback
- Neely- Fullback
- Sargent- Fullback
- Crawford

=== Junior team ===
- Thorne- Center
- Young- Rusher
- R. Jocklyn- Rusher
- Wilson- Rusher
- Krouse- Rusher
- McGilvery- Rusher
- McClever- Rusher
- R. Hamlin- Quarterback
- Fargo- Halfback
- Levy- Halfback
- R. McDermid- Fullback
- Harry Hamlin
