= La'Verne Washington =

American soul and R&B musician (born 1956)

- Born: 1956 (age 69–70); Kansas City, Missouri, U.S.
- Education: Langston University
- Occupations: Singer; songwriter; musician
- Years active: 1978–present
- Musical career
- Genres: Soul; R&B
- Website: lvwashingtonmusic.com

La'Verne Washington (born 1956) is an American singer-songwriter and soul musician.

== Early life and education ==
La'Verne E. Washington was born in 1956 and raised in Kansas City, Missouri. She attended the D.A. Holmes School, Southeast High School and the Charlie Parker Academy.

Washington later attended Langston University in Langston, Oklahoma, where she studied communications and vocal music.

== Career ==
In 1978, Washington was crowned "Miss Langston University" and later was on the cover of Ebony Magazine.

In 1984 she released a record which included two singles, "The Promise" and "I Found What I've Been Searching For."

In the mid 1980s, Washington moved to Washington, D.C., where she has been a singer-songwriter and musician in the soul and R&B music scene for over three decades. Washington has performed in D.C., Philadelphia, and throughout various other cities in the United States, including her hometown of Kansas City.

Washington has collaborated with a variety of musical acts and performers throughout her career, including Bonnie Raitt, Jerry Butler, Kathy Sledge, Smokey Robinson, G. C. Cameron, Kim Weston, and Dee Dee Sharp. Washington was a backing vocalist for Sharp and Freda Payne, and has also toured with the gospel group "Emery Shaw and the Voices of Praise" and her own bands, La'Verne Washington and Rococo and the La'Verne Washington Quarter.

From 1985 to 1995, Washington was the African American Program Specialist for the National Endowment for the Arts and led its Media Program. In the role, Washington advocated for increased funding and exposure for African American arts and music in the United States, including Jazz at Lincoln Center and Great Performances. Washington later worked for the Rhythm and Blues Foundation as an Associate Producer of the Pioneer Awards. She also managed the musician support fund which was financially supported by Universal Music Group, Prince, and Berry Gordy.

In 2020, Washington's 1984 LP recordings were remastered and re-released by Melodies International in the U.S., UK, and France, and have seen a resurgence in popularity.

== Awards and recognition ==
The 1978 Ebony Magazine cover which featured Washington is now on display at the National Museum of African American History and Culture.

In 2020, Washington was inducted in the National Black College Alumni Hall of Fame.

American rapper and record producer Tyler, the Creator included Washington's re-release of "I Found What I've Been Searching For" in his list of favorite songs of 2022.

== Discography ==
- The Promise (1984; re-released 2020)
- I Found What I've Been Searching For (1984; re-released 2020)
- You Made Me What I Am (1992)
- Undaunted (2020)
- Love You Just a Little Bit More (2021)
