= Quine (surname) =

Quine is a Manx surname. Notable people with the surname include:

- Dan Quine (born 1967) British computer scientist
- Don Quine (born 1938), American actor and writer, founder of Professional Karate Association
- Edgar Quine (born 1934), Manx politician
- John Quine (1857-1940), Manx clergyman, scholar and writer, The Captain of the Parish
- Richard Quine (1920–1989), American actor and film director
- Robert Quine (1942–2004), American guitarist
- Willard Van Orman Quine (1908–2000), American analytic philosopher and logician
- William Edward Quine (1847–1922), American physician and academic

== See also ==
- Quinn (disambiguation)
