= William Edward Quine =

American physician (1847–1922)

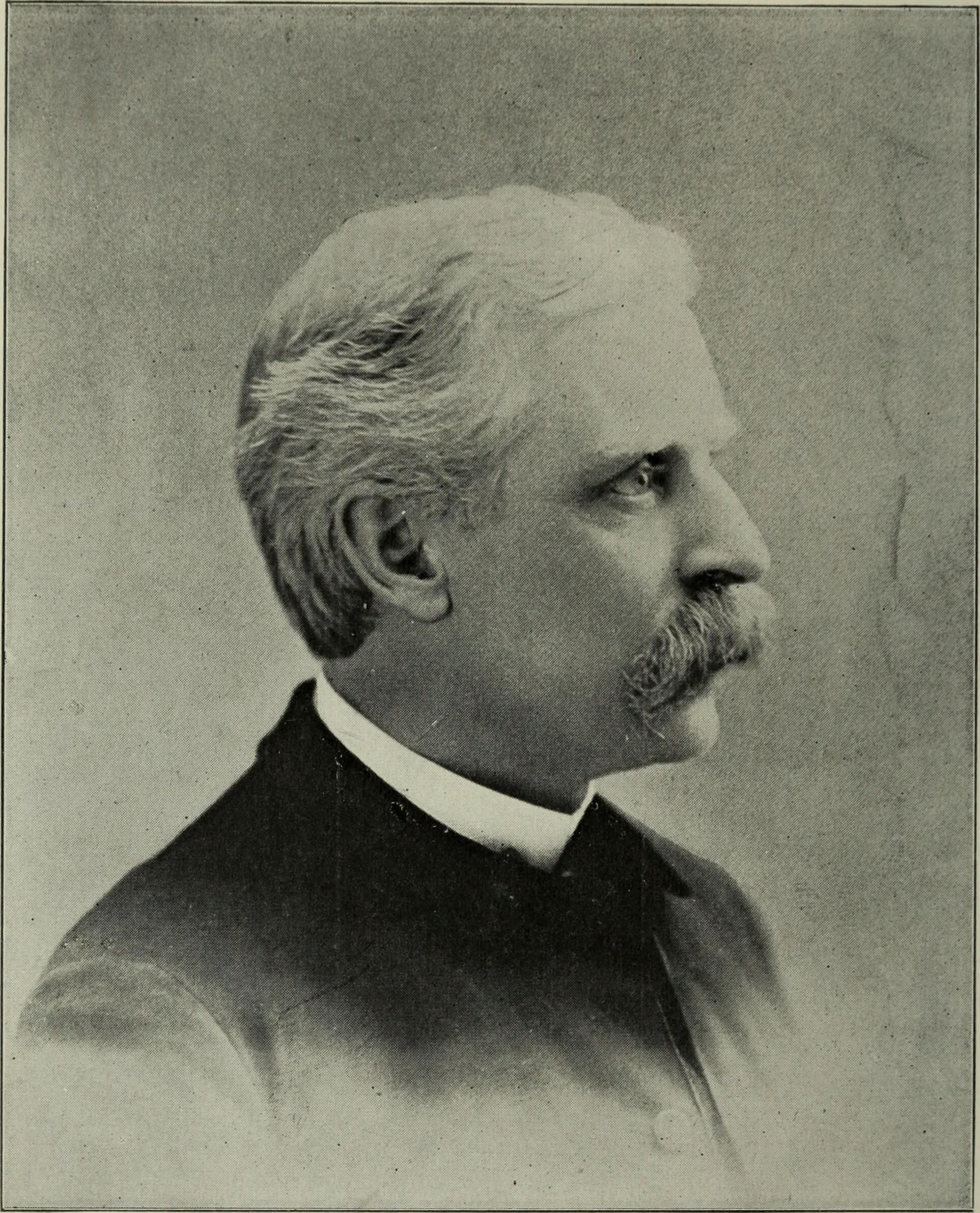
William E. Quine, 1899

William Edward Quine (February 9, 1847 – December 7, 1922) was a Manx American physician, academic, and philanthropist. Immigrating to Chicago, Illinois, United States in 1853, Quine attended the Northwestern University College of Medicine and accepted a professorship there upon his graduation. In 1883, he joined the College of Physicians and Surgeons, where he taught for the rest of his life. From 1892 until the merge with the University of Illinois in 1913, he served as dean. Quine donated funds to build a hospital and four schools in China and established a deaconess in Normal, Illinois.

== Biography ==
William Edward Quine was born in Kirk St. Ann (now Santon), Isle of Man, British Isles on February 9, 1847. He immigrated with his parents to Chicago, Illinois, United States in 1853. He attended Chicago High School, then studied medicine independently while working as a drug store clerk. Quine matriculated at the Northwestern University College of Medicine in 1866. When he graduated in 1869, the school appointed him professor of materia medica and therapeutics. From 1871 to 1883, he was an attending physician to Cook County Hospital and Mercy Hospital.

In 1883, he left the university to join the new College of Physicians and Surgeons. From 1892 to 1913, he was dean of the medical school. He argued on behalf of merging the school with the University of Illinois in 1913. He remained on the staff for the rest of his life. An honorary Legum Doctor was conferred upon him from the school in 1904. For 1910 to 1922, he was on the consulting staffs of St. Luke's Hospital and the Michael Reese Hospital.

Quine was named president of the Chicago Medical Society in 1872. From 1885 to 1889, he was president of the Illinois State Board of Health. In 1904, he accepted the presidency of the Illinois State Medical Society. He founded the library at the University of Illinois College of Medicine in Urbana in 1912, which bears his name. In memory of his daughter, who died in childhood, he founded the Ruth Quine Deaconess in Normal, Illinois. A devout Methodist, Quine donated his house to the Chicago Missionary and Church Extension Society of the Methodist Episcopal Church. Its intended use was as a community house for the African-American Methodist community.

Like Edmund J. James, the president of the University of Illinois, Quine was interested in building ties with China. He built a hospital for women with 100 beds in Zhenjiang. He named it in honor of his wife, who had been a missionary to that nation. Quine also endowed four schools for girls throughout China, each bearing her name. Quine died in Chicago on December 7, 1922, from angina pectoris.
