= McKinley High School (Chicago) =

Location
- 2040 W. Adams Street; Chicago, Illinois; 41°52′45″N 87°40′42″W

Information
- Type: Public secondary school
- Opened: 1875
- Closed: 1954
- Grades: 9–12
- Gender: Coeducational
- Campus type: Urban
- Colors: Orange and black
- Team name: Comets
- Newspaper: The Voice

McKinley High School is a former Chicago public school. It opened in 1875 as West Division High School, was renamed in honor of President McKinley in 1904, and closed in 1954. Since 2009, the building has been the site of Chicago Bulls College Prep high school.

== History ==
West Division High School opened in 1875 as a 9th and 10th-grade school, to relieve congestion at Central High School. By 1882, it, North Division High School, and South Division High School had become four-year high schools and Central was closed. It was initially housed at two elementary schools, but moved to its own building, with 15 classrooms and a capacity of 945 students, in 1877. In 1887 it moved to a second new building, with five stories, 24 classrooms, and a capacity of 1,150. There was an assembly hall on the top floor; a gymnasium was constructed in 1897. In 1901 it moved a third time, to a former streetcar barn, and the building was sold to the College of Physicians & Surgeons, now the University of Illinois College of Medicine.

In 1904 the school moved into its final building, on West Adams Street between Seeley and Hoyne Avenues, and was renamed in honor of President McKinley. It closed in 1954, with students being transferred to Crane Technical High School. It was then the oldest high school in the city. The building became McKinley Upper Grade Center, was later Cregier Vocational High School, then in 1996 became Cregier Multiplex, housing Foundations Elementary School, Nia Elementary School, and Best Practices High School. Since 2009 it has been Chicago Bulls College Prep, a charter high school.

== Extracurricular activities ==
The school had two literary and debating societies, the Washington Irving Society (continued from Central High School) and The Junto Club, started in 1898, and a chapter of the Alpha Psi sorority, started in 1894. Like the Irving Society, the school magazine, The Voice, was the first in a Chicago public school; the sorority chapter may also have been the first in a Chicago high school.

== Sports ==
The school's teams were the Comets. Western was a founder member of the Cook County League in 1889 and McKinley of its successor, the Chicago Public League, in 1913. Sports included track (in which the school had two state champions), football (one league championship, in 1890), softball, tennis, baseball (four league championships), and boys' and girls' basketball. It had a traditional rivalry with nearby Crane, for example in indoor baseball (softball), which was particularly popular on the West Side and which Western was the first Chicago school to adopt as a boys' sport, in 1891–1892.

== Alumni ==
- Margaret Brundage, illustrator and painter
- Walt Disney (freshman year), animator, film producer and entrepreneur (co-founder of The Walt Disney Company)
- Herb Juul, baseball player with the Cincinnati Reds, University of Illinois basketball coach
- Dom Orejudos, ballet dancer, choreographer, artist
- Isaac Sims, Illinois state legislator
- Studs Terkel, author and broadcaster
- James Yacullo, Illinois state representative and lawyer
