= Bruce Grounds =

Baseball ground in Indianapolis, Indiana

Coordinates: 39.797512°N 86.143381°W

Bruce Grounds or Bruce Park, also known as Bruce's Park or Bruce Park grounds, was a baseball ground located in Indianapolis, Indiana. Some sources place it in Broad Ripple, a northern suburb of the city, but that does not fit with contemporary information.

The ground was home to the Indianapolis Hoosiers of the American Association in 1884. It was also used for Sunday games by the Indianapolis Hoosiers of the National League in 1887.

The ball field was located at Bruce (now 23rd) Street and College Avenue. The National League club's primary home was Tinker Park, also known as Seventh Street Park. They staged Sunday games at the old AA park, which was outside the city limits at that time, due to blue laws. The club did not draw well at the site because it was too far from the city center. Sunday games during 1888 and 1889 were held at Indianapolis Park.

Indianapolis city directories have an entry for the park in each year from 1887 through 1893. The location is consistently given as "North side Bruce opposite north end of Greenwood". Greenwood was the last street east of College before the railroad tracks, corresponding to the current Winthrop Avenue. The 1889 Marion County Atlas shows a large block north of Bruce and between College and the tracks, with the owners shown as "J.M. & N.M. Bruce".

The park was eventually sold and developed into residential and commercial buildings.

== See also ==
- List of baseball parks in Indianapolis
