= List of baseball parks in Indianapolis =

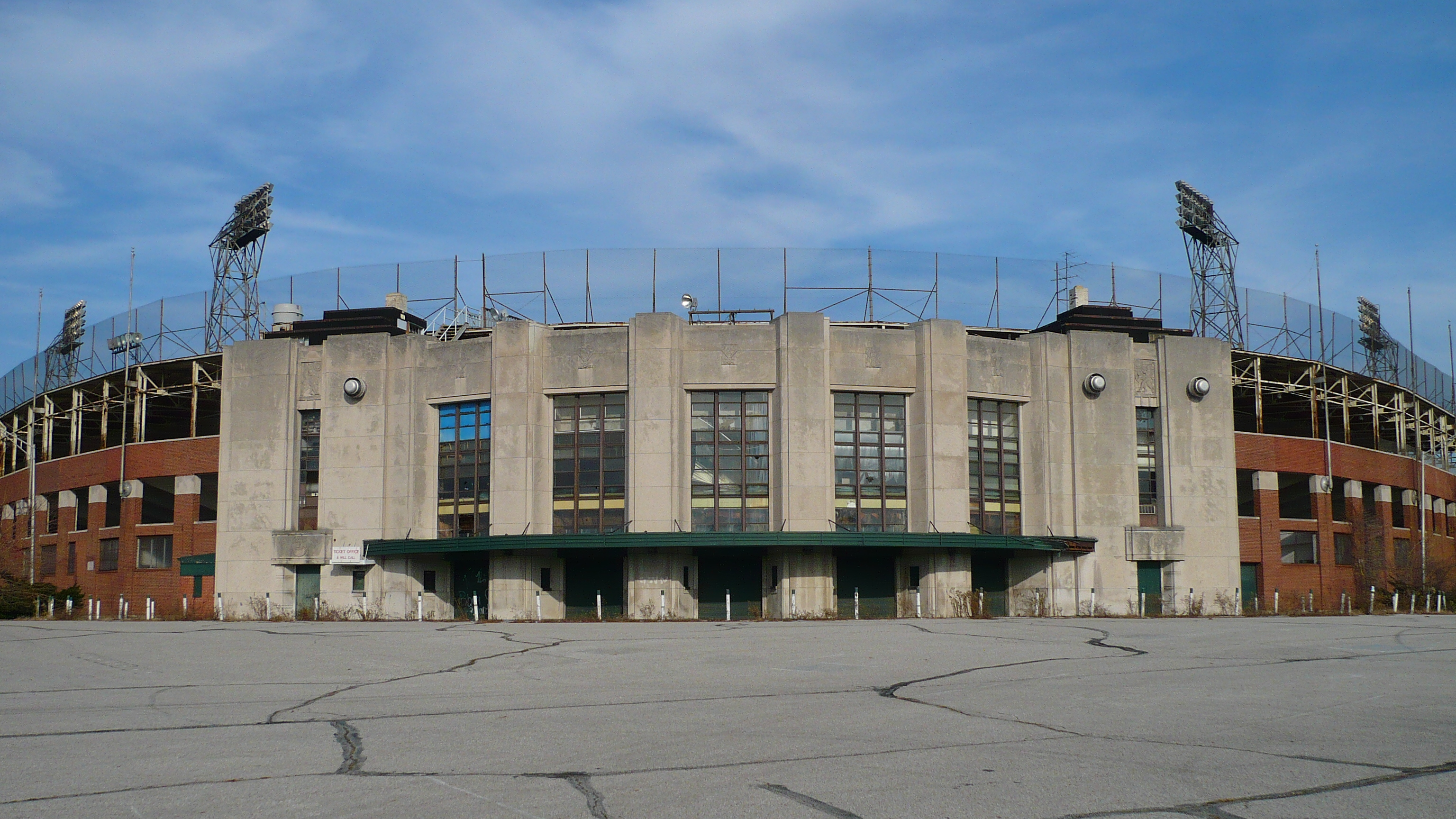
Entrance to Bush Stadium

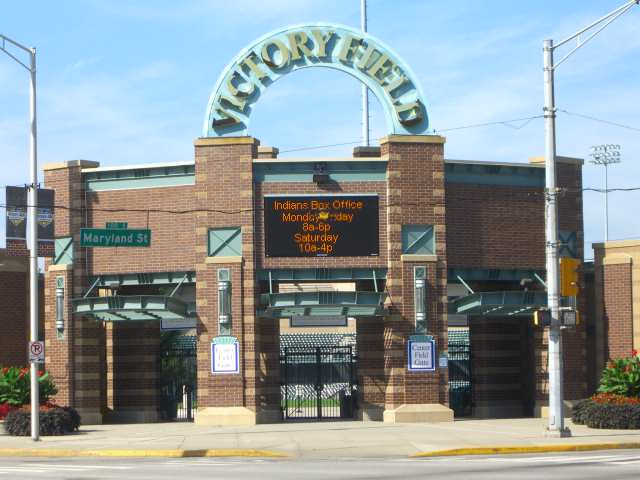
Entrance to Victory Field

This is a list of venues used for professional baseball in Indianapolis, Indiana. The information is a compilation of the information contained in the references listed.

South Street Park
Home of: Indianapolis – League Alliance (1877), National League (1878)
Location: Delaware Avenue (west); South Street (south); Alabama Street (east)
Currently: was Big Four freight houses; now parking lot for Gainbridge Fieldhouse, across the street to the west and northwest

Tinker Park a.k.a. Athletic Park a.k.a. Seventh Street Park
Home of:

Indianapolis – AA (1884) (weekdays)
Indianapolis Hoosiers – NL (1887–1889) (weekdays)

Location: Tinker (later West Seventh, now West 16th) Street (south); North Mississippi Street (now North Senate Avenue) (west); North Tennessee Street (now North Capitol Avenue) (east)
Currently: Methodist Hospital of Indianapolis

Bruce Park
Home of:

Indianapolis – AA (1884) (Sundays only)
Indianapolis Hoosiers – NL (1887) (Sundays only)

Location: Bruce (now 23rd) Street (south); College Avenue (west); railroad tracks (east) [per city directories]
Currently: Residential and commercial

Indianapolis Park a.k.a. East Ohio Street Grounds a.k.a. League Park
Home of:

Indianapolis – Western Inter-State League (1890)
Indianapolis – Western League (1892, 1894–1899)

Location: New York Street (north, left field); Arsenal Avenue (east, right field); East Ohio Street (south, first base); Hanna Street (renamed Oriental Street about 1898) (west, third base) – near or within the former Noble's Pasture - near Market Street
Currently: Residential, commercial, school, church

Washington Park (I)
Home of:

Indianapolis Indians – AL (1900)
Indianapolis - Western Association 1901 (partial season)
Indianapolis - AA (1902–1904)

Location: 3001 East Washington Street (north, left field); Gray Street (east, right field); buildings and Christian Street (west, third base) (approximates Parker Avenue); railroad tracks (south, first base) – built from lumber at East Ohio Street park
Currently: Later site of Wonderland Amusement Park; now commercial, residential

Northwestern Park
Home of Indianapolis ABCs – early Negro League baseball, early 1900s
Location: 17th Street (formerly Holton Place) (to the south, third base); Brighton Boulevard (replaced by Dr. MLK Jr. Street) (to the east, first base)
Currently: Indiana State Police Laboratory

Washington Park (II)
Home of:

Indianapolis Indians – AA (1905–1912), (1915 – mid-1931)
Indianapolis ABCs – Negro National League (1920–1926)

Location: 1205 West Washington Street (north, third base); at about where Harding Avenue T's into Washington; opposite "car barns" and site of Indy Transit System [city directories place it between Brush and Lansing, which were a few short blocks east of the current Harding Avenue]; home plate in northwest corner
Currently: Indianapolis Zoo

Riverside Beach or Riverside Park a.k.a. Federal League Park (I)
Home of: Indianapolis Hoosiers - Federal League (1913)
Location: one source says "30th Street and Riverside Park"; another says "30th Street and the canal"

Federal League Park (II)
Home of:

Indianapolis Hoosiers – FL (1914)

Location: "Kentucky Avenue and West Street"; Kentucky Avenue and railroad tracks (southeast, center field); Oliver Street (south, right field); White River (some distance west, first base); former Greenlawn Cemetery (north, third base); intersection of Kentucky, West and South Street (northeast, half a block away) – a block west of the site of Lucas Oil Stadium, and a block south of Victory Field (II)
Currently: Commercial

Bush Stadium originally Perry Stadium, then Victory Field (I)
Home of:

Indianapolis Indians – AA (mid-1931 – 1962), IL (1963), PCL (1964–1968), AA (1969 – mid-1996)
Indianapolis ABCs (II) – Negro leagues (1931–1933)
Indianapolis Clowns – Negro American League (1946–1950)

Location: 1501 West 16th Street – 16th Street (north, left field); Harding Street (east, right field); parking, buildings and Riverside Drive (west, third base); Waterway Boulevard and White River (south, first base)
Currently: Has been converted to housing units called Stadium Lofts.

Victory Field (II)
Home of: Indianapolis Indians – AA (mid-1996–1997), IL (1998–present)
Location: 501 West Maryland Street – Maryland Street (north, left field); Maryland Street / Washington Street (west, third base); West Street (east, right field);

== See also ==
- Lists of baseball parks
- Sports in Indianapolis
