= Tinker Park =

Former baseball stadium in Indianapolis, Indiana, USA

- Seventh Street Park; Athletic Park
- Interactive map of Tinker Park
- Address: Indianapolis, Indiana; U.S.
- Coordinates: 39°47′20″N 86°9′44″W

Construction
- Years active: 1884, 1887–1889

Tenants
- Indianapolis Blues (1884); Indianapolis Hoosiers (1887–1889)

Tinker Park is a former baseball ground located in Indianapolis, Indiana. The ground was the primary home of the Indianapolis Hoosiers baseball club of the National League from 1887 to 1889, and also of the Indianapolis Blues of the American Association in 1884.

The ballpark was named for Tinker Street, its adjacent street to the south, which was later renamed Seventh Street and then 16th Street. Other names for the ballpark were Athletic Park and Seventh Street Park. Other bordering streets were Mississippi Street (now Senate Avenue) to the west, Tennessee Street (now Capitol Avenue) to the east, and 9th Street (now 18th Street) to the north. In 1884 and 1887, home plate was located in the southeast corner of the site. In 1888, it was moved to the southwest corner. In both configurations the left field was 286 feet (87 m) and the right field was 261 feet (80 m). The ballpark was used for weekday games. Due to blue laws, Sunday games were staged outside the city limits in Bruce Grounds (1887) and Indianapolis Park (1888–1889).

The 1887 Butler Christians football team hosted three games at Athletic Park.

The ballpark site is now occupied by the Methodist Hospital of Indianapolis.

== See also ==
- List of baseball parks in Indianapolis
- List of former Major League Baseball stadiums

== Sources ==
- Peter Filichia, Professional Baseball Franchises, Facts on File, 1993.
- Benson, Michael (1989). Ballparks of North America: A Comprehensive Historical Reference to Baseball Grounds, Yards, and Stadiums, 1845 to Present. Jefferson, N.C.: McFarland. ISBN 0-89950-367-5.
- Lowry, Philip J. (1992). Green Cathedrals: The Ultimate Celebration of All 271 Major League and Negro League Ballparks Past and Present. Reading, Mass.: Addison-Wesley. ISBN 0-201-56777-6.
