= Victory Field =

Baseball stadium in Indianapolis, Indiana, US

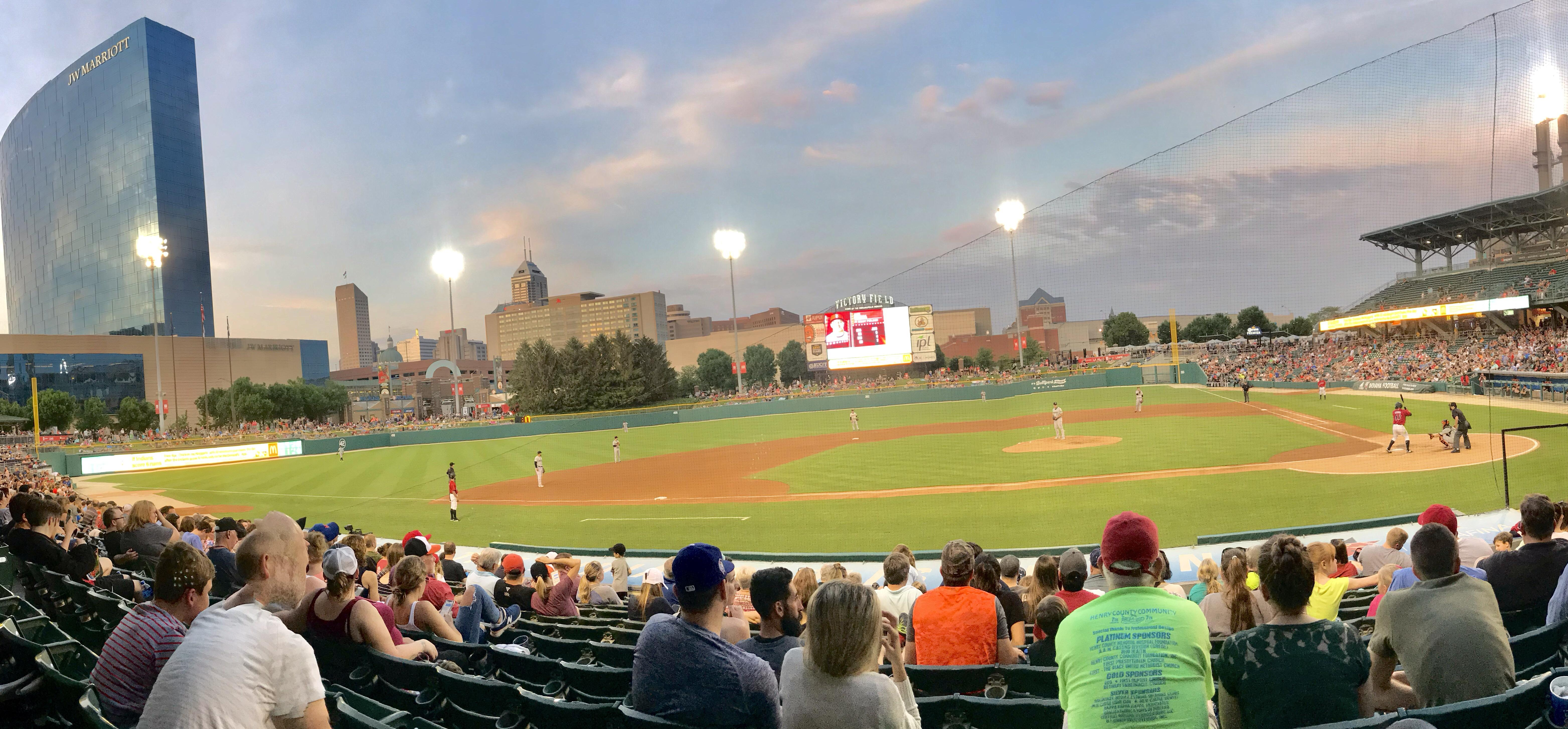
- Victory Field in 2019

- Location within Indiana Location within the United States
- Location: White River State Park, Indianapolis, Indiana, U.S.
- Coordinates: 39°45′54″N 86°10′6″W
- Owner: Capital Improvement Board of Managers of Marion County, Indiana
- Operator: Capital Improvement Board of Managers of Marion County, Indiana
- Capacity: Baseball: 12,230 (fixed seats); 14,230 (lawn and standing room)
- Surface: Kentucky bluegrass
- Field size: Left field: 320 ft (98 m); Left-center field: 418 ft (127 m); Center field: 402 ft (123 m); Right-center field: 362 ft (110 m); Right field: 320 ft (98 m)
- Public transit: 8, 24

Construction
- Groundbreaking: December 16, 1994; 31 years ago
- Opened: July 11, 1996; 30 years ago
- Cost: $20 million ($41.1 million in 2025 dollars)
- Architects: Populous (then HOK Sport); Browning Day Mullins Dierdorf (associate architect)
- Project manager: Geupel DeMars Hagerman
- Structural engineers: Fink Roberts & Petrie, Inc.
- Services engineers: Bredson & Associates, Inc.
- General contractor: Huber, Hunt & Nichols, Inc.

Tenant
- Indianapolis Indians (AA/IL) 1996–present

Website
- www.milb.com/indianapolis/ballpark

Victory Field is a minor league ballpark in downtown Indianapolis, Indiana, United States. It is home to the Indianapolis Indians of the International League.

== History ==
Victory Field opened on July 11, 1996, with the Indians falling to the Oklahoma City 89ers, 5–3, in front of 14,667 fans. It replaced Bush Stadium, which had also been called Victory Field for 25 years from 1942 to 1967. The new park seated 13,300 fans (15,696 with lawn seating) when it was opened. However, in 2005, a 1,000-seat bleacher section was removed to make room for a picnic area. The name reflects the victory of the United States in World War II. The opening of Victory Field in 1996 was the catalyst for a revitalization of downtown Indianapolis.

A record 16,168 fans were in attendance on July 22, 2000, to witness the Indians lose to the Columbus Clippers 6–5. In 2023, the Indians drew an average home attendance of 7,842 in 71 home games, the 4th highest in Minor League Baseball.

The stadium hosted the 2001 Triple-A All-Star Game in which the Pacific Coast League All-Stars defeated the International League All-Stars, 9–5.

The Indiana Hoosiers baseball team has played one game each year at Victory Field since 2015.

The IHSAA uses Victory Field for its state final baseball matches.

In 2021, a six-person panel of American Institute of Architects (AIA) Indianapolis members identified the ballpark to be among the ten most "architecturally significant" buildings completed in the city since World War II.

== Features ==
Victory Field has been recognized as the "Best Minor League Ballpark in America" by Baseball America and Sports Illustrated. It was ranked the sixth-best by Baseball America in their 2015 survey.

The stadium has 12,230 permanent seats and room for 2,000 more fans on the outfield lawn. On popular days such as Independence Day, attendance has exceeded 15,000 including standing room only. Victory Field also features 28 luxury suites, five suite-level party areas, and two picnic areas.

Seating sections include:

- Box: 6,935 (Lower: 5,418; Upper: 1,517)
- Reserved: 3,760 (Lower: 1,647; Upper: 2,113)
- Lawn: 2,000
- Yuengling Landing: 116 (plus 80 standing-room only tickets)
- Elements Financial Club: 132 (plus 100 standing-room only tickets)
- Suite level: 543
- Wheelchair: 240

Sports venues Lucas Oil Stadium, Gainbridge Fieldhouse, the Indiana University Natatorium, and the Michael A. Carroll Track & Soccer Stadium are located nearby.

=== Seating capacity ===
The seating capacity has changed over the years:

- 13,500, 15,696 with lawn seating (1996–2004)
- 12,500, 14,500 with lawn seating (2005–2010)
- 12,200, 14,200 with lawn seating (2011)
- 12,202, 14,202 with lawn seating (2012)
- 12,230, 14,230 with lawn seating (2013–present)

== Improvements ==
Several changes were made to the ballpark between the 2009 and 2010 seasons. Most notably, crews installed a new HD video display that spans the left field wall and measures 6 1/2 feet (2.0 m) tall by 120 feet (37 m) wide. The new digital board, which has the highest resolution (16mm) of any display in Minor League Baseball, features interactive messages, advertisements, and live scores and statistics. The Indians invested approximately $600,000 in the new digital display which was designed by Daktronics.

With the arrival of the 2021 season, the Elements Financial Club opened on the upper level behind home plate. The area offers premium ticket options for up to 200 fans, including access to a climate-controlled interior lounge with a full-service bar.

== See also ==
- List of International League stadiums
- List of baseball parks in Indianapolis
- List of attractions and events in Indianapolis
- List of U.S. baseball stadiums by capacity

Events and tenants
Preceded by Bush Stadium	Home of the Indianapolis Indians; 1996 – present	Succeeded by current
