= Bush Stadium =

Baseball stadium in Indianapolis, Indiana (1931–1996)

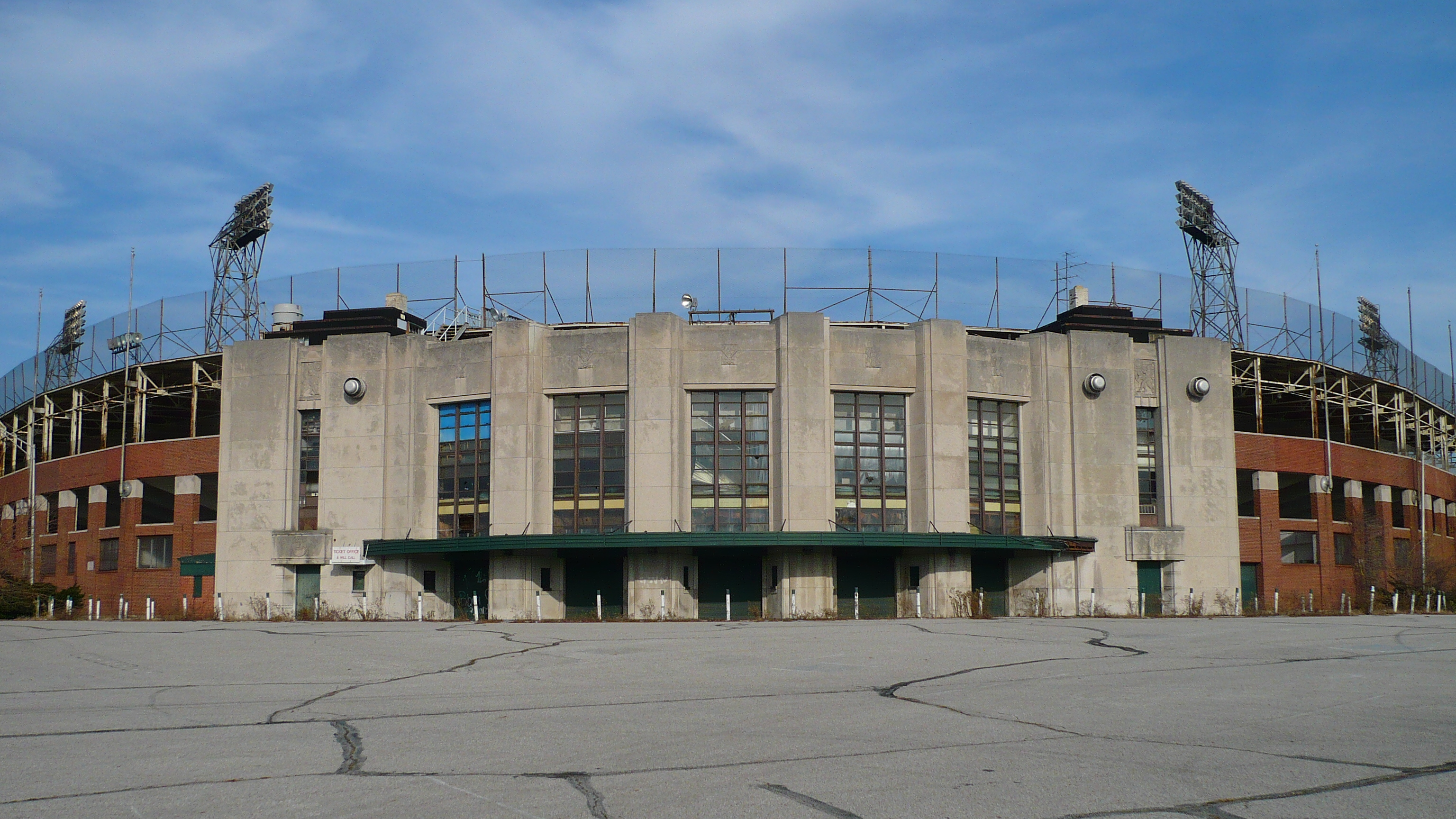
- Bush Stadium in 2009 prior to the demolition of the grandstands. The light tower and facade have since been incorporated into a new building.

- Location within Indiana Location within the United States
- Interactive map of Bush Stadium
- Full name: Owen J. Bush Stadium
- Former names: Perry Stadium (1931–1942); Victory Field (1942–1967)
- Address: 1501 West 16th Street; Indianapolis, Indiana, U.S.
- Owner: Indianapolis Indians/Norm Perry (1931–1967); City of Indianapolis (1967–2001)
- Operator: Indianapolis Indians/ (1931–1967); Indianapolis Parks Department (1967–2001)
- Capacity: 15,000 (1931–1937); 13,000 (1938–1946); 13,254 (1947–1979); 12,934 (1980–1996)
- Surface: Grass
- Field size: Left Field – 335 ft (102 m); Left Center Field – 350 ft (110 m); Deep Left Center – 405 ft (123 m); Center Field Inner Fence – 395 ft (120 m); Deep Right Center – 405 ft (123 m); Right Center Field – 350 ft (110 m); Right Field – 335 ft (102 m)

Construction
- Groundbreaking: 1931
- Closed: 2001
- Cost: $500,000 ($8.51 million in 2025 dollars)
- Architects: Pierre & Wright; Osborn Engineering Company
- General contractor: William P. Jungclaus Company

Tenants
- Indianapolis Indians (AA/IL/PCL) 1931–1996; Indianapolis ABCs II (NNL I/NSL/NNL II) 1931–1933; Cole's American Giants (NNL II) 1933; Indianapolis Athletics (NAL) 1937; Indianapolis ABCs III (NAL) 1939; Indianapolis Crawfords (NAL) 1940; Indianapolis Clowns (NAL) 1944–1950; Indianapolis Capitols (CnFL/ACFL) 1968–1970
- Bush Stadium
- U.S. National Register of Historic Places
- Location within Indianapolis Location within Indiana Location within the United States
- Location: Indianapolis, Indiana
- Coordinates: 39°47′17″N 86°11′19″W
- Built: 1931
- Architectural style: Art Deco
- NRHP reference No.: 95000703
- Added to NRHP: June 26, 1995

Owen J. Bush Stadium was a baseball stadium in Indianapolis, Indiana, United States. It was home to the Indianapolis Indians from 1931 to 1996. It was also home to a few Negro league teams, as well as a Continental Football League team, the Indianapolis Capitols, who won the league's final championship in 1969. The stadium closed in 2001, and since 2014, has been converted into apartments.

== History ==
=== Construction ===
Bush Stadium was commissioned by Norm Perry, owner of the Indianapolis Indians baseball club, in 1931. The facility was originally named Perry Stadium as a memorial to his brother Jim, the former owner of the club who had died in a plane crash during a solo flight from Schoen Field on the eastside of Indianapolis in 1929. The $350,000 stadium was designed by Osborn Engineering of Cleveland, Ohio, and built by the William P. Jungclaus Company of Indianapolis. The firm also built Yankee Stadium and constructed or renovated nearly 25 steel and concrete stadiums across America.

Construction began in late May 1931 and Perry set the inaugural game for September 5, 1931. By late August much remained to be done: The grandstand roof was incomplete. The 13,000 grandstand seats and right field bleachers were not completed until the week before the first game. The game was held despite the main entrance, lobby, and administrative offices not being finished until a few weeks later. Initially there was no stadium lighting because the lighting that had recently been installed at Washington Park was to be moved to the new stadium. The Indians lost to the Louisville Colonels, 3–4.

English ivy was planted on the brick outfield walls of Perry Stadium prior to its opening. P. K. Wrigley liked the appearance of the ivy, and subsequently instructed the iconic Wrigley Field ivy in Chicago to be planted. The ivy in Indianapolis remained until 1996, when the Indians moved to the current Victory Field ballpark downtown.

The formal dedication was held on July 1, 1932, in which the Indians again lost to Louisville, 6–11.

=== Negro League park ===
During the 1930s, Perry Stadium was home to many Negro league teams. These included the ABCs (1932, 1938, and 1939), American Giants (1933), Athletics (1937) and Crawfords (1940). Later, it would be home to the Indianapolis Clowns, a barnstorming team that was well known for "comical antics". The Clowns won the Negro American League championship in 1952, with the help of Hank Aaron. They played in Indianapolis from 1944 to 1962. Later, the Clowns featured Toni Stone, the first female Negro leagues player in history. Even after the Indianapolis Indians integrated in 1952, the Clowns continued to play at the stadium.

=== Victory Field ===
Perry Stadium was renamed Victory Field on January 21, 1942. The name was the winning entry of a fan contest held by the club's new owners, which yielded more than 60 suggestions. The day of its renaming, the Indianapolis News stated that the renaming was chosen "because of its timeliness with current affairs; its popularity among [contest] proposals; and its possibilities for elaborate public displays".

After Perry sold the baseball club to Frank E. McKinney and former player Donie Bush that year, he retained ownership of the stadium.

In 1967, the ballpark was sold to the city of Indianapolis, who leased it back to the Indians. On August 30, 1967, it was renamed for Bush, who had served as president of the Indians from 1955 to 1969.

=== Alternative uses of the facility ===
In 1987, Bush Stadium was dressed up in different ways to be used as the stand-in for both Comiskey Park and Crosley Field during the filming of Eight Men Out, which was about the "Black Sox Scandal", the throwing of the 1919 World Series.

Indianapolis also hosted the Pan Am Games in 1987, and the baseball tournament was held at Bush Stadium.

=== Decline ===
Starting in the 1980s, maintenance problems became more pronounced as the stadium's physical structure deteriorated. In 1985, the city studied what would be needed to upgrade the ballpark in order to attract a Major League team. The initial study indicated that the size and condition of the playing field were adequate, but that seating would need to be increased to at least 40,000, and that the ancillary areas (dugouts, bullpens, concession stands, and ticket booths) would eventually need to be upgraded.

A second study that looked at the issue of parking said that between $9.8 million and $52.3 million would be needed for additional parking, with another $22 million for street improvements to handle the additional traffic. On May 9, 1985, Mayor Bill Hudnut recommended to the parks board that it not move ahead with the project, citing the cost and the disruption to the neighborhoods around the stadium.

By 1990 the conditions at the stadium were dire. There were numerous plumbing and water problems among other issues. In a June 15, 1985, letter, the team's chairman of the board described the "terrible state of Bush stadium" and asked that control of the stadium be transferred from the parks board to the city's Capital Improvement Board.

In August 1993, the National Association of Professional Baseball Leagues warned that either major repairs needed to be done or a new stadium constructed; failure to do so could result in the transfer of the team to another city. A study by the Capital Improvements Board estimated that repairs to Bush Stadium would cost $16.3 million while a new stadium downtown would cost $18 million. A downtown stadium was projected to double attendance and add millions to the downtown economy, so that option was taken.

The 1995 season of the Indians was marketed as the "Bush Stadium Sunset Season". The final game was played on July 3, 1996, and the first game at the new Victory Field at White River State Park was played on July 11.

=== The stadium after baseball ===
In 1997, Tony George, president of the nearby Indianapolis Motor Speedway, leased the property and converted it into a dirt track named the 16th Street Speedway for midget car auto racing. The ivy was removed from the outfield walls around this time. As happened with a similar venture involving Philadelphia's Baker Bowl several decades earlier, the auto racing venture failed (after two years). The property closed and the stadium fell into disrepair, with no apparent future. The Indy Parks Department had control of the land, which was zoned as a park. At the time, it was estimated that renovations, which would include removal of asbestos and lead paint, could cost around $10 million.

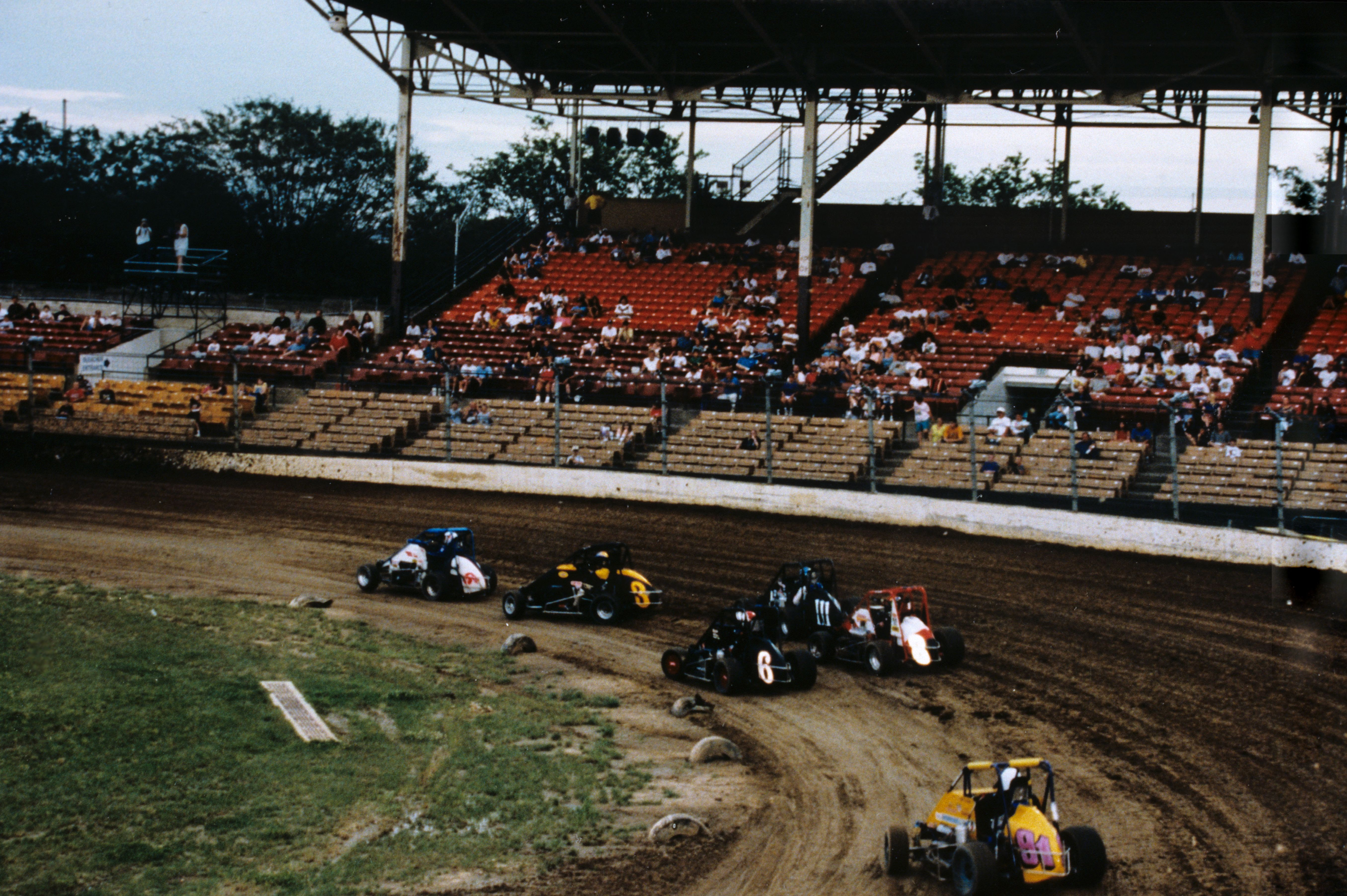
Ballpark following its conversion into a dirt car race track (ca. late 1990s)

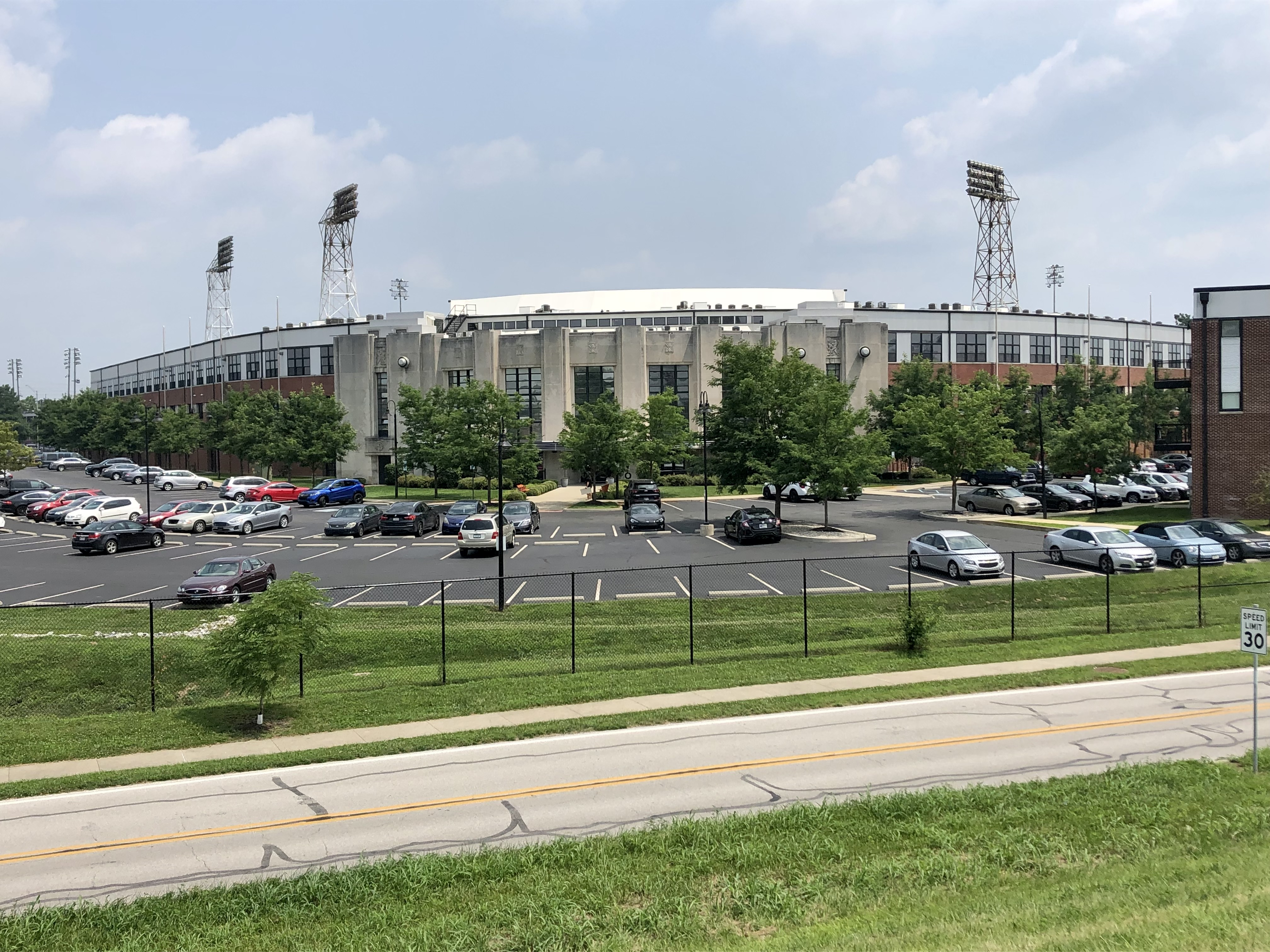
Former Bush Stadium following its conversion to apartments (2021)

Between 2008 and 2011 the Stadium was used as a storage site for cars traded in as part of the Cash for Clunkers program.

In 2011, it was proposed that the stadium be turned into an apartment complex, and on March 15, 2012, demolition began on portions of the 81-year-old structure. The 138 loft units were completely leased when the complex opened on July 27, 2013.

The dirt portion of the infield has now been paved with stamped red concrete, but the lights that lit up the field at night still stand. Much of the exterior façade has been preserved, and many of the historic features, such as the owner's suite and the ticket booth, have been incorporated into the loft apartments. There are studio, one, and two-bedroom units in the complex. The cost of the project was $13 million, of which the city funded $5 million. The Stadium Lofts complex includes both the loft apartments within the former stadium building and newly constructed flats.

== Dimensions ==
Original

- Left Field – 350 ft (110 m)
- Left Center Field – 365 ft (111 m)
- Center Field Corner – 500 ft (150 m)
- Right Center Field – 365 ft (111 m)
- Right Field – 350 ft (110 m)

1945 (home plate moved about 20 feet toward center field)

- Left Field – 335 ft (102 m)
- Left Center Field – 350 ft (110 m)
- Center Field Corner – 480 ft (150 m)
- Right Center Field – 350 ft (110 m)
- Right Field – 335 ft (102 m)

1967 (inner fence constructed across center field)

- Left Field – 335 ft (102 m)
- Left Center Field – 350 ft (110 m)
- Deep Left Center – 405 ft (123 m)
- Center Field Inner Fence – 395 ft (120 m)
- Deep Right Center – 405 ft (123 m)
- Right Center Field – 350 ft (110 m)
- Right Field – 335 ft (102 m)

== See also ==
- List of baseball parks in Indianapolis
- List of International League stadiums
- List of Art Deco architecture in Indiana
- National Register of Historic Places listings in Center Township, Marion County, Indiana
