= Indianapolis Park =

Baseball ground in Indianapolis, Indiana

Coordinates: 39.770803°N 86.134445°W

Indianapolis Park or Athletic Park (II) or League Park was a baseball ground in Indianapolis, Indiana.

Some sources say it was the Sunday home field of the Indianapolis Hoosiers baseball club of the National League from 1888 to 1889.

However, the Retrosheet team pages for Indianapolis in 1888 and 1889 indicate that the only park the club used in those seasons was the Seventh Street Park, i.e. Tinker Park. A close review of the game logs for those two seasons reveals that the club played no Sunday games at all, either at home or on the road.

The ballpark was located on a block bounded by New York Street (north, left field); Arsenal Avenue (east, right field); Ohio Street (south, first base); and Hanna Street (now Oriental Street) (west, third base).

The minor league ball club in the Western League played its home games at this ballpark during the 1890s, until the first Washington Park opened in 1900.

The ballpark site is now occupied by a residential neighborhood.

== See also ==
- List of baseball parks in Indianapolis

== Sources ==
- Peter Filichia, Professional Baseball Franchises, Facts on File, 1993.
- Benson, Michael (1989). Ballparks of North America: A Comprehensive Historical Reference to Baseball Grounds, Yards, and Stadiums, 1845 to Present. Jefferson, N.C.: McFarland. ISBN 0-89950-367-5.
- Lowry, Philip J. (1992). Green Cathedrals: The Ultimate Celebration of All 271 Major League and Negro League Ballparks Past and Present. Reading, Mass.: Addison-Wesley. ISBN 0-201-56777-6.
