= List of International League stadiums =

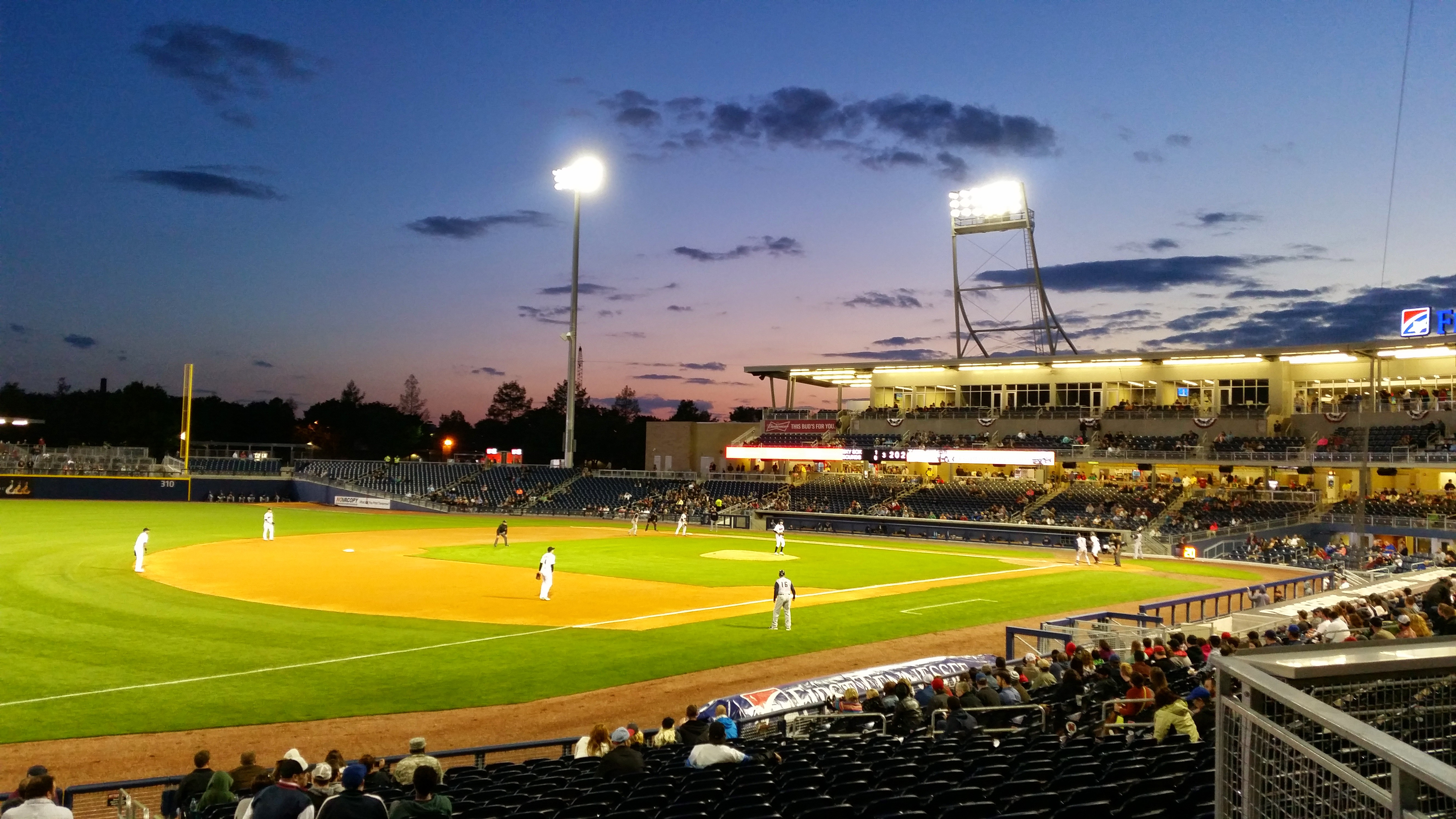
First Horizon Park, one of the newest stadiums in the International League, opened in 2015. It is the home of the Nashville Sounds.

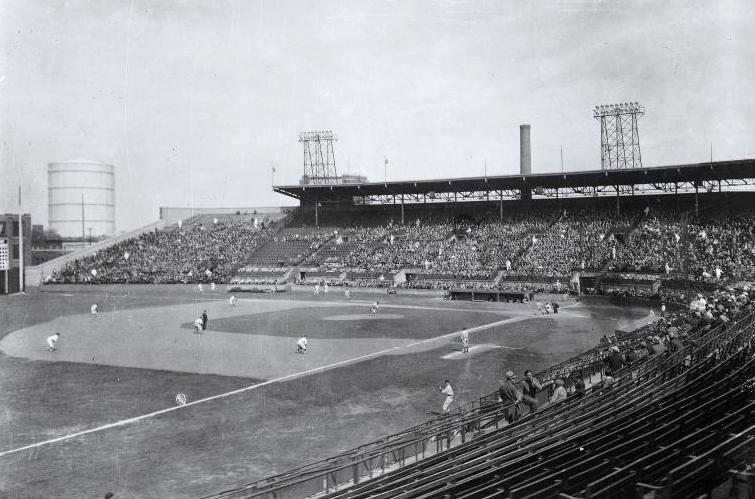
Delorimier Stadium opened in 1928 and was the home of the Montreal Royals.

There are 20 stadiums in use by International League (IL) baseball teams. The oldest stadium is Sahlen Field, home of the Buffalo Bisons, which was built in 1988. The newest stadium is Polar Park, home of the Worcester Red Sox, which opened in 2021. Two stadiums were built in the 1980s, six in the 1990s, seven in the 2000s, four in the 2010s, and one in the 2020s. The highest seating capacity of all active stadiums is 16,600 at Buffalo's Sahlen Field. The stadium with the lowest capacity is CHS Field, the home of the St. Paul Saints, which seats 7,210. All stadiums use a grass surface.

Some 100 additional ballparks located among over 60 municipalities formerly hosted International League teams since the league's formation in 1884. These include stadiums from the Eastern League (1884), New York State League (1885), International Association (1888-1890), and Eastern Association (1891), each of which league officials consider part of its origins, and the Eastern League (1892–1911), which changed its name to the International League in 1912. Of the stadiums with known opening dates, the oldest to have hosted IL games was Pynchon Park (1853), home of the Springfield Cubs and Springfield Ponies; Polar Park is also the newest of all stadiums to host IL games. The highest known seating capacity was 55,000 at Municipal Stadium, the Baltimore Orioles home, which was designed to host football. The stadium with the lowest known capacity was the Barnum Grounds, home of the Bridgeport Giants, which seated only 800.

== Active stadiums ==
| Name | Team | City | State | Opened | Capacity | Ref. |
|---|---|---|---|---|---|---|
| AutoZone Park | Memphis Redbirds | Memphis | Tennessee | 2000 | 10,000 | |
| CHS Field | St. Paul Saints | Saint Paul | Minnesota | 2015 | 7,210 | |
| Coca-Cola Park | Lehigh Valley IronPigs | Allentown | Pennsylvania | 2008 | 10,100 | |
| Durham Bulls Athletic Park | Durham Bulls | Durham | North Carolina | 1995 | 10,000 | |
| ESL Ballpark | Rochester Red Wings | Rochester | New York | 1997 | 10,840 | |
| Fifth Third Field | Toledo Mud Hens | Toledo | Ohio | 2002 | 10,300 | |
| First Horizon Park | Nashville Sounds | Nashville | Tennessee | 2015 | 10,000 | |
| Gwinnett Field | Gwinnett Stripers | Lawrenceville | Georgia | 2009 | 10,427 | |
| Harbor Park | Norfolk Tides | Norfolk | Virginia | 1993 | 11,856 | |
| Huntington Park | Columbus Clippers | Columbus | Ohio | 2009 | 10,100 | |
| Louisville Slugger Field | Louisville Bats | Louisville | Kentucky | 2000 | 13,131 | |
| NBT Bank Stadium | Syracuse Mets | Syracuse | New York | 1997 | 10,815 | |
| PNC Field | Scranton/Wilkes-Barre Highlanders | Moosic | Pennsylvania | 1989 | 10,000 | |
| Polar Park | Worcester Red Sox | Worcester | Massachusetts | 2021 | 9,508 | |
| Principal Park | Iowa Cubs | Des Moines | Iowa | 1992 | 11,500 | |
| Sahlen Field | Buffalo Bisons | Buffalo | New York | 1988 | 16,600 | |
| Truist Field | Charlotte Knights | Charlotte | North Carolina | 2014 | 10,200 | |
| Victory Field | Indianapolis Indians | Indianapolis | Indiana | 1996 | 13,750 | |
| VyStar Ballpark | Jacksonville Jumbo Shrimp | Jacksonville | Florida | 2003 | 11,000 | |
| Werner Park | Omaha Storm Chasers | Papillon | Nebraska | 2011 | 9,023 | |

=== Map ===
Current stadium locations:
- East Division
- West Division

=== Gallery ===
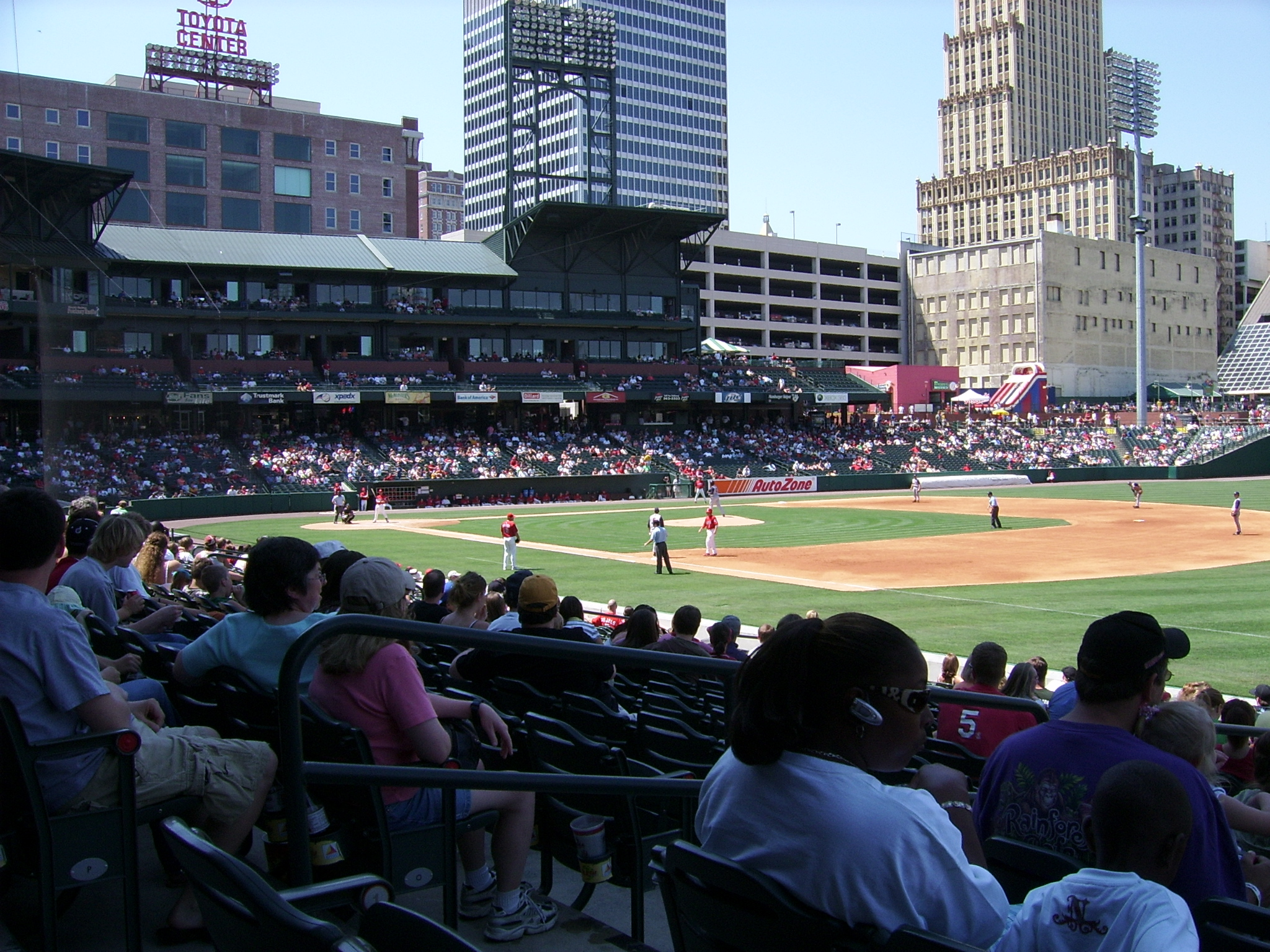
AutoZone Park (Memphis Redbirds)

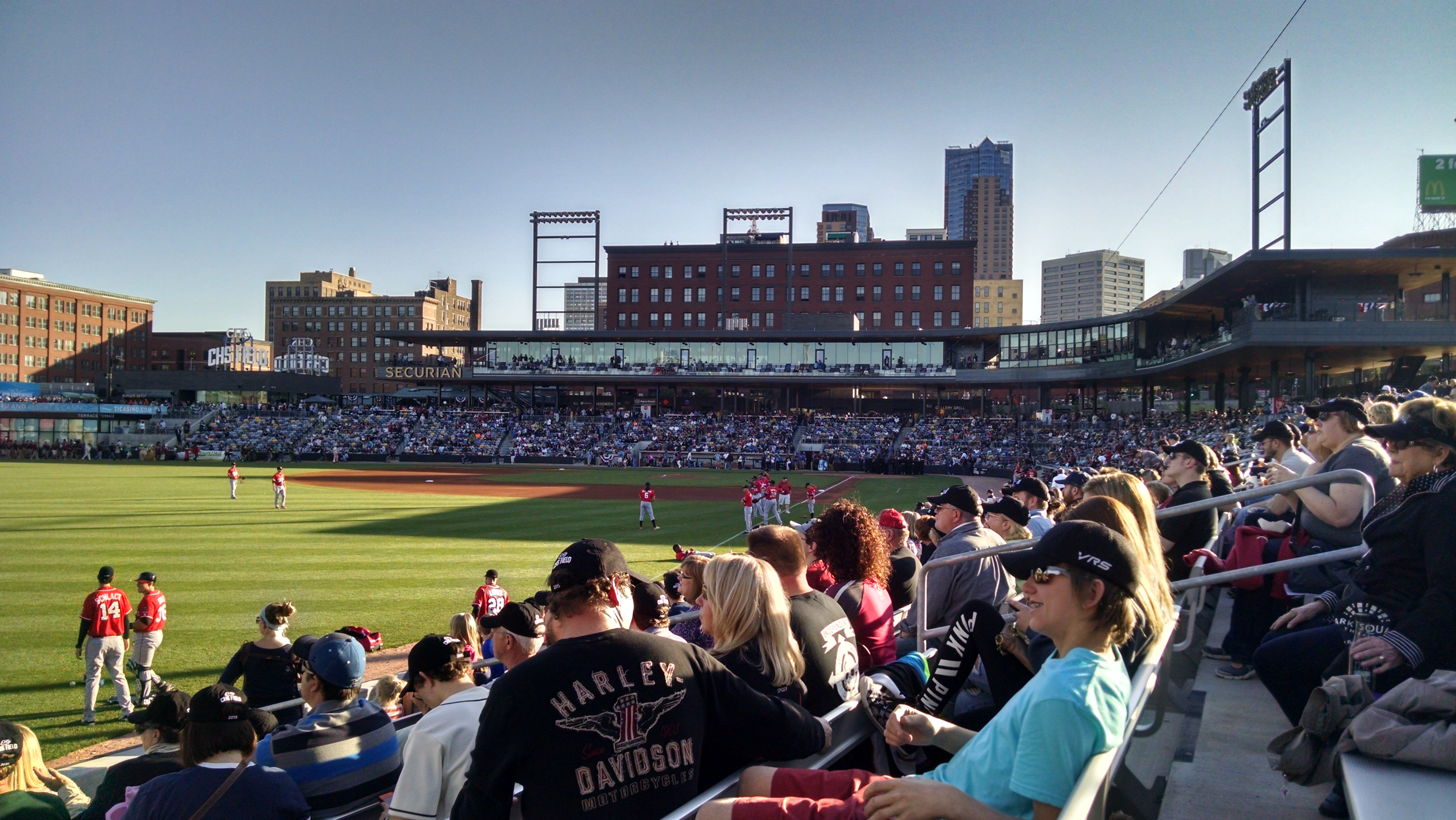
CHS Field (St. Paul Saints)

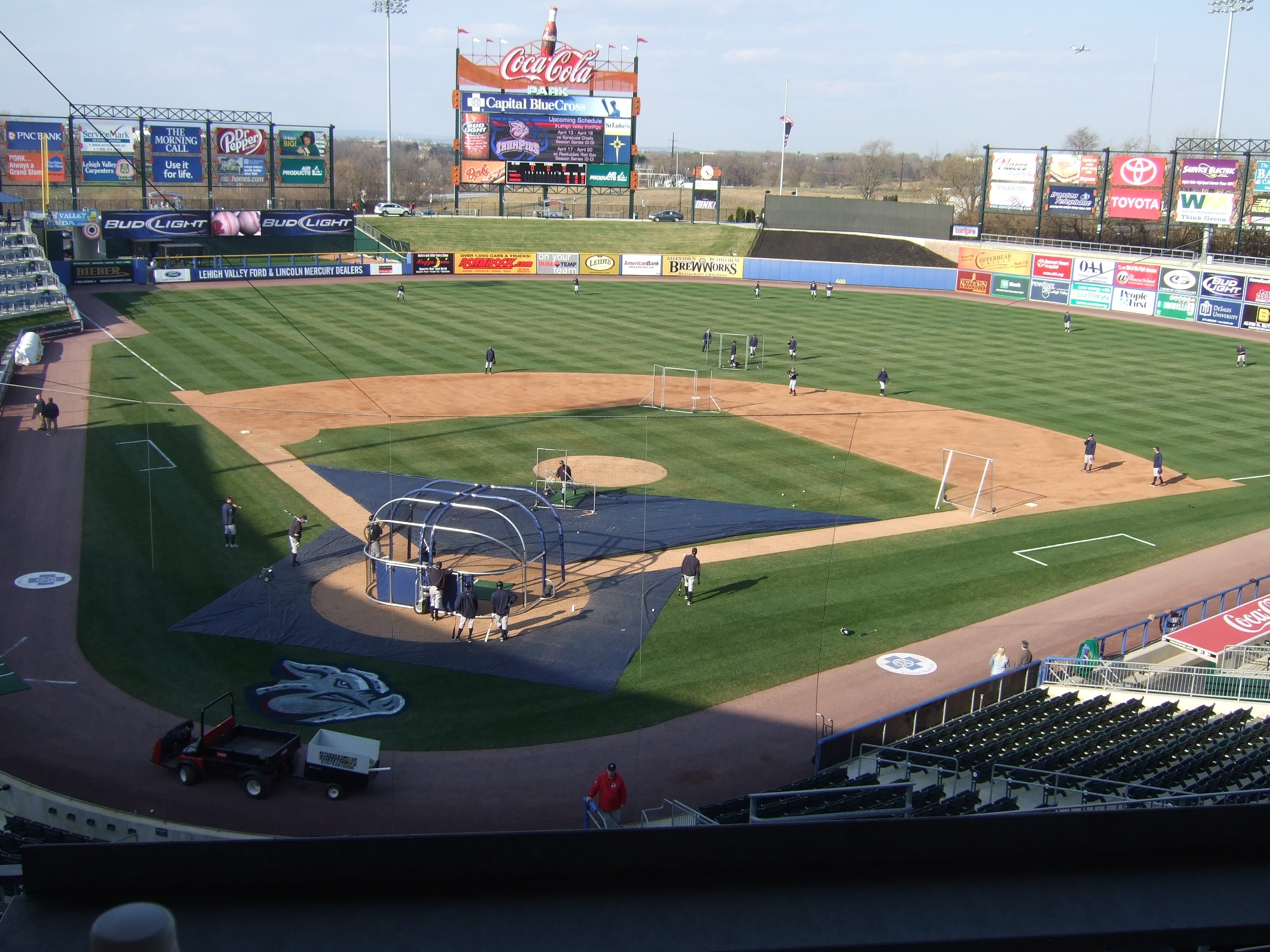
Coca-Cola Park (Lehigh Valley IronPigs)

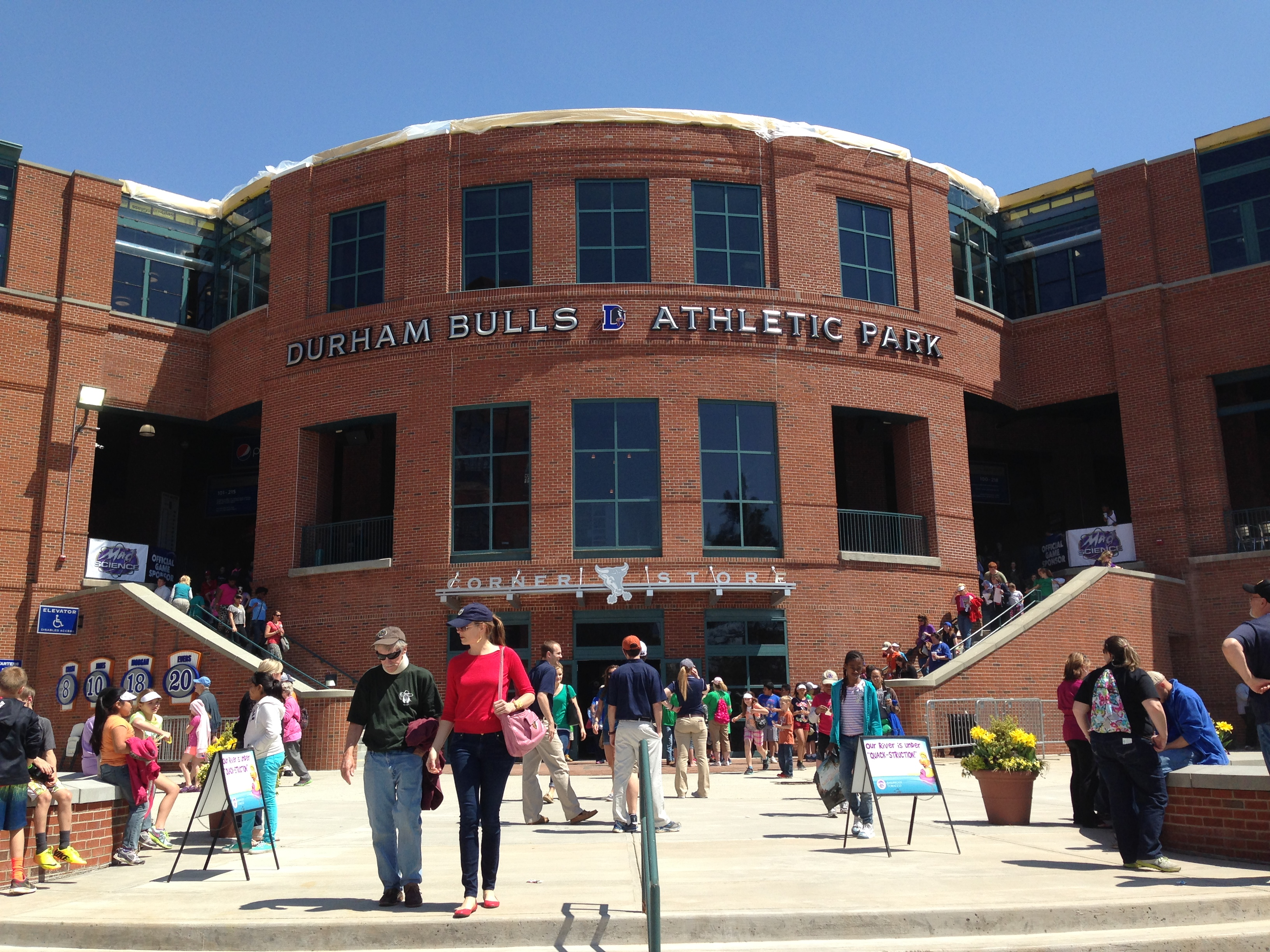
Durham Bulls Athletic Park (Durham Bulls)

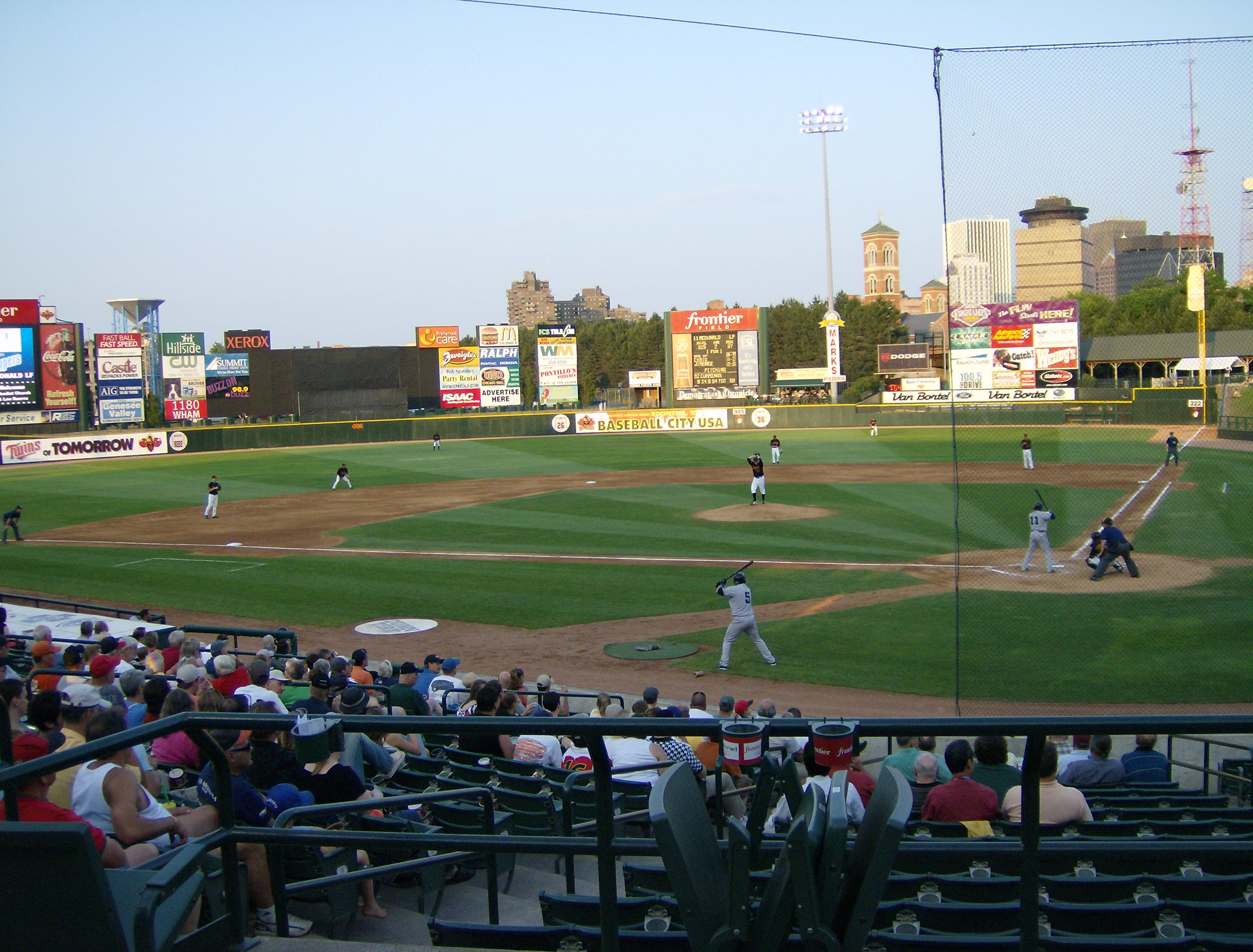
ESL Ballpark (Rochester Red Wings)

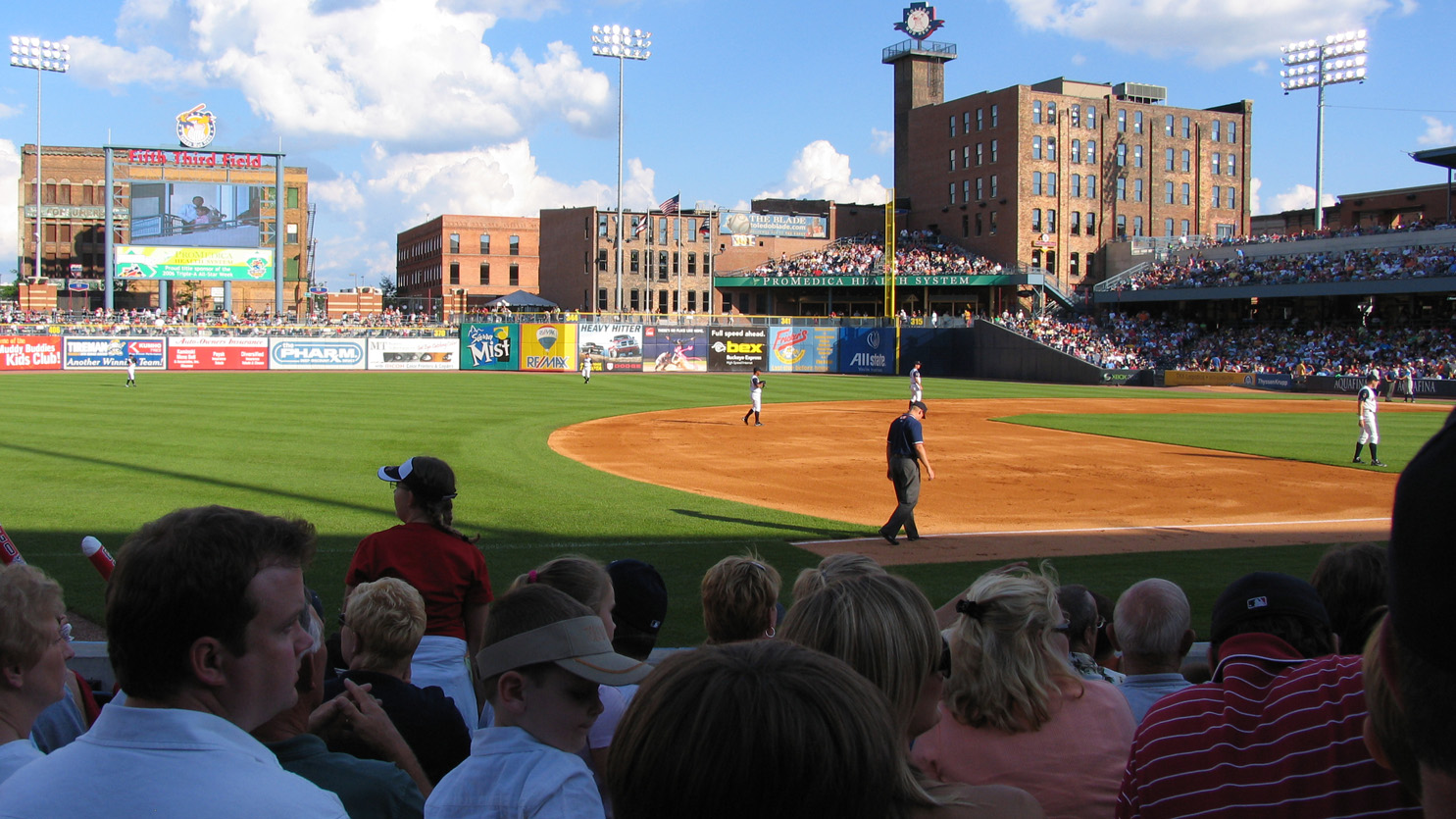
Fifth Third Field (Toledo Mud Hens)

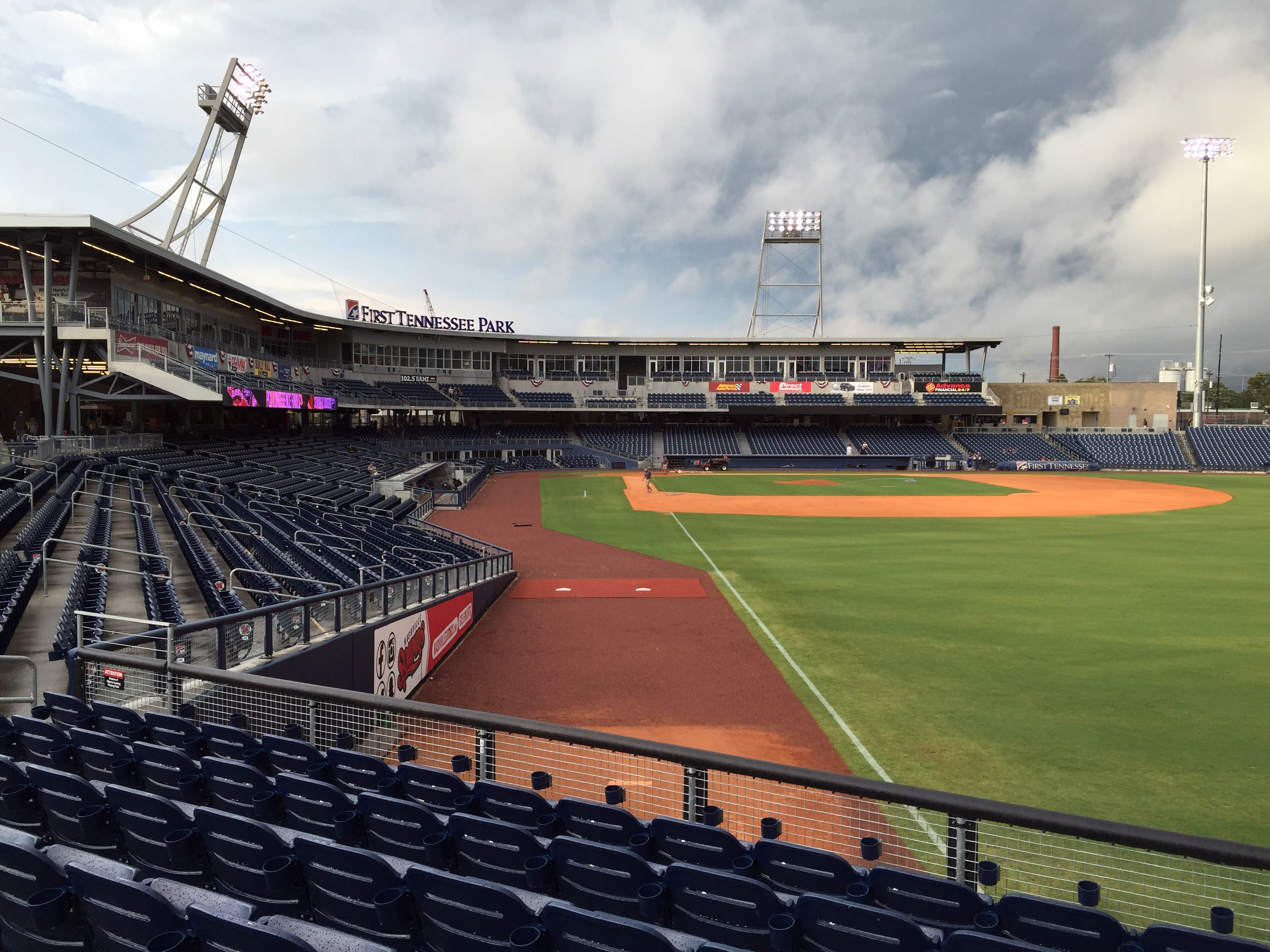
First Horizon Park (Nashville Sounds)

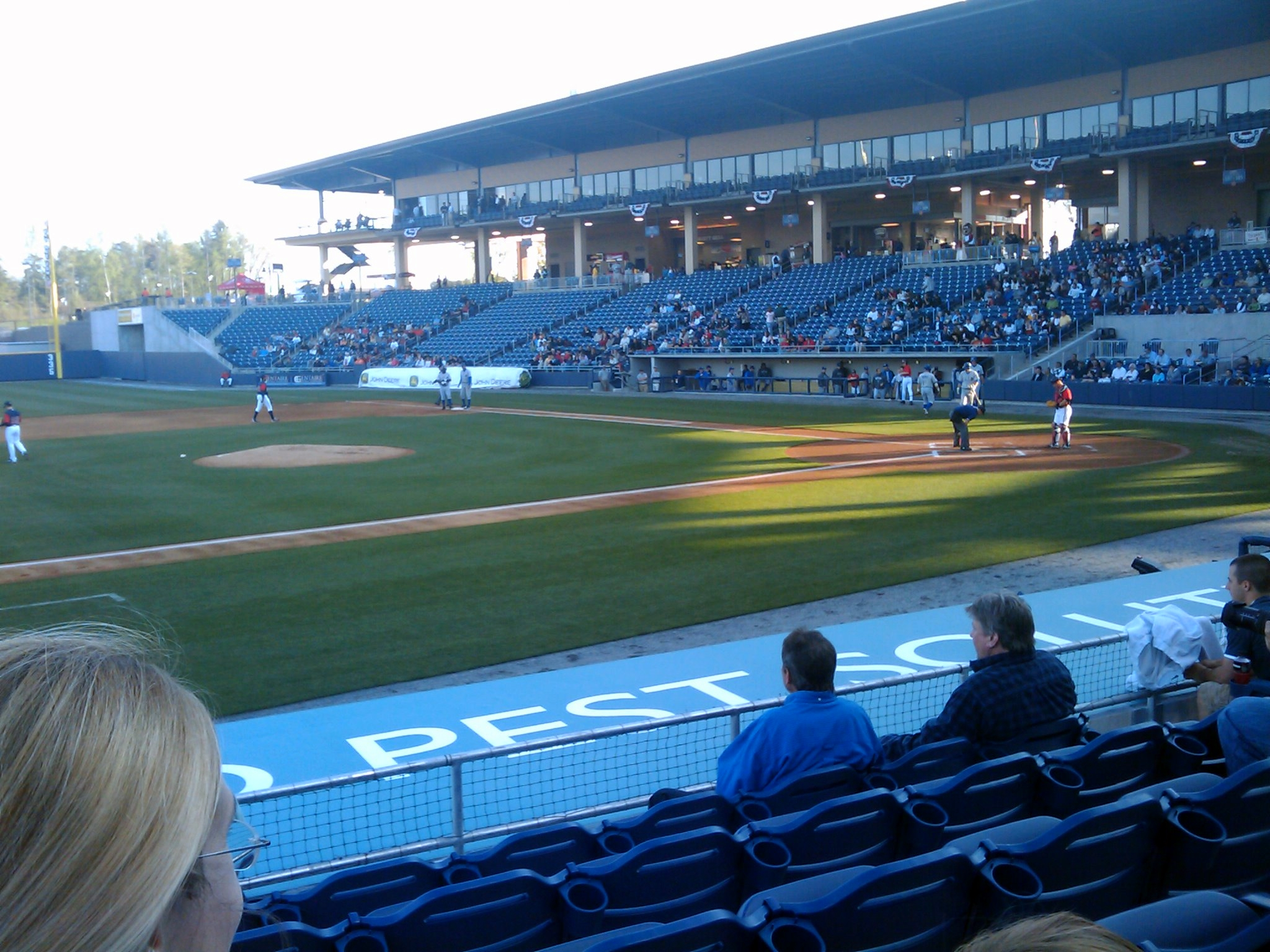
Gwinnett Field (Gwinnett Stripers)

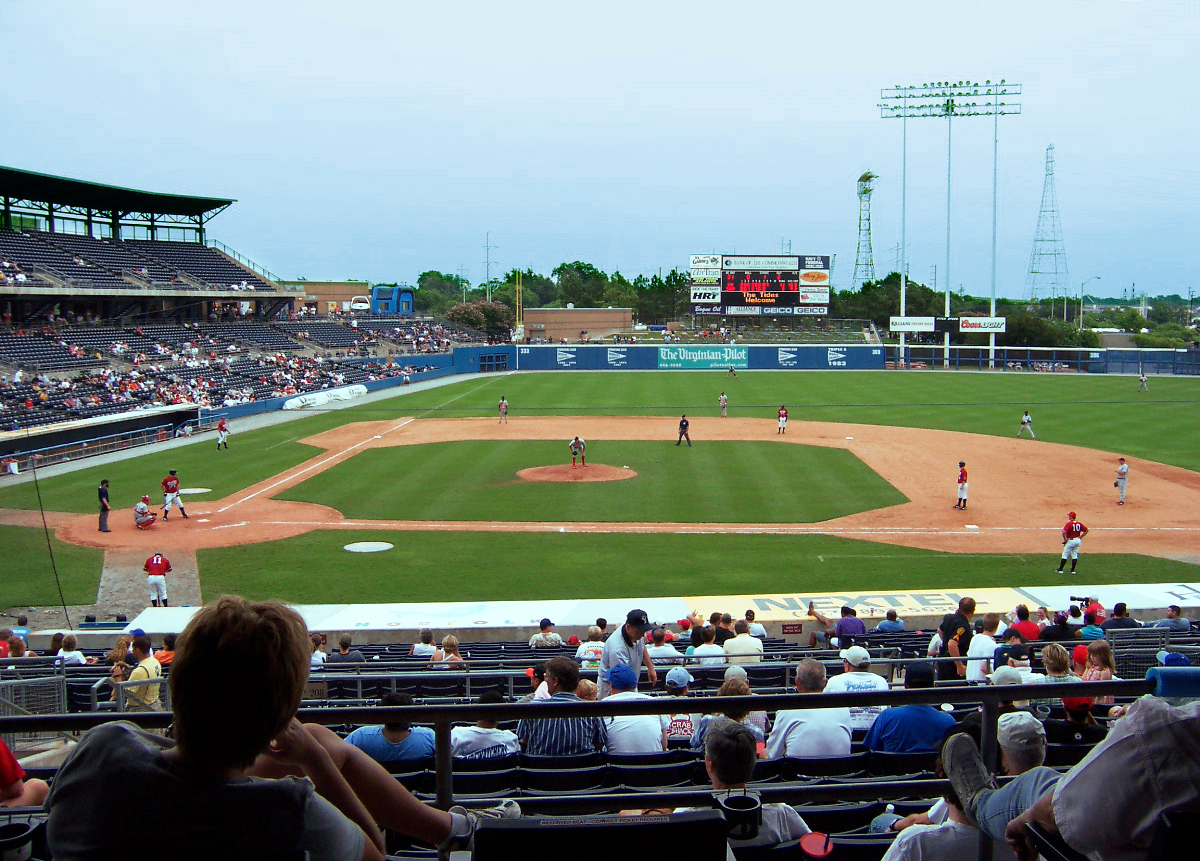
Harbor Park (Norfolk Tides)

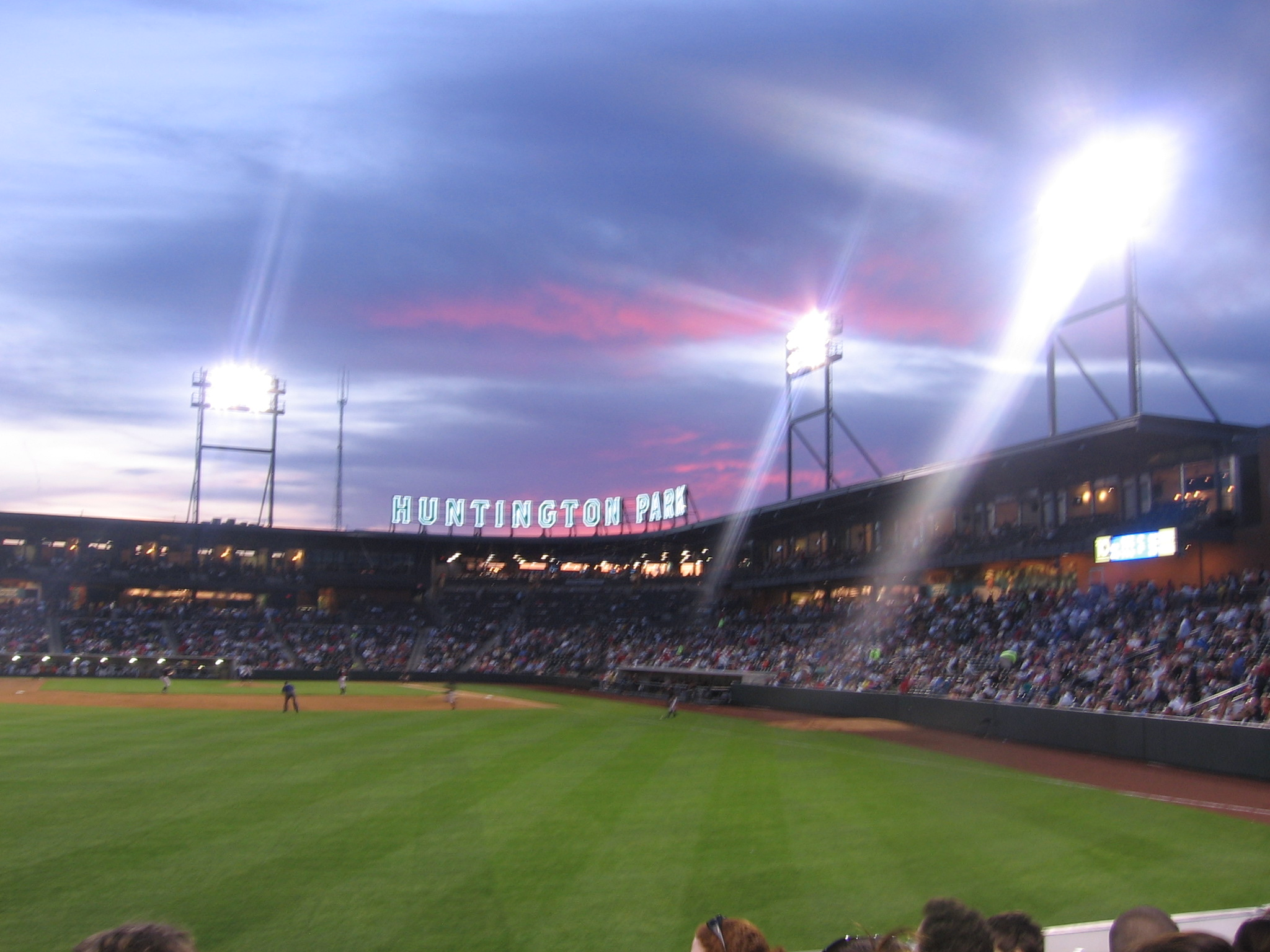
Huntington Park (Columbus Clippers)

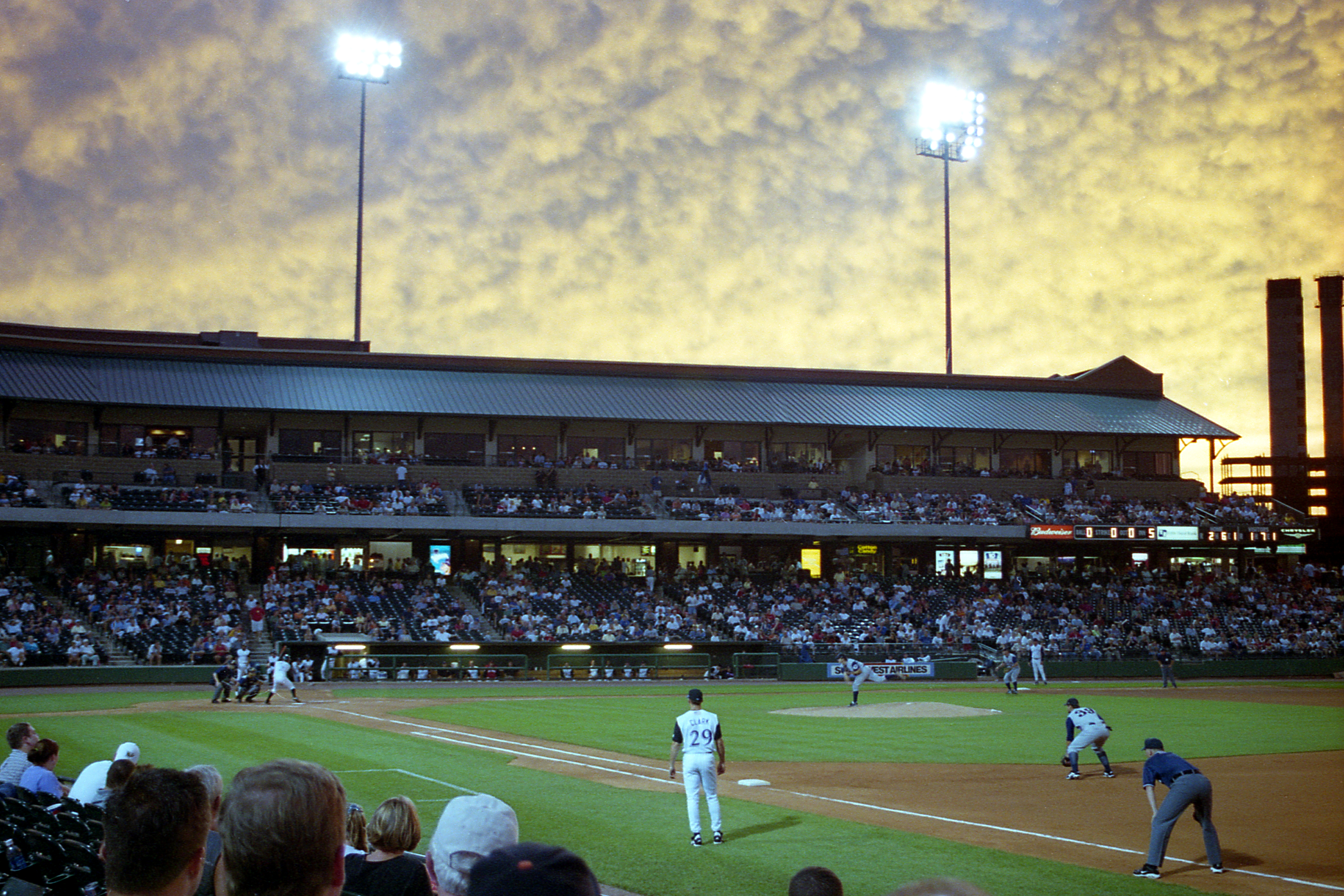
Louisville Slugger Field (Louisville Bats)

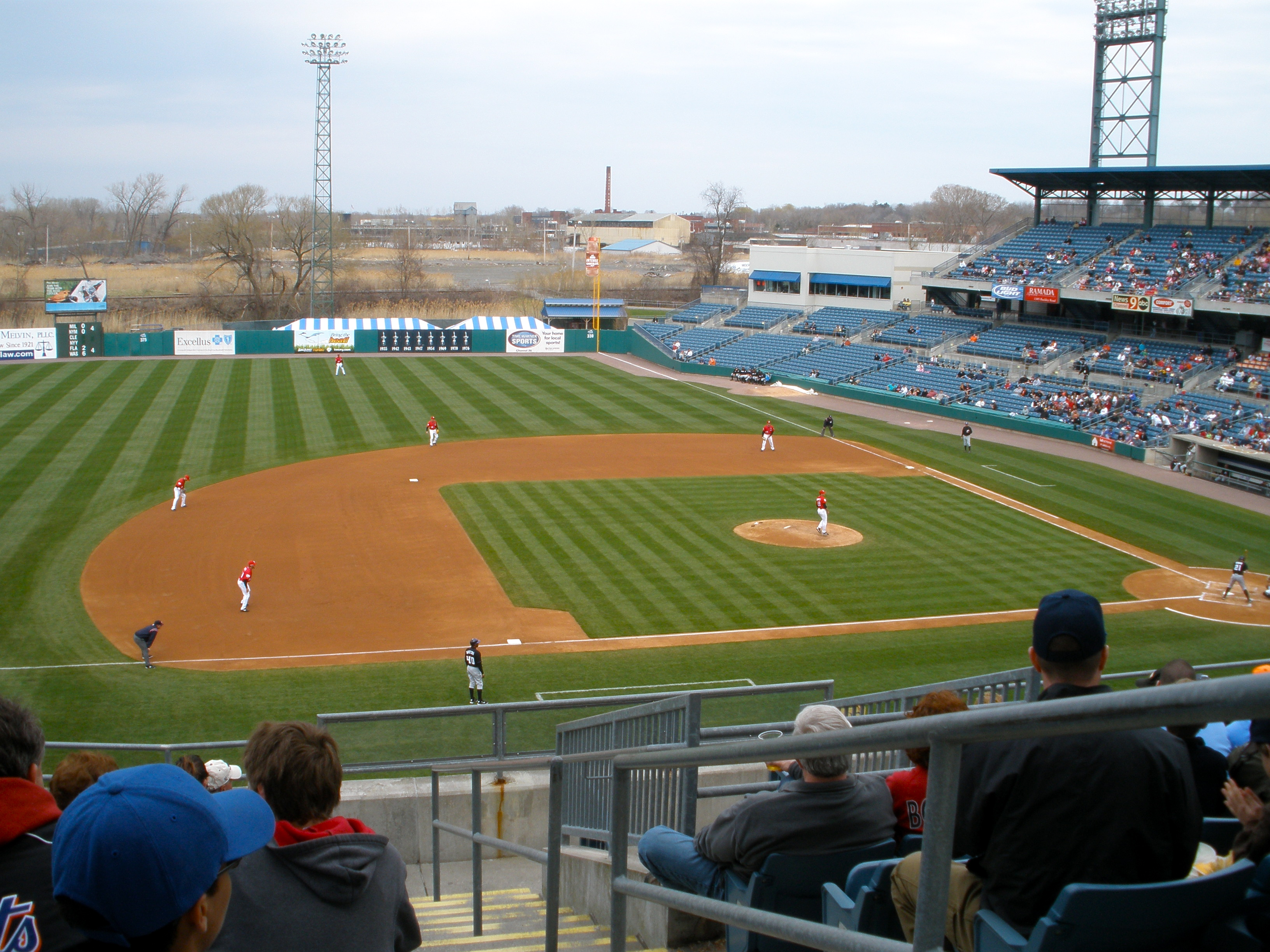
NBT Bank Stadium (Syracuse Mets)

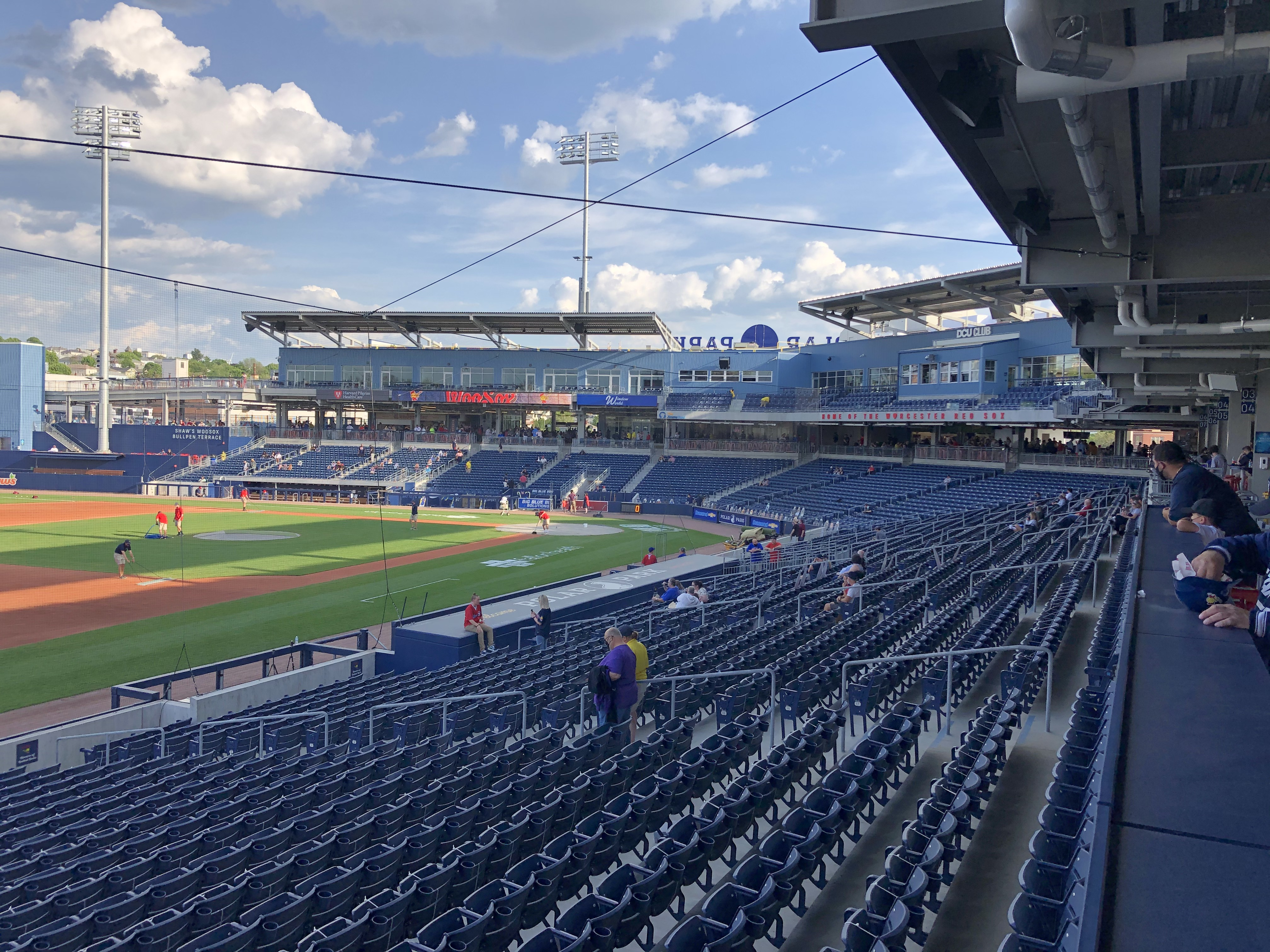
Polar Park (Worcester Red Sox)

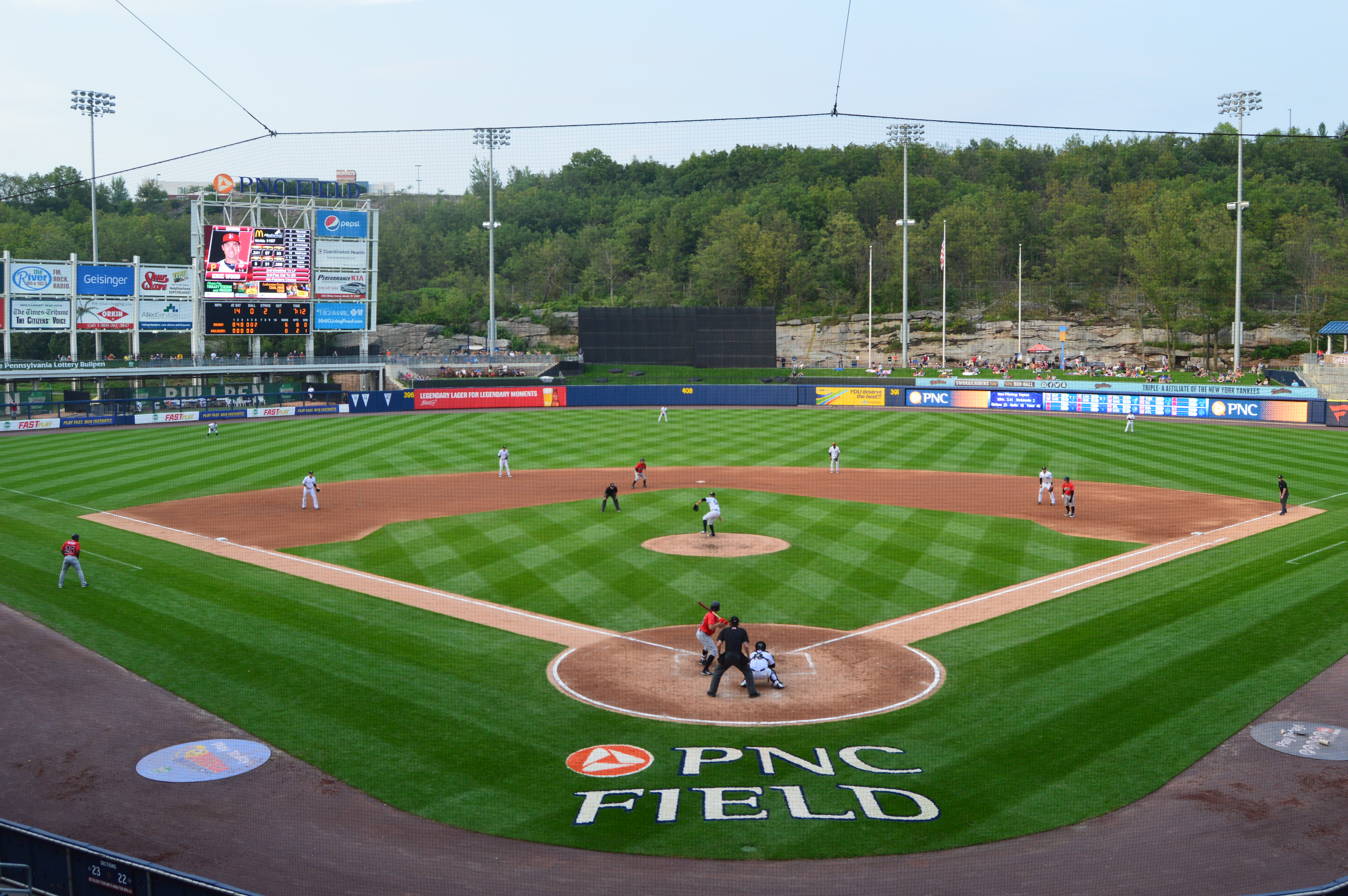
PNC Field (Scranton/Wilkes-Barre Highlanders)

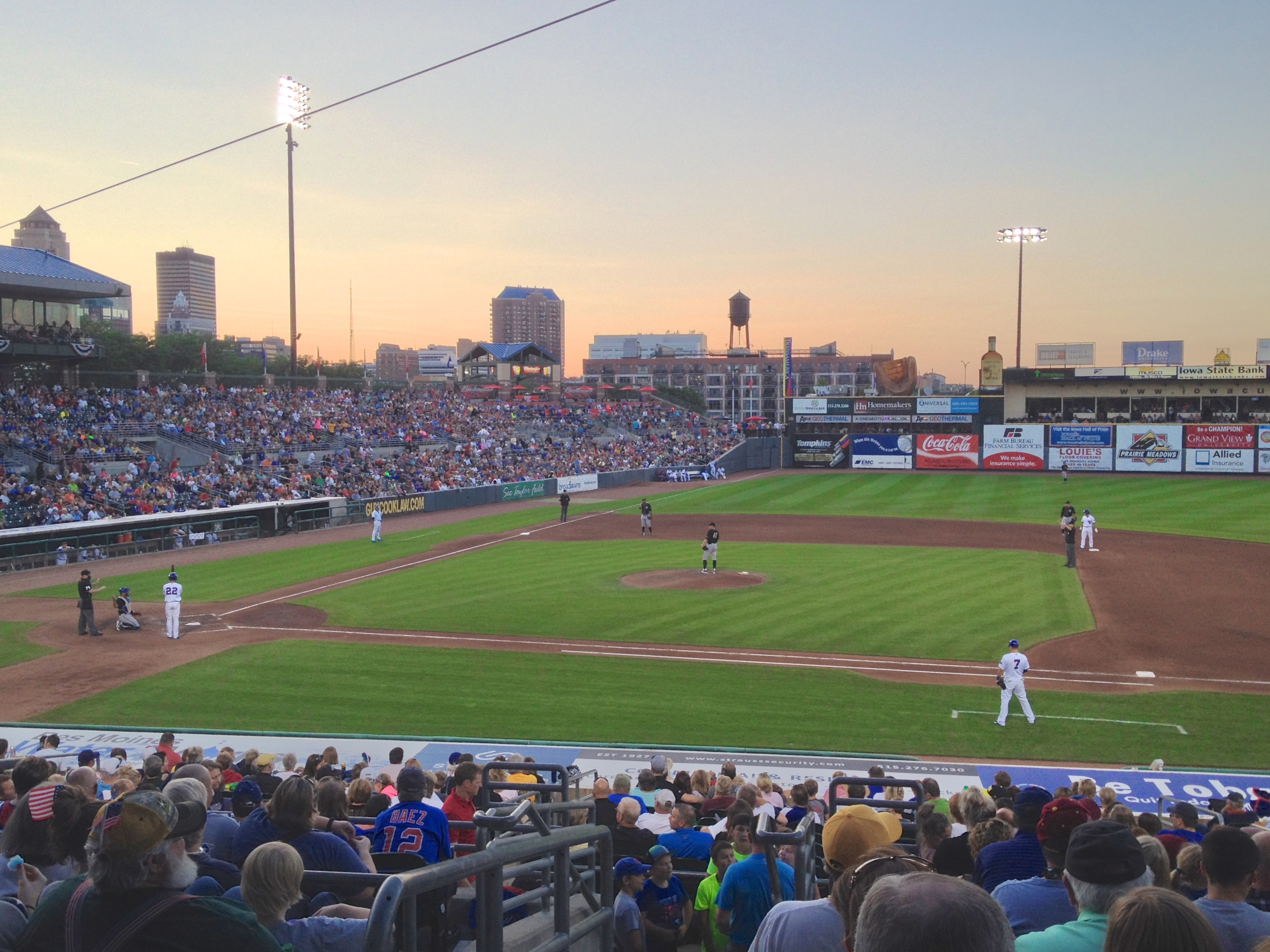
Principal Park (Iowa Cubs)

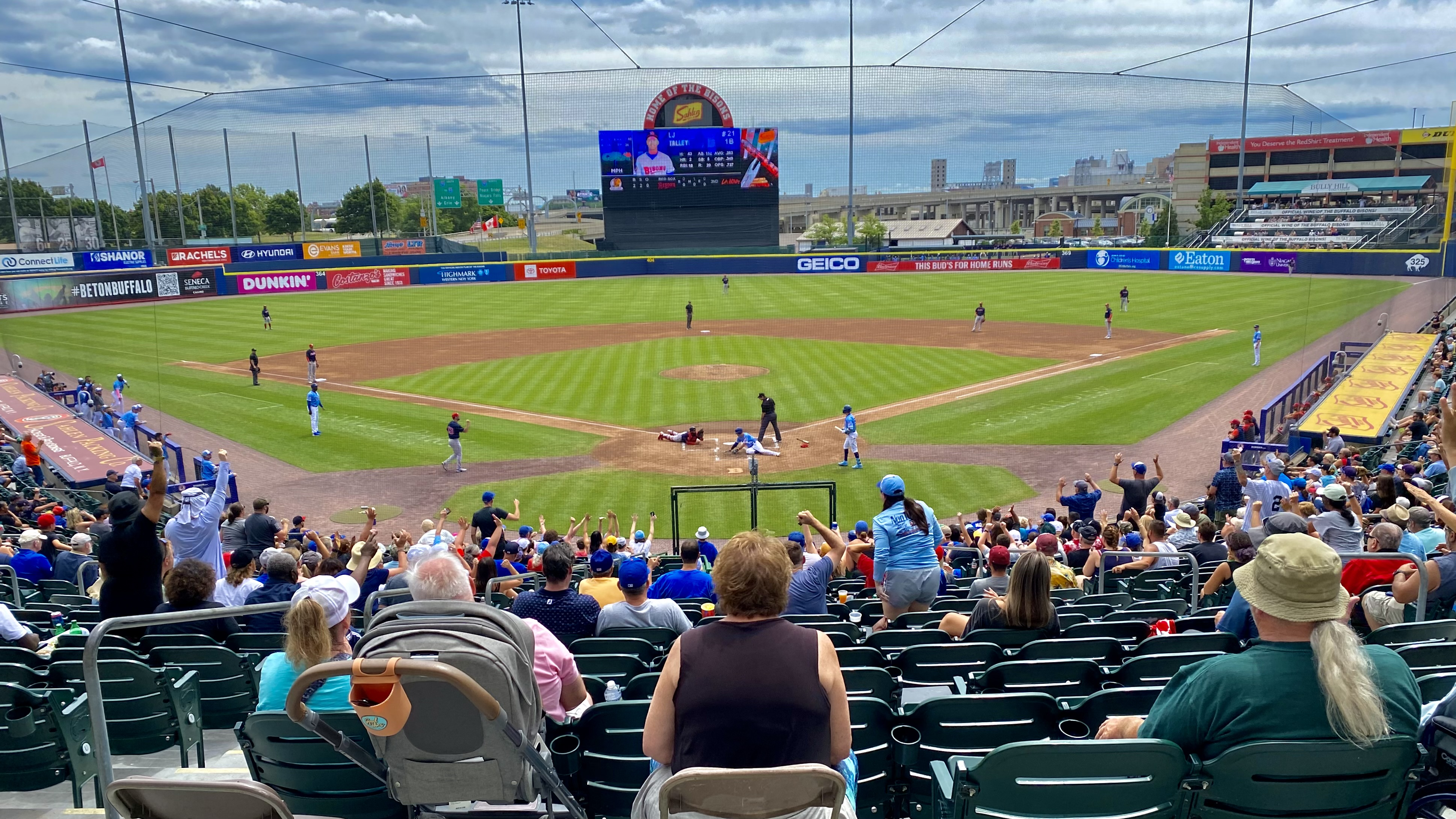
Sahlen Field (Buffalo Bisons)

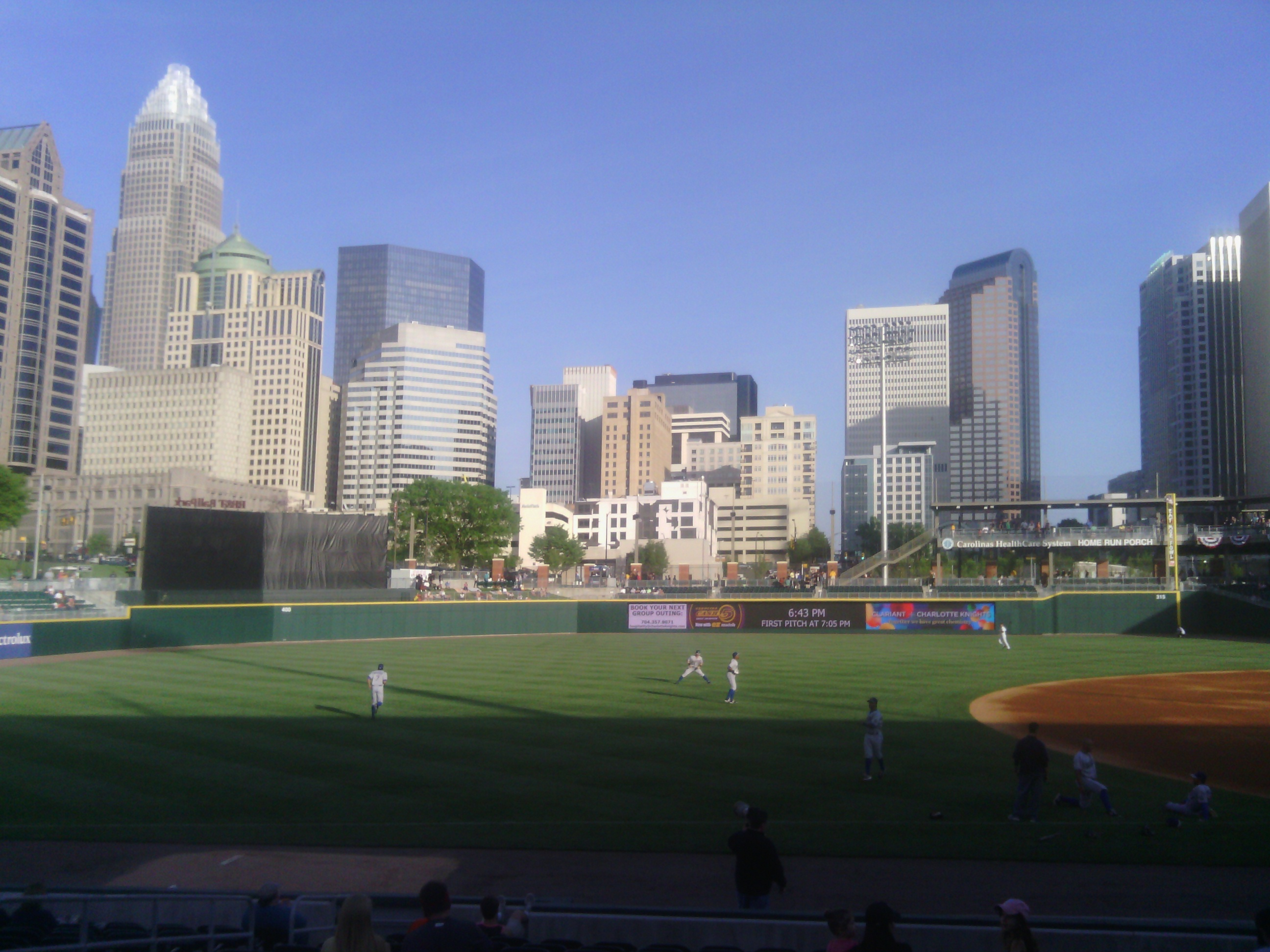
Truist Field (Charlotte Knights)

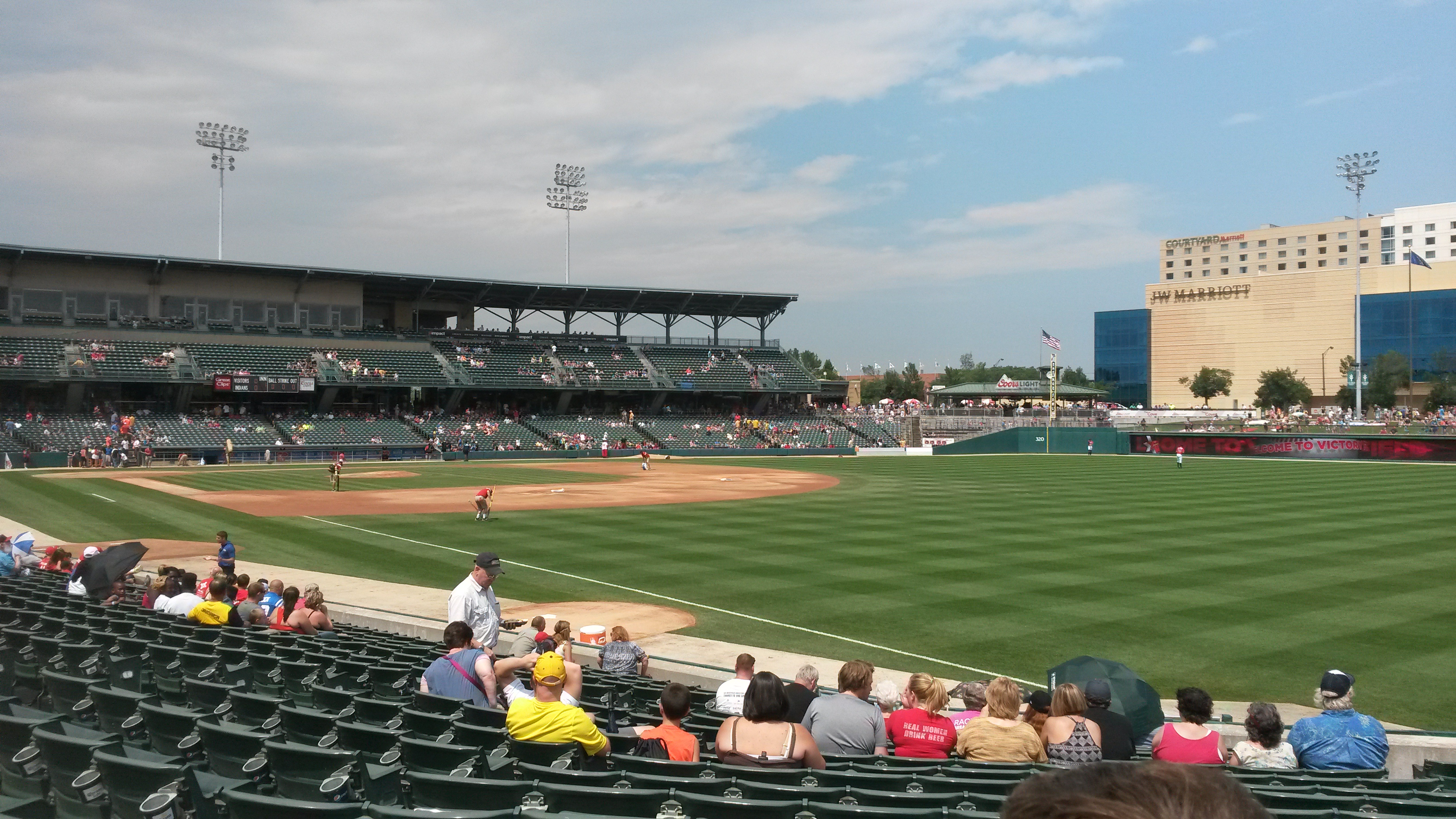
Victory Field (Indianapolis Indians)

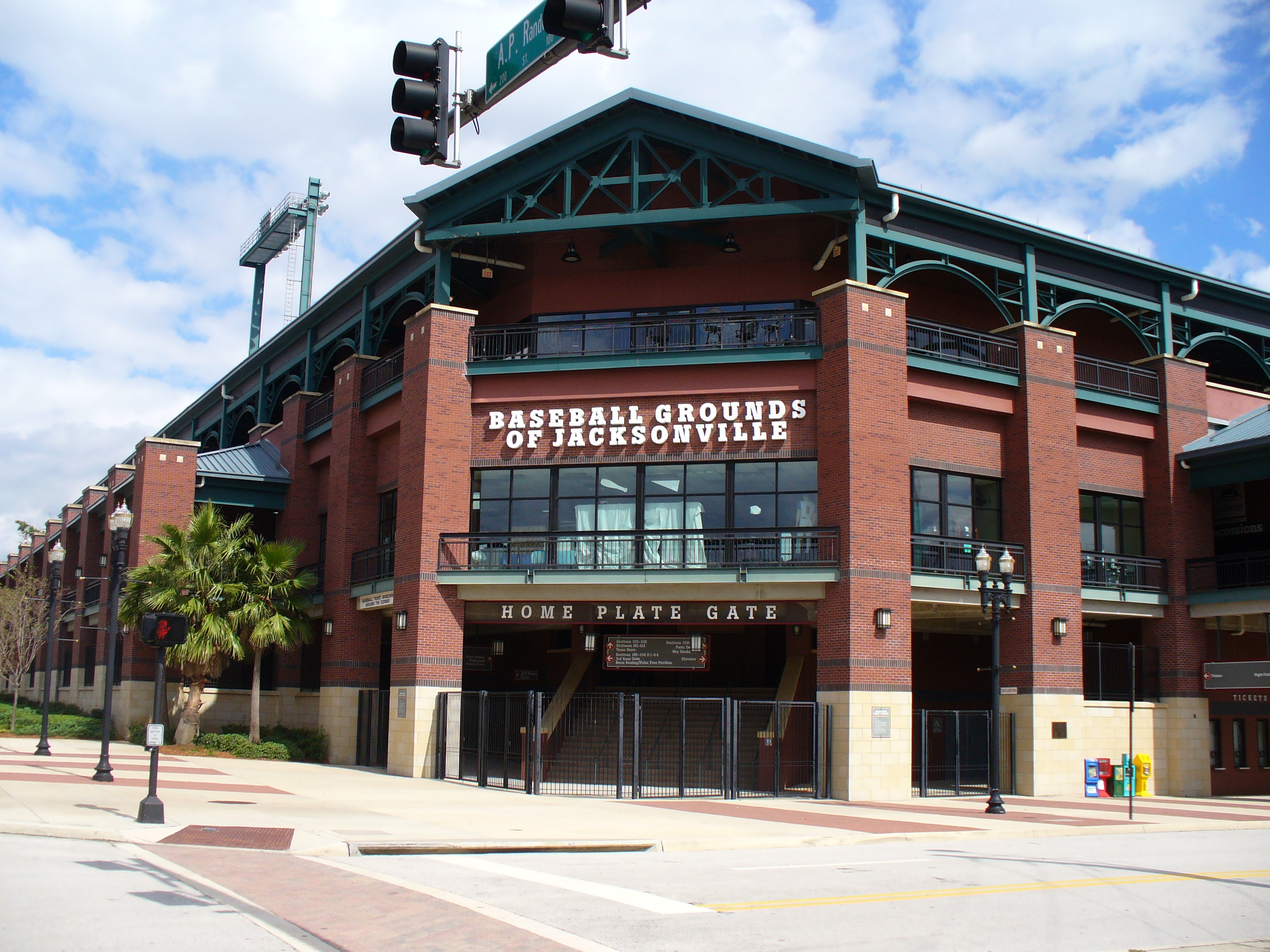
VyStar Ballpark (Jacksonville Jumbo Shrimp)

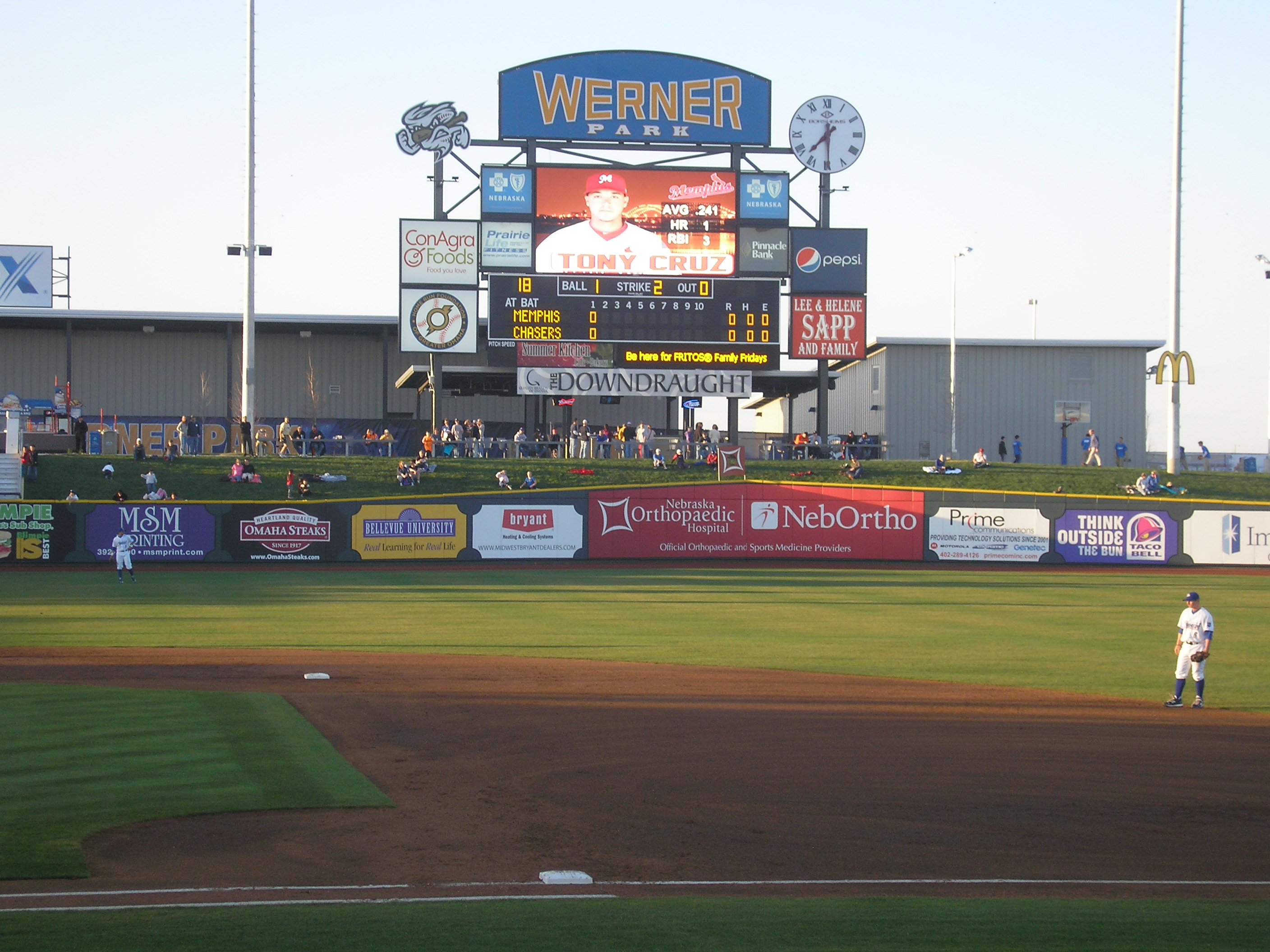
Werner Park (Omaha Storm Chasers)

== All stadiums ==
Key
| Name | Stadium's name in its last season of hosting IL baseball |
| Opened | Opening of earliest stadium variant used for hosting IL baseball |
| Capacity | Stadium's most recent capacity while hosting IL baseball |

| Name | Team(s) | Location | State Province Territory | Opened | Capacity | Ref(s). |
|---|---|---|---|---|---|---|
| Allentown Fairgrounds | Allentown Dukes, Allentown Buffalos | Allentown | Pennsylvania | | | |
| American League Park (Note: American League Park was also known as Oriole Park IV.) | Baltimore Orioles | Baltimore | Maryland | 1901 | 12,000 | |
| Arm & Hammer Park (Note: Arm & Hammer Park was named Mercer County Waterfront Park (1994–2012).) (Note: Arm & Hammer Park's playing surface is named Samuel J. Plumeri, Sr. Field.) | Buffalo Bisons (Note: The Buffalo Bisons played the first four months of the 2021 season at Trenton Thunder Ballpark in Trenton, New Jersey, after being displaced from Buffalo's Sahlen Field by their MLB affiliate, the Toronto Blue Jays, who used the facility due to travel restrictions imposed between the United States and Canada because of the COVID-19 pandemic.) | Trenton | New Jersey | 1994 | 6,440 | |
| Athletic Park | Washington Nationals | Washington, D.C. | N/A | | | |
| Atlanta Stadium | Atlanta Crackers | Atlanta | Georgia | 1965 | 52,710 | |
| Atwater Park (Note: Atwater Park was used for the remainder of the 1897 season after Riverside Park burned on July 10, forcing the Rochester Blackbirds relocate, where they became the Montreal Royals.) | Montreal Royals | Montreal | Quebec | 1897 | | |
| AutoZone Park | Memphis Redbirds | Memphis | Tennessee | 2000 | 10,000 | |
| The Ballpark | Maine Guides/Phillies | Old Orchard Beach | Maine | 1983 | 6,500 | |
| Barnum Grounds | Bridgeport Giants | Bridgeport | Connecticut | | 800 | |
| Base Ball Grounds | Harrisburg Olympics, York White Roses | Harrisburg | Pennsylvania | | | |
| Bay Street Park | Rochester Hustlers/Colts/Tribe/Red Wings, Rochester Bronchos/Hustlers | Rochester | New York | 1908 | 9,500 | |
| Boschen Field | Richmond Virginians | Richmond | Virginia | | | |
| Buffalo Baseball Park (Note: Buffalo Baseball Park was known as New Olympic Park (1899–1907).) | Buffalo Bisons | Buffalo | New York | 1899 | | |
| Bush Stadium (Note: Bush Stadium was also known as Victory Field I and Perry Field.) | Indianapolis Indians | Indianapolis | Indiana | 1931 | 12,934 | |
| Cardinal Stadium (Note: Cardinal Stadium was originally called Fairgrounds Stadium.) | Louisville Colonels, Louisville Redbirds/RiverBats | Louisville | Kentucky | 1956 | 33,500 | |
| CHS Field | St. Paul Saints | Saint Paul | Minnesota | 2015 | 7,210 | |
| Coca-Cola Park | Lehigh Valley IronPigs | Allentown | Pennsylvania | 2008 | 10,100 | |
| Cooper Stadium (Note: Cooper Stadium's previous names were Redbirds Stadium, Jets Stadium, and Franklin County Stadium.) | Columbus Clippers, Columbus Jets, Columbus Red Birds | Columbus | Ohio | 1932 | 15,000 | |
| Culver Field | Rochester Maroons, Rochester Jingoes/Hopbitters, Rochester Patriots, Rochester Bronchos | Rochester | New York | | | |
| Decasse Park | Ottawa Giants, Ottawa Athletics | Ottawa | Ontario | | | |
| Delorimier Stadium (Note: Delorimier Stadium was temporarily renamed Hector Racine Stadium.) | Montreal Royals | Montreal | Quebec | 1928 | 20,000 | |
| The Diamond | Richmond Braves | Richmond | Virginia | 1985 | 12,000 | |
| Diamond Park | Toronto Maple Leafs | Toronto | Ontario | 1901 | 5,200 | |
| Durham Bulls Athletic Park | Durham Bulls | Durham | North Carolina | 1995 | 10,000 | |
| East State Street Grounds | Trenton Trentonians | Trenton | New Jersey | | 3,000 | |
| ESL Ballpark (Note: ESL Ballpark was formerly known as Frontier Field (1997–2022) and Innovative Field (2022–2025).) | Rochester Red Wings | Rochester | New York | 1997 | 10,840 | |
| Emmett Street Grounds | Newark Domestics, Newark Little Giants | Newark | New Jersey | | | |
| Estadio Sixto Escobar | San Juan Marlins | San Juan | Puerto Rico | 1935 | 9,000 | |
| Fifth Third Field | Toledo Mud Hens | Toledo | Ohio | 2002 | 10,300 | |
| First Horizon Park (Note: First Horizon Park was formerly known as First Tennessee Park.) | Nashville Sounds | Nashville | Tennessee | 2015 | 10,000 | |
| Forepaugh Park | Philadelphia Athletics | Philadelphia | Pennsylvania | | 5,000 | |
| Frank D. Lawrence Stadium (Note: Frank D. Lawrence Stadium was initially named Portsmouth Stadium.) | Tidewater Tides | Portsmouth | Virginia | 1941 | 11,000 | |
| Gran Stadium de la Habana (Note: Gran Stadium de la Habana was renamed Estadio Latinoamericano in 1971.) | Havana Sugar Kings | Havana | La Habana | 1946 | 32,000 | |
| Gwinnett Field (Note: Gwinnett Field was formerly known as Coolray Field.) | Gwinnett Braves/Stripers | Lawrenceville | Georgia | 2009 | 10,427 | |
| Hamilton Athletic Association Grounds | Hamilton Tigers | Hamilton | Ontario | | 4,000 | |
| Hanlan's Point Stadium | Toronto Maple Leafs | Toronto | Ontario | 1908 | 17,000 | |
| Harbor Park | Norfolk Tides | Norfolk | Virginia | 1993 | 11,856 | |
| Hartford Park | Hartford Indians/Wooden Nutmegs | Hartford | Connecticut | | 6,000 | |
| Hawkins Stadium | Albany Senators | Albany | New York | 1928 | 9,100 | |
| Howard Avenue Grounds | New Haven, New Haven Nutmegs | New Haven | Connecticut | | | |
| Huntington Park | Columbus Clippers | Columbus | Ohio | 2009 | 10,100 | |
| Island Park (Note: Island Park was also known as Riverside Park.) | Harrisburg Senators | Harrisburg | Pennsylvania | 1902 | 5,000 | |
| Johnson Field | Binghamton Bingos | Binghamton | New York | | 3,400 | |
| Knights Stadium | Charlotte Knights | Fort Mill | South Carolina | 1990 | 10,000 | |
| Labatt Park (Note: Labatt Park was known as Tecumseh Park (1888–1924) and Queens Park (1925–1930).) | London Tecumsehs | London | Ontario | 1877 | 4,800 | |
| Lansdowne Park | Ottawa Giants, Ottawa Athletics, Ottawa Wanderers | Ottawa | Ontario | 1909 | 24,000 | |
| Lauer Park | Reading Coal Barons/Marines/Aces/Keystones | Reading | Pennsylvania | | 6,000 | |
| Laurel Hill Base Ball Park | Scranton Indians/Miners/Coal Heavers | Scranton | Pennsylvania | | | |
| League Park I | Akron Buckeyes | Akron | Ohio | 1906 | 5,000 | |
| Lee Park (Note: Lee Park was also known as Boulevard Field.) | Richmond Virginians | Richmond | Virginia | 1912 | 7,000 | |
| Louisville Slugger Field | Louisville RiverBats/Bats | Louisville | Kentucky | 2000 | 13,131 | |
| Lynx Stadium | Ottawa Lynx | Ottawa | Ontario | 1993 | 10,332 | |
| MacArthur Stadium | Syracuse Chiefs | Syracuse | New York | 1934 | 10,500 | |
| Maple Avenue Driving Park | Elmira Colonels | Elmira | New York | | | |
| Maple Leaf Stadium | Toronto Maple Leafs | Toronto | Ontario | 1926 | 23,500 | |
| McCoy Stadium | Pawtucket/Rhode Island Red Sox | Pawtucket | Rhode Island | 1942 | 10,031 | |
| Melrose Park | Providence Grays | Providence | Rhode Island | | 7,500 | |
| Memorial Stadium | Baltimore Orioles | Baltimore | Maryland | 1950 | 31,000 | |
| Meriden Ball Park | Meriden Maroons | Meriden | Connecticut | 1885 | | |
| Messer Street Grounds | Providence Clamdiggers | Providence | Rhode Island | 1878 | 3,000 | |
| Metropolitan Memorial Park | Tidewater Tides | Norfolk | Virginia | 1970 | 6,200 | |
| Miami Stadium | Miami Marlins | Miami | Florida | 1949 | 13,500 | |
| Monumental Park | Baltimore Monumentals | Baltimore | Maryland | 1884 | 1,500 | |
| Municipal Stadium (Note: Municipal Stadium was formerly known as Venable Stadium (1944–1949) and Babe Ruth Stadium (1949–1950).) | Baltimore Orioles | Baltimore | Maryland | 1922 | 55,000 | |
| NBT Bank Stadium (Note: NBT Bank Stadium was previously known as P&C Field and Alliance Bank Stadium.) | Syracuse SkyChiefs/Chiefs/Mets | Syracuse | New York | 1997 | 10,815 | |
| Ned Skeldon Stadium | Toledo Mud Hens | Toledo | Ohio | 1965 | 10,025 | |
| New Broad Street Park | Richmond Climbers | Richmond | Virginia | 1897 | 6,000 | |
| Oakdale Park | Jersey City Skeeters | Jersey City | New Jersey | | | |
| Offermann Stadium (Note: Offermann Stadium was called Bison Stadium before being renamed in 1935.) | Buffalo Bisons | Buffalo | New York | 1924 | 14,000 | |
| Olympic Park | Buffalo Bisons | Buffalo | New York | 1884 | 5,000 | |
| The Oval | Worcester Farmers/Quakers/Hustlers/Riddlers | Worcester | Massachusetts | 1892 | 2,000 | |
| Parker Field | Richmond Virginians, Richmond Braves | Richmond | Virginia | 1934 | 9,500 | |
| Penryn Park | Lebanon Cedars | Lebanon | Pennsylvania | 1889 | | |
| PNC Field (Note: PNC Field was formerly known as Lackawanna County Stadium.) | Scranton/Wilkes-Barre Red Barons/Yankees/RailRiders/Highlanders | Moosic | Pennsylvania | 1989 | 10,000 | |
| Polar Park | Worcester Red Sox | Worcester | Massachusetts | 2021 | 9,508 | |
| Ponce de Leon Park (Note: Original Ponce de Leon Park was destroyed by fire, rebuilt, and named Spiller Park (1924–1931).) | Atlanta Crackers | Atlanta | Georgia | 1924 | 12,500 | |
| Principal Park | Iowa Cubs | Des Moines | Iowa | 1992 | 11,500 | |
| Pynchon Park (Note: First two stadiums on the site of Pynchon Park were known as Hampden Park (1853–1908) and Hampden Park II (1908–1937).) | Springfield, Springfield Cubs, Springfield Ponies/Maroons | Springfield | Massachusetts | 1853 | 4,500 | |
| Recreation Park | Detroit Wolverines | Detroit | Michigan | 1879 | 7,500 | |
| Recreation Park | Rochester Patriots, Rochester Bronchos | Rochester | New York | | | |
| Recreation Park I | Elmira Gladiators | Elmira | New York | | | |
| Red Crescent Park | Providence Clamdiggers/Grays | Providence | Rhode Island | | | |
| Richardson Park | Oswego Sweegs/Starchboxes | Oswego | New York | | | |
| Riverside Grounds | Utica Pent-Ups, Syracuse–Utica Stars | Utica | New York | | 1,200 | |
| Riverside Park | Albany Governors, Albany Senators | Albany | New York | | 3,000 | |
| Riverside Park | Binghamton Bingos | Binghamton | New York | | | |
| Riverside Park (Note: Riverside Park burned on July 10, 1897, causing the Rochester Blackbirds to finish the season at Atwater Park as the Montreal Royals.) | Rochester Browns/Blackbirds | Rochester | New York | | | |
| Roosevelt Stadium | Jersey City Giants, Jersey City Jerseys | Jersey City | New Jersey | 1923 | 23,000 | |
| Ruppert Stadium (Note: Ruppert Stadium was also known as Davids Stadium and Bear Stadium, and was built around the same footprint as Wiedemayer Park.) | Newark Bears | Newark | New Jersey | 1926 | 12,000 | |
| Sahlen Field (Note: Sahlen Field was formerly known as Pilot Field (1988–1995), NorthAmeriCare Park (1996–1999), Dunn Tire Park (2000–2006), and Coca-Cola Field.) | Buffalo Bisons | Buffalo | New York | 1988 | 16,600 | |
| Sam W. Wolfson Park (Note: Sam W. Wolfson Park was originally named Jacksonville Baseball Park (1955–1964).) | Jacksonville Suns | Jacksonville | Florida | 1955 | 8,200 | |
| Sandy Creek Grounds | Oswego Sweegs | Oswego | New York | | | |
| Silver Stadium (Note: Silver Stadium was originally called Red Wing Stadium (1929–1968).) | Rochester Red Wings | Rochester | New York | 1928 | 11,502 | |
| Skeeters Park (Note: Skeeters Park was also called West Side Park.) | Jersey City Skeeters/Colts | Jersey City | New Jersey | 1902 | 8,500 | |
| Speranza Park | Toledo White Stockings/Black Pirates | Toledo | Ohio | | | |
| Star Park (Note: This Star Park was also known as Old Star Park.) | Syracuse Stars, Syracuse–Utica Stars | Syracuse | New York | 1885 | 5,000 | |
| Star Park | Syracuse Stars | Syracuse | New York | | 5,500 | |
| Sunlight Park | Toronto Canucks/Maple Leafs | Toronto | Ontario | | 2,000 | |
| Terrapin Park (Note: Terrapin Park was also known as Oriole Park V.) | Baltimore Orioles | Baltimore | Maryland | 1914 | 16,000 | |
| Tim McCarver Stadium (Note: Tim McCarver Stadium was also known as Blues Stadium.) | Memphis Blues | Memphis | Tennessee | 1963 | 5,447 | |
| Traveler Field (Note: Traveler Field was renamed Ray Winder Field in 1966.) | Arkansas Travelers | North Little Rock | Arkansas | 1931 | 6,083 | |
| Treasure Island (Note: Treasure Island was also known as Pleasure Island.) | Troy Trojans/Washer Women | Troy | New York | | | |
| Truist Field (Note: Truist Field was formerly known as BB&T Ballpark.) | Charlotte Knights | Charlotte | North Carolina | 2014 | 10,200 | |
| Union Assn. Park | Wilmington Quicksteps/Blue Hens | Wilmington | Delaware | | 3,000 | |
| Union Park Grounds | Saginaw–Bay City Hyphens | Saginaw | Michigan | | | |
| Union Street Grounds (Note: Union Street Grounds was also known as Hop Bitters Grounds.) | Rochester Flour Cities | Rochester | New York | | 1,500 | |
| Victory Field | Indianapolis Indians | Indianapolis | Indiana | 1996 | 13,750 | |
| Virginia Baseball Park | Richmond Virginians | Richmond | Virginia | | 1,000 | |
| VyStar Ballpark (Note: VyStar Ballpark was also known as the Baseball Grounds of Jacksonville.) | Jacksonville Jumbo Shrimp | Jacksonville | Florida | 2003 | 11,000 | |
| War Memorial Stadium (Note: War Memorial Stadium was also known as The Rockpile.) | Buffalo Bisons | Buffalo | New York | 1937 | 46,000 | |
| War Memorial Stadium | Peninsula Whips | Hampton | Virginia | 1948 | 3,750 | |
| Washington Park I | Brooklyn Atlantics | Brooklyn | New York | | 3,000 | |
| Watt Powell Park (Note: Watt Powell Park was also known as Exhibition Park.) | Charleston Marlins, Charleston Charlies | Charleston | West Virginia | 1948 | 5,500 | |
| Wenona Park | Saginaw–Bay City Hyphens | Bay City | Michigan | | | |
| Werner Park | Omaha Storm Chasers | Papillon | Nebraska | 2011 | 9,023 | |
| Wiedenmayer Park | Newark Sailors/Indians, Newark Bears | Newark | New Jersey | | 19,000 | |
| Winnipeg Stadium | Winnipeg Whips | Winnipeg | Manitoba | 1953 | 6,096 | |

=== Maps ===
International League stadium location in Manitoba, Canada
International League stadium US and Canada locations
International League stadium Caribbean locations

== See also ==
- List of International League teams
- List of American Association (1902–1997) stadiums
- List of Pacific Coast League stadiums
- List of Triple-A baseball stadiums
