= Washington Park (Indianapolis) =

Two different minor league baseball parks in Indianapolis, Indiana

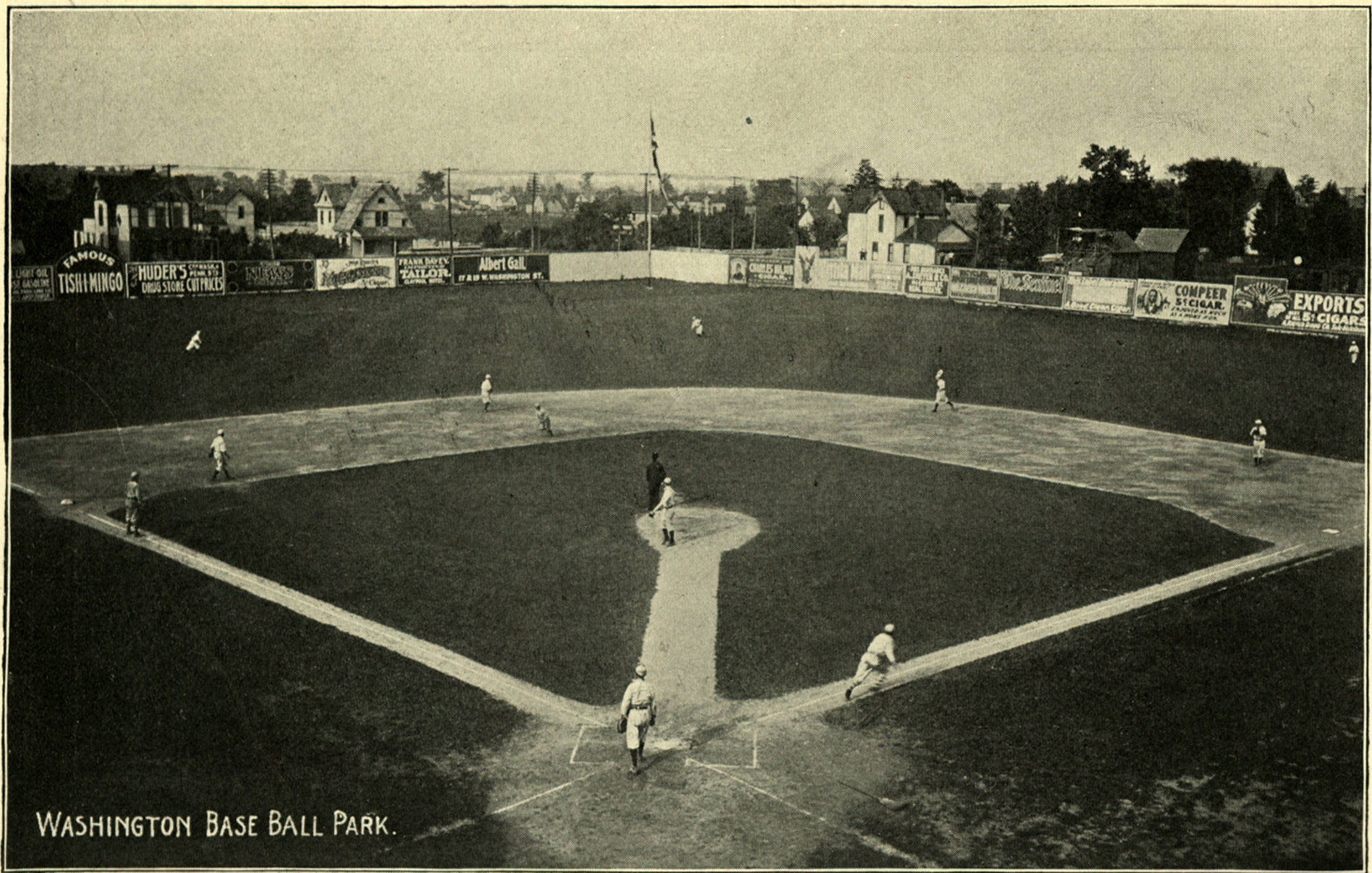
Washington Park (I) in 1904.

Washington Park (formally Washington Baseball Park) was the name of two different minor league baseball parks in Indianapolis, Indiana, in the early twentieth century. They were used primarily by the Indianapolis Indians before that club moved to Perry Stadium in 1931.

== First Washington Park ==
Washington Park (I) in March 1900, nearly completed

The first Washington Park was at 3001 East Washington Street where it meets Gray Street (39°46′6″N 86°6′48″W). That ballpark was built in 1900 in the southwest corner of that intersection. Initially it was the home of the Indianapolis entry in the then-minor American League. A photo of "Washington Park, the new ball grounds" in the Indianapolis News on March 27, 1900, reveals an all-wood, temporary-looking structure. The papers had reported that the wood from the previous ballpark had been transported to the new site to rebuild the stands, not an unusual practice in those days. In 1902 the American Association's Indianapolis Indians moved into this facility and stayed there for three seasons.

Newspaper reports indicate that the diamond was in the southwest corner of the field. There was a grandstand and "west" and "south" bleachers, with the west section being behind third base.

The inaugural league game was played on April 20, 1900, with Cleveland defeating Indianapolis 7–6.

The ballpark was used for football during the baseball off-season, by local teams including Butler. High school teams also used the field, and a local high school matchup on Thanksgiving Day 1904 would prove to be the final event there. A few days later, demolition of the ballpark began, with some of the lumber planned to be used at the new Washington Park.

The property was redeveloped into Wonderland Amusement Park.

== Second Washington Park ==
Washington Park (II) in March 1905, nearly completed

The second home of the Indianapolis Indians, from 1905 to 1931, is now referred to as the West Washington Street Park, but at the time was known as either Washington Park or Washington Baseball Grounds. The park was located at 1235 West Washington Street, just west of the White River (39°46′1″N 86°10′54″W). Like its predecessor at Washington and Gray, this was a very rudimentary baseball venue with an all-wooden grandstand and a capacity of just over 4,000. In 1909 the park was completely rebuilt, and the seating capacity was enlarged to 20,000, the most in the minor leagues, due mainly to the addition of extensive bleacher sections. It also boasted the largest playing field of any minor league park, and was larger than many major league parks of the era. Aside from hosting the American Association's Indians, this venue was home to the Indianapolis ABCs of the Negro National League from 1920 to 1926. The second ballpark also served as the home field for the 1911 Butler Christians football team.

Washington Park II in 1915

The last game at Washington Park (II) came on August 19, 1931. Even before the new Perry Stadium was opened in early September, the old ballpark was being dismantled. Part of that process including moving the light towers to the new ballpark, to be ready for use by 1932.

The land occupied by the second incarnation of the ballpark, as well as the route of Washington Street itself, was substantially changed in the 1980s when the Indianapolis Zoo was built. Portions of the zoo now cover the site, and a marker was placed on July 22, 2011.

== Dimensions ==
Local newspapers, reporting on a comparison of the old and new parks, stated that the foul line distances at Washington Park (II) were 349 feet (106 m) to left and 342 feet (104 m) to right. The new Perry Stadium was slightly larger, at 350 feet (110 m) to both left and right.

== See also ==
- List of baseball parks in Indianapolis

== Sources ==
- Ballparks of North America, Michael Benson, McFarland, 1989, p. 209
