= Farrand =

Farrand may refer to:

- William R. Farrand (1853–1930), American manufacturer of pianos and organs
- Livingston Farrand (1867–1939), American physician and anthropologist
- Royal T. Farrand (1867–1927), American football player and medical doctor
- Max Farrand (1869–1945), American historian
- Beatrix Farrand (1872–1959), American landscape gardener and architect
- John Farrand (born 1945), British-American business executive
- Phil Farrand (born 1958), American computer programmer

== See also ==
- Farrands
