= 1887 Notre Dame football team =

American college football season

1887 Notre Dame football
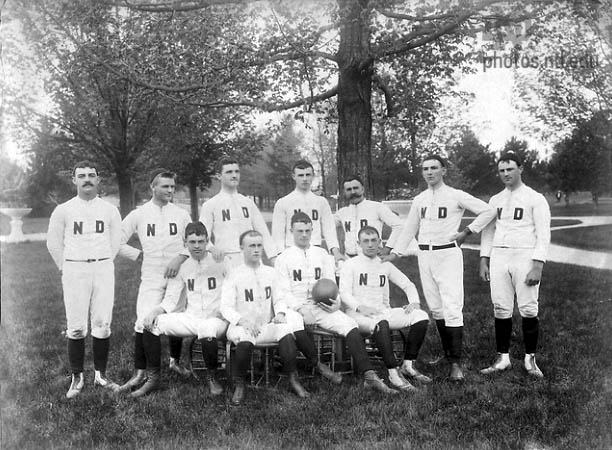
- Conference: Independent
- Record: 0–3
- Head coach: None
- Captain: Henry Luhn

1887 Midwestern college football independents records
	Conf.			Overall
Team	W	L	T	W		L		T
Michigan		–		5	–	0	–	0
Minnesota		–		2	–	0	–	0
Cincinnati		–		1	–	0	–	0
Washington University		–		1	–	0	–	0
Butler		–		2	–	1	–	0
Indiana		–		0	–	1	–	0
Purdue		–		0	–	1	–	0
Wabash		–		0	–	1	–	0
Notre Dame		–		0	–	3	–	0
Albion		–		0	–	1	–	0

The 1887 Notre Dame football team represented the University of Notre Dame during the 1887 college football season.

== Schedule ==
Date	Opponent	Site	Result	Attendance	Source
November 23	Michigan	Notre Dame, IN (rivalry)	L 0–8	400–500	
April 20, 1888	Michigan	Green Stocking Ball Park; Notre Dame, IN	L 6–26	300–800	
April 21, 1888	Michigan	Notre Dame, IN	L 4–10		

== Season overview ==
=== Notre Dame's first official rugby football game ===
The first Notre Dame football game took place on November 23, 1887, on the school's campus just north of South Bend, Indiana. Michigan had been playing football since May 30, 1879. Two players on Michigan's 1887 team, George Winthrop DeHaven Jr. and William Warren Harless, had previously attended Notre Dame. In October 1887, DeHaven wrote to Brother Paul, who ran Notre Dame's intramural athletics program, telling him about the new game of football. Michigan had planned a game in Chicago on Thanksgiving Day, and the three men, DeHaven, Harless and Brother Paul, persuaded their respective schools to play a football match on the Notre Dame campus on the day before Thanksgiving.

On November 22, 1887, the Michigan football team departed from the Michigan Central Railroad Depot in Ann Arbor on the late train. After breakfast in Niles, Michigan, the team changed trains and arrived in South Bend between 7:00 a.m. and 8:00 a.m. The team was greeted by Father Superior Walsh and spent two hours touring the university buildings and departments of Notre Dame.

The game was the first played by a Notre Dame football team, and the Michigan team was credited with teaching the Notre Dame team the game before play began. The Notre Dame student newspaper, Scholastic, reported: "It was not considered a match contest, as the home team had been organized only a few weeks, and the Michigan boys, the champions of the West, came more to instruct them in the points of the Rugby game than to win fresh laurels." The proceedings began with a tutorial session in which players from both teams were divided irrespective of college. For the first 30 minutes, the teams scrimmaged in a practice game with Michigan "exchanging six men for the same number from Notre Dame."

After the practice session, the Michigan and Notre Dame teams played a game that lasted only half an hour which was described by The Chronicle (a University of Michigan newspaper) as follows: "The grounds were in very poor condition for playing, being covered with snow in a melting condition, and the players could scarcely keep their feet. Some time had been spent in preliminary practice; the game began and after rolling and tumbling in the mud for half an hour time was finally called, the score standing 8 to 0 in favor of U. of M."

Between 400 and 500 students watched the game. After the game, the Michigan team ate at the Notre Dame dining hall. The Notre Dame student newspaper reported on the gratitude of Notre Dame officials for Michigan's tutorial in the game of football: "After a hearty dinner, Rev. President Walsh thanked the Ann Arbor team for their visit, and assured them of the cordial reception that would always await them at Notre Dame." Brother Paul arranged for carriages to take the team to Niles in time to catch the 3:00 train to Chicago. The Notre Dame paper reported: "At 1 o'clock carriages were taken for Niles, and amidst rousing cheers the University of Michigan football team departed, leaving behind them a most favorable impression."

=== 1888 games ===
After Michigan's visit to the campus in November 1887, football became a popular game on the Notre Dame campus. A football association was formed with Brother Paul as the president. In the spring of 1888, Brother Paul challenged Michigan to return to Notre Dame. Two games were scheduled for a weekend on April 20–21, 1888. On March 24, 1888, the Notre Dame student newspaper reported:

"Mr. DeHaven writes from Ann Arbor that the boys from the University of Michigan have such pleasant
remembrances of their Thanksgiving game here that they would like to play here again."

— The Scholastic newspaper report, March 27, 1888.

Michigan won the first game 26–6. The game was played at Green Stocking Ball Park before a crowd stated to be as low as 300 and as high as 800 spectators. Before the game was played, a 100-yard dash was run with players from both teams participating. Michigan's James E. Duffy defeated Harry Jewett, the American sprint champion, in the race. The game began at 3:20 p.m., and The Chronicle summarized the game as follows: "The feature of the game on our side was the tackling of Duffy, Harless, Babcock and Briggs, long runs and good passes by Rhodes, DeHaven, Wood, Ball and Button. As usual J. L. Duffy got in some good kicks."

The second game was played the next day, after the players were taken for a boat ride on St. Joseph's Lake. The game began at about 2:00 p.m. Michigan won 10–4. The spring games were a disappointment to some Michigan fans in that the Michigan football team had not allowed its opponents to score a single point since November 1883 – a span of more than four years. The Notre Dame team had scored 10 points in two games. DeHaven recalled that, when the Michigan players returned to Ann Arbor, they were booed on their arrival: "It was a badly battered team that landed in the crowded Ann Arbor depot, and we received a proper razzing for breaking a four-year record." No Michigan football team returned to play at Notre Dame until 1942.

== Roster ==
Two rosters are officially listed on the university's record books, the first from the 1887 game and the second after the games in the spring of 1888.

=== 1887 ===
- Left end: Frank Fehr
- Left tackle: Patrick Nelson
- Left guard: Edward Sawkins
- Center: George Houck
- Right guard: Frank Springer
- Right tackle: Tom O'Regan
- Right end: James Maloney
- Quarterback: George Cartier
- Left halfback: Joe Cusack
- Right halfback: Henry Luhn (captain)
- Fullback: Harry Jewett

=== Spring 1888 ===
- Left end: George Houck
- Left tackle: Gene Melady
- Left guard: Edward Sawkins
- Center: Frank Fehr
- Right guard: Frank Springer
- Right tackle: Patrick Nelson
- Right end: Joe Hepburn
- Quarterback: Joe Cusack
- Left halfback: Harry Jewett
- Right halfback: Henry Luhn (captain)
- Fullback: Edward Prudhomme
