= Edward Prudhomme =

American plantation owner and legislator (1869–1941)

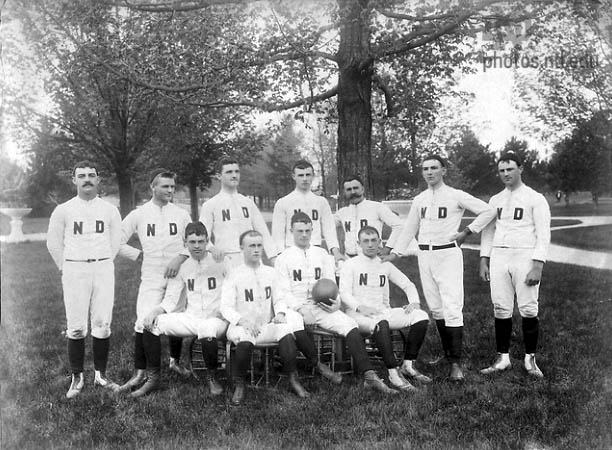
- Prudhomme, sitting far right

Notre Dame Fighting Irish
- Position: Fullback
- Class: 1891

Personal information
- Born: July 12, 1869; Bermuda, Louisiana, U.S.
- Died: February 5, 1941 (aged 71); Bermuda, Louisiana, U.S.

Career information
- College: Notre Dame (1887–1889)

Edward Carrington Prudhomme (July 12, 1869 – February 5, 1941) was an American plantation owner, state legislator, and the second football captain of the University of Notre Dame from 1888 to 1889.

== Early life ==
Prudhomme was born July 12, 1869, in Bermuda, Louisiana, at the Old Manor house on his father's plantation.

== Family ==
Prudhomme was one of eight siblings born to Jacques Prudhomme and Elisa LeComte.

He was a descendant of Emmanuel Prudhomme, who had fought for the French in the Revolutionary War and secured a tract of land for the family's plantation in Louisiana for his service.

Prudhomme married his cousin, Laura Prudhomme, on October 12, 1894. They had three children, Reginald, Myrtle, and Emma Lise.

Mildred Methvin, a federal and state judge in Louisiana, is a descendant of the Prudhomme family.

== Notre Dame ==
Prudhomme arrived at Notre Dame to pursue a commercial diploma in 1883. He was a member of the second Notre Dame football team in the spring of 1888. He played as a fullback, and is credited with kicking the team's first extra point in a 26–6 loss to Michigan (conversions via a kick were worth two points from 1883 to 1897). In the 1888 fall season, Prudhomme was elected to the honor of team captain, and presided over the first win in program history, a 20–0 shutout of Harvard Prep school of Chicago. Prudhomme was elected again in 1889, and became the first captain to serve for two consecutive years (Henry Luhn was technically the first to serve two seasons, doing so in the fall of 1887 and spring of 1888). He led the Fighting Irish to their first collegiate victory, a 9–0 shutout at Northwestern. He left the university with a 2–2 record, and a 2–0 record as a captain.

Prudhomme, along with nine of his other teammates, returned to the university in 1924 for the homecoming game against Georgia Tech.

== Later life ==
After graduating from the university in 1891, Prudhomme returned to work on his father's plantation in Louisiana. He became an assistant postmaster for the town of Bermuda, and served on the board of directors in the state farm bureau.

As of 1925, Prudhomme had served politically as a member of the Natchitoches Parish Democratic Executive Committee for the past thirty years. He succeeded his father Jacques as the parish's jury commissioner in 1904. In 1924, Prudhomme was elected to the Louisiana state legislature, and served on the committees on education and railroads.

Prudhomme died suddenly in 1941 in Natchitoches, Louisiana, at age 71.
