= Luhn (surname) =

Luhn is a surname.

Notable people with the surname include:

- Hans Peter Luhn (1896–1964), German-American information scientist, creator of a checksum formula
- Henry Luhn (1867–1932), American football player (Notre Dame), physician
- Matthew Luhn, American storyboard artist, animator, and writer
- Nolan Luhn (1921–2011), American football player (Green Bay Packers)
