= 1887 Cincinnati football team =

American college football season

1887 Cincinnati football
- Conference: Independent
- Record: 1–0
- Head coach: None
- Captain: Henry Bettmann

1887 Midwestern college football independents records
	Conf.			Overall
Team	W	L	T	W		L		T
Michigan		–		5	–	0	–	0
Minnesota		–		2	–	0	–	0
Cincinnati		–		1	–	0	–	0
Washington University		–		1	–	0	–	0
Butler		–		2	–	1	–	0
Indiana		–		0	–	1	–	0
Purdue		–		0	–	1	–	0
Wabash		–		0	–	1	–	0
Notre Dame		–		0	–	3	–	0
Albion		–		0	–	1	–	0

The 1887 Cincinnati football team was an American football team that represented the University of Cincinnati as an independent during the 1887 college football season. The team compiled a 1–0 record. Henry Bettman was the team captain. The team had no head coach.

== Schedule ==
Date	Opponent	Site	Result
November 5	Woodward High School	Cincinnati, OH	W 8–4
