= 1887 Michigan Wolverines football team =

American college football season

1887 Michigan Wolverines football
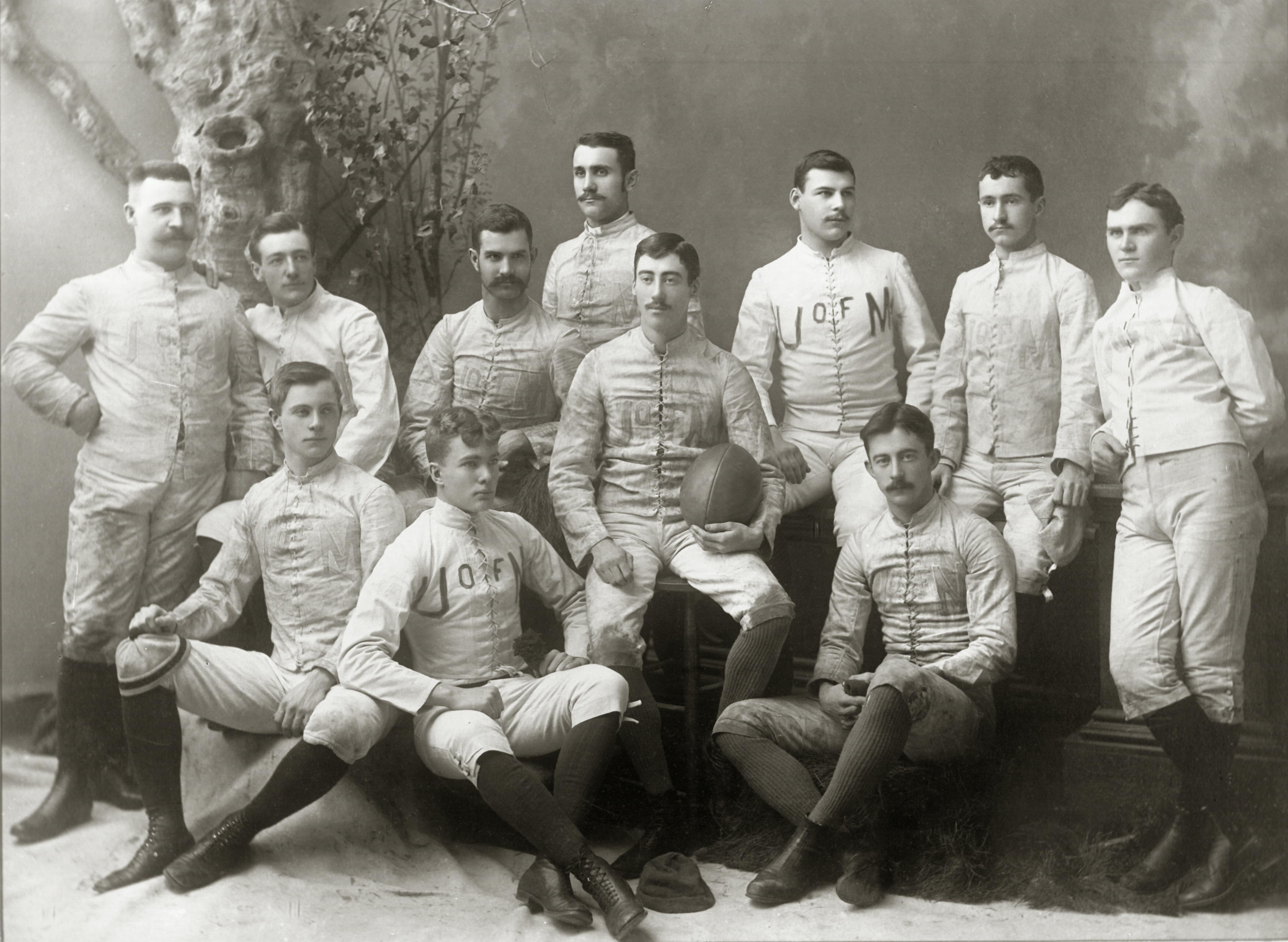
- Conference: Independent
- Record: 5–0
- Head coach: None
- Captain: John L. Duffy
- Home stadium: Ann Arbor Fairgrounds

1887 Midwestern college football independents records
	Conf.			Overall
Team	W	L	T	W		L		T
Michigan		–		5	–	0	–	0
Minnesota		–		2	–	0	–	0
Cincinnati		–		1	–	0	–	0
Washington University		–		1	–	0	–	0
Butler		–		2	–	1	–	0
Indiana		–		0	–	1	–	0
Purdue		–		0	–	1	–	0
Wabash		–		0	–	1	–	0
Notre Dame		–		0	–	3	–	0
Albion		–		0	–	1	–	0

The 1887 Michigan Wolverines football team represented the University of Michigan in the 1887 college football season. The team compiled a 5–0 record and outscored its opponents by a combined score of 102 to 10. The 1887 season capped three consecutive undefeated seasons in which Michigan won its games by a combined three-season total of 258 to 10. The captain of the 1887 team was John L. Duffy.

== Schedule ==
Date	Time	Opponent	Site	Result	Attendance
November 12	3:30 p.m.	Albion	Ann Arbor Fairgrounds; Ann Arbor, MI	W 32–0	300
November 23	11:00 a.m.	at Notre Dame	South Bend, IN (rivalry)	W 8–0	400–500
November 24	4:00 p.m.	at Chicago Harvard School	Chicago, IL	W 26–0	
April 20, 1888	3:20 p.m.	at Notre Dame	Green Stocking Ball Park; South Bend, IN	W 26–6	300–800
April 21, 1888		at Notre Dame	South Bend, IN	W 10–4	

== Game summaries ==
=== Michigan 32, Albion 0 ===
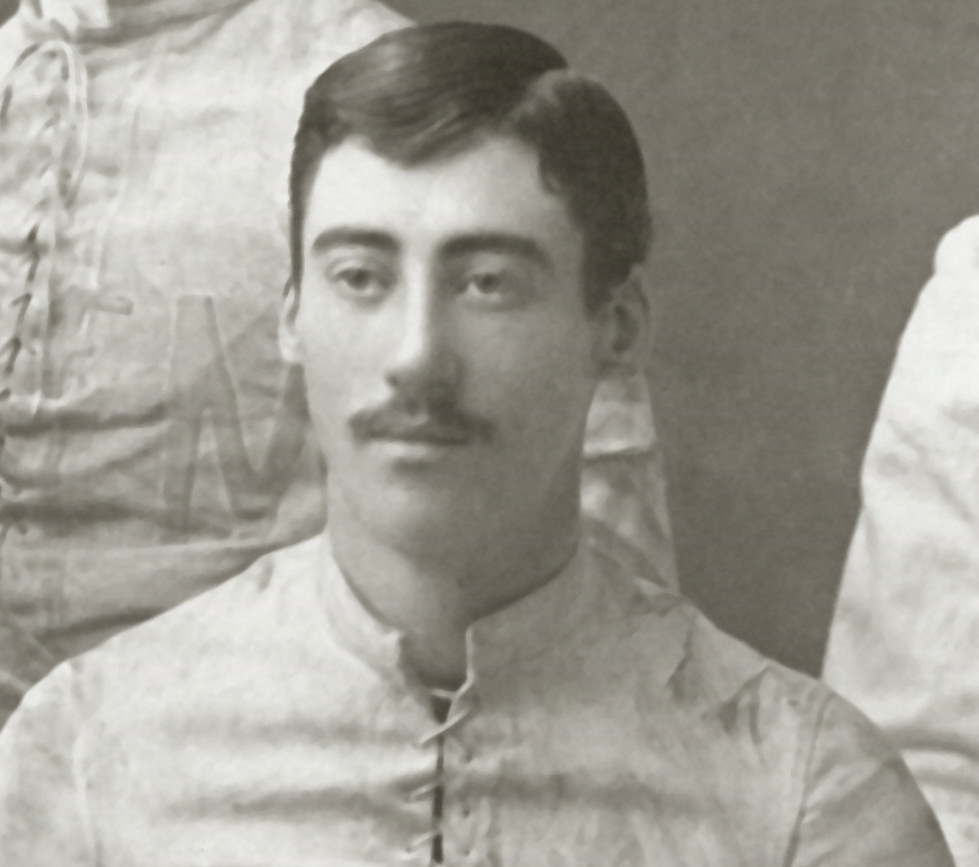
1887 Michigan team captain John Duffy

On November 12, 1887, the team opened its season against Albion College at the Ann Arbor Fairgrounds. The Chronicle of Ann Arbor reported: "The weather was fine, and the contest was witnessed by a fair crowd of spectators, but one that might have been larger." The game was preceded by the continuation of a wrestling match between two heavyweights named Malley and Jackson. Three hundred spectators watched the wrestling match, which lasted for between 30 and 45 minutes. The football game began between 3:00 p.m. and 3:30 p.m. Albion kicked off to start the game and Duffy immediately kicked the ball back to the middle of the field. In a scrimmage that followed, John Duffy "slipped through", scored Michigan's first touchdown, and kicked the goal from touchdown to give Michigan a 6–0 lead. Michigan scored two additional touchdowns and a safety in the first half (or "inning"), with the scores being made by Jim Duffy, Royal Farrand and Ernest Sprague. After a ten-minute break between halves, neither team scored in the first 18 minutes of the second half. John Duffy scored Michigan's fourth touchdown, and the kick for goal was successful. James Duffy scored Michigan's fifth touchdown, "the ball coming to him on the bound from the punt-out."

The Michigan Argonaut summarized Michigan's play as follows: "On the whole the boys played a good game. Their passing and running were excellent. Some of the new material is a great strengthening to the eleven. The inability to hold the rush line well was the greatest fault but they will take away with them a stronger one."

=== Michigan 8, Notre Dame 0 ===
Two of the players on Michigan's 1887 team, George Winthrop DeHaven, Jr. and William Warren Harless, had previously attended the University of Notre Dame. In October 1887, DeHaven wrote to Brother Paul, who ran Notre Dame's intramural athletics program, telling him about the new game of football. Michigan had planned a game in Chicago on Thanksgiving Day, and the three men, DeHaven, Harless and Brother Paul, persuaded their respective schools to play a football match on the Notre Dame campus on the day before Thanksgiving.

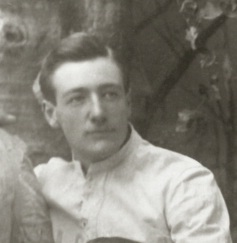
George DeHaven wrote to Brother Paul at Notre Dame in October 1887, describing the new game being played at Michigan.

On November 22, 1887, the Michigan football team departed from the Michigan Central Railroad Depot in Ann Arbor on the late train. After breakfast in Niles, Michigan, the team changed trains and arrived in South Bend between 7:00 a.m. and 8:00 a.m. The team was greeted by Father Superior Walsh and spent two hours touring the university buildings and departments of Notre Dame.

The game was the first played by Notre Dame, and the Michigan team was credited with teaching the Notre Dame team the game before play began. The Notre Dame student newspaper, Scholastic, reported:

"It was not considered a match contest, as the home team had been organized only a few weeks, and the Michigan boys, the champions of the West, came more to instruct them in the points of the Rugby game than to win fresh laurels."

Newspaper accounts differ as to whether the football game started at 10:00 a.m. or 11:00 a.m. The proceedings began with a tutorial session in which players from both teams were divided irrespective of college. For the first 30 minutes, the teams scrimmaged in a practice game with Michigan "exchanging six men for the same number from Notre Dame."

After the practice session, the Michigan and Notre Dame teams played a game that lasted only half an hour which was described by The Chronicle as follows:

"The grounds were in very poor condition for playing, being covered with snow in a melting condition, and the players could scarcely keep their feet. Some time had been spent in preliminary practice; the game began and after rolling and tumbling in the mud for half an hour time was finally called, the score standing 8 to 0 in favor of U. of M."

Between 400 and 500 students watched the game. After the game, the team ate at the Notre Dame dining hall. The Notre Dame student newspaper reported on the gratitude of Notre Dame officials for Michigan's tutorial in the game of football: "After a hearty dinner, Rev. President Walsh thanked the Ann Arbor team for their visit, and assured them of the cordial reception that would always await them at Notre Dame." Brother Paul arranged for carriages to take the team to Niles in time to catch the 3:00 train to Chicago. The Notre Dame paper reported: "At 1 o'clock carriages were taken for Niles, and amidst rousing cheers the University of Michigan football team departed, leaving behind them a most favorable impression."

Michigan's lineup against Notre Dame was J.L. Duffy (fullback), J. E. Duffy and E. McPheran (halfbacks), R. T. Farrand (quarterback), W. W. Harless (center rush), F. Townsend, E. M. Sprague, F. H. Knapp, W. Fowler, G. W. DeHaven and M. Wade (rush line).

This was the first game in the Michigan–Notre Dame football rivalry.

=== Michigan 26, Chicago Harvard School 0 ===
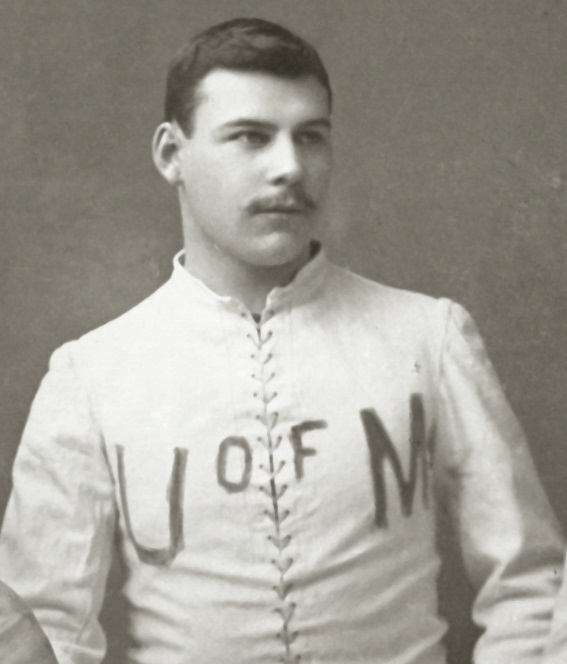
Center William Harless scored a touchdown against Harvard "by good rushing"

The team left Notre Dame on the afternoon of November 22, changed trains in Niles, and arrived by train in Chicago at 7:00 p.m. After a night enjoying the sites of Chicago, the team returned to the hotel at 11:00 p.m.

The team had planned on a Thanksgiving Day game against Northwestern, but the game could not be arranged. Instead, a match against the Harvard school team was played. The Chronicle noted that the team from the Harvard school was superior to Northwestern, "having defeated Northwestern 28 to 4 and having never before been beaten." The Michigan team lounged around the hotel before departing for the game, which was played on a wet and muddy field at the grounds of the Wanderer Cricket Club (referred to in some reports as Wanderers' park) at 37th Street and Indiana Avenue. The game had been scheduled to begin at 3:00 p.m., but was delayed until 4:00 p.m. John Duffy scored the first touchdown, and the goal was made for a 6–0 lead. Jim Duffy scored the second touchdown on a play described as follows: "Farrand sends it accurately back to Jim Duffy who makes the circle of the field, passing all opponents and secures the second touchdown." Harvard was held for a safety to make the score 14–0. The remainder of the game was played in darkness. William Harless scored Michigan's third touchdown "by good rushing" and breaking through all opponents. Jim Duffy scored Michigan's fourth touchdown. After five more minutes, the game was called with Michigan leading 26 to 0. The Michigan Argonaut wrote that Michigan's score "would have easily been doubled" were it not for the "treacherous nature of the field" and a ball so slippery that "it was almost impossible to hold."

The Chronicle described the return from the game as follows: "Tired out, wet, and covered with mud and glory we returned to the hotel. Some swallow a hasty supper and hurry to catch the train but most of us wait till the next day to start for home. All the boys thoroughly enjoyed themselves and voted it a big time."

Michigan's lineup against the Harvard club was Harless (center), Fowler, Sprague, Townsend, Knapp, Wade and DeHaven (rushers), Farrand (quarterback), John Duffy (fullback) and MacPherran and J. E. Duffy (halfbacks).

=== Michigan 26, Notre Dame 6 ===
After Michigan's visit to South Bend in November, football became a popular game on the Notre Dame campus. A football association was formed with Brother Paul as the president. In the spring of 1888, Brother Paul challenged Michigan to return to South Bend. On March 24, 1888, the Notre Dame student newspaper reported, "Mr. DeHaven writes from Ann Arbor that the boys of the University of Michigan have such pleasant remembrances of their Thanksgiving game here that they are anxious to play here again." The games were scheduled for a Friday and Saturday, April 20 and 21, 1888.

Due to injuries, several of Michigan's best players were unable to participate. Quarterback Royal Farrand was left home with his knee in a cast and was replaced by Ball. Sprague and Townsend from the rush line were injured during practice the week before the trip and were replaced by R. S. Babcock and Button. DeHaven recalled, "We were totally unprepared, but I got five starters to go, and with Harless and I (we wanted to see our South Bend friends) and four of our friends, who had never played, and a referee, we went." In his history of the Michigan-Notre Dame rivalry, John Kyrk contends that two of the players who DeHaven recruited for the trip, G. Briggs and E. Rhodes, were non-student "ringers."

Michigan won the first game on April 21 by a score of 26 to 6. The game was played at Green Stocking Ball Park before a crowd stated to be as low as 300 and as high as 800 spectators. Before the game was played, a 100-yard dash was run with players from both teams participating. Michigan's James E. Duffy defeated Harry Jewett, the American sprint champion, in the race. The game began at 3:20 p.m., and James Duffy scored the first touchdown after three-and-a-half minutes of play. The Chronicle summarized the game as follows: "The feature of the game on our side was the tackling of Duffy, Harless, Babcock and Briggs, long runs and good passes by Rhodes, DeHaven, Wood, Ball and Button. As usual J. L. Duffy got in some good kicks."

=== Michigan 10, Notre Dame 4 ===
The second game of the spring trip was played on the Notre Dame campus, after the players were taken on a boat ride in St. Joseph's Lake. The game began at about 2:00 p.m. Michigan won by a closer-than-expected score of 10 to 4. The spring games were a disappointment in that the Michigan football team had not allowed its opponents to score a single point since November 1883—a span of more than four years. The Notre Dame team had scored 10 points in two games. DeHaven recalled that, when the Michigan players returned to Ann Arbor, they were booed on their arrival: "It was a badly battered team that landed in the crowded Ann Arbor depot, and we received a proper razzing for breaking a four-year record." No Michigan football team returned to play at Notre Dame until 1942.

== Players ==
=== Varsity letter winners ===
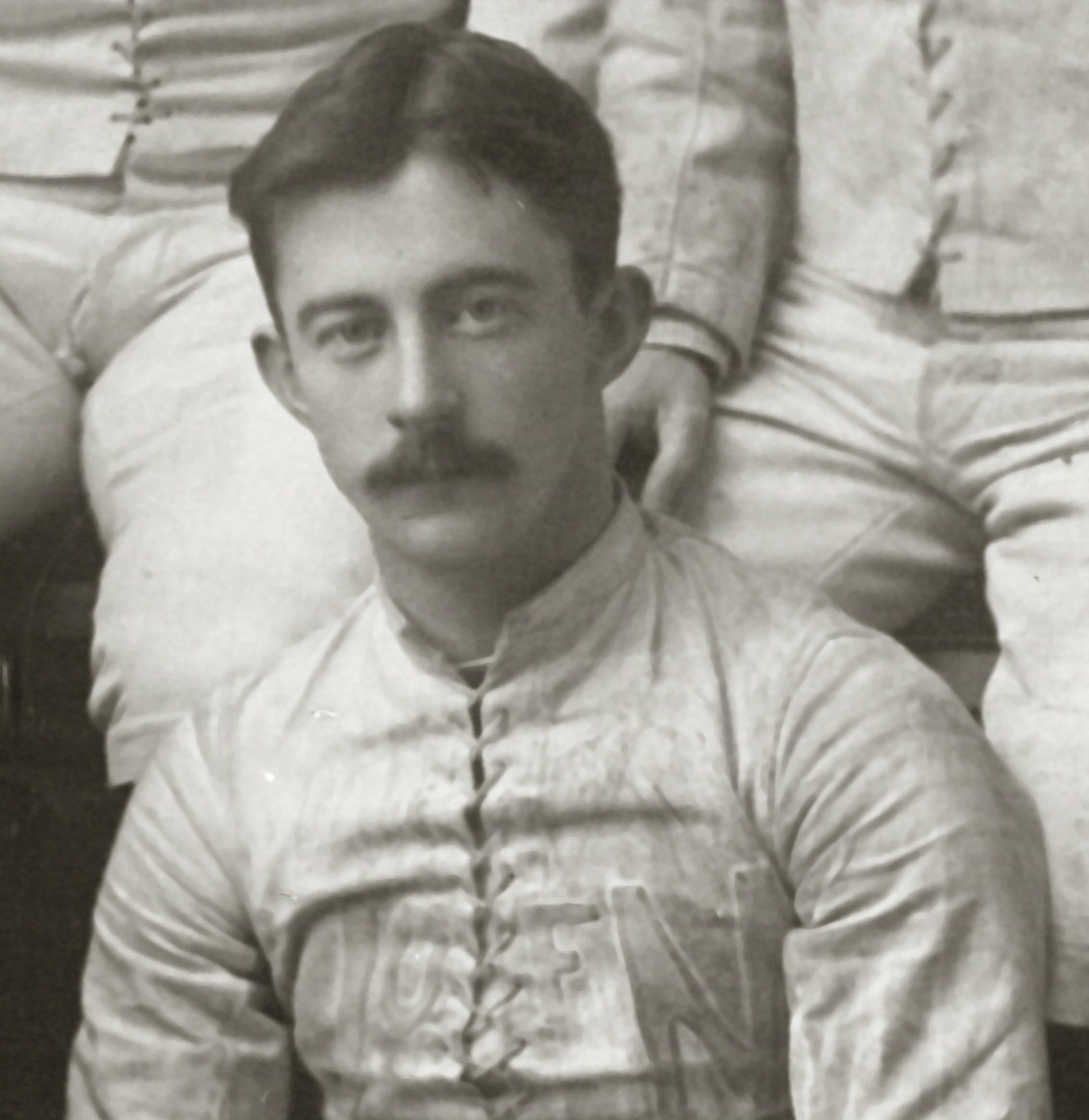
Halfback James Duffy was one of the leading scorers for the 1887 team.

- George W. DeHaven, Chicago – left end
- James E. Duffy, Ann Arbor, Michigan – left halfback
- John H. Duffie, Port Huron, Michigan – right guard
- John L. Duffy, Ann Arbor, Michigan – fullback
- Royal T. Farrand, Detroit, Michigan – quarterback
- William W. Harless, Chicago – center
- Lincoln C. MacMillan, Ann Arbor, Michigan – right end
- Edgar Withrow MacPherran, Marquette, Michigan – right halfback
- Ernest Sprague, Farmington, Michigan – left guard
- Fred Townsend, El Paso, Texas – left tackle
- George H. Wood, Dayton, Ohio – right tackle

=== Others ===
- R.S. Babcock, substitute, Ann Arbor, Michigan
- Leverage Knapp, substitute, Ouleout, New York
- John T. Scott, substitute, Galveston, Texas
- Mulford Wade (died November 1926 in Akron, Ohio), substitute, Cleveland, Ohio
