= 1887 Purdue football team =

American college football season

1887 Purdue football
- Conference: Independent
- Record: 0–1
- Head coach: Albert Berg (1st season)
- Captain: J. B. Burris

1887 Midwestern college football independents records
	Conf.			Overall
Team	W	L	T	W		L		T
Michigan		–		5	–	0	–	0
Minnesota		–		2	–	0	–	0
Cincinnati		–		1	–	0	–	0
Washington University		–		1	–	0	–	0
Butler		–		2	–	1	–	0
Indiana		–		0	–	1	–	0
Purdue		–		0	–	1	–	0
Wabash		–		0	–	1	–	0
Notre Dame		–		0	–	3	–	0
Albion		–		0	–	1	–	0

The 1887 Purdue football team was an American football team that represented Purdue University as an independent during the 1887 college football season. The team compiled an 0–1 record in the university's first season fielding an intercollegiate football team. Albert Berg, a deaf 23-year-old Princeton University alumnus, was the team's coach. The team of 12 players practiced for one week before playing in the school's first official football game.

The Purdue University football team traces its origin back to October 29, 1887, when its team fell to Butler College by a score of 48–6 in Indianapolis, Indiana. A group of students at Purdue University formed the school's first football team in 1887. Albert Berg was hired as the coach. Despite being deaf, Berg was reportedly "the only man in the territory with any knowledge of the game." Berg was 23 years old when he became Purdue's football "coacher." He was paid $1 for each lesson he gave to the newly organized football team and had only one week to prepare the team for its first game. The 1887 Purdue team played its only game on October 29, 1887, against the Butler College team at Athletic Park in Indianapolis. Butler soundly defeated Berg's squad by a score of 48–6.

J. B. Burris was the team captain.

== Schedule ==
Date	Time	Opponent	Site	Result	Source
October 29	3:05 p.m.	at Butler	Athletic Park; Indianapolis, IN	L 6–48	

== Roster ==
- Henry Luke Bolley
- J. B. Burris
- Henry Caraway
- Charles Gough
- R. Gregory
- L. D. Hord
- Dumont Lotz
- B. F. McCoy
- Charles Middleton
- John Moore
- W. J. Ransdall
