= Farrands =

Farrands is a surname. Notable people with the surname include:

- Daniel Farrands (born 1969), American filmmaker
- Frank Farrands (1835–1916), English cricketer and umpire
- John Farrands (1921–1996), Australian public servant and scientist

== See also ==
- Farrand
