= 1887 Indiana Hoosiers football team =

American college football season

1887 Indiana Hoosiers football
- Conference: Independent
- Record: 0–1
- Head coach: Arthur B. Woodford (1st season)
- Captain: Harry Wise

1887 Midwestern college football independents records
	Conf.			Overall
Team	W	L	T	W		L		T
Michigan		–		5	–	0	–	0
Minnesota		–		2	–	0	–	0
Cincinnati		–		1	–	0	–	0
Washington University		–		1	–	0	–	0
Butler		–		2	–	1	–	0
Indiana		–		0	–	1	–	0
Purdue		–		0	–	1	–	0
Wabash		–		0	–	1	–	0
Notre Dame		–		0	–	3	–	0
Albion		–		0	–	1	–	0

The 1887 Indiana Hoosiers football team was an American football team that represented Indiana University Bloomington during the 1887 college football season. In its first season of intercollegiate football, economics professor Arthur B. Woodford served as the school's football coach, and fullback Harry Wise was the team's captain. Indiana played one game, arranged by the Indianapolis Athletic Club as part of a series of "rugby games of foot ball" intended to establish the college championship of Indiana. Indiana was matched against the team from Franklin College with the game set for October 15, 1887. In a game played at Athletic Park in Indianapolis, Franklin won, 10–8. The roster of Indiana's 1887 football team included Thomas M. Honan, who later served as the State of Indiana's Attorney General, W. E. Jenkins, who became the Indiana University librarian, and George B. Davis, of Greensburg, Indiana.

== Schedule ==
Date	Time	Opponent	Site	Result	Source
October 15	3:15 p.m.	vs. Franklin (IN)	Athletic Park; Indianapolis, IN	L 8–10	
