= 1887 Minnesota Golden Gophers football team =

American college football season

1887 Minnesota Golden Gophers football
- Conference: Independent
- Record: 2–0
- Head coach: Frederick S. Jones (2nd season)
- Captain: Alfred Pillsbury

1887 Midwestern college football independents records
	Conf.			Overall
Team	W	L	T	W		L		T
Michigan		–		5	–	0	–	0
Minnesota		–		2	–	0	–	0
Cincinnati		–		1	–	0	–	0
Washington University		–		1	–	0	–	0
Butler		–		2	–	1	–	0
Indiana		–		0	–	1	–	0
Purdue		–		0	–	1	–	0
Wabash		–		0	–	1	–	0
Notre Dame		–		0	–	3	–	0
Albion		–		0	–	1	–	0

The 1887 Minnesota Golden Gophers football team represented the University of Minnesota as an independent during the 1887 college football season. It was the second season under head coach Frederick S. Jones. For this season, the Ariel recorded that "The alumni have had their turn and the Minneapolis high school had been met and conquered," but a hoped-for game against Michigan couldn't be arranged and no other recorded games were played this season.

On one occasion, while getting the team ready to play, Alf Pillsbury noticed that the team was short a man, so he recruited a student from the group of Minneapolis Central students who were on hand. His name was Pudge Heffelfinger and after playing for Minnesota for a year, he went on to Yale and became one of the biggest names in the early days of football.

Team of 1887: Rushers, Paul Goode (center), Fred M. Mann, John H. Corliss, Birney Trask, William H. Hoyt, Henry S. Morris, Edmund P. Allen; Quarterback, Alf Pillsbury (center); Halfbacks, John F. Hayden, William D. Willard; Back, Alonzo D. Meeds; Substitutes, W. Dann, Walter Heffelfinger.

== Schedule ==
Date	Opponent	Site	Result
October 24	Minneapolis High School	Minneapolis, MN	W 8–0
November 12	Alumni	Minneapolis, MN	W 14–0
