= Albert Berg =

American football player and coach

Biographical details
- Born: April 16, 1864; Lafayette, Indiana, U.S.
- Died: March 5, 1945 (aged 80); Council Bluffs, Iowa, U.S.

Coaching career (HC unless noted)
- 1887: Purdue

Head coaching record
- Overall: 0–1

Albert Berg (April 16, 1864 – March 5, 1945) was an American football player, coach, teacher, and an advocate, writer and editor on issues of concern to the deaf. Berg was rendered deaf as the result of a childhood bout of spinal meningitis. He played football in Washington, D.C. at the school that became known as Gallaudet University. Despite being deaf, he became the first football coach at Purdue University, coaching the team to an 0–1 record in the inaugural 1887 season. Berg also coached football at Franklin College and Butler University. He later served for more than 40 years as a teacher at the Indiana School for the Deaf.

== Early years ==
Berg was born in Lafayette, Indiana in 1864. His mother died when he was an infant, and he contracted spinal meningitis as a boy. The illness rendered Berg deaf. Berg was sent to the Indiana Institution for the Deaf in Indianapolis where he was a student for nine years.

After leaving the Indiana Institution for the Deaf, Berg enrolled at the "Columbia Institution for the Instruction of the Deaf and Dumb" (later renamed Gallaudet University), run by Edward Miner Gallaudet in Washington, D.C. He was a halfback and captain of the football team at Gallaudet. Berg later recalled:"In passing and kicking the ball, I was considered exceptionally strong." He received a bachelor's degree from Gallaudet in 1886.

Several sources report that Berg was an alumnus of Princeton University. Other sources dispute Berg's having any connection with Princeton.

== Purdue football coach ==
A group of students at Purdue University formed the school's first football team in 1887. Berg was hired as the coach. Despite being deaf, Berg was reportedly "the only man in the territory with any knowledge of the game." Berg was 23 years old when he became Purdue's football "coacher". He was paid $1 for each lesson he gave to the newly organized football team and had only one week to prepare the team for its first game. The 1887 Purdue team played its only game on October 29, 1887, against the Butler College team at Athletic Park in Indianapolis. Butler soundly defeated Berg's squad by a score of 48–6. After the loss to Butler, Purdue did not field a football team again until 1889.

Newspaper columnist George Ade (for whom Ross–Ade Stadium is named) described the loss to Butler as "a low comedy reproduction of the Custer massacre at Little Big Horn," and noted that the deaf Berg had been given an unenviable task to "take charge of the halt, the lame, the blind, and the perniciously anemic to imbue them with stamina, courage and strategy."

Berg later recalled how his condition impacted his coaching: "On account of my inability to hear and my ability to talk only to a limited extent and on account of the game being practically brand new in this part of the country, my instruction was mainly by imitation of my own playing, and the way they caught on and improved upon it would have encouraged and delighted any coach." According to another account, Berg's coaching "consisted of excited sign language and some rather bizarre sounds from his throat which his players correctly translated as pure profanity."

== Teaching career and advocacy ==
After his brief stint as Purdue's football coach, Berg worked briefly as an architect's apprentice and with the YMCA and the Chicago stockyards. He also returned to coaching briefly at Franklin College and at Butler University.

In the late 1880s, he became a teacher at the Indiana School for the Deaf. He taught there for between 41 and 45 years until retiring in 1933. He received a Master of Arts degree from Gallaudet in 1895. He delivered his thesis on "Labor and Capital" to an audience that included President Grover Cleveland, though Cleveland reportedly fell asleep during Berg's presentation.

Berg also became an advocate for the deaf. He lobbied for better pay for deaf teachers, wrote several books, served as an editor for "The Silent Hoosier", and published "Who's Who of the Deaf". Berg also sold life insurance, mostly to the deaf, for an eastern insurance company. He reportedly sold over $1 million in policies.

Berg preferred not to be remembered as a football coach. In his autobiography, "From My Reliquary of Memories", Berg wrote:

Many years ago, my picture appeared in 'Believe It or Not' in newspapers over the country, as 'Deaf Mute Football Coach at Purdue.' Friends in several distant cities sent me the clippings from their home papers. Each football season, papers here and there have printed something about the role I played, one or two with my picture, and I have been asked to write articles on my coaching experiences, as though I had never done anything else worth while in my life. I got fed-up long ago and know I have not yet heard the last of it. The subject may wind up in my obituary.

== Family and later years ==
In approximately 1890, Berg was married to his wife, Maude, who was 21 years old and had been a student at the Indiana School for the Deaf. They had two children, Myrtle born in May 1891, and Lloyd born in September 1898. After retiring in 1933, Berg and his wife moved to the Mount Airy neighborhood in Philadelphia, where he was employed by the New England Life Insurance Company. In October 1939, Berg fell and sustained a broken hip. After the injury, Berg and his wife moved to Council Bluffs, Iowa, where their son Lloyd was employed as the superintendent of the Iowa School for the Deaf. Berg never recovered from the broken hip and remained confined to his room for the final six years of his life. His wife died in 1942, and he died three years later after experiencing a stroke at age 80.

== Head coaching record ==
Year	Team	Overall	Conference	Standing	Bowl/playoffs
Purdue (Independent) (1887)
1887	Purdue	0–1			
Purdue:		0–1			
Total:		0–1			
