= Royal T. Farrand =

American football player and medical doctor (1867–1927)

Royal Farrand
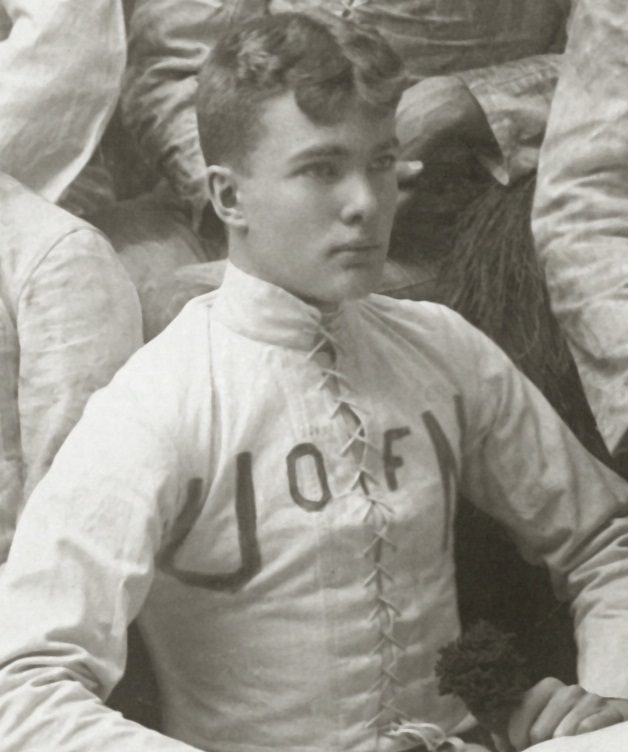
- Born: October 8, 1867; Detroit, Michigan, United States
- Died: March 28, 1927 (aged 59); Appleton, Wisconsin
- Education: University of Michigan
- Known for: Football player/Medical doctor

Royal Twombly Farrand (October 8, 1867 – March 28, 1927) was an American football player and medical doctor. He was the quarterback of the undefeated 1887 Michigan Wolverines football team and led Michigan to a victory in the first meeting in the Michigan–Notre Dame football rivalry.

== Early life ==
Farrand was born in 1867 in Detroit, the son of David Osburn Farrand, a surgeon. He graduated from high school in Detroit in 1886 and enrolled at the University of Michigan.

== College and medical school ==
As a freshman, Farrand was the starting quarterback for the undefeated 1887 Michigan Wolverines football team that outscored its opponents by a combined score of 102 to 10. In November 1887, Farrand led Michigan to an 8–0 win over Notre Dame in the first meeting between the two schools. However, when the teams agreed to play two additional games in the spring of 1888, Farrand was left home in Ann Arbor with his knee in a cast and was replaced by Ball. He was also a highly rated boxer while attending the University of Michigan. In his most famous bout, he fought the mayor of St. Clair, Michigan, with both competitors being knocked out in the third round.

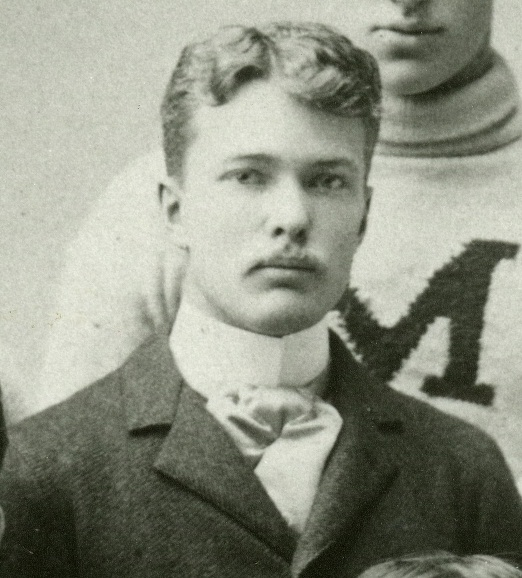
Farrand in 1891 as team manager

After graduating in 1890, Farrand returned to Ann Arbor for medical school and served as the manager of the 1891 team. While serving as manager of the football team in 1891, Farrand hired the team's first coach. On October 13, 1891, The Michigan Daily reported that the Athletic Association had instructed Farrand to retain Mike Murphy, trainer of the Detroit Athletic Club, "for a few days to get the team in shape to turn over to a coach." Farrand graduated from Michigan's medical school in 1892 and subsequently took post-graduate work at the New York College of Physicians and Surgeons.

== Medical career, family and later years ==
After completing his medical studies, Farrand worked for a time as an intern at the Atlantic Copper Mine Hospital in Houghton, Michigan. He next practiced medicine in Detroit.

In June 1898, a Detroit court ordered Farrand committed to the Oak Grove Asylum in Flint, Michigan. He had reportedly given "signs of breaking down" under the strain of excessive study and work. One newspaper reported that Farrand was suffering from "dementia as a result of hard work."

Farrand moved to Niagara, Wisconsin, where he worked for nine years as a physician at the Kimberly-Clark mill. In approximately 1907, he moved back to Houghton. In approximately 1922, he moved to Appleton, Wisconsin, where he worked as a part-time assistant in swimming and "basement management" at the Appleton YMCA.

Farrand married Jessie Douglas MacNaughton in September 1896 in Calumet, Michigan. They had three children, Isabel Douglas Farrand (born 1898 in Detroit), David Osburn Farrand (born 1902 in Niagara) and Katherine MacNaughton Farrand (born 1905 in Niagara).

In March 1927, Farrand died in Appleton at age 58. He was buried at Elmwood Cemetery in Detroit.
