= 1887 Butler Christians football team =

American college football season

1887 Butler Christians football
- Conference: Independent
- Record: 2–1
- Head coach: Clinton L. Hare (1st season)
- Home stadium: Athletic Park

1887 Midwestern college football independents records
	Conf.			Overall
Team	W	L	T	W		L		T
Michigan		–		5	–	0	–	0
Minnesota		–		2	–	0	–	0
Cincinnati		–		1	–	0	–	0
Washington University		–		1	–	0	–	0
Butler		–		2	–	1	–	0
Indiana		–		0	–	1	–	0
Purdue		–		0	–	1	–	0
Wabash		–		0	–	1	–	0
Notre Dame		–		0	–	3	–	0
Albion		–		0	–	1	–	0

The 1887 Butler Christians football team represented Butler University as an independent during the 1887 college football season. Led by first-year head coach Clinton L. Hare, Butler compiled a record of 2–1.

== Schedule ==
Date	Time	Opponent	Site	Result	Source
October 29	3:05 p.m.	Purdue	Athletic Park; Indianapolis, IN	W 48–6	
November 5	3:00 p.m.	Franklin (IN)	Athletic Park; Indianapolis, IN	W 43–11	
November 12	2:00 p.m.	Hanover	Athletic Park; Indianapolis, IN	L 8–10	
