= Edwin S. Votey =

American entrepreneur and inventor

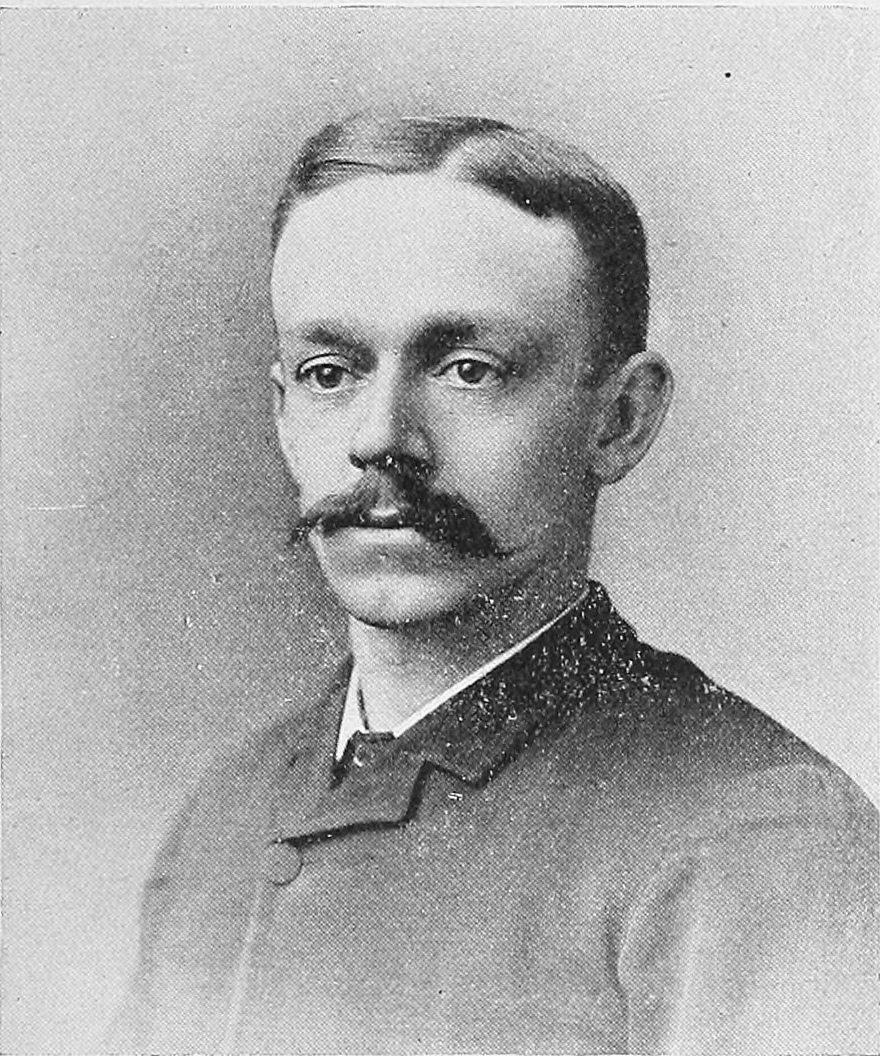
- Circa 1895
- Born: June 8, 1856; Ovid, New York, U.S.
- Died: January 21, 1931 (aged 74); Summit, New Jersey, U.S.
- Occupation(s): inventor, manufacturer
- Spouse: Annie M. Gray
- Children: 3

Edwin Scott Votey (June 8, 1856 – January 21, 1931) was an American businessman, inventor, industrial designer, and manufacturer of pianos and organs. He worked in the organ field all his adult life and had over twenty patents. He invented or co-invented several inventions for World War I. One was a pilotless airplane that was going to be used to drop bombs on the enemy but was never used.

He invented the first practical piano player in 1895. It was a cabinet-like box mechanism attached to a conventional piano that automatically played the piano. It was foot operated and played a song through a programmed perforated paper roll. The mechanism was given the name Pianola and was made commercially available to the public in 1898. The original was given to the Smithsonian Museum.

== Early life ==
Votey was born in Ovid, New York, on June 8, 1856. His father was Charles Votey, a Baptist pastor. Votey moved with his family to West Brattleboro, Vermont in April 1873. His father had been put in charge of a newly established Baptist church there. He lived in this town until 1879. Votey went to the local public schools in Ovid and West Brattleboro for his initial formal education.

== Mid life ==
Votey started his first full-time job as a clerk for the Estey Organ Company in Brattleboro in 1873. He became a salesman for them in 1877. Votey's interest in organs and their construction was sparked with this company. He moved to Detroit in 1883 to become a mechanical engineer and salesman for the newly formed Whitney Organ Company. He was in a management position. Clark J. Whitney and Votey were the initial owners of the company. William R. Farrand joined them a few months after the company was organized and became the company's Secretary/Treasurer. Whitney sold all of his equity interest in the firm to Votey and Farrand in 1890. The Detroit company reorganized to become Farrand & Votey Organ Company. It bought out Granville Wood Pipe Organ Company at that time. Votey took off six months for the interest of his company in 1890 and went to Europe to study the construction of pipe and reed organs. His reed organ manufacturing company then had added pipe organs to its line of products.

== Inventions ==
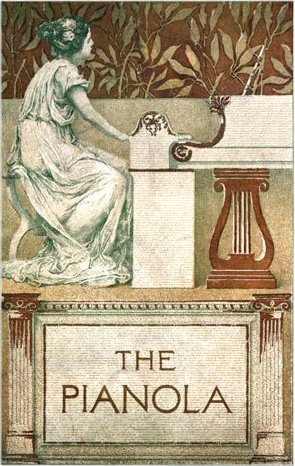
Aeolian Company's first Pianola catalog, 1898.

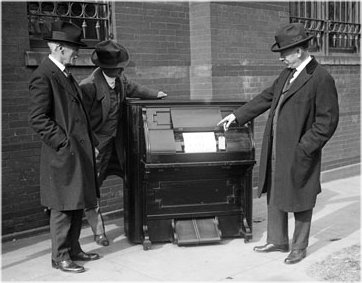
Original Pianola piano player being presented to Smithsonian Museum as gift by Edwin S. Votey the inventor (right, pointing) on December 7, 1922.

Votey had over twenty patents on pianos and organs and related items. He invented or co-invented several inventions used in World War I. One of note was a pilotless airplane that was going to be used to drop bombs and explosives on the German army had the war continued beyond 1918.

Votey in 1895 invented the first practical self playing mechanical piano that played complete musical performances by means of perforated paper rolls patterned for a particular piece of music. The cabinet device could be attached to and removed from a typical piano. Prototype testing for manufacturing the product started at the end of 1896 by Aeolian Company. In 1897, at the age of 41, Votey became vice president of the company. Votey filed his patent application for the piano player on January 25, 1897. It was issued to him on May 22, 1900.

The self playing mechanical piano device was put into full production and introduced to the public in 1898. It was a mechanical piano player and received the name Pianola by the Aeolian Company, which was their trademark. The company came out with their first Pianola catalog in 1898 that introduced their new line of Pianola products. Votey's first Pianola piano player was given to the Smithsonian Museum in Washington, D.C., on December 2, 1922.

The large as a piano device was a cabinet-like box mechanism that was pushed up to and attached to a conventional piano. The piano player mechanism was operated by the performer with their feet pushing pedals for the power needed to make the device work by generating suction. The inside of the device consisted of a set of small pneumatics that were exposed to this suction as a result of air passing through the holes of the rolled paper. The air received on the other side from a particular hole in the perforated scroll roll activated a valve to expose the pneumatic to suction, and through a set of linkage arms to ultimately trigger a small felt covered wooden lever, acting like a finger, that struck the corresponding correct piano key. As the roll of perforated paper spun around on its axis the small punched out holes patterned for a music piece passed the air through that triggered the mechanical fingers that played the music.

Several examples of Votey's player piano products may be seen and heard at the Musical Museum in Brentford, London, England.

== Personal life ==
Votey was a director at the Detroit First National Bank and Trust Company. He was a board member at the Detroit National Lock Washer Company. Votey was an officer at the State Title and Mortgage Company. He retired from business in April 1930 and went to his vacation summer home at Lake Dunmore in July. Soon after arriving he became ill and went to the Porter Hospital at Middlebury, Vermont. In September 1930, he returned to his permanent residence in Summit, New Jersey. Votey's health continued to deteriorate from then on. He died at his home in Summit on January 21, 1931. Votey was married in 1878 to Annie M. Gray and they had three children, Charles, Fanny, and Edwina.

== Sources ==
- Dolge, Alfred (1911). Pianos and Their Makers. Covina publishing Company. OCLC 840505557.
- Kane, Joseph Nathan (1997). Famous First Facts, Fifth Edition. The H. W. Wilson Company. OCLC 970714418.
- Mitchell, William J. (2004). Me++; The Cyborg Self and the Networked City. MIT Press. ISBN 0-26225-046-2.
- Ochse, Orpha (1975). History of the Organ in U. S. Indiana University Press. ISBN 9780253204950. OCLC 1164778098.
- Ord-Hume, Arthur W. J. G. (1970). Player Piano: History of Mechanical Piano. The H. W. Wilson Company. OCLC 478540868. "The first pneumatic piano player that was practical was the Pianola, invented in 1896 by Edwin S. Votey of Detroit, MI, who received a patent on May 22, 1900. The patent was for an attachment of practical and economical construction that could be applied to and removed from any piano. It was introduced by Aeolian Company."
- Rosen, Gary A. (2020). Adventures of a Jazz Age Lawyer. University of California Press. ISBN 978-0520969759.
