= William R. Farrand =

American businessman

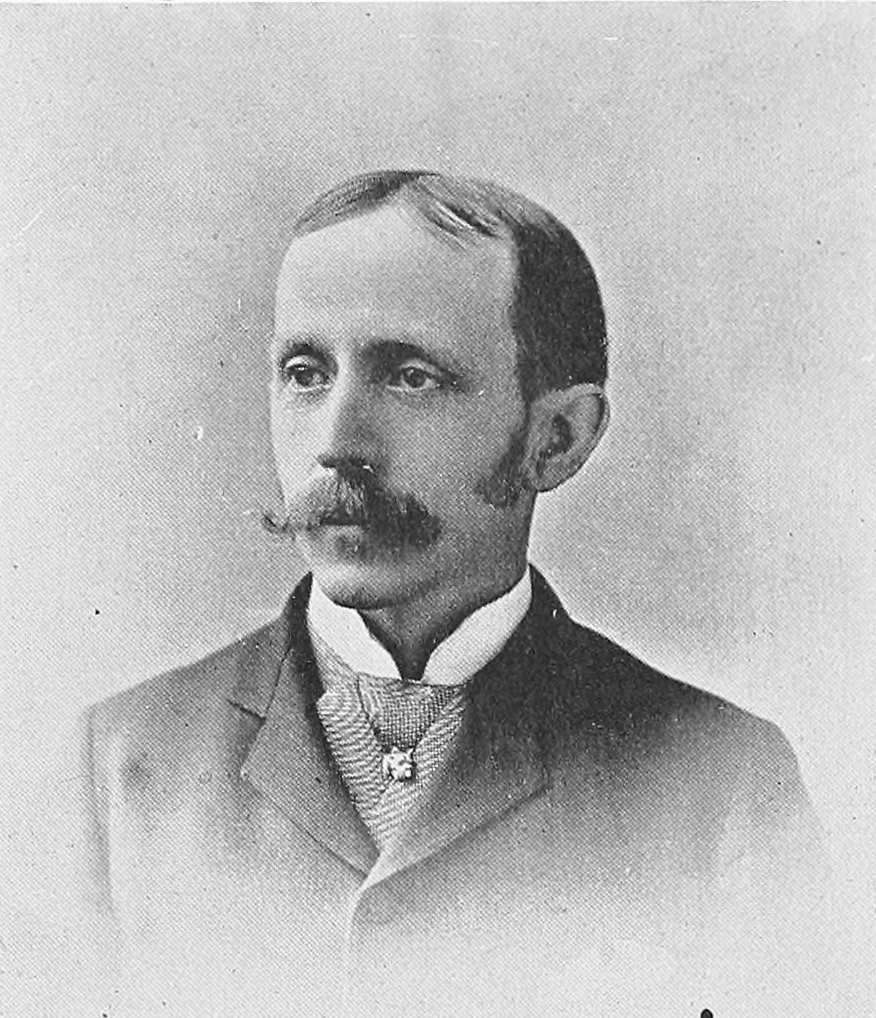
- Circa 1895
- Born: September 9, 1853; Detroit, Michigan, US
- Died: August 15, 1930 (aged 76); Detroit, Michigan, US
- Occupation: manufacturer
- Spouse: Cora Belle Wallace
- Children: 2

William Raynolds Farrand (September 9, 1853 – August 15, 1930) was an American businessman, industrial designer, and manufacturer of pianos and organs. He was president of the Farrand Organ Company that specialized in manufacturing reed organs. He held an executive position in several businesses in the state of Michigan. He was a civic leader associated with many organizations and churches throughout the United States.

== Early life ==
Farrand was born in Detroit, Michigan, on September 9, 1853, to Olive Maria née Coe and Jacob Shaw Farrand, who were married in Ohio in 1841. His father became a resident of Detroit in 1830. Farrand received his initial formal schooling at the Detroit public schools. He had a younger brother, Jacob Shaw Farrand Jr., and three sisters, Mary Coe, Martha Electa, and Olive Curtis.

== Business career ==
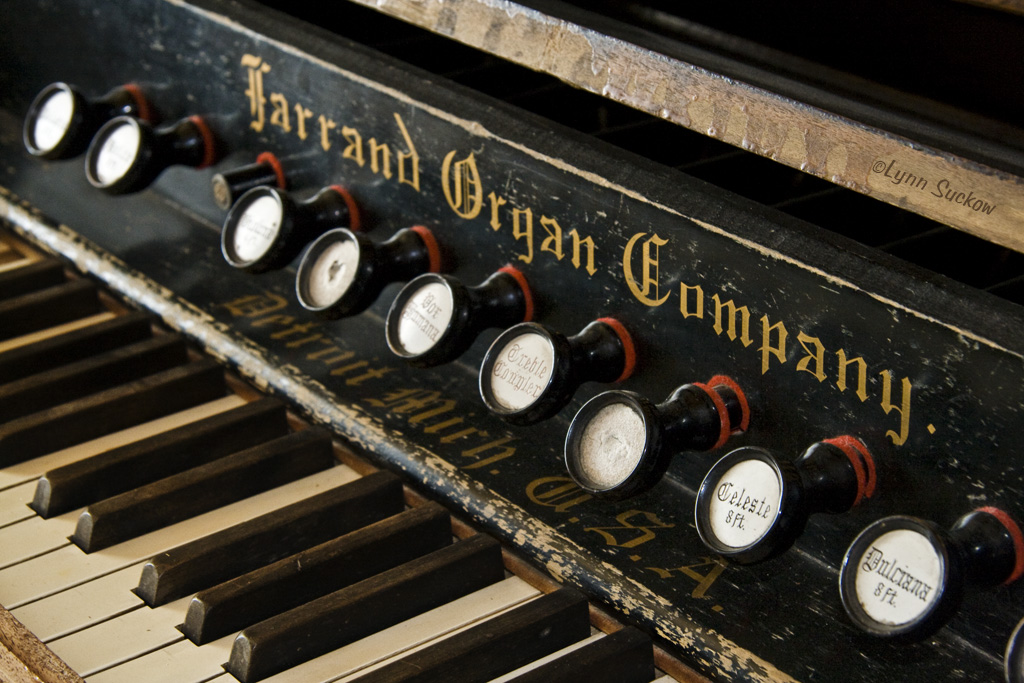
Farrand Organ Company reed organ

Farrand started his first full-time job, when he was 17 years old, as a clerk for the wholesale drug firm Farrand, Williams & Clark founded by his father. He later was promoted to a department manager and worked at that position until he was thirty years old. Farrand then bought an interest in the Whitney Organ Company in 1883 and became their treasurer. In 1887 C. J. Whitney, owner of the company, retired. In 1890, Farrand and Edwin S. Votey, an officer in the Whitney company, reorganized the firm as the Farrand & Votey Organ Company, which built both reed and pipe organs. Farrand became treasurer of this new firm. The factory was located in downtown Detroit at Twelfth Street and the main railroad depot.

The company split in 1897, with Farrand and Votey each specializing in their own type of organs with new firms. Farrand became president of Farrand Organ Company which specialized in manufacturing just reed organs. By 1905 his company employed over four hundred skilled workers manufacturing reed organs, pianos, and mechanical players. He established branch distribution centers in Detroit, Philadelphia, Paris, and London.

== Public service ==
Farrand was associated with the Republican Party. He was active in public service and first accepted an appointment on the public lighting commission under Mayor Hazen S. Pingree, serving three terms with the last as chairman of the commission. Farrand served as a member of the Detroit Board of Estimate in 1890-91 and in 1893 became the president of the association. In 1893, the Mayor of Detroit appointed him a member of the public lighting commission. Farrand became its president in 1897. He was a member of the Michigan legislature for several years and helped introduce certain bills.

He was a member of the Society of the Sons of the Revolution, the Detroit Golf Club, the Country Club, the Wilderness Club, and the Lake St. Clair Shooting & Fishing Club. Farrand was a longstanding member of the board of trustees of the Harper University Hospital. In 1892 he organized a company of young men who were known as the Farrand Guards, a military and social organization.

== Church ==
Farrand was an elder of the Detroit First Presbyterian church and a chairman of the Detroit Young Men's Christian Association. Farrand was a delegate to the Presbyterian general assembly at Pittsburgh, Pennsylvania, in 1895, and later at Denver, Colorado. He became the elected leader and president of the Presbyterian Brotherhood of America in 1906. He served as president of the Wayne County Sunday School Association and formed the Farrand Bible class in 1904 and that developed into the Young Business Men's club of the First Presbyterian church.

== Personal life ==
Farrand's great-grandfather was Lieutenant Bethuel Farrand, Sr. (1741-1794), who fought in the Revolutionary War. Farrand married Cora Belle Wallace in Philadelphia, Philadelphia, on October 4, 1876. She was a daughter of Dr. Perkins Wallace of Canton, Ohio. They had two children, Wallace Raynolds Farrand who died at six, and Rebekah Olive Farrand who married Lieutenant George C. Keleher of the 26th US Infantry. Cora died in Detroit on August 24, 1917. Farrand was taken seriously ill and hospitalized August 1, 1930. He died on August 15 at the age of 76 from heart disease.

== Sources ==
- Burton, Clarence Monroe (1922). City of Detroit, Michigan, 1701-1922, V.3. S. J. Clarke publishing Company. OCLC 832853149.
- Junchen, David L. (1985). Encyclopedia of the American theatre organ, V.1. Showcase Publications. ISBN 0917800028.
- Marquis, Albert (1908). The Book of Detroiters. A. N. Marquis & Company. OCLC 810044327.
- Moore, Charles (1915). History of Michigan;, V.3. The Lewis publishing company. OCLC 657081089.
