= Michigan–Notre Dame football rivalry =

American college football rivalry

Michigan–Notre Dame football series
- Michigan Wolverines Notre Dame Fighting Irish
- First meeting: November 23, 1887; Michigan 8, Notre Dame 0
- Latest meeting: October 26, 2019; Michigan 45, Notre Dame 14
- Next meeting: September 3, 2033, Ann Arbor
- Stadiums: Michigan Stadium; Ann Arbor, Michigan, U.S. Notre Dame Stadium; Notre Dame, Indiana, U.S.

Statistics
- Total meetings: 44 (Note: Notre Dame's win in 2012 was vacated as a result of NCAA sanctions against the Notre Dame football program issued on November 22, 2016, after the NCAA found that a student-trainer committed academic misconduct for two football players and provided six other players with impermissible academic extra benefits. The NCAA also rejected Notre Dame's appeal on February 13, 2018. This win is not included in Notre Dame's all-time record, nor is it counted in the series record between the two teams. See Wikipedia:WikiProject College football/Vacated victories for an explanation of how vacated victories are recorded.)
- All-time series: Michigan leads 25–17–1 (.593)
- Largest victory: Michigan, 38–0 (2007)
- Longest win streak: Michigan, 8 (1887–1908)
- Current win streak: Michigan, 1 (2019–present)

Locations of Michigan and Notre Dame

The Michigan–Notre Dame football rivalry is an American college football rivalry between the Michigan Wolverines and Notre Dame Fighting Irish.

The Michigan and Notre Dame football programs are among the most distinguished in college football. Both Michigan and Notre Dame appear on the all-time leaders in team wins. Michigan claims 12 national championships while Notre Dame claims 11, and both have more recognized by all NCAA selectors (Notre Dame 22; Michigan 19) Both schools are top producers of consensus All-Americans (Notre Dame 107; Michigan 87), and top producers of NFL draft selections (Notre Dame 522, Michigan 392).

Michigan is a member of the Big Ten Conference while Notre Dame football is independent. In 2013, Notre Dame joined the Atlantic Coast Conference in all sports except football and hockey, though the football team has played five ACC opponents each season since 2014. For the year 2020, Notre Dame did join the ACC Conference in football, but lost the title to conference champion Clemson. Notre Dame and Michigan initially reached a mutual agreement to suspend the series for the 2018 and 2019 football season. Notre Dame then decided to cancel the 2015 through 2017 games, citing the need to play ACC games. After a three-year hiatus, the series resumed in 2018 and 2019. The teams are scheduled to meet again in 2033 and 2034 after a 14-year hiatus.

== Summary ==
Notre Dame and Michigan first played on November 23, 1887, in Notre Dame's first football game in South Bend, Indiana. The Wolverines proceeded to win the first eight contests before Notre Dame notched its first win in the series in 1909. In 1942, in the first meeting since 1909, Michigan beat then #4 Notre Dame in Notre Dame Stadium. The next season on October 9, top-ranked Notre Dame defeated second-ranked Michigan in the first matchup of top teams since the creation of the AP Poll in 1936. The teams ceased to play each other until the series was renewed in 1978. It was played annually with the exception of hiatuses in 1983–84, 1995–96, and 2000–01 until after the 2014 meeting when the series again went on hiatus. However, the series was renewed in 2018 and 2019.

Michigan leads the all-time series 25–17*–1. The NCAA has vacated Notre Dame one win due to NCAA sanctions.

== Origins and early years ==
=== 1887: Former Notre Dame Students on Michigan's Football Team Encourage Notre Dame to Adopt Football ===
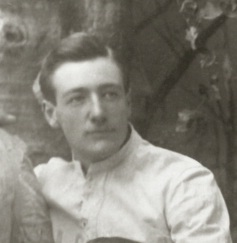
George DeHaven wrote to Brother Paul at Notre Dame in October 1887, describing the new game being played at Michigan.

The first game took place on November 23, 1887. Michigan had been playing football since May 30, 1879. Two players on Michigan's 1887 team, George Winthrop DeHaven Jr. and William Warren Harless, had previously attended Notre Dame. In October 1887, DeHaven wrote to Brother Paul, who ran Notre Dame's intramural athletics program, telling him about the new game of football. Michigan had planned a game in Chicago on Thanksgiving Day, and the three men, DeHaven, Harless and Brother Paul, persuaded their respective schools to play a football match on the Notre Dame campus on the day before Thanksgiving.

On November 22, 1887, the Michigan football team departed from the Michigan Central Railroad Depot in Ann Arbor on the late train. After breakfast in Niles, Michigan, the team changed trains and arrived in South Bend between 7:00 a.m. and 8:00 a.m. before busing to the campus. The team was greeted by Father Superior Walsh and spent two hours touring the university buildings and departments of Notre Dame.

The game was the first played by a Notre Dame football team, and the Michigan team was credited with teaching the Notre Dame team the game before play began. The Notre Dame student newspaper, Scholastic, reported: "It was not considered a match contest, as the home team had been organized only a few weeks, and the Michigan boys, the champions of the West, came more to instruct them in the points of the Rugby game than to win fresh laurels." The proceedings began with a tutorial session in which players from both teams were divided irrespective of college. For the first 30 minutes, the teams scrimmaged in a practice game with Michigan "exchanging six men for the same number from Notre Dame."

After the practice session, the Michigan and Notre Dame teams played a game that lasted only half an hour which was described by The Chronicle (a University of Michigan newspaper) as follows: "The grounds were in very poor condition for playing, being covered with snow in a melting condition, and the players could scarcely keep their feet. Some time had been spent in preliminary practice; the game began and after rolling and tumbling in the mud for half an hour time was finally called, the score standing 8 to 0 in favor of U. of M."

Between 400 and 500 students watched the game. After the game, the team ate at the Notre Dame dining hall. The Notre Dame student newspaper reported on the gratitude of Notre Dame officials for Michigan's tutorial in the game of football: "After a hearty dinner, Rev. President Walsh thanked the Ann Arbor team for their visit, and assured them of the cordial reception that would always await them at Notre Dame." Brother Paul arranged for carriages to take the team to Niles in time to catch the 3:00 train to Chicago. The Notre Dame paper reported: "At 1 o'clock carriages were taken for Niles, and amidst rousing cheers the University of Michigan football team departed, leaving behind them a most favorable impression."

=== 1888 games ===
After Michigan's visit to Notre Dame, Indiana, on November 23, 1887, football became a popular game on the Notre Dame campus. A football association was formed with Brother Paul as the president. In the spring of 1888, Brother Paul challenged Michigan to return to northern Indiana. Two games were scheduled for a weekend on April 20–21, 1888. On March 24, 1888, the Notre Dame student newspaper reported:

"Mr. DeHaven writes from Ann Arbor that the boys from the University of Michigan have such pleasant
remembrances of their Thanksgiving game here that they would like to play here again."

— The Scholastic newspaper report, March 27, 1888.

Michigan won the first game 26–6. The game was played at Green Stocking Ball Park before a crowd stated to be as low as 300 and as high as 800 spectators. Before the game was played, a 100-yard dash was run with players from both teams participating. Michigan's James E. Duffy defeated Harry Jewett, the American sprint champion, in the race. The game began at 3:20 p.m., and The Chronicle summarized the game as follows: "The feature of the game on our side was the tackling of Duffy, Harless, Babcock and Briggs, long runs and good passes by Rhodes, DeHaven, Wood, Ball and Button. As usual J. L. Duffy got in some good kicks."

The second game was played the next day, after the players were taken for a boat ride on St. Joseph's Lake. The game began at about 2:00 p.m. Michigan won 10–4. The spring games were a disappointment to some Michigan fans in that the Michigan football team had not allowed its opponents to score a single point since November 1883 – a span of more than four years. The Notre Dame team had scored 10 points in two games. DeHaven recalled that when the Michigan players returned to Ann Arbor, they were booed on their arrival: "It was a badly battered team that landed in the crowded Ann Arbor depot, and we received a proper razzing for breaking a four-year record." No Michigan football team returned to play at Notre Dame until 1942.

=== First hiatus ===
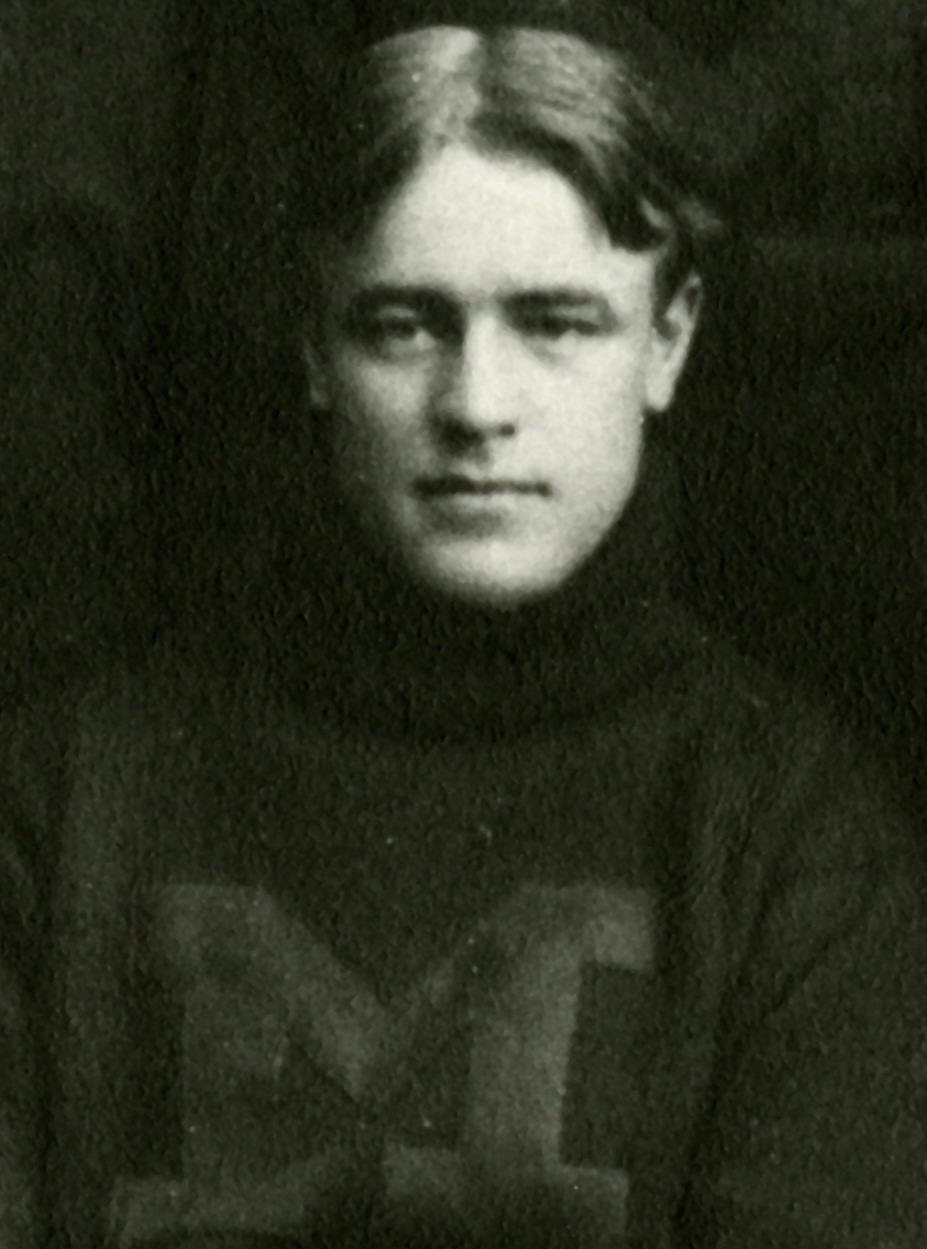
William Caley scored three touchdowns against Notre Dame when the schools resumed the rivalry in 1898.

After the three games played at Notre Dame in 1887 and 1888, Michigan and Notre Dame did not face each other on the football field for a decade.

=== 1898 to 1900 ===
Michigan and Notre Dame resumed the rivalry in 1898 playing three games between 1898 and 1900. Michigan won all three games by a combined score of 42 to 0.

The first game played in Ann Arbor between the Michigan and Notre Dame football teams occurred on October 22, 1898. The 1898 Michigan team was undefeated, won the school's first Western Conference championship, and inspired Louis Elbel to write Michigan's fight song, "The Victors". Michigan defeated Notre Dame, 23–0. The field was reported to be a "mudbath," which favored the Wolverines who played the game in long cleats. William Caley scored three touchdowns in the game. Notre Dame's highly touted 6-foot, 4-inch, 256-pound center, John Eggeman, was held in check by Michigan's backup center Harry Brown. The Chicago Daily Tribune reported: "Eggeman, the big center rush of the visitors, did not prove nearly so hard a proposition for Brown as was anticipated, and taken altogether the visitors' strength was considerably overestimated, if they played their game today." The Irish managed only one first down and lost five fumbles. Notre Dame halfback George Lins punched a Michigan player in frustration, claiming he had been held throughout the game by Michigan's quarterback. Notre Dame suspended Lins from the following week's game. At the end of the game, the biggest crowd of the season "rushed the players off the field in honor."

The teams played again at Regents Field in Ann Arbor in 1899, with Michigan winning the game 12–0. A newspaper account reported that Michigan's defense was generally good, and the team's overall performance against Notre Dame was "much superior" to that displayed in the prior week's game against Western Reserve. In 1900, Michigan prevailed 7–0. The Wolverines scored two points on a safety when Notre Dame's kicker missed the ball on an attempted punt from behind the goal line. Michigan scored its only touchdown on a series of "hard line bucks" after two minutes of play.

=== 1902: Notre Dame slows Yost's "Point-a-Minute" team ===
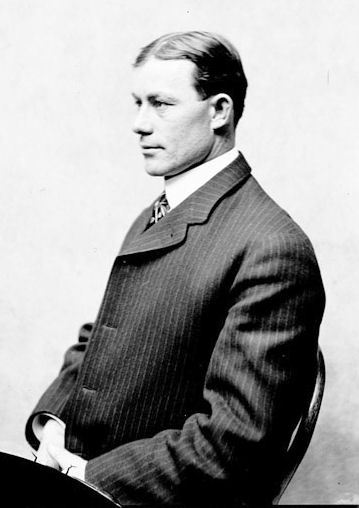
Fielding H. Yost in 1902

Fielding H. Yost took over as Michigan's coach in 1901. From 1901 to 1905, his "Point-a-Minute" squads (so named because they averaged a point for each minute of play) went 55–1–1, outscoring their opponents by a margin of 2,821 to 42. Michigan played Notre Dame only once during the "Point-a-Minute" year, on October 18, 1902, at a neutral site in Toledo, Ohio. The game was played on a slippery white clay field at Toledo's Armory Park following a night of rain. Michigan had been heavily favored to win, and betting on the game was 2 to 1 that Notre Dame would not score. Though favored to run up a high score, Michigan scored only one touchdown and led 5–0 at the end of the first half. While Michigan won the game 23–0, Notre Dame had slowed the "Point-a-Minute" offense that had scored 315 points (almost 80 points a game) in the first four games of the 1902 season. Michigan tackle Joe Maddock was the leading scorer in the game with 15 points on three touchdowns.

Although Notre Dame did not score on Michigan, its captain Louis J. Salmon demonstrated why he had earned "the reputation of being the hardest line bucker in the west." On one drive, Salmon took the ball to the Michigan 43-yard line in two attempts. After Notre Dame reached Michigan's 20-yard line, "Salmon went at it in the most vicious and determined manner to score. He took the ball eight times in succession but was finally held for downs on the 5-yard line." In the second half, Michigan's running game wore down the Notre Dame defense. Michigan scored three touchdowns in the second half, and Notre Dame did not move into Michigan territory. Michigan end Curtis Redden was ejected after an altercation with Lonnegan of Notre Dame, though Redden claimed Lonnegan had been the instigator. After the game, Yost said, "I am satisfied. The score is just about what I though it would be after I had taken a look at the field."

=== Second hiatus ===
After playing four games between 1898 and 1902, Michigan and Notre Dame did not schedule games over the next five seasons.

=== 1908 and 1909: Birth of the "Fighting Irish" ===
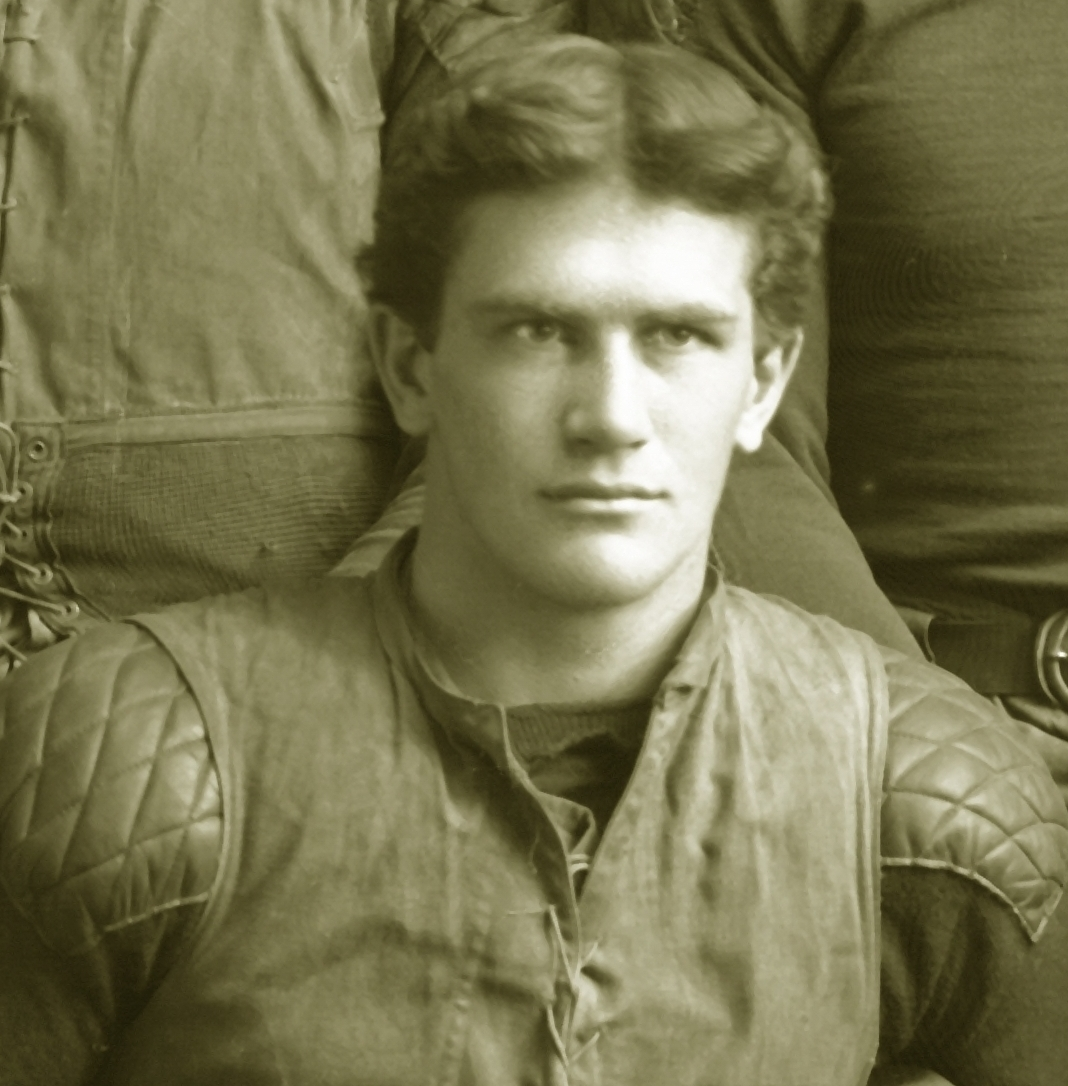
Former Michigan player Frank Longman led a band of "fighting Irishmen" to victory over the Wolverines in 1909.

For the first time in six years, Michigan and Notre Dame met in October 1908, with Michigan winning, 12–6, at Ann Arbor's Ferry Field. Dave Allerdice scored all 12 of Michigan's points on three field goals – two in the first half and one in the last minute of the game. Notre Dame fullback Vaughan scored the only touchdown of the game on a long run from the 50-yard line.

In November 1909, Notre Dame, coached by a former Michigan player in Frank Longman, defeated Michigan by a score of 11 to 3. The game was the ninth meeting in the rivalry, with Michigan having won the first eight games (five of them by shutouts) by a combined score of 121 to 16. The 1909 game gave birth to the "Fighting Irish" nickname. E. A. Batchelor, a sportswriter for the Detroit Free Press, submitted a report on the game with the headline: "'Shorty' Longman's Fighting Irishmen Humble the Wolverines to Tune of 11 to 3." Batchelor opened his report as follows:

"Eleven Fighting Irishman wrecked the Yost machine this afternoon. Three sons of Erin, individually and collectively representing the University of Notre Dame, not only beat the Michigan team, but dashed some of Michigan's greatest hopes and shattered Michigan's fairest dreams."

— Detroit Free Press report, November 7, 1909

Michigan football historian, John Kryk, later wrote: "With that flowery lead, E.A. Batchelor of the Detroit Free Press popularized a moniker Notre Dame teams would later come to embrace – and aptly summed up the greatest athletic achievement to that point in Notre Dame history." Kryk noted that, according to Notre Dame folklore, Batchelor had overheard a Notre Dame player trying to motivate his teammates at halftime by pleading, "What's the matter with you guys? You're all Irish and you're not fighting worth a lick."

=== Third hiatus ===
After Notre Dame defeated Michigan in 1909, the two teams were scheduled to rematch on November 5, 1910. Before the 1910 contest, Yost protested Notre Dame's intended use of two players (Philbrook and Dimmick) that he believed were ineligible and cancelled the 1910 meeting when Notre Dame did not bench the two players in question. Yost later refused to schedule Notre Dame for any later seasons, deepening the feud between Yost and Notre Dame coach Knute Rockne. After cancelling the series, Yost was instrumental in corralling together the member schools of the Western Conference (the current day Big Ten Conference), refusing entry to Notre Dame and suggesting that conference members should not schedule the Fighting Irish. As a result of the boycott by Midwest opponents, Notre Dame scheduled games against schools on the east coast and west coast, such as USC and Army, and did not play Michigan again until 1942.

=== 1942 and 1943 ===
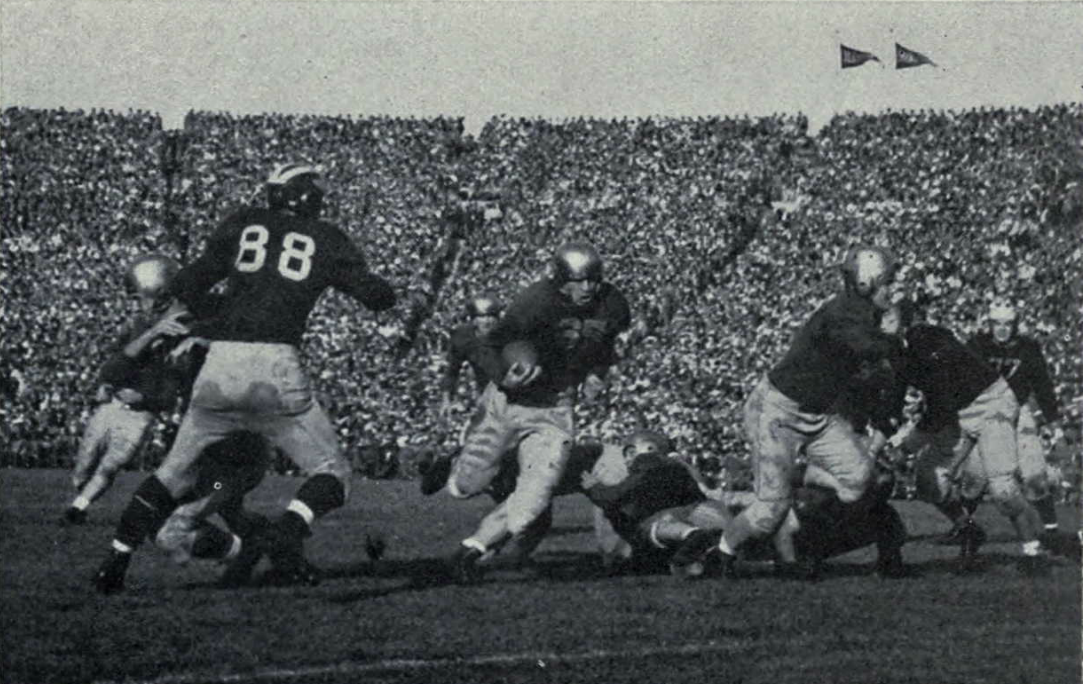
Creighton Miller "gets loose" against Michigan in 1943. (Photo from 1944 Michiganensian.)

After the long hiatus, Michigan athletic director and head coach Fritz Crisler arranged with Elmer Layden for two games to be played with Notre Dame during the 1942 and 1943 seasons. The 1942 game was played in South Bend and matched Michigan and Notre Dame teams ranked #4 and #6 in the AP Poll. The Wolverines defeated the Fighting Irish 32–20 in front of a capacity crowd of 57,500. Tom Kuzma scored two touchdowns for Michigan.

The 1943 game, played at Michigan Stadium, was the most anticipated game of the 1943 college football season. Notre Dame, coached by Frank Leahy and led by 1943 Heisman Trophy winner Angelo Bertelli, came into the game ranked #1 in the AP Poll with 53 first place votes. Michigan, with All-American Bill Daley and Elroy "Crazy-Legs" Hirsch in the backfield, came into the game ranked #2 receiving 36 first place votes. The game drew a record crowd of 85,688 spectators to Michigan Stadium. Michigan coach Fritz Crisler announced before the game that Elroy Hirsch was suffering from damaged knee ligaments and might not be able to play. Notre Dame won the game 35–12. According to the United Press game account, Bertelli's passing "caught the Wolverine secondary flatfooted and out of position repeatedly to make the rout complete." The third quarter was marked by a malfunction of the electric clock at Michigan Stadium, resulting in a quarter that lasted 23 minutes. In the Chicago Daily Tribune, Wilfrid Smith analogized to the 1927 Long Count Fight and wrote that the period "will be remembered as the 'long third quarter' of collegiate sport." After nine plays had been run in the fourth quarter, the timing error was discovered, and an announcement was made over the stadium's public address system that only two-and-a-half minutes remained in the game, as the fourth quarter was shortened to seven minutes. The only points in the short fourth quarter came on the last play of the game as Elroy Hirsch threw a 13-yard touchdown pass to Paul White. Notre Dame went on to win the 1943 national title, maintaining its #1 ranking in the AP Poll through the rest of the season.

=== 1947 national title dispute ===
Coaches of the 1947 Michigan and Notre Dame teams

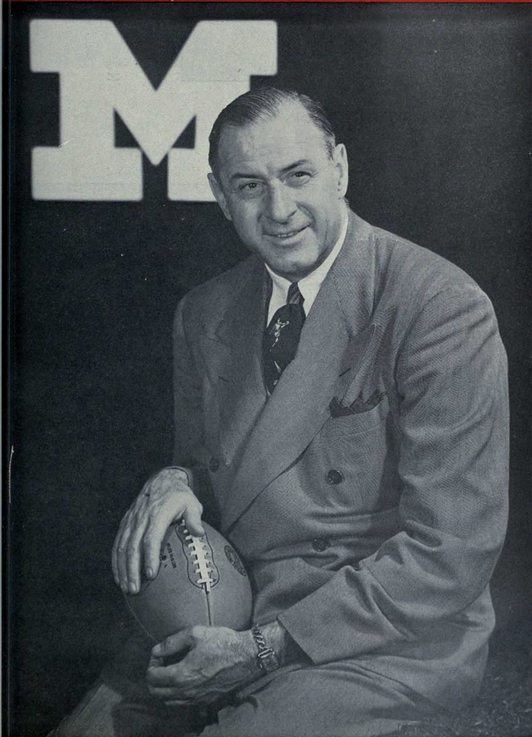
Fritz Crisler

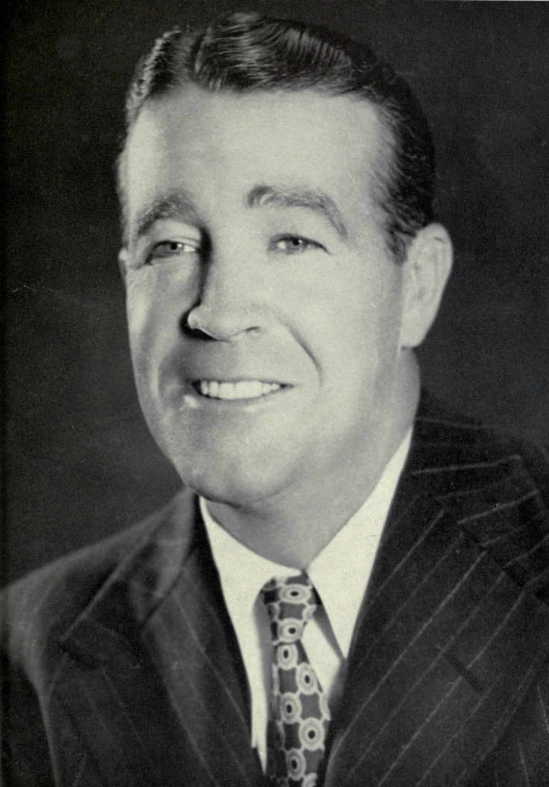
Frank Leahy

In 1947, Notre Dame and Michigan fielded undefeated teams that traded the top spot in the poll all year. Notre Dame was ranked No. 1 and Michigan No. 2 on October 6, October 27, November 3, November 10, November 24, December 1, and in the final poll on December 8. Michigan was ranked No. 1 and Notre Dame No. 2 on October 13, October 20, and November 17. After the final poll was released before the bowls, as was the custom in those days, Notre Dame was awarded the AP National Title and trophy, which the school still holds. Both schools were 9–0.

After the final AP Poll, Michigan went on to beat USC in the 1948 Rose Bowl, 49–0, a greater margin than Notre Dame's victory over USC (38–7) in the final game of the regular season. Michigan's 49-point victory was the largest margin of victory ever against a USC team and most points scored in Rose Bowl history. Football writer Pete Rozelle reported on the reaction of the assembled writers in the Rose Bowl press box. "From Grantland Rice down through the ranks of the nation's top sports writers assembled in the Rose Bowl press box yesterday there was nothing but glowing expletives for the synchronized Michigan Wolverine wrecking crew that powered over Southern California, 49–0. While for the most part hedging from a comparison of Michigan with Notre Dame, the consensus of the scribes was that the offensive-minded Ann Arbor squad deserved no less than a co-rating with the Irish as America's Number One Collegiate eleven." Grantland Rice, the dean of the nation's sports writers, wrote of Michigan: "It is the best all-around college football team I've seen this year. The backfield's brilliant passing and running skill gives Michigan the most powerful offense in the country."

Notre Dame supporters argued that the post-season AP poll was final and should not be revisited. They contended that Michigan had run up the score on USC, noted that Notre Dame had not had an opportunity to play in a bowl game, and asserted that Michigan and other Big Nine schools were unwilling to schedule Notre Dame in the regular season.

Detroit Free Press sports editor Lyall Smith argued the debate should be answered by comparing the two teams' performance against common opponents. Smith noted: "They played three common foes. Notre Dame beat Pitt, 40–6, a margin of 34 points: Michigan beat Pitt 59–0. Notre Dame defeated Northwestern, 26 to 19, a margin of seven points: Michigan beat the 'Cats 49 to 21, for a 28-point advantage. Notre Dame dropped USC, 36 to 7, in what Coach Frank Leahy termed his team's 'greatest game of the year,' while Michigan slaughtered the same Trojans, 49 to 0. Against those three common opponents the Irish scored 104 points to 32. Michigan's margin was 167 to 21." Smith also pointed to Michigan's strength of schedule: "The teams Michigan played won 42 games, lost 48 and tied five. Notre Dame's adversaries won only 30, lost 45, and tied 6."

In response to the debate over which team deserved to be recognized as the nation's best, the Associated Press decided to hold a post-bowl poll. The AP reported on the rationale for the special poll this way: "The Associated Press is polling sports editors of its member papers throughout the country to help settle the argument as to which is the better football team – Michigan or Notre Dame. The AP's final poll of the top ten teams, released Dec. 8 at the conclusion of the regulation season, resulted in Notre Dame winning first place with 1,410 points. Michigan was second with 1,289. . . . Returns so far received indicate that voting in this latest poll is likely to be the heaviest ever recorded." Another AP report indicated the special poll was "conducted by popular demand" to answer "the burning sports question of the day" and to do so "at the ballot box."

Michigan was voted No. 1 in the post-bowl poll by a vote of 226 to 119. The AP reported: "The nation's sports writers gave the final answer Tuesday to the raging controversy on the relative strength of the Notre Dame and Michigan football teams, and it was the Wolverines over the Irish by almost two to one — including those who saw both powerhouses perform.... In the over-all total, 226 writers in 48 states and the District of Columbia picked Michigan, 119 balloted for Notre Dame, and 12 called it a draw. Opinion of the 54 writers who saw both in action last fall coincided at almost the same ratio, with 33 giving the nod to Michigan, 17 to Notre Dame, and four voting for a tie." The 357 votes cast in the post-bowl poll represented "the largest ever to take part in such an AP voting."

Commenting on the special poll, Michigan coach Fritz Crisler said "the men who voted couldn't have made a mistake if they had picked either team." He described Notre Dame coach Frank Leahy as a "superb coach." Notre Dame President, Father John Cavanagh said, "We at Notre Dame feel grateful for the magnanimous statement of Coach Crisler. I listened to Michigan against Southern California and have only praise for the skill and accomplishment of your fine team."

Despite the magnanimous statements of Coach Crisler and Father Cavanagh, the reversed decision in the post-bowl poll only stoked the debate over which team was best. Said one columnist: "Hottest argument of the moment is the one over which had the better football team, Michigan or Notre Dame." Forty years later, the debate was still ongoing. In 1988, Michigan center Dan Dworsky noted: "Notre Dame still claims that national championship and so do we."

=== Fourth hiatus ===
After the 1943 game, 35 years elapsed before Notre Dame played Michigan in football, even though they competed against each other in other sports. During this time, Michigan coach Fritz Crisler attempted to organize another boycott of Notre Dame; this attempt was not as successful because Big Ten schools Michigan State and Purdue were determined to keep playing the Irish. A second attempt to organize a boycott of Notre Dame, alongside Yost's successful first attempt, further contributes to the bitterness of the rivalry.

== Notable games of the modern era ==
=== 1969: Canham and Krause reach agreement ===
In 1968, Don Canham became Michigan's athletic director in a year in which Michigan's average home attendance was 67,000, far below the stadium's capacity of 101,000. Canham pursued various ways to increase attendance at the stadium. Canham had been Michigan's track coach since the 1940s, and he was friends with Notre Dame athletic director Moose Krause. Canham and Krause met at a post-season banquet in December 1968. Krause suggested that a game between Michigan and Notre Dame was sure to sell out the big stadium. In January 1969, representatives of the schools met again and agreed to a four-game series to commence in 1978. Before the 1978 game was played, Canham and Krause agreed to extend the contract, scheduling six more game to be played from 1984 to 1989.

Michigan's new head coach, Bo Schembechler, was reportedly delighted at the chance to face his close friend and former mentor Ara Parseghian. Schembechler reportedly told Parseghian, "Ara, I'm gonna whip your ass!" Parseghian made what turned out to be a prophetic statement when he responded, "I'll be long gone by then." By the time the two teams squared off in 1978, both coaches were correct: Ara had indeed left Notre Dame and Dan Devine had taken his place and the Wolverines delivered a thorough "whipping," 28–14.

=== 1978: The "Reunion" game ===
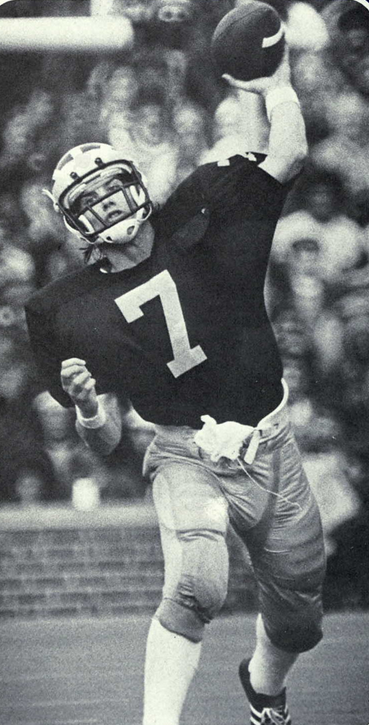
Rick Leach accounted for all four Michigan touchdowns in the "Reunion" game.

On September 23, 1978, the Irish and Wolverines met in South Bend for a game that Don Canham began promoting in 1971 as the "Reunion" game. The game matched defending national champion Notre Dame led by Joe Montana against a Michigan team led by Rick Leach and ranked #5 in the AP Poll. Notre Dame took a 14–7 lead at the half, scoring early in the first quarter after Russell Davis fumbled the ball at Michigan's 17-yard line. However, Michigan scored three unanswered touchdowns in the second half and won, 28–14. Rick Leach was the star of the game, accounting for all four Michigan touchdowns. Leach scored a rushing touchdown in the first half, but completed only 3 of 14 passes for 21 yards. In the second half, Leach completed 5 of 6 passes, with three of the passes going for touchdowns. For the Irish, Joe Montana completed 16 of 29 passes for 192 yards.

=== 1979 to 1982 ===
In 1979, the rivalry returned to Ann Arbor for the first time since 1943. In the season opener for both teams, Notre Dame upset #6 Michigan 12–10. Michigan dominated the game statistically with 306 yards of offense to 179 yards for Notre Dame. Notre Dame's scoring came on four field goals from walk-on place-kicker Chuck Male. The Wolverines led at the half, 10–6 and were shut down in the second half. Michigan had a chance to win with one second left, but a field goal attempt by Michigan's Bryan Virgil was blocked by linebacker Bob Crable, who ran onto the backs of offensive lineman Tim Foley and defensive end Scott Zettek. When reflecting on the game Crable said, "Thank God the guy kicked it straight on because I came over the center and he hit me in the left hip. I’m pretty sure it would have been good had it gotten through." A new rule was adopted the following season prohibiting this tactic. After the game, Michigan coach Bo Schembechler, said, "Our defense should have won the game." Tim Foley remarked, "It set Crable into Notre Dame immortality.” Notre Dame coach Dan Devine, whose team held Michigan to 94 yards in the second half, said, "Our defense rose to the occasion. We just asked the players to give a little more and dig down deep, and we asked 'Our Lady' to help us."

The 1980 contest matched #8 Notre Dame against #12 Michigan in South Bend. The game was a see-saw affair in which Notre Dame took a 14–0 lead, only to have Michigan erase it by halftime and go up 21–14 in the third quarter. John Wangler replaced Rich Hewlett at quarterback in the second quarter and threw three touchdown passes for Michigan. Anthony Carter returned the opening kickoff in the second half 67 yards. John Krimm's interception for a touchdown brought the Irish to within one, but Harry Oliver missed the extra point. The Irish scored again on a four-yard run by Phil Carter to take a 26–21 lead with 3:03 remaining in the game. Wangler led the Wolverines on a 78-yard touchdown drive that featured a 37-yard run by Butch Woolfolk to the Notre Dame four-yard line with 1:06 left and a one-yard touchdown pass from Wangler to Craig Dunaway. Michigan led 27–26 with 41 seconds left. With one last shot, freshman quarterback Blair Kiel led the Irish from their own 20-yard line into Michigan territory. With four seconds left on the clock, Oliver atoned for his earlier missed extra point by kicking a 51-yard field goal as time ran out for a 29–27 Irish victory.

==== 1981: Michigan 25, Notre Dame 7 ====
Dan Devine retired after the 1980 season and was succeeded by Gerry Faust. The 1981 season opened for #1 Michigan with a disastrous 21–14 loss to Wisconsin while the Irish made Faust's debut a memorable one with a 27–9 victory over LSU. The win propelled Notre Dame to the top spot in the polls as they traveled to Ann Arbor for a showdown with the Wolverines. It was no contest as Michigan romped, holding the Irish without a first down through the second and third quarters. For Faust, it was all downhill as the Irish tumbled to a final 5–6 mark, their first losing season since 1963.

==== 1982: Notre Dame 23, Michigan 17 ====
The 1982 contest was the first night game in Notre Dame Stadium history. Notre Dame's defense held Michigan to 41 rushing yards and despite a freak pass that was plucked off the back of an Irish defender and taken for a Wolverine touchdown, the Irish prevailed.

=== 1985 to 1994 ===
==== 1985: Michigan 20, Notre Dame 12 ====
After a two-year hiatus, the two teams met in the 1985 season opener. Faust's teams had struggled through four seasons of inconsistency and it was hoped that they would be able to put it all together this year. Michigan meanwhile was coming off its worst season under Bo Schembechler, a 6–6 campaign. Notre Dame led 9–3 at the half, but their inability to score touchdowns raised some eyebrows. Michigan took control in the second half and won, 20–12. Schembechler remarked afterwards that he expected much more from the Irish.

==== 1986: Michigan 24, Notre Dame 23 ====
Faust resigned at the end of the 1985 season and was succeeded by Lou Holtz. In the 1986 opener, the Irish did everything but beat the Wolverines. They never punted and amassed 455 yards of total offense as the Michigan defense, not knowing what to expect, was on its heels all afternoon. Several turnovers deep in Michigan territory proved costly for Notre Dame. Tight end Joel Williams caught an apparent touchdown pass in the back of the end zone, but was ruled out of bounds even though it appeared otherwise. Ultimately, it all came down to a field goal attempt. Unlike 1980, John Carney's attempt was off the mark and Michigan escaped with a 24–23 victory. Irish fans gave the team a standing ovation as the teams left the field and Notre Dame was voted #20 in the polls the following week, the first time a team had ever ascended into the Top 20 after a loss.

==== 1987: Notre Dame 26, Michigan 7 ====
Seven Wolverine turnovers proved to be the difference as Notre Dame parlayed them into 17 points.

==== 1988: Notre Dame 19, Michigan 17 ====
Ricky Watters' 81-yard punt return for a touchdown was the key play of the game. Notre Dame led at the half 13–0 and both of Michigan's touchdowns were set up by long kickoff returns. Reggie Ho was Notre Dame's unsung hero with four field goals, the last one coming with 1:13 left to put them up for good. Michigan had one last shot, but Mike Gillette missed a 48-yard attempt at the final gun.

==== 1989: Notre Dame 24, Michigan 19 ====
This was a memorable game for Irish fans, as Rocket Ismail returned two consecutive Michigan kickoffs for touchdowns. Notre Dame attempted only two passes the entire game which was played in the rain. Schembechler retired from coaching after the 1989 season and handpicked Gary Moeller as his successor.

==== 1990: Notre Dame 28, Michigan 24 ====
Notre Dame notched its fourth straight win over the Wolverines with a come-from-behind win. Trailing 24–14 in the third quarter, the Irish got a lucky bounce, or carom when an errant third down pass intended for Raghib Ismael found its way into the arms of receiver Lake Dawson and kept a scoring drive alive. Adrian Jarrell caught the winning touchdown late in the fourth quarter.

==== 1991: Michigan 24, Notre Dame 14 ====
Michigan kept possession for over 40 minutes and quarterback Elvis Grbac completed 20 of 22 passes, a record for a Notre Dame opponent. This game was notable for Desmond Howard's dramatic catch in the end zone on 4th down and 1.

==== 1992: Notre Dame 17, Michigan 17 ====
This game is remembered for Reggie Brooks scoring Notre Dame's first touchdown after being knocked out as he fell into the end zone. The Irish came back from a 17–7 deficit to salvage a tie.

==== 1993: Notre Dame 27, Michigan 23 ====
The Irish took a 27–10 lead in the third quarter and were poised to put the game out of reach when fullback Marc Edwards was stuffed on fourth and goal from the Michigan one-yard-line. Michigan then drove 99 yards for a touchdown and closed the gap to four with less than a minute to go before Notre Dame recovered an onside kick to preserve a 27–23 victory.

==== 1994: Michigan 26, Notre Dame 24 ====
A last-second field goal by Remy Hamilton enabled the Wolverines to escape with a victory.

=== 1997 to 1999 ===
==== 1997: Michigan 21, Notre Dame 14 ====
After another two-year hiatus, the two teams met again in 1997. By then Holtz had left Notre Dame and defensive coordinator Bob Davie was named head coach. Gary Moeller resigned after the 1994 season and was succeeded by Lloyd Carr. Notre Dame took a 14–7 halftime lead before the Wolverines tied the score and eventually took a 21–14 lead. In the fourth quarter, Notre Dame managed to recover three Wolverine fumbles deep in Michigan territory, but came away empty each time. Michigan would go undefeated and capture a share of the national championship that season.

==== 1998: Notre Dame 36, Michigan 20 ====
The Irish opened the 1998 season with their best game under Davie with an impressive 36–20 victory over the defending national champion Wolverines. It marked the most points the Irish had ever scored against Michigan. The Wolverines led at the half, but Notre Dame seized the momentum in the third quarter and won going away.

==== 1999: Michigan 26, Notre Dame 22 ====
Notre Dame took a 22–19 lead late in the fourth quarter but a controversial excessive celebration call on Notre Dame gave Michigan the ball near mid-field enabling the Wolverines to score a late TD to retake the lead, 26–22. Poor clock management proved costly for Notre Dame as the Irish, out of timeouts, drove frantically downfield only to have time run out when they could not get out of bounds.

=== 2002 to 2019 ===
==== 2002: Notre Dame 25, Michigan 23 ====
The two teams took another two-year hiatus in 2000 and 2001. By the time they met again in 2002, Bob Davie had been fired and Tyrone Willingham was named to succeed him. The teams turned the ball over a combined 8 times, including six lost fumbles. Even though Notre Dame would score its first offensive touchdowns of the year in this game, the defense once again proved its savior, as Shane Walton knocked away a 2-point conversion pass that would have tied the game with four minutes left. Walton would seal the game for good by intercepting Michigan's John Navarre in the final minute, and the Fighting Irish prevailed 25–23.

==== 2003: Michigan 38, Notre Dame 0 ====
Michigan notched the first shutout in the series since 1908, a 38–0 blowout. Running back Chris Perry scored four touchdowns, three of them on the ground.

==== 2004: Notre Dame 28, Michigan 20 ====
In 2004, the Irish, coming off a disappointing 20–17 loss to BYU, beat the Wolverines, 28–20. Freshman tailback Darius Walker rushed for 115 yards for the Irish with 2 TD's while Brady Quinn passed for another 2 TD's.

==== 2005: Notre Dame 17, Michigan 10 ====
Willingham was dismissed at the end of the 2004 season and was succeeded by Notre Dame alumnus Charlie Weis. In the 2005 contest, the Irish took a quick 14–0 lead as they drove impressively for touchdowns early. Michigan's defense stiffened and would only allow a field goal in the second half. The Wolverines managed to come to within a touchdown, but would not get any closer as Notre Dame prevailed, 17–10. Brady Quinn passed for 19–30 for 140 yards and 2 TD's to lead the Irish to victory.

==== 2006: Michigan 47, Notre Dame 21 ====
Michigan scored the most points (47) either team has scored in the history of the rivalry en route to a 47–21 win. Michigan receiver Mario Manningham caught three touchdowns in the first half to help the Wolverines.

==== 2007: Michigan 38, Notre Dame 0 ====
Both teams came into this game at 0–2 for the first time in the series' history. Michigan won a much needed game against a rebuilding Notre Dame team. The Wolverines' defense harassed Jimmy Clausen all game as the Irish offense struggled to get anything going. The victory helped propel Michigan to an 8–4 regular season and a victory in the Capital One Bowl against Florida, while Notre Dame finished 3–9.

==== 2008: Notre Dame 35, Michigan 17 ====
Notre Dame jumped out to a quick 21–0 lead on their home field and never looked back. Michigan tried to mount a comeback, closing the score to 28–17 before a Brian Smith fumble recovery and score ensured a 35–17 victory for the Irish. The Irish would capitalize on 6 Michigan turnovers in all. Michigan's program was transitioning to a new coach and offense, while Notre Dame was looking to rebound from a 3–9 season. Notre Dame finished 7–6 while Michigan finished 3–9.

==== 2009: Michigan 38, Notre Dame 34 ====
With Michigan trailing 34–31 with 16 seconds left, Wolverines quarterback Tate Forcier threw a touchdown pass with 11 seconds left on the clock to wideout Greg Mathews to seal a 38–34 comeback win for Michigan. This game set a record for the most total points in the history of the rivalry.

==== 2010: Michigan 28, Notre Dame 24 ====
Notre Dame came back from a 21–7 halftime deficit to take a 24–21 lead, but Michigan's Denard Robinson scored a 2-yard touchdown with 27 seconds left to give Michigan a 28–24 win. Robinson, a sophomore in his second career start, ran for 258 yards and two touchdowns while throwing for 244 yards with another touchdown.

==== 2011: Michigan 35, Notre Dame 31 ====
This time Michigan was the team to come back from a steep deficit. The Wolverines trailed 24–7 entering the fourth quarter and took a 28–24 lead with 1:12 left. Notre Dame scored a touchdown with 31 seconds left to take the lead 31–28, but Michigan's quarterback Denard Robinson drove the team 80 yards to score again with two seconds left. It was the latest point in a game that an opponent has scored a touchdown to beat Notre Dame.

Robinson ran for 108 yards and passed for 338 yards and four touchdowns. This was the first night game in the history of Michigan Stadium. A crowd of 114,804 was in attendance, setting a post-1948 NCAA collegiate football attendance record. (A 1927 Notre Dame – Southern California game at Soldier Field in Chicago, prior to NCAA record keeping for attendance, drew an estimated 117,000 – 123,000.)

==== 2012: Notre Dame 13, Michigan 6 ====
Notre Dame forced 6 turnovers–including 5 interceptions on 5 consecutive Michigan passes, plus a Denard Robinson fumble—and defeated Michigan 13–6 in a home night game. Senior Irish linebacker Manti Te'o collected two interceptions, while Irish QB Tommy Rees replaced starter Everett Golson and provided the game's only touchdown on a 2-yard run. Notre Dame was later forced to vacate this win due to NCAA sanctions.

==== 2013: Michigan 41, Notre Dame 30 ====
For Michigan, Devin Gardner scored 4 touchdowns passing, and scored once running. The game set a modern collegiate football attendance record of 115,109 people. The attendance record was later surpassed by the 2016 match-up between Tennessee and Virginia Tech in the Battle at Bristol.

==== 2014: Notre Dame 31, Michigan 0 ====
Everett Golson passed for 226 yards and 3 touchdowns while Cam McDaniel rushed for 25 yards and ran into the end zone once to lead Notre Dame to a 31–0 victory, ending what at the time was a record streak of 365 games without a shutout for Michigan and notching Notre Dame's first shutout of the rivalry. Notre Dame's defense harassed Michigan quarterback Devin Gardner all night long.

The game ended with a minor controversy over the final score. With seven seconds (:07) left in the game and Michigan trailing 31–0, Gardner made one last pass attempt. The pass was intercepted by Elijah Shumate and returned for a touchdown, appearing to make the final score 37–0. During the return, however, officials called a penalty on Notre Dame safety Max Redfield for blocking Gardner, negating the touchdown.

==== Controversy over cessation ====
On September 25, 2012, Notre Dame announced that it would exercise its option to end the rivalry after the 2014 season. Michigan head coach Brady Hoke took issue with Notre Dame's decision, going so far as to say Notre Dame was "chickening out". At the end of Michigan's 41–30 victory over Notre Dame on September 7, 2013, the speakers at Michigan Stadium loudly played "The Chicken Dance." However, on September 5, 2014, at Notre Dame Stadium, Notre Dame defeated Michigan 31–0 in the last scheduled meeting between these two schools (at the time). Just prior to the end of the game, the crowd began to chant "Na na na na... Na na na na... hey, hey, hey.... goodbye!"

This has since changed, as the two schools met in 2018 and 2019 in a home-and-home series, which began in week one on September 1, 2018, at Notre Dame Stadium in South Bend, with a Notre Dame victory 24–17. The series ended in Ann Arbor on October 26, 2019, with a 45–14 Michigan victory.

==== 2018: Notre Dame 24, Michigan 17 ====
Notre Dame's quarterback Brandon Wimbush guided his team to three first-half touchdowns while Notre Dame's defense kept Michigan's offense, which remained stagnant, out of the end zone until two minutes left in the fourth quarter.

==== 2019: Michigan 45, Notre Dame 14 ====
Michigan's 31-point victory marked its third-largest margin of victory against Notre Dame in series history. Michigan's defense held Notre Dame to 47 yards rushing on 31 carries, and 180 yards of total offense.

=== Future ===
On October 26, 2019, it was announced the teams would play a home-and-home series in 2033 and 2034.

== Game results ==
Michigan victories	Notre Dame victories	Tie games	Vacated wins

No.	Date	Location	Winner	Score
1	November 23, 1887	South Bend, IN	Michigan	8–0
2	April 20, 1888	South Bend, IN	Michigan	26–6
3	April 21, 1888	South Bend, IN	Michigan	10–4
4	October 22, 1898	Ann Arbor, MI	Michigan	23–0
5	October 18, 1899	Ann Arbor, MI	Michigan	12–0
6	November 17, 1900	Ann Arbor, MI	Michigan	7–0
7	October 18, 1902	Toledo, OH	Michigan	23–0
8	October 17, 1908	Ann Arbor, MI	Michigan	12–0
9	November 6, 1909	Ann Arbor, MI	Notre Dame	11–3
10	November 14, 1942	South Bend, IN	No. 6 Michigan	32–20
11	October 9, 1943	Ann Arbor, MI	No. 1 Notre Dame	35–12
12	September 23, 1978	South Bend, IN	No. 5 Michigan	28–14
13	September 15, 1979	Ann Arbor, MI	No. 9 Notre Dame	12–10
14	September 20, 1980	South Bend, IN	No. 8 Notre Dame	29–27
15	September 19, 1981	Ann Arbor, MI	No. 11 Michigan	25–7
16	September 18, 1982	South Bend, IN	No. 20 Notre Dame	23–17
17	September 14, 1985	Ann Arbor, MI	Michigan	20–12
18	September 13, 1986	South Bend, IN	No. 3 Michigan	24–23
19	September 12, 1987	Ann Arbor, MI	No. 16 Notre Dame	26–7
20	September 10, 1988	South Bend, IN	No. 13 Notre Dame	19–17
21	September 16, 1989	Ann Arbor, MI	No. 1 Notre Dame	24–19
22	September 15, 1990	South Bend, IN	No. 1 Notre Dame	28–24
23	September 14, 1991	Ann Arbor, MI	No. 3 Michigan	24–14

No.	Date	Location	Winner	Score
24	September 12, 1992	South Bend, IN	Tie	17–17
25	September 11, 1993	Ann Arbor, MI	No. 11 Notre Dame	27–23
26	September 10, 1994	South Bend, IN	No. 6 Michigan	26–24
27	September 27, 1997	Ann Arbor, MI	No. 6 Michigan	21–14
28	September 5, 1998	South Bend, IN	No. 22 Notre Dame	36–20
29	September 4, 1999	Ann Arbor, MI	No. 7 Michigan	26–22
30	September 14, 2002	South Bend, IN	No. 20 Notre Dame	25–23
31	September 13, 2003	Ann Arbor, MI	No. 5 Michigan	38–0
32	September 11, 2004	South Bend, IN	Notre Dame	28–20
33	September 10, 2005	Ann Arbor, MI	No. 20 Notre Dame	17–10
34	September 16, 2006	South Bend, IN	No. 11 Michigan	47–21
35	September 15, 2007	Ann Arbor, MI	Michigan	38–0
36	September 13, 2008	South Bend, IN	Notre Dame	35–17
37	September 12, 2009	Ann Arbor, MI	Michigan	38–34
38	September 11, 2010	South Bend, IN	Michigan	28–24
39	September 10, 2011	Ann Arbor, MI	Michigan	35–31
40	September 22, 2012	South Bend, IN	No. 11 Notre Dame^{†}	13–6
41	September 7, 2013	Ann Arbor, MI	No. 17 Michigan	41–30
42	September 6, 2014	South Bend, IN	No. 16 Notre Dame	31–0
43	September 1, 2018	South Bend, IN	No. 12 Notre Dame	24–17
44	October 26, 2019	Ann Arbor, MI	No. 19 Michigan	45–14
Series: Michigan leads 25–17–1
† Vacated by Notre Dame

== See also ==
- List of NCAA college football rivalry games
