= Henry Luhn =

American football player, coach, and physician (1867–1932)

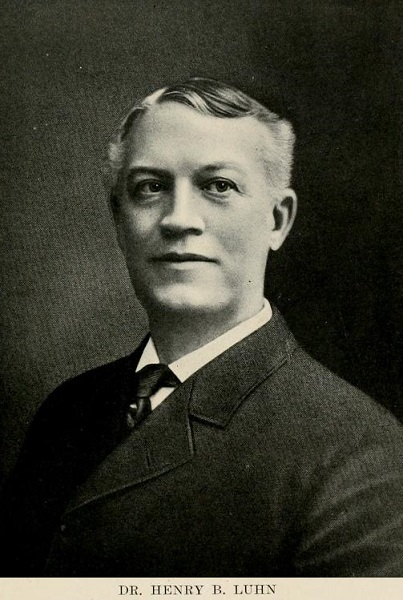

Biographical details
- Born: August 14, 1867; Brooklyn, New York, U.S.
- Died: February 10, 1932 (aged 64); Moscow, Idaho, U.S.
- Education: University of Notre Dame (1888)

Playing career
- 1887: Notre Dame
- Position: Halfback

Coaching career (HC unless noted)
- 1892–1898: Gonzaga

Head coaching record
- Overall: 7–0–2

Henry Bernard Luhn (August 14, 1867 – February 10, 1932) was an American college football player and coach and later a prominent physician in Spokane, Washington, from 1892 to 1932. He attended the University of Notre Dame, where he was captain of the first Notre Dame football team.

== Early years ==
Luhn was born August 14, 1867, in Brooklyn. He attended the preparatory program at Villanova University.

Luhn was one of six siblings, and one of two sons born to Major Gerhard L. Luhn and Catherine A. Oltmans. Gerhard had a distinguished career in the United States Army, serving for over 40 years from 1852 to 1895. He fought in the "Mormon War" of 1858, against Sioux Native Americans in the 1870s, and most notably served under General George McClellan in the Battle of Bull Run, Battle of Gettysburg, and the Battle of Antietam during the American Civil War. He was also present at the surrender of General Lee after the Battle of Appomattox Courthouse. He served as first lieutenant throughout the duration of the war and retired as a captain in 1895, but was promoted to Major through a special act of Congress in 1904. Catherine Ann Von Oltmans was the daughter of a prominent Holland family, and her father founded the Williamsburgh Savings Bank in Brooklyn, New York. Henry's younger brother, William L. Luhn, fought in the Spanish-American and Philippine-American Wars in 1898. He served as a lieutenant colonel during the war and was promoted to captain of the Tenth Cavalry of the United States in 1908.

== Notre Dame ==
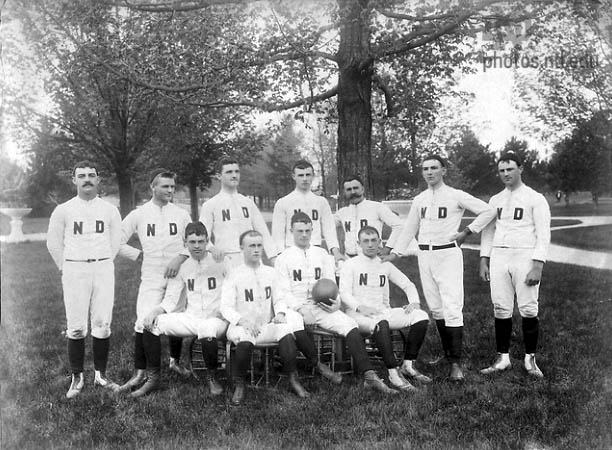
Captain Luhn, sitting center right

While Luhn's most publicized role was as captain of the first Notre Dame football team, a position which he held in both the fall and spring seasons, he also played a crucial role in establishing the team itself. In March, 1887, Luhn arranged an interest meeting of possible members for the new football team, and fifteen students met in Brownson Hall to discuss his proposal.

He is officially credited with participating in three varsity contests with the football team, all three being losses to the University of Michigan during the 1887–1888 academic year.

In addition to football, Luhn also participated on the Notre Dame crew and baseball teams.

In 1924, Luhn and the rest of the inaugural football team returned to Notre Dame for their homecoming day game against the Georgia Tech Golden Tornadoes.

== Gonzaga ==
Upon arriving in Spokane in 1891, Luhn enjoyed a brief stint at Gonzaga University, where he established the football program there, and served as their first head coach from 1892 to 1898. He led the Gonzaga "Blue and Whites" in their first game, a 4–4 tie against the Spokane Amateur Athletic Club.

== Later years and death ==
After graduating from Notre Dame, Luhn was accepted into the Medical School at Penn University. He graduated in 1891 at the age of 23, and began his career the following year as a physician-surgeon in Spokane, Washington, where he practiced until his death. In 1923 he was elected as the second VP of the Northern Pacific Surgical Association.

In December 1931, Henry and his wife were in a serious car accident. They both received grave injuries from the crash, and contracted influenza. Luhn died suddenly of the disease on February 10, 1932.

== Head coaching record ==
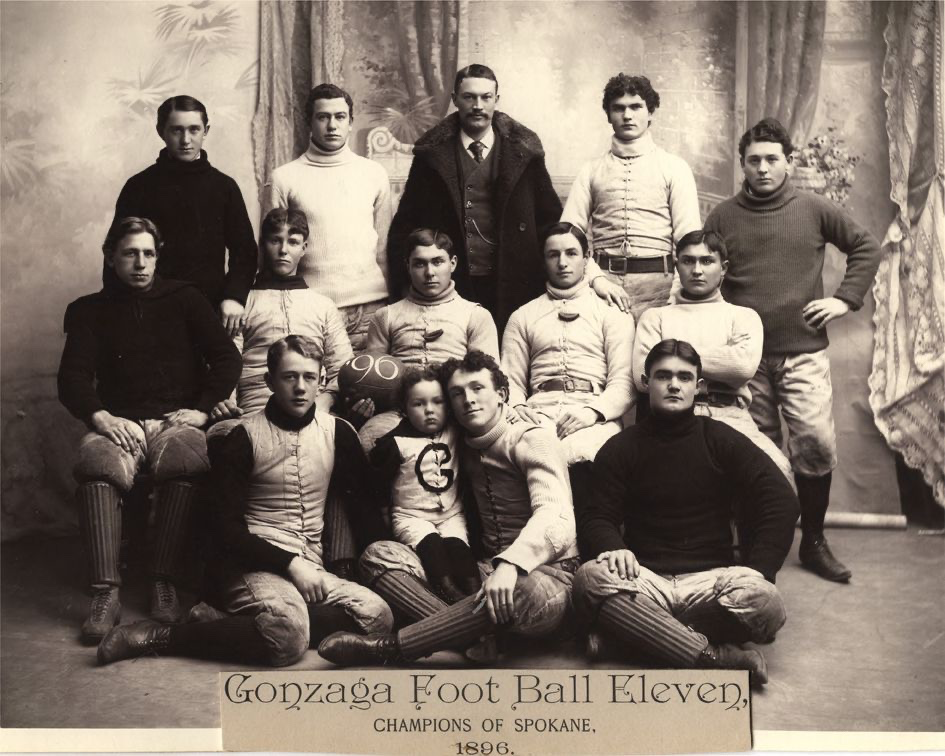
Coach Luhn, standing center rear with members of the 1896 Gonzaga football team

Year	Team	Overall	Conference	Standing	Bowl/playoffs
Gonzaga (Independent) (1892–1898)
1892	Gonzaga	0–0–1			
1893	Gonzaga	1–0			
1894	No team				
1895	No team				
1896	Gonzaga	2–0			
1897	Gonzaga	3–0			
1898	Gonzaga	1–0–1			
Gonzaga:		7–0–2			
Total:		7–0–2			
