= Cobbins =

Cobbins is a surname. Notable people with the surname include:

- Chris Cobbins (born 1984), American musician
- Lyron Cobbins (born 1974), American football player
- Michael Cobbins (born 1992), American basketball player

== See also ==
- Cobbins Brook, a river of Essex, England
- Hobbins
