= List of Notre Dame Fighting Irish football captains =

Since 1887, 254 Notre Dame Fighting Irish football players have earned the distinction of team captain.

Henry Luhn established the role of football captain in 1887, followed by the first two-year captain in Edward Prudhomme.

There are 29 players who have earned the distinction of captain twice: Edward Prudhomme (1888–89); Frank Keough (1893–94); Louis "Red" Salmon (1902–03); Leonard Bahan (1918–19); Pat Filley (1943–44); Bob Olson (1968–69); Willie Fry (1976–77); Bob Crable (1980–81); Phil Carter (1981–82); Ned Bolcar (1988–89); Ryan Leahy (1994–95); Ron Powlus (1996–97); Grant Irons (2000–01); Brady Quinn (2005–06); Travis Thomas (2006–07); Tom Zbikowski (2006–07); Maurice Crum Jr. (2007–08); Zack Martin (2012–13); Sheldon Day (2014–15); Nick Martin (2014–15); Mike McGlinchey (2016–17); Drue Tranquill (2017–18); Ian Book (2019–20); Robert Hainsey (2019–20); Avery Davis (2021–22); Jarrett Patterson (2021–22); JD Bertrand (2022–23); Drayk Bowen (2025–26); Adon Shuler (2025–26).

Jack Mullen is the only Notre Dame player to be chosen as team captain three times, leading the Fighting Irish from 1897 through the 1899 season.

The first duo-captains were Gene "Red" Edwards and Tom Hearden during the 1926 season, and the first trio was chosen in 1973 with Dave Casper, Frank Pomarico, and Mike Townsend. The number of captains per season has increased steadily since the 1967 season, and the current record was eight in 2017. The last solo captain was Harrison Smith in 2011.

Four captains late became head coaches for the Fighting Irish football team. These men were Frank Hering (1896–98), Louis "Red" Salmon (1904), Knute Rockne (1918–30), and Hugh Devore (1945, 1963).

Many of the captains have also received other honors during their collegiate careers. The list includes at least seventy-seven players who were selected to All-America teams, twenty-five consensus All-Americans, and seven that were selected unanimously. Nineteen have been enshrined in the College Football Hall of Fame. A collection of other awards, the Lombardi (5), Maxwell (4), UPI Lineman of the year (4), Outland (3), Unitas (2), SN Player of the Year, Jim Parker, Sammy Baugh, John Mackay, Bronko Nagurski, Lott, Butkus, Bednarick, Walter Camp, and Wuerffel have also been won at least once.

Nine captains have been finalists for the Heisman Trophy a combined eleven times, including Allen Pinkett in 1983 (16th), Walt Patulski in 1971 (9th), Ian Book in 2020 (9th), Allen Pinkett in 1985 (8th), Frank Dancewicz in 1945 (6th), Ross Browner in 1977 (5th), Vagas Ferguson in 1979 (5th), Tom Clements in 1974 (4th), Tony Rice in 1989 (4th), Brady Quinn in 2005 (4th) and 2006 (3rd), and Manti Te'o in 2012 (2nd). Leon Hart finished atop the rankings in 1949 and became the only captain to win the Heisman.

There were at least four captains who were chosen by their peers to represent the Fighting Irish in the next football season, but were unable to perform their duty for a variety of reasons. Bill Walsh was elected to the distinction in 1896 after leading the Irish as starting quarterback in the previous season, but turned it down to enter Georgetown Law School. George Gipp was originally elected to be captain of the football team in 1920, but Knute Rockne suspended him in March because of what he stated as missing too many classes, while other reports speculated that he had been caught at an off-limits nightclub. In March 1935, captain-elect Joe Sullivan died of pneumonia, and as a result no captain acting in any capacity represented the Irish on the field that season. Moreover, an award in his name was donated by the Notre Dame club of New York to the interhall football program to serve as their season's championship trophy. Bill Smith was intended to become captain of the 1936 team, but was forced to drop football after a doctor deemed him unfit to play, with John Lautar filling his place as an acting captain. Of the four, only Smith and Sullivan are given recognition on the official list of Notre Dame captains, although a footnote below each season explains their unique circumstances.

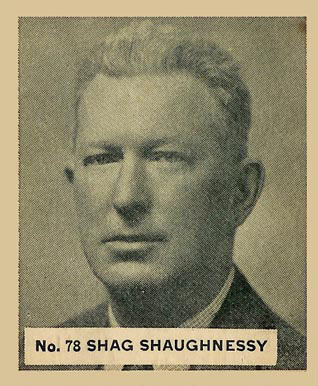
Frank Shaugnessy, 1904 captain. He was also inducted into the Canadian football and baseball Halls of Fame.

Dom Callicrate, 1907 captain.

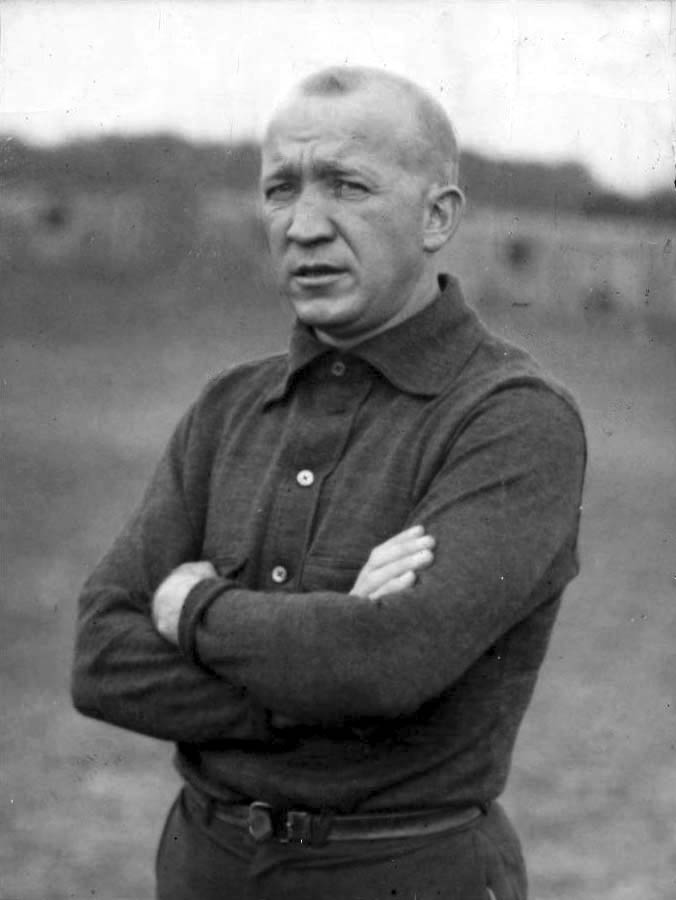
Knute Rockne, 1913 captain. He would become one of the most renowned coaches of all time, and still holds the highest win percentage of any major college football coach (.881).

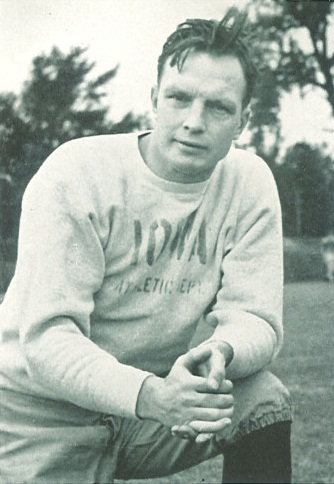
Eddie Anderson, 1921 captain.

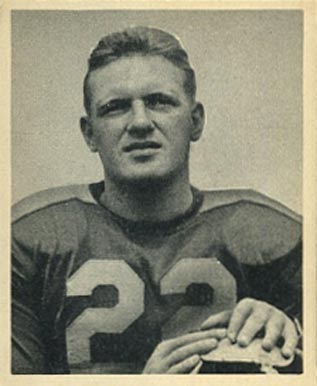
Frank Dancewicz, 1945 captain. He was the first overall pick in the 1946 NFL draft.

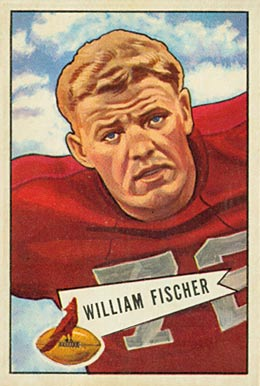
Bill Fischer, 1948 captain. He equaled George Connor's college distinctions with the same number of consensus All-American honors (1947–1948) and national championships (1946–1947). He also won the Outland Trophy in 1948 and was also enshrined in the College Football Hall of Fame

"Jungle Jim" Martin, 1950 captain. He won three national championships at Notre Dame in 1946, 1947, and 1949, and then won four in the NFL (1950, 1952, 1953, 1957).

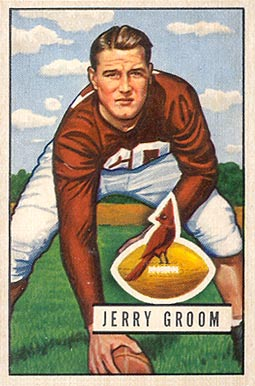
Jerry Groom, 1950 captain.

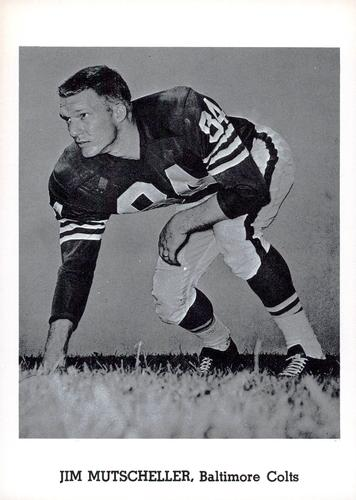
Jim Mutscheller, 1951 captain. He won one national championship at Notre Dame in 1949 and two in the NFL in 1958 and 1959. He was the first captain not to be enshrined in the College Football Hall of Fame since Frank Dancewicz in 1945.

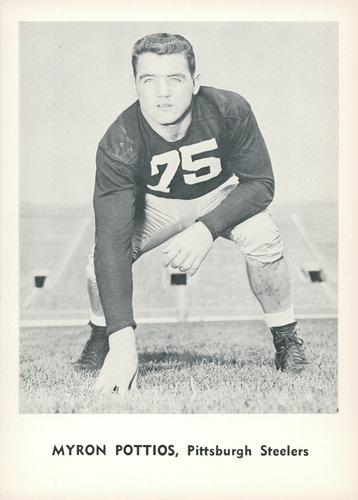
Myron Pottios, 1960 captain.

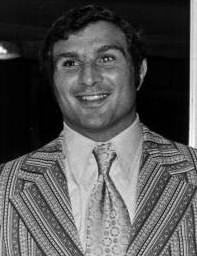
Nick Buoniconti, 1961 captain. He was the first captain to win a Super Bowl, winning the VII and VIII championships.

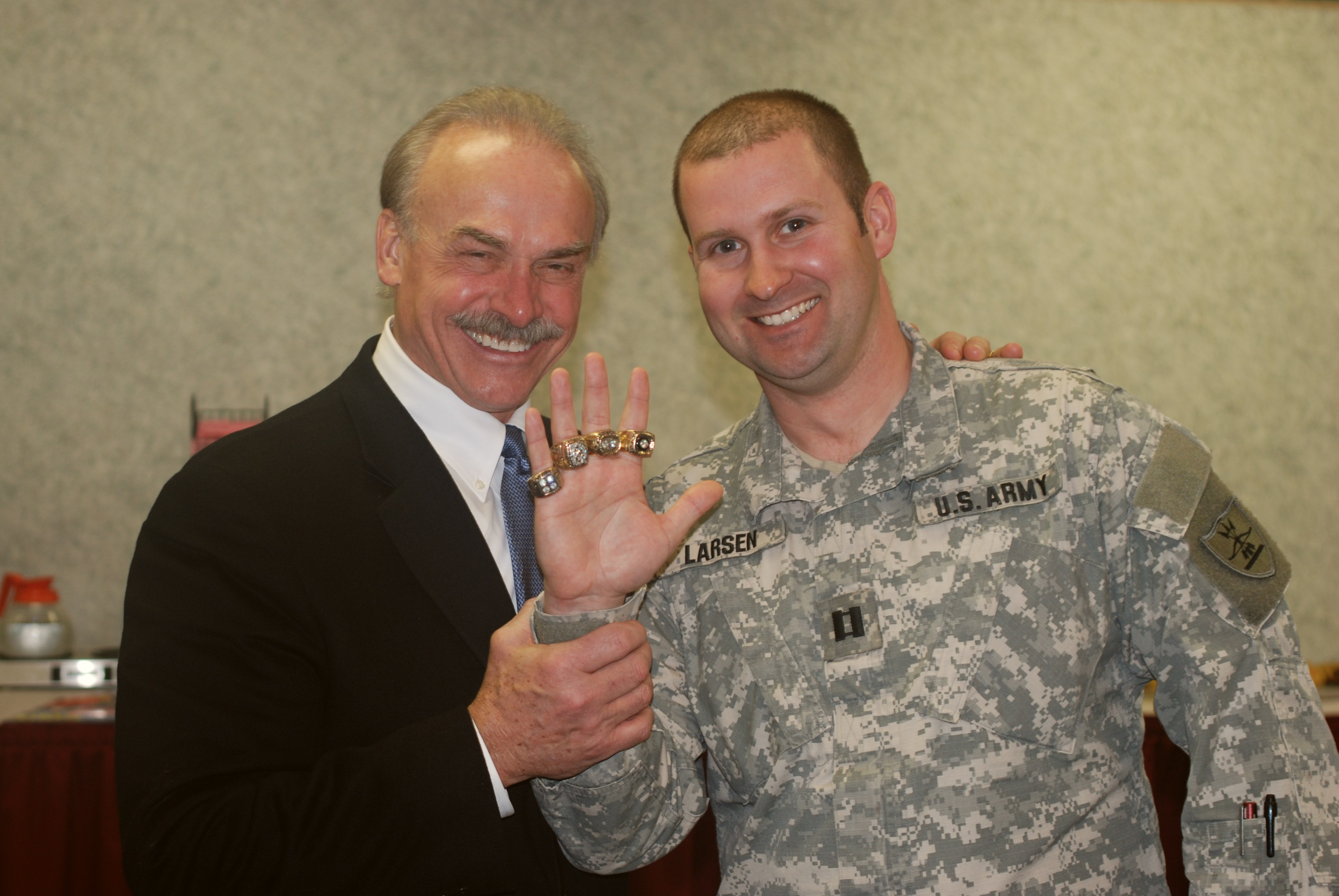
Rocky Bleier (left), 1967 captain. He won a national championship with the Fighting Irish in 1966, and then won four Super Bowls (IX, X, XIII, XIV).

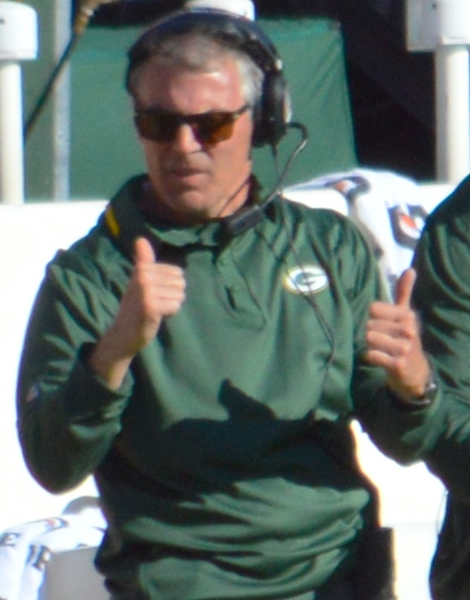
Tom Clements, 1973 captain. He was the first captain to win an NCAA football, CFL, and NFL championship, doing the first two as a player and the last as a coach in 2010.

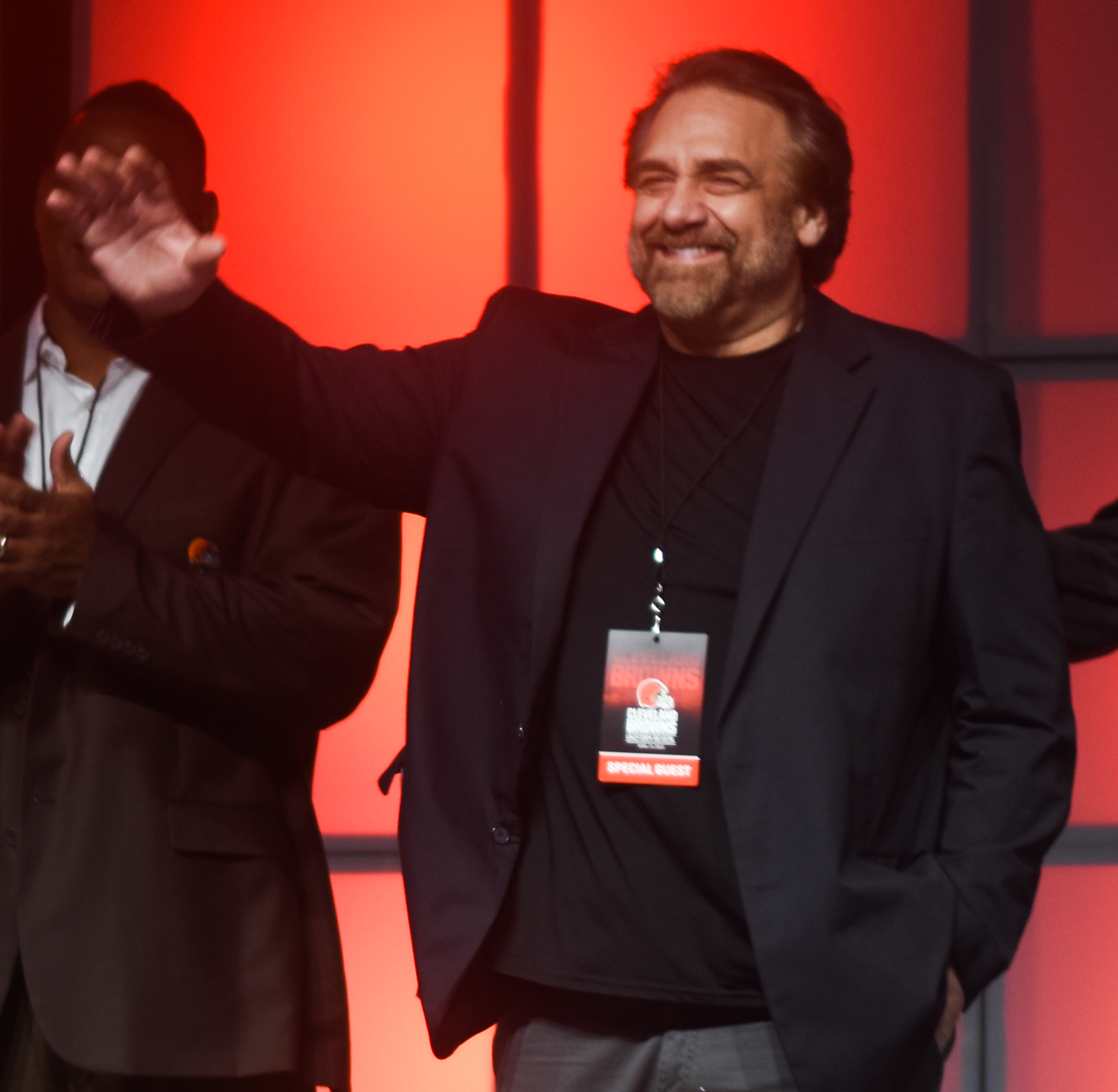
Bob Golic, 1978 captain. After a successful college and pro career, Golic would pursue acting and would become a long-standing radio host over various stations, many of which complimented Notre Dame.

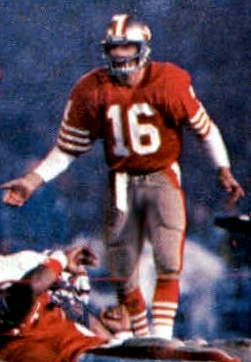
Joe Montana, 1978 captain. The "Comeback Kid" has become one of the most successful pro quarterbacks of all time, winning four Super Bowls, three Super Bowl MVPs, and numerous selections for All-Pro and Pro Bowl teams.

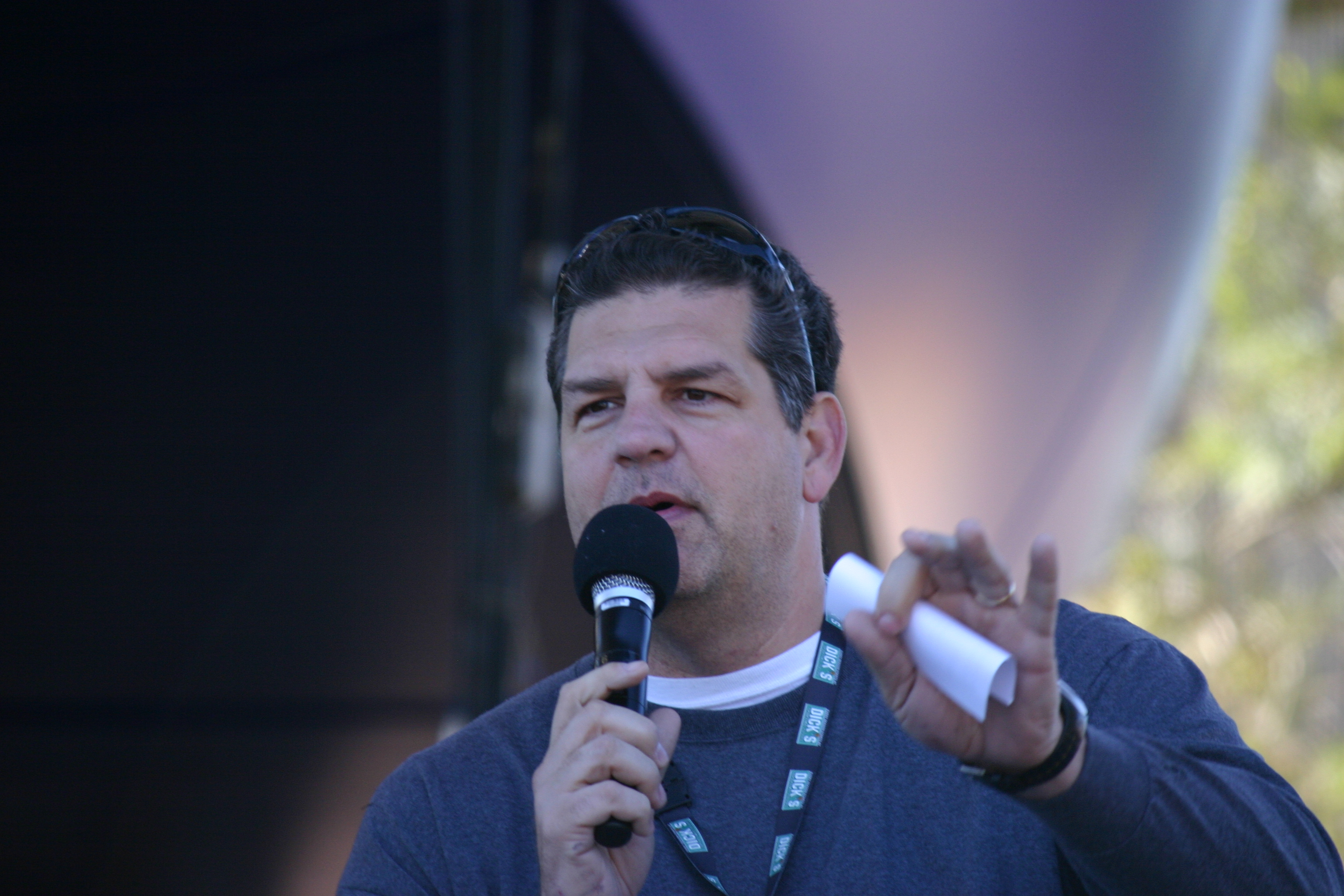
Mike Golic, 1984 captain. He was the younger brother of 1978 captain Bob Golic, and was inducted into the National Wrestling Hall of Fame in 2015.

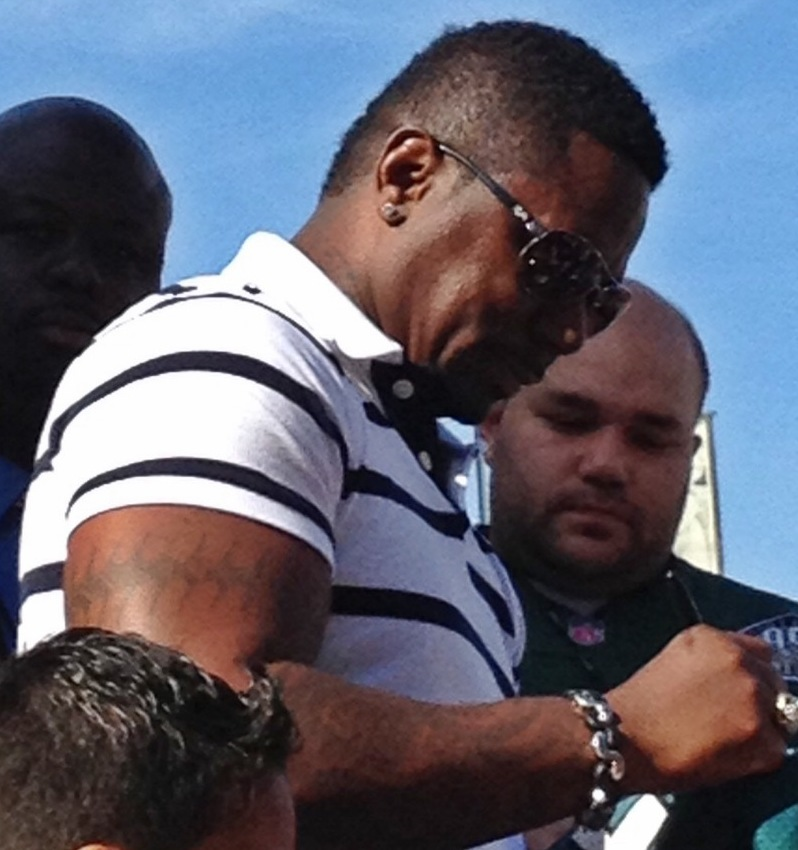
Ricky Waters, captain. He is possibly best known for his, and teammate Tony Brooks, infamous suspensions by Lou Holtz for disciplinary reasons prior to the biggest game of the 1988 season against No. 2 USC. The Fighting Irish would crush the Trojans 27–10 before defeating No. 3 West Virginia to win the national championship.

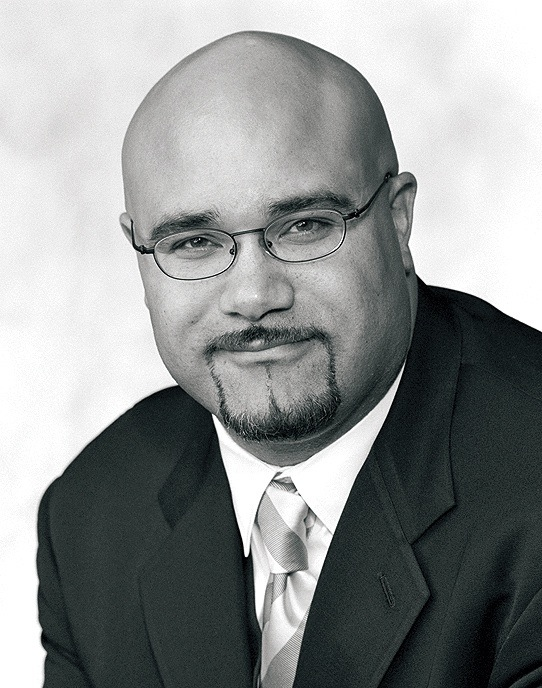
Chris Zorich, 1990 captain. He was the first captain to win AA, Consensus AA, and Unanimous AA honors, all in consecutive seasons.

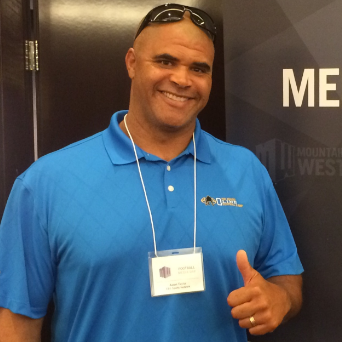
Aaron Taylor, 1993 captain. He founded the Joe Moore Award in 2015 to recognize the best offensive line unit in college football.

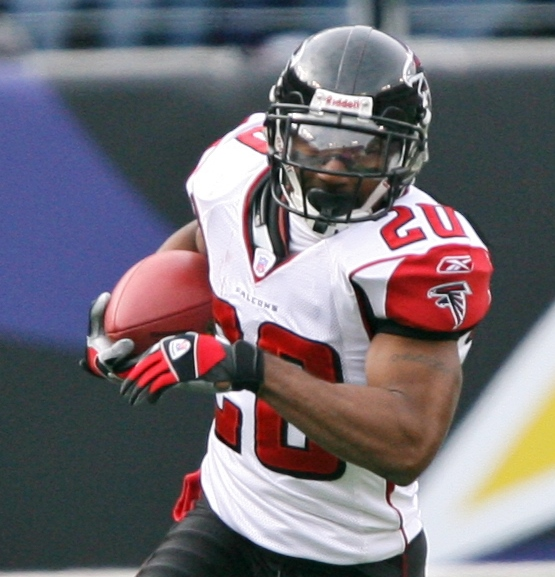
Allen Rossum, 1997 captain. He has two All-American distinctions in his notable track and field career.

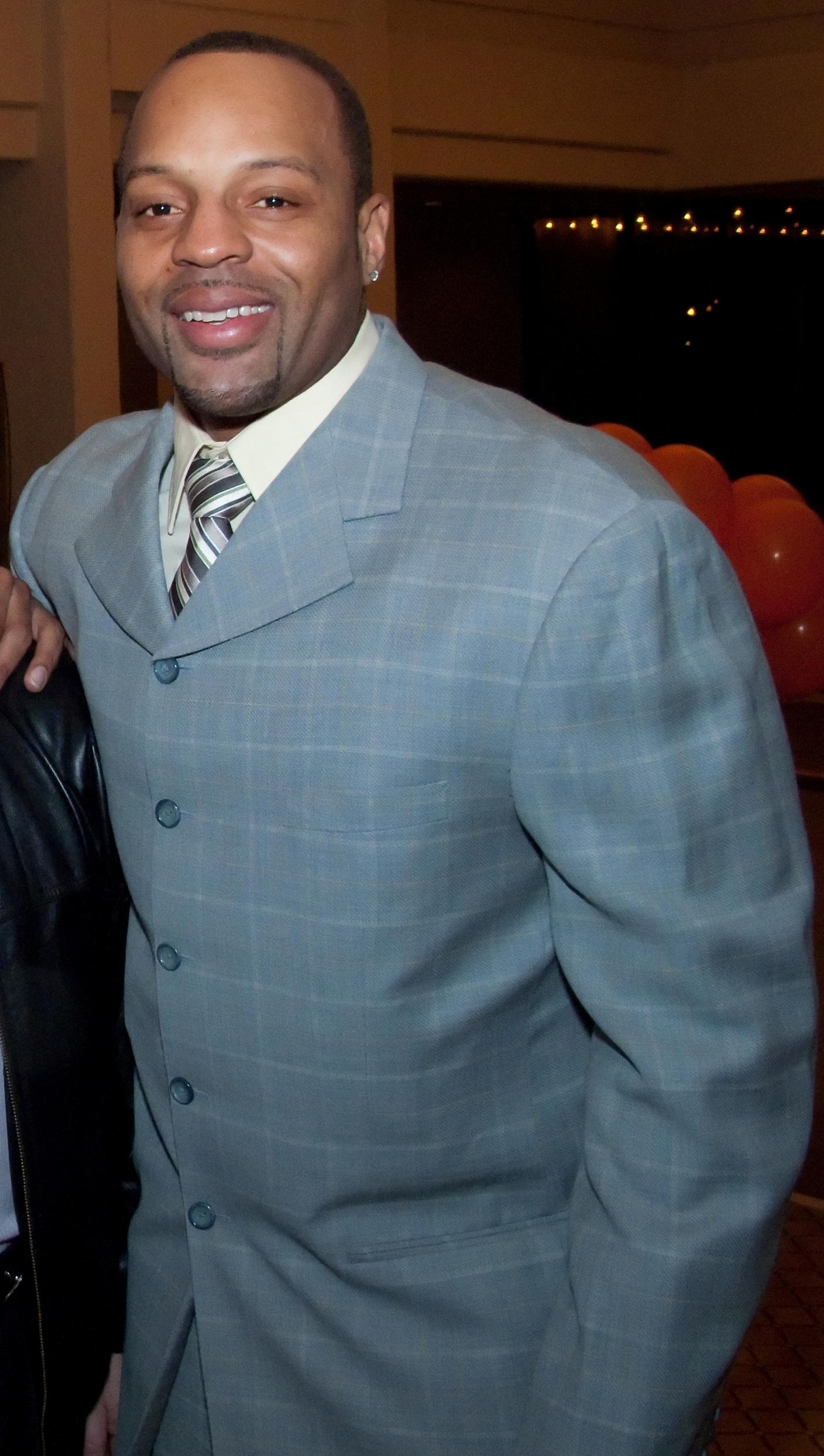
Jarious Jackson, 1999 captain. He broke many yardage record while at Notre Dame (records which were all surpassed by Brady Quinn), and went on to win four Grey Cups in the CFL.

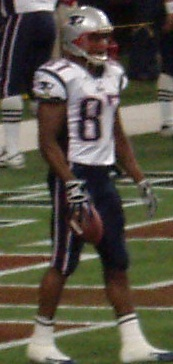
David Givens, 2001 captain. He won two Super Bowls with the New England Patriots and Tennessee Titans.

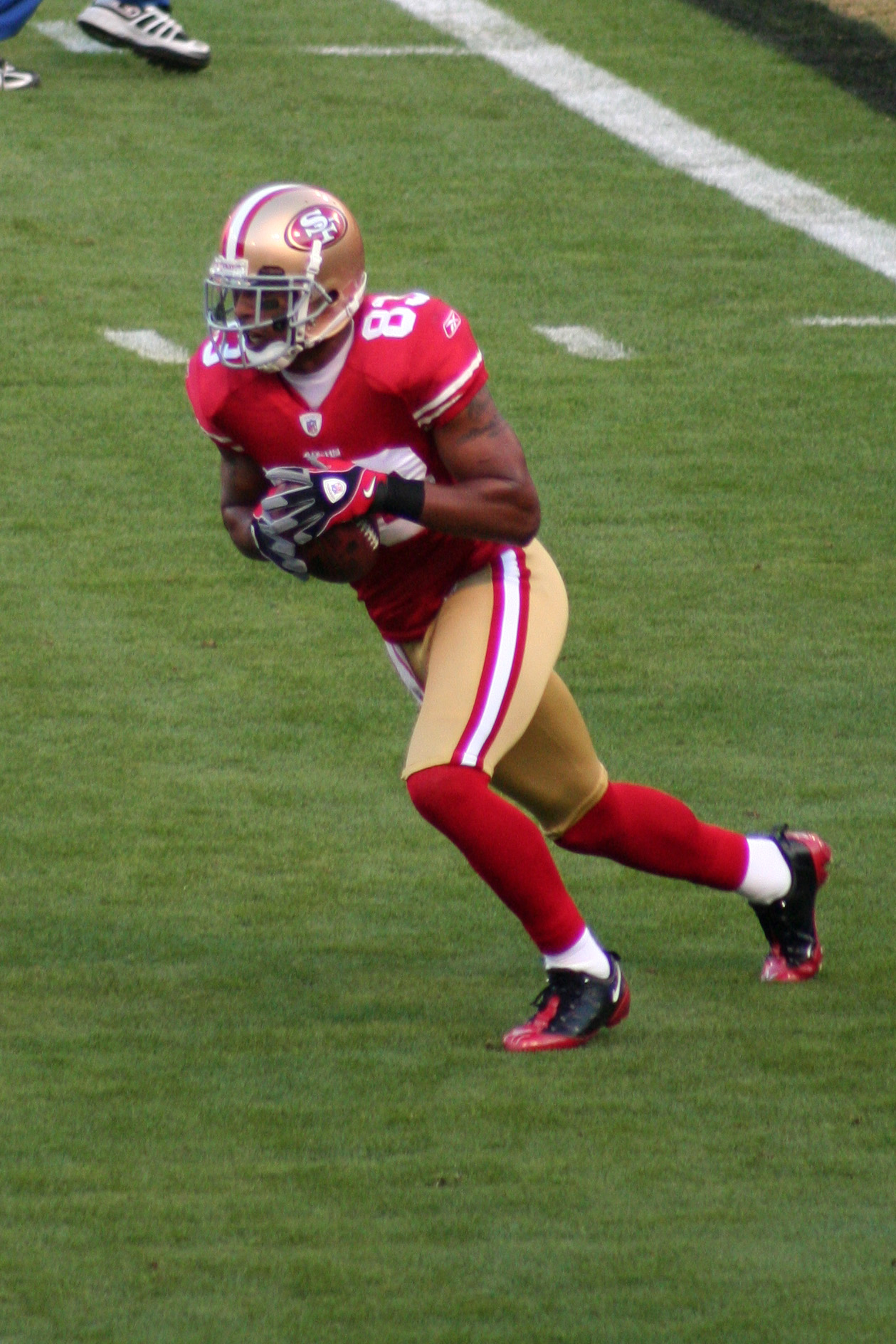
Arnez Battle, 2002 captain.

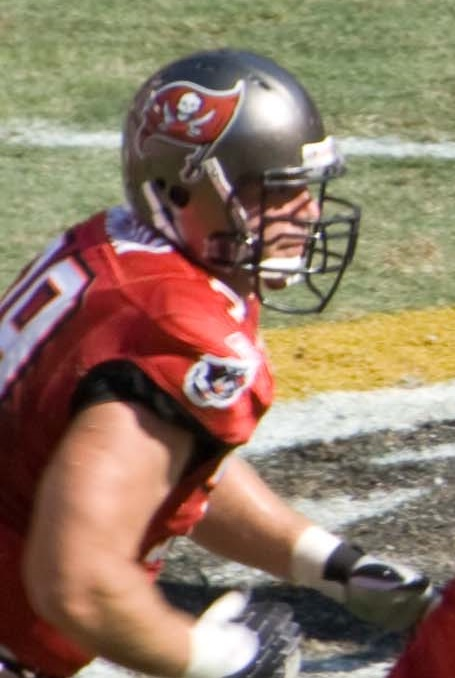
Sean Mahan, 2002 captain.

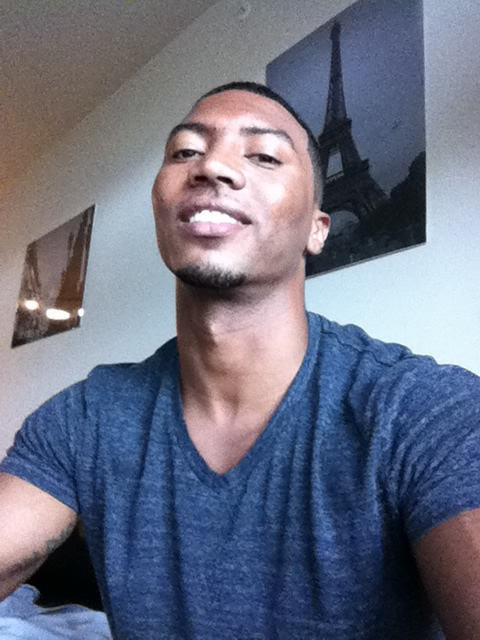
Gerome Sapp, 2002 captain.

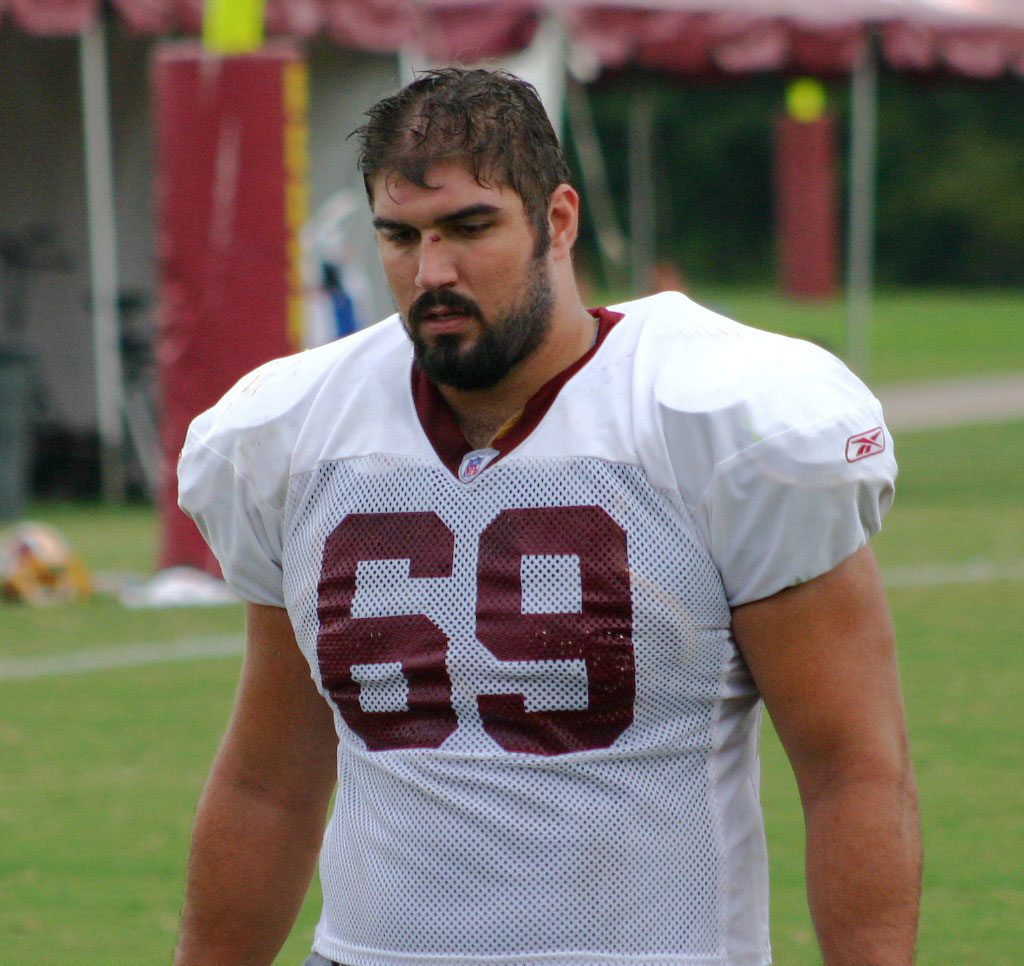
Jim Molinaro, 2003 captain.

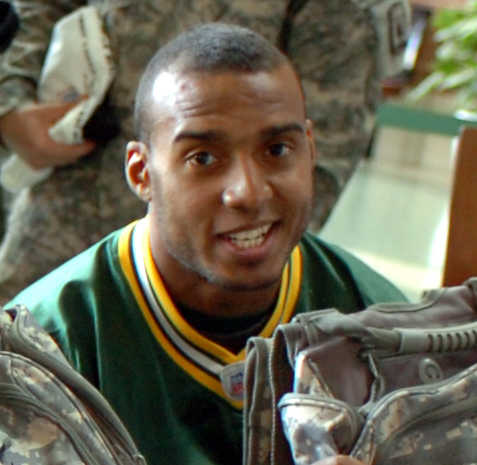
Ryan Grant, 2004 captain. He won Super Bowl XLV with the Green Bay Packers

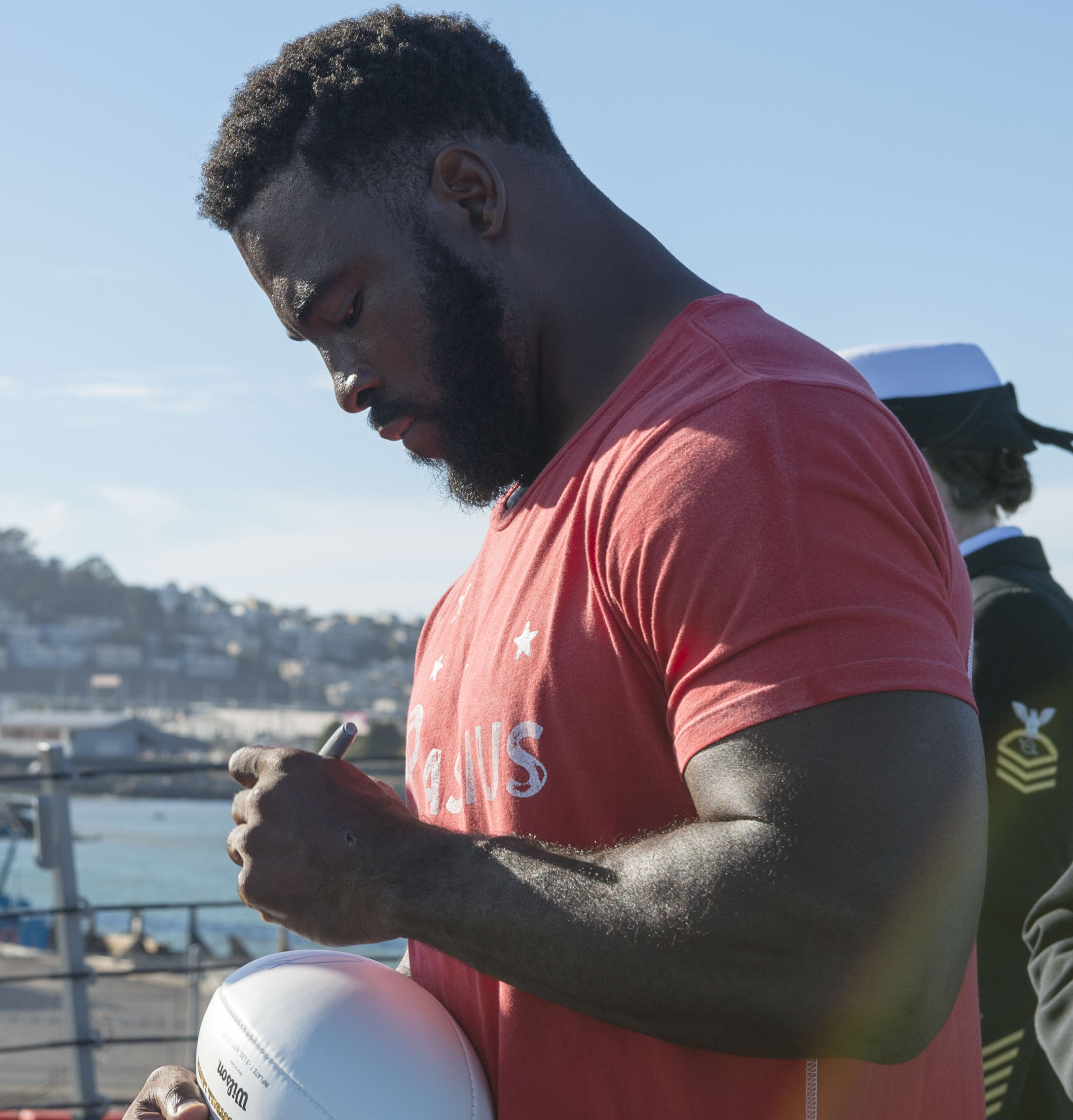
Justin Tuck, 2005 captain. He won Super Bowls XLII and XLVI with the New York Giants

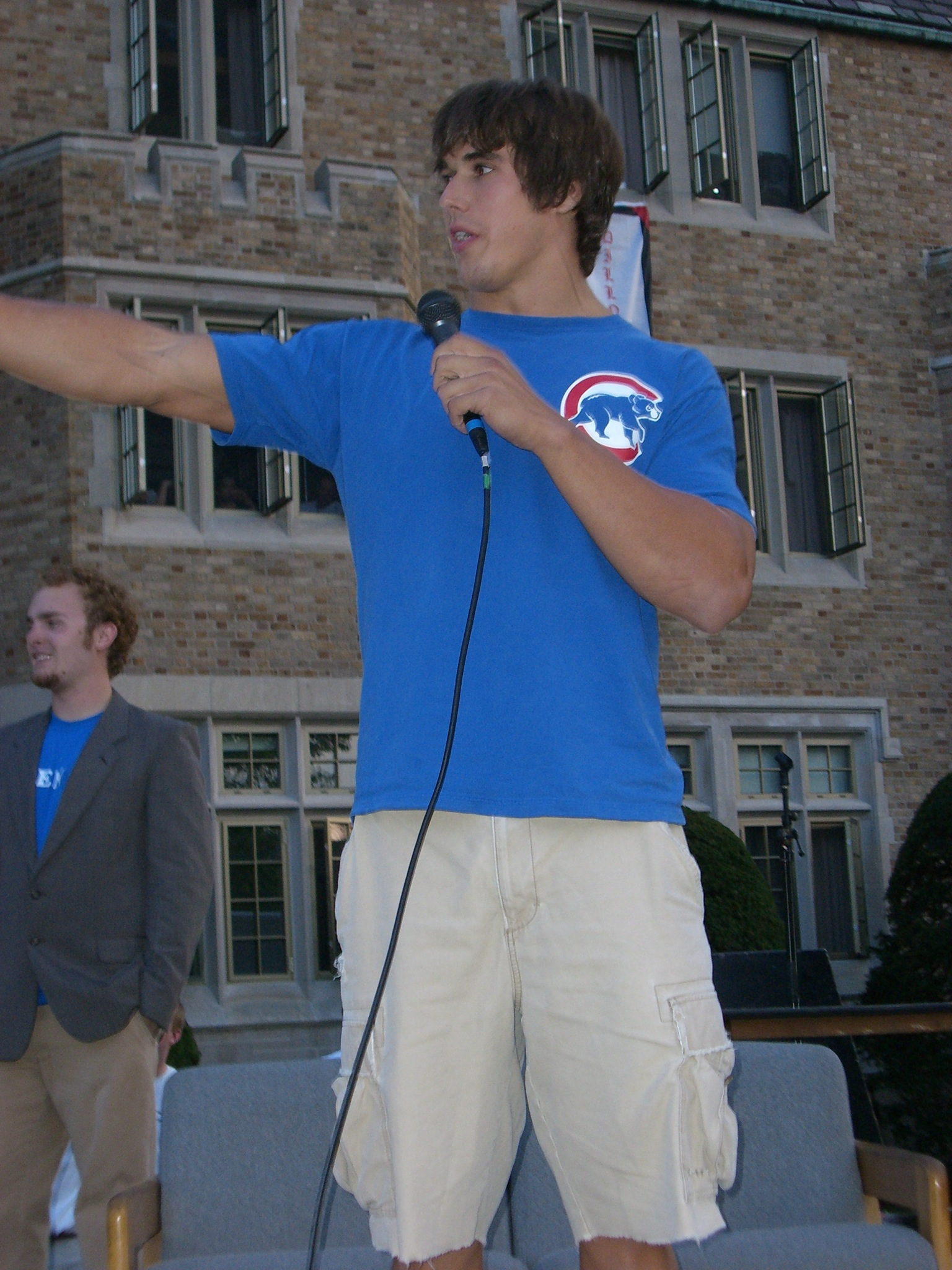
Brady Quinn, 2005 captain. He was one of the greatest quarterbacks to ever play for Notre Dame, and set 36 school records.

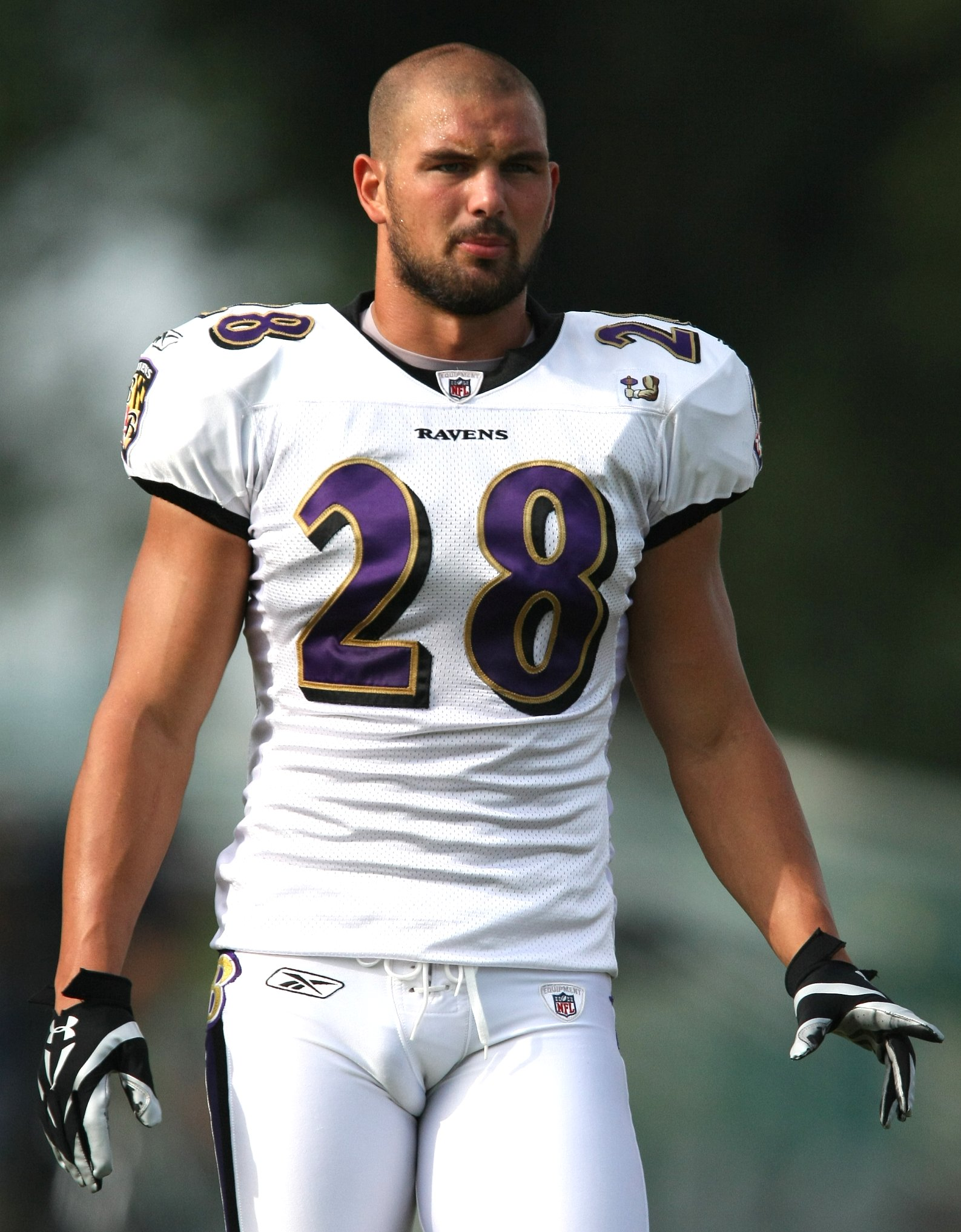
Tom Zbikowski, 2006 captain. He was also a professional boxer and firefighter.

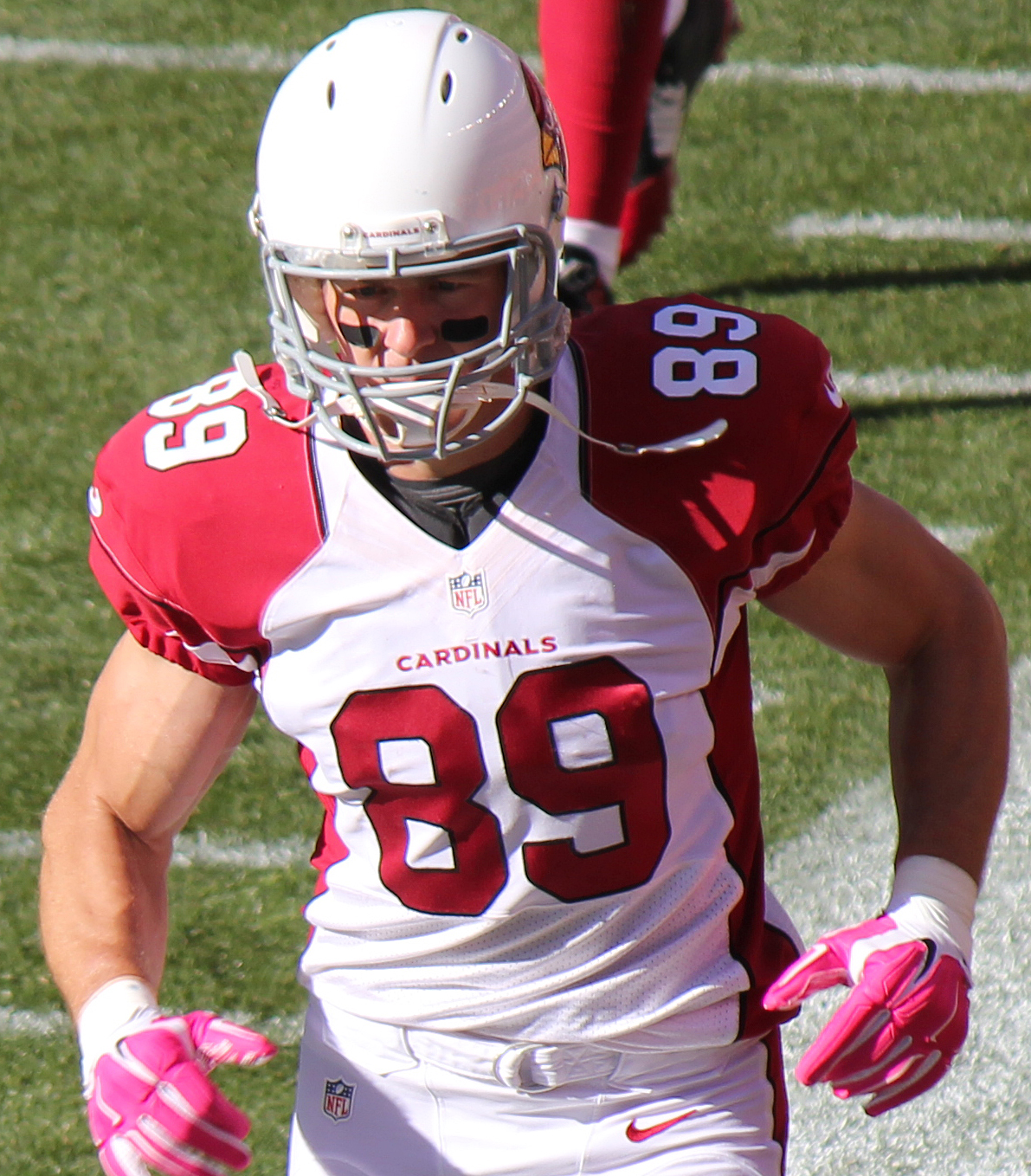
John Carlson, 2007 captain.

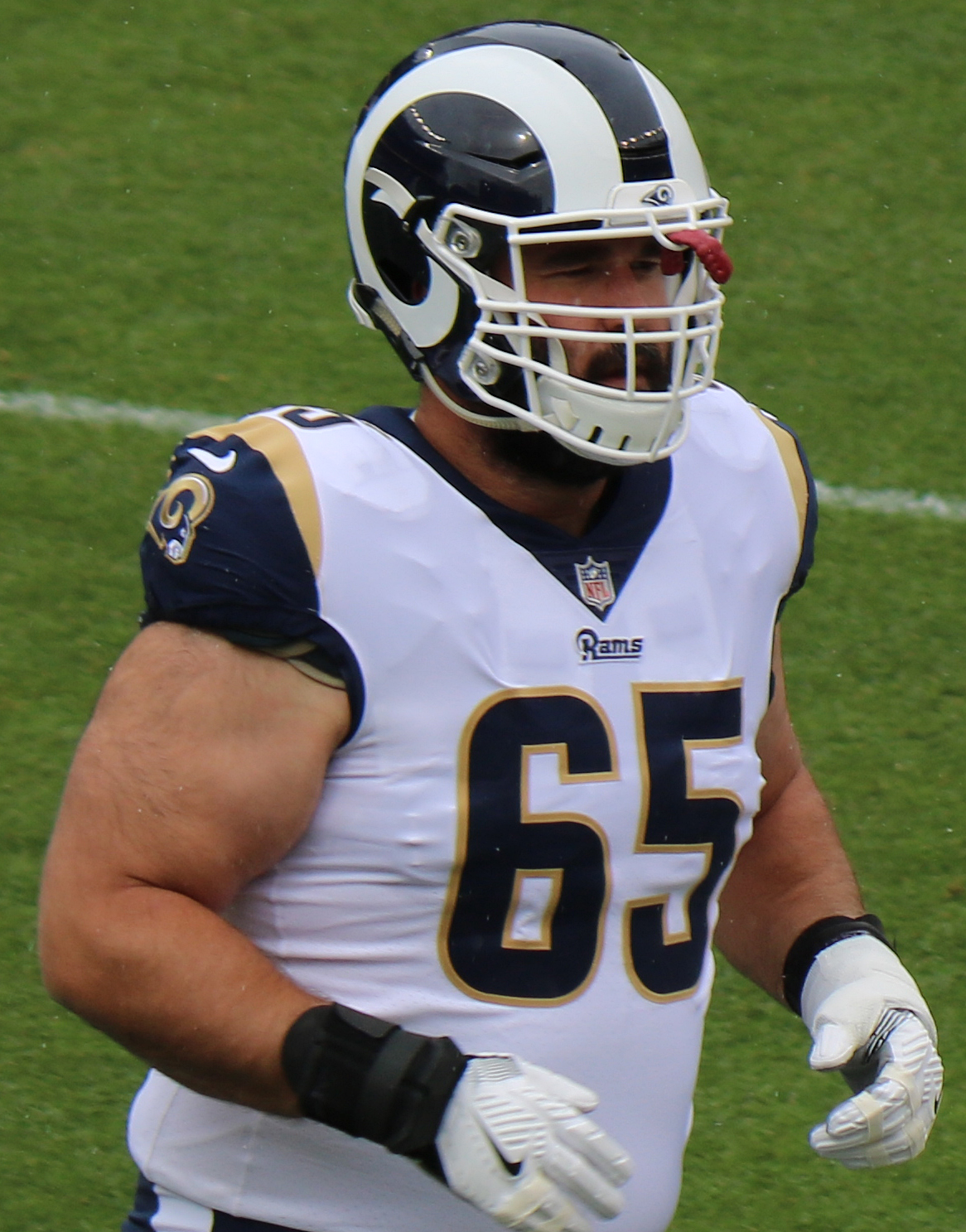
John Sullivan, 2007 captain.

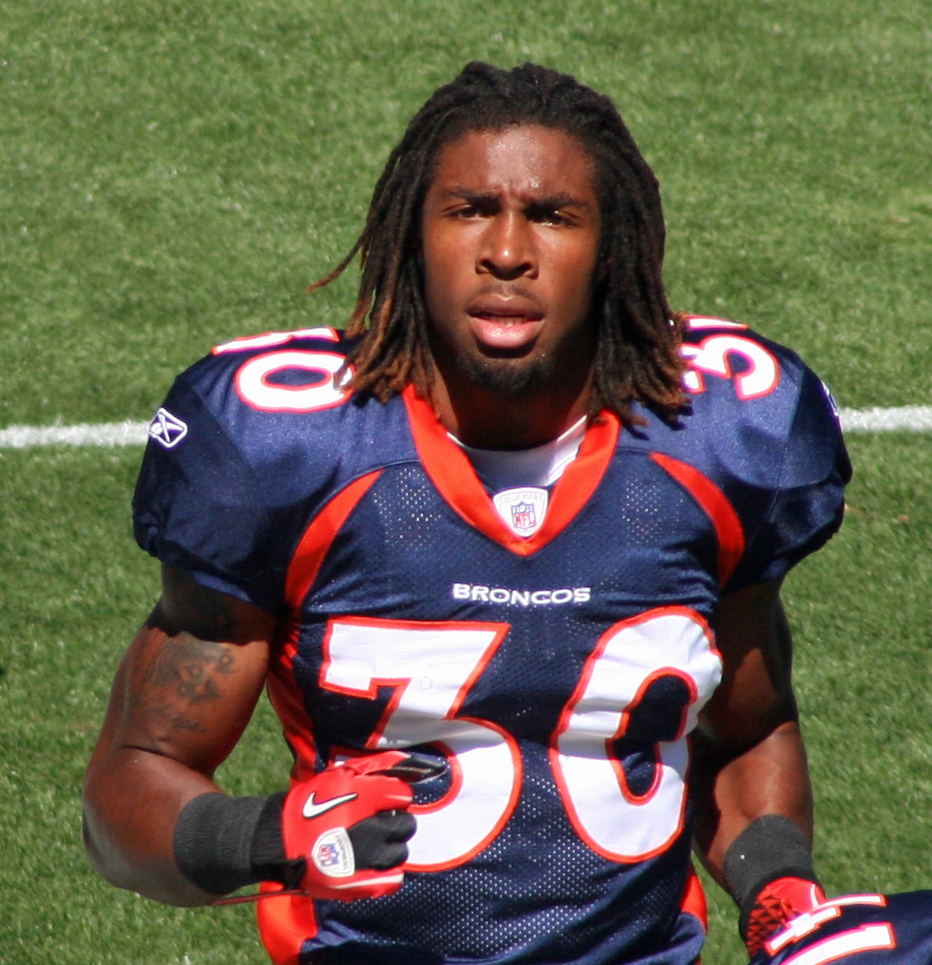
2008 captain. He won Super Bowl 50 with the Denver Broncos.

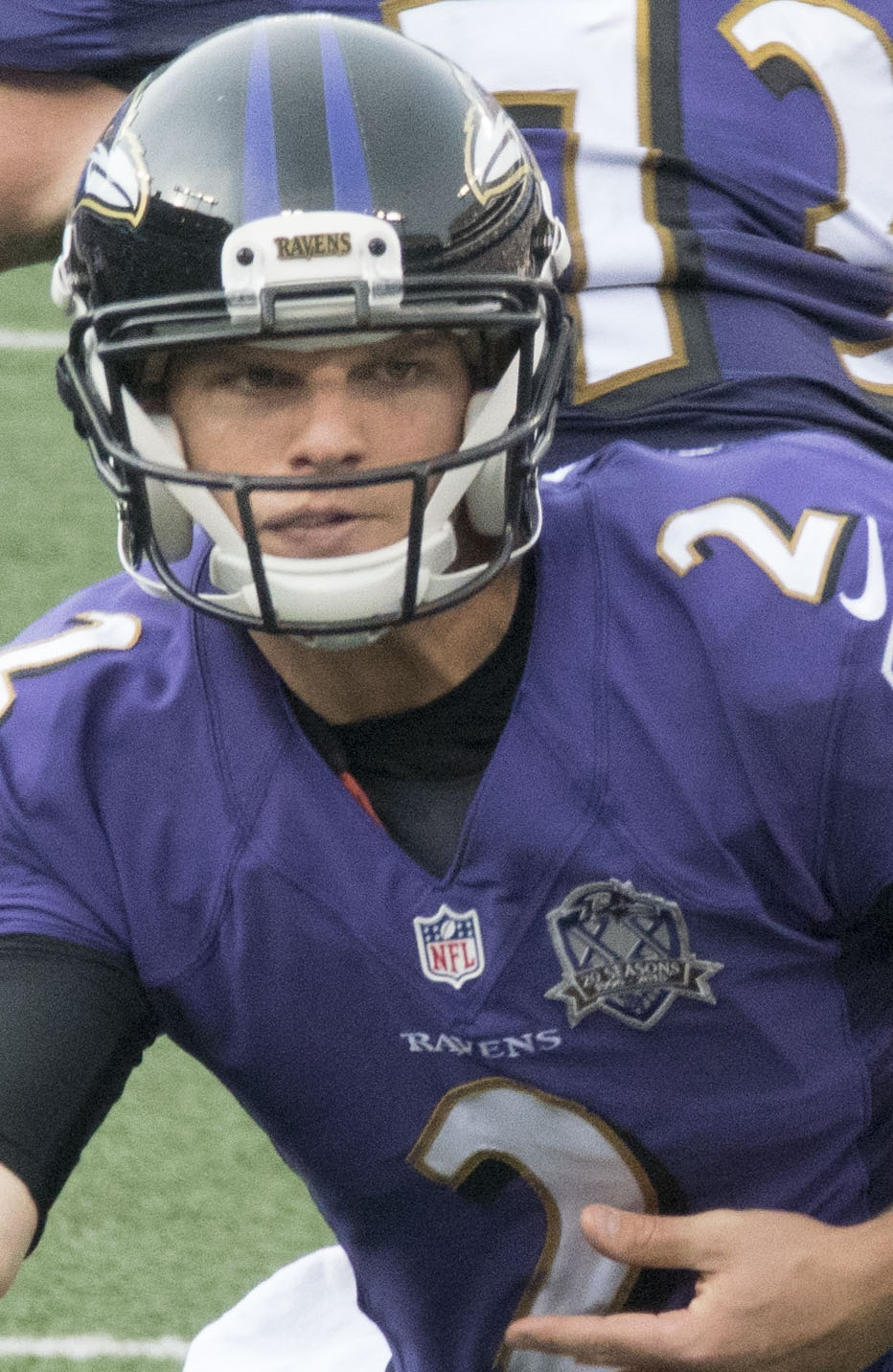
Jimmy Clausen, 2009 captain.

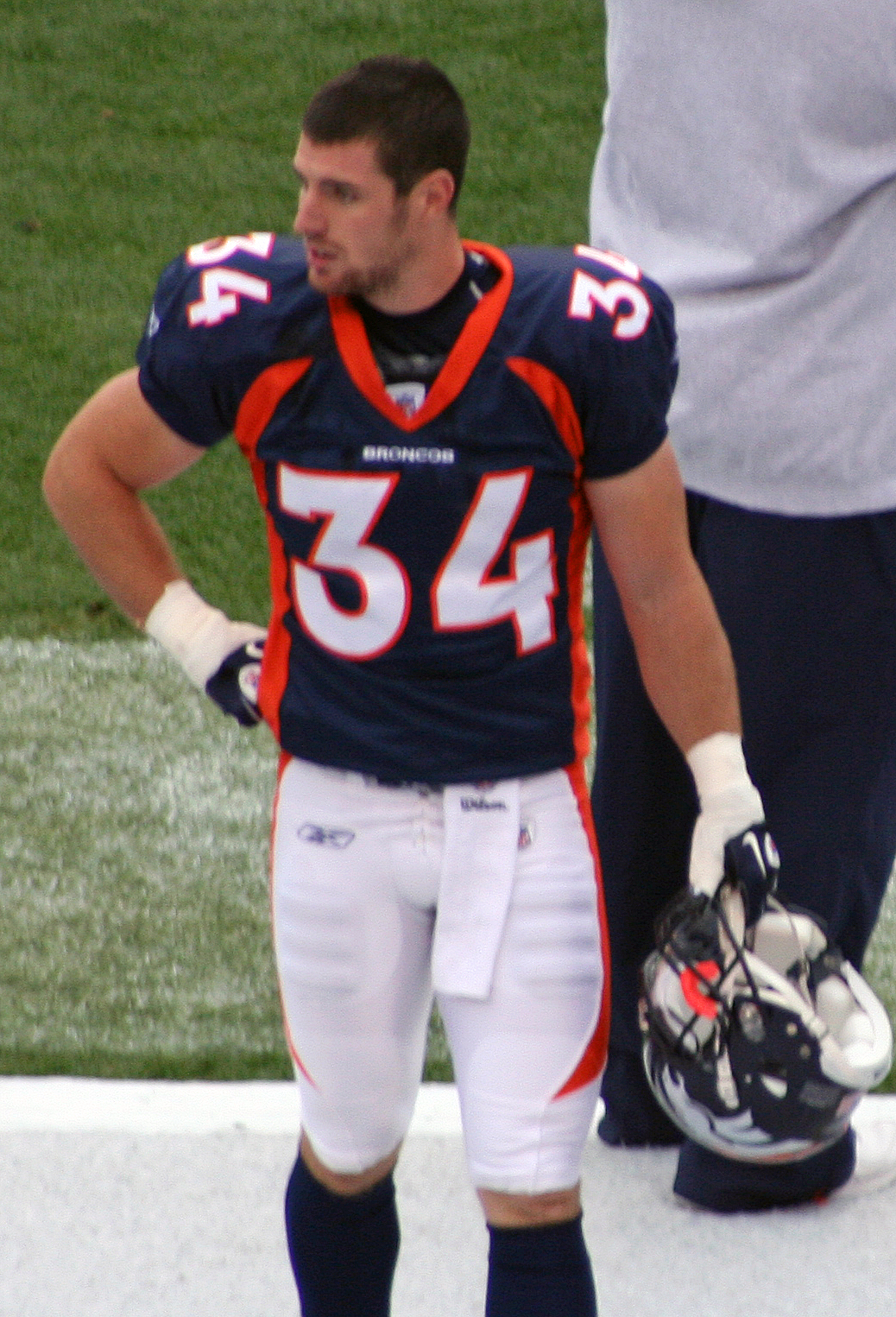
Kyle McCarthy, 2009 captain.

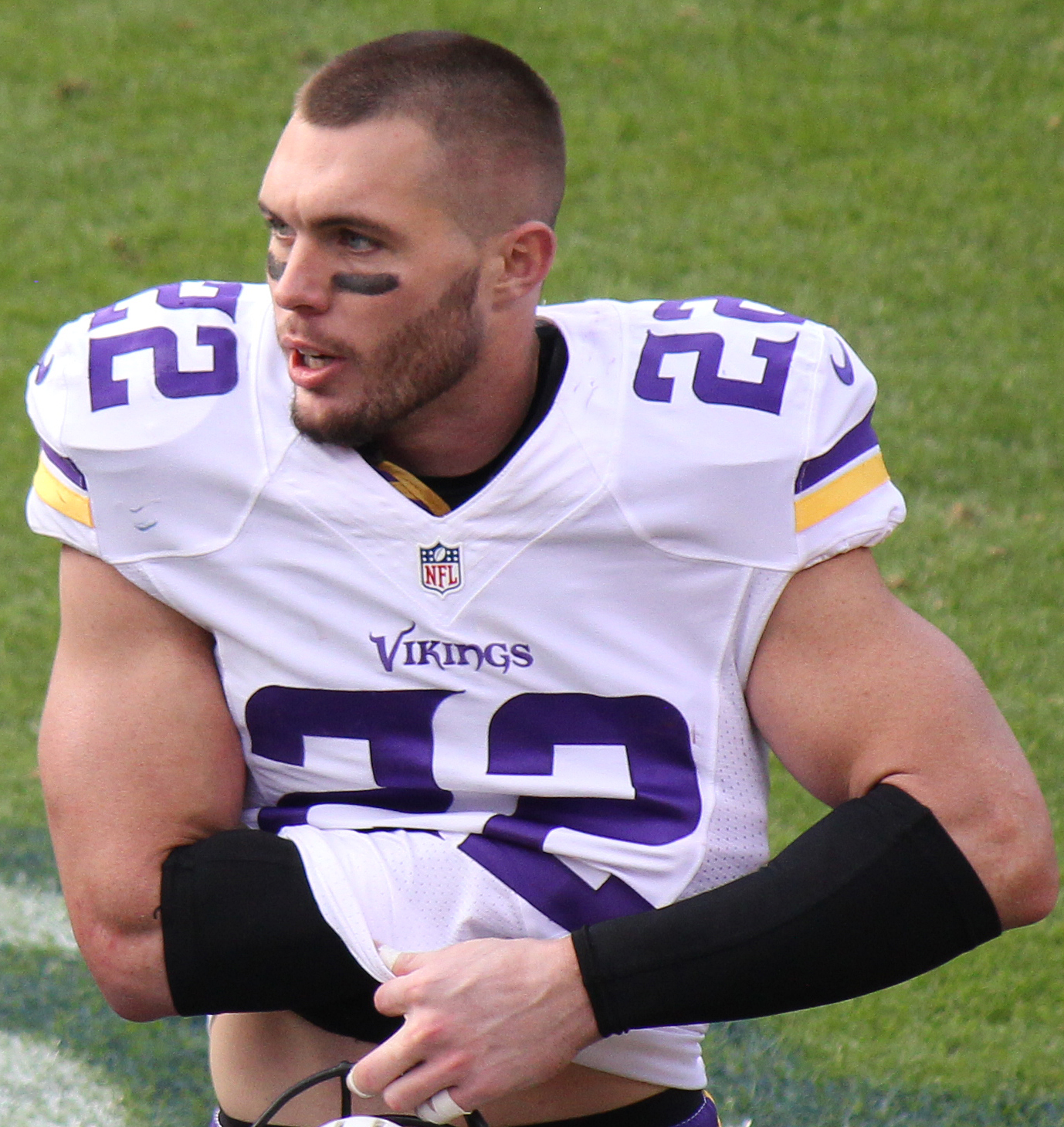
Harrison Smith, 2011 captain. He would play in five consecutive pro bowls from 2015 to 2019.

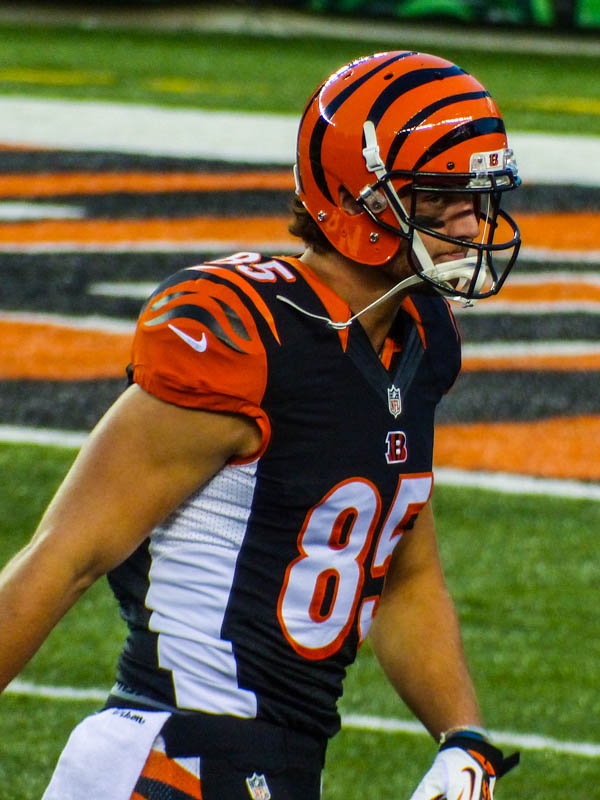
Tyler Eifert, 2012 captain.

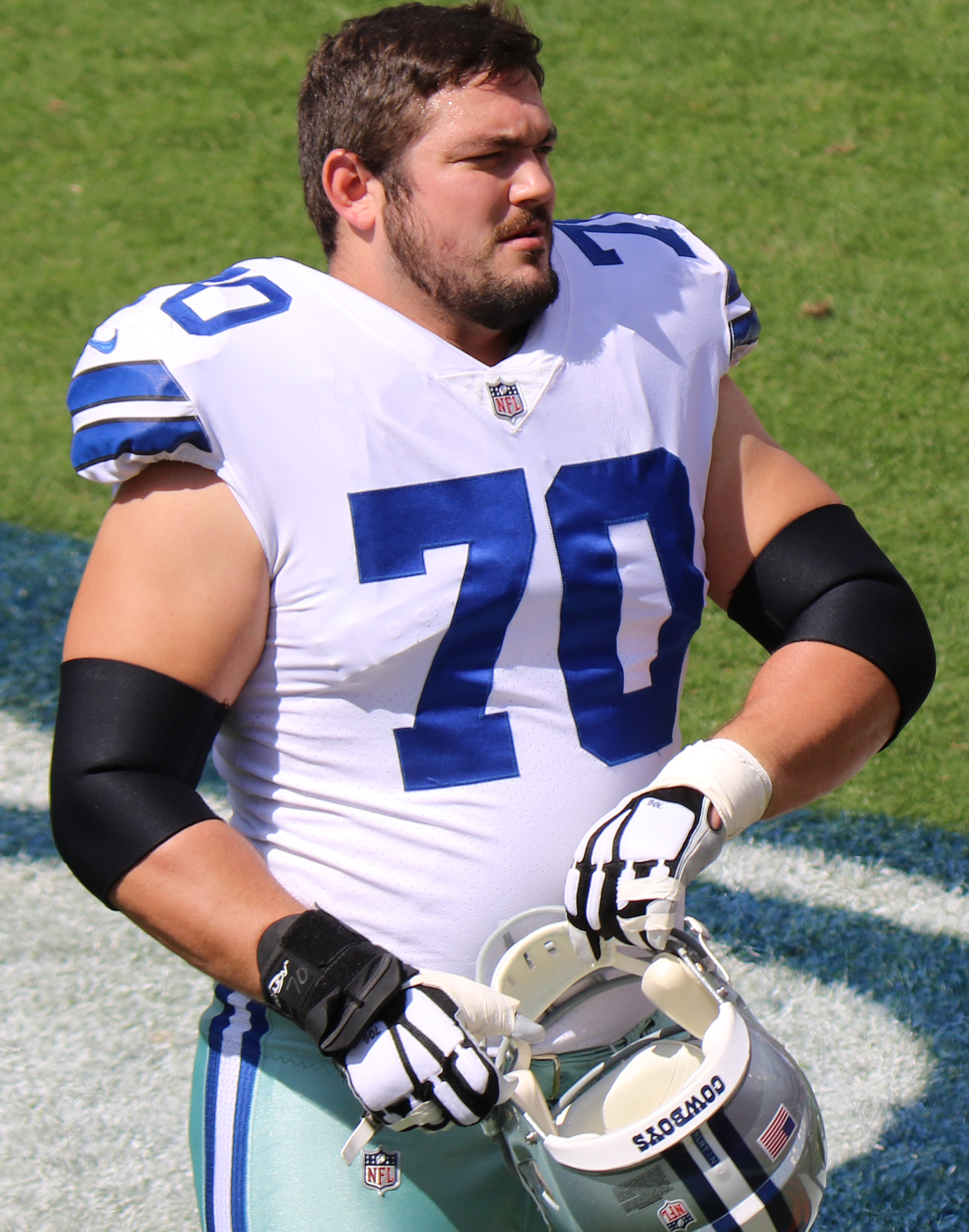
Zack Martin, 2012 captain. He set the record for most starts as an offensive lineman at Notre Dame with 52 during his college career. His MVP honors in the 2013 Pinstripe Bowl were also the first to be received by an offensive lineman in a FBS bowl game at any school since Jay Huffman in 1959.

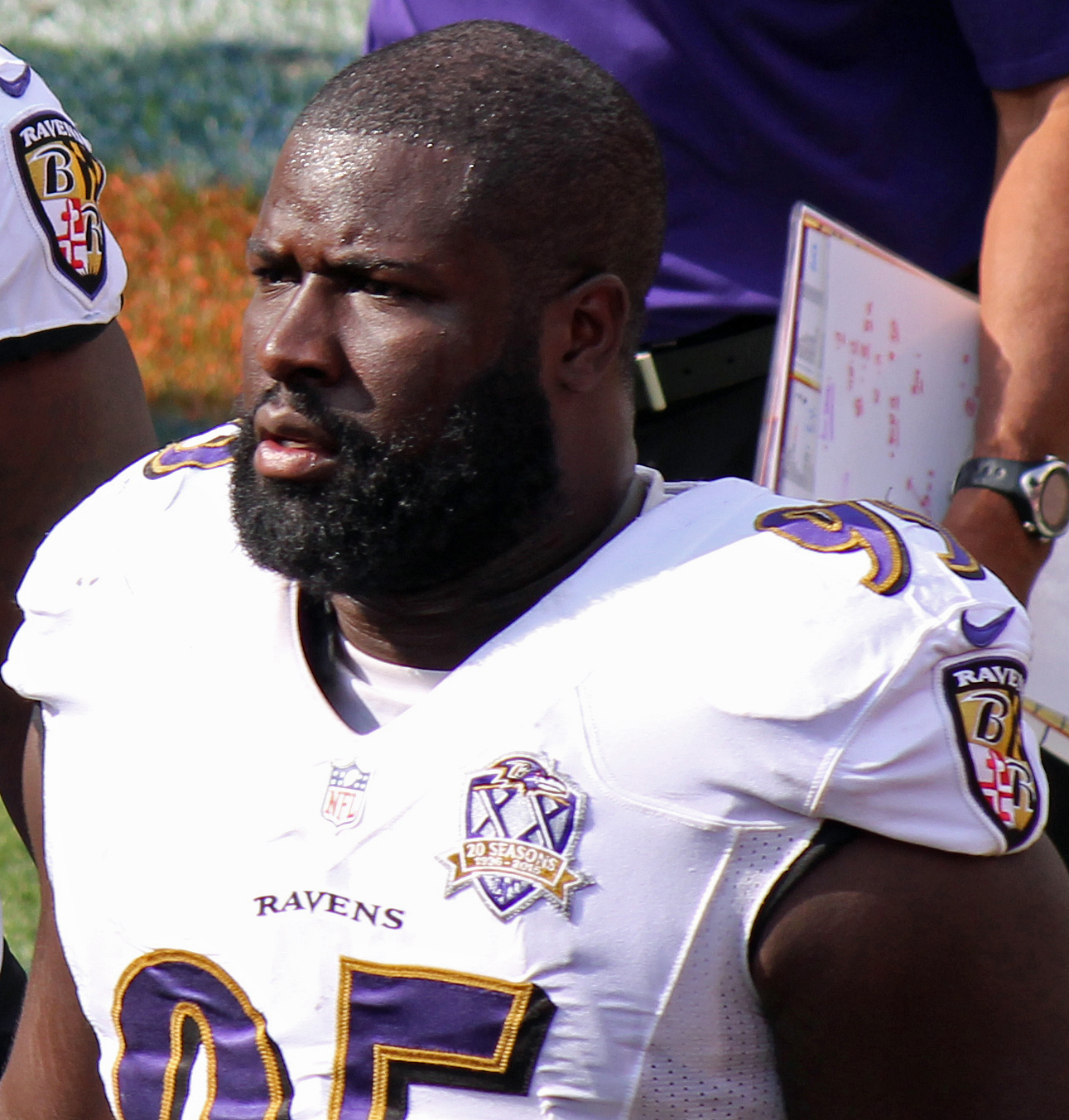
Kapron Lewis-Moore, 2012 captain.

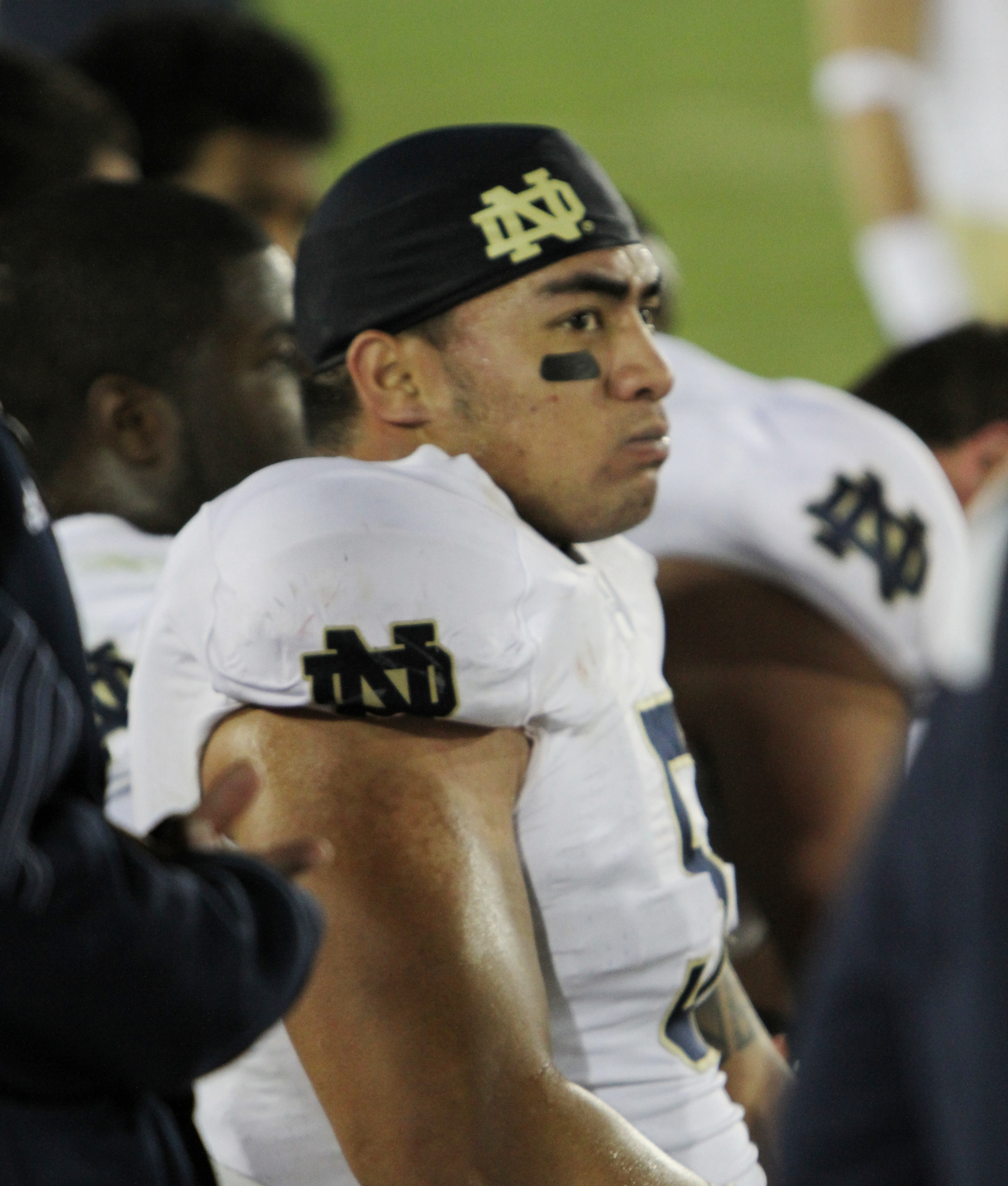
Manti Te'o, 2012 captain. T'eo had an enormously successful season as a Senior, winning the Maxwell, Lott, Chuck Bednarik, Walter Camp, Bronko Nagurski, Butkus, and Lombardi Awards in 2012, along with unanimous All-American recognition.

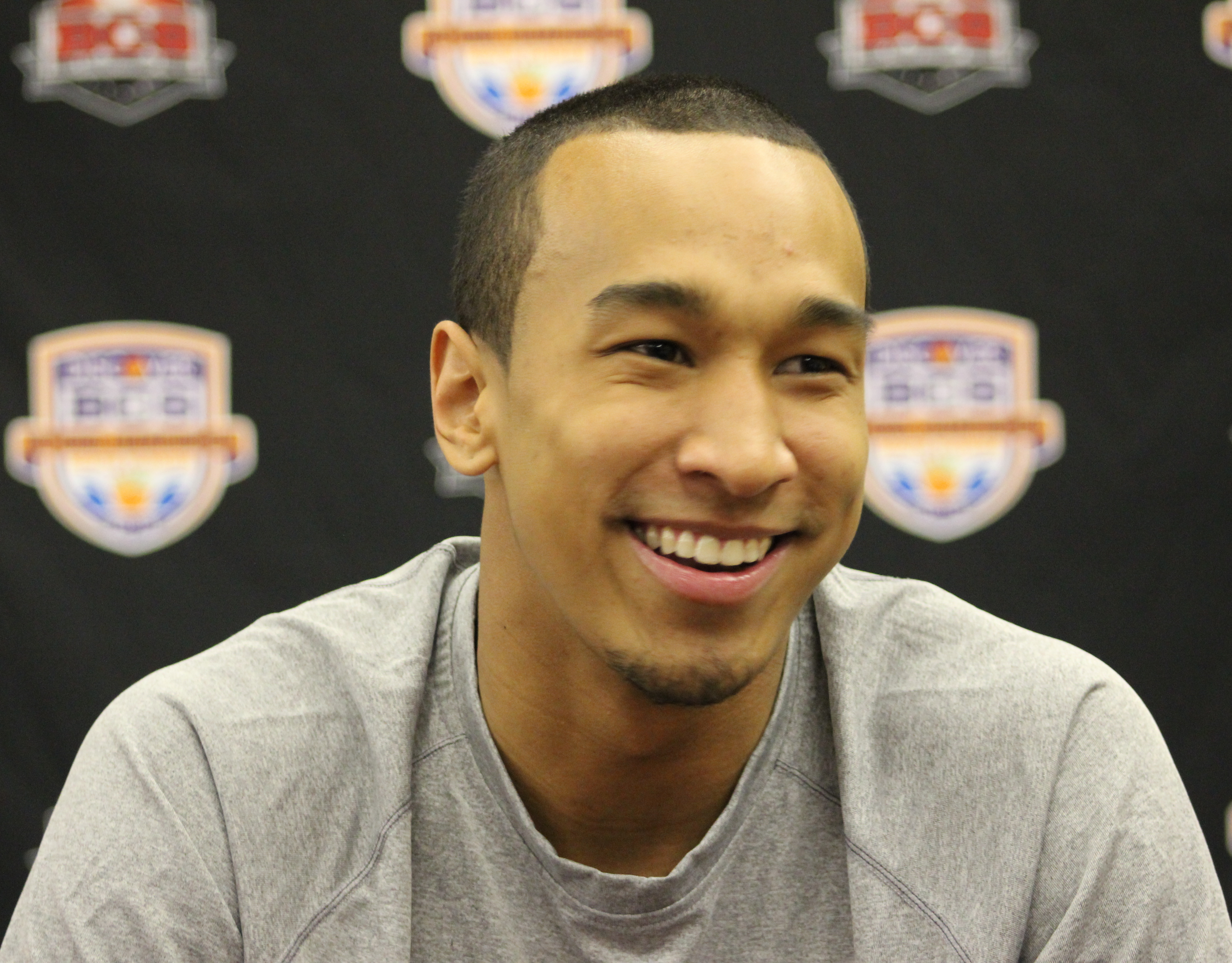
T. J. Jones, 2013 captain.

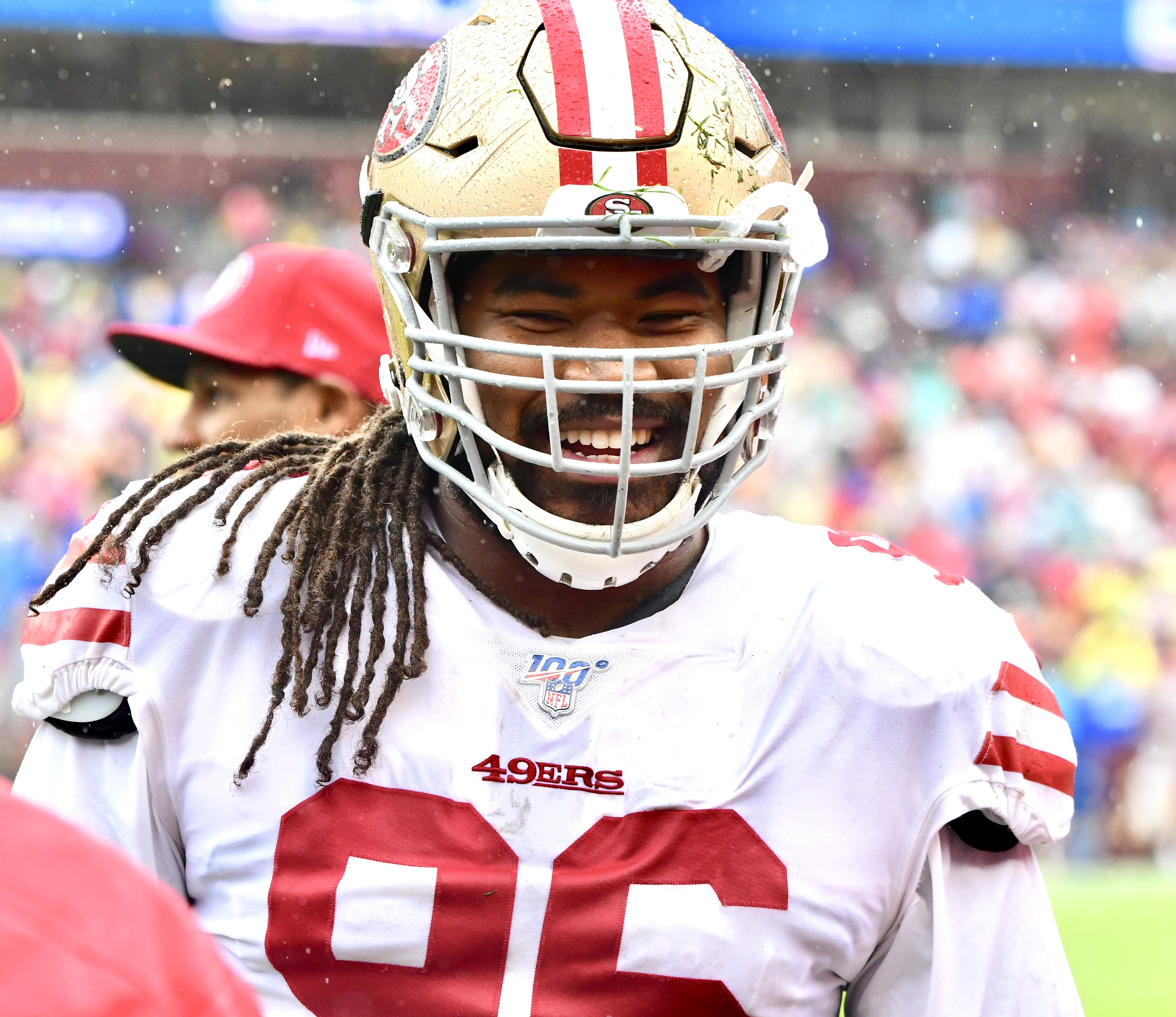
Sheldon Day, 2013 captain.

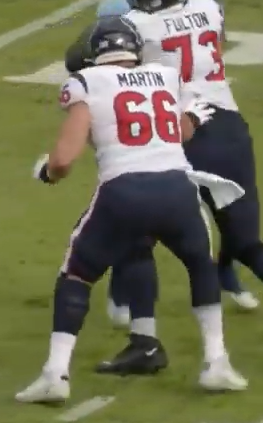
Nick Martin, 2014 captain. He is fellow captain Zack Martin's brother.

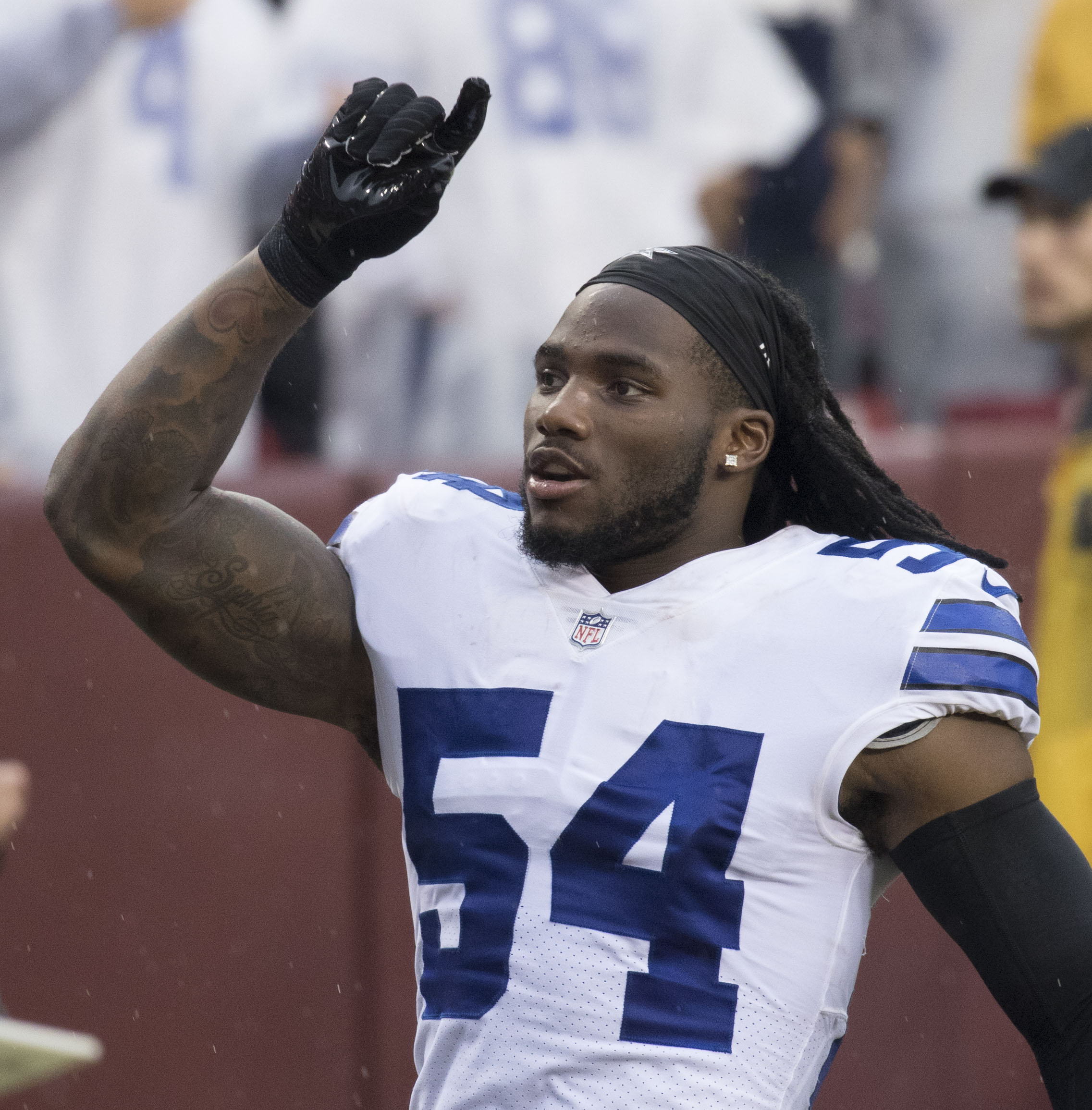
Jaylon Smith, 2015 captain

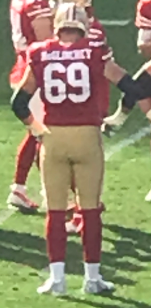
Mike McGlinchey, 2016 captain.

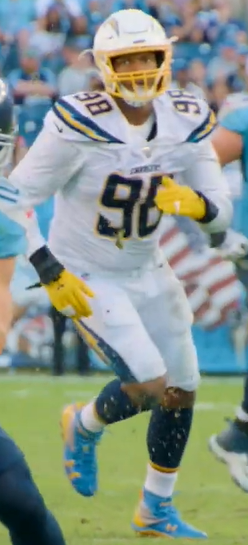
Isaac Rochell, 2016 captain.

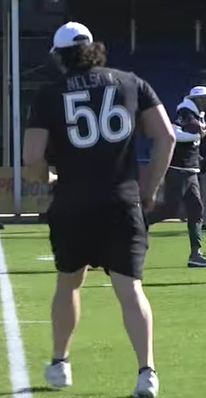
Quenton Nelson, 2017 captain.

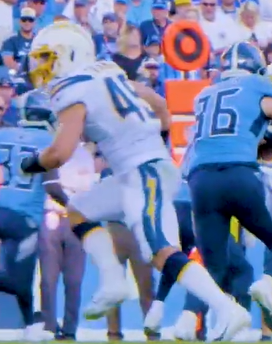
Drue Tranquill, 2017 captain.

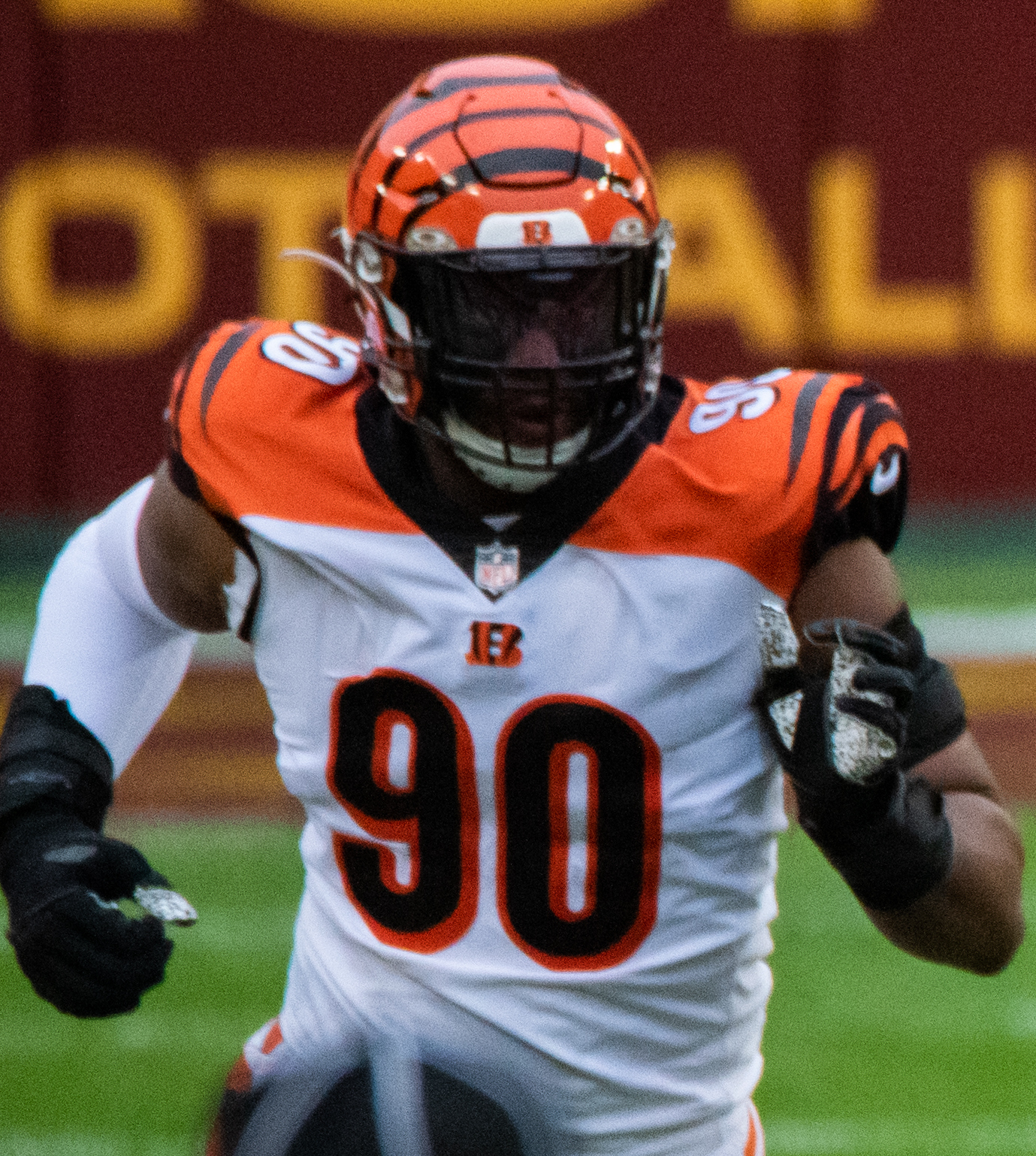
Khalid Kareem, 2019 captain.

List of Captains of the Notre Dame Fighting Irish football team
Year	Name	Position	College Awards
1887	Henry Luhn	HB	
1888	Edward Prudhomme	FB	
1889	Edward Prudhomme (2)	FB	
1892	Pat Coady	QB	
1893	Frank Keough	HB	
1894	Frank Keough (2)	HB	
1895	Dan Casey	G	
1896	Frank Hering	QB	
1897	Jack Mullen	E	
1898	Jack Mullen (2)	E	
1899	Jack Mullen (3)	E	
1900	John Farley	FB	
1901	Al Fortin	E/T	
1902	Louis "Red" Salmon	FB	AA (1903), CFHOF (1971)
1903	Louis "Red" Salmon (2)	FB	AA (1903), CFHOF (1971)
1904	Frank Shaughnessy	E	
1905	Pat Beacom	G	
1906	Bob Bracken	QB	
1907	Dom Callicrate	HB	
1908	Harry Miller	HB/C	
1909	Cap Edwards	G/T	
1910	Ralph Dimmick	T	
1911	Luke Kelly	T	
1912	Gus Dorais	QB	Consensus AA (1913), CFHOF (1954)
1913	Knute Rockne	E	AA (1913), National Champions (1924, 1929, 1930 as coach), CFHOF (1951),
1914	Keith Jones	G/T	
1915	Freeman Fitzgerald	G	AA (1915)
1916	Stan Cofall	HB	AA (1916)
1917	Jim Phelan	QB	CFHOF (1973)
1918	Leonard Bahan	HB	
1919	Leonard Bahan (2)	QB	
1920	Frank Coughlin	T	
1921	Eddie Anderson	E	Consensus AA (1921), CFHOF (1971)
1922	Glen Carberry	E	
1923	Harvey Brown	G	
1924	Adam Walsh	C	AA (1924), national champion (1924)
1925	Clem Crowe	E	National champion (1924)
1926	Gene "Red" Edwards	QB	National champion (1924)
1926	Tom Hearden	HB	
1927	John "Clipper" Smith	G	Consensus AA (1927), CFHOF (1975)
1928	Fred Miller	T	AA (1928), CFHOF (1985)
1929	John Law	G	National champion (1929)
1930	Tom Conley	E	National champions (1929, 1930)
1931	Tommy Yarr	C	National champions (1929, 1930), Consensus AA (1931), CFHOF (1987)
1932	Paul Host	E	
1933	Hugh Devore	E	AA (1933)
1933	Tom Gorman	C	National champion (1930)
1934	Dom Vairo	DE	
1935	Joe Sullivan	E/T	
1936	Bill Smith	G	
1936	John Lautar	G	
1937	Joe Zwers	E	
1938	Jim McGoldrick	G	
1939	Johnny Kelly	E	
1940	Milt Piepul	FB	AA (1939–1940),
1941	Paul Lillis	T	
1942	George Murphy	E	
1943	Pat Filley	G/T	Consensus AA (1943), national champion (1943)
1944	Pat Filley (2)	G/T	Consensus AA (1943), national champion (1943)
1945	Frank Dancewicz	QB	National champion (1943), AA (1945), Heisman finalist (1945, 6th)
1946	Game-by-Game		
1947	George Connor	LB/T	AA (1943), Outland Trophy (1946), consensus AA (1946–1947), national champion (1946–1947), CFHOF (1963)
1948	Bill Fischer	T/G/DT	national champions (1946–1947), Consensus AA (1947–1948), Outland Trophy (1948), CFHOF (1983)
1949	Leon Hart	E	National champions (1946, 1947, 1949), AA (1947), Consensus AA (1948–1949), Heisman Trophy (1949), Maxwell Award (1949), Sporting News Player of the Year (1949), CFHOF (1973)
1949	Jim Martin	T	National champions (1946, 1947, 1949), AA (1949), CFHOF (1995)
1950	Jerry Groom	C/LB	National champion (1949), Consensus AA (1950), CFHOF (1994)
1951	Jim Mutscheller	DE/TE	National champion (1949), AA (1951)
1952	Jack Alessandrini	G/LB	
1953	Don Penza	E	
1954	Paul Matz	E	
1954	Dan Shannon	E	
1955	Ray Lemek	G/T	
1956	Jim Morse	HB	
1957	Dick Prendergast	E	
1957	Ed Sullivan	C	
1958	Al Ecuyer	G	Consensus AA (1957)
1958	Chuck Puntillo	T	
1959	Ken Adamson	G	
1960	Myron Pottios	G	AA (1960)
1961	Nick Buoniconti	G/T	AA (1961)
1961	Norb Roy	G	
1962	Mike Lind	FB	
1963	Bob Lehmann	G	
1964	Jim Carroll	LB	AA (1964)
1965	Phil Sheridan	E	
1966	Jim Lynch	LB	National champion (1966), Maxwell Award (1966), unanimous AA (1966), CFHOF (1992)
1967	Rocky Bleier	HB	National champion (1966)
1968	George Kunz	T	National champion (1966), Consensus AA (1968)
1968	Bob Olson	LB	Cotton Bowl Defensive MVP (1970)
1969	Bob Olson (2)	LB	Cotton Bowl Defensive MVP (1970)
1969	Mike Oriard	C/G	
1970	Larry DiNardo	G	Consensus AA (1970)
1970	Tim Kelly	LB	
1971	Thom Gatewood	SE	Consensus AA (1970), CFHOF (2015)
1971	Walt Patulski	DE	Consensus AA (1971), Lombardi Award (1971), UPI Lineman of the Year (1971), Heisman finalist (1971, 6th)
1972	John Dampeer	T	
1972	Greg Marx	DE/T	Consensus AA (1972)
1973	Dave Casper	TE	Consensus AA (1973), national champion (1973), CFHOF (2012)
1973	Frank Pomarico	G	
1973	Mike Townsend	DB/FS	Consensus AA (1973), national champion (1973)
1974	Tom Clements	QB	National champion (1973), AA (1974), Heisman finalist (1974, 4th)
1974	Greg Collins	LB	National champion (1973), AA (1974)
1975	Ed Bauer	T	
1975	Jim Stock	LB	
1976	Mark McLane	HB	
1976	Willie Fry	DE	AA (1977), National champion (1977)
1977	Ross Browner	DE	National champions (1973, 1977), Outland Trophy (1976), Unanimous AA (1976–1977), UPI Lineman of the Year (1976–1977), Heisman finalist (1977, 5th), Lombardi Award (1977), CFHOF (1999)
1977	Terry Eurick	HB	
1977	Willie Fry (2)	DE	AA (1977), National champion (1977)
1977	Steve Orsini	RB	
1978	Bob Golic	DT/LB	AA (1927), National champion (1977), Unanimous AA (1978)
1978	Jerome Heavens	FB	National champion (1977)
1978	Joe Montana	QB	National champion (1977), Cotton Bowl MVP (1979)
1979	Vagas Ferguson	HB	National champion (1977), Cotton Bowl Offensive MVP (1978), Consensus AA (1979), Heisman finalist (1979, 5th)
1979	Tim Foley	T	National champion (1977), AA (1979)
1979	Dave Waymer	FS/CB	National champion (1977)
1980	Bob Crable	LB	Consensus AA (1980–1981), CFHOF (2017)
1980	Tom Gibbons	FS	
1980	John Scully	C	
1981	Phil Carter	TB	
1981	Bob Crable (2)	LB	Consensus AA (1980–1981), CFHOF (2017)
1982	Phil Carter (2)	TB	
1982	Dave Duerson	FS	AA (1981–1982), Team MVP (1982), Edward "Moose" Krause Distinguished Service Award (1990)
1982	Mark Zavagnin	LB	
1983	Blair Kiel	QB	
1983	Stacey Toran	CB/S	
1984	Mike Golic	LB/DT	
1984	Joe Johnson	WR/SS	
1984	Larry Williams	G	AA (1984)
1985	Tony Furjanic	LB	
1985	Mike Larkin	LB	
1985	Allen Pinkett	TB	AA (1983), Heisman finalist (1983, 16th), Heisman finalist (1985, 8th)
1985	Tim Scannell	G	
1986	Mike Kovaleski	LB	
1987	Chuck Lanza	C	AA (1987)
1987	Byron Spruell	T	
1988	Ned Bolcar	LB	AA (1987, 1989), National champion (1988)
1988	Mark Green	TB	National champion (1988)
1988	Andy Heck	T	AA (1988), National champion (1988)
1989	Ned Bolcar (2)	LB	AA (1987, 1989), National champion (1988)
1989	Anthony Johnson	FB	National champion (1988)
1989	Tony Rice	QB	National champion (1988), AA (1989), Heisman finalist (1989, 4th), Johnny Unitas Golden Arm Award (1989)
1990	Mike Heldt	C	
1990	Todd Lyght	CB	National champion (1988), Consensus AA (1989–1990)
1990	Ricky Watters	RB	National champion (1988)
1990	Chris Zorich	DT	AA (1988), National champion (1988), Consensus AA (1989), UPI Lineman of the Year (1989), Lombardi Award (1990), Unanimous AA (1990), Orange Bowl Defensive MVP (1991), CFHOF (2007)
1991	Rodney Culver	TB	National champion (1988)
1992	Demetrius Debose	LB	
1992	Rick Mirer	QB	Team MVP (1992)
1993	Jeff Buris	DB	Consensus AA (1993)
1993	Tim Ruddy	C	AA (1993)
1993	Aaron Taylor	G/T	Consensus AA (1992–1993), Jim Parker Award (1993), Lombardi Award (1993)
1993	Bryant Young	DT	AA (1993)
1994	Lee Becton	TB	
1994	Justin Goheen	LB	
1994	Brian Hamilton	DE	
1994	Ryan Leahy	OG	
1995	Paul Grasmanis	DL	
1995	Ryan Leahy (2)	OG	
1995	Derrick Mayes	WR/SE	
1995	Shawn Wooden	S/CB	
1995	Dusty Zeigler	C/OG	
1996	Lyron Cobbins	LB	AA (1996)
1996	Marc Edwards	FB	
1996	Ron Powlus	QB	
1997	Melvin Dansby	DE	
1997	Ron Powlus (2)	QB	
1997	Allen Rossum	CB	
1998	Bobbie Howard	LB	
1998	Kory Minor	LB	
1998	Mike Rosenthal	OT	AA (1998)
1999	Jarious Jackson	QB	
2000	Anthony Denman	LB	AA (2000), Team MVP (2000)
2000	Jabari Holloway	TE	
2000	Grant Irons	DE	
2000	Dan O'Leary	TE	
2001	Rocky Boiman	LB	
2001	David Givens	FL	
2001	Grant Irons (2)	DE	
2001	Anthony Weaver	DE	Team MVP (2001)
2002	Arnaz Battle	WR	
2002	Sean Mahan	OG	Team MVP (2002)
2002	Gerome Sapp	S	
2002	Shane Walton	S/CB	Unanimous AA (2002)
2003	Darrell Campbell	DT	
2003	Vontez Duff	CB	
2003	Omar Jenkins	WR	
2003	Jim Molinaro	OT	
2004	Mike Goolsby	OL	
2004	Ryan Grant	RB	
2004	Carlyle Holiday	WR	
2004	Justin Tuck	DE	
2005	Brandon Hoyte	LB	
2005	Brady Quinn	QB	Heisman finalist (2005, 4th), Sammy Baugh Trophy (2005), AA (2006), Heisman finalist (2006, 3rd), Johnny Unitas Golden Arm Award (2006), Maxwell Award (2006)
2006	Brady Quinn (2)	QB	Heisman finalist (2005, 4th), Sammy Baugh Trophy (2005), AA (2006), Heisman finalist (2006, 3rd), Johnny Unitas Golden Arm Award (2006), Maxwell Award (2006)
2006	Travis Thomas	HB	
2006	Tom Zbikowski	S	AA (2005–2006)
2007	John Carlson	TE	AA (2006)
2007	Maurice Crum Jr.	DL	Team Defensive MVP (2008)
2007	John Sullivan	C	
2007	Travis Thomas (2)	HB	
2007	Tom Zbikowski (2)	S	AA (2005–2006)
2008	David Bruton	S	
2008	Maurice Crum Jr. (2)	DL	Team Defensive MVP (2008)
2008	David Grimes	WR	
2009	Jimmy Clausen	QB	AA (2009)
2009	Kyle McCarthy	S	
2009	Eris Olsen	G	
2009	Scott Smith	LB	
2010	Game-by-Game		
2011	Harrison Smith	S	
2012	Tyler Eifert	TE	AA (2012), John Mackey Award (2012)
2012	Kapron Lewis-Moore	DE	
2012	Zack Martin	G	AA (2012), Pinstripe Bowl MVP (2013)
2012	Manti Te'o	LB	AA (2010–2011), Bronko Nagurski Trophy (2012), Butkus Award (2012), Chuck Bednarik Award (2012), Heisman finalist (2012, 2nd), Lombardi Award (2012), Lott Trophy (2012), Maxwell Award (2012), Walter Camp Award (2012), Unanimous AA (2012)
2013	Bennett Jackson	S	
2013	T. J. Jones	WR	
2013	Zack Martin (2)	G	AA (2012), Pinstripe Bowl MVP (2013)
2014	Austin Collinsworth	S	
2014	Sheldon Day	DT	AA (2015)
2014	Nick Martin	OG	
2014	Cam McDaniel	RB	
2015	Sheldon Day (2)	DT	AA (2015)
2015	Matthias Farley	S	
2015	Nick Martin (2)	OG	
2015	Joe Schmidt	LB	
2015	Jaylon Smith	LB	AA (2014), Consensus AA (2015), Dick Butkus Award (2015)
2016	Torii Hunter Jr.	WR	
2016	Mike McGlinchey	OT	Consensus AA (2017)
2016	James Onwualu	LB	
2016	Isaac Rochell	DE	
2017	Josh Adams	RB	
2017	DeShone Kizer	QB	
2017	Greer Martini	LB	
2017	Mike McGlinchey (2)	OT	Consensus AA (2017)
2017	Nyles Morgan	LB	
2017	Quenton Nelson	OG	Unanimous AA (2017)
2017	Drue Tranquill	LB	Wuerffel Trophy (2018)
2017	Austin Webster	WR	
2018	Alex Bars	OL	
2018	Sam Mustipher	C	
2018	Tyler Newsome	P	
2018	Drue Tranquill (2)	LB	Wuerffel Trophy (2018)
2019	Ian Book	QB	All-ACC (2020), Heisman finalist (2020, 9th)
2019	Jalen Elliott	S	
2019	Chris Finke	WR	
2019	Alohi Gilman	S	
2019	Robert Hainsey	OL	
2019	Khalid Kareem	DE	
2019	Julian Okwara	DE	
2020	Ian Book (2)	QB	All-ACC (2020), Heisman finalist (2020, 9th)
2020	Shaun Crawford	S	
2020	Robert Hainsey (2)	OL	
2020	Daelin Hayes	LB	
2020	Adetokunbo Ogundeji	LB	
2021	Avery Davis	WR	
2021	Kyle Hamilton	S	All-ACC (2020), Consensus AA (2021)
2021	Kurt Hinish	NT	
2021	Jarrett Patterson	C	
2021	Myron Tagovailoa-Amosa	DE	All-ACC (2020)
2021	Drew White	LB	
2021	Kyren Williams	RB	ACC Rookie of the year (2020)
2022	Bo Bauer	LB	
2022	JD Bertrand	LB	
2022	Avery Davis (2)	WR	
2022	Isaiah Foskey	DE	Consensus AA (2022)
2022	Michael Mayer	TE	Consensus AA (2022)
2022	Jarrett Patterson (2)	C	
2023	Joe Alt	OL	AA (2022)
2023	JD Bertrand (2)	LB	
2023	Cam Hart	CB	
2023	Sam Hartman	QB	
2024	Jack Kiser	LB	
2024	Riley Leonard	QB	
2024	Rylie Mills	DL	
2024	Benjamin Morrison	CB	
2024	Xavier Watts	S	
2025	Drayk Bowen	LB	
2025	Donovan Hinish	DL	
2025	Will Pauling	WR	
2025	Billy Schrauth	OL	
2025	Adon Shuler	S	
2025	Aamil Wagner	OL	
2026	Drayk Bowen (2)	LB	
2026	CJ Carr	QB	
2026	Jordan Faison	WR	
2026	Adon Shuler (2)	S	

== Game captains ==
No permanent captains were selected during the 1946 and 2010 seasons. Head coaches Frank Leahy (1946) and Brian Kelly (2010) chose a new captain for each game in their respective seasons. Game captains were also selected during the 2002 season under Tyrone Willingham, but four permanent captains were eventually selected at the end of the season.
