= Ritson =

Ritson is an English surname. Notable people with the surname include:

- Adam Ritson (born 1976), Australian rugby league player
- Alex Ritson (1922–2008), Canadian ice hockey player
- Blake Ritson (born 1980), English actor and director
- Bradley Ritson (born 1982), South African footballer
- John Ritson (born 1949), English footballer
- John Anthony Sydney Ritson (1887–1957), English professor of mining and international rugby union player
- Joseph Ritson (1752–1803), English antiquary
- Joshua Ritson (1874–1955), British Labour Party politician
- Ledger Ritson (1921–1977), English footballer
- Ralph Gerald Ritson (1885–1966), English polo player

== See also ==
- Ritson Manuscript, English choirbook
- Ritsons Force, waterfalls in the Lake District, England
