= Hobbins =

Hobbins is a surname. Notable people with the surname include:

- Barry Hobbins (born 1951), American politician
- Daniel Hobbins, American historian
- Graham Hobbins (born 1946), English cricketer
- Imelda Hobbins, Irish camogie player
- Jim Hobbins (born 1964), American football player
- Syd Hobbins (1916–1984), English footballer
- William T. Hobbins (born 1946), United States Air Force general
