= Xavier Watts =

American football player (born 2001)

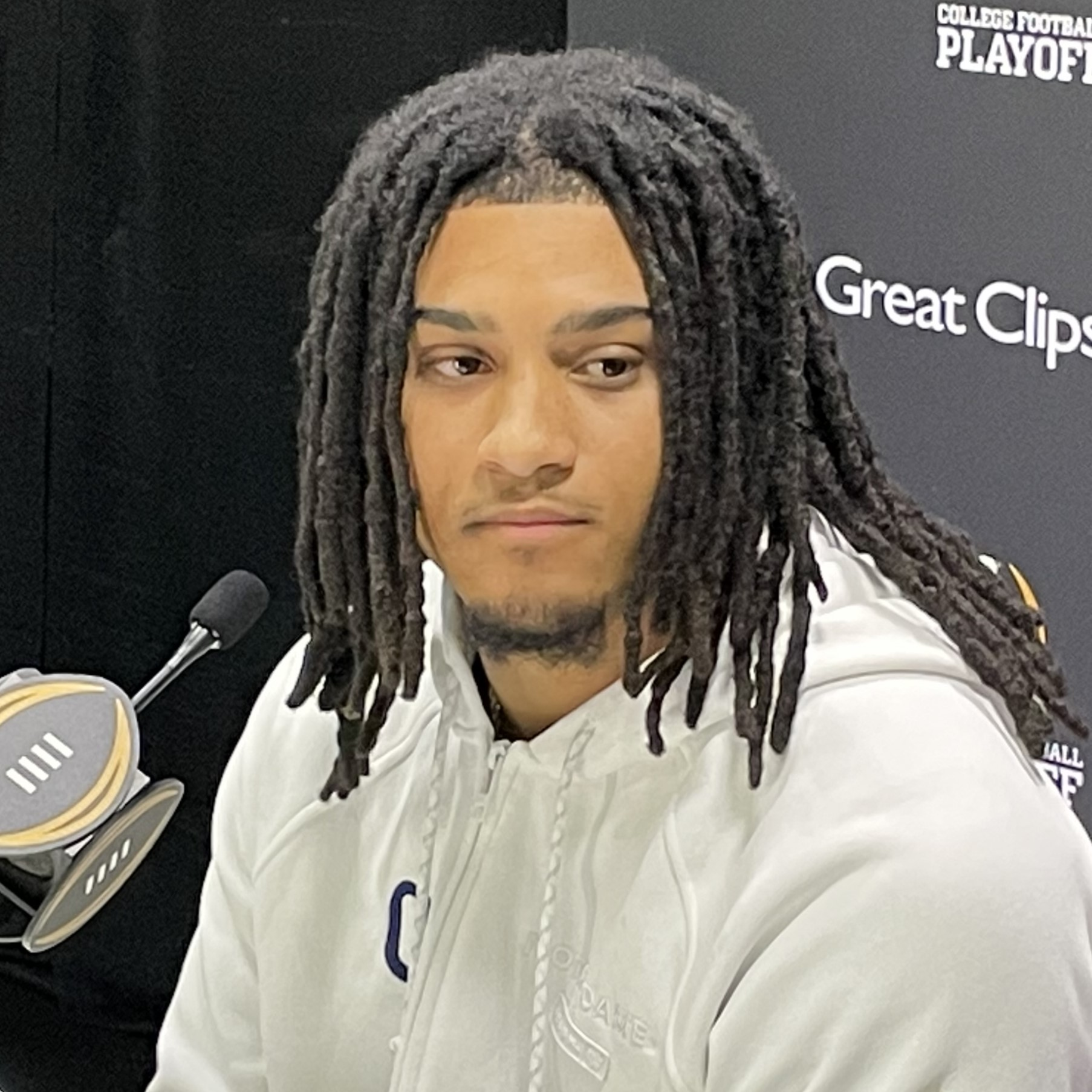
- Watts with the Notre Dame Fighting Irish in 2025

No. 31 – Atlanta Falcons
- Position: Safety
- Roster status: Active

Personal information
- Born: November 22, 2001 (age 24); Minneapolis, Minnesota, U.S.
- Listed height: 6 ft 0 in (1.83 m)
- Listed weight: 203 lb (92 kg)

Career information
- High school: Omaha Burke (Omaha, Nebraska)
- College: Notre Dame (2020–2024)
- NFL draft: 2025: 3rd round, 96th overall pick

Career history
- Atlanta Falcons (2025–present)

Awards and highlights
- PFWA All-Rookie Team (2025); Bronko Nagurski Trophy (2023); Unanimous All-American (2023); Consensus All-American (2024)

Career NFL statistics as of Week 5, 2026
- Tackles: 130
- Pass deflections: 13
- Interceptions: 6
- Forced fumbles: 1
- Fumble recoveries: 1
- Sacks: 0.5
- Stats at Pro Football Reference

Xavier Everett Carter Watts (born November 22, 2001) is an American professional football safety for the Atlanta Falcons of the National Football League (NFL). He played college football for the Notre Dame Fighting Irish, winning the Bronko Nagurski Trophy in 2023. Watts was selected by the Falcons in the third round of the 2025 NFL draft.

== Early life ==
Watts was born on November 22, 2001, in Minneapolis, Minnesota. He attended Omaha Burke High School in Omaha, Nebraska. In his career, he hauled in 163 receptions for 2,978 yards and 36 touchdowns, while also rushing for 88 yards and a touchdown. On defense Watts notched 136 tackles with 7.5 being for a loss, 13 pass deflections, nine interceptions, and one touchdown. He was ranked as the number two recruit in the state of Nebraska in the 2019 class. Watts committed to play college football at the University of Notre Dame as a wide receiver.

College recruiting
Name	Hometown	School	Height	Weight	Commit date
Xavier Watts; WR	Omaha, Nebraska	Harry A. Burke	6 ft 0 in (1.83 m)	185 lb (84 kg)	Jul 5, 2019
Xavier Watts; WR	Recruit ratings: Rivals: 247Sports: ESPN: (80)				

== College career ==
=== 2020 season ===
In the COVID-19 shortened 2020 season, Watts was given a redshirt after appearing in two games and recording no statistics.

=== 2021 season ===
During the start of the 2021 season, injuries to the linebacker position made it possible for Watts to switch from receiver to defense. He saw snaps at the "rover" position, a mix between safety and linebacker. Watts made his first defensive contribution against Virginia Tech, making three total tackles (one solo), in route to a 32–29 win. He also saw time at strong safety when Kyle Hamilton went down with a knee injury. Over 11 games, Watts had 15 total tackles (11 solo).

=== 2022 season ===
Watts entered the 2022 season as the backup safety to Brandon Joseph. In the Irish's game against Stanford, he had a career-high seven total tackles. In Week 11, Watts got his first career start against Navy where he recorded a career-high eight tackles. Two weeks later, he set a new career-high in tackles making nine against USC. Watts played in 13 games with four starts in 2022 finishing the season with 39 total tackles (24 solo) and four pass deflections.

=== 2023 season ===
In Week 2 of the 2023 season, Watts recorded his first career interception in a win over NC State, 45–24. In Week 5, he recorded another big interception that helped Notre Dame beat Duke, 21–14. In Week 7, Watts intercepted Caleb Williams on the first series of the game to help set up Notre Dame. Watts finished his career performance with seven tackles, two interceptions, a forced fumble, a fumble recovery, and a touchdown, as he helped the Fighting Irish upset No. 10 USC, 48–20. Watts finished the regular season with 47 total tackles (28 solo), four pass breakups, a forced fumble, and a defensive touchdown. He also had an NCAA-leading seven interceptions, which helped him win the 2023 Bronko Nagurski Trophy. Following the season, Watts was selected as a Unanimous All-American along with teammate Joe Alt.

=== 2024 season ===
Ahead of the 2024 season, Watts was named preseason All-American by the Associated Press, ESPN, The Sporting News, and USA Today. He was also named one of the five Fighting Irish team captains. During the season opener, Watts collected his first interception of the season to help Notre Dame beat No. 20 Texas A&M. Against No. 15 Louisville, he returned an interception 34 yards and forced a quarterback hurry that made the Cardinals turn the ball over on downs in the fourth quarter, sealing the 31–24 victory. During the final game of the season, Christian Gray intercepted one of USC quarterback Jayden Maiava's passes and returned it 99 yards for a touchdown, breaking Notre Dame's record for longest interception return. On the next drive, Watts picked off Maiava at the goal line, returning it for 100 yards and breaking Gray's record to help Notre Dame win 49–35.

After losing to Northern Illinois on September 7, Notre Dame won 10 straight games to make the College Football Playoff as the No. 7 seed, hosting No. 10 Indiana in the first round. After defeating Indiana, Notre Dame faced No. 2 Georgia in the Sugar Bowl, where Watts would be named Defensive MVP in the 23–10 win. Notre Dame would then defeat No. 6 Penn State in the Orange Bowl before losing to No. 8 Ohio State in the CFP National Championship.

Watts gained Consensus All-American status after being selected to the first team by four of the five selectors. On January 24, 2025, Watts declared for the 2025 NFL draft.

=== College statistics ===
Season	Team	Games		Tackles					Interceptions					Fumbles		
Season	Team	GP	GS	Solo	Ast	Cmb	TfL	Sck	Int	Yds	Avg	TD	PD	FR	FF	TD
2020	Notre Dame	2	0	Redshirt												
2021	Notre Dame	11	0	11	4	15	0.0	0.0	0	0	0.0	0	0	0	0	0
2022	Notre Dame	13	4	24	15	39	2.0	1.0	0	0	0.0	0	4	0	0	0
2023	Notre Dame	13	13	30	22	52	3.0	0.5	7	137	19.6	0	4	1	1	1
2024	Notre Dame	16	16	52	30	82	3.5	0.0	6	136	22.7	1	10	1	1	0
Career		55	33	117	71	188	8.5	1.5	13	273	21.0	1	18	2	2	1

== Professional career ==
=== Pre-draft ===
Pre-draft measurables
Height	Weight	Arm length	Hand span	Wingspan	40-yard dash	10-yard split	20-yard split	Vertical jump	Broad jump
5 ft 11 3/4 in (1.82 m)	204 lb (93 kg)	31 1/4 in (0.79 m)	8 5/8 in (0.22 m)	6 ft 4 1/2 in (1.94 m)	4.56 s	1.62 s	2.70 s	35.0 in (0.89 m)	9 ft 10 in (3.00 m)
All values from NFL Combine/Pro Day

=== 2025 season ===
Watts was selected by the Atlanta Falcons with the 96th pick in the third round of the 2025 NFL draft. On May 9, 2025, Watts signed a four-year, $6.19 million contract with the Falcons. In Week 1, Watts made his NFL debut against the Tampa Bay Buccaneers, totaling six solo tackles and two pass deflections in the Falcons' 20–23 loss. A week later, against the Minnesota Vikings, Watts got his first career interception off quarterback J. J. McCarthy. In Week 4 against the Washington Commanders, Watts intercepted backup quarterback Marcus Mariota. In the first month of the season, Watts collected 23 total tackles (17 solo), four pass deflections, and two interceptions, earning September Defensive Rookie of the Month honors.

On December 29, 2025, in Week 17 against the Los Angeles Rams, Watts intercepted quarterback Matthew Stafford twice and was a key defensive player in the 27-24 win.

== NFL career statistics ==
Year	Team	Games		Tackles					Interceptions						Fumbles			
Year	Team	GP	GS	Cmb	Solo	Ast	Sck	TFL	PD	Int	Yds	Avg	Lng	TD	FF	FR	Yds	TD
2025	ATL	17	17	96	59	37	0.0	0	11	5	32	6.4	32	0	0	1	5	0
2026	ATL	5	5	34	20	14	0.5	0	2	1	17	17.0	17	0	1	0	0	0
Career		22	22	130	79	51	0.5	0	13	6	49	8.2	32	0	1	1	5	0
