= William A. Walsh =

American football player, attorney, mayor, and judge (1871–1967)

William A. Walsh (August 18, 1871 – March 18, 1967) was an American football player for the University of Notre Dame, an attorney, and a mayor and city judge of Yonkers, New York.

During his senior year in 1895, Walsh played under head coach H. G. Hadden. His starts included shutout victories over Northwestern and Chicago Medical, but the team suffered a controversial defeat at the hands of Indianapolis Artillery, who featured Winchester Osgood at halfback, despite questions surrounding the former All-American's eligibility.

After graduation, Walsh entered the Georgetown Law School, where he obtained a law degree and thereafter spend ten years as a corporation counsel of the City of Mount Vernon. As a Democrat in 1917, he was appointed City Judge of Yonkers, New York, but lost his reelection bid to future gubernatorial candidate William F. Bleakley.

Despite the defeat, the Yonkers Common Council appointed Walsh to a position as corporation counsel from 1918 to 1922, and in 1926 he was elected to a two-year term as Mayor of Yonkers. He chose not to run for reelection and went into private practice.

Walsh returned to the political arena when the Common Council appointed him as City Manager in 1942 — a position that would also be held by his son, William A. Walsh Jr., in 1964.

Walsh died in 1967 at the age of 95.
