= Ledger Ritson =

English footballer

Personal information
- Full name: Ledger Ritson
- Date of birth: 28 April 1921
- Place of birth: Gateshead, England
- Date of death: March 1977 (aged 55)
- Place of death: Haringey, England
- Height: 5 ft 5 in (1.65 m)
- Position: Left back

Senior career*
Years	Team	Apps	(Gls)
–1946	Hitchin Town		
1946–1950	Leyton Orient	84	(0)
- * Club domestic league appearances and goals

Ledger Ritson (28 April 1921 – March 1977) was an English professional footballer who played in the Football League for Leyton Orient as a left back. After retiring from football, he jointly coached and advised the Leyton Orient reserve and 'A' teams with Syd Hobbins.

== Personal life ==
Ritson served in the British Army during the Second World War. His football career was ended by a broken right leg, during a training run at Leyton Stadium in December 1949, while rehabilitating without his doctor's knowledge after having suffered a compound fracture to the same leg three months earlier. Gangrene set in and the leg was amputated in January 1950.
