= Chris Cobbins =

American rapper

- Also known as: Chris Cobbins
- Born: Christopher Lee Cobbins; August 30, 1984 (age 41); Kansas City, Missouri, U.S.
- Genres: Christian hip hop, Christian R&B, contemporary R&B, urban contemporary gospel
- Occupations: Singer, songwriter
- Instrument: Vocals
- Years active: 2011–present
- Labels: Latebloom, Ryan's Brother Creations
- Website: chriscobbins.com

Christopher Lee Cobbins (born August 30, 1984), who goes by the stage name Chris Cobbins, is an American Christian hip hop musician and Christian R&B artist from Kansas City, Missouri. His debut album, Hello World, was released on October 8, 2013 by Latebloom Records. This album was his Billboard chart debut.

== Early life ==
Cobbins was born on August 30, 1984, as Christopher Lee Cobbins, in Kansas City, Missouri. His father, Otis L. Cobbins Jr, is the pastor of Bread of Life East Church, and his mother is Christina Cobbins. He has two brothers, Ryan and Matthew Cobbins, and he has a sister, O'lea Cobbins.

== Music career ==
His first studio album, Hello World, was released on October 8, 2013, with Latebloom Records. This was his debut album on the Billboard charts, and it happened to land a placement on Top Gospel Albums at No. 33. This will be his only album with the label, as he created his own imprint, Ryan's Brother Creations, which is to honor the death of his younger brother Ryan Terrell Cobbins.

== Personal life ==
Cobbins is married to TraShana Cobbins (Miller), and together they are presently residing in Kansas City, Missouri. Cobbins became a father with the birth of his son, Drew Otis Christopher Cobbins born October 29, 2014. Attended Raytown Senior High School. He is the cousin of former Notre Dame linebacker Lyron Cobbins and Trenyce.

== Discography ==
=== Studio albums ===
List of studio albums, with selected chart positions
Title	Album details	Peak chart positions
Title	Album details	US Gos
Hello World	Released: October 8, 2013; Label: Latebloom; CD, digital download	33
