= Syd Hobbins =

English footballer

Personal information
- Full name: Sydney George Hobbins
- Date of birth: 6 May 1916
- Place of birth: Plumstead, England
- Date of death: 16 March 1984 (aged 67)
- Place of death: Shooter's Hill, England
- Height: 5 ft 10 1/2 in (1.79 m)
- Position: Goalkeeper

Senior career*
Years	Team	Apps	(Gls)
–1934	Bromley		
1934–1948	Charlton Athletic	2	(0)
1948–1949	Millwall	15	(0)
1949	Leyton Orient	11	(0)
- * Club domestic league appearances and goals

Sydney George Hobbins (6 May 1916 – 16 March 1984) was an English professional footballer who played in the Football League for Millwall, Leyton Orient and Charlton Athletic as a goalkeeper. After retiring from football, he jointly coached and advised the Leyton Orient reserve and 'A' teams with Ledger Ritson. Hobbins founded Welling United in 1963.
