= Lyron Cobbins =

American football player (born 1974)

Profile
- Position: Linebacker

Personal information
- Born: September 17, 1974 (age 52); Kansas City, Kansas, U.S.

Career information
- College: Notre Dame
- NFL draft: 1997: undrafted

Career history
- Arizona Cardinals (1997)

Career NFL statistics
- Games played: 6
- Games started: 0
- -: -
- Stats at Pro Football Reference

Lyron Duryea Cobbins (born September 17, 1974) is an American former professional football player who was a linebacker for the Arizona Cardinals of the National Football League (NFL). After going to Wyandotte High School, Cobbins played college football for the Notre Dame Fighting Irish, and in his senior year was named Third-team All American. Cobbins made his NFL debut in the n 1997 with the Arizona Cardinals. He played for the Arizona Cardinals for his entire one-year career. He is the cousin of Stellar Award winner Chris Cobbins
