= Colorado College Tigers football, 1882–1899 =

American college football seasons

The Colorado College Tigers football program represented Colorado College of Colorado Springs, Colorado. The school was the first college in the Western United States to organize a college football program. This article covers the program's first two decades from 1882 to 1899.

Significant milestones in the period covered include the following:

- In 1882, Colorado College played and won its first game, defeating a team of volunteer firemen known as the Sigafus Hose Company.
- On April 11, 1885, Colorado College defeated the University of Denver, 12–0, in the first college football game played west of the Mississippi River.
- On November 28, 1889, Colorado College lost an intercollegiate game for the first time, falling by a 14–6 score in the first of what would become 90 rivalry games with the Colorado School of Mines.
- On November 29, 1890, Colorado College won a 44–0 victory over the first University of Colorado football team.
- In 1898, Washburn Field opened and became the home field for Colorado College football for the next 125 years.
- In 1899 and 1900, Colorado College won consecutive Colorado Football Association championships, defeating the University of Colorado both years.

== 1880s ==
=== 1882 ===
1882 Colorado College Tigers football
- Conference: Independent
- Record: 2–1
- Head coach: None

1882 college football records
	Conf.			Overall
Team	W	L	T	W		L		T
Yale		–		8	–	0	–	0
Colorado College		–		1	–	0	–	0
Navy		–		1	–	0	–	0
Richmond		–		1	–	0	–	0
Harvard		–		7	–	1	–	0
Fordham		–		7	–	1	–	0
Princeton		–		7	–	2	–	0
Wesleyan		–		3	–	1	–	0
Rutgers		–		6	–	4	–	0
Columbian University		–		0	–	0	–	1
Dartmouth		–		1	–	1	–	0
Lake Forest		–		1	–	1	–	0
Minnesota		–		1	–	1	–	0
Northwestern		–		1	–	1	–	0
Stevens		–		1	–	1	–	1
Amherst		–		2	–	3	–	0
Penn		–		2	–	4	–	0
CCNY		–		1	–	2	–	0
MIT		–		1	–	4	–	0
Randolph–Macon		–		0	–	1	–	0
Clifton AC		–		0	–	1	–	0
Lafayette		–		0	–	2	–	0
McGill		–		0	–	2	–	0
NYU		–		0	–	2	–	0
Massachusetts		–		0	–	3	–	0
Columbia		–		0	–	5	–	0

The 1882 Colorado College football team represented Colorado College during the 1882 college football season. In its first season of college football, the team played three games, compiling a 2–1 record, including two victories over a team of firefighters known as the Sigafus Hose Company.

Date	Opponent	Site	Result	Source
November 30	Sigafus Hose Company	Colorado Springs, CO	W 10–8	
December 16	Colorado Springs High School	Colorado Springs, CO	L (score unknown)	
December 25	Sigafus Hose Company	Colorado Springs, CO	W 3–2	

=== 1883 ===
1883 Colorado College Tigers football
- Conference: Independent
- Record: 1–1
- Head coach: E. B. Curtis

1883 college football records
	Conf.			Overall
Team	W	L	T	W		L		T
Yale		–		9	–	0	–	0
Gallaudet		–		2	–	0	–	0
Carleton		–		1	–	0	–	0
Johns Hopkins		–		1	–	0	–	0
NYU		–		1	–	0	–	0
Harvard		–		8	–	2	–	0
Princeton		–		7	–	1	–	0
Penn		–		6	–	2	–	1
Stevens		–		6	–	4	–	1
Massachusetts		–		1	–	1	–	0
Minnesota		–		1	–	1	–	0
Wesleyan		–		3	–	3	–	0
Williams		–		1	–	1	–	0
Fordham		–		4	–	5	–	0
Michigan		–		2	–	3	–	0
Lafayette		–		2	–	4	–	0
Johns Hopkins		–		1	–	2	–	0
Columbia		–		1	–	3	–	0
Rutgers		–		1	–	6	–	0
Amherst		–		0	–	1	–	0
Dartmouth		–		0	–	1	–	0
Hamline		–		0	–	1	–	0
Lewisburg		–		0	–	1	–	0
Navy		–		0	–	1	–	0
CCNY		–		0	–	2	–	0
Columbian University		–		0	–	2	–	0
Georgetown		–		0	–	2	–	0

The 1883 Colorado College football team represented Colorado College during the 1883 college football season. In its first season under head coach E. B. Curtis, the team played two games against the Crowell Hose Company and compiled a 1–1 record.

Date	Opponent	Site	Result	Source
November 27, 1883	Crowell Hose Company	Colorado Springs, CO	L 1–2	
April 1, 1884	Crowell Hose Company	Colorado Springs, CO	W 3–0	

=== 1884 ===
1884 Colorado College Tigers football
- Conference: Independent
- Record: 2–0
- Head coach: E. B. Curtis

1884 college football records
	Conf.			Overall
Team	W	L	T	W		L		T
Princeton		–		9	–	0	–	1
Yale		–		8	–	0	–	1
Michigan		–		2	–	0	–	0
Williams		–		2	–	0	–	0
Navy		–		1	–	0	–	0
Wabash		–		1	–	0	–	0
Penn		–		5	–	1	–	1
Fordham		–		5	–	1	–	0
Harvard		–		7	–	4	–	0
Wesleyan		–		3	–	2	–	0
Butler		–		1	–	1	–	0
Columbia		–		1	–	1	–	0
Rutgers		–		3	–	4	–	0
Stevens		–		4	–	5	–	0
Dartmouth		–		1	–	2	–	1
Tufts		–		2	–	4	–	1
Massachusetts		–		1	–	2	–	0
Lafayette		–		2	–	5	–	0
Johns Hopkins		–		1	–	3	–	0
Albion		–		0	–	1	–	0
CCNY		–		0	–	1	–	0
Denver		–		0	–	1	–	0
DePauw		–		0	–	1	–	0
Olivet		–		0	–	2	–	0
Amherst		–		0	–	3	–	0
Lehigh		–		0	–	4	–	0

The 1884 Colorado College football team represented Colorado College during the 1884 college football season. In its second and final season under head coach E. B. Curtis, the team played two games and compiled a 2–0 record. In its first game against a collegiate opponent, the team defeated the University of Denver by a 12–0 score on April 11, 1885.

Date	Opponent	Site	Result	Source
1884	Rolling Mill		W 1–0	
April 11, 1885	Denver	Colorado Springs Athletic Park; Colorado Springs, CO	W 12–0	

=== 1885 ===
1885 Colorado College Tigers football
- Conference: Independent
- Record: 2–0
- Head coach: R. D. McLeod

The 1885 Colorado College Tigers football team represented Colorado College during the 1885 college football season. In its first season under head coach R. D. McLeod, the team played two games against non-collegiate opponents and compiled a 2–0 record.

Date	Opponent	Site	Result	Source
	Colorado Springs High School		W 1–0	
	Crowell Hose Company		W 1–0	

=== 1886 ===
1886 Colorado College Tigers football
- Conference: Independent
- Record: 1–0
- Head coach: None

1886 Western college football independents records
	Conf.			Overall
Team	W	L	T	W		L		T
California		–		6	–	2	–	1
Colorado College		–		1	–	0	–	0

The 1886 Colorado College Tigers football team represented Colorado College as an independent during the 1886 college football season. The team scheduled one game against Colorado Springs High School, winning by a forfeit.

Date	Opponent	Site	Result	Source
	Colorado Springs High School		W 1–0 (forfeit0	

=== 1889 ===
1889 Colorado College Tigers football
- Conference: Independent
- Record: 0–1
- Head coach: None

1889 Far West college football independents records
	Conf.			Overall
Team	W	L	T	W		L		T
USC		–		2	–	0	–	0
California		–		0	–	0	–	0
Washington		–		0	–	1	–	0

The 1889 Colorado College Tigers football team represented Colorado College as an independent during the 1889 college football season. The team compiled a 0–1 record, losing for the first time in an intercollegiate game by a 14–6 score against the Colorado School of Mines.

Date	Opponent	Site	Result	Source
November 28	Colorado Mines	Colorado Springs, CO	L 6–14	

== 1890s ==
=== 1890 ===
1890 Colorado College Tigers football
- Conference: Independent
- Record: 4–1
- Head coach: None

1890 Far West college football independents records
	Conf.			Overall
Team	W	L	T	W		L		T
California		–		4	–	0	–	0
Washington		–		0	–	0	–	1
Colorado		–		0	–	4	–	0

The 1890 Colorado College Tigers football team represented Colorado College as an independent during the 1890 college football season. The team compiled a 4–1 record, including a 44–0 victory over 1890 Colorado Silver and Gold football team (the first team to represent the University of Colorado) on November 29, 1890.

Date	Opponent	Site	Result	Source
	Colorado Springs High School		W 20–0	
	Colorado Springs High School		W 5–0	
	Denver High School		W 20–12	
	Colorado Mines		L 0–44	
November 29	Colorado	Colorado Springs, CO	W 44–0	

=== 1891 ===
1891 Colorado College Tigers football
- Conference: Independent
- Record: 0–2
- Head coach: George K. Olmstead

1891 Far West college football independents records
	Conf.			Overall
Team	W	L	T	W		L		T
Stanford		–		3	–	1	–	0
California (spring)		–		4	–	2	–	0
Washington		–		1	–	1	–	0
USC		–		1	–	2	–	0
Colorado		–		1	–	4	–	0
California		–		0	–	1	–	0

The 1891 Colorado College Tigers football team represented Colorado College as an independent during the 1891 college football season. In its first season under head coach George K. Olmstead, the team compiled an 0–2 record, losing to both Colorado Mines and Colorado.

Date	Opponent	Site	Result	Source
	Colorado Mines		L 0–18	
November 26	Colorado	Colorado Springs, CO	L 4–24	

=== 1892 ===
1892 Colorado College Tigers football
- Conference: Independent
- Record: 2–1
- Head coach: George K. Olmstead

1892 Far West college football independents records
	Conf.			Overall
Team	W	L	T	W		L		T
Saint Mary's		–		1	–	0	–	0
Utah Agricultural		–		1	–	0	–	0
Stanford		–		1	–	0	–	2
California		–		2	–	1	–	1
Gonzaga		–		0	–	0	–	1
Washington		–		1	–	1	–	0
San Jose Normal		–		0	–	1	–	0
Utah		–		0	–	1	–	0

The 1892 Colorado College Tigers football team represented Colorado College as an independent during the 1892 college football season. In its second season under head coach George K. Olmstead, the team compiled a 2–1 record.

Date	Opponent	Site	Result	Source
	Colorado Hose Boys		L 0–14	
	Colorado Springs High School		W 34–0	
	Colorado Springs High School		W 18–14	

=== 1894 ===
1894 Colorado College Tigers football
- Conference: Colorado Football Association
- Record: 1–1 (0–1 CFA)
- Head coach: Harvey Noble (1st season)

1894 Colorado Football Association standings
	Conf.					Overall
Team	W		L		T	W		L		T
Colorado $	5	–	0	–	0	8	–	1	–	0
Colorado Mines	1	–	2	–	0	1	–	2	–	0
Denver	1	–	3	–	0	1	–	3	–	0
Colorado College	0	–	1	–	0	1	–	2	–	0
Colorado Agricultural	0	–	1	–	0	0	–	1	–	0
$ – Conference champion

The 1894 Colorado College Tigers football team represented Colorado College as a member of the Colorado Football Association (CFA) during the 1894 college football season. In its first and only season under head coach Harvey Noble, the team compiled a 1–1 record (0–1 against CFA opponents), outscored opponents by a total of 20 to 8, and tied for last place in the CFA.

Date	Opponent	Site	Result	Source
November 14	Pueblo High School	Colorado Springs, CO	W 20–0	
November 16	Denver	Colorado Springs, CO	L 0–8	

=== 1895 ===
1895 Colorado College Tigers football
- Conference: Colorado Football Association
- Record: 1–2–1 (0–2–1 CFA)
- Head coach: R. D. McLeod (2nd season)

1895 Colorado Football Association standings
	Conf.					Overall
Team	W		L		T	W		L		T
Colorado $	3	–	0	–	0	5	–	1	–	0
Colorado Mines	1	–	1	–	0	1	–	1	–	0
Denver	0	–	1	–	1	0	–	3	–	2
Colorado College	0	–	2	–	1	1	–	2	–	1
$ – Conference champion

The 1895 Colorado College Tigers football team represented Colorado College as a member of the Colorado Football Association (CFA) during the 1895 college football season. In its second and final season under head coach R. D. McLeod, the team compiled a 1–2–1 record, finished in last place in the CFA, and were outscored by a total of 82 to 32.

Date	Opponent	Site	Result	Source
	Colorado Springs High School*	Colorado Springs, CO	W 18–0	
	Colorado Mines		L 0–40	
November 16	Colorado	Colorado Springs, CO	L 10–38	
November 30	Denver	Colorado Springs, CO	T 4–4	
*Non-conference game

=== 1896 ===
1896 Colorado College Tigers football
- Conference: Colorado Football Association
- Record: 3–3–1 (0–2 CFA)
- Head coach: Pope Lamson (1st season)

1896 Colorado Football Association standings
	Conf.					Overall
Team	W		L		T	W		L		T
Colorado $	2	–	0	–	0	5	–	0	–	0
Colorado Mines	1	–	1	–	0	1	–	2	–	0
Colorado College	0	–	2	–	0	3	–	4	–	0
$ – Conference champion

The 1896 Colorado College Tigers football team represented Colorado College as a member of the Colorado Football Association (CFA) during the 1896 college football season. In its first and only season under head coach Pope Lamson, the team compiled a 3–3–1 record (0–2 against conference opponents), finished in last place in the CFA, and were outscored by a total of 102 to 44.

Date	Opponent	Site	Result	Source
October 24	Denver East High School	Colorado Springs, CO	W 6–4	
October 31	at Pueblo High School	Pueblo, CO	T 6–6	
November 3	Denver Athletic Club	Colorado Springs, CO	L 0–24	
November 14	at Colorado	Boulder, CO	L 0–50	
November 18	Pikes Peak Roadsters	Colorado Springs, CO	W 18–0	
November 21	Denver	Colorado Springs, CO	W 12–0	
November 26	Colorado Mines	Colorado Springs, CO	L 2–18	

=== 1897 ===
1897 Colorado College Tigers football
- Conference: Colorado Football Association
- Record: 3–5 (0–2 CFA)
- Head coach: Browning Smith (1st season)

1897 Colorado Football Association standings
	Conf.					Overall
Team	W		L		T	W		L		T
Colorado $	2	–	0	–	0	7	–	1	–	0
Colorado Mines	1	–	1	–	0	2	–	2	–	0
Colorado College	0	–	2	–	0	3	–	5	–	0
$ – Conference champion

The 1897 Colorado College Tigers football team represented Colorado College as a member of the Colorado Football Association (CFA) during the 1897 college football season. In its first and only season under head coach Browning Smith, the team compiled a 3–5 record (0–2 against conference opponents) and finished in last place in the CFA.

Date	Opponent	Site	Result	Source
	Colorado Springs High School	Colorado Springs, CO	L 0–6	
	Pueblo Centennial High School		W 60–0	
	Pueblo High School		W 24–0	
October 17	Colorado	Colorado Springs, CO	L 0–8	
	Denver Athletic Club		L 0–28	
	Colorado Mines		L 0–30	
November 16	Ottawa (KS)	Colorado Springs, CO	W 5–4	

=== 1898 ===
1898 Colorado College Tigers football
- Conference: Colorado Football Association
- Record: 5–1–1 (1–1 CFA)
- Head coach: Charles Wilson (1st season)

1898 Colorado Football Association standings
	Conf.					Overall
Team	W		L		T	W		L		T
Colorado Mines $	2	–	0	–	0	8	–	0	–	0
Colorado College	1	–	1	–	0	5	–	1	–	1
Colorado	0	–	2	–	0	4	–	4	–	0
$ – Conference champion

The 1898 Colorado College Tigers football team represented Colorado College as a member of the Colorado Football Association (CFA) during the 1898 college football season. In its first and only season under head coach Charles Wilson, the team compiled a 5–1–1 record (1–1 against conference opponents), finished in second place in the CFA, shut out six of seven opponents, and outscored all opponents by a total of 129 to 6.

Date	Opponent	Site	Result	Source
October 1	Denver North High School*	Colorado Springs, CO	W 24–0	
October 22	Colorado	Colorado Springs, CO	W 22–0	
	Denver Wheel Club*		W 11–0	
	Denver Athletic Club*		W 5–0	
	Denver Athletic Club*		T 0–0	
November 25	Colorado Mines		L 2–6	
	Denver*		W 65–0	
*Non-conference game

=== 1899 ===
1899 Colorado College Tigers football

CFA champion
- Conference: Colorado Football Association
- Record: 3–2–1 (2–0 CFA)
- Head coach: John Clark (1st season)
- Home stadium: Washburn Field

1899 Colorado Football Association standings
	Conf.					Overall
Team	W		L		T	W		L		T
Colorado College $	2	–	0	–	0	3	–	2	–	1
Colorado	2	–	1	–	0	7	–	2	–	0
Colorado Mines	1	–	2	–	0	2	–	3	–	0
Colorado Agricultural	0	–	2	–	0	0	–	2	–	1
$ – Conference champion

The 1899 Colorado College Tigers football team represented Colorado College as a member of the Colorado Football Association (CFA) during the 1899 college football season. In its first and only season under head coach John Clark, the team compiled a 3–2–1 record (2–0 against conference opponents), won the CFA championship, and outscored opponents by a total of 96 to 28.

Date	Opponent	Site	Result	Source
October 7	Denver East High School*	Washburn Field; Colorado Springs, CO	W 41–0	
October 14	Denver Athletic Club*	Denver, CO	L 10–5 (forfeit)	
October 21	Denver Wheel Club*	Washburn Field; Colorado Springs, CO	T 6–6	
November 4	Denver Wheel Club*	Washburn Field; Colorado Springs, CO	L 5–12	
November 22	at Colorado	Boulder, CO	W 17–5	
November 30	Colorado Mines	Washburn Field; Colorado Springs, CO	W 17–0	
*Non-conference game
