= List of Colorado Football Association standings =

This is a list of yearly Colorado Football Association standings.

== Standings ==
1890 Colorado Football Association standings
	Conf.					Overall
Team	W		L		T	W		L		T
Colorado Mines $	3	–	0	–	0	6	–	0	–	0
Denver	2	–	1	–	0	3	–	2	–	0
Colorado College	1	–	2	–	0	2	–	3	–	0
Colorado	0	–	3	–	0	1	–	6	–	0
$ – Conference champion

1891 Colorado Football Association standings
	Conf.			Overall
Team	W	L	T	W		L		T
Colorado Mines $		–		5	–	1	–	1
$ – Conference champion

1892 Colorado Football Association standings
	Conf.			Overall
Team	W	L	T	W		L		T
Colorado Mines $		–				–
Colorado		–		3	–	2	–	0
Colorado Agricultural		–		2	–	2	–	0
$ – Conference champion

1893 Colorado Football Association standings
	Conf.					Overall
Team	W		L		T	W		L		T
Colorado Mines $	3	–	0	–	0	4	–	1	–	0
Colorado	1	–	1	–	0	2	–	3	–	0
Colorado Agricultural	1	–	3	–	0	1	–	3	–	0
Denver	0	–	2	–	0	1	–	2	–	0
$ – Conference champion

1894 Colorado Football Association standings
	Conf.					Overall
Team	W		L		T	W		L		T
Colorado $	5	–	0	–	0	8	–	1	–	0
Colorado Mines	1	–	2	–	0	1	–	2	–	0
Denver	1	–	3	–	0	1	–	3	–	0
Colorado College	0	–	1	–	0	1	–	2	–	0
Colorado Agricultural	0	–	1	–	0	0	–	1	–	0
$ – Conference champion

1895 Colorado Football Association standings
	Conf.					Overall
Team	W		L		T	W		L		T
Colorado $	3	–	0	–	0	5	–	1	–	0
Colorado Mines	1	–	1	–	0	1	–	1	–	0
Denver	0	–	1	–	1	0	–	3	–	2
Colorado College	0	–	2	–	1	1	–	2	–	1
$ – Conference champion

1896 Colorado Football Association standings
	Conf.					Overall
Team	W		L		T	W		L		T
Colorado $	2	–	0	–	0	5	–	0	–	0
Colorado Mines	1	–	1	–	0	1	–	2	–	0
Colorado College	0	–	2	–	0	3	–	4	–	0
$ – Conference champion

1897 Colorado Football Association standings
	Conf.					Overall
Team	W		L		T	W		L		T
Colorado $	2	–	0	–	0	7	–	1	–	0
Colorado Mines	1	–	1	–	0	2	–	2	–	0
Colorado College	0	–	2	–	0	3	–	5	–	0
$ – Conference champion

1898 Colorado Football Association standings
	Conf.					Overall
Team	W		L		T	W		L		T
Colorado Mines $	2	–	0	–	0	8	–	0	–	0
Colorado College	1	–	1	–	0	5	–	1	–	1
Colorado	0	–	2	–	0	4	–	4	–	0
$ – Conference champion

1899 Colorado Football Association standings
	Conf.					Overall
Team	W		L		T	W		L		T
Colorado College $	2	–	0	–	0	3	–	2	–	1
Colorado	2	–	1	–	0	7	–	2	–	0
Colorado Mines	1	–	2	–	0	2	–	3	–	0
Colorado Agricultural	0	–	2	–	0	0	–	2	–	1
$ – Conference champion

1900 Colorado Football Association standings
	Conf.					Overall
Team	W		L		T	W		L		T
Colorado College $	3	–	0	–	0	6	–	2	–	0
Colorado Mines	2	–	1	–	0	4	–	3	–	0
Colorado	1	–	2	–	0	6	–	4	–	0
Colorado Agricultural	0	–	3	–	0	1	–	3	–	0
$ – Conference champion

1901 Colorado Football Association standings
	Conf.					Overall
Team	W		L		T	W		L		T
Colorado $	2	–	0	–	0	5	–	1	–	1
Colorado College	2	–	1	–	0	5	–	1	–	0
Colorado Mines	1	–	2	–	0	1	–	4	–	0
Colorado Agricultural	0	–	2	–	0	1	–	2	–	0
$ – Conference champion; Colorado vs. Colorado Agricultural game not played due to alleged amateurism violation

1902 Colorado Football Association standings
	Conf.					Overall
Team	W		L		T	W		L		T
Colorado $	4	–	0	–	0	5	–	1	–	0
Colorado Mines	2	–	1	–	1	4	–	1	–	2
Colorado College	2	–	2	–	0	3	–	4	–	0
Denver	1	–	3	–	0	3	–	4	–	1
Colorado Agricultural	0	–	3	–	1	1	–	3	–	2
$ – Conference champion

1903 Colorado Football Association standings
	Conf.					Overall
Team	W		L		T	W		L		T
Colorado $	4	–	0	–	0	8	–	2	–	0
Colorado Agricultural	3	–	1	–	0	5	–	1	–	0
Colorado Mines	2	–	2	–	0	3	–	4	–	0
Colorado College	1	–	3	–	0	4	–	5	–	0
Denver	0	–	4	–	0	6	–	7	–	0
$ – Conference champion

1904 Colorado Football Association standings
	Conf.					Overall
Team	W		L		T	W		L		T
Colorado Mines $	3	–	0	–	1	3	–	0	–	1
Colorado	3	–	1	–	0	6	–	2	–	1
Denver	2	–	2	–	0	2	–	5	–	0
Colorado College	1	–	2	–	1	6	–	3	–	1
Colorado Agricultural	0	–	4	–	0	0	–	4	–	1
$ – Conference champion

1906 Colorado Football Association standings
	Conf.					Overall
Team	W		L		T	W		L		T
Colorado Mines $	2	–	0	–	2	2	–	0	–	2
Colorado	1	–	1	–	2	2	–	3	–	4
Denver	2	–	2	–	0	2	–	3	–	0
Colorado College	1	–	2	–	1	3	–	2	–	2
Colorado Agricultural	1	–	2	–	1	1	–	2	–	1
$ – Conference champion

1907 Colorado Football Association standings
	Conf.					Overall
Team	W		L		T	W		L		T
Colorado Mines $	4	–	0	–	0	5	–	1	–	0
Colorado College	3	–	1	–	0	5	–	2	–	0
Colorado	2	–	2	–	0	5	–	3	–	0
Denver	1	–	3	–	0	2	–	6	–	0
Colorado Agricultural	0	–	4	–	0	0	–	4	–	0
$ – Conference champion

1908 Colorado Football Association standings
	Conf.					Overall
Team	W		L		T	W		L		T
Denver $	4	–	0	–	0	7	–	1	–	0
Colorado	3	–	1	–	0	5	–	2	–	0
Colorado College	2	–	1	–	0	6	–	1	–	0
Colorado Agricultural	0	–	2	–	0	1	–	3	–	0
Colorado Mines	0	–	3	–	0	2	–	3	–	0
$ – Conference champion
