= Lehigh football, 1884–1889 =

American college football season

The Lehigh football team (later known as the Lehigh Mountain Hawks) represented Lehigh University of Bethlehem, Pennsylvania, in American football. Significant points in this, the first decade of Lehigh football, included the following:

- The Lehigh football program started on October 25, 1884, with a 50–0 loss to Lafayette. The team lost all four games in 1884 by a combined score of 181 to 16.
- Lehigh won its first intercollegiate football game on November 14, 1885, defeating Rutgers by a 10–5 score.
- Lehigh's first winning season was in 1886 when the team compiled a 4–3–1 record.
- The 1888 team became one of the sport's leading teams, compiling a 10–2 record and shutting out seven oppoinents, including Bucknell (74–0), Rutgers (30–0), Penn State (30–0), and Cornell (4–0).
- On November 11, 1889, Lehigh shut out Penn State, 106–0, the worst defeat in the history of the Penn State football program.

The Lehigh football team did not have a coach during the 1880s.

== 1884 ==
1884 Lehigh football
- Conference: Independent
- Record: 0–4
- Head coach: None

1884 college football records
	Conf.			Overall
Team	W	L	T	W		L		T
Princeton		–		9	–	0	–	1
Yale		–		8	–	0	–	1
Michigan		–		2	–	0	–	0
Williams		–		2	–	0	–	0
Navy		–		1	–	0	–	0
Wabash		–		1	–	0	–	0
Penn		–		5	–	1	–	1
Fordham		–		5	–	1	–	0
Harvard		–		7	–	4	–	0
Wesleyan		–		3	–	2	–	0
Butler		–		1	–	1	–	0
Columbia		–		1	–	1	–	0
Rutgers		–		3	–	4	–	0
Stevens		–		4	–	5	–	0
Dartmouth		–		1	–	2	–	1
Tufts		–		2	–	4	–	1
Massachusetts		–		1	–	2	–	0
Lafayette		–		2	–	5	–	0
Johns Hopkins		–		1	–	3	–	0
Albion		–		0	–	1	–	0
CCNY		–		0	–	1	–	0
Denver		–		0	–	1	–	0
DePauw		–		0	–	1	–	0
Olivet		–		0	–	2	–	0
Amherst		–		0	–	3	–	0
Lehigh		–		0	–	4	–	0

The 1884 Lehigh football team represented Lehigh University in the 1884 college football season. The team compiled an 0–4 record.

== Schedule ==
Date	Opponent	Site	Result
October 25	at Lafayette	The Quad; Easton, PA (The Rivalry)	L 0–50
November 1	at Rutgers	New Brunswick, NJ	L 0–61
November 12	Lafayette	Bethlehem, PA	L 4–34
November 15	Haverford	Bethlehem, PA	L 12–36

== 1885 ==
1885 Lehigh football
- Conference: Independent
- Record: 1–5–1
- Head coach: None

1885 college football records
	Conf.			Overall
Team	W	L	T	W		L		T
Princeton		–		9	–	0	–	0
Michigan		–		3	–	0	–	0
Colorado College		–		1	–	0	–	0
Yale		–		7	–	1	–	0
Cincinnati		–		1	–	0	–	1
Penn		–		8	–	5	–	0
Lafayette		–		3	–	2	–	1
Massachusetts		–		3	–	2	–	1
Johns Hopkins		–		2	–	2	–	0
Richmond		–		1	–	1	–	0
Wesleyan		–		3	–	4	–	0
Navy		–		1	–	2	–	0
Lehigh		–		1	–	5	–	1
Rutgers		–		0	–	1	–	0
Fordham		–		0	–	3	–	0

The 1885 Lehigh football team represented Lehigh University in the 1885 college football season. The team compiled a 1–5–1 record.

=== Schedule ===
Date	Time	Opponent	Site	Result	Attendance	Source
October 10	3:05 p.m.	at Penn	University Athletic Grounds; Philadelphia, PA	L 0–54	500	
October 17		at Haverford	University Athletic Grounds; Bethlehem, PA	L 8–24		
October 31		Lafayette	University Athletic Grounds; Bethlehem, PA (The Rivalry)	L 0–6 (forfeit)		
November 7		Stevens	Bethlehem, PA	L 4–20		
November 14		Rutgers	Bethlehem, PA	W 10–5		
November 18	2:30 p.m.	Penn	Bethlehem, PA	L 0–35		
November 21		at Lafayette	Easton, PA	T 6–6		

== 1886 ==
1886 Lehigh football
- Conference: Independent
- Record: 4–3–1
- Head coach: None

1886 Eastern college football independents records
	Conf.			Overall
Team	W	L	T	W		L		T
Yale		–		9	–	0	–	1
Princeton		–		7	–	0	–	1
Harvard		–		12	–	2	–	0
Lafayette		–		10	–	2	–	0
Williams		–		5	–	1	–	1
Massachusetts		–		2	–	1	–	0
Penn		–		9	–	7	–	1
Lehigh		–		4	–	3	–	1
Dartmouth		–		2	–	2	–	0
Rutgers		–		1	–	3	–	0
Wesleyan		–		2	–	6	–	0
Vermont		–		0	–	1	–	0
Stevens		–		0	–	7	–	1
Tufts		–		0	–	8	–	0
NYU		–		0	–	3	–	0
Swarthmore		–				–
Trinity (CT)		–				–

The 1886 Lehigh football team represented Lehigh University in the 1886 college football season. The team compiled a 4–3–1 record.

=== Schedule ===
Date	Time	Opponent	Site	Result	Attendance	Source
October 9	3:20 p.m.	at Penn	University Athletic Grounds; Philadelphia, PA	L 4–26	200	
October 16		at Dickinson	Carlisle, PA	W 26–0		
October 30		at Stevens	Hoboken, NJ	T 0–0		
November 6		at Lafayette	Easton, PA (The Rivalry)	L 0–12		
November 13		Stevens	Bethlehem, PA	W 14–0		
November 18		Penn	Bethlehem, PA	W 28–0		
November 20		Haverford	Bethlehem, PA	W 18–4		
November 24		Lafayette	Bethlehem, PA	L 0–4		

== 1887 ==
1887 Lehigh football
- Conference: Independent
- Record: 4–3
- Head coach: None

1887 Eastern college football independents records
	Conf.			Overall
Team	W	L	T	W		L		T
Yale		–		9	–	0	–	0
Penn State		–		2	–	0	–	0
Harvard		–		10	–	1	–	0
Lafayette		–		7	–	2	–	0
Princeton		–		7	–	2	–	0
Lehigh		–		4	–	3	–	0
Williams		–		3	–	3	–	0
Penn		–		6	–	7	–	0
Wesleyan		–		4	–	5	–	0
Tufts		–		4	–	6	–	0
Massachusetts		–		2	–	3	–	0
Rutgers		–		2	–	6	–	0
Bucknell		–		0	–	2	–	0
Cornell		–		0	–	2	–	0
Franklin & Marshall		–		0	–	2	–	0
Vermont		–		0	–	2	–	0

The 1887 Lehigh football team represented Lehigh University in the 1887 college football season. The team compiled a 4–3 record.

=== Schedule ===
Date	Opponent	Site	Result	Source
October 8	Swarthmore	Bethlehem, PA	W 24–0	
October 15	at Princeton	University Field; Princeton, NJ	L 0–80	
October 22	Dickinson	County Fair Grounds; Carlisle, PA	W 20–0	
October 29	Lafayette	Bethlehem, PA (The Rivalry)	W 10–4	
November 12	at Penn	Philadelphia, PA	L 4–6	
November 23	at Lafayette	The Quad; Easton, PA	L 0–6	
November 26	vs. Cornell	Elmira, NY	W 38–10	

== 1888 ==
1888 Lehigh football
- Conference: Independent
- Record: 10–2
- Head coach: None

1888 Eastern college football independents records
	Conf.			Overall
Team	W	L	T	W		L		T
Yale		–		13	–	0	–	0
Harvard		–		12	–	1	–	0
Princeton		–		11	–	1	–	0
Lehigh		–		10	–	2	–	0
Trinity (CT)		–		5	–	1	–	1
Lafayette		–		6	–	3	–	0
Cornell		–		4	–	2	–	0
Penn		–		9	–	7	–	0
Bucknell		–		2	–	3	–	0
Fordham		–		1	–	2	–	0
Massachusetts		–		2	–	5	–	0
Worcester Tech		–		2	–	5	–	0
Wesleyan		–		2	–	7	–	0
Rutgers		–		1	–	6	–	1
Penn State		–		0	–	2	–	1
Swarthmore		–		0	–	5	–	0

The 1888 Lehigh football team represented Lehigh University in the 1888 college football season. The team compiled a 10–2 record.

=== Schedule ===
Date	Time	Opponent	Site	Result	Source
September 29		at Princeton	University Field; Princeton, NJ	L 0–75	
October 6		Swarthmore	Swarthmore, PA	W 12–8	
October 11		Bucknell	Bethlehem, PA	W 74–0	
October 13		Rutgers	Bethlehem, PA	W 30–0	
October 17		Haverford	Bethlehem, PA	W 16–6	
October 20		Swarthmore	Bethlehem, PA	W 50–0	
October 27	3:25 p.m.	Penn	Bethlehem, PA	L 0–36	
November 3		at Penn State	Old Main; State College, PA	W 30–0	
November 10		Stevens	Bethlehem, PA	W 10–0	
November 17		at Lafayette	The Quad; Easton, PA (The Rivalry)	W 6–4	
November 27		Lafayette	Bethlehem, PA	W 16–0	
December 1		at Cornell	Elmira, NY	W 4–0	

== 1889 ==
1889 Lehigh football
- Conference: Independent
- Record: 8–3–2
- Head coach: None

1889 Eastern college football independents records
	Conf.			Overall
Team	W	L	T	W		L		T
Princeton		–		10	–	0	–	0
Massachusetts		–		2	–	0	–	0
Yale		–		15	–	1	–	0
Harvard		–		9	–	2	–	0
Franklin & Marshall		–		5	–	1	–	1
Dickinson		–		4	–	1	–	1
Navy		–		4	–	1	–	1
Tufts		–		3	–	1	–	0
Lehigh		–		8	–	3	–	2
Cornell		–		8	–	4	–	0
Penn		–		7	–	6	–	0
Brown		–		2	–	2	–	0
Penn State		–		2	–	2	–	0
Wesleyan		–		5	–	7	–	1
Bucknell		–		2	–	3	–	1
Lafayette		–		3	–	4	–	2
Columbia		–		2	–	7	–	2
Fordham		–		1	–	3	–	0
Rutgers		–		1	–	4	–	0
NYU		–		0	–	2	–	0

The 1889 Lehigh football team represented Lehigh University as an independent during the 1889 college football season. The team compiled an 8–3–2 record.

=== Schedule ===
Date	Time	Opponent	Site	Result	Attendance	Source
October 5	2:40 p.m.	at Princeton	Princeton, NJ	L 0–16		
October 10		Princeton	Bethlehem, PA	L 4–16		
October 16	3:30 p.m.	Haverford	Athletic Association's grounds; South Bethlehem, PA	W 60–0		
October 19	3:15 p.m.	at Penn	University Athletic Grounds; Philadelphia, PA	L 4–6		
October 30		Lafayette	University grounds; South Bethlehem, PA (The Rivalry)	W 16–10		
November 2		at Columbia	Berkeley Oval; New York, NY	W 51–6	1,500	
November 11		Penn State	South Bethlehem, PA	W 106–0		
November 16		at Lafayette	The Quad; Easton, PA	T 6–6	2,000	
November 20		Penn	Bethlehem, PA	W 8–0		
November 22		vs. Wesleyan	Hampden Park; Springfield, MA	T 11–11		
November 28	10:45 a.m.	at Navy	Annapolis, MD	W 26–6		
November 29	3:38 p.m.	vs. Johns Hopkins	Capitol Park; Washington, DC	W 40–0	1,000	
November 30		at Virginia	Madison Hall Field; Charlottesville, VA	W 26–12		
