= 1899 Colorado Silver and Gold football team =

American college football season

1899 Colorado Silver and Gold football
- Conference: Colorado Football Association
- Record: 7–2 (2–1 CFA)
- Head coach: Fred Folsom (5th season)
- Captain: Harold Garwood

1899 Colorado Football Association standings
| | Conf. | | | | | Overall |
| Team | W | | L | | T | W | | L | | T |
|---|---|---|---|---|---|---|---|---|---|---|
| Colorado College $ | 2 | – | 0 | – | 0 | 3 | – | 2 | – | 1 |
| Colorado | 2 | – | 1 | – | 0 | 7 | – | 2 | – | 0 |
| Colorado Mines | 1 | – | 2 | – | 0 | 2 | – | 3 | – | 0 |
| Colorado Agricultural | 0 | – | 2 | – | 0 | 0 | – | 2 | – | 1 |
$ – Conference champion

The 1899 Colorado Silver and Gold football team was an American football team that represented the University of Colorado as a member of the Colorado Football Association (CFA) during the 1899 college football season. Led by fifth-year head coach Fred Folsom, Colorado compiled an overall record of 7–2 with a mark of 2–1 in conference play, placing second in the CFA.

== Schedule ==
| Date | Opponent | Site | Result |
|---|---|---|---|
| September 20 | State Prep School* | Boulder, CO | W 6–0 |
| September 27 | Manual High School* | Boulder, CO | W 46–0 |
| October 3 | West High School* | Boulder, CO | W 21–0 |
| October 10 | at East High School* | Denver, CO | W 33–0 |
| October 15 | at Colorado Agricultural | Fort Collins, CO (rivalry) | W 63–0 |
| October 23 | at Denver Wheel Club* | Denver, CO | W 5–0 |
| October 31 | Colorado Mines | Boulder, CO | W 25–6 |
| November 7 | at Colorado College | Colorado Springs, CO | L 5–17 |
| November 30 | at Denver Athletic Club* | Denver, CO | L 6–11 |
*Non-conference game
