= Fred Folsom =

American football coach (1873–1944)

Biographical details
- Born: November 9, 1873; Old Town, Maine, U.S.
- Died: November 11, 1944 (aged 71); Hines, Illinois, U.S.

Playing career

Football
- 1892–1894: Dartmouth
- Position: End

Coaching career (HC unless noted)

Football
- 1895–1899: Colorado
- 1901–1902: Colorado
- 1903–1906: Dartmouth
- 1908–1915: Colorado

Baseball
- 1898–1899: Colorado

Head coaching record
- Overall: 106–28–6 (football); 6–6 (baseball)

Accomplishments and honors

Championships
- Football; 5 CFA (1895–1897, 1901–1902); 4 CFAC/RMC (1909–1911, 1913)

Fred Gorham Folsom (November 9, 1873 – November 11, 1944) was an American football player, coach of football and baseball, lawyer, and law professor. He served as the head football coach at the University of Colorado Boulder (1895–1899, 1901–1902, 1908–1915) and at Dartmouth College from (1903–1906), compiling a career college football record of 106–28–6. Folsom played football at Dartmouth from 1892 to 1894. He was also the head baseball coach at Colorado in 1898 and 1899, tallying a mark of 6–6. Folsom practiced law in Denver and Boulder and taught at the University of Colorado Law School from 1905 to 1943. The football stadium at the University of Colorado, originally named Colorado Stadium, was renamed as Folsom Field in his honor in 1944.

== Early life and education ==
Folsom was born to Franklin W. Folsom and Lillian A. Hopkins in Old Town, Maine on November 9, 1873. He graduated from Dartmouth in 1895 and earned an LLB from the University of Colorado in 1899.

== Head coaching record ==
=== Football ===
Year	Team	Overall	Conference	Standing
Colorado Silver and Gold (Colorado Football Association) (1895–1899)
1895	Colorado	4–1 (Note: Folsom became Colorado's head coach before the second game of the 1895 season. The team had no head coach in the season opener, a 42–0 victory over Denver Manual High School.)	3–0	1st
1896	Colorado	5–0	2–0	1st
1897	Colorado	7–1	2–0	1st
1898	Colorado	4–4	0–2	3rd
1899	Colorado	7–2	2–1	2nd
Colorado Silver and Gold (Colorado Football Association) (1901–1902)
1901	Colorado	5–1–1	2–0	1st
1902	Colorado	5–1	4–0	1st
Dartmouth (Independent) (1903–1906)
1903	Dartmouth	9–1		
1904	Dartmouth	7–0–1		
1905	Dartmouth	7–1–2		
1906	Dartmouth	6–3–1		
Dartmouth:		29–5–4		
Colorado Silver and Gold (Colorado Football Association) (1908)
1908	Colorado	5–2	3–1	2nd
Colorado Silver and Gold (Colorado Faculty Athletic Conference / Rocky Mountain Conference) (1909–1915)
1909	Colorado	6–0	3–0	1st
1910	Colorado	6–0	3–0	1st
1911	Colorado	6–0	4–0	1st
1912	Colorado	6–3	3–2	T–3rd
1913	Colorado	5–1–1	3–0–1	1st
1914	Colorado	5–1	4–1	2nd
1915	Colorado	1–6	1–5	T–6th
Colorado:		77–23–2	39–12–1	
Total:		106–28–6		
National championship Conference title Conference division title or championship game berth

== See also ==
- List of college football head coaches with non-consecutive tenure
