= Durand W. Springer =

American football coach and college faculty member

Biographical details
- Born: August 9, 1866; Durand, Wisconsin, U.S.
- Died: May 18, 1943 (aged 76); Ann Arbor, Michigan, U.S.
- Education: Albion College

Coaching career (HC unless noted)
- 1884: Albion
- 1898: Ann Arbor HS (MI) (manager)

Head coaching record
- Overall: 2–1

Durand William Springer (August 9, 1866 – May 18, 1943) was an American educator, accountant, and football coach. He was a student-coach at Albion College in Albion, Michigan in 1884. After graduating, he took on a number of roles at the University of Michigan. Springer was named the manager of the football squad at Ann Arbor High School in 1898. He later worked as an auditor for the University of Michigan and was the first president of the American Association of Certified public accountants. Springer died on May 18, 1943, in Ann Arbor, Michigan.

== Head coaching record ==
Year	Team	Overall	Conference	Standing	Bowl/playoffs
Albion (Independent) (1884)
1884	Albion	2–1			
Albion:		2–1			
Total:		2–1			
