= 1898 Colorado Silver and Gold football team =

American college football season

1898 Colorado Silver and Gold football
- Conference: Colorado Football Association
- Record: 4–4 (0–2 CFA)
- Head coach: Fred Folsom (4th season)
- Captain: Harry Chase

1898 Colorado Football Association standings
	Conf.					Overall
Team	W		L		T	W		L		T
Colorado Mines $	2	–	0	–	0	8	–	0	–	0
Colorado College	1	–	1	–	0	5	–	1	–	1
Colorado	0	–	2	–	0	4	–	4	–	0
$ – Conference champion

The 1898 Colorado Silver and Gold football team was an American football team that represented the University of Colorado as a member of the Colorado Football Association (CFA) during the 1898 college football season. Led by fourth-year head coach Fred Folsom, Colorado compiled an overall record of 4–4 with a mark of 0–2 in conference play, finishing last out of three teams in the CFA.

== Schedule ==
Date	Opponent	Site	Result
October 8	North High School*	Boulder, CO	W 41–0
October 15	East High School*	Boulder, CO	W 42–0
October 22	at Colorado College	Colorado Springs, CO	L 0–22
October 29	at Denver Athletic Club*	Denver, CO	L 5–11
November 8	Denver Wheel Club*	Boulder, CO	W 29–0
November 12	at Colorado College	Colorado Springs, CO	L 0–12
November 17	Nebraska*	Boulder, CO	L 10–23
November 24	at Denver Athletic Club*	Denver, CO	W 23–5
*Non-conference game
