= 1884 Denver Ministers football team =

American college football season

1884 Denver Ministers football
- Conference: Independent
- Record: 0–1

1884 college football records
| | Conf. | | | Overall |
| Team | W | L | T | W | | L | | T |
|---|---|---|---|---|---|---|---|---|
| Princeton | | – | | 9 | – | 0 | – | 1 |
| Yale | | – | | 8 | – | 0 | – | 1 |
| Michigan | | – | | 2 | – | 0 | – | 0 |
| Williams | | – | | 2 | – | 0 | – | 0 |
| Navy | | – | | 1 | – | 0 | – | 0 |
| Wabash | | – | | 1 | – | 0 | – | 0 |
| Penn | | – | | 5 | – | 1 | – | 1 |
| Fordham | | – | | 5 | – | 1 | – | 0 |
| Harvard | | – | | 7 | – | 4 | – | 0 |
| Wesleyan | | – | | 3 | – | 2 | – | 0 |
| Butler | | – | | 1 | – | 1 | – | 0 |
| Columbia | | – | | 1 | – | 1 | – | 0 |
| Rutgers | | – | | 3 | – | 4 | – | 0 |
| Stevens | | – | | 4 | – | 5 | – | 0 |
| Dartmouth | | – | | 1 | – | 2 | – | 1 |
| Tufts | | – | | 2 | – | 4 | – | 1 |
| Massachusetts | | – | | 1 | – | 2 | – | 0 |
| Lafayette | | – | | 2 | – | 5 | – | 0 |
| Johns Hopkins | | – | | 1 | – | 3 | – | 0 |
| Albion | | – | | 0 | – | 1 | – | 0 |
| CCNY | | – | | 0 | – | 1 | – | 0 |
| Denver | | – | | 0 | – | 1 | – | 0 |
| DePauw | | – | | 0 | – | 1 | – | 0 |
| Olivet | | – | | 0 | – | 2 | – | 0 |
| Amherst | | – | | 0 | – | 3 | – | 0 |
| Lehigh | | – | | 0 | – | 4 | – | 0 |

The 1884 Denver Ministers football team represented the University of Denver during the 1884 college football season. The team compiled a record of 0–1.

== Schedule ==
| Date | Opponent | Site | Result | Source |
|---|---|---|---|---|
| April 11, 1885 | at Colorado College | Colorado Springs Athletic Park; Colorado Springs, CO | L 0–12 | |
