= 1891 Colorado Silver and Gold football team =

American college football season

1891 Colorado Silver and Gold football
- Conference: Independent
- Record: 1–4
- Head coach: None
- Captain: Pat Carney
- Home stadium: Campus Fields

1891 Far West college football independents records
	Conf.			Overall
Team	W	L	T	W		L		T
Stanford		–		3	–	1	–	0
California (spring)		–		4	–	2	–	0
Washington		–		1	–	1	–	0
USC		–		1	–	2	–	0
Colorado		–		1	–	4	–	0
California		–		0	–	1	–	0

The 1891 Colorado Silver and Gold football team was an American football team that represented the University of Colorado as an independent during the 1891 college football season. The team has no head coach and compiled a record of 1–4 which included the program's first win.

== Schedule ==
Date	Opponent	Site	Result
October 24	Colorado Mines	Boulder, CO	L 6–10
October 31	at Denver Athletic Club	Denver, CO	L 0–42
November 3	Denver Athletic Club	Boulder, CO	L 0–44
November 7	at Colorado Mines	Golden, CO	L 0–6
November 26	at Colorado Springs A.A.	Colorado Springs, CO	W 24–4
