= 1884 Harvard Crimson football team =

American college football season

1884 Harvard Crimson football
- Conference: Independent
- Record: 7–4
- Head coach: None
- Home stadium: Jarvis Field

1884 college football records
	Conf.			Overall
Team	W	L	T	W		L		T
Princeton		–		9	–	0	–	1
Yale		–		8	–	0	–	1
Michigan		–		2	–	0	–	0
Williams		–		2	–	0	–	0
Navy		–		1	–	0	–	0
Wabash		–		1	–	0	–	0
Penn		–		5	–	1	–	1
Fordham		–		5	–	1	–	0
Harvard		–		7	–	4	–	0
Wesleyan		–		3	–	2	–	0
Butler		–		1	–	1	–	0
Columbia		–		1	–	1	–	0
Rutgers		–		3	–	4	–	0
Stevens		–		4	–	5	–	0
Dartmouth		–		1	–	2	–	1
Tufts		–		2	–	4	–	1
Massachusetts		–		1	–	2	–	0
Lafayette		–		2	–	5	–	0
Johns Hopkins		–		1	–	3	–	0
Albion		–		0	–	1	–	0
CCNY		–		0	–	1	–	0
Denver		–		0	–	1	–	0
DePauw		–		0	–	1	–	0
Olivet		–		0	–	2	–	0
Amherst		–		0	–	3	–	0
Lehigh		–		0	–	4	–	0

The 1884 Harvard Crimson football team represented Harvard University in the 1884 college football season. They finished with a 7–4 record.

On November 15, Harvard lost to Princeton by a 36–6 score before 3,000 spectators at Jarvis Field in Cambridge.

On November 22, Harvard lost to Yale by a 51–0 score before 2,400 spectators at the new athletic grounds in New Haven. The game was played in two halves of 45 minutes with a 15-minute intermission.

== Schedule ==
Date	Opponent	Site	Result	Attendance	Source
October 11	Boston Tech	Jarvis Field; Cambridge, MA	W 47–5		
October 22	Penn	Jarvis Field; Cambridge, MA (rivalry)	L 0–4	300–400	
October 25	at Boston Tech	Union Grounds; Boston, MA	W 42–0	200	
October 31	Trinity (CT)	Jarvis Field; Cambridge, MA	W 67–0		
November 1	at Wesleyan	Hartford Ball Club Grounds; Hartford, CT	L 0–16	500	
November 6	Williams	Jarvis Field; Cambridge, MA	W 23–0	400	
November 8	at Ottawa	Rideau Hall grounds; Ottawa, ON	W 20–6		
November 10	at Dartmouth	Hanover, NH (rivalry)	W 29–0		
November 12	Tufts	Jarvis Field; Cambridge, MA	W 51–0	200–300	
November 15	Princeton	Jarvis Field; Cambridge, MA (rivalry)	L 6–36	2,000–3,000	
November 22	at Yale	Yale Field; New Haven, CT (rivalry)	L 0–52	2,400–2,500	
