= 1884 Penn Quakers football team =

American college football season

1884 Penn Quakers football
- Conference: Independent
- Record: 5–1–1
- Head coach: None
- Captain: Alexander Gray
- Home stadium: Recreation Park

1884 college football records
	Conf.			Overall
Team	W	L	T	W		L		T
Princeton		–		9	–	0	–	1
Yale		–		8	–	0	–	1
Michigan		–		2	–	0	–	0
Williams		–		2	–	0	–	0
Navy		–		1	–	0	–	0
Wabash		–		1	–	0	–	0
Penn		–		5	–	1	–	1
Fordham		–		5	–	1	–	0
Harvard		–		7	–	4	–	0
Wesleyan		–		3	–	2	–	0
Butler		–		1	–	1	–	0
Columbia		–		1	–	1	–	0
Rutgers		–		3	–	4	–	0
Stevens		–		4	–	5	–	0
Dartmouth		–		1	–	2	–	1
Tufts		–		2	–	4	–	1
Massachusetts		–		1	–	2	–	0
Lafayette		–		2	–	5	–	0
Johns Hopkins		–		1	–	3	–	0
Albion		–		0	–	1	–	0
CCNY		–		0	–	1	–	0
Denver		–		0	–	1	–	0
DePauw		–		0	–	1	–	0
Olivet		–		0	–	2	–	0
Amherst		–		0	–	3	–	0
Lehigh		–		0	–	4	–	0

The 1884 Penn Quakers football team was an American football team that represented the University of Pennsylvania during the 1884 college football season. The team compiled a 5–1–1 record. Alexander Gray was the team captain, and there was no coach.

== Schedule ==
Date	Time	Opponent	Site	Result	Attendance	Source
October 22		at Harvard	Jarvis Field; Cambridge, MA (rivalry)	W 4–0	300–400	
October 25	3:30 p.m.	Princeton	Recreation Park; Philadelphia, PA (rivalry)	L 0–31	600	
November 1		at Lafayette	Easton, PA	W 21–0		
November 8		Stevens	Recreation Park; Philadelphia, PA	W 30–0		
November 15		at Johns Hopkins	Baltimore, MD	W 33–0		
November 20		Graduates		T 16–16		
November 27		vs. Wesleyan	Metropolitan Park; New York, NY	W 14–12		
