= 1897 Colorado Silver and Gold football team =

American college football season

1897 Colorado Silver and Gold football

CFA champion
- Conference: Colorado Football Association
- Record: 7–1 (2–0 CFA)
- Head coach: Fred Folsom (3rd season)
- Captain: Ed Dillon
- Home stadium: Campus fields

1897 Colorado Football Association standings
	Conf.					Overall
Team	W		L		T	W		L		T
Colorado $	2	–	0	–	0	7	–	1	–	0
Colorado Mines	1	–	1	–	0	2	–	2	–	0
Colorado College	0	–	2	–	0	3	–	5	–	0
$ – Conference champion

The 1897 Colorado Silver and Gold football team was an American football team that represented the University of Colorado as a member of the Colorado Football Association (CFA) during the 1897 college football season. Led by third-year head coach Fred Folsom, Colorado compiled an overall record of 7–1 with a mark of 2–0 in conference play, winning the CFA title for the fourth consecutive year.

== Schedule ==
Date	Opponent	Site	Result
October 2	East High School*	Boulder, CO	W 22–0
October 9	West High School*	Boulder, CO	W 52–0
October 16	Manual High School*	Boulder, CO	W 18–0
October 23	Littleton Athletic Club*	Boulder, CO	W 30–0
November 2	at Colorado College	Colorado Springs, CO	W 8–0
November 6	at Denver Wheel Club*	Denver, CO	W 22–0
November 13	Colorado Mines	Boulder, CO	W 36–2
November 25	at Denver Athletic Club*	Denver, CO	L 0–8
*Non-conference game
