= 1896 Colorado Silver and Gold football team =

American college football season

1896 Colorado Silver and Gold football

CFA champion
- Conference: Colorado Football Association
- Record: 5–0 (2–0 CFA)
- Head coach: Fred Folsom (2nd season)
- Captain: Harry Gamble
- Home stadium: Campus Fields

1896 Colorado Football Association standings
	Conf.					Overall
Team	W		L		T	W		L		T
Colorado $	2	–	0	–	0	5	–	0	–	0
Colorado Mines	1	–	1	–	0	1	–	2	–	0
Colorado College	0	–	2	–	0	3	–	4	–	0
$ – Conference champion

The 1896 Colorado Silver and Gold football team was an American football team that represented the University of Colorado as a member of the Colorado Football Association (CFA) during the 1896 college football season. Led by second-year head coach Fred Folsom, Colorado compiled an overall record of 5–0 with a mark of 2–0 in conference play, winning the CFA title for the third consecutive year. This was the program's first undefeated season.

== Schedule ==
Date	Opponent	Site	Result
October 3	Manual High School*	Boulder, CO	W 42–0
October 10	East High School*	Boulder, CO	W 41–0
November 4	at Colorado Mines	Golden, CO	W 30–0
November 15	Colorado College	Boulder, CO	W 50–0
November 26	at Denver Athletic Club*	Denver, CO	W 8–6
*Non-conference game
