= 1884 Lafayette football team =

American college football season

1884 Lafayette football
- Conference: Independent
- Record: 2–5
- Head coach: None
- Captain: Lewis Frey

1884 college football records
	Conf.			Overall
Team	W	L	T	W		L		T
Princeton		–		9	–	0	–	1
Yale		–		8	–	0	–	1
Michigan		–		2	–	0	–	0
Williams		–		2	–	0	–	0
Navy		–		1	–	0	–	0
Wabash		–		1	–	0	–	0
Penn		–		5	–	1	–	1
Fordham		–		5	–	1	–	0
Harvard		–		7	–	4	–	0
Wesleyan		–		3	–	2	–	0
Butler		–		1	–	1	–	0
Columbia		–		1	–	1	–	0
Rutgers		–		3	–	4	–	0
Stevens		–		4	–	5	–	0
Dartmouth		–		1	–	2	–	1
Tufts		–		2	–	4	–	1
Massachusetts		–		1	–	2	–	0
Lafayette		–		2	–	5	–	0
Johns Hopkins		–		1	–	3	–	0
Albion		–		0	–	1	–	0
CCNY		–		0	–	1	–	0
Denver		–		0	–	1	–	0
DePauw		–		0	–	1	–	0
Olivet		–		0	–	2	–	0
Amherst		–		0	–	3	–	0
Lehigh		–		0	–	4	–	0

The 1884 Lafayette football team was an American football team that represented Lafayette College as an independent during the 1884 college football season. Playing without a regular coach, the team compiled a 2–5 record and was outscored by a total of 261 to 88. Lewis Frey was the team captain, and F. Drake was the manager. The team played its home games on The Quad in Easton, Pennsylvania.

On October 29, 1884, Lafayette lost to Princeton by a 140–0 score. Princeton's 140 points was the highest score achieved by a team in the history of the sport to that time.

== Schedule ==
Date	Time	Opponent	Site	Result	Attendance	Source
October 25		Lehigh	Easton, PA (rivalry)	W 56–0		
October 29	12:30 p.m.	at Princeton	Princeton, NJ	L 0–140		
November 1		Penn	Easton, PA	L 0–21		
November 8		at Rutgers	New Brunswick, NJ	L 0–26		
November 12		at Lehigh	Bethlehem, PA	W 34–4		
November 15		Stevens	Easton, PA	L 4–17		
November 27		at Stevens	St George's Cricket Club; Hoboken, NJ	L 0–52	2,000	
