= Olivet football, 1884–1899 =

American college football seasons

The Olivet football teams (later known as the Olvet Comets) represented Olivet College in American football during the program's first two decades from 1884 to 1899. Highlights include the following:

- In 1884, Olivet began its intercollegiate football program, losing two games to Albion College.
- In 1891, Olivet won its first football games, defeating Albion by a 30–21 and Michigan Agricultural by scores of 78–0 and 70–0.
- In 1894, Olivet compiled a perfect season with a 4–0 record and a Michigan Intercollegiate Athletic Association (MIAA) championship.

== 1884 ==
1884 Olivet football
- Conference: Independent
- Record: 0–2
- Head coach: None

1884 college football records
	Conf.			Overall
Team	W	L	T	W		L		T
Princeton		–		9	–	0	–	1
Yale		–		8	–	0	–	1
Michigan		–		2	–	0	–	0
Williams		–		2	–	0	–	0
Navy		–		1	–	0	–	0
Wabash		–		1	–	0	–	0
Penn		–		5	–	1	–	1
Fordham		–		5	–	1	–	0
Harvard		–		7	–	4	–	0
Wesleyan		–		3	–	2	–	0
Butler		–		1	–	1	–	0
Columbia		–		1	–	1	–	0
Rutgers		–		3	–	4	–	0
Stevens		–		4	–	5	–	0
Dartmouth		–		1	–	2	–	1
Tufts		–		2	–	4	–	1
Massachusetts		–		1	–	2	–	0
Lafayette		–		2	–	5	–	0
Johns Hopkins		–		1	–	3	–	0
Albion		–		0	–	1	–	0
CCNY		–		0	–	1	–	0
Denver		–		0	–	1	–	0
DePauw		–		0	–	1	–	0
Olivet		–		0	–	2	–	0
Amherst		–		0	–	3	–	0
Lehigh		–		0	–	4	–	0

The 1884 Olivet football team represented Olivet College during the 1884 college football season. In Olivet's first year fielding a varsity football team, the Comets compiled a 0–2 record, both games against Albion, and were outscored by a total of 20 to 7.

=== Schedule ===
Date	Opponent	Site	Result
	Albion		L 2–10
May 10	Albion		L 5–10

== 1890 ==
1890 Olivet football
- Conference: Michigan Intercollegiate Athletic Association
- Record: 0–1 (0–1 MIAA)

The 1890 Olivet football team represented Olivet College during the 1890 college football season. In Olivet's second year fielding a varsity football team, the team compiled a 0–1 record, losing to Albion by a 32–12 score.

=== Schedule ===
Date	Opponent	Site	Result	Source
November 15	Albion	Olivet, MI	L 12–32	

== 1891 ==
1891 Olivet football
- Conference: Michigan Intercollegiate Athletic Association
- Record: 3–2 (1–1 MIAA)

The 1891 Olivet football team represented Olivet College during the 1891 college football season. The team compiled a 3–2 record.

=== Schedule ===
Date	Opponent	Site	Result	Attendance	Source
	Albion		W 30–21		
	Michigan Agricultural		W 78–0		
	Michigan Agricultural		W 70–0		
October 19	Michigan	Ann Arbor Fairgrounds; Ann Arbor, MI	L 6–18		
October 31	vs. Albion	Trotting Association grounds; Battle Creek, MI	L 6–24	3,000–5,000	

== 1892 ==
1892 Olivet football
- Conference: Michigan Intercollegiate Athletic Association
- Record: 2–1 (0–1 MIAA)

The 1892 Olivet football team team that represented Olivet College during the 1892 college football season. The team compiled an overall record of 2–1.

=== Schedule ===
Date	Opponent	Site	Result	Source
October 24	Kalamazoo*	Olivet, MI	W 20–4	
November 3	at Kalamazoo*	Fair grounds; Kalamazoo, MI	W 12–4	
November 7	Hillsdale	Charlotte, MI	L 12–14	
*Non-conference game

== 1893 ==
1893 Olivet football
- Conference: Michigan Intercollegiate Athletic Association
- Record: 1–1 (0–1 MIAA)

The 1893 Olivet football team represented Olivet College as a member of the Michigan Intercollegiate Athletic Association (MIAA) during the 1893 college football season. The team compiled an overall record of 1–1.

=== Schedule ===
Date	Opponent	Site	Result	Source
October 2	at Kalamazoo*	Kalamazoo, MI	W 26–6	
November 4	Albion	Olivet, MI	L 16–42	
*Non-conference game

== 1894 ==
1894 Olivet football
- Conference: Michigan Intercollegiate Athletic Association
- Record: 1–3 (1–2 MIAA)

1894 Michigan Intercollegiate Athletic Association football standings
	Conf.					Overall
Team	W		L		T	W		L		T
Albion $	3	–	0	–	0	5	–	1	–	1
Hillsdale	1	–	2	–	0	3	–	3	–	0
Olivet	1	–	2	–	0	1	–	3	–	0
Michigan State Normal	0	–	1	–	0	5	–	2	–	0
$ – Conference champion

The 1894 Olivet football team represented Olivet College as a member of the Michigan Intercollegiate Athletic Association (MIAA) during the 1894 college football season. The team compiled a 1–3 record (1–2 in conference games).

=== Schedule ===
Date	Opponent	Site	Result	Source
October 6	Michigan State Normal	Olivet, MI	W 48–0	
October 17	at Michigan*	Regents Field; Ann Arbor, MI	L 0–48	
October 22	at Hillsdale	Hillsdale, MI	L 6–34	
November 5	at Albion	Albion, MI	L 0–18	
November 10	at Kalamazoo*	Lake View Park; Kalamazoo, MI	Cancelled	
*Non-conference game

== 1895 ==
1895 Olivet football

MIAA champion
- Conference: Michigan Intercollegiate Athletic Association
- Record: 4–0 (1–0 MIAA)

The 1895 Olivet football team represented Olivet College as a member of the Michigan Intercollegiate Athletic Association (MIAA) during the 1895 college football season. The team compiled a 4–0 record (1–0 in conference games), outscored opponents by a total of 117 to 2, and won the MIAA championship.

=== Schedule ===
Date	Opponent	Site	Result	Source
October 3	Kalamazoo*	Olivet, MI	W 38–0	
October 28	Lansing*		W 26–0	
November 4	Adrian*		W 32–0	
November 16	Albion	Olivet, MI	W 22–2	
*Non-conference game

== 1896 ==
1896 Olivet football
- Conference: Michigan Intercollegiate Athletic Association
- Record: 1–1 (0–0 MIAA)

The 1896 Olivet football team represented Olivet College as a member of the Michigan Intercollegiate Athletic Association (MIAA) during the 1896 college football season. The team compiled an overall record of 1–1.

=== Schedule ===
Date	Opponent	Site	Result	Attendance	Source
	Lansing Athletic Club*		W 22–6		
October 24	at Detroit Athletic Club*	Detroit, MI	L 4–24	600	
*Non-conference game

== 1897 ==
1897 Olivet football
- Conference: Michigan Intercollegiate Athletic Association
- Record: 1–5–1 (1–4 MIAA)

The 1897 Olivet football team represented Olivet College as a member of the Michigan Intercollegiate Athletic Association (MIAA) during the 1897 college football season. The team compiled a 1–5–1 record (1–4 in conference games).

=== Schedule ===
Date	Opponent	Site	Result	Attendance	Source
October 2	at Michigan Agricultural*	Lansing, MI	L 6–26		
October 9	Albion	Olivet, MI	W 28–16		
October 16	Michigan Agricultural*	Olivet, MI	T 18–18		
October 25	at Kalamazoo	Recreation Park; Kalamazoo, MI	L 0–60	450	
	Albion		L 0–36		
November 6	Kalamazoo	Olivet, MI	L 0–32		
November 29	at Alma	Alma, MI	L 0–16		
*Non-conference game

== 1898 ==
1898 Olivet football
- Conference: Michigan Intercollegiate Athletic Association
- Record: 0–5 (0–3 MIAA)

1898 Michigan Intercollegiate Athletic Association football standings
	Conf.					Overall
Team	W		L		T	W		L		T
Kalamazoo $	5	–	0	–	0	7	–	0	–	0
Hillsdale	2	–	0	–	0	4	–	1	–	0
Michigan Agricultural	4	–	1	–	0	4	–	3	–	0
Michigan State Normal	0	–	3	–	0	1	–	5	–	2
Olivet	0	–	3	–	0	0	–	5	–	0
Albion	0	–	4	–	0	1	–	6	–	0
$ – Conference champion

The 1898 Olivet football team represented Olivet College as a member of the Michigan Intercollegiate Athletic Association (MIAA) during the 1898 college football season. The team compiled an overall record of 0–5 with a mark of 0–3 in conference play.

=== Schedule ===
Date	Time	Opponent	Site	Result	Source
October 15		at Detroit Athletic Club*	Detroit, MI	L 0–25	
October 22	3:30 p.m.	Olivet alumni*	Olivet, MI	L 6–12	
October 24		at Kalamazoo	Kalamazoo, MI	L 0–17	
October 29		Michigan Agricultural	Olivet, MI	L 0–45	
November 19		Kalamazoo	Olivet, MI	L 5–24	
*Non-conference game

== 1899 ==
1899 Olivet football
- Conference: Michigan Intercollegiate Athletic Association
- Record: 4–2 (4–2 MIAA)
- Head coach: Carl E. Mapes (1st season)

The 1899 Olivet football team represented Olivet College as a member of the Michigan Intercollegiate Athletic Association (MIAA) during the 1899 college football season. In its first year under head coach Carl E. Mapes, the team compiled an overall record of 4–2 with all games played against conference opponents.

=== Schedule ===
Date	Opponent	Site	Result	Source
October 14	Albion	Olivet, MI	W 23–11	
October 28	Kalamazoo	Olivet, MI	L 11–12	
	Hillsdale		W 6–0	
November 11	at Albion	Albion, MI	L 0–10	
November 18	Hillsdale	Olivet, MI	W 6–0	
November 25	Michigan Agricultural	Olivet, MI	W 18–17	
