= 1884 Navy Midshipmen football team =

American college football season

1884 Navy Midshipmen football
- Conference: Independent
- Record: 1–0
- Head coach: None
- Captain: Jim Kittrell
- Home stadium: Western King Field

1884 college football records
	Conf.			Overall
Team	W	L	T	W		L		T
Princeton		–		9	–	0	–	1
Yale		–		8	–	0	–	1
Michigan		–		2	–	0	–	0
Williams		–		2	–	0	–	0
Navy		–		1	–	0	–	0
Wabash		–		1	–	0	–	0
Penn		–		5	–	1	–	1
Fordham		–		5	–	1	–	0
Harvard		–		7	–	4	–	0
Wesleyan		–		3	–	2	–	0
Butler		–		1	–	1	–	0
Columbia		–		1	–	1	–	0
Rutgers		–		3	–	4	–	0
Stevens		–		4	–	5	–	0
Dartmouth		–		1	–	2	–	1
Tufts		–		2	–	4	–	1
Massachusetts		–		1	–	2	–	0
Lafayette		–		2	–	5	–	0
Johns Hopkins		–		1	–	3	–	0
Albion		–		0	–	1	–	0
CCNY		–		0	–	1	–	0
Denver		–		0	–	1	–	0
DePauw		–		0	–	1	–	0
Olivet		–		0	–	2	–	0
Amherst		–		0	–	3	–	0
Lehigh		–		0	–	4	–	0

The 1884 Navy Midshipmen football team represented the United States Naval Academy in the 1884 college football season. The team was the fourth intercollegiate football squad to represent the United States Naval Academy, and was the final time the school played a single-game season. The squad was captained by rusher Jim Kittrell. The team's single game was a 9 to 6 (9–6) defeat of rival-school Johns Hopkins. The season continued a seven-season, eight game rivalry between the Naval Academy and Johns Hopkins. It was the final season that a Naval Academy team would go unbeaten and untied.

== Schedule ==
Date	Opponent	Site	Result	Attendance
November 27	Johns Hopkins	Unknown; Annapolis, MD (rivalry)	W 9–6	1000

== Background and prelude ==
According to biographer C. Douglas Kroll, the first evidence of a form of football at the United States Naval Academy came in 1857, but the school's cadets lost interest in the game shortly afterward. However, it is widely believed by football researchers that the playing of intercollegiate football began in November 1869, when a player at Rutgers University challenged another player at the nearby College of New Jersey (now Princeton). The contest more closely resembled soccer, with teams scoring by kicking the ball into the opponent's net, and lacked a uniform rules structure. The game developed slowly; the first rules were drafted in October 1873, and only consisted of twelve guidelines. Even though the number of teams participating in the sport increased, the game was still effectively controlled by the College of New Jersey, who claimed eight national championships in ten years. Only Yale presented any form of challenge, claiming four national championships in the same time period. (Note: Multiple teams were selected as national champion in several different seasons. Between 1869 and 1880, there were only four years when one team was selected as national champion by all selectors.)

The Naval Academy's first ever football team was fielded in 1879. The squad was entirely student-operated, receiving no official support from Naval Academy officials. The team was entirely funded by its members and their fellow students. The 1879 team participated in just one game, which resulted in a scoreless tie. It was played against the Baltimore Athletic Club, apparently on the Academy superintendent's cow pasture. Navy would not field a football team in 1880 or 1881, due to the lack of support from officials. When football returned to the academy in 1882, the squad was led by player-coach Vaulx Carter, and won 8–0 in a match with Johns Hopkins, starting the seven-year rivalry between the schools. The 1883 season resulted in Navy's first ever loss, a 2–0 defeat by Johns Hopkins.

== Season summary ==
=== Navy 9, Johns Hopkins 6 ===
The sole game of Navy's 1884 season was the annual competition against rival Johns Hopkins, the third consecutive playing of the series. In what was the final season where the rivalry was the only game of the year, Navy defeated Johns Hopkins 9–6. The game, played on November 27, was hosted by the Academy, likely on an unused drill or parade field. In an unusual agreement between the two schools, the contest was played entirely under rugby rules. In the first half, Hopkins scored twice, on a touchdown from Mr. Bonsall and on a two-point safety. Navy scored twice in the second half of the game, when halfback Julius Dashiell, brother of Hopkins' Paul Dashiell, kicked a five-point goal and rusher David W. Taylor scored a touchdown to secure a victory.

The game was somewhat marred by one of the players suffering a broken collarbone and another spraining an ankle.

== Players ==
The 1884 Naval Academy team was made up of eleven players at four different positions. The squad consisted of seven rushers, one fullback, two halfbacks, and a quarterback:

Rushers

- Cornelius Billings
- Buell Franklin
- Jim Kittrell (capt.)
- Bill Miller
- Fred Moore
- Clarence Stone
- Dave Taylor

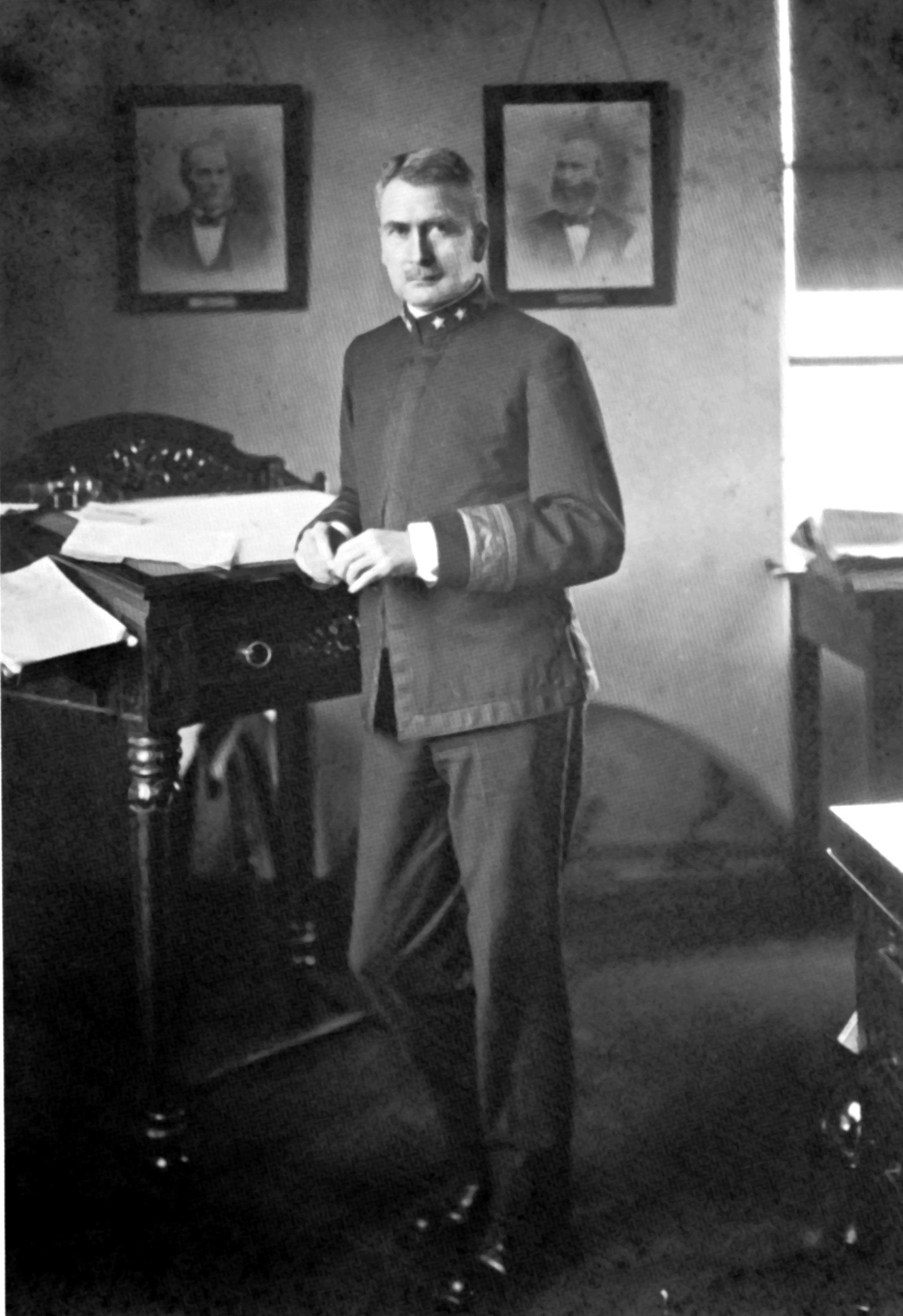
Dave Taylor, who would later become a rear admiral, was a rusher on the 1884 team

Fullbacks

- Joe Ricketts

Halfbacks

- Julius Dashiell
- Pat McGuinness

Quarterback

- George Slocum

== Postseason and aftermath ==
The first postseason college football game was not played until 1902, with the Pasadena Tournament of Roses' establishment of the east–west tournament game, later known as the Rose Bowl. The Midshipmen did not participate in their first Rose Bowl until the 1923 season, when they went 5–1–2 and tied with the Washington Huskies 14–14 in the match. As a result of the lack of a competition, there were no postseason games played after the 1882 season. According to statistics compiled by the National Championship Foundation, Parke Davis, and the Helms Athletic Foundation, Yale was declared the 1884 season champion. However, the Billingsley college football research center and Parke Davis also selected Princeton as the 1884 national champions.

The 1884 win over Johns Hopkins brought the Naval Academy's overall win–loss record to positive, as well as once again giving the Midshipmen a lead over Hopkins in their rivalry. The season marked the final time a team for the Naval Academy would play a single-game season. In 1885, their schedule was expanded to three games. It also marked the final time a Navy team finished a season unbeaten and untied; the closest a squad would come was in 1926, when they went 9–0–1. Navy finished the 1880s with four winning seasons, and an overall record of 14–12–2. The school outscored their opponents 292–231, and finished the 19th century with an overall record of 54–19–3.
