= William J. Duff =

American football player, medical doctor, and state legislator (1856–1922)

- Dr. William J. Duff, 1912
- Born: August 17, 1856; Allegheny City, Pennsylvania, United States
- Died: May 26, 1922 (aged 65)
- Education: University of Michigan
- Known for: Football player/Medical doctor

William J. Duff (August 17, 1856 – May 26, 1922) was an American football player, medical doctor, and state legislator. He played college football for the University of Michigan in 1882 to 1884.

Duff was born in Allegheny City, Pennsylvania, in 1856. In 1868, the family moved to Fort Gratiot, now a part of Port Huron, Michigan. His father, George Duff, was an officer in the U.S. infantry stationed at Fort Gratiot. Duff attended the public schools of Port Huron and was sent to Ann Arbor High School for his preparatory education.

He enrolled at the University of Michigan where he studied medicine. While attending Michigan, he played college football for the 1882 and 1884 Michigan Wolverines football teams.

In 1885, Duff returned to Port Huron and entered the practice of medicine. During the Spanish–American War, he went to Cuba with the 33rd Michigan Volunteers. After the war, he served in the Michigan legislature in the sessions of 1899 and 1900. In June 1899, he married Wilhelmina Ross. They had one son, William Robert Mercer, born in 1901.

Duff died in May 1922 from angina pectoris.

== See also ==
- 1882 Michigan Wolverines football team
- 1884 Michigan Wolverines football team
