= 1884 Princeton Tigers football team =

American college football season

1884 Princeton Tigers football
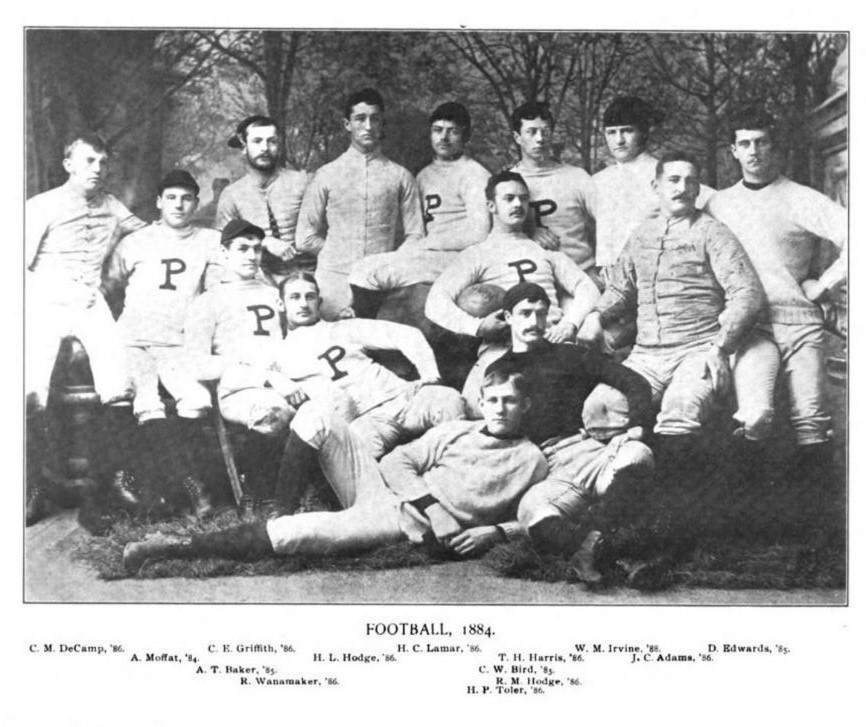

National champion (Billingsley) Co-national champion (Davis)
- Conference: Independent
- Record: 9–0–1
- Head coach: None
- Captain: Clinton N. Bird

1884 college football records
	Conf.			Overall
Team	W	L	T	W		L		T
Princeton		–		9	–	0	–	1
Yale		–		8	–	0	–	1
Michigan		–		2	–	0	–	0
Williams		–		2	–	0	–	0
Navy		–		1	–	0	–	0
Wabash		–		1	–	0	–	0
Penn		–		5	–	1	–	1
Fordham		–		5	–	1	–	0
Harvard		–		7	–	4	–	0
Wesleyan		–		3	–	2	–	0
Butler		–		1	–	1	–	0
Columbia		–		1	–	1	–	0
Rutgers		–		3	–	4	–	0
Stevens		–		4	–	5	–	0
Dartmouth		–		1	–	2	–	1
Tufts		–		2	–	4	–	1
Massachusetts		–		1	–	2	–	0
Lafayette		–		2	–	5	–	0
Johns Hopkins		–		1	–	3	–	0
Albion		–		0	–	1	–	0
CCNY		–		0	–	1	–	0
Denver		–		0	–	1	–	0
DePauw		–		0	–	1	–	0
Olivet		–		0	–	2	–	0
Amherst		–		0	–	3	–	0
Lehigh		–		0	–	4	–	0

The 1884 Princeton Tigers football team represented the College of New Jersey, then more commonly known as Princeton College, in the 1884 college football season. The Tigers finished with a 9–0–1 record and were retroactively named national champions by the Billingsley Report and co-champions by Parke H. Davis. This season marked Princeton's 12th football national championship. Clinton N. Bird was the team captain.

== Schedule ==
Date	Time	Opponent	Site	Result	Attendance	Source
October 4		at Rutgers	New Brunswick, NJ (rivalry)	W 23–5		
October 11	3:00 p.m.	Wesleyan	Princeton, NJ	W 22–2		
October 15		at Stevens	St. George's Cricket Club grounds; Hoboken, NJ	W 4–0		
October 18	2:40 p.m.	Rutgers	Princeton, NJ	W 35–0		
October 25	3:30 p.m.	at Penn	Recreation Park; Philadelphia, PA	W 31–0	600	
October 29	12:30 p.m.	Lafayette	Princeton, NJ	W 140–0		
November 1		Stevens	Princeton, NJ	W 58–0		
November 8		Johns Hopkins	Princeton, NJ	W 57–0		
November 15		at Harvard	Jarvis Field; Cambridge, MA (rivalry)	W 36–6	2,000–3,000	
November 27		vs. Yale	Polo Grounds; New York, NY (rivalry)	T 0–0	over 10,000	

== Roster ==
- Adams
- Alfred Thornton Baker
- Clinton N. Bird
- C. M. DeCamp
- Fine
- Green
- Griffith
- Harris
- H. Hodge
- Richard Hodge
- William Mann Irvine
- Tillie Lamar
- Alex Moffat
- Toler
- Rodman Wanamaker
- Withington
