= 1884 Michigan Wolverines football team =

American college football season

1884 Michigan Wolverines football
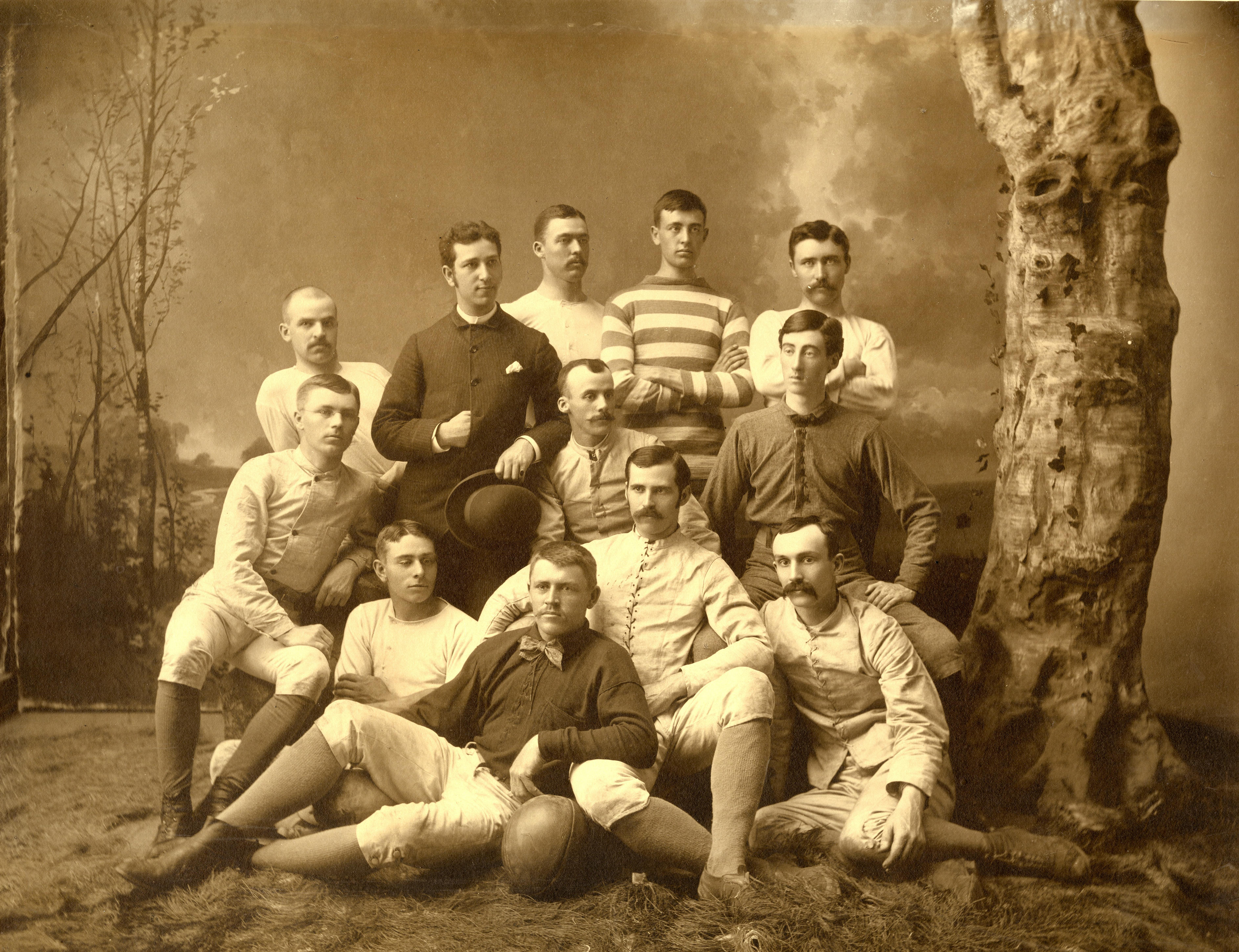
- Conference: Independent
- Record: 2–0
- Head coach: None
- Captain: Horace Greely Prettyman
- Home stadium: Ann Arbor Fairgrounds

1884 college football records
	Conf.			Overall
Team	W	L	T	W		L		T
Princeton		–		9	–	0	–	1
Yale		–		8	–	0	–	1
Michigan		–		2	–	0	–	0
Williams		–		2	–	0	–	0
Navy		–		1	–	0	–	0
Wabash		–		1	–	0	–	0
Penn		–		5	–	1	–	1
Fordham		–		5	–	1	–	0
Harvard		–		7	–	4	–	0
Wesleyan		–		3	–	2	–	0
Butler		–		1	–	1	–	0
Columbia		–		1	–	1	–	0
Rutgers		–		3	–	4	–	0
Stevens		–		4	–	5	–	0
Dartmouth		–		1	–	2	–	1
Tufts		–		2	–	4	–	1
Massachusetts		–		1	–	2	–	0
Lafayette		–		2	–	5	–	0
Johns Hopkins		–		1	–	3	–	0
Albion		–		0	–	1	–	0
CCNY		–		0	–	1	–	0
Denver		–		0	–	1	–	0
DePauw		–		0	–	1	–	0
Olivet		–		0	–	2	–	0
Amherst		–		0	–	3	–	0
Lehigh		–		0	–	4	–	0

The 1884 Michigan Wolverines football team represented the University of Michigan in the 1884 college football season. The team compiled a 2–0 record and outscored its opponents by a combined score of 36 to 10. The team captain was Horace Greely Prettyman. Prettyman played a record eight years on the Michigan Wolverines football team between 1882 and 1890. The team's manager and starting center was Henry Killilea. Killilea was one of the five men who founded baseball's American League as a major league in 1899. He also owned the Boston Red Sox from 1903 until 1904. Quarterback Thomas H. McNeil went on to become the 30th Grand Chancellor of the Knights of Pythias.

== Schedule ==
Date	Time	Opponent	Site	Result	Attendance
November 15	4:15 p.m.	Albion	Ann Arbor Fairgrounds; Ann Arbor, MI	W 18–0	
November 22	2:15 p.m.	Chicago University Club	Ann Arbor Fairgrounds; Ann Arbor, MI	W 18–10	200

== Season summary ==
=== Pre-season ===
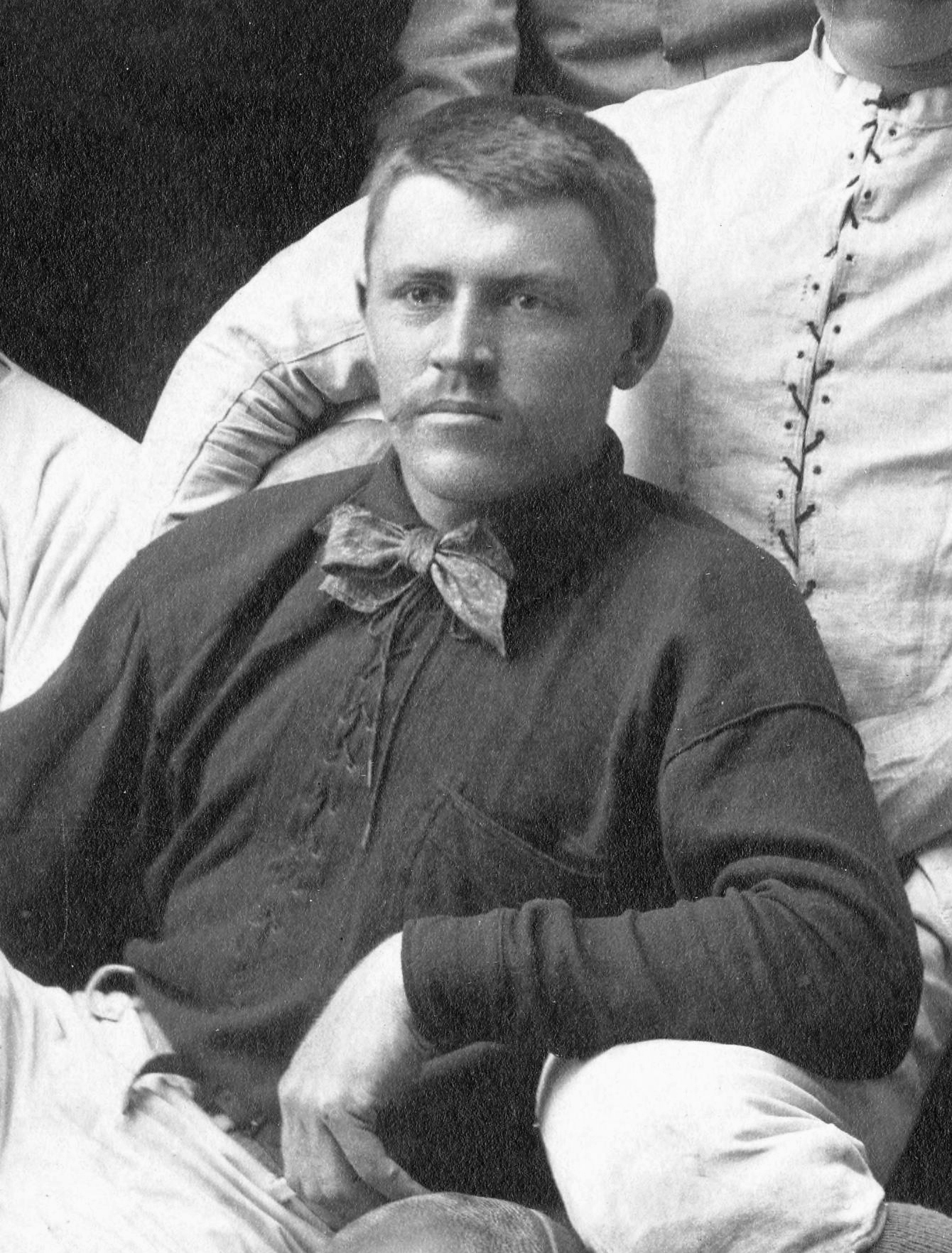
Quarterback Thomas H. McNeil became the 30th Grand Chancellor of the Knights of Pythias.

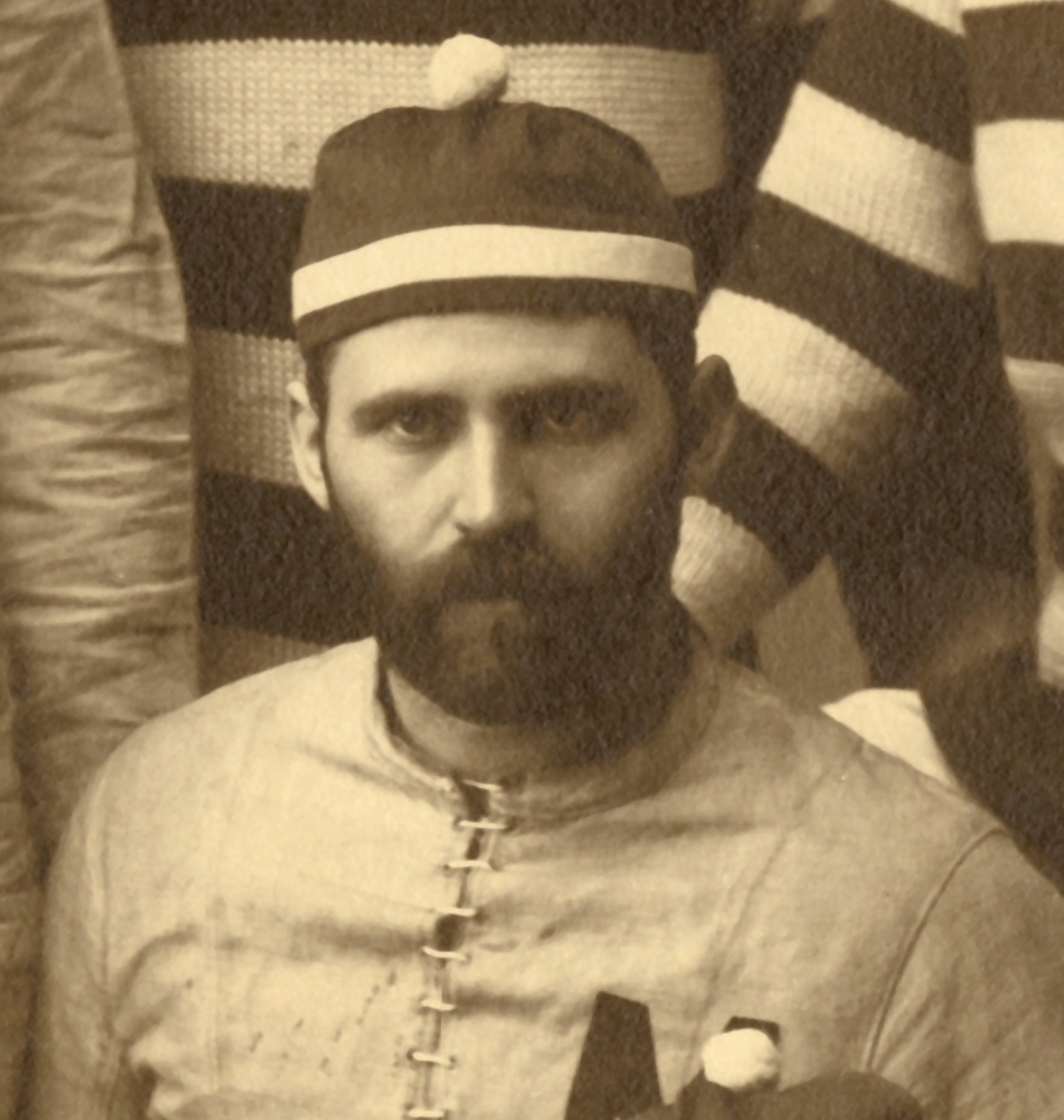
Horace Greely Prettyman played a record eight years on the Michigan football team between 1882 and 1890.

In early October 1884, The Michigan Argonaut (a University of Michigan weekly newspaper) wrote that prospects looked good for Michigan's rugby team. (The game of American football was evolving in 1884 and was sometimes referred to as rugby and sometimes as football.) The Argonaut noted that many students were gathering daily at the northeast corner of campus to practice for the fall games. With several key players returning, including Olcott, Prettyman, and Killilea, and many new prospects, the paper concluded "there is no reason why an eleven cannot be made up which will equal any Rugby team the University ever had."

The football team was managed by the university's Rugby Association. In early October, the Association met and elected Edward Adolphus Rosenthal as the president, Frank G. Higgins as the vice president, Ross L'Estrange Mahon as the treasurer, Edward Lester Dorn as the corresponding secretary, and James S. Skinner as the recording secretary. Henry Killilea was appointed as the manager. At a meeting held on the Tuesday before the Chicago game, Horace Greely Prettyman was elected as the team's captain.

In late October and early November, The Chronicle urged "every student who takes an interest in Rugby" to participate in the "scrub" or "practice" games or to try their hand at umpiring. Several lines above the notice about the scrub game, the introduction of a new technology was rumored: "There is rumor of the introduction of incandescent lights into Ann Arbor."

During the first week of November, the Albion College team invited the Michigan eleven to play a game at Albion on November 7. The team was unable to accept the invitation because the required permission from the faculty could not be secured. The Chronicle expressed its hope that a game with Albion could be arranged. Such a game was arranged for the following week in Ann Arbor.

=== Albion ===
The 1884 football team played its first game on November 15, 1884, against the team from Albion College. The game was the first meeting between the two programs. As Albion was the only other college in Michigan at that time with a football program, Michigan played Albion on a regular basis. The two programs played 16 games between 1884 and 1905, with Michigan winning 15 of those games.

Michigan won the inaugural game by a score of 18–0 in a match that was limited to a single inning. Michigan's 18 points were scored on three goals. The Chronicle (a weekly newspaper at the University of Michigan) wrote: "The Albion team was only recently organized, but nevertheless did some good playing. They proved themselves a gentlemanly set of fellows, and expressed their satisfaction at the treatment received."

The game was played at the Ann Arbor Fairgrounds and was part of university's annual field day. The program for the field day included a ten-mile walk, three-mile walk, “collar and elbow,” standing long jump, half mile run, “hop, step and jump,” heavyweight boxing (won by Higgins), tug-of-war, Indian club swinging (won by W. J. Olcott), hammer throw, "catch-as-catch-can wrestling," "passing rugby ball" (won by Thomas H. McNeil with a distance of 116 feet), drop-kick, 100 yard dash, sprint exhibition by Michigan's national collegiate sprint champion Fred N. Bonine, baseball throwing, “chasing greased pig,” obstruction race, lawn tennis, and the rugby game at 4:15 pm

The Detroit Free Press wrote that "[t]he game of Rugby between the University and Albion College [was] for the championship of Michigan." The Free Press wrote that growing interest in the new game was creating a market for weights in Ann Arbor stores:

"As a result of the field-day Rugby games a new invasion of villainous looking Indians clubs and weighty dumb bells occupies a conspicuous place in nearly all the stores resorted to by students. It is no uncommon thing to see a sprig of youth walk calmly into a store and come out again in a few minutes lugging a pair of dumb bells having enough iron to last a foundry a week; and he never fails to take his way homeward through the principal streets."

The Michigan team that played in the Albion game consisted of Prettyman, Brock, Wilson, Killilea, Goss, Dorn and Duff as "rushers"; McNeil as quarterback; Olcott and Jaycock as halfbacks; and Duffy as goalkeeper. Frank G. Higgins was reportedly "severely injured" in the game. The Chronicle reported a week later that Higgins "has been unable to attend lectures and can barely get out of his room by the aid of a crutch."

=== Chicago ===
On November 22, 1884, Michigan played its second and final game of the season, an 18–10 victory over a Chicago city team reportedly "composed of business men." The Chronicle reported that the Chicago city team was "made up almost wholly of Englishmen who learned to kick shins at the English public schools." The game began at 2:15 pm and was played before 200 spectators at the Ann Arbor Fairgrounds. In the first inning of play (the halves were referred to as "innings"), Goss scored a quick touchdown for Michigan, but Duffy missed the kick for goal. The game was played according to "American college rules" which put the Chicago team (nine of whom were Englishmen) at a disadvantage due its practice of playing under the English rugby rules. After Michigan's touchdown, the game was paused briefly to allow the Chicago team to receive instruction on the American rules. After the break, Chicago scored a touchdown and kicked the goal to take a 6–4 lead. Michigan kicked a field goal (six points) and scored another touchdown (four points) and led 14–6 at the end of the first inning. In the second inning, Chicago scored a quick touchdown to narrow Michigan's lead to 14–10. Michigan scored a final touchdown in the second inning but missed the kick for goal.

The Detroit Free Press called it a "very exciting and hotly contested game," but the paper criticized the poor condition of the playing field: "[I]t is due the Chicagoans to say that they played at a disadvantage on account of the unevenness of the field, which the home team were accustomed to." The Chicago Daily Tribune called it "A Fine Game of Foot-Ball." The Chronicle wrote: "The game was by far the finest ever witnessed in Ann Arbor and has greatly increased the interest in Rugby. Of the home team, Killilea, Olcott, Prettyman, and McNeil ought to be noticed for their fine playing.". The Chronicle also credited Duffy with "some good playing as goal-keeper" against Chicago.

Michigan's lineup against Chicago was Goss, Dorn, Duff, Prettyman, Beach, Schemm and Killilea (rushers), McNeil (quarterback), Olcott and Jaycox (halfbacks), and Duffy (goal keeper). A Michigan player, Higgins, was the umpire for Michigan. Wild was the umpire for Chicago.

Killilea was "severely hurt" in the game and was still carrying his arm in a sling two weeks later. He was replaced in the game by Charles E. Everett from the Class of 1887. A return game had been planned against the Chicago team for Thanksgiving Day in Chicago. However, the team did not make the trip due to the weather.

== Players ==
=== Varsity letter winners ===
William J. Duff became a medical doctor in Port Huron, Michigan.

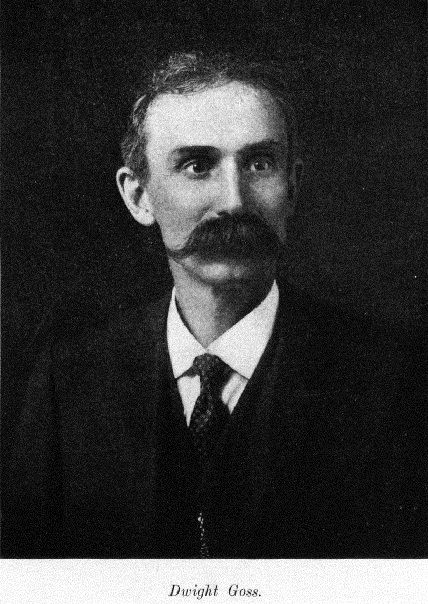
Dwight Goss became a lawyer in Grand Rapids, Michigan.

- Raymond Walter Beach, Atwood, Michigan – forward
- Edward L. Dorn, Ann Arbor, Michigan – forward
- William J. Duff, Oswego, New York – forward
- John L. Duffy, Ann Arbor, Michigan – goalkeeper
- Dwight Goss, St. Johns, Michigan – forward
- John M. Jaycox, Philadelphia, Pennsylvania – halfback
- Henry Killilea, Milwaukee, Wisconsin – center and manager
- Thomas H. McNeil, Burdette, Montana – quarterback
- William J. Olcott, Ishpeming, Michigan – halfback
- Horace Greely Prettyman, Bryan, Ohio – forward and captain

=== Others ===
- Charles Nathan Banks, Saline, Kansas – included in team portrait above, captain of class football team
- Henry Z. Brock, Holly, Michigan – substitute and member of the Rugby Association Executive Committee
- John A. Couch, Pittsburgh, Pennsylvania – substitute
- Charles E. Everett, Lansing, Michigan
- Frank G. Higgins – substitute and member of the Rugby Association Executive Committee
- George Christoph Schemm, Saginaw, Michigan – substitute
- Wilson

== Coaching staff ==
- Coach: no coach
- Captain: Horace Greely Prettyman
- Manager: Henry Killilea
