= 1895 Colorado Silver and Gold football team =

American college football season

1895 Colorado Silver and Gold football

CFA champion
- Conference: Colorado Football Association
- Record: 5–1 (3–0 CFA)
- Head coach: Fred Folsom (1st season)
- Captain: William Caley
- Home stadium: Campus Fields

1895 Colorado Football Association standings
	Conf.					Overall
Team	W		L		T	W		L		T
Colorado $	3	–	0	–	0	5	–	1	–	0
Colorado Mines	1	–	1	–	0	1	–	1	–	0
Denver	0	–	1	–	1	0	–	3	–	2
Colorado College	0	–	2	–	1	1	–	2	–	1
$ – Conference champion

The 1895 Colorado Silver and Gold football team was an American football team that represented the University of Colorado as a member of the Colorado Football Association (CFA) during the 1895 college football season. Led by first-year head coach Fred Folsom, Colorado compiled an overall record of 5–1 with a mark of 3–0 in conference play, winning the CFA title, the program's second conference championship.

Folsom served three stints as Colorado's head coach, from 1895 to 1899, 1901 to 1902, and 1908 to 1915, ending his tenure with the most wins in program history. Colorado Stadium was renamed as Folsom Field in 1944, following his death.

== Schedule ==
Date	Opponent	Site	Result
October 13	Manual High School*	Boulder, CO	W 36–0
October 26	Denver Wheel Club*	Boulder, CO	W 32–0
November 5	Denver	Boulder, CO	W 28–0
November 9	at Denver Athletic Club*	Denver, CO	L 10–22
November 16	at Colorado College	Colorado Springs, CO	W 38–10
November 28	Colorado Mines	Boulder, CO	W 14–10
*Non-conference game
