= 1884 Dartmouth football team =

American college football season

1884 Dartmouth football
- Conference: Independent
- Record: 1–2–1
- Head coach: None

1884 college football records
	Conf.			Overall
Team	W	L	T	W		L		T
Princeton		–		9	–	0	–	1
Yale		–		8	–	0	–	1
Michigan		–		2	–	0	–	0
Williams		–		2	–	0	–	0
Navy		–		1	–	0	–	0
Wabash		–		1	–	0	–	0
Penn		–		5	–	1	–	1
Fordham		–		5	–	1	–	0
Harvard		–		7	–	4	–	0
Wesleyan		–		3	–	2	–	0
Butler		–		1	–	1	–	0
Columbia		–		1	–	1	–	0
Rutgers		–		3	–	4	–	0
Stevens		–		4	–	5	–	0
Dartmouth		–		1	–	2	–	1
Tufts		–		2	–	4	–	1
Massachusetts		–		1	–	2	–	0
Lafayette		–		2	–	5	–	0
Johns Hopkins		–		1	–	3	–	0
Albion		–		0	–	1	–	0
CCNY		–		0	–	1	–	0
Denver		–		0	–	1	–	0
DePauw		–		0	–	1	–	0
Olivet		–		0	–	2	–	0
Amherst		–		0	–	3	–	0
Lehigh		–		0	–	4	–	0

The 1884 Dartmouth football team represented Dartmouth College in the 1884 college football season. Dartmouth compiled a record of 1–2–1.

== Schedule ==
Date	Opponent	Site	Result	Source
October 25	Yale	Hanover, NH	L 0–113	
November 10	Harvard	Hanover, NH (rivalry)	L 0–29	
November 15	Tufts	Hanover, NH	T 10–10	
November 26	vs. Tufts	Concord Base Ball Club grounds; Concord, NH	W 20–0	
