= 1884 Yale Bulldogs football team =

American college football season

1884 Yale Bulldogs football
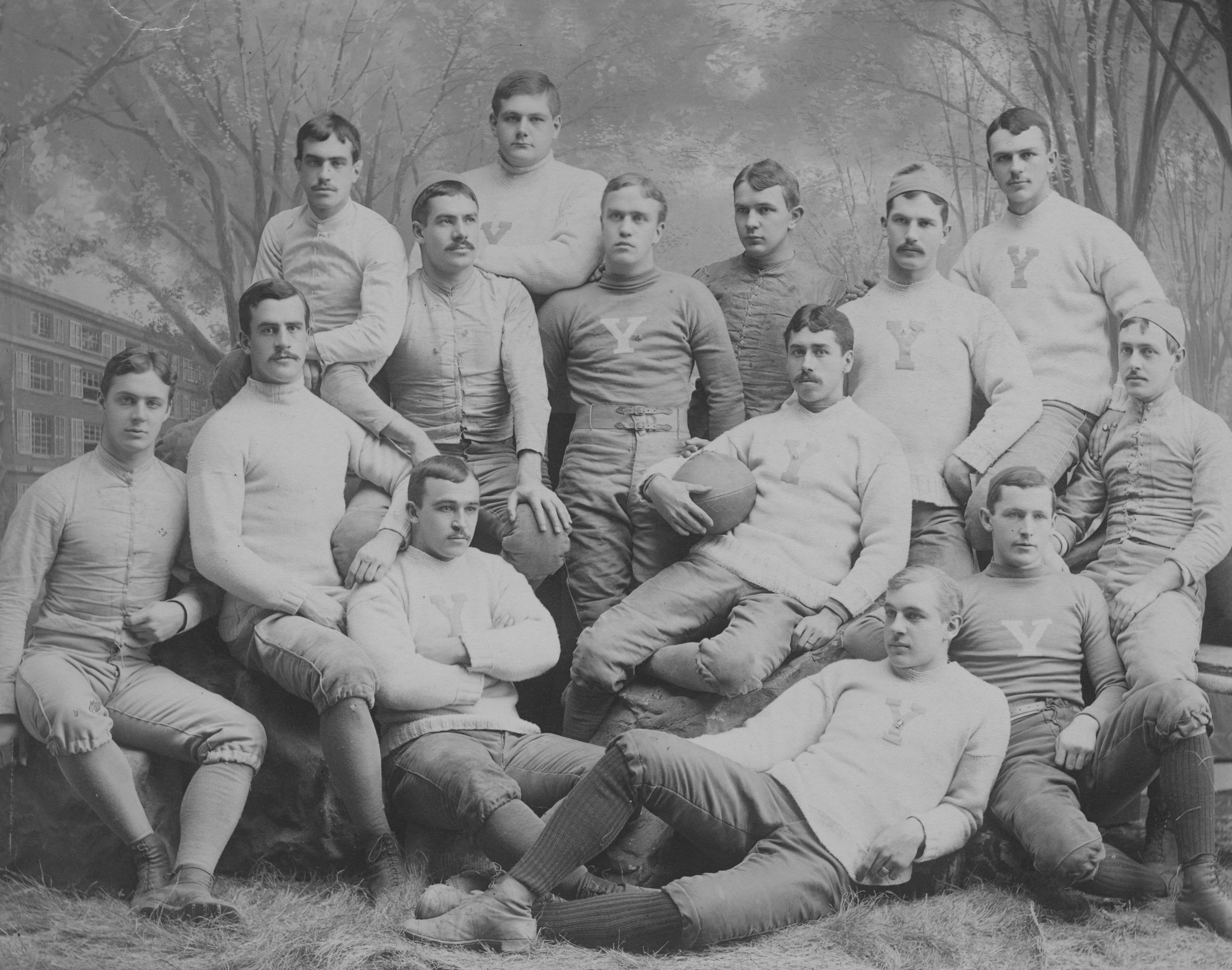

National champion (Helms, NCF) Co-national champion (Davis)
- Conference: Independent
- Record: 8–0–1
- Head coach: None
- Captain: Eugene Lamb Richards
- Home stadium: Yale Field

1884 college football records
	Conf.			Overall
Team	W	L	T	W		L		T
Princeton		–		9	–	0	–	1
Yale		–		8	–	0	–	1
Michigan		–		2	–	0	–	0
Williams		–		2	–	0	–	0
Navy		–		1	–	0	–	0
Wabash		–		1	–	0	–	0
Penn		–		5	–	1	–	1
Fordham		–		5	–	1	–	0
Harvard		–		7	–	4	–	0
Wesleyan		–		3	–	2	–	0
Butler		–		1	–	1	–	0
Columbia		–		1	–	1	–	0
Rutgers		–		3	–	4	–	0
Stevens		–		4	–	5	–	0
Dartmouth		–		1	–	2	–	1
Tufts		–		2	–	4	–	1
Massachusetts		–		1	–	2	–	0
Lafayette		–		2	–	5	–	0
Johns Hopkins		–		1	–	3	–	0
Albion		–		0	–	1	–	0
CCNY		–		0	–	1	–	0
Denver		–		0	–	1	–	0
DePauw		–		0	–	1	–	0
Olivet		–		0	–	2	–	0
Amherst		–		0	–	3	–	0
Lehigh		–		0	–	4	–	0

The 1884 Yale Bulldogs football team represented Yale University in the 1884 college football season. The team compiled an 8–0–1 record, shut out eight of nine opponents, and outscored all opponents, 495 to 10. The team was retroactively named as the national champion by the Helms Athletic Foundation and National Championship Foundation and as a co-national champion by Parke H. Davis.

== Schedule ==
Date	Time	Opponent	Site	Result	Attendance	Source
October 1		Wesleyan	Yale Field; New Haven, CT	W 31–0		
October 11		Stevens	Yale Field; New Haven, CT	W 96–0		
October 18	3:00 p.m.	vs. Wesleyan	Ward Street Grounds; Hartford, CT	W 63–0		
October 22		at Rutgers	New Brunswick, NJ	W 76–10		
October 25		at Dartmouth	Hanover, NH	W 113–0		
November 5		Wesleyan	Yale Field; New Haven, CT	W 46–0		
November 19		vs. Yale alumni	Yale Field; New Haven, CT	W 20–0		
November 22		Harvard	Yale Field; New Haven, CT (rivalry)	W 52–0	2,400	
November 27		vs. Princeton	Polo Grounds; New York, NY (rivalry)	T 0–0	over 10,000	

== Roster ==
- Rushers: Frederick W. Wallace, Samuel Reading Bertron, Robert N. Corwin, Henry R. Flanders, Frank G. Peters, Alexander B. Coxe, Reginald Ronalds, W. B. Goodwin, Sheffield, Lucius F. Robinson, R. S. Storrs, Oliver Gould Jennings
- Quarterback: T. L. Bayne
- Halfbacks: Eugene Lamb Richards, Wyllys Terry
- Fullbacks: Mahlon H. Marlin, George H. Young
