= 1884 Rutgers Queensmen football team =

American college football season

1884 Rutgers Queensmen football
- Conference: Independent
- Record: 3–4
- Head coach: None
- Captain: John DeWitt
- Home stadium: College Field

1884 college football records
	Conf.			Overall
Team	W	L	T	W		L		T
Princeton		–		9	–	0	–	1
Yale		–		8	–	0	–	1
Michigan		–		2	–	0	–	0
Williams		–		2	–	0	–	0
Navy		–		1	–	0	–	0
Wabash		–		1	–	0	–	0
Penn		–		5	–	1	–	1
Fordham		–		5	–	1	–	0
Harvard		–		7	–	4	–	0
Wesleyan		–		3	–	2	–	0
Butler		–		1	–	1	–	0
Columbia		–		1	–	1	–	0
Rutgers		–		3	–	4	–	0
Stevens		–		4	–	5	–	0
Dartmouth		–		1	–	2	–	1
Tufts		–		2	–	4	–	1
Massachusetts		–		1	–	2	–	0
Lafayette		–		2	–	5	–	0
Johns Hopkins		–		1	–	3	–	0
Albion		–		0	–	1	–	0
CCNY		–		0	–	1	–	0
Denver		–		0	–	1	–	0
DePauw		–		0	–	1	–	0
Olivet		–		0	–	2	–	0
Amherst		–		0	–	3	–	0
Lehigh		–		0	–	4	–	0

The 1884 Rutgers Queensmen football team represented Rutgers University in the 1884 college football season. The Queensmen compiled a 3–4 record and were outscored by their opponents, 184 to 155. The team had no coach, and its captain was John DeWitt.

== Schedule ==
Date	Time	Opponent	Site	Result	Source
October 4		Princeton	New Brunswick, NJ (rivalry)	L 5–23	
October 15		Columbia	New Brunswick, NJ	W 35–5	
October 18	2:40 p.m.	at Princeton	Princeton, NJ	L 0–35	
October 22		Yale	New Brunswick, NJ	L 10–76	
November 1		Lehigh	New Brunswick, NJ	W 61–0	
November 8		Lafayette	New Brunswick, NJ	W 26–0	
November 15	3:00 p.m.	vs. Wesleyan	Manhattan Athletic Club grounds; New York, NY	L 0–25	
