= 1884 Columbia football team =

American college football season

1884 Columbia football
- Conference: Independent
- Record: 1–1
- Head coach: None
- Captain: Charles A. Stevens

1884 college football records
	Conf.			Overall
Team	W	L	T	W		L		T
Princeton		–		9	–	0	–	1
Yale		–		8	–	0	–	1
Michigan		–		2	–	0	–	0
Williams		–		2	–	0	–	0
Navy		–		1	–	0	–	0
Wabash		–		1	–	0	–	0
Penn		–		5	–	1	–	1
Fordham		–		5	–	1	–	0
Harvard		–		7	–	4	–	0
Wesleyan		–		3	–	2	–	0
Butler		–		1	–	1	–	0
Columbia		–		1	–	1	–	0
Rutgers		–		3	–	4	–	0
Stevens		–		4	–	5	–	0
Dartmouth		–		1	–	2	–	1
Tufts		–		2	–	4	–	1
Massachusetts		–		1	–	2	–	0
Lafayette		–		2	–	5	–	0
Johns Hopkins		–		1	–	3	–	0
Albion		–		0	–	1	–	0
CCNY		–		0	–	1	–	0
Denver		–		0	–	1	–	0
DePauw		–		0	–	1	–	0
Olivet		–		0	–	2	–	0
Amherst		–		0	–	3	–	0
Lehigh		–		0	–	4	–	0

The 1884 Columbia football team was an American football team that represented Columbia University as an independent during the 1884 college football season. The team compiled a 1–1 record and was outscored by a total of 35 to 21. The team had no coach. Charles A. Stevens was the team captain.

== Schedule ==
Date	Opponent	Site	Result	Source
October 15	Rutgers		L 5–35	
October 16	CCNY	Central Park; New York, NY	W 16–0	
November 27	at Polytechnic Institute	Washington Park; Brooklyn, NY	W 22–6	

- The win over the Polytechnic Institute is not officially recognized in Columbia's record book.
