= Albion football, 1884–1889 =

American college football seasons

The Albion football teams (later known as the Albion Britons) represented Albion College in American football during the program's first decade from 1884 to 1889. In these years, Albion was one of the few college football teams in Michigan. Highlights include the following:

- Albion played its first intercollegiate game in 1884, defeating the team from Olivet College by a 10–5 score.
- In 1886, Albion defeated Michigan Agricultural College (now Michigan State University) by a 79–0 score.

== 1884 ==
1884 Albion football
- Conference: Independent
- Record: 2–1
- Head coach: Durand W. Springer (1st season)

1884 college football records
	Conf.			Overall
Team	W	L	T	W		L		T
Princeton		–		9	–	0	–	1
Yale		–		8	–	0	–	1
Michigan		–		2	–	0	–	0
Williams		–		2	–	0	–	0
Navy		–		1	–	0	–	0
Wabash		–		1	–	0	–	0
Penn		–		5	–	1	–	1
Fordham		–		5	–	1	–	0
Harvard		–		7	–	4	–	0
Wesleyan		–		3	–	2	–	0
Butler		–		1	–	1	–	0
Columbia		–		1	–	1	–	0
Rutgers		–		3	–	4	–	0
Stevens		–		4	–	5	–	0
Dartmouth		–		1	–	2	–	1
Tufts		–		2	–	4	–	1
Massachusetts		–		1	–	2	–	0
Lafayette		–		2	–	5	–	0
Johns Hopkins		–		1	–	3	–	0
Albion		–		0	–	1	–	0
CCNY		–		0	–	1	–	0
Denver		–		0	–	1	–	0
DePauw		–		0	–	1	–	0
Olivet		–		0	–	2	–	0
Amherst		–		0	–	3	–	0
Lehigh		–		0	–	4	–	0

In its first season of intercollegiate football, Albion's 1884 football team was led by head Durand W. Springer and compiled a 2–1 record.

=== Schedule ===
Date	Opponent	Site	Result	Source
	Olivet		W 10–5	
November 15	Michigan	Ann Arbor Fairgrounds; Ann Arbor, MI	L 0–18	
May 10	Olivet		W 10–2	

=== Game summaries ===
==== Michigan ====
On November 15, Albion lost to Michigan. The game was the first meeting between the two programs. As Albion and Michigan were the only two colleges in Michigan at that time with football programs, Albion played Michigan on a regular basis. The two programs played 16 games between 1884 and 1905, with Michigan winning 15 of those games.

Michigan won the inaugural game by a score of 18–0 in a match that was limited to a single inning. Michigan's 18 points were scored on three goals. The Chronicle (a weekly newspaper at the University of Michigan) wrote: "The Albion team was only recently organized, but nevertheless did some good playing. They proved themselves a gentlemanly set of fellows, and expressed their satisfaction at the treatment received."

The game was played at the Ann Arbor Fairgrounds and was part of university's annual field day. The program for the field day included a ten-mile walk, three-mile walk, “collar and elbow,” standing long jump, half mile run, “hop, step and jump,” heavyweight boxing (won by Higgins), tug-of-war, Indian club swinging (won by W. J. Olcott), hammer throw, "catch-as-catch-can wrestling," "passing rugby ball" (won by Thomas H. McNeil with a distance of 116 feet), drop-kick, 100 yard dash, sprint exhibition by Michigan's national collegiate sprint champion Fred N. Bonine, baseball throwing, “chasing greased pig,” obstruction race, lawn tennis, and the rugby game at 4:15 pm

The Detroit Free Press wrote that "[t]he game of Rugby between the University and Albion College [was] for the championship of Michigan." The Free Press wrote that growing interest in the new game was creating a market for weights in Ann Arbor stores:

"As a result of the field-day Rugby games a new invasion of villainous looking Indians clubs and weighty dumb bells occupies a conspicuous place in nearly all the stores resorted to by students. It is no uncommon thing to see a sprig of youth walk calmly into a store and come out again in a few minutes lugging a pair of dumb bells having enough iron to last a foundry a week; and he never fails to take his way homeward through the principal streets."

== 1885 ==
No games played.

== 1886 ==
1886 Albion football
- Conference: Independent
- Record: 2–1
- Head coach: Anson E. Hagle (1st season)

1886 Midwestern college football independents records
	Conf.			Overall
Team	W	L	T	W		L		T
Cincinnati		–		2	–	0	–	0
Michigan		–		2	–	0	–	0
Wabash		–		2	–	0	–	1
Albion		–		1	–	2	–	0
Northwestern		–		0	–	1	–	0
Minnesota		–		0	–	2	–	0

In its second season of intercollegiate football, Albion's 1886 football team was led by head coach Anson E. Hagle and compiled a 1–2 record.

=== Schedule ===
Date	Opponent	Site	Result	Source
October 16	Michigan	Albion, MI	L 0–18	
October 30	at Michigan	Ann Arbor Fairgrounds; Ann Arbor, MI	L 0–50	
	Michigan Agricultural		W 79–0	

=== Game summaries ===
==== Game one: Michigan 50, Albion 0 ====
The first game was played on October 16, 1886, at Albion, with Michigan winning by a score of 50–0. The Michigan Argonaut described the game as "a walk-over for our team." The score was already 37 to 0 when time was called for the half. The writer noted that the Albion team was "not in fine trim" and failed to get the ball near the Michigan goal. Perhaps trying to find something favorable to say about the opponent, the Argonaut reporter observed that "the Albion team did their best work in tackling."

==== Game two: Michigan 24, Albion 0 ====
The second game was played at the Ann Arbor Fairgrounds on October 30, 1886, as part of a "field day" that included various athletic events. Michigan won the football game, 24 to 0. The Michigan Argonaut noted, "The most striking difference between the elevens was that of weight, U. of M. presenting a much heavier team. It was evident, however, that Albion had come to play ball, and what they lacked in avoirdupois was in great measure made up by neat and rapid playing." The teams agreed to play "two innings of thirty minutes each," and the "rugby game" started at 3:35 with referee George W. Whyte calling, "Play." Michigan lost the toss, and Jaycox kicked off for Michigan, sending the ball near Albion's goal line. Michigan scored its first touchdown seven minutes into the game to take the lead 6 to 0. Michigan scored a second touchdown "just before the inning was called," and led 12 to 0 at the intermission. The second inning began at 4:40 p.m., and the Argonaut reported that "Albion played a much better game in this inning than did Michigan, and several times it looked as though they would score." Jaycox and Jim Duffy made several bad fumbles in the second inning, and Morrow, "who had been serving in first-class style one-fourth back, made several poor throws to the half backs and lost ground for Michigan." Jim Duffy made two brilliant runs in the inning, and Jaycox ran for a touchdown shortly before the game ended. Albion objected that the field was "overrun with spectators," and also claimed that Jaycox had run out of bounds on his touchdown run, but the claim was overruled. The Argonaut concluded its report on the game by noting, "The Albion boys were gentlemen, and played a square game."

== 1887 ==
1887 Albion football
- Conference: Independent
- Record: 0–1
- Head coach: None

1887 Midwestern college football independents records
	Conf.			Overall
Team	W	L	T	W		L		T
Michigan		–		5	–	0	–	0
Minnesota		–		2	–	0	–	0
Cincinnati		–		1	–	0	–	0
Washington University		–		1	–	0	–	0
Butler		–		2	–	1	–	0
Indiana		–		0	–	1	–	0
Purdue		–		0	–	1	–	0
Wabash		–		0	–	1	–	0
Notre Dame		–		0	–	3	–	0
Albion		–		0	–	1	–	0

In its third season of intercollegiate football, Albion's 1887 football team compiled a record of 0–1.

On November 12, 1887, Albion played its only game of the year against Michigan. The Chronicle of Ann Arbor reported: "The weather was fine, and the contest was witnessed by a fair crowd of spectators, but one that might have been larger." The game was preceded by the continuation of a wrestling match between two heavyweights named Malley and Jackson. Three hundred spectators watched the wrestling match, which lasted for between 30 and 45 minutes. The football game began between 3:00 p.m. and 3:30 p.m. Albion kicked off to start the game and Duffy immediately kicked the ball back to the middle of the field. In a scrimmage that followed, John Duffy "slipped through", scored Michigan's first touchdown, and kicked the goal from touchdown to give Michigan a 6–0 lead. Michigan scored two additional touchdowns and a safety in the first half (or "inning"), with the scores being made by Jim Duffy, Royal Farrand and Ernest Sprague. After a ten-minute break between halves, neither team scored in the first 18 minutes of the second half. John Duffy scored Michigan's fourth touchdown, and the kick for goal was successful. James Duffy scored Michigan's fifth touchdown, "the ball coming to him on the bound from the punt-out."

=== Schedule ===
Date	Opponent	Site	Result	Source
November 12	at Michigan	Ann Arbor Fairgrounds; Ann Arbor, MI	L 0–32	

== 1888 ==
1888 Albion football
- Conference: Independent
- Record: 0–2
- Head coach: None
- Captain: Multiple

1888 Midwestern college football independents records
	Conf.			Overall
Team	W	L	T	W		L		T
Cincinnati		–		1	–	0	–	1
Notre Dame		–		1	–	0	–	0
Washington University		–		1	–	0	–	0
Michigan		–		2	–	1	–	0
Northwestern		–		2	–	1	–	0
Lake Forest		–		2	–	2	–	0
Minnesota		–		1	–	1	–	0
Indiana		–		0	–	0	–	1
Miami (OH)		–		0	–	0	–	1
Albion		–		0	–	2	–	0

The 1888 Albion football team, sometimes known as the Albion Methodists, was an American football team that represented Albion College in the Michigan Intercollegiate Athletic Association (MIAA) during the 1888 college football season. The team compiled a 0–2 record, and was outscored by a combined total of 84 to 4. Albion scheduled two of its games in 1888 against opponents that later became NCAA Division I FBS football programs, which today are among the top five in winning percentage and total wins at that level.

=== Schedule ===
Date	Time	Opponent	Site	Result	Source
November 24		at Michigan	Ann Arbor Fairgrounds; Ann Arbor, MI	L 4–76 or 4–80	
December 1		at Notre Dame	Notre Dame, IN	cancelled	
December 1	2:15 p.m.	at Detroit Athletic Club	Detroit Athletic Park; Detroit, MI	L 0–18	

=== Game summaries ===
==== Michigan ====
On November 24, 1888, Albion lost by a 76–4 score to the 1888 Michigan Wolverines football team at the Ann Arbor Fairgrounds. Albion's four points were awarded after the visitors disputed a call made by the officials and threatened to leave the grounds. The Albion players were persuaded to continue with the game "upon a concession of four points by the home team." The Detroit Free Press called it "a splendid game" with "some excellent team work being done by the 'Varsity eleven." The Chronicle wrote: "As usual U. of M. had a walk away. Albion scored her first point through an error."

==== Detroit Athletic Club ====
On December 1, Albion lost by an 18-0 score against the Detroit Athletic Club (DAC) in a game played at the Detroit Athletic Park in Detroit. On the opening possession, Albion drove to DAC's 25-yard line but failed to convert on a fourth down. After that drive, DAC dominated the game. The Detroit Free Press credited Albion tackle S.C. Griffin, as well as halfbacks Landau and Critchell for their play. Led by team captains, the team compiled an 0-2 record.

== 1889 ==
No games played.
