= Washington College (Tacoma) =

- Active: 1884–1892
- Religious affiliation: Episcopal Church
- Location: Tacoma, Washington, United States

Washington College was a school in Tacoma, Washington. It was founded in Seattle, Washington in 1884 with an initial enrollment of 45 students. Washington College was sponsored by the Episcopal Church. Its companion school in Tacoma was the Annie Wright Seminary for Girls.

On January 24, 1891, Washington College played the 1890 Washington football team to a 6–6 tie. This match at the Eleventh Street Grounds in Tacoma was the University of Washington football team's first intercollegiate game and second overall game.

The 1891–92 school year was the last with students. A proposed spring 1893 re-opening was coincident with the Panic of 1893, and never took place. The school officially closed in 1896, with its remaining assets dispersed to Annie Wright Seminary.
