= 1884 Butler Christians football team =

American college football season

1884 Butler Christians football
- Conference: Independent
- Record: 1–1
- Head coach: None

1884 college football records
	Conf.			Overall
Team	W	L	T	W		L		T
Princeton		–		9	–	0	–	1
Yale		–		8	–	0	–	1
Michigan		–		2	–	0	–	0
Williams		–		2	–	0	–	0
Navy		–		1	–	0	–	0
Wabash		–		1	–	0	–	0
Penn		–		5	–	1	–	1
Fordham		–		5	–	1	–	0
Harvard		–		7	–	4	–	0
Wesleyan		–		3	–	2	–	0
Butler		–		1	–	1	–	0
Columbia		–		1	–	1	–	0
Rutgers		–		3	–	4	–	0
Stevens		–		4	–	5	–	0
Dartmouth		–		1	–	2	–	1
Tufts		–		2	–	4	–	1
Massachusetts		–		1	–	2	–	0
Lafayette		–		2	–	5	–	0
Johns Hopkins		–		1	–	3	–	0
Albion		–		0	–	1	–	0
CCNY		–		0	–	1	–	0
Denver		–		0	–	1	–	0
DePauw		–		0	–	1	–	0
Olivet		–		0	–	2	–	0
Amherst		–		0	–	3	–	0
Lehigh		–		0	–	4	–	0

The 1884 Butler Christians football team represented Butler University during the 1884 college football season. On May 31, the team beat DePauw in the first football game ever played in the state of Indiana. That fall, Butler lost to Wabash.

== Schedule ==
Date	Time	Opponent	Site	Result	Source
May 31	3:30 p.m.	DePauw	7th Street Base Ball Park; Indianapolis, IN	W 16–0	
October 25		Wabash	Indianapolis, IN	L 0–4	

== See also ==
- List of the first college football game in each US state
