= 1891 California Golden Bears football team =

American college football season

1891 California Golden Bears football
- Conference: Independent
- Record: 0–1
- Head coach: None
- Captain: John H. White

1891 Far West college football independents records
	Conf.			Overall
Team	W	L	T	W		L		T
Stanford		–		3	–	1	–	0
California (spring)		–		4	–	2	–	0
Washington		–		1	–	1	–	0
USC		–		1	–	2	–	0
Colorado		–		1	–	4	–	0
California		–		0	–	1	–	0

The 1891 California Golden Bears football team was an American football team that represented the University of California, Berkeley during the 1891 college football season. The team competed as an independent, without a head coach, and compiled a record of 0–1.

== Schedule ==
Date	Opponent	Site	Result
March 7	San Francisco Club	Berkeley, CA	L 0–36
