= 1890 Colorado Silver and Gold football team =

American college football season

1890 Colorado Silver and Gold football
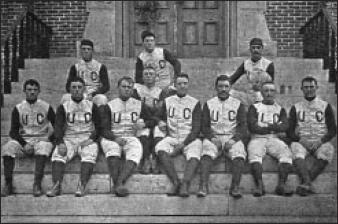
- Conference: Independent
- Record: 0–4
- Head coach: None
- Captains: C. L. Edmundson; John Nixon
- Home stadium: Campus Fields

1890 Far West college football independents records
	Conf.			Overall
Team	W	L	T	W		L		T
California		–		4	–	0	–	0
Washington		–		0	–	0	–	1
Colorado		–		0	–	4	–	0

The 1890 Colorado Silver and Gold football team was an American football team that represented the University of Colorado as an independent during the 1890 college football season. The team was the first team to represent the University of Colorado. Colorado has no head coach and compiled a record of 0–4.

== Schedule ==
Date	Opponent	Site	Result
November 15	at Denver Athletic Club	Denver, CO	L 0–20
November 22	Colorado Mines	Boulder, CO	L 0–103
November 29	at Colorado Springs A.A.	Colorado Springs, CO	L 0–44
December 13	Colorado Mines	Boulder, CO	L 4–50
