= 1890 California Golden Bears football team =

American college football season

1890 California Golden Bears football
- Conference: Independent
- Record: 4–0
- Head coach: None
- Captain: Fred W. McNear

1890 Far West college football independents records
	Conf.			Overall
Team	W	L	T	W		L		T
California		–		4	–	0	–	0
Washington		–		0	–	0	–	1
Colorado		–		0	–	4	–	0

The 1890 California Golden Bears football team was an American football team that represented the University of California, Berkeley during the 1890 college football season. The team competed as an independent, without a head coach, and compiled a record of 4–0.

== Schedule ==
Date	Time	Opponent	Site	Result	Source
January 11		Posens	Berkeley, CA	W 6–4	
February 8	3:00 p.m.	Posens	Berkeley, CA	W 16–0	
February 15		Posens	Berkeley, CA	W 11–0	
March 1	2:30 p.m.	Posens	Berkeley, CA	W 12–0	
All times are in Pacific time
