= 1890 Washington football team =

American college football season

1890 Washington football
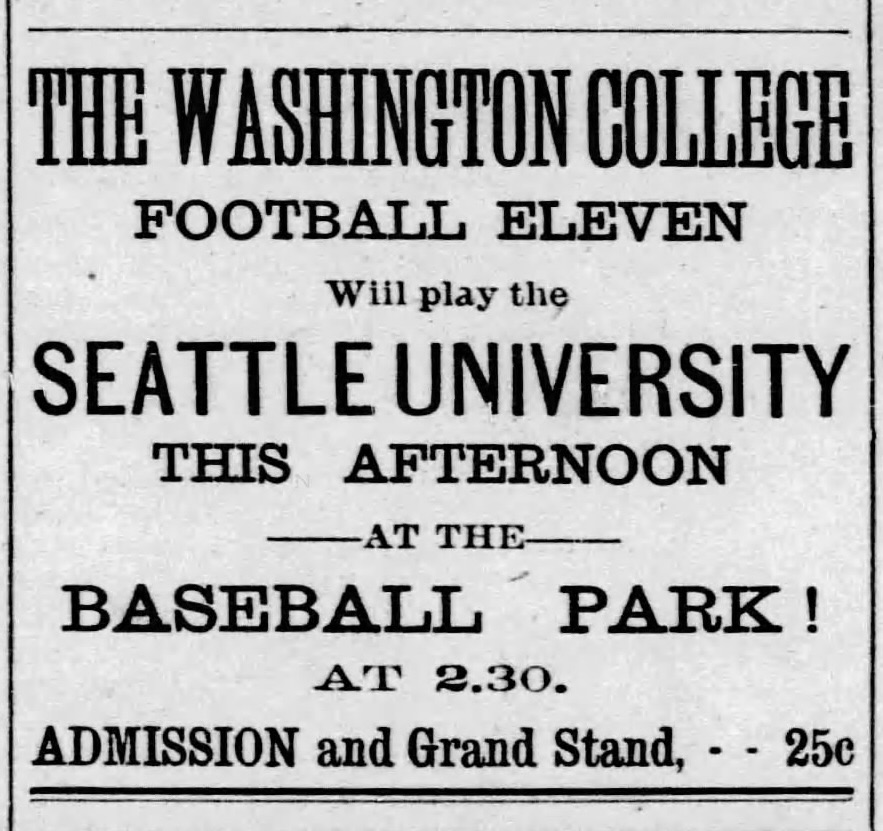
- Conference: Independent
- Record: 0–0–1
- Head coach: None
- Captain: Frank S. Griffith

1890 Far West college football independents records
	Conf.			Overall
Team	W	L	T	W		L		T
California		–		4	–	0	–	0
Washington		–		0	–	0	–	1
Colorado		–		0	–	4	–	0

The 1890 Washington football team was an American football team that represented the University of Washington as an independent during the 1890 college football season. The team played only one game, tying Washington College, 6–6, on January 24, 1891 in Tacoma. For the second consecutive year, Frank S. Griffith was the team captain.

== Schedule ==
Date	Time	Opponent	Site	Result	Source
January 24, 1891	2:20 p.m.	at Washington College (WA)	Eleventh Street Grounds; Tacoma, WA	T 6–6	
