= Colorado Football Association =

One of the earliest American college football conferences

- Founded: 1890
- Folded: 1908
- Sports fielded: College football
- No. of teams: 3–5

The Colorado Football Association or Colorado Intercollegiate Athletic Conference, was one of the earliest college football conferences in the United States, with its membership centered on the state of Colorado. The league existed from 1890 to 1908. After folding in 1908, all of its members subsequently founded the Rocky Mountain Athletic Conference, which remains in existence today as a Division II conference.

== Champions ==
Membership varied from three to five teams each year. The following is a list of annual champions.

- 1890 – Colorado Mines
- 1891 – Colorado Mines
- 1892 – Colorado Mines
- 1893 – Colorado Mines
- 1894 – Colorado
- 1895 – Colorado
- 1896 – Colorado
- 1897 – Colorado
- 1898 – Colorado Mines
- 1899 – Colorado College
- 1900 – Colorado College
- 1901 – Colorado
- 1902 – Colorado
- 1903 – Colorado
- 1904 – Colorado Mines
- 1905 – Colorado Mines
- 1906 – Colorado Mines
- 1907 – Colorado Mines
- 1908 – Colorado & Denver

== See also ==
- List of Colorado Football Association standings
- List of defunct college football conferences
