= Denver Athletic Club =

Club in Denver, Colorado

- U.S. National Register of Historic Places
- Colorado State Register of Historic Properties
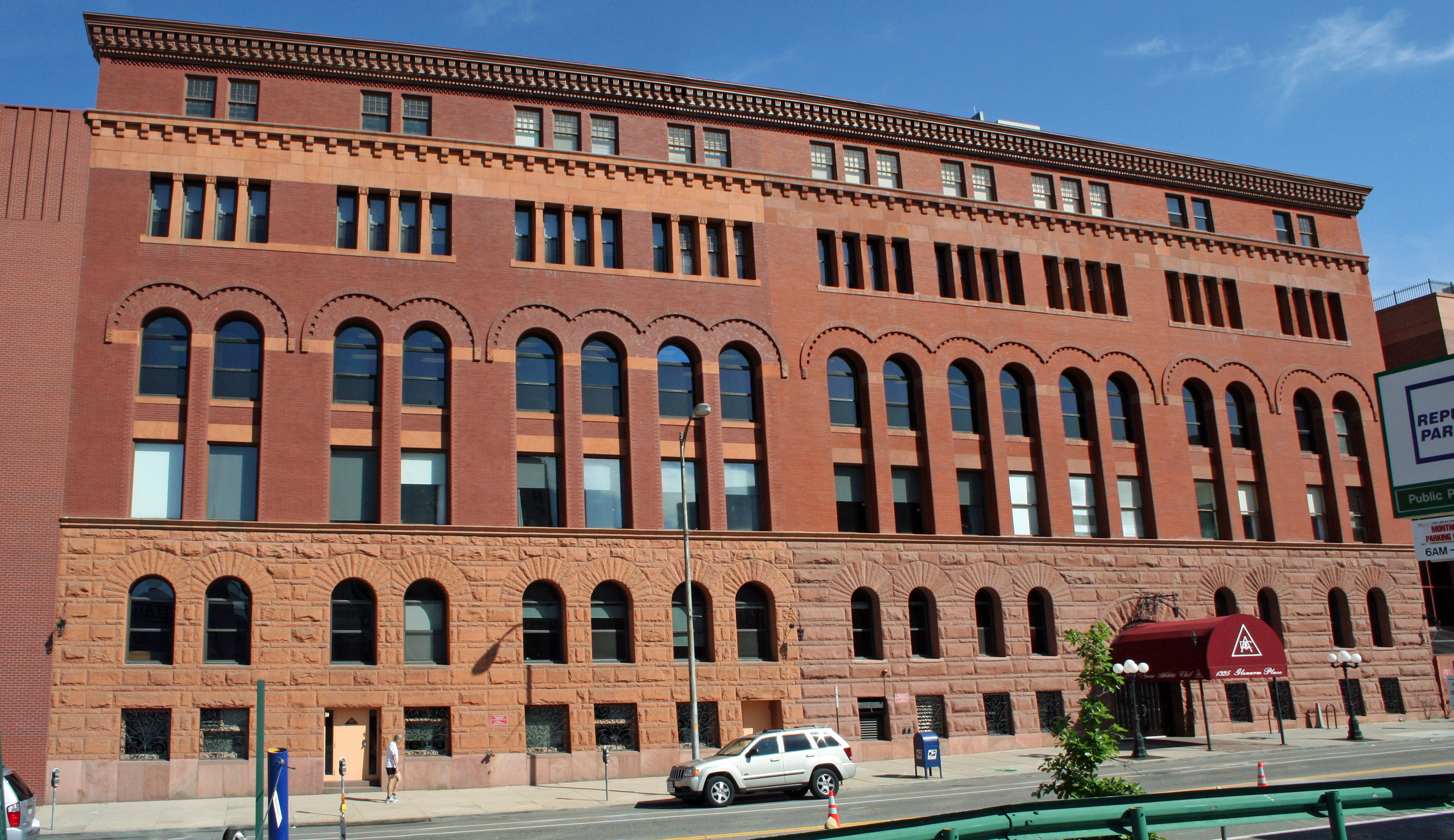
- The Denver Athletic Club occupies a full city block in downtown Denver. The member-owned private club has amenities for fitness, swimming, co-working, socializing, dining and private meetings & events.

- Location within Colorado Location within the United States
- Location: 1325 Glenarm Pl., Denver, Colorado
- Coordinates: 39°44′30″N 104°59′35″W
- Area: less than one acre
- Built: 1889
- Architect: Varian, E.P.; Sterner, Frederick J.
- Architectural style: Romanesque Revival
- NRHP reference No.: 79000580
- CSRHP No.: 5DV.149
- Added to NRHP: November 14, 1979

The Denver Athletic Club, founded in 1884, is a private athletic and social club that is member-owned. Located in Downtown Denver, Colorado, United States. Residing in the historical 1325 Glenarm Place near the Colorado Convention Center, The DAC was added to the U.S. National Register of Historic Places in 1979.

The club is organized under United States laws for 501(c)(7) Social and Recreation Clubs. In 2024, it claimed total revenue of $14,168,052 and total assets of $19,122,097.

== History ==
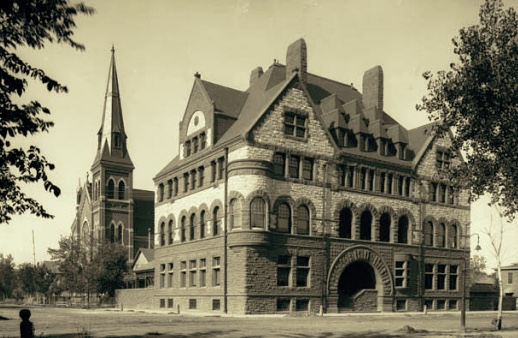
Denver Athletic Club in 1890

Founded in 1884 and located in the heart of Denver, the Denver Athletic Club is one of the oldest and largest private city clubs in the United States. It is consistently ranked one of the top ten athletic clubs in the country and offers members everything they need to work, play, exercise, network and socialize.

The Denver Athletic Club's athletic facilities include a large fitness center, six racquetball courts, a squash center with seven courts, a full-size basketball/volleyball court, five group exercise studios, an indoor golf simulator and a 25-meter indoor swimming pool.

As a business center and networking facility, the DAC also has meeting and conference rooms, a grand ballroom, a sundeck and a brand-new luxury coworking space.

Members may enjoy access to a licensed childcare center, a full-service spa and wellness center, and social events.

While the amenities are exceptional, The Denver Athletic Club is set apart by its community. A member-owned club, The DAC is operated for the benefit of its membership.

The first home of The DAC was converted from the First Baptist Church on 18th near Curtis. It featured a gymnasium and a clubhouse with a large, handsome Denver Athletic Club sign on the front and with the purpose of "encouraging all proper athletic sports and pastimes of any kind and nature whatsoever". William D. Rathvon, is regarded as its founding father. Additionally, John Elitch, who would later open Elitch Gardens, is credited as helping "inspire" and organize the club.

In the fall of 1890, The DAC moved out of the small secondhand church into its new five-story building at the present location on the corner of 14th and Glenarm. On November 15, 1890, it opened an athletic field with a football game versus the University of Colorado. In 1900, a library was started and grew to hold over 8,000 titles. An addition was completed in 1892 and the 70-foot structure was one of the tallest buildings in Denver for several years, visible from every corner of the city center.

Further additions in the 1920s, 1970s, 1980s and 1990s transformed The DAC into the leading city club in the Rocky Mountain West. For over a century it has been a leader in both fitness and networking and has served at the forefront of Denver’s social scene.
