= DePauw football, 1884–1889 =

American college football seasons

The DePauw football program from 1884 to 1899 represented DePauw University in its first decade of college football competition. The team did not take on the nickname "Tigers" until 1918. DePauw did not play any intercollegiate games between 1885 and 1888.

== 1884 ==
1884 DePauw football
- Conference: Independent
- Record: 0–1
- Head coach: None (1st season)

The 1884 DePauw football team represented DePauw University during the 1884 college football season. The team had no head coach and played only one game, on May 31, losing to Butler. It was the first football game played in the state of Indiana.

=== Schedule ===
Date	Time	Opponent	Site	Result	Source
May 31	3:30 p.m.	at Butler	7th Street Base Ball Park; Indianapolis, IN	L 0–4	

== 1889 ==
1889 DePauw football
- Conference: Independent
- Record: 0–1–1
- Head coach: Wilmer Glenn (1st season)

The 1889 DePauw football team represented DePauw University as an independent during the 1889 college football season. Led by first-year head coach Wilmer Glenn, DePauw compiled a record of 0–1–1.

=== Schedule ===
Date	Time	Opponent	Site	Result	Source
November 16	3:00 p.m.	at Purdue	Baseball park; Lafayette, IN	L 10–34	
November 23		Indiana	Greencastle, IN	T 6–6	
