= 1879 Racine College football team =

Explanation of what the Racine College football team is

1879 Racine College football
- Conference: Independent
- Record: 0–1
- Head coach: no coach
- Home stadium: none

1879 college football records
	Conf.			Overall
Team	W	L	T	W		L		T
Princeton		–		4	–	0	–	1
Yale		–		3	–	0	–	2
Massachusetts		–		1	–	0	–	0
Michigan		–		1	–	0	–	1
Haverford		–		1	–	0	–	1
Harvard		–		2	–	1	–	2
Penn		–		2	–	2	–	0
Amherst		–		1	–	1	–	0
Navy		–		0	–	0	–	1
McGill		–		0	–	0	–	1
Toronto		–		0	–	0	–	1
Stevens		–		1	–	2	–	5
Rutgers		–		1	–	2	–	3
Pennsylvania Military		–		0	–	1	–	1
NYU		–		0	–	2	–	1
Racine		–		0	–	1	–	0
Swarthmore		–		0	–	1	–	0
Columbia		–		0	–	3	–	2

The 1879 Racine College football team represented Racine College during the 1879 college football season. Racine and the University of Michigan inaugurated college football in the Midwest with a match played on May 30, 1879. Michigan won, 1–0.
