= William Hannan (disambiguation) =

William Hannan may refer to:

- William Hannan (painter) (died c. 1775), Scottish draughtsman and painter
- William W. Hannan (1854–1917), American real estate developer
- William Hannan (1906-1987), Scottish Labour Party politician
