= 1879 college football season =

American college football season

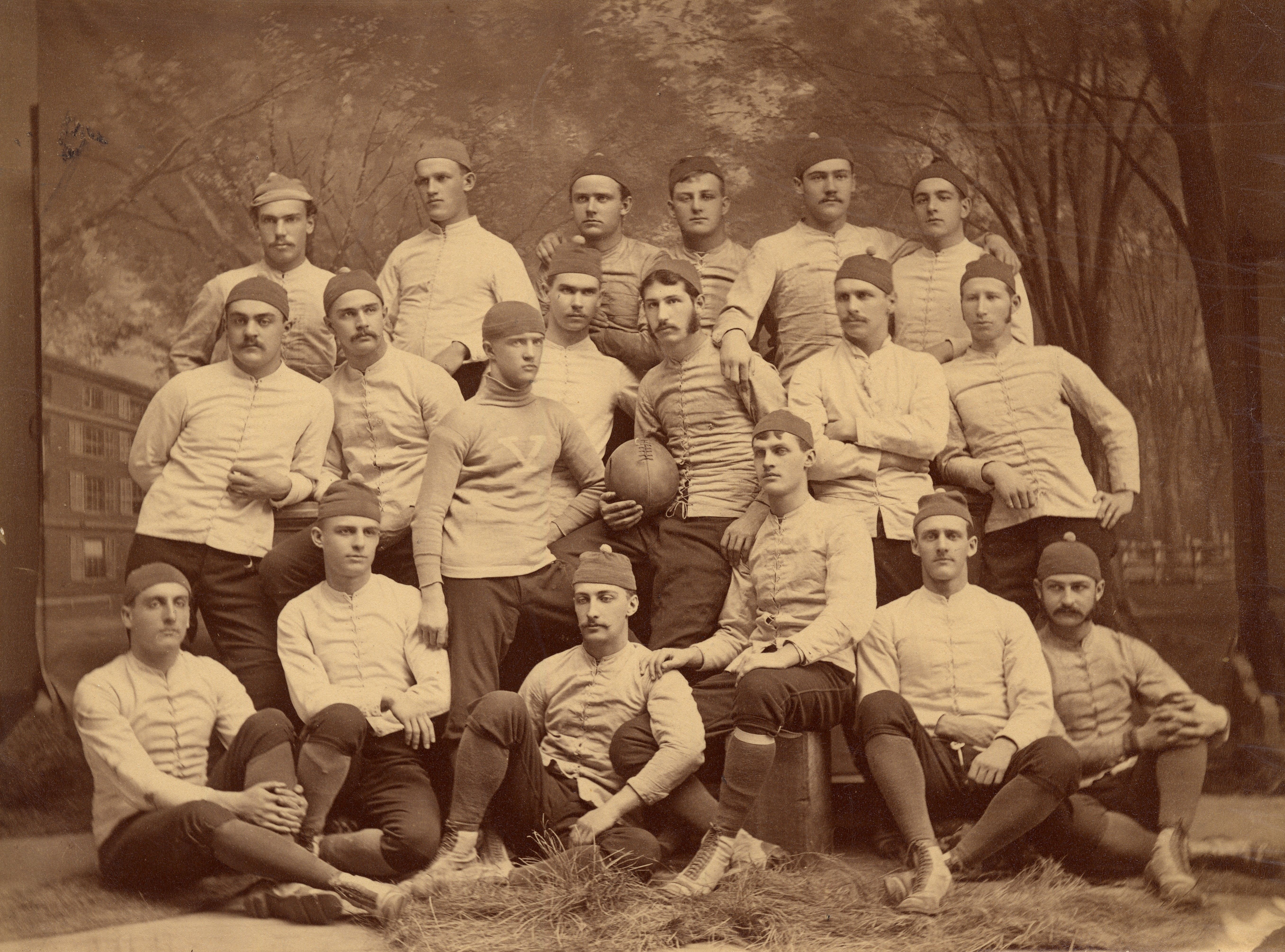
- 1879 Yale Bulldogs
- Total No. of teams: 18
- Regular season: October 9 to December 13
- Champion(s): Princeton; Yale

The 1879 college football season had no clear-cut champion, with the Official NCAA Division I Football Records Book listing Princeton and Yale having been selected as national champions.

Racine College and the University of Michigan played the first football game in the Midwest. The 1879 Michigan Wolverines football team beat Racine in a game played in Chicago.

The US Naval Academy also had its first game; the team did not have a coach until 1890.

== Conference and program changes ==
Team	Former conference	New conference
Michigan Wolverines	Program established	Independent
Massachusetts Aggies	Program established	Independent
Haverford Fords	Program established	Independent
Navy Midshipmen	Program established	Independent
Pennsylvania Military	Program established	Independent
Racine College	Program established	Independent
Toronto	Program established	Independent

== Conference standings ==
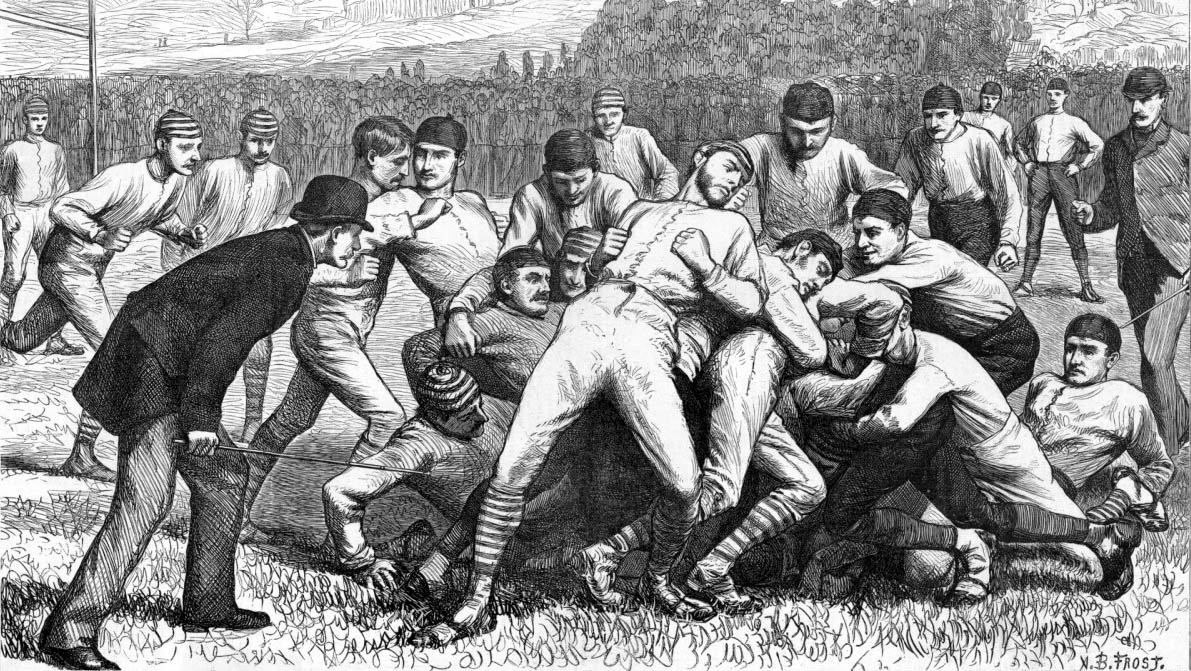
Depiction of the Princeton v Yale game by Arthur B. Frost

1879 college football records
	Conf.			Overall
Team	W	L	T	W		L		T
Princeton		–		4	–	0	–	1
Yale		–		3	–	0	–	2
Massachusetts		–		1	–	0	–	0
Michigan		–		1	–	0	–	1
Haverford		–		1	–	0	–	1
Harvard		–		2	–	1	–	2
Penn		–		2	–	2	–	0
Amherst		–		1	–	1	–	0
Navy		–		0	–	0	–	1
McGill		–		0	–	0	–	1
Toronto		–		0	–	0	–	1
Stevens		–		1	–	2	–	5
Rutgers		–		1	–	2	–	3
Pennsylvania Military		–		0	–	1	–	1
NYU		–		0	–	2	–	1
Racine		–		0	–	1	–	0
Swarthmore		–		0	–	1	–	0
Columbia		–		0	–	3	–	2
