= Charles H. Campbell =

American football player, lawyer, and civic leader (1858–1927)

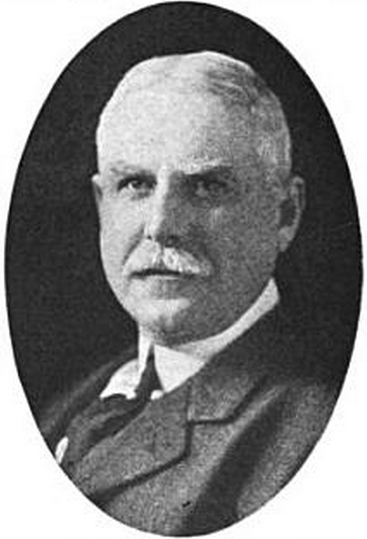
- Charles H. Campbell, c. 1918
- Born: June 18, 1858; Detroit, Michigan
- Died: November 26, 1927 (aged 69)
- Citizenship: United States
- Education: University of Michigan
- Known for: Lawyer and civic leader

Charles Hotchkiss Campbell (June 18, 1858 – November 26, 1927) was an American football player, lawyer, and civic leader in Detroit, Michigan. He was a graduate of the University of Michigan where he played college football for the 1879 Michigan Wolverines football team, the first football team to represent the University of Michigan.

Campbell was born in Detroit in 1858. His father, James V. Campbell, was a New York native who came to Detroit at age three in 1826. His father was a regent and law professor at the University of Michigan and a member of the Michigan Supreme Court. His mother, Cornelia (Hotchkiss) Campbell, was also a native of New York.

Campbell attended the public schools and high schools in Detroit, graduating in 1876. He enrolled at the University of Michigan in 1876 and completed "the Latin and scientific course." While studying at Michigan, Campbell played at the halfback position for the 1879 Michigan Wolverines football team, the first football team to represent the University of Michigan. The first football game for the University of Michigan was a May 30, 1879, game against Racine at White Stockings field in Chicago. Campbell took the opening kickoff in that first football game, a play described in a newspaper the next day as follows:

Campell in football attire, 1879

The University team won the choice and let the Racine team have the kick. Johnston made a fair kick which was caught by Campbell and carried forward some distance by good runs and skilled throwing to others of our team.

Campbell was also a member of the Delta Kappa Epsilon fraternity while at Michigan. A notebook kept by Campbell while he was a student at Michigan from 1879 to 1880, which includes lecture notes from James B. Angell's courses in political economy and international law, is maintained in the collections of the University of Michigan's Bentley Historical Library. Campbell received a Bachelor of Philosophy degree from the University of Michigan in 1880.

Campbell studied law at the office of Alfred Russell starting in 1880, and was admitted to the Michigan Bar in 1882. He went into practice with Russel at the firm of Russell & Campbell in 1886. The firm later became known as Russell, Campbell & Bulkley (1905–1907), and later as Russell, Campbell, Bulkley & Ledyard (1907–1912), and eventually Campbell, Bulkley & Ledyard (after 1912). Campbell specialized in conveyancing and trusts. In his history of the City of Detroit, Clarence M. Burton wrote: "For many years Mr. Campbell has been recognized as one of the most eminent members of the Michigan bar."

Campbell was also active in Detroit's civic affairs. In 1920, he was selected as the president of the Detroit Board of Commerce. He also served as the secretary of the Woodlawn Cemetery Association, trustee of Detroit's famed Mariners' Church, treasurer and director of the River Rouge Improvement Co., and a member of the board of trustees of the Protestant Episcopal diocese of Michigan.

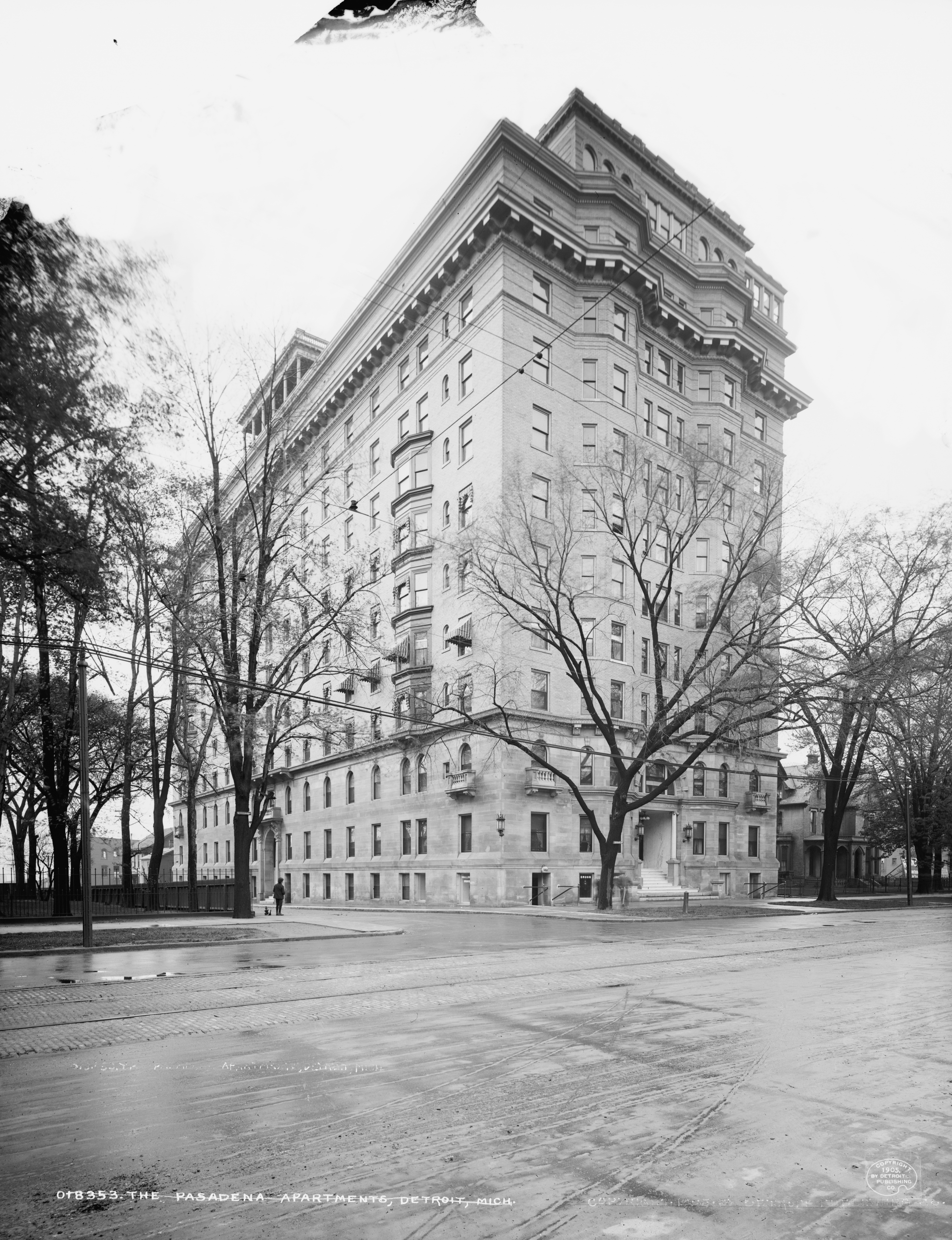
Pasadena Apartments — at 2170 East Jefferson Avenue, Detroit, Michigan (c. 1905).

In the 1910s, Campbell lived in the Pasadena Apartments, then one of the most fashionable apartment houses in Detroit. Campbell never married. At the time of the 1910 United States census, Campbell lived in Apartment 148 at the Pasadena Apartments with his sister, Cornelia.
