= Bland Ballard (American football) =

American football player

Profile
- Position: Forward

Personal information
- Born: September 22, 1855; Kentucky, U.S.
- Died: February 4, 1909 (aged 53); Lake Forest, Illinois, U.S.

Career information
- College: Princeton (1877–1879)

Awards and highlights
- National championship (1877, 1878, 1879)

Bland Ballard Jr. (September 22, 1855 – February 4, 1909) was an American college football player for the Princeton Tigers in the 19th century. He was captain of the 1879 team.

Ballard shot himself on the campus of Lake Forest College, in Lake Forest, Illinois, on February 4, 1905.
