= Charles S. Mitchell =

American newspaper publisher and editor (1856–1922)

- Mitchell cropped from the 1879 Michigan football team portrait
- Born: November 13, 1856; Wilkinsburg, Pennsylvania
- Died: January 9, 1922 (aged 65); Washington, D.C.
- Citizenship: United States
- Education: University of Michigan
- Known for: Newspaper publisher and editor

Charles Sumner Mitchell (November 13, 1856 – January 9, 1922) was an American newspaper publisher and editor. He was the assistant editor of the St. Cloud Journal-Press from 1881 to 1894, the publisher of the Alexandria Post-News from 1894 to 1920, the editor-in-chief of the Duluth News Tribune from 1906 to 1920 and of the Washington Herald from 1920 until his death in 1922. He also served two terms as the president of the Minnesota Editorial Association. He was a graduate of the University of Michigan where he played college football as the goalkeeper for the 1879 Michigan Wolverines football team—the first football team to represent the University of Michigan.

== Early years ==
Mitchell was born in Wilkinsburg, a suburb of Pittsburgh, Pennsylvania, in 1856. His parents, Henry Zehring Mitchell and Elizabeth Ann (Cannon) Mitchell, were both Pennsylvania natives. He moved with his parents as an infant to St. Cloud, Minnesota, in May 1857. His father operated a store in St. Cloud as a drygoods and clothing merchant and general agent.

Mitchell's early education was in the schools of St. Cloud, Minnesota. He received his preparatory education at Ann Arbor High School.

Mitchell's aunt, Jane Swisshelm, was a noted journalist, abolitionist, and women's rights advocate who published the first newspaper in St. Cloud, Minnesota—The Saint Cloud Visitor. During Mitchell's childhood, his older brother, William Bell Mitchell (born May 14, 1843), purchased his aunt's printing plant and operated the St. Cloud Press, later known as the St. Cloud Journal-Press.

== University of Michigan ==
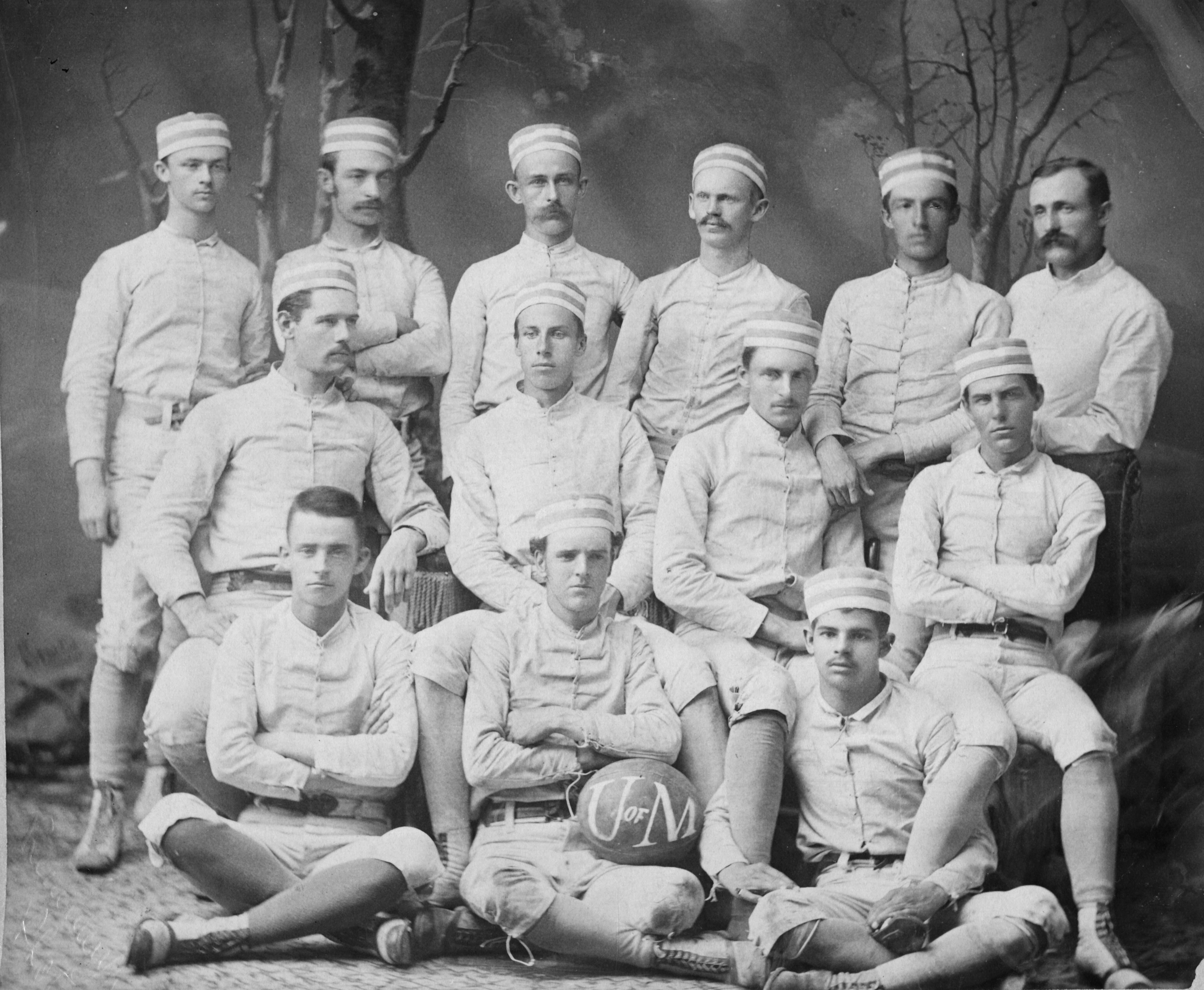
1879 Michigan football team

Mitchell enrolled in the literary department at the University of Michigan in the fall of 1876. While at Michigan, he was the founder of the Athletic Association at the university. He played college football for the 1879 Michigan Wolverines football team—the first football team to represent the University of Michigan. Mitchell played at the goalkeeper position in the first game played by a Michigan football team, a game against Racine at White Stockings grounds in Chicago. The game was described at the time as "the finest game of Rugby foot-ball ever played this side of the Alleghanies." While at Michigan, Mitchell was also a member of the Zeta Psi fraternity, captain of the senior football team, president of the Athletic Association, editor of the Oracle, editor of the Palladium (the University of Michigan yearbook), a member of Gamma Kappa Epsilon, and secretary of the Football Association. Mitchell graduated from the University of Michigan with a Bachelor in Philosophy degree in 1880.

== Newspaper editor ==
After graduating from Michigan, Mitchell was admitted to the Minnesota Bar in December 1881. However, he spent his career in the newspaper business rather than as a lawyer. Mitchell began his newspaper career working with his brother at the St. Cloud Journal-Press. He was the assistant editor of the St. Cloud Journal-Pres from 1881 to 1894. In 1894, he purchased the Douglas County News (Douglas County, Minnesota) and the Alexandria Post (Alexandria, Minnesota). He consolidated the two newspapers into the Alexandria Post News and became its publisher and editor. At the time of the 1900 United States census, Mitchell was living in Alexandria, Minnesota, with his wife, Ella, and their daughter, Elizabeth. His occupation was listed at that time as an editor. He was the publisher of the Alexandria Post-News during its entire run from 1894 to 1920.

Mitchell later became the editor of the Fairbanks, Minnesota News. From approximately 1906 to 1920, Mitchell was the editor of the Duluth News Tribune. Under Mitchell's editorship, the Duluth News Tribune was one of the first newspaper to advocate the United States' entry into World War I. He was also twice elected as the president of the Minnesota Editorial Association.

In 1920, Mitchell accepted the position of editor-in-chief with the Washington Herald in Washington, D.C.

== Family and death ==
In August 1884, Mitchell was married to Elora Thompson (born 1864) of Butler, Pennsylvania. They had one daughter, Elizabeth Ann Mitchell (born March 20, 1891). He was later married to Rizpah DeL. Mitchell. They had a daughter (Adade) and a son (Scott).

Mitchell died in January 1922 at his home in Washington, D.C. According to an obituary in The New York Times, Mitchell's death was due indirectly to a nervous breakdown. Another newspaper attributed his death to "heart trouble following an illness of a few weeks."
