= 1879 Princeton Tigers football team =

American college football season

1879 Princeton Tigers football
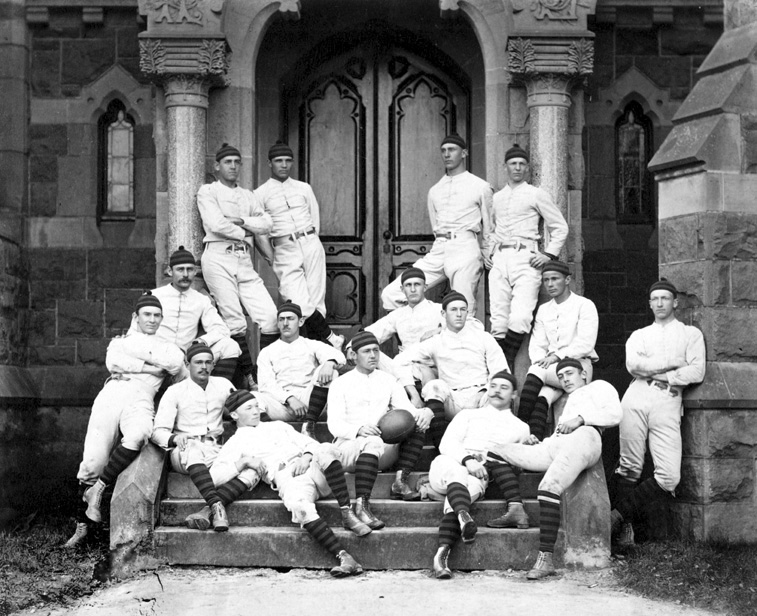

National champion (Billingsley, NCF) Co-national champion (Davis)
- Conference: Independent
- Record: 4–0–1
- Head coach: None
- Captain: Bland Ballard

1879 college football records
	Conf.			Overall
Team	W	L	T	W		L		T
Princeton		–		4	–	0	–	1
Yale		–		3	–	0	–	2
Massachusetts		–		1	–	0	–	0
Michigan		–		1	–	0	–	1
Haverford		–		1	–	0	–	1
Harvard		–		2	–	1	–	2
Penn		–		2	–	2	–	0
Amherst		–		1	–	1	–	0
Navy		–		0	–	0	–	1
McGill		–		0	–	0	–	1
Toronto		–		0	–	0	–	1
Stevens		–		1	–	2	–	5
Rutgers		–		1	–	2	–	3
Pennsylvania Military		–		0	–	1	–	1
NYU		–		0	–	2	–	1
Racine		–		0	–	1	–	0
Swarthmore		–		0	–	1	–	0
Columbia		–		0	–	3	–	2

The 1879 Princeton Tigers football team represented the College of New Jersey, then more commonly known as Princeton College, in the 1879 college football season. The team finished with a 4–0–1 record and was retroactively named national champion by the Billingsley Report and National Championship Foundation and as co-national champion by Parke H. Davis. This season was Princeton's ninth national championship, and one of 11 in a 13-year period between 1869 and 1881. The team's captain was Bland Ballard.

== Schedule ==
Date	Time	Opponent	Site	Result	Attendance	Source
October 18		Penn	Princeton, NJ (rivalry)	W 6–0		
November 1		Columbia	Princeton Athletic Grounds; Princeton, NJ	W 2–0		
November 8		Stevens	Princeton Athletic Grounds; Princeton, NJ	W 7–0		
November 15	3:10 p.m.	vs. Harvard	St. George's Cricket Club grounds; Hoboken, NJ (rivalry)	W 1–0	3,000	
November 27	2:40 p.m.	vs. Yale	St. George's Cricket Club grounds; Hoboken, NJ (rivalry)	T 0–0	6,000–7,000	
