= William W. Hannan =

American businessman (1854–1917)

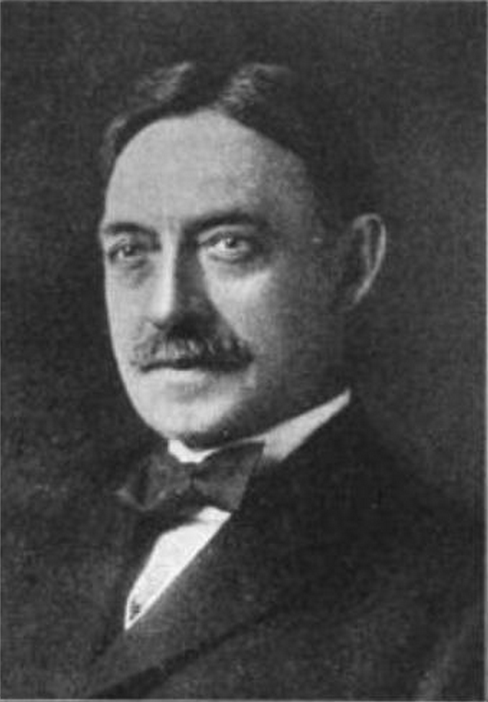
- Born: William Washington Hannan; July 4, 1854; Rochester, New York, United States
- Died: December 24, 1917 (aged 63); Detroit, Michigan, United States
- Education: University of Michigan
- Known for: Real estate developer and realtor

Signature
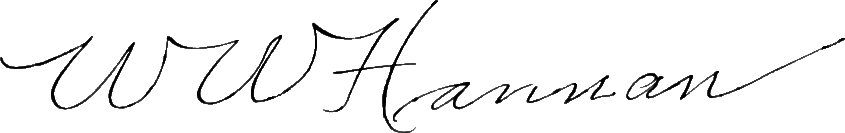

William Washington Hannan (July 4, 1854 – December 24, 1917) was a real estate developer and the first president of the National Association of Real Estate Exchanges (now National Association of Realtors).

== Early years ==
Hannan was born in Rochester, New York in 1854. He moved to Dowagiac, Michigan, at age two. He graduated from Dowagiac High School in 1873 and enrolled at the preparatory school at Oberlin College in Ohio from 1874-1876.

== University of Michigan ==
In 1876, he enrolled at the University of Michigan, receiving a degree from the classical department in 1880 and a bachelor of law degree in 1883. While attending Michigan, Hannan won a reputation as one of the university's best athletes and "made an especially good record as a sprinter." Hannan also played for the Michigan baseball team, and for the first intercollegiate football team to represent the University of Michigan, as a "rusher" for the 1879 Michigan Wolverines football team. While studying law at Michigan, he also worked as the "engrossing and enrolling clerk" in the lower house of the Michigan State Legislature.

== Business career ==
In 1883, Hannan associated with Judge William L. Carpenter in a law practice known as Carpenter & Hannan. After practicing law for a year, Hannan entered the real estate business, initially in partnership with Herbert N. Snow under the name Hannan & Snow Company. That firmed dissolved after a few months, and, in 1885, Hannan net founded the Hannan Real Estate Exchange, which he operated for more than 30 years. By 1891, Hannan had established himself at "the top of the list" among Detroit's real estate men. The Hannan Exchange handled many of the Detroit's large real estate transactions. He was involved in the sale of land at Griswold and Congress Streets where the new owners built the 23-story Ford Building, which was considered "one of the finest office structures in the city," and held the title as tallest building in Detroit from 1909 until 1913.

Hannan in his later years

Hannan was also a real estate developer, opening and improving many subdivisions, including the Park Hill, Medbury, Baldwin Park and Dailey Park subdivisions. The Medbury's-Grove Lawn Subdivisions Historic District was listed on the National Register of Historic Places in 1988. For his efforts in developing subdivisions with houses that were affordable to the working man, Hannan won the admiration of Detroit's laborers. In 1906, the Michigan Federation of Labor wrote:

Perhaps no one individual has done more to enhance the growth of Detroit and promote the interests of wage-earners than William W. Hannan, the real estate hustler. ... [He] is so well known that the name 'Hannan' and 'real estate' are synonymous. Mr. Hannan believes that the man who fails to buy a home for his family is cheating himself and losing a splendid opportunity of purchasing valuable lots in the city and suburbs at reasonable prices.

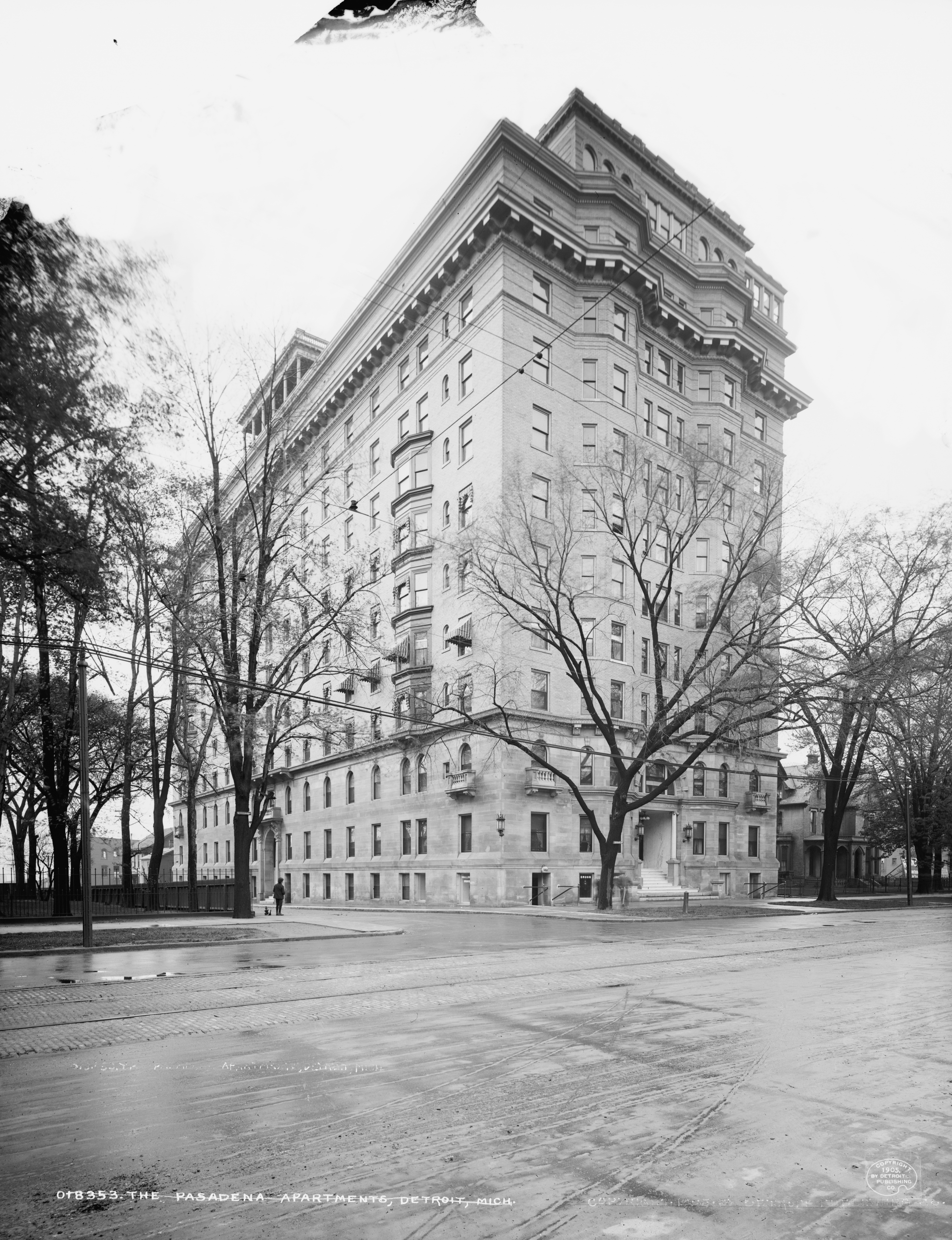
Pasadena Apartments c. 1905

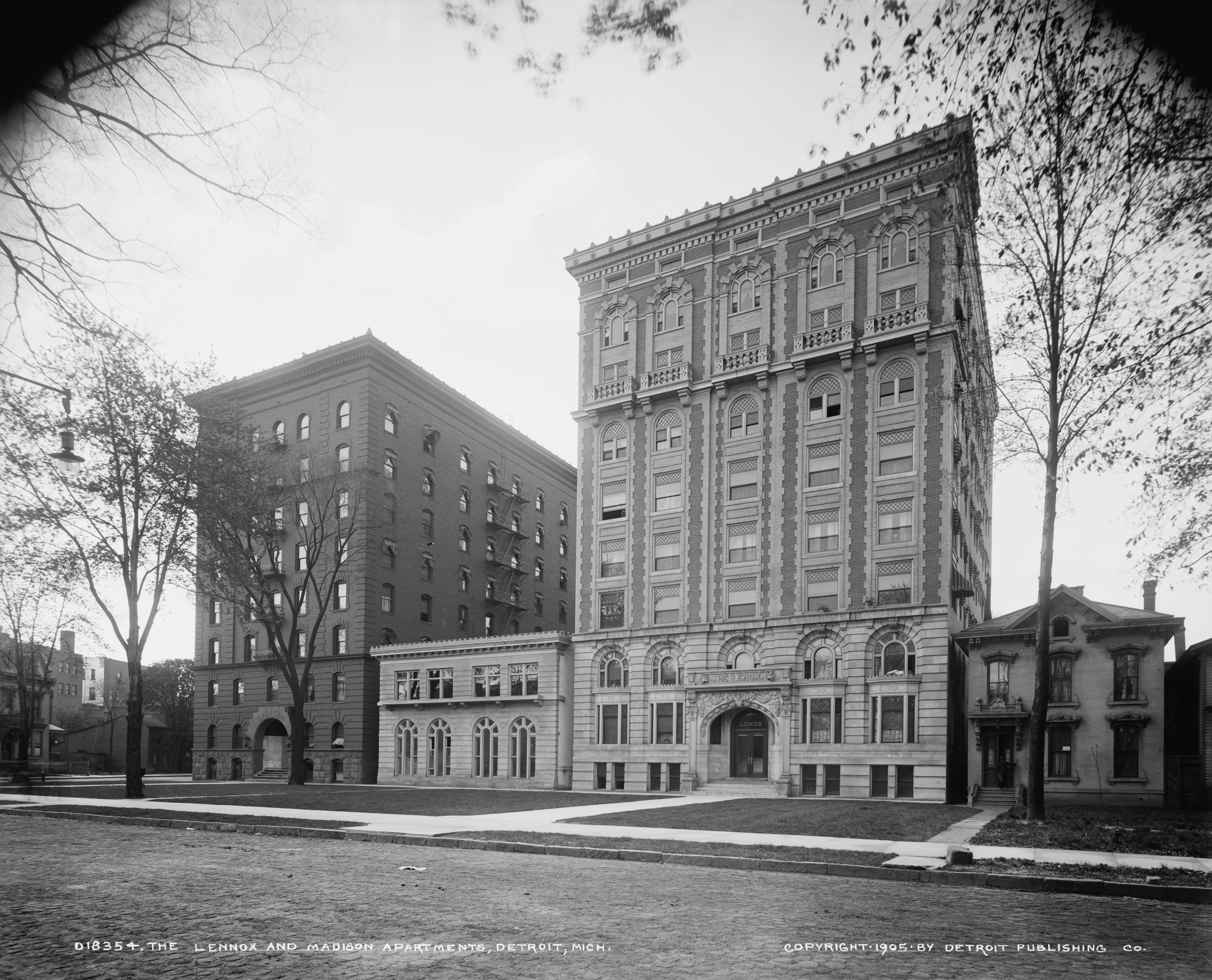
Madison-Lenox c. 1904

Hannan also became known as one of the leading builders of apartment buildings west of New York. The apartment hotels built and owned by Hannan included the Pasadena (where he lived) and the Madison-Lenox. Those three buildings were the largest and most modern apartment buildings in Detroit. In 2004, the National Trust for Historic Preservation added the Madison-Lenox to its "11 Most Endangered Historic Places", a list of buildings and locations across the United States in danger of demolition or damage due to neglect. In May 2005, the building was demolished by its owner Ilitch Holdings to make room for a parking lot. The Pasadena, an early example of upper-class, multi-unit housing, at 2170 East Jefferson Avenue, still exists and was listed on the National Register of Historic Places in 1985.

In 1909, Hannan served as the first president of the National Association of Real Estate Exchanges (now National Association of Realtors). Hannan was also a member of the Detroit Board of Estimates and the Detroit Board of Commerce, one of the founders of the Detroit Athletic Club, a Scottish Rite Mason and "a staunch Republican."

== Family and death ==
In 1881, he married Luella Greene Beaman. Hannan had no children, and, in 1915, his nephew Guy S. Greene assumed leadership of the Hannan Exchange. Hannan died in December 1918. At the time of his death, Hannan's estate was estimated at more than $4 million. He left two-thirds of his estate to Detroit charities, including the Children's Aid Society.
