= 1879 Amherst football team =

American college football season

1879 Amherst football
- Conference: Independent
- Record: 1–1
- Head coach: None

1879 college football records
	Conf.			Overall
Team	W	L	T	W		L		T
Princeton		–		4	–	0	–	1
Yale		–		3	–	0	–	2
Massachusetts		–		1	–	0	–	0
Michigan		–		1	–	0	–	1
Haverford		–		1	–	0	–	1
Harvard		–		2	–	1	–	2
Penn		–		2	–	2	–	0
Amherst		–		1	–	1	–	0
Navy		–		0	–	0	–	1
McGill		–		0	–	0	–	1
Toronto		–		0	–	0	–	1
Stevens		–		1	–	2	–	5
Rutgers		–		1	–	2	–	3
Pennsylvania Military		–		0	–	1	–	1
NYU		–		0	–	2	–	1
Racine		–		0	–	1	–	0
Swarthmore		–		0	–	1	–	0
Columbia		–		0	–	3	–	2

The 1879 Amherst football team represented Amherst College during the 1879 college football season. The team beat Williston and lost to Massachusetts.

== Schedule ==
Date	Opponent	Site	Result	Source
October 18	Williston Seminary		W 30–6	
November 22	at Massachusetts	Alumni Field; Amherst, MA	L 0–4	
