= 1879 Pennsylvania Military Academy football team =

American college football season

1879 Widener Pride football
- Conference: Independent
- Record: 0–1–1

1879 college football records
	Conf.			Overall
Team	W	L	T	W		L		T
Princeton		–		4	–	0	–	1
Yale		–		3	–	0	–	2
Massachusetts		–		1	–	0	–	0
Michigan		–		1	–	0	–	1
Haverford		–		1	–	0	–	1
Harvard		–		2	–	1	–	2
Penn		–		2	–	2	–	0
Amherst		–		1	–	1	–	0
Navy		–		0	–	0	–	1
McGill		–		0	–	0	–	1
Toronto		–		0	–	0	–	1
Stevens		–		1	–	2	–	5
Rutgers		–		1	–	2	–	3
Pennsylvania Military		–		0	–	1	–	1
NYU		–		0	–	2	–	1
Racine		–		0	–	1	–	0
Swarthmore		–		0	–	1	–	0
Columbia		–		0	–	3	–	2

The 1879 Pennsylvania Military Academy football team represented Pennsylvania Military Academy during the 1879 college football season. The team played Swarthmore, Penn, and as one cadet put it, “whoever we could inveigle into coming to us.”

The game against the Crescents Football Club was reported to be first game played at the Military Academy. The result of the contest with Swarthmore is not known.

== Schedule ==
Date	Time	Opponent	Site	Result	Source
October 25	3:00 p.m.	Crescents	Chester, PA	T 0–0	
November 1		Swarthmore	Chester, PA	Unknown	
November 8		Penn	Chester, PA	L 0–6	
All times are in Eastern time
