= 1879 Penn Quakers football team =

American college football season

1879 Penn Quakers football
- Conference: Independent
- Record: 2–2
- Head coach: None
- Captain: F. M. Dick

1879 college football records
	Conf.			Overall
Team	W	L	T	W		L		T
Princeton		–		4	–	0	–	1
Yale		–		3	–	0	–	2
Massachusetts		–		1	–	0	–	0
Michigan		–		1	–	0	–	1
Haverford		–		1	–	0	–	1
Harvard		–		2	–	1	–	2
Penn		–		2	–	2	–	0
Amherst		–		1	–	1	–	0
Navy		–		0	–	0	–	1
McGill		–		0	–	0	–	1
Toronto		–		0	–	0	–	1
Stevens		–		1	–	2	–	5
Rutgers		–		1	–	2	–	3
Pennsylvania Military		–		0	–	1	–	1
NYU		–		0	–	2	–	1
Racine		–		0	–	1	–	0
Swarthmore		–		0	–	1	–	0
Columbia		–		0	–	3	–	2

The 1879 Penn Quakers football team represented the University of Pennsylvania in the 1879 college football season. The team finished with a 2–2 record.

== Schedule ==
Date	Time	Opponent	Site	Result	Source
October 18		at Princeton	Princeton, NJ (rivalry)	L 0–6	
November 1		vs. Yale	St. George's Cricket Club grounds; Hoboken, NJ	L 0–3	
November 8		at Pennsylvania Military Academy	Chester, PA	W 6–0	
November 15	3:15 p.m.	Columbia	Young America Cricket Club grounds; Philadelphia, PA	W 1–0	
