= Walter Irving Badger =

American football player and lawyer (1859–1926)

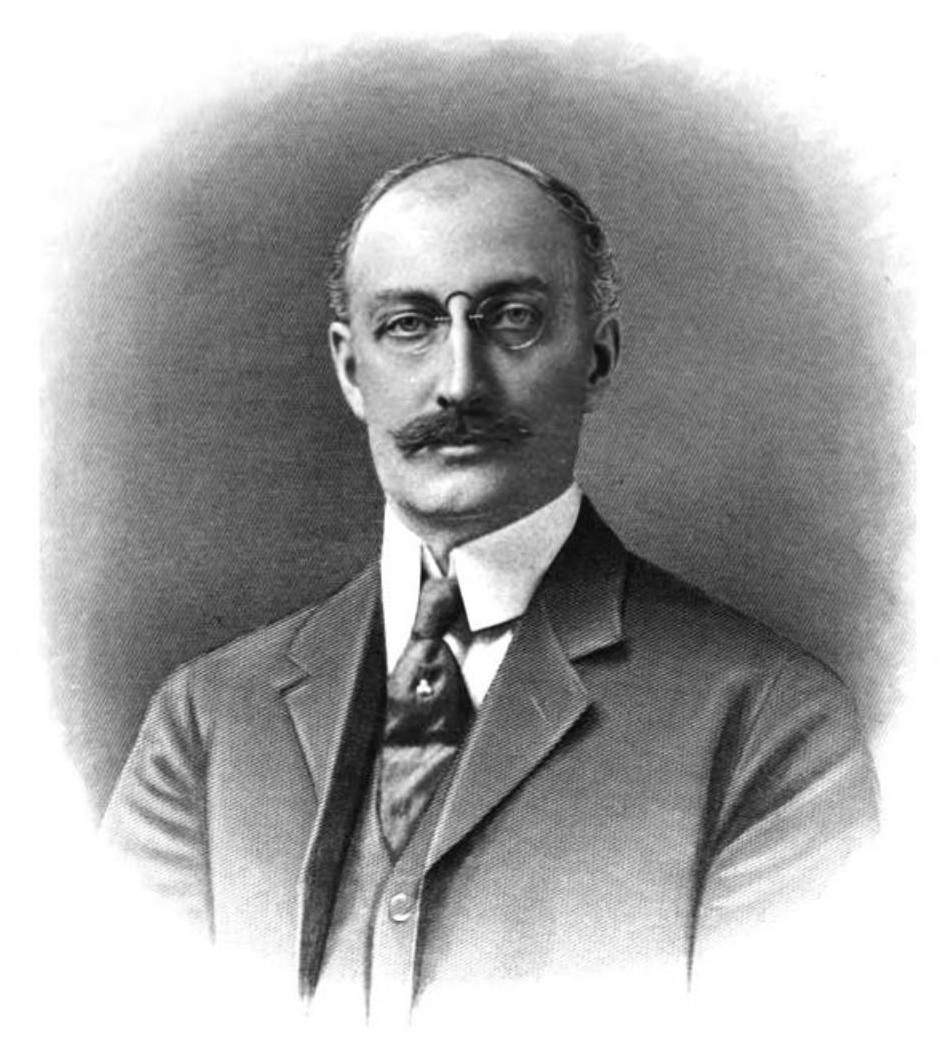

Yale Bulldogs
- Position: Quarterback

Personal information
- Born: January 15, 1859; Boston, Massachusetts, U.S.
- Died: March 17, 1926 (aged 67); Cambridge, Massachusetts, U.S.

Career information
- College: Yale (1879–1881)

Awards and highlights
- National championship (1879, 1880, 1881)

Walter Irving Badger (January 15, 1859 – March 17, 1926) was an American football player and lawyer.

Badger was the quarterback on the undefeated 1879, 1880 and 1881 Yale Bulldogs football teams that have been recognized for winning three consecutive national championships. He was the quarterback in the same backfield with Walter Camp. He was also captain of the Yale baseball team.

Badger later became a Boston lawyer who was involved in many notable suits, including representation of Thomas Lawson, accused of stock manipulation, and Boston Gas Co. in 120 suits arising out of an 1897 gas explosion that killed nine persons.
