= Racine College football =

Racine College
- First season: 1879
- Last season: 1887
- Location: Racine, Wisconsin
- NCAA division: Division I
- Conference: Independent
- Bowl record: 0–0 (–)

National championships
- Claimed: 0

Conference championships
- 0

Conference division championships
- 0

The Racine College football team represented Racine College in the sport of American football. Racine and the University of Michigan inaugurated college football in the Midwest with a match played on May 30, 1879. Michigan won, 1–0. The school played college football until 1887, and until 1903 as a preparatory school. "In 1903 football games were cancelled because the players were caught eating fudge, which was thought to make them poor athletes and students.'
