= Charles Cabaniss =

American football player and midshipman (1859–1882)

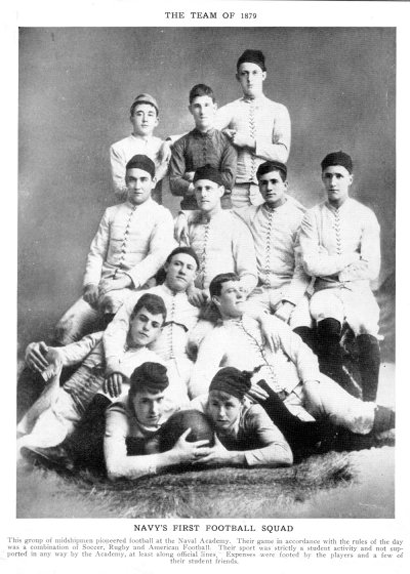
The 1879 Naval Academy football team, of which Cabaniss was a member

Charles Cabaniss (October 14, 1859 – January 19, 1882) was a midshipman in the United States Navy and early player of American football. Born and raised in Central Virginia, he was appointed to the United States Naval Academy at the age of 16. At the academy, Cabaniss retained average-level grades and was a member of the school's first-ever football team. He graduated in 1880 and was appointed to the USS Swatara. Cabaniss was killed in an accident on the Swatara in 1882 which received coverage throughout much of the Eastern United States.

== Life ==
=== At the Naval Academy ===
Cabaniss was born on October 14, 1859, in Petersburg, Virginia. He grew up in Central Virginia until he was appointed to the United States Naval Academy at the age of sixteen years and eight months. He began classes at the academy on June 21, 1876, and was the only member of his class from Virginia. Cabaniss was an average student while at the Naval Academy; he finished 40th in his class of 69 in his second year, earning near-top marks in drawing and mathematics but very low marks in history and French language. He also spent the mandatory two months and eighteen days at sea. Cabaniss had the fewest demerits of any member of his sophomore class and earned a spot on the academy's summer cruise on the USS Constellation.

Cabaniss's academic rankings remained generally the same in his following year at the academy. His scores in drawing, mathematics, and physics were above average, while his merits in French language and history were among the worst. He finished 33rd in the class of 66. He maintained his spot as the most disciplined in his class, earning fewer than half the demerits than the second-best.

Cabaniss' record for his third year at the Naval Academy (in the order: class rank, name, state, date of appointment, age in: years, months, merits in: math, physics, history, french, drawing, total demerits, sea service in: months, days)

Cabaniss finished his final year at the Naval Academy ranking 25th out of 61 graduates. The course requirements changed that year; Cabaniss received poor marks in seamanship, tactics, naval tactics, astronomy, and French language, but very high marks in mathematics, electricity, and English composition courses. He maintained his good conduct, earning the second-fewest demerits of any cadet. His rank was Cadet Midshipman.

That year, the academy fielded its first competitive football team. Although football had seen some popularity at the school, there had not been an organized effort to establish it. Two different teams were assembled in 1879; only first-classmen (final-year students) were allowed to join the teams. Cabaniss joined the second team as a rusher, the equivalent of a modern-day offensive lineman. He played alongside future admiral Hugh Rodman and eventual Governor of Guam William John Maxwell. The academy's team played one game, a scoreless tie with the nearby Baltimore Athletic Club. Navy's rushers forced the Baltimore A.C. backwards into their own end zone for safeties on three separate occasions, and generally outplayed and overpowered their opponents the entire game. (Note: At the time, there was no uniform rules structure in college football. Each team typically set up their own rules for games they hosted. Under Navy's rules in 1879, safeties did not result in points; Navy changed this by the next season.)

=== Swatara and death ===
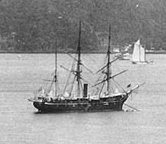
The USS Swatara, on which Cabaniss served his entire naval career

On June 10, 1880, Cabaniss graduated from the academy and was sent home to await his orders. He was assigned on August 17 of that year to the USS Swatara as a part of the Asiatic Squadron. For sixteen months, the ship was docked in Kobe, Japan, during which time Cabaniss earned himself a positive reputation with other sailors. Crew mates described him as always being happy, with an intimidating, six-foot-tall physique but a personality that did not match. His disciplined nature remained; he reportedly was one of the best-behaved sailors, who spent all of his time either carrying out his duties or practicing to be a better officer. Cabaniss was never admonished for shore misconduct, a considerable issue for most other new officers and sailors. He was reportedly a favorite of the superior officers stationed in Kobe, and was appointed to a spot on the admiral's staff as a reward for his conduct. Cabaniss was preparing for an examination for promotion early in February 1882.

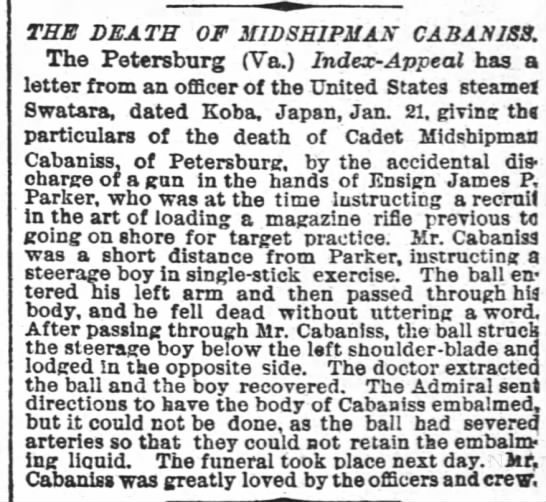
The New York Times' article about Cabaniss' death

Cabaniss was killed in an accident on board the Swatara on January 19, 1882. An official report of the incident was released on March 25 of that year. According to the report, before-noon exercises on board the ship had just been completed when an order was made to prepare rifles for target practice. At around ten in the morning, Cabaniss was assisting in the instruction of the ship's second group of sailors when he broke off and entered the ship's engine room to instruct a sailor on his duties. An experienced sailor, Ensign James P. Parker, was explaining to new sailors how to properly load their guns. He showed them how to load and discharge the weapons using a practice round. He then reloaded his gun with live rounds, but apparently forgot this and fired one of them. The bullet ricocheted off the ship's deck, struck one of the guns, ricocheted off the deck again, and struck Cabaniss, killing him instantly. The ball first entered through his left arm, impacting it so strongly that it broke every bone in his elbow. It then entered his side, tearing his latissimus dorsi muscle; went into his chest, severing every major artery; ricocheted up to near his shoulder, exited his right side, and struck the man he was instructing in the shoulder. Cabaniss was reported to have never made a sound as he fell. The other sailor recovered.

Cabaniss' body was ordered to be embalmed but was not; the damage to his body was so severe that the embalming fluid would leak out. His body was buried in Kobe on February 24 with military honors. The entire crew of the Swatara attended, as well as the entire crew of HMS Flying Fish and many noted Japanese citizens. Ensign Parker reportedly suffered from depression following the accident. Cabaniss' death received significant media coverage in the Eastern United States. The New York Times published an article on its second page, and among other papers that carried the story were the Wilmington Morning Star and the Petersburg Index-Appeal.
