= 1879 Yale Bulldogs football team =

American college football season

1879 Yale Bulldogs football
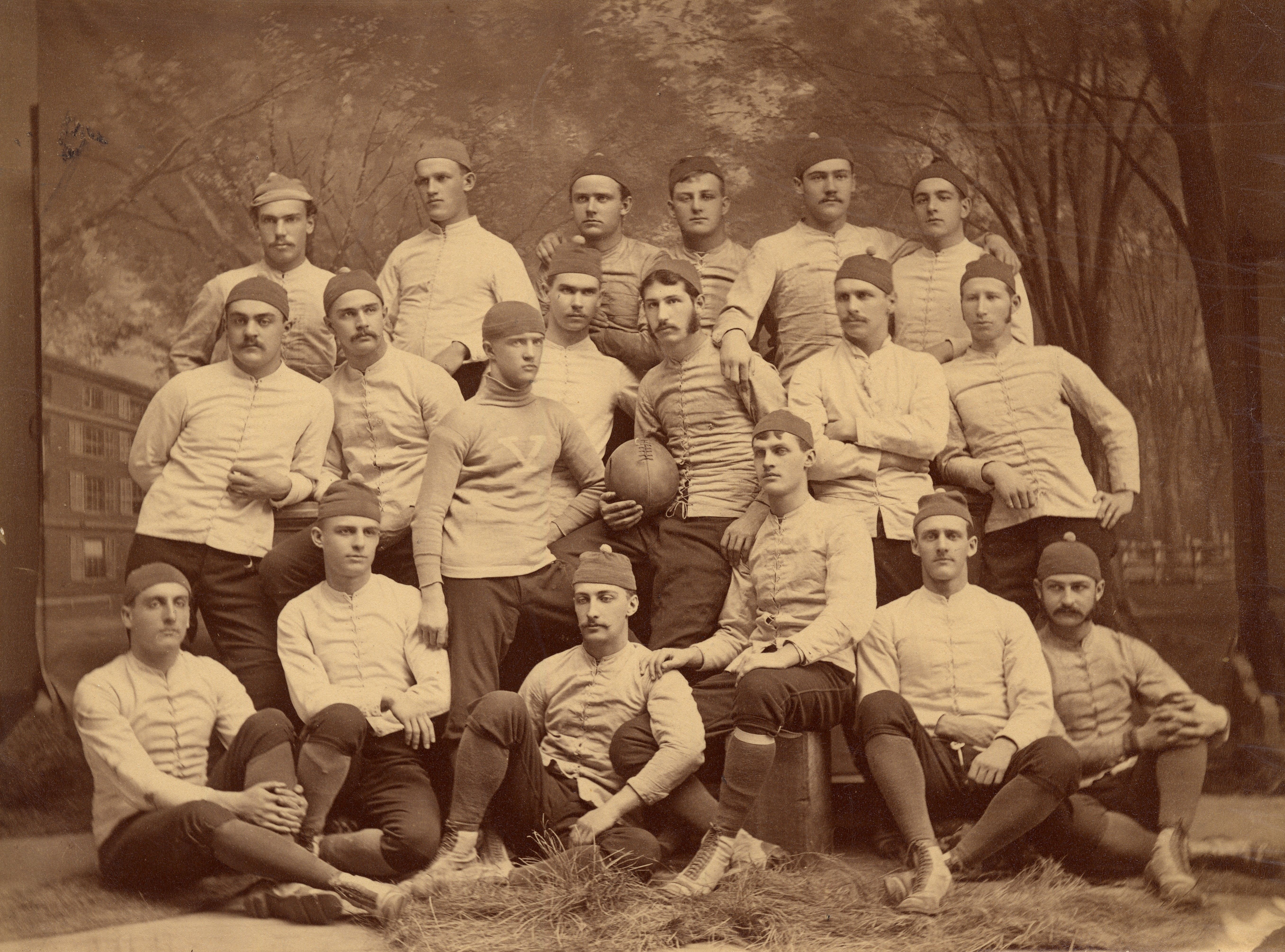

Co-national champion (Davis)
- Conference: Independent
- Record: 3–0–2
- Head coach: None
- Captain: Walter Camp
- Home stadium: Hamilton Park

1879 college football records
	Conf.			Overall
Team	W	L	T	W		L		T
Princeton		–		4	–	0	–	1
Yale		–		3	–	0	–	2
Massachusetts		–		1	–	0	–	0
Michigan		–		1	–	0	–	1
Haverford		–		1	–	0	–	1
Harvard		–		2	–	1	–	2
Penn		–		2	–	2	–	0
Amherst		–		1	–	1	–	0
Navy		–		0	–	0	–	1
McGill		–		0	–	0	–	1
Toronto		–		0	–	0	–	1
Stevens		–		1	–	2	–	5
Rutgers		–		1	–	2	–	3
Pennsylvania Military		–		0	–	1	–	1
NYU		–		0	–	2	–	1
Racine		–		0	–	1	–	0
Swarthmore		–		0	–	1	–	0
Columbia		–		0	–	3	–	2

The 1879 Yale Bulldogs football team represented Yale University in the 1879 college football season. The team finished with a 3–0–2 record and was retroactively named co-national champion by Parke H. Davis.

== Schedule ==
Date	Time	Opponent	Site	Result	Attendance	Source
November 1		vs. Penn	St. George's Cricket Club grounds; Hoboken, NJ	W 3–0		
November 8		Harvard	Hamilton Park; New Haven, CT (rivalry)	T 0–0	1,500–2,000	
November 15		Rutgers	Hamilton Park; New Haven, CT	W 5–0	300	
November 22	3:00 p.m.	vs. Columbia	St. George's Cricket Club grounds; Hoboken, NJ	W 2–0		
November 27	2:40 p.m.	vs. Princeton	St. George's Cricket Club grounds; Hoboken, NJ (rivalry)	T 0–0	6,000–7,000	

== Background ==
The prospects of the 1879 Yale team were assessed ahead of the season by a football fan from the Harvard class of 1880, Theodore Roosevelt:

"Yale has lost Thompson, who has twice turned the scale against us; but otherwise her team will probably be much the same as last year's, and there is plenty of good material with which to fill the vacancies. Captain Camp has already begun to put his men into regular training, running them in the gymnasium. Thirty men have been pledged to play against the team every afternoon...so that there will be no danger of her men suffering from lack of practice. At present it hardly seems as if the team would be as good as last year's, but their playing is improving every day, and nothing but very hard work will enable our men to win the victory. * * * Last year, we had good individual players, but they did not work together nearly as well as the Princeton team, and they were not in as good condition as the Yale men."

== Roster ==
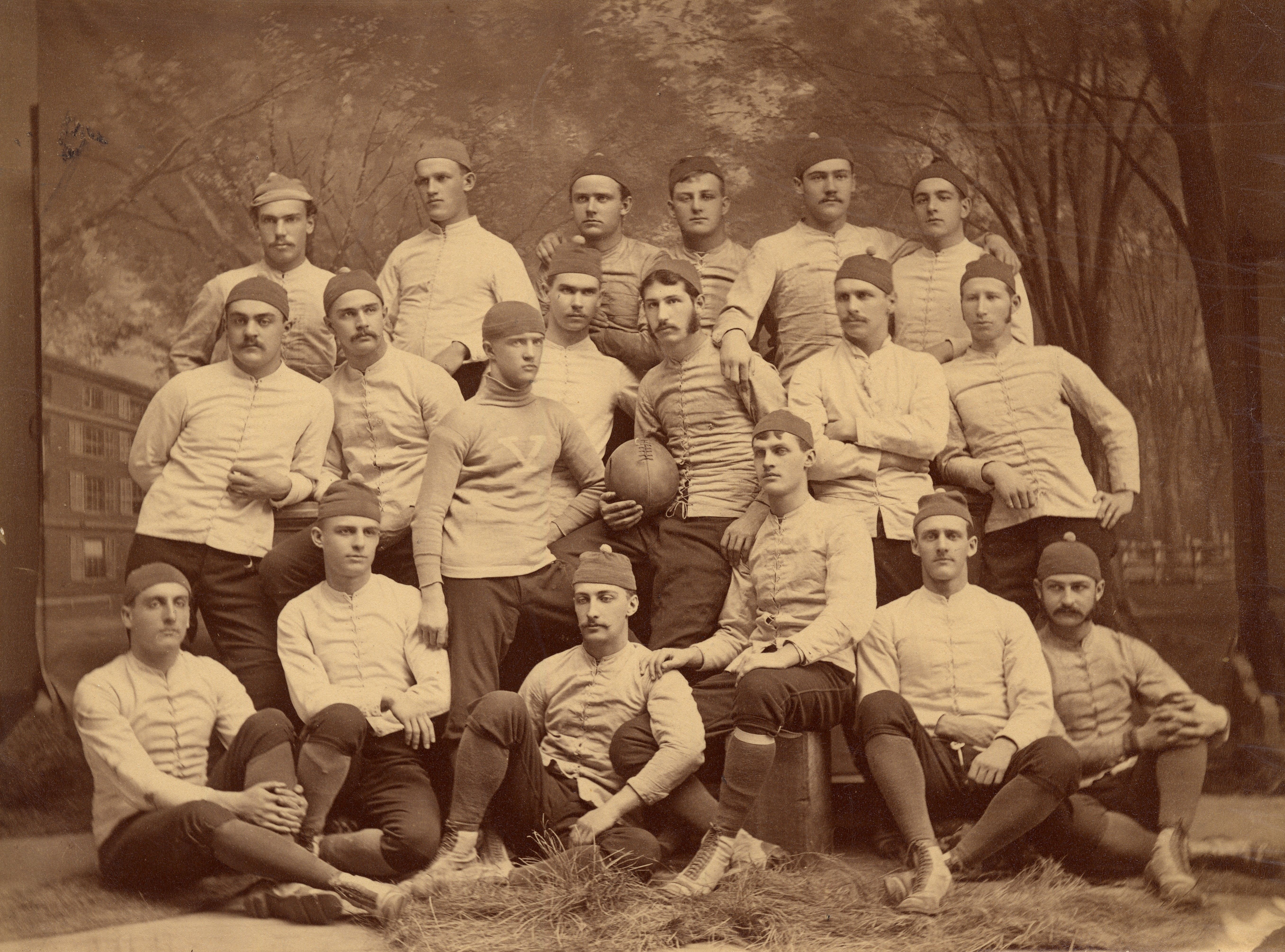
The 1879 Yale football team: team captain Walter Camp is holding the ball.

The following were members of the 1879 Yale football team.

Forwards:

- Charles S. Beck
- Franklin M. Eaton
- John S. Harding
- Louis K. Hull
- Howard H. Knapp
- Benjamin B. Lamb
- John Moorhead Jr.
- Frederic Remington

Backs:

- Walter Irving Badger
- Walter Camp — captain
- George H. Clark
- Chester W. Lyman
- William K. Nixon
- William A. Peters
- Robert W. Watson

Others:

- Benjamin Wisner Bacon
- John S. Durand
- John F. Merrill
- Charles B. Storrs
- Frederick R. Vernon

Manager:

- Eugene W. Walker
