= 1879 Columbia football team =

American college football season

1879 Columbia football
- Conference: Independent
- Record: 0–3–2
- Head coach: None
- Captain: William F. Morgan

1879 college football records
	Conf.			Overall
Team	W	L	T	W		L		T
Princeton		–		4	–	0	–	1
Yale		–		3	–	0	–	2
Massachusetts		–		1	–	0	–	0
Michigan		–		1	–	0	–	1
Haverford		–		1	–	0	–	1
Harvard		–		2	–	1	–	2
Penn		–		2	–	2	–	0
Amherst		–		1	–	1	–	0
Navy		–		0	–	0	–	1
McGill		–		0	–	0	–	1
Toronto		–		0	–	0	–	1
Stevens		–		1	–	2	–	5
Rutgers		–		1	–	2	–	3
Pennsylvania Military		–		0	–	1	–	1
NYU		–		0	–	2	–	1
Racine		–		0	–	1	–	0
Swarthmore		–		0	–	1	–	0
Columbia		–		0	–	3	–	2

The 1879 Columbia football team represented Columbia University in the 1879 college football season. The team had no head coach, and compiled a record of 0–3–2. William F. Morgan served as team captain.

== Schedule ==
Date	Time	Opponent	Site	Result	Source
October 25		at Stevens	St. George's Cricket Club grounds; Hoboken, NJ	T 0–0	
November 1		at Princeton	Princeton, NJ	L 0–2	
November 15	3:15 p.m.	at Penn	Young American Cricket Club grounds; Philadelphia, PA	L 0–1	
November 22	3:00 p.m.	vs. Yale	St. George's Cricket Club grounds; Hoboken, NJ	L 0–2	
November 27		vs. Rutgers	St. George's Cricket Club grounds; Hoboken, NJ	T 0–0	
