= 1879 Rutgers Queensmen football team =

American college football season

1879 Rutgers Queensmen football
- Conference: Independent
- Record: 1–2–3
- Head coach: None
- Captains: C. I. Haring; N. W. Voorhees
- Home stadium: College Field

1879 college football records
| | Conf. | | | Overall |
| Team | W | L | T | W | | L | | T |
|---|---|---|---|---|---|---|---|---|
| Princeton | | – | | 4 | – | 0 | – | 1 |
| Yale | | – | | 3 | – | 0 | – | 2 |
| Massachusetts | | – | | 1 | – | 0 | – | 0 |
| Michigan | | – | | 1 | – | 0 | – | 1 |
| Haverford | | – | | 1 | – | 0 | – | 1 |
| Harvard | | – | | 2 | – | 1 | – | 2 |
| Penn | | – | | 2 | – | 2 | – | 0 |
| Amherst | | – | | 1 | – | 1 | – | 0 |
| Navy | | – | | 0 | – | 0 | – | 1 |
| McGill | | – | | 0 | – | 0 | – | 1 |
| Toronto | | – | | 0 | – | 0 | – | 1 |
| Stevens | | – | | 1 | – | 2 | – | 5 |
| Rutgers | | – | | 1 | – | 2 | – | 3 |
| Pennsylvania Military | | – | | 0 | – | 1 | – | 1 |
| NYU | | – | | 0 | – | 2 | – | 1 |
| Racine | | – | | 0 | – | 1 | – | 0 |
| Swarthmore | | – | | 0 | – | 1 | – | 0 |
| Columbia | | – | | 0 | – | 3 | – | 2 |

The 1879 Rutgers Queensmen football team represented Rutgers University in the 1879 college football season. The Queensmen compiled a 1–2–3 record and were outscored by their opponents 11 to 5. The team had no coach, and its captains were N. W. Voorhees and C. I. Haring.

== Schedule ==
| Date | Opponent | Site | Result | Attendance | Source |
|---|---|---|---|---|---|
| November 11 | at Stevens | St. George's Cricket Club grounds; Hoboken, NJ | W 6–0 | | |
| November 15 | at Yale | Hamilton Park; New Haven, CT | L 0–5 | 300 | |
| November 20 | at Columbia | St. George's Cricket Club grounds; Hoboken, NJ | T 6–6 | | |
| November 23 | Stevens | New Brunswick, NJ | T 0–0 | | |
| November 26 | Stevens | New Brunswick, NJ | L 1–3 | | |
