= 1879 Navy Midshipmen football team =

American college football season

1879 Navy Midshipmen football
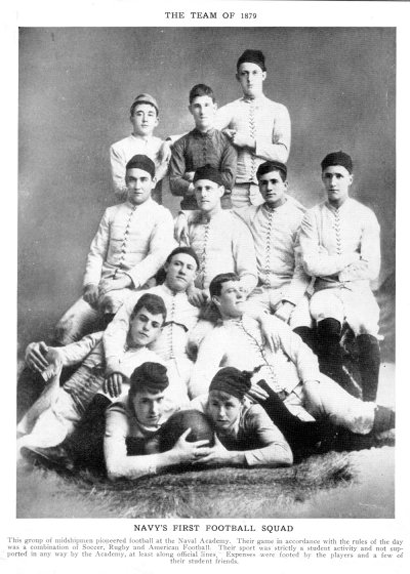
- Conference: Independent
- Record: 0–0–1
- Head coach: None
- Captain: William John Maxwell
- Home stadium: Western King Field

1879 college football records
	Conf.			Overall
Team	W	L	T	W		L		T
Princeton		–		4	–	0	–	1
Yale		–		3	–	0	–	2
Massachusetts		–		1	–	0	–	0
Michigan		–		1	–	0	–	1
Haverford		–		1	–	0	–	1
Harvard		–		2	–	1	–	2
Penn		–		2	–	2	–	0
Amherst		–		1	–	1	–	0
Navy		–		0	–	0	–	1
McGill		–		0	–	0	–	1
Toronto		–		0	–	0	–	1
Stevens		–		1	–	2	–	5
Rutgers		–		1	–	2	–	3
Pennsylvania Military		–		0	–	1	–	1
NYU		–		0	–	2	–	1
Racine		–		0	–	1	–	0
Swarthmore		–		0	–	1	–	0
Columbia		–		0	–	3	–	2

The 1879 Navy Midshipmen football team represented the United States Naval Academy in the 1879 college football season. The team was the first intercollegiate football squad to represent the United States Naval Academy. The team had no coach, as it was entirely student-operated; however, it was captained by squad member Bill Maxwell. The team played just a single game, which was a scoreless tie with the Baltimore Athletic Club. The team was entirely student operated, and was not supported by the Naval Academy's faculty. The school would not have another football squad until 1882.

== Schedule ==
Date	Opponent	Site	Result	Attendance
December 11	Baltimore Athletic Club	"superintendent's cow pasture"; Annapolis, MD	T 0–0	(Note: No records exist to provide attendance figures for the game)

== Background ==
It is widely believed by football researchers that the playing of intercollegiate football began in November 1869, when a player at Rutgers University challenged another player at the nearby College of New Jersey (now Princeton). The contest more closely resembled soccer, with teams scoring by kicking a ball into the opponent's net, and lacked a uniform rules structure. The game developed slowly; the first rules were drafted in October 1873, and only consisted of twelve guidelines. Even though the number of teams participating in the sport increased, the game was still effectively controlled by the College of New Jersey, who claimed eight national championships in ten years. Only Yale presented any form of challenge, claiming four national championships in the same time period. (Note: Multiple teams were selected as national champion in several different seasons. Between 1869 and 1879, there were only four years when one team was selected as national champion by all selectors.)

The birth of football at the Naval Academy is debated among historians. The most accepted occurrence was in 1869, when a midshipman (a student) returned from his leave with a football. While throwing the ball with a friend, it was dropped and a group of fellow midshipmen attempted to take it. A contest was eventually organized, which ended abruptly when the ball was kicked into the Severn River. However, biographer C. Douglas Kroll stated that the first evidence of a form of football at the United States Naval Academy came in 1857, but the school's cadets lost interest in the game shortly afterward, a theory supported by journalist Jack Clary. Regardless, the sport had been banned for several years prior to 1879.

== Season summary ==
There were two separate efforts to establish a Naval Academy football team in 1879. The first was guided by first-classman J.H. Robinson, who developed it as a training regiment to help keep the school's baseball team in shape. The team played the sport under rules that made it much closer to soccer, where the players were permitted only to kick the ball in order to advance it. The second effort, headed by first-classman William John Maxwell was more successful in its efforts. Maxwell met with two of his friends, Tunstall Smith and Henry Woods, who played for the Baltimore Athletic Club and officially challenged their team to a game with the Naval Academy. A team was formed from academy first-classmen, which Maxwell led as a manager, trainer, and captain. The team would wake up and practice before reveille and following drill and meals. The squad received encouragement from some of the faculty, who allowed them to eat a late dinner and skip final drill for additional practicing. This was against the direct orders of the school superintendent, who had banned football and similar activities.

The year's sole contest was played on December 11 against the Baltimore Athletic Club. The opposition's team was reportedly composed of players from Princeton, Yale, Pennsylvania, and Johns Hopkins. The Naval Academy hosted the Baltimore team on a temporary field drawn on part of the superintendent's cow pasture. Rules decided upon between the teams established that the game was to be played under rugby rules. The Baltimore American and Chronicle, which covered the contest, described it as such:

The game, played under rugby rules, was a battle from beginning to end—a regular knock down and drag out fight. Both sides became immediately excited and the audience was aroused to the highest pitch of enthusiasm by the spirited contest. The ball oscillated backward and forward over the ground without any material result.

The scrimmages were something awful to witness—living, kicking, scrambling masses of humanity surging to and fro, each individual after the leather oval. If a Baltimorean got the ball and started for a run, he was unfailingly caught by one of the brawny Cadets and dashed to earth with five or six men falling on him.

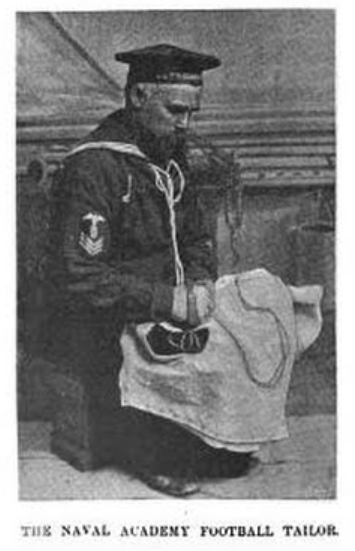
The 1879 team introduced a white canvas jacket uniform (shown being tailored, c. 1892) which is believed to be the first in college football

The game was closely fought and was finally declared a scoreless tie by the referee about an hour after it began. Navy reportedly never gained possession of the ball. However, the Naval Academy managed to keep the Baltimore Athletic Club from ever being in a scoring position. On three separate occasions, Navy forced Baltimore back into its own end zone for a safety; these were not worth any points until 1882, however, so they offered Navy no benefit. The American and Chronicle reported that Maxwell, Craven, and Sample of Navy gave the strongest performances, but were also reckless in their play and were repeatedly penalized for jumping offside or kicking the ball out of play, a form of delay of game.

Some time after the game, Walter Camp, known as the "Father of American Football", credited Maxwell as the inventor of the first football uniform. After he was informed that the Baltimore team he was playing outweighed his by an average of ten pounds, Maxwell looked for a way to make the teams more evenly matched. Using his knowledge of sailing, he decided to design a sleeveless canvas jacket which would make his players "difficult to grasp when they began to sweat". He presented the design to the academy's tailor, who created the double-lined jackets which "were laced down the front and drawn tightly to fit snugly around a player's body". The weighted suits were worn by the team, which was confused by the "strangle, heavy, newfangled getups".

== Players ==
The 1879 Naval Academy team was made up of fifteen players at four different positions. The squad consisted of ten forwards, two halfbacks, two wholebacks, and one three-quarterback. Maxwell, in addition to playing as a rusher, served as team manager and captain. John F. Luby, a first-classman, served as an unofficial assistant coach. Only first-classmen were asked to participate on the team. The age of the players, however, ranged several years due to the academy's admission policy; the school allowed for men between the ages of 14 and 18 to be admitted as first year students, which future player John B. Patton remarked made it "just a boys' school".

Rushers

- Charles Cabaniss
- MacDonough Craven
- Miles Gorgas
- Edward Leiper
- Jim Mahoney
- William "Bill" Maxwell (capt.)
- T.A. Parks
- Hugh Rodman
- Joe Rohrbacker
- Winfield Sample

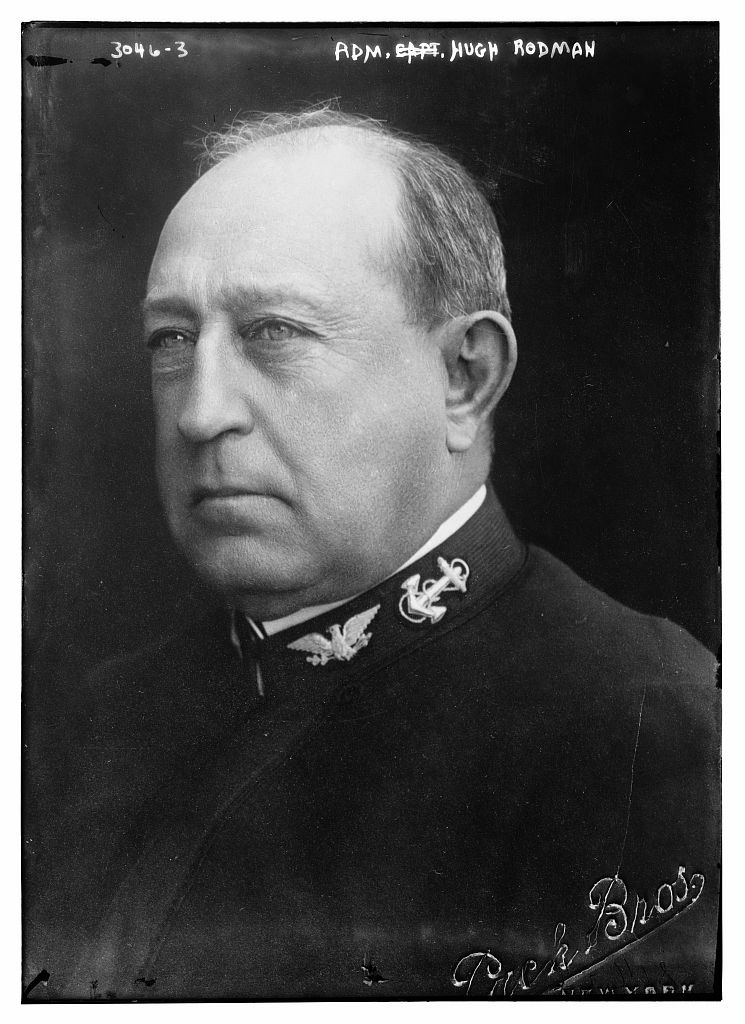
Hugh Rodman, a forward on the 1879 team, would later become the commander of the Pacific Fleet

Halfbacks

- Moody Robinson
- Bob Higgins

Wholebacks

- Tim O'Leary
- Max Orlapp

Three-quarterback

- Bill Wolfsburg

== Postseason and aftermath ==
The first postseason college football game would not be played until 1902, with the Pasadena Tournament of Roses' establishment of the east–west tournament game, later known as the Rose Bowl. The Midshipmen would not participate in their first Rose Bowl until the 1923 season, when they went 5–1–2 and tied with the Washington Huskies 14–14 in the match. According to statistics compiled by the National Championship Foundation, Parke Davis, and the Billingsley college football research center, Yale was declared the 1882 season champion, giving them their eighth overall.

The Naval Academy would not produce another football team until the 1882 season. The 1882 team would be the first with a coach, being supported by Academy officials. The 1879 season was the last time that a Navy squad would play the Baltimore Athletic Club. Navy would finish the 1880s with four winning seasons, and an overall record of 14–12–2, with one of those ties being the game against the Baltimore Athletic Club. Navy would outscore their opponents 292–231, and would finish the 19th century with an overall record of 54–19–3. The lack of a coach for the 1879 season was one of the two times the Naval Academy squad lacked one, the other time being from 1883 through 1891.
