= 1879 Harvard Crimson football team =

American college football season

1879 Harvard Crimson football
- Conference: Independent
- Record: 2–1–2
- Head coach: None
- Captain: Robert Bacon
- Home stadium: Boston Baseball Grounds

1879 college football records
	Conf.			Overall
Team	W	L	T	W		L		T
Princeton		–		4	–	0	–	1
Yale		–		3	–	0	–	2
Massachusetts		–		1	–	0	–	0
Michigan		–		1	–	0	–	1
Haverford		–		1	–	0	–	1
Harvard		–		2	–	1	–	2
Penn		–		2	–	2	–	0
Amherst		–		1	–	1	–	0
Navy		–		0	–	0	–	1
McGill		–		0	–	0	–	1
Toronto		–		0	–	0	–	1
Stevens		–		1	–	2	–	5
Rutgers		–		1	–	2	–	3
Pennsylvania Military		–		0	–	1	–	1
NYU		–		0	–	2	–	1
Racine		–		0	–	1	–	0
Swarthmore		–		0	–	1	–	0
Columbia		–		0	–	3	–	2

The 1879 Harvard Crimson football team represented Harvard University in the 1879 college football season. They finished with a 2–1–2 record. The team captain was Robert Bacon.

On November 8, Harvard and Yale played to a scoreless tie before a crowd of between 1,500 and 2,000 spectators at Hamilton Park in New Haven. Yale captain Walter Camp drop-kicked the ball through the uprights, but the goal was disallowed when the referee ruled the ball had touched a Harvard player.

On November 15, Harvard lost to Princeton before a crowd of 3,000 persons at St. George's Cricket Ground in Hoboken. Princeton scored one goal, and Harvard scored none.

== Schedule ==
Date	Time	Opponent	Site	Result	Attendance	Source
October 25	3:15 p.m.	Britannia Football Club	Boston Baseball Grounds; Boston, MA	W 2–0	600	
November 1	3:20 p.m.	at Britannia Football Club	Cricket grounds; Montreal, QC	W 1–0		
November 3		at McGill	Montreal, QC	T 0–0		
November 8		at Yale	Hamilton Park; New Haven, CT (rivalry)	T 0–0	1,500–2,000	
November 15	3:10 p.m.	vs. Princeton	St. George's Cricket Club grounds; Hoboken, NJ (rivalry)	L 0–1	3,000	
