= William Hannan (painter) =

Scottish painter

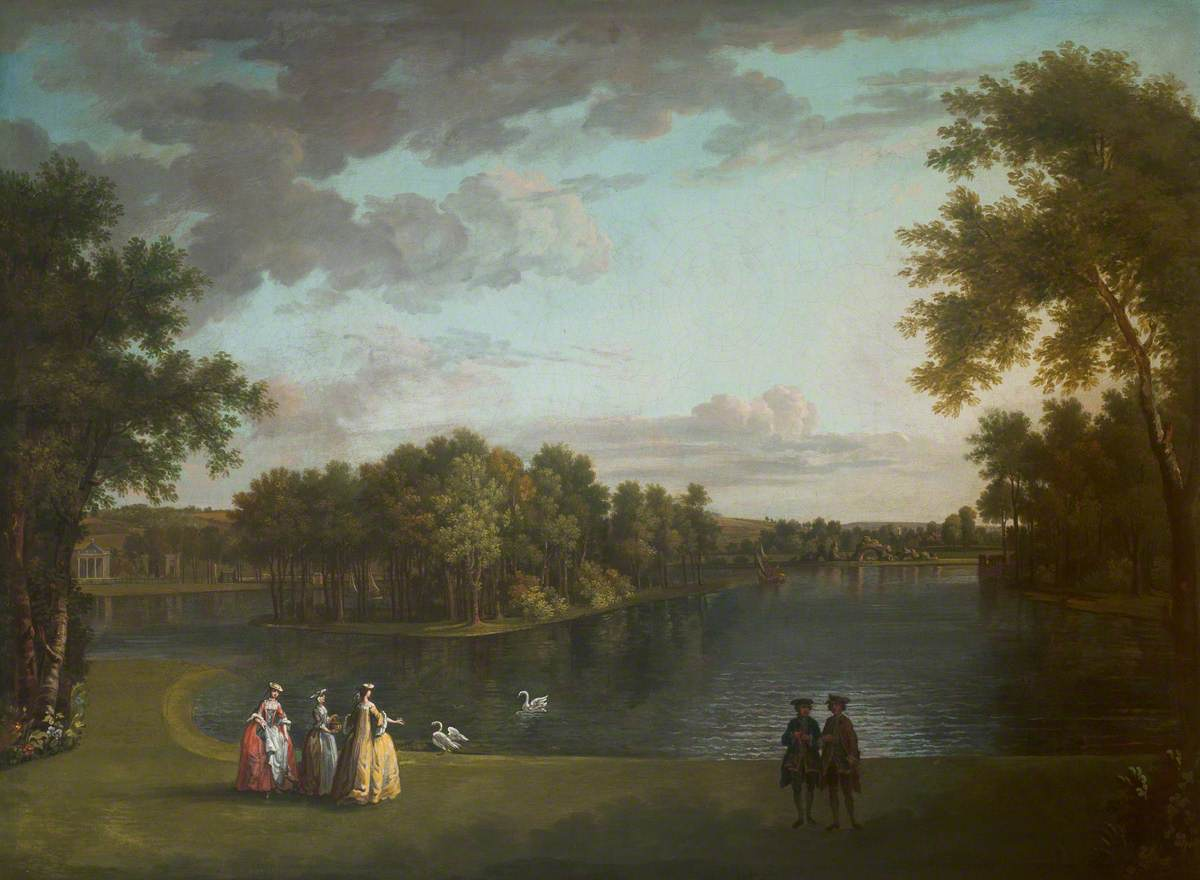
A View of the Lake at West Wycombe Park and the Temple of Daphne (c. 1750–1772)

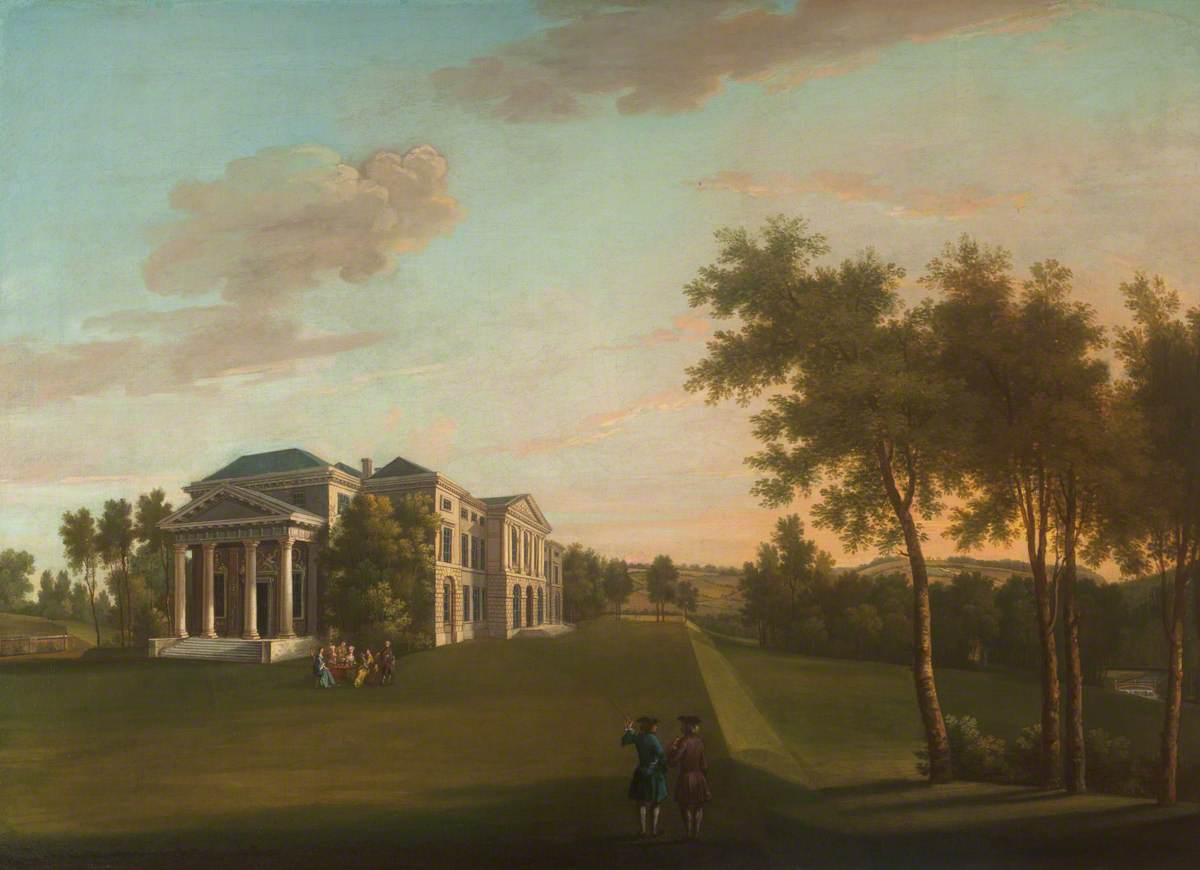
West Wycombe Park from the Terrace (c. 1745–1772)

William Hannan (1725–1772) was a Scottish drawer (artists) and decorative painter.

== Life ==
William Hannan, a native of Scotland, was born on 23 June 1725 in Kelso, Roxburghshire, and baptised there on 25 June, the son of George Hannan and Hanna Pringle. He first apprenticed to a cabinet-maker, but his master encouraged him to cultivate a talent for drawing.

He was employed by Lord le Despenser to decorate his house at West Wycombe, Buckinghamshire, where he painted several ceilings, the drawings for which were preserved in the library at Eton College.

He drew in black chalk and Indian ink four views of the gardens at West Wycombe, which were engraved by William Woollett; two of these drawings later entered the print room at the British Museum.

Hannan exhibited some drawings with the Incorporated Society of Artists from 1769 to 1772; they were mostly views in the Lakes and Cumberland.

The art critic Lionel Cust considered Hannan an excellent draughtsman.

Hannan painted "The High Street in High Wycombe, 1772", a watercolour topographical view which was subsequently engraved by S T Sparrow and published by John Howe bookseller in High Wycombe.

=== Death ===
Hannan was buried in the parish church in High Wycombe, the town in which he had died, on 29 July 1772; his wife, Mary, née Cockburn, had been buried there before him on 10 December 1771.
