= 1879 Michigan Wolverines football team =

American college football season

1879 Michigan Wolverines football
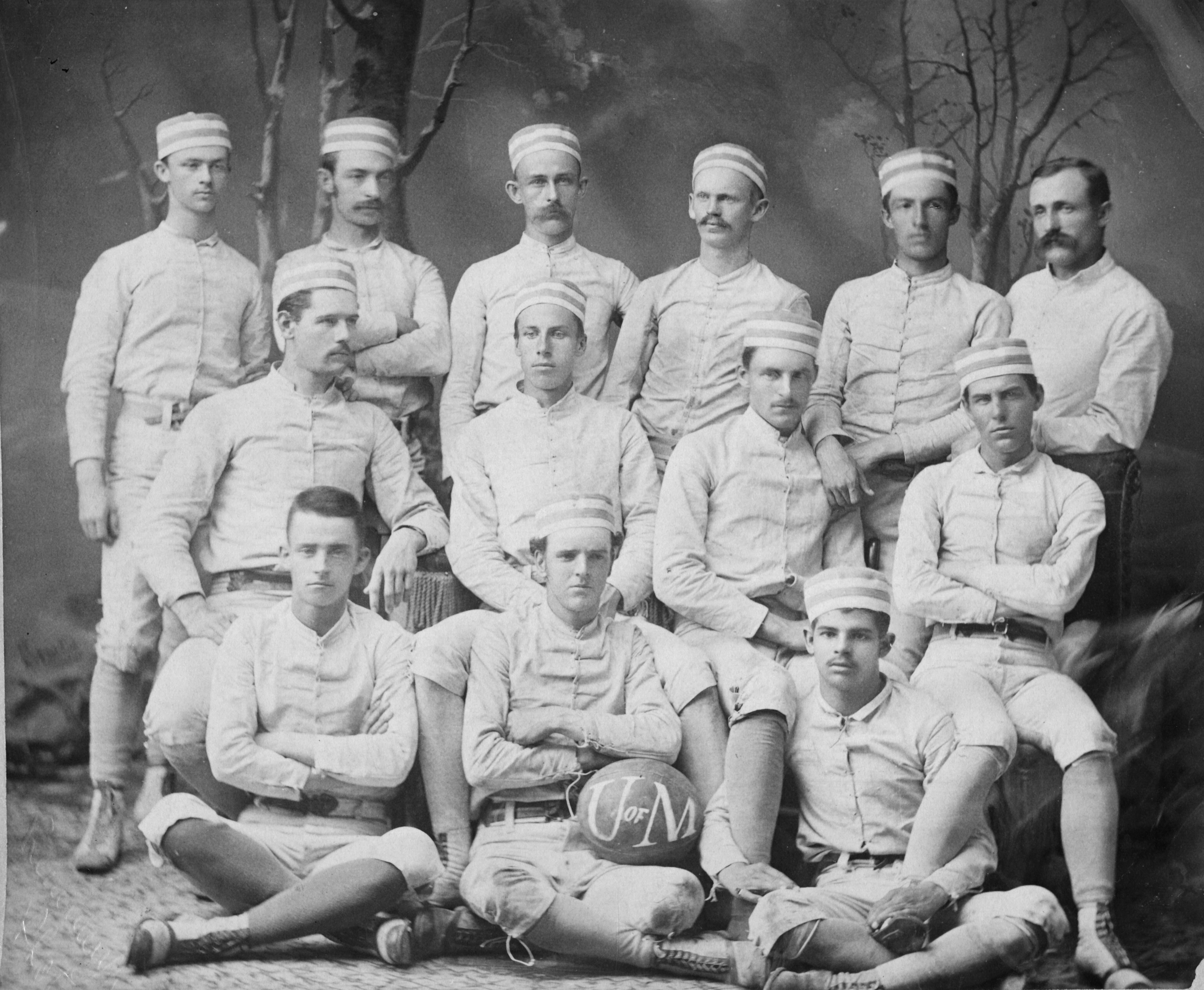
- Conference: Independent
- Record: 1–0–1
- Head coach: None
- Captain: David N. DeTar
- Home stadium: None

1879 college football records
	Conf.			Overall
Team	W	L	T	W		L		T
Princeton		–		4	–	0	–	1
Yale		–		3	–	0	–	2
Massachusetts		–		1	–	0	–	0
Michigan		–		1	–	0	–	1
Haverford		–		1	–	0	–	1
Harvard		–		2	–	1	–	2
Penn		–		2	–	2	–	0
Amherst		–		1	–	1	–	0
Navy		–		0	–	0	–	1
McGill		–		0	–	0	–	1
Toronto		–		0	–	0	–	1
Stevens		–		1	–	2	–	5
Rutgers		–		1	–	2	–	3
Pennsylvania Military		–		0	–	1	–	1
NYU		–		0	–	2	–	1
Racine		–		0	–	1	–	0
Swarthmore		–		0	–	1	–	0
Columbia		–		0	–	3	–	2

The 1879 Michigan Wolverines football team represented the University of Michigan in the 1879 college football season. The team was the first intercollegiate football squad to represent the University of Michigan. They played two games, winning one and tying the other. In its first intercollegiate football game, Michigan defeated a team from Racine College. Irving Kane Pond scored the first touchdown, and team captain David DeTar scored the first point and the first field goal.

== Schedule ==
Date	Time	Opponent	Site	Result	Attendance
May 30	4:15 p.m.	vs. Racine	White Stocking Grounds; Chicago, IL	W 1–0	500
November 1		vs. Toronto	Recreation Park; Detroit, MI	T 0–0	1,500

== Season summary ==
=== Preseason ===
The 1879 football season began with a challenge from Racine College in the fall of 1878. The Chronicle (a weekly newspaper at the University of Michigan) published the following letter dated September 30, 1878, from C. L. Cleveland of Racine College, addressed to the secretary of Michigan's Foot-ball Association:

"Dear Sir, – We have organized a foot-ball eleven of members of our college, one of the objects of which is to create an interest for athletic sports in our western colleges. We, knowing that you having [sic] a foot-ball team, are exceedingly desirous of playing you this fall. The best offer we can make is this: Chicago seems to be the most convenient place. We will see that the White Stocking grounds are procured, tend to all the advertising, and give you two-thirds of the 'gate money.' We play according to modified Rugby rules, which we will be able to send you, in printed form in about a week. Trusting that you will present this before your association, and accept our invitation – in the meantime awaiting your prompt reply – I am respectfully yours, C. L. Cleveland, Sec."

On October 21, 1878, Michigan's Foot-ball Association met to consider the challenge from Racine. The association voted to accept the challenge on condition that the game be played in the spring. The Association explained: "Inasmuch as the University possesses no eleven, and as the lateness of the season prohibits the training of one, a game this fall is out of the question." On October 26, The Chronicle expressed skepticism, noting that past plans for an inter-collegiate game had been thwarted: "Our University is then, at length to engage in an athletic contest outside its own precincts. . . . Yet we have so often intended to put similar plans into execution, which have so invariably been frustrated through some unforeseen obstacle, that we are still in doubt as to the issue." The paper also emphasized the importance of winning: "[O]ne very important point must not be overlooked. It is essential that we win the first game. . . . Defeat would put an end to all our fond expectations, while success alone can make them possible."

On April 5, 1879, The Chronicle expressed concern over the lack of work in preparing the team for its game against Racine: “The time for the long-expected and much-talked of foot-ball match with Racine is rapidly approaching and as yet little or no work has been done by our teams to prepare for it. We learn from the Racine paper that . . . the men have been at work in the gymnasium all winter. Of course, we, not having the advantage which a gymnasium affords, could not work in the winter, but now that the snow has gone, it is high time that our teams were hard at work every day. But they are not. Indeed they seem to be distinguished only by their laziness and lack of enthusiasm.”

On May 3, 1879, The Chronicle wrote that the Athletic Association had appointed committees to select the players for the university football team, to select uniforms for the team, and "to obtain subscriptions to meet the expense of sending the team to Chicago."

On May 17, 1879, The Chronicle devoted its front page to coverage of the upcoming football game in Chicago. The paper reported that a team of 22 players had been selected and had decided to practice "after supper, when the campus would be free, and it would not interfere with study." The paper continued to express concerns about the lack of rigor in the team's practice: "[T]hey have not all been on the ground at the same time since they were selected, the least sprinkle of rain, a little stiffness of the joints, a slight lack of energy, anything in short that could be twisted into an excuse seemed to be enough to keep them off the grounds. Now this will not do if the boys expect to win, if they expect even to make a respectable showing they must practice every possible moment, must put off everything else, study, amusement, girls, everything, and be promptly on hand for the nightly game. … [T]hey must work hard and faithfully else they will disgrace our University and make it anything but an honor to have been a member of the team of 1878–9."

On the Wednesday evening before the Racine game, the team appeared on campus in their new uniforms: “They presented quite a neat appearance. The uniform is of white canvas, close fitting, with blue stockings and belt.” The team left for Chicago on “the day express” on the Thursday before the game.

In his history of the Class of 1879, team member Irving Kane Pond recalled the events leading up to the Racine game as follows: "During the first semester of the year a slight ripple was caused in athletic circles by the receipt of a challenge from the Racine college eleven, to our, then not existing, University eleven. The Rugby game, then unknown to us, was to be played. The challenge was accepted, but no interest seemed to be taken in the game until late in the spring of the year, when elevens practiced evenings on the campus."

=== Vs. Racine ===
The first intercollegiate football game in Michigan history was played against the "Purple Stockings" from Racine College on May 30, 1879, at the Chicago White Stockings' grounds in Lakefront Park (now part of Grant Park). The Michigan team stayed at the Clifton House and was taken to the playing field by bus at 3:15 p.m. The game was played in front of a crowd of 500 spectators, amid heat described as "oppressive," and began at 4:15 p.m. The Chicago Daily Tribune called it "the first rugby-football game to be played west of the Alleghenies." The Chronicle (a weekly newspaper at the University of Michigan) called it "the finest game of Rugby foot-ball every played this side of the Alleghenies."

The game was played in two innings of 45 minutes. (The periods of play were referred to as "innings" in 1879.) Irving Kane Pond (who later became an architect) scored the first touchdown in Michigan football history midway through the first inning. According to Will Perry's history of Michigan football, the crowd responded to Pond's plays with cheers of "Pond Forever." No points were scored for a touchdown, with a point being scored from touchdown only if the kick for goal after the touchdown succeeded. After Pond's touchdown, Michigan's team captain, David DeTarr, attempted the kick for goal. The Michigan players and umpire opined that the kick was good, but the referee ruled it had missed. The first inning ended at 4:55 p.m. with no points having been scored. Play was resumed after a ten-minute rest period.

In the second inning, Michigan scored the only point of the game on a place-kick by DeTarr after a catch by John Chase. The Chronicle wrote that the teams "fought like dogs of war" in the second inning, with the play of Chase leading to the yell of "Chase is there" repeated "at least twenty times." In its account of the game, the Racine Advocate wrote that the Purple Stockings "had the worst of it, the ball constantly near their goal." The Chicago Daily Tribune also described the game as one-sided in Michigan's favor: "From first to last the Racine boys were on the defensive." The Racine newspaper credited Michigan's passing and teamwork as the difference in the game: "Perfect harmony characterized the Michigan boys' playing, when one of them caught the ball he instantly passed it to a colleague nearer the enemy's goal and they were only discomfited when they practiced Racine's attempt to run with the ball dodging others." The Chicago Daily Tribune concluded its game coverage with an injury report: "No bones were broken, but [Racine's] Torbert was stretched out on the turf. A bucket of water however revived him."

During the game, telegrams were sent from Chicago to Ann Arbor with updates on the game. A boy was hired to deliver the updates by "velocipede" from the telegraph office to the campus. The updates were then posted on a blackboard near the medical building, where a number of students gathered. When the final update was posted ("6:28 p.m.: Game finished, won by Michigan, – one goal – kicked by DeTarr"), the gathering of students "manifested their feelings in the usual student manner."

Michigan's lineup against Racine consisted of David DeTarr, John Chase, Irving Kane Pond, Jack A. Green, William W. Hannan, Frank F. Reed, Richard Guy DePuy, and Thomas R. Edwards (rushers), Charles H. Campbell, and Edmond H. Barmore (halfbacks) and Charles S. Mitchell (goal-keeper). The referee was Mr. Van Dyke of Milwaukee, a former Princeton football player.

After the game, the team attended an alumni banquet at the Palmer House.

=== Vs. Toronto ===
Michigan's second intercollegiate football game was played in Detroit against the University of Toronto on November 1, 1879. A large number of students arrived from Ann Arbor on the Friday before the game, and a number of Canadian "excursionists" were also in the city. Another group of 250 students arrived in Detroit on the Saturday morning train from Ann Arbor and walked to Recreation Park to watch the game. Shortly after the crowd arrived from Ann Arbor, word was received that Zachariah Chandler, the former mayor of Detroit, U.S. Senator from Michigan, Secretary of the Interior, and U.S. Presidential candidate, had died. Flags in the city were lowered to half mast, and the Detroit Free Press noted that an absurd report spread that the demonstration by the Michigan students "had some reference to that sad event."

The game was scheduled to start at 2:00 p.m., but the players did not arrive on time. Attendance was reported at 500–600 persons by the Detroit Free Press, though University of Michigan records place the figure at 1,500. Given the novelty of the game in Detroit, the Free Press devoted much of its coverage to educating readers on the rules and methods of play. The paper described it as football "of the scientific kind in vogue in all universities and throughout England and her provinces, and known the world over as 'Rugby.'" The paper noted that the field was 300 feet wide and 400 feet long. At both sides stood two 12-foot high posts about 20 feet apart. White lines were drawn in plaster to mark the boundaries of the field. A string was drawn from one post to the other eight feet from the ground, and "the point of the game was to get the ball over the string or goal." The game was declared a draw after the teams played two hard-fought, 45-minute innings without either team scoring. The Free Press called it "One of The Most Exciting Sporting Events Ever Seen at Recreation Park" and credited the efforts of both teams: "This was the result of Saturday's match and at its close both teams were awarded rounds of cheers. The playing on both sides was marked by perfect courtesy and the honors of the game were evenly divided."

Michigan's lineup against Toronto was David DeTarr (captain), Frank Gates Allen, Thomas R. Edwards, William W. Hannan, Richard Guy DePuy, Collins H. Johnston, Jack A. Green, John Chase, Edmond Barmore, Frank Reed and Charles S. Mitchell. Captain Rogers of the Yale Foot Ball Club served as referee. W. Axford was the umpire for Michigan, and J. H. Campbell was the umpire for Toronto.

== Players ==
=== Starting lineup against Racine ===
The following players were the first Michigan football team that played against Racine in May 1879:

- Edmond H. Barmore, Jeffersonville, Indiana – halfback; starter against Racine and Toronto
- Charles H. Campbell, Detroit, Michigan – halfback; starter against Racine
- John Chase, Ann Arbor, MI – rusher (with the ball); starter against Racine and Toronto
- Richard Guy DePuy, Jamestown, North Dakota – rusher (with the ball); starter against Racine and Toronto
- David Noble DeTarr, Boone, Iowa – rusher (with the ball); starter against Racine and Toronto
- Thomas R. Edwards, Ann Arbor, MI – left side; starter against Racine and Toronto
- Jack A. Green, Austin, Texas – right side; starter against Racine and Toronto
- William W. Hannan, Dowagiac, Michigan – right side; starter against Racine and Toronto
- Charles S. Mitchell, Alexandria, Minnesota – goal-keeper; starter against Racine and Toronto
- Irving Kane Pond, Ann Arbor, MI – rusher (with the ball); starter against Racine
- Frank Reed, Ann Arbor, MI – left side; starter against Racine and Toronto

=== Others ===
- Frank Gates Allen, Aurora, Illinois – forward; starter against Toronto
- William B. Calvert, Ann Arbor, Michigan – substitute
- Collins H. Johnston, Grand Rapids, Michigan – halfback on the first eleven but unable to accompany the team to Chicago; starter against Toronto
- Albert Samuel Pettit, Ann Arbor, MI – listed as "extra man" for the game against Racine

== See also ==
- List of the first college football game in each US state
