= Racine College =

Defunct Episcopal school in Racine, Wisconsin, U.S.

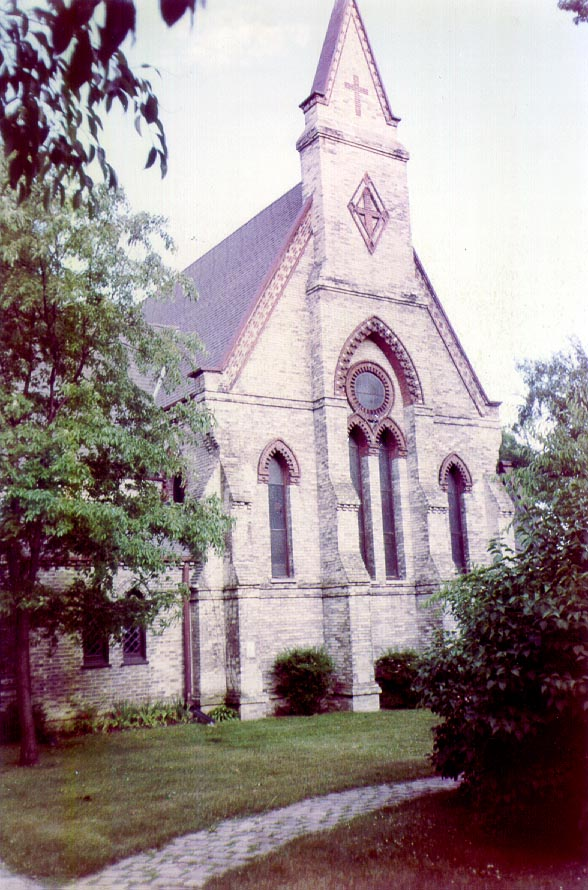
- St. John's Chapel in 1996
- Motto: Vigeat radix
- Motto in English: "May the root thrive"
- Type: Private
- Active: 1852–1933
- Founder: Bishop Jackson Kemper
- Religious affiliation: Episcopal Church
- Location: Racine, Wisconsin, United States; 42.706111°N 87.786111°W
- Racine College
- U.S. National Register of Historic Places
- Location within Wisconsin Location within the United States
- Location: 600 21st St., Racine, Wisconsin
- Area: 40 acres (16 ha)
- Built: 1852
- Architect: Lucas Bradley
- Architectural style: Gothic
- NRHP reference No.: 76000076
- Added to NRHP: December 12, 1876

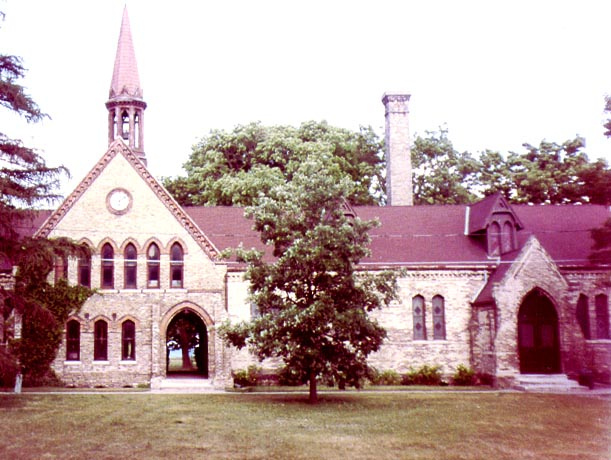
Racine College East Building showing tunnel heading east toward Lake Michigan

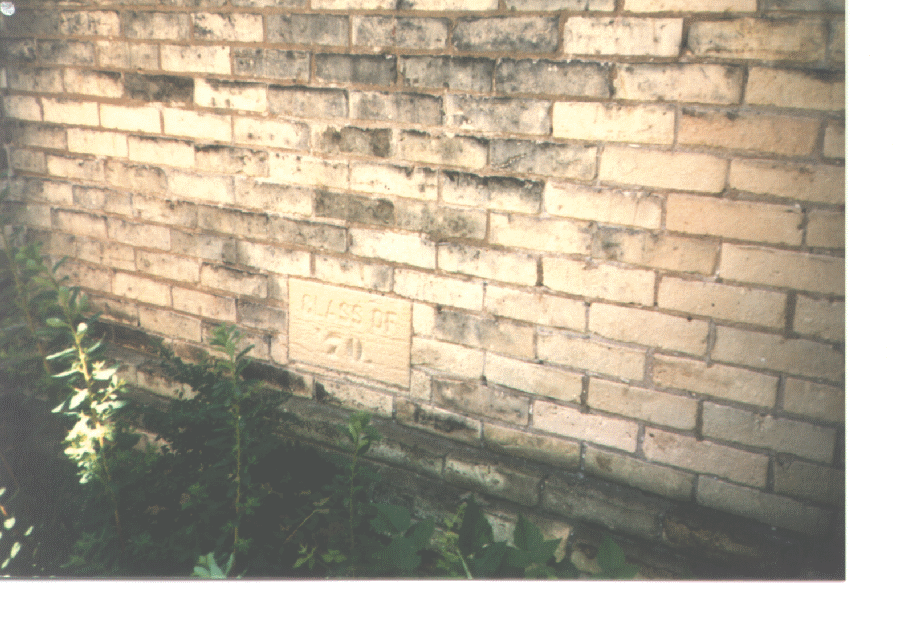
Class of 1870 stone in Racine College's chapel wall.

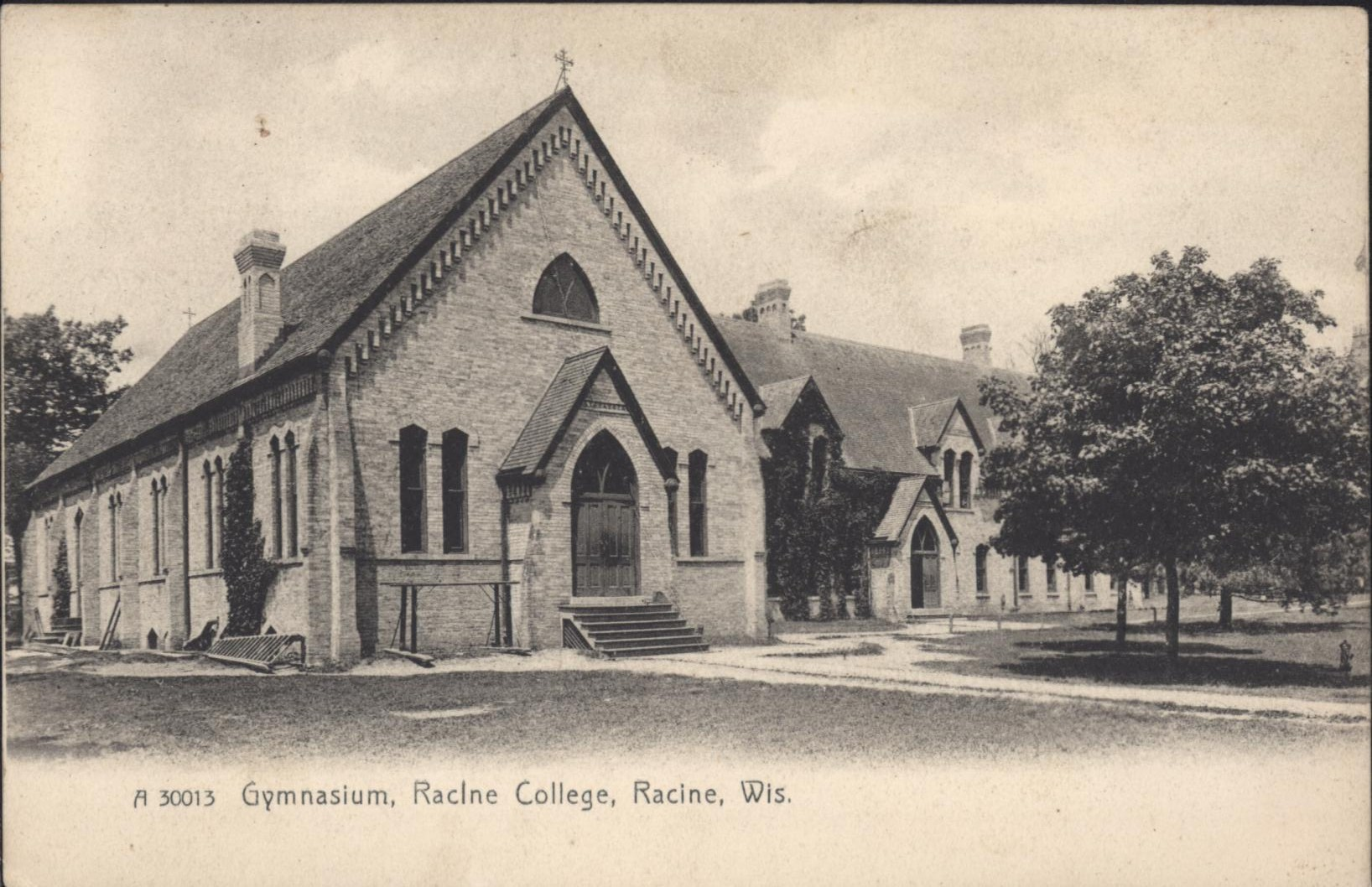
Gymnasium of Racine College

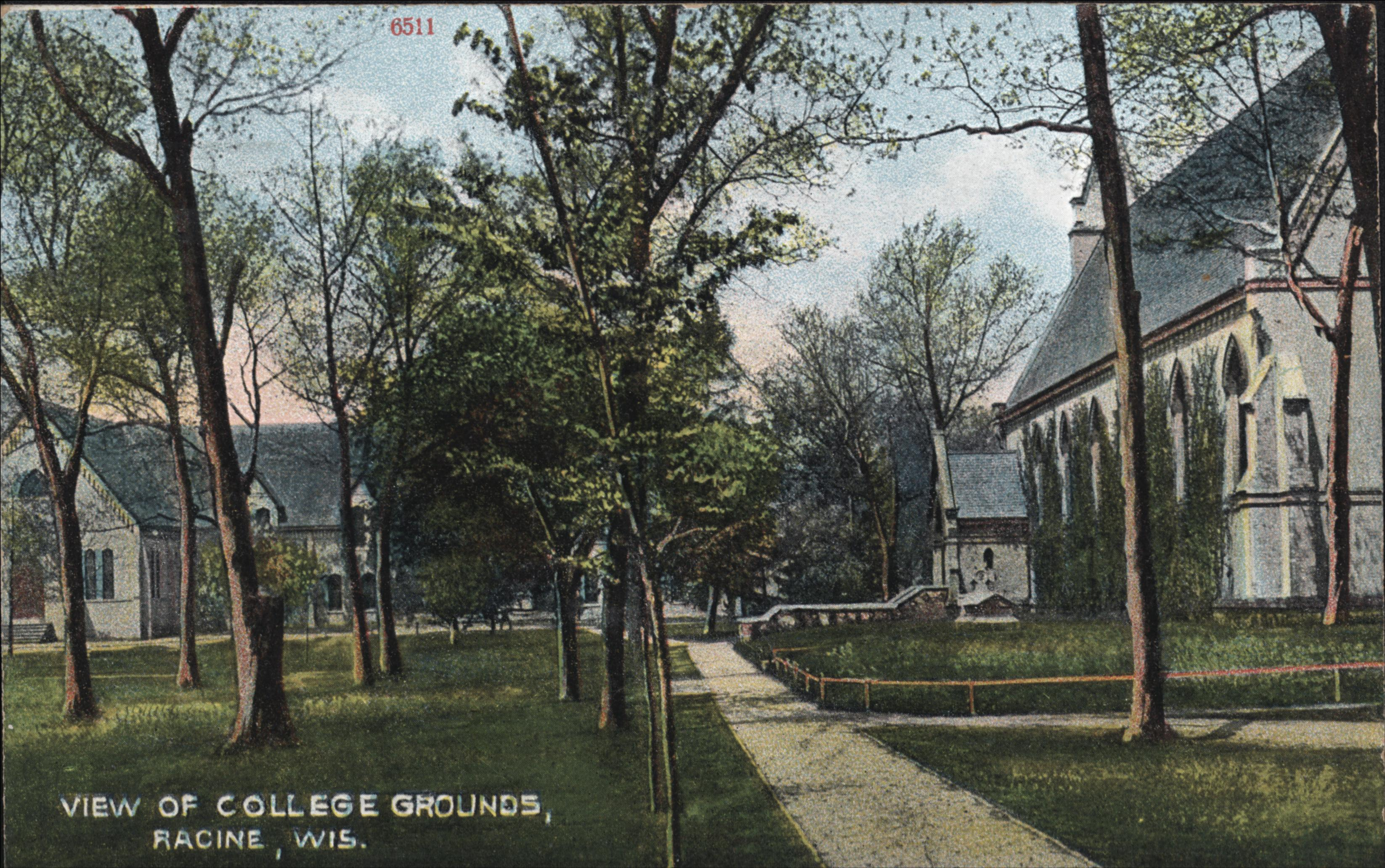
View of the grounds of Racine College in 1910, facing west, toward the gymnasium. Chapel is on the right.

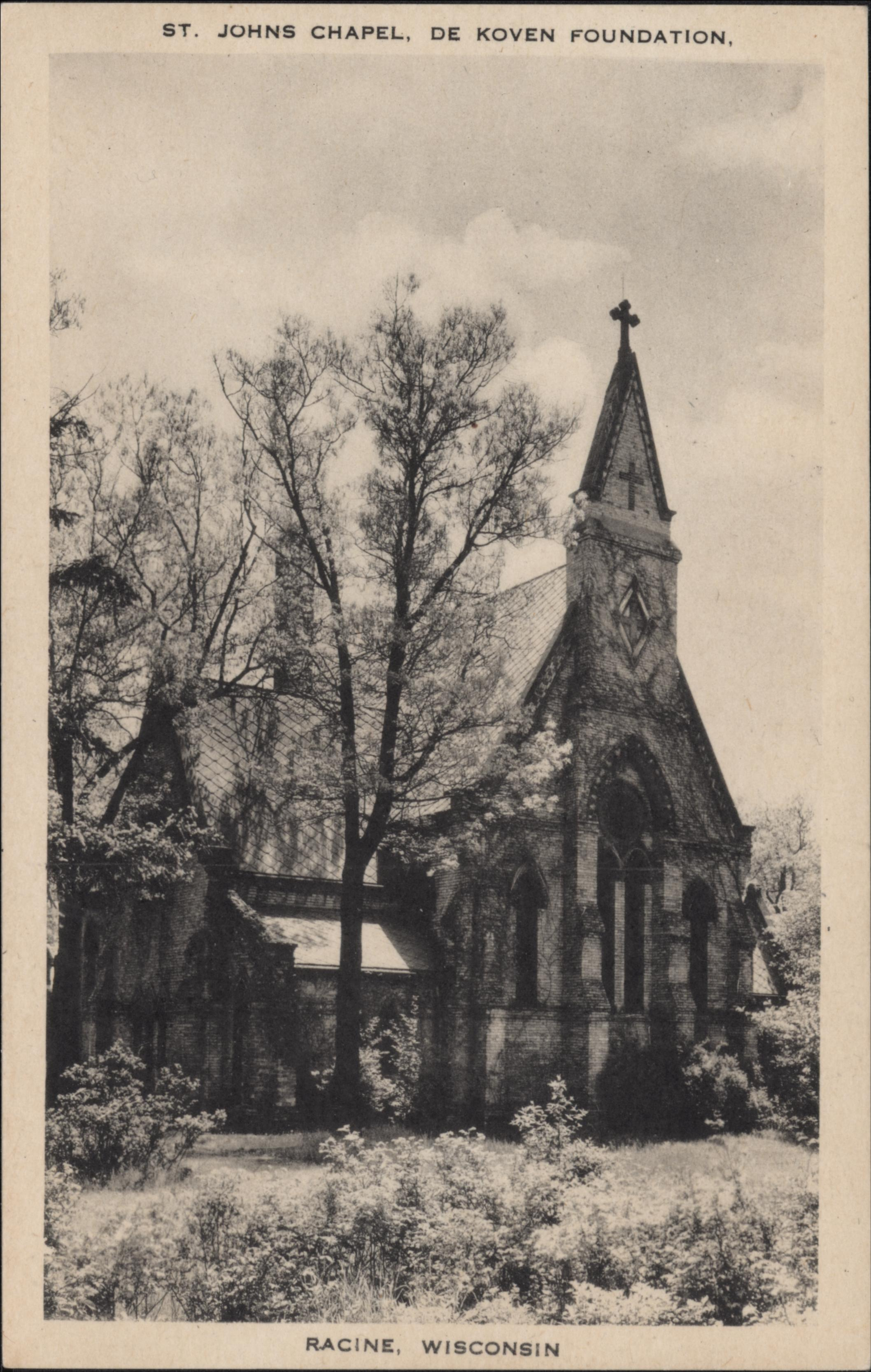
St. John's Chapel at Racine College, in Racine, Wisconsin, ca. 1910

Racine College was an Episcopal preparatory school and college in Racine, Wisconsin, that operated between 1852 and 1933. Located south of the city along Lake Michigan, the campus has been maintained and is today known as the DeKoven Center, a conference center, educational facility, and special events venue operated by the DeKoven Foundation.

The historic buildings that make up the traditional cloistered quadrangle campus are among the few collegiate neo-Gothic buildings that survive in the Midwest. Despite their location, they are considered part of the East Coast College architectural tradition. In part because of its limited use, the campus has remained relatively intact since its construction, which took place between 1852 and 1876. Much of the campus was constructed by Lucas Bradley, a renowned Racine architect, who designed it in accordance with plans by J.F. Miller of New York. Like many historic buildings in southeastern Wisconsin, the Racine College structures are largely composed of Cream City brick.

== History ==
=== Early years (1852-1859) ===
Racine College was first conceived at an Episcopal Church conference held in Milwaukee in 1851. Bishop Jackson Kemper, who headed the meeting, became the founder of the college even before a site had been laid out for it. Prominent citizens of Racine, including Marshall Strong and Dr. Elias Smith, successfully lobbied to have the college built in their city and raised funds for a rural six-acre site on a bluff overlooking the lake. The state legislature granted the institution a charter on March 3, 1852. The first classes began in May of that year, which were held in a rented room in the city because the college was still under construction. Construction of the first college building, Park Hall, was not finished until September 1853.

The first major expansion to the college came in 1857, when a second building was deemed necessary. Lucas Bradley, one of Racine's most prominent architects, was chosen to design the building, which he chose to make "a twin to the first". This building, Kemper Hall, was completed in the autumn of 1859. During the same year, the national economy was suffering the end of the Panic of 1857, and Racine began to be affected. This depression encouraged Racine to merge with St. John's Hall, a small theological institution in Delafield. The school there closed and its faculty moved to Racine, including its rector, James DeKoven, who became warden of Racine College thereafter.

=== DeKoven era (1859-1879) ===
DeKoven became Racine College's most notable warden. He was a major exponent of High Church and Anglo-Catholic views in the Episcopal Church, and was one of the best-known preachers and orators of his day. DeKoven's work at Racine was directly influenced by the Grammar School and College of Saint James in Maryland, which in turn was part of the "church school" movement inaugurated by William Augustus Muhlenberg and his proteges in 1828. When DeKoven began to raise money for new buildings at Racine College, he looked to England for his inspiration. Most of the campus buildings were inspired by the architecture of St. Peter's College, a high-church public school founded at Radley in 1847.

Most of Park Hall was destroyed by fire on January 15, 1864, and almost all of the sizable library of former president Roswell Park was lost. Thanks to donations by the people of Racine, a replacement building was constructed within the year. The college was also able to begin construction on a third building, St. John's Chapel, within the same year. Two years later, Emeline Taylor, the widow of former Racine College trustee Isaac Taylor, died and bequeathed $65,000 to the institution. This sum allowed for the construction of the campus' fourth and largest building, which was named Taylor Hall. The building would later be equipped with a bell tower at the cost of nearly $2,000.

When the American Civil War drove Saint James out of business, several important teachers and professors joined DeKoven at Racine. Racine College was sometimes called "the Sewanee of the North", since both were Oxonian church-operated institutions. The grammar school and college at Sewanee, Tennessee were closely linked to Racine in the postbellum era; the Chancellor of the University of the South, Bishop Charles Todd Quintard, served on the Racine Board of Trustees, and an early leader of Sewanee, Thomas F. Gailor, was prepared at Racine.

As a result of this further expansion, the college continued to build new facilities. A dining hall was constructed in 1871 and an assembly hall followed the next year. These buildings were placed between the two halls, connecting them and creating what would also be known as the East Building. A fire on February 4, 1875, destroyed much of the interior of Taylor Hall, although the outlying structure remained intact. Because of this, the building was able to be restored for less than half the cost of the original construction, although collegiate education was forced to be canceled for several weeks and did not fully return to its prior state for over a year afterward. 1875 also saw the construction of yet another new building, which housed both a gymnasium and a chemistry laboratory.

With the encouragement of DeKoven, a collection of nine Episcopal bishops held a meeting in 1876 where they declared Racine College "A Church University for the West and Northwest", and collectively wrote that it was "the only church college proper in actual operation between Kenyon College, in Ohio, and the Pacific Ocean." They agreed to support the college's mission by helping it open grammar schools across the Midwest that carried on its educational philosophy.

Racine College was one of the first schools to have a college football team. They were known as the Racine Purple Stockings, after the Chicago White Stockings, on whose field they played. Racine and the University of Michigan Wolverines played the Midwest's first intramural college football game on May 30, 1879. Michigan won, 1–0. The team continued to play in the NCAA for the next ten years, and frequently played against teams such as Harvard, Yale, Princeton, Northwestern, and Wisconsin.

=== Decline as a college (1879-1889) ===
DeKoven died suddenly on March 19, 1879, after serving as Racine's warden for two decades. His funeral was held there three days later, and when the Episcopal Church declared him a saint, March 22 became his feast day. He is buried on campus, just outside the wall of St. John's Chapel. His work in theology and education was compared to that of John Keble, and like him, DeKoven's grave was considered a shrine by Anglicans.

After DeKoven's death, the standing of the college began to decline. As a result, the school's endowment shrank quickly, which led to a further decline in the quality of education. The collegiate department at Racine was forced to close in 1889, just ten years after the height of its success and influence. In closing the college, its trustees explained that with its lowered funding, it could no longer maintain a high educational standard. The name "Racine College" was retained despite the closure.

=== Preparatory school and later years (1889-1933) ===
Following the closure of the collegiate department, the grammar school remained and became a preparatory school. A military school also occupied the site, and the institution as a whole was advertised as a "school for manly boys". During this time, most boys enrolled at Racine College were secondary (or grammar) school students preparing for the Bachelor of Arts course. The campus continued to be a major location for the Episcopal Church, which held a number of conferences there in the early 20th century. Enrollment fell drastically during World War I, leading to the college's closure in 1918.

The campus was vacant for a few years, before it reopened as the Racine Academy in 1923. After resolving the college's debts, which were in excess of $100,000, the Academy opened its doors on October 1, 1923. Chicago business interests funded much of the repayment. Originally, there was no military school at the Academy, but that branch reopened in 1930. With the addition of a junior college in 1932, it officially returned to the Racine College name, but this revival was short-lived. The depths of the Great Depression had a delayed effect on the college, but it gradually began to suffer. On August 8, 1933, the college's closure was officially announced, and the last students left the campus shortly after.

=== Influence ===
The teaching at Racine College, especially DeKoven, had a wider influence on education in the United States. Teachers and professors trained by DeKoven brought great expertise and passion to other college preparatory schools and to colleges and universities. Sidney T. Smythe, the founder of St. John's Military Academy in Delafield, was prepared at Racine and remained a devotee of DeKoven's. To this end, he reopened St. John's Hall, where DeKoven formerly taught, to house his academy.

=== Closure and recent history (1933-present) ===
The Episcopal Diocese of Milwaukee lost ownership of the grounds after the school's closure, but Bishop Benjamin Ivins was able to arrange a summer camp at the property, run by the Community of St. Mary, in 1934. Another summer camp was held the following year, and this was successful enough that the Community of St. Mary bought the property just before a sheriff's sale was to be held that fall. In December, the sisters created the DeKoven Foundation for Church Work to manage the campus, and organize "retreats, conferences, and church activities," as well as continue to host a yearly summer camp for girls. The DeKoven Center was sold back to the Diocese of Milwaukee in 1985, which continues to operate it under an independent 501c3 corporation, the DeKoven Foundation.

The campus became home to the Racine Montessori School, Racine's first school offering Montessori education, in September 1963. Originally opened in a single room in the East Building and educating only 32 students, the school continually grew to rent a larger space and enroll over two hundred. The Case Corporation donated the nearby former Lakeside School building, which had closed in 1979, to Racine Montessori, allowing the school to move out of DeKoven in 1996.

The Spectrum School of the Arts and Community Gallery opened in the East Building in 1980. A summer school for children and year-round school for adults, Spectrum offers supplemental art classes to people of all ages. In addition to fine art shows, the Spectrum Gallery, opened in 1996, still holds regular classes and exhibitions of students' artwork.

A controversial development plan, proposed in 1995, would have converted the college buildings into apartments, as well as constructing new apartment buildings within the site. This plan was rejected by the DeKoven Foundation and a coalition of local residents.

The DeKoven Natatorium, a community swimming pool located in the gymnasium, closed on March 1, 2013, after 100 years of operation. The cost of maintaining the pool grew too high for the DeKoven Foundation to afford. The pool had been added to the gym building in 1913, one of the few architectural additions since the death of DeKoven, and had previously closed in 1979 because of structural problems. After a renovation effort, it had reopened in 1991.

The DeKoven Center holds a variety of regional and national/international events in addition to serving as a community event space. in the past, one of the largest annual events, that took place in St. John's Chapel and the Great Hall, was the madrigal feast put on by the choir and theater departments of Horlick High School.

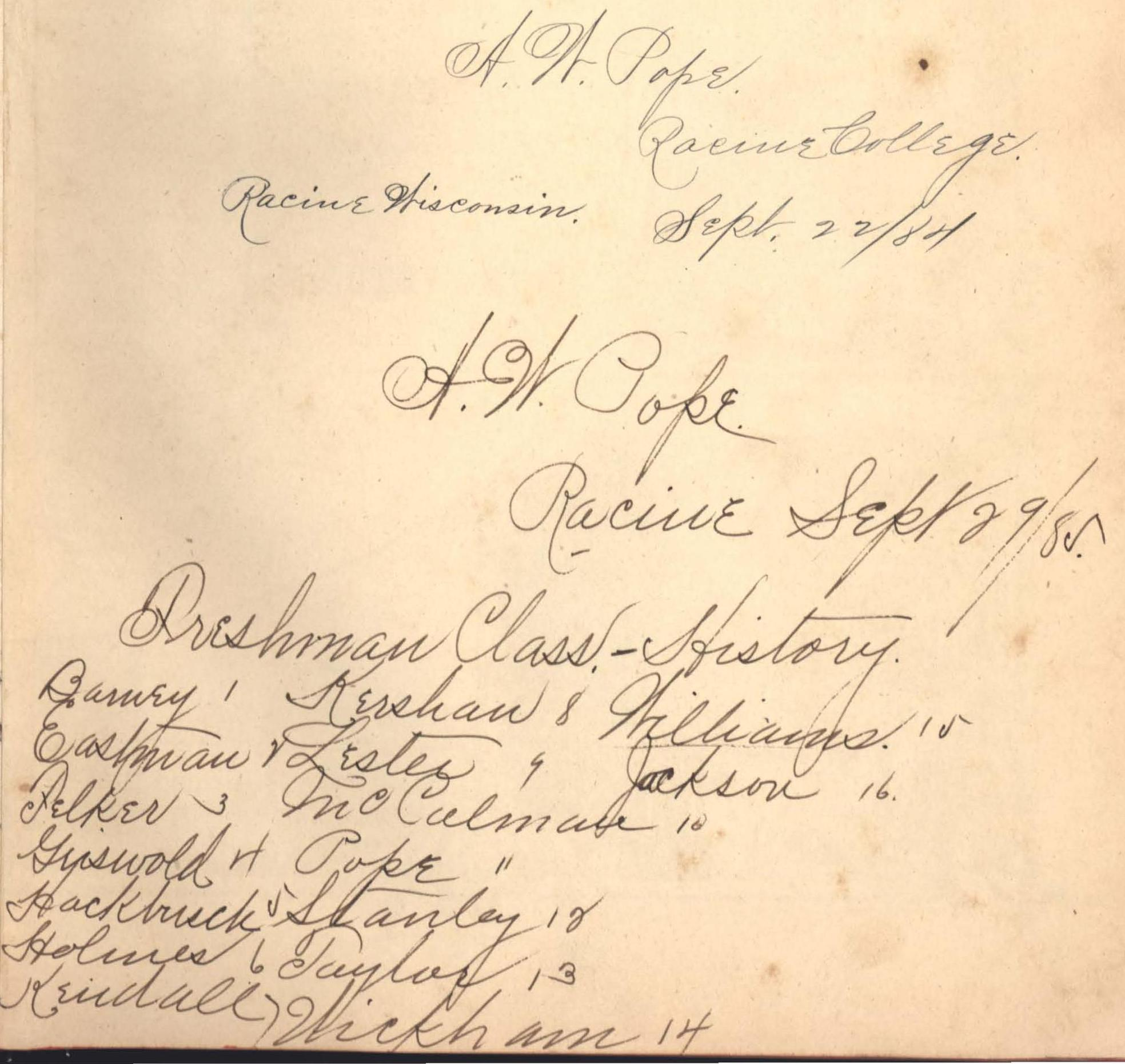
Students of the Freshman Class - History on September 29, 1885 from inside an atlas used by student named “H. W. Pope”

== Notable alumni ==
- Gen. Mark W. Clark
- Bishop Robert Harper Clarkson
- Joseph Doe, U.S. Assistant Secretary of War
- Bishop Samuel Cook Edsall
- James H. Elmore, Mayor of Green Bay, Wisconsin, 1890 to 1895
- Norton J. Field, Wisconsin State Assemblyman
- Francis Joseph Hall, theologian
- Alexander James Horlick (1873-1950), vice president of Horlick's Malted Milk Company, mayor of Racine, son of William Horlick
- Ernest de Koven Leffingwell, explorer and geologist
- Tad Lincoln, son of President Abraham Lincoln
- Brig. Gen. Billy Mitchell
- Henry Harrison Oberly, clergyman and author
- James C. Reynolds, Wisconsin State Assemblyman and Senator
- Wallace Rice, author and designer of the Chicago flag
- Earl Winfield Spencer Jr., U. S. Naval Commander and first husband of the Duchess of Windsor
- Maj. Gen. Eben Swift
- Maj. Gen. Charles A. Willoughby
- John B. Winslow, 10th Chief Justice of the Wisconsin Supreme Court

== See also ==
- National Register of Historic Places listings in Racine County, Wisconsin
