= Pasadena Apartments =

- U.S. National Register of Historic Places
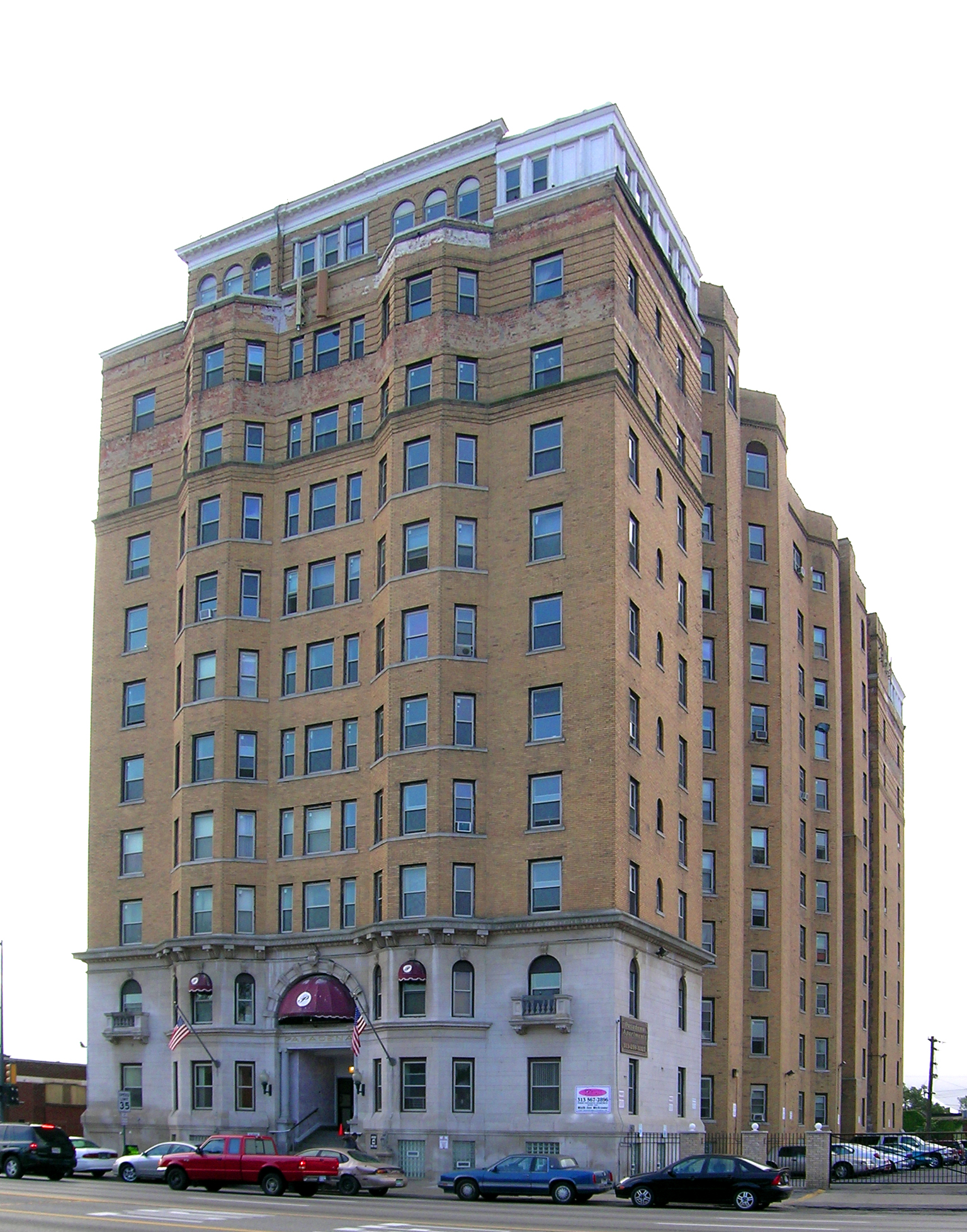
- Interactive map
- Location: 2170 East Jefferson Avenue; Detroit, Michigan
- Coordinates: 42°20′12″N 83°1′34″W
- Built: 1902; 124 years ago
- Architect: Mortimer L. Smith & Sons
- Architectural style: Renaissance Revival
- MPS: East Jefferson Avenue Residential TR
- NRHP reference No.: 85002944
- Added to NRHP: October 09, 1985

The Pasadena Apartments is an apartment building located at 2170 East Jefferson Avenue in Detroit, Michigan. It was listed on the National Register of Historic Places in 1985.

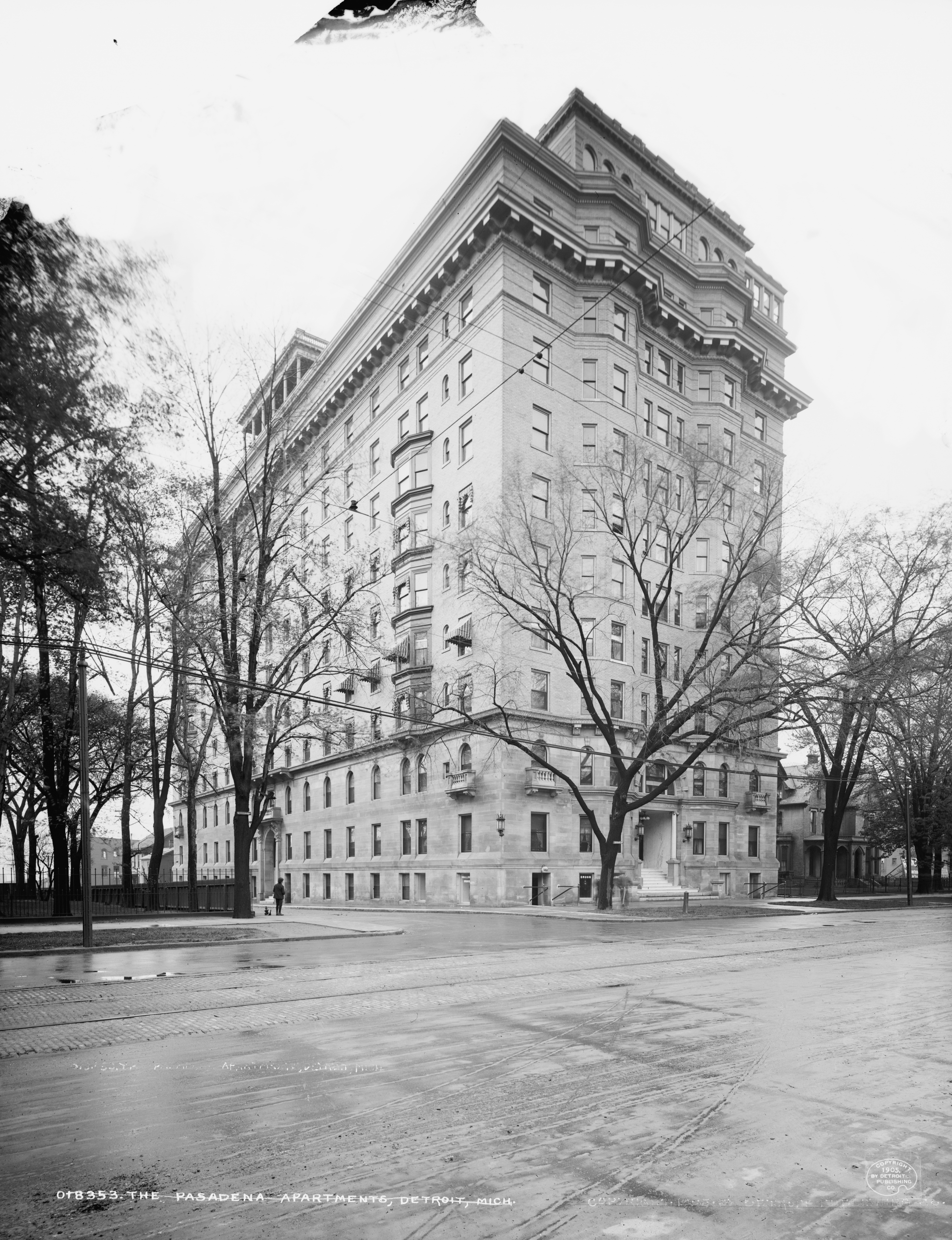
Pasadena Apartments, c. 1905

== Description ==
The Pasadena Apartment Building is an eleven-story building constructed of yellow brick with limestone facing on the two lower floors. A column of bay windows rises from the basement to the tenth floor; a classic style entrance is in the center of the front façade. The building originally had classical details on the upper floors, including a cornice and false balconies, that have been removed.

== Historical significance ==
The Pasadena Apartments was constructed in 1902 from a design by Mortimer L. Smith. The building is an early example of upper-class, multi-unit housing, and is one of the earliest of these structures to be built with reinforced concrete. The building was constructed at a time when newly wealthy families associated with Detroit's industrial boom were appearing, yet financing requirements for private homes were substantial.

The building is still used as apartment space, and is operated by MFG Detroit.
