= 1882 Michigan Wolverines football team =

American college football season

1882 Michigan Wolverines football
- Conference: Independent
- Record: 0–0
- Head coach: None
- Captain: William J. Olcott
- Home stadium: None

1882 college football records
	Conf.			Overall
Team	W	L	T	W		L		T
Yale		–		8	–	0	–	0
Colorado College		–		1	–	0	–	0
Navy		–		1	–	0	–	0
Richmond		–		1	–	0	–	0
Harvard		–		7	–	1	–	0
Fordham		–		7	–	1	–	0
Princeton		–		7	–	2	–	0
Wesleyan		–		3	–	1	–	0
Rutgers		–		6	–	4	–	0
Columbian University		–		0	–	0	–	1
Dartmouth		–		1	–	1	–	0
Lake Forest		–		1	–	1	–	0
Minnesota		–		1	–	1	–	0
Northwestern		–		1	–	1	–	0
Stevens		–		1	–	1	–	1
Amherst		–		2	–	3	–	0
Penn		–		2	–	4	–	0
CCNY		–		1	–	2	–	0
MIT		–		1	–	4	–	0
Randolph–Macon		–		0	–	1	–	0
Clifton AC		–		0	–	1	–	0
Lafayette		–		0	–	2	–	0
McGill		–		0	–	2	–	0
NYU		–		0	–	2	–	0
Massachusetts		–		0	–	3	–	0
Columbia		–		0	–	5	–	0

The 1882 Michigan Wolverines football team represented the University of Michigan in the 1882 college football season. The team played no outside games. The captain of the 1882 team was William J. Olcott.

== Players ==
=== Varsity letter winners ===
- Elmer Beach, quarterback, Atwood, Michigan
- Harry Bitner, rusher, Mt. Carroll, Illinois
- Hugh P. Borden, rusher, New Carlisle, Indiana
- Henry Brock, rusher, Holly, Michigan
- John Couch, rusher, Pittsburgh, Pennsylvania
- Richard G. DePuy, halfback, Jamestown, North Dakota
- Richard Millard Dott, halfback, Sioux City, Iowa
- Thomas H. Gilmore, goalkeeper, Chicago, Illinois
- William Harrison Mace, rusher
- William J. Olcott, three-quarter back, Ishpeming, Michigan
- Horace Prettyman, rusher, Bryan, Ohio

=== Others ===
- William J. Duff, Oswego, New York
- Robert Campbell Gemmel, Salt Lake City, Utah
