= List of Richmond Spiders head football coaches =

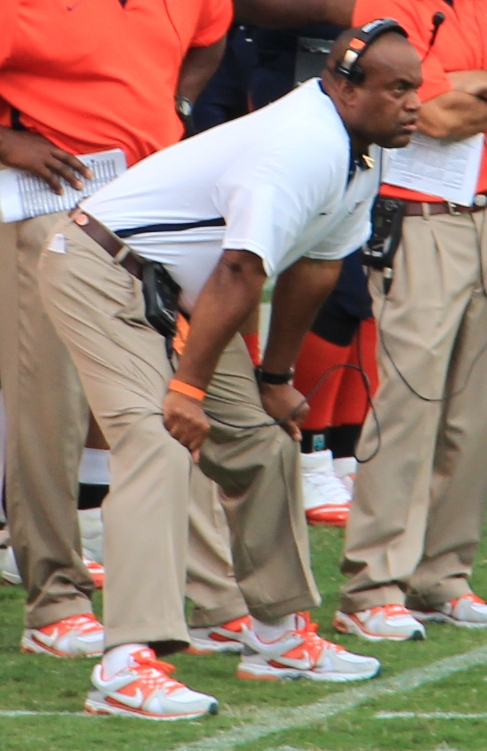
Mike London led the Spiders to their lone national championship as head coach in 2008.

The Richmond Spiders college football team represents the University of Richmond in the Coastal Athletic Association Football Conference (CAAFC), as part of the NCAA Division I Football Championship Subdivision. The program has had 36 head coaches and one interim head coach since it began play during the 1881 season. Since December 2016, Russ Huesman has served as head coach at Richmond.

Seven coaches have led Richmond in postseason playoff or bowl games: Frank Jones, Dal Shealy, Jim Reid, Dave Clawson, Mike London, Danny Rocco, and Huesman. Eleven coaches have won conference championships: Fred Vail won one and Frank Dobson won three as a member of the Eastern Virginia Intercollegiate Athletic Association; Dobson won two and Glenn Thistlethwaite won one as a member of the Virginia Conference; Jones won three and Jim Tait won one as a member of the Southern Conference; Shealy won one as a member of the Yankee Conference; Reid won two and Clawson won one as a member of the Atlantic 10 Conference; Clawson and London each won one and Rocco won two as a member of the Colonial Athletic Association; and Huesman won one as a member of the CAAFC. London also won an NCAA Division I Football Championship in 2008.

Dobson is the leader in seasons coached, with 20 years as head coach and in games coached (175) and won (79). M. C. Taylor has the highest winning percentage of those who have coached more than one game at 1.000. C. T. Taylor has the lowest winning percentage of those who have coached more than one game, with 0.000.

== Key ==
Key to symbols in coaches list
General		Overall		Conference		Postseason (Note: Although the first Rose Bowl Game was played in 1902, it has been continuously played since the 1916 game, and is recognized as the oldest bowl game by the NCAA. "—" indicates any season prior to 1916 when postseason games were not played.)	
No.	Order of coaches (Note: A running total of the number of head coaches, with coaches who served separate tenures being counted only once. Interim head coaches are represented with "Int" and are not counted in the running total. "—" indicates the team played but either without a coach or no coach is on record. "X" indicates an interim year without play.)	GC	Games coached	CW	Conference wins	PW	Postseason wins
DC	Division championships	OW	Overall wins	CL	Conference losses	PL	Postseason losses
CC	Conference championships	OL	Overall losses	CT	Conference ties	PT	Postseason ties
NC	National championships	OT	Overall ties (Note: Overtime rules in college football were introduced in 1996, making ties impossible in the period since.)	C%	Conference winning percentage		
†	Elected to the College Football Hall of Fame	O%	Overall winning percentage (Note: When computing the win–loss percentage, a tie counts as half a win and half a loss.)				

== Coaches ==
List of head football coaches showing season(s) coached, overall records, conference records, postseason records, championships and selected awards (Note: Statistics correct as of the end of the 2025 NCAA Division I FCS football season.)
No.	Name	Season(s) (Note: Richmond did not field a team for their 1883, 1884, and 1896 seasons.)	GC	OW	OL	OT	O%	CW	CL	CT	C%	PW	PL	PT	DC	CC	NC	Awards
1	M. C. Taylor	1881	2	2	0	0	1.000	—	—	—	—	—	—	—	—	—	0	—
2	C. M. Hazen	1882; 1885–1886; 1888	8	4	4	0	0.500	—	—	—	—	—	—	—	—	—	0	—
3	H. R. Hundley	1887	2	1	1	0	0.500	—	—	—	—	—	—	—	—	—	0	—
4	Frank Johnson	1889	3	1	2	0	0.333	—	—	—	—	—	—	—	—	—	0	—
5	C. T. Taylor	1890	3	0	3	0	.000	—	—	—	—	—	—	—	—	—	0	—
6	Dana Rucker	1891; 1893–1895	19	3	13	3	0.237	—	—	—	—	—	—	—	—	—	0	—
7	Penwick Shelton	1892	5	2	3	0	0.400	—	—	—	—	—	—	—	—	—	0	—
8	Bill Wertenbaker	1897	8	3	5	0	0.375	—	—	—	—	—	—	—	—	—	0	—
9	Oscar Lee Owens	1898	7	3	3	1	0.500	—	—	—	—	—	—	—	—	—	0	—
10	Julien Hill	1899	4	2	2	0	0.500	—	—	—	—	—	—	—	—	—	0	—
11	Ed Kenna	1900	7	3	4	0	0.429	—	—	—	—	—	—	—	—	—	0	—
12	Garnett Nelson	1901	8	1	7	0	0.125	—	—	—	—	—	—	—	—	—	0	—
13	Graham Hobson	1902	6	3	3	0	0.500	—	—	—	—	—	—	—	—	—	0	—
14	Fred Vail	1903	10	6	3	1	0.650	3	0	0	1.000	—	—	—	—	1	0	—
15	Harry Wall	1904	6	1	5	0	0.167	0	2	0	.000	—	—	—	—	0	0	—
16	E. A. Dunlap	1905–1909; 1912	57	19	33	5	0.377	11	12	2	0.480	—	—	—	—	0	0	—
17	E. V. Long	1910	8	1	6	1	0.188	0	3	0	.000	—	—	—	—	0	0	—
18	Sam Honaker	1911	8	0	6	2	0.125	0	3	0	.000	—	—	—	—	0	0	—
19	Frank Dobson	1913–1917; 1919–1933	175	79	78	18	0.503	17	12	7	0.569	—	—	—	—	5	0	—
20	Robert C. Marshall	1918	5	3	1	1	0.700	1	0	0	1.000	—	—	—	—	0	0	—
21	Glenn Thistlethwaite	1934–1941	76	41	26	9	0.599	15	19	3	0.446	—	—	—	—	1	0	—
22	John Fenlon	1942; 1946–1947	30	12	15	3	0.450	5	12	2	0.316	—	—	—	—	0	0	—
23	Malcolm Pitt	1943–1944	15	8	7	0	0.533	1	5	0	0.167	—	—	—	—	0	0	—
24	George Hope	1945	8	2	6	0	0.250	0	4	0	.000	—	—	—	—	0	0	—
25	Karl Esleeck	1948–1950	30	10	18	2	0.367	6	17	1	0.271	—	—	—	—	0	0	—
26	Ed Merrick	1951–1965	146	53	87	6	0.384	33	52	5	0.394	—	—	—	—	0	0	—
27	Frank Jones	1966–1973	82	44	38	0	0.537	36	13	0	0.735	1	1	0	—	3	0	—
28	Jim Tait	1974–1979	65	21	44	0	0.323	8	4	0	0.667	0	0	0	—	1	0	—
29	Dal Shealy	1980–1988	100	43	57	0	0.430	11	11	0	0.500	1	2	0	—	1	0	—
30	Jim Marshall	1989–1994	66	19	47	0	0.288	12	36	0	0.250	0	0	0	0	0	0	—
31	Jim Reid	1995–2003	102	48	53	1	0.475	35	40	0	0.467	1	2	0	2	2	0	Yankee Coach of Year (1995); A-10 Coach of Year (1998, 2000)
32	Dave Clawson	2004–2007	49	29	20	—	0.592	18	14	—	0.563	3	2	—	2	2	0	I-AA.org National Coach of the Year (2005)
33	Mike London	2008–2009	29	24	5	—	0.828	13	3	—	0.813	5	1	—	1	1	1 – 2008	AFCA FCS Coach of the Year (2008); BCA National Coach of the Year (2008)
34	Latrell Scott	2010	11	6	5	—	0.545	4	4	—	0.500	0	0	—	—	0	0	—
Int	Wayne Lineburg (Note: After Latrell Scott resigned just priar to the start of the season, Lineburg served as interim head coach for the 2011 season.)	2011	11	3	8	—	0.273	0	8	—	.000	0	0	—	—	0	0	—
35	Danny Rocco	2012–2016	65	43	22	—	0.662	26	14	—	0.650	5	3	—	—	2	0	CAA Coach of the Year (2015)
36	Russ Huesman	2017–present	100	59	41	—	0.590	41	26	—	0.612	2	3	—	—	2	0	—
