= 1894 Crescent Athletic Club football team =

American college football season

1894 Crescent Athletic Club football
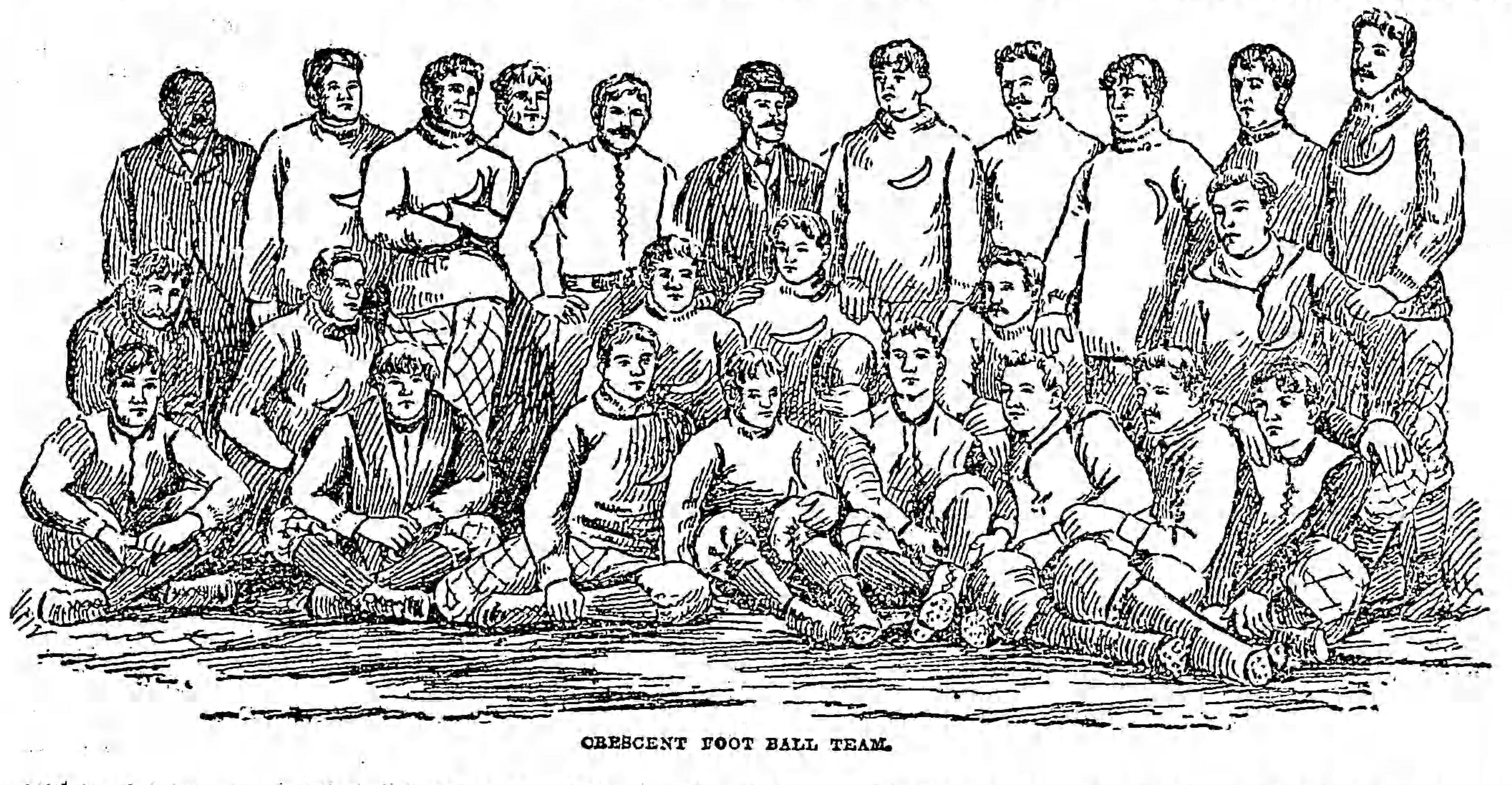
- 1894 Crescent Athletic Club football team
- Conference: American Football Union
- Record: 2–7 ( AFU)
- Head coach: Harry Beecher
- Captain: George B. Pratt
- Home stadium: Eastern Park

The 1894 Crescent Athletic Club football team was an American football team that represented the Crescent Athletic Club in the American Football Union (AFU) during the 1894 college football season. The team played its home games at Eastern Park in Brooklyn and compiled a 2–7 record. Harry Beecher was the official coach of the team, assisted by Duncan Edwards, Wyllys Terry, William H. Ford, and William Bull. George B. Pratt, formerly of Amherst College, was the team captain.

== Schedule ==
| Date | Time | Opponent | Site | Result | Attendance | Source |
|---|---|---|---|---|---|---|
| October 6 | | at Yale* | Eastern Park; Brooklyn, NY | L 0–10 | 3,000 | |
| October 10 | | at Penn* | Philadelphia, PA | L 0–22 | 1,500 | |
| October 13 | | Stevens* | Eastern Park; Brooklyn, NY | W 34–0 | | |
| October 20 | | Penn | Eastern Park; Brooklyn, NY | L 10–18 | | |
| October 27 | | Rutgers | Eastern Park; Brooklyn, NY | W 20–4 | | |
| November 3 | 3:30 p.m. | Amherst | Eastern Park; Brooklyn, NY | L 0–6 | | |
| November 6 | | Cornell | Eastern Park; Brooklyn, NY | L 0–22 | 3,000 | |
| November 10 | | Boston Athletic Association | Eastern Park; Brooklyn, NY | L 0–22 | | |
| November 17 | | Orange Athletic Club | Orange Oval; East Orange, NJ | L L 8-16 | | |
*Non-conference game
