= Massachusetts Aggies football, 1879–1889 =

American college football seasons

The Massachusetts Aggies football team (later known as the UMass Minutemen) represented Massachusetts Agricultural College (now known as the University of Massachusetts Amherst) in American football. The team played its home games at Alumni Field in Amherst, Massachusetts.

Highlights of the school's first 11 years of intercollegiate football include the following:

- On November 22, 1879, the Aggies played and won their first game, defeating Amherst, 4–0.
- On November 10, 1880, the Aggies sustained their first loss, falling to Williston Seminary by a 10–8 score.

== 1879 ==
1879 Massachusetts Aggies football
- Conference: Independent
- Record: 1–0
- Head coach: None
- Captain: Fred P. Taylor
- Home stadium: Alumni Field

1879 college football records
	Conf.			Overall
Team	W	L	T	W		L		T
Princeton		–		4	–	0	–	1
Yale		–		3	–	0	–	2
Massachusetts		–		1	–	0	–	0
Michigan		–		1	–	0	–	1
Haverford		–		1	–	0	–	1
Harvard		–		2	–	1	–	2
Penn		–		2	–	2	–	0
Amherst		–		1	–	1	–	0
Navy		–		0	–	0	–	1
McGill		–		0	–	0	–	1
Toronto		–		0	–	0	–	1
Stevens		–		1	–	2	–	5
Rutgers		–		1	–	2	–	3
Pennsylvania Military		–		0	–	1	–	1
NYU		–		0	–	2	–	1
Racine		–		0	–	1	–	0
Swarthmore		–		0	–	1	–	0
Columbia		–		0	–	3	–	2

The 1879 Massachusetts Aggies football team represented Massachusetts Agricultural College in the 1879 college football season. The team played its first football game and finished the season with a record of 1–0.

=== Schedule ===
Date	Opponent	Site	Result
November 22	Amherst	Alumni Field; Amherst, MA	W 4–0

== 1880 ==
1880 Massachusetts Aggies football
- Conference: Independent
- Record: 0–1–1
- Head coach: None
- Captain: Arthur Whittaker
- Home stadium: Alumni Field

1880 college football records
	Conf.			Overall
Team	W	L	T	W		L		T
Princeton		–		4	–	0	–	1
Yale		–		4	–	0	–	1
Kentucky University		–		2	–	0	–	0
Michigan		–		1	–	0	–	0
Harvard		–		2	–	2	–	2
Penn		–		2	–	2	–	0
Rutgers		–		2	–	2	–	0
Columbia		–		1	–	2	–	0
Amherst		–		0	–	1	–	1
Massachusetts		–		0	–	1	–	1
Stevens		–		1	–	4	–	0
Brown		–		0	–	1	–	0
CCNY		–		0	–	1	–	0
Philadelphia Crescent AC		–		0	–	1	–	0
Toronto		–		0	–	1	–	0
Centre		–		0	–	2	–	0

The 1880 Massachusetts Aggies football team represented Massachusetts Agricultural College in the 1880 college football season. Massachusetts finished the season with a record of 0–1–1.

=== Schedule ===
Date	Opponent	Site	Result
November 10	Williston Seminary	Alumni Field; Amherst, MA	L 8–10
November 13	at Amherst	Amherst, MA	T 0–0

== 1881 ==
1881 Massachusetts Aggies football
- Conference: Independent
- Record: 2–1–1
- Head coach: None
- Home stadium: Alumni Field

1881 college football records
	Conf.			Overall
Team	W	L	T	W		L		T
MIT		–		3	–	0	–	0
Richmond		–		2	–	0	–	0
Georgetown		–		1	–	0	–	0
Yale		–		5	–	0	–	1
Princeton		–		7	–	0	–	2
Penn State		–		1	–	0	–	0
Columbian University		–		1	–	0	–	1
Dartmouth		–		1	–	0	–	1
Harvard		–		6	–	1	–	1
Massachusetts		–		2	–	1	–	1
Kentucky University		–		2	–	1	–	0
Columbia		–		3	–	3	–	1
Rutgers		–		2	–	4	–	1
Stevens		–		1	–	2	–	1
Kentucky State College		–		1	–	2	–	0
CCNY		–		1	–	1	–	1
Amherst		–		0	–	3	–	2
Lewisburg		–		0	–	1	–	0
Wesleyan		–		0	–	1	–	0
Randolph–Macon		–		0	–	2	–	0
Michigan		–		0	–	3	–	0
Penn		–		0	–	5	–	0

The 1881 Massachusetts Aggies football team represented Massachusetts Agricultural College in the 1881 college football season. Massachusetts finished the season with a record of 2–1–1.

=== Schedule ===
Date	Opponent	Site	Result
October 15	at Williston Seminary	Easthampton, MA	W NA
October 22	Amherst	Amherst, MA	T 0–0
October 31	at Wesleyan	Andrus Field; Middletown, CT	W 36–0
November 12	MIT	Alumni Field; Amherst, MA	L 0–8

== 1882 ==
1882 Massachusetts Aggies football
- Conference: Independent
- Record: 0–2
- Head coach: None
- Home stadium: Alumni Field

1882 college football records
	Conf.			Overall
Team	W	L	T	W		L		T
Yale		–		8	–	0	–	0
Colorado College		–		1	–	0	–	0
Navy		–		1	–	0	–	0
Richmond		–		1	–	0	–	0
Harvard		–		7	–	1	–	0
Fordham		–		7	–	1	–	0
Princeton		–		7	–	2	–	0
Wesleyan		–		3	–	1	–	0
Rutgers		–		6	–	4	–	0
Columbian University		–		0	–	0	–	1
Dartmouth		–		1	–	1	–	0
Lake Forest		–		1	–	1	–	0
Minnesota		–		1	–	1	–	0
Northwestern		–		1	–	1	–	0
Stevens		–		1	–	1	–	1
Amherst		–		2	–	3	–	0
Penn		–		2	–	4	–	0
CCNY		–		1	–	2	–	0
Boston Tech		–		1	–	4	–	0
Randolph–Macon		–		0	–	1	–	0
Clifton AC		–		0	–	1	–	0
Lafayette		–		0	–	2	–	0
McGill		–		0	–	2	–	0
NYU		–		0	–	2	–	0
Massachusetts		–		0	–	3	–	0
Columbia		–		0	–	5	–	0

The 1882 Massachusetts Aggies football team represented Massachusetts Agricultural College in the 1882 college football season. Massachusetts finished the season with a record of 0–2.

=== Schedule ===
Date	Opponent	Site	Result
November 2	Amherst	Alumni Field; Amherst, MA	L 4–12
November 9	at Wesleyan	Andrus Field; Middletown, CT	L 0–60

== 1883 ==
1883 Massachusetts Aggies football
- Conference: Independent
- Record: 1–1
- Head coach: None
- Home stadium: Alumni Field

1883 college football records
	Conf.			Overall
Team	W	L	T	W		L		T
Yale		–		9	–	0	–	0
Gallaudet		–		2	–	0	–	0
Carleton		–		1	–	0	–	0
Johns Hopkins		–		1	–	0	–	0
NYU		–		1	–	0	–	0
Harvard		–		8	–	2	–	0
Princeton		–		7	–	1	–	0
Penn		–		6	–	2	–	1
Stevens		–		6	–	4	–	1
Massachusetts		–		1	–	1	–	0
Minnesota		–		1	–	1	–	0
Wesleyan		–		3	–	3	–	0
Williams		–		1	–	1	–	0
Fordham		–		4	–	5	–	0
Michigan		–		2	–	3	–	0
Lafayette		–		2	–	4	–	0
Johns Hopkins		–		1	–	2	–	0
Columbia		–		1	–	3	–	0
Rutgers		–		1	–	6	–	0
Amherst		–		0	–	1	–	0
Dartmouth		–		0	–	1	–	0
Hamline		–		0	–	1	–	0
Lewisburg		–		0	–	1	–	0
Navy		–		0	–	1	–	0
CCNY		–		0	–	2	–	0
Columbian University		–		0	–	2	–	0
Georgetown		–		0	–	2	–	0

The 1883 Massachusetts Aggies football team represented Massachusetts Agricultural College in the 1883 college football season. Massachusetts finished the season with a record of 1–1.

=== Schedule ===
Date	Opponent	Site	Result
November 7	at Williston Seminary	Easthampton, MA	L 0–14
November 21	at Amherst	Pratt Field; Amherst, MA	W 9–8

== 1884 ==
1884 Massachusetts Aggies football
- Conference: Independent
- Record: 1–2
- Head coach: None
- Home stadium: Alumni Field

1884 college football records
	Conf.			Overall
Team	W	L	T	W		L		T
Princeton		–		9	–	0	–	1
Yale		–		8	–	0	–	1
Michigan		–		2	–	0	–	0
Williams		–		2	–	0	–	0
Navy		–		1	–	0	–	0
Wabash		–		1	–	0	–	0
Penn		–		5	–	1	–	1
Fordham		–		5	–	1	–	0
Harvard		–		7	–	4	–	0
Wesleyan		–		3	–	2	–	0
Butler		–		1	–	1	–	0
Columbia		–		1	–	1	–	0
Rutgers		–		3	–	4	–	0
Stevens		–		4	–	5	–	0
Dartmouth		–		1	–	2	–	1
Tufts		–		2	–	4	–	1
Massachusetts		–		1	–	2	–	0
Lafayette		–		2	–	5	–	0
Johns Hopkins		–		1	–	3	–	0
Albion		–		0	–	1	–	0
CCNY		–		0	–	1	–	0
Denver		–		0	–	1	–	0
DePauw		–		0	–	1	–	0
Olivet		–		0	–	2	–	0
Amherst		–		0	–	3	–	0
Lehigh		–		0	–	4	–	0

The 1884 Massachusetts Aggies football team represented Massachusetts Agricultural College in the 1884 college football season. Massachusetts finished the season with a record of 1–2.

=== Schedule ===
Date	Opponent	Site	Result
October 11	at Wilbraham Academy	Wilbraham, MA	W 8–0
October 18	at Williston Seminary	Easthampton, MA	L NA
October 29	at Amherst	Amherst, MA	L 0–13

== 1885 ==
1885 Massachusetts Aggies football
- Conference: Independent
- Record: 3–2–1
- Head coach: None
- Home stadium: Alumni Field

1885 college football records
	Conf.			Overall
Team	W	L	T	W		L		T
Princeton		–		9	–	0	–	0
Michigan		–		3	–	0	–	0
Colorado College		–		1	–	0	–	0
Yale		–		7	–	1	–	0
Cincinnati		–		1	–	0	–	1
Penn		–		8	–	5	–	0
Lafayette		–		3	–	2	–	1
Massachusetts		–		3	–	2	–	1
Johns Hopkins		–		2	–	2	–	0
Richmond		–		1	–	1	–	0
Wesleyan		–		3	–	4	–	0
Navy		–		1	–	2	–	0
Lehigh		–		1	–	5	–	1
Rutgers		–		0	–	1	–	0
Fordham		–		0	–	3	–	0

The 1885 Massachusetts Aggies football team represented Massachusetts Agricultural College as an independent during the 1885 college football season. Massachusetts finished the season with a record of 3–2–1.

=== Schedule ===
Date	Opponent	Site	Result	Source
October 3	Amherst	Alumni Field; Amherst, MA	W 4–0	
October 5	at Amherst	Amherst, MA	T 0–0	
October 7	Amherst	Alumni Field; Amherst, MA	W 12–0	
October 13	at Wesleyan	Andrus Field; Middletown, CT	L 0–80	
October 31	Williston Seminary	Amherst, MA	W 42–12	
November 4	at Amherst	Amherst, MA	L 0–8	

== 1886 ==
1886 Massachusetts Aggies football
- Conference: Independent
- Record: 2–1
- Head coach: None
- Home stadium: Agricultural College grounds Blake Field

1886 Eastern college football independents records
	Conf.			Overall
Team	W	L	T	W		L		T
Yale		–		9	–	0	–	1
Princeton		–		7	–	0	–	1
Harvard		–		12	–	2	–	0
Lafayette		–		10	–	2	–	0
Williams		–		5	–	1	–	1
Massachusetts		–		2	–	1	–	0
Penn		–		9	–	7	–	1
Lehigh		–		4	–	3	–	1
Dartmouth		–		2	–	2	–	0
Rutgers		–		1	–	3	–	0
Wesleyan		–		2	–	6	–	0
Vermont		–		0	–	1	–	0
Stevens		–		0	–	7	–	1
Tufts		–		0	–	8	–	0
NYU		–		0	–	3	–	0
Swarthmore		–				–
Trinity (CT)		–				–

The 1886 Massachusetts Aggies football team represented Massachusetts Agricultural College in the 1886 college football season. Massachusetts finished the season with a record of 2–1.

=== Schedule ===
Date	Opponent	Site	Result	Source
October 13	Amherst	Agricultural College grounds; Amherst, MA	L 5–15	
October 20	at Williston Seminary	Easthampton, MA	W 7–6	
November 8	Tufts	Blake Field; Amherst, MA	W 6–5	

== 1887 ==
1887 Massachusetts Aggies football
- Conference: Independent
- Record: 2–3
- Head coach: None
- Home stadium: Alumni Field

1887 Eastern college football independents records
	Conf.			Overall
Team	W	L	T	W		L		T
Yale		–		9	–	0	–	0
Penn State		–		2	–	0	–	0
Harvard		–		10	–	1	–	0
Lafayette		–		7	–	2	–	0
Princeton		–		7	–	2	–	0
Lehigh		–		4	–	3	–	0
Williams		–		3	–	3	–	0
Penn		–		6	–	7	–	0
Wesleyan		–		4	–	5	–	0
Tufts		–		4	–	6	–	0
Massachusetts		–		2	–	3	–	0
Rutgers		–		2	–	6	–	0
Bucknell		–		0	–	2	–	0
Cornell		–		0	–	2	–	0
Franklin & Marshall		–		0	–	2	–	0
Vermont		–		0	–	2	–	0

The 1887 Massachusetts Aggies football team represented Massachusetts Agricultural College in the 1887 college football season. Massachusetts finished the season with a record of 2–3.

=== Schedule ===
Date	Time	Opponent	Site	Result	Source
October 8		Williston Seminary	Alumni Field; Amherst, MA	W 17–10	
October 15	3:00 p.m.	at Trinity (CT)	Ward Street grounds; Hartford, CT	L 4–32	
October 25		at Amherst	Amherst, MA	L 0–10	
October 26		at Williston Seminary	Easthampton, MA	W 26–0	
November 5		at Worcester Tech	Worcester, MA	L 0–10	

== 1888 ==
1888 Massachusetts Aggies football
- Conference: Independent
- Record: 2–4
- Head coach: None
- Captain: Arthur Nourse
- Home stadium: Alumni Field

1888 Eastern college football independents records
	Conf.			Overall
Team	W	L	T	W		L		T
Yale		–		13	–	0	–	0
Harvard		–		12	–	1	–	0
Princeton		–		11	–	1	–	0
Lehigh		–		10	–	2	–	0
Trinity (CT)		–		5	–	1	–	1
Lafayette		–		6	–	3	–	0
Cornell		–		4	–	2	–	0
Penn		–		9	–	7	–	0
Bucknell		–		2	–	3	–	0
Fordham		–		1	–	2	–	0
Massachusetts		–		2	–	5	–	0
Worcester Tech		–		2	–	5	–	0
Wesleyan		–		2	–	7	–	0
Rutgers		–		1	–	6	–	1
Penn State		–		0	–	2	–	1
Swarthmore		–		0	–	5	–	0

The 1888 Massachusetts Aggies football team represented Massachusetts Agricultural College in the 1888 college football season. Massachusetts finished the season with a record of 2–5.

=== Schedule ===
Date	Opponent	Site	Result	Source
October 6	Trinity (CT)	Alumni Field; Amherst, MA	L 0–34	
October 13	Williston Seminary	Alumni Field; Amherst, MA	W 27–0	
October 17	Williston Seminary	Alumni Field; Amherst, MA	W 17–9	
October 17	Yale freshmen	Alumni Field; Amherst, MA	L 0–32	
October 18	at Amherst	Amherst, MA	L 0–58	
October 30	Amherst	Alumni Field; Amherst, MA	L 4–45	
November 3	at Worcester Tech	Worcester, MA	L 0–49	

== 1889 ==
1889 Massachusetts Aggies football
- Conference: Independent
- Record: 2–0
- Head coach: None
- Home stadium: Alumni Field

1889 Eastern college football independents records
	Conf.			Overall
Team	W	L	T	W		L		T
Princeton		–		10	–	0	–	0
Massachusetts		–		2	–	0	–	0
Yale		–		15	–	1	–	0
Harvard		–		9	–	2	–	0
Franklin & Marshall		–		5	–	1	–	1
Dickinson		–		4	–	1	–	1
Navy		–		4	–	1	–	1
Tufts		–		3	–	1	–	0
Lehigh		–		8	–	3	–	2
Cornell		–		8	–	4	–	0
Penn		–		7	–	6	–	0
Brown		–		2	–	2	–	0
Penn State		–		2	–	2	–	0
Wesleyan		–		5	–	7	–	1
Bucknell		–		2	–	3	–	1
Lafayette		–		3	–	4	–	2
Columbia		–		2	–	7	–	2
Fordham		–		1	–	3	–	0
Rutgers		–		1	–	4	–	0
NYU		–		0	–	2	–	0

The 1889 Massachusetts Aggies football team represented Massachusetts Agricultural College in the 1889 college football season. Massachusetts finished the season with a record of 2–0.

=== Schedule ===
Date	Opponent	Site	Result	Source
November 2	Williston Seminary	Alumni Field; Amherst, MA	W 12–8	
November 16	at Williston Seminary	Easthampton, MA	W 18–6	
