= NYU Violets football, 1873–1889 =

College American football team

The NYU Violets football program, 1873–1889 represented New York University (NYU) in American football during the school's first ten seasons of college football. Highlights of these early years include:

- NYU played its first intercollegiate football game on October 18, 1873. NYU lost the game by a 6–1 score against Stevens Institute.
- NYU also played one-game seasons with Stevens in 1874, 1875, and 1876. NYU lost each of these contests.
- NYU did not field a team in 1877 or 1878.
- Intercollegiate football returned to NYU in 1879 with three games against Stevens. NYU lost two of these games and played to a tie in a third game. NYU's winless streak was extended to seven games dating back to 1873.
- NYU again ceased competing in intercollegiate football for the 1880 and 1881 seasons.
- Football returned to NYU in 1882, and the team lost games against Columbia and Stevens. The winless streak was extended to nine games across ten years.
- On November 29, 1883, NYU won its first football game, defeating a "Paterson" team by a 4–2 score.
- NYU did not participate in college football in 1884 or 1885.
- In 1886, NYU played three football games and lost all three.
- NYU did not field a team in 1887 or 1888.
- The 1889 NYU team played two games, losing both.

For its first two decades of intercollegiate football, NYU won only one game and compiled an overall record of 1–15–1.

== 1873 ==
1873 NYU Violets football
- Conference: Independent
- Record: 0–1
- Head coach: None

1873 college football records
	Conf.			Overall
Team	W		L		W		L
Princeton		–		1	–	0	–	0
Harvard		–		1	–	0	–	1
Washington and Lee		–		4	–	0	–	0
Stevens		–		3	–	1	–	0
Yale		–		2	–	1	–	0
Columbia		–		2	–	1	–	0
Rutgers		–		1	–	2	–	0
McGill		–		0	–	1	–	1
Eton		–		0	–	1	–	0
CCNY		–		0	–	1	–	0
New Jersey AC		–		0	–	1	–	0
NYU		–		0	–	1	–	0
Princeton Seminary		–		0	–	1	–	0
VMI		–		0	–	1	–	0

The 1873 NYU Violets football team represented New York University in the 1873 college football season. It was the first season of NYU football and the Violets became the fifth college football team in the United States. It played one game, losing to Stevens Institute of Technology 1–6 on October 18.

=== Schedule ===
Date	Opponent	Site	Result
October 18	Stevens		L 1–6

== 1874 ==
1874 NYU Violets football
- Conference: Independent
- Record: 0–1
- Head coach: None

1874 college football records
	Conf.			Overall
Team	W		L		W		L
Yale		–		3	–	0	–	0
Princeton		–		2	–	0	–	0
Harvard		–		1	–	1	–	0
Tufts		–		1	–	0	–	0
Stevens		–		3	–	1	–	0
Rutgers		–		1	–	3	–	0
Columbia		–		1	–	5	–	0
NYU		–		0	–	1	–	0
McGill		–		0	–	1	–	0

The 1874 NYU Violets football team represented New York University in the 1874 college football season.

=== Schedule ===
Date	Opponent	Site	Result
November 10	Stevens		L 0–6

== 1875 ==
1875 NYU Violets football
- Conference: Independent
- Record: 0–1
- Head coach: None

1875 college football records
	Conf.			Overall
Team	W	L	T	W		L		T
Harvard		–		4	–	0	–	0
Princeton		–		2	–	0	–	0
Columbia		–		4	–	1	–	1
Rutgers		–		1	–	1	–	1
Yale		–		2	–	2	–	0
Stevens		–		3	–	3	–	0
Tufts		–		0	–	1	–	0
NYU		–		0	–	1	–	0
Wesleyan		–		0	–	1	–	0
Bates		–		0	–	1	–	0
Canada All-Stars		–		0	–	2	–	0
CCNY		–		0	–	3	–	0

The 1875 NYU Violets football team represented New York University in the 1875 college football season.

=== Schedule ===
Date	Opponent	Site	Result
October 17	at Stevens	Hoboken, NJ	L 0–5

== 1876 ==
1876 NYU Violets football
- Conference: Independent
- Record: 0–1
- Head coach: None

1876 college football records
	Conf.			Overall
Team	W	L	T	W		L		T
Yale		–		3	–	0	–	0
Rutgers		–		1	–	0	–	0
Harvard		–		3	–	1	–	0
Princeton		–		3	–	2	–	0
Stevens		–		2	–	2	–	0
CCNY		–		1	–	1	–	0
Penn		–		1	–	2	–	0
Columbia		–		1	–	3	–	0
Canada All-Stars		–		0	–	1	–	0
McGill		–		0	–	1	–	0
Northwestern		–		0	–	1	–	0
Philadelphia All-Stars		–		0	–	1	–	0
NYU		–		0	–	2	–	0

The 1876 NYU Violets football team was an American football team that represented New York University in the 1876 college football season. The team played one game, losing to Stevens Institute of Technology by an 8–0 score.

=== Schedule ===
Date	Opponent	Site	Result	Source
October 31	at Stevens	grounds at foot of Ninth Street; Hoboken, NJ	L 0–8	
	CCNY		L	

== 1879 ==
1879 NYU Violets football
- Conference: Independent
- Record: 0–2–1
- Head coach: None

1879 college football records
	Conf.			Overall
Team	W	L	T	W		L		T
Princeton		–		4	–	0	–	1
Yale		–		3	–	0	–	2
Massachusetts		–		1	–	0	–	0
Michigan		–		1	–	0	–	1
Haverford		–		1	–	0	–	1
Harvard		–		2	–	1	–	2
Penn		–		2	–	2	–	0
Amherst		–		1	–	1	–	0
Navy		–		0	–	0	–	1
McGill		–		0	–	0	–	1
Toronto		–		0	–	0	–	1
Stevens		–		1	–	2	–	5
Rutgers		–		1	–	2	–	3
Pennsylvania Military		–		0	–	1	–	1
NYU		–		0	–	2	–	1
Racine		–		0	–	1	–	0
Swarthmore		–		0	–	1	–	0
Columbia		–		0	–	3	–	2

The 1879 NYU Violets football team was an American football team that represented New York University in the 1879 college football season. The team played three games, losing to Stevens Institute of Technology twice and tying them once.

=== Schedule ===
Date	Opponent	Site	Result
	Stevens Freshmen		L
	Stevens Freshmen		L
	Stevens Freshmen		T

== 1882 ==
1882 NYU Violets football
- Conference: Independent
- Record: 0–2
- Head coach: None

1882 college football records
	Conf.			Overall
Team	W	L	T	W		L		T
Yale		–		8	–	0	–	0
Colorado College		–		1	–	0	–	0
Navy		–		1	–	0	–	0
Richmond		–		1	–	0	–	0
Harvard		–		7	–	1	–	0
Fordham		–		7	–	1	–	0
Princeton		–		7	–	2	–	0
Wesleyan		–		3	–	1	–	0
Rutgers		–		6	–	4	–	0
Columbian University		–		0	–	0	–	1
Dartmouth		–		1	–	1	–	0
Lake Forest		–		1	–	1	–	0
Minnesota		–		1	–	1	–	0
Northwestern		–		1	–	1	–	0
Stevens		–		1	–	1	–	1
Amherst		–		2	–	3	–	0
Penn		–		2	–	4	–	0
CCNY		–		1	–	2	–	0
MIT		–		1	–	4	–	0
Randolph–Macon		–		0	–	1	–	0
Clifton AC		–		0	–	1	–	0
Lafayette		–		0	–	2	–	0
McGill		–		0	–	2	–	0
NYU		–		0	–	2	–	0
Massachusetts		–		0	–	3	–	0
Columbia		–		0	–	5	–	0

The 1882 NYU Violets football team was an American football team that represented New York University in the 1882 college football season. The team played two games, losing to Stevens Prep school and Columbia College.

=== Schedule ===
Date	Opponent	Site	Result
	at Columbia		L
	at Stevens Prep		L

== 1883 ==
1883 NYU Violets football
- Conference: Independent
- Record: 1–0
- Head coach: None

1883 college football records
	Conf.			Overall
Team	W	L	T	W		L		T
Yale		–		9	–	0	–	0
Gallaudet		–		2	–	0	–	0
Carleton		–		1	–	0	–	0
Johns Hopkins		–		1	–	0	–	0
NYU		–		1	–	0	–	0
Harvard		–		8	–	2	–	0
Princeton		–		7	–	1	–	0
Penn		–		6	–	2	–	1
Stevens		–		6	–	4	–	1
Massachusetts		–		1	–	1	–	0
Minnesota		–		1	–	1	–	0
Wesleyan		–		3	–	3	–	0
Williams		–		1	–	1	–	0
Fordham		–		4	–	5	–	0
Michigan		–		2	–	3	–	0
Lafayette		–		2	–	4	–	0
Johns Hopkins		–		1	–	2	–	0
Columbia		–		1	–	3	–	0
Rutgers		–		1	–	6	–	0
Amherst		–		0	–	1	–	0
Dartmouth		–		0	–	1	–	0
Hamline		–		0	–	1	–	0
Lewisburg		–		0	–	1	–	0
Navy		–		0	–	1	–	0
CCNY		–		0	–	2	–	0
Columbian University		–		0	–	2	–	0
Georgetown		–		0	–	2	–	0

The 1883 NYU Violets football team was an American football team that represented New York University in the 1883 college football season. The team played two games, the score for week one is unknown while the score for the game against Paterson was a 4–2 win.

=== Schedule ===
Date	Opponent	Site	Result
November 26	at Adelphi Academy		?
November 29	at Paterson		W 4–2

== 1886 ==
1886 NYU Violets football
- Conference: Independent
- Record: 0–3

1886 Eastern college football independents records
	Conf.			Overall
Team	W	L	T	W		L		T
Yale		–		9	–	0	–	1
Princeton		–		7	–	0	–	1
Harvard		–		12	–	2	–	0
Lafayette		–		10	–	2	–	0
Williams		–		5	–	1	–	1
Massachusetts		–		2	–	1	–	0
Penn		–		9	–	7	–	1
Lehigh		–		4	–	3	–	1
Dartmouth		–		2	–	2	–	0
Amherst		–		3	–	4	–	0
Rutgers		–		1	–	3	–	0
Wesleyan		–		2	–	6	–	0
MIT		–		2	–	6	–	1
Vermont		–		0	–	1	–	0
Stevens		–		0	–	7	–	1
Tufts		–		0	–	8	–	0
NYU		–		0	–	3	–	0
Swarthmore		–				–
Trinity (CT)		–				–

The 1886 NYU Violets football team was an American football team that represented New York University as an independent during the 1886 college football season. The Violets compiled an 0–3 record for the season.

=== Schedule ===
Date	Opponent	Site	Result	Source
November 2	at Olympic Athletic Club	Brooklyn Athletic Field; Brooklyn, NY	L 0–66	
November 18	at Staten Island Cricket Club	St George's Cricket Club; Staten Island, NY	L 4–8	
November 20	at Crescent Athletic Club		L 0–36	

== 1889 ==
1889 NYU Violets football
- Conference: Independent
- Record: 0–2

1889 Eastern college football independents records
	Conf.			Overall
Team	W	L	T	W		L		T
Princeton		–		10	–	0	–	0
Massachusetts		–		2	–	0	–	0
Yale		–		15	–	1	–	0
Harvard		–		9	–	2	–	0
Franklin & Marshall		–		5	–	1	–	1
Dickinson		–		4	–	1	–	1
Navy		–		4	–	1	–	1
Tufts		–		3	–	1	–	0
Lehigh		–		8	–	3	–	2
Cornell		–		8	–	4	–	0
Penn		–		7	–	6	–	0
Brown		–		2	–	2	–	0
Penn State		–		2	–	2	–	0
Wesleyan		–		5	–	7	–	1
Bucknell		–		2	–	3	–	1
Lafayette		–		3	–	4	–	2
Columbia		–		2	–	7	–	2
Fordham		–		1	–	3	–	0
Rutgers		–		1	–	4	–	0
NYU		–		0	–	2	–	0

The 1889 NYU Violets football team was an American football team that represented New York University as an independent during the 1889 college football season. The Violets compiled an 0–2 record for the season.

=== Schedule ===
Date	Opponent	Site	Result	Source
November 23	Clinton Athletic Club	Governors Island; New York, NY	L 0–10	
November 29	vs. CCNY	Manhattan Athletic Club Grounds; New York, NY	L 0–22	
