= 1882 Yale Bulldogs football team =

American college football season

1882 Yale Bulldogs football
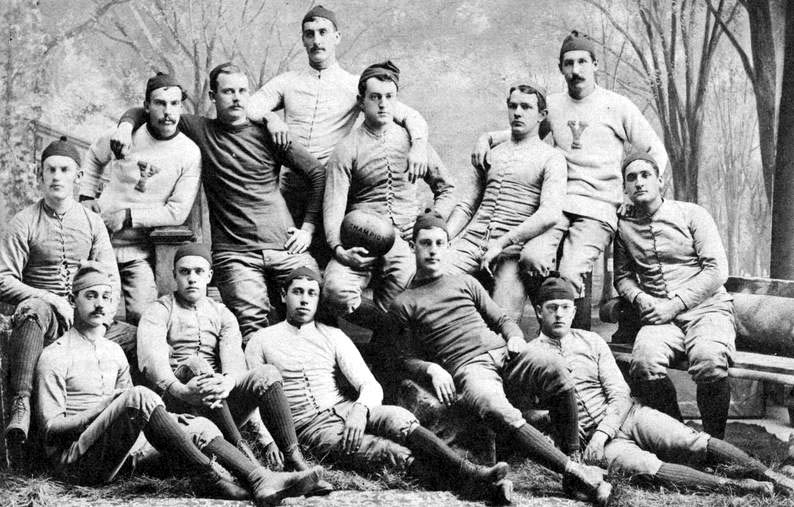

National champion
- Conference: Independent
- Record: 8–0
- Head coach: None
- Captain: Ray Tompkins
- Home stadium: Hamilton Park

1882 college football records
| | Conf. | | | Overall |
| Team | W | L | T | W | | L | | T |
|---|---|---|---|---|---|---|---|---|
| Yale | | – | | 8 | – | 0 | – | 0 |
| Colorado College | | – | | 1 | – | 0 | – | 0 |
| Navy | | – | | 1 | – | 0 | – | 0 |
| Richmond | | – | | 1 | – | 0 | – | 0 |
| Harvard | | – | | 7 | – | 1 | – | 0 |
| Fordham | | – | | 7 | – | 1 | – | 0 |
| Princeton | | – | | 7 | – | 2 | – | 0 |
| Wesleyan | | – | | 3 | – | 1 | – | 0 |
| Rutgers | | – | | 6 | – | 4 | – | 0 |
| Columbian University | | – | | 0 | – | 0 | – | 1 |
| Dartmouth | | – | | 1 | – | 1 | – | 0 |
| Lake Forest | | – | | 1 | – | 1 | – | 0 |
| Minnesota | | – | | 1 | – | 1 | – | 0 |
| Northwestern | | – | | 1 | – | 1 | – | 0 |
| Stevens | | – | | 1 | – | 1 | – | 1 |
| Amherst | | – | | 2 | – | 3 | – | 0 |
| Penn | | – | | 2 | – | 4 | – | 0 |
| CCNY | | – | | 1 | – | 2 | – | 0 |
| Boston Tech | | – | | 1 | – | 4 | – | 0 |
| Randolph–Macon | | – | | 0 | – | 1 | – | 0 |
| Clifton AC | | – | | 0 | – | 1 | – | 0 |
| Lafayette | | – | | 0 | – | 2 | – | 0 |
| McGill | | – | | 0 | – | 2 | – | 0 |
| NYU | | – | | 0 | – | 2 | – | 0 |
| Massachusetts | | – | | 0 | – | 3 | – | 0 |
| Columbia | | – | | 0 | – | 5 | – | 0 |

The 1882 Yale Bulldogs football team represented Yale University in the 1882 college football season. The team compiled an 8–0 record, shut out seven of eight opponents, and outscored all opponents, 51 to 1. The team was retroactively named as the national champion by the Billingsley Report, National Championship Foundation, and Parke H. Davis.

Henry Twombly, the team's quarterback, became a lawyer who participated in the incorporation of General Electric and Otis Elevator Company. Ray Tompkins was the team captain of the 1882 and 1883 teams. He became the president of the Chemung Canal Trust Company. Halfback Wyllys Terry went on to set a college football record in 1884 with a 115-yard run against Wesleyan. Rusher Louis K. Hull was also captain of the rowing team and was credited with winning more athletic letters than any Yale student. Back Benjamin Wisner Bacon became a noted theologian and leader of the Yale Divinity School.

== Schedule ==
| Date | Opponent | Site | Result | Attendance | Source |
|---|---|---|---|---|---|
| October 7 | Wesleyan | Hamilton Park; New Haven, CT | W 9–0 | | |
| October 21 | Rutgers | Hamilton Park; New Haven, CT | W 9–0 | | |
| October 28 | at Rutgers | New Brunswick, NJ | W 5–0 | | |
| November 4 | Boston Tech | Hamilton Park; New Haven, CT | W 6–0 | | |
| November 8 | at Amherst | Amherst, MA | W 8–0 | | |
| November 18 | Columbia | Hamilton Park; New Haven, CT | W 11–0 | 600 | |
| November 25 | at Harvard | Holmes Field; Cambridge, MA (rivalry) | W 1–0 | 3,000–4,000 | |
| November 30 | vs. Princeton | Polo Grounds; New York, NY (rivalry) | W 2–1 | 6,000–7,000 | |

== Roster ==
- Rushers: Howard H. Knapp, William Hugh Hyndman, Ray Tompkins, Louis K. Hull, F. G. Peters, Charles S. Beck, and A. L. Farwell
- Quarterback: Henry Twombly
- Halfbacks: Eugene Lamb Richards and Wyllys Terry
- Back: Benjamin Wisner Bacon
