= 1889 Furman Baptists football team =

American college football season

1889 Furman Baptists football
- Conference: Independent
- Record: 0–2
- Head coach: William Beattie (1st season)

1889 Southern college football independents records
	Conf.			Overall
Team	W	L	T	W		L		T
Trinity (NC)		–		2	–	0	–	0
Georgetown		–		5	–	1	–	0
Navy		–		4	–	1	–	1
Virginia		–		4	–	2	–	0
Wake Forest		–		2	–	2	–	0
North Carolina		–		1	–	1	–	0
Delaware		–		1	–	1	–	1
Johns Hopkins		–		2	–	4	–	1
Richmond		–		1	–	2	–	0
Dover Conference Academy		–		0	–	2	–	1
Furman		–		0	–	2	–	0

The 1889 Furman Baptists football team represented Furman University as an independent during the 1889 college football season. Led by William Beattie in his first and only season as head coach, Furman compiled a record of 0–2.

== Schedule ==
Date	Opponent	Site	Result
December 14	Wofford	(rivalry)	L 1–5
January 18, 1890	Wofford		L 0–2
