= 1889 Virginia Orange and Blue football team =

American college football season

1889 Virginia Orange and Blue football

Southern champion
- Conference: Independent
- Record: 4–2
- Head coach: None
- Captain: Sidney M. Neely
- Home stadium: Madison Hall Field

1889 Southern college football independents records
	Conf.			Overall
Team	W	L	T	W		L		T
Trinity (NC)		–		2	–	0	–	0
Georgetown		–		5	–	1	–	0
Navy		–		4	–	1	–	1
Virginia		–		4	–	2	–	0
Wake Forest		–		2	–	2	–	0
North Carolina		–		1	–	1	–	0
Delaware		–		1	–	1	–	1
Johns Hopkins		–		2	–	4	–	1
Richmond		–		1	–	2	–	0
Dover Conference Academy		–		0	–	2	–	1
Furman		–		0	–	2	–	0

The 1889 Virginia Orange and Blue football team represented the University of Virginia as an independent during the 1889 college football season. The team had no known coach, and went 4–2 and claims a Southern championship.

== Schedule ==
Date	Time	Opponent	Site	Result	Source
October 8		Pantops Academy	Madison Hall Field; Charlottesville, VA	W 44–0	
November 1		Georgetown	Madison Hall Field; Charlottesville, VA	W 34–0	
November 28		Johns Hopkins	Madison Hall Field; Charlottesville, VA	W 68–0	
November 30		Lehigh	Madison Hall Field; Charlottesville, VA	L 12–26	
December 7		at Navy	Annapolis, MD	L 6–26	
December 9	2:45 p.m.	vs. Wake Forest	Boschen's Park; Richmond, VA	W 36–4	
