= Richmond Colts football, 1881–1889 =

American college football seasons

The Richmond Colts football teams from 1881 to 1889 represented Richmond College (later renamed the University of Richmond) in American football. These were the earliest years of college football at the school. Highlights included the following:

- On December 3, 1881, Richmond played its first intercollegiate football game, defeating Randolph–Macon, 3–0.
- On November 12, 1885, Richmond lost its first intercollegiate football game, losing to Randolph–Macon.

== 1881 ==
1881 Richmond Colts football
- Conference: Independent
- Record: 2–0
- Head coach: M. C. Taylor (1st season)
- Captain: George W. Quick

1881 college football records
	Conf.			Overall
Team	W	L	T	W		L		T
MIT		–		3	–	0	–	0
Richmond		–		2	–	0	–	0
Georgetown		–		1	–	0	–	0
Yale		–		5	–	0	–	1
Princeton		–		7	–	0	–	2
Penn State		–		1	–	0	–	0
Columbian University		–		1	–	0	–	1
Dartmouth		–		1	–	0	–	1
Harvard		–		6	–	1	–	1
Massachusetts		–		2	–	1	–	1
Kentucky University		–		2	–	1	–	0
Columbia		–		3	–	3	–	1
Rutgers		–		2	–	4	–	1
Stevens		–		1	–	2	–	1
Kentucky State College		–		1	–	2	–	0
CCNY		–		1	–	1	–	1
Amherst		–		0	–	3	–	2
Lewisburg		–		0	–	1	–	0
Wesleyan		–		0	–	1	–	0
Randolph–Macon		–		0	–	2	–	0
Michigan		–		0	–	3	–	0
Penn		–		0	–	5	–	0

The 1881 Richmond Colts football team was an American football team that represented Richmond College (now known as the University of Richmond) as an independent during the 1881 college football season. They compiled a 2–0 record with both wins coming against Randolph–Macon of Ashland, Virginia.

=== Schedule ===
Date	Opponent	Site	Result
December 3	at Randolph–Macon	Ashland, VA	W 3–0
December 17	Randolph–Macon	Richmond, VA	W 3–0

== 1882 ==
1882 Richmond Colts football
- Conference: Independent
- Record: 1–0
- Head coach: C. M. Hazen (1st season)
- Captain: W. Wythe Davis

1882 college football records
	Conf.			Overall
Team	W	L	T	W		L		T
Yale		–		8	–	0	–	0
Colorado College		–		1	–	0	–	0
Navy		–		1	–	0	–	0
Richmond		–		1	–	0	–	0
Harvard		–		7	–	1	–	0
Fordham		–		7	–	1	–	0
Princeton		–		7	–	2	–	0
Wesleyan		–		3	–	1	–	0
Rutgers		–		6	–	4	–	0
Columbian University		–		0	–	0	–	1
Dartmouth		–		1	–	1	–	0
Lake Forest		–		1	–	1	–	0
Minnesota		–		1	–	1	–	0
Northwestern		–		1	–	1	–	0
Stevens		–		1	–	1	–	1
Amherst		–		2	–	3	–	0
Penn		–		2	–	4	–	0
CCNY		–		1	–	2	–	0
MIT		–		1	–	4	–	0
Randolph–Macon		–		0	–	1	–	0
Clifton AC		–		0	–	1	–	0
Lafayette		–		0	–	2	–	0
McGill		–		0	–	2	–	0
NYU		–		0	–	2	–	0
Massachusetts		–		0	–	3	–	0
Columbia		–		0	–	5	–	0

The 1882 Richmond Colts football team was an American football team that represented Richmond College (now known as the University of Richmond) as an independent during the 1882 college football season.

=== Schedule ===
Date	Opponent	Site	Result
December 9	Randolph–Macon	Richmond, VA	W 5–1

== 1885 ==
1885 Richmond Colts football
- Conference: Independent
- Record: 1–1
- Head coach: C. M. Hazen (2nd season)
- Captain: William A. Harris

The 1885 Richmond Colts football team was an American football team that represented Richmond College (now known as the University of Richmond) as an independent during the 1885 college football season.

=== Schedule ===
Date	Opponent	Site	Result
November 12	Randolph–Macon	Richmond, VA	W 3–1
November 12	Randolph–Macon	Richmond, VA	L 1–2

== 1886 ==
1886 Richmond Colts football
- Conference: Independent
- Record: 1–1
- Head coach: C. M. Hazen (3rd season)
- Captain: Herbert H. Harris

1886 Southern college football independents records
	Conf.			Overall
Team	W	L	T	W		L		T
Navy		–		3	–	3	–	0
Johns Hopkins		–		2	–	2	–	1
Richmond		–		1	–	1	–	0
Randolph–Macon		–				–

The 1886 Richmond Colts football team was an American football team that represented Richmond College (now known as the University of Richmond) as an independent during the 1886 college football season.

=== Schedule ===
Date	Opponent	Site	Result
October 21	Randolph–Macon	Richmond, VA	L 0–1
November 20	at Randolph–Macon	Ashland, VA	W 3–1

== 1887 ==
1887 Richmond Colts football
- Conference: Independent
- Record: 1–1
- Head coach: H. R. Hundley (1st season)
- Captain: H. R. Hundley

1887 Southern college football independents records
	Conf.			Overall
Team	W	L	T	W		L		T
Navy		–		3	–	1	–	0
Georgetown		–		2	–	1	–	0
Richmond		–		1	–	1	–	0
Virginia		–		0	–	0	–	1
Johns Hopkins		–		0	–	2	–	0

The 1887 Richmond Colts football team was an American football team that represented Richmond College (now known as the University of Richmond) as an independent during the 1887 college football season.

=== Schedule ===
Date	Opponent	Site	Result	Source
November 12	at McCabe University	Petersburg, VA	L 0–57	
November 24	Randolph–Macon	Richmond, VA	W 14–13	

== 1888 ==
1888 Richmond Colts football
- Conference: Independent
- Record: 1–2
- Head coach: C. M. Hazen (4th season)
- Captain: Cecil H. Baker

1888 Southern college football independents records
	Conf.			Overall
Team	W	L	T	W		L		T
Georgetown		–		4	–	2	–	0
Trinity (NC)		–		2	–	1	–	0
Virginia		–		2	–	1	–	0
Wake Forest		–		2	–	1	–	0
Johns Hopkins		–		6	–	5	–	0
Richmond		–		1	–	2	–	0
North Carolina		–		1	–	3	–	0
Navy		–		1	–	4	–	0
Gallaudet		–				–
Randolph–Macon		–				–
St. John's (MD)		–				–

The 1888 Richmond Colts football team was an American football team that represented Richmond College (now known as the University of Richmond) as an independent during the 1888 college football season.

=== Schedule ===
Date	Opponent	Site	Result
November 12	at Randolph–Macon	Ashland, VA	W 11–0
November 29	Petersburg A.C.	Richmond, VA	L 0–6
December 9	McCabe University	Richmond, VA	L 0–6

== 1889 ==
1889 Richmond Colts football
- Conference: Independent
- Record: 1–2
- Head coach: Frank Johnson (1st season)
- Captain: Frank Johnson
- Home stadium: Boschen's Park

1889 Southern college football independents records
	Conf.			Overall
Team	W	L	T	W		L		T
Trinity (NC)		–		2	–	0	–	0
Georgetown		–		5	–	1	–	0
Navy		–		4	–	1	–	1
Virginia		–		4	–	2	–	0
Wake Forest		–		2	–	2	–	0
North Carolina		–		1	–	1	–	0
Delaware		–		1	–	1	–	1
Johns Hopkins		–		2	–	4	–	1
Richmond		–		1	–	2	–	0
Dover Conference Academy		–		0	–	2	–	1
Furman		–		0	–	2	–	0

The 1889 Richmond Colts football team was an American football team that represented Richmond College (now known as the University of Richmond) as an independent during the 1889 college football season.

=== Schedule ===
Date	Time	Opponent	Site	Result	Attendance	Source
November 28	2:30 p.m.	University School of Petersburg	Boschen's Park; Richmond, VA	L 0–6	300	
December 10	3:30 p.m.	at Wake Forest	Boschen's Park; Richmond, VA	L 14–32		
December 16		Randolph–Macon	Richmond, VA	W 42–0		
