= 1889 Dover Conference Academy Athletic Club football team =

American college football season

1889 Dover Conference Academy Athletic Club football
- Conference: Independent
- Record: 0–2–1
- Head coach: Unknown

1889 Southern college football independents records
	Conf.			Overall
Team	W	L	T	W		L		T
Trinity (NC)		–		2	–	0	–	0
Georgetown		–		5	–	1	–	0
Navy		–		4	–	1	–	1
Virginia		–		4	–	2	–	0
Wake Forest		–		2	–	2	–	0
North Carolina		–		1	–	1	–	0
Delaware		–		1	–	1	–	1
Johns Hopkins		–		2	–	4	–	1
Richmond		–		1	–	2	–	0
Dover Conference Academy		–		0	–	2	–	1
Furman		–		0	–	2	–	0

The 1889 Dover Conference Academy Athletic Club football team represented Dover Conference Academy in the 1889 college football season as an independent. Results may be incomplete, but Dover played in at least three games, compiling a 0–2–1 record.

== Schedule ==
Date	Time	Opponent	Site	Result	Source
November 16	3:45 p.m.	Friends (DE)	Dover, DE	L 0–32	
December 7		at Delaware	Newark, DE	T 0–0	
		Washington (MD)		L 0–18	
