= William Harrison Mace =

American historian (1852–1938)

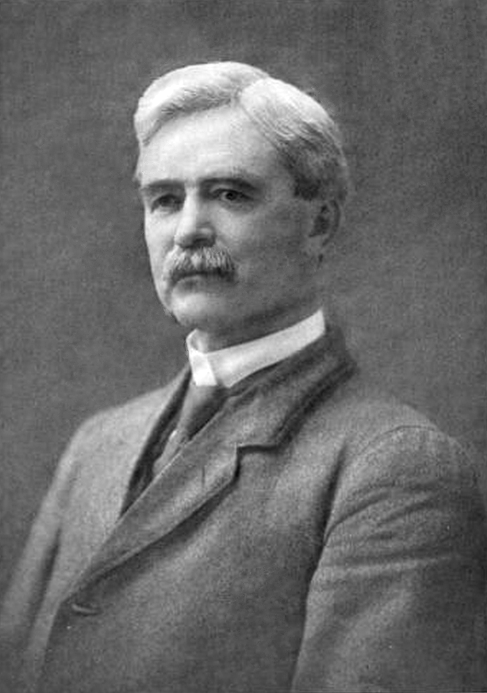
- Mace in 1916
- Born: November 27, 1852 near Lexington, Indiana, United States
- Died: August 10, 1938 (aged 85); Gananoque, Ontario, Canada
- Education: Indiana State University, University of Michigan, University of Jena
- Known for: Professor of American History

William Harrison Mace (November 27, 1852 – August 10, 1938) was a professor of American history.

== Biography ==
Mace was born on a farm near Lexington, Indiana, in 1852. He was the son of Ira Mace and Nancy S. (Johnson) Mace. Mace attended Lexington High School and Indiana State Normal School in Terre Haute, Indiana. After graduating from Indiana State in 1876, Mace became a teacher for three terms in a country school. He later served as a high school principal in Logansport, Indiana (1876–1877) and Winamac, Indiana (1877–1879). He next taught history in the schools of Cass County, and Pulaski County, Indiana, and at the Indiana State Normal School.

In 1881, he enrolled at the University of Michigan, where he studied history and received his degree with Phi Beta Kappa honors in 1883. While attending Michigan, he played college football as rusher for the 1882 Michigan Wolverines football team.

After graduating from Michigan, Mace served as the superintendent of public schools in McGregor, Iowa from 1883 to 1885. In 1885, he joined the faculty of DePauw University Normal School, serving as a professor of history from 1885 to 1890. He also received his master's degree in history from Indiana University Bloomington in 1889.

In 1891, Mace joined the faculty of Syracuse University. He was a professor of history at Syracuse from 1891 to 1916. He earned his Ph.D. in history at the University of Jena in Germany in 1897. Mace was the author of many historical works, including Lincoln, The Man of the People, The Story of Old Europe and Young America, A School History of the United States, Mace's History Reader, Mace's Primary History: Stories of Heroism, A Working Manual of American History for Teachers and Students, Method in History for Teachers and Students, and Outline and notes on United States history.

Mace married Julia Ida Dodson in September 1878. They had one child, Deirdre Frances, born in April 1886.

Mace retired from the Syracuse University faculty in 1916. He was later named dean emeritus of Syracuse University. He died in August 1938 at his summer home in Gananoque, Ontario at age 85.
