= Ray Tompkins =

American football player and businessman (1861–1918)

Yale Bulldogs
- Position: Rusher

Personal information
- Born: January 28, 1861; Lawrenceville, Pennsylvania, U.S.
- Died: June 30, 1918; Elmira, New York, U.S.

Career information
- College: Yale (1881–1883)

Awards and highlights
- National championship (1881, 1882, 1883)

Ray Tompkins (January 28, 1861 – June 30, 1918) was an American football player and businessman.

== Early life ==
Tompkins was born in 1861 in Lawrenceville, Pennsylvania. His father was engaged in the lumber business in Tioga County, Pennsylvania. In 1870, the family moved to Elmira, New York, engaging in the wholesale grocery business. Tompkins received early education in the Elmira public schools, the Elmira Free Academy, and the Williston Seminary in East Hampton, Massachusetts.

== Yale ==
In 1879, Tompkins enrolled at Yale University. He was a multi-sport athlete at Yale, competing in football, baseball, and crew. He played on the undefeated 1881, 1882, and 1883 Yale Bulldogs football teams that compiled a combined record of 22–0–1 and have been recognized as national champions for each year. He was the captain of the 1882 and 1883 championship teams. While at Yale, he was also a member of Skull and Bones and Delta Kappa Epsilon.

== Family and later years ==
Tompkins was married to Sarah Ross Wey in 1893.

After graduating from Yale, Tompkins returned to Elmira and engaged in the family's wholesale grocery business. He later served as the president of the Elmira W. L. & Railroad Company. He was also the president of the Chemung Canal Trust Company, a banking company in Elmira. He died in 1918 at age 57 after a long illness. He left his estate in trust for his wife.

Both the Ray Tompkins Memorial, originally a 720 acre wilderness in northwest New Haven, home to the Yale Golf Course, and the Ray Tompkins House on campus, which is home to Yale's Athletic Department, were built through a bequest from his wife, Sarah Wey Tompkins.
