= 1882 Princeton Tigers football team =

American college football season

1882 Princeton Tigers football
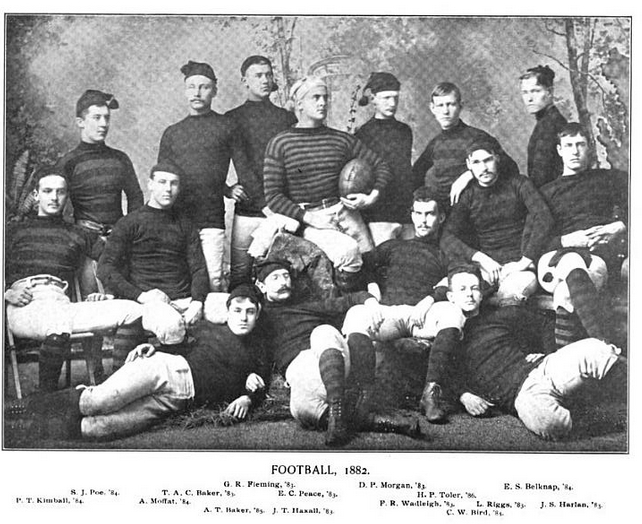
- Conference: Independent
- Record: 7–2
- Head coach: None
- Captain: E. C. Peace

1882 college football records
	Conf.			Overall
Team	W	L	T	W		L		T
Yale		–		8	–	0	–	0
Colorado College		–		1	–	0	–	0
Navy		–		1	–	0	–	0
Richmond		–		1	–	0	–	0
Harvard		–		7	–	1	–	0
Fordham		–		7	–	1	–	0
Princeton		–		7	–	2	–	0
Wesleyan		–		3	–	1	–	0
Rutgers		–		6	–	4	–	0
Columbian University		–		0	–	0	–	1
Dartmouth		–		1	–	1	–	0
Lake Forest		–		1	–	1	–	0
Minnesota		–		1	–	1	–	0
Northwestern		–		1	–	1	–	0
Stevens		–		1	–	1	–	1
Amherst		–		2	–	3	–	0
Penn		–		2	–	4	–	0
CCNY		–		1	–	2	–	0
MIT		–		1	–	4	–	0
Randolph–Macon		–		0	–	1	–	0
Clifton AC		–		0	–	1	–	0
Lafayette		–		0	–	2	–	0
McGill		–		0	–	2	–	0
NYU		–		0	–	2	–	0
Massachusetts		–		0	–	3	–	0
Columbia		–		0	–	5	–	0

The 1882 Princeton Tigers football team represented the College of New Jersey, then more commonly known as Princeton College, in the 1882 college football season. The team finished with a 7–2 record, outscoring their opponents, 44 to 4. The team's captain was E. C. Peace.

== Schedule ==
Date	Time	Opponent	Site	Result	Attendance	Source
October 7		Princeton alumni	Princeton, NJ	W 5–0		
October 14		Rutgers	Princeton, NJ (rivalry)	W 5–0		
October 28		Penn	Princeton, NJ (rivalry)	W 8–0		
November 7		at Columbia	Polo Grounds; New York, NY	W 8–0		
November 11	2:50 p.m.	at Penn	Recreation Park; Philadelphia, PA	W 10–0		
November 14		at Rutgers	New Brunswick, NJ	W 3–0		
November 18		at Harvard	Holmes Field; Cambridge, MA (rivalry)	L 1–2	1,000	
November 25		Columbia	Princeton, NJ	W 3–0		
November 30		vs. Yale	Polo Grounds; New York, NY (rivalry)	L 1–2	6,000–7,000	

== Game summaries ==
On November 7, Princeton defeated Columbia at the Polo Grounds in New York. The game was played in two innings of 45 minutes each. Princeton won the game with eight goals and three touchdowns while Columbia was held to one safety touchdown.

On November 11, Princeton defeated Penn at Recreation Park in Philadelphia. Princeton scored 10 goals and four touchdowns, and Penn was held scoreless.

Princeton's game with Harvard was played on November 18 in Cambridge before a crowd of around 1,000 spectators, including a "score of ladies." Several inches of snow were cleared off the field before the game. Each team scored one goal, however Harvard's was from the field while Princeton's was after a touchdown. The rules stated a touchdown before a goal did not count, so Harvard's lone touchdown (with a missed goal kick) won the game.

On November 25, Princeton defeated Columbia in the second match of the year between the schools. Princeton scored three goals and one touchdown and held Columbia scoreless.

On Thursday, November 30, after the Polo Grounds in New York had been cleared of snow, Princeton lost to Yale before a crowd of between 6,000 and 7,000 people, including hundreds of ladies.
