= 1889 Wake Forest Baptists football team =

American college football season

1889 Wake Forest Baptists football
- Conference: Independent
- Record: 2–2
- Head coach: W. C. Riddick (1st season)
- Captain: Oscar Riddick

1889 Southern college football independents records
	Conf.			Overall
Team	W	L	T	W		L		T
Trinity (NC)		–		2	–	0	–	0
Georgetown		–		5	–	1	–	0
Navy		–		4	–	1	–	1
Virginia		–		4	–	2	–	0
Wake Forest		–		2	–	2	–	0
North Carolina		–		1	–	1	–	0
Delaware		–		1	–	1	–	1
Johns Hopkins		–		2	–	4	–	1
Richmond		–		1	–	2	–	0
Dover Conference Academy		–		0	–	2	–	1
Furman		–		0	–	2	–	0

The 1889 Wake Forest Baptists football team was an American football team that represented Wake Forest College as an independent during the 1889 college football season. Led by W. C. Riddick in his second and final season as head coach, the Baptists compiled a record of 2–2.

== Schedule ==
Date	Time	Opponent	Site	Result	Source
November 22		at North Carolina	Campus Athletic Field (I); Chapel Hill, NC (rivalry)	W 18–8	
November 28	3:00 p.m.	vs. Trinity (NC)	Athletic Park; Raleigh, NC (rivalry)	L 4–8	
December 9	2:45 p.m.	vs. Virginia	Boschen's Park; Richmond, VA	L 4–36	
December 10	3:00 p.m.	at Richmond	Boschen's Park; Richmond, VA	W 32–14	
