= 1882 Minnesota Golden Gophers football team =

American college football season

1882 Minnesota Golden Gophers football
- Conference: Independent
- Record: 1–1
- Head coach: None
- Captain: A. J. Baldwin

1882 college football records
	Conf.			Overall
Team	W	L	T	W		L		T
Yale		–		8	–	0	–	0
Colorado College		–		1	–	0	–	0
Navy		–		1	–	0	–	0
Richmond		–		1	–	0	–	0
Harvard		–		7	–	1	–	0
Fordham		–		7	–	1	–	0
Princeton		–		7	–	2	–	0
Wesleyan		–		3	–	1	–	0
Rutgers		–		6	–	4	–	0
Columbian University		–		0	–	0	–	1
Dartmouth		–		1	–	1	–	0
Lake Forest		–		1	–	1	–	0
Minnesota		–		1	–	1	–	0
Northwestern		–		1	–	1	–	0
Stevens		–		1	–	1	–	1
Amherst		–		2	–	3	–	0
Penn		–		2	–	4	–	0
CCNY		–		1	–	2	–	0
MIT		–		1	–	4	–	0
Randolph–Macon		–		0	–	1	–	0
Clifton AC		–		0	–	1	–	0
Lafayette		–		0	–	2	–	0
McGill		–		0	–	2	–	0
NYU		–		0	–	2	–	0
Massachusetts		–		0	–	3	–	0
Columbia		–		0	–	5	–	0

The 1882 Minnesota Golden Gophers football team represented the University of Minnesota in the 1882 college football season. The inaugural Minnesota football team did not have a coach. The first known mention of football at the University of Minnesota was on October 30, 1878 in the Ariel, the student newspaper at the time. It said that "Football has been the all-absorbing amusement for the past few weeks". However, in those days, the only games played were against other Minnesota students.

Minnesota's first intercollegiate game which has its results recorded took place at the King's Fair Ground on September 30, 1882, though some secondary sources may incorrectly give the location as the Minnesota State Fairgrounds and the date as September 29, 1882. It was scheduled to be a three team track meet with the University of Minnesota, Carleton College and Hamline University competing. The team from Carleton College was unable to attend, so the other two teams went on with the meet without them. Following the meet, the athletes from Hamline wanted to go home, but were talked into playing a game of football first. A.J. Baldwin, the team captain, was the first Minnesota player to score in an intercollegiate game, leading his team to a 4–0 victory.

According to the Ariel, "It is only fair to say that the Hamlines did not have their full strength and the University won by two goals in fifty-five minutes. This ended the day and the crowd dispersed well satisfied with the beginning which had been made in intercollegiate sports." The teams had a rematch a couple of weeks later which was won by Hamline.

== Schedule ==
Date	Opponent	Site	Result
September 30	vs. Hamline	King's Fair Ground; Minneapolis, MN	W 4–0
October 16	vs. Hamline	Saint Paul, MN	L 0–2
