= 1882 Northwestern Purple football team =

American college football team

1882 Northwestern Purple football
- Conference: Independent
- Record: 1–1
- Head coach: None
- Captain: None

1882 college football records
	Conf.			Overall
Team	W	L	T	W		L		T
Yale		–		8	–	0	–	0
Colorado College		–		1	–	0	–	0
Navy		–		1	–	0	–	0
Richmond		–		1	–	0	–	0
Harvard		–		7	–	1	–	0
Fordham		–		7	–	1	–	0
Princeton		–		7	–	2	–	0
Wesleyan		–		3	–	1	–	0
Rutgers		–		6	–	4	–	0
Columbian University		–		0	–	0	–	1
Dartmouth		–		1	–	1	–	0
Lake Forest		–		1	–	1	–	0
Minnesota		–		1	–	1	–	0
Northwestern		–		1	–	1	–	0
Stevens		–		1	–	1	–	1
Amherst		–		2	–	3	–	0
Penn		–		2	–	4	–	0
CCNY		–		1	–	2	–	0
Boston Tech		–		1	–	4	–	0
Randolph–Macon		–		0	–	1	–	0
Clifton AC		–		0	–	1	–	0
Lafayette		–		0	–	2	–	0
McGill		–		0	–	2	–	0
NYU		–		0	–	2	–	0
Massachusetts		–		0	–	3	–	0
Columbia		–		0	–	5	–	0

The 1882 Northwestern Purple football team was an American football team that represented Northwestern University during the 1882 college football season. The Northwestern team played its first intercollegiate football game against Lake Forest College on November 11, 1882. Northwestern lost after giving up one goal from touchdown, two touchdowns, and two "safety touchdowns." In a rematch played one week later between the same teams, Northwestern recorded its first intercollegiate football victory with two touchdowns and one goal from touchdown.

== Schedule ==
Date	Opponent	Site	Result	Source
November 11	Lake Forest	Evanston, IL	L 0–1	
November 18	Lake Forest		W 1–0	
