= C. M. Hazen =

American football player and coach (1866–1952)

Biographical details
- Born: March 13, 1866; Prattville, Alabama, U.S.
- Died: April 22, 1952 (aged 86); Bon Air, Virginia, U.S.
- Education: University of Richmond (B.A., 1887)

Playing career
- 1882: Richmond
- 1889: Richmond
- 1892: Richmond
- 1894: Richmond

Coaching career (HC unless noted)
- 1882–1886: Richmond
- 1888: Richmond

Head coaching record
- Overall: 4–4

Charles Morse Hazen (March 13, 1866 – April 22, 1952) was an American college football coach. He was the second head football coach at Richmond College—now known as the University of Richmond—serving for four seasons between 1882 and 1888 and compiling a record of 4–4. He was described in an 1889 publication as "virtually the father of physical culture at Richmond College."

Hazen died at a nursing home in 1952.

== Head coaching record ==
Year	Team	Overall	Conference	Standing	Bowl/playoffs
Richmond Colts (Independent) (1882–1886)
1882	Richmond	1–0			
1883	No team				
1884	No team				
1885	Richmond	1–1			
1886	Richmond	1–1			
Richmond Colts (Independent) (1888)
1888	Richmond	1–2			
Richmond:		4–4			
Total:		4–4			
