= 1882 Penn Quakers football team =

American college football season

1882 Penn Quakers football
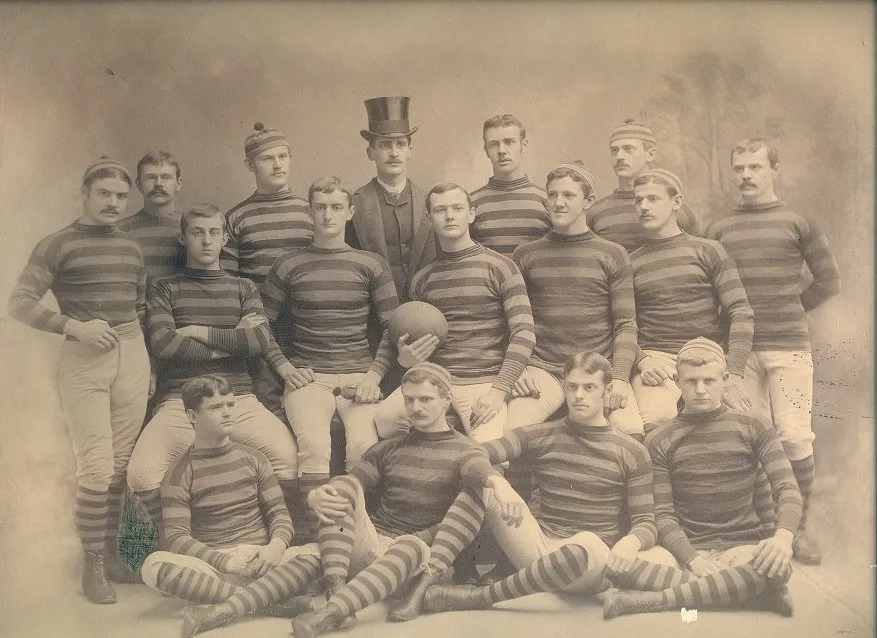
- Conference: Independent
- Record: 2–4
- Head coach: None
- Captain: Alexander Gray
- Home stadium: Recreation Park

1882 college football records
| | Conf. | | | Overall |
| Team | W | L | T | W | | L | | T |
|---|---|---|---|---|---|---|---|---|
| Yale | | – | | 8 | – | 0 | – | 0 |
| Colorado College | | – | | 1 | – | 0 | – | 0 |
| Navy | | – | | 1 | – | 0 | – | 0 |
| Richmond | | – | | 1 | – | 0 | – | 0 |
| Harvard | | – | | 7 | – | 1 | – | 0 |
| Fordham | | – | | 7 | – | 1 | – | 0 |
| Princeton | | – | | 7 | – | 2 | – | 0 |
| Wesleyan | | – | | 3 | – | 1 | – | 0 |
| Rutgers | | – | | 6 | – | 4 | – | 0 |
| Columbian University | | – | | 0 | – | 0 | – | 1 |
| Dartmouth | | – | | 1 | – | 1 | – | 0 |
| Lake Forest | | – | | 1 | – | 1 | – | 0 |
| Minnesota | | – | | 1 | – | 1 | – | 0 |
| Northwestern | | – | | 1 | – | 1 | – | 0 |
| Stevens | | – | | 1 | – | 1 | – | 1 |
| Amherst | | – | | 2 | – | 3 | – | 0 |
| Penn | | – | | 2 | – | 4 | – | 0 |
| CCNY | | – | | 1 | – | 2 | – | 0 |
| MIT | | – | | 1 | – | 4 | – | 0 |
| Randolph–Macon | | – | | 0 | – | 1 | – | 0 |
| Clifton AC | | – | | 0 | – | 1 | – | 0 |
| Lafayette | | – | | 0 | – | 2 | – | 0 |
| McGill | | – | | 0 | – | 2 | – | 0 |
| NYU | | – | | 0 | – | 2 | – | 0 |
| Massachusetts | | – | | 0 | – | 3 | – | 0 |
| Columbia | | – | | 0 | – | 5 | – | 0 |

The 1882 Penn Quakers football team represented the University of Pennsylvania in the 1882 college football season. The team finished with a 2–4 record.

== Schedule ==
| Date | Time | Opponent | Site | Result | Source |
|---|---|---|---|---|---|
| October 14 | | Philadelphia Crescent AC | Philadelphia, PA | W 5–0 | |
| October 28 | | at Princeton | Princeton, NJ (rivalry) | L 0–8 | |
| November 4 | | Rutgers | Recreation Park; Philadelphia, PA | L 1–3 | |
| November 11 | 2:50 p.m. | Princeton | Recreation Park; Philadelphia, PA | L 0–10 | |
| November 18 | | at Rutgers | New Brunswick, NJ | L 0–1 | |
| November 25 | | at Lafayette | Easton, PA | W 1–0 | |
