= Louis K. Hull =

American football player, lawyer, and businessman (1861–1931)

Yale Bulldogs
- Positions: Rusher, forward

Personal information
- Born: November 9, 1861; Lebanon, Connecticut, U.S.
- Died: November 22, 1931 (aged 70); Minneapolis, Minnesota, U.S.

Career information
- College: Yale (1878–1883)

Awards and highlights
- National championship (1879, 1880, 1881, 1882, 1883)

Louis Kossuth Hull (November 9, 1861–November 22, 1931) was an American football player, lawyer, and businessman.

Born in Lebanon, Connecticut, Hull attended Yale College, graduating in 1883. He was the captain of the Yale rowing crew, a rusher on the football team, and a member of Skull and Bones. He was credited with receiving more athletic letters than any other Yale student. He played as a forward and rusher for the Yale football team for six years from 1878 to 1883. He was a member of the undefeated 1879, 1880, 1881, 1882, and 1883 Yale Bulldogs football teams that have been recognized for winning five consecutive national championships.

After graduating from Yale, he began practicing law in Minneapolis in 1887. He became president of Southern Minnesota Lumber Company.

Hull married Agnes McNair. They had a daughter, Ruth. Hull died of a heart attack in 1931 at age 70.
