= 1882 Lake Forest football team =

American college football season

1882 Lake Forest football
- Conference: Independent
- Record: 1–1
- Head coach: None

1882 college football records
| | Conf. | | | Overall |
| Team | W | L | T | W | | L | | T |
|---|---|---|---|---|---|---|---|---|
| Yale | | – | | 8 | – | 0 | – | 0 |
| Colorado College | | – | | 1 | – | 0 | – | 0 |
| Navy | | – | | 1 | – | 0 | – | 0 |
| Richmond | | – | | 1 | – | 0 | – | 0 |
| Harvard | | – | | 7 | – | 1 | – | 0 |
| Fordham | | – | | 7 | – | 1 | – | 0 |
| Princeton | | – | | 7 | – | 2 | – | 0 |
| Wesleyan | | – | | 3 | – | 1 | – | 0 |
| Rutgers | | – | | 6 | – | 4 | – | 0 |
| Columbian University | | – | | 0 | – | 0 | – | 1 |
| Dartmouth | | – | | 1 | – | 1 | – | 0 |
| Lake Forest | | – | | 1 | – | 1 | – | 0 |
| Minnesota | | – | | 1 | – | 1 | – | 0 |
| Northwestern | | – | | 1 | – | 1 | – | 0 |
| Stevens | | – | | 1 | – | 1 | – | 1 |
| Amherst | | – | | 2 | – | 3 | – | 0 |
| Penn | | – | | 2 | – | 4 | – | 0 |
| CCNY | | – | | 1 | – | 2 | – | 0 |
| MIT | | – | | 1 | – | 4 | – | 0 |
| Randolph–Macon | | – | | 0 | – | 1 | – | 0 |
| Clifton AC | | – | | 0 | – | 1 | – | 0 |
| Lafayette | | – | | 0 | – | 2 | – | 0 |
| McGill | | – | | 0 | – | 2 | – | 0 |
| NYU | | – | | 0 | – | 2 | – | 0 |
| Massachusetts | | – | | 0 | – | 3 | – | 0 |
| Columbia | | – | | 0 | – | 5 | – | 0 |

The 1882 Lake Forest football team represented Lake Forest College during the 1882 college football season.

== Schedule ==
| Date | Opponent | Site | Result | Source |
|---|---|---|---|---|
| November 11 | at Northwestern | Evanston, IL | W 1–0 | |
| November 18 | Northwestern | | L 1–0 | |
