= 1889 Delaware football team =

American college football season

1889 Delaware football
- Conference: Independent
- Record: 1–1–1
- Head coach: None

1889 Southern college football independents records
	Conf.			Overall
Team	W	L	T	W		L		T
Trinity (NC)		–		2	–	0	–	0
Georgetown		–		5	–	1	–	0
Navy		–		4	–	1	–	1
Virginia		–		4	–	2	–	0
Wake Forest		–		2	–	2	–	0
North Carolina		–		1	–	1	–	0
Delaware		–		1	–	1	–	1
Johns Hopkins		–		2	–	4	–	1
Richmond		–		1	–	2	–	0
Dover Conference Academy		–		0	–	2	–	1
Furman		–		0	–	2	–	0

The 1889 Delaware football team represented Delaware College—now known as the University of Delaware—as an independent during the 1889 college football season.

== Schedule ==
Date	Opponent	Site	Result	Source
October 26	at Del. Field Club of Wilmington	Wilmington, DE	L 0–74	
November 26	Warren Athletic Club of Wilmington		W 30–0	
December 7	Dover Conference Academy Athletic Club	Newark, DE	T 0–0	
