= 1882 Lafayette football team =

American college football season

1882 Lafayette football
- Conference: Independent
- Record: 0–2
- Head coach: None
- Captain: Henry Craven

1882 college football records
	Conf.			Overall
Team	W	L	T	W		L		T
Yale		–		8	–	0	–	0
Colorado College		–		1	–	0	–	0
Navy		–		1	–	0	–	0
Richmond		–		1	–	0	–	0
Harvard		–		7	–	1	–	0
Fordham		–		7	–	1	–	0
Princeton		–		7	–	2	–	0
Wesleyan		–		3	–	1	–	0
Rutgers		–		6	–	4	–	0
Columbian University		–		0	–	0	–	1
Dartmouth		–		1	–	1	–	0
Lake Forest		–		1	–	1	–	0
Minnesota		–		1	–	1	–	0
Northwestern		–		1	–	1	–	0
Stevens		–		1	–	1	–	1
Amherst		–		2	–	3	–	0
Penn		–		2	–	4	–	0
CCNY		–		1	–	2	–	0
MIT		–		1	–	4	–	0
Randolph–Macon		–		0	–	1	–	0
Clifton AC		–		0	–	1	–	0
Lafayette		–		0	–	2	–	0
McGill		–		0	–	2	–	0
NYU		–		0	–	2	–	0
Massachusetts		–		0	–	3	–	0
Columbia		–		0	–	5	–	0

The 1882 Lafayette football team was an American football team that represented Lafayette College as an independent during the 1882 college football season. The team was the first to play intercollegiate football for Lafayette, compiling an 0–2 record. Henry Craven was the team captain, and W. R. Wilson was the manager.

In the first game of the season, 1882 Rutgers Queensmen football teamscored eight touchdowns and no goals; Lafayette scored three touchdowns and no goals.

In the second game, Lafayette lost to Penn.

== Schedule ==
Date	Opponent	Site	Result	Source
November 7	at Rutgers	New Brunswick, NJ	L 0–8	
November 25	Penn	Easton, PA	L 0–1	
