= 1889 North Carolina Tar Heels football team =

American college football season

1889 North Carolina Tar Heels football
- Conference: North Carolina Inter-Collegiate Football Association
- Record: 1–1 (1–1 NCIFA)
- Head coach: None
- Captains: Lacy Little; Steve Bragaw
- Home stadium: Campus Athletic Field (I)

1889 Southern college football independents records
	Conf.			Overall
Team	W	L	T	W		L		T
Trinity (NC)		–		2	–	0	–	0
Georgetown		–		5	–	1	–	0
Navy		–		4	–	1	–	1
Virginia		–		4	–	2	–	0
Wake Forest		–		2	–	2	–	0
North Carolina		–		1	–	1	–	0
Delaware		–		1	–	1	–	1
Johns Hopkins		–		2	–	4	–	1
Richmond		–		1	–	2	–	0
Dover Conference Academy		–		0	–	2	–	1
Furman		–		0	–	2	–	0

The 1889 North Carolina Tar Heels football team represented the University of North Carolina in the 1889 college football season. They scheduled two games with a final record of 1–1. The team captains for the 1889 season were Lacy Little and Steve Bragaw. After the University banned football there were no games in 1890. Football was reinstated in 1891 and a coach (William P. Graves) was hired. Although a game was scheduled in February, it was canceled and games would not resume until the next academic year.

== Schedule ==
Date	Opponent	Site	Result	Source
November 15	Trinity (NC)	Chapel Hill, NC (rivalry)	W (by forfeit)	
November 22	Wake Forest	Campus Athletic Field (I); Chapel Hill, NC (rivalry)	L 8–18	
