= 1882 Boston Tech football team =

American college football season

1882 Boston Tech football
- Conference: Independent
- Record: 1–4
- Head coach: None

1882 college football records
	Conf.			Overall
Team	W	L	T	W		L		T
Yale		–		8	–	0	–	0
Colorado College		–		1	–	0	–	0
Navy		–		1	–	0	–	0
Richmond		–		1	–	0	–	0
Harvard		–		7	–	1	–	0
Fordham		–		7	–	1	–	0
Princeton		–		7	–	2	–	0
Wesleyan		–		3	–	1	–	0
Rutgers		–		6	–	4	–	0
Columbian University		–		0	–	0	–	1
Dartmouth		–		1	–	1	–	0
Lake Forest		–		1	–	1	–	0
Minnesota		–		1	–	1	–	0
Northwestern		–		1	–	1	–	0
Stevens		–		1	–	1	–	1
Amherst		–		2	–	3	–	0
Penn		–		2	–	4	–	0
CCNY		–		1	–	2	–	0
Boston Tech		–		1	–	4	–	0
Randolph–Macon		–		0	–	1	–	0
Clifton AC		–		0	–	1	–	0
Lafayette		–		0	–	2	–	0
McGill		–		0	–	2	–	0
NYU		–		0	–	2	–	0
Massachusetts		–		0	–	3	–	0
Columbia		–		0	–	5	–	0

The 1882 Boston Tech football team represented Boston Tech—now known as the Massachusetts Institute of Technology (MIT)—during the 1882 college football season. The team compiled a 1–4 record.

== Schedule ==
Date	Opponent	Site	Result	Source
October 11	at Harvard	Holmes Field; Cambridge, MA	L 0–1	
October 25	at Harvard	Holmes Field; Cambridge, MA	L 0–3	
November 4	at Yale	Hamilton Park; New Haven, CT	L 0–6	
