= 1882 Navy Midshipmen football team =

American college football season

1882 Navy Midshipmen football
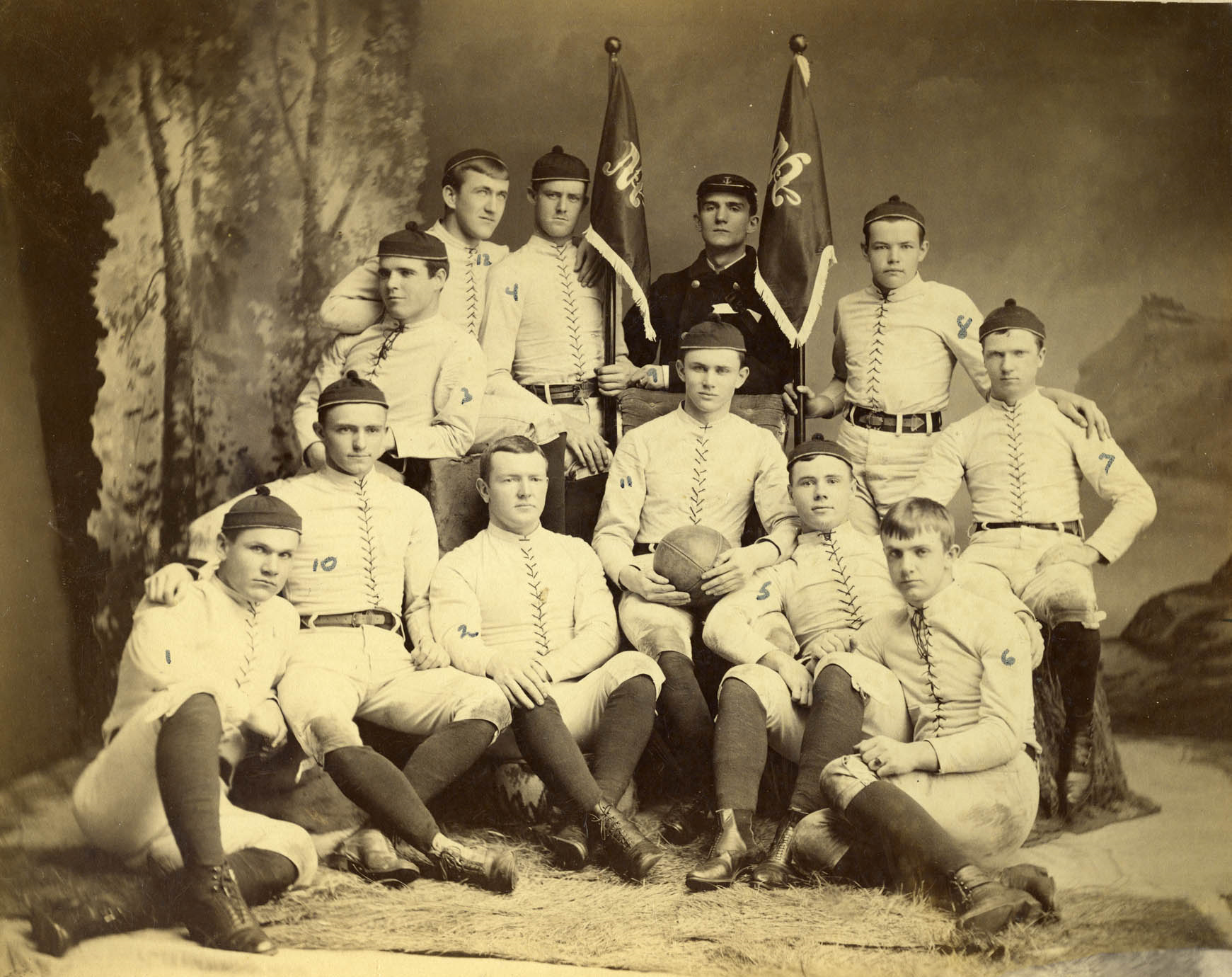
- Conference: Independent
- Record: 1–0
- Head coach: Vaulx Carter (1st season)
- Captain: Alex Jackson
- Home stadium: Western King Field

1882 college football records
	Conf.			Overall
Team	W	L	T	W		L		T
Yale		–		8	–	0	–	0
Colorado College		–		1	–	0	–	0
Navy		–		1	–	0	–	0
Richmond		–		1	–	0	–	0
Harvard		–		7	–	1	–	0
Fordham		–		7	–	1	–	0
Princeton		–		7	–	2	–	0
Wesleyan		–		3	–	1	–	0
Rutgers		–		6	–	4	–	0
Columbian University		–		0	–	0	–	1
Dartmouth		–		1	–	1	–	0
Lake Forest		–		1	–	1	–	0
Minnesota		–		1	–	1	–	0
Northwestern		–		1	–	1	–	0
Stevens		–		1	–	1	–	1
Amherst		–		2	–	3	–	0
Penn		–		2	–	4	–	0
CCNY		–		1	–	2	–	0
Boston Tech		–		1	–	4	–	0
Randolph–Macon		–		0	–	1	–	0
Clifton AC		–		0	–	1	–	0
Lafayette		–		0	–	2	–	0
McGill		–		0	–	2	–	0
NYU		–		0	–	2	–	0
Massachusetts		–		0	–	3	–	0
Columbia		–		0	–	5	–	0

The 1882 Navy Midshipmen football team represented the United States Naval Academy in the 1882 college football season. The team was the second intercollegiate football squad to represent the United States Naval Academy, and the first since 1879. The team was coached by player-coach Vaulx Carter, and was entirely student-operated. It was captained by squad member Alex Jackson. The team played just a single game, an 8 to 0 (8–0) shutout of Johns Hopkins, which was the school's first ever win. The squad was entirely student operated, and was not supported by the Naval Academy's faculty. The season would mark the beginning of eight season rivalry between the Midshipmen and Johns Hopkins.

== Schedule ==
Date	Opponent	Site	Result	Attendance
November 30	Clifton Athletic Club	Unknown (Note: The game was most likely played on an unused drill or parade field.); Annapolis, MD (rivalry)	W 8–0	(Note: No records exist to provide attendance figures for the game)

== Prelude ==
It is widely believed by football researchers that the playing of intercollegiate football began in November 1869, when a player at Rutgers University challenged another player at the nearby College of New Jersey (now Princeton). The contest more closely resembled soccer, with teams scoring by kicking the ball into the opponent's net, and lacked a uniform rules structure. The game developed slowly; the first rules were drafted in October 1873, and only consisted of twelve guidelines. Even though the number of teams participating in the sport increased, the game was still effectively controlled by the College of New Jersey, who claimed eight national championships in ten years. Only Yale presented any form of challenge, claiming four national championships in the same time period.

The Naval Academy's first ever football team was fielded in 1879. The squad was entirely student-operated, receiving no official support from Naval Academy officials. The team was entirely funded by its members and their fellow students. This would continue until 1892, when that season's team was led by coach Ben Crosby. The 1879 team participated in just one game, which resulted in a scoreless tie. It was played against the Baltimore Athletic Club, at most likely an unused drill field on the Naval Academy campus. Navy would not field a football team in 1880 or 1881, likely due to the lack of support.

== Season summary ==
=== Navy 8, Johns Hopkins 0 ===
The 1882 season began when second-year cadet Vaulx Carter formed a team, which he led as both a player and the coach. Alex Jackson was appointed captain of the squad. Carter scheduled a single game for the season, which was played on Thanksgiving Day against the Baltimore-based Clifton Football Club. The Clifton team was made up of players from Johns Hopkins University, who were unable to play for their school due to their administrator's negative views towards the sport. Navy's team itself played without official permission; the first year the team received approval was in 1885, when, according to Morris Allison Bealle, "some of the faculty actually gave in and admitted that football might, at that, be or become an interesting diversion".

It snowed heavily before the game, to the point where players for both teams had to clear layers of snow off of the field, making large piles of snow along the sides of the playing ground. The field was 110 yards by 53 yards, with goalposts 25 feet (7.6 m) apart and 20 feet (6.1 m) high. The first half of the game went scoreless; the Baltimore American reported that "the visitors pushed Navy every place but over the goal line in the first half". During play, the ball was kicked over the seawall a number of times, once going so far out it had to be retrieved by boat before play could continue. The American described the second half in detail:

After ten minutes interval the ball was again put in play, this time being kicked off by the Cliftons. The rest period had apparently stiffened the Cliftons, for the Academy making a vigorous spurt got the ball thru them, and Street, following it up well, scored a touchdown for the Academy.

The try at goal failed, but the ball, instead of going to the Cliftons behind the line, fell into the field and into the hands of one of the Academy team. By a quick decisive run, he again got the ball over the Cliftons goal line and scored a touchdown.

Cadet George Washington Street, of Wisconsin, was identified as the first person to score a touchdown for the Naval Academy. The Baltimore Sun stated that William Abrose O'Malley, of Pennsylvania, was the cadet who caught Street's blocked kick and scored the second touchdown. The Sun also covered, in detail, the uniforms the squads wore; Johns Hopkins sported blue, black, and white striped uniforms, while the Naval Academy wore maroon and white uniforms. Both teams also nailed strips of leather to the bottom of their shoes to help deal with slipping.

== Players and coaching staff ==
=== Players ===
The 1882 Naval Academy team was made up of eleven players at five different positions. The squad consisted of four rushers, two ends, two tackles, two guards, and a center:

Rushers

- Alex Jackson (capt.)
- Vaulx Carter
- William O'Malley
- Julius Dashiell

Ends

- Frank Hill
- Ned Tilden

Guards

- James Kitrell
- Jim O'Leary

Tackles

- Tremlet Toney
- Foxhall "Kid" Parker

Center

- George Washington Street

=== Coaching staff ===
Vaulx Carter took on coaching duties for the 1882 team. He was the academy's first coach; it was not until a decade later, in 1892, when Ben Crosby was hired as the school's next coach. The squad also appointed an official umpire, the only time it would ever do so. Its three staff members were:

Head coach

- Vaulx Carter

Manager

- Elton Dalrymple

Umpire

- Allen McLain

== Postseason and aftermath ==
The first postseason college football game would not be played until 1902, with the Pasadena Tournament of Roses' establishment of the east–west tournament game, later known as the Rose Bowl. The Midshipmen would not participate in their first Rose Bowl until the 1923 season, when they went 5–1–2 and tied with the Washington Huskies 14–14 in the match. As a result of the lack of a competition, there were no postseason games played after the 1882 season. According to statistics compiled by the National Championship Foundation, Parke Davis, and the Billingsley college football research center, Yale was declared the 1882 season champion, giving them their eighth championship overall.

The Midshipmen's win was the first in school history, and continued the team's shutout streak. They would lose their only game in the 1883 season, ending the consecutive shutouts, and the Naval Academy would not get another shutout until the 1886 season, when they defeated Johns Hopkins 6–0. The 1882 season also marked the start of an eight-season long rivalry with Johns Hopkins, which Navy would win, five games to four. The team would not have another coach until the 1892 season, when Ben Crosby was hired to lead. Navy would finish the 1880s with four winning seasons, and an overall record of 14–12–2. The squad would outscore their opponents 292–231, and would finish the 19th century with an overall record of 54–19–3.

== See also ==
- List of the first college football game in each US state
