= 1882 Columbia football team =

American college football season

1882 Columbia football
- Conference: Independent
- Record: 0–5
- Head coach: None
- Captain: B. P. Clark
- Home stadium: Polo Grounds

1882 college football records
| | Conf. | | | Overall |
| Team | W | L | T | W | | L | | T |
|---|---|---|---|---|---|---|---|---|
| Yale | | – | | 8 | – | 0 | – | 0 |
| Colorado College | | – | | 1 | – | 0 | – | 0 |
| Navy | | – | | 1 | – | 0 | – | 0 |
| Richmond | | – | | 1 | – | 0 | – | 0 |
| Harvard | | – | | 7 | – | 1 | – | 0 |
| Fordham | | – | | 7 | – | 1 | – | 0 |
| Princeton | | – | | 7 | – | 2 | – | 0 |
| Wesleyan | | – | | 3 | – | 1 | – | 0 |
| Rutgers | | – | | 6 | – | 4 | – | 0 |
| Columbian University | | – | | 0 | – | 0 | – | 1 |
| Dartmouth | | – | | 1 | – | 1 | – | 0 |
| Lake Forest | | – | | 1 | – | 1 | – | 0 |
| Minnesota | | – | | 1 | – | 1 | – | 0 |
| Northwestern | | – | | 1 | – | 1 | – | 0 |
| Stevens | | – | | 1 | – | 1 | – | 1 |
| Amherst | | – | | 2 | – | 3 | – | 0 |
| Penn | | – | | 2 | – | 4 | – | 0 |
| CCNY | | – | | 1 | – | 2 | – | 0 |
| MIT | | – | | 1 | – | 4 | – | 0 |
| Randolph–Macon | | – | | 0 | – | 1 | – | 0 |
| Clifton AC | | – | | 0 | – | 1 | – | 0 |
| Lafayette | | – | | 0 | – | 2 | – | 0 |
| McGill | | – | | 0 | – | 2 | – | 0 |
| NYU | | – | | 0 | – | 2 | – | 0 |
| Massachusetts | | – | | 0 | – | 3 | – | 0 |
| Columbia | | – | | 0 | – | 5 | – | 0 |

The 1882 Columbia football team represented Columbia University in the 1882 college football season. The team had no head coach, and compiled a record of 0–5. B. P. Clark served as team captain.

== Schedule ==
| Date | Opponent | Site | Result | Attendance | Source |
|---|---|---|---|---|---|
| November 7 | Princeton | Polo Grounds; New York, NY | L 0–8 | | |
| November 9 | at Rutgers | New Brunswick, NJ | L 0–2 | | |
| November 11 | vs. Harvard | St. George's Cricket Club grounds; Hoboken, NJ | L 0–2 | | |
| November 18 | at Yale | Hamilton Park; New Haven, CT | L 0–11 | 600 | |
| November 25 | at Princeton | Princeton, NJ | L 0–3 | | |
