= 1882 Clifton Athletic Club football team =

American college football season

1882 Clifton Athletic Club football
- Conference: Independent
- Record: 0–2
- Head coach: None
- Home stadium: Druid Hill Park

1882 college football records
	Conf.			Overall
Team	W	L	T	W		L		T
Yale		–		8	–	0	–	0
Colorado College		–		1	–	0	–	0
Navy		–		1	–	0	–	0
Richmond		–		1	–	0	–	0
Harvard		–		7	–	1	–	0
Fordham		–		7	–	1	–	0
Princeton		–		7	–	2	–	0
Wesleyan		–		3	–	1	–	0
Rutgers		–		6	–	4	–	0
Columbian University		–		0	–	0	–	1
Dartmouth		–		1	–	1	–	0
Lake Forest		–		1	–	1	–	0
Minnesota		–		1	–	1	–	0
Northwestern		–		1	–	1	–	0
Stevens		–		1	–	1	–	1
Amherst		–		2	–	3	–	0
Penn		–		2	–	4	–	0
CCNY		–		1	–	2	–	0
MIT		–		1	–	4	–	0
Randolph–Macon		–		0	–	1	–	0
Clifton AC		–		0	–	1	–	0
Lafayette		–		0	–	2	–	0
McGill		–		0	–	2	–	0
NYU		–		0	–	2	–	0
Massachusetts		–		0	–	3	–	0
Columbia		–		0	–	5	–	0

The 1882 Clifton Athletic Club football team represented Johns Hopkins University in the sport of American football during the 1882 college football season. Hopkins' first team was assembled in 1881, and spent an entire year training and learning a version of the game. Their sport, which was closer to rugby, was played in Druid Hill Park. After the training, the team planned a two-game 1882 season. The squad had to play the season under the title of the Clifton Athletic Club, due to the school's policy on the sport of football. The first was a practice game with the Baltimore Athletic Club, played on October 7. The Hopkins team lost the contest 4–0. The following game was their first true game, to be played against the Naval Academy.

Cadet Vaulx Carter reintroduced football to the United States Naval Academy. Acting as both a player and a coach, Carter procured a single game for the Academy to play. The team challenged the Baltimore-based Clifton Athletic Club to a game during the Academy's Thanksgiving Day athletic carnival. The Clifton team was actually made up of players from Johns Hopkins, who were unable to play as their school due to the institution's harsh opinion on football.

== Schedule ==
Date	Opponent	Site	Result
October 7	Baltimore A. C.	Baltimore, MD	L 0–4
November 30	at Navy	Annapolis, MD (Rivalry)	L 0–8

== Navy game ==
The game began in heat and discussion and ended in quarrel and wrangle. At one point matters grew so hot that the Hopkins team was about to stop playing. The Hopkins team had the skill and light weight; the Academy team the endurance and muscle. Paul Dashiell (of Hopkins) kept up his reputation as a fine player, one of his feats being a standing leap over the heads of the Cadet rush line.

— The Baltimore American, describing the 1883 contest in a short article.

It snowed heavily before the game, to the point where players for both teams had to clear layers of snow off of the field, making large piles of snow along the sides of the playing ground. The field was 110 yards by 53 yards, with goalposts 25 feet (7.6 m) apart and 20 feet (6.1 m) high. The first half of the game went scoreless; the Baltimore American reported that "the visitors pushed Navy every place but over the goal line in the first half". During play, the ball was kicked over the seawall a number of times, once going so far out it had to be retrieved by boat before play could continue. The American described the second half in detail:

After ten minutes interval the ball was again put in play, this time being kicked off by the Cliftons. The rest period had apparently stiffened the Cliftons, for the Academy making a vigorous spurt got the ball thru them, and Street, following it up well, scored a touchdown for the Academy.

The try at goal failed, but the ball, instead of going to the Cliftons behind the line, fell into the field and into the hands of one of the Academy team. By a quick decisive run, he again got the ball over the Cliftons goal line and scored a touchdown.

Cadet George Washington Street was identified as the first person to score a touchdown for the Naval Academy. The Baltimore Sun stated that William Abrose O'Malley was the cadet who caught Street's blocked kick and scored the second touchdown. The Sun also covered, in detail, the uniforms the squads wore; Johns Hopkins sported black and light blue striped jerseys and caps, with white pants and blue socks. The Naval Academy wore maroon socks, caps, and belts, with white pants and jerseys. Both teams also nailed strips of leather to the bottom of their shoes to help deal with slipping.

== See also ==
- Johns Hopkins–Navy football rivalry
