= 1889 Trinity Blue and White football team =

American college football season

1889 Trinity Blue and White football
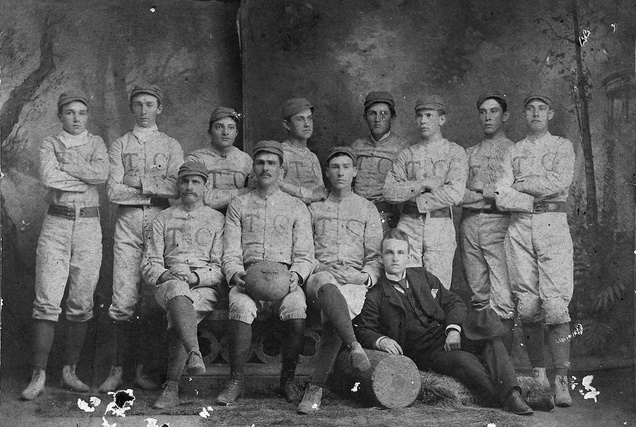
- Conference: Independent
- Record: 2–0
- Head coach: John Franklin Crowell (2nd season)
- Captain: S. J. Durham

1889 Southern college football independents records
	Conf.			Overall
Team	W	L	T	W		L		T
Trinity (NC)		–		2	–	0	–	0
Georgetown		–		5	–	1	–	0
Navy		–		4	–	1	–	1
Virginia		–		4	–	2	–	0
Wake Forest		–		2	–	2	–	0
North Carolina		–		1	–	1	–	0
Delaware		–		1	–	1	–	1
Johns Hopkins		–		2	–	4	–	1
Richmond		–		1	–	2	–	0
Dover Conference Academy		–		0	–	2	–	1
Furman		–		0	–	2	–	0

The 1889 Trinity Blue and White football team represented Trinity College (today known as Duke University) in the 1889 college football season. The game with rival North Carolina is still disputed, with both teams claiming a home win by forfeit.

== Schedule ==
Date	Time	Opponent	Site	Result	Source
November 15		North Carolina	Durham, NC (rivalry)	W forfeit	
November 28	3:00 p.m.	vs. Wake Forest	Athletic Park; Raleigh, NC	W 8–4	
