= 1882 Harvard Crimson football team =

American college football season

1882 Harvard Crimson football
- Conference: Independent
- Record: 8–1
- Head coach: None
- Home stadium: Holmes Field

1882 college football records
	Conf.			Overall
Team	W	L	T	W		L		T
Yale		–		8	–	0	–	0
Colorado College		–		1	–	0	–	0
Navy		–		1	–	0	–	0
Richmond		–		1	–	0	–	0
Harvard		–		7	–	1	–	0
Fordham		–		7	–	1	–	0
Princeton		–		7	–	2	–	0
Wesleyan		–		3	–	1	–	0
Rutgers		–		6	–	4	–	0
Columbian University		–		0	–	0	–	1
Dartmouth		–		1	–	1	–	0
Lake Forest		–		1	–	1	–	0
Minnesota		–		1	–	1	–	0
Northwestern		–		1	–	1	–	0
Stevens		–		1	–	1	–	1
Amherst		–		2	–	3	–	0
Penn		–		2	–	4	–	0
CCNY		–		1	–	2	–	0
Boston Tech		–		1	–	4	–	0
Randolph–Macon		–		0	–	1	–	0
Clifton AC		–		0	–	1	–	0
Lafayette		–		0	–	2	–	0
McGill		–		0	–	2	–	0
NYU		–		0	–	2	–	0
Massachusetts		–		0	–	3	–	0
Columbia		–		0	–	5	–	0

The 1882 Harvard Crimson football team represented Harvard University in the 1882 college football season. They finished with an 8–1 record.

== Schedule ==
Date	Time	Opponent	Site	Result	Source
October 11		Boston Tech	Holmes Field; Cambridge, MA	W 1–0	
October 21		Harvard alumni	Holmes Field; Cambridge, MA	W 1–0	
October 25		Boston Tech	Holmes Field; Cambridge, MA	W 3–0	
October 30		McGill	Holmes Field; Cambridge, MA	W 2–0	
November 4	2:40 p.m.	at Amherst	Amherst, MA	W 1–0	
November 9		Dartmouth	Cambridge, MA (rivalry)	W 4–0	
November 11		vs. Columbia	St. George Cricket Club grounds; Hoboken, NJ	W 2–0	
November 18		Princeton	Holmes Field, Cambridge, MA (rivalry)	W 2–1	
November 25		Yale	Holmes Field; Cambridge, MA (rivalry)	L 0–1	
