= 1882 Rutgers Queensmen football team =

American college football season

1882 Rutgers Queensmen football
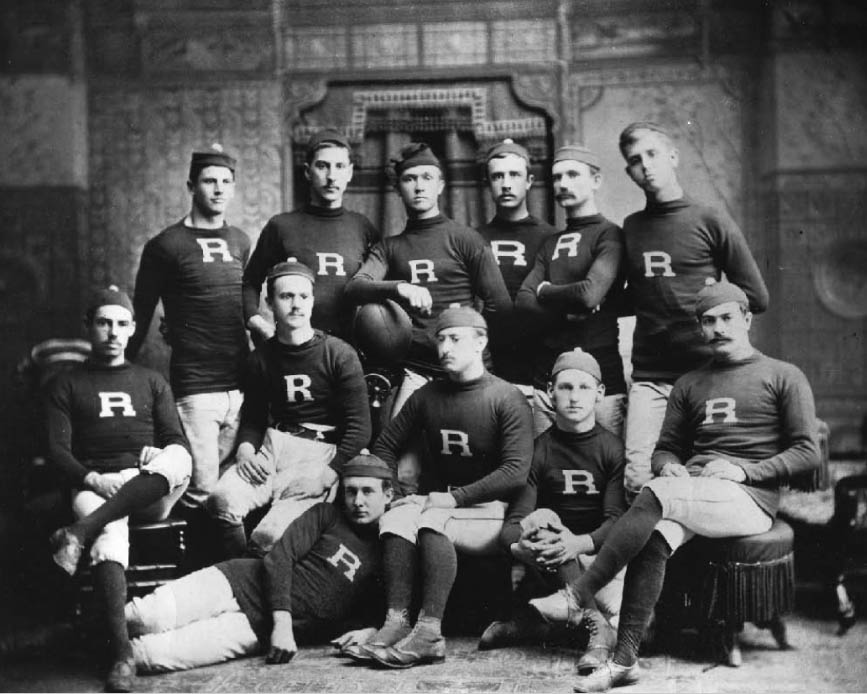
- Conference: Independent
- Record: 6–4
- Head coach: None
- Captain: William J. Chamberlain
- Home stadium: College Field

1882 college football records
	Conf.			Overall
Team	W	L	T	W		L		T
Yale		–		8	–	0	–	0
Colorado College		–		1	–	0	–	0
Navy		–		1	–	0	–	0
Richmond		–		1	–	0	–	0
Harvard		–		7	–	1	–	0
Fordham		–		7	–	1	–	0
Princeton		–		7	–	2	–	0
Wesleyan		–		3	–	1	–	0
Rutgers		–		6	–	4	–	0
Columbian University		–		0	–	0	–	1
Dartmouth		–		1	–	1	–	0
Lake Forest		–		1	–	1	–	0
Minnesota		–		1	–	1	–	0
Northwestern		–		1	–	1	–	0
Stevens		–		1	–	1	–	1
Amherst		–		2	–	3	–	0
Penn		–		2	–	4	–	0
CCNY		–		1	–	2	–	0
MIT		–		1	–	4	–	0
Randolph–Macon		–		0	–	1	–	0
Clifton AC		–		0	–	1	–	0
Lafayette		–		0	–	2	–	0
McGill		–		0	–	2	–	0
NYU		–		0	–	2	–	0
Massachusetts		–		0	–	3	–	0
Columbia		–		0	–	5	–	0

The 1882 Rutgers Queensmen football team represented Rutgers University as an independent during the 1882 college football season. The Queensmen compiled a 6–4 record, scored 23 points, and allowed 23 points. The team had no coach, and its captain was William J. Chamberlain.

== Schedule ==
Date	Opponent	Site	Result	Source
October 14	at Princeton	Princeton, NJ (rivalry)	L 0–5	
October 20	CCNY	New Brunswick, NJ	W 7–0	
October 21	at Yale	Hamilton Park; New Haven, CT	L 0–9	
October 28	Yale	New Brunswick, NJ	L 0–5	
November 4	at Penn	Recreation Park; Philadelphia, PA	W 3–1	
November 7	Lafayette	New Brunswick, NJ	W 8–0	
November 9	Columbia	New Brunswick, NJ	W 2–0	
November 14	Princeton	New Brunswick, NJ	L 0–3	
November 18	Penn	New Brunswick, NJ	W 1–0	
November 24	at Stevens	Hoboken, NJ	W 2–0	
