= Wyllys Terry =

American football player and businessman

Yale Bulldogs
- Position: Rusher

Personal information
- Born: c. 1864
- Died: April 21, 1949 (age 84)

Career information
- College: Yale (1882–1884)

Awards and highlights
- National championship (1882, 1883, 1884)

Wyllys Terry (c. 1864 – April 21, 1949) was an American football player and businessman. He holds the record for the longest run from scrimmage in college football history.

== Athletic career ==
Terry was a back on the undefeated 1882, 1883, and 1884 Yale Bulldogs football teams that compiled a three-year record of 24–1–2 and have been recognized as national champions all three years. On November 5, 1884, in a 46–0 victory over Wesleyan, he set a college football record with the longest run from scrimmage in American football history. Life magazine in 1946 wrote of the run:

The longest run of all time was a 115-yard zigzag streak by Wyllys Terry, halfback on the 1884 Yale team, in one of three games played against Wesleyan that year. A run of that length was made possible by the 110-yard field, the run starting five yards behind the goal line."

The Guinness Book of Superlatives and other sources also register the length of Terry's record run at 115 yards. Other sources do not include the yardage behind the goal line and record the run at 110 yards, or 109 yards.

Terry also had an 85-yard touchdown run against Harvard in 1883. He was rated by football experts as "one of the finest runners in football history", "one of the early 'greats' of football", and "one of the most famous personalities in American sports."

He was also the middleweight and heavyweight intercollegiate boxing champion and a sparring partner of Gentleman Jim Corbett at the Crescent Athletic Club. He was also captain of the Yale baseball team.

== Later years and family ==
Terry was married in 1907 to Marie Louise Baldwin, daughter of former Michigan Governor Henry P. Baldwin.

Terry worked in the warehousing business and later still operated an insurance firm, Terry & Company, in New York City. He was the senior warden at St. Bernard's Church in Bernardsville, New Jersey. He was also a director of several companies, including the New Netherland Bank, Sterling Salt Company, Van Brunt Street and Erie Basin Railroad, Terminal Warehouse Company, and Depard and Company.

He died in 1949 at age 84 at his home on Park Avenue in Manhattan.
