= Frank Johnson (American football) =

American football player and coach

Frank Jonhnson
Biographical details
- Born: c. 1869–1870
- Died: November 30, 1890 (aged 21); Lynchburg, Virginia, U.S.

Playing career
- 1887–1890: Richmond

Coaching career (HC unless noted)
- 1889: Richmond

Head coaching record
- Overall: 1–2

Frank C. Johnson (c. 1869–1870 – November 30, 1890) was an American college football player and coach. He was the fourth head football at Richmond College—now known as the University of Richmond—in Richmond, Virginia, serving for season, in 1889 season, and compiling a record of 1–2.

Johnson died of a malaria or typhoid fever at the home of his father, a prominent jeweler, in 1890.

== Head coaching record ==
Year	Team	Overall	Conference	Standing	Bowl/playoffs
Richmond Colts (Independent) (1889)
1889	Richmond	1–2			
Richmond:		1–2			
Total:		1–2			
