= 1882 college football season =

American college football season

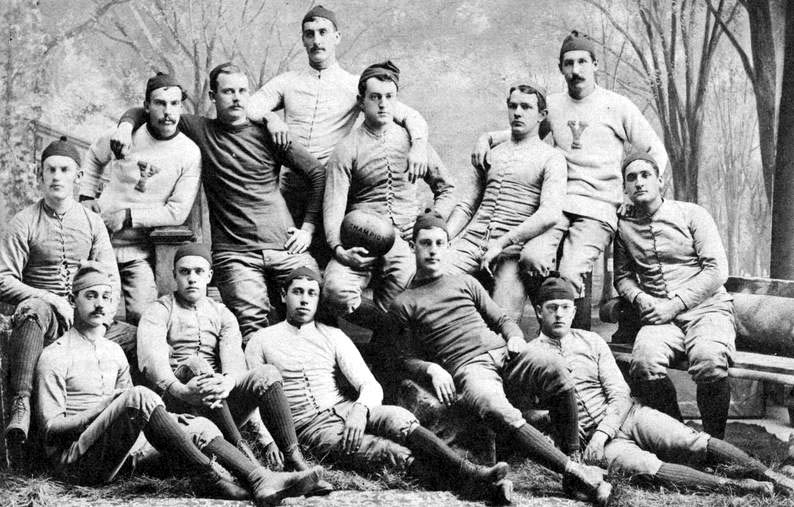
- 1882 Yale Bulldogs
- Total No. of teams: 13
- Regular season: October 7 to December 1
- Champion: Yale

The 1882 college football season had no clear-cut champion, with the Official NCAA Division I Football Records Book listing Yale as having been selected national champions.

== Conference and program changes ==
| Team | Former conference | New conference |
|---|---|---|
| Colorado College Tigers | Program established | Independent |
| Fordham | Program established | Independent |
| Lake Forest | Program established | Independent |
| Minnesota Golden Gophers | Program established | Independent |
| Clifton AC | Program established | Independent |
| Lafayette | Program established | Independent |

== Conference standings ==
1882 college football records
| | Conf. | | | Overall |
| Team | W | L | T | W | | L | | T |
|---|---|---|---|---|---|---|---|---|
| Yale | | – | | 8 | – | 0 | – | 0 |
| Colorado College | | – | | 1 | – | 0 | – | 0 |
| Navy | | – | | 1 | – | 0 | – | 0 |
| Richmond | | – | | 1 | – | 0 | – | 0 |
| Harvard | | – | | 7 | – | 1 | – | 0 |
| Fordham | | – | | 7 | – | 1 | – | 0 |
| Princeton | | – | | 7 | – | 2 | – | 0 |
| Wesleyan | | – | | 3 | – | 1 | – | 0 |
| Rutgers | | – | | 6 | – | 4 | – | 0 |
| Columbian University | | – | | 0 | – | 0 | – | 1 |
| Dartmouth | | – | | 1 | – | 1 | – | 0 |
| Lake Forest | | – | | 1 | – | 1 | – | 0 |
| Minnesota | | – | | 1 | – | 1 | – | 0 |
| Northwestern | | – | | 1 | – | 1 | – | 0 |
| Stevens | | – | | 1 | – | 1 | – | 1 |
| Amherst | | – | | 2 | – | 3 | – | 0 |
| Penn | | – | | 2 | – | 4 | – | 0 |
| CCNY | | – | | 1 | – | 2 | – | 0 |
| MIT | | – | | 1 | – | 4 | – | 0 |
| Randolph–Macon | | – | | 0 | – | 1 | – | 0 |
| Clifton AC | | – | | 0 | – | 1 | – | 0 |
| Lafayette | | – | | 0 | – | 2 | – | 0 |
| McGill | | – | | 0 | – | 2 | – | 0 |
| NYU | | – | | 0 | – | 2 | – | 0 |
| Massachusetts | | – | | 0 | – | 3 | – | 0 |
| Columbia | | – | | 0 | – | 5 | – | 0 |
