= H. R. Hundley =

American educator and football coach (1867–1934)

Biographical details
- Born: August 10, 1867; Louisa County, Virginia, U.S.
- Died: January 24, 1934 (aged 66); Granville, Ohio, U.S.

Playing career
- 1886–1887: Richmond

Coaching career (HC unless noted)
- 1887: Richmond
- 1900: Denison

Head coaching record
- Overall: 3–6–1

Henry Rhodes Hundley (August 10, 1867 – January 24, 1934) was an American educator and college football coach. He was the third head football coach at Richmond College—now known as the University of Richmond—serving for one season, in 1887, and compiling a record of 1–1. Hundley was later a faculty member at Denison University, where was also the head football coach for one year, in 1900, compiling a record of 2–5–1.

Hundley was dean of the Doane Academy from 1900 to 1927.

== Head coaching record ==
Year	Team	Overall	Conference	Standing	Bowl/playoffs
Richmond Colts (Independent) (1887)
1887	Richmond	1–1			
Richmond:		1–1			
Denison Big Red (Independent) (1900)
1900	Denison	2–5–1			
Denison:		2–5–1			
Total:		3–6–1			
