= M. C. Taylor =

American football coach

Coaching career (HC unless noted)
- 1881: Richmond

Head coaching record
- Overall: 2–0

M. C. Taylor was an American college football coach. He was the first head football coach at Richmond College—now known as the University of Richmond—serving for one season, in 1881, and compiling record of 2–0. Taylor was among the first to coach a college football team.

== Head coaching record ==
| Year | Team | Overall | Conference | Standing | Bowl/playoffs |
|---|---|---|---|---|---|
Richmond Colts (Independent) (1881)
| 1881 | Richmond | 2–0 | | | |
| Richmond: | | 2–0 | | | |
| Total: | | 2–0 | | | |
