= Henry Twombly =

American football player and lawyer (1862–1955)

Profile
- Position: Quarterback

Personal information
- Born: November 10, 1862; Albany, New York, U.S.
- Died: February 28, 1955 (aged 92); Summit, New Jersey, U.S.

Career information
- High school: Boston Latin
- College: Yale (1881–1883)

Awards and highlights
- National championship (1882)

Henry Bancroft "Deac" Twombly (November 10, 1862 – February 28, 1955) was an American college football player and lawyer. He is known for inventing quarterback signals. He played quarterback for the Yale Bulldogs football team of Yale University from 1881 to 1883. He helped lead Yale to a 21–0–1 record over three seasons. All three of those Yale teams were later recognized as national champions. Walter Camp played in the same backfield on the 1881 Yale Bulldogs football team.

Twombly graduated from Yale in 1884 and from Harvard Law School in 1886. During this legal career, Twombly was a senior partner of Putney, Twombly, Hall & Skidmore located at the City Investing Building in Manhattan. He participated the incorporation of General Electric and the Otis Elevator Company. Twombly died on February 28, 1955, at his home in Summit, New Jersey. At the time of his death, he was last living man who played football at Yale with Camp.
