= 1889 Navy Midshipmen football team =

American college football season

1889 Navy Midshipmen football
- Conference: Independent
- Record: 4–1–1
- Head coach: None
- Captain: Albertus Catlin

1889 Southern college football independents records
	Conf.			Overall
Team	W	L	T	W		L		T
Trinity (NC)		–		2	–	0	–	0
Georgetown		–		5	–	1	–	0
Navy		–		4	–	1	–	1
Virginia		–		4	–	2	–	0
Wake Forest		–		2	–	2	–	0
North Carolina		–		1	–	1	–	0
Delaware		–		1	–	1	–	1
Johns Hopkins		–		2	–	4	–	1
Richmond		–		1	–	2	–	0
Dover Conference Academy		–		0	–	2	–	1
Furman		–		0	–	2	–	0

The 1889 Navy Midshipmen football team represented the United States Naval Academy during the 1889 college football season. The team compiled a 4–1–1 record and outscored opponents 112 to 42. In the ninth installment of the Johns Hopkins–Navy football rivalry, Navy won by a 36 to 0 score. The team captain was Albertus Catlin.

== Schedule ==
Date	Time	Opponent	Site	Result	Source
October 26		St. John's (MD)	Annapolis, MD	W 20–10	
November 2		Johns Hopkins	Annapolis, MD (rivalry)	W 36–0	
November 9		Dickinson	Annapolis, MD	T 0–0	
November 28	10:45 a.m.	Lehigh	Annapolis, MD	L 6–26	
December 7		Virginia	Annapolis, MD	W 26–6	
December 25		at Washington All-Stars	Washington, DC	W 24–0	
