= Stevens football =

Football team that represented the Stevens Institute of Technology

- First season: 1872; 154 years ago
- Last season: 1924; 102 years ago
- Location: Hoboken, New Jersey
- Conference: Independent
- Colors: Red and Gray

National championships
- Claimed: 0

Conference championships
- 0

Conference division championships
- 0

The Stevens football team represented the Stevens Institute of Technology in college football.

== History ==
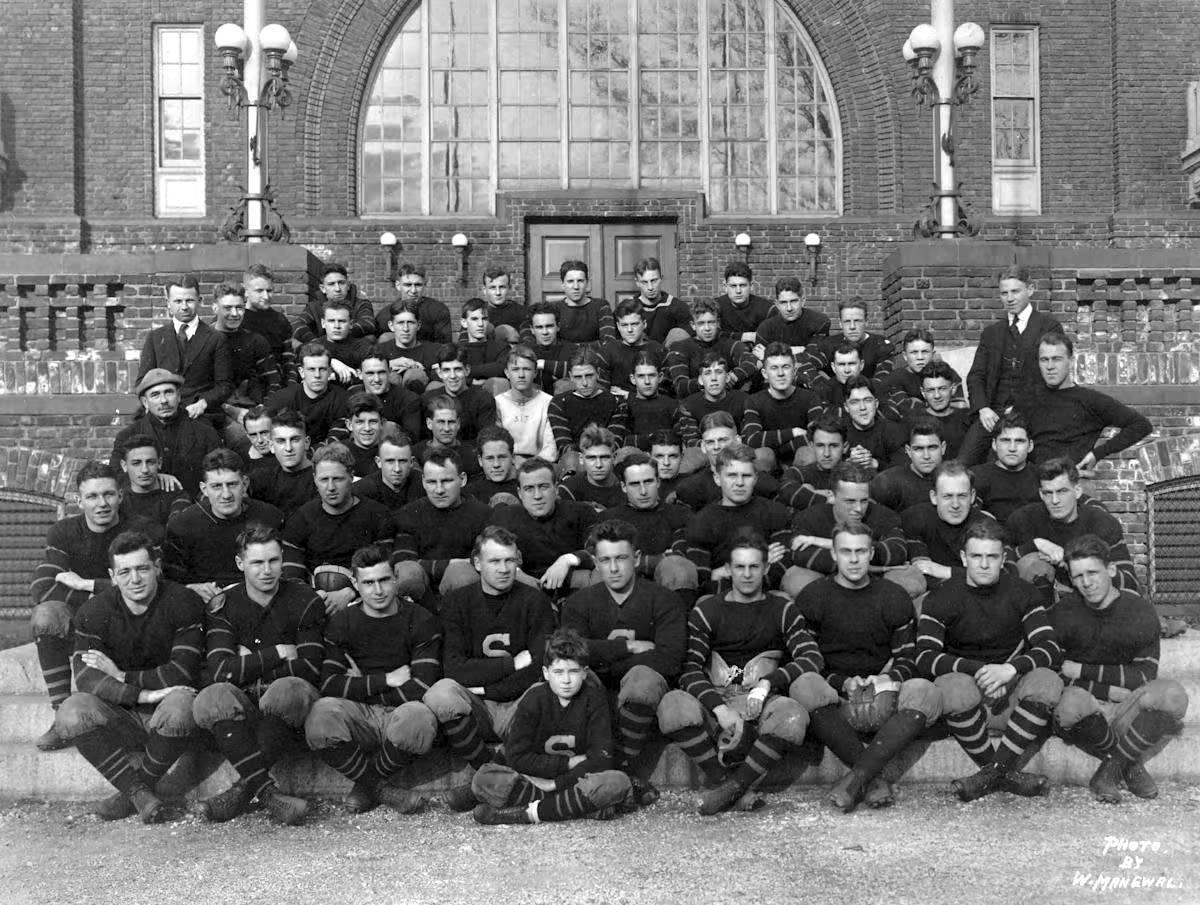
The undefeated Stevens Tech team of 1919

Stevens was one of the first five college football teams.

In 1873, representatives of Princeton, Yale, Columbia, and Rutgers met in New York City to establish the first American intercollegiate rules for football on the model of the London Football Association.

As the game developed in the United States it became progressively more violent and Stevens became disadvantaged. The alumni magazine commented that the style of the game became too difficult and required an enormous amount of time and training which could be afforded by larger colleges, but would add too much work to the already difficult academic coursework at Stevens. President Alexander Crombie Humphreys ended the football program after the 1924 season.
