= 1880 Princeton Tigers football team =

American college football season

1880 Princeton Tigers football
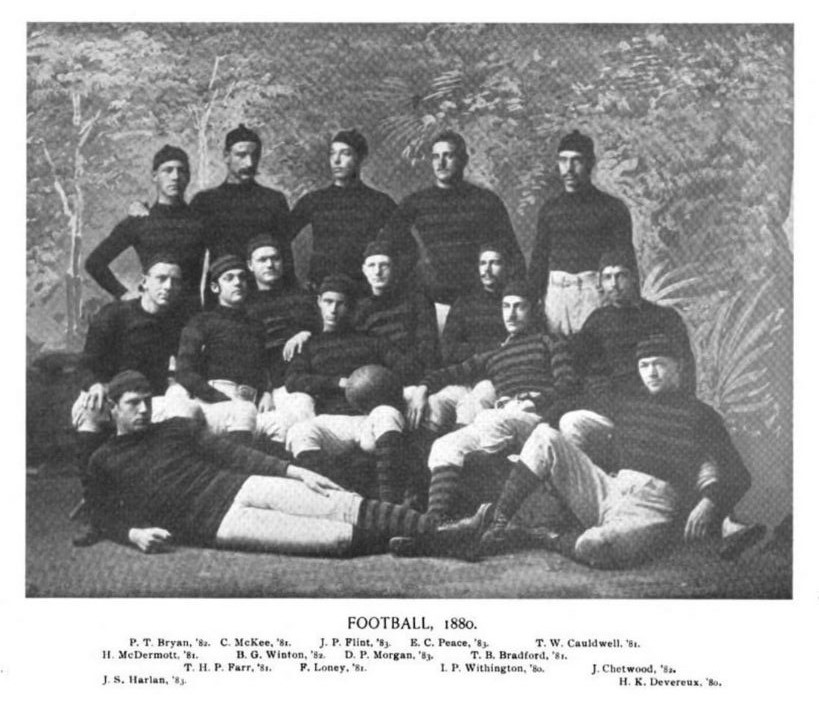

Co-national champion (NCF, Davis)
- Conference: Independent
- Record: 4–0–1
- Head coach: None
- Captain: Francis Loney

1880 college football records
	Conf.			Overall
Team	W	L	T	W		L		T
Princeton		–		4	–	0	–	1
Yale		–		4	–	0	–	1
Kentucky University		–		2	–	0	–	0
Michigan		–		1	–	0	–	0
Harvard		–		2	–	2	–	2
Penn		–		2	–	2	–	0
Rutgers		–		2	–	2	–	0
Columbia		–		1	–	2	–	0
Amherst		–		0	–	1	–	1
Massachusetts		–		0	–	1	–	1
Stevens		–		1	–	4	–	0
Brown		–		0	–	1	–	0
CCNY		–		0	–	1	–	0
Philadelphia Crescent AC		–		0	–	1	–	0
Toronto		–		0	–	1	–	0
Centre		–		0	–	2	–	0

The 1880 Princeton Tigers football team represented the College of New Jersey, then more commonly known as Princeton College, in the 1880 college football season. The team finished with a 4–0–1 record and was retroactively named co-national champion by the National Championship Foundation and Parke H. Davis. This season was Princeton's tenth national championship and one of 11 in a 13-year period between 1869 and 1881. The captain of the team was Francis Loney.

On November 13 at the Polo Grounds in New York City, Princeton defeated Harvard with between 3,000 and 4,000 in attendance. Princeton scored two goals and held Harvard to one goal. Princeton also had five touchdowns for safety to two for Harvard. The Sun of New York reported that the game, played under the new 1880 rules of the Intercollegiate Football Association, was football in name only, but "in reality a series of wrestling encounters for possession of a large leather globe."

Princeton ended the season as it did in 1879, with a 0–0 tie against Yale at a neutral site near New York.

== Schedule ==
Date	Time	Opponent	Site	Result	Attendance	Source
October 23		Stevens	Princeton, NJ	W 6–0		
November 2		Rutgers	Princeton, NJ (rivalry)	W 8–0		
November 6		Penn	Princeton, NJ (rivalry)	W 1–0		
November 13	2:45 p.m.	vs. Harvard	Polo Grounds; New York, NY (rivalry)	W 2–1	1,500–4,000	
November 25	2:30 p.m.	vs. Yale	Polo Grounds; New York, NY (rivalry)	T 0–0	4,000	

== Roster ==
- Thomas Bradford
- Thomas Cauldwell
- H. K. Devereux
- Flint
- James Harlan
- Frank Loney
- H. W. McKee
- P. Morgan
- Edward Peace
- Riggs
- Taylor Ryan
- C. J. Winston
- J. P. Withington
