= 1880 Michigan Wolverines football team =

American college football season

1880 Michigan Wolverines football
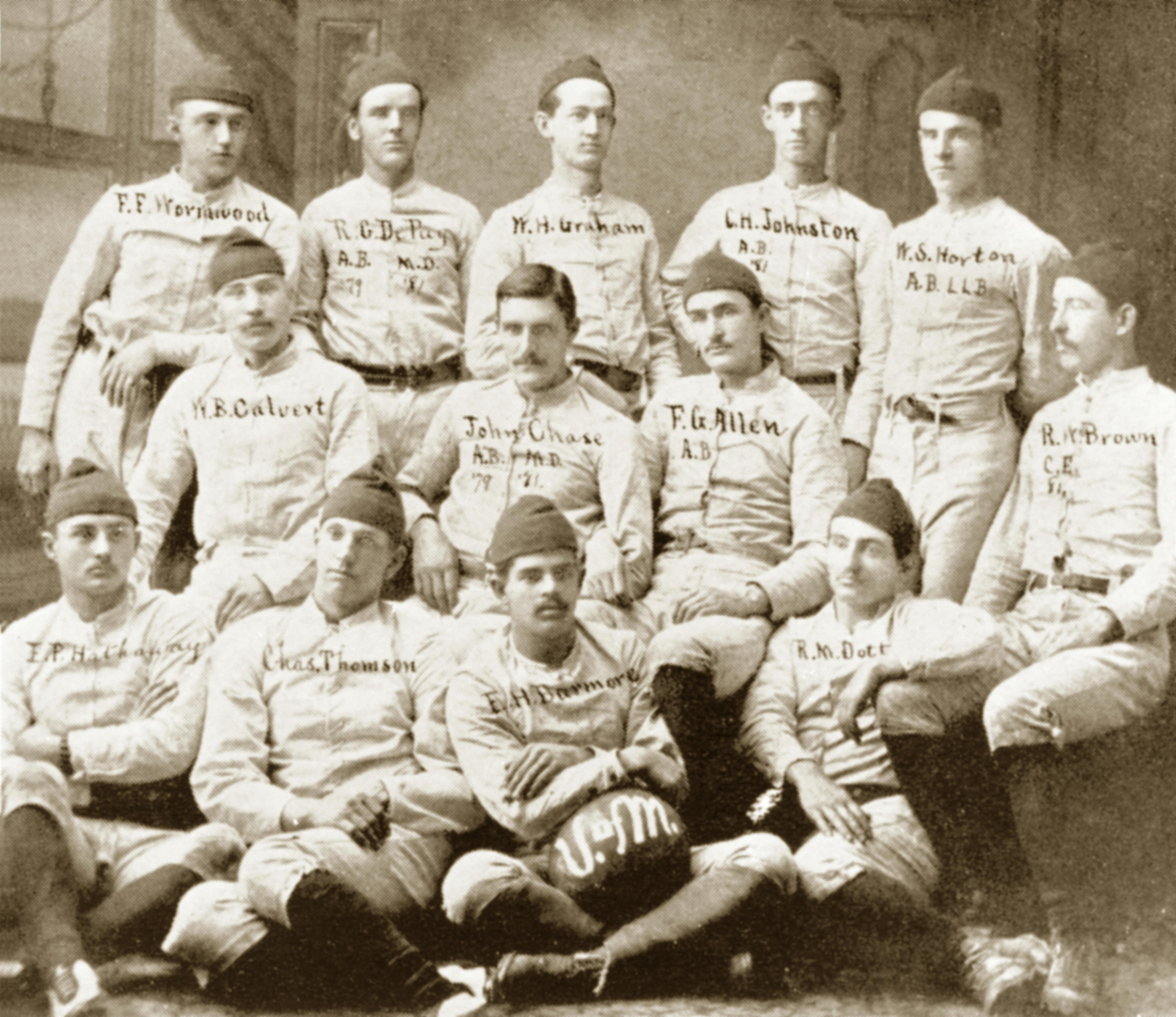
- Conference: Independent
- Record: 1–0
- Head coach: None
- Captain: John Chase
- Home stadium: None

1880 college football records
	Conf.			Overall
Team	W	L	T	W		L		T
Princeton		–		4	–	0	–	1
Yale		–		4	–	0	–	1
Kentucky University		–		2	–	0	–	0
Michigan		–		1	–	0	–	0
Harvard		–		2	–	2	–	2
Penn		–		2	–	2	–	0
Rutgers		–		2	–	2	–	0
Columbia		–		1	–	2	–	0
Amherst		–		0	–	1	–	1
Massachusetts		–		0	–	1	–	1
Stevens		–		1	–	4	–	0
Brown		–		0	–	1	–	0
CCNY		–		0	–	1	–	0
Philadelphia Crescent AC		–		0	–	1	–	0
Toronto		–		0	–	1	–	0
Centre		–		0	–	2	–	0

The 1880 Michigan Wolverines football team represented the University of Michigan in the 1880 college football season. The team was the second intercollegiate football team to represent the University of Michigan. They played one game, defeating the team from the University of Toronto, 13 to 6, at the Toronto Lacrosse Club. Michigan scored two touchdowns and one goal; Toronto scored three safety touchdowns.

The team had no coach, and John Chase was the captain. Chase later became a general and commander of the Colorado National Guard in two of the most significant confrontations between American military forces and organized labor – the Colorado Labor Wars of 1903–1904 and the Ludlow Massacre of April 1914. The team's quarterback, Edmond H. Barmore, went into the business of building steamships from 1881 to 1886 and later operated the Los Angeles Transfer Company for about 40 years.

== Schedule ==
Date	Time	Opponent	Site	Result	Attendance
November 6	2:55 p.m.	at Toronto	Toronto Lacrosse Club; Toronto, ON	W 13–6	300

== Season summary ==
=== Preseason ===
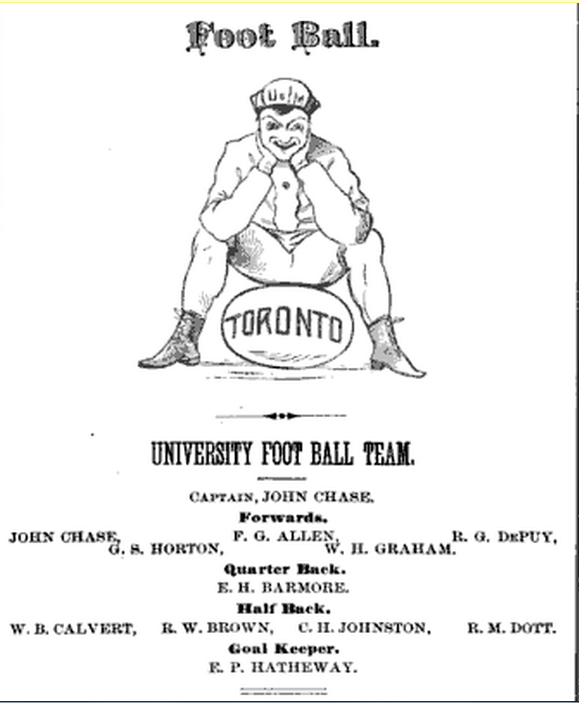
Profile of the 1880 football team from "The Palladium" of 1881

Although the 1880 season featured only one inter-collegiate game, that game was preceded by a series of inter-class football games. The first inter-class game was a game between the freshman and the sophomores that stretched across three Saturdays. The game began on Saturday, September 25, 1880, with John "Tubby" Chase serving as the referee. The game was resumed two weeks later on Saturday, October 9. On the latter date, the game attracted a crowd estimated at 700 spectators: "The players was [sic] greatly impeded by the crowd, which must have numbered 700, and which followed the ball almost as closely as the players." The game was completed on Saturday, October 23. Having won five of the nine "innings" played, the freshman team was declared the winner. The game was played on a field near the hospital, and The Chronicle (a weekly newspaper at the University of Michigan) commented on the violence in one of the "rushes" that occurred near the hospital: "The one which took place on the hospital steps was almost worthy of a grammar school. It would have been more to the point if the fresh. had displayed their muscle in the ring."

On October 16, 1880, The Chronicle urged every student participate in rugby:

"Every student in the University is requested and urged to come out and play Rugby from two to four in the afternoon. A practice game will also be played every Saturday morning in which those more proficient in the game are invited to participate. It is desirable that every player should turn out as the committee have only their observations to guide them in the selection of a team, and in consequence of the number of players we have lost in the class of '80, more than the usual quota of men will have to be chosen this year."

Because there were no other Midwestern colleges playing football in 1880, The Chronicle reported with interest on a nascent effort to develop a football team at Ohio Wesleyan University. The paper reprinted an editorial from the Ohio Wesleyan newspaper declaring, "It seems to us that there ought to be enough life among the students to get up an interest in the game and play rugby, at least, once in a while." The Chronicle also reported that interest in sports was diminishing among the students at Cornell University (which became a football rival for Michigan in the late 1880s and 1890s), and that rugby had not been introduced there.

On October 16, 1880, The Chronicle wrote that the Athletic Association's corresponding secretary was in correspondence with the football association at the University of Toronto concerning a game between the two schools. The Chronicle noted: "As Toronto is to play Harvard this fall, there is a possibility of our being able to arrange a match with the latter, and at last accomplish the long-talked of game with some eastern college."

=== At Toronto ===
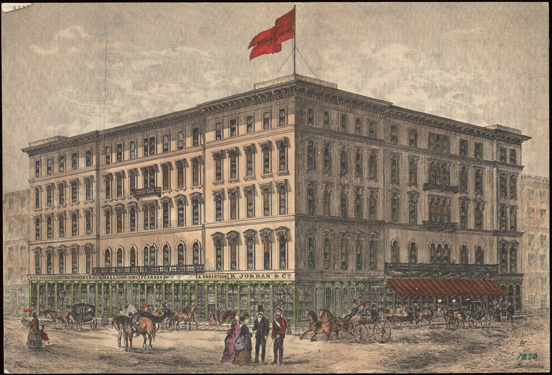
The team stayed at the Rossin House Hotel for their 1880 game in Toronto.

On November 6, 1880, the Michigan football team played its only game of the season against the team from the University of Toronto. The game was the third official game played by the Michigan football team since it began during the 1879 season and the first by Michigan in a foreign country.

The team left Ann Arbor on Friday morning, November 5, on the Michigan Central Railroad. The Chronicle described the traveling group as "a very jolly party" that enlivened the trip with college songs. The team arrived in Toronto on Friday night and stayed at the Rossin House Hotel in the city center. Because of "damp and dismal" weather on Saturday morning, few of the players engaged in sight-seeing and the Toronto team proposed postponing the game until Monday.

The teams opted to proceed with the game as scheduled on Saturday. The game was played at the Toronto Lacrosse Club starting at 2:55 pm and was scheduled for two 45-minute innings. The Chronicle described the playing conditions:

"[T]hroughout the whole of the first inning, the rain was increasing, and, joined with a cold wind from the north, soon drenched and all but froze both players and spectators. The ground was slippery and muddy, the water stood in pools, the ball was soon heavy, and in short circumstances were decidedly against either good playing or enjoyment of it."

The temperature became colder in the later afternoon, and the Toronto team proposed ending the game after the first inning. The teams ultimately agreed to play a shortened second inning of 37 minutes. During the first inning, Michigan was aided by having the wind at its back and running downhill on a slightly sloped field. In the second inning, the teams switched sides. The game ended at 4:27 pm with Michigan ahead 13–6. The scoring for Michigan consisted of "one goal, two touch downs [one by halfback William Calvert], and two tries for goal, against three safety touch downs which Toronto was compelled to make."

Michigan's starting lineup against Toronto was Elnathan P. Hathaway (140 pounds, fullback/goalkeeper), Randolph W. Brown (165 pounds, halfback), Richard Millard Dott (145 pounds, halfback), Edmond H. Barmore (147 pounds, quarterback), John "Tubby" Chase (178 pounds, captain and forward), Richard G. DePuy (150 pounds, forward), Frank Gates Allen (170 pounds, forward), William Graham (150 pounds, forward), Walter S. Horton (155 pounds, forward), William B. Calvert (158 pounds, forward), and Collins H. Johnston (150 pounds, forward). Frank Wormwood began the game as the umpire for Michigan, but he was called into the game to replace DePuy, who was badly injured after being "bunted into the fence by a Toronto man." Charles Thomson took over as the umpire for Michigan.

After the game, the Toronto team hosted the Michigan team at a reception held at the College Residence. The team spent Sunday in Toronto and departed on the 9:50 Great Western train on Monday morning.

== Players ==
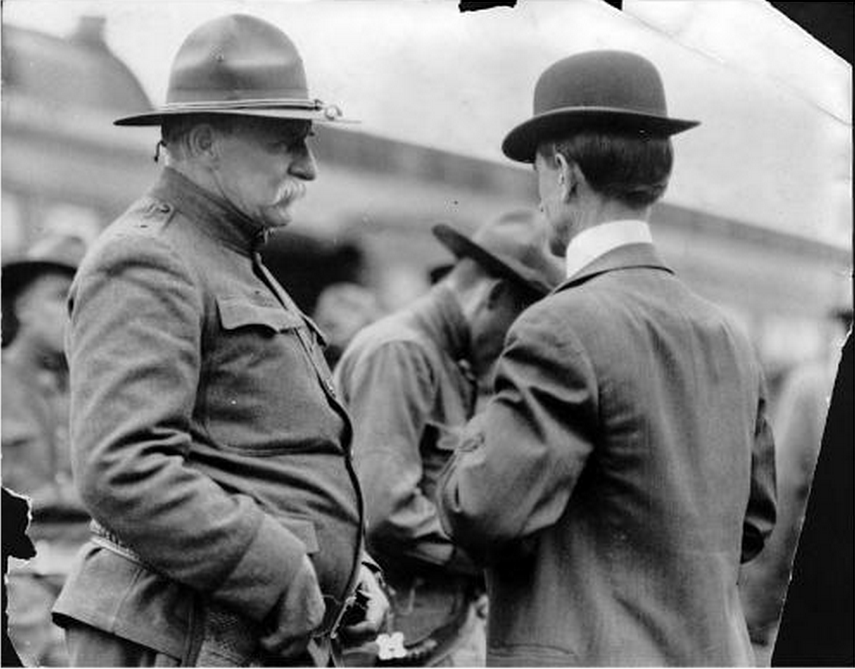
Michigan's 1889 team captain John Chase was the commander of the Colorado National Guard at the Ludlow Massacre in 1914.

Quarterback Edmond H. Barmore became a prominent Los Angeles businessman.

=== Varsity letter winners ===
- Frank Gates Allen, Aurora, Illinois – forward
- Edmond H. Barmore, Jeffersonville, Indiana – quarterback
- Randolph W. Brown, Rochester, Minnesota – halfback
- William B. Calvert, Ann Arbor, Michigan – halfback
- John "Tubby" Chase, Ann Arbor, MI – forward and captain
- Richard G. DePuy, Jamestown, North Dakota – forward
- Richard Millard Dott, Sioux City, Iowa – halfback
- William Graham, Grand Rapids, Michigan – forward
- Elnathan P. Hathaway, Ottawa, Illinois – fullback/goalkeeper
- Walter S. Horton, Peoria, Illinois – forward
- Collins H. Johnston, Grand Rapids, Michigan – halfback

=== Others ===
- Charles Thomson, Hillsdale, Michigan – substitute and umpire
- Frank F. Wormwood, Rockford, Illinois – substitute forward and umpire
