= 1881 Princeton Tigers football team =

American college football season

1881 Princeton Tigers football

National champion (Billingsley) Co-national champion (Parke H. Davis)
- Conference: Independent
- Record: 7–0–2
- Head coach: None
- Captain: P. T. Bryan

1881 college football records
	Conf.			Overall
Team	W	L	T	W		L		T
MIT		–		3	–	0	–	0
Richmond		–		2	–	0	–	0
Georgetown		–		1	–	0	–	0
Yale		–		5	–	0	–	1
Princeton		–		7	–	0	–	2
Penn State		–		1	–	0	–	0
Columbian University		–		1	–	0	–	1
Dartmouth		–		1	–	0	–	1
Harvard		–		6	–	1	–	1
Massachusetts		–		2	–	1	–	1
Kentucky University		–		2	–	1	–	0
Columbia		–		3	–	3	–	1
Rutgers		–		2	–	4	–	1
Stevens		–		1	–	2	–	1
Kentucky State College		–		1	–	2	–	0
CCNY		–		1	–	1	–	1
Amherst		–		0	–	3	–	2
Lewisburg		–		0	–	1	–	0
Wesleyan		–		0	–	1	–	0
Randolph–Macon		–		0	–	2	–	0
Michigan		–		0	–	3	–	0
Penn		–		0	–	5	–	0

The 1881 Princeton Tigers football team represented the College of New Jersey, then more commonly known as Princeton College, in the 1881 college football season. The team finished with a 7–0–2 record and was retroactively named national champion by the Billingsley Report and as co-national champion by Parke H. Davis. This season marked Princeton's 11th national championship in a 13-year period between 1869 and 1881. P. T. Bryan was the captain of the team.

No goals were scored against the Tigers in 1881 and the season ended as it had for the fourth time in five years; a 0–0 tie against Yale in or near New York.

== Schedule ==
Date	Time	Opponent	Site	Result	Attendance	Source
October 15		Rutgers	Princeton, NJ (rivalry)	W 3–0		
October 22		Stevens	Princeton, NJ	W 7–0		
October 29		at Penn	Philadelphia, PA (rivalry)	W 7–0		
November 4		Michigan	Princeton, NJ	W 1–0		
November 5		Penn	Princeton, NJ	W 4–0		
November 10	2:15 p.m.	at Rutgers	New Brunswick, NJ	W 1–0		
November 12	2:38 p.m.	Columbia	Polo Grounds; New York, NY	W 1–0		
November 19	2:30 p.m.	vs. Harvard	Polo Grounds; New York, NY (rivalry)	T 0–0	2,500	
November 24		vs. Yale	Polo Grounds; New York, NY (rivalry)	T 0–0	10,000	

== Game summaries ==
=== November 4: Princeton 1, Michigan 0 ===
The Michigan Wolverines toured the east in 1881, playing the first games between western and eastern teams. Michigan played at Harvard on October 31 and at Yale on November 2, 1881, losing both games. The trip was planned to end after the Yale game, however a Princeton representative attended the game in New Haven and challenged Michigan to a game in two days. Michigan's captain and quarterback Walter S. Horton did not want to accept, but the team over-ruled him. Horton then refused to play, and substitute Henry S. Mahon had to fill in for him.

Michigan forward Fred Townsend wrote about the game in 1901, reporting that Princeton scored a goal in the first half on a long kick aided by the wind. Michigan could not score any goals or touchdowns throughout the contest, while late in the second half Princeton scored two touchdowns. A New Jersey newspaper reported: "The Princeton College team were victorious Thursday [sic] in a football match with the team of the University of Michigan after an exciting struggle." The Daily State Gazette wrote: "A finely contested game of football at the University grounds Friday, between Princeton and University of Michigan resulted in a victory for the home team, Princeton 1 goal, 2 touchdowns; University of Michigan 0."
