= 1881 Harvard Crimson football team =

American college football season

1881 Harvard Crimson football
- Conference: Independent
- Record: 6–1–1
- Head coach: Lucius Littauer (1st season)
- Captain: William H. Manning
- Home stadium: Boston Baseball Grounds, Holmes Field

1881 college football records
	Conf.			Overall
Team	W	L	T	W		L		T
MIT		–		3	–	0	–	0
Richmond		–		2	–	0	–	0
Georgetown		–		1	–	0	–	0
Yale		–		5	–	0	–	1
Princeton		–		7	–	0	–	2
Penn State		–		1	–	0	–	0
Columbian University		–		1	–	0	–	1
Dartmouth		–		1	–	0	–	1
Harvard		–		6	–	1	–	1
Massachusetts		–		2	–	1	–	1
Kentucky University		–		2	–	1	–	0
Columbia		–		3	–	3	–	1
Rutgers		–		2	–	4	–	1
Stevens		–		1	–	2	–	1
Kentucky State College		–		1	–	2	–	0
CCNY		–		1	–	1	–	1
Amherst		–		0	–	3	–	2
Lewisburg		–		0	–	1	–	0
Wesleyan		–		0	–	1	–	0
Randolph–Macon		–		0	–	2	–	0
Michigan		–		0	–	3	–	0
Penn		–		0	–	5	–	0

The 1881 Harvard Crimson football team represented Harvard University in the 1881 college football season. They Crimson compiled a record of 6–1–1. The team was managed by first-year head coach, Lucius Littauer, and captained for the second year by William H. Manning.

== Schedule ==
Date	Time	Opponent	Site	Result	Attendance	Source
October 20	3:00 p.m.	Montreal Football Club	Boston Baseball Grounds; Boston, MA	W 2–0	400–600	
October 22	3:20 p.m.	Ottawa Football Club	Holmes Field; Cambridge, MA	W 9–1	1,000	
October 29		at Brittania Football Club	Montreal, QC	W 2–0		
October 31	3:15 p.m.	Michigan	Boston Baseball Grounds; Boston, MA	W 4–0	100	
November 2	3:36 p.m.	vs. Penn	Polo Grounds; New York, NY (rivalry)	W 2–0	200	
November 5	2:30 p.m.	Columbia	Holmes Field; Cambridge, MA	W 1–0	2,000	
November 12	2:40 p.m.	at Yale	New Haven, CT (rivalry)	L 0–1	1,500	
November 19	2:30 p.m.	vs. Princeton	Polo Grounds; New York, NY (rivalry)	T 0–0	2,500	

== Game summaries ==
=== October 31: Harvard 4, Michigan 0 ===
Harvard played Michigan on October 31 in the first matchup of teams from the west and east. The Boston Journal carried a lengthy article about the game, saying that Harvard scored one touchdown and Michigan none.

"Yesterday afternoon, in a drenching rain, for the first time an Eastern foot-ball eleven played with a Western eleven. The Western college boys have long wished a chance to try their powers with Eastern opponents, and, to effect this, the University of Michigan this fall have sent on a representative eleven to play the largest of the Eastern colleges. Their first opponent were the Harvard team. They were beaten but with fair weather the result would have been very uncertain. As it was, Harvard won more by luck than by superiority in strength or skill, for with the exception of the first ten minutes they were forced to play a defensive game. ... During the second half hour the ball was near the Harvard line constantly. Once it came within three feet of the chalk, but the most desperate fighting on the Harvard forced it back foot by foot until the immediate danger was over. ... The Michigan team excelled in running, and their tackling was very fair. As to passing, they did very little. It was by all odds the best game seen in Boston this fall."

In 1901, one of the Michigan players, Fred Townsend, wrote an account of the 1881 trip. He said Harvard scored a touchdown at the very beginning of the game, but missed the try for goal. Michigan recovered and came within three yards of scoring a touchdown in the second half, but they were held for downs by the bigger Harvard players.
