= 1880 Yale Bulldogs football team =

American college football season

1880 Yale Bulldogs football

National champion (Billingsley) Co-national champion (NCF, Davis)
- Conference: Independent
- Record: 4–0–1
- Head coach: None
- Captain: Robert W. Watson
- Home stadium: Hamilton Park

1880 college football records
	Conf.			Overall
Team	W	L	T	W		L		T
Princeton		–		4	–	0	–	1
Yale		–		4	–	0	–	1
Kentucky University		–		2	–	0	–	0
Michigan		–		1	–	0	–	0
Harvard		–		2	–	2	–	2
Penn		–		2	–	2	–	0
Rutgers		–		2	–	2	–	0
Columbia		–		1	–	2	–	0
Amherst		–		0	–	1	–	1
Massachusetts		–		0	–	1	–	1
Stevens		–		1	–	4	–	0
Brown		–		0	–	1	–	0
CCNY		–		0	–	1	–	0
Philadelphia Crescent AC		–		0	–	1	–	0
Toronto		–		0	–	1	–	0
Centre		–		0	–	2	–	0

The 1880 Yale Bulldogs football team represented Yale University in the 1880 college football season. The team finished with a 4–0–1 record, did not allow opposing teams to score a single point, outscored all opponents, 30–0, and was retroactively named national champion by the Billingsley Report and as co-national champion with Princeton by the National Championship Foundation and Parke H. Davis.

== Schedule ==
Date	Time	Opponent	Site	Result	Attendance	Source
November 10	3:00 p.m.	Columbia	Hamilton Park; New Haven, CT	W 13–0	600	
November 13		Brown	Hamilton Park; New Haven, CT	W 8–0	250	
November 17		vs. Penn	Polo Grounds; New York, NY	W 8–0	500	
November 20	2:45 p.m.	at Harvard	Boston Baseball Grounds; Boston, MA (rivalry)	W 1–0	700	
November 25	2:30 p.m.	vs. Princeton	Polo Grounds; New York, NY (rivalry)	T 0–0	4,000	

== Roster ==
- Rushers: Philo Carroll Fuller, Charles S. Beck, Louis K. Hull, John S. Harding, Benjamin B. Lamb, Charles Bigelow Storrs, Franklin M. Eaton
- Quarterback: Walter Irving Badger
- Halfbacks: Robert W. Watson, Walter Camp
- Back: Benjamin Wisner Bacon
- Others: John L. Adams, George H. Clark, John S. Durand, Howard H. Knapp, Chester W. Lyman, John F. Merrill, John Moorhead Jr., William Nixon, William A. Peters, Frederic Remington, Adrian S. Van de Graaff, Frederick R. Vernon
- Manager: William B. Hill
