= 1881 MIT Techmen football team =

American college football season

1881 MIT Techmen football
- Conference: Independent
- Record: 3–0
- Head coach: None

1881 college football records
	Conf.			Overall
Team	W	L	T	W		L		T
MIT		–		3	–	0	–	0
Richmond		–		2	–	0	–	0
Georgetown		–		1	–	0	–	0
Yale		–		5	–	0	–	1
Princeton		–		7	–	0	–	2
Penn State		–		1	–	0	–	0
Columbian University		–		1	–	0	–	1
Dartmouth		–		1	–	0	–	1
Harvard		–		6	–	1	–	1
Massachusetts		–		2	–	1	–	1
Kentucky University		–		2	–	1	–	0
Columbia		–		3	–	3	–	1
Rutgers		–		2	–	4	–	1
Stevens		–		1	–	2	–	1
Kentucky State College		–		1	–	2	–	0
CCNY		–		1	–	1	–	1
Amherst		–		0	–	3	–	2
Lewisburg		–		0	–	1	–	0
Wesleyan		–		0	–	1	–	0
Randolph–Macon		–		0	–	2	–	0
Michigan		–		0	–	3	–	0
Penn		–		0	–	5	–	0

The 1881 MIT Techmen football team represented the Massachusetts Institute of Technology (MIT) during the 1881 college football season. The team compiled a record of 3–0.

== Schedule ==
Date	Opponent	Site	Result	Source
	Exeter College		W 2–0	
	Adams Academy (MA)		W 0–0	
November 12	at Massachusetts	Alumni Field; Amherst, MA	W 8–0	
