= 1880 college football season =

American college football season

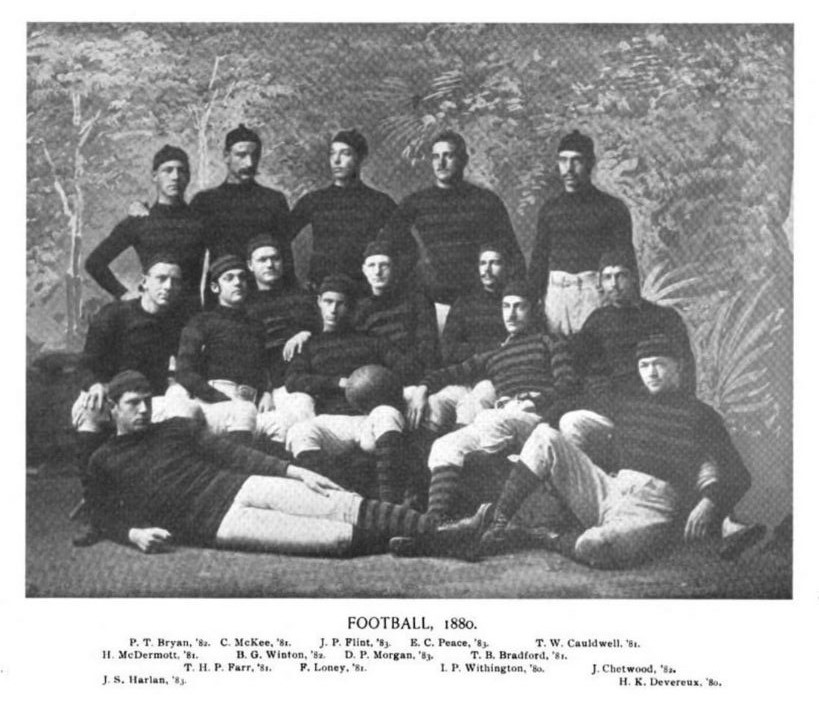
- 1880 Princeton Tigers
- Total No. of teams: 16
- Regular season: October 9 to November 25
- Champion(s): Princeton; Yale

The 1880 college football season had no clear-cut champion, with the Official NCAA Division I Football Records Book listing Princeton and Yale as having been selected national champions. On April 9, college football was first played in the state of Kentucky when Kentucky University defeated Centre 13 3/4–0 at Stoll Field. It was one of the first in the South.

== Conference and program changes ==
Team	Former conference	New conference
Kentucky University	Program established	Independent
Centre	Program established	Independent
Philadelphia Crescent AC	Program established	Independent

== Conference standings ==
1880 college football records
	Conf.			Overall
Team	W	L	T	W		L		T
Princeton		–		4	–	0	–	1
Yale		–		4	–	0	–	1
Kentucky University		–		2	–	0	–	0
Michigan		–		1	–	0	–	0
Harvard		–		2	–	2	–	2
Penn		–		2	–	2	–	0
Rutgers		–		2	–	2	–	0
Columbia		–		1	–	2	–	0
Amherst		–		0	–	1	–	1
Massachusetts		–		0	–	1	–	1
Stevens		–		1	–	4	–	0
Brown		–		0	–	1	–	0
CCNY		–		0	–	1	–	0
Philadelphia Crescent AC		–		0	–	1	–	0
Toronto		–		0	–	1	–	0
Centre		–		0	–	2	–	0
