= 1880 Rutgers Queensmen football team =

American college football season

1880 Rutgers Queensmen football
- Conference: Independent
- Record: 2–2
- Head coach: None
- Captain: John Morrison
- Home stadium: College Field

1880 college football records
	Conf.			Overall
Team	W	L	T	W		L		T
Princeton		–		4	–	0	–	1
Yale		–		4	–	0	–	1
Kentucky University		–		2	–	0	–	0
Michigan		–		1	–	0	–	0
Harvard		–		2	–	2	–	2
Penn		–		2	–	2	–	0
Rutgers		–		2	–	2	–	0
Columbia		–		1	–	2	–	0
Amherst		–		0	–	1	–	1
Massachusetts		–		0	–	1	–	1
Stevens		–		1	–	4	–	0
Brown		–		0	–	1	–	0
CCNY		–		0	–	1	–	0
Philadelphia Crescent AC		–		0	–	1	–	0
Toronto		–		0	–	1	–	0
Centre		–		0	–	2	–	0

The 1880 Rutgers Queensmen football team represented Rutgers University as an independent during the 1880 college football season. The team compiled a 2–2 record and was outscored by opponents 12 to 6 The team had no coach, and its captain was John Morrison.

== Schedule ==
Date	Opponent	Site	Result	Attendance	Source
October 9	Stevens	New Brunswick, NJ	W 5–1		
October 16	at Stevens	St. George's Cricket Club grounds; Hoboken, NJ	W 1–0	200	
November 2	at Princeton	Princeton, NJ (rivalry)	L 0–8		
November 13	at Columbia	Polo Grounds; New York, NY	L 0–3		

.
