= 1880 Kentucky University football team =

American college football season

1880 Kentucky University football
- Conference: Independent
- Record: 2–0
- Head coach: None

1880 college football records
	Conf.			Overall
Team	W	L	T	W		L		T
Princeton		–		4	–	0	–	1
Yale		–		4	–	0	–	1
Kentucky University		–		2	–	0	–	0
Michigan		–		1	–	0	–	0
Harvard		–		2	–	2	–	2
Penn		–		2	–	2	–	0
Rutgers		–		2	–	2	–	0
Columbia		–		1	–	2	–	0
Amherst		–		0	–	1	–	1
Massachusetts		–		0	–	1	–	1
Stevens		–		1	–	4	–	0
Brown		–		0	–	1	–	0
CCNY		–		0	–	1	–	0
Philadelphia Crescent AC		–		0	–	1	–	0
Toronto		–		0	–	1	–	0
Centre		–		0	–	2	–	0

The 1880 Kentucky University football team represented Kentucky University—now known as Transylvania University—in the 1880 college football season. This was Kentucky U's first ever season. The first game is claimed as the first game ever played in the south at Stoll Field, though Washington & Lee and VMI played earlier games; it's the first game in the state of Kentucky. The game was said to have resembled a combination of soccer and rugby. Kentucky U won both its games over Centre College.

== Schedule ==
Date	Opponent	Site	Result
April 9	Centre	cow pasture; Lexington, KY	W 13¾–0
April 16	at Centre	cow pasture; Danville, KY	W 5½–0

== See also ==
- List of the first college football game in each US state
