= 1880 Columbia football team =

American college football season

1880 Columbia football
- Conference: Independent
- Record: 1–2
- Head coach: None
- Captain: Frederick A. Potts
- Home stadium: Polo Grounds

1880 college football records
	Conf.			Overall
Team	W	L	T	W		L		T
Princeton		–		4	–	0	–	1
Yale		–		4	–	0	–	1
Kentucky University		–		2	–	0	–	0
Michigan		–		1	–	0	–	0
Harvard		–		2	–	2	–	2
Penn		–		2	–	2	–	0
Rutgers		–		2	–	2	–	0
Columbia		–		1	–	2	–	0
Amherst		–		0	–	1	–	1
Massachusetts		–		0	–	1	–	1
Stevens		–		1	–	4	–	0
Brown		–		0	–	1	–	0
CCNY		–		0	–	1	–	0
Philadelphia Crescent AC		–		0	–	1	–	0
Toronto		–		0	–	1	–	0
Centre		–		0	–	2	–	0

The 1880 Columbia football team represented Columbia University in the 1880 college football season. The team had no head coach, and compiled a record of 1–2. Frederick A. Potts served as team captain.

== Schedule ==
Date	Time	Opponent	Site	Result	Attendance	Source
November 6	3:15 p.m.	Harvard	Polo Grounds; New York, NY	L 0–3	300	
November 10	3:00 p.m.	at Yale	Hamilton Park; New Haven, CT	L 0–13	600	
November 13		Rutgers	Polo Grounds; New York, NY	W 3–0		
