= P. T. Bryan =

American football player (1862–1932)

Personal information
- Born: October 30, 1861; St. Louis, Missouri, U.S.
- Died: June 24, 1932 (aged 70); Princeton, New Jersey, U.S.

Career information
- College: Princeton (1880–1881)

Awards and highlights
- National championship (1880, 1881)

Pendleton Taylor Bryan (October 30, 1861 – June 23, 1932) was an American college football player and former president of the St Louis Bar Association. He played for the Princeton Tigers, captain of the 1881 team.

Bryan died of streptococcal pharyngitis, on June 23, 1932, at Princeton Hospital in Princeton, New Jersey. He had returned to Princeton to celebrate the 50th anniversary of his graduation.
