= 1881 Columbian University football team =

American college football season

1881 Columbian University football
- Conference: Independent
- Record: 1–0–1
- Head coach: None

1881 college football records
	Conf.			Overall
Team	W	L	T	W		L		T
MIT		–		3	–	0	–	0
Richmond		–		2	–	0	–	0
Georgetown		–		1	–	0	–	0
Yale		–		5	–	0	–	1
Princeton		–		7	–	0	–	2
Penn State		–		1	–	0	–	0
Columbian University		–		1	–	0	–	1
Dartmouth		–		1	–	0	–	1
Harvard		–		6	–	1	–	1
Massachusetts		–		2	–	1	–	1
Kentucky University		–		2	–	1	–	0
Columbia		–		3	–	3	–	1
Rutgers		–		2	–	4	–	1
Stevens		–		1	–	2	–	1
Kentucky State College		–		1	–	2	–	0
CCNY		–		1	–	1	–	1
Amherst		–		0	–	3	–	2
Lewisburg		–		0	–	1	–	0
Wesleyan		–		0	–	1	–	0
Randolph–Macon		–		0	–	2	–	0
Michigan		–		0	–	3	–	0
Penn		–		0	–	5	–	0

The 1881 Columbian University football team was an American football team that represented Columbian University (now known as George Washington University) as an independent during the 1881 college football season. It was the first season in school history.

== Schedule ==
Date	Opponent	Site	Result
	Gallaudet		T ?
December 18	Alexandria Episcopal High School		W 1–0
