= 1880 CCNY Lavender football team =

American college football season

1880 CCNY Lavender football
- Conference: Independent
- Record: 0–1
- Head coach: None

1880 college football records
	Conf.			Overall
Team	W	L	T	W		L		T
Princeton		–		4	–	0	–	1
Yale		–		4	–	0	–	1
Kentucky University		–		2	–	0	–	0
Michigan		–		1	–	0	–	0
Harvard		–		2	–	2	–	2
Penn		–		2	–	2	–	0
Rutgers		–		2	–	2	–	0
Columbia		–		1	–	2	–	0
Amherst		–		0	–	1	–	1
Massachusetts		–		0	–	1	–	1
Stevens		–		1	–	4	–	0
Brown		–		0	–	1	–	0
CCNY		–		0	–	1	–	0
Philadelphia Crescent AC		–		0	–	1	–	0
Toronto		–		0	–	1	–	0
Centre		–		0	–	2	–	0

The 1880 CCNY Lavender football team represented the City College of New York during the 1880 college football season.

== Schedule ==
Date	Opponent	Site	Result
November 2	at Stevens	Hoboken, NJ	L 0–2
