= 1880 Stevens football team =

American college football season

1880 Stevens football
- Conference: Independent
- Record: 1–4
- Head coach: None
- Home stadium: St. George's Cricket Club grounds

1880 college football records
	Conf.			Overall
Team	W	L	T	W		L		T
Princeton		–		4	–	0	–	1
Yale		–		4	–	0	–	1
Kentucky University		–		2	–	0	–	0
Michigan		–		1	–	0	–	0
Harvard		–		2	–	2	–	2
Penn		–		2	–	2	–	0
Rutgers		–		2	–	2	–	0
Columbia		–		1	–	2	–	0
Amherst		–		0	–	1	–	1
Massachusetts		–		0	–	1	–	1
Stevens		–		1	–	4	–	0
Brown		–		0	–	1	–	0
CCNY		–		0	–	1	–	0
Philadelphia Crescent AC		–		0	–	1	–	0
Toronto		–		0	–	1	–	0
Centre		–		0	–	2	–	0

The 1880 Stevens football team represented Stevens Institute of Technology as an independent during the 1880 college football season. The team compiled a 1–4 record and was outscored by its opponents, 20 to 3.

== Schedule ==
Date	Time	Opponent	Site	Result	Attendance	Source
October 9		at Rutgers	New Brunswick, NJ	L 1–5		
October 16		Rutgers	St. George's Cricket Club grounds; Hoboken, NJ	L 0–1	200	
October 23		at Princeton	Princeton, NJ	L 0–6		
November 2		CCNY	Hoboken, NJ	W 6–0		
November 13	11:10 a.m.	Penn	St. George's Cricket Club grounds; Hoboken, NJ	L 0–5		
