= 1881 Rutgers Queensmen football team =

American college football season

1881 Rutgers Queensmen football
- Conference: Independent
- Record: 2–4–1
- Head coach: None
- Captain: John Morrison
- Home stadium: College Field

1881 college football records
	Conf.			Overall
Team	W	L	T	W		L		T
MIT		–		3	–	0	–	0
Richmond		–		2	–	0	–	0
Georgetown		–		1	–	0	–	0
Yale		–		5	–	0	–	1
Princeton		–		7	–	0	–	2
Penn State		–		1	–	0	–	0
Columbian University		–		1	–	0	–	1
Dartmouth		–		1	–	0	–	1
Harvard		–		6	–	1	–	1
Massachusetts		–		2	–	1	–	1
Kentucky University		–		2	–	1	–	0
Columbia		–		3	–	3	–	1
Rutgers		–		2	–	4	–	1
Stevens		–		1	–	2	–	1
Kentucky State College		–		1	–	2	–	0
CCNY		–		1	–	1	–	1
Amherst		–		0	–	3	–	2
Lewisburg		–		0	–	1	–	0
Wesleyan		–		0	–	1	–	0
Randolph–Macon		–		0	–	2	–	0
Michigan		–		0	–	3	–	0
Penn		–		0	–	5	–	0

The 1881 Rutgers Queensmen football team represented Rutgers University as an independent during the 1881 college football season. The team compiled a 2–4–1 record and outscored its opponents, 11 to 8. The team had no coach, and its captain for the second consecutive year was John Morrison.

== Schedule ==
Date	Time	Opponent	Site	Result	Source
October 15		at Princeton	Princeton, NJ (rivalry)	L 0–3	
November 3		at Stevens	Hoboken, NJ	L 0–1	
November 8		Columbia	New Brunswick, NJ	T 0–0	
November 10	2:15 p.m.	Princeton	New Brunswick, NJ	L 0–1	
November 17		CCNY	New Brunswick, NJ	W 10–0	
November 19		at Penn	Young America Cricket grounds; Philadelphia, PA	W 2–1	
November 26	2:40 p.m.	at Columbia	Polo Grounds; New York, NY	L 0–2	
