= 1880 Brown Bears football team =

American college football season

1880 Brown Bears football
- Conference: Independent
- Record: 0–1
- Head coach: None

1880 college football records
	Conf.			Overall
Team	W	L	T	W		L		T
Princeton		–		4	–	0	–	1
Yale		–		4	–	0	–	1
Kentucky University		–		2	–	0	–	0
Michigan		–		1	–	0	–	0
Harvard		–		2	–	2	–	2
Penn		–		2	–	2	–	0
Rutgers		–		2	–	2	–	0
Columbia		–		1	–	2	–	0
Amherst		–		0	–	1	–	1
Massachusetts		–		0	–	1	–	1
Stevens		–		1	–	4	–	0
Brown		–		0	–	1	–	0
CCNY		–		0	–	1	–	0
Philadelphia Crescent AC		–		0	–	1	–	0
Toronto		–		0	–	1	–	0
Centre		–		0	–	2	–	0

The 1880 Brown Bears football team represented Brown University in the 1880 college football season. The team lost its first game with Yale, the only match of the season.

== Schedule ==
Date	Opponent	Site	Result	Attendance	Source
November 13	at Yale	Hamilton Park; New Haven, CT	L 0–8	250	
