= 1881 Amherst football team =

American college football season

1881 Amherst football
- Conference: Independent
- Record: 0–3–2
- Head coach: None

1881 college football records
	Conf.			Overall
Team	W	L	T	W		L		T
MIT		–		3	–	0	–	0
Richmond		–		2	–	0	–	0
Georgetown		–		1	–	0	–	0
Yale		–		5	–	0	–	1
Princeton		–		7	–	0	–	2
Penn State		–		1	–	0	–	0
Columbian University		–		1	–	0	–	1
Dartmouth		–		1	–	0	–	1
Harvard		–		6	–	1	–	1
Massachusetts		–		2	–	1	–	1
Kentucky University		–		2	–	1	–	0
Columbia		–		3	–	3	–	1
Rutgers		–		2	–	4	–	1
Stevens		–		1	–	2	–	1
Kentucky State College		–		1	–	2	–	0
CCNY		–		1	–	1	–	1
Amherst		–		0	–	3	–	2
Lewisburg		–		0	–	1	–	0
Wesleyan		–		0	–	1	–	0
Randolph–Macon		–		0	–	2	–	0
Michigan		–		0	–	3	–	0
Penn		–		0	–	5	–	0

The 1881 Amherst football team represented the Amherst College during the 1881 college football season. Amherst compiled a record of 0–3–2.

== Schedule ==
Date	Time	Opponent	Site	Result	Source
October 22		Massachusetts	Amherst, MA	T 0–0	
October 29	2:30 p.m.	Yale	Amherst, MA	L 0–2	
November 5		at Yale	Hamilton Park; New Haven, CT	L 0–4	
November 16		at Dartmouth	Hanover, NH	L 0–1	
November 24		vs. Dartmouth	Hampden Park; Springfield, MA	T 0–0	
