= John Chase (general) =

American soldier and doctor (1856–1918)

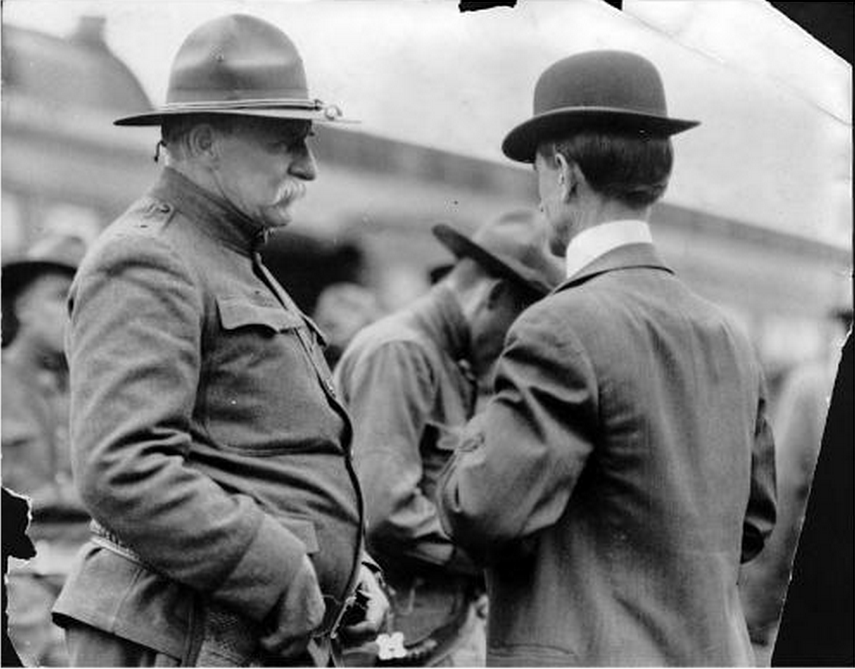
- Gen. John Chase in 1914
- Born: December 10, 1856; Ann Arbor, Michigan
- Died: May 3, 1918 (aged 61); Denver, Colorado
- Education: University of Michigan
- Known for: Medical doctor and National Guard officer

John Chase (December 10, 1856 – May 3, 1918) was an American medical doctor and commander of the Colorado National Guard. He was the commander of the Colorado National Guard in several of the most significant confrontations between American military forces and organized labor — the Colorado Labor Wars of 1903–1904, Colorado Coalfield War, and the Ludlow Massacre of April 1914. He was a graduate of the University of Michigan where he played college football for the 1879 Michigan Wolverines football team, the first football team to represent the University of Michigan, and was captain of the 1880 team.

== Early years ==
Chase was born in Ann Arbor, Michigan, in 1856. His father, John Manley Chase, was a New York native and a civil engineer who surveyed the site of Lansing, Michigan, and served as one of the first treasurers of the University of Michigan. His mother was Elvira L (Ludden) Chase. At the time of the 1860 United States census, Chase lived with his parents and two older siblings in Ann Arbor. His father's occupation was listed at the time as a farmer, and the value of his real estate was listed as $5,000. Chase was educated in the Ann Arbor public schools and graduated from Ann Arbor High School in 1875.

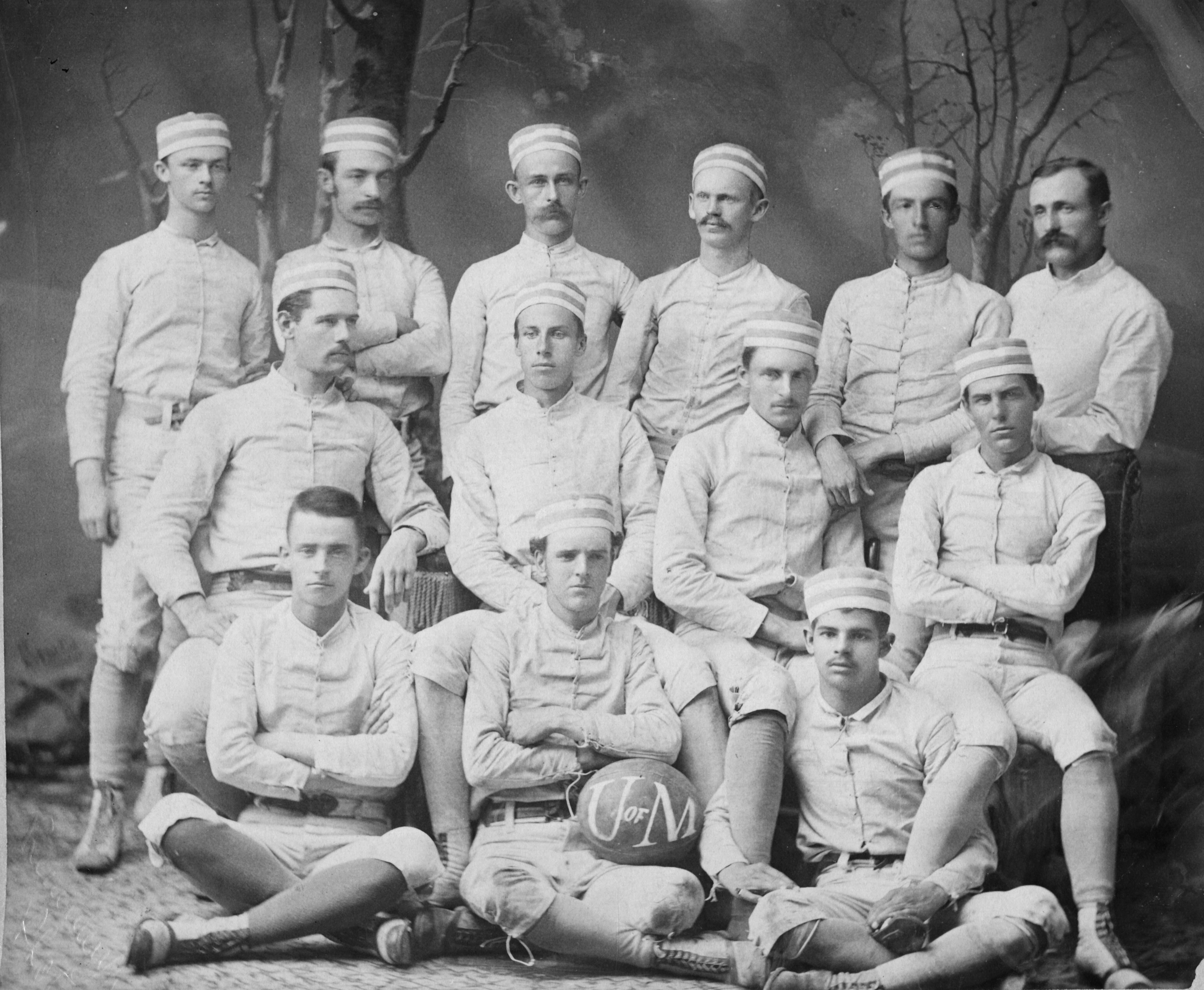
1879 Michigan football team. Chase is seated in the middle row, second from the right.

Chase enrolled at the University of Michigan in the fall of 1875. He played college football for the 1879 Michigan Wolverines football team, the first football team to represent the University of Michigan, and was captain of the 1880 team. He received a Bachelor of Arts degree in 1879 and a Doctor of Medicine degree in 1881.

== Medical practice ==
Chase practiced medicine in Detroit, Michigan, from 1881 to 1884. From 1884 to 1885, Chase traveled in Europe where he continued his studies in diseases of the eye and ear. After contracting typhoid fever, he returned to the United States. Chase moved to Colorado in 1885 and established a medical practice specializing in diseases of the eye. In 1887, Chase was one of the organizers of Gross Medical College, which was later consolidated with Denver Medical College. He was subsequently affiliated with the University of Denver and the University of Colorado School of Medicine, where he served as a professor of ophthalmology and otology. Chase also had investments in the mining industry in Gunnison, Boulder and Chaffee Counties, and ranching operations in Douglas County.

== Military career ==
Photograph of Chase. The caption reads: ADJUTANT-GENERAL JOHN CHASE The Denver oculist in command of the National Guard. General Chase was a brigadier-general in the Cripple Creek strike, and no love is lost between him and the labor men.

=== Early service ===
Chase is most remembered for his military service. His first military service was with the Michigan National Guard from 1878 to 1882, reaching the rank of captain. After moving to Colorado, Chase joined the Colorado National Guard in 1888. He was promoted to first lieutenant in 1895 and captain and major in 1897. In January 1901, Chase became a brigadier general of the Colorado National Guard.

=== Cripple Creek ===
During the Colorado Labor Wars, Chase was the commander of the National Guard forces in the Lake City, Cripple Creek and Trinidad strike districts. He came under extensive criticism for ordering mass arrests and detentions of strikers and others who spoke publicly in favor of the strikers or who criticized the National Guard. When a Colorado judge issued writs of habeas corpus for some of the detained prisoners, Chase sent the prisoners to the courthouse accompanied by 300 troops and posted a Gatling gun in front of the court house and sharpshooters on rooftops of the National Hotel and other buildings with a view of the courthouse. When the judge ordered the prisoners released, Chase refused to follow the order from the civil court until the Governor of Colorado directed him to do so. Chase was court-martialed for his actions, but Colorado Governor James H. Peabody restored him to the command of the National Guard.

=== Miners strikes of 1913–1914 ===
==== Chase and Mother Jones ====
From April 1909 to March 1916, Chase was the adjutant general of the State of Colorado. When labor unrest returned to the Colorado mines in 1913 and 1914, Chase led Colorado National Guard forces in occupation of the strike areas. He imposed martial law, deported strikers from the state, and enlisted mine guards into the National Guard. When the labor leader known as "Mother Jones" came to Colorado to support the striking workers, Chase initially arrested her and put her on a train heading out of the area with a warning not to return. When she returned to the area, Chase detained her for two months under armed guard at a local hospital and refused to allow her to be seen by visitors or a doctor. The detention of Mother Jones led to demonstrations, including one in which a hundred women surrounded Chase, demanding her release. Chase reportedly ordered his men to "ride down the women," and six of the women were injured in the incident. Jones later said of Chase, "His veins run with ice water."

==== Ludlow Massacre ====
In April 1914, violence between the striking miners and National Guard forces under Chase's command escalated. One writer who reviewed Chase's role in the violence noted:

Adjutant-General John Chase is in private life an oculist with an office in Denver. He is usually spoken of, even by his enemies, as a man of integrity. He impressed me as a narrow-minded man and something of an egotist. He believes intensely that he is right ... Chase doesn't believe in strikes and has no sympathy with the workingmen.

Deteriorating relations between the strikers and the National Guard were attributed in some accounts to the increased presence of former mine guards in the National Guard forces. The detention without charges of union members and sympathizers also added to the tension. A subordinate of Chase appeared in a court proceeding and stated, "It is a matter of supreme indifference to General Chase whether men arrested and held by him are guilty or innocent of a crime."

On the morning of April 20, 1914, the National Guard opened fire on the strikers at a tent colony occupied by 1,200 striking coal miners and their families at Ludlow, Colorado. The confrontation, which became known as the Ludlow Massacre, resulted in the death of 21 persons, including two women and eleven children who were asphyxiated when the tent colony was burned. The confrontation at Ludlow was the deadliest incident in the 14-month 1913-1914 Colorado Coal Strike, itself the deadliest strike in the history of the United States.

== Family and civic organizations ==
Chase was active in Freemasonry and reached the 32nd degree. He was also Knight Commander of the Court of Honor and grand marshal of the Conclave in 1912. He was also a member of the Sons of the American Revolution and served as the president of the organization' Colorado Society in 1906.

In August 1888, Chase married Anna Louise Sampson in the State of New York. They had six children: John Samson Chase (born March 18, 1890), Russell Chase, Anne (Chase) Carlson, David T. Chase, Kate T. (Chase) Reed, and Abigail Chase. At the time of the 1900 United States census, Chase lived at 923 Corona Street in Denver with his wife Anna, their five children, his parents (John M. and Alvina L. Chase), and a housekeeper, Kate London. His profession was listed at that time as an oculist. At the time of the 1910 United States census, Chase lived at the same location in Denver with his wife Anna, their six children, and one servant, Marquis Jordan. His profession was again listed as an oculist. He maintained his medical office at 412-415 Majestic Building in Denver.

Chase died in May 1918. The cause of death was reported as pneumonia.
