= Edmond H. Barmore =

American football player and businessman (1860–1931)

- Edmond H. Barmore
- Born: February 5, 1860; Jeffersonville, Indiana, U.S.
- Died: November 26, 1931 (aged 71); Los Angeles, California, U.S.
- Education: University of Michigan
- Known for: Football player/Businessman

Edmond Herbert Barmore (February 5, 1860 – November 26, 1931) was an American football player and businessman. He played for the first college football team at the University of Michigan in 1879 and was the first Michigan Wolverines football player to play at the quarterback position. He later went into the business of building steamships in Jeffersonville, Indiana, from 1881 to 1886. He moved to Los Angeles, California, in 1886, where he founded and operated the Los Angeles Transfer Company for approximately 40 years.

== Early years ==
Barmore was born in Jeffersonville, Indiana, on the banks of the Ohio River, in 1860. He was the son of Captain David S. Barmore (1832–1905) and Mary E. (Cash) Barmore. His father was one of the leading builders of steamboats used along the Ohio and Mississippi Rivers. He attended public schools in Indiana and Michigan.

== University of Michigan ==
Barmore in 1879

Barmore enrolled in the Literary Department at the University of Michigan in October 1878. In the spring of 1879, a group of students formed the university's first college football team. Barmore played at the halfback position on the 1879 Michigan Wolverines football team and participated in the first Michigan football team, a victory over Racine College played at White Stockings Park in Chicago. The following year, he played for the undefeated 1880 Michigan Wolverines football team and was the first Michigan Wolverines player to hold the position of quarterback. While attending Michigan, Barmore was also Director of the Athletic Association and a prize winner in long-distance running. He was also a member of the Zeta Psi fraternity at Michigan. Barmore left Michigan in June 1881.

== Business career ==
After leaving Michigan, Barmore joined his father in the boatbuilding business at Jeffersonville, Indiana, on the opposite shore of the Ohio River from Louisville, Kentucky. He and his father built all manner of riverboats, from small tugboats "to the large and powerful three and four-decked steamboats of modern commerce that ply the Ohio and Mississippi between Pittsburgh, St. Louis and New Orleans, carrying each its hundreds of passengers and thousands of tons of freight." From 1881 to 1886, Barmore and his father did business under the name D. S. Barmore and Son.

In 1886, Barmore and his father sold their business in Jeffersonville, and Barmore moved to Los Angeles, California. In Los Angeles, Barmore founded the Los Angeles Transfer Company. Barmore operated the Los Angeles Transfer Company as its sole owner for many years. The Los Angeles Times wrote that Barmore had a "practical monopoly" on the transfer business at railroad stations, but the long-established business experienced financial difficulties when Barmore expanded into the taxicab business. In July 1917, Barmore made an assignment of the business to three trustees for the benefit of the company's creditors. In December 1917, Barmore filed a voluntary bankruptcy petition in the United States District Court. He listed his total liabilities, as head of the company, as $231,933 against assets of approximately $175,000. The company continued through the bankruptcy, and Barmore retained ownership until 1926.

Barmore was a long-time member of the Jonathan Club in Los Angeles.

== Family and later years ==
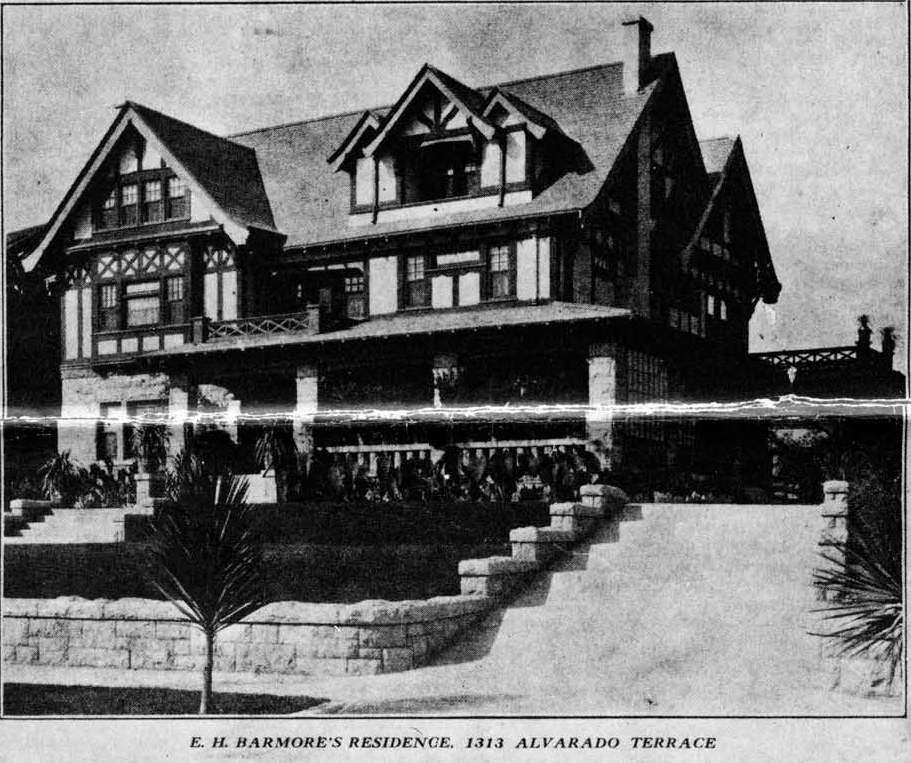
E. H. Barmore Residence, 1909

Barmore was married in July 1884 to Mary G. Downham. They had two children, Edmond H. Barmore Jr. and David S. Barmore. In 1908, Barmore purchased a large Craftsman style home with Tudor influences, including a three-gabled dormer, at 1317 Alvarado Terrace. In 1909, the house was featured on the cover of "Better City" (pictured at right) in a story about the fashionable new Alvarado Terrace neighborhood. The house, now known as the Boyle-Barmore House, is one of the designated properties in the Alvarado Terrace Historic District.

In November 1931, Barmore died at his home at 1545 West Ninth Street in Los Angeles. He had been in failing health for two years and became seriously ill two weeks before his death. He was buried at Rosedale Cemetery in Los Angeles and was survived by his wife, Mary G. Barmore, and his two sons.

== See also ==
- 1879 Michigan Wolverines football team
- 1880 Michigan Wolverines football team
