= 1881 CCNY Lavender football team =

American college football season

1881 CCNY Lavender football
- Conference: Independent
- Record: 1–1–1
- Head coach: None

1881 college football records
	Conf.			Overall
Team	W	L	T	W		L		T
MIT		–		3	–	0	–	0
Richmond		–		2	–	0	–	0
Georgetown		–		1	–	0	–	0
Yale		–		5	–	0	–	1
Princeton		–		7	–	0	–	2
Penn State		–		1	–	0	–	0
Columbian University		–		1	–	0	–	1
Dartmouth		–		1	–	0	–	1
Harvard		–		6	–	1	–	1
Massachusetts		–		2	–	1	–	1
Kentucky University		–		2	–	1	–	0
Columbia		–		3	–	3	–	1
Rutgers		–		2	–	4	–	1
Stevens		–		1	–	2	–	1
Kentucky State College		–		1	–	2	–	0
CCNY		–		1	–	1	–	1
Amherst		–		0	–	3	–	2
Lewisburg		–		0	–	1	–	0
Wesleyan		–		0	–	1	–	0
Randolph–Macon		–		0	–	2	–	0
Michigan		–		0	–	3	–	0
Penn		–		0	–	5	–	0

The 1881 CCNY Lavender football team represented the City College of New York during the 1881 college football season.

== Schedule ==
Date	Opponent	Site	Result	Source
	Fordham	New York, NY	W 4–0	
November 5	at Stevens	St. George's Cricket Club grounds; Hoboken, NJ	T 2–2	
November 17	at Rutgers	College Field; New Brunswick, NJ	L 0–10	
