= 1881 Penn Quakers football team =

American college football season

1881 Penn Quakers football
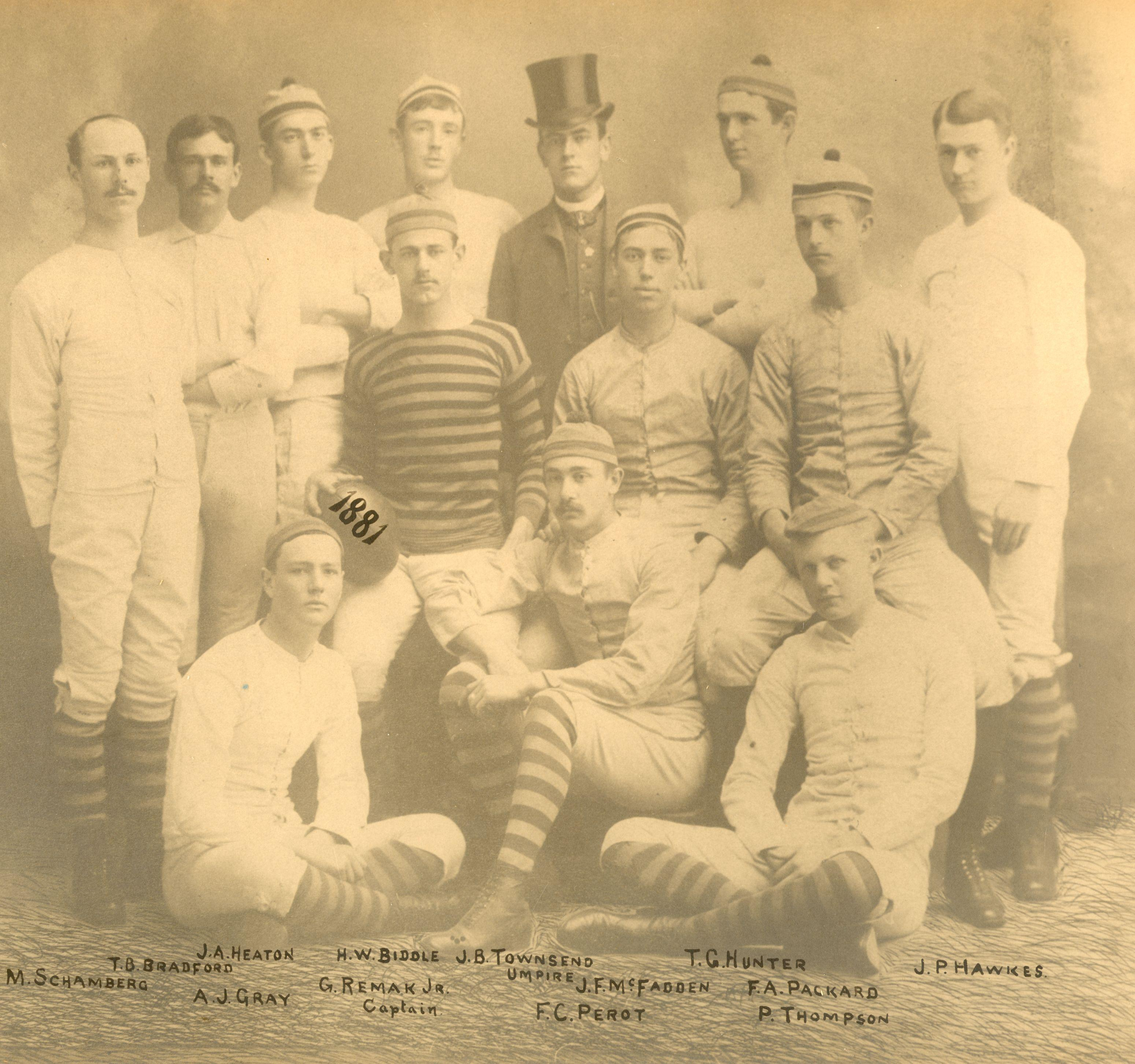
- Conference: Independent
- Record: 0–5
- Head coach: None
- Captain: Gustavus Remak
- Home stadium: Young America Cricket grounds

1881 college football records
	Conf.			Overall
Team	W	L	T	W		L		T
MIT		–		3	–	0	–	0
Richmond		–		2	–	0	–	0
Georgetown		–		1	–	0	–	0
Yale		–		5	–	0	–	1
Princeton		–		7	–	0	–	2
Penn State		–		1	–	0	–	0
Columbian University		–		1	–	0	–	1
Dartmouth		–		1	–	0	–	1
Harvard		–		6	–	1	–	1
Massachusetts		–		2	–	1	–	1
Kentucky University		–		2	–	1	–	0
Columbia		–		3	–	3	–	1
Rutgers		–		2	–	4	–	1
Stevens		–		1	–	2	–	1
Kentucky State College		–		1	–	2	–	0
CCNY		–		1	–	1	–	1
Amherst		–		0	–	3	–	2
Lewisburg		–		0	–	1	–	0
Wesleyan		–		0	–	1	–	0
Randolph–Macon		–		0	–	2	–	0
Michigan		–		0	–	3	–	0
Penn		–		0	–	5	–	0

The 1881 Penn Quakers football team represented the University of Pennsylvania in the 1881 college football season. The team finished with a 0–5 record, managing to only score a single point.

== Schedule ==
Date	Time	Opponent	Site	Result	Attendance	Source
October 29		Princeton	Philadelphia, PA (rivalry)	L 0–7		
November 2	3:36 p.m.	vs. Harvard	Polo Grounds; New York, NY (rivalry)	L 0–2	200	
November 5		at Princeton	Princeton, NJ	L 0–4		
November 19		Rutgers	Young America Cricket grounds; Philadelphia, PA	L 1–2		
November 26	2:40 p.m.	at Columbia	Polo Grounds; New York, NY	L 0–2		
