= 1881 Columbia football team =

American college football season

1881 Columbia football
- Conference: Independent
- Record: 3–3–1
- Head coach: None
- Captain: B. P. Clark
- Home stadium: Polo Grounds

1881 college football records
	Conf.			Overall
Team	W	L	T	W		L		T
MIT		–		3	–	0	–	0
Richmond		–		2	–	0	–	0
Georgetown		–		1	–	0	–	0
Yale		–		5	–	0	–	1
Princeton		–		7	–	0	–	2
Penn State		–		1	–	0	–	0
Columbian University		–		1	–	0	–	1
Dartmouth		–		1	–	0	–	1
Harvard		–		6	–	1	–	1
Massachusetts		–		2	–	1	–	1
Kentucky University		–		2	–	1	–	0
Columbia		–		3	–	3	–	1
Rutgers		–		2	–	4	–	1
Stevens		–		1	–	2	–	1
Kentucky State College		–		1	–	2	–	0
CCNY		–		1	–	1	–	1
Amherst		–		0	–	3	–	2
Lewisburg		–		0	–	1	–	0
Wesleyan		–		0	–	1	–	0
Randolph–Macon		–		0	–	2	–	0
Michigan		–		0	–	3	–	0
Penn		–		0	–	5	–	0

The 1881 Columbia football team represented Columbia University in the 1881 college football season. The team had no head coach, and compiled a record of 3–3–1. B. P. Clark served as team captain.

== Schedule ==
Date	Time	Opponent	Site	Result	Attendance	Source
October 31		at Stevens	Hoboken, NJ	W 3–1		
November 5	2:30 p.m.	at Harvard	Holmes Field; Cambridge, MA	L 0–1	2,000	
November 8		at Rutgers	New Brunswick, NJ	T 0–0		
November 12	2:38 p.m.	Princeton	Polo Grounds; New York, NY	L 0–1		
November 16		Yale	Polo Grounds; New York, NY	L 0–1		
November 23	2:00 p.m.	Rutgers	Polo Grounds; New York, NY	W 1–0		
November 26	2:40 p.m.	Penn	Polo Grounds; New York, NY	W 2–0		
