= Collins H. Johnston =

American football player, medical doctor, surgeon, and civic leader (1859–1936)

Collins H. Johston
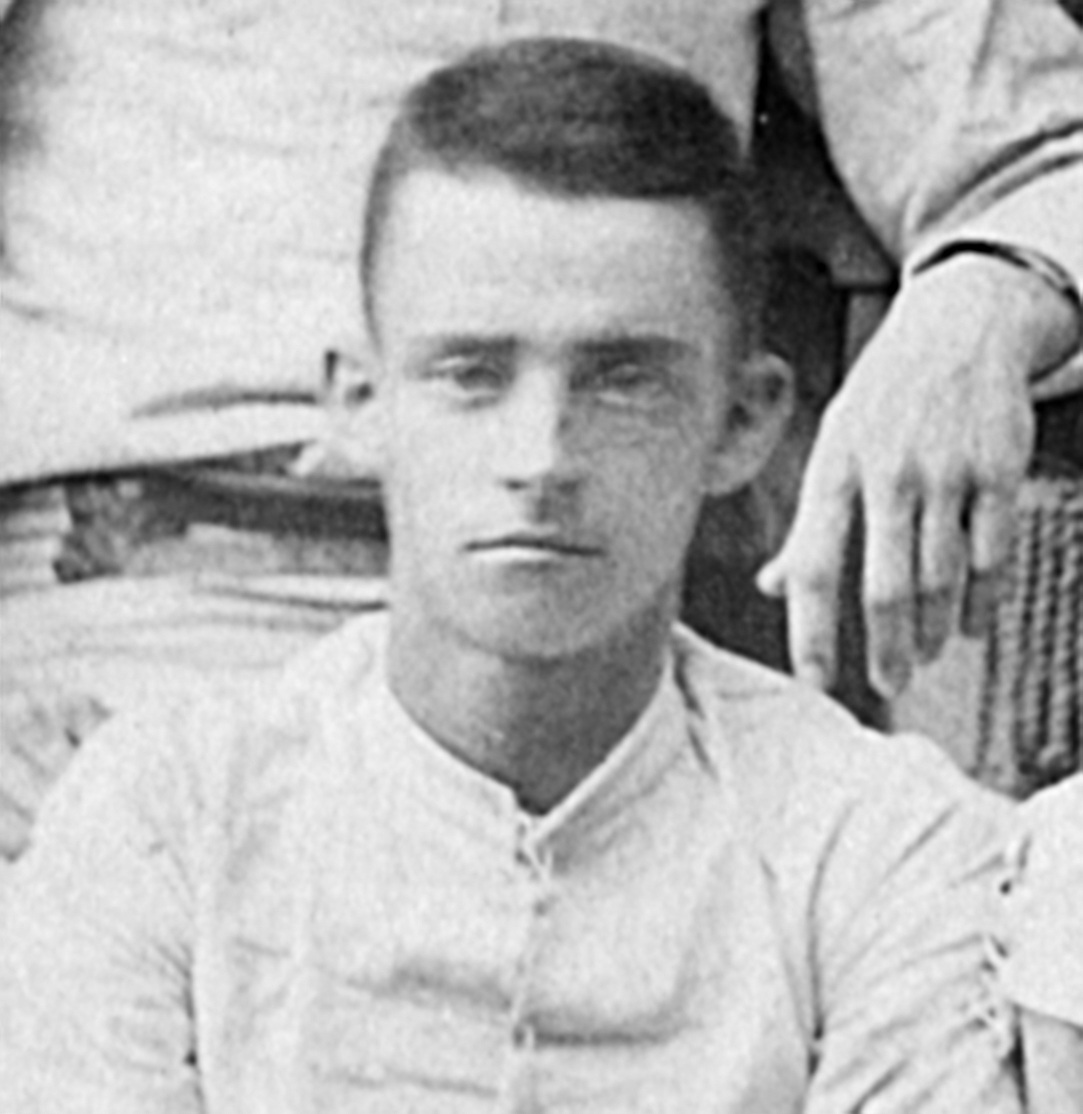
- Collins H. Johnston, 1879
- Born: August 29, 1859; Detroit, Michigan
- Died: December 29, 1936 (aged 77)
- Citizenship: United States
- Education: University of Michigan
- Known for: Medical doctor and football player
- Spouse: Almira (Sutton) Johnston
- Children: Bessie S. (born 1881), Carolyn A. (born 1884), George S. (born 1892), Katherine Sarah (born 1896), and Collins H., Jr. (born 1900)

Collins Hickey Johnston (August 29, 1859 – December 29, 1936) was an American football player, medical doctor, surgeon, and civic leader in Grand Rapids, Michigan. He was a graduate of the University of Michigan where he played college football for the 1879 Michigan Wolverines football team, the first football team to represent the University of Michigan.

== Early years ==
Johnston was born at Detroit, Michigan, in 1859. He received his preparatory education at Amherst, Massachusetts, and at Ann Arbor High School. He enrolled in the literary department at the University of Michigan in approximately 1877 and received a bachelor's degree in 1881. He received his doctor of medicine degree there in 1883. While studying at Michigan, Johnston also played at the halfback position for the 1879 Michigan Wolverines football team, the first football team to represent the University of Michigan. He also played for the 1880 team. He was also the vice president of the Student Athletic Association.

== Medical career ==
After graduating from Michigan, Johnston was the assistant house surgeon at Detroit's Harper Hospital during the summer of 1883. He next practiced medicine at Suttons Bay, Michigan, from 1883 to 1886. He was also the health officer for Suttons Bay Township for two years. From 1886 to 1887, he undertook postgraduate study at the New York Polyclinic and the Northwestern Dispensary in New York. He established a medical practice in Grand Rapids, Michigan, in August 1887. He served as the district surgeon for the Grand Trunk Railway and the New York Central Railroad. He was also physician at the Michigan Masonic Home, surgeon to the Butterworth Hospital, president of the Michigan State Anti-Tuberculosis Society, and a member of the Michigan State Board of Health.

Johnston was a member of the House of Delegates of the American Medical Association in 1908, secretary of the Michigan State Medical Society, a fellow of the American College of Physicians, and a member of the American Clinical and Climatological Association. He also served on the Grand Rapids Board of Education (1898–1900) and the Grand Rapids Board of Health. Johnston regularly published papers in medical journals, examples of which include the following:

- "A Case of Acute Inflammation of the Middle Ear - Extensive Mastoid Caries, Without Local Signs of Inflammation or Pyemia - Death," Transactions of the Michigan State Medical Society, 1892.
- "Puerperal Eclampsia: Report of Eight Cases," Transactions of the Michigan State Medical Society, 1896.
- "Diagnosis of Typhoid Fever," The Clinical Review, November 1898.
- "The Diagnosis of Typhoid Fever," Physician and Surgeon: A Professional Medical Journal, December 1898.
- "Some Eminent Physicians of Ancient Times," Physician and Surgeon: A Professional Medical Journal, July 1899.
- "Typhoid Fever," Physician and Surgeon: A Professional Medical Journal, November 1900.
- "Administrative Control of Tuberculosis," 1909.
- "Differential Diagnosis between Functional and Organic Cardiac Murmurs," 1917.
- "Cardiac Conditions That Do Not Disqualify for Army Service," Transactions of the American Climatalogical Association, 1918.
- "Artificial Pneumothorax in Acute Tuberculous Pneumonia, Acute Pulmonary Abscess and Pulmonary Hemorrhage," Transactions of the American Clinical and Climatalogical Association, 1921.

== Family and death ==
In August 1881, Johnston was married to Almira Sutton, a native of Ann Arbor, Michigan (born November 29, 1859). They had five children: Bessie S. (born 1881), Carolyn A. (born 1884), George S. (born 1892), Katherine Sarah (born 1896), and Collins H., Jr. (born 1900). Collins died in December 1936 at age 77 from coronary thrombosis and arteriosclerosis.
