= 1881 Yale Bulldogs football team =

American college football season

1881 Yale Bulldogs football
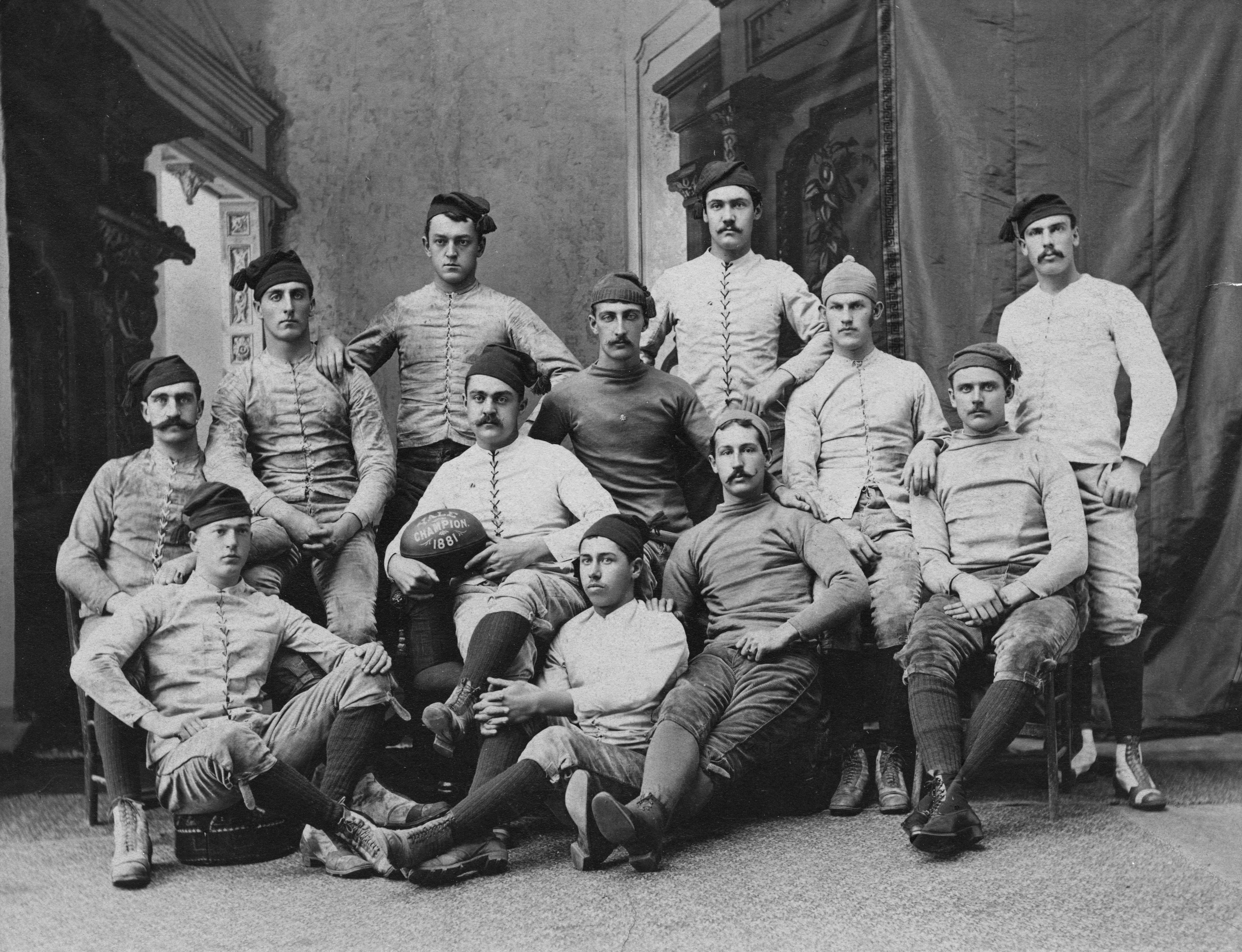

National champion (NCF) Co-national champion (Davis)
- Conference: Independent
- Record: 5–0–1
- Head coach: None
- Captain: Franklin M. Eaton
- Home stadium: Hamilton Park

1881 college football records
| | Conf. | | | Overall |
| Team | W | L | T | W | | L | | T |
|---|---|---|---|---|---|---|---|---|
| MIT | | – | | 3 | – | 0 | – | 0 |
| Richmond | | – | | 2 | – | 0 | – | 0 |
| Georgetown | | – | | 1 | – | 0 | – | 0 |
| Yale | | – | | 5 | – | 0 | – | 1 |
| Princeton | | – | | 7 | – | 0 | – | 2 |
| Penn State | | – | | 1 | – | 0 | – | 0 |
| Columbian University | | – | | 1 | – | 0 | – | 1 |
| Dartmouth | | – | | 1 | – | 0 | – | 1 |
| Harvard | | – | | 6 | – | 1 | – | 1 |
| Massachusetts | | – | | 2 | – | 1 | – | 1 |
| Kentucky University | | – | | 2 | – | 1 | – | 0 |
| Columbia | | – | | 3 | – | 3 | – | 1 |
| Rutgers | | – | | 2 | – | 4 | – | 1 |
| Stevens | | – | | 1 | – | 2 | – | 1 |
| Kentucky State College | | – | | 1 | – | 2 | – | 0 |
| CCNY | | – | | 1 | – | 1 | – | 1 |
| Amherst | | – | | 0 | – | 3 | – | 2 |
| Lewisburg | | – | | 0 | – | 1 | – | 0 |
| Wesleyan | | – | | 0 | – | 1 | – | 0 |
| Randolph–Macon | | – | | 0 | – | 2 | – | 0 |
| Michigan | | – | | 0 | – | 3 | – | 0 |
| Penn | | – | | 0 | – | 5 | – | 0 |

The 1881 Yale Bulldogs football team represented Yale University in the 1881 college football season. The team compiled a 5–0–1 record, did not allow opposing teams to score a single point, outscored all opponents, 10–0, and was retroactively named co-national champions by the National Championship Foundation and Parke H. Davis.

== Schedule ==
| Date | Time | Opponent | Site | Result | Attendance | Source |
|---|---|---|---|---|---|---|
| October 29 | 2:30 p.m. | at Amherst | Amherst, MA | W 2–0 | | |
| November 2 | | Michigan | Hamilton Park; New Haven, CT | W 2–0 | 600 | |
| November 5 | | Amherst | Hamilton Park; New Haven, CT | W 4–0 | | |
| November 12 | 2:40 p.m. | Harvard | Hamilton Park; New Haven, CT (rivalry) | W 1–0 | 1,500 | |
| November 16 | | at Columbia | Polo Grounds; New York, NY | W 1–0 | | |
| November 24 | | vs. Princeton | Polo Grounds; New York, NY (rivalry) | T 0–0 | 10,000 | |

== Roster ==
- Rushers: Howard H. Knapp, Arthur L. Farwell, Ray Tompkins, Louis K. Hull, Charles Bigelow Storrs, Franklin M. Eaton, Charles S. Beck
- Quarterback: Walter Irving Badger
- Halfbacks: Eugene Lamb Richards, Walter Camp
- Back: Benjamin Wisner Bacon
