= 1881 Kentucky State College football team =

American college football season

1881 Kentucky State College football
- Conference: Independent
- Record: 1–2
- Head coach: None

1881 college football records
	Conf.			Overall
Team	W	L	T	W		L		T
MIT		–		3	–	0	–	0
Richmond		–		2	–	0	–	0
Georgetown		–		1	–	0	–	0
Yale		–		5	–	0	–	1
Princeton		–		7	–	0	–	2
Penn State		–		1	–	0	–	0
Columbian University		–		1	–	0	–	1
Dartmouth		–		1	–	0	–	1
Harvard		–		6	–	1	–	1
Massachusetts		–		2	–	1	–	1
Kentucky University		–		2	–	1	–	0
Columbia		–		3	–	3	–	1
Rutgers		–		2	–	4	–	1
Stevens		–		1	–	2	–	1
Kentucky State College		–		1	–	2	–	0
CCNY		–		1	–	1	–	1
Amherst		–		0	–	3	–	2
Lewisburg		–		0	–	1	–	0
Wesleyan		–		0	–	1	–	0
Randolph–Macon		–		0	–	2	–	0
Michigan		–		0	–	3	–	0
Penn		–		0	–	5	–	0

The 1881 Kentucky State College football team represented Kentucky State College—now known as the University of Kentucky—during the 1881 college football season. The team compiled a record of 1–2. The 1881 season was Kentucky's first football season, and after this season, they would not play again until 1891.

== Schedule ==
In 1881, gridiron football had not fully separated from the other forms of football, and some scoring systems (including those used in Kentucky) scored touchdowns as a quarter of a goal/point.

Date	Opponent	Site	Result	Source
November 12	vs. Kentucky University (Note: now known as Transylvania University)	Lexington, KY (rivalry)	W 7¼–1	
November 19	vs. Kentucky University	Lexington, KY	L 1–2	
December 3	vs. Kentucky University	Lexington, KY	L 2½–3¾	
