= 1880 Harvard Crimson football team =

American college football season

1880 Harvard Crimson football
- Conference: Independent
- Record: 2–2–2
- Head coach: None
- Captain: William H. Manning
- Home stadium: Boston Baseball Grounds

1880 college football records
	Conf.			Overall
Team	W	L	T	W		L		T
Princeton		–		4	–	0	–	1
Yale		–		4	–	0	–	1
Kentucky University		–		2	–	0	–	0
Michigan		–		1	–	0	–	0
Harvard		–		2	–	2	–	2
Penn		–		2	–	2	–	0
Rutgers		–		2	–	2	–	0
Columbia		–		1	–	2	–	0
Amherst		–		0	–	1	–	1
Massachusetts		–		0	–	1	–	1
Stevens		–		1	–	4	–	0
Brown		–		0	–	1	–	0
CCNY		–		0	–	1	–	0
Philadelphia Crescent AC		–		0	–	1	–	0
Toronto		–		0	–	1	–	0
Centre		–		0	–	2	–	0

The 1880 Harvard Crimson football team represented Harvard University in the 1880 college football season. The team finished with a 2–2–2 record.

On November 6, 1880, Harvard defeated Columbia 3–0 before a crowd of about 300 who paid 50 cents to watch the game at the Polo Grounds in New York.

Also at the Polo Grounds one week later, Harvard lost to Princeton with an attendance of between 3,000 and 4,000. Princeton scored two goals and held Harvard to one goal. Princeton also had five touchdowns for safety to two for Harvard. The Sun of New York reported that the game, played under the new 1880 rules of the Intercollegiate Football Association, was football in name only, but "in reality a series of wrestling encounters for possession of a large leather globe."

== Schedule ==
Date	Time	Opponent	Site	Result	Attendance	Source
October 23	3:15 p.m.	Britannia Football Club	Boston Baseball Grounds; Boston, MA	W 2–0		
November 1	3:15 p.m.	at Ottawa Football Club	Rideau Hall Cricket Ground; Ottawa, ON	W 2–1		
November 2	3:00 p.m.	at Montreal Football Club	Cricket Ground; Montreal, QC	T 0–0		
November 6	3:15 p.m.	at Columbia	Polo Grounds; New York, NY	W 3–0	300	
November 13	2:45 p.m.	vs. Princeton	Polo Grounds; New York, NY (rivalry)	L 1–2	1,500–4,000	
November 20	2:45 p.m.	Yale	Boston Baseball Grounds; Boston, MA (rivalry)	L 0–1	700	
