= 1881 college football season =

American college football season

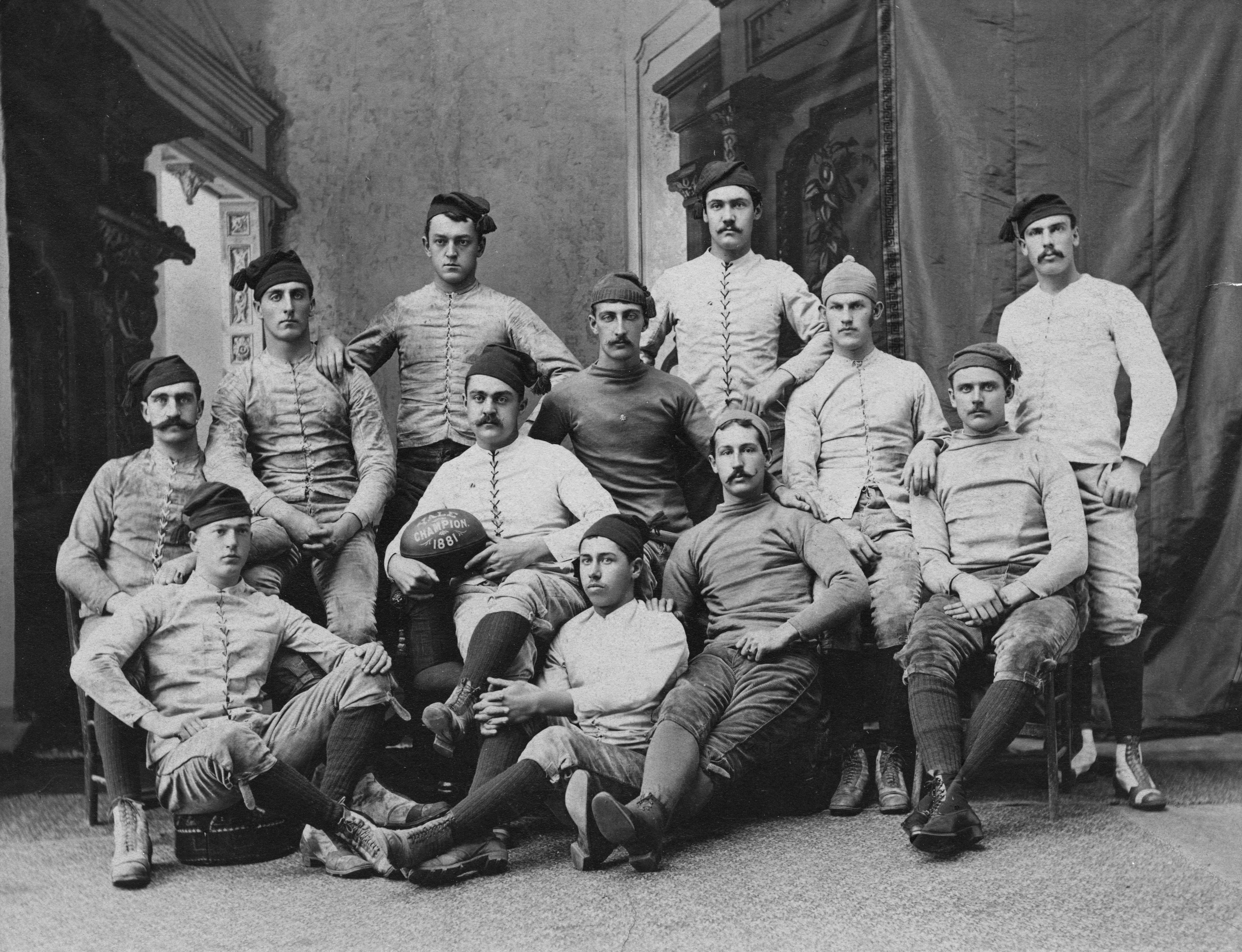
- 1881 Yale Bulldogs
- Total No. of teams: 22
- Champion(s): Princeton; Yale

The 1881 college football season had no clear-cut champion, with the Official NCAA Division I Football Records Book listing Princeton and Yale as having been selected national champions.

== Conference and program changes ==
| Team | Former conference | New conference |
|---|---|---|
| Richmond Colts | Program established | Independent |
| Georgetown | Program established | Independent |
| Penn State | Program established | Independent |
| Columbian University | Program established | Independent |
| Dartmouth | Program established | Independent |
| Kentucky State College | Program established | Independent |
| Lewisburg | Program established | Independent |
| MIT Engineers | Program established | Independent |
| Randolph–Macon Yellow Jackets | Program established | Independent |

== Conference standings ==
1881 college football records
| | Conf. | | | Overall |
| Team | W | L | T | W | | L | | T |
|---|---|---|---|---|---|---|---|---|
| MIT | | – | | 3 | – | 0 | – | 0 |
| Richmond | | – | | 2 | – | 0 | – | 0 |
| Georgetown | | – | | 1 | – | 0 | – | 0 |
| Yale | | – | | 5 | – | 0 | – | 1 |
| Princeton | | – | | 7 | – | 0 | – | 2 |
| Penn State | | – | | 1 | – | 0 | – | 0 |
| Columbian University | | – | | 1 | – | 0 | – | 1 |
| Dartmouth | | – | | 1 | – | 0 | – | 1 |
| Harvard | | – | | 6 | – | 1 | – | 1 |
| Massachusetts | | – | | 2 | – | 1 | – | 1 |
| Kentucky University | | – | | 2 | – | 1 | – | 0 |
| Columbia | | – | | 3 | – | 3 | – | 1 |
| Rutgers | | – | | 2 | – | 4 | – | 1 |
| Stevens | | – | | 1 | – | 2 | – | 1 |
| Kentucky State College | | – | | 1 | – | 2 | – | 0 |
| CCNY | | – | | 1 | – | 1 | – | 1 |
| Amherst | | – | | 0 | – | 3 | – | 2 |
| Lewisburg | | – | | 0 | – | 1 | – | 0 |
| MIT | | – | | 3 | – | 0 | – | 0 |
| Wesleyan | | – | | 0 | – | 1 | – | 0 |
| Randolph–Macon | | – | | 0 | – | 2 | – | 0 |
| Michigan | | – | | 0 | – | 3 | – | 0 |
| Penn | | – | | 0 | – | 5 | – | 0 |
