= Eugene Lamb Richards =

American football player, lawyer, and politician (1863–1927)

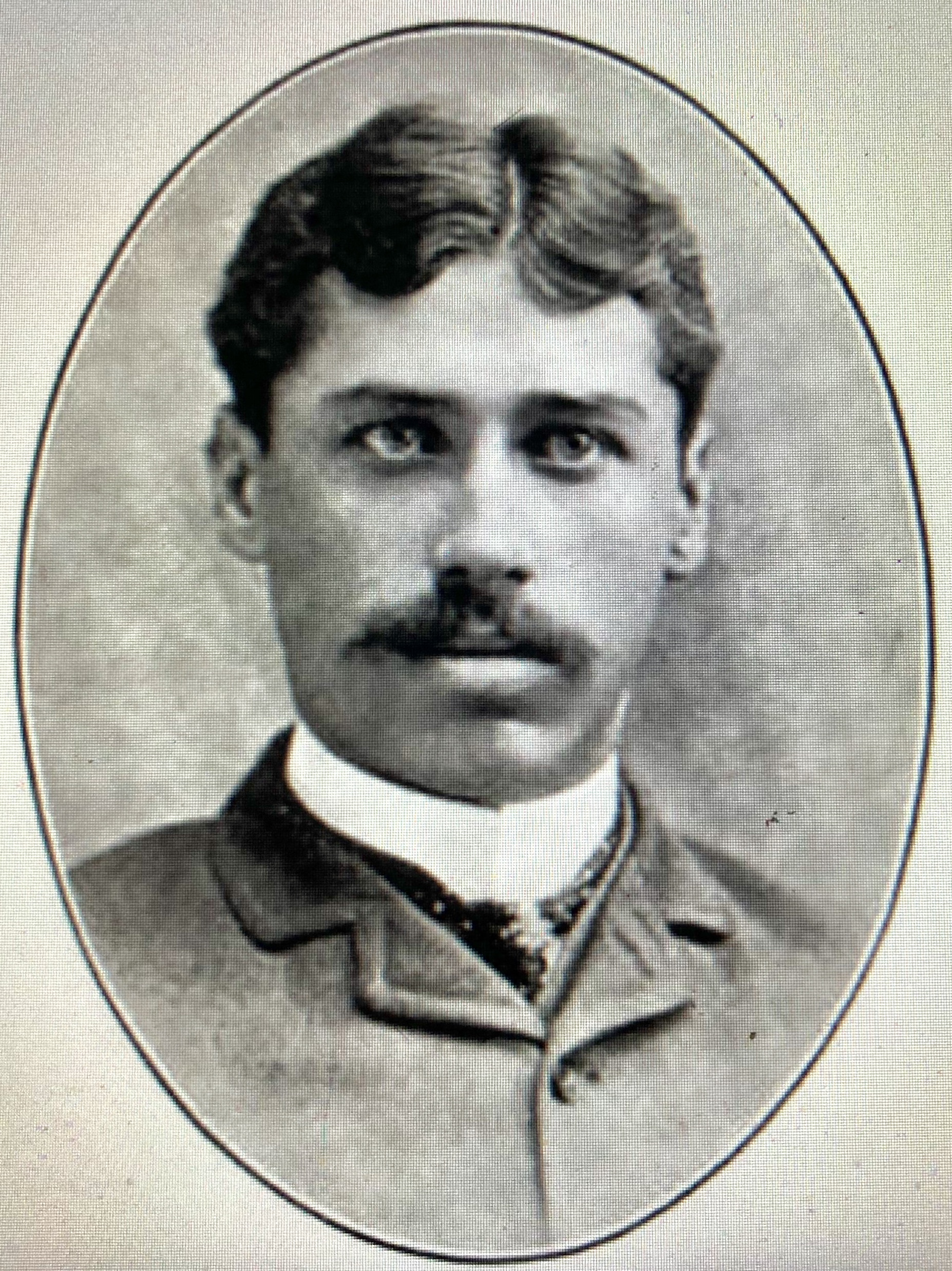

Yale Bulldogs
- Position: Halfback

Personal information
- Born: June 14, 1863; New Haven, Connecticut, U.S.
- Died: September 17, 1927 (aged 64); Woodbridge, Connecticut, U.S.

Career information
- College: Yale (1881–1884)

Awards and highlights
- National championship (1881, 1882, 1883, 1884)

Eugene Lamb Richards Jr. (June 14, 1863 – September 17, 1927) was an American college football player, lawyer, and politician.

== Early life ==
Richards was born on June 14, 1863, in New Haven, Connecticut. He was the son of Julia L. (née Bacon) Richards and Eugene Lamb Richards Sr., a Yale professor.

While at Yale, he was a halfback on the undefeated 1881, 1882, 1883, and 1884 Yale Bulldogs football teams that have been recognized for winning four consecutive national championships. He was the captain of the 1884 team. He set a Yale record in May 1883 by kicking a football 168 feet.

== Career ==
Richards later became a lawyer who was actively involved in Tammany Hall politics. He held state offices in New York, including Deputy Attorney General and Bank Commissioner.
