= 1880 Penn Quakers football team =

American college football season

1880 Penn Quakers football
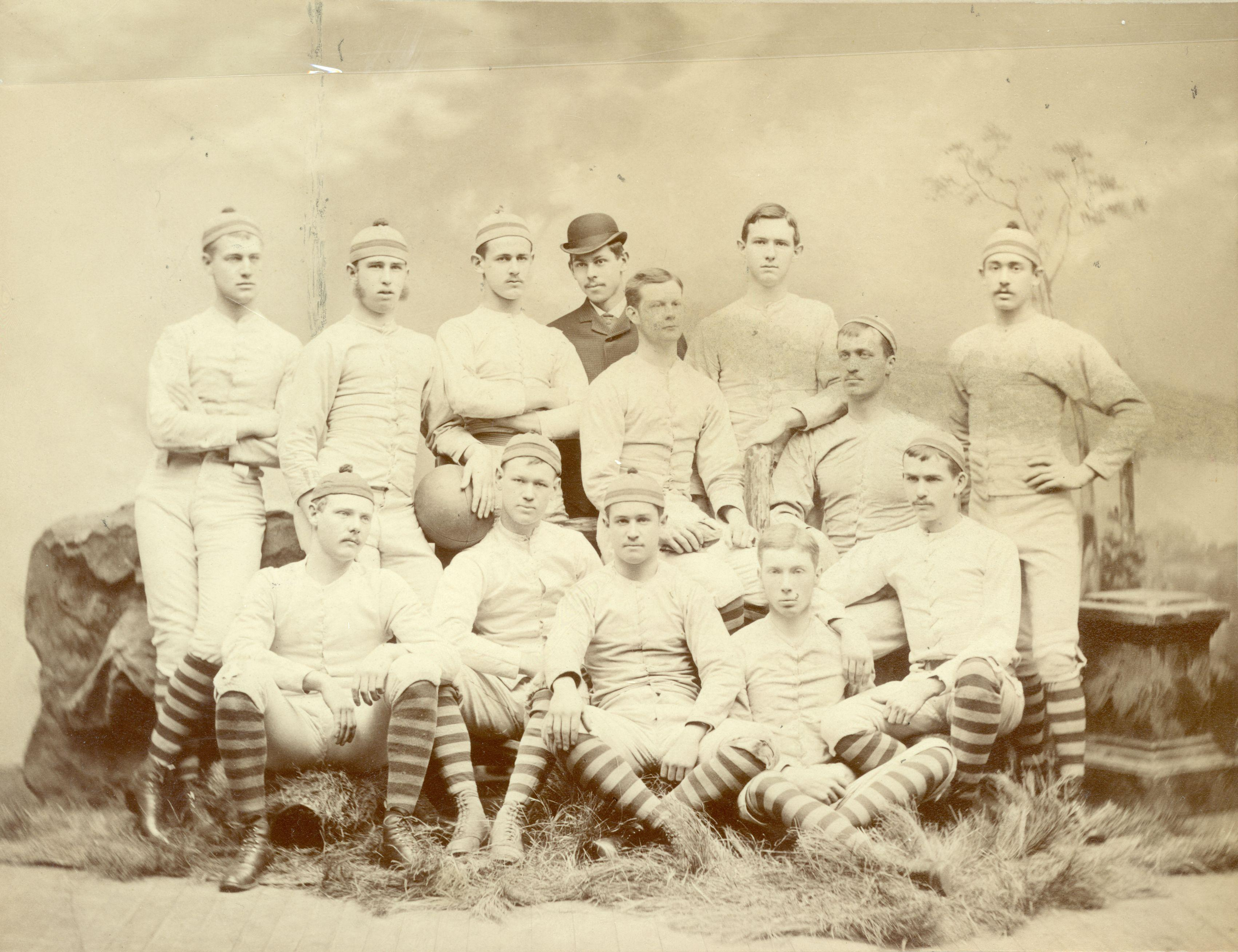
- Conference: Independent
- Record: 2–2
- Head coach: None
- Captain: George Thayer

1880 college football records
	Conf.			Overall
Team	W	L	T	W		L		T
Princeton		–		4	–	0	–	1
Yale		–		4	–	0	–	1
Kentucky University		–		2	–	0	–	0
Michigan		–		1	–	0	–	0
Harvard		–		2	–	2	–	2
Penn		–		2	–	2	–	0
Rutgers		–		2	–	2	–	0
Columbia		–		1	–	2	–	0
Amherst		–		0	–	1	–	1
Massachusetts		–		0	–	1	–	1
Stevens		–		1	–	4	–	0
Brown		–		0	–	1	–	0
CCNY		–		0	–	1	–	0
Philadelphia Crescent AC		–		0	–	1	–	0
Toronto		–		0	–	1	–	0
Centre		–		0	–	2	–	0

The 1880 Penn Quakers football team represented the University of Pennsylvania in the 1880 college football season. The team finished with a 2–2 record.

== Schedule ==
Date	Time	Opponent	Site	Result	Attendance	Source
October 23		Philadelphia Crescent Athletic Club	Philadelphia, PA	W 5–0		
November 6		at Princeton	Princeton, NJ (rivalry)	L 0–1		
November 13	11:10 a.m.	at Stevens	St. George's Cricket Club grounds; Hoboken, NJ	W 3–0		
November 17		vs. Yale	Polo Grounds; New York, NY	L 0–8	500	
