= 1880 Centre football team =

American college football season

1880 Centre football
- Conference: Independent
- Record: 0–2
- Head coach: Samuel L. McKee (1st season)

1880 college football records
	Conf.			Overall
Team	W	L	T	W		L		T
Princeton		–		4	–	0	–	1
Yale		–		4	–	0	–	1
Kentucky University		–		2	–	0	–	0
Michigan		–		1	–	0	–	0
Harvard		–		2	–	2	–	2
Penn		–		2	–	2	–	0
Rutgers		–		2	–	2	–	0
Columbia		–		1	–	2	–	0
Amherst		–		0	–	1	–	1
Massachusetts		–		0	–	1	–	1
Stevens		–		1	–	4	–	0
Brown		–		0	–	1	–	0
CCNY		–		0	–	1	–	0
Philadelphia Crescent AC		–		0	–	1	–	0
Toronto		–		0	–	1	–	0
Centre		–		0	–	2	–	0

The 1880 Centre football team represented Centre College of Danville, Kentucky as an independent in the 1880 college football season. This was Centre's first season of play. The team's first game, played against Kentucky University on April 9, 1880, at Stoll Field in Lexington, Kentucky, was the first college football game played in the state of Kentucky. The game is also claimed as the first college football game ever played in the Southern United States, though VMI and Washington and Lee played a game in Lexington, Virginia in 1873. The game was said to have resembled a combination of soccer and rugby. Centre lost both its games this season to Kentucky University, now known as Transylvania University.

== Schedule ==
Date	Opponent	Site	Result
April 9	at Kentucky University	cow pasture/Stoll Field; Lexington, KY	L 13¾–0
April 16	Kentucky University	cow pasture; Danville, KY	L 5½–0

== See also ==
- List of the first college football game in each US state
