= 1881 Penn State football team =

American college football season

1881 Penn State football
- Conference: Independent
- Record: 1–0
- Head coach: None

1881 college football records
	Conf.			Overall
Team	W	L	T	W		L		T
MIT		–		3	–	0	–	0
Richmond		–		2	–	0	–	0
Georgetown		–		1	–	0	–	0
Yale		–		5	–	0	–	1
Princeton		–		7	–	0	–	2
Penn State		–		1	–	0	–	0
Columbian University		–		1	–	0	–	1
Dartmouth		–		1	–	0	–	1
Harvard		–		6	–	1	–	1
Massachusetts		–		2	–	1	–	1
Kentucky University		–		2	–	1	–	0
Columbia		–		3	–	3	–	1
Rutgers		–		2	–	4	–	1
Stevens		–		1	–	2	–	1
Kentucky State College		–		1	–	2	–	0
CCNY		–		1	–	1	–	1
Amherst		–		0	–	3	–	2
Lewisburg		–		0	–	1	–	0
Wesleyan		–		0	–	1	–	0
Randolph–Macon		–		0	–	2	–	0
Michigan		–		0	–	3	–	0
Penn		–		0	–	5	–	0

The 1881 Penn State football team was an American football team that represented Pennsylvania State College—now known as Pennsylvania State University–during the 1881 college football season. It was the first football team fielded by the school. Penn State played only one game in 1881, beating Lewisburg by a score of 9–0. Although this game was reported in the two State College newspapers and The Mirror, the University at Lewisburg campus newspaper, Bucknell denies that this game ever happened. Penn State did not field teams from 1882 through 1886.

== Schedule ==
Date	Opponent	Site	Result
November 12	at Lewisburg	Lewisburg, PA	W 9–0
