= 1881 Michigan Wolverines football team =

American college football season

1881 Michigan Wolverines football
- Conference: Independent
- Record: 0–3
- Head coach: None
- Captain: Walter S. Horton
- Home stadium: None

1881 college football records
	Conf.			Overall
Team	W	L	T	W		L		T
MIT		–		3	–	0	–	0
Richmond		–		2	–	0	–	0
Georgetown		–		1	–	0	–	0
Yale		–		5	–	0	–	1
Princeton		–		7	–	0	–	2
Penn State		–		1	–	0	–	0
Columbian University		–		1	–	0	–	1
Dartmouth		–		1	–	0	–	1
Harvard		–		6	–	1	–	1
Massachusetts		–		2	–	1	–	1
Kentucky University		–		2	–	1	–	0
Columbia		–		3	–	3	–	1
Rutgers		–		2	–	4	–	1
Stevens		–		1	–	2	–	1
Kentucky State College		–		1	–	2	–	0
CCNY		–		1	–	1	–	1
Amherst		–		0	–	3	–	2
Lewisburg		–		0	–	1	–	0
Wesleyan		–		0	–	1	–	0
Randolph–Macon		–		0	–	2	–	0
Michigan		–		0	–	3	–	0
Penn		–		0	–	5	–	0

The 1881 Michigan Wolverines football team represented the University of Michigan in the 1881 college football season. While the University of Michigan had fielded "football" teams in 1879 and 1880, those teams played a game that was more in line with traditional rugby, and many consider the 1881 team to be the first at Michigan to play American football. The team finished with a record of 0–3 after playing the top teams in the country – Harvard, Yale and Princeton.

== Schedule ==
Date	Time	Opponent	Site	Result	Attendance	Source
October 31	3:15 p.m.	at Harvard	South End Grounds; Boston, MA	L 0–4	100	
November 2		at Yale	Hamilton Park; New Haven, CT	L 0–11	600	
November 4		at Princeton	Princeton, NJ	L 4–13		

== Season overview ==
The 1881 season was only the third during which Michigan fielded a football team. Prior to 1881, Michigan had played only three games, two against the University of Toronto and one against Racine College in Chicago. Moreover, the game played by Michigan was more in the nature of British rugby rather than American football. One author has observed: "When the Michigan rugby team went East in November of 1881 they were playing a more traditional rugby game than their eastern counterparts."

The players on the Michigan team came from throughout the western states, including Illinois (Frank Wormwood and team captain and quarterback Walter S. Horton), Iowa (Richard Dott and Fred Townsend), North Dakota (the DePuy brothers), the Upper Peninsula (fullback William J. Olcott), and even Florida (Purl Woodruff).

In 1881, Michigan scheduled games against the top American football teams—the Eastern powerhouses of Harvard, Yale and Princeton. Every year between 1870 and 1893, only Yale, Princeton, or Harvard has been credited with the consensus or shared national championship except Columbia in 1875. Retrospective historical power ratings have ranked them as the top three college football teams of 1881. The Michigan-Harvard game, which was played on Halloween 1881, was the first time any of the elite Eastern teams had played a team from the West. In his history of college football, David M. Nelson cites Michigan's 1881 Eastern trip as the origin of intersectional football: "In 1881 football became an intersectional game with the University of Michigan invading the East to play Harvard, Princeton and Yale."

Michigan played all three games in the East over a five-day period between October 31, 1881, and November 4, 1881. While Michigan lost all three games, the games were close, and the Michigan team earned the respect of the Eastern press. Forward Fred Townsend wrote about the trip in 1901, saying:

We were a lot of inexperienced players, without team work, depending entirely on individual play. Our half-backs, I believe, were equal to any we met, but our line was weak, the men being light and having little experience. Most of us had never played in a match game and some of us had never seen a copy of the rules.

Having lost all of its games and being outscored 28–4, the 1881 Michigan team holds the distinction of having the worst record in the school's history—a record that has not been matched in the more than 125 years of football that followed. After the 1881 season, Michigan did not schedule any intercollegiate games in 1882 and did not return to intercollegiate play until 1883.

== Press accounts of the games ==
=== October 31: Harvard 4, Michigan 0 ===
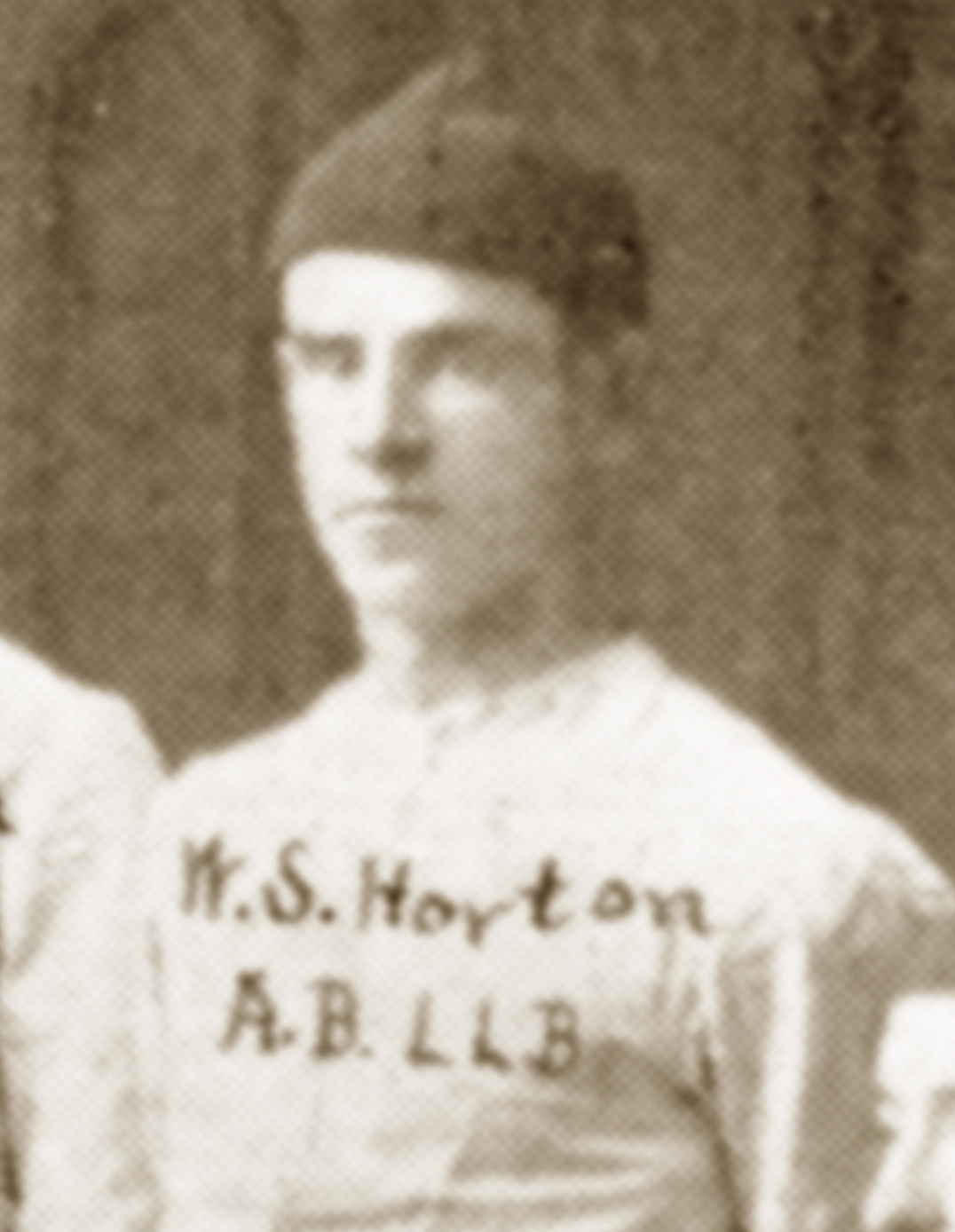
Walter S. Horton, captain of Michigan's 1881 football team

The Boston Journal carried a lengthy article about the Michigan-Harvard game, which it summarized as follows:

"Yesterday afternoon, in a drenching rain, for the first time an Eastern foot-ball eleven played with a Western eleven. The Western college boys have long wished a chance to try their powers with Eastern opponents, and, to effect this, the University of Michigan this fall have sent on a representative eleven to play the largest of the Eastern colleges. Their first opponent were the Harvard team. They were beaten but with fair weather the result would have been very uncertain. As it was, Harvard won more by luck than by superiority in strength or skill, for with the exception of the first ten minutes they were forced to play a defensive game. ... At 3:15, in the midst of a drenching rain, the game began. Perhaps a hundred spectators had by this time gathered."

Harvard scored the only points of the game in the first half on a play that was disputed by Michigan's players. The Boston Journal noted:

"Individual players kept losing their temper, and much time was wasted in upclose quarreling over little questions of no account. If the Westerners hadn't talked so much they might have won, or at least tied the game. ... During the second half hour the ball was near the Harvard line constantly. Once it came within three feet of the chalk, but the most desperate fighting on the Harvard forced it back foot by foot until the immediate danger was over. ... The Michigan team excelled in running, and their tackling was very fair. As to passing, they did very little. It was by all odds the best game seen in Boston this fall."

Another Massachusetts paper, The Fitchburg Sentinel, reported: "The Harvard university football team won one touch-down at Cambridge, Monday, and the Michigan university team won nothing."

=== November 2: Yale 11, Michigan 0 ===
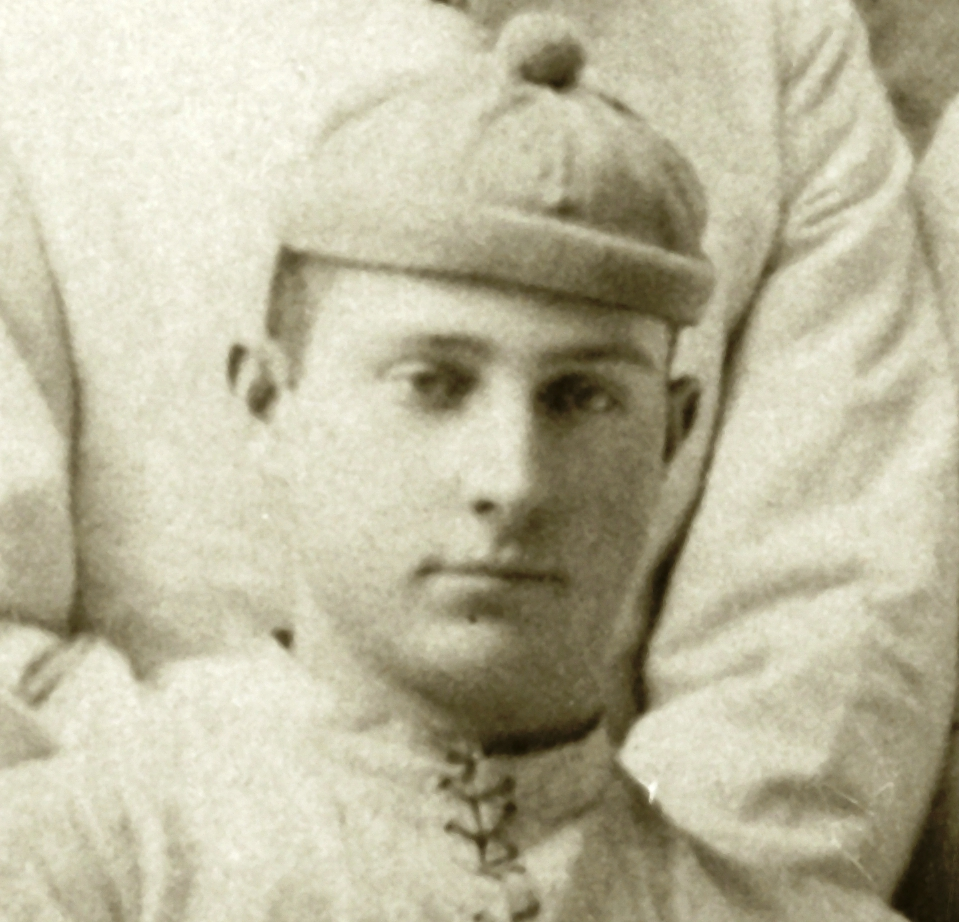
William J. Olcott, fullback from Ishpeming, Michigan

Michigan's worst defeat on the Eastern trip was an 11–0 defeat against Yale. The next day, the New Haven Evening Register carried the following account of the game:

"The Yale foot ball team easily defeated the players from the University of Michigan at Hamilton Park, yesterday afternoon, in the presence of 500 people. The Yales outplayed their opponents in every particular, and kept the ball near their goal during the greater part of the game. ... The score was: Yale, 2 goals, University of Michigan, no goals, Touchdowns for safety: Yale none, University of Michigan 8. Olcott and DePuy played a good game for the visitors."

=== November 4: Princeton 13, Michigan 4 ===
The final game of the trip was a 13–4 loss to Princeton. One New Jersey newspaper reported: "The Princeton College team were victorious Thursday in a football match with the team of the University of Michigan after an exciting struggle." New Jersey's Daily State Gazette wrote: "A finely contested game of football at the University grounds Friday, between Princeton and University of Michigan resulted in a victory for the home team, Princeton 1 goal, 2 touchdowns; University of Michigan 0."

== Players ==
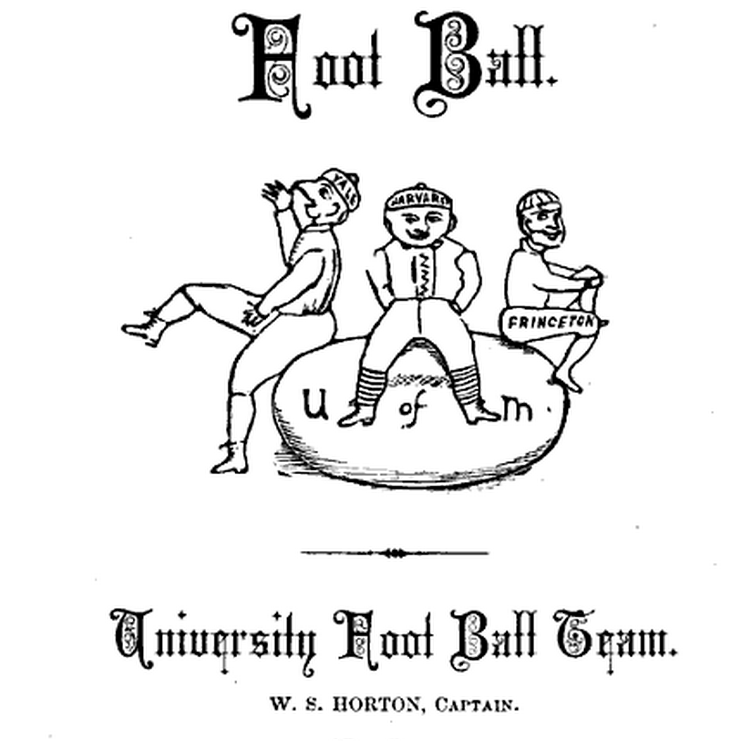
1881 Michigan Football Team Profile from "The Palladium"

The following players were members of the 1881 football team according to the roster published in the 1882 edition of "The Palladium", the University of Michigan yearbook.

Forwards

- John Ayres, Springville, Michigan
- Harry Bitner, Mt. Carroll, Illinois
- Fredric M. Townsend, Albia, Iowa
- Charles M. Wilson, Ionia, Michigan
- Purl G. Woodruff, Westville, Florida

Quarterback

- Walter S. Horton, Peoria, Illinois (also the team captain)

Halfbacks

- Richard G. DePuy from Jamestown, North Dakota
- Richard Millard Dott, halfback, Sioux City, Iowa
- Frank Forbes Wormwood from Rockford, Illinois

Three-Quarter-back

- William J. Olcott from Ishpeming, Michigan

Goalkeeper

- Thomas Gilmore, Chicago, Illinois

Substitutes

- Henry S. Mahon, Ann Arbor, Michigan
- William DePuy, Jamestown, North Dakota
