= Robert W. Watson =

Robert W. Watson (December 26, 1925 - February 27, 2012) was an American poet and academic. He was born in Passaic, New Jersey. He attended Williams College and Johns Hopkins University, where he received a doctoral degree in 1955. From 1953 to his retirement in 1987, he served as a member of the English Department at the University of North Carolina at Greensboro. He was the main architect of the Master of Fine Arts in Creative Writing program at UNCG. The program is considered one of the best in the nation. In 1966, Watson and graduate writing student Lawrence Judson Reynolds began the Greensboro Review, a respected literary journal that has since earned a national reputation.

Some of Watson’s awards and honors include: the American Scholar Poetry Prize (1959), a National Endowment of the Arts Fellowship (1974-1975), and the American Academy and Institute of Arts and Letters Award (1977).

In 1980, he authored an article, published as "Media Martyrdom" in Harper's Magazine and excerpted as "The Other Side of the Greensboro Shootout" in the Washington Post, in which he defended the Ku Klux Klan for their actions in the Greensboro massacre.
