= Fred Townsend =

American football player, lawyer, and politician (1862–1918)

- Born: July 1, 1862; Albia, Iowa
- Died: November 21, 1918 (aged 56); Albia, Iowa
- Education: University of Michigan
- Known for: Football player, lawyer, and politician

Frederick Townsend (July 1, 1862 – November 21, 1918) was an American football player, lawyer and politician.

Townsend was born in 1862 at Albia, Iowa. He was the son of John Selby Townsend, a district judge and legislator in Iowa. Townsend received his early education in the public school of Albia, Iowa. In 1879, he enrolled at Ann Arbor High School, but he was forced to quit his studies in the spring of 1881 due to failing eyesight.

In the fall of 1881, Townsend entered the law department at the University of Michigan. He played forward for the Michigan football team and wrote an account of the team's trip to the east coast to play Harvard, Yale, and Princeton. He entered the freshman class of the literary department in the spring of 1882. He was again unable to complete his studies due to failing eyesight. He moved to El Paso, Texas, where he worked in the mercantile business and also part-time in the law office of his brother, Judge J. E. Townsend. He returned to Iowa in 1887 and was admitted to the Iowa bar in May 1887. In the fall of 1887, he resumed his studies at the law department of the University of Michigan. He played as a starting left tackle for the 1887 Michigan Wolverines football team while completing his legal studies. He graduated from Michigan in 1888 and returned to El Paso where he formed a law partnership with his brother under the name Townsend & Townsend.

In August 1889, he married Helen Dawson, a classmate of Townsend at the University of Michigan, in a ceremony held at Minneapolis, Minnesota. They had five children. He returned to Albia, Iowa, in 1890 and began a law practice there. In 1890, he was nominated as the Democratic Party's candidate for County Attorney of Monroe County, Iowa. He was elected and served in that capacity from 1891 to 1893. He next served as chairman of the Monroe County Democratic Party for three years. In 1896, he was elected to the state central committee of the Iowa Democratic Party, and in 1898, he was chosen as the chairman of the state central committee. He next served two terms in the Iowa State Senate from 1900 to 1904. He also served on the local school and library boards and on the Board of Equalization and Fuel Commission for Monroe County. Townsend was a member of the Masons, the Knights of Pythias, and the Elks. He died in November 1918 from the Spanish influenza during the 1918 flu pandemic.
