= Walter S. Horton =

American football player and lawyer (1857–1944)

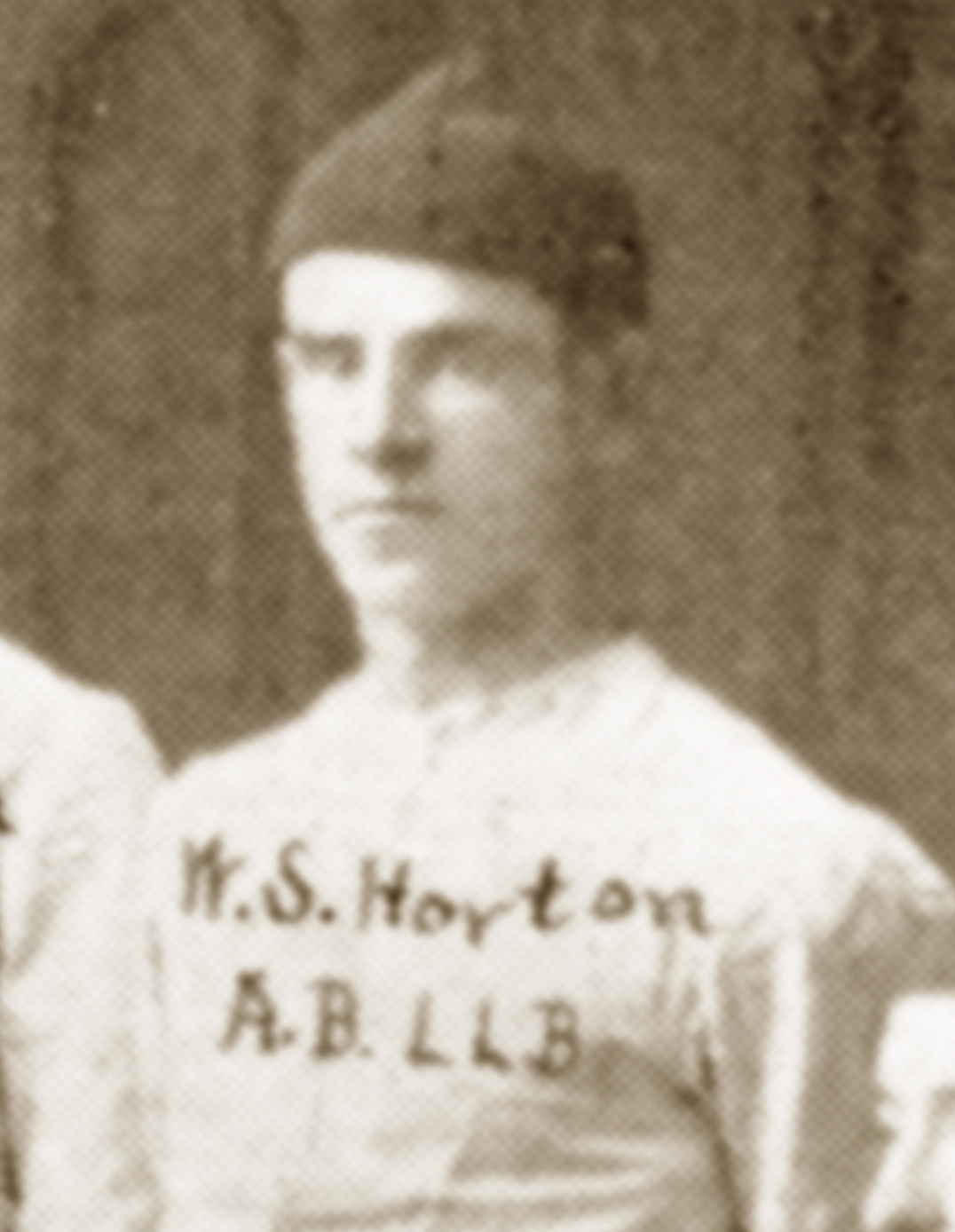
- Walter S. Horton, 1880
- Born: December 3, 1857; Illinois, United States
- Died: March 13, 1944 (aged 86); Peoria, Illinois
- Education: University of Michigan
- Known for: Football player/Lawyer

Walter Shurts Horton (December 3, 1857 – March 13, 1944) was an American football player and lawyer. A native of Delavan, Illinois, Horton attended Princeton University and graduated in 1879. He subsequently studied law at the University of Michigan, graduating from the Department of Law in 1882. While attending Michigan, Horton played college football. He played at the halfback position for the 1880 team and was the team captain and quarterback for the 1881 Michigan Wolverines football team. He was a prominent attorney in Illinois for some 50 years. He was a delegate from Illinois to the 1908 Republican National Convention. From 1909 to 1928, he was the general counsel in Chicago for the Illinois Central Railroad. He died in March 1944 at age 86 in Peoria, Illinois.
