= 1875 college football season =

American college football season

- Total No. of teams: 11
- Champion(s): Princeton; Columbia; Harvard

The 1875 college football season had no clear-cut champion, with the Official NCAA Division I Football Records Book listing Columbia, Harvard, and Princeton as having been selected national champions. Only Princeton claims a national championship for this season.

== Conference and program changes ==
Team	Former conference	New conference
Wesleyan Methodists	Program established	Independent
Bates Bobcats	Program established	Independent
Canada All-Stars	Program established	Independent

== Conference standings ==
1875 college football records
	Conf.			Overall
Team	W	L	T	W		L		T
Harvard		–		4	–	0	–	0
Princeton		–		2	–	0	–	0
Columbia		–		4	–	1	–	1
Rutgers		–		1	–	1	–	1
Yale		–		2	–	2	–	0
Stevens		–		3	–	3	–	0
Tufts		–		0	–	1	–	0
NYU		–		0	–	1	–	0
Wesleyan		–		0	–	1	–	0
Bates		–		0	–	1	–	0
Canada All-Stars		–		0	–	2	–	0
CCNY		–		0	–	3	–	0

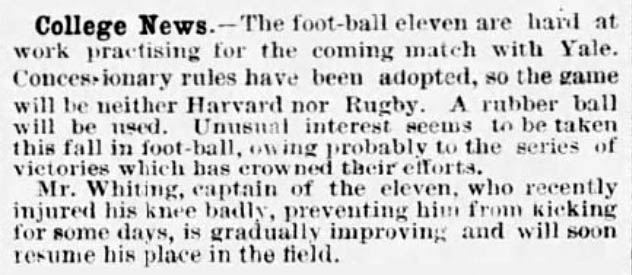
News about the Harvard v Yale game played under the "concessionary rules" in 1875

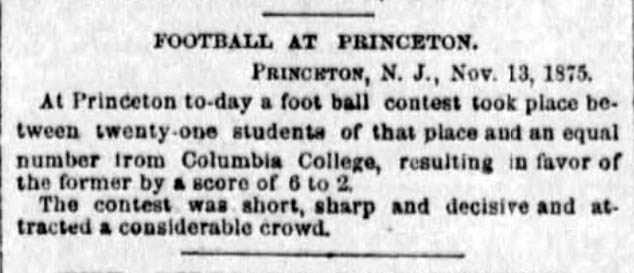
Chronicle of the Princeton v Columbia match, won by Princeton 6–2
