= 1877 college football season =

American college football season

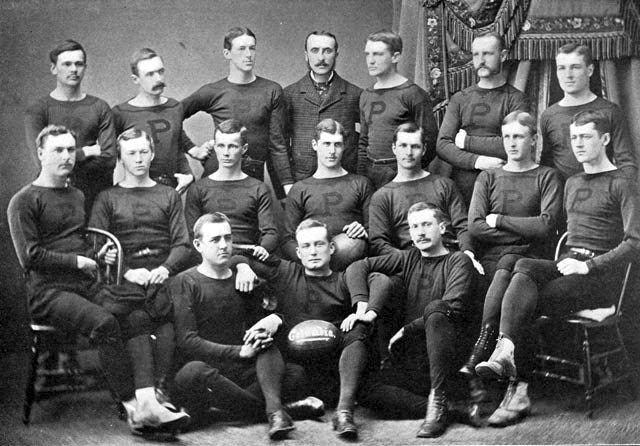
- 1877 Princeton team
- Total No. of teams: 8
- Regular season: October 27 to December 8
- Champion(s): Princeton; Yale

The 1877 college football season had no clear-cut champion, with the Official NCAA Division I Football Records Book listing Yale and Princeton as having been selected national champions.

== Conference and program changes ==
Team	Former conference	New conference
Amherst	Program established	Independent

== Conference standings ==
1877 college football records
	Conf.			Overall
Team	W	L	T	W		L		T
Yale		–		3	–	0	–	1
Princeton		–		2	–	0	–	1
Amherst		–		1	–	0	–	0
Harvard		–		3	–	1	–	0
Columbia		–		2	–	2	–	0
Rutgers		–		1	–	2	–	0
Stevens		–		1	–	3	–	0
Tufts		–		0	–	3	–	0
