= 1875 Yale Bulldogs football team =

American college football season

1875 Yale Bulldogs football
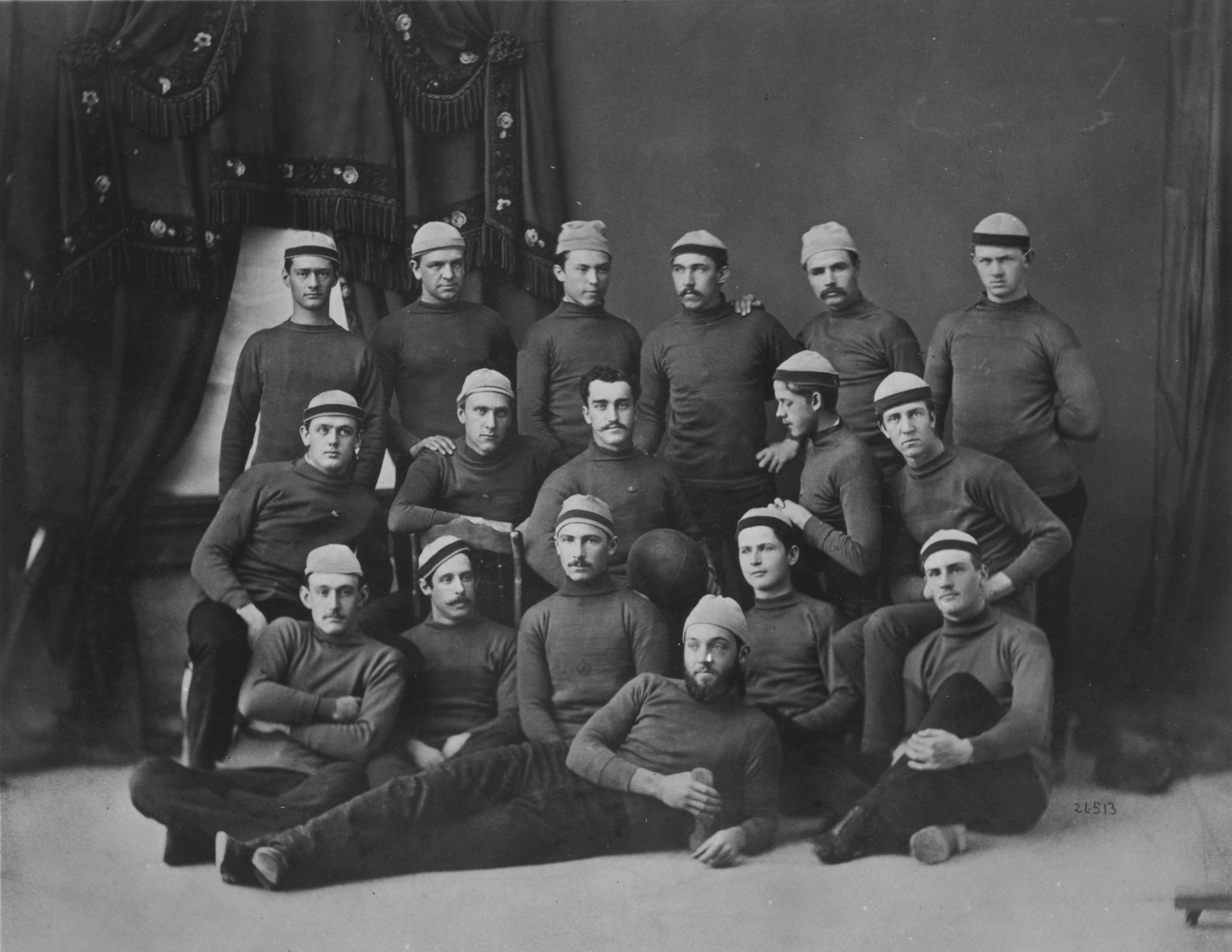
- Conference: Independent
- Record: 2–2
- Head coach: None
- Captain: William Arnold
- Home stadium: Hamilton Park

1875 college football records
	Conf.			Overall
Team	W	L	T	W		L		T
Harvard		–		4	–	0	–	0
Princeton		–		2	–	0	–	0
Columbia		–		4	–	1	–	1
Rutgers		–		1	–	1	–	1
Yale		–		2	–	2	–	0
Stevens		–		3	–	3	–	0
Tufts		–		0	–	1	–	0
NYU		–		0	–	1	–	0
Wesleyan		–		0	–	1	–	0
Bates		–		0	–	1	–	0
Canada All-Stars		–		0	–	2	–	0
CCNY		–		0	–	3	–	0

The 1875 Yale Bulldogs football team represented Yale University in the 1875 college football season. The Bulldogs finished with a 2–2 record. The team won games against Rutgers and Wesleyan and lost to Harvard and Columbia.

In this season, the first Yale vs Harvard contest was held, two years after the inaugural Yale vs Princeton football contest. Harvard athlete Nathaniel Curtis challenged Yale's captain, William Arnold, to a rugby-style game. The next season Curtis was captain. He took one look at Walter Camp, then only 156 pounds, and told Yale captain Gene Baker "You don't mean to let that child play, do you? . . . He will get hurt."

The two teams agreed to play under a set of rules called the "Concessionary Rules", which involved Harvard conceding something to Yale's soccer and Yale conceding a great deal to Harvard's rugby. The game featured a round ball instead of a rugby-style oblong ball, and caused Yale to drop association football in favor of rugby.

== Schedule ==
Date	Opponent	Site	Result	Source
November 6	Rutgers	Hamilton Park; New Haven, CT	W 4–1	
November 13	Harvard	Hamilton Park; New Haven, CT (rivalry)	L 0–4	
November 20	Wesleyan	Hamilton Park; New Haven, CT	W 6–0	
December 4	Columbia	Hamilton Park; New Haven, CT	L 2–3	

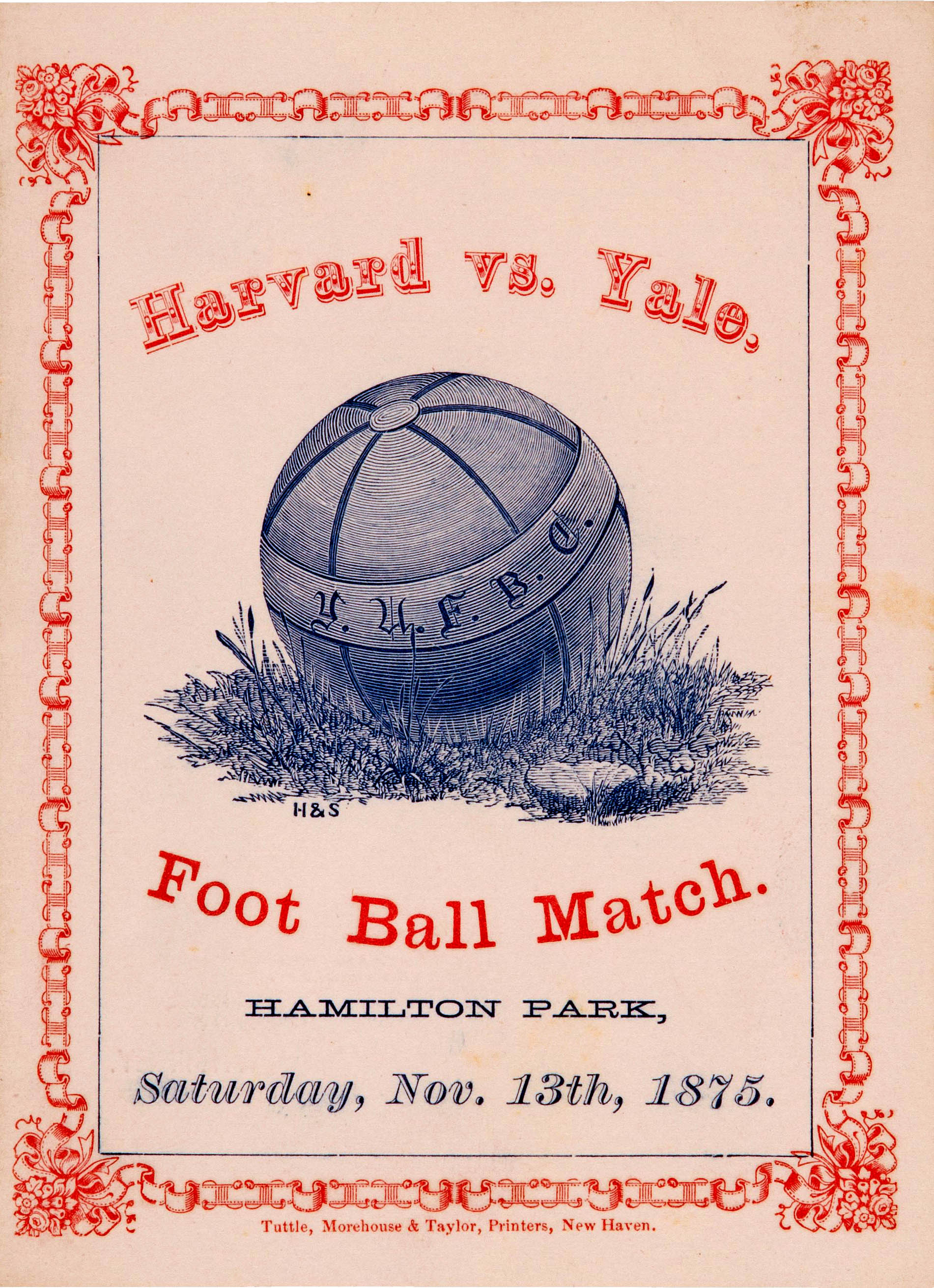
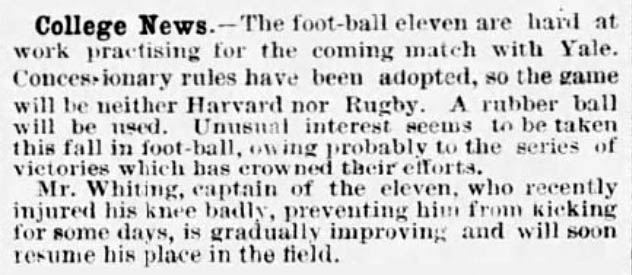
Left: Program for the "Foot Ball Match", Harvard versus Yale, the first intercollegiate rugby football game between Ivy League teams. The two teams played with 15 players on a side;
right: News about the Harvard v Yale game played under the "concessionary rules" in 1875. It is considered the first rugby-style game in the US

== See also ==
- Yale Rugby
