= 1876 college football season =

American college football season

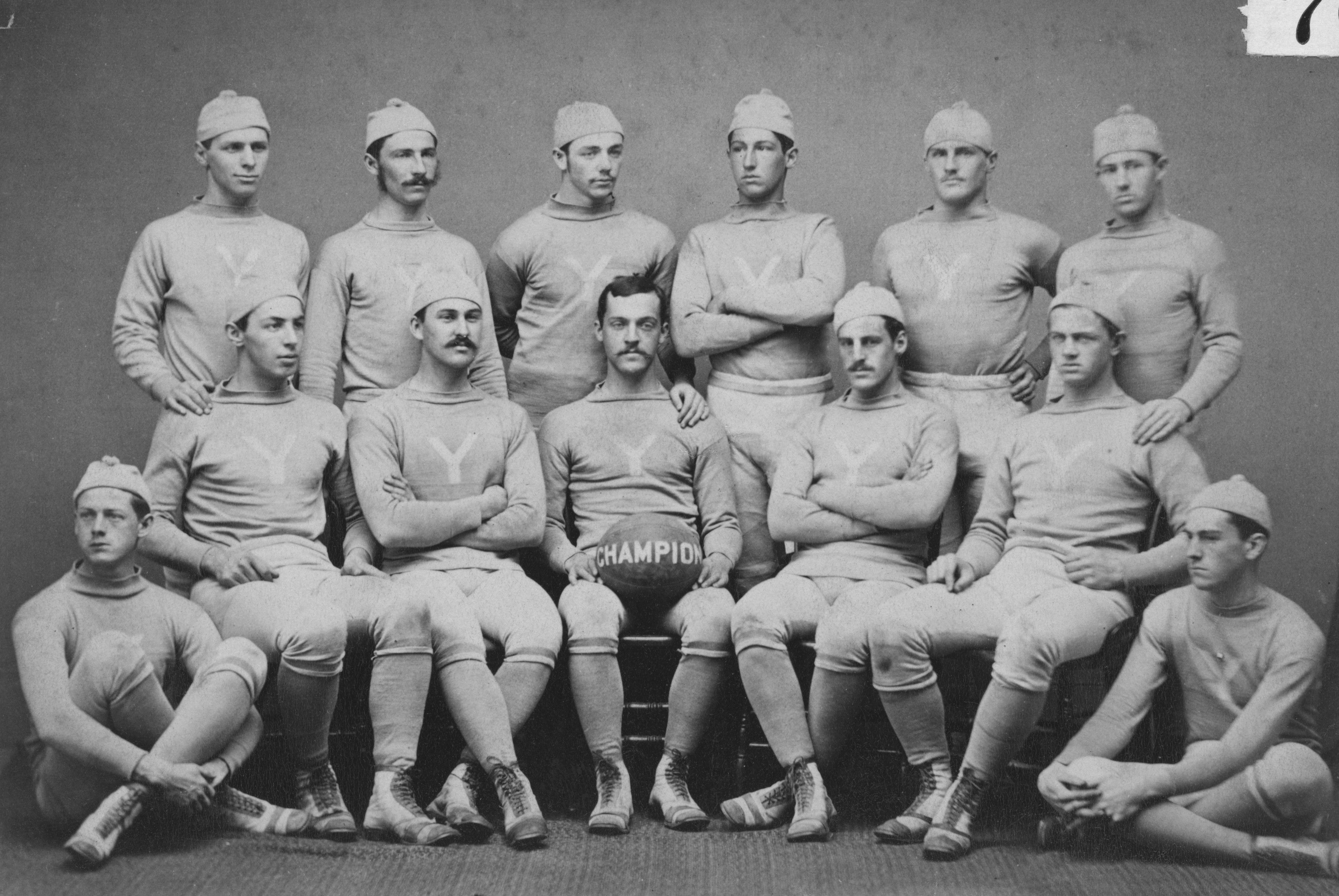
- 1876 Yale team
- Total No. of teams: 13
- Regular season: November 1, 1876 to March 3, 1877
- Champion: Yale

The 1876 college football season had no clear-cut champion, with the Official NCAA Division I Football Records Book listing Yale as having been selected national champions. On November 11, organized intercollegiate football was first played in the state of Pennsylvania as Princeton defeated Penn 6–0 in Philadelphia. This season was notable in the history of American football as it saw Walter Camp, widely considered to be the "Father" of the sport, participate as a freshman on the Yale team.

== Conference and program changes ==
Team	Former conference	New conference
Penn Quakers	Program established	Independent
Northwestern	Program established	Independent
Philadelphia All-Stars	Program established	Independent

== Conference standings ==
1876 college football records
	Conf.			Overall
Team	W	L	T	W		L		T
Yale		–		3	–	0	–	0
Rutgers		–		1	–	0	–	0
Harvard		–		3	–	1	–	0
Princeton		–		3	–	2	–	0
Stevens		–		2	–	2	–	0
CCNY		–		1	–	1	–	0
Penn		–		1	–	2	–	0
Columbia		–		1	–	3	–	0
Canada All-Stars		–		0	–	1	–	0
McGill		–		0	–	1	–	0
Northwestern		–		0	–	1	–	0
Philadelphia All-Stars		–		0	–	1	–	0
NYU		–		0	–	2	–	0
