= 1878 Rutgers Queensmen football team =

American college football season

1878 Rutgers Queensmen football
- Conference: Independent
- Record: 1–2–1
- Head coach: None
- Captain: Thomas Fitz-Randolph
- Home stadium: College Field

1878 college football records
	Conf.			Overall
Team	W	L	T	W		L		T
Princeton		–		6	–	0	–	0
Yale		–		4	–	1	–	1
Columbia		–		0	–	0	–	1
CCNY		–		1	–	1	–	0
Stevens		–		1	–	1	–	2
Harvard		–		1	–	2	–	0
Penn		–		1	–	2	–	1
Rutgers		–		1	–	2	–	1
Amherst		–		1	–	3	–	0
Brown		–		0	–	1	–	0
Swarthmore		–		0	–	1	–	0

The 1878 Rutgers Queensmen football team represented Rutgers University in the 1878 college football season. The Queensmen compiled a 1–2–1 record, scored one point, and allowed six points.

The team had no coach, and its captain was Thomas Fitz-Randolph.

== Schedule ==
Date	Opponent	Site	Result	Source
October 29	Stevens	New Brunswick, NJ	T 0–0	
November 2	at Princeton	Princeton, NJ (rivalry)	L 0–5	
November 9	at Stevens	St. George's Cricket Club grounds; Hoboken, NJ	L 0–1	
December 7	CCNY	New Brunswick, NJ	W 6–0	
