= 1878 Harvard Crimson football team =

American college football season

1878 Harvard Crimson football
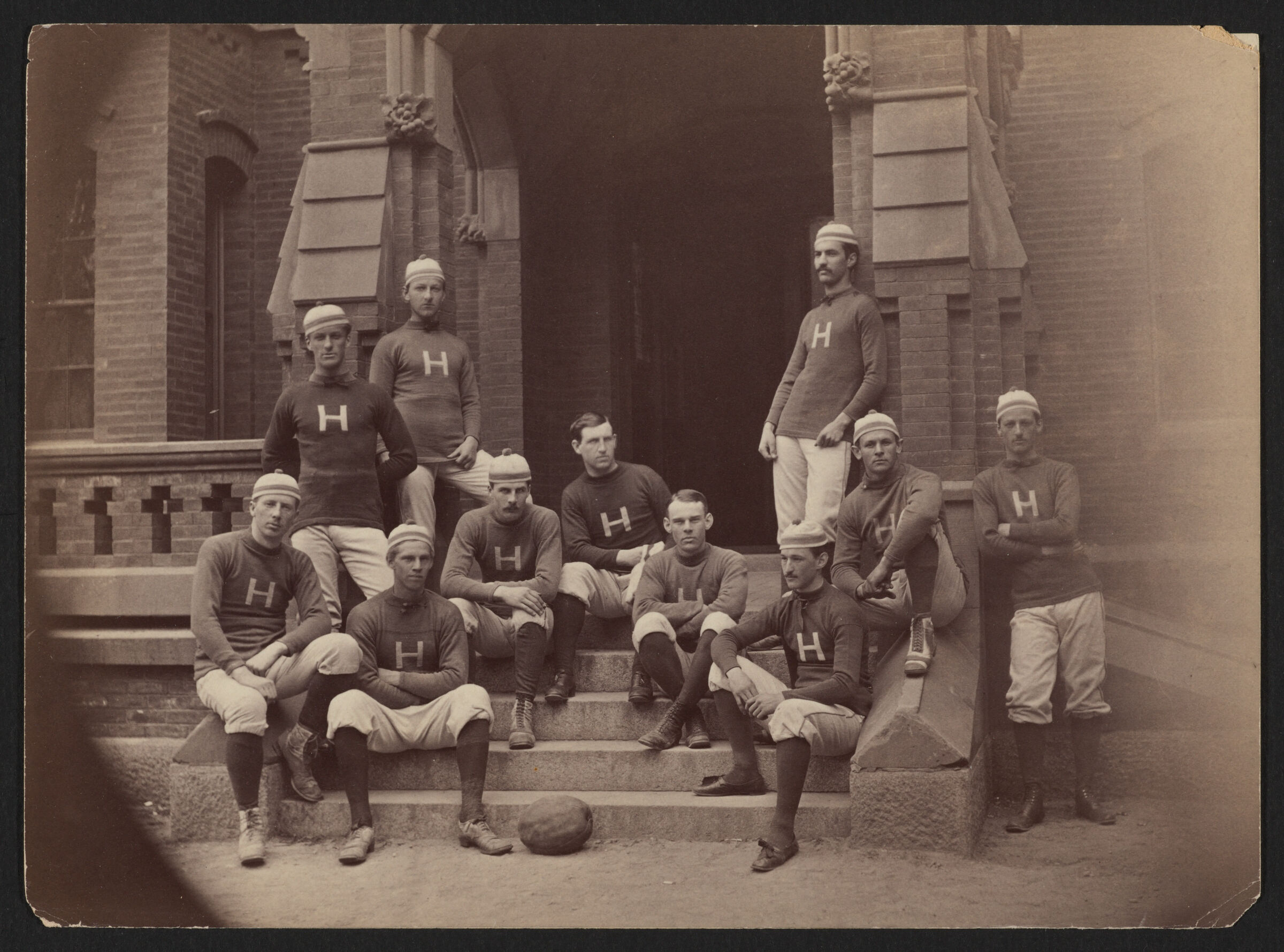
- Conference: Independent
- Record: 1–2
- Head coach: None
- Captain: Livingston Cushing
- Home stadium: Boston Baseball Grounds

1878 college football records
	Conf.			Overall
Team	W	L	T	W		L		T
Princeton		–		6	–	0	–	0
Yale		–		4	–	1	–	1
Columbia		–		0	–	0	–	1
CCNY		–		1	–	1	–	0
Stevens		–		1	–	1	–	2
Harvard		–		1	–	2	–	0
Penn		–		1	–	2	–	1
Rutgers		–		1	–	2	–	1
Amherst		–		1	–	3	–	0
Brown		–		0	–	1	–	0
Swarthmore		–		0	–	1	–	0

The 1878 Harvard Crimson football team represented Harvard University in the 1878 college football season. They finished with a 1–2 record. The team captain, for the second consecutive year, was Livingston Cushing.

On November 9, Harvard opened its football season with a victory over Amherst at Boston's South End Grounds. Harvard scored three goals and three touchdowns, holding Amherst scoreless.

On November 16, Harvard lost to Princeton in a game played before approximately 1,000 spectators at the Boston Baseball Grounds. The New York Herald called it "a magnificent contest."

One week later, on November 23, Harvard lost to Yale before 700 spectators at the Boston Baseball Grounds. Yale won with a kick for goal.

== Schedule ==
Date	Time	Opponent	Site	Result	Attendance	Source
November 9		Amherst	Boston Baseball Grounds; Boston, MA	W 3–0		
November 16	2:30 p.m.	Princeton	Boston Baseball Grounds; Boston, MA (rivalry)	L 0–1	1,000	
November 23		Yale	Boston Baseball Grounds; Boston MA (rivalry)	L 0–1	700	
