= 1878 Yale Bulldogs football team =

American college football season

1878 Yale Bulldogs football
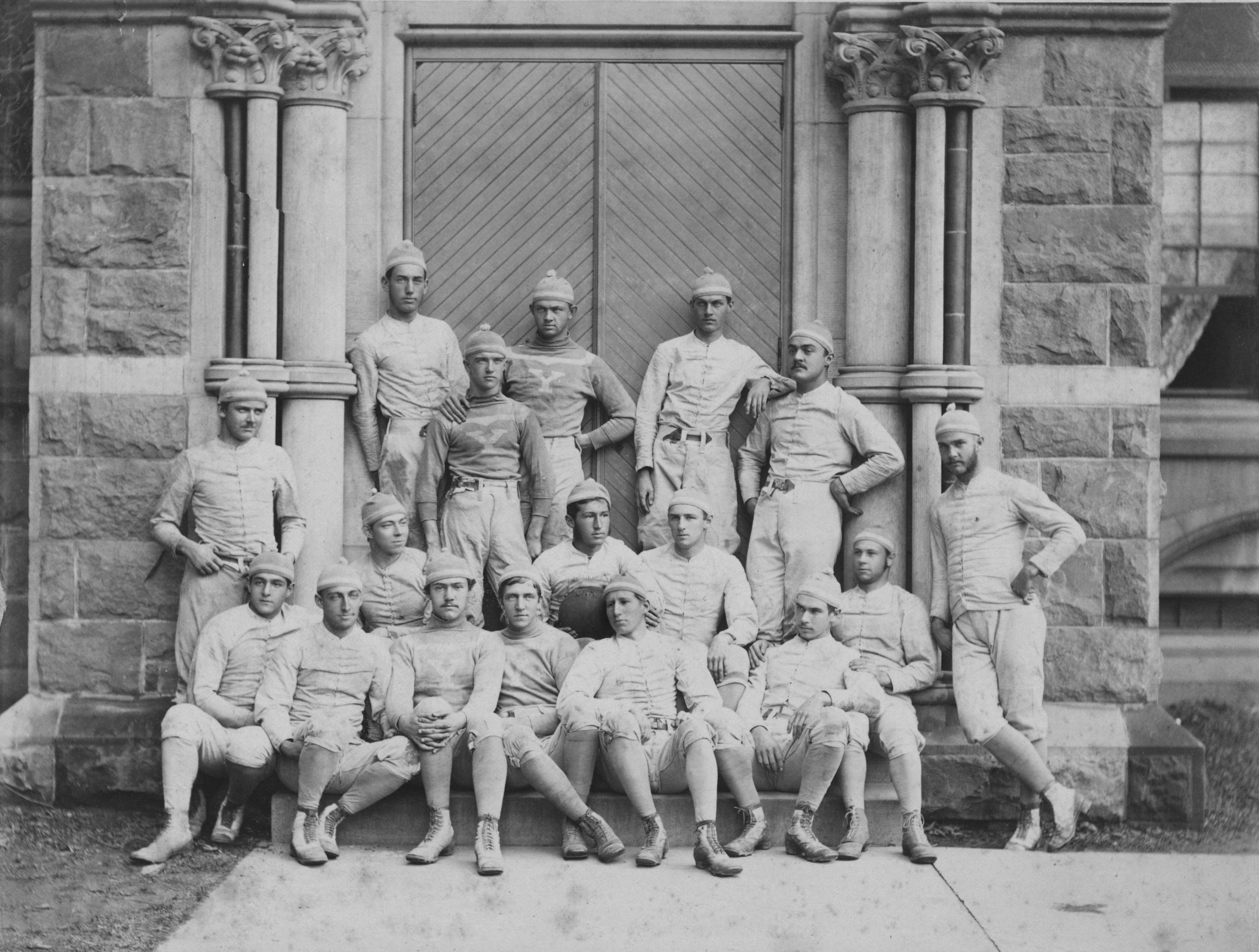
- Conference: Independent
- Record: 4–1–1
- Head coach: None
- Captain: Walter Camp
- Home stadium: Hamilton Park

1878 college football records
	Conf.			Overall
Team	W	L	T	W		L		T
Princeton		–		6	–	0	–	0
Yale		–		4	–	1	–	1
Columbia		–		0	–	0	–	1
CCNY		–		1	–	1	–	0
Stevens		–		1	–	1	–	2
Harvard		–		1	–	2	–	0
Penn		–		1	–	2	–	1
Rutgers		–		1	–	2	–	1
Amherst		–		1	–	3	–	0
Brown		–		0	–	1	–	0
Swarthmore		–		0	–	1	–	0

The 1878 Yale Bulldogs football team represented Yale University in the 1878 college football season. The Bulldogs finished with a 4–1–1 record. The team recorded five shutouts and outscored its opponents by a combined total of 7 to 1.

== Schedule ==
Date	Time	Opponent	Site	Result	Attendance	Source
November 2		Amherst	Hamilton Park; New Haven, CT	W 2–0		
November 9		Trinity (CT)	Hamilton Park; New Haven, CT	W 2–0		
November 13		at Trinity (CT)	Hartford Ball Club Grounds; Hartford, CT	W 3–0		
November 16		at Amherst	Blake Field; Amherst, MA	T 0–0		
November 23		at Harvard	Boston Baseball Grounds; Boston, MA (rivalry)	W 1–0	700	
November 28	2:25 p.m.	vs. Princeton	St. George's Cricket Club grounds; Hoboken, NJ (rivalry)	L 0–1		

== Roster ==
- Walter Irving Badger
- Fayette J. Brown
- Frederic W. Brown
- Walter Camp
- Henry C. Crouch
- Franklin M. Eaton
- John V. Farwell
- Philo C. Fuller
- John S. Harding
- William B. Hill
- Louis K. Hull
- Henry Ives
- Preston King
- Benjamin B. Lamb
- John Moorhead Jr.
- William W. K. Nixon
- William A. Peters
- Thomas E. Rochfort
- O. D. Thompson
- Frederick R. Vernon
- William J. Wakeman
- Robert W. Watson
