= Brown Bears football =

Intercollegiate American football team for Brown University

| 2026 Brown Bears football team |
- First season: 1878; 148 years ago
- Athletic director: Jack Hayes
- Head coach: James Perry; 6th season, 20–40 (.333)
- Location: Providence, Rhode Island
- Stadium: Richard Gouse Field at Brown Stadium (capacity: 20,000)
- NCAA division: Division I FCS
- Conference: Ivy League
- Colors: Seal brown, cardinal red, and white
- All-time record: 633–626–40 (.503)
- Bowl record: 0–1 (.000)

Conference championships
- Ivy League: 1976, 1999, 2005, 2008
- Consensus All-Americans: 10
- Rivalries: Rhode Island (rivalry)

Uniforms
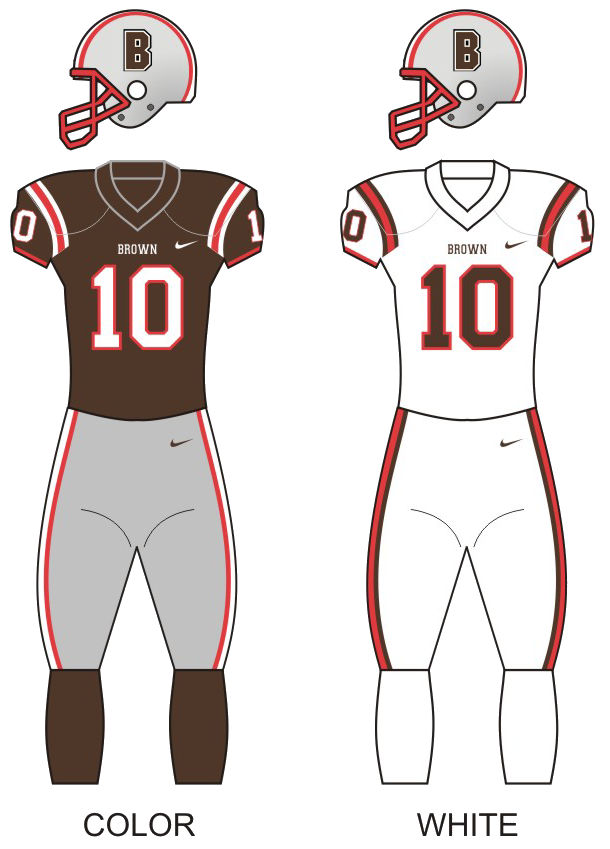
- Fight song: Ever True
- Marching band: Brown University Band
- Website: BrownBears.com

Brown Bears

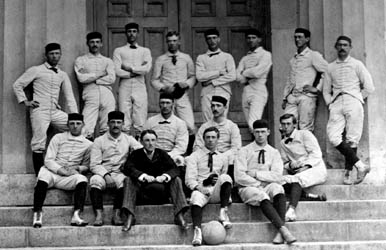
The first team fielded by the Brown University, 1878

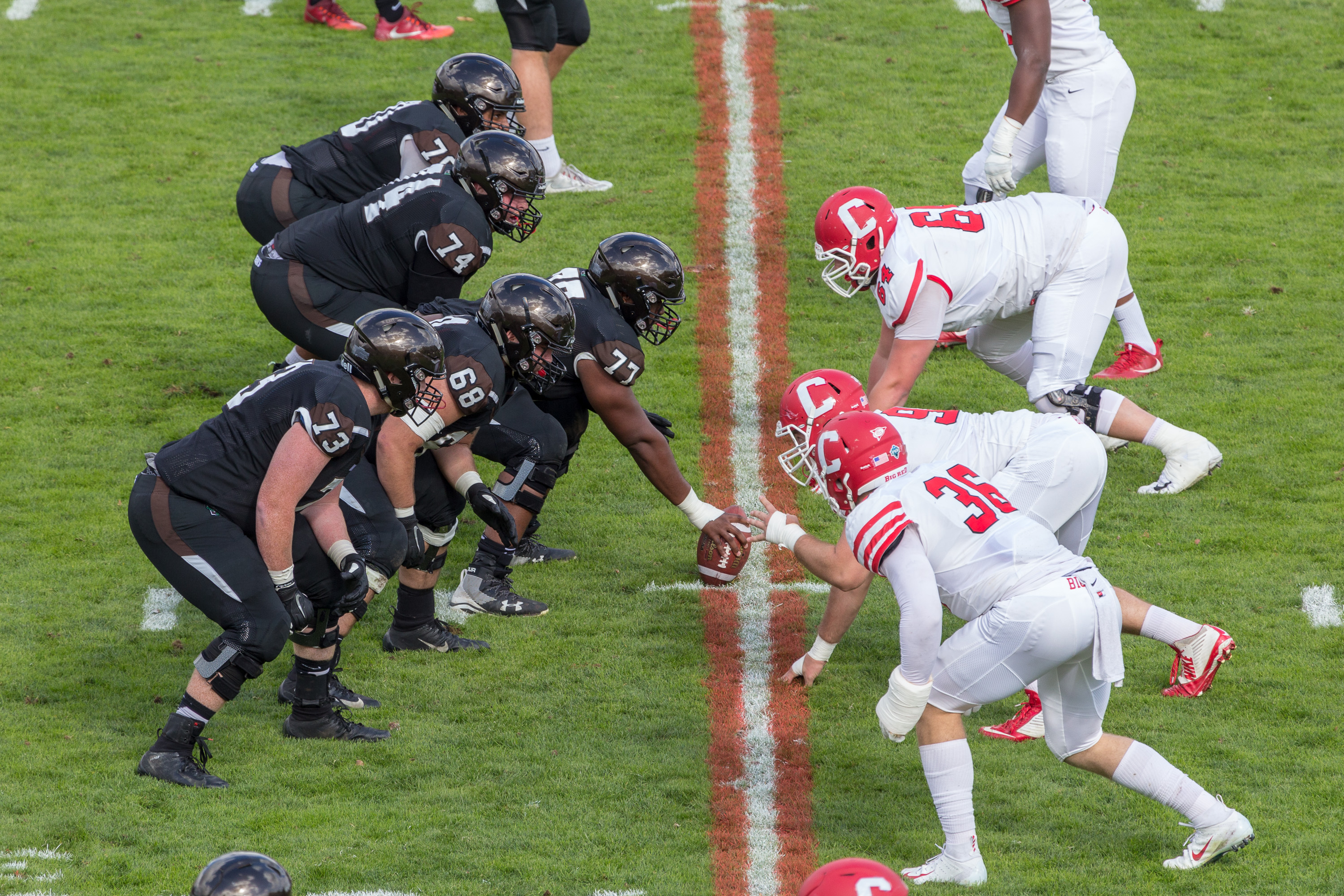
Brown Bears vs. Cornell, 2018

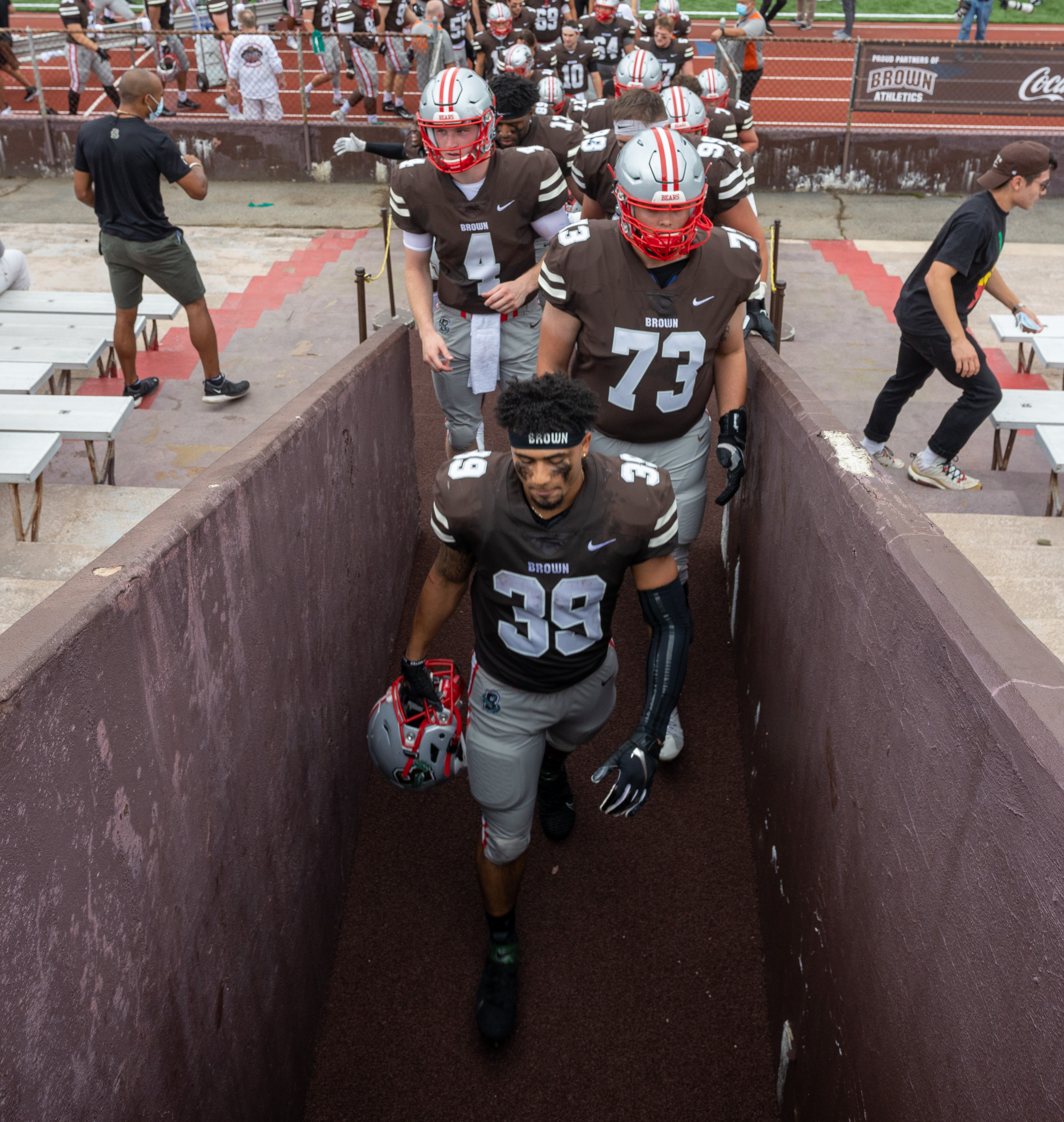
2021 players

The Brown Bears football program is the intercollegiate American football team for Brown University located in the U.S. state of Rhode Island. The team competes in the NCAA Division I Football Championship Subdivision (FCS) and is a member of the Ivy League. Brown's first football team was fielded in 1878. The Bears play their home games at the 20,000-seat Richard Gouse Field at Brown Stadium in Providence, Rhode Island. The team's head coach is James Perry, who was hired on December 3, 2018.

== History ==
Brown University was slow to adopt football as an intercollegiate sport, compared to some other Ivy League schools like Princeton (1869), Yale (1872), Harvard (1873), and Penn State University (1876). Brown president Barnas Sears banned the sport in 1862 "because of its violent nature." It was introduced as an intramural sport in 1866, but Brown didn't play its first intercollegiate football game until November 13, 1878, losing a game against Amherst College. Brown then played a rather sporadic schedule; they played (and lost) one game in 1880 against Yale; in 1886 played two games, losing one to Boston University and winning one against Providence High School. Lack of campus interest in the sport led Brown to skip the 1887 and 1888 seasons entirely. Future football legend John Heisman, frustrated by the lack of playing opportunity at Brown, joined a Pawtucket club team to get more time on the field. He departed for Penn for the 1889 season.

Fritz Pollard, “the human torpedo,” led Brown to the Rose Bowl in 1915 as a freshman. In 1916 Pollard led Brown to an 8-1 record, including Brown's first win against Harvard.

In the middle of the 1926 season, the “Iron Men” came into being when the same 11 players played against Yale University for 60 minutes and a 7–0 win. The next week the same 11 players played without substitution against Dartmouth and won 10–0. Two weeks later the Iron Men played 58 minutes against Harvard, but in the last two minutes the substitutes came in to earn their letters. Brown won all its games that year until the Thanksgiving game against Colgate ended in a 10–10 tie. The famed “Iron Men” were Thurston Towle ’28, Paul Hodge ’28, Orland Smith ’27, Charles Considine ’28, Lou Farber ’29, Ed Kevorkian ’29, Hal Broda ’27, Al Cornsweet ’29, Dave Mishel ’27, Ed Lawrence ’28, and Roy Randall ’28. In the 1948 season, Brown fans were the originators of the popular "de-fense!" chant that spread to the NFL in the 1950s. Following the 1981 season, the Ivy League was reclassified to Division I-AA, today known as the Football Championship Subdivision (FCS), Brown moved to Division I-AA play with the rest of the league. Brown has 607 wins, making them tied for 72nd all time in wins among division one football programs.

In 1997, Phil Estes began a twenty-one year tenure as Brown's head coach, resulting in three Ivy League championships. In 2018, after two consecutive winless seasons in the Ivy League, Estes announced that he would be stepping down. James Perry was named head coach in December 2018.

Brown did not compete during the 2020 season as a result of the COVID-19 pandemic and the subsequent cancellation of the Ivy League season.

== Championships ==
The Bears have no national championships, though they do have one undefeated team, the 1926 team, also known as the Iron Men of 1926, finishing 9–0–1 (and winning all three of their Ivy League games), with a 10–10 tie with Colgate in the last game of the season.

=== Conference championships ===
The Bears have won the Ivy League title four times in their history. The Bears won their first Ivy League title in 1976, sharing it with Yale while finishing 8–1 on the season, clinching the title with a 28–17 victory over Columbia. In 1999, the Bears went 9–1 (the most victories since 1926, along with a record seven game winning streak), while beating Columbia 23–6 to share the Ivy League title with Yale. In 2005, the Bears finished 9–1, beating Columbia 52–21 in their final game in order to clinch their first ever outright Ivy League title and third overall. In 2008, the Bears finished 7–3 (while losing only one Ivy League game), beating Columbia 41–10 to clinch a share of the Ivy League title, their fourth over conference title and third in nine years.

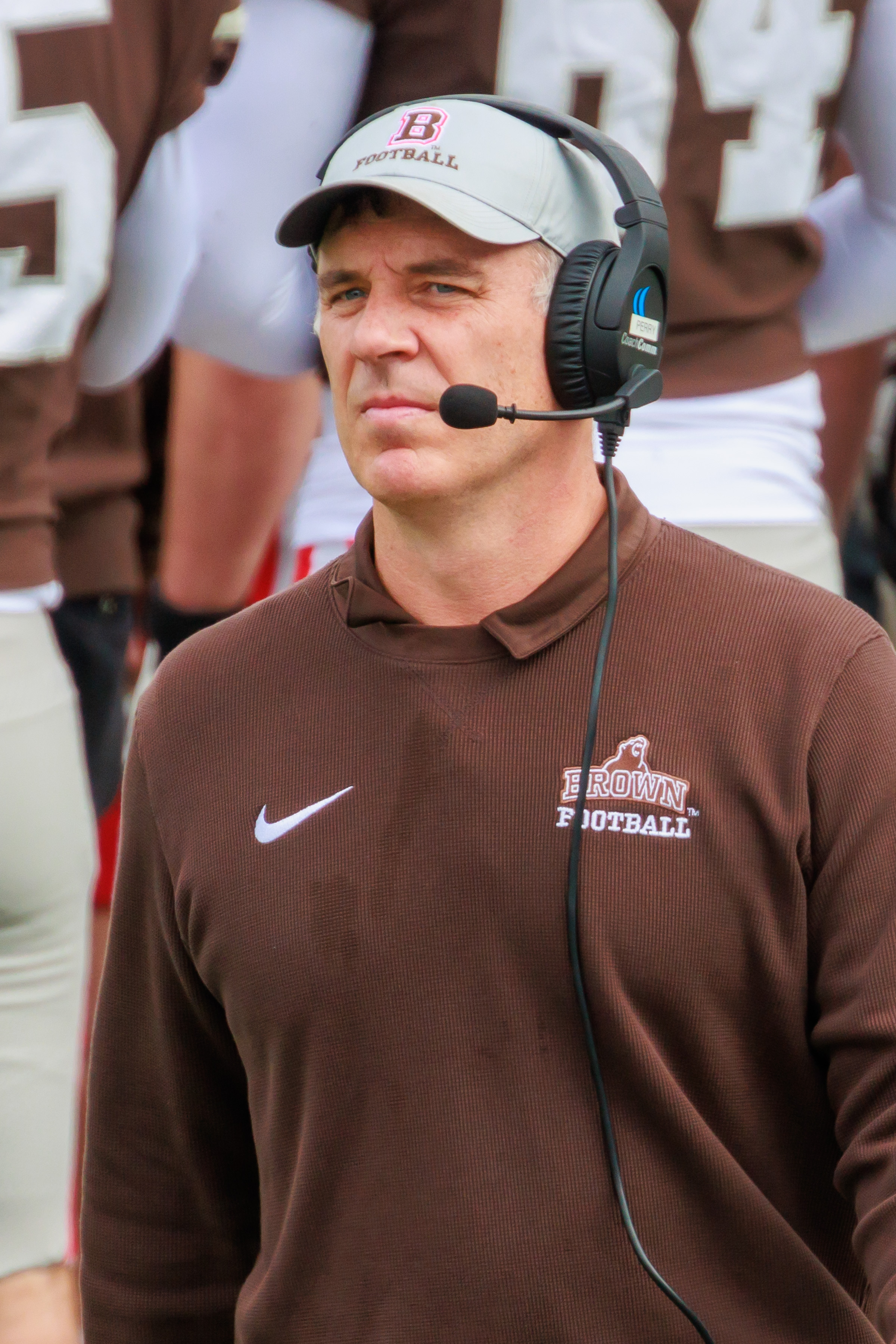
Coach James Perry

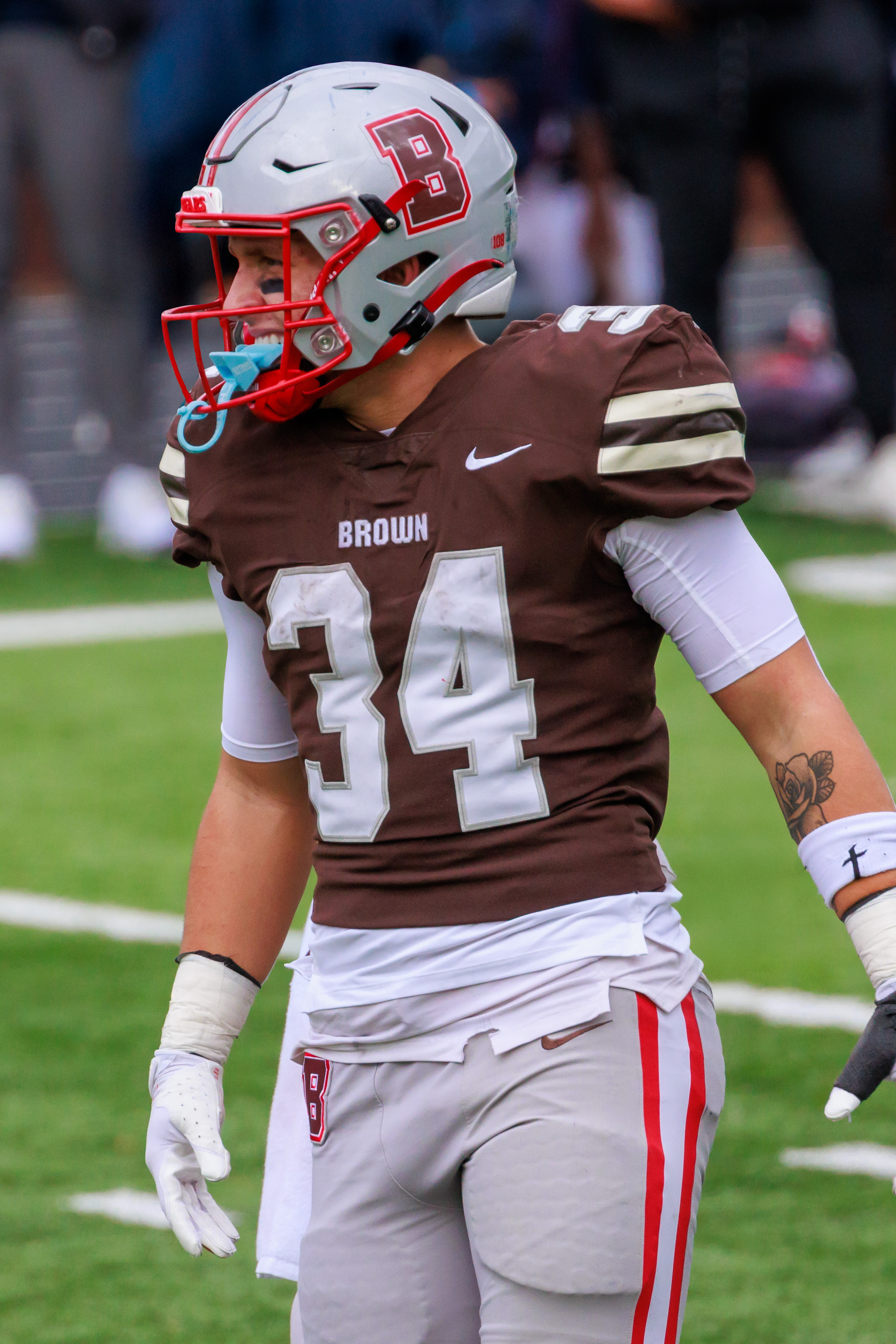
Matt Childs, 2024 Ivy League Rookie of the Year

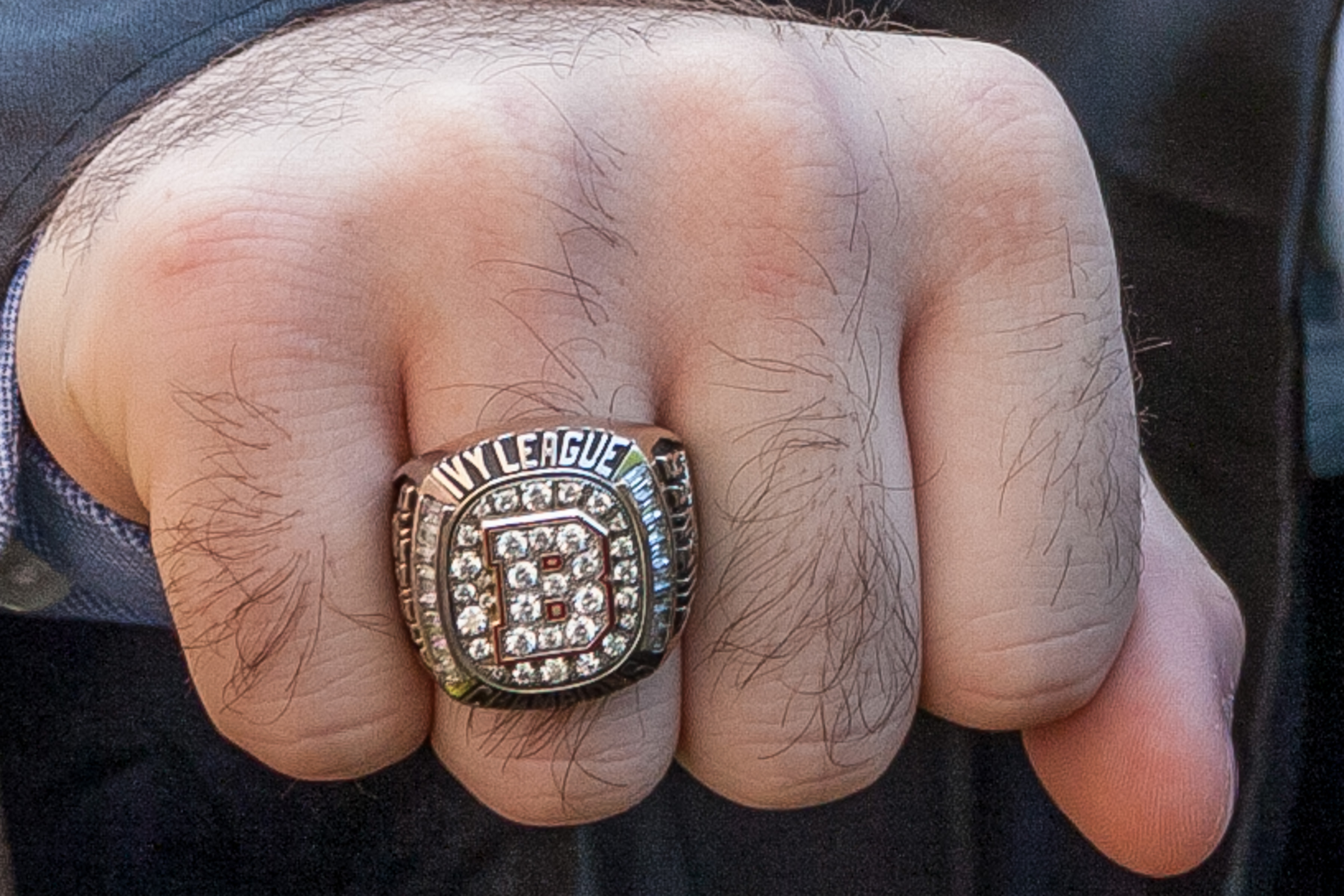
Brown's 2005 Ivy Championship ring

| Year | Conference | Coach | Overall record | Conference record |
|---|---|---|---|---|
| 1976† | Ivy League | John W. Anderson | 8–1 | 6–1 |
| 1999† | Ivy League | Phil Estes | 9–1 | 6–1 |
| 2005 | Ivy League | Phil Estes | 9–1 | 6–1 |
| 2008† | Ivy League | Phil Estes | 7–3 | 6–1 |

== Bowl games ==
Brown has made one bowl appearance, garnering a record of 0–1.

| Season | Date | Bowl | Coach | Opponent | Result |
|---|---|---|---|---|---|
| 1915 | January 1, 1916 | Rose Bowl | Eddie N. Robinson | Washington State | L 0–14 |

== Rivalries ==
=== Rhode Island ===
Brown leads the series with Rhode Island, their in-state rival, 73–27–2.

== College Football Hall of Famers ==
- John Heisman (1887–1889, elected in 1954)
- Tuss McLaughry (1926–1940, elected in 1962)
- Fritz Pollard (1915–1916, elected in 1954)
- Eddie N. Robinson (played 1892–1895; coached 1904–1907, 1910–1925, elected in 1955)
- Earl Sprackling (1908-1911, elected 1964)
- Wallace Wade (1914–1916, elected in 1955)

== Notable former players ==
- Zak DeOssie
- James Develin
- John Heisman
- Steve Jordan
- Bob Margarita
- Sean Morey
- Bill O'Brien
- Joe Paterno
- E. J. Perry
- Fritz Pollard
- Kyle Rowley

== Future non-conference opponents ==
Announced schedules as of September 9, 2025.

| 2026 | 2027 | 2028 | 2029 | 2030 | 2031 |
|---|---|---|---|---|---|
| at New Haven | New Haven | at Sacred Heart | Rhode Island | at Rhode Island | Rhode Island |
| at Rhode Island | at Bryant | at Rhode Island | | | |
| Bryant | Rhode Island | Merrimack | | | |
