= 1878 Columbia football team =

American college football season

1878 Columbia football
- Conference: Independent
- Record: 0–0–1
- Head coach: None
- Captain: Augustus I. Burton

1878 college football records
	Conf.			Overall
Team	W	L	T	W		L		T
Princeton		–		6	–	0	–	0
Yale		–		4	–	1	–	1
Columbia		–		0	–	0	–	1
CCNY		–		1	–	1	–	0
Stevens		–		1	–	1	–	2
Harvard		–		1	–	2	–	0
Penn		–		1	–	2	–	1
Rutgers		–		1	–	2	–	1
Amherst		–		1	–	3	–	0
Brown		–		0	–	1	–	0
Swarthmore		–		0	–	1	–	0

The 1878 Columbia football team represented Columbia University in the 1878 college football season. The team had no head coach, and compiled a record of 0–0–1.Augustus I. Burton served as team captain.

== Schedule ==
Date	Opponent	Site	Result	Source
November 16	vs. Penn	St. George's Cricket Club grounds; Hoboken, NJ	T 0–0	
