= Stevens Institute football, 1872–1879 =

Early American football team of Stevens Institute of Technology (Hoboken, NJ, USA)

The Stevens Institute football program, 1872–1879 represented Stevens Institute of Technology of Hoboken, New Jersey in American football during the school's first decade of college football. Highlights of these early years include:

- On November 23, 1872, Stevens played its first intercollegiate football game, losing to Columbia by a 6–0 score.
- On October 18, 1873, Stevens won its first intercollegiate game, defeating by a 6–1 score. The 1873 team went on to win three of four games with additional victories over the City College of New York and the New Jersey Athletic Club.
- The 1874 team also compiled a 3–1 record with victories over Columbia, Rutgers, and NYU. The team's only loss was to national champion Yale.
- The 1879 team was the first Stevens team to play more than four games. It played eight games and compiled a 1–2–5 record, including four scoreless ties.

== 1872 ==
1872 Stevens football
- Conference: Independent
- Record: 0–1
- Head coach: None

1872 college football records
	Conf.			Overall
Team	W	L	T	W		L		T
Princeton		–		1	–	0	–	0
Yale		–		1	–	0	–	0
Rutgers		–		1	–	1	–	1
Columbia		–		1	–	2	–	1
Stevens		–		0	–	1	–	0

The 1872 Stevens football team represented Stevens Institute of Technology in the 1872 college football season.

=== Schedule ===
Date	Opponent	Site	Result
November 23	at Columbia	New York, NY	L 0–6

== 1873 ==
1873 Stevens football
- Conference: Independent
- Record: 3–1
- Head coach: None
- Home stadium: Elysian Fields

1873 college football records
	Conf.			Overall
Team	W		L		W		L
Princeton		–		1	–	0	–	0
Harvard		–		1	–	0	–	1
Washington and Lee		–		4	–	0	–	0
Stevens		–		3	–	1	–	0
Yale		–		2	–	1	–	0
Columbia		–		2	–	1	–	0
Rutgers		–		1	–	2	–	0
McGill		–		0	–	1	–	1
Eton		–		0	–	1	–	0
CCNY		–		0	–	1	–	0
New Jersey AC		–		0	–	1	–	0
NYU		–		0	–	1	–	0
Princeton Seminary		–		0	–	1	–	0
VMI		–		0	–	1	–	0

The 1873 Stevens football team represented Stevens Institute of Technology in the 1873 college football season.

=== Schedule ===
Date	Opponent	Site	Result	Source
October 18	NYU		W 6–1	
October 25	Columbia		L 1–2	
November 15	CCNY	Elysian Fields; Hoboken, NJ	W 3–0	
November 26	New Jersey A.C.		W 2–0	

== 1874 ==
1874 Stevens football
- Conference: Independent
- Record: 2–2
- Head coach: None

1874 college football records
	Conf.			Overall
Team	W		L		W		L
Yale		–		3	–	0	–	0
Princeton		–		2	–	0	–	0
Harvard		–		1	–	1	–	0
Tufts		–		1	–	0	–	0
Stevens		–		2	–	2	–	0
Rutgers		–		2	–	2	–	0
Columbia		–		1	–	5	–	0
NYU		–		0	–	1	–	0
McGill		–		0	–	1	–	0

The 1874 Stevens football team represented Stevens Institute of Technology in the 1874 college football season.

=== Schedule ===
Date	Opponent	Site	Result
October 31	Columbia	Hoboken, NJ	W 4–2
November 1	at Rutgers	New Brunswick, NJ	L 0–6
November 10	NYU	Hoboken, NJ	W 6–0
November 18	at Yale	New Haven, CT	L 0–6

== 1875 ==
1875 Stevens football
- Conference: Independent
- Record: 3–3
- Head coach: None

1875 college football records
	Conf.			Overall
Team	W	L	T	W		L		T
Harvard		–		4	–	0	–	0
Princeton		–		2	–	0	–	0
Columbia		–		4	–	1	–	1
Rutgers		–		1	–	1	–	1
Yale		–		2	–	2	–	0
Stevens		–		3	–	3	–	0
Tufts		–		0	–	1	–	0
NYU		–		0	–	1	–	0
Wesleyan		–		0	–	1	–	0
Bates		–		0	–	1	–	0
Canada All-Stars		–		0	–	2	–	0
CCNY		–		0	–	3	–	0

The 1875 Stevens football team represented Stevens Institute of Technology in the 1875 college football season.

=== Schedule ===
Date	Opponent	Site	Result
October 17	NYU	Hoboken, NJ	W 5–0
October 24	at Rutgers	New Brunswick, NJ	L 0–6
October 31	CCNY	Hoboken, NJ	W 6–0
November 4	Columbia	Hoboken, NJ	L 1–2
November 11	CCNY	Hoboken, NJ	W 6–0
November 20	at Princeton	Princeton, NJ	L 0–6

== 1876 ==
1876 Stevens football
- Conference: Independent
- Record: 2–2
- Head coach: None
- Home stadium: grounds at foot of Ninth Street, St. George's Cricket Club

1876 college football records
	Conf.			Overall
Team	W	L	T	W		L		T
Yale		–		3	–	0	–	0
Rutgers		–		1	–	0	–	0
Harvard		–		3	–	1	–	0
Princeton		–		3	–	2	–	0
Stevens		–		2	–	2	–	0
CCNY		–		1	–	1	–	0
Penn		–		1	–	2	–	0
Columbia		–		1	–	3	–	0
Canada All-Stars		–		0	–	1	–	0
McGill		–		0	–	1	–	0
Northwestern		–		0	–	1	–	0
Philadelphia All-Stars		–		0	–	1	–	0
NYU		–		0	–	2	–	0

The 1876 Stevens football team was an American football team that represented Stevens Institute of Technology in the 1876 college football season. The team compiled a 2–2 record in games against Rutgers, Columbia, and NYU.

=== Schedule ===
Date	Opponent	Site	Result	Attendance	Source
October 31	NYU	grounds at foot of Ninth Street; Hoboken, NJ	W 8–0		
November 1	at Rutgers		L 2–3		
November 11	Columbia	grounds at foot of Ninth Street; Hoboken, NJ	W 5–3		
November 29	Columbia	St. George's Cricket Club; Hoboken, NJ	L 0–4	200–300	

== 1877 ==
1877 Stevens football
- Conference: Independent
- Record: 1–3
- Head coach: None

1877 college football records
	Conf.			Overall
Team	W	L	T	W		L		T
Yale		–		3	–	0	–	1
Princeton		–		2	–	0	–	1
Amherst		–		1	–	0	–	0
Harvard		–		3	–	1	–	0
Columbia		–		2	–	2	–	0
Rutgers		–		1	–	2	–	0
Stevens		–		1	–	3	–	0
Tufts		–		0	–	3	–	0

The 1877 Stevens football team was an American football team that represented Stevens Institute of Technology in the 1877 college football season. The team compiled a 1–3 record.

=== Schedule ===
Date	Opponent	Site	Result	Source
October 27	Rutgers	St. George's Cricket Club grounds; Hoboken, NJ	W 4–1	
November 13	Columbia	St. George's Cricket Club grounds; Hoboken, NJ	L 0–1	
November 14	at Rutgers	New Brunswick, NJ	L 0–5	
November 24	at Yale	New Haven, CT	L 0–13	

== 1878 ==
1878 Stevens football
- Conference: Independent
- Record: 1–1–2
- Head coach: None
- Home stadium: St. George's Cricket Club grounds

1878 college football records
	Conf.			Overall
Team	W	L	T	W		L		T
Princeton		–		6	–	0	–	0
Yale		–		4	–	1	–	1
Columbia		–		0	–	0	–	1
CCNY		–		1	–	1	–	0
Stevens		–		1	–	1	–	2
Harvard		–		1	–	2	–	0
Penn		–		1	–	2	–	1
Rutgers		–		1	–	2	–	1
Amherst		–		1	–	3	–	0
Brown		–		0	–	1	–	0
Swarthmore		–		0	–	1	–	0

The 1878 Stevens football team was an American football team that represented Stevens Institute of Technology in the 1878 college football season. The team compiled a 1–1–2 record and was outscored by a total of four goals to one. The team played home games at the St. George's Cricket Club grounds in Hoboken, New Jersey.

=== Schedule ===
Date	Time	Opponent	Site	Result	Source
October 26	2:34 p.m.	at Princeton	University grounds; Princeton, NJ	L 0–4	
October 29		at Rutgers	New Brunswick, NJ	T 0–0	
November 5		Columbia	St. George's Cricket Club grounds; Hoboken, NJ	T 0–0	
November 9		Rutgers	St. George's Cricket Club grounds; Hoboken, NJ	W 1–0	

=== Game summaries ===
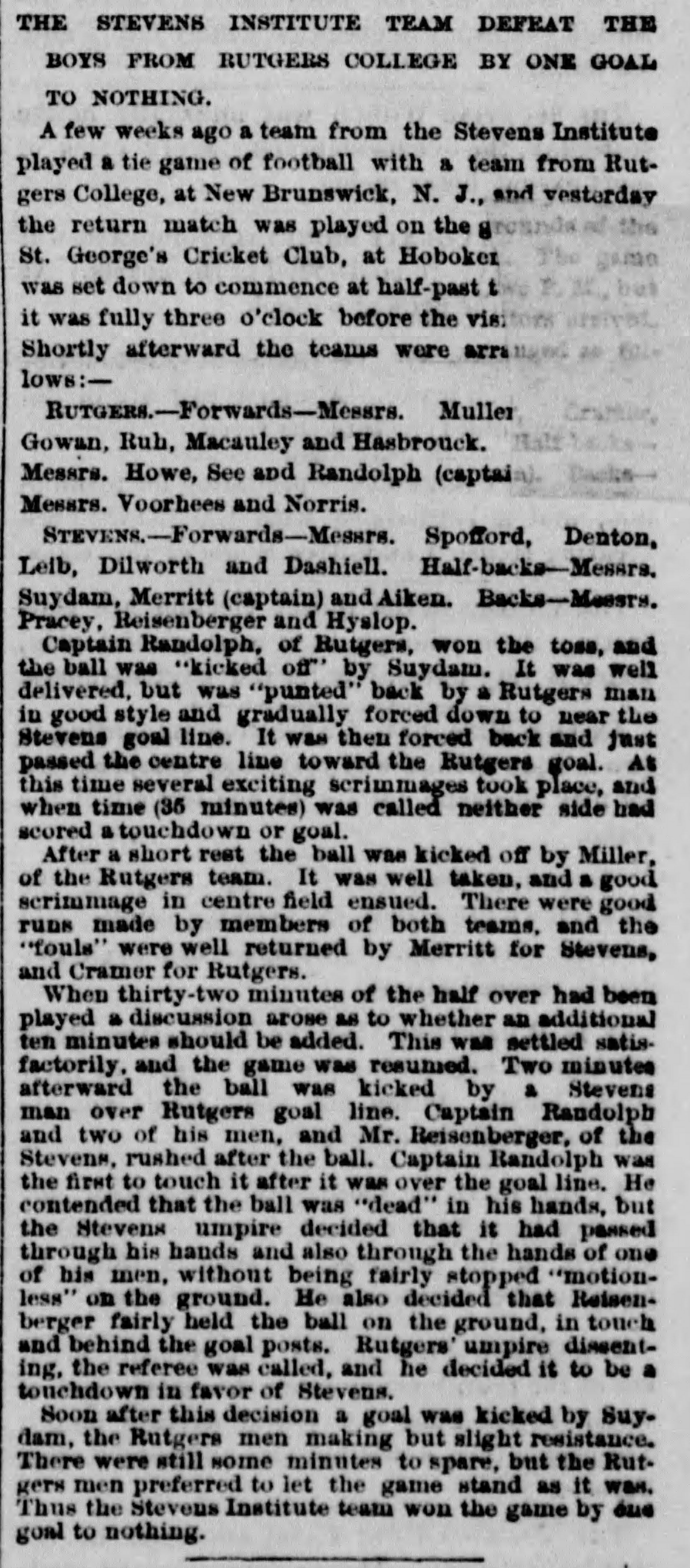
Newspaper account of Stevens' victory over Rutgers

==== Princeton ====
On October 26, at 2:30 p.m., the Princeton football team played a football match against Stevens Institute of Technology and (with some participation from members of the St. George's Cricket Club). The game was played between teams of 15 players per side on the Princeton University grounds before a large crowd, including many carriages parked in the space outside the ropes. Princeton scored four goals and six touchdowns. Stevens did not score.

The lineup for Stevens Institute was as follows: Spofford, Rosenbury, Dilworth, Clarke, Leib, Rosenberger, Denton, Dashill and Suydam as forwards; Merritt, Connover, and Herrick as halfbacks; and Hysop, Pracay, and Moore as backs. Merritt was the Stevens team captain.

==== Rutgers ====
On October 30, the team from Stevens Institute played a match against the Rutgers College team in New Brunswick, New Jersey. The game ended in a scoreless tie with neither side scoring a goal or touchdown.

==== Columbia ====
On November 5, Stevens was scheduled to play a match against the team from the College of the City of New York (CCNY) at St. George's Cricket Club grounds in Hoboken, New Jersey. The CCNY club did not show up, but a group of nine students from Columbia arrived and agreed to a "scratch game". Sides were chosen among the available players by Herrick of Stevens and Burton of Columbia. Burton's team scored three touchdowns, but neither team scored a goal.

==== Rutgers ====
On November 9, at 3:00 p.m., Stevens hosted Rutgers for a return match on the St. George's Cricket Club grounds. Neither team scored a touchdown or goal in the first or second halves. The sides agreed to an additional 10 minutes. Reisenberger recovered the ball beyond Rutgers' goal line for a touchdown, and Suydam kicked the goal giving Stevens the victory by one goal to none.

The lineup for Stevens included Muller, Gowen, Ruh, Macauley, and Hasbrouck at the forward positions, Howe, See and Randolph at the halfback positions, and Voorhees and Norris as backs. Randolph was the team captain.

== 1879 ==
1879 Stevens football
- Conference: Independent
- Record: 1–2–5
- Head coach: None
- Home stadium: St. George's Cricket Club grounds

1879 college football records
	Conf.			Overall
Team	W	L	T	W		L		T
Princeton		–		4	–	0	–	1
Yale		–		3	–	0	–	2
Massachusetts		–		1	–	0	–	0
Michigan		–		1	–	0	–	1
Haverford		–		1	–	0	–	1
Harvard		–		2	–	1	–	2
Penn		–		2	–	2	–	0
Amherst		–		1	–	1	–	0
Navy		–		0	–	0	–	1
McGill		–		0	–	0	–	1
Toronto		–		0	–	0	–	1
Stevens		–		1	–	2	–	5
Rutgers		–		1	–	2	–	3
Pennsylvania Military		–		0	–	1	–	1
NYU		–		0	–	2	–	1
Racine		–		0	–	1	–	0
Swarthmore		–		0	–	1	–	0
Columbia		–		0	–	3	–	2

The 1879 Stevens Ducks football team was an American football team that represented Stevens Institute of Technology in the 1879 college football season. The team compiled a 1–2–5 record and was outscored by a total of 12 to 6. The team played home games at the St. George's Cricket Club grounds in Hoboken, New Jersey.

=== Schedule ===
Date	Opponent	Site	Result	Source
October 9	Stevens alumni	St. George's Cricket Club grounds; Hoboken, NJ	T 0–0	
October 25	Columbia	St. George's Cricket Club grounds; Hoboken, NJ	T 0–0	
November 8	at Princeton	Princeton Athletic Grounds; Princeton, NJ	L 0–7	
November 11	Rutgers	St. George's Cricket Club grounds; Hoboken, NJ	L 0–1	
November 23	at Rutgers	New Brunswick, NJ	T 3–3	
November 25	at Rutgers	New Brunswick, NJ	W 3–1	
December 6	Stevens alumni	St. George's Cricket Club grounds; Hoboken, NJ	T 0–0	
December 13	Rutgers	St. George's Cricket Club grounds; Hoboken, NJ	T 0–0	
