= 1878 CCNY Lavender football team =

American college football season

1878 CCNY Lavender football
- Conference: Independent
- Record: 1–1
- Head coach: None

1878 college football records
	Conf.			Overall
Team	W	L	T	W		L		T
Princeton		–		6	–	0	–	0
Yale		–		4	–	1	–	1
Columbia		–		0	–	0	–	1
CCNY		–		1	–	1	–	0
Stevens		–		1	–	1	–	2
Harvard		–		1	–	2	–	0
Penn		–		1	–	2	–	1
Rutgers		–		1	–	2	–	1
Amherst		–		1	–	3	–	0
Brown		–		0	–	1	–	0
Swarthmore		–		0	–	1	–	0

The 1878 CCNY Lavender football team represented the City College of New York during the 1878 college football season.

== Schedule ==
Date	Opponent	Site	Result	Source
November 5	Seawanhakas Club	Capitoline Grounds; Brooklyn, NY	W 7–0	
December 7	at Rutgers	New Brunswick, NJ	L 0–6	
