= 1878 Princeton Tigers football team =

American college football season

1878 Princeton Tigers football

National champion
- Conference: Independent
- Record: 6–0
- Head coach: None
- Captain: Bland Ballard

1878 college football records
	Conf.			Overall
Team	W	L	T	W		L		T
Princeton		–		6	–	0	–	0
Yale		–		4	–	1	–	1
Columbia		–		0	–	0	–	1
CCNY		–		1	–	1	–	0
Stevens		–		1	–	1	–	2
Harvard		–		1	–	2	–	0
Penn		–		1	–	2	–	1
Rutgers		–		1	–	2	–	1
Amherst		–		1	–	3	–	0
Brown		–		0	–	1	–	0
Swarthmore		–		0	–	1	–	0

The 1878 Princeton Tigers football team represented the College of New Jersey, then more commonly known as Princeton College, in the 1878 college football season. The team finished with a 6–0 record and allowed only one goal. The Tigers were retroactively named national champions by the Billingsley Report, National Championship Foundation, and Parke H. Davis. This season marked Princeton's eighth national championship, and one of 11 in a 13-year period between 1869 and 1881. The team's captain was Bland Ballard.

Sophomore Woodrow Wilson was elected as Princeton's football director in 1877. Football historian Parke H. Davis credited Wilson with coaching the 1878 team.

== Schedule ==
Date	Time	Opponent	Site	Result	Attendance	Source
October 19		Penn	University grounds; Princeton, NJ (rivalry)	W 2–0		
October 26	2:34 p.m.	Stevens	University grounds; Princeton, NJ	W 4–0		
November 2		Rutgers	Princeton, NJ (rivalry)	W 5–0		
November 9	2:30 p.m.	at Penn	Germantown Cricket Club grounds; Philadelphia, PA	W 2–1		
November 16	2:30 p.m.	at Harvard	Boston Baseball Grounds; Boston, MA (rivalry)	W 1–0	1,000	
November 28	2:25 p.m.	vs. Yale	St. George's Cricket Club grounds; Hoboken, NJ (rivalry)	W 1–0		
