= 1876 Penn Quakers football team =

American college football season

1876 Penn Quakers football
- Conference: Independent
- Record: 1–2
- Head coach: None
- Captain: Charles Farnum

1876 college football records
	Conf.			Overall
Team	W	L	T	W		L		T
Yale		–		3	–	0	–	0
Rutgers		–		1	–	0	–	0
Harvard		–		3	–	1	–	0
Princeton		–		3	–	2	–	0
Stevens		–		2	–	2	–	0
CCNY		–		1	–	1	–	0
Penn		–		1	–	2	–	0
Columbia		–		1	–	3	–	0
Canada All-Stars		–		0	–	1	–	0
McGill		–		0	–	1	–	0
Northwestern		–		0	–	1	–	0
Philadelphia All-Stars		–		0	–	1	–	0
NYU		–		0	–	2	–	0

The 1876 Penn Quakers football team represented the University of Pennsylvania in the 1876 college football season. The team finished with a 1–2 record. This was the first season for the Penn Quakers football team.

== Schedule ==
Date	Opponent	Site	Result	Source
November 11	Princeton	Philadelphia, PA (rivalry)	L 0–6	
November 17	Philadelphia All-Stars	Philadelphia, PA	W 4–0	
November 25	at Princeton	Princeton, NJ	L 0–6	

== See also ==
- List of the first college football game in each US state
