= 1886 Brown Bears football team =

American college football season

1886 Brown Bears football
- Conference: Independent
- Record: 1–1
- Head coach: None

The 1886 Brown Bears football team represented Brown University in the 1886 college football season.

== Schedule ==
Date	Opponent	Site	Result
October 2	at Providence HS	Providence, RI	W 70–0
October 9	Boston University		L 6–10
