= 1877 Harvard Crimson football team =

American college football season

1877 Harvard Crimson football
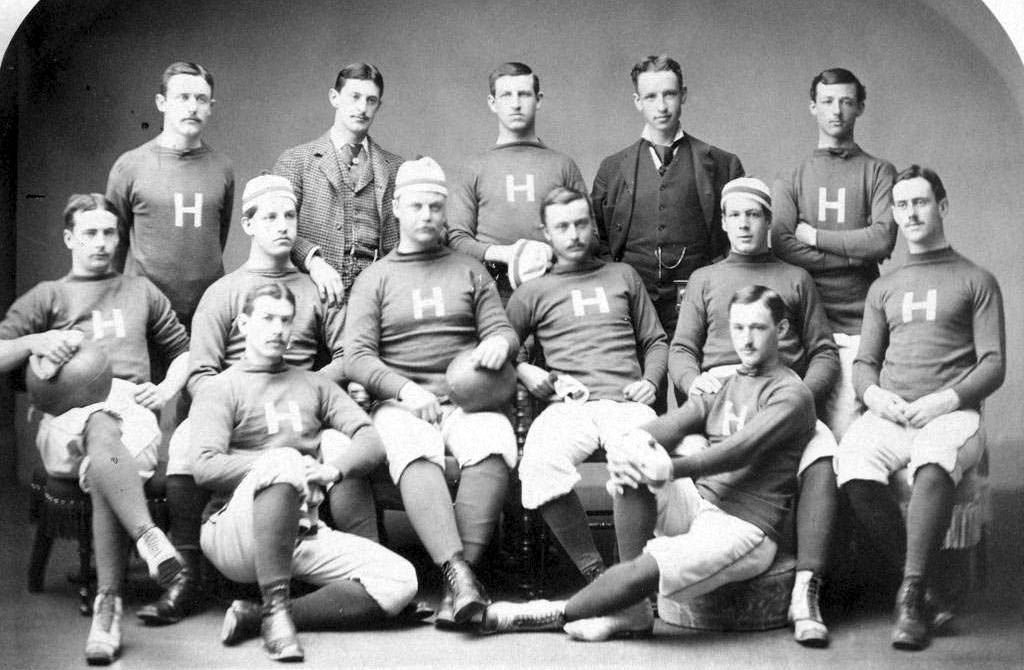
- Conference: Independent
- Record: 3–1
- Head coach: None
- Captain: Livingston Cushing
- Home stadium: Boston Baseball Grounds

1877 college football records
	Conf.			Overall
Team	W	L	T	W		L		T
Yale		–		3	–	0	–	1
Princeton		–		2	–	0	–	1
Amherst		–		1	–	0	–	0
Harvard		–		3	–	1	–	0
Columbia		–		2	–	2	–	0
Rutgers		–		1	–	2	–	0
Stevens		–		1	–	3	–	0
Tufts		–		0	–	3	–	0

The 1877 Harvard Crimson football team represented Harvard University in the 1877 college football season. They finished with a 3–1 record. The team captain was Livingston Cushing.

On November 3, 1877, Harvard suffered its only loss to Princeton in a game played at St George's Cricket Club in Hoboken, New Jersey. The game was played under the "Amended Rugby" rules under which three touchdowns counted as a goal. Princeton scored one goal and one touchdown, and Harvard was held to one touchdown. The game was attended by 400 to 500 students in addition to "several hundred spectators, many of the number being of the fair sex, who came to the scene of battle in carriages."

Two days later, on Monday, November 5, Harvard defeated Columbia in a two-inning match played on the same St. George's Cricket Club grounds. Harvard won the game with six goals and four touchdowns. Columbia did not score.

== Schedule ==
Date	Time	Opponent	Site	Result	Attendance	Source
October 23	3:25 p.m.	Tufts	Boston Baseball Grounds; Boston, MA	W 3–0	500	
October 26	3:00 p.m.	McGill	Boston, MA	W 1–0	1,000	
November 3	2:30 p.m.	vs. Princeton	St. George's Cricket Club grounds; Hoboken, NJ (rivalry)	L 0–1	1,000	
November 5	3:00 p.m.	vs. Columbia	St. George's Cricket Club grounds; Hoboken, NJ	W 6–0	400–500	
