= 1876 Yale Bulldogs football team =

American college football season

1876 Yale Bulldogs football
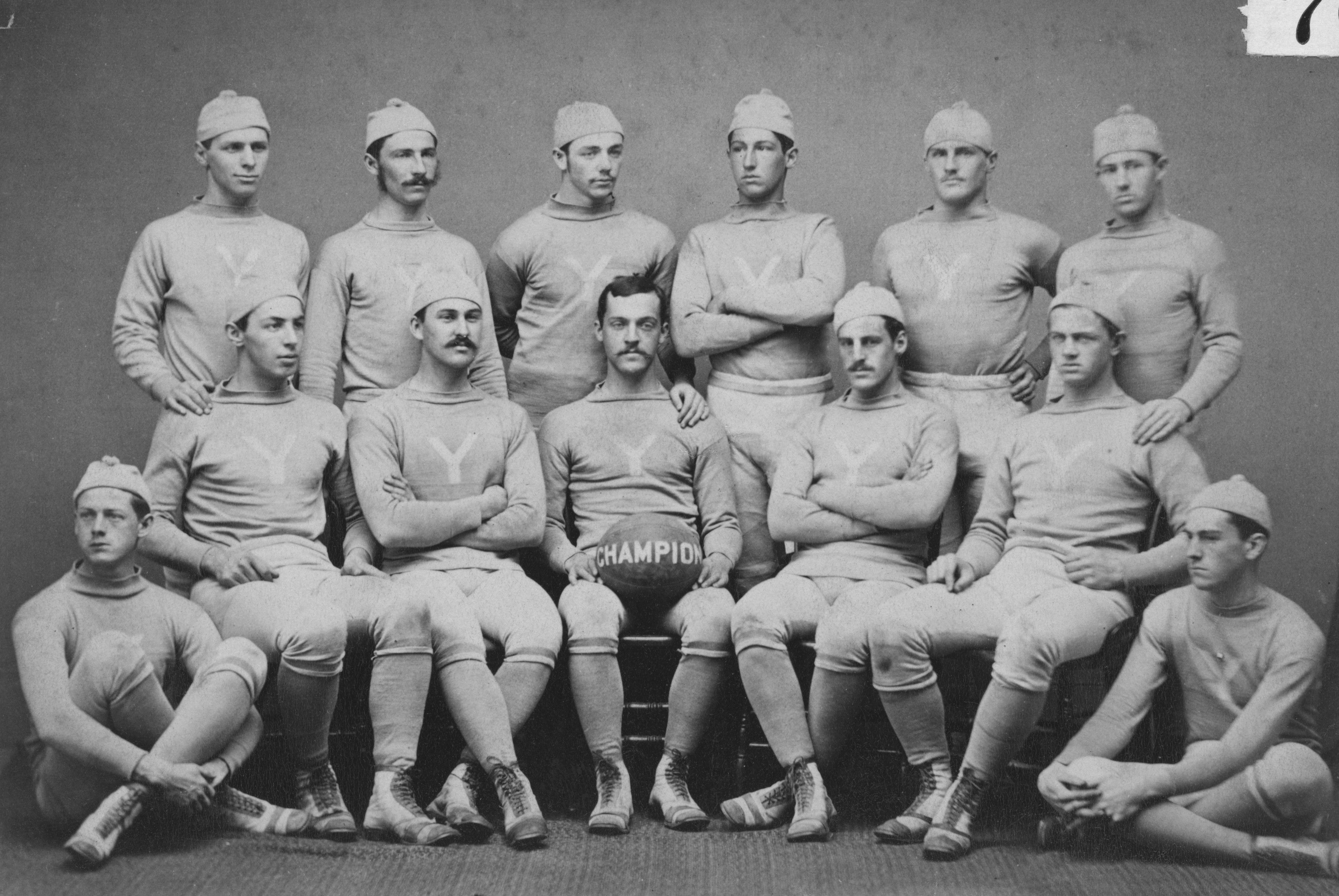

National champion
- Conference: Independent
- Record: 3–0
- Head coach: None
- Captain: Eugene V. Baker
- Home stadium: Hamilton Park

1876 college football records
	Conf.			Overall
Team	W	L	T	W		L		T
Yale		–		3	–	0	–	0
Rutgers		–		1	–	0	–	0
Harvard		–		3	–	1	–	0
Princeton		–		3	–	2	–	0
Stevens		–		2	–	2	–	0
CCNY		–		1	–	1	–	0
Penn		–		1	–	2	–	0
Columbia		–		1	–	3	–	0
Canada All-Stars		–		0	–	1	–	0
McGill		–		0	–	1	–	0
Northwestern		–		0	–	1	–	0
Philadelphia All-Stars		–		0	–	1	–	0
NYU		–		0	–	2	–	0

The 1876 Yale Bulldogs football team represented Yale University in the 1876 college football season. The team finished with a 3–0 record and was retroactively named national champion by the Billingsley Report, National Championship Foundation, and Parke H. Davis. The Yale team defeated rival Harvard for the first time. Walter Camp also played for the first time. The team's captain was Eugene V. Baker.

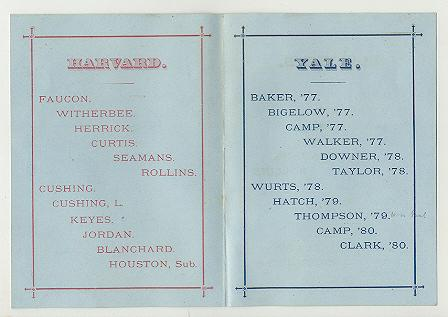
Harvard-Yale lineups

The Princeton-Yale matchup effectively decided the national championship after Princeton defeated Columbia. Thompson and Camp executed the first "legal" forward pass in football history. Early in the game, Camp ran for a good gain on a play, however when he was finally tackled, he threw the ball forward to O. D. Thompson, who ran for a touchdown. The Princeton players protested the play. Since the rules of football were still unclear in 1876, a coin toss was used by the referee to decide if the play stood. Yale won the toss and the touchdown stood.

== Schedule ==
Date	Time	Opponent	Site	Result	Attendance	Source
November 18	3:00 p.m.	Harvard	Hamilton Park; New Haven, CT (rivalry)	W 1–0	2,000	
November 30		vs. Princeton	St. George's Cricket Club; Hoboken, NJ (rivalry)	W 2–0	>1,000	
December 9	3:20 p.m.	vs. Columbia	St. George's Cricket Club; Hoboken, NJ	W 2–0		
