= 1876 Columbia football team =

American college football season

1876 Columbia football
- Conference: Independent
- Record: 1–3
- Head coach: None
- Captain: Edward W. Price

1876 college football records
	Conf.			Overall
Team	W	L	T	W		L		T
Yale		–		3	–	0	–	0
Rutgers		–		1	–	0	–	0
Harvard		–		3	–	1	–	0
Princeton		–		3	–	2	–	0
Stevens		–		2	–	2	–	0
CCNY		–		1	–	1	–	0
Penn		–		1	–	2	–	0
Columbia		–		1	–	3	–	0
Canada All-Stars		–		0	–	1	–	0
McGill		–		0	–	1	–	0
Northwestern		–		0	–	1	–	0
Philadelphia All-Stars		–		0	–	1	–	0
NYU		–		0	–	2	–	0

The 1876 Columbia football team represented Columbia University in the 1876 college football season. The team had no head coach, and compiled a record of 1–3. Edward W. Price served as team captain.

== Schedule ==
Date	Time	Opponent	Site	Result	Attendance	Source
November 11		at Stevens	grounds at foot of Ninth Street; Hoboken, NJ	L 3–5		
November 18		vs. Princeton	St. George's Cricket Club; Hoboken, NJ	L 0–3		
November 29		at Stevens	St. George's Cricket Club; Hoboken, NJ	W 4–0	200–300	
December 9	3:20 p.m.	vs. Yale	St. George's Cricket Club; Hoboken, NJ	L 0–2		
