= 1875 CCNY Lavender football team =

American college football season

1875 CCNY Lavender football
- Conference: Independent
- Record: 0–3 or 0–4
- Head coach: None

1875 college football records
	Conf.			Overall
Team	W	L	T	W		L		T
Harvard		–		4	–	0	–	0
Princeton		–		2	–	0	–	0
Columbia		–		4	–	1	–	1
Rutgers		–		1	–	1	–	1
Yale		–		2	–	2	–	0
Stevens		–		3	–	3	–	0
Tufts		–		0	–	1	–	0
NYU		–		0	–	1	–	0
Wesleyan		–		0	–	1	–	0
Bates		–		0	–	1	–	0
Canada All-Stars		–		0	–	2	–	0
CCNY		–		0	–	3	–	0

The 1875 CCNY Lavender football team was an American football team that represented the City College of New York during the 1875 college football season. The team had no known coach and played three or four games, all losses.

== Schedule ==
Date	Opponent	Site	Result
October 31	at Stevens	Hoboken, NJ	L 0–6
	Columbia	New York, NY	L 0–5
November 11	at Stevens	Hoboken, NJ	L 0–6
November 27	Columbia	New York, NY	L 0–6
