= 1875 Princeton Tigers football team =

American college football season

1875 Princeton Tigers football

National champion (Billingsley) Co-national champion (Davis)
- Conference: Independent
- Record: 2–0
- Head coach: None
- Captain: Collins Denny

1875 college football records
	Conf.			Overall
Team	W	L	T	W		L		T
Harvard		–		4	–	0	–	0
Princeton		–		2	–	0	–	0
Columbia		–		4	–	1	–	1
Rutgers		–		1	–	1	–	1
Yale		–		2	–	2	–	0
Stevens		–		3	–	3	–	0
Tufts		–		0	–	1	–	0
NYU		–		0	–	1	–	0
Wesleyan		–		0	–	1	–	0
Bates		–		0	–	1	–	0
Canada All-Stars		–		0	–	2	–	0
CCNY		–		0	–	3	–	0

The 1875 Princeton Tigers football team represented the College of New Jersey, then more commonly known as Princeton College, in the 1875 college football season. The team finished with a 2–0 record. Collins Denny, who later became a notable clergyman and professor of philosophy, was captain of the 1875 team.

On November 13, Princeton defeated Columbia by a 6–2 score. The New York Herald wrote: "The contest was short, sharp and decisive and attracted a considerable crowd."

The team was retroactively named national champion by the Billingsley Report and as co-national champion (along with Harvard and Columbia) by Parke H. Davis.

This season marked the last of four consecutive national championships, and one of 11 in a 13-year period between 1869 and 1881.

== Schedule ==
Date	Opponent	Site	Result	Source
November 13	Columbia	Princeton, NJ	W 6–2	
November 20	Stevens	Princeton, NJ	W 6–0	

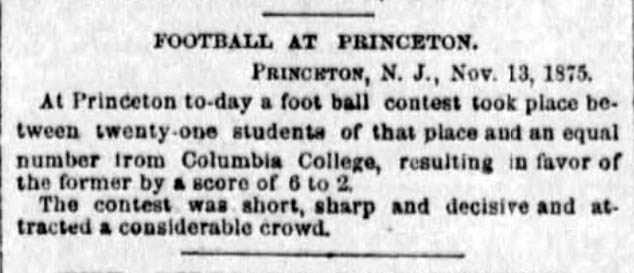
Chronicle of the Princeton v Columbia match, won by Princeton 6–2
