= 1875–76 Tufts Jumbos football team =

American college football season

1875–76 Tufts Jumbos football
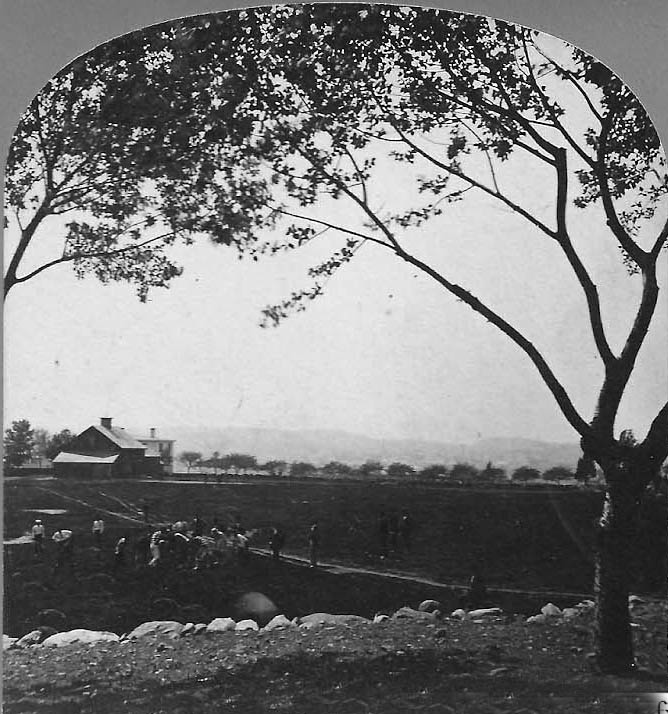
- Tufts vs. Harvard at Jarvis Field, October 1875
- Conference: Independent
- Record: 1–1
- Head coach: None

1875 college football records
	Conf.			Overall
Team	W	L	T	W		L		T
Harvard		–		4	–	0	–	0
Princeton		–		2	–	0	–	0
Columbia		–		4	–	1	–	1
Rutgers		–		1	–	1	–	1
Yale		–		2	–	2	–	0
Stevens		–		3	–	3	–	0
Tufts		–		0	–	1	–	0
NYU		–		0	–	1	–	0
Wesleyan		–		0	–	1	–	0
Bates		–		0	–	1	–	0
Canada All-Stars		–		0	–	2	–	0
CCNY		–		0	–	3	–	0

The 1875–76 Tufts Jumbos football team represented Tufts University in the 1875 college football season. Tufts' official program record for 1875 is 2–1 due to the school considering a June 4, 1875 victory over Harvard to be part of its 1875 season. The victory over Bates was the first intercollegiate football game in the state of Maine.

== Schedule ==
Date	Opponent	Site	Result
October 27	Harvard	Medford, MA	L 0–1
November 6	at Bates	Rand Field; Lewiston, ME	W 1–0
