= 1877 Yale Bulldogs football team =

American college football season

1877 Yale Bulldogs football
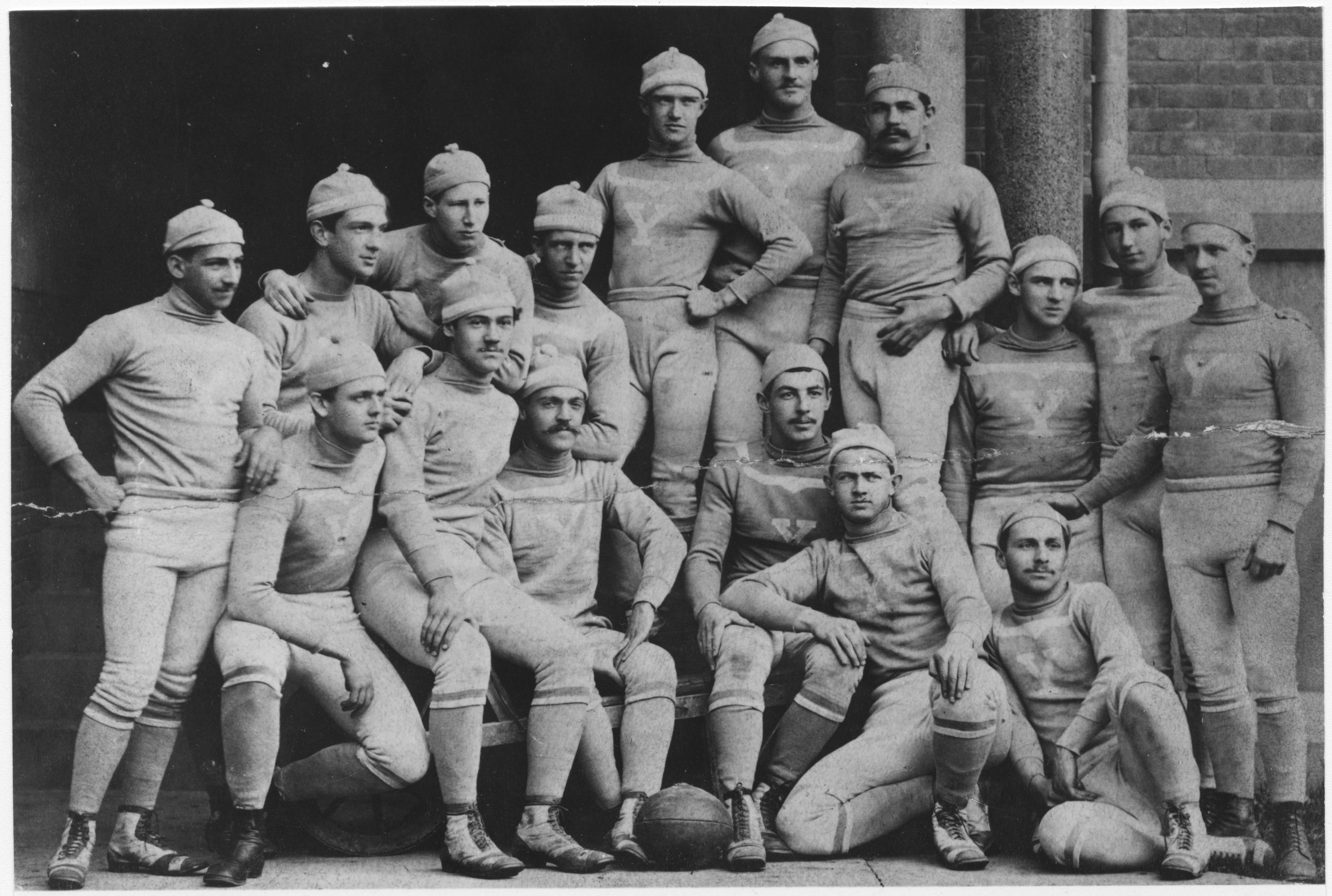

National champion (NCF) Co-national champion (Davis)
- Conference: Independent
- Record: 3–0–1
- Head coach: None
- Captain: Eugene V. Baker
- Home stadium: Hamilton Park

1877 college football records
	Conf.			Overall
Team	W	L	T	W		L		T
Yale		–		3	–	0	–	1
Princeton		–		2	–	0	–	1
Amherst		–		1	–	0	–	0
Harvard		–		3	–	1	–	0
Columbia		–		2	–	2	–	0
Rutgers		–		1	–	2	–	0
Stevens		–		1	–	3	–	0
Tufts		–		0	–	3	–	0

The 1877 Yale Bulldogs football team represented Yale University in the 1877 college football season. The team finished with a 3–0–1 record and was retroactively named national champion by the National Championship Foundation and co-national champion by Parke H. Davis.

== Schedule ==
Date	Opponent	Site	Result	Attendance	Source
November 3	Tufts	Hamilton Park; New Haven, CT	W 1–0		
November 21	Trinity (CT)	Hamilton Park; New Haven, CT	W 7–0		
November 24	Stevens	Hamilton Park; New Haven, CT	W 13–0		
December 8	vs. Princeton	St. George's Cricket Club grounds; Hoboken, NJ (rivalry)	T 0–0	2,000–3,000	

== Roster ==
- Eugene V. Baker
- Fayette J. Brown
- Frederic W. Brown
- Walter Camp
- George H. Clark
- William V. Downer
- John S. Harding
- Henry Ives
- Benjamin B. Lamb
- William A. Peters
- Edward W. Smith
- William H. Smith
- O. D. Thompson
- John Trumbull
- William J. Wakeman
- William L. R. Wurts
