= 1878 Amherst football team =

American college football season

1878 Amherst football
- Conference: Independent
- Record: 1–2–1
- Head coach: None
- Home stadium: Blake Field

1878 college football records
	Conf.			Overall
Team	W	L	T	W		L		T
Princeton		–		6	–	0	–	0
Yale		–		4	–	1	–	1
Columbia		–		0	–	0	–	1
CCNY		–		1	–	1	–	0
Stevens		–		1	–	1	–	2
Harvard		–		1	–	2	–	0
Penn		–		1	–	2	–	1
Rutgers		–		1	–	2	–	1
Amherst		–		1	–	3	–	0
Brown		–		0	–	1	–	0
Swarthmore		–		0	–	1	–	0

The 1878 Amherst football team was an American football team that represented Amherst College during the 1878 college football season. The team compiled a record of 1–2–1.

== Schedule ==
Date	Opponent	Site	Result	Source
November 2	at Yale	Hamilton Park; New Haven, CT	L 0–2	
November 9	at Harvard	Boston Baseball Grounds; Boston, MA	L 0–3	
November 13	Brown	Blake Field; Amherst, MA	W 1–0	
November 16	Yale	Blake Field; Amherst, MA	T 0–0	
