= 1876 Princeton Tigers football team =

American college football season

1876 Princeton Tigers football
- Conference: Independent
- Record: 3–2
- Head coach: None
- Captains: A. J. McCosh (fall); B. Nicoll (spring)

1876 college football records
	Conf.			Overall
Team	W	L	T	W		L		T
Yale		–		3	–	0	–	0
Rutgers		–		1	–	0	–	0
Harvard		–		3	–	1	–	0
Princeton		–		3	–	2	–	0
Stevens		–		2	–	2	–	0
CCNY		–		1	–	1	–	0
Penn		–		1	–	2	–	0
Columbia		–		1	–	3	–	0
Canada All-Stars		–		0	–	1	–	0
McGill		–		0	–	1	–	0
Northwestern		–		0	–	1	–	0
Philadelphia All-Stars		–		0	–	1	–	0
NYU		–		0	–	2	–	0

The 1876 Princeton Tigers football team represented the College of New Jersey, more commonly known as Princeton College, in the 1876 college football season. The team finished with a 3–2 record and outscored its opponents, 15–3, but lost to both Harvard and Yale. 1876 was the only year between 1872 and 1881 that Princeton did not claim at least a share of the national championship assigned retroactively by either the Billingsley Report, the National Championship Foundation, or Parke H. Davis. The captain of the team was A. J. McCosh in the fall and B. Nicoll in the spring of 1877.

== Schedule ==
Date	Opponent	Site	Result	Attendance	Source
November 11	at Penn	Philadelphia, PA (rivalry)	W 6–0		
November 18	at Columbia	St. George's Cricket Club; Hoboken, NJ	W 3–0		
November 25	Penn	Princeton, NJ	W 6–0		
November 30	vs. Yale	St. George's Cricket Club; Hoboken, NJ (rivalry)	L 0–2	>1,000	
April 28, 1877	at Harvard	Cambridge, MA (rivalry)	L 0–1	2,500	

== See also ==
- List of the first college football game in each US state
