= 1876 CCNY Lavender football team =

American college football season

1876 CCNY Lavender football
- Conference: Independent
- Record: 1–1
- Head coach: None

1876 college football records
	Conf.			Overall
Team	W	L	T	W		L		T
Yale		–		3	–	0	–	0
Rutgers		–		1	–	0	–	0
Harvard		–		3	–	1	–	0
Princeton		–		3	–	2	–	0
Stevens		–		2	–	2	–	0
CCNY		–		1	–	1	–	0
Penn		–		1	–	2	–	0
Columbia		–		1	–	3	–	0
Canada All-Stars		–		0	–	1	–	0
McGill		–		0	–	1	–	0
Northwestern		–		0	–	1	–	0
Philadelphia All-Stars		–		0	–	1	–	0
NYU		–		0	–	2	–	0

The 1876 College of the City of New York football team represented the City College of New York during the 1876 college football season. The team played in at least one game, losing 0–6 against Columbia. Another game, a win against NYU, has been listed in some sources, but not in others.

== Schedule ==
Date	Opponent	Site	Result	Source
November 4	Columbia		L 0–6	
	NYU (Note: Note: Sources covering the 1876 NYU Violets football team do not include reference to a game with CCNY.)		W ?	
