= 1875–76 Harvard Crimson football team =

American college football season

1875 Harvard Crimson football
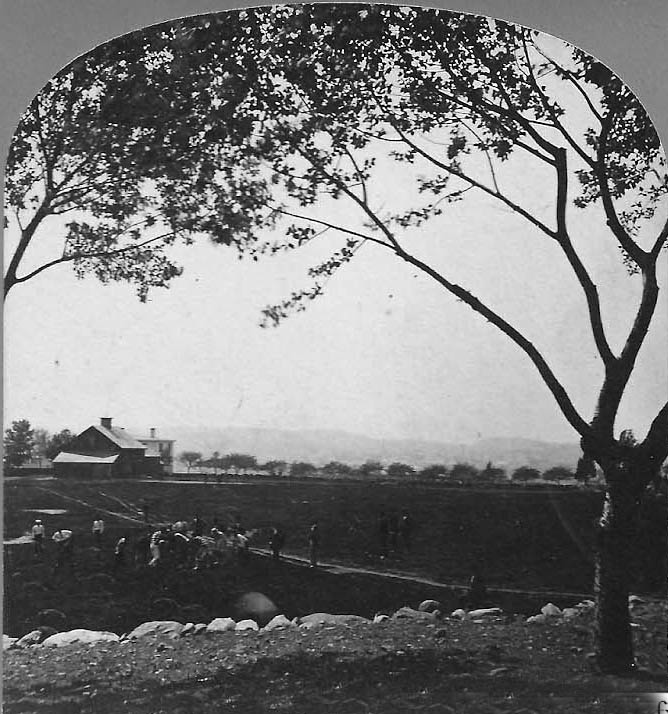
- Tufts vs. Harvard at College Hill, October 1875

National champion (NCF) Co-national champion (Davis)
- Conference: Independent
- Record: 4–0
- Head coach: None
- Captain: William A. Whiting

1875 college football records
	Conf.			Overall
Team	W	L	T	W		L		T
Harvard		–		4	–	0	–	0
Princeton		–		2	–	0	–	0
Columbia		–		4	–	1	–	1
Rutgers		–		1	–	1	–	1
Yale		–		2	–	2	–	0
Stevens		–		3	–	3	–	0
Tufts		–		0	–	1	–	0
NYU		–		0	–	1	–	0
Wesleyan		–		0	–	1	–	0
Bates		–		0	–	1	–	0
Canada All-Stars		–		0	–	2	–	0
CCNY		–		0	–	3	–	0

The 1875–76 Harvard Crimson football team represented Harvard University in the 1875 college football season. The team finished with a 4–0 record and was retroactively named as the national champion by the National Championship Foundation and as a co-national champion by Parke H. Davis. The team captain was William A. Whiting.

== Schedule ==
Date	Opponent	Site	Result	Source
October 23	at Canada All-Stars	Montreal, QC	W 1–0	
October 27	at Tufts	Medford, MA	W 1–0	
November 13	at Yale	Hamilton Park; New Haven, CT (rivalry)	W 4–0	
May 8, 1876	Canada All-Stars	Jarvis Field; Cambridge, MA	W 1–0	

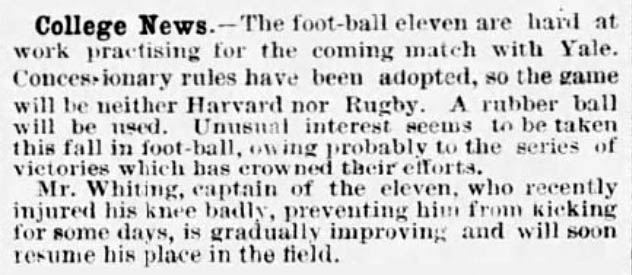
