= 1877 Columbia football team =

American college football season

1877 Columbia football
- Conference: Independent
- Record: 2–2
- Head coach: None
- Captain: Chas. DeH. Bower

1877 college football records
	Conf.			Overall
Team	W	L	T	W		L		T
Yale		–		3	–	0	–	1
Princeton		–		2	–	0	–	1
Amherst		–		1	–	0	–	0
Harvard		–		3	–	1	–	0
Columbia		–		2	–	2	–	0
Rutgers		–		1	–	2	–	0
Stevens		–		1	–	3	–	0
Tufts		–		0	–	3	–	0

The 1877 Columbia football team represented Columbia University in the 1877 college football season. The team had no head coach, and compiled a record of 2–2. Chas. DeH. Bower served as team captain.

== Schedule ==
Date	Time	Opponent	Site	Result	Attendance	Source
November 5	3:00 p.m.	vs. Harvard	St. George's Cricket Club grounds; Hoboken, NJ	L 0–6	400–500	
November 6		vs. Rutgers	St. George's Cricket Club grounds; Hoboken, NJ	W 6T–0		
November 13		at Stevens	St. George's Cricket Club grounds; Hoboken, NJ	W 1T–0		
November 17	2:40 p.m.	at Princeton	Princeton, NJ	L 3T–4G		
