= 1878 college football season =

American college football season

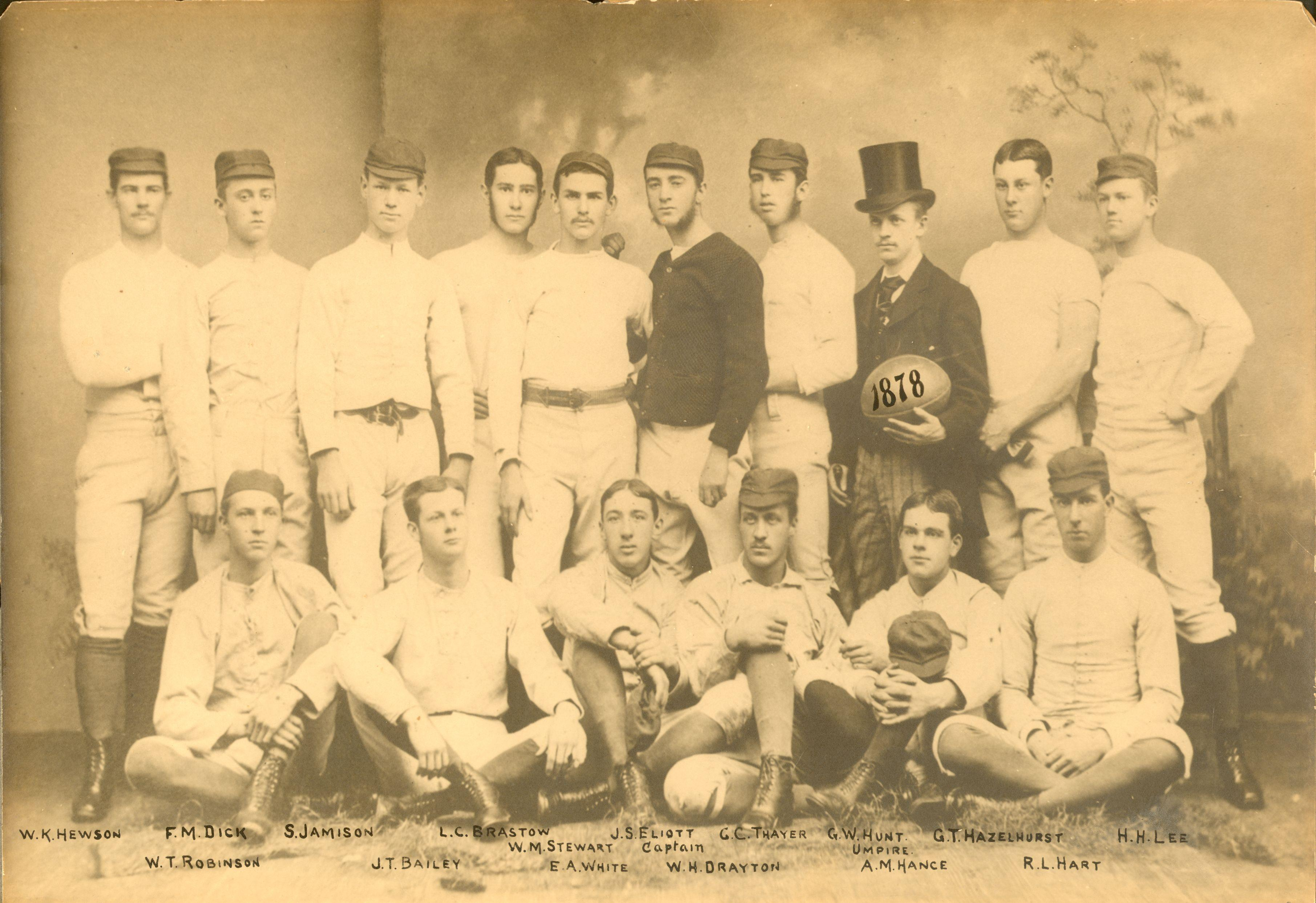
- 1878 Penn Quakers
- Total No. of teams: 11
- Regular season: October 19 to December 7
- Champion: Princeton

The 1878 college football season had no clear-cut champion, with the Official NCAA Division I Football Records Book listing Princeton as having been selected national champions.

== Conference and program changes ==
Team	Former conference	New conference
Brown Bears	Program established	Independent
Swarthmore Quakers	Program established	Independent

== Conference standings ==
1878 college football records
	Conf.			Overall
Team	W	L	T	W		L		T
Princeton		–		6	–	0	–	0
Yale		–		4	–	1	–	1
Columbia		–		0	–	0	–	1
CCNY		–		1	–	1	–	0
Stevens		–		1	–	1	–	2
Harvard		–		1	–	2	–	0
Penn		–		1	–	2	–	1
Rutgers		–		1	–	2	–	1
Amherst		–		1	–	3	–	0
Brown		–		0	–	1	–	0
Swarthmore		–		0	–	1	–	0
