= 1877 Princeton Tigers football team =

American college football season

1877 Princeton Tigers football
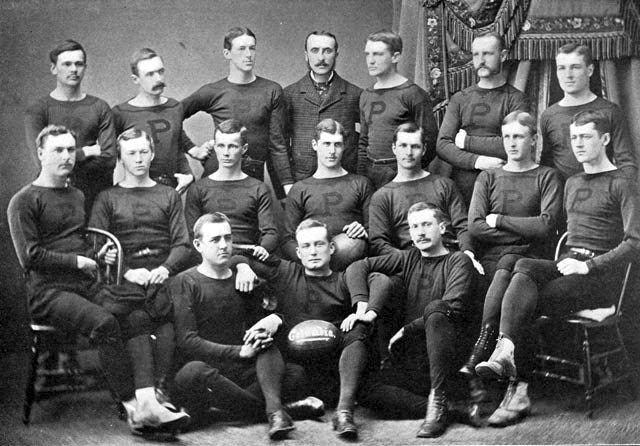

National champion (Billingsley) Co-national champion (Davis)
- Conference: Independent
- Record: 2–0–1
- Head coach: None
- Captain: W. Earl Dodge

1877 college football records
	Conf.			Overall
Team	W	L	T	W		L		T
Yale		–		3	–	0	–	1
Princeton		–		2	–	0	–	1
Amherst		–		1	–	0	–	0
Harvard		–		3	–	1	–	0
Columbia		–		2	–	2	–	0
Rutgers		–		1	–	2	–	0
Stevens		–		1	–	3	–	0
Tufts		–		0	–	3	–	0

The 1877 Princeton Tigers football team represented the College of New Jersey, then more commonly known as Princeton College, in the 1877 college football season. The team finished with a 2–0–1 record and was retroactively named national champion by the Billingsley Report and as co-national champion by Parke H. Davis. This season was Princeton's seventh national championship and one of 11 in a 13-year period between 1869 and 1881. Princeton played Harvard for the second time, earning its first victory over the Crimson. The captain of the team was W. Earl Dodge.

Sophomore Woodrow Wilson was elected as Princeton's football director in 1877. Football historian Parke H. Davis credited Wilson with coaching the 1877 team.

== Schedule ==
Date	Time	Opponent	Site	Result	Attendance	Source
November 3	2:30 p.m.	Harvard	St. George's Cricket Club grounds; Hoboken, NJ (rivalry)	W 1–0	1,000	
November 17	2:40 p.m.	Columbia	Princeton, NJ	W 4–0		
December 8		vs. Yale	St. George's Cricket Club grounds; Hoboken, NJ (rivalry)	T 0–0	2,000–3,000	
