= 1878 Penn Quakers football team =

American college football season

1878 Penn Quakers football
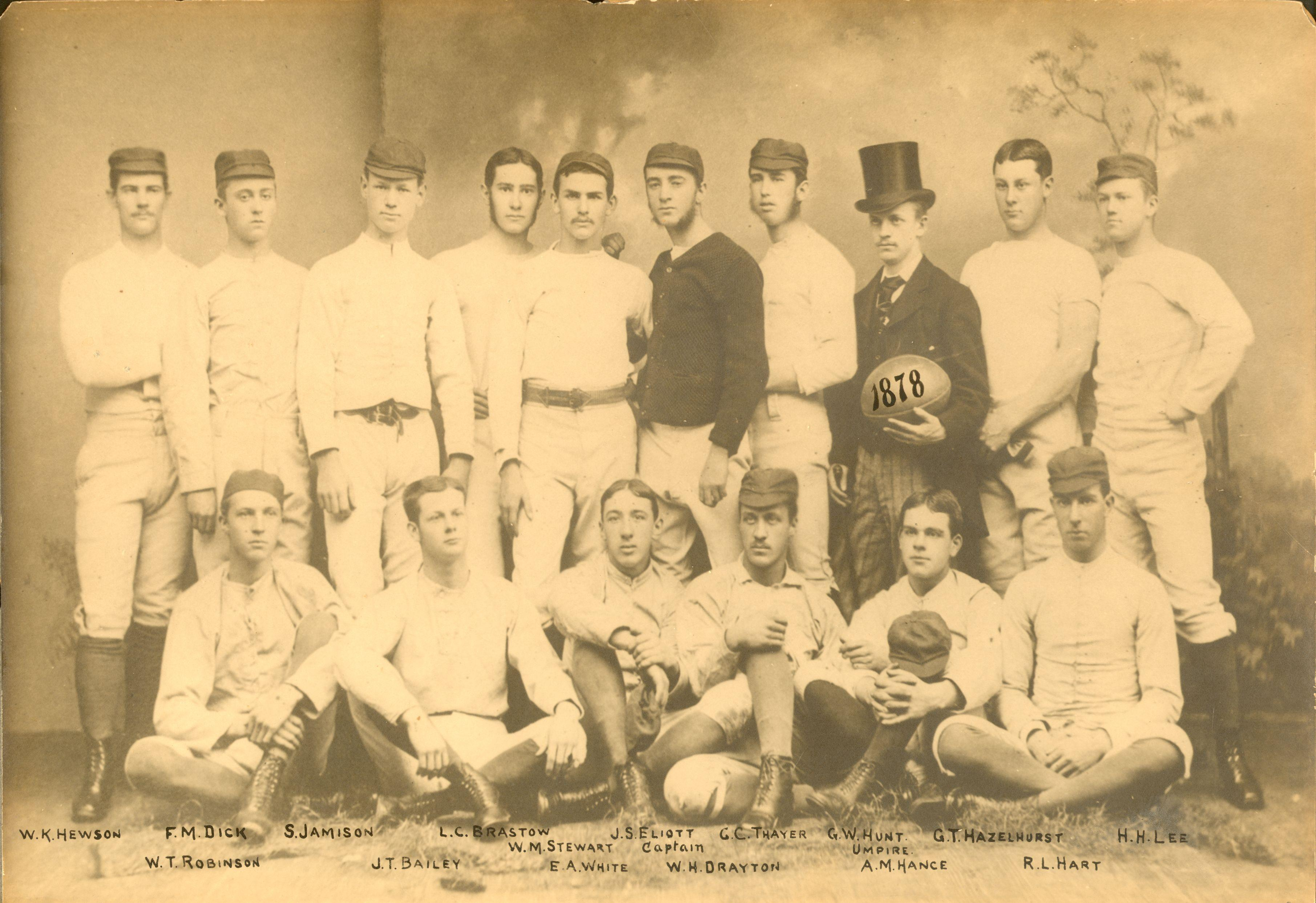
- Conference: Independent
- Record: 1–2–1
- Head coach: None
- Captain: John Elliot

1878 college football records
	Conf.			Overall
Team	W	L	T	W		L		T
Princeton		–		6	–	0	–	0
Yale		–		4	–	1	–	1
Columbia		–		0	–	0	–	1
CCNY		–		1	–	1	–	0
Stevens		–		1	–	1	–	2
Harvard		–		1	–	2	–	0
Penn		–		1	–	2	–	1
Rutgers		–		1	–	2	–	1
Amherst		–		1	–	3	–	0
Brown		–		0	–	1	–	0
Swarthmore		–		0	–	1	–	0

The 1878 Penn Quakers football team represented the University of Pennsylvania in the 1878 college football season. The team finished with a 1–2–1 record.

== Schedule ==
Date	Time	Opponent	Site	Result	Source
October 19		at Princeton	University grounds; Princeton, NJ (rivalry)	L 0–2	
November 2		Swarthmore	University grounds; Philadelphia, PA	W 9–0	
November 9	2:30 p.m.	Princeton	Germantown Cricket Club grounds; Philadelphia, PA	L 1–2	
November 16		vs. Columbia	St. George's Cricket Club grounds; Hoboken, NJ	T 0–0	
