= 1876 Northwestern University football team =

American college football season

1876 Northwestern football
- Conference: Independent
- Record: 0–1
- Head coach: None

1876 college football records
	Conf.			Overall
Team	W	L	T	W		L		T
Yale		–		3	–	0	–	0
Rutgers		–		1	–	0	–	0
Harvard		–		3	–	1	–	0
Princeton		–		3	–	2	–	0
Stevens		–		2	–	2	–	0
CCNY		–		1	–	1	–	0
Penn		–		1	–	2	–	0
Columbia		–		1	–	3	–	0
Canada All-Stars		–		0	–	1	–	0
McGill		–		0	–	1	–	0
Northwestern		–		0	–	1	–	0
Philadelphia All-Stars		–		0	–	1	–	0
NYU		–		0	–	2	–	0

The 1876 Northwestern University football team represented Northwestern University during the 1876 college football season. The first Northwestern football team played one game, losing to the Chicago Football Club with two goals from touchdown and three touchdowns scored.

== Schedule ==
Date	Opponent	Site	Result
February 22	Chicago Football Club	Evanston, IL	L 0–2
