= 1877 Tufts Jumbos football team =

American college football season

1877 Tufts Jumbos football
- Conference: Independent
- Record: 0–3
- Head coach: None

1877 college football records
	Conf.			Overall
Team	W	L	T	W		L		T
Yale		–		3	–	0	–	1
Princeton		–		2	–	0	–	1
Amherst		–		1	–	0	–	0
Harvard		–		3	–	1	–	0
Columbia		–		2	–	2	–	0
Rutgers		–		1	–	2	–	0
Stevens		–		1	–	3	–	0
Tufts		–		0	–	3	–	0

The 1877 Tufts Jumbos football team represented Tufts College—now known as Tufts University in the 1877 college football season. The team compiled a record of 0–3.

== Schedule ==
Date	Time	Opponent	Site	Result	Attendance	Source
October 23	3:25 p.m.	at Harvard	Boston Baseball Grounds; Boston, MA	L 0–3	500	
November 3		at Yale	Hamilton Park; New Haven, CT	L 0–1		
November 14		at Amherst	Blake Field; Amherst, MA	L 4–8		
