= 1875 Columbia football team =

American college football season

1875 Columbia football

Co-national champion (Parke H. Davis)
- Conference: Independent
- Record: 4–1–1
- Head coach: None
- Captain: Edward W. Price

1875 college football records
	Conf.			Overall
Team	W	L	T	W		L		T
Harvard		–		4	–	0	–	0
Princeton		–		2	–	0	–	0
Columbia		–		4	–	1	–	1
Rutgers		–		1	–	1	–	1
Yale		–		2	–	2	–	0
Stevens		–		3	–	3	–	0
Tufts		–		0	–	1	–	0
NYU		–		0	–	1	–	0
Wesleyan		–		0	–	1	–	0
Bates		–		0	–	1	–	0
Canada All-Stars		–		0	–	2	–	0
CCNY		–		0	–	3	–	0

The 1875 Columbia football team represented Columbia University in the 1875 college football season. The team finished with a 4–1–1 record and was retroactively named co-national champion by Parke H. Davis. They outscored their opponents 13–10. The team had no head coach. Edward W. Price served as team captain.

== Schedule ==
Date	Opponent	Site	Result	Source
November 2	at Rutgers	New Brunswick, NJ	T 1–1	
November 4	at Stevens	Hoboken, NJ	W 2–1	
unknown	CCNY	unknown	W 5–0	
November 13	at Princeton	Princeton, NJ	L 2–6	
November 27	CCNY	New York, NY	W 6–0	
December 4	at Yale	Hamilton Park; New Haven, CT	W 3–2	
