= 1877 Amherst football team =

American college football season

1877 Amherst football
- Conference: Independent
- Record: 1–0
- Head coach: None
- Home stadium: Blake Field

1877 college football records
	Conf.			Overall
Team	W	L	T	W		L		T
Yale		–		3	–	0	–	1
Princeton		–		2	–	0	–	1
Amherst		–		1	–	0	–	0
Harvard		–		3	–	1	–	0
Columbia		–		2	–	2	–	0
Rutgers		–		1	–	2	–	0
Stevens		–		1	–	3	–	0
Tufts		–		0	–	3	–	0

The 1877 Amherst football team represented Amherst College during the 1877 college football season.

== Schedule ==
Date	Opponent	Site	Result	Source
November 14	Tufts	Blake Field; Amherst, MA	W 8–4	
