= A. J. McCosh =

Irish-born American surgeon (1858–1908)

Profile
- Position: Back

Personal information
- Born: March 15, 1858; Belfast, Ireland
- Died: December 2, 1908 (aged 50); New York City, New York, U.S.

Career information
- College: Princeton (1874–1876)

Awards and highlights
- 2× National championship (1874, 1875)

Andrew James McCosh (March 15, 1858 – December 2, 1908) was a distinguished surgeon in New York City.

== Early life ==
McCosh was born on March 15, 1858, in Belfast, Ireland; the son of Scottish philosopher James McCosh. He attended Princeton University, where he was a college football player; captain of the 1876 team.
