= 1875 Rutgers Queensmen football team =

American college football season

1875 Rutgers Queensmen football
- Conference: Independent
- Record: 1–1–1
- Head coach: None
- Captain: Peter H. Miliken

1875 college football records
	Conf.			Overall
Team	W	L	T	W		L		T
Harvard		–		4	–	0	–	0
Princeton		–		2	–	0	–	0
Columbia		–		4	–	1	–	1
Rutgers		–		1	–	1	–	1
Yale		–		2	–	2	–	0
Stevens		–		3	–	3	–	0
Tufts		–		0	–	1	–	0
NYU		–		0	–	1	–	0
Wesleyan		–		0	–	1	–	0
Bates		–		0	–	1	–	0
Canada All-Stars		–		0	–	2	–	0
CCNY		–		0	–	3	–	0

The 1875 Rutgers Queensmen football team represented Rutgers University in the 1875 college football season. The Queensmen compiled a 1–1–1 record and outscored their opponents 8 to 5. The team had no coach, and its captain was Peter H. Miliken.

== Schedule ==
Date	Opponent	Site	Result	Source
October 24	Stevens	New Brunswick, NJ	W 6–0	
November 2	Columbia	New Brunswick, NJ	T 1–1	
November 6	at Yale	Hamilton Park; New Haven, CT	L 1–4	
