= 1875 Wesleyan Methodists football team =

American college football season

1875 Wesleyan Methodists football
- Conference: Independent
- Record: 0–1
- Head coach: None

1875 college football records
	Conf.			Overall
Team	W	L	T	W		L		T
Harvard		–		4	–	0	–	0
Princeton		–		2	–	0	–	0
Columbia		–		4	–	1	–	1
Rutgers		–		1	–	1	–	1
Yale		–		2	–	2	–	0
Stevens		–		3	–	3	–	0
Tufts		–		0	–	1	–	0
NYU		–		0	–	1	–	0
Wesleyan		–		0	–	1	–	0
Bates		–		0	–	1	–	0
Canada All-Stars		–		0	–	2	–	0
CCNY		–		0	–	3	–	0

The 1875 Wesleyan Methodists football team represented Wesleyan University during the 1875 college football season. The team lost its only game to Yale. They lost 6–0 in a 20-per-side game.

== Schedule ==
Date	Opponent	Site	Result
November 20	at Yale	Hamilton Park; New Haven, CT	L 0–6
