= 1876 Rutgers Queensmen football team =

American college football season

1876 Rutgers Queensmen football
- Conference: Independent
- Record: 1–0
- Head coach: None
- Captain: Andrew Raymond

1876 college football records
	Conf.			Overall
Team	W	L	T	W		L		T
Yale		–		3	–	0	–	0
Rutgers		–		1	–	0	–	0
Harvard		–		3	–	1	–	0
Princeton		–		3	–	2	–	0
Stevens		–		2	–	2	–	0
CCNY		–		1	–	1	–	0
Penn		–		1	–	2	–	0
Columbia		–		1	–	3	–	0
Canada All-Stars		–		0	–	1	–	0
McGill		–		0	–	1	–	0
Northwestern		–		0	–	1	–	0
Philadelphia All-Stars		–		0	–	1	–	0
NYU		–		0	–	2	–	0

The 1876 Rutgers Queensmen football team represented Rutgers University in the 1876 college football season. The Queensmen played only one intercollegiate game, a 3–2 victory over Stevens on November 1. The team had no coach, and its captain was Andrew Raymond.

== Schedule ==
Date	Opponent	Site	Result
November 1	Stevens		W 3–2
