= 1876–77 Harvard Crimson football team =

American college football season

1876 Harvard Crimson football
- Conference: Independent
- Record: 3–1
- Head coach: None
- Captain: Nathaniel Curtis

1876 college football records
	Conf.			Overall
Team	W	L	T	W		L		T
Yale		–		3	–	0	–	0
Rutgers		–		1	–	0	–	0
Harvard		–		3	–	1	–	0
Princeton		–		3	–	2	–	0
Stevens		–		2	–	2	–	0
CCNY		–		1	–	1	–	0
Penn		–		1	–	2	–	0
Columbia		–		1	–	3	–	0
Canada All-Stars		–		0	–	1	–	0
McGill		–		0	–	1	–	0
Northwestern		–		0	–	1	–	0
Philadelphia All-Stars		–		0	–	1	–	0
NYU		–		0	–	2	–	0

The 1876–77 Harvard Crimson football team represented Harvard University in the 1876 college football season. They finished with a 3–1 record. The team captain was Nathaniel Curtis.

On November 18, 1876, the second Harvard–Yale football rivalry game was played before a crowd of approximately 2,000 people at Hamilton Park in New Haven, Connecticut. Walter Camp played for Yale, which won the game 1–0.

== Schedule ==
Date	Time	Opponent	Site	Result	Attendance	Source
October 28	3:00 p.m.	at Canada All-Stars	Montreal, QC	W 2–0		
October 30	10:30 a.m.	at McGill	Montreal, QC	W 1–0		
November 18	3:00 p.m.	at Yale	Hamilton Park; New Haven, CT (rivalry)	L 0–1	2,000	
April 28, 1877		Princeton	Cambridge, MA (rivalry)	W 1–0	2,500	
