= Haverford–Swarthmore rivalry =

American college football rivalry

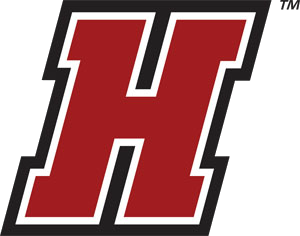
- Haverford Fords Swarthmore Garnet
- Sport: Football
- First meeting: 1879
- Latest meeting: 1971
- Trophy: Hood Trophy

The Haverford–Swarthmore rivalry is a rivalry between the Haverford Fords and Swarthmore Garnet. It used to include college football. In other sports they are both members of the Centennial Conference. The 1894 football game between Haverford and Swarthmore claims to have the first "action shot" photograph of a college football game. The winner of the contest was awarded the Hood Trophy. The two universities are in the same state of Pennsylvania.
