= 1877 Rutgers Queensmen football team =

American college football season

1877 Rutgers Queensmen football
- Conference: Independent
- Record: 1–2
- Head coach: None
- Captain: Andrew Raymond
- Home stadium: College Field

1877 college football records
	Conf.			Overall
Team	W	L	T	W		L		T
Yale		–		3	–	0	–	1
Princeton		–		2	–	0	–	1
Amherst		–		1	–	0	–	0
Harvard		–		3	–	1	–	0
Columbia		–		2	–	2	–	0
Rutgers		–		1	–	2	–	0
Stevens		–		1	–	3	–	0
Tufts		–		0	–	3	–	0

The 1877 Rutgers Queensmen football team represented Rutgers University in the 1877 college football season. The team compiled a 1–2 record and outscored their opponents, 6 to 5. The team had no coach, and its captain for the second consecutive year was Andrew Raymond.

== Schedule ==
Date	Opponent	Site	Result	Source
October 27	at Stevens	St. George's Cricket Club grounds; Hoboken, NJ	L 1–2	
November 6	vs. Columbia	St. George's Cricket Club grounds; Hoboken, NJ	L 0–6	
November 14	Stevens	New Brunswick, NJ	W 5–0	
