= Canada All-Stars =

Canadian college football team

- First season: 1875
- Last season: c. 1876
- Location: Montreal, Quebec
- Field: Montreal Cricket Club Grounds
- All-time record: 0–3 (.000)

The Canada All-Stars, also referred to as All-Canada, were one of the earliest college football teams. Representing the Football Association of Canada, it was composed of some of the top Canadian players at the time, and was best known for having played several games against the Harvard Crimson in the 1870s.

== Background ==
The 1869 Princeton vs. Rutgers football game is generally regarded as the "first college football game", although it was more similar to association football than present-day gridiron football. The Harvard Crimson, one of the earliest teams, played under a code known as the "Boston game" before adopting rugby football, which was played by Canadians, after a game under those rules in May 1874 with the McGill Redmen.

== History ==
=== 1875–76 season ===
1875 college football records
	Conf.			Overall
Team	W	L	T	W		L		T
Harvard		–		4	–	0	–	0
Princeton		–		2	–	0	–	0
Columbia		–		4	–	1	–	1
Rutgers		–		1	–	1	–	1
Yale		–		2	–	2	–	0
Stevens		–		3	–	3	–	0
Tufts		–		1	–	1	–	0
NYU		–		0	–	1	–	0
Wesleyan		–		0	–	1	–	0
Bates		–		0	–	1	–	0
Canada All-Stars		–		0	–	2	–	0
CCNY		–		0	–	3	–	0

At the start of October 1875, it was reported that the Harvard Crimson received an invitation for an "international football contest" from a team in Canada. They traveled to Montreal, Quebec, with 20 students on October 21, and practiced at the McGill field on October 22 in preparation for the game on October 23. The Canada All-Stars team, also referred to as All-Canada, featured 20 players from a "picked array of champions", representing the Football Association of Canada. The 15-man starting lineup for Canada was made up of the following players: Esdale, Eardley-Wilmot, Clouston, Creighton, Tatlow, Thomas, Gough, Taylor, McGibbon, Price, McGachen, Campbell, McLaren, Stewart and Ross; The Boston Globe noted that Taylor and McGibbon were both from McGill, Price "resides in Quebec", while the others were players from Montreal. The game was played on the Montreal cricket ground, under the Canadian rules, with the 15 Harvard players listed in the positions of "tenders", "half-tenders" and "rushers". Harvard ultimately won by a score of 1–0; the Boston Evening Transcript noted that Harvard "badly discomfited the picked array of champions ... at their own game", and The Boston Globe called it a "very decisive victory".

By April 1876, another game had been scheduled between Harvard and the All-Stars. In practicing, the All-Stars was divided up into two teams, "East Ontario" and "West Ontario", and played "trial matches" against each other. Unlike the first game, which was played at Canada, the second game – on May 8, 1876 – was played at Harvard in Cambridge, Massachusetts, on Jarvis Field. The All-Stars left for Massachusetts on May 6, and the squad was composed of the following players: (Note: Hope, Greenfield, Perram, Helliwell, Young, Palmer, Hare, Murray and Ker were all from Ontario, while Campbell, Eardley-Wilmot, Gough, Cross (spelled in some sources as Gross), Smith and Stewart were from Quebec; Eardley-Wilmot, Gough, Gross, Smith and Campbell were specifically from Montreal.) Harry Hope, (Note: Initially reported as captain, although Perram ultimately held the position.) A. J. Greenfield, Walter H. Perram, Helliwell, W. H. Young, P. Palmer, E. W. Hare, Murray, J. Ker, Stewart Campbell, Kenred Eardley-Wilmot, E. H. Gough, Phil Cross, Donald M. Stewart, and A. St. A. Smith. The game was described as having "excited so much interest and attracted so much attention," with it taking place in front of 5,000 spectators at 3:00 p.m. The play was noted to be "hotly contested" and "very exciting", with Harvard ultimately winning by one goal. The All-Stars–Harvard match took one hour and 30 minutes to complete, and at halftime the teams switched sides.

The Gazette reported that after the coin toss, "the game commenced in earnest, each side doing their level best for supremacy. The Canadians appeared to have the advantage during the first three quarters of an hour, and kept the ball well down to their opponents' goals, the defence being very strong, however. The ball would come up, and the Canadian defence, in the nick of time, would seize their opportunity, and by a 'rush' bring it to mid-field, and by a little sharp play pass it to one of the rushers, and down it would go, making things lively ... But soon the Canadians began to show the effects of the knocking about of the train, while the superb condition of the Harvards served them in good stead ... [after] three-quarters of an hour's hard play ... with the wind in their favor, the Harvard men in a short time put the ball down to the Canadians' goal; there was a short, sharp scrimmage, and the ball was cleverly thrown to Seamans, that prince of kickers, who kicked the goal for his side ... Both sides were pretty well exhausted by the severity of the play, and though the Canadians did not secure a victory, they had the best of play nearly all through." The Ottawa Daily Citizen said that Canada was at a "great disadvantage" due to having not practiced enough together, and also noted that several players from Ontario were not as well-trained as advertised, although it stated that Perram, captain, was an exception, whom they described as playing a "splendid game ... there was admittedly no rival for him on the Harvard side." The All-Stars thus finished with a record of 0–2, while Harvard went undefeated with four wins in four games and became the college football champions for the 1875–76 season.

==== Schedule ====
Date	Time	Opponent	Site	Result	Attendance
October 23, 1875		Harvard	Montreal Cricket Club Grounds; Montreal, QC	L 0–1	
May 8, 1876	3:00 p.m.	at Harvard	Jarvis Field; Cambridge, MA	L 0–1	5,000
All times are in Eastern time

=== 1876 season ===
1876 college football records
	Conf.			Overall
Team	W	L	T	W		L		T
Yale		–		3	–	0	–	0
Rutgers		–		1	–	0	–	0
Harvard		–		3	–	1	–	0
Princeton		–		3	–	2	–	0
Stevens		–		2	–	2	–	0
CCNY		–		1	–	1	–	0
Penn		–		1	–	2	–	0
Columbia		–		1	–	3	–	0
Canada All-Stars		–		0	–	1	–	0
McGill		–		0	–	1	–	0
Northwestern		–		0	–	1	–	0
Philadelphia All-Stars		–		0	–	1	–	0
NYU		–		0	–	2	–	0

By mid-October 1876, arrangements were being made for a third game between Harvard and the All-Stars. Although initially scheduled for October 30, it was played at the Montreal Cricket Club Grounds on October 28, at 3:00 p.m. It was reported that "The attendance was large, and a great interest manifested in the game." The Canadian team consisted of the following players, listed with their residence or club team: Perram, Toronto; K. Eardley-Wilmot, Ottawa; E. Gough, J. D. Molson and Stuart Campbell, Montreal Football Club; A. R. Irwin and S. M. Blaiklock, Brittania Football Club; J. Scriver, E. T. Taylor and H. Abbott, McGill University; as well as five others from Ontario. Harvard ultimately won the third and final game of the series by a score of 2–0, with two goals and two touchdowns, and the All-Stars nothing.

One source also mentioned a victory for the All-Stars against a team known as "All-England"; however, this has not been verified.

==== Schedule ====
Date	Time	Opponent	Site	Result	Attendance
October 28, 1876	3:00 p.m.	Harvard	Montreal Cricket Club Grounds; Montreal, QC	L 0–2	"large"
All times are in Eastern time
