= Swarthmore football, 1878–1887 =

American college football seasons

The Swarthmore football team (later known as the Swarthmore Garnet Tide) represented Swarthmore College in American football. Swarthmore was the 15th oldest college football program in the United States. The football program started in 1878 with a game against Penn. The program played no more than two games per year until 1885 when it played a six-game schedule. There was no team in 1880 and 1881. The team did not hire a coach until 1888 when Jacob K. Shell began his 11-year tenure as head coach. This article covers the program's early years prior to the hiring of Shell as the school's first head football coach.

== 1878 ==
1878 Swarthmore football
- Conference: Independent
- Record: 0–1
- Head coach: None

The 1878 Swarthmore football team represented Swarthmore during the 1878 college football season. Swarthmore played its first football game on November 2, 1878, against the 1878 Penn Quakers football team. The game was played in 45-minute halves with Penn ending up victorious by a 9–0 score. Swarthmore was just the 15th school to play football in the whole United States, and the second to play football in the state Pennsylvania (after Penn).

Date	Opponent	Site	Result	Source
November 2	Penn	University grounds; Philadelphia	L 0–9	

== 1879 ==
1879 Swarthmore football
- Conference: Independent
- Record: 0–1
- Head coach: None

The 1879 Swarthmore football team represented Swarthmore College during the 1879 college football season. This was the second season of Swarthmore football.

The season saw the first contest with rival Haverford, to be one of the longest running rivalries. (Note: Penn, Haverford, and Swarthmore are all Quaker schools. Haverford and Swarthmore both no longer have football programs.) The score of the contest is recorded as Haverford 1 goal, 1 touchdown, and 1 safety touchdown, and Swarthmore 13 safety touchdowns. According to The Haverfordian, "The day, as regards temperature and brightness, was all that could be desired, though the frost of the previous night made the footing somewhat uncertain." The starting lineup for Swarthmore against Haverford was Caley, Carter, Seaman, Field, Butler, Powell, and Grundy at forward; Browning, Moore, Thomas at halfback; and Sharpless at fullback.

The rivalry with Haverford was not renewed until the 1882 season, and Swarthmore did not achieve a win the series until 1883. "After the game of 1879, possibly because of Swarthmore's defeat that year, there was a lapse until 1883."

Earlier in the season, the team played a game against Pennsylvania Military Academy (later renamed Widener University), but the game's score is unknown.

Date	Opponent	Site	Result	Source
November 1	Pennsylvania Military Academy	Chester, PA	Unknown	
December 13	Haverford	(rivalry)	L 0–1	

== 1882 ==
1882 Swarthmore football
- Conference: Independent
- Record: 0–1
- Head coach: None

The 1882 Swarthmore football team represented Swarthmore during the 1882 college football season.

Date	Opponent	Site	Result	Source
March 21	Haverford	Swarthmore, PA (rivalry)	L 0–1	

== 1883 ==
1883 Swarthmore football
- Conference: Independent
- Record: 1–1
- Head coach: None

The 1883 Swarthmore football team represented Swarthmore during the 1883 college football season.

Date	Opponent	Site	Result	Source
November 17	at Haverford	Haverford, PA (rivalry)	W 12–9	
	at Haverford	Haverford, PA	L 8–16	

== 1884 ==
1884 Swarthmore football
- Conference: Independent
- Record: 0–1
- Head coach: None

The 1884 Swarthmore football team represented Swarthmore during the 1884 college football season.

Date	Opponent	Site	Result	Source
November 29	Haverford	Swarthmore, PA (rivalry)	L 6–10	

== 1885 ==
1885 Swarthmore football
- Conference: Independent
- Record: 4–2
- Head coach: None

The 1885 Swarthmore football team represented Swarthmore during the 1885 college football season.

Date	Time	Opponent	Site	Result	Source
October 10		at Pennsylvania Military	Chester, PA	W 56–4	
October 14	3:05 p.m.	Penn	University Athletic Grounds; Philadelphia, PA	L 6–68	
November 7		at Haverford	Haverford, PA (rivalry)	L 10–40	
November 14		at Dickinson	Carlisle, PA	W 36–6	
November 25		Swarthmore alumni	Swarthmore, PA	W 32–6	
November 28		at Johns Hopkins	Oriole Park; Baltimore, MD	W 16–0	

== 1886 ==
1886 Swarthmore football
- Conference: Independent
- Record: 1–1
- Head coach: None

The 1886 Swarthmore football team represented Swarthmore during the 1886 college football season.

During the October 23 game against Dickinson, a Dickinson player, E. H. Garrison, was killed. Garrison was carrying the ball when he was tackled by Sweet of Swarthmore. Garrison fell underneath Sweet, hitting his shoulder. The grounds were used as a baseball diamond as well, and Garrison fell onto the pitcher's mound which had been filled with gravel. Garrison was taken to a doctor's office for treatment but was not revived. One newspaper account described the reaction to the accident: "All merriment was hushed and the usually noisy crowd was awe-stricken. The grim monster had come into their midst with such a suddenness that they could find no expression for their grief."

Date	Opponent	Site	Result	Source
October 6	at Penn	Philadelphia, PA	Cancelled	
October 13	Lafayette	Swarthmore, PA	L 12–20	
October 23	at Dickinson	Carlisle, PA	W 28–15	

== 1887 ==
1887 Swarthmore football
- Conference: Independent
- Record: 2–2
- Head coach: None

The 1887 Swarthmore football team represented Swarthmore during the 1887 college football season.

Date	Opponent	Site	Result	Source
October 8	at Lehigh	Bethlehem, PA	L 0–24	
October 22	at Lafayette	The Quad; Easton, PA	L 6–31	
November 5	Haverford	Swarthmore, PA (rivalry)	W 30–16	
November 12	Dickinson	Swarthmore, PA	W 22–6	
