= Rutgers Scarlet Knights football =

Football team of Rutgers University

2026 Rutgers Scarlet Knights football team
- First season: 1869; 157 years ago (Note: The date is set after the first de facto college football game held in 1869 between Princeton and Rutgers Universities. It is considered the first football game in the US although it was played with rules based on 1863 rules that disallowed carrying or throwing the ball.)
- Athletic director: Keli Zinn
- Head coach: Greg Schiano; 18th season, 101–111 (.476)
- Location: Piscataway, NJ
- Stadium: SHI Stadium (capacity: 52,454)
- NCAA division: Division I FBS
- Conference: Big Ten
- Colors: Scarlet
- All-time record: 686–710–42 (.492)
- Bowl record: 7–6 (.538)

National championships
- Claimed: 1869

Conference championships
- Big East: 2012

Division championships
- MAC University: 1958, 1960, 1961
- Consensus All-Americans: 3
- Rivalries: Maryland (rivalry); Temple (rivalry); Princeton (rivalry)

Uniforms
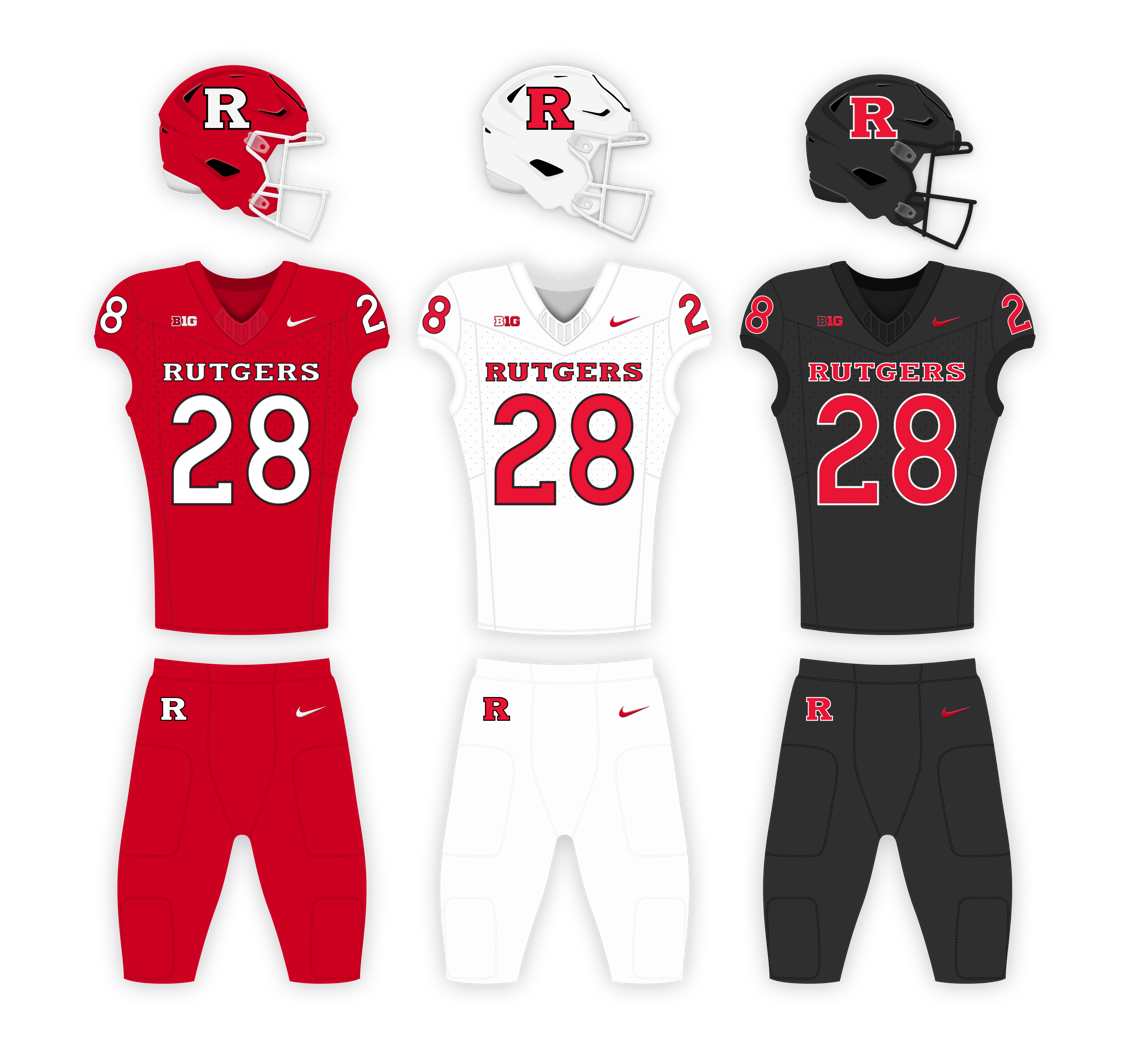
- Fight song: The Bells Must Ring
- Mascot: Sir Henry, The Scarlet Knight
- Marching band: Marching Scarlet Knights
- Outfitter: Nike
- Website: scarletknights.com

The Rutgers Scarlet Knights football program represents Rutgers, The State University of New Jersey in college football. The Scarlet Knights compete in the Big Ten Conference as a member of the Football Bowl Subdivision (FBS) of the National Collegiate Athletic Association (NCAA). Rutgers plays its home games at SHI Stadium in Piscataway, New Jersey, and is currently led by head coach Greg Schiano.

Rutgers is considered the birthplace of college football, having defeated Princeton 6–4 in the first intercollegiate football game on November 6, 1869, in New Brunswick, New Jersey. The team, then known as the Queensmen, finished the inaugural 1869 season with a 1–1 record and claims the 1869 national championship. Rutgers later won Middle Atlantic Conference University Division championships in 1958, 1960, and 1961. The 1961 team completed the first undefeated season in program history at 9–0, while the 1976 team finished 11–0 and was ranked No. 17 in the final AP Poll.

Rutgers joined the Big East Conference for football in 1991 and experienced a resurgence under Schiano during the 2000s. The 2006 team finished 11–2, reached a program-high No. 7 ranking in the AP Poll, and earned the program's first bowl victory with a 37–10 win over Kansas State in the 2006 Texas Bowl. The Scarlet Knights later won a share of the Big East championship in 2012. Following one season in the American Athletic Conference, Rutgers joined the Big Ten Conference in 2014. The Scarlet Knights have appeared in 13 bowl games, compiling a 7–6 postseason record.

Rutgers has longstanding regional rivalries with Princeton, Maryland, and Temple. The rivalry with Princeton dates to the first intercollegiate football game in 1869.

== History ==
=== Early history (1869–1958) ===
Marker commemorating the first college football game, played at Rutgers in New Brunswick

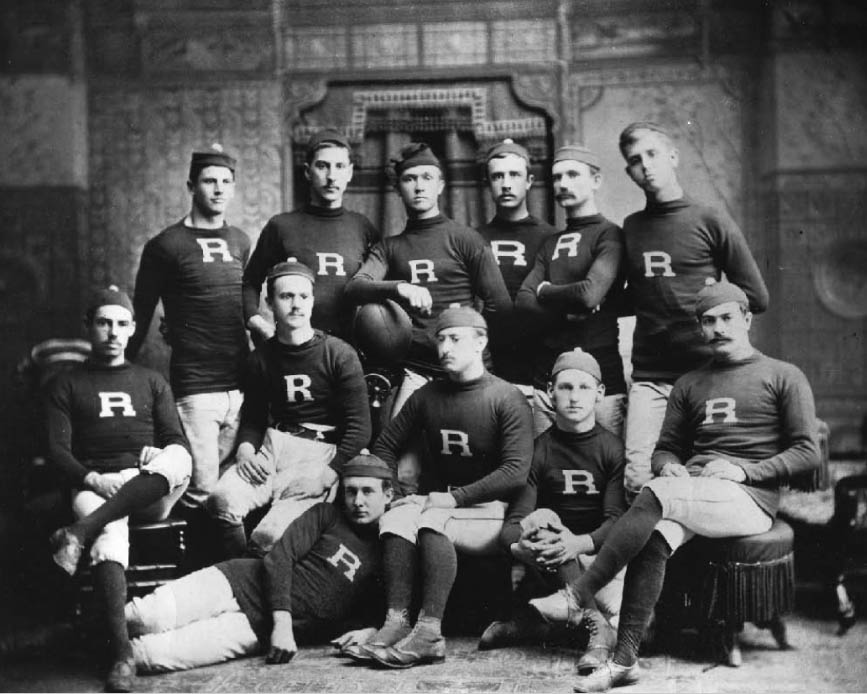
Rutgers football team in 1882

On November 6, 1869, Rutgers University and Princeton University competed in the first intercollegiate football game. The site for the contest was a small plot of land on what is now College Avenue on Rutgers' campus in New Brunswick, New Jersey. The structure of the game resembled more of a soccer and rugby-style contest in which players were allowed to kick and bat the ball with their fists and hands, instead of modern-day football. At the time, Rutgers was referred to as the Queensmen, a homage to the school's chartered name of Queen's College. The Rutgers squad was captained by William J. Leggett and donned scarlet kerchiefs atop their heads in an effort to distinguish between the two teams. Rutgers won the contest by a score of 6–4. A week after the first game was held in New Brunswick, Rutgers visited Princeton for a second matchup. This time, Princeton prevailed by a score of 8–0. Rutgers and Princeton had planned for a third game in the 1869 season, but the contest never took place due to fears that the games were interfering with the students' studies. Thus, both schools would end the season with a record of 1–1. From 1929 to 1975, Rutgers was a member of the Middle Three Conference, which consisted of a round-robin against Lafayette College and Lehigh University. J. Wilder Tasker served as the head football coach of the Queensmen football program for seven seasons, from 1931 to 1937. Under his leadership, the Scarlet Knights compiled a record of 31–27–5. Tasker was replaced by Harvey Harman, who led the team from 1938 through the 1940s and into the 1950s (Rutgers did not field a football team from 1942 to 1946 due to World War II). Harvey Harman's record was 33–26–1 in a total of 14 seasons. Succeeding Tasker was John Stiegman, who compiled a record of 22–15 in four seasons. Starting in 1940, the 'conference champion' received the Little Brass Cannon. Following Lehigh's capture of the Little Brass Cannon in 1951, Rutgers became an independent team in 1952, Rutgers still played games against Lafayette and the Middle Three round-robin in the 1953 season.

=== John Bateman era (1960–1972) ===
John Bateman succeeded Stiegman and coached the Scarlet Knights for 13 seasons, compiling a record of 73–51. After compiling an 8–1 record in their first year under Bateman, the 1961 Rutgers Scarlet Knights football team compiled a perfect 9–0 record, the first undefeated season in program history, and won the Middle Atlantic Conference University Division championship. Center Alex Kroll was the 1961 team captain and selected as a consensus All-American. In 1961, Rutgers was one of two major teams to compile a perfect season, Alabama being the other. The Scarlet Knights were considered a contender for the Rose Bowl, but were not selected because university president Mason Welch Gross did not express the same interest with the Rose Bowl's organizers. Rutgers also compiled an 8–2 campaign in 1968. Although Rutgers continued to be a part of the Middle Three until 1975, Rutgers became a member of the Middle Atlantic Conference from 1958 to 1961. Rutgers won the conference championship in three of those four years (1958, 1960, and 1961) and was awarded the Wilmington Touchdown Club Trophy. Rutgers then again became independent, and then remained so until it joined the Big East Conference in 1991.

=== Frank Burns era (1973–1983) ===
Frank Burns was promoted from assistant coach, to the head coach after John Bateman's departure, under Burns, the Scarlet Knights enjoyed eight consecutive winning seasons, which included a 9–2 campaign in the 1975 season, and a perfect 11–0 season in 1976, followed by winning records of 8–3, 9–3, 8–3 and 7–4 seasons. In 1976, Rutgers declined an invitation to play an unranked McNeese State University team at the inaugural Independence Bowl, by feeling snubbed by more prestigious bowl games despite their 11–0 perfect season.

In 1978, Rutgers appeared in its first bowl game, the Garden State Bowl, which it lost to Arizona State by a score of 34–18. However, with consecutive 5–6 campaigns in 1981 and 1982, and a 3–8 record in 1983, resulted in Frank Burns being dismissed as Rutgers head coach. Frank Burns left Rutgers with a 78–43–1 overall record.

=== Dick Anderson era (1984–1989) ===
Penn State offensive line coach Dick Anderson was hired to replace Burns in 1984. The Scarlet Knights mostly struggled during Dick Anderson's tenure as head coach despite winning records in 1984, 1986 and 1987, which resulted in Anderson's firing after the end of the 1989 season.

=== Doug Graber era (1990–1995) ===
Tampa Bay Buccaneers defensive coordinator Doug Graber took over the Rutgers football program starting in 1990. Under Graber's tutelage, the Scarlet Knights achieved winning seasons in 1991 and 1992, but struggled to maintain consistency and, following a 4–7 campaign in 1995, Graber was fired with two years remaining on his original seven-year contract. Rutgers joined the Big East Conference in all sports in 1991. The team struggled to compete throughout the 1990s, facing powerhouse teams from Virginia Tech, Miami, and West Virginia on a yearly basis.

=== Terry Shea era (1996–2000) ===
Rutgers on offense against Navy in 2004

Longtime assistant coach Terry Shea was hired to replace Graber in December 1995, However, the Rutgers program suffered its worst five-year stretch in program history. Shea's tenure not only failed to produce a single winning season, it failed to win more than three games in a single season with the exception of a 5–6 campaign in 1998. After the 2000 season Shea was fired.

=== Greg Schiano era (2001–2011) ===
Greg Schiano took over as head coach after Terry Shea's termination. Despite some early recruiting successes, his first four years resulted in losing seasons. In 2005, the team achieved its first winning season since Graber's 7-4 campaign in 1992, which notched them a rematch bowl berth against Arizona State in the 2005 Insight Bowl. In that game, Rutgers lost 45–40 in a shootout, but was led by a 100-yard rushing performance from freshman running back Ray Rice. In 2006, Rutgers started the season with nine straight wins, culminating in a momentous eighteen-point comeback victory at home against the Louisville Cardinals, ranked third at the time, in what became known as the "Pandemonium In Piscataway." Kicker Jeremy Ito sealed the 28–25 win with a field goal.

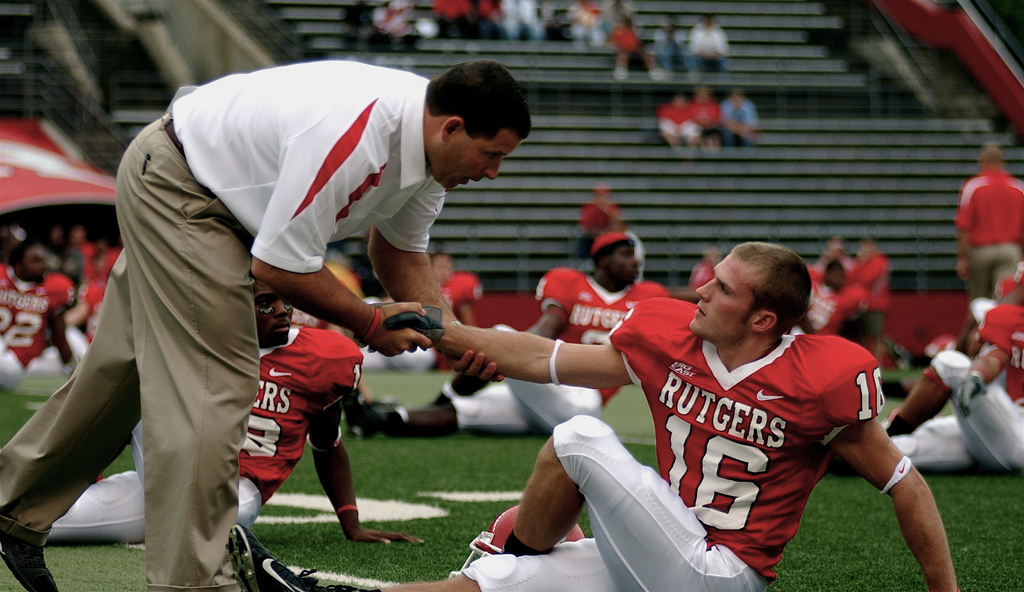
Schiano interacting with a player in 2006

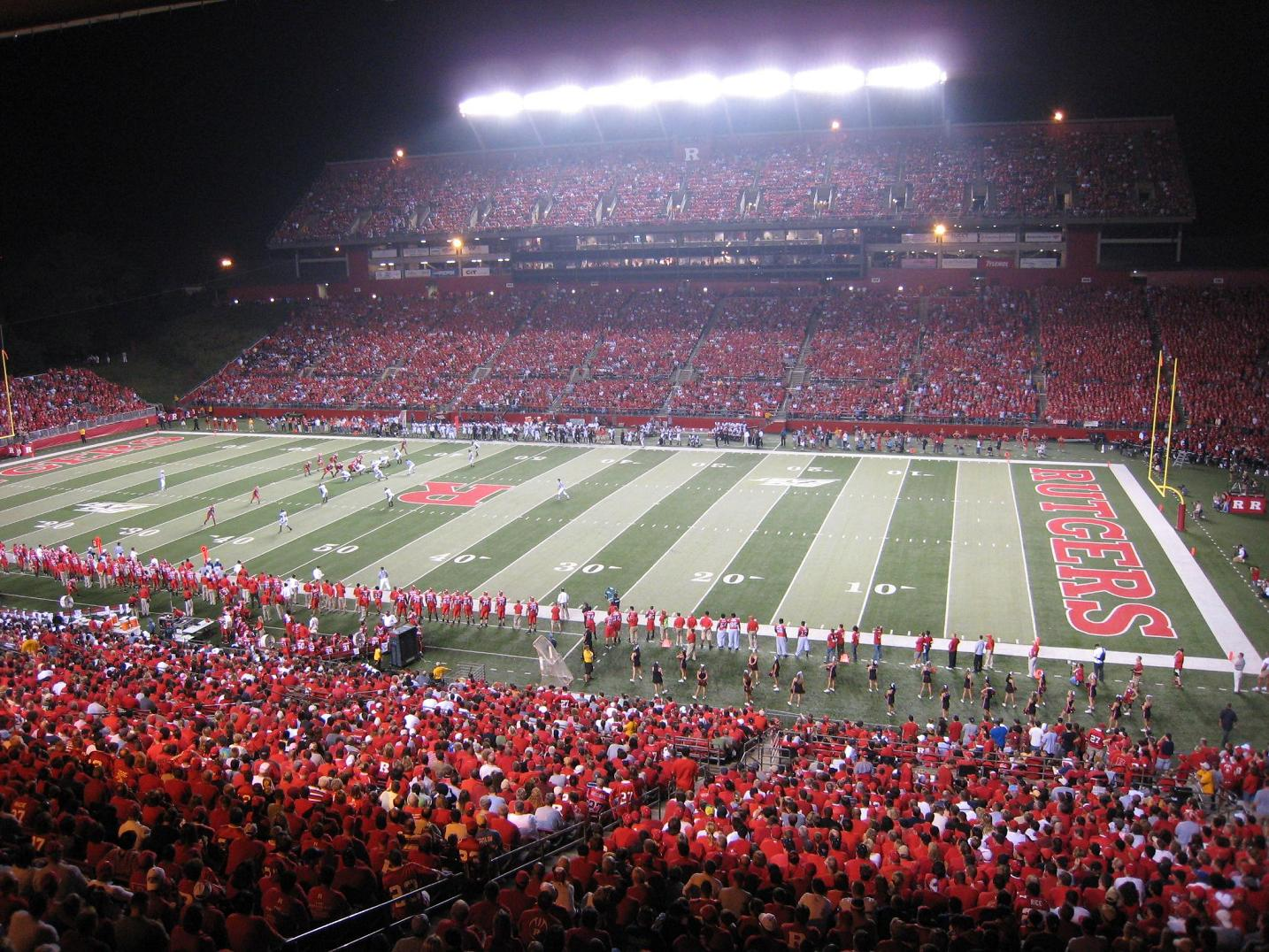
SHI Stadium in October 2007

The following week, Rutgers got to its highest polling rank in school history, topping out at No. 7 in the AP Poll and No. 6 in the BCS. At year's end, the Scarlet Knights had a record of 11–2 and a postseason rank of No. 12 in the AP Poll, with a victory in the postseason: Rutgers beat Kansas State 37–10 in the Texas Bowl. It was the first bowl win in Rutgers history. The following year, Rutgers received its first preseason rank in the AP Poll at No. 16. 2007 was an up-and-down year for the Scarlet Knights, rising into the Top 10 for the second consecutive year, only to suffer back-to-back losses. Highlighted by a 30–27 upset over second ranked South Florida, and ended with an 8–5 record and a 52–30 victory over Ball State in the International Bowl. 2008 saw Rutgers again go 8–5, beginning the year 1–5 with a slow start, before seven straight victories to finish the season, winning 29–23 in the PapaJohns.com Bowl with a victory over NC State.

In 2009, Rutgers entered the season as the favorite to win the Big East Conference. However, the season opener was a loss to Cincinnati, who would end up with a perfect regular season—and the conference title. Rutgers finished the season with a 9–4 record, defeating UCF 45–24 in the St. Petersburg Bowl. Rutgers' streak of five consecutive bowl appearances ended in 2010, a year marred by a spinal cord injury suffered by defensive lineman Eric LeGrand in the sixth game of the season against Army. Rutgers lost its final six games that year, and finished with a record of 4–8. In 2011 Rutgers finished 9–4 with a postseason win over Iowa State 27–13 in the Pinstripe Bowl.

After the 2011 season, Schiano left Rutgers less than a week before National Signing Day to become the head coach of the NFL's Tampa Bay Buccaneers. Schiano left Rutgers with a 68–67 overall record. Schiano also finished 5–1 overall in the post season in eleven years as head coach. He left Rutgers ranked second on the all-time wins list.

=== Kyle Flood era (2012–2015) ===
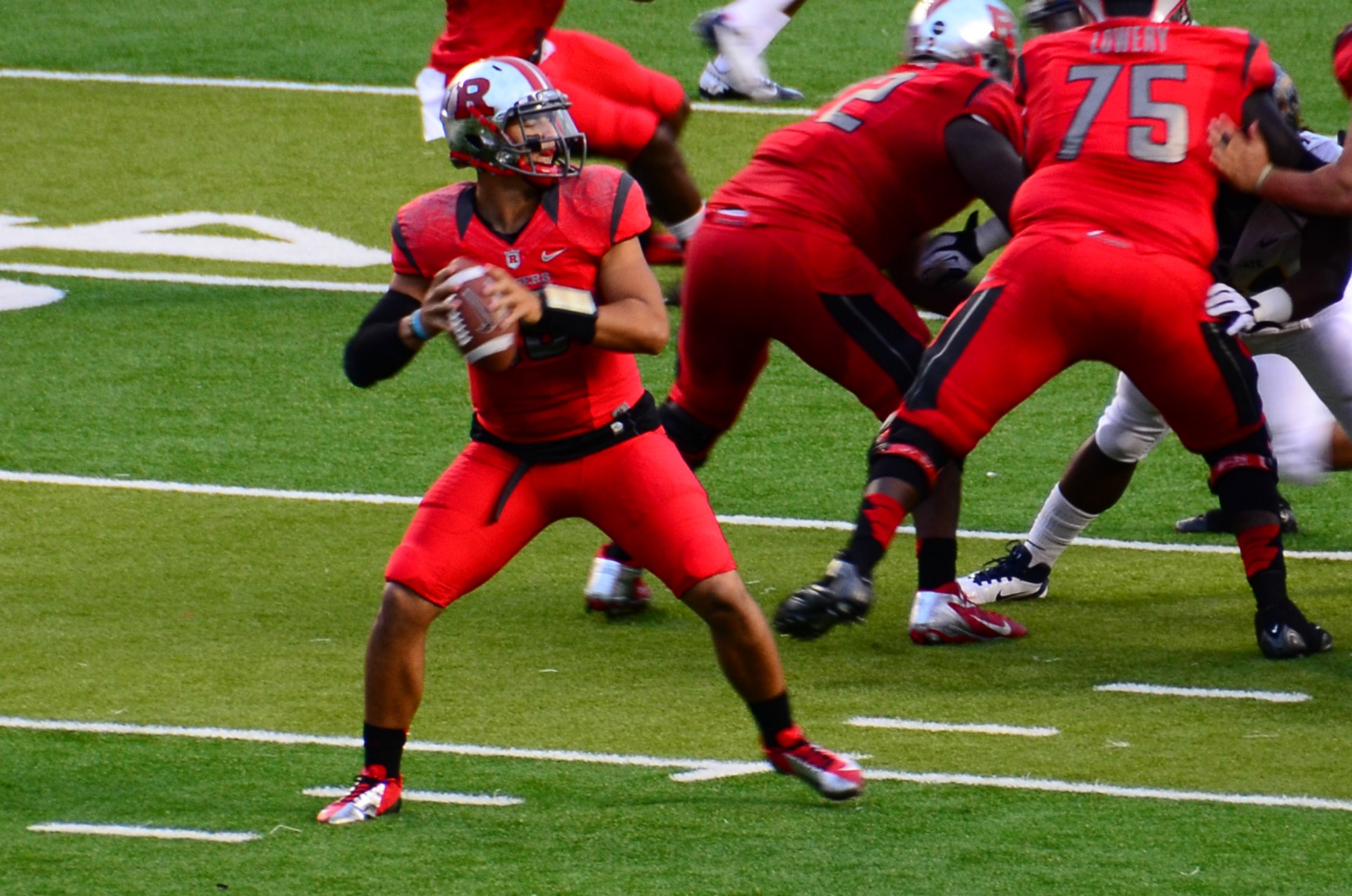
Rutgers playing in 2012

Kyle Flood was promoted from offensive line coach and took over as head coach after Schiano's departure. He was the 29th head coach in Rutgers football history. In 2012, Rutgers began the season 7–0, including a 35–26 defeat of Arkansas on the road in Fayetteville. The team reached a No. 15 ranking in both the BCS and AP Polls, before a surprise homecoming loss to Kent State by a score of 35–23. Rutgers would go on to finish the regular season 9–3, including a heartbreaking 20–17 loss to Louisville in the last game of the season, in which the winner would clinch the conference's BCS Bowl berth. Rutgers suffered yet another bowl loss in the Russell Athletic Bowl, dropping an overtime decision to former Big East foe Virginia Tech by a score of 13–10. In November 2012, Rutgers was announced as a formal expansion acquisition of the Big Ten Conference, alongside rival Maryland of the ACC. Both Maryland and Rutgers were unanimously accepted to join the conference in all sports, effective July 1, 2014. Before this, however, Rutgers competed for one season in the American Athletic Conference, with the remaining teams of the Big East Conference.

Despite high expectations, Rutgers had an underwhelming 2013 season in the AAC, finishing 6–7 after losing the New Era Pinstripe Bowl to Notre Dame by a score of 29–16. 2014 marked Rutgers football's first official season of Big Ten play, with conference home games against Penn State, Michigan, Wisconsin, and Indiana, as well as road games against Ohio State, Nebraska, Michigan State, and Maryland. Rutgers finished the 2014 season in the Big Ten with a conference record of 3–5, including its first Big Ten Conference win over conference member Michigan, and an overall record of 7–5. Rutgers became bowl-eligible with that record and earned an invitation to play on December 26, 2014, in the 2014 Quick Lane Bowl, where it trounced North Carolina 40–21 and capped off its inaugural Big Ten season at 8–5. After the 2014 season, the Scarlet Knights were awarded their first Lambert-Meadowlands Trophy, being recognized as the top team in the eastern region. Looking to back up its strong showing in 2014 with another successful campaign in the Big Ten, the Scarlet Knights struggled in 2015, beleaguered before the onset of the season by the arrest of multiple active players on assault-related charges. During the season, the Scarlet Knights failed to gain traction, finishing 4–8 with a 1–7 Big Ten Record. Amid the disappointment of a poor season and off-the field issues, both head coach Kyle Flood and athletic director Julie Hermann were both fired on November 29, 2015.

=== Chris Ash era (2016–2019) ===
On December 7, 2015, Rutgers officially announced Ohio State defensive coordinator Chris Ash as the Scarlet Knights' new head football coach, becoming the 30th head coach in program history. Rutgers posted a 2–10 record in Ash's first season, in the 2016 campaign. In 2017, Rutgers started their first 4 games with only 1 win against Morgan State by the score of 65–0. They won their second game of the season in Illinois, for their first Big Ten win in 2 years. Rutgers finished 4–8 overall in Chris Ash second season as head coach. In 2018, Rutgers had a disappointing season, finishing 1–11 in Chris Ash third season as head coach. Rutgers won their home season opener against Texas State 35–7. Rutgers finished last in Big Ten play. Chris Ash, entering his fourth season as head coach, started the 2019 Rutgers football season with a win over the UMass Minutemen 48–21. On September 29, 2019, a day after a 52–0 loss to Michigan, Ash was fired as the Rutgers football head coach. Assistant Nunzio Campanile would replace him as interim head coach. Chris Ash had a dismal record in the four seasons he was with the Scarlet Knights, he finished 8–32 overall.

=== Greg Schiano's return (2020–present) ===
Rutgers playing Michigan in 2021

On December 1, 2019, Rutgers and Greg Schiano agreed to an 8-year, $32 million contract that would see him return as the head coach of the Scarlet Knights. The 2020 season presented unforeseen challenges dealing with the coronavirus pandemic. Playing a Big Ten-only schedule, the Scarlet Knights were one of just two teams in the conference to play all nine of its scheduled games. Rutgers, despite missing spring and summer camp, matched the program high with three Big Ten victories, all away to equal the number of league road wins the previous six seasons combined. Rutgers finished the 2020 season 3–6 overall. The program also achieved academic success with 46 student-athletes recognized on the Fall Academic All-Big Ten list, the most for the Scarlet Knights since joining the conference. The team posted its highest GPA ever as a program during the spring 2020 semester. In 2021 Schiano's second season back as head coach and playing a full schedule, Rutgers went 5–7 overall. It was an improvement but also disappointing given that expectations were for bowl eligibility. However On December 23, the NCAA football oversight committee approved Rutgers as the first bowl alternate, under rules whereby five-win teams are ranked by Academic Progress Rate (APR) calculations. Rutgers finished first in APR among the five-win schools and was given the option to accept the bid. Rutgers accepted the bowl bid to play in the TaxSlayer Gator Bowl to play against Wake Forest with only a week of preparation for the game, Rutgers would go on to lose by a score of 38–10.

In 2022, Rutgers won their first three games of the season, then would go on to win only one game the rest of the season, winning against the Indiana Hoosiers for their only conference win, finishing the season with a disappointing 4–8 overall record. However, despite the team's losing record, it was a milestone year for head coach Greg Schiano becoming the all-time winningest coach in the programs history with 79 career wins, passing legendary coach Frank Burns 78 career wins.

Scarlet Knights players taking the field before a game in 2023

In 2023 Rutgers won seven games to secure its first winning season since 2014. The Scarlet Knights picked up three Big Ten wins to match the program high previously set in 2014, 2017 and 2020. Rutgers strength of schedule was ranked second nationally heading into bowl season and finished number four and highest among Big Ten teams according to the ESPN College Football Power Index. Eight opponents from the regular season appeared in bowl games. Rutgers solid defense and running back Kyle Monangai who rushed for 1,262 yards with 8 touchdowns led the Scarlet Knights to the postseason where Rutgers defeated the Miami Hurricanes in the Pinstripe Bowl by a score of 31–24 in which Monangai rushed for 163 yards and 1 rushing touchdown and was the MVP of the game.

The Rutgers Scarlet Knights under Schiano in 2024 finished 7–6 overall, including a tough disappointing loss in the post season bowl game to Kansas State in the Rate Bowl by a score of 44–41 in a barnburner to conclude the 2024 campaign.

On November 21 2026, Rutgers won its first game against Penn State in 38 years.

== Conference affiliations ==
- Middle States Intercollegiate Football League (1893–1894)
- Middle Three Conference (1946–1951)
- Middle Atlantic Conference (University Division) (1958–1961)
- Big East Conference (1991–2012)
- American Athletic Conference (2013)
- Big Ten Conference (2014–present)

== Championships ==
=== National championships ===
Rutgers claims one national championship.

Season	Coach	Selector	Record
1869	No coach	Parke H. Davis	1–1

=== Conference championships ===
Rutgers has one conference championship.

Season	Conference	Coach	Overall Record	Conference Record
2012†	Big East Conference	Kyle Flood	9–4	5–2

† Co-champions

=== Division championships ===
Three University Division titles as a member of the Middle Atlantic Conference (MAC).

Season	Conference	Coach	Overall Record	Conference Record
1958	Middle Atlantic Conference	John Stiegman	8–1	4–0
1960	Middle Atlantic Conference	John F. Bateman	8–1	4–0
1961	Middle Atlantic Conference	John F. Bateman	9–0	4–0

== Bowl games ==
Rutgers has played in 13 bowl games, with a postseason record of 7–6.

Season	Coach	Bowl	Opponent	Result
1978	Frank R. Burns	Garden State Bowl	Arizona State	L 18–34
2005	Greg Schiano	Insight Bowl	Arizona State	L 40–45
2006	Greg Schiano	Texas Bowl	Kansas State	W 37–10
2007	Greg Schiano	International Bowl	Ball State	W 52–30
2008	Greg Schiano	PapaJohns.com Bowl	North Carolina State	W 29–23
2009	Greg Schiano	St. Petersburg Bowl	Central Florida	W 45–24
2011	Greg Schiano	Pinstripe Bowl	Iowa State	W 27–13
2012	Kyle Flood	Russell Athletic Bowl	Virginia Tech	L 10–13^{OT}
2013	Kyle Flood	Pinstripe Bowl	Notre Dame	L 16–29
2014	Kyle Flood	Quick Lane Bowl	North Carolina	W 40–21
2021	Greg Schiano	Gator Bowl	Wake Forest	L 10–38
2023	Greg Schiano	Pinstripe Bowl	Miami (FL)	W 31–24
2024	Greg Schiano	Rate Bowl	Kansas State	L 41–44

== Head coaches ==
There have been 29 head coaches of the Rutgers football team, 4 of whom have served in multiple tenures. Greg Schiano is currently the head coach.

No.	Coach	Tenure	Record	Pct.
1, 4	John C. B. Pendleton	1891, 1896–1897	8–12	.400
2	William A. Reynolds	1895	0–2	.000
3	H. W. Ambruster	1895	3–2	.600
5	William V. B. Van Dyck	1898–1899	3–15–1	.184
6	Michael F. Daly	1900	4–4	.500
7	Arthur P. Robinson	1901	0–7	.000
8	Henry Van Hoevenberg	1902	3–7	.300
9, 11	Oliver D. Mann	1903, 1905	7–10–1	.417
10	Alfred Ellet Hitchner	1904	1–6–2	.222
12	Frank Gorton	1906–1907	8–7–3	.528
13	Joseph T. Smith	1908	3–5–1	.389
14	Herman Pritchard	1909	3–5–1	.389
15	Howard Gargan	1910–1912	12–10–4	.538
16	George Sanford	1913–1923	56–32–5	.629
17	John H. Wallace	1924–1926	12–14–1	.463
18, 21	Harry Rockafeller	1927–1930, 1942–1945	33–26–1	.558
19	J. Wilder Tasker	1931–1937	31–27–5	.532
20, 22	Harvey Harman	1938–1941, 1946–1955	74–44–2	.625
23	John Stiegman	1956–1959	22–15	.595
24	John F. Bateman	1960–1972	73–51	.589
25	Frank R. Burns	1973–1983	78–43–1	.643
26	Dick Anderson	1984–1989	27–34–4	.446
27	Doug Graber	1990–1995	29–36–1	.447
28	Terry Shea	1996–2000	11–44	.200
29, 34	Greg Schiano	2001–2011, 2020–	100–111	.474
30	Kyle Flood	2012–2015	26–22	.542
31	Norries Wilson†	2015	1–2	.333
32	Chris Ash	2016–2019	8–32	.200
33	Nunzio Campanile†	2019	1–7	.125

† Interim

== Logos and uniforms ==
Big Ten logo in Rutgers colors

Traditional uniforms have featured red jerseys, white pants, and red helmets but the particular style has changed many times over the years. The helmets, in particular, have featured a wide range of logos. The Block R logo has seen various forms over the years but what fans now consider the "traditional" team logo debuted in 2001. Between 2012 and 2016, the uniform featured a distinctive chrome helmet with a rotation of red, black, and white jerseys that are based on the team's knight mascot. Rutgers returned to more of their traditional uniform (red jerseys, white pants, and red helmets) in 2016.

Black jerseys had been rarely used by the team until 2011. Since 2011, Rutgers has traditionally held a blackout game each year where they wear full black uniforms. The current ones have red numbers with white outline.

In 2019, Rutgers sent a cease-and-desist letter about the Block R logo to Ruston High School in Ruston, Louisiana. The controversy was reported by national media outlets.

In September 2022, Rutgers unveiled new, white uniforms with red trim and matching white helmets at the season opener against Boston College.

== Rivalries ==
=== Princeton ===
The Princeton and Rutgers rivalry is a college rivalry in athletics between the Tigers of Princeton University, and Rutgers both of which are located in New Jersey. The rivalry dates back to the first college football game in history in 1869, and even events prior to the first football game, having played against each other in other sports, prior to the first football game, along with engaging in the Rutgers–Princeton Cannon War. Although the football series ended between Rutgers and Princeton in 1980 due to the two schools going in different directions with their football programs, the rivalry has continued in other sports, primarily in men's basketball.

=== Maryland ===
Before both Maryland and Rutgers joined the Big Ten, the two schools played each other in nonconference play nine times between 1920 and 2009, with Maryland holding a 5-4 record. When both schools joined the Big Ten in 2014, they were placed in the Big Ten's newly formed East Division.

In seven of the 10 years in the Big Ten East era (2014–23), Rutgers and Maryland played each other the final week of the season. Through 2025, Maryland leads the rivalry 12-9, with a 7-5 record in the Big Ten, while Rutgers has won the previous two match ups. In 2016, Rutgers Athletic Director Patrick E. Hobbs and then-coach Chris Ash told reporters the schools had "initial conversations with Maryland" to create a trophy, but no trophy has been created to date.

The expanded 18-member Big Ten eliminated the divisional format in 2024 and introduced the Flex Protect XVIII model. The conference designated Maryland-Rutgers as one of 12 protected annual matchups through at least the 2028 season.

== Other rivals ==
=== Syracuse ===
The Syracuse-Rutgers football rivalry, primarily fueled by their years as Big East conference opponents, is a historic matchup marked by Syracuse's early dominance (12-game win streak 1987-98) followed by Rutgers' resurgence under Greg Schiano, who turned the tide in the 2000s, creating competitive bragging rights that resurfaced when they briefly met again in 2021 after a nine-year hiatus. The rivalry featured memorable games that contributed to the history of both programs, highlighting the significance of regional pride and competitive spirit in college football. In 2012, Syracuse accepted an invitation to leave the Big East for the Atlantic Coast Conference (ACC) subsequently ending the rivalry in 2013.

=== Temple ===
The Temple-Rutgers football rivalry, sometimes called the "Battle of the Brick", is a regional contest marked by proximity and history, intensified by conference shifts like the Big East era, with recent matchups often close, featuring Rutgers winning key recent games, but Temple having had success previously, making it a competitive, sometimes bitter, matchup for bragging rights in the Northeast. Rutgers leads the series against Temple 24–15. The series is set to resume in 2030

== Traditions ==
=== The "Scarlet Walk" ===
Before every home football game, the team travels down the "Scarlet Walk" greeting fans and the players touch the "First Game" statue commemorating the first ever college football game played in 1869.

=== The Cannon ===
A cannon is fired after a Rutgers touchdown and at the end of a game with a Rutgers win.

=== The call-and-response ===
A chant where one side of the stadium yells "R" and the other side responds with "U".

== Recognized players ==
Rutgers has had many key contributing players in its 156-year history of college football. Dating back to the 1910s, the university has had several All-American candidates as well as a couple of once potential Heisman Trophy candidates in its history.

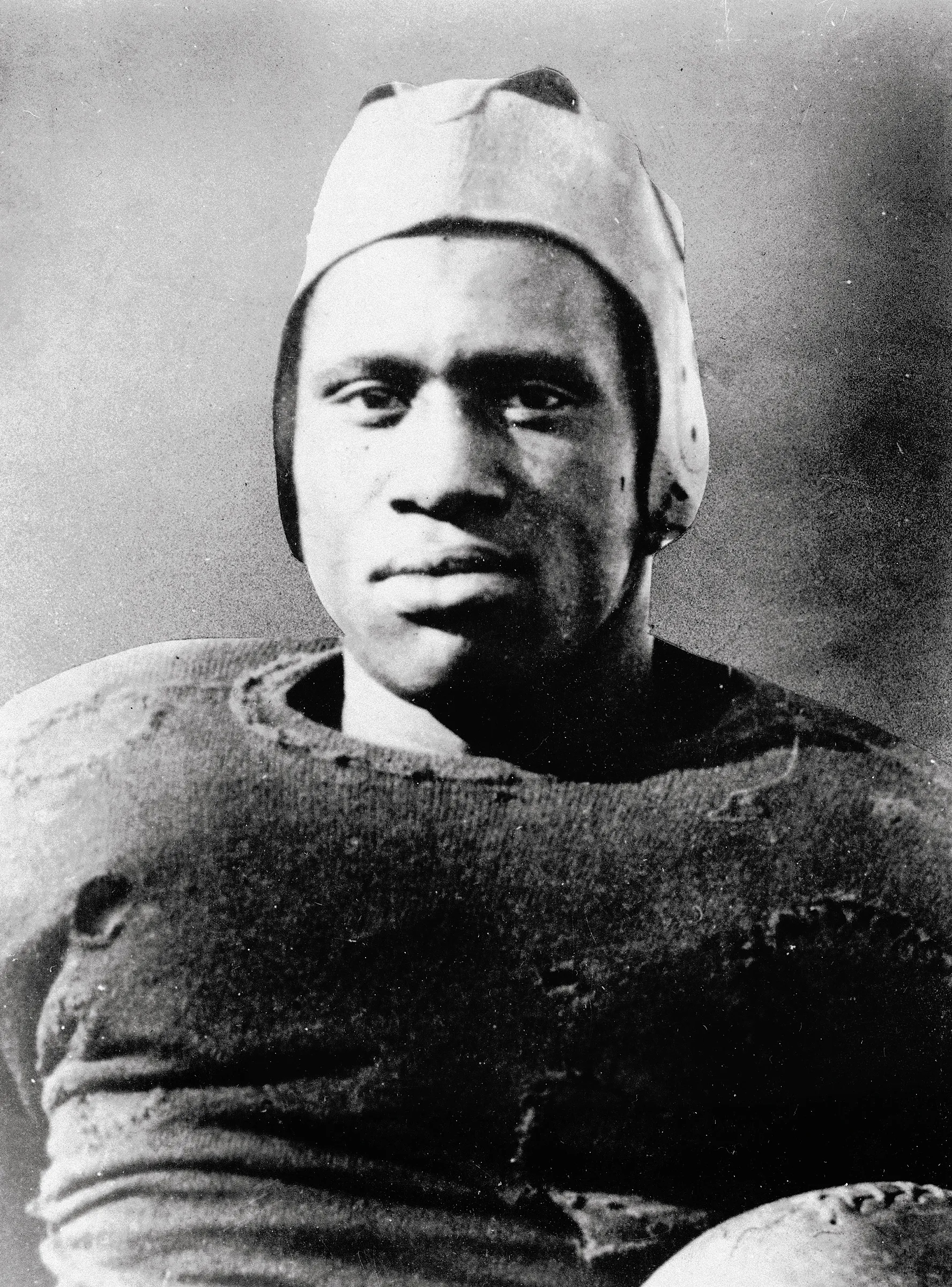
Paul Robeson in 1919

1910s Paul Robeson, born in Princeton, NJ played under future College Football Hall of Fame coach George Sanford. In his junior and senior years, playing as an end, Robeson was selected as an All-American in 1917 and 1918. After college, he played three years in the early NFL, first with the Akron Pros in 1921 and then the Milwaukee Badgers in 1922. Robeson was inducted into the College Football Hall of Fame as a player in 1995.

1920s Homer Hazel first played for Rutgers in 1915, and then from 1923 to 1924. He was twice named an All-American, as an end in 1923 and a fullback in 1924. Hazel was elected to the College Football Hall of Fame as a player in 1951.

1950s Bill Austin, a native of Fanwood, NJ was one of the first recognized players from Rutgers. Gifted with a twisting and elusive running style, Austin led the Scarlet Knights in rushing three straight seasons. Despite being undersized at 5'11 and 170 lbs, he rushed for 2,073 yards while ranking up 204 points in his career with Rutgers. His 32-touchdown career ranks second in the Rutgers annals among all-time scorers and he also had a total of 13 interceptions from his defensive back position, which is one short of all-time mark.

Austin was inducted into the Rutgers Football Hall of Fame in 1988 and was recognized as an AP All-American in 1958. That year, Austin led the team to an 8–1 record, though the team could've gone 9-0 if Austin did not sit out the Quantico Marines game with an apparent hand injury. Austin was also considered a potential Heisman Trophy candidate, though the award was won by Pete Dawkins of Army that year. Austin went on to play for the Washington Redskins after being drafted in 1959.

1960s By the 1960s, Alex Kroll came onto the scene as a formidable opponent. At 6'2 228 lbs playing center, Kroll played and was enrolled at Yale for two seasons before serving in the Army. He later formed a bond with the football captains at Rutgers before deciding to transfer there. Kroll was extremely physical in the trenches, giving way to his spot as the captain of the team in 1961. In his senior year biography, "his performance and leadership in 1960 helped Rutgers to a season which surpassed even the most optimistic of the previews. He has size, speed, hustle, and an uncanny ability to call defenses best equipped to stop the enemy." Kroll was an excellent student in the classroom, played linebacker at times, and helped lead Rutgers to a 17–1 record in his time at Rutgers, earning him AP All-American center award in the undefeated season of 1961.

1970s The 1970s featured several great players for the Scarlet Knights. From 1971 to 1973, running back JJ Jennings tore up the record books, ranking him third all time at Rutgers with 2,935 yards rushing. He also led the nation in scoring during the 1973 season, with Honorable Mention on the list of the AP All-American team.

In the late 1970s, Rutgers football, led by coach Frank R. Burns, showed the nation its capabilities with an undefeated record in 1976 (11–0). That year included Rutgers star defensive tackle, Nate Toran, who finished his career with 52 sacks including 17 in 1976. Toran earned third team AP All-American that year, joined by honorable mentions John Alexander, Jim Hughes, Henry Jenkins, and Mark Twitty.

1980s An array of different players from the 1980s led Rutgers to match-ups against teams such as Penn State, Michigan State, Alabama, and more. During that time, Deron Cherry, a standout safety for Rutgers, was an honorable AP All-American in 1980, followed by his teammate Ed McMichael.

Other standouts included Jim Dumont and Tyronne Stowe, who holds the all-time record of 533 tackles. In the late 1980s, Scott Erney was an Honorable AP All-American mention, leading the team to key victories in 1988 over Michigan State and Penn State. Wide receiver Eric Young, who later went on to play baseball in the MLB, He was also another Honorable AP All-American mention.

1990s The early 1990s brought in a great recruiting class for Rutgers football, featuring running backs Bruce Presley and Terrell Willis. Together they were known as "Thunder and Lightning," they racked up 5,889 yards combined earning Presley with second team Freshman All-American honors in 1992, and Willis with first team Freshman All-American honors in 1993.

In 1994, tight end Marco Battaglia came onto the scene as a force. In his career "on the banks," Marco went from 27 catches, to 58, to 69 catches in 1995. With great size at 6'3", 245 lbs, he was drafted in the second round of the 1996 NFL draft.

Rutgers quarterback Mike McMahon played from 1997 to 2000, left as the all-time passing leader in Rutgers history with a total of 6,608 yards passing.

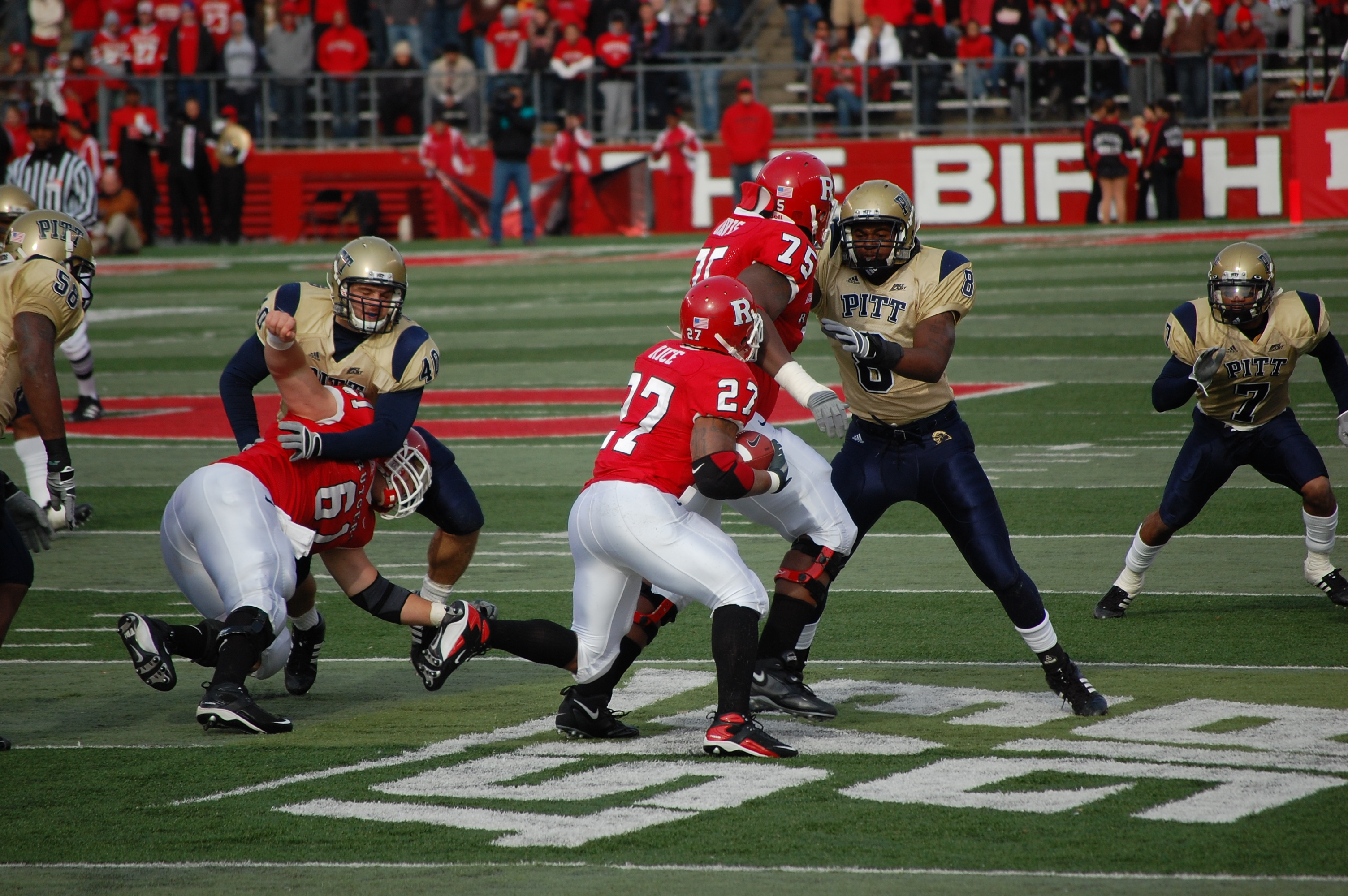
Running back Ray Rice in 2008

2000s Running back Ray Rice is a player who has stood out as a major icon in Rutgers Football. Recruited out of New Rochelle HS in New York, Rice beat out four other running backs his freshman year to earn a starting spot in 2005. He racked up 1,120 yards that season. In 2006, Rice finished second in the nation in rushing and was a finalist for the Maxwell Award, given to the best player in the country. By 2007, Rutgers University had set up a Heisman campaign for Rice. By the end of his career, Ray amassed 4,926 yards on the ground with 49 career rushing touchdowns and leads the Rutgers record book in almost every major rushing category. He was second team AP All-American two years in a row in 2006 and 2007.

Wide receiver Kenny Britt and defensive back Devin McCourty were both also Honorable Mentions on the AP All-American team.

Fullback Brian Leonard recruited out of Gouverneur New York HS, Leonard finished his Rutgers' career ranked fourth all-time in rushing yards with 2,775, fourth all-time in rushing touchdowns with 32, sixth all-time in receiving yards with 1,864, first all-time in receptions with 207, and tied for fourth all-time in receiving touchdowns with 13, second all-time in all-purpose yards with 4,639, and first all-time in total combined touchdowns with 45, and first all-time in career points scored with 272 total. Leonard played for the Scarlet Knights from 2003 to 2006.

2010s Defensive back Logan Ryan played for Rutgers from 2010 to 2012. He was a first team All-Big East.

Quarterback Gary Nova recruited out of Don Bosco Prep HS in New Jersey, he played for Rutgers from 2011 to 2014. Nova holds several passing records at Rutgers, with 73 career touchdown passes, making him number one in that category in the programs history. He is also number two in passing yards with 9,258 placing him second behind Mike Teel who passed for 9,383 yards. Nova is also number one in pass attempts and number two in completions in his career at Rutgers. Nova was the team's MVP in the 2014 season.

Running back Isiah Pacheco recruited out of Vineland South HS in New Jersey, Pacheco finished his career ranked sixth in the Rutgers record books with 563 carries and seventh with 2,442 rushing yards with an overall total of 19 touchdowns. He also finished 11th in program history with 3,039 all-purpose yards.

Punter Adam Korsak out of Melbourne Australia was a special teams weapon for Scarlet Knights. During his career at Rutgers, Korsak set many records. He is the NCAA all-time leader in punting yards with 15,318 and in attempts with 349 and also net punting yards in a season of (45.25 in 2021). He never had a punt blocked in his career at Rutgers. The greatest punter in Rutgers history was recognized as the best in the nation and was named the winner of the 2022 Ray Guy Award. It also marked a historic career for the most prolific punter in FBS history.

2020s Running back Kyle Monangai recruited out of Don Bosco prep HS in New Jersey, was a huge part of Rutgers rebuild under Schiano. Monangai was the first running back to have a 1,000 yard season since Jawan Jamison did in 2012. Kyle rushed for 3,222 yards in his career at Rutgers placing him second in program history. He also had a total of 28 career touchdowns as a Scarlet Knight. He also had zero fumbles in 669 career carries. Monangai earned First Team All-Big Ten honors his senior season in 2024.

=== Retired numbers ===
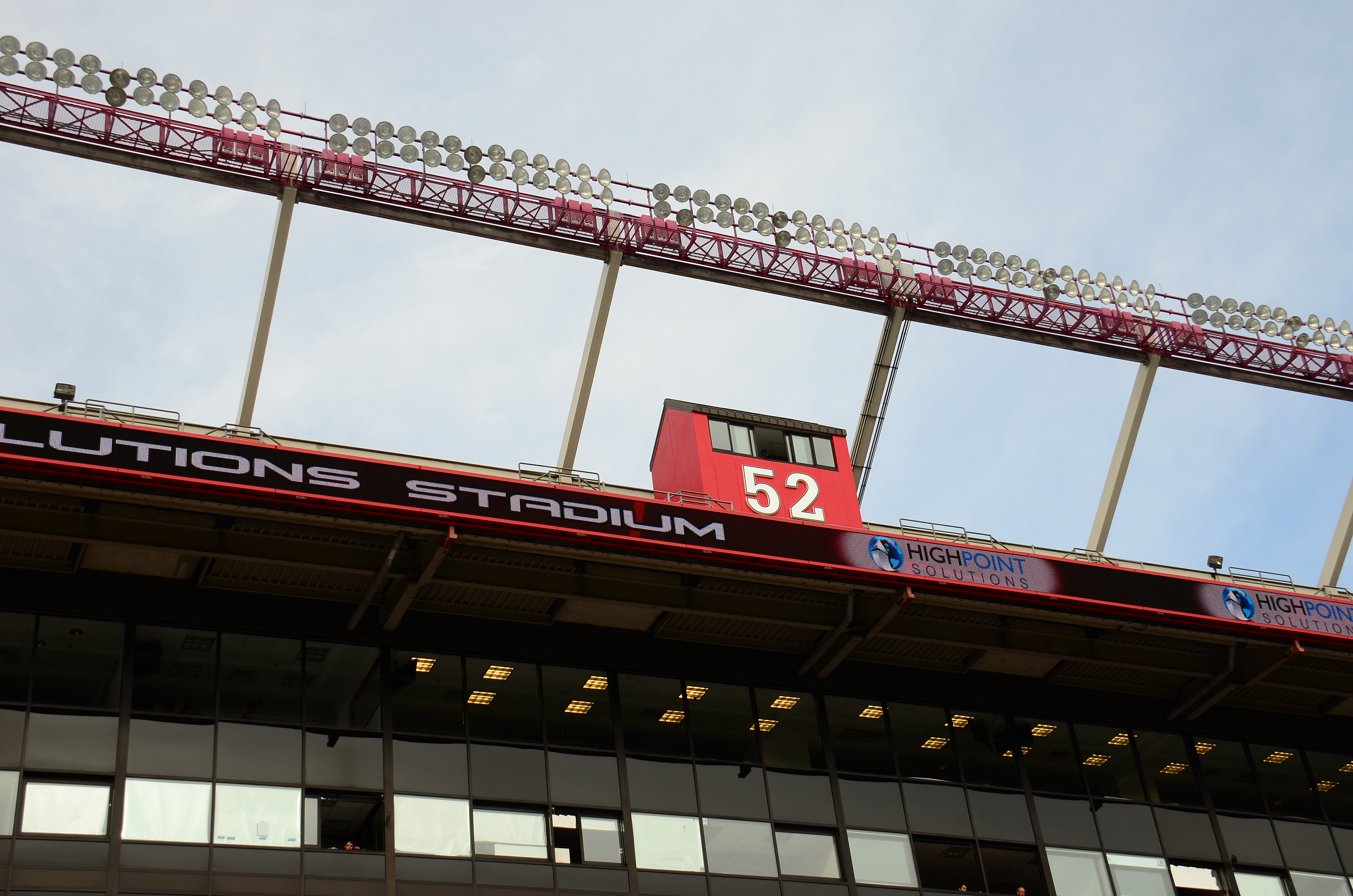
Eric Legrand's number, #52 displayed at SHI Stadium

Rutgers Scarlet Knights retired numbers
No.	Player	Pos.	Tenure	No. ret.	Ref.
52	Eric LeGrand (Note: LeGrand was injured in a game against Army in 2010 while making a tackle. As a result, he became paralyzed. On July 30, 2013, Rutgers announced it would retire LeGrand's #52 jersey. It was the first number retired by the football program.)	DT	2008–2010	2013	

== Scarlet Knights in the NFL ==
The Scarlet Knights have had 3 players drafted in the first round of the NFL Draft. In 2010, Anthony Davis was selected 11th overall by the San Francisco 49ers, Devin McCourty was chosen No. 27 overall by the New England Patriots and in 2009, Kenny Britt was chosen No. 30 overall by the Tennessee Titans. An Associated Press All-America selection, Britt became the first player in Rutgers history to be selected in the first round of the NFL Draft. 2010 also marked the fourth consecutive year that a Scarlet Knights player been taken on the draft's first day after Brian Leonard (2007) and Ray Rice (2008) were both second-round draft selections. In the 2024 NFL draft the Arizona Cardinals drafted Max Melton, he was selected No. 43 overall in the second-round, Isiah Pacheco was drafted No. 251 overall in the seventh round of the 2022 NFL draft by the Kansas City Chiefs. The Chicago Bears selected Kyle Monangai No. 233 overall in the seventh round of the 2024 NFL draft, further bolstering Rutgers presence in the NFL.

=== Current NFL players who played for Rutgers ===
As of October 16, 2026, there are a total of 12 Scarlet Knights listed on NFL team rosters.

- Shawn Bowman – TE – Arizona Cardinals
- Max Melton – CB – Arizona Cardinals
- Robert Longerbeam – CB – Atlanta Falcons
- Kyle Monangai – RB – Chicago Bears
- Michael Burton – FB – Cleveland Browns
- Christian Izien – S – Detroit Lions
- Eric O'Neill – DE – Detroit Lions
- Isiah Pacheco – RB – Detroit Lions
- Bo Melton – WR – Green Bay Packers
- Andrew DePaola – LS – Minnesota Vikings
- Sebastian Joseph-Day – DT – Pittsburgh Steelers
- Athan Kaliakmanis – QB – Washington Commanders

== Local media coverage ==
Rutgers has a contract with SportsNet New York to air various football-related programming during the season. Previous to its Big Ten membership (where its media rights are mainly a part of the Big Ten Network), this included games produced by ESPN Plus.

Football games air on the Rutgers Football Radio Network, the flagship of which as of 2022 is WFAN-AM/FM in New York.

As of 2023, the Rutgers football broadcast team is led by Chris Carlin as play-by-play. Former Rutgers quarterback Mike Teel is the analyst for games played at home, while the team's road games feature former defensive end Julian Pinnix-Odrick as analyst. Anthony Fucilli serves as the sideline reporter for all games, with Marc Malusis hosting all studio segments with Eric LeGrand as his co-host analyst.

Inside Rutgers Football is the coach's show of Rutgers University's football team. The show, which debuted at the start of the 2001 season, is hosted by WNBC's Bruce Beck and features the Scarlet Knights' head football coach.

== Future non-conference opponents ==
Announced schedules as of August 21, 2026.

2026	2027	2028	2029	2030	2031	2032	2033
UMass	Akron	Norfolk State (FCS)	Central Michigan	at Temple	Temple	at Temple	Temple
at Boston College	Boston College	Kent State	UConn	Kent State	Akron		
Howard (FCS)	LIU (FCS)	at UConn					

== See also ==
- Rutgers Day, and the Scarlet-White game
- The First Game
- American football in the United States
