= 1869 Rutgers Queensmen football team =

American college football season

1869 Rutgers Queensmen football

Co-national champion (Davis)
- Conference: Independent
- Record: 1–1
- Head coach: None
- Captain: William J. Leggett

1869 college football records
	Conf.			Overall
Team	W	L	T	W		L		T
Princeton		–		1	–	1	–	0
Rutgers		–		1	–	1	–	0

The 1869 Rutgers Queensmen football team represented Rutgers University in the 1869 college football season. The team finished with a 1–1 record and was retroactively named the co-national champion by Parke H. Davis. They played Princeton two times, splitting the series one game each. The team had no coach, and was captained by William J. Leggett.

== Schedule ==
Date	Time	Opponent	Site	Result	Source
November 6	3:00 p.m.	Princeton	College Field; New Brunswick, NJ (rivalry)	W 6–4	
November 13		at Princeton	Princeton, NJ	L 0–8	

== Roster ==
The Rutgers roster consisted of:

Class of 1870

- D.D. Williamson, BSc., Later architect

Class of 1871

- Ezra Doane DeLamater, Lawyer.
- Stephen George Gano, BSc, Civil engineer.
- William James Hill, Left Rutgers 1870 for New Brunswick Seminary; later clergyman.
- WS Lasher, BSc., Engineer.
- George Edgar Pace, Lawyer.
- CL Pruyn, BSc., Manufacturer.
- John Henry Wyckoff, Clergyman and professor of theology.

Class of 1872

- Thomas Wallace Clemens, Lawyer.
- Edward D. Gillmore, Lawyer.
- John Warne Herbert Jr., BSc., Lawyer.
- George Hall Large, Lawyer.
- William James Leggett, Lawyer.
- Charles Henry Steele, Physician.
- George Henry Stevens, Lawyer.
- John Alfred Van Neste, Clergyman.

Class of 1873

- Frederick Ernest Allen, Clergyman.
- Madison Monroe Ball, Teacher.
- George Riley Dixon, Lawyer and superintendent of schools.
- Daniel Trimble Hawxhurst, Bookkeeper.
- Peter V. Huyssoon, Manager, teachers’ agency.
- William Henry McKee, Clergyman.
- Abram Irving Martine, Clergyman.
- Claudius Rockefeller, Lawyer, Captain of the 1872 Rutgers football team.
- Jacob Outcalt Van Fleet, Clergyman.
- George Sidney Willits, Transferred to US Naval Academy; later Rear Admiral.
- Charles Seymour Wright, Clergyman.

== See also ==
- List of historically significant college football games
- List of the first college football games in each U.S. state
