= 1869 Princeton vs. Rutgers football game =

First collegiate football match in the US

- First college football game
Princeton Tigers	Rutgers Queensmen
(0–0)	(0–0)
4	6
	1	Total
Princeton	4	4
Rutgers	6	6
- Date: November 6, 1869
- Season: 1869
- Location: New Brunswick, New Jersey
- Attendance: 100

The first American football game was played between teams from Rutgers College, now Rutgers University, and the College of New Jersey, now Princeton University, on November 6, 1869. The rules governing play were based on the London-based Football Association's 1863 rules that disallowed carrying or throwing the ball making it the first intercollegiate soccer game in the United States. Additionally, because gridiron football developed from the rules of association football and rugby football, many also consider it to be the first gridiron game and the first collegiate American football game. (Note: The Scottish Varsity match in rugby football was first played in the 1860s while intercollegiate matches in association football involving the University of Oxford and University of Cambridge in England date back earlier.) Rutgers won the game 6–4.

== Origin of the game ==
The events leading up to the first college football game were described by John Warne Herbert Jr., in 1933. Herbert was one of the players on the Rutgers team in the inaugural college football match and the youngest player in the game.

Rutgers and Princeton had a rivalry going for many years prior to their collegiate football match. For many years, Rutgers and Princeton engaged in a friendly war over a Revolutionary War cannon, known as the Rutgers–Princeton Cannon War. Rutgers and Princeton students had gone back and forth between the colleges many times, which are just 20 miles apart.

When Princeton last stole the cannon from Rutgers, then encased it on their campus in several feet of concrete, they left Rutgers without immediate recourse. Princeton then demolished Rutgers in an intercollegiate baseball game, winning 40 to 2, in 1866. Rutgers was looking for revenge and challenged Princeton to the football match.

Rutgers, through its elected captain, William J. Leggett, then sent a formal invitation to play a series of three games, the first being on the Rutgers campus. Princeton, which had been playing various forms of football internally since 1840, organized a team and chose William Stryker Gummere as its captain.

On November 6, 1869, the Princeton students arrived in New Brunswick at 10 a.m. and the students all entered the Rutgers field at 3 p.m. that afternoon. The two team captains established the rules of the game between each other and play began.

== Details ==
Marker commemorating the location of the game, played at Rutgers in New Brunswick

Part of the 1869–70 college soccer season and the first season of college football, the game took place on November 6, 1869, at a field on College Avenue (now the site of the College Avenue Gymnasium) in New Brunswick, New Jersey. Because the game was played at Rutgers, it was also played under Rutgers' rules. They were based on the English Football Association's 1863 rules, in which two teams of 25 players attempted to score by kicking the ball into the opposing team's goal. A 1932 painting of the match by Rutgers graduate William Boyd illustrates the soccer-style ball and goalposts. The teams played 10 "games" against each other. When a team scored a goal, it counted as the end of that game, and the team with the most goals after 10 games was the winner. It is clear that its format did not resemble the game of college football as known today. The first such game in the United States in which the ball is advanced by physically picking it up and running, where play is stopped by knocking down the ball carrier, and each team fields eleven members was played on June 4, 1875, between Tufts and Harvard colleges. and then Yale on November 13. That game caused Yale to drop association football in favor of rugby.

Princeton was represented by the Tigers and Rutgers by the Queensmen. William J. Leggett, later a distinguished clergyman of the Dutch Reformed Church, was the Rutgers captain; William Gummere, who later became chief justice of the Supreme Court of New Jersey, captained the New Jersey squad. The game was played in front of approximately 100 spectators. The players from Rutgers wore scarlet-colored turbans and handkerchiefs to distinguish themselves from the Princeton players. The scarlet of the Rutgers Scarlet Knights came from this episode.

=== Rules ===
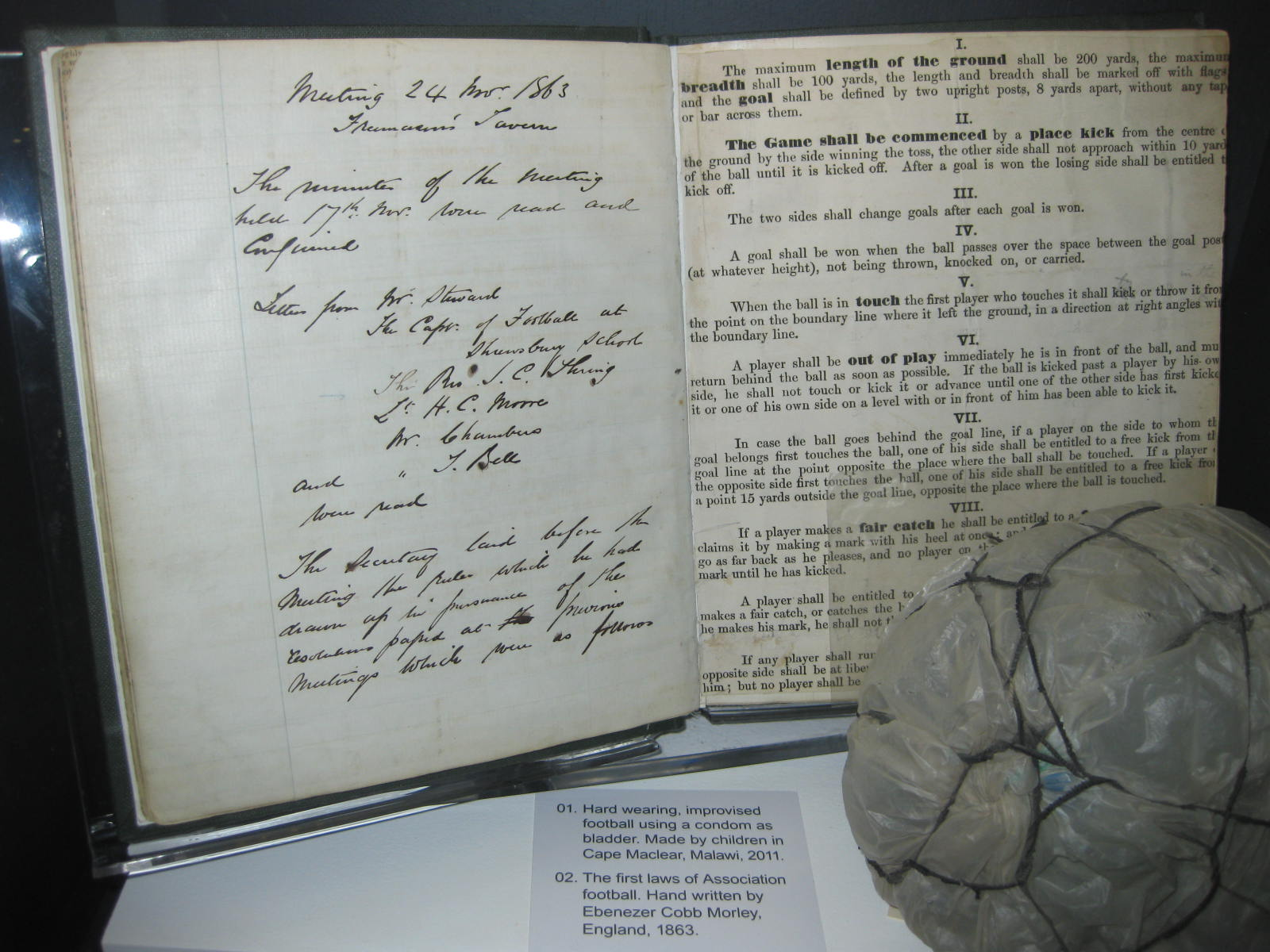
Rutgers' rules were based on the English Football Association's rules of the time. An early draft of the original hand-written 'Laws of the Game', drawn up in 1863, is on display at the National Football Museum, Manchester

The rules for this game –the first code for any form of football in the United States– were as follows:

1. Grounds must be 360 feet (110 m) long and 225 feet (69 m) wide.
2. Goals must be 8 paces.
3. Each side shall number 25 players.
4. No throwing or running with the ball; if either it is a foul and the ball then must be thrown perpendicularly in the air by the side causing the foul.
5. No holding the ball or free kicks allowed.
6. A ball passing beyond the limit on the side of the goal shall be kicked on from the boundary by the side who has that goal.
7. A ball passing the limit on the side of the field shall be kicked on horizontally to the boundary by the side which kicked it out.
8. No tripping or holding of players.
9. The winner of the first toss has the choice of position; the winner of the second toss has the first kick-off.
10. There shall be four judges and two referees.

== Gameplay ==
As the first of the 10 games began, two players from each of the teams positioned themselves near the opponent's goal. This was presumably because the participants were hoping to easily score when the ball reached their territory on the field of play. On each team, there were eleven so-called "fielders" who were assigned to defend their own territorial area. There were 12 participants on each team that they named "bulldogs" who were the ones playing in the other team's territory.

Rutgers was the first to score a goal, as Stephen G. Gano and George Riley Dixon successfully kicked the ball across the Princeton goal. At some point early in the contest, the "flying wedge" play was first used as the team with the ball formed a wall-like formation of players, allowing them to charge at the defenders. This flying wedge tactic was successful early on for Rutgers because of their size disadvantage over Princeton. However, Princeton countered the tactic when Jacob Edwin Michael, better known as "Big Mike", broke up the Rutgers' flying wedge during the fourth game. Princeton took advantage and tied the score at 2–2.

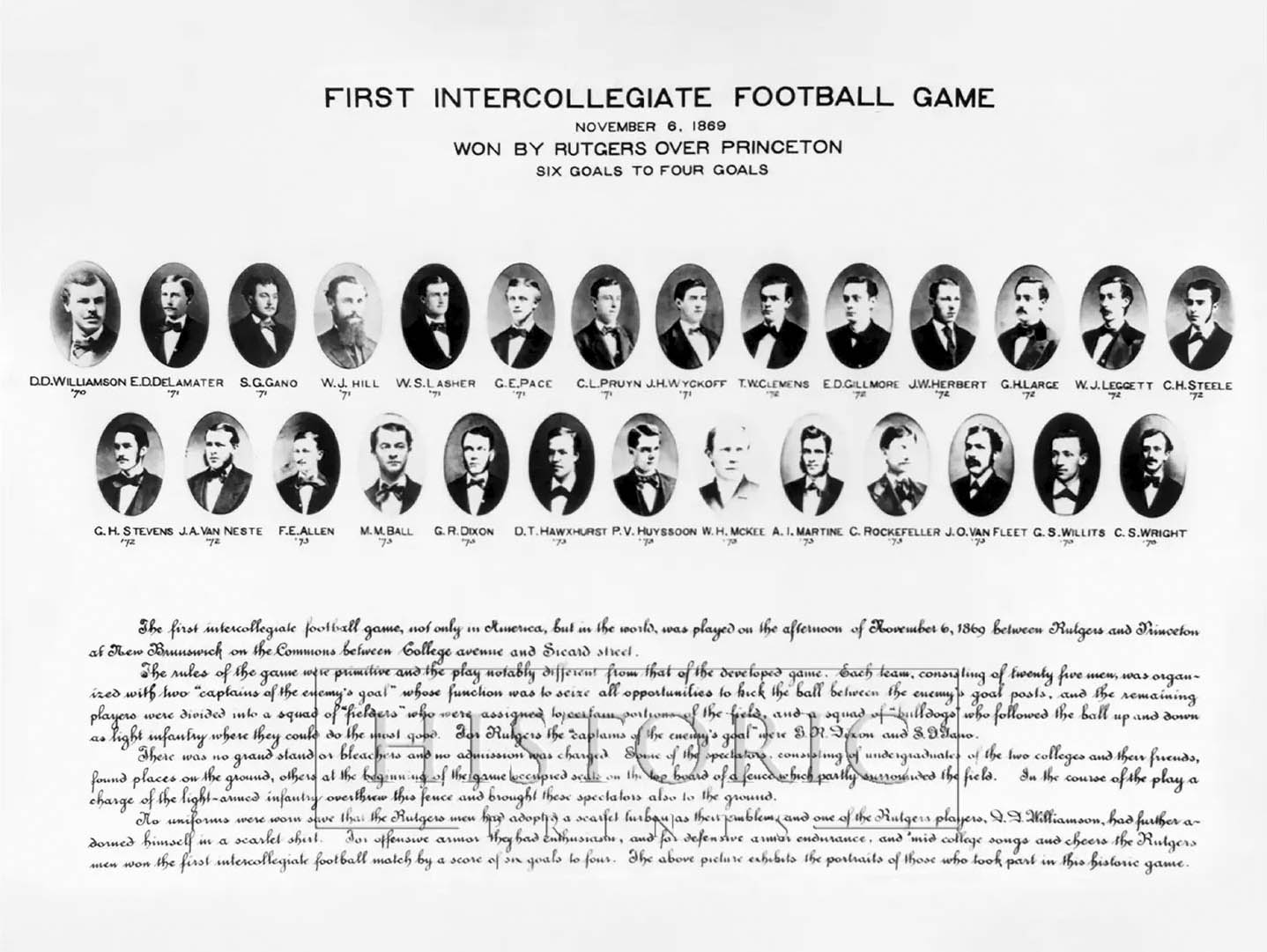
Rutgers roster for the game

A Rutgers player named Madison Monroe Ball, a wounded veteran of the American Civil War, used his quickness and kicking the ball with the heel of his foot to again take the lead in the contest. Whenever the ball entered Rutgers territory, Ball would get in front of it and use a heel-kick to prevent Princeton from scoring. Ball was able to successfully use that technique to set up Dixon to score another goal which gave Rutgers a 4–2 lead. Rutgers then allowed Princeton to score a goal as one of their players, whose identity is not known, had kicked a ball toward their own goal. It was blocked by a Rutgers player, but Princeton soon was able to take advantage to cut the lead down to 4–3. The Tigers scored on their next possession when they used a flying wedge play of their own led by Big Mike to march down the field to score to tie the game again at 4.

Rutgers captain William J. Leggett had a strategy for his team at this point. He suggested that the Rutgers team keep the ball low on the ground to counter the much taller players on Princeton. This strategy appeared to work as Rutgers easily scored the final two goals of the contest to win the first intercollegiate football game played 6 games to 4.

Princeton had more size, which would normally be an advantage on a field with 50 total players, but the Tigers had trouble kicking the ball as a team which is something Rutgers did very well. In a 1933 account, a Rutgers player from the game named John W. Herbert said that he thought Rutgers was the smaller team, but that they had more speed than Princeton.

== Reports ==
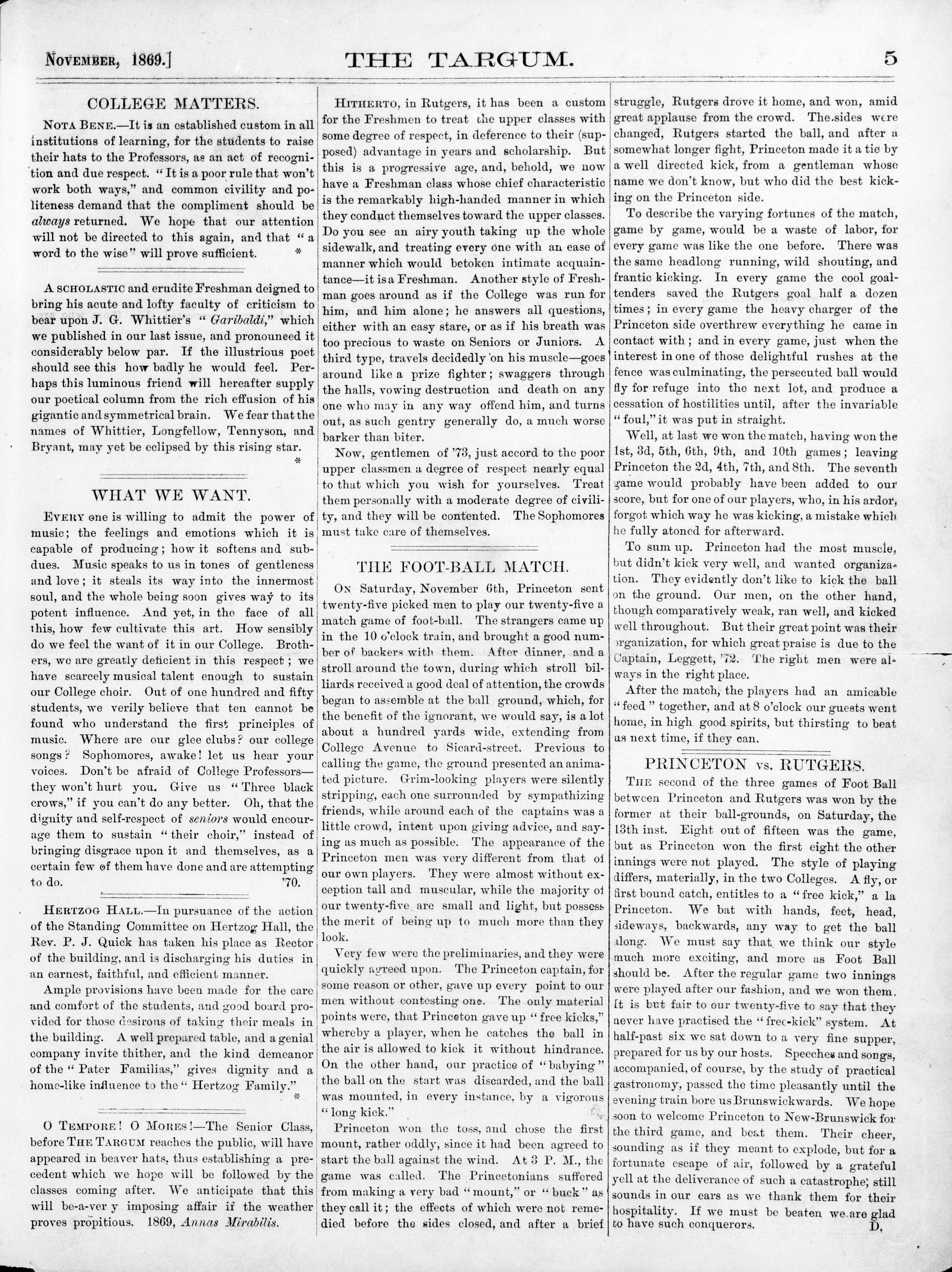
"The Foot-Ball Match", Chronicle of the first game in The Targum, Nov 1869

To appreciate this game to the full you must know something of its background," (...) "The two colleges were, and still are, of course, about 20 miles apart. The rivalry between them was intense. For years each had striven for possession of an old Revolutionary cannon, making night forays and lugging it back and forth time and again. (Note: Herbert's chronology, written in 1933 and noting "lugging it back and forth time and again", is inconsistent with more contemporary reports about the Rutgers–Princeton Cannon War that note a very limited number of events, due to extreme weight.) Not long before the first football game, the canny Princetonians had settled this competition in their own favor by ignominiously sinking the gun in several feet of concrete. In addition to this, I regret to report, Princeton had beaten Rutgers in baseball by the harrowing score of 40-2. Rutgers longed for a chance to square things."

— Rutgers' John Warne Herbert, Jr., 1933

"In every game the cool goaltenders saved the Rutgers goal half a dozen times; in every game the heavy charger of the Princeton side overthrew everything he came in contact with; and in every game, just when the interest in one of those delightful rushes at the fence was culminating, the persecuted ball would fly for refuge into the next lot, and produce cessation of hostilities until, after the invariable 'foul', it was put in straight (...) "To sum up, Princeton had the most muscle, but didn't kick very well, and wanted organization. They evidently don't like to kick the ball on the ground. Our men, on the other hand, though comparatively weak, ran well, and kicked well throughout. But their great point was the organization, for which great praise is due to the captain. The right men were always in the right place."

— match report in The Targum, Rutgers' undergraduate newspaper - November 1869

== Aftermath ==
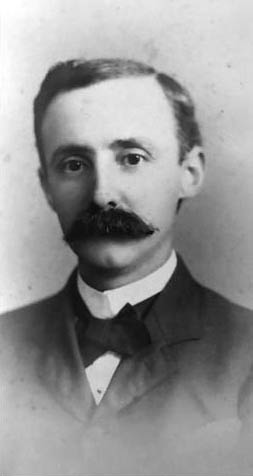
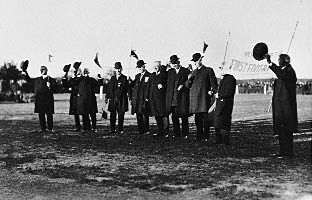
(Left): George Large, the last surviving player of Rutgers; (right): players of the 1869 Rutgers team being honored on the field in 1918

According to a retrospective story, the winning Rutgers students immediately ran Princeton's players out of town, forcing them to hastily return home "in their carriages." This suggests that the game also birthed the first passionate college football rivalry. However, a contemporary account published in The Targum describes the Princeton team traveling by train, not by carriage, and refers to an "amicable" postgame gathering followed by the Princeton team leaving "in good high spirits, but thirsting to beat us next time, if they can."

Fifty years after the historic first game, members of the 1869 Rutgers football team were honored at Homecoming ceremonies in 1918.

The last surviving player of Princeton, Robert Preston Lane (b. 1851) died in November 1938, while the last surviving Rutgers player, George H. Large (b. 1850) died in 1939.

In 1968, Arnold Friberg was commissioned by Chevrolet to create a painting commemorating the game. His work The First Game was one of four works that he created to celebrate 100 years of college football.

== Notable players ==
=== Rutgers ===
- William James Leggett, Captain of the Rutgers team in the game and distinguished clergyman in his later life.
- John Warne Herbert Jr., former mayor of Helmetta, Chairman of the State Highway Commission of New Jersey, and founding member at Augusta National Golf Club. He was the youngest player in the game.
- George Hall Large, Republican Party politician who served as President of the New Jersey Senate, and was the longest surviving participant in the game.
- George Riley Dixon, prominent lawyer and superintendent of schools in Elk County, Pennsylvania.
- Claudius Rockefeller, Captain of the 1872 Rutgers team, prominent lawyer, and member of the Rockefeller family.

=== Princeton ===
- William Stryker “Will” Gummere, Captain of the Princeton team in the game. Chief Justice of the Supreme Court of New Jersey.
- Jacob Edwin “Big Mike” Michael, prominent obstetrician and best player in the game.
- Alexander “Van” Van Rensselaer, professional tennis player and patron of Princeton University.
