= 1869–70 college soccer season =

- Number of teams: 6

Statistics
- Biggest home win: 8 goals: Princeton 8–0 Rutgers (November 13, 1869)
- Highest scoring: 10 goals: Rutgers 6–4 Princeton (November 6, 1869)

Seasons
- ← 1868–69 1870–71 →

The 1869–70 college soccer season was the fourth season of college soccer in the United States and the first known to have intercollegiate games. The 1869 season consisted of only two total games, both of which occurred between Rutgers University and Princeton University; The first was played on November 6 at Rutgers' campus, and the second was played on November 13 at Princeton's campus. The games are also considered the first ever college football games.

== Matches played ==
There were only two matches played between two different universities during the season, both between teams from Rutgers College (now Rutgers University) and the College of New Jersey (now Princeton University). Rutgers won the first match by a score of 6–4. Princeton won the second match 8–0.

The rules governing play were based on the London-based Football Association's 1863 rules that disallowed carrying or throwing the ball making it the first intercollegiate soccer game in the United States. In addition to being considered one of the earlier soccer games reported in the United States, these two games are considered to be the first organized American college football games to ever be played.

During the season there were other scheduled soccer matches scheduled that ended up being cancelled. A soccer game between the Virginia Military Institute and Washington & Lee University was scheduled for October 23, 1869, but the match was cancelled due to rain. There were intracollegiate matches played between student bodies at the University of Michigan, Brown University, and the College of New Jersey (now known as Princeton University).

== Conference table ==
The first game
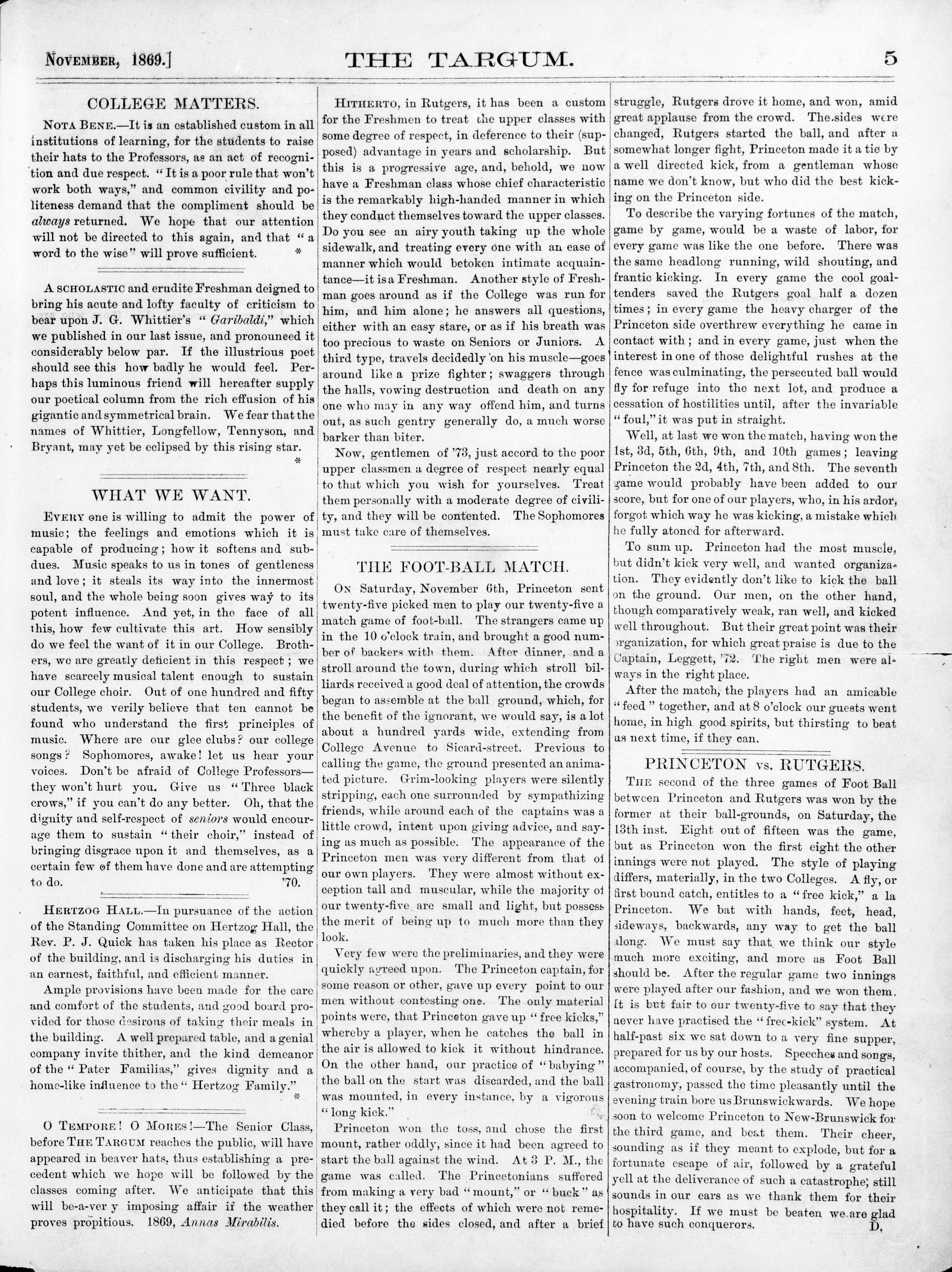
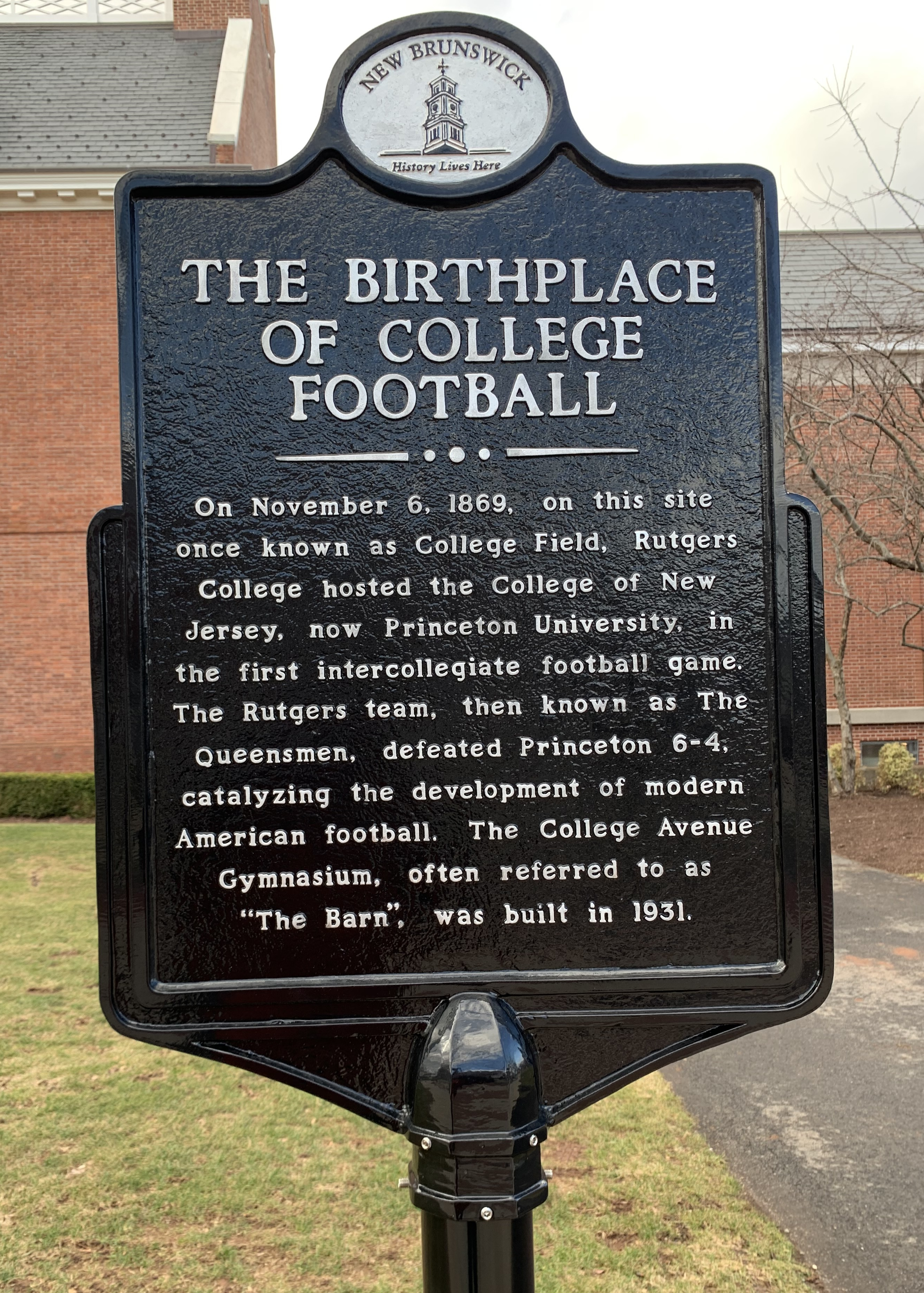
(Left): "The Foot-Ball Match", Chronicle of the first game at The Targum, Nov 1869;
(right): plaque on College Avenue on the New Brunswick campus of Rutgers University identifying the place where the game was played

1869–70 college soccer records
	Conf.			Overall
Team	W	L	T	W		L		T
Princeton ‡		–		1	–	1	–	0
Rutgers		–		1	–	1	–	0
Brown		–		1	–	1	–	0
Michigan		–		1	–	1	–	0
VMI		–		0	–	0	–	0
Washington & Lee		–		0	–	0	–	0
‡ National champion (ASHA)

== See also ==
- The First Game
- 1860s in American soccer
- 1869 college football season
