= George H. Large =

American lawyer, politician, and college football player (1850–1939)

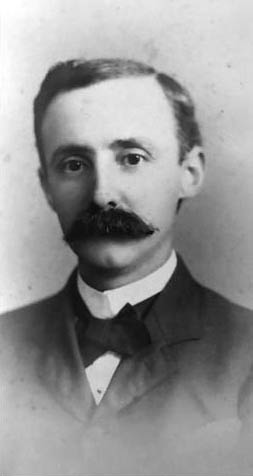
- Historical sketch of George H. Large at Rutgers University

30th President of the New Jersey Senate
- In office 1888–1889
- Preceded by: Frederick Samuel Fish
- Succeeded by: George Theodore Werts

Member of the New Jersey Senate from Hunterdon County
- In office 1886–1889
- Preceded by: John Carpenter Jr.
- Succeeded by: Moses K. Everett

Personal details
- Born: December 1, 1850 Whitehouse Station section of Readington Township, Hunterdon County, New Jersey
- Died: August 15, 1939 (aged 88) Flemington, New Jersey, U.S.
- Party: Republican Party
- Spouse: Josephine Ramsey Large
- Children: 3
George H. Large
Personal information
- Listed height: 5 ft 8 in (1.73 m)

George Hall Large (December 1, 1850 – August 15, 1939) was an American lawyer and Republican Party politician who served as President of the New Jersey Senate. He was also the longest-surviving participant in the first-ever college football game played in 1869.

== Early life ==
Large was born in 1850 in the Whitehouse Station section of Readington Township, Hunterdon County, New Jersey, the son of John K. and Eliza (Hall) Large. He was tutored at local schools before attending Rutgers College.

== Rutgers ==
On November 6, 1869, Large was one of 25 Rutgers players to face The College of New Jersey (now Princeton University) in the first intercollegiate football game ever played, at College Field in New Brunswick, New Jersey. Midway through the game, Large collided with Princeton player Jacob Edwin Michael, known as "Big Mike." Large was knocked unconscious but was revived after several minutes. Large was only 5’ 8” tall. Rutgers went on to win the game by a score of 6–4.

At Rutgers, Large was also associate editor of The Targum. He graduated in 1872.

== Legal and political career ==
After graduating from Rutgers, Large read law and was admitted to the New Jersey bar in 1875. He first practiced law with his brother-in-law John N. Voorhees in Flemington and then opened his own law office in 1882.

In 1885, Large ran successfully for the New Jersey Senate on the Republican ticket. He was the first Republican elected to the State Senate from traditionally Democratic Hunterdon County. In 1888, he was selected as Senate President.

He served as acting governor when Governor Robert S. Green was out of the state. Until 2010, in the event of a gubernatorial vacancy, the New Jersey Constitution had specified that the President of the Senate (followed by the Speaker of the New Jersey General Assembly) would assume the role of Acting Governor and retain their role in the Senate (or Assembly). An Acting Governor would then assume the governorship while retaining their role in their house of the legislature.

In 1889, President Benjamin Harrison appointed Large the Collector of Internal Revenue for New Jersey's Fifth District. He served in this position for five years before returning to private practice.

Large joined with his son, George K. Large, to establish the Flemington law firm of Large & Large (later known as Large, Scammell & Danziger). From 1900, he owned the Greek Revival mansion located at 117 Main Street in Flemington, designed in 1847 for James N. Reading (now known as the Reading-Large House). The historic Reading-Large house is currently occupied by the law firm of Large, Scammell & Danziger LLC and other businesses.

== Later life ==
Large married the former Josephine Ramsey on November 15, 1877, and she died not long before their sixtieth anniversary, on January 5, 1937. They had three children: George Knowles (born February 3, 1879), Edwin Kirk (born August 14, 1880), and Helen Brokaw (born August 12, 1889). George K. Large served as judge of the Hunterdon County Court of Common Pleas and was an assistant prosecutor in the Lindbergh kidnapping trial. Edwin K. Large served as postmaster of Atlanta, Georgia.

Large outlived all of the other participants in the 1869 Rutgers-Princeton game. On November 5, 1938, when Rutgers defeated Princeton for the first time since the original game, Large was on hand for the victory. Coincidentally, William Preston Lane, the last surviving Princeton player, had died that morning.

In 1939, Large died at his Flemington home at the age of 88.

Political offices
| Preceded by Frederick S. Fish | President of the New Jersey Senate; 1888 | Succeeded by George T. Werts |
| Preceded by John Carpenter Jr. | Member of the New Jersey Senate from Hunterdon County; 1886-1889 | Succeeded by Moses K. Everett |
