= William J. Leggett =

American football player (1848–1925)

William James Leggett
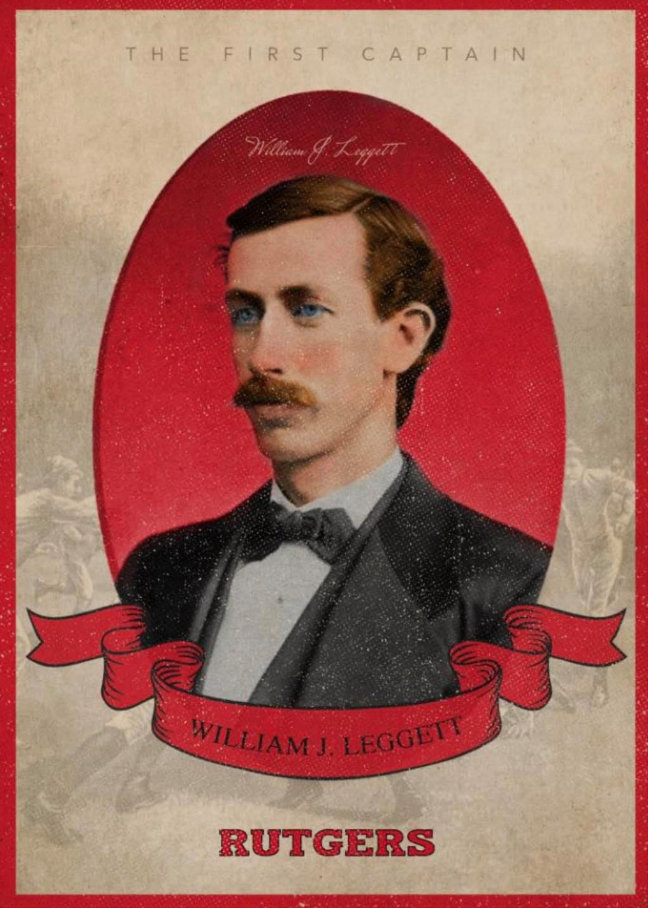

Personal information
- Born: October 12, 1848; Ghent, New York, U.S.
- Died: October 28, 1925 (aged 77); Nyack, New York, U.S.

Career information
- High school: Claverack School
- College: Rutgers University (1869–1872) New Brunswick Seminary School

Awards and highlights
- Rutgers Athletics Hall of Fame (1989)

William James Leggett (October 12, 1848 – October 28, 1925) was an American college football player who was the team captain of Rutgers in the first college football game.

== Early life ==
Leggett was born on October 12, 1848, in Ghent, New York to William Leggett and Emily August Sargent Leggett. He went to school at the District School and Hudson River Institute at Claverack, New York and attended college at Rutgers University as well as New Brunswick Theological Seminary.

== Rutgers ==
In 1869, he organized a football team of Rutgers classmates to play against Princeton University. He was named captain by his teammates. Shortly before the game started, Leggett and William S. Gummere, the Princeton captain, developed the rules of play. Under the guidance of Leggett, Rutgers won the first game in football history 6 to 4. In the second game, Rutgers would lose to Princeton 0 to 8. He was also captain of the team the following year. He graduated from Rutgers 1872.

Before graduating, he won prizes in Latin and declamation. He was also the editor of The Daily Targum, director of the baseball team, and captain and stroke of the RU crew team. He was President of his class his Sophomore year. He was President of the ''Targum'' Association and Marshal President of the Philoclean Society. He won the Bradley Mathematical Prize his senior year.

== Later life ==
After Rutgers, he attended New Brunswick Theological Seminary from 1872 to 1875.

In 1875, Leggett became a pastor, which was his occupation until 1917. He became a Licensed Classis of Hudson on May 24, 1875 and an Ordained Classis of Rensalear on May 31, 1875. He took post-graduate courses at New York University from 1889-1891.

After 1917 he became the vice president of the General Synod of the Dutch Reformed Church where he would serve until his death in 1925. He was pastor of Reformed Churches in Albany, New York; Schodack Landing, New York, Claverack, New York, Belleville, New Jersey, and Nyack, New York. He was president of the board of superintendents of the New Brunswick Theological Seminary.

He helped compile a book on the Class of 1872, ''Class of 1872, Rutgers College, History to 1917.'' He helped compile the biographies for the Classical section, and John Warne Herbert Jr. and another student helped compile the biographies for the Science section.

He was married to Mary Eva Parsell on May 17, 1876, in New Brunswick, New Jersey.

Leggett died on October 28, 1925, in Nyack, New York, from a stroke. He was 77 at the time of his death. He was inducted into the Rutgers Athletics Hall of Fame in 1989.
