= George Riley Dixon =

American football player and lawyer (1848–1912)

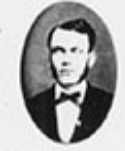

Personal information
- Born: July 23, 1848; Neversink, Sullivan County, New York, U.S.
- Died: June 11, 1912 (aged 63); Ridgway, Pennsylvania, U.S.

George Riley Dixon (July 23, 1848 - June 11, 1912) was an American college football player and lawyer. He was a member of the Rutgers team in the first ever college football game. He was a member of the Pennsylvania Legislature, representing Elk County, from 1893 to 1901.

== Early life and education ==
Dixon was born on July 23, 1848, in Neversink, Sullivan County, New York, to Henry and Catherine Dixon. He was orphaned at 13 years old and moved in with J.L. Lamoree of Grahamville, New York.

He graduated from the academy in Monticello, New York on June 20, 1868, and then attended Rutgers Prep for one year. He entered Rutgers University in 1969 and joined Delta Upsilon; was a member of the original Rutgers football team; he won the Van Doreen prize for Essay on Christian Missions and was a commencement speaker when he graduated from Rutgers University in 1873.

== Career ==
Upon graduation, he moved to Ridgway, Pennsylvania where he was the principal of the local school for two years. He was elected the County Superintendent of the schools of Elk County, Pennsylvania, which position he held for twelve years. He studied law under a couple lawyers and was admitted to the bar on May 30, 1878. On December 4, 1884, he purchased the Elk Democrat and ran that journal for several years. He published "A complete history of school education in Elk County."

He was a member of Knapp Commandery of the Knights Templar; a Democrat; and multiple time Chairman of the Elk County Committee. He represented Elk County four times in the Pennsylvania Legislature, from 1893 to 1901.

== Later life ==
In September 1874, he married Susan Eaton, with whom he had three children. He died on June 13, 1912, in Ridgway, Pennsylvania.
