= 1869 Princeton Tigers football team =

American college football season

1869 Princeton Tigers football

National champion (Billingsley, NCF) Co-national champion (Davis)
- Conference: Independent
- Record: 1–1
- Head coach: None
- Captain: William Stryker Gummere

1869 college football records
	Conf.			Overall
Team	W	L	T	W		L		T
Princeton		–		1	–	1	–	0
Rutgers		–		1	–	1	–	0

The 1869 Princeton Tigers football team represented the College of New Jersey, more commonly known as Princeton College, in the 1869 college football season. The team finished with a 1–1 record and was retroactively named national champions by the Billingsley Report and National Championship Foundation, and as the co-national champions by Parke H. Davis. Princeton's first captain was William S. Gummere, who was 17 during the season.

On November 6, the team played at Rutgers in what has been called the first intercollegiate American football game. Rutgers won the game 6–4, which was played using rules adapted from the Football Association rules of the time, which more closely resembled soccer than current American football. Rutgers traveled to Princeton the next week to play under Princeton's rules, the Tigers won 8–0.

== Schedule ==
Date	Time	Opponent	Site	Result	Source
November 6	3:00 p.m.	at Rutgers	College Field; New Brunswick, NJ (rivalry)	L 4–6	
November 13		Rutgers	Princeton, NJ	W 8–0	

== Roster ==
Below is a list of the 24 known players on the 1869 Princeton University football team:

- Charles Scudder “Charlie” Barrett (1850-1925), 1871
- George S. Billmeyer (1849-1917), 1871
- Homer Davenport “Dutch” Boughner (1848-1938), 1871
- William Frazier Henley “Billy” Buck (1849-1890), 1870
- Francis Clayton “Frank” Burt (1850-1916), 1871
- William Cox “Grandfather” Chambers (1850-1879), 1871
- Charles Winters “Charlie” Darst (1849-1900), 1871
- Chauncey Mitchell “Chaunce” Field (1850-1895), 1871
- William Wetmore “Flag” Flagler (1850-1910), 1871
- William Bynum “Tar Heel” Glenn (1847-1892), 1870
- William Stryker “Will” Gummere (1852-1933), 1870
- James Winthrop “Calf” Hageman (1852-1933) (1852-1924), 1872
- Charles Seth “Pipe-Stems” Lane (1848-1916), 1872
- William Preston “Bunch” Lane (1851-1938), 1872 (last surviving member of the team)
- George Williamson “G.” Mann (1853-1925), 1872
- Jacob Edwin “Big Mike” Michael (1848-1895), 1871
- David “Dave” Mixsell (1849-1913), 1871
- Lee Hampton “Honeyman” Nissley (1844-1912), 1870
- Hughes “Olly” Oliphant (1850-1920), 1870
- Charles Joel “Charlie” Parker (1848-1917), 1870
- Jerome Edward “Jerry” Sharp (1852-1928), 1870
- Alexander “Van” Van Rensselaer (1850-1933), 1871
- John Green “Colonel” Weir (1849-1911), 1871
- Thomas Sears “Tom” Young, Jr. (1848-1909), 1871

The 25th player on the team is unknown, but possible candidates include: Robert Agnew (1870); Thomas Bruen Brown (1870); Glynn Brown (1870); James Chambers (1872); Edmund David (1870); Samul Evans Ewing (1872); Thomas Glenn (1871); Arthur Johnson (1872); Arthur Pell (1873); Thomas Swenk (1870); Edward Terbell (1871); Frank A. Ward (1870)

== See also ==
- List of historically significant college football games
- List of the first college football games in each U.S. state
