= William Stryker Gummere =

American judge (1852-1933)

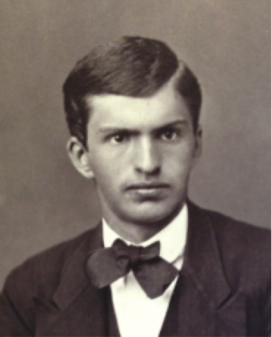
- Gummere during his time at Princeton
- Born: June 24, 1852; Trenton, New Jersey, U.S.
- Died: January 26, 1933 (aged 80); Newark, New Jersey, U.S.
- Resting place: Newark, New Jersey, U.S.
- Education: Trenton Academy; Lawrenceville School; Princeton
- Occupations: Lawyer, judge
- Years active: 1873–1933
- Known for: Chief Justice of the Supreme Court of New Jersey; co-founder of college football
- Children: 3
- Relatives: Samuel R. Gummeré (brother)

William Stryker Gummere (/ɡʌˈmɛər/; June 24, 1852 – January 26, 1933) was an American lawyer who served as chief justice of the Supreme Court of New Jersey. He was also captain of the Princeton football team that met Rutgers in 1869 in the first intercollegiate American football game.

== Biography ==
Gummere was born in Trenton, New Jersey, on June 24, 1852, to Barker Gummere and Elizabeth Chambers (Stryker) Gummere. His father was from a “prominent Quaker family of Burlington County,” and was a local lawyer and Clerk of Chancery Court for a time and a leading member of the state bar. A brother, Samuel R. Gummeré, served as United States Ambassador to Morocco.

=== College ===
Gummere was captain of the Princeton football team (the school was officially named the College of New Jersey during the time he attended). Tradition holds that Gummere personally accepted Rutgers’ challenge to play a series of three football games after Princeton had given them a thumping in baseball. In 1869–70, he roomed with Jacob Edwin Michael, known as "Big Mike", the star of the football team. He is known as one of the seven founders of college football by the College Football Hall of Fame.

In addition to playing football for Princeton, Gummere also played second-base for the Princeton Tigers baseball team. He is credited as the inventor of the "hook-slide." In an exhibition game between Princeton and the Philadelphia Athletics in the spring of 1870. Gummere, a great center fielder, got to first on a base hit and started to steal second. On the way down he saw that the catcher's throw would get to the bag ahead of him. Knowing that the catcher always threw the ball shoulder high and that the second baseman, Al Reach (later a manufacturer of sporting goods), invariably turned around to tag the runner standing up, Gummere threw himself feet first at the bag and buried his face in his right arm for protection. When the second baseman turned to tag him, he discovered Gummere stretched out under his feet, safely out of reach.

=== Career ===
After graduating from Princeton in 1870 at the age of 18, Gummere studied law at his father's law office in Trenton and was admitted to the bar in 1873, the same year he received his A.M. from Princeton. Gummere received an honorary LL.D. in June 1902 from Princeton. In the Class of 1870's 20th reunion book, Gummere said he was a Republican. "Consequently," he added, "I have never held office. Republicans don't as a usual thing hold office in New Jersey." This pessimism proved premature because five years later a Democratic governor appointed Gummere to the Supreme Court of New Jersey, and six years after that a Republican governor appointed him Chief Justice, a position he held until his death 32 years later.

Gummere became popularly known as "Dollar-a-life Gummere" after his July 1896 ruling in the Jersey City case Abram Graham vs. Jersey City Consolidated Traction Company where a child had been killed in a street railroad accident and the parents sued, seeking $50,000 compensation for the child's death, but Justice Gummere awarded a single dollar, ruling that that amount was the value of a child to its parents. On appeal, Justice Gummere's verdict was overturned and the parents ultimately received $1,000 in 1901. Gummere was appointed an associate justice of the New Jersey Supreme Court in February 1895. On January 28, 1901, he was appointed to the position of chief justice and sworn in as such on November 19, 1901, along with Mahlon Pitney who was sworn in on same day as associate justice.

Gummere died of pneumonia on January 26, 1933, in Newark, New Jersey, and was buried from historic Grace Church in Newark and interred in Princeton Cemetery.

Legal offices
Preceded by Charles Ewing	Chief Justice of the New Jersey Supreme Court; 1901–1933	Succeeded by Thomas J. Brogan
