= Jacob Edwin Michael =

American football player (1848–1895)

James Edwin Michael
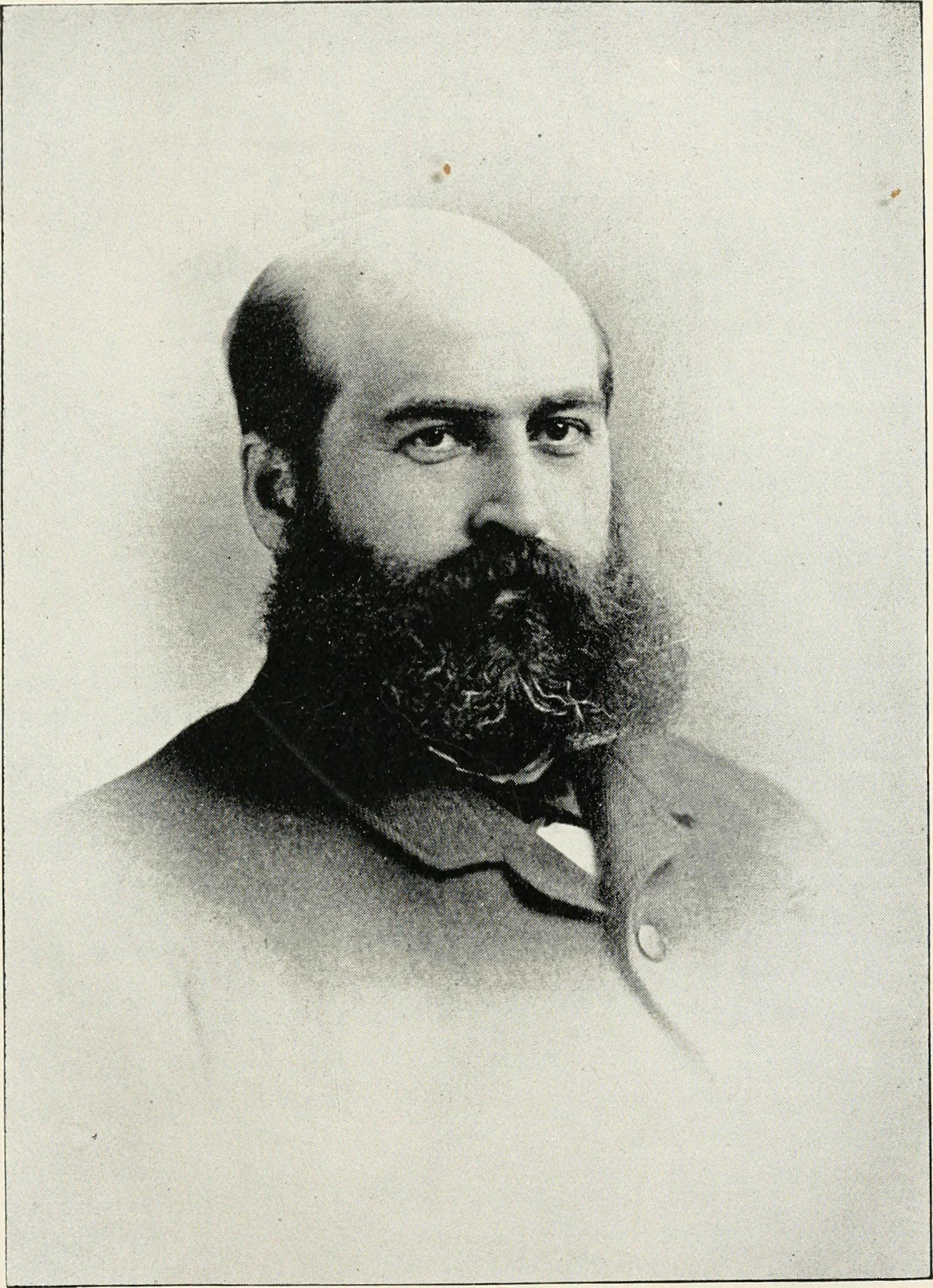
- Historical sketch of Michael at the University of Maryland

Personal information
- Born: May 13, 1848; Michaelsville, Maryland, U.S.
- Died: December 7, 1895 (aged 47); Baltimore, Maryland, U.S.
- Listed height: 6 ft 0 in (1.83 m)
- Listed weight: 215 lb (98 kg)

Career information
- High school: Newark Academy
- College: Princeton

James Edwin Michael (May 13, 1848 – December 7, 1895), known as "Big Mike", was an American college football player for the Princeton football team, who was the best player in the first college football game.

== Early life and education ==
He was born on May 13, 1848 in Michaelsville in Harford County, Maryland to Jacob J. Michael, a large landowner in Harford County. He grew up on his father's farm near the Chesapeake Bay.

He was educated at St. Timothy's Hall in Catonsville, Maryland and then at the Newark Academy, a Presbyterian secondary school in Newark, Delaware, which later became the University of Delaware.

== Princeton ==
In 1869, he played for the Princeton Tigers in the first ever college football game against Rutgers College (later Rutgers University). He was considered to be the best player in the game. He was roommates with the team captain, William Stryker Gummere, who later became a judge.

His athletic prowess and strength were touted by many. Mark F. Bernstein wrote in, "Football: The Ivy League Origins of an American Obsession," that "Big Mike and a Rutgers player made for the ball at the same time and crashed through the fence, toppling spectators." Parke Davis, a historian, wrote that Michael "bowled over Rutgers men like so many ten pins and in every action his burly form loomed supreme."

In 1871, Michael won the Thomson Prize for heavyweight gymnastics. He was in the Sigma Chi fraternity at Princeton. After his graduation from Princeton, he was considered by many to be the best athlete to have ever attended the college.

== Education after Princeton ==
He received his A.B. from Princeton University in 1871, and his medical degree from the University of Maryland in College Park in 1873. Then he studied for a year abroad at Wurzburg, Germany and Vienna, Austria in 1873 and 1874.

== Medical career ==
From 1874 to 1880, he served as a demonstrator of anatomy, and then a professor of anatomy until 1890. Then he was a professor of obstetrics until 1895 at the University of Maryland. He was the chairman of Anatomy and Clinical Surgery and then the chairman of Obstetrics at the University of Maryland.

He was editor of the Maryland Medical Journal, the president of the Clinical Society, and the president of the Baltimore Medical Society. In 1885, he became the vice president of the Medical & Chirurgical Faculty and in 1888-1889, he became its president, holding the position until his death. In 1896, Michael became the president of the Alumni Association of the University of Maryland and a lecturer on Early Aid, and the president of the Princeton Alumni Association of Maryland ("PAAMD"). He was a member of the American Association of Obstetricians and Gynecologists, the Southern Surgical and Gynecological Society, the American Surgical Association, and the American Medical Association.

== Family ==
In December 1875, he was married to Susie Mitchell and they had six children.

== Death ==
Michael died on December 7, 1895 in Baltimore. His remains were buried in the family burial plot near Perryman, Maryland. A medical journal’s eulogy referenced his “magnificent physique” as well as his great intellect.

== Publications ==
- The American Association of Obstetricians and Gynecologists: Obstetric Antisepsis. , J. Edwin Michael, 1895
