= Rutgers–Princeton Cannon War =

Part of the rivalry between Princeton University and Rutgers University

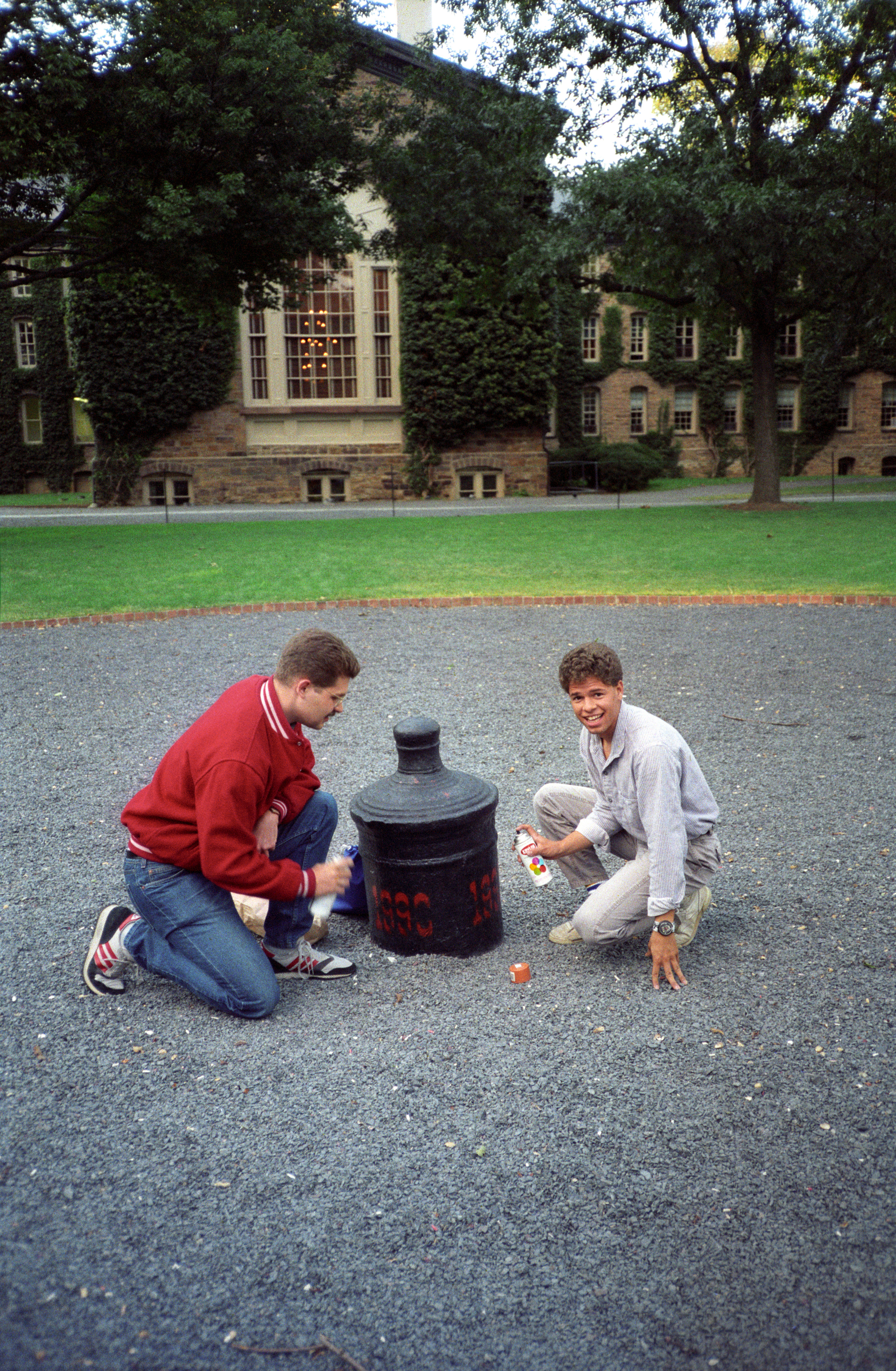
Two student painting "Big Cannon" at Princeton

The Rutgers–Princeton Cannon War refers to a series of incidents involving two Revolutionary War cannons and a rivalry between Princeton University in Princeton, New Jersey, and Rutgers University in New Brunswick, New Jersey. The term "cannon war" was used in this context as early as 1875.

"Big Cannon" is located behind Princeton's Nassau Hall in the center of the quadrangle there, called Cannon Green. (Note: Big Cannon is located at 40.34821°N 74.65910°W.) Buried vertically since 1840, only part of the cannon remains visible. (Note: Big Cannon is sinking over time, having been measured at heights of 58 inches (150 cm) in 1893, 36 inches (91 cm) in 1991, and 25 inches (64 cm) in 2007.) "Little Cannon" is buried near the front of Whig Hall, approximately 125 feet (38 m) from Big Cannon, in a similar manner. (Note: Little Cannon is located at 40.34794°N 74.65881°W.) Big Cannon is sometimes painted red by Rutgers students, particularly in the week leading to Rutgers commencement as well as on other notable Rutgers dates.

== Background ==
Rutgers and Princeton are both located in Central New Jersey, about 17 miles (27 km) from each other. Princeton was founded in Elizabeth, New Jersey, in 1746. Originally known as the College of New Jersey, the school relocated to Princeton 10 years later. Rutgers was founded in New Brunswick in 1766 and was originally known as Queen's College.

In 1864, Rutgers educators George Hammell Cook and David Murray led a successful campaign to designate Rutgers as New Jersey's designated land-grant university, overcoming competition from other colleges in the state, notably Princeton. On November 6, 1869, Rutgers defeated Princeton in New Brunswick at the first intercollegiate football game on a field where Rutgers' College Ave Gymnasium now stands, adding to the rivalry between the two schools.

== The cannons ==
Two Revolutionary War cannons were left in Princeton at the end of the war, although neither of them were used in the Battle of Princeton, as is often claimed. These cannons have come to be known as "Big Cannon" and "Little Cannon".

For the War of 1812, Big Cannon was transported to New Brunswick to help defend the city against potential attack by the British, remaining on the Rutgers campus until it was taken back to Princeton in 1836 by the "Princeton Blues", a local militia. Unfortunately, the wagon it was being transported in broke down on the outskirts of Princeton, and the cannon did not reach the Princeton campus until 1838 when Leonard Jerome, the maternal grandfather of Winston Churchill, led a large group of students who brought it to Nassau Hall. The cannon was planted, muzzle down, in its current location in 1840. (Note: Some sources state that Big Cannon was used for training during and after the Civil War (1861–1865) by Rutgers cadets; however, this is inconsistent with the cannon being buried in its current location since 1840.)

Little Cannon was concealed during the War of 1812, and rendered inoperable several decades later for safety reasons. After being on display in the town of Princeton for an unspecified number of years, it was moved to the college campus in 1858 to a location near Big Cannon, and was buried there in 1869. Some Rutgers students dug up the cannon in April 1871, but were unsuccessful in taking it away.

== Cannon "war" ==
=== 1875 events ===
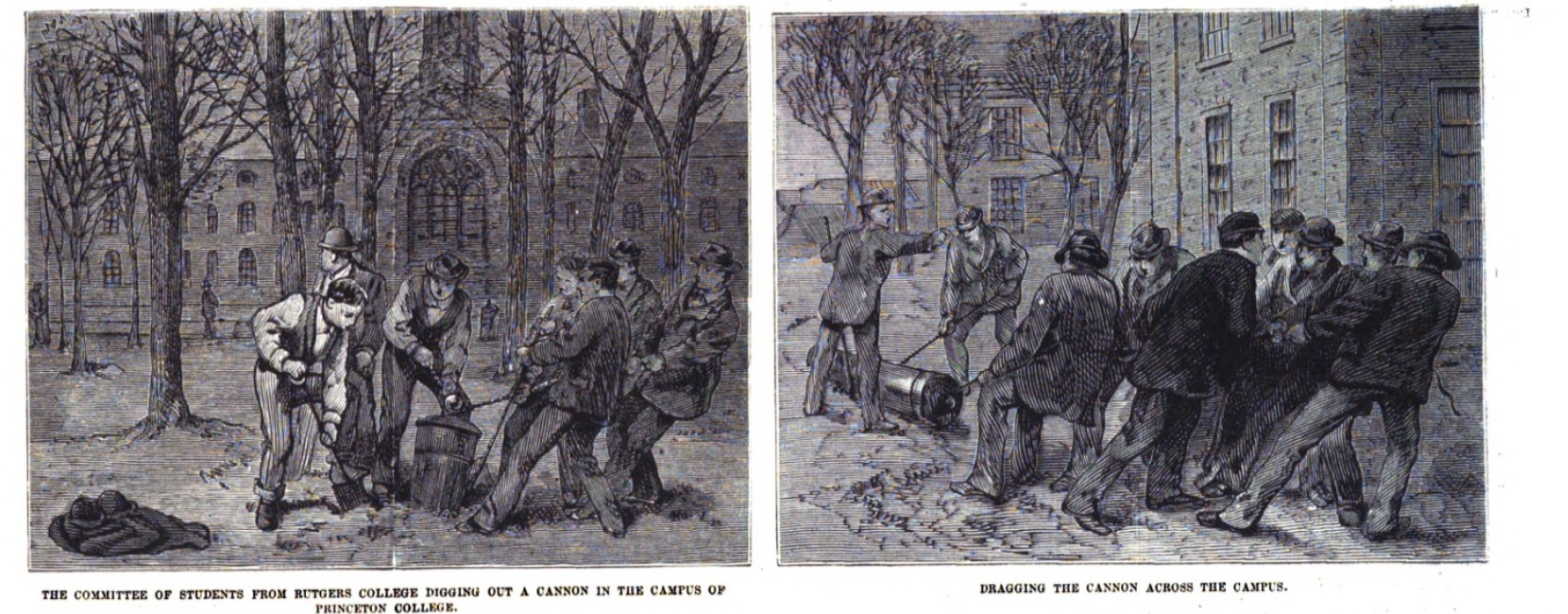
Drawings of Rutgers college students attempting to dig up Big Cannon, then taking Little Cannon, on April 25, 1875

On the night of April 25, 1875, ten members of the Rutgers Class of 1877 set out to take Big Cannon back from Princeton. However, they were unable to move it, so instead they returned to New Brunswick with Little Cannon. Princeton responded with a raid on Rutgers, taking some muskets, and the heads of the two colleges exchanged polite but demanding correspondence. Eventually, a joint committee settled the matter, and Little Cannon was returned to Princeton, escorted by the New Brunswick police chief.

=== 20th century ===
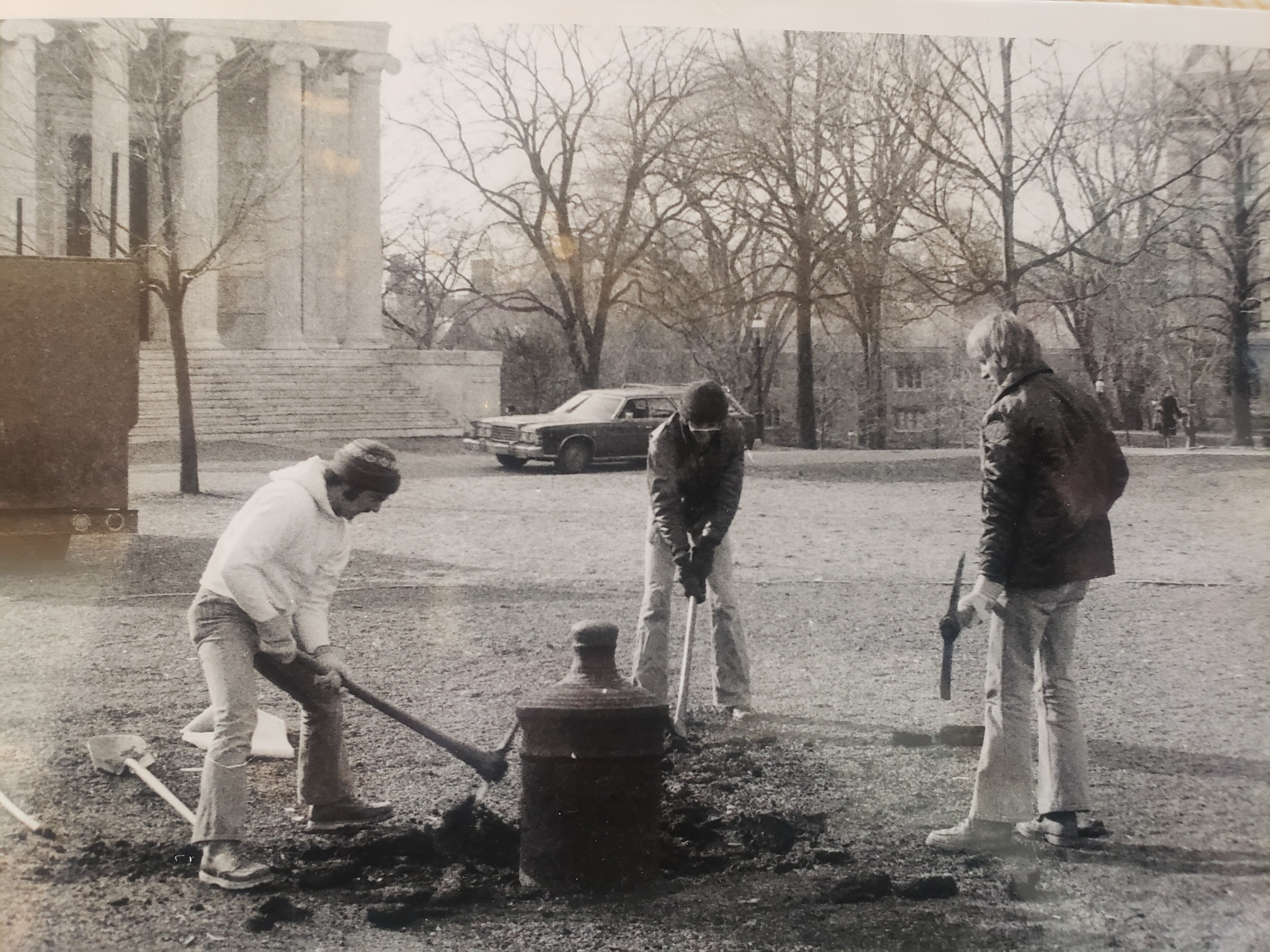
January 1976: Three of the five Rutgers students actively digging up the cannon in broad daylight after successfully clearing security with their phony papers, only to be thwarted minutes later by Princeton security.

In September 1969, prior to the annual Rutgers–Princeton football game, Little Cannon was apparently stolen. A large hole was found in the lawn near Whig Hall, and the cannon seemed to be missing. Campus police were baffled, given its extreme weight. It was later discovered that the cannon had not been taken—it was buried under the dirt that had been dug out of the hole. Also revealed was that it had not been done by Rutgers students, it had been done by a group of Princeton students as a hoax. Some contemporary news reports stated that the Princeton students had intended to hide the cannon so that Rutgers students could not steal it, but this is inconsistent with later accounts.

On January 31, 1976, five Rutgers students and an elderly woman (the grandmother of one of the students) executed their year-long plan in an attempt to recover Big Cannon. The group opted to create a fictitious New Jersey Citizens Bicentennial Committee (NJCBC) and infiltrate the campus with a phony story. They found a contact in Princeton and managed to obtain a security pass. That pass, along with the matron who posed as the Chairman of the NJCBC made things look legitimate enough to get their trucks and heavy equipment through security and onto Princeton grounds. A cover letter, which they gave to the security guards read that their committee had secured permission from appropriate university officials to remove the cannon to be taken on a statewide bicentennial tour. But within minutes of starting to dig, a Princeton University detective approached the group and foiled their plans, declaring "all right you guys, we know you're from Rutgers." The group later found out why the plan failed. As fate would have it, the detective's wife's friend was secretary of the real New Jersey State Bicentennial Commission. A phone call by the detective quickly blew the "cannon-nappers'" cover. The six were initially accused of malicious mischief, but after pleading "it was only a lark" by the grandmother, all charges were dropped.

=== 21st century ===
A few Rutgers students spiritedly painting the cannon on the Princeton University campus

In February 2010, the Cannon War between loyal Rutgers and Princeton students became more than just "the painting of a cannon." In the depths of 2 feet (0.6 m) of snow, students not only painted the cannon and its surrounding concrete, but used spray paint to "tag" Princeton classroom buildings, dormitories, and libraries.

In November 2011, a group of Rutgers students who went to paint the cannon in Princeton brought a video camera with them and made a documentary about the tradition. The footage became part of a larger project about the history of the Cannon War and its perception in the minds of current students today. The film Knights, Tigers, and Cannons. Oh My! by Zack Morrison premiered at the New Jersey Film Festival in September 2012, and won the award for Best Student Film.

== See also ==
- Colonial colleges
- History of New Jersey
- List of practical joke topics

== Sources ==
- Demarest, William Henry Steele. History of Rutgers College: 1776-1924. (New Brunswick, NJ: Rutgers College, 1924). (No ISBN)
- Lukac, George J. (ed.), Aloud to Alma Mater. (New Brunswick, New Jersey: Rutgers University Press, 1966), 70-73. (No ISBN)
- McCormick, Richard P. Rutgers: a Bicentennial History. (New Brunswick, NJ: Rutgers University Press, 1966). ISBN 0-8135-0521-6
- Schmidt, George P. Princeton and Rutgers: The Two Colonial Colleges of New Jersey. (Princeton, NJ: Van Nostrand, 1964). (No ISBN)
- "Again, War Over A Cannon: Rivals Besmirch Princeton Gun," in Life. Vol. 35, No. 17. October 26, 1953. p. 147
