= 1869 college football season =

American college football season

- Total No. of teams: 2
- Regular season: November 6–13, 1869
- Champion(s): Princeton; Rutgers

The 1869 college football season was the first season of intercollegiate football in the United States. The teams played using improvised rules more closely resembling soccer and rugby than modern gridiron football, it is traditionally considered the inaugural college football season. The 1869 season consisted of only two games, both between Rutgers College, now known as Rutgers University, and the College of New Jersey, now known as Princeton University. The first game was played on November 6, 1869, at Rutgers' campus, and the second was played on November 13, 1869, at Princeton's campus. Both games were won by the home team.

The first college football national championship was awarded retroactively to the two teams. Princeton was named the champion by the Billingsley Report and the National Championship Foundation, while college football research historian Parke H. Davis named Rutgers and Princeton co-champions. Various other ratings and retrospectives have rated the teams differently.

The two games were played with rules very different from what is currently understood as American football today, and also played under home field rules that differed from each other. In both games there was no running with the ball, each team included 25 players, and the ball was perfectly spherical.

== First intercollegiate football game played ==
The first game
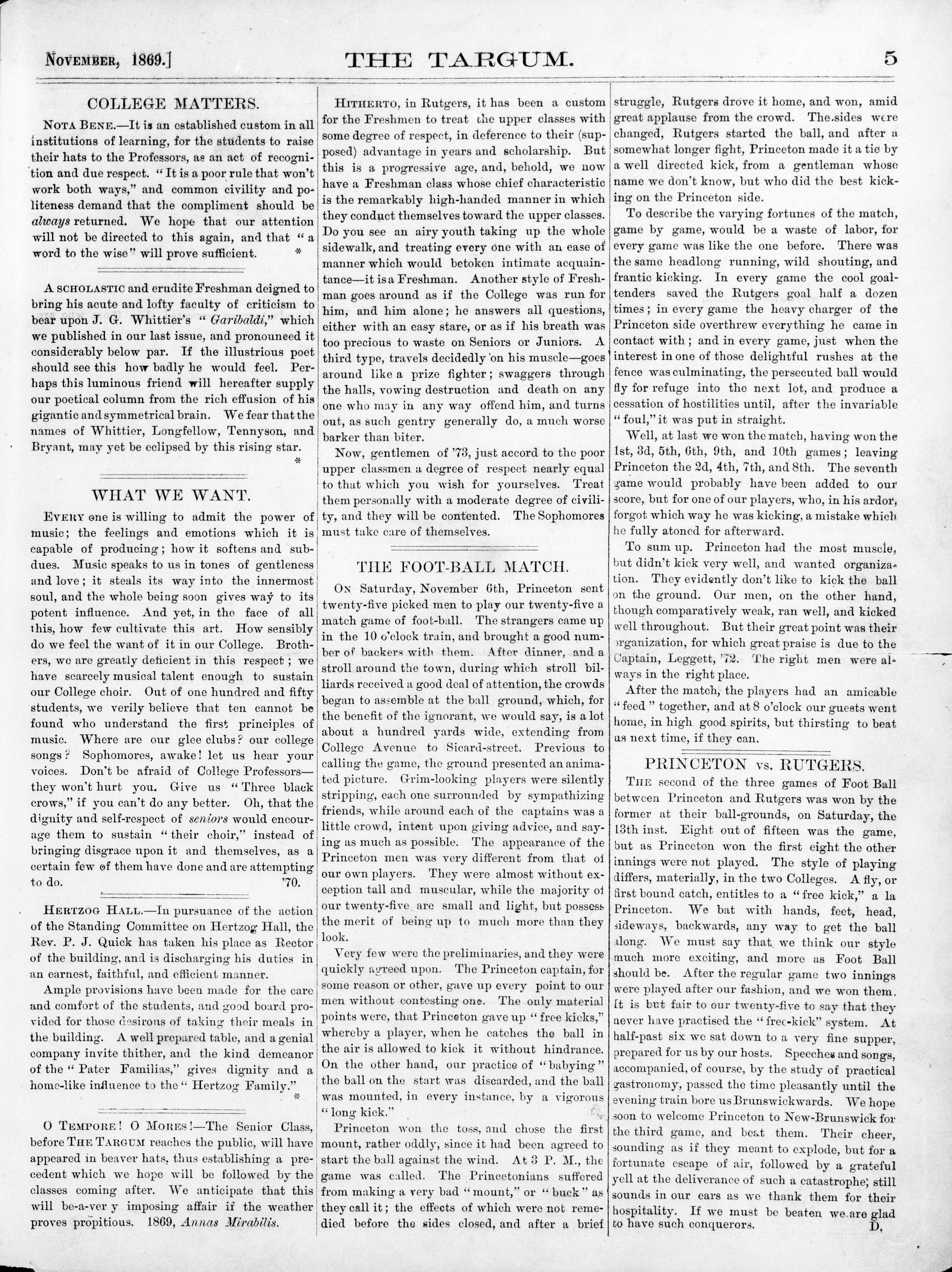
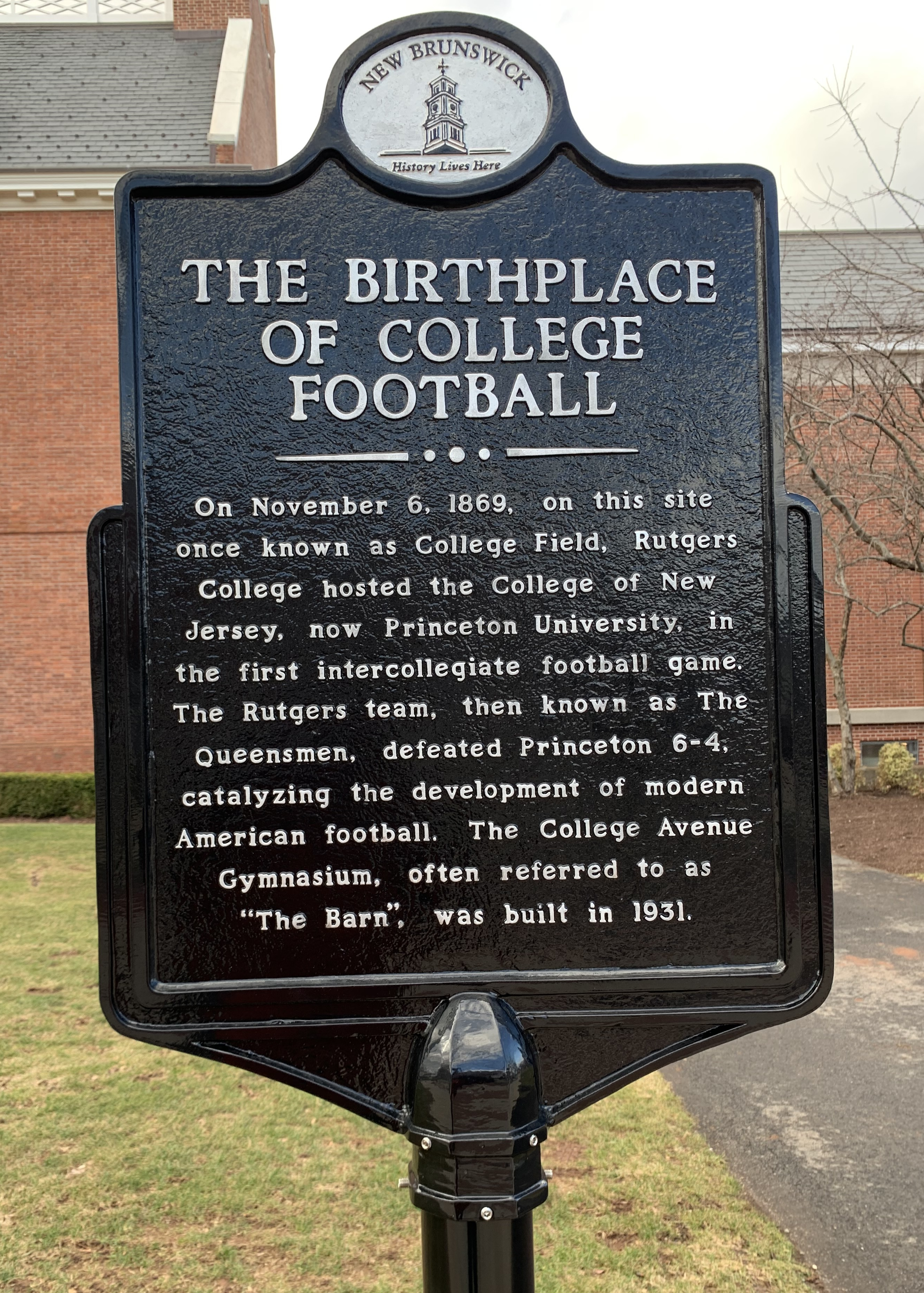
(Left): "The Foot-Ball Match", Chronicle of the first game in The Targum, Nov 1869;
(right): plaque on College Avenue on the New Brunswick campus of Rutgers University identifying the place where the game was played

Modern folklore places the very first game of college football as a contest between teams from Rutgers College, now Rutgers University, and the College of New Jersey, commonly known as Princeton College. Rutgers won the game by a score of 6–4. The rules of the game were much different back then than in modern football. Rutgers was represented by the Queensmen and Princeton by the Tigers.

== Rematch ==
A rematch was played at Princeton a week later under Princeton rules. One of the biggest differences in rules was the awarding of a "free kick" to any player that caught the ball on the fly. This rule seriously affected the speed advantage of Rutgers that had allowed them to win the first contest. Princeton won the second game by a score of 8 to 0.

== Aftermath ==
The two schools had originally scheduled to meet three times in 1869, but the third 1869 game never took place, reportedly because of the officials at both programs who complained about more emphasis being put on the contests rather than academics and studying. Other sources claim that it may have been canceled due to disagreement over what set of rules to play under. Due to each team winning one game, the inaugural football season ended with Princeton and Rutgers each tied at 1–1, and therefore each received a partial share of the 1869 college football national championship awarded retroactively.

Rutgers players from the first game were honored 50 years later in a ceremony at their homecoming. The last surviving member of this Rutgers team was George H. Large, who died in 1939. The last surviving member for Princeton was Robert Preston Lane, who died in 1938.

== Conference and program changes ==
Team	Former conference	New conference
Princeton Tigers	Program established	Independent
Rutgers Queensmen	Program established	Independent

== Conference standings ==
1869 college football records
	Conf.			Overall
Team	W	L	T	W		L		T
Princeton		–		1	–	1	–	0
Rutgers		–		1	–	1	–	0

== See also ==
- The First Game
- 1869–70 college soccer season
