= The First Game =

1968 painting by Arnold Friberg

- Artist: Arnold Friberg
- Year: 1968
- Medium: Oil on canvas
- Subject: First American football game
- Dimensions: 95 cm × 150 cm (37.5 in × 60 in)
- Designation: Chevrolet division (General Motors)
- Owner: Private collection (unknown)

The First Game is a painting by Arnold Friberg, and was commissioned in 1968 by the Chevrolet division of General Motors as one of four paintings to commemorate the then-upcoming centennial celebration of college football in the United States.

It depicts the famous first game of American intercollegiate football, played by Rutgers College (now Rutgers University) and the visiting College of New Jersey (by then more commonly known as Princeton College) on November 6, 1869, at College Field in New Brunswick, New Jersey. The game was played in front of 100 spectators, depicted in the picture in the background.

Friberg had some previous experience in advertising art, having taught the discipline at Utah University in the 1950s. He had also made a series of paintings to promote Cecil B. DeMille's film The Ten Commandments.

== The picture ==
In The First Game, Friberg extolled the fight and physical strength of the game. His painting shows how bruised players collide each other. Some of them even have blood stains in their uniforms. Rutgers players wear a headscarf that resembles a piracy-style. The ball is small and round, like an association football. The field is covered by dry leaves, as usual in November, when the game was played. Spectators are seen at background, some are sitting on a fence, and others run along the players.

Spectators depicted include a Rutgers professor who is reported to have waved his umbrella at the participants while yelling, "You will come to no Christian end!" Friberg included the man with the umbrella in the painting as a tribute.

== Aftermath ==
The other three paintings that completed the series were The Coach (dedicated to Knute Rockne), Howell to Hutson (using teammates on the 1934 Alabama team to illustrate the development of the passing game), and O.J. Runs for Daylight, depicting a moment in the 1967 game between UCLA and USC.

The four paintings were exhibited during a tour that visited the main seats of NCAA, the organization that regulates college sports in the United States.

== See also ==
- Early history of American football
