= List of Princeton Tigers football seasons =

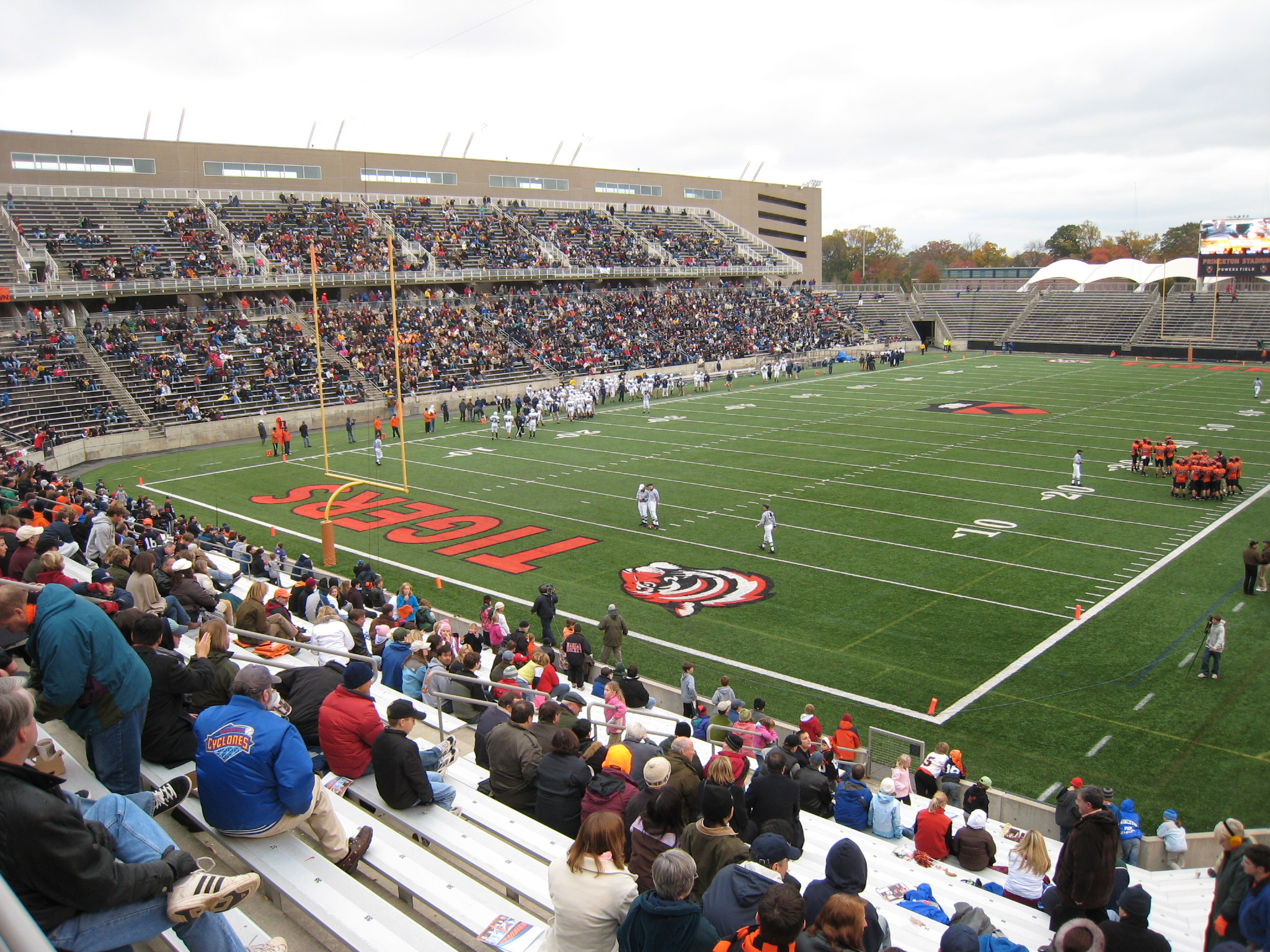
Princeton Stadium, where the Princeton Tigers have played their home games since 1998.

This is a list of seasons completed by the Princeton Tigers football team of the National Collegiate Athletic Association (NCAA) Division I Football Championship Subdivision (FCS). Since the team's creation in 1869 and competition in the first college football game, Princeton has played more than 1,200 officially sanctioned games, holding an all-time record of 863–430–50. Princeton originally competed as a football independent but joined the Ivy League as a founding member in 1956. The Tigers claim 28 national championships from official NCAA-designated major selectors and 12 Ivy conference championships.

== Seasons ==
Year	Coach	Overall	Conference	Standing	Bowl/playoffs	Coaches^{#}	AP^{°}
Independent (1869–1895)
1869	No coach	1–1					
1870	No coach	1–0					
1871	No team	(Note: In 1871, Princeton College only played games versus Princeton Theological Seminary and there are no records of those games. No intercollegiate football games occurred that year.)					
1872	No coach	1–0					
1873	No coach	1–0					
1874	No coach	2–0					
1875	No coach	2–0					
1876	No coach	3–2					
1877	No coach	2–0–1					
1878	No coach	6–0					
1879	No coach	4–0–1					
1880	No coach	4–0–1					
1881	No coach	7–0–2					
1882	No coach	7–2					
1883	No coach	7–1					
1884	No coach	9–0–1					
1885	No coach	9–0					
1886	No coach	7–0–1					
1887	No coach	7–2					
1888	No coach	11–1					
1889	No coach	10–0					
1890	No coach	11–1–1					
1891	No coach	12–1					
1892	No coach	12–2					
1893	No coach	11–0					
1894	No coach	8–2					
1895	No coach	10–1–1					
Franklin Morse (Independent) (1896)
1896	Franklin Morse	10–0–1					
Independent (1897–1900)
1897	No coach	10–1					
1898	No coach	11–0–1					
1899	No coach	12–1					
1900	No coach	8–3					
Langdon Lea (Independent) (1901)
1901	Langdon Lea	9–1–1					
Garrett Cochran (Independent) (1902)
1902	Garrett Cochran	8–1					
Art Hillebrand (Independent) (1903–1905)
1903	Art Hillebrand	11–0					
1904	Art Hillebrand	8–2					
1905	Art Hillebrand	8–2					
Bill Roper (Independent) (1906–1908)
1906	Bill Roper	9–0–1					
1907	Bill Roper	7–2					
1908	Bill Roper	5–2–3					
Jim McCormick (Independent) (1909)
1909	Jim McCormick	6–2–1					
Bill Roper (Independent) (1910–1911)
1910	Bill Roper	7–1					
1911	Bill Roper	8–0–2					
Logan Cunningham (Independent) (1912)
1912	Logan Cunningham	7–1–1					
Walter G. Andrews (Independent) (1913)
1913	Walter G. Andrews	5–2–1					
Wilder Penfield (Independent) (1914)
1914	Wilder Penfield	5–2–1					
John H. Rush (Independent) (1915–1918)
1915	John H. Rush	6–2					
1916	John H. Rush	6–2					
1917	John H. Rush	2–0					
1918	John H. Rush	3–0					
Bill Roper (Independent) (1919–1930)
1919	Bill Roper	4–2–1					
1920	Bill Roper	6–0–1					
1921	Bill Roper	4–3					
1922	Bill Roper	8–0					
1923	Bill Roper	3–3–1					
1924	Bill Roper	4–2–1					
1925	Bill Roper	5–1–1					
1926	Bill Roper	5–1–1					
1927	Bill Roper	6–1					
1928	Bill Roper	5–1–2					
1929	Bill Roper	2–4–1					
1930	Bill Roper	1–5–1					
Albert Wittmer (Independent) (1931)
1931	Albert Wittmer	1–7					
Fritz Crisler (Independent) (1932–1937)
1932	Fritz Crisler	2–2–3					
1933	Fritz Crisler	9–0					
1934	Fritz Crisler	7–1					
1935	Fritz Crisler	9–0					
1936	Fritz Crisler	4–2–2					
1937	Fritz Crisler	4–4					
Tad Wieman (Independent) (1938–1942)
1938	Tad Wieman	3–4–1					
1939	Tad Wieman	7–1					
1940	Tad Wieman	5–2–1					
1941	Tad Wieman	2–6					
1942	Tad Wieman	3–5–1					
Harry Mahnken (Independent) (1943–1944)
1943	Harry Mahnken	1–6					
1944	Harry Mahnken	1–2					
Charlie Caldwell (Independent) (1945–1955)
1945	Charlie Caldwell	2–3–2					
1946	Charlie Caldwell	3–5					
1947	Charlie Caldwell	5–3					
1948	Charlie Caldwell	4–4					
1949	Charlie Caldwell	6–3					18
1950	Charlie Caldwell	9–0				8	6
1951	Charlie Caldwell	9–0				6	6
1952	Charlie Caldwell	8–1				14	19
1953	Charlie Caldwell	5–4					
1954	Charlie Caldwell	5–3–1					
1955	Charlie Caldwell	7–2					
Charlie Caldwell (Ivy League) (1956)
1956	Charlie Caldwell	7–2	5–2	2nd			
Dick Colman (Ivy League) (1957–1968)
1957	Dick Colman	7–2	6–1	1st			
1958	Dick Colman	6–3	5–2	T–2nd			
1959	Dick Colman	4–5	3–4	T–5th			
1960	Dick Colman	7–2	6–1	2nd			
1961	Dick Colman	5–4	5–2	T–3rd			
1962	Dick Colman	5–4	4–3	T–3rd			
1963	Dick Colman	7–2	5–2	T–1st			
1964	Dick Colman	9–0	7–0	1st		13	
1965	Dick Colman	8–1	6–1	2nd			
1966	Dick Colman	7–2	6–1	T–1st			
1967	Dick Colman	6–3	4–3	T–1st			
1968	Dick Colman	4–5	4–3	4th			
Jake McCandless (Ivy League) (1969–1972)
1969	Jake McCandless	6–3	6–1	T–1st			
1970	Jake McCandless	5–4	3–4	5th			
1971	Jake McCandless	4–5	3–4	T–5th			
1972	Jake McCandless	3–5–1	2–4–1	T–6th			
Bob Casciola (Ivy League) (1973–1977)
1973	Bob Casciola	1–8	0–7	8th			
1974	Bob Casciola	4–4–1	3–4	T–5th			
1975	Bob Casciola	4–5	3–4	5th			
1976	Bob Casciola	2–7	2–5	T–5th			
1977	Bob Casciola	3–6	3–4	6th			
Frank Navarro (Ivy League) (1978–1984)
1978	Frank Navarro	2–5–2	1–4–2	7th			
1979	Frank Navarro	5–4	5–2	T–2nd			
1980	Frank Navarro	6–4	4–3	T–3rd			
1981	Frank Navarro	5–4–1	5–1–1	3rd			
1982	Frank Navarro	3–7	3–4	4th			
1983	Frank Navarro	4–6	2–5	6th			
1984	Frank Navarro	4–5	3–4	5th			
Ron Rogerson (Ivy League) (1985–1986)
1985	Ron Rogerson	5–5	5–2	T–2nd			
1986	Ron Rogerson	2–8	2–5	T–6th			
Steve Tosches (Ivy League) (1987–1999)
1987	Steve Tosches	6–4	4–3	T–4th			
1988	Steve Tosches	6–4	4–3	T–3rd			
1989	Steve Tosches	7–2–1	6–1				
1990	Steve Tosches	3–7	2–5	T–6th			
1991	Steve Tosches	8–2	5–2	2nd			
1992	Steve Tosches	8–2	6–1	T–1st			
1993	Steve Tosches	8–2	5–2	3rd			
1994	Steve Tosches	7–3	4–3	T–2nd			
1995	Steve Tosches	8–1–1	5–1–1	1st			
1996	Steve Tosches	3–7	2–5	T–6th			
1997	Steve Tosches	5–5 (Note: Penn forfeited a conference win over Princeton due to the use of ineligible players, leading to an official record of 6–4 (3–4).)	2–5	T–6th			
1998	Steve Tosches	5–5	4–3	4th			
1999	Steve Tosches	3–7	1–6	T–7th			
Roger Hughes (Ivy League) (2000–2009)
2000	Roger Hughes	3–7	3–4	5th			
2001	Roger Hughes	3–6	3–4	T–4th			
2002	Roger Hughes	6–4	4–3	T–3rd			
2003	Roger Hughes	2–8	2–5	7th			
2004	Roger Hughes	5–5	3–4	T–4th			
2005	Roger Hughes	7–3	5–2	T–2nd			
2006	Roger Hughes	9–1	6–1	T–1st			18
2007	Roger Hughes	4–6	3–4	T–4th			
2008	Roger Hughes	4–6	3–4	5th			
2009	Roger Hughes	4–6	3–4	T–4th			
Bob Surace (Ivy League) (2010–present)
2010	Bob Surace	1–9	0–7	8th			
2011	Bob Surace	1–9	1–6	T–7th			
2012	Bob Surace	5–5	4–3	T–3rd			
2013	Bob Surace	8–2	6–1	T–1st			
2014	Bob Surace	5–5	4–3	4th			
2015	Bob Surace	5–5	2–5	6th			
2016	Bob Surace	8–2	6–1	T–1st			
2017	Bob Surace	5–5	2–5	7th			
2018	Bob Surace	10–0	7–0	1st		9	11
2019	Bob Surace	8–2	5–2	3rd			
2020	No team (Note: Princeton did not compete during the 2020 season as a result of the COVID-19 pandemic and the subsequent cancellation of the Ivy League season.)						
2021	Bob Surace	9–1	6–1	T–1st		21	24
2022	Bob Surace	8–2	5–2	T–2nd			
2023	Bob Surace	5–5	4–3	4th			
2024	Bob Surace	3–7	2–5	T–6th			
2025	Bob Surace	3–7	2–5	T–6th			
Total:		863–430–50					
National championship Conference title Conference division title or championship game berth
^{†}Indicates Bowl Coalition, Bowl Alliance, BCS, or CFP / New Years' Six bowl.; ^{#}Rankings from final Coaches Poll.

== See also ==
- List of Ivy League football standings
