= 1872 in sports =

1872 in sports describes the year's events in world sport.

== American football ==
College championship

- College football national championship – Princeton Tigers

Events

- Five teams compete in the 1872 college football season: Columbia, Rutgers, Princeton, Stevens Tech and Yale.

== Association football ==
International

- 30 November — Scotland v. England in Glasgow is the first–ever official football international. The match is a goalless draw.

England

- 16 March — inaugural FA Cup final. The Wanderers 1–0 Royal Engineers at Kennington Oval in London. The goal is scored by Morton Betts. In its way, this first final marks the beginning of major competitive football.
- The FA rules that the ball must have a circumference of between 68 cm and 71 cm. It must be spherical and must consist of an India rubber bladder enclosed within a casing made of leather or another approved material. Also, the ball must weigh at least 396 grams but no more than 453 grams. The prescribed weight is interesting because leather balls will become notorious for gaining weight when wet: the weight can almost double if the ball gets really soaked.

Scotland

- February — Rangers F.C. is formed in Glasgow by four friends. The team's first pitch is on common land at Flesher's Haugh, Glasgow Green.

== Aussie Rules Football ==
- Essendon Football Club was founded in Victoria, Australia.

== Baseball ==
National championship

- National Association of Professional Base Ball Players champion – Boston Red Stockings

Events

- The National Association (NA) permits pitching with a wrist snap, practically legalising the New York Mutuals.
- Multiple NABBP champions Eckford and Atlantic from Brooklyn, New York join the NA but neither will regain prominence.
- The original Boston Red Stockings win the NA pennant, beginning a four-year run

== Boxing ==
Events

- No fights of note take place in 1872. American Champion Mike McCoole and his challengers are inactive.

== Canadian Football ==
- Montreal Football Club is founded on April 8th.

== Cricket ==
Events

- An experiment takes place at Lord's to study the effects of covering the pitch before the start of a match, the first time this is known to have been tried.

England

- Most runs – W. G. Grace 1,485 @ 57.11 (HS 170*)
- Most wickets – James Southerton 169 @ 13.07 (BB 8–20)

== Golf ==
Major tournaments

- British Open – Tom Morris junior

== Horse racing ==
England

- Grand National – Casse Tete
- 1,000 Guineas Stakes – Reine
- 2,000 Guineas Stakes – Prince Charlie
- The Derby – Cremorne
- The Oaks – Reine
- St. Leger Stakes – Wenlock

Australia

- Melbourne Cup – The Quack

Canada

- Queen's Plate – Fearnaught

Ireland

- Irish Grand National – Scots Grey
- Irish Derby Stakes – Trickstress

USA

- Belmont Stakes – Joe Daniels

== Rowing ==
The Boat Race

- 23 March — Cambridge wins the 29th Oxford and Cambridge Boat Race

== Rugby football ==
Events

- Wigan RLFC founded

== Bibliography ==
- Rowland Bowen, Cricket: A History of its Growth and Development, Eyre & Spottiswoode, 1970
