= National Championship Foundation =

American college football history organization

The National Championship Foundation (NCF) was established by Mike Riter of Hudson, New York. The NCF retroactively selected college football national champions for each year from 1869 to 1979, and its selections are among the historic national champions recognized by the National Collegiate Athletic Association (NCAA) in its Football Bowl Subdivision record book.

== Champions ==
The following list identifies the college football national champions as selected by the National Championship Foundation.

Season	Champion(s)	Record	Coach
1869	Princeton	1–1	
1870	Princeton	1–0	
1871	None	No games played	
1872	Princeton	1–0	
1873	Princeton	2–0	
1874	Yale	3–0	
1875	Harvard	4–0	
1876	Yale	3–0	
1877	Yale	3–0–1	
1878	Princeton	6–0	
1879	Princeton	4–0–1	
1880	Princeton; Yale	4–0–1; 4–0–1	
1881	Yale	5–0–1	
1882	Yale	8–0	
1883	Yale	9–0	
1884	Yale	8–0–1	
1885	Princeton	9–0	
1886	Yale	9–0–1	
1887	Yale	9–0	
1888	Yale	13–0	Walter Camp
1889	Princeton	10–0	
1890	Harvard	11–0	George C. Adams, George A. Stewart
1891	Yale	13–0	Walter Camp
1892	Yale	13–0	Walter Camp
1893	Princeton	11–0	
1894	Yale	16–0	William Rhodes
1895	Penn	14–0	George Washington Woodruff
1896	Lafayette; Princeton	11–0–1; 10–0–1	Parke H. Davis
1897	Penn	15–0	George Washington Woodruff
1898	Harvard	11–0	William Cameron Forbes
1899	Harvard	10–0–1	Benjamin Dibblee
1900	Yale	12–0	Malcolm McBride
1901	Michigan	11–0	Fielding H. Yost
1902	Michigan	11–0	Fielding H. Yost
1903	Michigan; Princeton	11–0–1; 11–0	Fielding H. Yost; Art Hillebrand
1904	Michigan; Penn	10–0; 12–0	Fielding H. Yost; Carl S. Williams
1905	Chicago	10–0	Amos Alonzo Stagg
1906	Princeton	9–0–1	William Roper
1907	Yale	9–0–1	William F. Knox
1908	LSU; Penn	10–0; 11–0–1	Edgar Wingard; Sol Metzger
1909	Yale	10–0	Howard Jones
1910	Harvard; Pittsburgh	8–0–1; 9–0	Percy Haughton; Joseph H. Thompson
1911	Penn State; Princeton	8–0–1; 8–0–2	Bill Hollenback; William Roper
1912	Harvard; Penn State	9–0; 8–0	Percy Haughton; Bill Hollenback
1913	Harvard	9–0	Percy Haughton
1914	Army	9–0	Charles Daly
1915	Cornell	9–0	Albert Sharpe
1916	Pittsburgh	8–0	Glenn "Pop" Warner
1917	Georgia Tech	9–0	John Heisman
1918	Michigan; Pittsburgh	5–0; 4–1	Fielding H. Yost; Glenn "Pop" Warner
1919	Harvard; Notre Dame; Texas A&M	9–0–1; 9–0; 10–0	Bob Fisher; Knute Rockne; Dana X. Bible
1920	California	9–0	Andy Smith
1921	Cornell	8–0	Gil Dobie
1922	California; Princeton	9–0; 8–0	Andy Smith; William Roper
1923	Illinois; Michigan	8–0; 8–0	Robert Zuppke; Fielding H. Yost
1924	Notre Dame	10–0	Knute Rockne
1925	Alabama	10–0	Wallace Wade
1926	Alabama; Stanford	9–0–1; 10–0–1	Wallace Wade; Glenn "Pop" Warner
1927	Illinois	7–0–1	Robert Zuppke
1928	Georgia Tech	10–0	William Alexander
1929	Notre Dame	9–0	Knute Rockne
1930	Notre Dame	10–0	Knute Rockne
1931	USC	10–1	Howard Jones
1932	USC	10–0	Howard Jones
1933	Michigan	7–0–1	Harry Kipke
1934	Minnesota	8–0	Bernie Bierman
1935	Minnesota	8–0	Bernie Bierman
1936	Minnesota	7–1	Bernie Bierman
1937	Pittsburgh	9–0–1	Jock Sutherland
1938	TCU	11–0	Dutch Meyer
1939	Texas A&M	11–0	Homer Norton
1940	Minnesota	8–0	Bernie Bierman
1941	Minnesota	8–0	Bernie Bierman
1942	Ohio State	9–1	Paul Brown
1943	Notre Dame	9–1	Frank Leahy
1944	Army; Ohio State	9–0; 9–0	Earl Blaik; Carroll Widdoes
1945	Alabama; Army	10–0; 9–0	Frank Thomas; Earl Blaik
1946	Notre Dame	8–0–1	Frank Leahy
1947	Michigan	10–0	Fritz Crisler
1948	Michigan	9–0	Bennie Oosterbaan
1949	Notre Dame	10–0	Frank Leahy
1950	Tennessee	11–1	Robert Neyland
1951	Maryland	10–0	Jim Tatum
1952	Michigan State	9–0	Biggie Munn
1953	Notre Dame	9–0–1	Frank Leahy
1954	Ohio State; UCLA	10–0; 9–0	Woody Hayes; Henry Sanders
1955	Oklahoma	11–0	Bud Wilkinson
1956	Oklahoma	10–0	Bud Wilkinson
1957	Auburn	10–0	Ralph Jordan
1958	LSU	11–0	Paul Dietzel
1959	Syracuse	11–0	Ben Schwartzwalder
1960	Ole Miss	10–0–1	Johnny Vaught
1961	Alabama	11–0	Paul "Bear" Bryant
1962	USC	11–0	John McKay
1963	Texas	11–0	Darrell Royal
1964	Arkansas	11–0	Frank Broyles
1965	Alabama	9–1–1	Paul "Bear" Bryant
1966	Notre Dame	9–0–1	Ara Parseghian
1967	USC	10–1	John McKay
1968	Ohio State	10–0	Woody Hayes
1969	Texas	11–0	Darrell Royal
1970	Nebraska	11–0–1	Bob Devaney
1971	Nebraska	13–0	Bob Devaney
1972	USC	12–0	John McKay
1973	Michigan; Notre Dame; Ohio State	10–0–1; 11–0; 10–0–1	Bo Schembechler; Ara Parseghian; Woody Hayes
1974	Oklahoma; USC	11–0; 10–1–1	Barry Switzer; John McKay
1975	Arizona State; Oklahoma	12–0; 11–1	Frank Kush; Barry Switzer
1976	Pittsburgh	12–0	Johnny Majors
1977	Notre Dame	11–1	Dan Devine
1978	Alabama; USC	11–1; 12–1	Paul "Bear" Bryant; John Robinson
1979	Alabama	12–0	Paul "Bear" Bryant
1980	Georgia	12–0	Vince Dooley
1981	Clemson; Nebraska; Pittsburgh; SMU; Texas	12–0; 9–3; 11–1; 10–1; 10–1–1	Danny Ford; Tom Osborne; Jackie Sherrill; Ron Meyer; Fred Akers
1982	Penn State	11–1	Joe Paterno
1983	Miami (FL)	11–1	Howard Schnellenberger
1984	BYU; Washington	13–0; 11–1	LaVell Edwards; Don James
1985	Oklahoma	11–1	Barry Switzer
1986	Penn State	12–0	Joe Paterno
1987	Miami (FL)	12–0	Jimmy Johnson
1988	Notre Dame	12–0	Lou Holtz
1989	Miami (FL)	11–1	Dennis Erickson
1990	Colorado; Georgia Tech	11–1–1; 11–0–1	Bill McCartney; Bobby Ross
1991	Miami (FL); Washington	12–0; 12–0	Dennis Erickson; Don James
1992	Alabama	13–0	Gene Stallings
1993	Auburn; Florida State; Nebraska; Notre Dame	11–0; 12–1; 11–1; 11–1	Terry Bowden; Bobby Bowden; Tom Osborne; Lou Holtz
1994	Nebraska; Penn State	13–0; 12–0	Tom Osborne; Joe Paterno
1995	Nebraska	12–0	Tom Osborne
1996	Florida	12–1	Steve Spurrier
1997	Michigan; Nebraska	12–0; 13–0	Lloyd Carr; Tom Osborne
1998	Tennessee	13–0	Phillip Fulmer
1999	Florida State	12–0	Bobby Bowden
2000	Oklahoma	13–0	Bob Stoops

== See also ==
- NCAA Division I FBS national football championship
