= Claudius Rockefeller =

American football player (1849–1918)

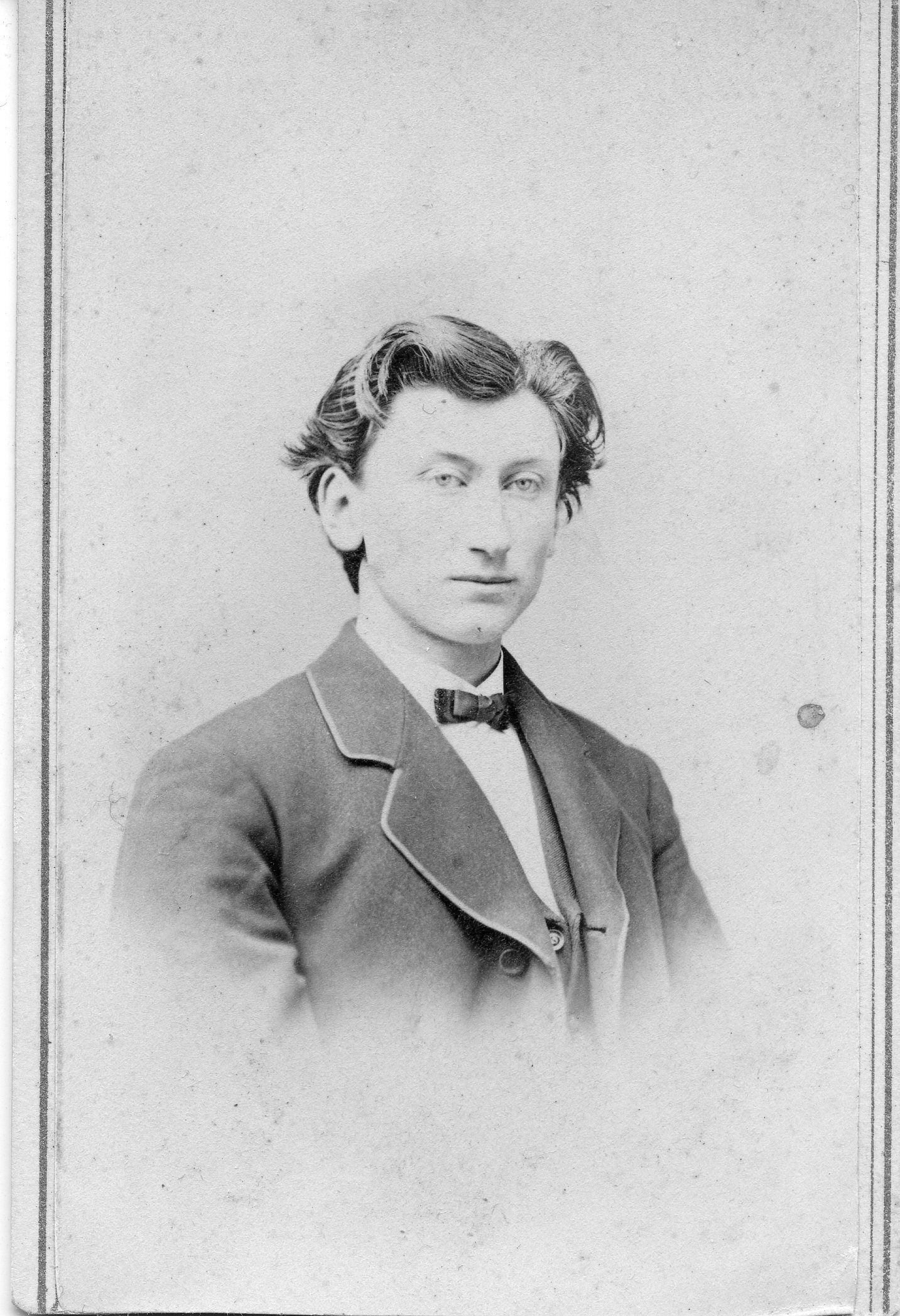

Personal information
- Born: September 4, 1849; Germantown, Columbia County, New York, U.S.
- Died: February 1, 1918 (aged 68); Hudson, Columbia County, New York, U.S.

Claudius Rockefeller (September 4, 1849 - February 1, 1918) was an American college football player and prominent lawyer. He was a member of the Rutgers team in the first ever college football game and Captain of the 1872 Rutgers Queensmen football team. He was a member of the renowned Rockefeller family.

== Early life and education ==
Rockefeller was born on September 4, 1849 in Germantown, Columbia County, New York. He was the son of Phillip Herman Rockefeller and Elizabeth Miller. He received his early education at Riverside Seminary. The Riverside Seminary was later called the Mountain View House, a resort hotel, and was built by his father in the early 1860s. The first meeting of the Rockefeller Family Association was held there in 1905.

He graduated from Rutgers College in 1873 and from Albany Law School in 1876. While at Rutgers University, he was awarded a prize by the Philoclean Society for freshman declamation; was elected to the Phi Beta Kappa Honor Society; was a member of the Delta Upsilon Fraternity; won the Myron W. Smith Oratory prize; and won the Bradley Prize in mathematics. He was also the commencement speaker at his graduation from Rutgers University in 1873 and from Albany Law School 1876.

He played in the first ever college football game as a member of the 1869 Rutgers team, against Princeton University (the College of New Jersey at the time). He was the captain of the 1872 Rutgers Queensmen football team. The 1872 college football season also featured another first in the game, as Rockefeller captained the Rutgers team in the first ever collegiate football game in New York against the Columbia University Lions, and also featured the first ever tied game in college football.

In addition to playing college football, Rockefeller was the "stroke" on the Rutgers crew team (known then as the Rutgers Boating Association) and was considered the bester rower on the Rutgers crew team. In 1870, in a race against the Harvard crew team, in Rutgers' first-ever intercollegiate rowing race, Rockefeller was sick and had to be replaced by another student, William J. Leggett, who was also the Rutgers football captain for the 1869 and 1870 seasons. The Lawrence Boat Club of the Harvard Scientific School, the amateur rowing champions, issued the challenge to Rutgers and the race took place on June 20, 1870.

== Career ==
Before entering the Albany Law School, Rockefeller studied in the law offices of Gaul & Esselstyn. He was admitted to the bar on May 8, 1876. Immediately upon his graduation from the law school he began practice, forming a partnership with Ezra Doane DeLamater, another member of the Rutgers football team, which continued until 1885. From that date he practiced alone until 1899, when another law firm was formed with himself and W. Frank Holsapple. This partnership continued until after the death of Mr. Holsapple, at which time he became a solo attorney. In 1889, he was appointed as the City Recorder for Hudson, New York, which position he held for two years. From 1881 to 1885, Rockefeller was Deputy Collector of the United States Internal Revenue Service under President Grover Cleveland. He was also a professor at the Hudson Institute.

=== Memberships and Board work ===
He was a member of the Hudson Board of Education from 1892 to 1894, serving as the president of the board the latter two years. On his retirement from this board he was succeeded by his wife. He was also a commissioner of one of the Ashokan condemnation boards for New York city, being appointed by Justice Betts. He was a Trustee of the Hudson Building and Loan Association and one of the first Trustees and Treasurer of Hudson City Hospital. He was the Secretary and Treasurer of the Board in the first Board meeting of the hospital, in 1889, when the hospital was first established. He held those positions in later years as well. In 1914, he was the Treasurer of the Columbia County Agency for Dependent Children and the Columbia County Committee of the States Aids Association.

== Personal life ==
He was married, on June 4, 1879, to Lucinda Van Ness and they had two children, Harold Rockefeller and Sherman Van Ness Rockefeller.

He was the co-editor of the "Transactions of the Rockefeller Family Association" in 1910 and 1915. He was President of the Rockefeller Family Association in 1907, the third ever president of the Association. On September 2, 1908, he hosted the fourth ever meeting of the Rockefeller Family Association, in Albany, New York.

Rockefeller died on February 1, 1918 in Hudson, Columbia County, New York.

== Publications ==
- Transactions of the Rockefeller Family Association for the Years 1905-1909 Rockefeller family association; Rockefeller, Henry Oscar; Rockefeller, Benjamin Franklin; Rockefeller, Claudius (1910). University of Wisconsin - Madison. New York, The Knickerbocker Press.
- The Transactions of the Rockefeller Family Association for the Years 1910 -1914Rockefeller, Henry Oscar; Rockefeller, Benjamin Franklin; Rockefeller, Claudius (1915). University of Wisconsin - Madison. New York, The Knickerbocker Press.
