= 1871 in sports =

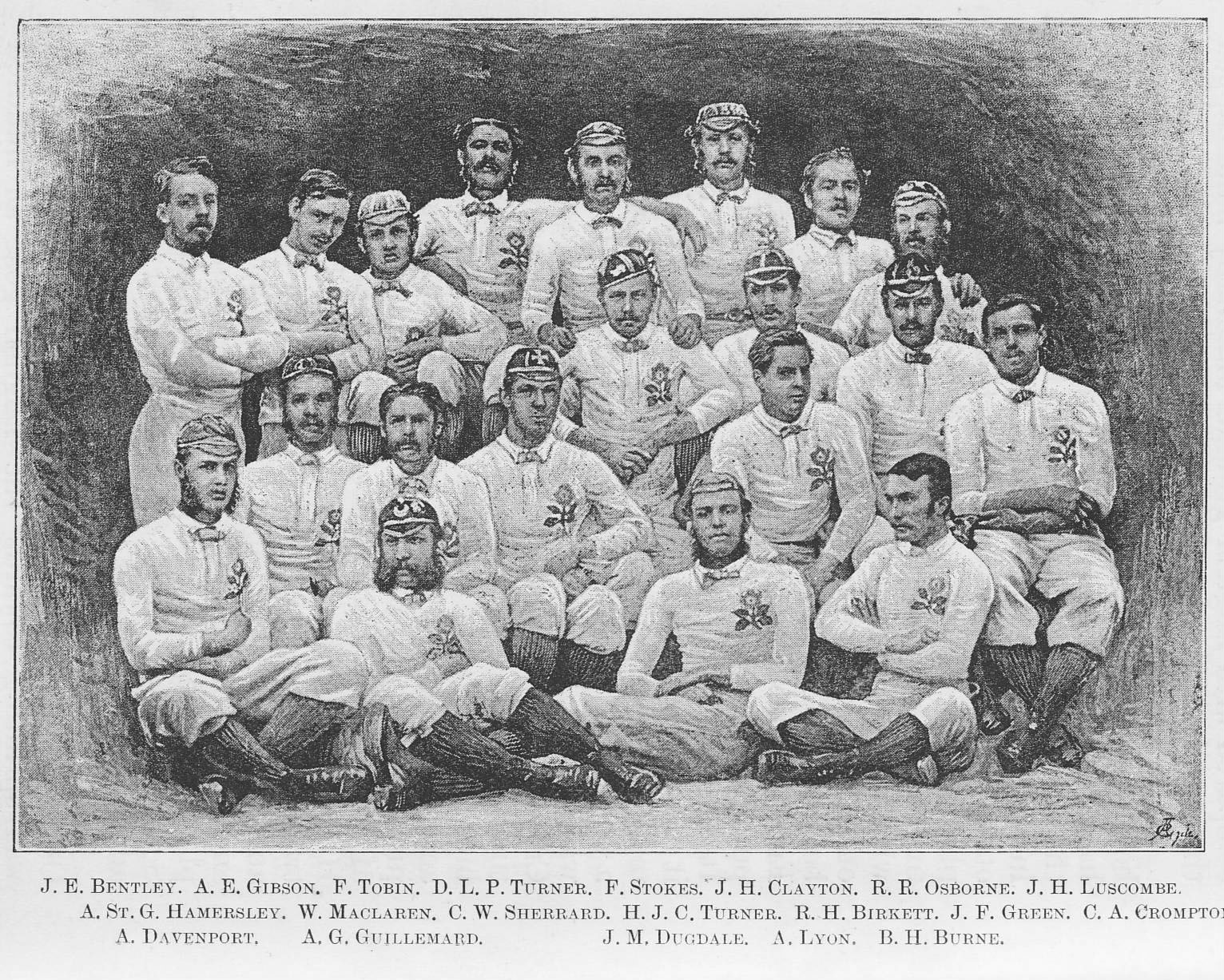
The England national rugby team that played the 1st international vs Scotland in Edinburgh. Scotland won by 1 goal & 1 try to 1 try.

1871 in sports describes the year's events in world sport.

== American football ==
College championship

- College football national championship – none

Events

- The 1871 college football season is the only one since the first season in 1869 until the present day that no games are played in the entire season. Thus 1871 is the only year since play began in which no college football national champion can be named, retrospectively or otherwise.

== Association football ==
England

- Inaugural FA Cup competition begins with four matches played on 11 November. The 15 clubs entering the competition are all amateur and mainly from the London area: Barnes, Civil Service, Clapham Rovers, Crystal Palace (1861), Donnington School, Hampstead Heathens, Harrow Chequers, Hitchin, Maidenhead, Marlow, Reigate, Priory, Royal Engineers, Upton Park, The Wanderers and Queen's Park (Glasgow).

The Wanderers win the Cup on 16 March 1872.

== Baseball ==
National championship

- National Association of Professional Base Ball Players champion – Philadelphia Athletics

Events

- March — ten NABBP clubs found the National Association of Professional Base Ball Players, the first professional sports league. (Today it is commonly considered the first major league and usually called simply the "National Association" or "NA".) Thirty-three clubs establish a parallel amateur NAABBP that withers away.
- There are nine NA teams in the field and Athletic of Philadelphia wins the championship in the final game, 30 October.

== Boxing ==
Events

- With the main American Championship title claimant Mike McCoole inactive this year, attention focuses on two fights between Jem Mace and Joe Coburn. Both fights are drawn and Mace continues to state his claim to the American Championship. However, having suffered a hand injury in his second fight with Coburn, Mace relinquishes all his title claims and returns to exhibition boxing.
- McCoole is now generally regarded as the champion by default, his main challenger being Tom Allen who was defeated by McCoole in 1869.

== Cricket ==
Events

- Derbyshire plays its inaugural first-class match v. Lancashire at Old Trafford on 26 & 27 May.

England

- Most runs – W. G. Grace 2,739 @ 78.25 (HS 268), a staggering feat on the pitches of the time. Richard Daft has the next highest average among batsmen playing 10 innings or more, with 37.66, less than half of Grace's figure. Harry Jupp has the next highest runs aggregate, with 1,068. Grace makes ten centuries in the season, while no other player can manage more than one.
- Most wickets – James Southerton 151 @ 15.72 (BB 8–63)

== Gaelic football ==
- During the 1860s and 1870s, rugby and association football have started to become popular in Ireland. According to Gaelic football historian Jack Mahon, caid has begun to give way to a "rough-and-tumble game" which even allows tripping.
- County Limerick is the stronghold of the native game around this time and the Commercials Club, founded by employees of Cannock's Drapery Store, is one of the first to impose a set of rules that is later adopted by other clubs in the county.

== Golf ==
Major tournaments

- British Open – no competition.
- The Open has been administered since 1860 by Prestwick Golf Club but controversy prevents the tournament being held in 1871, the only exception outside the two World Wars. Finally it is agreed that Prestwick will henceforth organise the tournament jointly with The Royal and Ancient Golf Club of St Andrews and The Honourable Company of Edinburgh Golfers.

== Horse racing ==
England

- Grand National – The Lamb (second win, having also won in 1868)
- 1,000 Guineas Stakes – Hannah
- 2,000 Guineas Stakes – Bothwell
- The Derby – Favonius
- The Oaks – Hannah
- St. Leger Stakes – Hannah

Australia

- Melbourne Cup – The Pearl

Canada

- Queen's Plate – Floss

Ireland

- Irish Grand National – The Doe
- Irish Derby Stakes – Maid of Athens

USA

- Belmont Stakes – Harry Bassett

== Rowing ==
The Boat Race

- 1 April — Cambridge wins the 28th Oxford and Cambridge Boat Race

Other

- There is no Harvard–Yale Regatta. From the third Race in 1859, the only exceptions outside major wars are 1871 and 1896.

== Rugby football ==
Events

- 26 January — the Rugby Football Union (RFU) is founded at the Pall Mall Restaurant, which is situated near Trafalgar Square at 1 Cockspur Street, London. The formation of the RFU establishes the "handling game" as a different sport to the "dribbling game" that is increasingly being played under the auspices of the Football Association.
- 21 clubs are represented at the meeting: Blackheath, Richmond, Ravenscourt Park, West Kent, Marlborough Nomads, Wimbledon Hornets, Gipsies, Civil Service, Law Club, Wellington College, Guy's Hospital, Flamingoes, Clapham Rovers, Harlequins, King's College, St Paul's School, Queen's House, Lausanne, Addison, Mohicans, Belsize Park. Algernon Rutter of Richmond is elected the first president. A committee is selected to produce a definitive national set of Rugby Football laws.
- 27 March — the first ever official international fixture in any kind of football takes place with a rugby football game between Scotland and England. Scotland (i.e., Scottish members of the RFU) defeats England (i.e., English members of the RFU) by 1 goal & 1 try to 1 try at Raeburn Place in Edinburgh. The match is played by teams of 20–a–side and the game lasts for 50 minutes each way.
- Foundation of Worcester RFC

== Yacht racing ==
America's Cup

- The New York Yacht Club retains the America's Cup as Columbia and its substitute Sappho defeat British challenger Livonia of the Royal Harwich Yacht Club.
