= Billingsley Report =

College football rating system

The Billingsley Report is a college football rating system developed in the late 1960s to determine a national champion. Billingsley has actively rated college football teams on a current basis since 1970. Beginning in 1999, Billingsley's ratings were included as one of seven mathematical formulas included in the Bowl Championship Series (BCS) rankings.

Unlike the other mathematical formulas included in the BCS rankings, the Billingsley Report was not prepared by a trained mathematician or statistician. Instead, the Billingsley Report is prepared by Richard Billingsley (born c. 1951), a lifelong college football fan in Hugo, Oklahoma. Billingsley attended Texas Bible College, became a minister and later a consultant in the country music business. He began preparing his own weekly college football ratings as a hobby.

Billingsley has also applied his ratings methodology retroactively to select national champions for each year from 1869 to 1870 and from 1872 to 1969. Since 1996, the "Billingsley Report" has been one of the selectors of historic national champions recognized by the National Collegiate Athletic Association (NCAA) in its Football Bowl Subdivision record book.

The NCAA describes Billingsley's methodology as follows: " The main feature of his system is the inclusion of a unique rule for head-to-head competition, with the overall system consisting of a balanced approach to wins, losses, strength of schedule, and home-field advantage. A slight weight is given to most recent performance. The Billingsley formula does not use margin of victory, however, the Billingsley MOV formula does include margin of victory in the calculations.". Analysis shows that Billingsley's ranking system typically strongly disagrees with other computer ranking systems and more closely resembles human ranking schemes, likely due to the ad hoc and often self-conflicting nature of Billingsley's many ratings adjustments, such as weighting later season games as more important than early season games, adjusting win values by stadium attendance, forcing head to head victors to be ranked above their defeated opponents (but only until their next game), and discounting the value of wins by teams with more losses.

Richard Billingsley is also the owner of the College Football Research Center.

== National champions ==
Billingsley Report selections first appeared in the 1995 edition of the NCAA records book, listing champions since 1960. In the 1996 book these champions were joined with retrospective selections all the way back to 1869. This original set of champions was last printed in the 1999 NCAA records book.

In 1998 Billingsley adjusted his formula in order to participate as a computer poll in the Bowl Championship Series rankings. He re-ranked all past seasons with this new formula; these new champions were printed in the 2000–2003 NCAA records books.

Prior to the 2001 season, Billingsley again changed the formula in order to remove "Margin of Victory" from the system's BCS calculations. This third set of champions appeared in the 2004–2012 NCAA books.

Finally, beginning in 2013, the NCAA records books profess to list both Billingsley's "No Margin of Victory" and "Margin of Victory" champions in cases where they differ. However, this list is not a simple superset of the previous two sets of champions.

The table below lists the 4 distinct sets of Billingsley Report national champions printed in NCAA records books since 1995. The selections are additionally sourced to the College Football Research Center website, where Billingsley made the same updates to his national champions after each change to the Billingsley Report formula.

	Original formula	BCS (Margin of Victory)	BCS (No Margin of Victory)	Billingsley & Billingsley MOV
BCS	—	1999–2000	2001–2013	—
CFRC	1997	1998–2001	2001–2010	2011–2020
NCAA	1995, 1996–1999	2000–2003	2004–2012	2013–2022
Season	Billingsley Report National Champions			
1869	Princeton	Princeton	Princeton	Princeton
1870	Princeton	Princeton	Princeton	Princeton
1871	—	—	—	—
1872	Princeton	Princeton	Princeton	Princeton
1873	Princeton	Princeton	Princeton	Princeton
1874	Princeton	Princeton	Princeton	Princeton
1875	Princeton	Princeton	Princeton	Princeton
1876	Yale	Yale	Yale	Yale
1877	Yale	Yale	Princeton	Princeton
1878	Princeton	Princeton	Princeton	Princeton
1879	Princeton	Princeton	Princeton	Princeton
1880	Yale	Yale	Yale	Yale
1881	Princeton	Princeton	Princeton	Princeton
1882	Yale	Yale	Yale	Yale
1883	Yale	Yale	Yale	Yale
1884	Yale	Yale	Princeton	Princeton
1885	Princeton	Princeton	Princeton	Princeton
1886	Yale	Yale	Princeton	Princeton
1887	Yale	Yale	Yale	Yale
1888	Yale	Yale	Yale	Yale
1889	Princeton	Princeton	Princeton	Princeton
1890	Harvard	Harvard	Harvard	Harvard
1891	Yale	Yale	Yale	Yale
1892	Yale	Yale	Yale	Yale
1893	Princeton	Princeton	Princeton	Princeton
1894	Yale	Yale	Yale	Yale
1895	Penn	Penn	Penn	Penn
1896	Princeton	Princeton	Princeton	Princeton
1897	Penn	Penn	Penn	Penn
1898	Harvard	Harvard	Harvard	Harvard
1899	Harvard	Harvard	Princeton	Princeton
1900	Yale	Yale	Yale	Yale
1901	Michigan	Harvard	Harvard	Harvard
1902	Michigan	Michigan	Michigan	Michigan
1903	Michigan	Michigan	Princeton	Princeton
1904	Michigan	Michigan	Minnesota†	Minnesota†
1905	Chicago	Chicago	Chicago	Chicago
1906	Vanderbilt†	Vanderbilt†	Yale	Yale
1907	Penn†	Penn†	Yale	Yale
1908	Penn	Penn	Harvard†	Harvard†
1909	Yale	Yale	Yale	Yale
1910	Auburn†	Michigan†	Harvard	Harvard
1911	Vanderbilt†	Vanderbilt†	Princeton	Minnesota†; Princeton (Billingsley MOV)
1912	Wisconsin†	Harvard	Harvard	Harvard
1913	Chicago	Auburn†	Auburn†	Chicago; Auburn (Billingsley MOV)†
1914	Illinois	Illinois	Texas†	Illinois; Texas (Billingsley MOV)†
1915	Nebraska†	Nebraska†	Oklahoma†	Minnesota†; Oklahoma (Billingsley MOV)†
1916	Pittsburgh	Pittsburgh	Pittsburgh	Georgia Tech†; Pittsburgh (Billingsley MOV)
1917	Georgia Tech	Georgia Tech	Georgia Tech	Georgia Tech
1918	Michigan	Michigan	Michigan	Michigan
1919	Illinois	Illinois	Texas A&M	Illinois; Texas A&M (Billingsley MOV)
1920	California	California	Notre Dame	Notre Dame
1921	Iowa	Iowa	California	Iowa; California (Billingsley MOV)
1922	Iowa†	Iowa†	California	Iowa†; California (Billingsley MOV)
1923	Michigan	Michigan	Michigan	Michigan
1924	Notre Dame	Notre Dame	Notre Dame	Notre Dame
1925	Alabama	Alabama	Alabama	Alabama
1926	Alabama	Alabama	Alabama	Alabama
1927	Illinois	Illinois	Illinois	Illinois
1928	Georgia Tech	Georgia Tech	Georgia Tech	Georgia Tech
1929	Notre Dame	Notre Dame	Notre Dame	Notre Dame
1930	Notre Dame	Notre Dame	Notre Dame	Notre Dame
1931	USC	USC	USC	USC
1932	USC	USC	USC	USC
1933	Michigan	Michigan	Michigan	Michigan
1934	Alabama	Minnesota	Minnesota	Minnesota
1935	Minnesota	Minnesota	Minnesota	Minnesota
1936	Minnesota	Minnesota	Minnesota	Minnesota
1937	Pittsburgh	Pittsburgh	Pittsburgh	Pittsburgh
1938	Tennessee	Tennessee	Tennessee	Tennessee
1939	Texas A&M	Cornell	Texas A&M	Texas A&M
1940	Minnesota	Minnesota	Stanford	Stanford
1941	Minnesota	Minnesota	Minnesota	Minnesota
1942	Ohio State	Ohio State	Georgia	Georgia
1943	Notre Dame	Notre Dame	Notre Dame	Notre Dame
1944	Army	Army	Army	Ohio State; Army (Billingsley MOV)
1945	Army	Army	Army	Army
1946	Notre Dame	Notre Dame	Army	Army
1947	Michigan	Michigan	Michigan	Michigan
1948	Michigan	Michigan	Michigan	Michigan
1949	Oklahoma	Notre Dame	Notre Dame	Notre Dame
1950	Tennessee	Tennessee	Tennessee	Tennessee
1951	Maryland	Michigan State	Michigan State	Michigan State
1952	Michigan State	Michigan State	Georgia Tech	Georgia Tech
1953	Notre Dame	Notre Dame	Notre Dame	Notre Dame
1954	UCLA	UCLA	Ohio State	Ohio State
1955	Oklahoma	Oklahoma	Oklahoma	Oklahoma
1956	Oklahoma	Oklahoma	Oklahoma	Oklahoma
1957	Michigan State	Michigan State	Auburn	Auburn
1958	LSU	LSU	LSU	LSU
1959	Ole Miss	Ole Miss	Syracuse	Syracuse
1960	Iowa	Ole Miss	Ole Miss	Ole Miss
1961	Alabama	Alabama	Alabama	Alabama
1962	Alabama†	Alabama†	Ole Miss	Ole Miss
1963	Texas	Texas	Texas	Texas
1964	Arkansas	Arkansas	Arkansas	Arkansas
1965	Alabama	Alabama	Michigan State	Michigan State
1966	Notre Dame	Notre Dame	Notre Dame	Notre Dame
1967	USC	USC	USC	USC
1968	Ohio State	Ohio State	Ohio State	Ohio State
1969	Texas	Texas	Texas	Texas
1970	Nebraska	Nebraska	Nebraska	Nebraska
1971	Nebraska	Nebraska	Nebraska	Nebraska
1972	USC	USC	USC	USC
1973	Oklahoma	Oklahoma	Notre Dame	Notre Dame
1974	Oklahoma	Oklahoma	Oklahoma	Oklahoma
1975	Oklahoma	Oklahoma	Oklahoma	Oklahoma
1976	USC	USC	USC	Pittsburgh; USC (Billingsley MOV)
1977	Notre Dame	Notre Dame	Notre Dame	Notre Dame
1978	Oklahoma	Oklahoma	USC	USC
1979	Alabama	Alabama	Alabama	Alabama
1980	Oklahoma	Oklahoma	Georgia	Georgia
1981	Clemson	Clemson	Clemson	Clemson
1982	Penn State	Penn State	Penn State	Penn State
1983	Miami	Miami	Auburn	Auburn
1984	Florida	Florida	BYU	BYU
1985	Oklahoma	Oklahoma	Oklahoma	Oklahoma
1986	Oklahoma	Penn State	Penn State	Penn State
1987	Miami	Miami	Miami	Miami
1988	Notre Dame	Notre Dame	Notre Dame	Notre Dame
1989	Florida State†	Miami	Miami	Miami
1990	Miami	Miami	Colorado	Colorado
1991	Washington	Washington	Miami	Miami
1992	Alabama	Alabama	Alabama	Alabama
1993	Florida State	Florida State	Florida State	Florida State
1994	Penn State	Nebraska	Nebraska	Nebraska
1995	Nebraska	Nebraska	Nebraska	Nebraska
1996	Florida	Florida	Florida	Florida
1997	Nebraska	Nebraska	Nebraska	Michigan; Nebraska (Billingsley MOV)
1998	Tennessee	Tennessee	Tennessee	Tennessee
1999	—	Florida State	Florida State	Florida State
2000	—	Oklahoma	Oklahoma	Oklahoma
2001	—	Miami	Miami	Miami
2002	—	Ohio State	Ohio State	Ohio State
2003	—	—	LSU	LSU
2004	—	—	USC	USC
2005	—	—	Texas	Texas
2006	—	—	Florida	Florida
2007	—	—	LSU	LSU
2008	—	—	Florida	Florida
2009	—	—	Alabama	Alabama
2010	—	—	Auburn	Auburn
2011	—	—	Alabama	Alabama
2012	—	—	—	Alabama
2013	—	—	—	Florida State
2014	—	—	—	Ohio State
2015	—	—	—	Alabama
2016	—	—	—	Clemson
2017	—	—	—	Alabama
2018	—	—	—	Clemson
2019	—	—	—	LSU
2020	—	—	—	Alabama
2021	—	—	—	Georgia
2022	—	—	—	Georgia
2023	—	—	—	Michigan
2024	—	—	—	Ohio State
2025	—	—	—	Indiana

† Teams chosen solely by Billingsley amongst NCAA-designated "major selectors".

== See also ==
- NCAA Division I FBS national football championship
