= 1994 Bucknell Bison football team =

American college football season

1994 Bucknell Bison football
- Conference: Patriot League
- Record: 5–6 (2–3 Patriot)
- Head coach: Lou Maranzana (6th season)
- Captains: Ed Frattarelli; Russ Strohecker; Andrew Welty
- Home stadium: Christy Mathewson–Memorial Stadium

1994 Patriot League football standings
	Conf.					Overall
Team	W		L		T	W		L		T
Lafayette $	5	–	0	–	0	5	–	6	–	0
Lehigh	3	–	2	–	0	5	–	5	–	1
Holy Cross	3	–	2	–	0	3	–	8	–	0
Bucknell	2	–	3	–	0	5	–	6	–	0
Colgate	2	–	3	–	0	3	–	8	–	0
Fordham	0	–	5	–	0	0	–	11	–	0
$ – Conference champion

The 1994 Bucknell Bison football team was an American football team that represented Bucknell University during the 1994 NCAA Division I-AA football season. It tied for second-to-last in the Patriot League.

Bucknell played its home games at Christy Mathewson–Memorial Stadium on the university campus in Lewisburg, Pennsylvania.

During its sixth and final year under head coach Lou Maranzana, the Bison compiled a 5–6 record. Ed Frattarelli, Russ Strohecker and Andrew Welty were the team captains.

Bucknell's team was outscored 311 to 272. Its 2–3 conference record tied for fourth (and second-worst) in the six-team Patriot League standings.

== Schedule ==
Date	Opponent	Site	Result	Attendance	Source
September 10	Hofstra*	Christy Mathewson–Memorial Stadium; Lewisburg, PA	L 21–45	5,450	
September 17	Southern Connecticut*	Christy Mathewson–Memorial Stadium; Lewisburg, PA	W 32–7	3,145	
September 24	at Harvard*	Harvard Stadium; Boston, MA	W 42–23	5,130	
October 1	at Princeton*	Palmer Stadium; Princeton, NJ	L 7–12	6,055	
October 8	Towson State*	Christy Mathewson–Memorial Stadium; Lewisburg, PA	W 41–28	2,712	
October 15	at Cornell^{†}*	Christy Mathewson–Memorial Stadium; Lewisburg, PA	L 28–29	7,126	
October 22	at Lehigh	Goodman Stadium; Bethlehem, PA	W 31–27	13,101	
October 29	Lafayette^	Christy Mathewson–Memorial Stadium; Lewisburg, PA	L 14–56	8,288	
November 5	at Holy Cross	Fitton Field; Worcester, MA	L 20–27	10,288	
November 12	Colgate	Christy Mathewson–Memorial Stadium; Lewisburg, PA	L 7–31		
November 19	Fordham	Christy Mathewson–Memorial Stadium; Lewisburg, PA	W 29–26		
*Non-conference game; ^{†}Homecoming; ^ Parents Weekend
