= 1994 Lafayette Leopards football team =

American college football season

1994 Lafayette Leopards football

Patriot League champion
- Conference: Patriot League
- Record: 5–6 (5–0 Patriot)
- Head coach: Bill Russo (14th season)
- Captains: Harrison Bailey; Erik Marsh
- Home stadium: Fisher Field

1994 Patriot League football standings
	Conf.					Overall
Team	W		L		T	W		L		T
Lafayette $	5	–	0	–	0	5	–	6	–	0
Lehigh	3	–	2	–	0	5	–	5	–	1
Holy Cross	3	–	2	–	0	3	–	8	–	0
Bucknell	2	–	3	–	0	5	–	6	–	0
Colgate	2	–	3	–	0	3	–	8	–	0
Fordham	0	–	5	–	0	0	–	11	–	0
$ – Conference champion

The 1994 Lafayette Leopards football team was an American football team that represented Lafayette College during the 1994 NCAA Division I-AA football season. The Leopards won the Patriot League championship.

In their 14th year under head coach Bill Russo, the Leopards compiled a 5–6 record. Harrison Bailey and Erik Marsh were the team captains.

The Leopards outscored opponents 230 to 202. Their undefeated (5–0) conference record placed first in the six-team Patriot League standings.

Lafayette played its home games at Fisher Field on College Hill in Easton, Pennsylvania.

== Schedule ==
Date	Opponent	Site	Result	Attendance	Source
September 10	East Stroudsburg	Fisher Field; Easton, PA	L 14–31	6,219	
September 17	at No. 20 Penn*	Franklin Field; Philadelphia, PA	L 7–27	10,714	
September 24	Hofstra*	Fisher Field; Easton, PA	L 6–27	7,220	
October 1	at Columbia*	Wien Stadium; New York, NY	L 13–28	1,610	
October 8	Dartmouth*	Fisher Field; Easton, PA	L 15–27	5,989	
October 15	at Navy*	Navy–Marine Corps Memorial Stadium; Annapolis, MD	L 0–7	20,511	
October 22	Holy Cross	Fisher Field; Easton, PA	W 17–9	8,928	
October 29	at Bucknell	Christy Mathewson–Memorial Stadium; Lewisburg, PA	W 56–14	8,288	
November 5	at Colgate	Andy Kerr Stadium; Hamilton, NY	W 14–6	2,300	
November 12	at Fordham	Coffey Field; Bronx, NY	W 34–6	2,654	
November 19	Lehigh	Fisher Field; Easton, PA (The Rivalry)	W 54–20	13,734	
*Non-conference game; Rankings from The Sports Network Poll released prior to the game
