= 1994 Holy Cross Crusaders football team =

American college football season

1994 Holy Cross Crusaders football
- Conference: Patriot League
- Record: 3–8 (3–2 Patriot)
- Head coach: Peter Vaas (3rd season)
- Captains: Chris Nichol; Pat Smith
- Home stadium: Fitton Field

1994 Patriot League football standings
	Conf.					Overall
Team	W		L		T	W		L		T
Lafayette $	5	–	0	–	0	5	–	6	–	0
Lehigh	3	–	2	–	0	5	–	5	–	1
Holy Cross	3	–	2	–	0	3	–	8	–	0
Bucknell	2	–	3	–	0	5	–	6	–	0
Colgate	2	–	3	–	0	3	–	8	–	0
Fordham	0	–	5	–	0	0	–	11	–	0
$ – Conference champion

The 1994 Holy Cross Crusaders football team was an American football team that represented the College of the Holy Cross as a member of the Patriot League during the 1994 NCAA Division I-AA football season. In their third year under head coach Peter Vaas, the Crusaders compiled a 3–8 record and were outscored 327 to 175. Their 3–2 conference record, however, tied for second in the six-team Patriot League standings.

Holy Cross played its home games at Fitton Field on the college's campus in Worcester, Massachusetts. Pat Smith and Chris Nichol were the team captains.

== Schedule ==
Date	Opponent	Site	Result	Attendance	Source
September 10	at Army*	Michie Stadium; West Point, NY	L 3–49	26,535	
September 17	UMass^{†}*	Fitton Field; Worcester, MA	L 0–32	12,271	
September 24	at Yale*	Yale Bowl; New Haven, CT	L 22–47	10,028	
October 1	Harvard*	Fitton Field; Worcester, MA	L 17–27	8,611	
October 8	at No. 14 Penn*	Franklin Field; Philadelphia, PA	L 8–59	7,830	
October 15	at Brown*	Brown Stadium; Providence, RI	L 18–20	3,537	
October 22	at Lafayette	Fisher Field; Easton, PA	L 9–17	8,928	
October 29	at Fordham	Coffey Field; Bronx, NY (rivalry)	W 31–21	4,475	
November 5	Bucknell^	Fitton Field; Worcester, MA	W 27–20	10,288	
November 12	Lehigh	Fitton Field; Worcester, MA	L 13–29	7,914	
November 19	at Colgate	Andy Kerr Stadium; Hamilton, NY	W 27–6		
*Non-conference game; ^{†}Homecoming; ^ Family Weekend; Rankings from The Sports Network Poll released prior to the game
