= 1994 Harvard Crimson football team =

American college football season

1994 Harvard Crimson football
- Conference: Ivy League
- Record: 4–6 (2–5 Ivy)
- Head coach: Timothy Murphy (1st season)
- Offensive coordinator: Michael Foley (1st season)
- Offensive scheme: Multiple
- Defensive coordinator: Mark Harriman (1st season)
- Captain: Edward Kinney
- Home stadium: Harvard Stadium

1994 Ivy League football standings
	Conf.					Overall
Team	W		L		T	W		L		T
No. 14 Penn $	7	–	0	–	0	9	–	0	–	0
Brown	4	–	3	–	0	7	–	3	–	0
Princeton	4	–	3	–	0	7	–	3	–	0
Cornell	3	–	4	–	0	6	–	4	–	0
Columbia	3	–	4	–	0	5	–	4	–	1
Yale	3	–	4	–	0	5	–	5	–	0
Dartmouth	2	–	5	–	0	4	–	6	–	0
Harvard	2	–	5	–	0	4	–	6	–	0
$ – Conference champion; Rankings from The Sports Network poll

The 1994 Harvard Crimson football team was an American football team that represented Harvard University during the 1994 NCAA Division I-AA football season. The Crimson tied for last place in the Ivy League.

In their first year under head coach Timothy Murphy, the Crimson compiled a 4–6 record and were outscored 254 to 209. Edward Kinney was the team captain.

Harvard's 2–5 conference record tied for seventh (and worst) in the Ivy League standings. The Crimson were outscored 152 to 124 by Ivy opponents.

Harvard played its home games at Harvard Stadium in the Allston neighborhood of Boston, Massachusetts.

== Schedule ==
Date	Opponent	Site	Result	Attendance	Source
September 17	at Columbia	Wien Stadium; New York, NY	W 39–32	6,425	
September 24	Bucknell*	Harvard Stadium; Boston, MA	L 23–42	5,130	
October 1	at Holy Cross*	Fitton Field; Worcester, MA	W 27–17	8,611	
October 8	Cornell	Harvard Stadium; Boston, MA	L 13–18	12,880	
October 15	Colgate*	Harvard Stadium; Boston, MA	W 35–27	8,175	
October 22	at Princeton	Palmer Stadium; Princeton, NJ (rivalry)	L 7–18	15,143	
October 29	at Dartmouth	Memorial Field; Hanover, NH (rivalry)	W 35–12	9,529	
November 5	Brown	Harvard Stadium; Boston, MA	L 17–23	14,724	
November 12	at No. 13 Penn	Franklin Field; Philadelphia, PA	L 0–33	28,918	
November 19	Yale	Harvard Stadium; Boston, MA (The Game)	L 13–32	25,500	
*Non-conference game; Rankings from The Sports Network Poll released prior to the game
