= 1870 Columbia football team =

American college football season

1870 Columbia football
- Conference: Independent
- Record: 0–1
- Head coach: None
- Captain: Stuyvesant Fish

1870 college football records
	Conf.			Overall
Team	W	L	T	W		L		T
Princeton		–		1	–	0	–	0
Rutgers		–		1	–	1	–	0
Columbia		–		0	–	1	–	0

The 1870 Columbia football team represented Columbia University in the 1870 college football season. The team had no head coach, and compiled a record of 0–1. Stuyvesant Fish served as team captain.

== Schedule ==
Date	Opponent	Site	Result
November 5	at Rutgers	New Brunswick, NJ	L 3–6
