= 1994 Cornell Big Red football team =

American college football season

1994 Cornell Big Red football
- Conference: Ivy League
- Record: 6–4 (3–4 Ivy)
- Head coach: Jim Hofher (5th season)
- Captains: Dick Emmet; Terry Golden; Mike McKean; John Vitullo
- Home stadium: Schoellkopf Field

1994 Ivy League football standings
	Conf.					Overall
Team	W		L		T	W		L		T
No. 14 Penn $	7	–	0	–	0	9	–	0	–	0
Brown	4	–	3	–	0	7	–	3	–	0
Princeton	4	–	3	–	0	7	–	3	–	0
Cornell	3	–	4	–	0	6	–	4	–	0
Columbia	3	–	4	–	0	5	–	4	–	1
Yale	3	–	4	–	0	5	–	5	–	0
Dartmouth	2	–	5	–	0	4	–	6	–	0
Harvard	2	–	5	–	0	4	–	6	–	0
$ – Conference champion; Rankings from The Sports Network poll

The 1994 Cornell Big Red football team was an American football team that represented Cornell University during the 1994 NCAA Division I-AA football season. Cornell tied for fourth in the Ivy League.

In its fifth season under head coach Jim Hofher, the team compiled a 6–4 record and outscored opponents 193 to 190. Team captains were Dick Emmet, Terry Golden, Mike McKean and John Vitullo.

Cornell's 3–4 conference record placed it in a three-way tie for fourth in the Ivy League standings. The Big Red were outscored 139 to 130 by Ivy opponents.

Following a six-game winning streak, Cornell was briefly ranked No. 25 in the nation in Division I-AA, in the poll released October 26. The team then suffered a four-game losing streak and was not ranked any other week.

Cornell played its home games at Schoellkopf Field in Ithaca, New York.

== Schedule ==
Date	Opponent	Site	Result	Attendance	Source
September 17	Princeton^{†}	Schoellkopf Field; Ithaca, NY	W 31–16	12,573	
September 24	at Fordham*	Coffey Field; Bronx, NY	W 13–6	5,527	
October 1	Lehigh*	Schoellkopf Field; Ithaca, NY	W 21–17	8,635	
October 8	at Harvard	Harvard Stadium; Boston, MA	W 18–13	12,880	
October 15	at Bucknell*	Christy Mathewson–Memorial Stadium; Lewisburg, PA	W 29–28	7,126	
October 22	Dartmouth	Schoellkopf Field; Ithaca, NY (rivalry)	W 17–14	10,863	
October 29	Brown	Schoellkopf Field; Ithaca, NY	L 3–16	8,294	
November 5	at Yale	Yale Bowl; New Haven, CT	L 14–24	12,892	
November 12	at Columbia	Wien Stadium; New York, NY (rivalry)	L 33–38	8,825	
November 19	No. 13 Penn	Schoellkopf Field; Ithaca, NY (rivalry)	L 14–18	9,223	
*Non-conference game; ^{†}Homecoming; Rankings from The Sports Network Poll released prior to the game
