= 1994 Yale Bulldogs football team =

American college football season

1994 Yale Bulldogs football
- Conference: Ivy League
- Record: 5–5 (3–4 Ivy)
- Head coach: Carmen Cozza (30th season)
- Defensive coordinator: Bob Shoop (1st season)
- Home stadium: Yale Bowl

1994 Ivy League football standings
| | Conf. | | | | | Overall |
| Team | W | | L | | T | W | | L | | T |
|---|---|---|---|---|---|---|---|---|---|---|
| No. 14 Penn $ | 7 | – | 0 | – | 0 | 9 | – | 0 | – | 0 |
| Brown | 4 | – | 3 | – | 0 | 7 | – | 3 | – | 0 |
| Princeton | 4 | – | 3 | – | 0 | 7 | – | 3 | – | 0 |
| Cornell | 3 | – | 4 | – | 0 | 6 | – | 4 | – | 0 |
| Columbia | 3 | – | 4 | – | 0 | 5 | – | 4 | – | 1 |
| Yale | 3 | – | 4 | – | 0 | 5 | – | 5 | – | 0 |
| Dartmouth | 2 | – | 5 | – | 0 | 4 | – | 6 | – | 0 |
| Harvard | 2 | – | 5 | – | 0 | 4 | – | 6 | – | 0 |
$ – Conference champion; Rankings from The Sports Network poll

The 1994 Yale Bulldogs football team represented Yale University in the 1994 NCAA Division I-AA football season. The Bulldogs were led by 30th-year head coach Carmen Cozza, played their home games at the Yale Bowl and finished tied for fourth place in the Ivy League with a 3–4 record, 5–5 overall.

== Schedule ==
| Date | Opponent | Site | Result | Attendance | Source |
|---|---|---|---|---|---|
| September 17 | at Brown | Brown Stadium; Providence, RI | W 27–16 | 9,659 | |
| September 24 | Holy Cross* | Yale Bowl; New Haven, CT | W 47–22 | 10,028 | |
| October 1 | Connecticut* | Yale Bowl; New Haven, CT | W 28–17 | 9,314 | |
| October 8 | Lehigh* | Yale Bowl; New Haven, CT | L 32–36 | 13,676 | |
| October 15 | at Dartmouth | Memorial Field; Hanover, NH | L 13–14 | 15,150 | |
| October 22 | Columbia | Yale Bowl; New Haven, CT | L 9–30 | 16,167 | |
| October 29 | at Penn | Franklin Field; Philadelphia, PA | L 6–14 | 21,650 | |
| November 5 | Cornell | Yale Bowl; New Haven, CT | W 24–14 | 12,892 | |
| November 12 | Princeton | Yale Bowl; New Haven, CT (rivalry) | L 6–19 | 18,185 | |
| November 19 | at Harvard | Harvard Stadium; Boston, MA (The Game) | W 32–13 | 35,500 | |
*Non-conference game
