= 1994 Princeton Tigers football team =

American college football season

1994 Princeton Tigers football
- Conference: Ivy League
- Record: 7–3 (4–3 Ivy)
- Head coach: Steve Tosches (8th season)
- Captains: Mark Berkowitz; Carl Teter
- Home stadium: Palmer Stadium

1994 Ivy League football standings
	Conf.					Overall
Team	W		L		T	W		L		T
No. 14 Penn $	7	–	0	–	0	9	–	0	–	0
Brown	4	–	3	–	0	7	–	3	–	0
Princeton	4	–	3	–	0	7	–	3	–	0
Cornell	3	–	4	–	0	6	–	4	–	0
Columbia	3	–	4	–	0	5	–	4	–	1
Yale	3	–	4	–	0	5	–	5	–	0
Dartmouth	2	–	5	–	0	4	–	6	–	0
Harvard	2	–	5	–	0	4	–	6	–	0
$ – Conference champion; Rankings from The Sports Network poll

The 1994 Princeton Tigers football team was an American football team that represented Princeton University during the 1994 NCAA Division I-AA football season. Princeton tied for second place in the Ivy League.

In their eighth year under head coach Steve Tosches, the Tigers compiled a 7–3 record and outscored opponents 181 to 149. Mark Berkowitz and Carl Teter were the team captains.

Princeton's 4–3 conference record tied for second-best in the Ivy League standings. The Tigers outscored Ivy League opponents 133 to 117.

Princeton played its home games at Palmer Stadium on the university campus in Princeton, New Jersey.

== Schedule ==
Date	Opponent	Site	Result	Attendance	Source
September 17	at Cornell	Schoellkopf Field; Ithaca, NY	L 16–31	12,573	
September 24	Colgate*	Palmer Stadium; Princeton, NJ	W 29–3	7,143	
October 1	Bucknell*	Palmer Stadium; Princeton, NJ	W 12–7	6,055	
October 8	Brown	Palmer Stadium; Princeton, NJ	W 31–10	10,099	
October 15	at Fordham*	Coffey Field; Bronx, NY	W 27–20	5,327	
October 22	Harvard	Palmer Stadium; Princeton, NJ (rivalry)	W 18–7	15,143	
October 29	at Columbia	Wien Stadium; New York, NY	L 10–17	12,850	
November 5	No. 14 Penn	Palmer Stadium; Princeton, NJ (rivalry)	L 19–33	21,985	
November 12	at Yale	Yale Bowl; New Haven, CT (rivalry)	W 19–6	18,185	
November 19	Dartmouth	Palmer Stadium; Princeton, NJ	W 20–13	10,011	
*Non-conference game; Rankings from The Sports Network Poll released prior to the game
