= 1994 Columbia Lions football team =

American college football season

1994 Columbia Lions football
- Conference: Ivy League
- Record: 5–4–1 (3–4 Ivy)
- Head coach: Ray Tellier (6th season)
- Defensive coordinator: Mike Donnelly (3rd season)
- Captains: Brian Bassett; Jamie Schwalbe
- Home stadium: Wien Stadium

1994 Ivy League football standings
	Conf.					Overall
Team	W		L		T	W		L		T
No. 14 Penn $	7	–	0	–	0	9	–	0	–	0
Brown	4	–	3	–	0	7	–	3	–	0
Princeton	4	–	3	–	0	7	–	3	–	0
Cornell	3	–	4	–	0	6	–	4	–	0
Columbia	3	–	4	–	0	5	–	4	–	1
Yale	3	–	4	–	0	5	–	5	–	0
Dartmouth	2	–	5	–	0	4	–	6	–	0
Harvard	2	–	5	–	0	4	–	6	–	0
$ – Conference champion; Rankings from The Sports Network poll

The 1994 Columbia Lions football team was an American football team that represented Columbia University during the 1994 NCAA Division I-AA football season. Columbia tied for fourth in the Ivy League.

In their sixth season under head coach Ray Tellier, the Lions compiled a 5–4–1 record and outscored opponents 240 to 230. Brian Bassett and Jamie Schwalbe were the team captains.

The Lions' 3–4 conference record placed them in a three-way tie for fourth in the Ivy League standings. Columbia was outscored 176 to 160 by Ivy opponents.

Columbia played its homes games at Lawrence A. Wien Stadium in Upper Manhattan, in New York City.

== Schedule ==
Date	Opponent	Site	Result	Attendance	Source
September 17	Harvard	Wien Stadium; New York, NY	L 32–39	6,425	
September 24	at Lehigh*	Goodman Stadium; Bethlehem, PA	T 28–28	10,585	
October 1	Lafayette*	Wien Stadium; New York, NY	W 28–13	1,610	
October 8	at Fordham*	Coffey Field; Bronx, NY (rivalry)	W 24–13	5,266	
October 15	at No. 13 Penn	Franklin Field; Philadelphia, PA	L 3–12	5,262	
October 22	at Yale	Yale Bowl; New Haven, CT	W 30–9	16,167	
October 29	Princeton^{†}	Wien Stadium; New York, NY	W 17–10	12,850	
November 5	at Dartmouth	Memorial Field; Hanover, NH	L 13–14	4,115	
November 12	Cornell	Wien Stadium; New York, NY (rivalry)	W 38–33	8,825	
November 19	Brown	Wien Stadium; New York, NY	L 27–59	7,375	
*Non-conference game; ^{†}Homecoming; Rankings from The Sports Network Poll released prior to the game
