= 1870 Rutgers Queensmen football team =

American college football season

1870 Rutgers Queensmen football
- Conference: Independent
- Record: 1–1
- Head coach: None
- Captain: William J. Leggett

1870 college football records
	Conf.			Overall
Team	W	L	T	W		L		T
Princeton		–		1	–	0	–	0
Rutgers		–		1	–	1	–	0
Columbia		–		0	–	1	–	0

The 1870 Rutgers Queensmen football team represented Rutgers University in the 1870 college football season. Rutgers finished with a 1–1 record. The Captain of the team was William J. Leggett.

== Schedule ==
Date	Opponent	Site	Result
November 5	Columbia	New Brunswick, NJ	W 6–3
November 19	at Princeton	Princeton, NJ (rivalry)	L 3-0
