= 1994 Dartmouth Big Green football team =

American college football season

1994 Dartmouth Big Green football
- Conference: Ivy League
- Record: 4–6 (2–5 Ivy)
- Head coach: John Lyons (3rd season)
- Offensive coordinator: Roger Hughes (3rd season)
- Captains: Josh Bloom; Hunter Buckner
- Home stadium: Memorial Field

1994 Ivy League football standings
	Conf.					Overall
Team	W		L		T	W		L		T
No. 14 Penn $	7	–	0	–	0	9	–	0	–	0
Brown	4	–	3	–	0	7	–	3	–	0
Princeton	4	–	3	–	0	7	–	3	–	0
Cornell	3	–	4	–	0	6	–	4	–	0
Columbia	3	–	4	–	0	5	–	4	–	1
Yale	3	–	4	–	0	5	–	5	–	0
Dartmouth	2	–	5	–	0	4	–	6	–	0
Harvard	2	–	5	–	0	4	–	6	–	0
$ – Conference champion; Rankings from The Sports Network poll

The 1994 Dartmouth Big Green football team was an American football team that represented Dartmouth College during the 1994 NCAA Division I-AA football season. The Big Green tied for last place in the Ivy League.

In its third season under head coach John Lyons, the team compiled a 4–6 record and was outscored 187 to 166. Josh Bloom and Hunter Buckner were the team captains.

The Big Green's 2–5 conference record tied for seventh (and worst) in the Ivy League standings. Dartmouth was outscored 138 to 92 by Ivy opponents.

Dartmouth played its home games at Memorial Field on the college campus in Hanover, New Hampshire.

== Schedule ==
Date	Opponent	Site	Result	Attendance	Source
September 17	at Colgate*	Andy Kerr Stadium; Hamilton, NY	L 16–20		
September 24	No. 18 Penn	Memorial Field; Hanover, NH	L 11–13	8,024	
October 1	Fordham*	Memorial Field; Hanover, NH	W 31–14	5,101	
October 8	at Lafayette*	Fisher Field; Easton, PA	W 27–15	5,989	
October 15	Yale	Memorial Field; Hanover, NH	W 14–13	15,150	
October 22	at Cornell	Schoellkopf Field; Ithaca, NY (rivalry)	L 14–17	10,863	
October 29	Harvard	Memorial Field; Hanover, NH (rivalry)	L 12–35	9,529	
November 5	Columbia	Memorial Field; Hanover, NH	W 14–13	4,115	
November 12	at Brown	Brown Stadium; Providence, RI	L 14–27	4,021	
November 19	at Princeton	Palmer Stadium; Princeton, NJ	L 13–20	10,011	
*Non-conference game; Rankings from The Sports Network Poll released prior to the game
