= 1994 Lehigh Engineers football team =

American college football season

1994 Lehigh Engineers football
- Conference: Patriot League
- Record: 5–5–1 (3–2 Patriot)
- Head coach: Kevin Higgins (1st season)
- Offensive coordinator: Dave Clawson (1st season)
- Captains: Dan Gormsen; Sam Lawler
- Home stadium: Goodman Stadium

1994 Patriot League football standings
	Conf.					Overall
Team	W		L		T	W		L		T
Lafayette $	5	–	0	–	0	5	–	6	–	0
Lehigh	3	–	2	–	0	5	–	5	–	1
Holy Cross	3	–	2	–	0	3	–	8	–	0
Bucknell	2	–	3	–	0	5	–	6	–	0
Colgate	2	–	3	–	0	3	–	8	–	0
Fordham	0	–	5	–	0	0	–	11	–	0
$ – Conference champion

The 1994 Lehigh Engineers football team was an American football team that represented Lehigh University during the 1994 NCAA Division I-AA football season. Lehigh tied for second in the Patriot League.

In their first year under head coach Kevin Higgins, the Engineers compiled a 5–5–1 record. Dan Gormsen and Sam Lawler were the team captains.

The Engineers were outscored 314 to 307. Their 3–2 conference record, however, tied for second place in the six-team Patriot League standings.

Lehigh played its home games at Goodman Stadium on the university's Goodman Campus in Bethlehem, Pennsylvania.

== Schedule ==
Date	Opponent	Site	Result	Attendance	Source
September 10	Fordham	Goodman Stadium; Bethlehem, PA	W 38–7	9,023	
September 17	at Buffalo*	University at Buffalo Stadium; Amherst, NY	W 48–19		
September 24	Columbia*	Goodman Stadium; Bethlehem, PA	T 28–28	10,585	
October 1	at Cornell*	Schoellkopf Field; Ithaca, NY	L 17–21	8,635	
October 8	at Yale*	Yale Bowl; New Haven, CT	W 36–32	13,676	
October 15	at New Hampshire*	Cowell Stadium; Durham, NH	L 10–42	13,301	
October 22	Bucknell	Goodman Stadium; Bethlehem, PA	L 27–31	13,101	
October 29	Colgate	Goodman Stadium; Bethlehem, PA	W 25–22	9,027	
November 5	Delaware*	Goodman Stadium; Bethlehem, PA (rivalry)	L 29–45	10,480	
November 12	at Holy Cross	Fitton Field; Worcester, MA	W 29–13	7,914	
November 19	at Lafayette	Fisher Field; Easton, PA (The Rivalry)	L 20–54	13,734	
*Non-conference game
