= 1994 Penn Quakers football team =

American college football season

1994 Penn Quakers football

Ivy League champion
- Conference: Ivy League

Ranking
- Sports Network: No. 14
- Record: 9–0 (7–0 Ivy)
- Head coach: Al Bagnoli (3rd season)
- Defensive coordinator: Mike Toop (3rd season)
- Home stadium: Franklin Field

1994 Ivy League football standings
	Conf.					Overall
Team	W		L		T	W		L		T
No. 14 Penn $	7	–	0	–	0	9	–	0	–	0
Brown	4	–	3	–	0	7	–	3	–	0
Princeton	4	–	3	–	0	7	–	3	–	0
Cornell	3	–	4	–	0	6	–	4	–	0
Columbia	3	–	4	–	0	5	–	4	–	1
Yale	3	–	4	–	0	5	–	5	–	0
Dartmouth	2	–	5	–	0	4	–	6	–	0
Harvard	2	–	5	–	0	4	–	6	–	0
$ – Conference champion; Rankings from The Sports Network poll

The 1994 Penn Quakers football team represented the University of Pennsylvania in the 1994 NCAA Division I-AA football season. Penn was undefeated and won the Ivy League championship.

== Schedule ==
Date	Opponent	Site	Result	Attendance	Source
September 17	Lafayette*	Franklin Field; Philadelphia, PA	W 27–7	10,714	
September 24	at Dartmouth	Memorial Field; Hanover, NH	W 13–11	8,024	
October 8	Holy Cross*	Franklin Field; Philadelphia, PA	W 59–8	7,830	
October 15	Columbia	Franklin Field; Philadelphia, PA	W 12–3	5,262	
October 22	at Brown	Brown Stadium; Providence, RI	W 24–0	7,009	
October 29	Yale	Franklin Field; Philadelphia, PA	W 14–6	21,650	
November 5	at Princeton	Palmer Stadium; Princeton, NJ (rivalry)	W 33–19	21,985	
November 12	Harvard	Franklin Field; Philadelphia, PA (rivalry)	W 33–0	28,918	
November 19	at Cornell	Schoellkopf Field; Ithaca, NY (rivalry)	W 18–14	9,223	
*Non-conference game
