= 1994 Colgate Red Raiders football team =

American college football season

1994 Colgate Red Raiders football
- Conference: Patriot League
- Record: 3–8 (2–3 Patriot)
- Head coach: Ed Sweeney (2nd season)
- Captain: Mike Boorman
- Home stadium: Andy Kerr Stadium

1994 Patriot League football standings
| | Conf. | | | | | Overall |
| Team | W | | L | | T | W | | L | | T |
|---|---|---|---|---|---|---|---|---|---|---|
| Lafayette $ | 5 | – | 0 | – | 0 | 5 | – | 6 | – | 0 |
| Lehigh | 3 | – | 2 | – | 0 | 5 | – | 5 | – | 1 |
| Holy Cross | 3 | – | 2 | – | 0 | 3 | – | 8 | – | 0 |
| Bucknell | 2 | – | 3 | – | 0 | 5 | – | 6 | – | 0 |
| Colgate | 2 | – | 3 | – | 0 | 3 | – | 8 | – | 0 |
| Fordham | 0 | – | 5 | – | 0 | 0 | – | 11 | – | 0 |
$ – Conference champion

The 1994 Colgate Red Raiders football team was an American football team that represented Colgate University during the 1994 NCAA Division I-AA football season. Colgate tied for second-to-last in the Patriot League.

In its second season under head coach Ed Sweeney, the team compiled a 3–8 record. Mike Boorman was the team captain.

The Red Raiders were outscored 253 to 174. Their 2–3 conference record tied for fourth (and second-worst) in the six-team Patriot League standings.

The team played its home games at Andy Kerr Stadium in Hamilton, New York.

== Schedule ==
| Date | Opponent | Site | Result | Attendance | Source |
|---|---|---|---|---|---|
| September 10 | No. 10 Boston University* | Andy Kerr Stadium; Hamilton, NY | L 7–45 | | |
| September 17 | Dartmouth* | Andy Kerr Stadium; Hamilton, NY | W 20–16 | | |
| September 24 | at Princeton* | Palmer Stadium; Princeton, NJ | L 3–29 | 7,143 | |
| October 1 | at Brown* | Brown Stadium; Providence, RI | L 7–26 | 3,415 | |
| October 8 | at Buffalo* | University at Buffalo Stadium; Amherst, NY | L 10–23 | | |
| October 15 | at Harvard* | Harvard Stadium; Boston, MA | L 27–35 | 8,175 | |
| October 22 | Fordham | Andy Kerr Stadium; Hamilton, NY | W 35–6 | | |
| October 29 | at Lehigh | Goodman Stadium; Bethlehem, PA | L 22–25 | 9,027 | |
| November 5 | Lafayette | Andy Kerr Stadium; Hamilton, NY | L 6–14 | 2,300 | |
| November 12 | at Bucknell | Christy Mathewson–Memorial Stadium; Lewisburg, PA | W 31–7 | | |
| November 19 | Holy Cross | Andy Kerr Stadium; Hamilton, NY | L 6–27 | | |
*Non-conference game; Rankings from The Sports Network Poll released prior to the game
