= 1994 Brown Bears football team =

American college football season

1994 Brown Bears football
- Conference: Ivy League
- Record: 7–3 (4–3 Ivy)
- Head coach: Mark Whipple (1st season)
- Offensive coordinator: Joe Wirth (3rd season)
- Captains: Brett Atkins; Charlie Buckley
- Home stadium: Brown Stadium

1994 Ivy League football standings
	Conf.					Overall
Team	W		L		T	W		L		T
No. 14 Penn $	7	–	0	–	0	9	–	0	–	0
Brown	4	–	3	–	0	7	–	3	–	0
Princeton	4	–	3	–	0	7	–	3	–	0
Cornell	3	–	4	–	0	6	–	4	–	0
Columbia	3	–	4	–	0	5	–	4	–	1
Yale	3	–	4	–	0	5	–	5	–	0
Dartmouth	2	–	5	–	0	4	–	6	–	0
Harvard	2	–	5	–	0	4	–	6	–	0
$ – Conference champion; Rankings from The Sports Network poll

The 1994 Brown Bears football team was an American football team that represented Brown University during the 1994 NCAA Division I-AA football season. Brown tied for second in the Ivy League.

In their first season under head coach Mark Whipple, the Bears compiled a 7–3 record and outscored opponents 229 to 197. Brett Atkins and Charlie Buckley were the team captains.

The Bears 4–3 conference tied for second in the Ivy League standings. They outscored Ivy opponents 151 to 143.

Brown played its home games at Brown Stadium in Providence, Rhode Island.

== Schedule ==
Date	Opponent	Site	Result	Attendance	Source
September 17	Yale	Brown Stadium; Providence, RI	L 16–27	9,659	
September 24	at Rhode Island*	Meade Stadium; Kingston, RI (rivalry)	W 32–29	5,692	
October 1	Colgate*	Brown Stadium; Providence, RI	W 26–7	3,415	
October 8	at Princeton	Palmer Stadium; Princeton, NJ	L 10–31	10,099	
October 15	Holy Cross*	Brown Stadium; Providence, RI	W 20–18	3,537	
October 22	No. 13 Penn^{†}	Brown Stadium; Providence, RI	L 0–24	7,009	
October 29	at No. 25 Cornell	Schoellkopf Field; Ithaca, NY	W 16–3	8,294	
November 5	at Harvard	Harvard Stadium; Boston, MA	W 23–17	14,724	
November 12	Dartmouth	Brown Stadium; Providence, RI	W 27–14	4,021	
November 19	at Columbia	Wien Stadium; New York, NY	W 59–27	7,375	
*Non-conference game; ^{†}Homecoming; Rankings from The Sports Network Poll released prior to the game
