= 1994 Fordham Rams football team =

American college football season

1994 Fordham Rams football
- Conference: Patriot League
- Record: 0–11 (0–5 Patriot)
- Head coach: Nick Quartaro (1st season)
- Defensive coordinator: Vince Sinagra (1st season)
- Captains: Mark Mooney; Maurice O'Shea; Chris Ross; Jeff Rupp
- Home stadium: Coffey Field

1994 Patriot League football standings
	Conf.					Overall
Team	W		L		T	W		L		T
Lafayette $	5	–	0	–	0	5	–	6	–	0
Lehigh	3	–	2	–	0	5	–	5	–	1
Holy Cross	3	–	2	–	0	3	–	8	–	0
Bucknell	2	–	3	–	0	5	–	6	–	0
Colgate	2	–	3	–	0	3	–	8	–	0
Fordham	0	–	5	–	0	0	–	11	–	0
$ – Conference champion

The 1994 Fordham Rams football team was an American football team that represented Fordham University during the 1994 NCAA Division I-AA football season. Fordham did not win a game and finished last in the Patriot League.

In their first year under head coach Nick Quartaro, the Rams compiled an 0–11 record. Mark Mooney, Maurice O'Shea, Chris Ross and Jeff Rupp were the team captains.

The Rams were outscored 315 to 146. Their winless (0–5) conference record placed last in the six-team Patriot League standings. This was Fordham's fifth consecutive year finishing last, after beginning Patriot League play in 1990.

Fordham played its home games at Jack Coffey Field on the university's Rose Hill campus in The Bronx, in New York City.

== Schedule ==
Date	Opponent	Site	Result	Attendance	Source
September 3	Villanova*	Coffey Field; Bronx, NY	L 7–23	4,243	
September 10	at Lehigh	Goodman Stadium; Bethlehem, PA	L 7–38	9,023	
September 17	at Hofstra*	Hofstra Stadium; Hempstead, NY	L 20–30	5,189	
September 24	Cornell*	Coffey Field; Bronx, NY	L 6–13	5,527	
October 1	at Dartmouth*	Memorial Field; Hanover, NH	L 14–31	5,101	
October 8	Columbia*	Coffey Field; Bronx, NY (rivalry)	L 13–24	5,266	
October 15	Princeton*	Coffey Field; Bronx, NY	L 20–27	5,327	
October 22	at Colgate	Andy Kerr Stadium; Hamilton, NY	L 6–35		
October 29	Holy Cross	Coffey Field; Bronx, NY (rivalry)	L 21–31	4,475	
November 12	Lafayette	Coffey Field; Bronx, NY	L 6–34	2,654	
November 19	at Bucknell	Christy Mathewson–Memorial Stadium; Lewisburg, PA	L 26–29		
*Non-conference game
