= 1872 Rutgers Queensmen football team =

American college football season

1872 Rutgers Queensmen football
- Conference: Independent
- Record: 1–1–1
- Head coach: None
- Captain: Claudius Rockefeller

1872 college football records
	Conf.			Overall
Team	W	L	T	W		L		T
Princeton		–		1	–	0	–	0
Yale		–		1	–	0	–	0
Rutgers		–		1	–	1	–	1
Columbia		–		1	–	2	–	1
Stevens		–		0	–	1	–	0

The 1872 Rutgers Queensmen football team represented Rutgers University in the 1872 college football season. Rutgers finished with a 1–1–1 record. The Captain of the team was Claudius Rockefeller.

== Schedule ==
Date	Opponent	Site	Result
November 2	at Columbia	New York, NY	T 0–0
November 9	Columbia	New Brunswick, NJ	W 5-2
November 23	at Princeton	Princeton, NJ (rivalry)	L 1–4

== See also ==
- List of the first college football game in each US state
