= Princeton Tigers football =

Football team of Princeton University

2025 Princeton Tigers football team
- First season: 1869; 157 years ago (Note: The date is set after the first de facto college football game held in 1869 between Princeton and Rutgers Universities. It is considered the first football game in the US although it was played with rules based on 1863 rules that disallowed carrying or throwing the ball.)
- Athletic director: John Mack
- Head coach: Bob Surace; 15th season, 84–66 (.560)
- Location: Princeton, New Jersey
- Stadium: Princeton Stadium (capacity: 27,773)
- Conference: Ivy League
- Colors: Black and orange
- All-time record: 868–435–50 (.660)

National championships
- Claimed: 1869, 1870, 1872, 1873, 1874, 1875, 1877, 1878, 1879, 1880, 1881, 1884, 1885, 1886, 1889, 1893, 1894, 1896, 1898, 1899, 1903, 1906, 1911, 1920, 1922, 1933, 1935, 1950

Conference championships
- Ivy League: 1957, 1963, 1964, 1966, 1969, 1989, 1992, 1995, 2006, 2013, 2016, 2018, 2021
- Heisman winners: Dick Kazmaier – 1951
- Consensus All-Americans: 93
- Rivalries: Harvard (rivalry); Penn (rivalry); Rutgers (rivalry); Yale (rivalry)

Uniforms
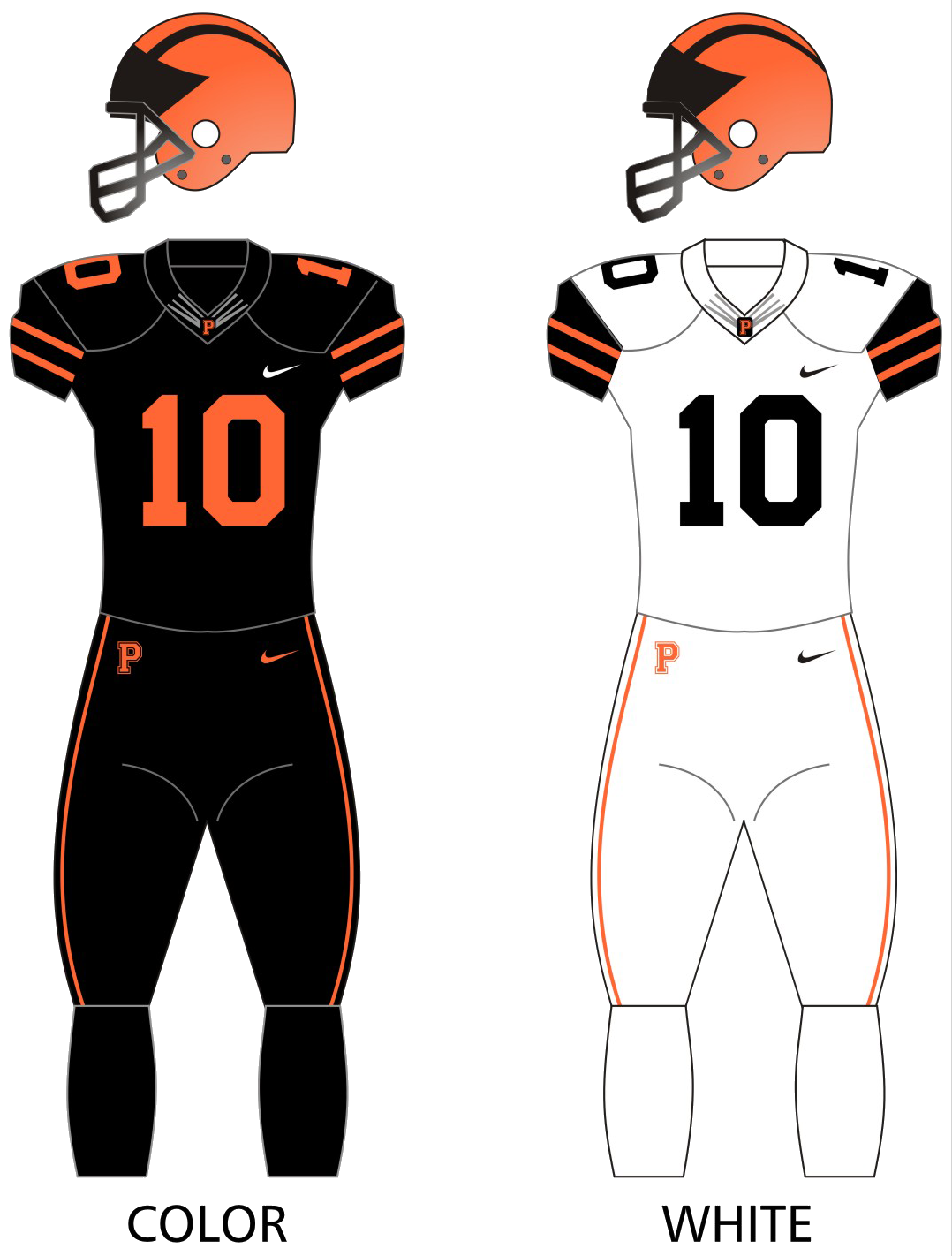
- Fight song: "Princeton Cannon Song"
- Marching band: Princeton University Band
- Website: GoPrincetonTigers.com

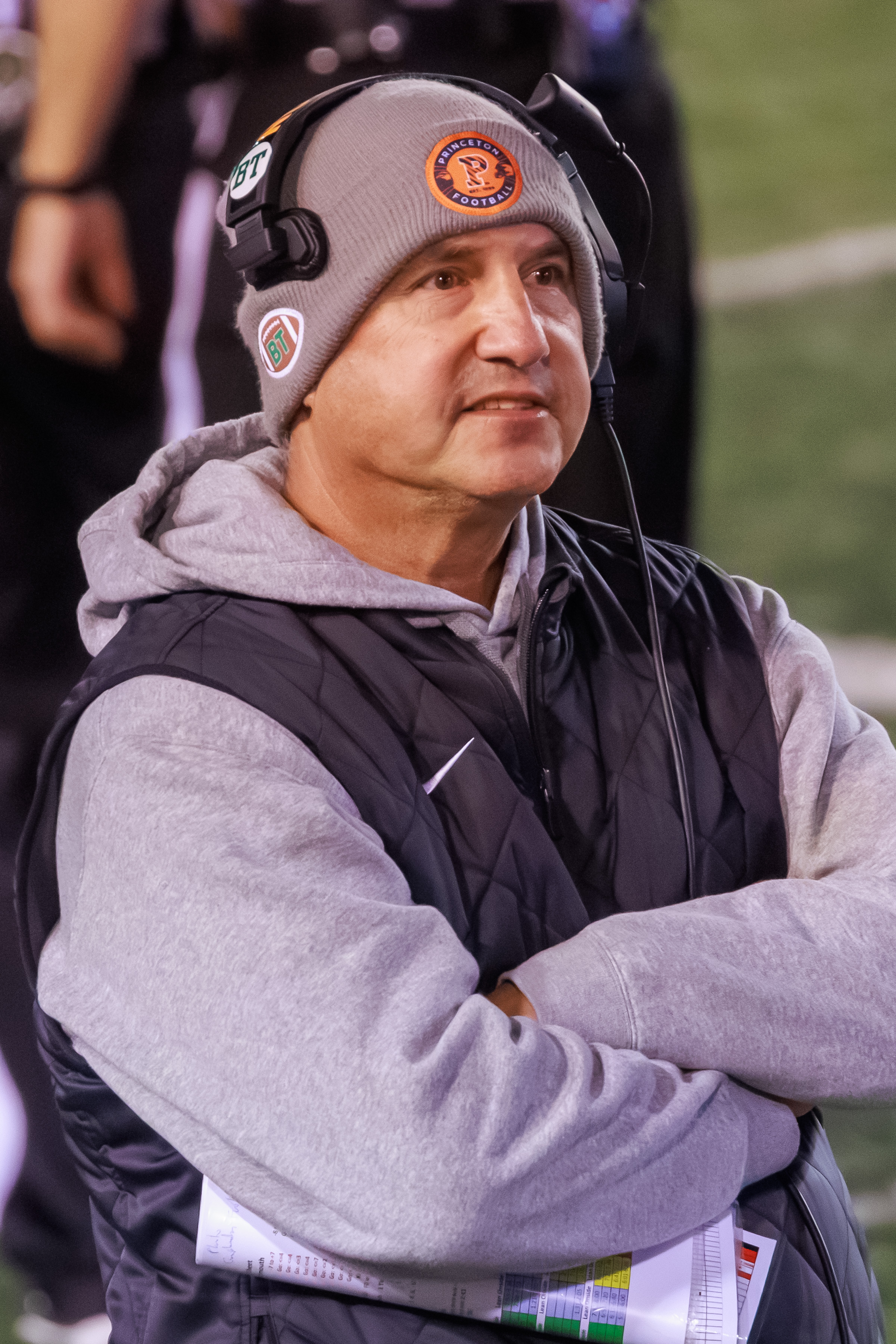
Coach Bob Surace

The Princeton Tigers football program represents Princeton University and competes at the National Collegiate Athletic Association (NCAA) Division I Football Championship Subdivision (FCS) level as a member of the Ivy League. Princeton's football program—along with the football program at nearby Rutgers University—began in 1869 with a contest that is often regarded as the beginnings of American football.

== History ==
=== First football game ===
Students from The College of New Jersey (now Princeton University) traveled to New Brunswick, New Jersey on November 6, 1869, to play Rutgers College (now Rutgers University) in a game using a modified version of London's Football Association rules. The game inlayers on each side and the round ball could only be advanced by kicking it. Rutgers won what has been called the first intercollegiate American football game 6–4. Taken literally, the Princeton/Rutgers game involved a 'foot' kicking a 'ball', hence the term 'football' that gives rise to the Princeton/Rutgers match being considered as the first game of American 'football' between two American colleges. A closer rendition of the modern game of football would come six years later in a match between Harvard and Tufts where the ball could only be advanced by running or passing, but not kicking it. A week after the Princeton/Rutgers game, the Rutgers team traveled to Princeton for a rematch, which Princeton won 8–0.

=== Early history ===
Due in part to their invention of the sport, the Tigers were one of the dominant forces in the early days of intercollegiate football, winning 22 of the first 40 national titles (1869–1909). As the sport transformed at the hands of figures like Brown University's John Heisman and Yale's Walter Camp and more schools began competing, Princeton and the rest of the eventual Ivy League faded out of national championship contention. The Tigers won their last national championship in 1950 when Dick Kazmaier, the 1951 Heisman Trophy winner, was a junior.

=== Formation of the Ivy League ===
When Princeton joined Brown, Columbia, Cornell, Harvard, and Yale Universities, Dartmouth College, and the University of Pennsylvania in formally organizing the Ivy League athletic conference in 1955, conference rules prohibited post-season play in football. (Princeton never competed in the post-season.) The policy further insulated Princeton and the Ivy League from the national spotlight.

Until the 2025 football season, when Ivy League football teams were finally allowed to participate in post season play.

Despite an undefeated season in 1964, Princeton was not among the top 10 teams in the season-ending Associated Press poll.

=== NCAA Division I subdivision split ===
The NCAA split Division I collegiate football into two subdivisions in 1978, then called I-A for larger schools, and I-AA for the smaller ones. The NCAA had devised the split, in part, with the Ivy League in mind, but the conference did not move down for 4 seasons. Unable to play competitively against long-time rival Rutgers anymore, Princeton stopped scheduling them as a football opponent after 1980. Then in 1982 the NCAA created a rule that stated a program's average attendance must be at least 15,000 to qualify for I-A membership. This forced the conference's hand, as only some of the member schools met the attendance qualification. Choosing to stay together rather than stand their ground separately in the increasingly competitive I-A subdivision, the Ivy League moved down into I-AA starting with the 1982 season. Despite often finishing its seasons ranked in the championship subdivision, Princeton was unable to play in the NCAA Division I Football Championship per Ivy League rules. Those rules changed beginning with the 2025 season, with the Ivies now being eligible for the FCS postseason.

=== Recent history ===
Since the formation of the Ivy League, Princeton has achieved moderate success on the gridiron, with 11 Ivy League championships, three outright and eight shared, and 10 Big Three championships since 1955. In 2009, Princeton hired Bob Surace. Surace was an All-Ivy league center at Princeton and graduated in 1990.

On the heels of a 5-5 overall 2017 season record, Surace led the Tigers to a 10-0 undefeated season in 2018. Princeton won multiple games by double digits, with the exception of a close 14-9 win over Dartmouth on November 3, 2018. The Tigers followed-up with a 8-2 overall standing in 2019.

The Ivy League cancelled the 2020 season due to the COVID-19 pandemic. The league resumed play for the 2021 season.

== Championships ==
=== National championships ===
Princeton has won 28 national championships from NCAA-designated major selectors. Although they do not compete in the NCAA Division I Football Bowl Subdivision (FBS), they maintain claims to titles won at the highest level at the time, with retroactive championships for the 19th century, in which Princeton was declared champion for 20 different seasons in a 30-year span from 1869 to 1899. All except the last title were won in the era prior to the Associated Press (AP) poll selecting champions starting in 1936, with the final national championship claim coming from a different poll than the AP. On some occasions, Princeton shared a championship with other teams, with as many as four other teams claiming a championship for certain years, such as 1922, when six teams were given a title in some form with only one tie separating the five unbeaten teams including Princeton. Princeton claims all 28 titles.

Season	Coach	Selector	Record
1869	No coach	Billingsley Report, National Championship Foundation, Parke Davis	1–1
1870	No coach	Billingsley Report, National Championship Foundation, Parke Davis	1–0
1872	No coach	Billingsley Report, National Championship Foundation, Parke Davis	1–0
1873	No coach	Billingsley Report, National Championship Foundation, Parke Davis	1–0
1874	No coach	Billingsley Report, Parke Davis	2–0
1875	No coach	Billingsley Report, Parke Davis	2–0
1877	No coach	Billingsley Report, Parke Davis	2–0–1
1878	No coach	Billingsley Report, National Championship Foundation, Parke Davis	6–0
1879	No coach	Billingsley Report, National Championship Foundation, Parke Davis	4–0–1
1880	No coach	National Championship Foundation, Parke Davis	4–0–1
1881	No coach	Billingsley Report, Parke Davis	7–0–2
1884	No coach	Billingsley Report, Parke Davis	9–0–1
1885	No coach	Billingsley Report, Helms Athletic Foundation, Houlgate System, National Championship Foundation, Parke Davis	9–0
1886	No coach	Billingsley Report, Parke Davis	7–0–1
1889	No coach	Billingsley Report, Helms, Houlgate, National Championship Foundation, Parke Davis	10–0
1893	No coach	Billingsley Report, Helms, Houlgate, National Championship Foundation	11–0
1894	No coach	Houlgate	8–2
1896	Franklin Morse	Billingsley Report, Helms, Houlgate, National Championship Foundation, Parke Davis	10–0–1
1898	No coach	Parke Davis	11–0–1
1899	No coach	Billingsley, Parke Davis	12–1
1903	Art Hillebrand	Billingsley, Helms, Houlgate, National Championship Foundation, Parke Davis	11–0
1906	Bill Roper	Helms, National Championship Foundation	9–0–1
1911	Bill Roper	Billingsley MOV, Helms, Houlgate, National Championship Foundation, Parke Davis	8–0–2
1920	Bill Roper	Boand System, Parke Davis	6–0–1
1922	Bill Roper	Boand, College Football Researchers Association, National Championship Foundation, Parke Davis, Sagarin-ELO)	8–0
1933	Fritz Crisler	Parke Davis	9–0
1935	Fritz Crisler	Dunkel System	9–0
1950	Charlie Caldwell	Boand, Poling System	9–0

=== Conference championships ===
Princeton has won 12 conference championships, with four outright and eight shared.

Year	Conference	Coach	Overall record	Conference record
1957	Ivy League	Dick Colman	7–2	6–1
1963†	Ivy League	Dick Colman	7–2	5–2
1964	Ivy League	Dick Colman	9–0	7–0
1966†	Ivy League	Dick Colman	7–2	6–1
1969†	Ivy League	Jake McCandless	6–3	6–1
1989†	Ivy League	Steve Tosches	7–2–1	6–1
1992†	Ivy League	Steve Tosches	8–2	6–1
1995	Ivy League	Steve Tosches	8–1–1	5–1–1
2006†	Ivy League	Roger Hughes	9–1	6–1
2013†	Ivy League	Bob Surace	8–2	6–1
2016†	Ivy League	Bob Surace	8–2	6–1
2018	Ivy League	Bob Surace	10–0	7–0
2021†	Ivy League	Bob Surace	9–1	6–1

† Co-championship

== Rivalries ==
=== Harvard ===
Princeton leads the series with Harvard 55–48–7.

=== Rutgers ===
Princeton has an historical rivalry with Rutgers (1869–1980).

== Stadium and facilities ==
=== Palmer Stadium ===
In 1914, Princeton built Palmer Stadium, the third college football stadium ever built and what was the second oldest standing college stadium until its demolition in 1996. Palmer Stadium was modeled after the Greek Olympic stadium and seated 45,750 spectators. In the 1990s the university decided to demolish it for a new stadium rather than undertake a long and expensive renovation process, as Harvard had with its stadium in 1984.

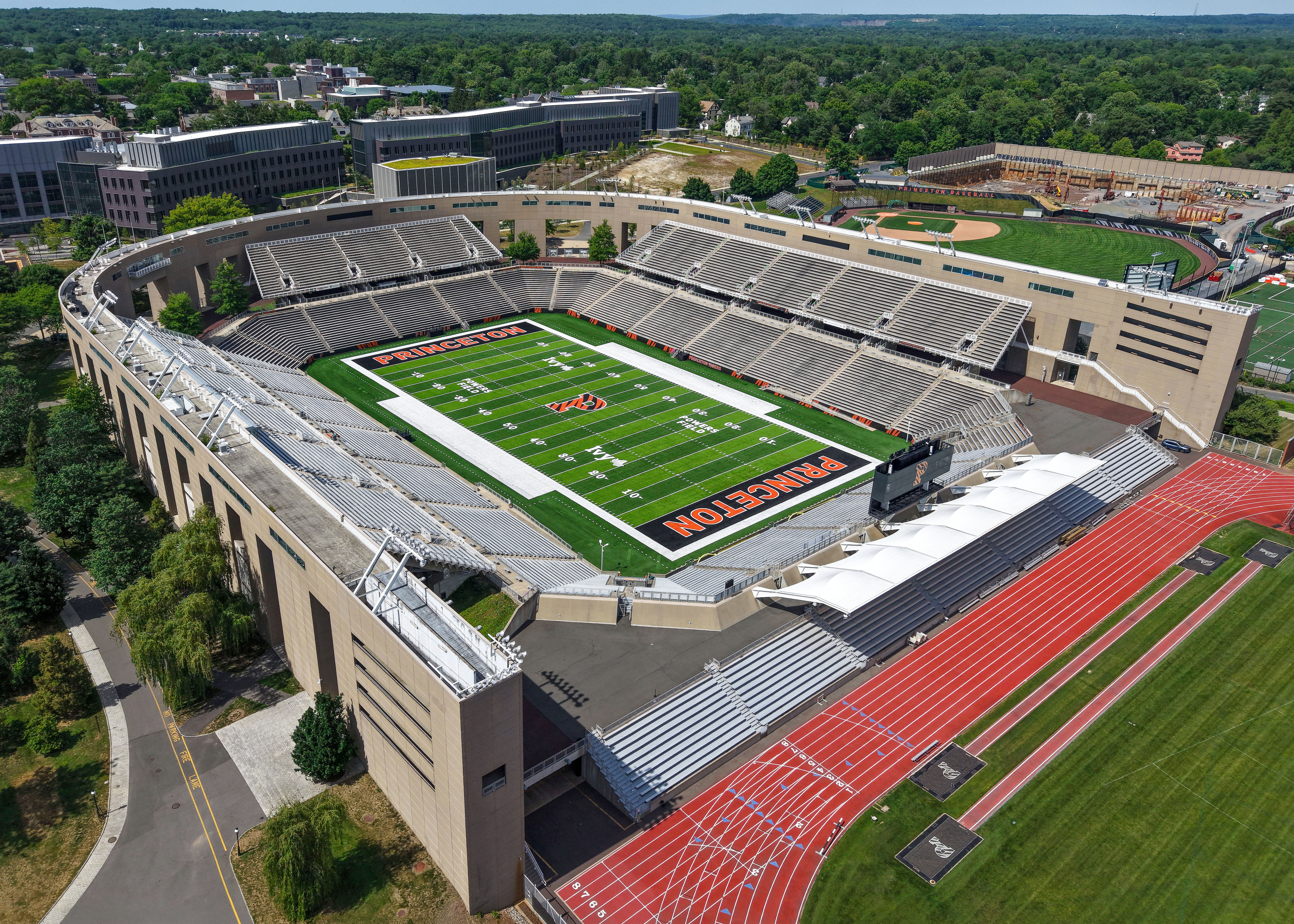
Princeton Stadium

=== Princeton Stadium ===
During the construction of the new stadium, the Tigers played a season of nine away games, plus a homecoming game against Yale at Giants Stadium in 1997. Princeton Stadium opened on September 19, 1998, and seats 27,773. After eight years of natural grass fields, FieldTurf artificial playing surface was installed for the 2006 football season and the field was named "Powers Field" in honor of William C. Powers, Princeton class of 1979, who was an All-Ivy punter for the Tigers and donated $10 million to the football program that year.

=== Practice facilities ===
The Finney-Campbell practice fields to the east of Princeton University Stadium have been outfitted with FieldTurf. They consist of nearly 1,600 square feet (150 m^{2}) of playing surface, with two full football fields and lines for men's and women's lacrosse.

== Future non-conference opponents ==
Announced schedules as of January 22, 2026.

2026	2027	2028	2029	2030	2031
at Bryant	Lehigh	at Lehigh	Lehigh	at North Carolina A&T	North Carolina A&T
Albany	at Albany	Monmouth	at Monmouth		
at Wagner	Wagner	at Howard	Howard		
