= 1872 Grand National =

English steeplechase horse race

- Grand National
- Location: Aintree
- Date: 21 March 1872
- Winning horse: Casse Tete
- Starting price: 20/1
- Jockey: John Page
- Trainer: A. Cowley
- Owner: Teddy Brayley
- Conditions: Firm

The 1872 Grand National was the 34th renewal of the Grand National horse race that took place at Aintree near Liverpool, England, in 1872.

== The Course ==
For the second consecutive year, the experienced jockeys returned to say the fences appeared even smaller than last year, although they praised the state of the ground as excellent, save for a piece of plough leading to the canal. It was also made clear in the press this year that one of the two fences between Becher's Brook and the Canal Turn had now been removed. The Fence at the Canal Turn itself was now known as the second post and rails.

First circuit: From the start, the runners had a long run away from the racecourse, across the lane towards Fence 1 {14} Ditch and Rails Fence 2 {15} Ditch and Bank, modern reports of the race and era call this fence Fan, but contemporary reports do not use this term, Fence 3 {16} Double Rails, Fence 4 {17} Rails and Ditch, Fence 5 {18} Becher's Brook Fence 6 {19} Post and Rails, in previous years a second post and rails was situated before the canal turn. However this was not present at this years race. Fence 7 {20} Second Post and Rails, situated at the Canal Turn but not widely referred to as that in contemporary reports, Fence 8 {21} Valentine's Brook, Fence 9 {22} Drop, Fence 10 {23} Post and Rails, Fence 11 {24} Table Bank, formerly the table jump, the fence on top of the bank had been removed some years earlier and this year the slopes of the bank had been reduced.

The runners then crossed the lane at the canal bridge to re-enter the racecourse proper, turning at the first opportunity towards the fences in front of the stands. Fence 12 Made Thorn, Fence 13 Stand Water.

Second circuit: The runners then turned away from the Grandstands again and crossed the lane again, following the first circuit until reaching the racecourse again. This time the runners continued to the wider extreme of the course after crossing the lane at canal bridge before turning to run up the straight in front of the stands where two hurdles, Fence 25 and Fence 26 had to be jumped

The runners then bypassed the Made Thorn and Stand Water inside before reaching the winning post in front of the Main Stand.

The removal of one of the post and rails at the far end of the course now reduced the number of obstacles to twenty-six. Most were considered much smaller than in previous years while the Table Bank was little more than a small incline and decline in the course at Anchor Bridge Road crossing.

== Pre race and leading contenders ==
Despatch received late market interest to go off as the 100/30 favourite on George Waddington's tenth attempt to win the race, the pairing having finished second last year.

Cinderella was second favourite at 100/15, giving Jimmy Adams his third ride in the race. The brown mare was considered an old fashion type of chaser that might not last the distance of a modern Grand National. Despite this assessment she proved popular with the public.

Nuage was sent off at 8/1 with his price drifting slightly before the off due to appearing hard pulling and sweating up. The market still suggested that public felt rider, Hardy held the best chance of the eight debut riders scoring a victory.

Schiedam was 100/12 and despite being the stable's second string to Scalthene was the more attractive to the public. The mount would be John Maunsell Richardson's second in the race.

The Lamb was backed at 100/8 to become the first triple winner and was considered to be in better condition than when winning last year. Tommy Pickernell was now the most experienced rider in the race, becoming one of only nine rider in history to take part in eleven Grand Nationals up to that time.

Franc Luron was 100/6, offering a debut ride for Joe Cannon and had been well fancied at 14/1 on the morning of the race, his price drifted on course as the public didn't like the look of the horse.

Scarrington at 100/6 was Robert I'Anson's third ride in the race and widely considered by many of the press to be the best turned out horse on the day.

Primrose was at 100/6 and had been considered unlucky when her tongue went through her bit two years earlier, eventually finishing third but having used up far too much energy on the plough of the canal side. Her owner, William Brockton was on board that day and remained in the saddle, despite questions over his ability to control the mare.

Casse Tete at 25/1 was bidding for her third Grand National with, Johnny Page, winner in 1867 on board. Despite running well in preparation the previous day she had done little in her two previous Nationals and little anywhere else to suggest she could win and indeed her price went out from 20/1 shortly before the race. Others in the 25/1 bracket were Harvester, of whom there were pre race concerns over lameness, Marin for whom it was thought by many pundits that the race was coming too soon and that they would have been improved with another couple of weeks preparation, Master Mowbray whose price was considered fair for his chances and Rufus, who had tried to make all last year before fading in the closing stages.

Among the 66/1 outsiders was Hall Court, the duel runner up now appearing for a record seventh time in the race and considered entitled to a well earned retirement by the press.

The jockeys emerged this year from the newly built changing room and winners enclosure into a newly created saddling ring and paddock, which would remain in use into the early 21st century. Today the now old weighing room is a bar at the course.

== The Race ==
The field got away to a first time start with Royal Irish Fusilier the first of the twenty-five runners to clear the first fence without mishap. Snowstorm was the first to exit the contest at the second fence, his rider, Arthur Thorpe being so violently caught up in either the fall or the hooves landing around him that his boot was torn off. Meanwhile Ouragan II was already finding the pace too hot, detached from the remainder in the rear.

Royal Irish Fusilier and Rufus led at Bechers, where Primrose was pulling hard and suggesting what many had feared, that she might be too much for her rider to handle. Another difficult ride was Derby Day whose journey ended with a fall at the fence after the brook. Behind the three leaders came Despatch, with this quartet now about three lengths clear of The Lamb, Fleuriste, Nuage, Scalthene and Schiedam with a long tail forming of the other fourteen runners.

Nuage was rapidly pulled up after jumping the post and rails at the canal turn, Harding immediately dismounting to find the horse had broken a small bone in her hip, though the injury proved fatal only in terms of the mare's racing career. As ever, the plougland of the canal slowed the pace and allowed the field to bunch up approaching the table, which by this year barely resembled a fence at all and was little more than a rise in the ground, which signalled a return to the racecourse proper.

Twenty-two of the original twenty-five came to the bush fence beside the distance chair, where Primrose blundered before recovering well enough to take the stand water alongside Royal Irish Fusilier with Rufus third, followed by Fleuriste, Scots Grey, The Lamb, Scalthene and Philosopher, followed by Marin Harvester, Despatch, Schiedam, Scarrington and Master Mowbray, with Casse Tete, Hall Court, Acton heading the tail enders Franc Luron, Saucebox, Cinderella, Rhysworth and Ouragon II

At the second fence of the second circuit Primrose suffered a heavy fatal fall with Marin and Philosopher both brought down while Richardson's recovery from nearly falling on Schiedam was enough to effectively end any serious chance of victory. The Lamb looked certain to join the casualties but with remarkable agility, managed to jump the prone horses in front of her to continue. When the field had passed it was found that Primrose had suffered a broken back while her owner/rider, Brockton had two broken ribs and a severe cut to the head. Despite his injuries, he refused to leave his mount's side until her suffering was ended.

Royal Irish Fusilier began to tire going down to Bechers for the second time as Scarrington and Scots Grey overtook Rufus to lead over the brook where Rhysworth came down. Acton refused at the next, bringing down Franc Luron and Cinderella was going well when brought down by the loose Marin. The Lamb was now up in third and threatening the treble victory with Despatch, Rufus, Fleuriste, Master Mowbray, Scalthene, Casse Tete, and Harvester with five others now tailed off.

Scots Grey and Scalthene opened up a three length advantage over Scarrington on the plough of the canal side with Despatch, The Lamb, Fleuriste Harvester and Casse Tete moving up to take position for the home straight as Master Mowbray faded. At the last fence out on the country Harvester became the second horse to over reach in the race, breaking a small bone in his pastern joint and having to be immediately pulled up, though fortunately, like Nuage the injury was not severe enough to prove fatal.

Scots Grey and Scarrington had disposed of Scalthene by the time they crossed the table and re-entered the race course with The Lamb, Despatch and Casse Tete now running towards the penultimate hurdle in Indian file.

The Lamb and Casse Tete moved up to dispute the lead from Scots Grey and Scarrington over the first hurdle with Despatch just behind before Casse Tete went a length clear at the last. Despite clattering it, Casse Tete always appeared to have Scarrington at arms length, winning by six lengths with Despatch another six lengths down. The Lamb was another two lengths down in fourth

== Finishing Order ==
Position	Name	Jockey	Handicap (st-lb)	SP	Distance	Colours
Winner	Casse Tete	Johnny Page	10-0	25/1	6 Lengths	Red, yellow cap
Second	Scarrington	Robert I'Anson	100/6	100/6	6 Lengths	White, black sash and cap
Third	Despatch	George Waddington	10-4	100/30 Fav	2 Lengths	Cerise, white sash and cap
Fourth	The Lamb	Tommy Pickernell	12-7	100/8		Cerise, blue sleeves and cap
Fifth	Fleuriste	John Rickaby	10-10	40-1		Cerise, French grey sleeves and cap
Sixth	Master Mowbray	George Holman	10-12	25-1		Red and white hoops red cap
Seventh	Ouragan II	Alfred Holman	10-0	100/1		Blue, black cap
Eighth	Scaltheene	J Murphy	10-4	66/1		Tartan, yellow sleeves, green cap
Ninth	Schiedam	John Richardson	11-4	100/12		Tartan, yellow sleeves, yellow cap
Tenth	Saucebox	Whiteley	10-4	50-1		Blue
Eleventh	Scots Grey	G Moore	10-11	40/1	Pulled up after final hurdle and walked in	Purple, white cap
Twelfth	Rufus	James Potter	11-4	25-1	Walked in	Blue, orange sleeves, black cap
Thirteenth and last	Royal Irish Fusilier	T Andrews	10-6	100-1	Walked in	Red, blue sleeves, black cap
Fence 25 {Penultimate Hurdle}	Hall Court	Captain Hardinge Browne	10-0	100-1	Pulled up and walked in	Scarlet, white sash and cap
Fence 24 {Table}	Harvester	Arthur Yates	12-0	25-1	Over reached, broke a pastern joint, Pulled Up	Indigo
Fence 20 {2nd Post and Rails - Canal Turn}	Cinderella	Jimmy Adams	10-7	100-15	Brought Down	White, blue sleeves, red cap
Fence 19 {Post and Rails}	Acton	Joseph Rudd	10-7	50-1	Refused	Light blue, white sleeves, black cap
Fence 19 {Post and Rails}	Franc Luron	Joe Cannon	10-7	100-6	Brought Down	Yellow, purple sleeves, yellow cap
Fence 18 {Bechers Brook}	Rhyshworth	William Boxall	10-12	100/1	Fell	Pink, white cap
Fence 15 {Ditch and Bank -Fan}	Philosopher	G. Gray	10-6	100-1	Brought Down	Blue, tartan sash, red cap
Fence 15 {Ditch and Bank - Fan}	Marin	J. Cassidy	11-10	25-1	Brought Down	Brown, red cap
Fence 15 {Ditch and Bank - Fan}	Primrose	William Brockton	11-9	100-6	Fell Fatally {Broken Back}	Buff
Fence 7 {Second Post and Rails - Canal Turn}	Nuage	Harding	11-2	8/1	Over reached and pulled up, broken hip	Red, black sleeves and cap
Fence 6 {Post and Rails}	Derby Day	Dick Marsh	10-0	33-1	Fell	French grey, red cap
Fence 2 {Ditch and Bank - Fan}	Snowstorm	Arthur Thorpe	11-9	50-1	Fell	Pink

== Aftermath ==
Three horses suffered serious injury during the race with Primrose having to be destroyed after breaking her back while both Nuage and Harvester suffered a broken hip and pastern respectively through over reaching. Fortunately both fractures were survivable and contrary to some future histories of the race, neither was put down.

Despite walking in with the carriages, bypassing the final hurdles, Captain Hardinge Browne, regarded his only ride in the Grand National as a success, writing in his scrap book "My first ride at Liverpool. I got round - eleven horses fell." It's not known if Hardinge put Hall Court at the hurdles to officially complete the course.
