= 1872 Yale Bulldogs football team =

American college football season

1872 Yale Bulldogs football

Co-national champion (Davis)
- Conference: Independent
- Record: 1–0
- Head coach: None
- Captain: David Schley Schaff
- Home stadium: Hamilton Park

1872 college football records
	Conf.			Overall
Team	W	L	T	W		L		T
Princeton		–		1	–	0	–	0
Yale		–		1	–	0	–	0
Rutgers		–		1	–	1	–	1
Columbia		–		1	–	2	–	1
Stevens		–		0	–	1	–	0

The 1872 Yale Bulldogs football team was a football team that represented Yale University in the 1872 college football season. The team (which played a game based on the association football laws) finished with a 1–0 record and was retroactively named co-national champion by Parke H. Davis.

They played Columbia at Hamilton Park and won 3–0. Each team had 20 players and the field was 400 feet long and 250 wide (134 by 83 yards). Tommy Sherman scored the first goal and Lew Irwin the other two. The team's captain was David Schley Schaff, who attended the Rugby School in England where he learned to play football.

== Schedule ==
Date	Time	Opponent	Site	Result	Attendance	Source
November 16	2:45 p.m.	Columbia	Hamilton Park; New Haven, CT	W 3–0	400	

== See also ==
- List of the first college football game in each US state
