= 1870 Princeton Tigers football team =

American college football season

1870 Princeton Tigers football

National champion
- Conference: Independent
- Record: 1–0
- Head coach: None
- Captain: Alexander Van Rensselaer

1870 college football records
	Conf.			Overall
Team	W	L	T	W		L		T
Princeton		–		1	–	0	–	0
Rutgers		–		1	–	1	–	0
Columbia		–		0	–	1	–	0

The 1870 Princeton Tigers football team represented the College of New Jersey, then more commonly known as Princeton College, in the 1870 college football season. The team finished with a 1–0 record and was retroactively named the national champion by the Billingsley Report, National Championship Foundation, and Parke H. Davis. The Tigers played Rutgers one time and won 6–2. Alexander Van Rensselaer was the team's captain.

In 1871, Princeton College only played games versus Princeton Theological Seminary and there are no records of those games. No intercollegiate football games occurred that year. Princeton and Rutgers played again in 1872.

== Schedule ==
Date	Opponent	Site	Result
November 19	Rutgers	Princeton, NJ (rivalry)	W 6–2
