= 1872 Columbia football team =

American college football season

1872 Columbia football
- Conference: Independent
- Record: 1–2–1
- Head coach: None
- Captain: Alex B. Simonds

1872 college football records
	Conf.			Overall
Team	W	L	T	W		L		T
Princeton		–		1	–	0	–	0
Yale		–		1	–	0	–	0
Rutgers		–		1	–	1	–	1
Columbia		–		1	–	2	–	1
Stevens		–		0	–	1	–	0

The 1872 Columbia football team represented Columbia University in the 1872 college football season. The team had no head coach, and compiled a record of 1–2–1. Alex B. Simonds served as team captain.

== Schedule ==
Date	Time	Opponent	Site	Result	Attendance	Source
November 2		Rutgers	New York, NY	T 0–0		
November 9		at Rutgers	New Brunswick, NJ	L 5–7		
November 16	2:45 p.m.	at Yale	Hamilton Park; New Haven, CT	L 0–3	400	
November 23		Stevens	New York, NY	W 6–0		

== See also ==
- List of the first college football game in each US state
