= 1872 Princeton Tigers football team =

American college football season

1872 Princeton Tigers football

National champion (Billingsley, NCF) Co-national champion (Davis)
- Conference: Independent
- Record: 1–0
- Head coach: None
- Captain: David T. Marvel

1872 college football records
	Conf.			Overall
Team	W	L	T	W		L		T
Princeton		–		1	–	0	–	0
Yale		–		1	–	0	–	0
Rutgers		–		1	–	1	–	1
Columbia		–		1	–	2	–	1
Stevens		–		0	–	1	–	0

The 1872 Princeton Tigers football team represented the College of New Jersey, then more commonly known as Princeton College, in the 1872 college football season. The team finished with a 1–0 record and was retroactively named the national champion by the Billingsley Report and National Championship Foundation and as the national co-champion by Parke H. Davis. Princeton played Rutgers once, winning 4 goals to 1. David T. Marvel was the team captain.

This season marked the first of four consecutive national championships, and one of 11 in a 13-year period between 1869 and 1881.

== College soccer ==
The 1872 team is also considered the 1872–73 college soccer champions by the American Soccer History Archives, due to the similarity of footballing codes between American and association football (soccer) during the 1870s.

== Schedule ==
Date	Opponent	Site	Result
November 23	Rutgers	Princeton, NJ (rivalry)	W 4–1
