= Bill Roper (American football) =

American athlete and coach (1880–1933)

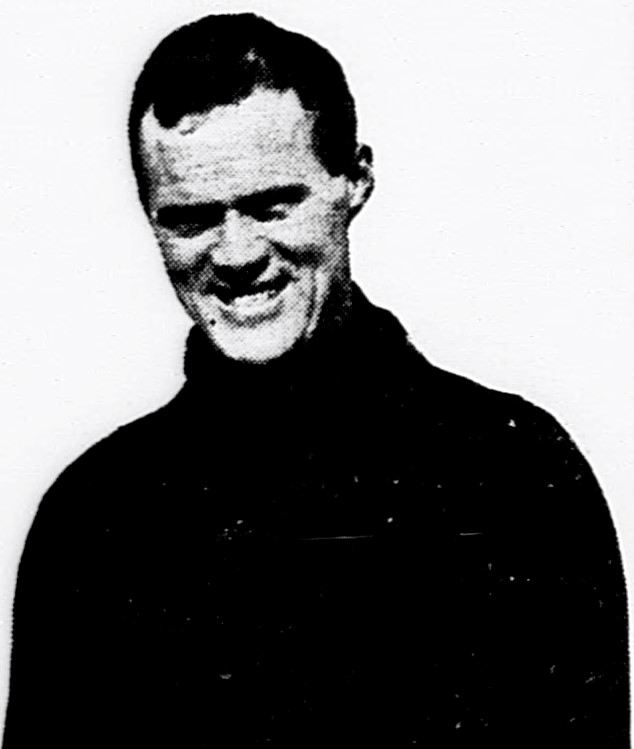
- Roper in 1909

Biographical details
- Born: August 22, 1880; Philadelphia, Pennsylvania, U.S.
- Died: December 19, 1933 (aged 53); Philadelphia, Pennsylvania, U.S.

Playing career
- 1899–1902: Princeton
- Positions: End (football); Outfielder (baseball)

Coaching career (HC unless noted)

Football
- 1903–1904: VMI
- 1906–1908: Princeton
- 1909: Missouri
- 1910–1911: Princeton
- 1915–1916: Swarthmore
- 1919–1930: Princeton

Basketball
- 1902–1903: Princeton

Head coaching record
- Overall: 112–38–18 (football); 8–7 (basketball)

Accomplishments and honors

Championships
- Football; 4 national (1906, 1911, 1920, 1922); 1 MVC (1909)
- College Football Hall of Fame; Inducted in 1951 (profile)

William Winston Roper (August 22, 1880 – December 10, 1933) was an American football, basketball, and baseball player and coach.

He served as the head football coach at the Virginia Military Institute (1903–1904), Princeton University (1906–1908, 1910–1911, 1919–1930), the University of Missouri (1909), and Swarthmore College (1915–1916), compiling a career college football record of 112–38–18. Roper's Princeton Tigers football teams of 1906, 1911, 1920, and 1922 have been recognized as national champions, and his 89 wins are the most of any coach in the history of the program.

Roper was also the head basketball coach at Princeton for one season in 1902–03, tallying a mark of 8–7. Roper played football as an end, basketball, and baseball as an outfielder at Princeton, from which he graduated in 1902. He was inducted into the College Football Hall of Fame as a coach in 1951.

Roper served on the NCAA Football Rules Committee.

== Early life and playing career ==
Roper was born in Philadelphia, Pennsylvania, on August 22, 1880. He attended the William Penn Charter School where he played football, basketball, and baseball, and continued all three sports in college at Princeton University.

== Coaching career ==
=== VMI ===
Roper was the sixth head football coach at Virginia Military Institute (VMI) in Lexington, Virginia, serving for two seasons, from 1903 to 1904, and compiling a record of 5–6. Roper had planned to study medicine, but was unable to, for health reasons. While a coach at VMI, he studied law, and later in life he became qualified as an attorney.

=== Princeton ===
In 1906, Roper was the head coach at Princeton and held that position through the 1908 season. During his first stint as the head coach at Princeton, he compiled a 21–4–4 record.

=== Missouri ===
Roper coached football at the University of Missouri for the 1909 season, where his team went 7–0–1 and won the Missouri Valley Conference title.

=== Return to Princeton ===
His second stint at Princeton lasted from 1910 to 1911. During that tenure, he compiled a 15–1–2 record.

=== Swarthmore ===
In 1915 and 1916, Roper coached at Swarthmore College in Pennsylvania. In his two seasons at Swarthmore, the team compiled a record of 11–4–1.

=== Third term at Princeton ===
In his final stint at Princeton, Roper held his longest-tenured coaching position. His term lasted from 1919 to 1930, but ended due to an illness. He continues to hold the record for most wins by a Princeton coach.

== William Winston Roper Trophy ==
Princeton University's highest honor for a male athlete, the William Winston Roper Trophy, is named in his honor and awarded annually. Some of the more recent honorees have included NFL football player Dennis Norman (’01), lacrosse player Ryan Boyle (‘04), Olympic and world champion fencer Soren Thompson (‘05), MLB baseball player Will Venable (‘05), squash player Yasser El Halaby ('06), and lacrosse player Peter Trombino ('07).

== Political and business career ==
In 1912, United States President Woodrow Wilson appointed Roper as the appraiser of merchandise at the Port of Philadelphia. He was later a member of the Philadelphia City Council and the local manager of the Prudential Insurance Company. As a politician, he worked successfully to repeal prohibition, though he himself was a teetotaller, and to change Pennsylvania's blue laws, which did not allow sports on Sundays.

== Head coaching record ==
=== Football ===
Year	Team	Overall	Conference	Standing
VMI Keydets (Independent) (1903–1904)
1903	VMI	2–1		
1904	VMI	3–5		
VMI:		5–6		
Princeton Tigers (Independent) (1906–1908)
1906	Princeton	9–0–1		
1907	Princeton	7–2		
1908	Princeton	5–2–3		
Missouri Tigers (Missouri Valley Conference) (1909)
1909	Missouri	7–0–1	4–0–1	1st
Missouri:		7–0–1		
Princeton Tigers (Independent) (1910–1911)
1910	Princeton	7–1		
1911	Princeton	8–0–2		
Swarthmore Quakers (Independent) (1915–1916)
1915	Swarthmore	5–3		
1916	Swarthmore	6–1–1		
Swarthmore:		11–4–1		
Princeton Tigers (Independent) (1919–1930)
1919	Princeton	4–2–1		
1920	Princeton	6–0–1		
1921	Princeton	4–3		
1922	Princeton	8–0		
1923	Princeton	3–3–1		
1924	Princeton	4–2–1		
1925	Princeton	5–1–1		
1926	Princeton	5–1–1		
1927	Princeton	6–1		
1928	Princeton	5–1–2		
1929	Princeton	2–4–1		
1930	Princeton	1–5–1		
Princeton:		89–28–16		
Total:		112–38–18		
National championship Conference title Conference division title or championship game berth

== See also ==
- List of college football head coaches with non-consecutive tenure
