= 1871 college football season =

American college football season

- Total No. of teams: 0
- Regular season: None
- Champion: None

The 1871 college football season is the only year since the first season in 1869 in which no games were played.

Princeton did play several games against a Princeton Theological Seminary team in 1871, although the Tigers considered these "practice" (or exhibition) games, and the general convention is not to count these as official games.

Only two college football games had been played in each of the previous seasons (1869 and 1870) by only three teams (Rutgers, Princeton, and Columbia).

There are accounts of a competitive game played between the University of Virginia and Washington & Lee University in 1871, but no score or statistics are known.

Because no games were played, 1871 is the only year since college football play began in which no college football national champion has been named, retroactively or otherwise.
