= 1870 college football season =

American college football season

- Total No. of teams: 3
- Regular season: November 5–12, 1870
- Champion: Princeton

The 1870 college football season is regarded as the second United States intercollegiate football season. The season involved only three teams and two known games which took place in November 1870. As in 1869, the season's two games occurred about fifteen miles apart in New Brunswick and in Princeton, New Jersey.

== Background ==
A year after the first intercollegiate football games occurred between Rutgers College (now Rutgers University) and College of New Jersey (now Princeton University), a third team – Columbia College (now Columbia University) – joined them.

== Rules ==
The rules at this time were based on the football rules published by the London Football Association in 1863. These rules were the precursor to the modern rules of football (soccer), but they included elements similar to rugby football that would be important in the evolution of American football.

Teams scored "goals" by kicking a round ball between two goal posts on a goal line. The ball was advanced by kicking it, although passes to players in front of the ball were not permitted.

Under the 1863 Association rules, any player could catch a ball that had been kicked or had bounced only one time but could not run with the ball. Following such a catch, that player could pass the ball to another player or have a free kick from that spot. If a ball passed the goal line without going between the posts, the team whose player touched it first was awarded a free kick. If that team was the defending team, the free kick was taken from the point on the goal line closest to where the defending team touched the ball. If that team was the attacking team, it took the free kick from the spot that was 15 yards from the point on the goal line closest to where the attacking team touched the ball.

The Association rules left certain fundamental rules of the game unspecified. The rules did not specify the size of each team, the duration of a game or whether play would be subject to breaks. These and other matters were agreed by teams (or stipulated by the home team) prior to each game. As such, the Association rules introduced a certain uniformity to the rules of football, but much like football played in English public schools at the time, the actual rules applied varied somewhat game-to-game.

== Season summary ==
On Saturday November 5, Rutgers beat Columbia 6–3 on the Rutgers' campus in New Brunswick, New Jersey. A week later, on November 12, Princeton defeated Rutgers 6–2 on the Princeton campus in Princeton, New Jersey, in a rematch of 1869's two-game series.

Princeton was the only one of the three teams that did not suffer a defeat in 1870 and is thus able to claim to have had the first undefeated season, albeit having played only one game. Although it would be several decades before the idea of a "national champion" would take hold, the NCAA has recognized three poll selectors – the Billingsley Report, the National Championship Foundation, and Parke H. Davis – that retroactively awarded Princeton the 1870 college football national championship.

== Intramural football ==
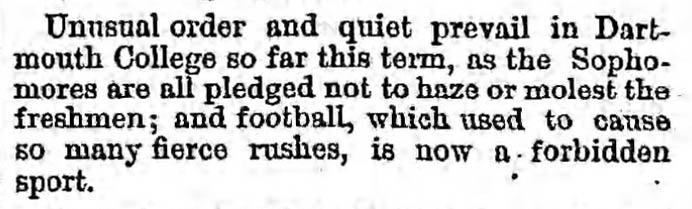
Article on The Brooklyn Daily Eagle reporting the ban of football at Dartmouth University, 11 Oct 1870

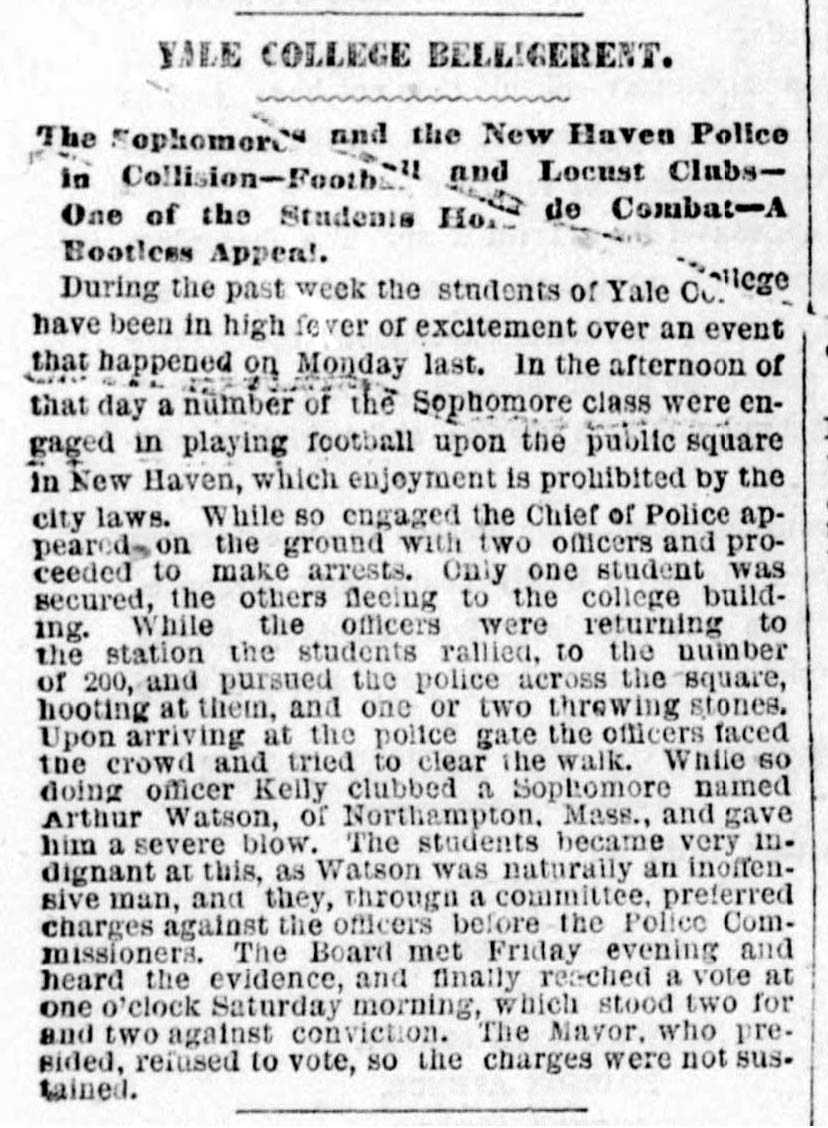
"Yale College belligerent" told the incident between students of Yale who played football (prohibited in New Haven) and the local police on The New York herald, 10 Nov 1870

Although only three teams participated in intercollegiate football in 1870, football was played, as it had been for many years and with varying degrees of acceptance, at other schools in the north-eastern United States. At Vermont, the annual football game between the freshman and sophomore classes was held on 5 October. At Dartmouth, the faculty initially banned the sport in autumn 1870, but reversed course in late October. On October 29, the faculty permitted a football match to be held, for which the school furnished the balls, made the regulations and appointed an umpire.

Other schools, such as Yale and Harvard, banned the game outright. On 31 October, a Yale student was arrested after a group of sophomores were caught playing football on New Haven Green. Following the arrest, a group of 200 students gathered outside the police station and one student, Arthur Watson, was seriously injured after being clubbed over the head by a policeman (Officer Kelly). A committee of students complained to the Police Commissioners who split 2–2 (the Mayor abstained) on bringing charges against the officers.

== Conference and program changes ==
Team	Former conference	New conference
Columbia	Program established	Independent

== Conference standings ==
1870 college football records
	Conf.			Overall
Team	W	L	T	W		L		T
Princeton		–		1	–	0	–	0
Rutgers		–		1	–	1	–	0
Columbia		–		0	–	1	–	0
