= 1872 college football season =

American college football season

- Total No. of teams: 5
- Regular season: November 2 – November 23
- Champion(s): Princeton; Yale

The 1872 college football season is considered to be the third season ever played of intercollegiate football competition, due to no season taking place (no games played) in 1871. Much like in the first and second years, 1869 and 1870, the rules were still considered in flux, and were decided on in a game-to-game basis. However, the rules used likely did not resemble anything that a modern football observer would recognize, being that of a mix of soccer and rugby.

In addition to the three teams competing in the 1870 season (Columbia, Rutgers, and Princeton), there were the two additional teams of Stevens Tech and Yale competing, to bring the total number of teams up to five.

== Regular season ==
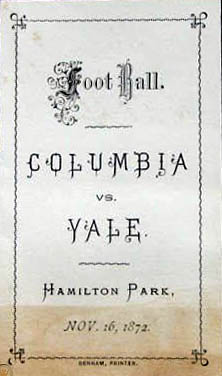
Program of the first Columbia vs Yale game

The five game season began on November 2, 1872, with the first college football game tie, in a 0–0 contest between Rutgers and Columbia on Columbia's campus. Organized intercollegiate football was first played in the state of Connecticut on November 16. It was the first game in New England. The game was essentially soccer with 20-man sides, played on a field 400 by 250 feet. Yale won 3–0, Tommy Sherman scoring the first goal and Lew Irwin the other two.

The season ended on November 23, 1872, with the fifth and final game of the year, a 6–0 win of Columbia over Stevens Tech in Stevens Tech's first official game that they played as an institution. Over the course of the season, there were only 5 total games played.

1872 saw the first time that two teams finished with an undefeated record (both 1–0). Princeton and Yale are generally considered to have (retroactively) split the college football national championship for play during the 1872 season. The Billingsley Report and the National Championship Foundation named Princeton as the national champion, while football research historian Parke H. Davis named it a split title.

== Conference and program changes ==
Team	Former conference	New conference
Yale Bulldogs	Program established	Independent
Stevens	Program established	Independent

== Standings ==
1872 college football records
	Conf.			Overall
Team	W	L	T	W		L		T
Princeton		–		1	–	0	–	0
Yale		–		1	–	0	–	0
Rutgers		–		1	–	1	–	1
Columbia		–		1	–	2	–	1
Stevens		–		0	–	1	–	0
