= History of Vanderbilt Commodores football =

History of American football team

The Vanderbilt Commodores football team represents Vanderbilt University in the sport of American football.

== Overview ==
=== Early history (1890–1974) ===
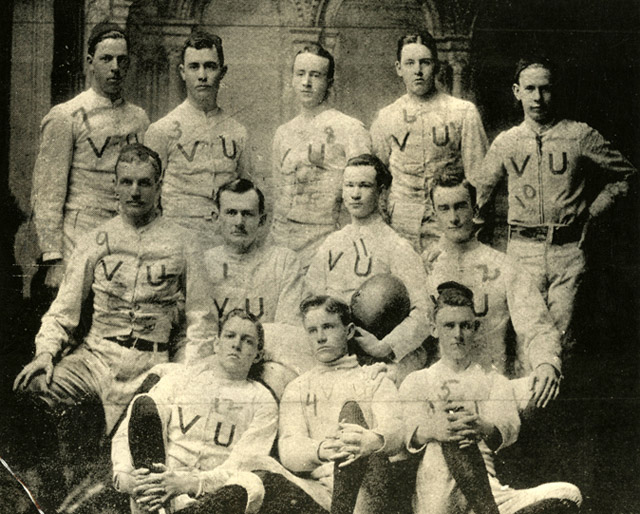
Vanderbilt's first football team

Vanderbilt and the University of Nashville played the first college football game in the state of Tennessee in 1890. In late 1894, Vanderbilt was among the seven founding members of the Southern Intercollegiate Athletic Association (SIAA). Just after the turn of the century, the team enjoyed fairly substantial success, with a composite record of 20–3–2 from 1901 –1903.

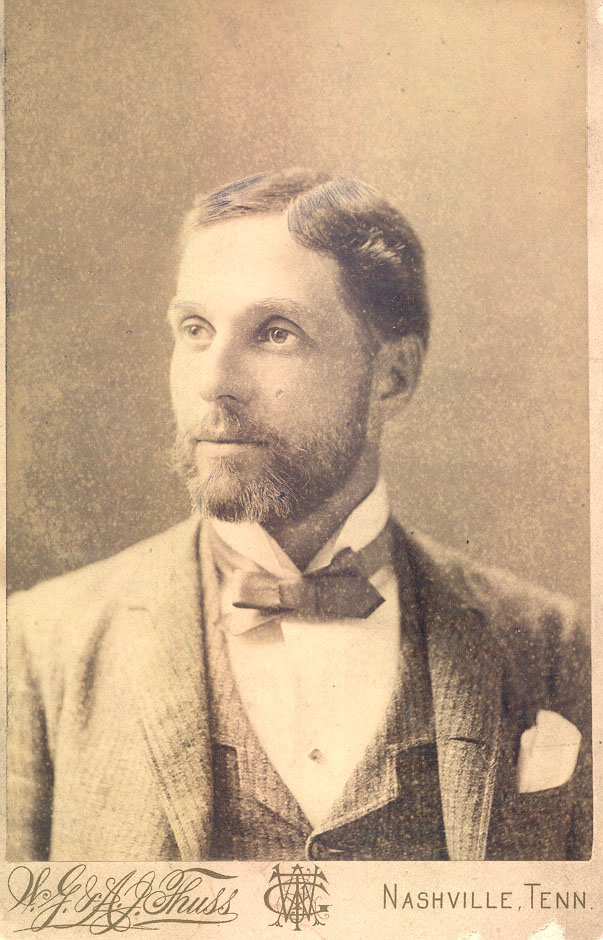
William Lofland Dudley

Chemistry professor William Lofland Dudley was known as the "father of Vanderbilt football." Dudley was a member of the Vanderbilt Athletic Association, formed in 1886 with Dr. W. M. Baskerville as president. Most students at Vanderbilt were members. The early sports played on the Vanderbilt campus were baseball, bicycling, and track and field events. Dudley was primarily responsible for the formation of the Southern Intercollegiate Athletic Association. The first advance in the direction of its formation was in March 1888 when the Vanderbilt Athletic Association endeavored to secure track and field meets at Vanderbilt from Southwestern Presbyterian University, Sewanee, and Tennessee. Sewanee's opposition stopped it from occurring. On December 21, 1894, the SIAA was formed.

Vanderbilt played its first football game in 1890 at Nashville Athletic Park, against Nashville (Peabody). Vanderbilt won 40–0. Horace E. Bemis was the leading scorer. Captain and fullback Elliott Jones, who had played football before in Boston, recalled the meeting which beget the game. Dudley called for a meeting of the Athletic Association, after Peabody had issued a challenge to play a contest on Thanksgiving Day. He felt the challenge a serious matter; that the pride of the university was at stake. In front of some 150 students in the gymnasium, Dudley explained that if the challenge were met, a new era of athletics would be created with the game of football. From his Kansas City law office many years later Jones remembered: "There followed a general discussion of the whole situation. The difficulties, particularly the shortness of time for preparation, and the fact that regular football had not been theretofore played at Vanderbilt at all, were dealt upon. Many thought that it would be unfair to ourselves to hazard a contest under the circumstances. We knew that Peabody Normal had been playing intramural football for several years. The predominating note, however, for discussion was that we had never taken anything off Peabody Normal and should not do now. Finally, P. M. (Pat) Estes, then of St. Louis, made a motion to the effect that the challenge be accepted and that E. H. Jones be authorized and directed to organize and captain a team for the occasion. The motion was unanimously carried."

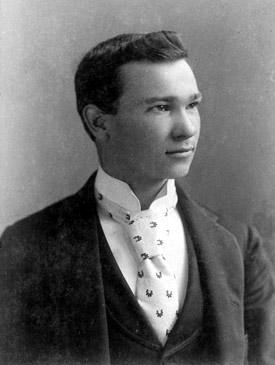
Elliott Jones

Of Dudley, Elliott Jones said:

"Too much cannot be said about Dr. William L. Dudley in connection with early football at Vanderbilt. Since college days his picture has adored my office wall, and when asked by any one who the gentleman is, I always reply, 'The best friend of myself and every other student at Vanderbilt, in my college days.' He went with the team on every trip, and watched over us like a father. "He was our inspiration as well as our guardian. He was our true and loyal friend, under any and all circumstances, in adversity as well in prosperity. I have never known a more lovable, more genuine friend. I cherish the memory of his friendship above all else in my college experience."

Vanderbilt's second ever game was the first instance of the Sewanee-Vanderbilt rivalry–at one time the south's oldest rivalry, on November 7, 1891. Vanderbilt won 22–0 in Sewanee, Tennessee at McGee Field. McGee Field is the oldest stadium in the south, and fourth oldest in the nation, still in use. Vanderbilt went 3–1 in 1891, playing two games each against Sewanee and Washington University in St. Louis. Its first ever loss occurred in that first game against WashU by a score of 24–6. Vanderbilt's football stadia have been named after Dudley for practically all of the program's existence. The first Dudley Field was christened on October 21, 1892 with the first instance of the Tennessee–Vanderbilt football rivalry. Vanderbilt won, 22–4. The Vanderbilt Law School presently occupies the old Dudley Field site. A second game against the Vols was played, this time in Knoxville, and Vanderbilt won 12–0. The quarterback for Vanderbilt that year, William E. Beard, dubbed the team the Commodores in the Nashville Banner in 1897. "Commodore" was the sobriquet of the university's namesake, Cornelius Vanderbilt. The 1892 season also includes Vanderbilt's first meeting with Georgia Tech. The 1892 team was the oldest team in Grantland Rice's memory. He felt Phil Connell then would be a good player in any era.

W. J. Keller took over as coach of the 1893 team, which lost only to Auburn. The includes the first meetings with Centre and rival Georgia. In 1894, Vanderbilt began one of its oldest rivalries: the Vanderbilt-Ole Miss rivalry. Vanderbilt won 40–0. The team suffered its only loss when it traveled up Louisville. In 1895, the first year of the SIAA, John Heisman's Auburn Tigers scored a touchdown with Reynolds Tichenor on a "hidden ball trick" as the Tigers seemed to run a revolving wedge. Vandy still won 9–6 in the first game in the south decided by a field goal. The 1896 team managed just a 3–2–2 record, but defeated rival Sewanee and played Kentucky (then known as Kentucky State) for the first time, a 6–0 win.

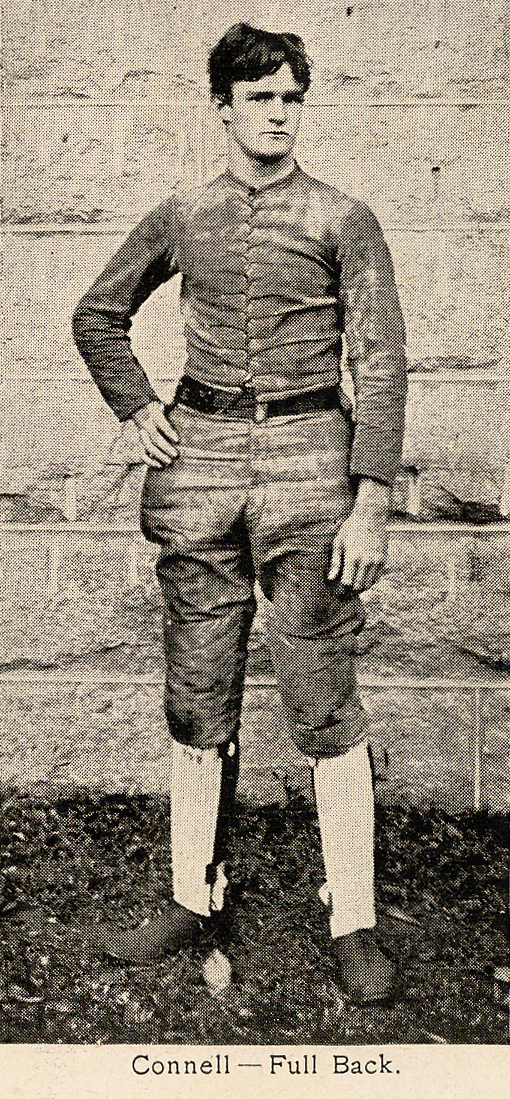
Caspar Whitney called Phil Connell (pictured) "the South's finest football player."

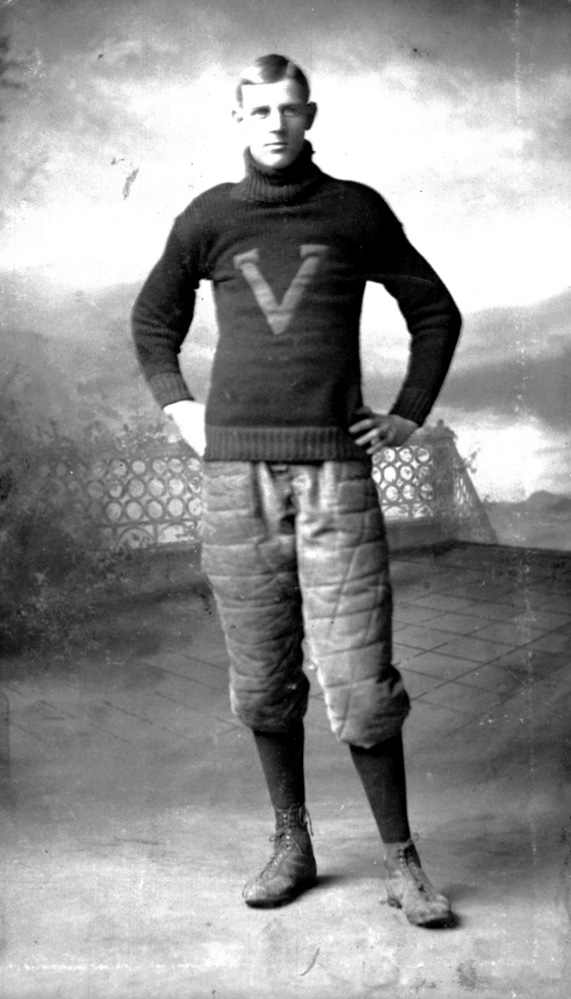
John J. Tigert in Vandy football uniform

The 1897 team coached by R. G. Acton won the school's first conference championship, going 3–0 in SIAA play, and may have been the school's best team up to that point. Not a point was a scored on the Commodores. They defeated Kentucky by its largest ever margin, 50–0. Virginia had also not lost to a southern team, and faced Vanderbilt in a battle for the south to close the season. The game ended in a scoreless tie. Connell and Lucius E. Burch were prominent members of the Commodores. Connell was called by Caspar Whitney the South's finest football player. The 1898 team had a disappointing 1–5 record, including a close loss to Georgia, the first ever to the Bulldogs. Georgia quarterback Kid Huff prevented Wallace Crutchfield, at that time "the biggest man that ever played on the Vanderbilt football team," from a Vandy score. Virginia's W. A. Lambeth selected halfback Jack Dye for his All-Southern team. The 1899 team was led at quarterback by Frank Godchaux, Sr. Frank Godchaux, Jr. was the first to follow in his father's footsteps as a Vanderbilt football player. Sportswriter Grantland Rice was a letterman on the 1899 team. Vanderbilt did not lose to a southern team and played its first ever match with Texas, but had its season overshadowed by Sewanee's "Iron Men" squad. Lambeth selected Crutchfield All-Southern, and Sewanee coach Billy Suter selected end Walter Simmons such. The 1900 season included a lackluster 4–4–1 record and a rematch at Fair Park in Dallas with Texas at the State Fair.

The 1901 team clinched the SIAA title when it defeated University of Nashville (Peabody) 10–0 on Thanksgiving Day. The 1901 Nashville team was arguably the best in its history; it defeated Sewanee 39–6 "and mopped up with about everything else." A riot broke out downtown the next day. According to the account of the event in the Nashville Banner (repudiated in the Hustler), the trouble started when a number of Vanderbilt students "tried to paint the stone fence of the University of Nashville yellow and black." The 1901 team also defeated Georgia by the largest margin of victory in the history of the contest, 47–0. The 1902 team defeated all opponents except for Sewanee. John Edgerton starred in the backfield. The 1903 season opened with an upset loss to Cumberland, but closed strong, including a victory over Sewanee. This season was also the first in which Vandy played Alabama. Nash Buckingham said Vanderbilt and Kentucky University (today Transylvania) should rank best in the south. Vanderbilt had two All-Southerns and Rhodes Scholars in Bob Blake and John J. Tigert. Tigert was the first Rhodes Scholar ever from Tennessee. Later a prominent coach and educator, he was inducted into the College Football Hall of Fame.

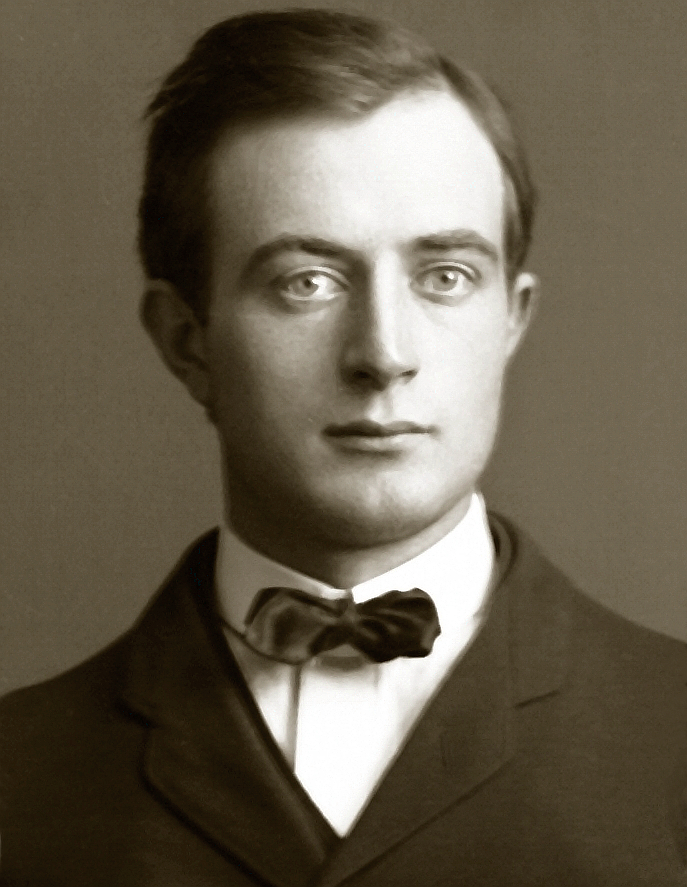
Coach McGugin

Dan McGugin's tenure spanned the years 1904 to 1917 and 1919 to 1934 with a record of 197–55–19. McGugin won 4 straight conference titles from 1904 to 1907, and three straight from 1910 to 1912 and from 1921 to 1923. From 1910 to 1912, McGugin's teams went 24–2–1 and outscored opponents by a combined 816–35 margin. He won the school's first major intersectional contests. Sportswriter Fuzzy Woodruff once wrote "The plain facts of the business are that McGugin stood out in the South like Gulliver among the native sons of Lilliput. There was no foeman worthy of the McGugin steel.” McGugin was named to the College Football Hall of Fame as part of its inaugural class. (Note: The Vanderbilt athletics office building, the McGugin Center, bears his name. McGugin was also named to the Vanderbilt Athletics Hall of Fame as part of its inaugural class.) Fred Russell wrote of McGugin:

For years he ruled supreme in Dixie, and his teams won many glorious intersectional victories. More than any one man, he was responsible for the progress of southern football.... He was the first coach to successfully work the onside kick. He was among the first to bring out guards in the interference.... His name will never die.

McGugin's arrival as coach from his brother-in-law Fielding H. Yost's Michigan program in 1904 showed an immediate impact. The inaugural 1904 squad outscored its opposition by 474–4 in winning all nine games. The average of 52.7 points per game led the nation. Vanderbilt defeated Centre 97–0.

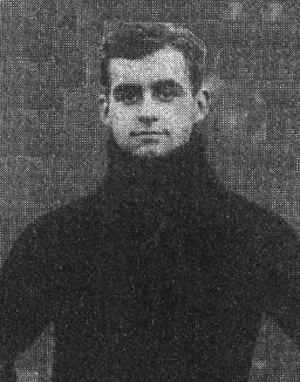
Owsley Manier

From 1903 to 1905, the Commodores outscore opponents 372–22 and posted a 22–2–1 record. In both 1905 and 1906, Vanderbilt played seven home games, winning all of them. The only loss in both cases came on the road at Michigan. The 1905 team beat Sewanee by the largest margin in school history, 68–4. The 1906 Vanderbilt team had one of the best seasons in school history, once ranked as the South's greatest team by 1905's captain Innis Brown. For some writers the 1906 Vanderbilt team made the entire All-Southern eleven. Seven of Vanderbilt's eight wins came by shutout. Only two teams scored on them all season. Vanderbilt outscored its opponents 278–16. Vanderbilt gave Texas, Sewanee, and Alabama their only loss, and defeated the Carlisle Indians 4–0, by a single Bob Blake field goal. for its first major intersectional victory, "the crowning feat of the Southern Intercollegiate Athletic Association season." The defeat of Alabama was 78–0. Vanderbilt had its first player ever selected All-American when Owsley Manier made Walter Camp's third team.

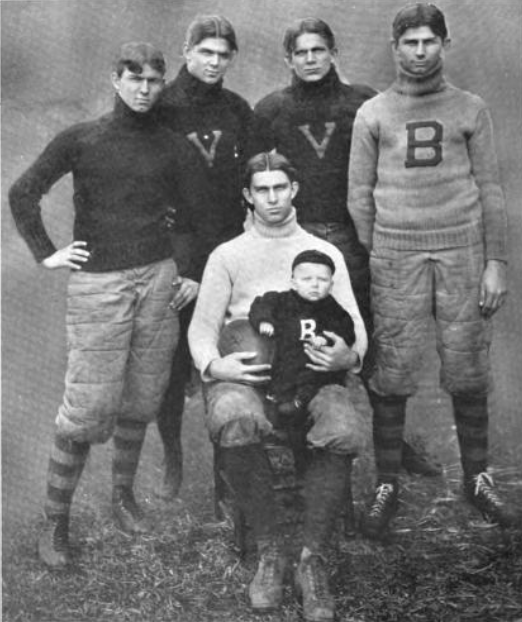
The Blake Brothers of Vanderbilt, including Frank, Bob, Dan, and Vaughn

The 1907 team tied Navy and again lost to Michigan, this time at home for the first home loss under McGugin. This snapped a 26-game home winning streak, and set a southern football attendance record of approximately 9,000. Vanderbilt faced one of Sewanee's greatest teams in its annual rivalry game which would decide the SIAA championship. It featured a 35-yard catch by Vanderbilt center Stein Stone, on a double-pass play then thrown near the end zone by Bob Blake that set up the 3-yard Honus Craig touchdown run to win at the very end. (Note: Michigan coach Fielding Yost selected Bob Blake first-team All-American.) The double pass was cited by Grantland Rice as the greatest thrill he ever witnessed in his years of watching sports. McGugin in Spalding's Football Guide's summation of the season in the SIAA wrote "The standing. First, Vanderbilt; second, Sewanee, a mighty good second;" and that Sewanee back Aubrey Lanier "came near winning the Vanderbilt game by his brilliant dashes after receiving punts."

The 1908 squad was hampered by a wealth of sophomores, which McGugin with the help of halfback Ray Morrison led to a 7–2–1 campaign, derailed from another SIAA title by the tie to Sewanee. After the 1909 team against lost to Sewanee, the 1910 team won the SIAA. Led by All-Southerns W. E. Metzger, Bill Neely, Ewing Y. Freeland and Ray Morrison, the 1910 Commodores battled defending national champion Yale to a scoreless tie on Yale Field. The 1911 team lost Neely but gained former Auburn running back Lew Hardage. It shutout all its opponents except Michigan, a loss on the road by a single point. Edwin Pope's Football's Greatest Coaches on the 1911 team reads "A lightning-swift backfield of Lew Hardage, Wilson Collins, Ammie Sikes, and Ray Morrison pushed Vandy through 1911 with only a 9–8 loss to Michigan." The Atlanta Constitution voted it the best backfield in the South. The 1912 team suffered its only loss at national champion Harvard and won the third SIAA title since 1910.

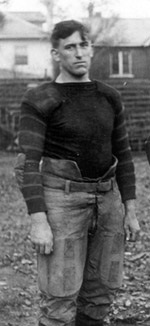
Cody at Vanderbilt

The 1913 team suffered the biggest loss to Michigan (33–2) and lost to SIAA champion Auburn. After McGugin's first losing season in 1914 and returning only ten players with experience, the 1915 team was a legitimate "point-a-minute" team, scoring 514 points in 510 minutes. The Commodores were led by All-Southerns Rabbit Curry, Josh Cody, and Russ Cohen. In the backfield with Curry was Johnny "Red" Floyd. The season featured the largest margin of victory over rival Ole Miss of 91–0 and an SIAA championship.

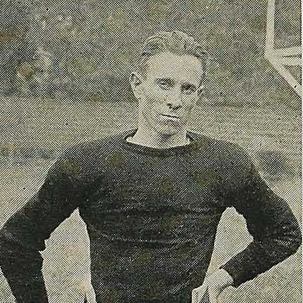
Irby "Rabbit" Curry

The 1916 team lost a game to decide the SIAA champion to rival Tennessee 10–6, despite outscoring the Vols on the season. Kentucky managed to upset Tennessee with a scoreless tie to end the season; yet Vanderbilt beat Kentucky on the road 45–0. The 1917 season had the first national champion from the south: John Heisman's Georgia Tech. Despite a decent 1917 Vanderbilt team, which for instance beat Alabama, the powerful Tech team gave Vanderbilt its worst loss in school history, 83–0 as Joe Guyon ran wild. The 1918 season was affected most by the First World War. In August, former star Curry died over French skies, devastating McGugin and Vanderbilt fans. During the season, Grailey Berryhill ran for six touchdowns in the largest margin of victory over Tennessee, 76–0, in a contest Tennessee disputes. Josh Cody was captain in 1919. Ties to Tennessee and Kentucky, and a loss to Georgia Tech, derailed the season early. Despite this the team closed fairly strong, including a victory over Virginia on Lambeth Field and handing the only losses to SIAA champion Auburn and Alabama. Fred Russell's Fifty Years of Vanderbilt Football gives the year of 1920 the title "One of Most Difficult Schedules." Georgia Tech led by Buck Flowers along with Red Barron ran up a 44–0 score on Vandy; and Auburn led by John Shirey along with Ed Sherling won by 56–6 in the "Frightful Fortnight" of Vanderbilt football. The team was back to form in 1921. Wallace Wade, a former Brown athlete, came over from Fitzgerald & Clarke School in Tullahoma, Tennessee where he won a state preparatory title; bringing with him future Vanderbilt stars Lynn Bomar and Hek Wakefield. With Wade as assistant the Commodores went 15–0–2 from 1921 to 1922. Clyde Berryman retroactively selected both the 1921 and 1922 teams national champions

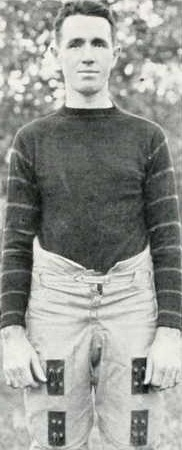
Wallace Wade at Vanderbilt

Vandy upset Texas 20–0 at the Texas State Fair. Edwin Pope's Football's Greatest Coaches tells us "The Texas game, sparked by McGugin's unforgettable oratory, was the big one; and Vandy got out of the year without a loss." "Instead of hammering detailed strategy into them," coach Dan McGugin had taken his team to the nearby grave of former Vanderbilt quarterback Irby "Rabbit" Curry in Marlin, Texas. In a noted speech just before the teams took the field, referring to this grave, McGugin tapped his fingers on the floor and told his boys:

You are about to be put to an ordeal which will show the stuff that's in you! What a glorious chance you have! Every one of you is going to fix his status for all time in the minds and hearts of his teammates today. How you fight is what you will be remembered by. If any shirk, the Lord pity him. He will be degraded in the hearts of the rest as long as they live...

The toughest Southern opponent left for either school and both with undefeated conference records, the Georgia–Vanderbilt game decided the SIAA title. Georgia had the greatest line in the South. (Note: It featured four All-Southern linemen: Puss Whelchel, Bum Day, Owen Reynolds, and Artie Pew. Not one team all year scored on Georgia through its line.) With all games in the series featuring shutouts, the score all time was 184–4 in the Commodores' favor, but this time Georgia was favored. (Note: Georgia was the favorite to win this first meeting of the two schools since 1912, for the Bulldogs may have outplayed Harvard and earlier defeated Auburn.)

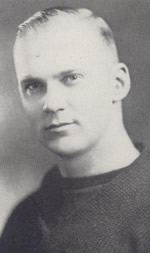
Lynn Bomar

Freshman Lynn Bomar had a breakout game from the linebacker position on defense. "Georgia would have trampled Vanderbilt to atoms but for Lynn Bomar," wrote Nashville Tennessean sportswriter Blinkey Horn. "Lynn Bomar was the stellar performer of the game. In the first-half he made two-thirds of the tackles", and reportedly prevented five Georgia touchdowns that day. Soon after the start of the fourth quarter, with Georgia up 7–0, Jess Neely intercepted a pass, weaving for a return of 25 yards to Georgia's 40-yard line before being brought down by Jim Reynolds. Two long pass attempts failed, and Thomas Ryan lined up to punt. Rupert Smith snuck in behind Ryan, and rushed to recover the 25-yard onside kick from scrimmage, jumping up to get the ball off the bounce among a hoard of Bulldogs, after they had let it bounce, including the outstretched arms of the Bulldogs' Hartley, and raced for a 15-yard touchdown. Rupert added his own extra point and the game ended as a 7–7 tie, giving both Vanderbilt and Georgia an equal right to the claim of a 1921 SIAA title (Note: Georgia went on to beat both Alabama and Clemson handily in the following weeks, while the next week Vanderbilt handled Sewanee in the "muddiest game" in Vanderbilt history.)

Vanderbilt finished 1922 undefeated in one of the best seasons in Vanderbilt and Southern football history. The Commodores allowed no points at home. This was also the year that Vanderbilt entered the Southern Conference as a charter member. Captain Jess Neely was one of the greatest ever and the team's best passer. Vanderbilt hosted the Michigan Wolverines to inaugurate Dudley Field and fought them to a scoreless tie which features prominent in the program's history. The game featured the nation's top two defenses as measured by points against per game, and included a goal line stand by Vanderbilt to sustain the tie. "Thousands of cheering Vanderbilt fans inspired the surge of center Alf Sharp, guard Gus Morrow, tackle Tex Bradford, and end Lynn Bomar, who stopped Michigan cold in four attempts." Vandy football historian Bill Traughber chronicles the event:

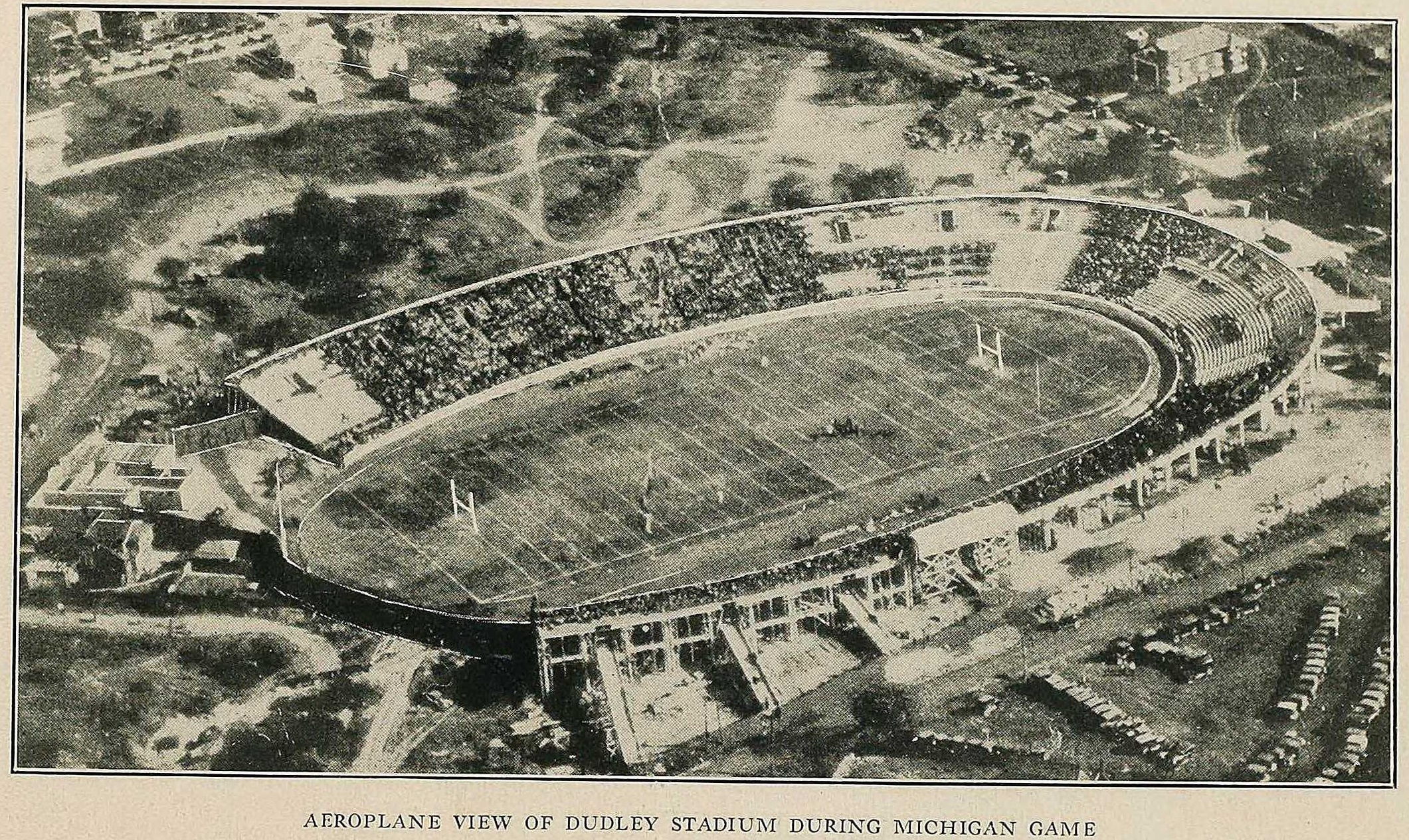
An aerial shot of Dudley Field during its dedication

The game between Vanderbilt and Michigan had a carnival-like atmosphere.

Dignitaries and politicians were invited to participate at Dudley Field, the largest football-only stadium in the South at that time. The guest of honor for the dedication game was Cornelius Vanderbilt, the great-great grandson of the university's namesake.

Accompanied by his wife, Vanderbilt arrived at Nashville's Union Station on the morning of the game, his first trip to the city. The day's first event was a luncheon for the young Vanderbilt couple, which was held at the Hermitage Hotel and hosted by Vanderbilt University Board of Trust.

Thousands of Vanderbilt students and alumni met downtown for a parade with Tennessee Governor Alf Taylor riding in the lead automobile. Decorated in orange and black, their automobile began the parade at Twelfth and Broadway, weaving through the side streets to a reviewing stand at the foot of the Capitol Building. (Note: A young Earnest Albert Craft, born in 1898, employed with the construction team that built the Dudley Field wooden stands was in attendance completing final work on Dudley Field the day of the game vs. Michigan. Earnest was called on to raise the first American flag during the national anthem. Later, Rev. Earnest Albert Craft would become city councilman of the West Nashville area and 40 year pastor of Sylvan Park Free Will Baptist Church in Nashville's historical Sylvan Park area. Clippings of this event were documented in the old Nashville Banner newspaper, a copy of which is held today by grandson by adoption, Albert D. Mitchell. Albert, named after Rev. Earnest Albert Craft, lives on the west side of Nashville in Bellevue.)

Wallace Wade left for the vacant head coaching position at Alabama. The Commodores again tied for the conference title in 1923 and continued to finish in the upper half of the conference standings for the next decade. Vanderbilt football has not won a conference championship since 1923; as of the 2014 season, it is one of the longest such droughts in FBS. The 1923 team beat Tennessee and Georgia by a combined 86–14. Lynn Bomar was selected first-team Walter Camp All-American. In 1956, Bomar was the first to be inducted into the College Football Hall of Fame as a Vanderbilt football player. 1924 saw Vanderbilt defeat a school in the North for the time (Carlisle was technically a prep school and the 1906 game was played at home) with a 16–0 victory over Minnesota at Memorial Stadium. It also saw the first victory over Georgia Tech in Atlanta since 1906 when Hek Wakefield drop kicked a field goal, and a tie of the powerful Quantico Marines. Wakefield was a consensus All American this season. Fred Russell dubs 1924 "the most eventful season in the history of Vanderbilt football," for it also features surprises such as Sewanee's final upset of Vanderbilt.

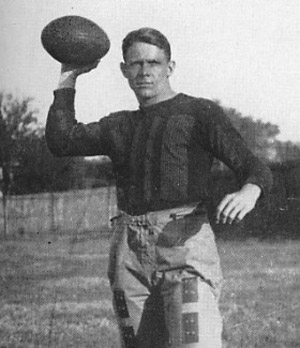
Bill Spears

"In 1925 McGugin came up with his finest quarterback in Bill Spears. Spears learned much from his coach and in three seasons had an unbelievably low number of interceptions He led the Commodores three years in which they only lost to Georgia Tech and Auburn in '25, national champion Alabama in '26. and Texas in '27." Grantland Rice said he was one of the fastest quarters he'd ever seen. Bill Hendrix led the SoCon in points scored in 1926, and Jimmy Armistead led the nation in points scored in 1927.

Armistead took Spears' spot at quarterback in 1928 and did admirably, ranked second-team All-Southern as Vanderbilt suffered its only two losses both to undefeated teams: Georgia Tech and Tennessee. Georgia Tech was national champion and Tennessee got its first win over Vanderbilt under coach Robert Neyland. Tackle Dick Abernathy was All-American. The team 1929 team again lost twice, to Tennessee against and to Minnesota. Guard Bull Brown was All-American. The 1930 team again defeated Minnesota; this time 33–7, and again lost twice; once to Tennessee again and once to Wade's final championship team at Alabama. In 1932, Vanderbilt—at the pinnacle of its athletics dominance in the South—joined the other SoCon schools south and west of the Appalachians in founding the Southeastern Conference. The other charter members were Alabama, Florida, Georgia, Kentucky, Ole Miss, Tennessee, Auburn, LSU, Mississippi State, Sewanee, Georgia Tech, and Tulane. Center Pete Gracey was a consensus All-American.

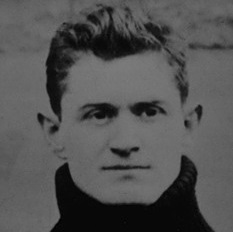
Ray Morrison

Coach McGugin retired after the 1934 season. He remains the most successful Vanderbilt head football coach in the history of the program. McGugin selected Bull Brown, Josh Cody, Lew Hardage, Ray Morrison, Bill Spears, and Hek Wakefield as the six best players he ever coached.

Coach Ray Morrison retook the reins of his alma mater following the retirement of his predecessor, Dan McGugin. Morrison posted a 29–22–2 overall record but his teams were inconsistent, with three winning seasons but two losing, failing to duplicate the success of his successful predecessor. He won SEC Coach of the Year honors in 1937 before being replaced after five seasons. The 1937 team defeated LSU with a hidden ball trick. Morrison also coach at SMU and is credited with bringing the forward pass to the southwest. He was inducted into the College Football Hall of Fame in 1954 Henry Russell Sanders had a successful stint as head coach at Vanderbilt, compiling a 36–22–2 (.617) record there from 1940 to 1942 and 1946 to 1948. His record is the best of any Vandy head football coach while the school has been a member of the SEC. Sanders' Commodores had a stunning upset of #7 ranked Alabama on November 22, 1941, in a driving rainstorm in Nashville; up to that time, only the second time in Commodore history where they defeated a ranked team.

Sanders left the Commodores after the 1942 season to serve in World War II. Ernest Alley led the Commodores for the 1943 season while Sanders was away at war. He posted a 5–0 record before departing to become an assistant at Auburn. Doby Bartling led the Commodores for two seasons (1944–1945) until Sanders returned. Bartling posted a 6–6–1 overall record in those two seasons. Sanders returned to lead the Commodores for three more seasons. He led Vanderbilt to its first top-20 ranking in the school history in 1947, where the team was ranked #10 after opening the season with two wins. The team defended its ranking with a defeat of #18 Mississippi, the first time Vanderbilt played a ranked school while ranked. An eight-game winning streak followed to end the 1948 season, including a #12 ranking in the final AP poll and a defeat of arch rival Tennessee. This still stands as the second longest single-season win streak in Vanderbilt football history. Sanders left to accept the head football coach position at UCLA. He was inducted into the College Football Hall of Fame as a coach in 1996. Bill Edwards was hired as Vanderbilt's head football coach and athletic director in 1949, replacing Henry Russell Sanders when Sanders left to become head coach at UCLA. Vanderbilt gave the 43-year-old coach a three-year contract paying a $12,500 salary ($169,143 in today's dollars). "I don't like to leave the Cleveland Browns and Paul Brown in particular," he said at the time. "I'll never forget my experiences with the Browns over the past two years." Edwards remained at Vanderbilt for four seasons, building up a 21–19–2 record. He instituted a modern T formation offense to replace Sanders's more traditional single-wing formation. He resigned in 1953 under pressure from Vanderbilt alumni following a 3–5–2 season.

Vanderbilt lured Arthur Guepe from Virginia in 1953 and he coached the Commodores for ten seasons (1953–1962). The 1954 team played the first night game at Dudley Field, against Baylor. Guepe's 1955 Vandy team, beat the 8th-ranked Auburn Tigers in the Gator Bowl and finished 8–3. Don Orr was Gator Bowl MVP. Guepe's Vandy teams won more Southeastern Conference games (19) than any Commodore coach before or since. After retiring from coaching after the 1962 season, Guepe said matter-of-factly and without bitterness: "There is no way you can be Harvard Monday through Friday and try to be Alabama on Saturday." His message to the Vanderbilt chancellor and trustees was unambiguous—to be competitive in the arena of big-time college football, Vanderbilt would have to ease some of its rigorous standards for admissions and academic eligibility. To their great credit, Vanderbilt officials refused to follow these suggestions, and Vanderbilt has maintained the integrity of its admissions and eligibility standards to this day.

John Green was hired away from his post as defensive coordinator at Florida as the new head football coach after Guepe's retirement. Green's Commodores struggled mightily under his watch, failing to win more than three games in a single season under his watch and posting a dismal 7–29–4 record in Green's four seasons. Green was fired after the 1966 season because of these miserable struggles and low attendance and fan support at home games.Bill Pace, previously an assistant at Arkansas, took over as the Commodores head coach after Green's firing. He too, would find winning difficult at Vanderbilt, posting only one winning record (a 5–4–1 1968 season) en route to a 22–38–3 overall record in his six seasons at the helm. Pace resigned after the 1972 season but remained the school's athletics director for another year before resigning that position as well.

In 1973, Steve Sloan took over as head coach. In his first season, Vanderbilt finished at 5–6, including a 1–6 record in conference play. During his second season, however, Vanderbilt finished at 7–3–1 and qualified for a post-season bowl game. The team was placed in the Peach Bowl against Texas Tech. The two teams played to a 6–6 tie in the game. It was Vanderbilt's first bowl game since 1955 and only the second in school history. Sloan left Vanderbilt after two seasons to accept the head football coach position at Texas Tech.

=== Fred Pancoast era (1975–1978) ===
Fred Pancoast arrived as head football coach at Vanderbilt from Memphis. In Pancoast's first season at the helm of the Commodores, the team posted a 7–4 record. That season, unfortunately, would be Pancoast's only winning season, as three consecutive 2–9 seasons followed. Amid dissatisfaction and frustration among the athletics department and fan base, like several of his predecessors, Pancoast resigned after the 1978 season. His final record in four years at VU is 13–31.

=== George MacIntyre era (1979–1985) ===
George MacIntyre, previously Ole Miss' offensive coordinator, became the Commodores' head coach in 1979. Following three losing seasons (1–10 in 1979, 2–9 in 1980, and 4–7 in 1981), Vanderbilt went 8–4 in 1982 and earned a berth in the Hall of Fame Classic Bowl, a game they lost. This would be Vanderbilt's only winning season with MacIntyre as coach, and MacIntyre would have an overall 25–52–1 record in seven seasons as head coach. After the 1985 season, MacIntyre resigned from Vanderbilt, and in doing so echoed the reasoning of his predecessors, blaming the "continuing rise in academic standards, both in admissions and in the retaining of student athletes" for Vanderbilt's losing seasons.

=== Watson Brown era (1986–1990) ===
Watson Brown, older brother of former Texas head coach Mack Brown, came to Vanderbilt from Rice. Brown could never get the Commodores pointed in the right direction or find success, failing to post a winning record or win more than four games in a single season in his five-year tenure as head coach. After posting 1–10 records in 1989 and 1990, Brown was fired.

=== Gerry DiNardo era (1991–1994) ===
In December 1990, Gerry DiNardo took the head coach job at Vandy, starting in the 1991 season. DiNardo went 5–6, 4–7, 5–6, and 5–6 in his four seasons at the helm. DiNardo's two biggest wins were the Commodores' victories over #17 Georgia on October 19, 1991 and #25 Ole Miss on September 19, 1992. These were the first times Vanderbilt defeated a ranked team in years, and there was hope that DiNardo would restore the glories of the past and recruit well despite high academic requirements for acceptance and enrollment.

Despite pleas from the fan base and administration to stay, DiNardo left the Commodores after the 1994 season to accept the head football coach position at LSU.

=== Rod Dowhower era (1995–1996) ===
Rod Dowhower was brought to Vanderbilt from his position as an assistant coach for the NFL's Cleveland Browns amid high hopes that he would build on the momentum of his predecessor DiNardo's tenure. However, this never came to pass, as things went downhill very quickly and steadily, as Dowhower's teams was only able to salvage two 2–9 seasons (that included only one conference victory), after which Dowhower resigned under pressure.

=== Woody Widenhofer era (1997–2001) ===
Long-time NFL assistant coach Woody Widenhofer was brought to Vanderbilt amid hopes that he was the right hire and that he would resurrect the seemingly dead Commodores football program. He, like his predecessors, struggled to find success on the football field, and the high academic standards of the university limited his recruiting possibilities. Widenhofer's best season was a 5–6 1999 season. Other than that, the Commodores were unable to win more than three games in a single season, leading to Widenhofer's resignation after five seasons. While his on-the-field results weren't very successful, the NCAA announced that Widenhofer graduated a perfect 100% of his players in 2001, the best in the entire country.

=== Bobby Johnson era (2002–2009) ===
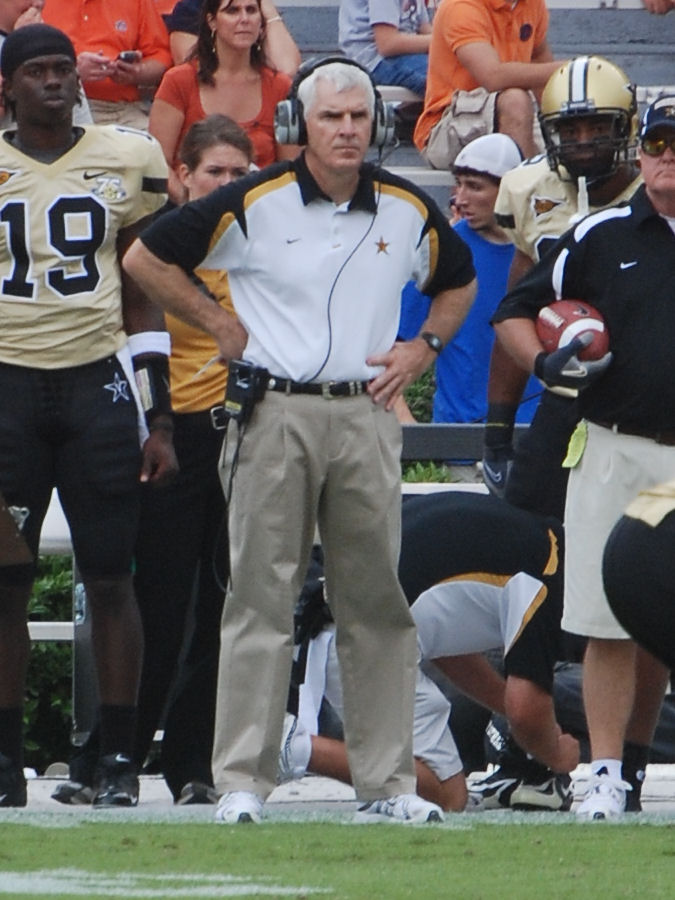
Coach Bobby Johnson

Bobby Johnson was hired in 2002 as the head football coach. Johnson had previously coached at NCAA Division I-AA power Furman, leading the Paladins to the Division I-AA title game in 2001, his final year. However, at the time, some questioned the wisdom of hiring a I-AA coach to lead a program in what has widely been reckoned as the strongest football conference in the nation.

Vanderbilt officials had pursued and offered the position initially to Gary Barnett and Tyrone Willingham, both of whom had steered small, private universities (Northwestern and Stanford, respectively) to football success. Both turned down the job for different reasons.

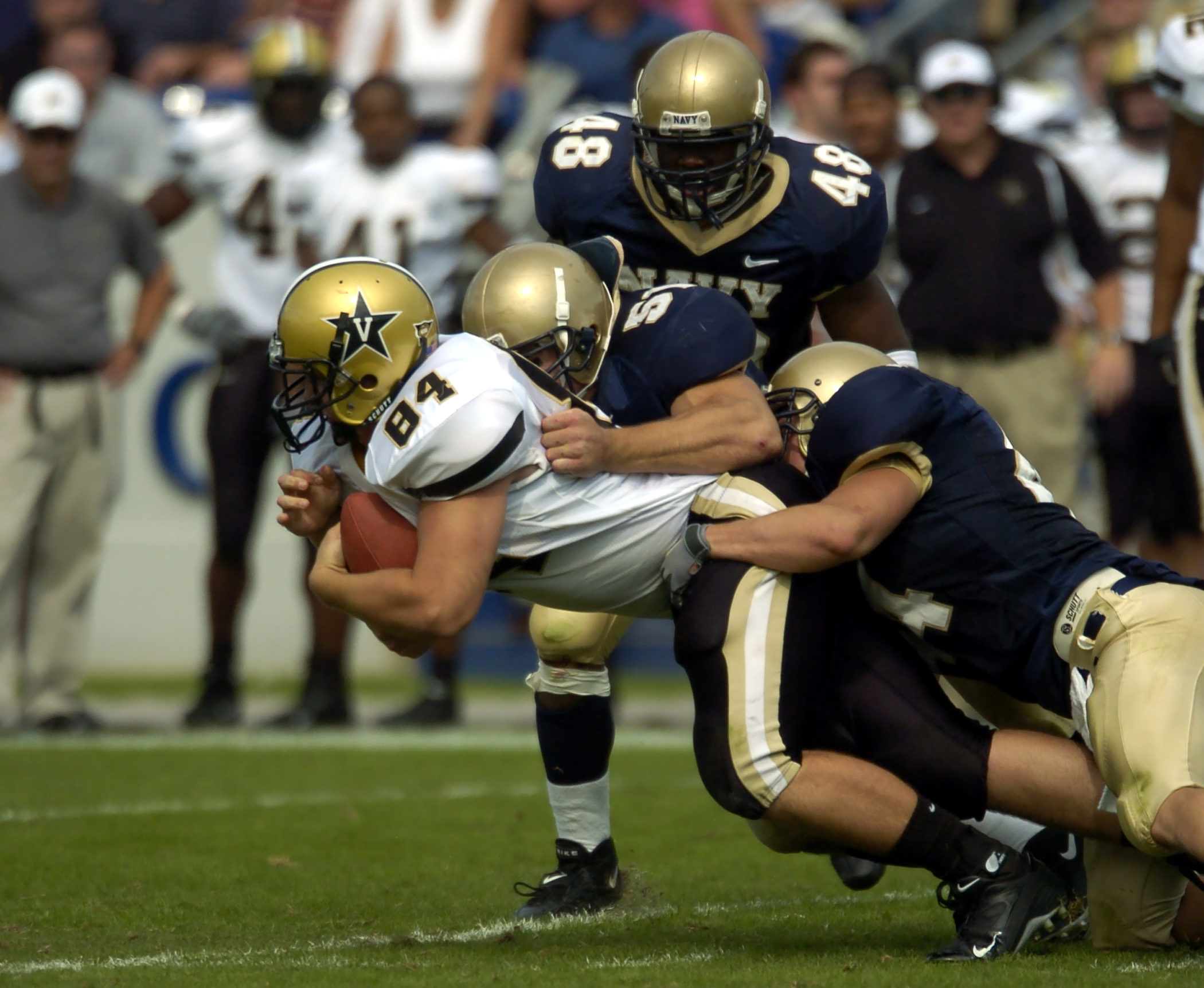
2004 Vanderbilt-Navy Game

The same critics that questioned Johnson's initial hiring also derided the loyalty given to Coach Johnson by the Vanderbilt administration after his first three seasons at the school led to three consecutive 2–9 records. During this time, however, Johnson was continuing to recruit players that had been passed over by major-power schools, but whom Johnson and his staff believed could be molded into SEC-caliber players. In 2005, Vanderbilt finished with a 5–6 record, the program's best finish since 1999. This included a win in Knoxville against cross-state rival Tennessee. All-SEC Quarterback Jay Cutler, the team's offensive captain that season and the offensive player of the year in the SEC, was selected 11th overall in the 2006 NFL draft by the Denver Broncos and named starting quarterback for the last five games of his rookie season. After three seasons with Denver, Cutler was traded to the Chicago Bears, serving as their starter from 2009 to 2016 before wrapping up his career with the Miami Dolphins. In the 2006 season, Vanderbilt finished with a 4–8 record with sophomore Chris Nickson at quarterback. The 2006 team's peak performance came with a 24–22 defeat of conference rival #16 ranked Georgia at Sanford Stadium, the first time Vanderbilt had ever defeated a ranked opponent on the road. The team came within seconds of defeating Arkansas and Alabama in consecutive weeks.

Vanderbilt fans approached the 2007 season with considerable optimism, given the return of many experienced starters, including WR Earl Bennett and the closeness of the Arkansas and Alabama losses. Vanderbilt started the year strong with a decisive victory over Richmond, but hopes for a win against Nick Saban's Alabama squad fizzled in a 24–10 loss marked by several controversial penalties. Vanderbilt rebounded with strong wins against Ole Miss and Eastern Michigan, but the Ole Miss victory came at a cost, as quarterback Chris Nickson suffered an injury that negatively impacted his future performance and led to his mid-season replacement by Mackenzi Adams. While Vanderbilt appeared to be en route to a convincing homecoming win against #21 Georgia, a late-game Bulldog rally coupled with a costly Vanderbilt fumble in the final minutes of the fourth quarter led to a disappointing 20–17 loss. Vanderbilt rebounded with a stunning upset of #6 ranked South Carolina 17–6 at Williams-Brice Stadium in Columbia, beating a top 10 team for the first time in 33 years and a Steve Spurrier-coached team for the first time ever. It was the highest ranked team Vanderbilt had beaten since defeating #6 LSU in 1937. In the following home game against Miami (Ohio), junior wide receiver Earl Bennett made history by breaking the SEC record for most career receptions. Vanderbilt would go on to win the game 24–13. With a 5–3 record entering the last four games of the season, the Commodores seemed primed for bowl eligibility. After a lopsided defeat against Florida and a close loss to Kentucky, the Commodores went to Knoxville to play Tennessee at Neyland Stadium for the first time since their 2005 win. Despite entering as heavy underdogs, Vanderbilt jumped out to a 24–9 lead at the end of the third quarter, but the Volunteers scored 16 unanswered points in the fourth quarter to win the game by one point. Vanderbilt went on to lose its final game of the season against Wake Forest 31–17.

In 2008, Vanderbilt began the season winning their first five games, beating Miami (OH), South Carolina, Rice, Ole Miss, and Auburn. Vanderbilt lost its next four games, however on November 15, 2008, Vanderbilt defeated Kentucky to become bowl eligible for the first time since 1982. The Commodores finished the 2008 regular season with losses to Tennessee and Wake Forest, completing the regular season with a 6–6 record (4–4 in the SEC). Their 2008 finish was good enough for the Commodores to earn an invitation to play Boston College in the Music City Bowl on December 31, 2008. In a come-from-behind win, Vanderbilt narrowly beat Boston College by a score of 16–14, to win its first bowl game in 53 years. The 2008 Vanderbilt Commodore football team is also noteworthy because it won the 2008 Academic Achievement Award from the American Football Coaches Association (AFCA). This award recognizes graduate rate successes on the NCAA Football Bowl Subdivision level. Vanderbilt was recognized for graduating 95 percent of its 2001 freshman class, the highest graduation rate among all 119 FBS teams. Junior cornerback D.J. Moore received All-SEC first team honors for the second straight season and second team All-American honors following the 2008 season. He was later drafted by the Chicago Bears in the fourth round of the 2009 NFL Draft.

The upward trajectory of Vanderbilt football took a step back in 2009. Despite returning 18 starters from the 2008 bowl-championship season, the Commodores finished a disappointing 2–10. Numerous injuries contributed to the team's troubles, as several starters were lost with season-ending injuries, including Ryan Hamilton (Safety), Jared Hawkins (RB), James Williams (OL), and Larry Smith (QB). In addition, transfer WR and projected starter Terrence Jeffers was not academically eligible to play the entire season.

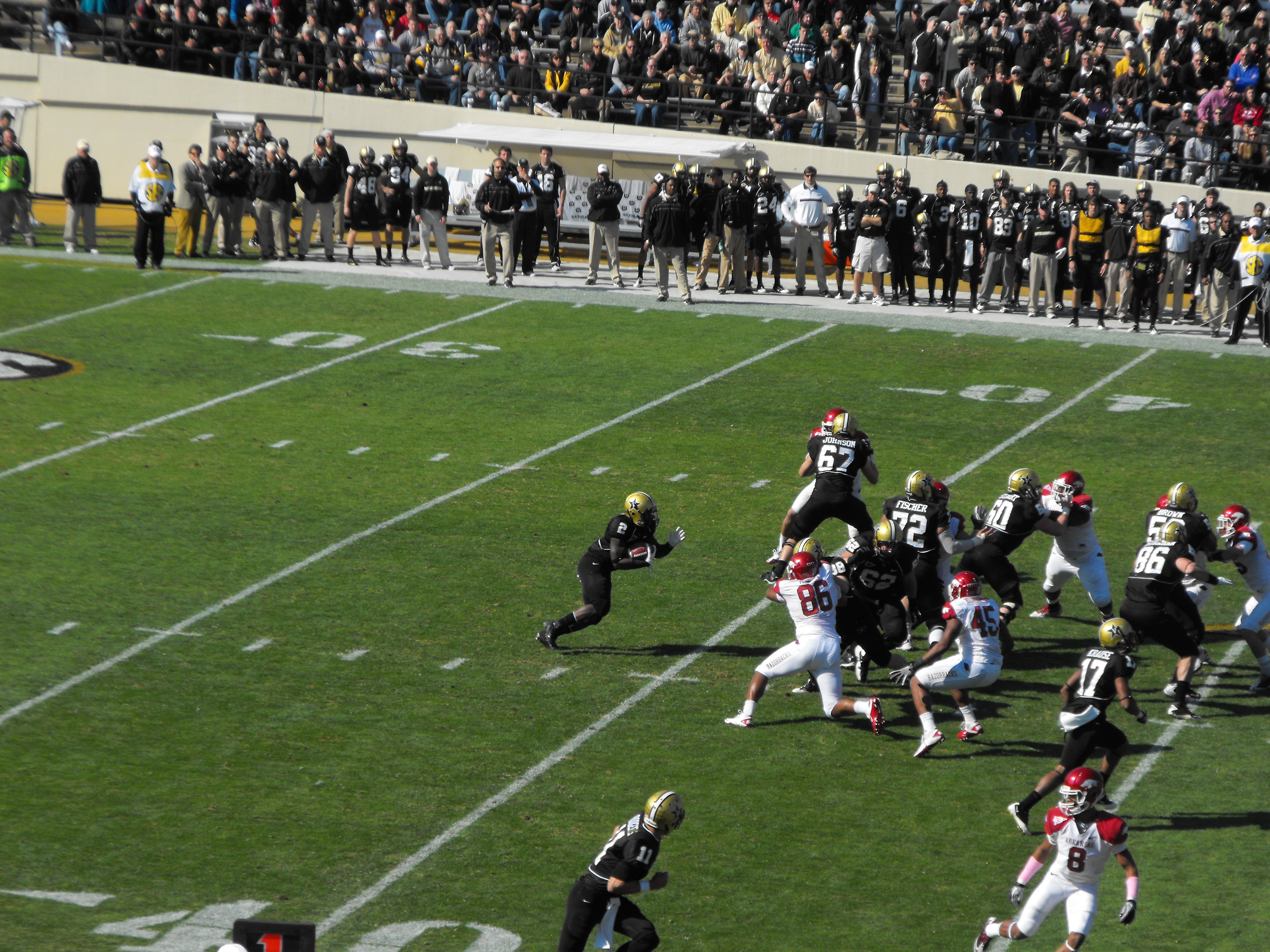
2011 vs. Arkansas Razorbacks

On July 14, 2010, Bobby Johnson announced his retirement. With less than two months until the season opener, the move was a shock to many players and fans. Said Johnson, "I’ve decided to retire, not resign".

=== Robbie Caldwell era (2010) ===
On August 2, 2010, Vanderbilt Vice-Chancellor of Student Life David Williams, who has overseen intercollegiate athletics since Vanderbilt dissolved its athletic department in 2003, announced that the "interim" tag would be dropped from Robbie Caldwell's title, and that they had agreed to a new contract to be the full-time head coach. Vanderbilt did not release the terms of the contract, but it is known to have been a multiyear contract. Caldwell was popular in his first public appearance at SEC Media Days, and has been a sought-after guest among sports talk shows. His first major coaching decision came on August 6, 2010, when he hired Herb Hand, former offensive co-coordinator at the Tulsa to be the offensive line coach at Vanderbilt.

On September 18, 2010, after close home losses to Northwestern and LSU, Caldwell picked up his first win as a head coach, as Vandy defeated the Ole Miss Rebels 28–14 in Oxford, MS. He became the first Vanderbilt coach since 1975 to win his road debut. Caldwell won his second game 52–6 against Eastern Michigan. However, starting with a 43–0 loss to Georgia, the Commodores began a six-game losing streak going into the season ending game against Wake Forest. On November 27, hours before kickoff against Wake Forest, Robbie Caldwell announced that he would resign as head coach effective that evening saying, “Having the opportunity to be Vanderbilt’s head football coach has been a dream come true and I greatly appreciated the chance to serve, and I gave it my best. However, after a lot of reflection, I’ve realized it is time for me to step aside and let someone else pick up the hard work and efforts of our staff.”

=== James Franklin era (2011–2013) ===
James Franklin, formerly offensive coordinator at Maryland, took over the Vanderbilt football program as head coach. Franklin started out the 2011 season bringing the Commodores to a 3–0 start with wins against Elon, Connecticut, and SEC rival Ole Miss. This was the best start for a new Vanderbilt coach in 68 years. After losing three games including a close loss to Georgia, Vanderbilt improved to four wins with a homecoming victory against Army. After losing a 31–28 game against SEC opponent Arkansas and to Florida, 26–21, the Commodores defeated conference opponent Kentucky at home in Nashville by an impressive 38–8, improving to five wins on the season. After a close loss to in-state and SEC rival Tennessee, Vanderbilt capped the season with a 41–7 road win against Wake Forest, finishing the season 6–6, with a 2–6 record in the SEC, and earning a trip to the Liberty Bowl in Memphis against the Cincinnati Bearcats; with a loss of 31–24, Vandy finished 6–7.

Franklin became the first Vanderbilt head coach to lead a Commodore team to a bowl game as a first-year head coach. As Franklin is the first coach to bring a Vanderbilt team to a bowl game two years in a row, he also has the most bowl appearances as a Vanderbilt head coach. He has the most wins for consecutive years (15) since 1926–1927. Vanderbilt went to a bowl in back-to-back years for the first time in its history in 2012 and had its first regular season winning record since 1981. It also included the first 9 win season since 1915, and first 8 win season since 1982, including the longest winning streak (7) since 1948 and longest road win streak (4) since 1950. Vanderbilt scored 40 points or more the most times (5) since 1915. The Commodores defeated rival Tennessee at home for the first time in 30 years; the 41–18 margin was the largest since 1954. They also defeated rival Ole Miss in consecutive years for the first time since 1951, and beat rival Kentucky by the largest margin since 1916. Kicker Carey Spear set a school of 81 points. Running back Zac Stacy was the first Vanderbilt football player to rush for over 3,000 yards in a career or 1,000 yards in back to back years. Receiver Jordan Matthews set a single-season record with 1,262 yards receiving. "Anchor Down" was established as the team's motto during the 2012 season and carried over into the 2013 season.

After the 2013 season Vanderbilt claimed the first back-to-back 9-win seasons in school history, again going to a bowl game, posting records of 10–2 in November under Franklin. Vanderbilt beat Georgia, Florida, Kentucky, and Tennessee in the same season for the first time in school history, including defeating Florida at "the Swamp" for the first time since 1945. Spear broke his previous season's record, making 99 points, and Jordan Matthews set SEC records of 263 career receptions and 3759 career yards, as well as 112 receptions in a season. Jerron Seymour set the single-season Vanderbilt record for touchdowns at 14. Coach Franklin was on the radar for a number of teams looking for a new head coach. On January 9, 2014 coach Franklin was rumored to have accepted a job as head coach of Penn State Nittany Lions, though neither university had confirmed the report. Finally, on January 11, 2014, Penn State officially announced that James Franklin had become the 16th head coach of the Nittany Lions, effectively ending his tenure as the Vanderbilt Commodores head coach.

On August 9, 2013, four Vanderbilt football players were arrested and indicted for rape. Brandon Vandenburg, Cory Lamont Batey, Brandon E. Banks, and Jaborian "Tip" McKenzie were taken into custody in connection with the Vanderbilt rape case. All four men were charged with five counts of aggravated rape and two counts of aggravated sexual battery. They carried an unconscious 21-year-old female student into a dorm room in the school's Gilette House, and gang-raped and sodomized her on the floor in a 32-minute attack on June 23, 2013. They took graphic photos and videos of the rape. The victim (who is White) told the court that after Batey (who is Black) raped her, he urinated on her face while saying she deserved what he was doing to her because of the color of her skin, which sources reported was "That’s for 400 years of slavery you b----." The defendants were dismissed from the football team on June 29, 2013 and banned from campus during the six-week investigation that followed. A fifth player, Chris Boyd, pleaded guilty to criminal attempt to commit accessory after the fact and was dismissed from the team but not the university for his role in helping to cover up the rape. Three of the players were convicted, and received prison sentences ranging from 15 years, the minimum allowed by Tennessee law for their crimes, to 17 years. The fourth player accepted a plea deal which included 10 years' probation, and did not receive any jail time.

=== Derek Mason era (2014–2020) ===
On January 17, 2014, Derek Mason, formerly Stanford associate head coach and defensive coordinator, was announced as the new Vanderbilt head coach.

The Derek Mason era got off to a bad start when his mistake-prone Commodores were outscored in a 37–7 loss to visiting Temple at home. It was Vanderbilt's worst opening-season home loss in the school's history of football and the worst opening game loss since 1998 a 42–0 loss to Ole Miss. The Commodores had seven turnovers, leading to 27 points for Temple. After back to back home losses Coach Mason won his first game against the #120 ranked UMass in a hard-fought game 34–31. Vanderbilt did not score an offensive touchdown for nine quarters. Vanderbilt was also the last team in the Division I FBS to score an offensive TD. Vanderbilt had been outscored 10–78 in the two prior games before the win. Vanderbilt would lose its next three games to South Carolina, Kentucky and Georgia, falling to 0–4 in conference play. On October 11, the Commodores would beat Charleston Southern by one point, an FCS school. The next week would see a ten-point loss to Missouri, dropping them to 0–5 in conference play. Following a 42–28 victory over Old Dominion, a school that is new to the FBS, Vanderbilt would lose to Florida, Mississippi State, and archrival Tennessee, by a combined score of 109–27. Over the course of the season, Vanderbilt would start four different players at quarterback, including true freshman Wade Freebeck. Vanderbilt ended the season 3–9 overall and 0–8 in the SEC.

Coach Mason had greater success at the helm in 2016. Vanderbilt finished the season 6-6, including wins over SEC rivals Georgia, Ole Miss, and Tennessee. They played in the Independence Bowl, losing to North Carolina State 41–17. Although the Commodores once again defeated in-state rival Tennessee in 2017, it was their only SEC victory. Vanderbilt ended the season with a record of 5–7.

On November 28, 2020, the Commodores made history when Sarah Fuller, the starting goalkeeper for the school's women's soccer program, made an appearance in the second half of a 41–0 loss to Missouri. Fuller thus became the first woman to play in a Power Five football game when she took the opening kickoff of the second half of the game with a 30 yard squib kick. (The term “Power Five” was not in use when Katie Hnida became the first woman to score in an NCAA Division I-A game, college football's highest level, on August 30, 2003.) On December 12, 2020, Fuller kicked an extra point following a first-quarter touchdown in a game against Tennessee, making her the first woman to score a point in a Power Five football game. Fuller’s playing in these games rather than the usual player occurred due to the ongoing roster attrition arising from the COVID-19 pandemic and quarantine protocols.

=== Clark Lea era (2021–present) ===
On December 14, 2020, former Vanderbilt player, and Notre Dame defensive coordinator, Clark Lea was named the Vanderbilt head football coach.

On October 5, 2024, Vanderbilt defeated AP No. 1 Alabama, 40–35, in arguably one of the biggest wins in the history of the Vanderbilt program, along with one of the biggest upsets of the season. Overall, it was Vanderbilt's first win against Alabama since 1984, and specifically in Nashville since 1969. Also, with the win, Vanderbilt earned its first victory over an AP top-5 opponent, having previously been 0–60 against such teams.

Vanderbilt would go on to finish 7-6 (3-5 SEC), defeating Georgia Tech in the Birmingham Bowl for its first winning season (and Bowl victory) since 2013.

On October 20, 2025, after defeating No. 10 LSU, Vanderbilt was ranked No. 10, making it the first time they have been ranked in the top ten on an AP poll since their No. 10 ranking during the 1947 season. The team also made multiple College GameDay appearances in the same season for the first time in their entire history, first with No. 10 Alabama on October 4, 2025, and then with No. 15 Missouri on October 25, 2025. On November 29, following a 45–24 victory over in-state rivals No. 19 Tennessee at Neyland Stadium, the Commodores achieved their first regular season of 10 wins, ending the year 10–2.
