= Elliot Jones (disambiguation) =

Elliot Jones may refer to:

- Elliott Jones (1870–1951), Vanderbilt University football coach
- Elliott Jones (sport shooter) (1908–1994), American sports shooter
- Elliot Jones, American baseball player and coach
- Elliot Jones (sprinter) (born 2001), British international sprinter

== See also ==
- E. H. Jones (disambiguation)
