= NFL 100 Greatest Plays =

Selection of American football plays

The National Football League 100 Greatest Plays was voted on by a panel consisting of media members, former players and league personnel in 2019 to honor the greatest plays of the first 100 years of the National Football League (NFL).

== Selection process ==
The plays were chosen by a panel of 26 voters—coaches, team and front office executives, former players and members of the media—between April and June 2018. New England Patriots head coach Bill Belichick and Pro Football Hall of Fame head coach and former color commentator John Madden, both voters, were in charge of looking over film and issuing a report to the committee on players in the early years of the league.

The teams were unveiled over six weeks on NFL Network by host Rich Eisen alongside Cris Collinsworth from NBC Sports and Belichick.

== NFL 100 Greatest Plays ==
Rank	Play	Date	Event
1	"Immaculate Reception"	Dec. 23, 1972	AFC Divisional Playoff
2	"The Catch" Joe Montana TD Pass to Dwight Clark	Jan. 10, 1982	NFC Championship
3	David Tyree Helmet Catch in Super Bowl XLII	Feb. 3, 2008	Super Bowl XLII
4	"Music City Miracle"	Jan. 8, 2000	AFC Wild Card
5	Malcolm Butler Interception in Super Bowl XLIX	Feb. 1, 2015	Super Bowl XLIX
6	Santonio Holmes Catch in Super Bowl XLIII	Feb. 1, 2009	Super Bowl XLIII
7	"Immaculate Interception" in Super Bowl XLIII	Feb. 1, 2009	Super Bowl XLIII
8	Bart Starr's QB Sneak in the Ice Bowl	Dec. 31, 1967	NFL Championship
9	"Minneapolis Miracle"	Jan. 14, 2018	NFC Divisional Playoff
10	"Philly Special"	Feb. 4, 2018	Super Bowl LII
11	“One Yard Short” Game Saving Tackle In Super Bowl XXXIV	Jan. 30, 2000	Super Bowl XXXIV
12	Lynn Swann 53 Yard Circus Catch in Super Bowl X	Jan. 18, 1976	Super Bowl X
13	Marshawn Lynch "Beast Quake" Run Through Saints	Jan. 8, 2011	NFC Wild Card
14	Marcus Allen 74 Yard TD Run in Super Bowl XVIII	Jan. 22, 1984	Super Bowl XVIII
15	Staubach's Hail Mary TD Pass to Pearson	Dec. 28, 1975	NFC Divisional Playoff
16	Odell Beckham Jr. One-Handed Catch	Nov. 23, 2014	Week 12
17	"The Sea of Hands" Catch	Dec. 21, 1974	AFC Divisional Playoff
18	Vinatieri Kick Ties the "Tuck Rule Game"	Jan. 19, 2002	AFC Divisional Playoff
19	Game-Winning TD in Greatest Game Ever Played	Dec. 28, 1958	NFL Championship
20	Riggins' 43 Yard TD Run on 4th Down in Super Bowl XVII	Jan. 30, 1983	Super Bowl XVII
21	Montana TD Pass to Taylor in Super Bowl XXIII	Jan. 22, 1989	Super Bowl XXIII
22	Julian Edelman Keeps it off the turf in Super Bowl LI	Feb. 5, 2017	Super Bowl LI
23	"Miracle at the Meadowlands"	Nov. 19, 1978	Week 12
24	"The Catch II" Steve Young to Terrell Owens	Jan. 3, 1999	NFC Wild Card
25	Bo Jackson 91 Yard TD Run Into Stadium Tunnel	Nov. 30, 1987	Week 12
26	"The Holy Roller"	Sep. 10, 1978	Week 2
27	Steve Young's Game-Winning 49 Yard TD Run	Oct. 30, 1988	Week 9
28	Steve Gleason Blocks Punt	Sep. 25, 2006	Week 3
29	"Ghost to the Post" Stabler 42 Yard Pass to Casper	Dec. 24, 1977	AFC Divisional Playoff
30	Elway Completes "The Drive" on TD Pass to Jackson	Jan. 11, 1987	AFC Championship
31	Manningham Catch in Super Bowl XLVI	Feb. 5, 2012	Super Bowl XLVI
32	Tracy Porter INT Seals Super Bowl XLIV	Feb. 7, 2010	Super Bowl XLIV
33	John Elway's Helicopter Spin	Jan. 25, 1998	Super Bowl XXXII
34	Gale Sayers' 85 Yard Punt Return for TD	Dec. 12, 1965	Week 13
35	Tony Dorsett 99 Yard TD Run on MNF	Jan. 3, 1983	Week 17
36	DeSean Jackson's "Miracle at the Meadowlands II"	Dec. 19, 2010	Week 15
37	Walter Payton Runs Through the Chiefs	Nov. 13, 1977	Week 9
38	Dan Marino's Fake Spike Play	Nov. 27, 1994	Week 13
39	Campbell Puts Head Into Defender's Chest	Nov. 20, 1978	Week 12
40	John Mackey Runs Over Lions D for 64 Yard TD	Nov. 20, 1966	Week 11
41	"He Did What?!"	Nov. 6, 2000	Week 10
42	"Miami Miracle" 2018	Dec. 9, 2018	Week 14
43	Tony Nathan "Hook and Lateral"	Jan. 2, 1982	AFC Divisional Playoff
44	Chuck Bednarik Hit on Frank Gifford	Nov. 20, 1960	Week 9
45	Bradshaw's TD Pass to Stallworth in Super Bowl XIV	Jan. 20, 1980	Super Bowl XIV
46	Don Beebe Chases Down Leon Lett in Super Bowl XXVII	Jan. 31, 1993	Super Bowl XXVII
47	Jim Brown Breaks Off A 77 Yard TD Catch	Nov. 24, 1963	Week 11
48	Rodgers' Game Tying Hail Mary vs. Cardinals	Jan. 16, 2016	NFC Divisional Playoff
49	Castille Strips Byner to Cause "The Fumble"	Jan. 17, 1988	AFC Championship
50	Max McGee's One-Handed TD Catch in Super Bowl I	Jan. 15, 1967	Super Bowl I
51	Barry Sanders' 47 Yard TD Run	Nov. 27, 1997	Week 14
52	"Motown Miracle"	Dec. 3, 2015	Week 13
53	Tarkenton Eludes Defenders Before Long TD Pass	Nov. 13, 1977	Week 9
54	Jim Marshall's "Wrong Way Run"	Oct. 25, 1964	Week 7
55	"River City Relay"	Dec. 21, 2003	Week 16
56	Ed Brown Passes to Harlon Hill for TD	Dec. 30, 1956	NFL Championship
57	Roethlisberger's Game Saving Tackle	Jan. 15, 2006	AFC Divisional Playoff
58	Richard Sherman Tips Pass For INT	Jan. 19, 2014	NFC Championship
59	B. Sanders Spins Defenders on 39 Yard TD Run	Nov. 28, 1991	Week 13
60	Deion Sanders Punt Return TD In First NFL Game	Sep. 10, 1989	Week 1
61	"Old Man Willie" Intercepts Tarkenton for TD	Jan. 9, 1977	Super Bowl XI
62	Dante Hall Amazing Punt Return	Oct. 5, 2003	Week 5
63	Ed Reed's Record 107 Yd Interception	Nov. 23, 2008	Week 12
64	Favre 40 Yard TD Pass to Sharpe in Playoffs	Jan. 8, 1994	NFC Wild Card
65	A. Peterson Stiff Arms Browns for 64 Yard TD	Sep. 13, 2009	Week 1
66	Garrison Hearst's 96 Yard TD Run in Overtime	Sep. 6, 1998	Week 1
67	Favre Deep Pass to Greg Lewis Wins Game	Sep. 27, 2009	Week 3
68	Randy Moss Lateral Behind the Back for TD	Oct. 19, 2003	Week 7
69	MIke Ditka's Amazing Catch and Run	1963	1963 Season
70	Michael Vick 46 Yard Game-Winning TD Run	Dec. 1, 2002	Week 13
71	"Alley-Oop" to R.C. Owens for Long TD Pass	Nov. 3, 1957	Week 6
72	Cunningham's 95 Yard TD Pass to Barnett	Dec. 2, 1990	Week 13
73	Mark Ingram catch in Super Bowl XXV on 3rd and 13	Jan. 27, 1991	Super Bowl XXV
74	"65 Toss Power Trap" in Super Bowl IV	Jan. 11, 1970	Super Bowl IV
75	Garo's Gaffe in Super Bowl VII	Jan. 14, 1973	Super Bowl VII
76	Tebow to Thomas for Game-Winning TD	Jan. 8, 2012	AFC Wild Card
77	Von Miller Strip Sack in Super Bowl 50	Feb. 7, 2016	Super Bowl 50
78	"Miracle at the Met"	Dec. 14, 1980	Week 15
79	"Refrigerator" Perry's Rushing TD in Super Bowl XX	Jan. 26, 1986	Super Bowl XX
80	Randel El to Hines Ward in Super Bowl XL	Feb. 5, 2006	Super Bowl XL
81	No Stopping Bavaro vs. the 49ers on MNF	Dec. 1, 1986	Week 14
82	R. Cunningham Absorbs Hit, Throws TD	Oct. 10, 1988	Week 6
83	Steve Atwater Stops Christian Okoye	Sep. 17, 1990	Week 2
84	Randy Moss One-Handed TD Over Revis	Sep. 19, 2010	Week 2
85	Ben Watson Stops A Defensive Touchdown	Jan. 14, 2006	AFC Divisional Playoff
86	Al Harris Overtime INT to Win Playoff Game	Jan. 4, 2004	NFC Wild Card
87	Steve Bartkowski Hail Mary	Nov. 20, 1983	Week 12
88	Cromartie Returns Missed FG 109 Yards	Nov. 4, 2007	Week 9
89	Derrick Henry 99 Yard Touchdown Run	Dec. 6, 2018	Week 14
90	Emmitt Smith 29 Yard TD Run	Jan. 2, 1994	Week 18
91	Steve Van Buren's Championship-Winning TD	Dec. 19, 1948	NFL Championship
92	Vinny Testaverde TD Throw to Jumbo Elliott	Oct. 23, 2000	Week 8
93	Hugh McElhenny No Helmet Catch and Run	Oct. 19, 1952	Week 4
94	L. Fitzgerald's Overtime Catch and Run	Jan. 16, 2016	NFC Divisional Playoff
95	Larry Wilson One-Handed INT Returned for TD	Dec. 19, 1965	Week 14
96	Wilber Marshall Returns a Fumble for TD	Jan. 12, 1986	NFC Championship
97	Jim Brown Powers Through Cowboys	Oct. 18, 1964	Week 6
98	Billy Sims Karate Kicks Steve Brown	Sep. 11, 1983	Week 2
99	"Butt Fumble" Returned for TD	Nov. 22, 2012	Week 12
100	Roger Craig's High Knees TD Through Rams	Oct. 16, 1988	Week 7
