= List of the first college football games in each U.S. state =

The following is a list of the first college football game in each U.S. state and the District of Columbia. Games included on this list are the earliest recorded single intercollegiate football games in each member state of the United States.

State	Date	Home	Visitor	Location	Final score	Notes
NJ	November 6, 1869	Rutgers	Princeton	College Avenue Field, New Brunswick, New Jersey	6–4	First organized intercollegiate football game in New Jersey. The game was essentially soccer, but is considered the first college football game ever played.
NY	November 2, 1872	Columbia	Rutgers	Union Base Ball Club Grounds, Tremont, New York	0–0	First organized intercollegiate football game in New York. The game was essentially soccer, as a kick over the crossbar was not counted as a goal. Tremont became a part of New York City in 1874, and Walter Gladwin Park in The Bronx is the approximate location where the game was played.
CT	November 16, 1872	Yale	Columbia	Hamilton Park, New Haven, Connecticut	3–0	First organized intercollegiate football game in Connecticut. First game in New England. The game was essentially soccer with 20-man sides, played on a field 400 by 250 feet. Yale won 3–0, Tommy Sherman scoring the first goal and Lew Irwin the other two.
VA	November 2, 1873	Washington and Lee	VMI	Lexington, Virginia	4–2	First organized intercollegiate football game in Virginia. The game was essentially soccer and is considered by some to be the first intercollegiate game in the south. Some industrious students of the two schools organized a game for October 23, 1869 – but it was rained out. Students of the University of Virginia were playing pickup games of the kicking-style of football as early as 1870, and some accounts even claim it organized a game against Washington and Lee College in 1871. But no record has been found of the score of this contest. Due to scantness of records of the prior matches some will claim either Richmond v. Randolph-Macon on December 3, 1881 (essentially soccer) or Virginia v. Pantops Academy on November 13, 1887 as the first game in Virginia.
MA	May 14, 1874	Harvard	McGill	Jarvis Field, Cambridge, Massachusetts	3–0	First organized intercollegiate football game in Massachusetts. The game was played under the "Boston Rules", which were essentially modified soccer rules that allowed the ball to be carried in some limited circumstances. The next day, May 15, 1874, Harvard and McGill played to a scoreless tie in the first organized intercollegiate football game under rugby rules.
ME	November 6, 1875	Bates	Tufts	Rand Field, Lewiston, Maine	1–0	First organized intercollegiate football game in Maine. After playing Harvard in a rugby football game in June 1875, Tufts took its squad to Bates College for the first organized intercollegiate football game played in Maine.
PA	November 11, 1876	Penn	Princeton	Young America Cricket Club Grounds (Turnpike Bridge), Philadelphia, Pennsylvania	6–0	First organized intercollegiate football game in Pennsylvania. The game was essentially soccer, though some "batting with the wrist" was apparently allowed.
IL	May 30, 1879	Michigan	Racine College	White-Stocking Park, Chicago, Illinois	1–0	First organized intercollegiate football game in Illinois. The Chicago Daily Tribune called it "the first rugby-football game to be played west of the Alleghenies" and it was advertised as the "championship of the Western Colleges." The first organized intercollegiate football game in Illinois played by teams from the state occurred November 11, 1882, when Lake Forest defeated Northwestern 1–0 on the Campus Meadow in Evanston.
MI	November 1, 1879	Michigan	Toronto	Recreation Park, Detroit, Michigan	0–0	First organized intercollegiate football game in Michigan.
KY	April 9, 1880	Transylvania	Centre	Stoll Field, Lexington, Kentucky	13¾–0	First organized intercollegiate football game in Kentucky. Due to being the first rugby-style intercollegiate game in the south, the game is considered by some to be the first intercollegiate game in the south.
NH	November 17, 1881	Dartmouth	Amherst	Hanover, New Hampshire	1–0	First organized intercollegiate football game in New Hampshire. The first organized football game in New Hampshire involving a college occurred October 29, 1881 when MIT defeated Exeter Academy 2-0 in Exeter.
MN	September 30, 1882	Minnesota	Hamline	King's Fair Ground, Minneapolis, Minnesota	4–0	First organized intercollegiate football game in Minnesota. Some secondary sources may incorrectly report September 29 as the date and the State Fairgrounds in St. Paul as the location. The correct date and location are September 30 at King's Fair Ground in Minneapolis.
MD	November 30, 1882	Navy	Johns Hopkins	Annapolis, Maryland	8–0	First organized intercollegiate football in Maryland. It snowed heavily before the game, to the point where players for both teams had to clear layers of snow off of the field, making large piles of snow along the sides of the playing ground. The field was 110 yards by 53 yards, with goalposts 25 feet (7.6 m) apart and 20 feet (6.1 m) high. The first half of the game went scoreless; the Baltimore American reported that "the visitors pushed Navy every place but over the goal line in the first half". During play, the ball was kicked over the seawall a number of times, once going so far out it had to be retrieved by boat before play could continue. The first organized football game in Maryland involving a college occurred December 11, 1879 when Navy and the Baltimore Athletic Club played to a scoreless tie on the "superintendent's cow pasture" in Annapolis.
DC	November 20, 1883	Gallaudet	Georgetown	Kendall Green, Washington, D.C.	13–0	First organized intercollegiate football game in Washington, D.C.
IN	May 31, 1884	Butler	DePauw	7th Street Base Ball Park, Indianapolis, Indiana	16–0	First organized intercollegiate football game in Indiana.
CO	April 11, 1885	Colorado College	Denver	Athletic Park, Colorado Springs, Colorado	12–0	First organized intercollegiate football game in Colorado. The CC Athletic Association responded to a challenge from the University of Denver by scheduling a game early on April 11. A severe windstorm that morning forced postponement of the game until the afternoon. The first organized football game in Colorado involving a college occurred December 25, 1882 when Colorado College defeated Sigafus Hose Company 10–8 on a field near the college campus in Colorado Springs.
VT	November 6, 1886	Vermont	Dartmouth	Burlington, Vermont	91–0	First organized intercollegiate football game in Vermont.
NC	October 18, 1888	Wake Forest	North Carolina	State Fairgrounds, Raleigh, North Carolina	6–4	First organized intercollegiate football game in North Carolina. The first "scientific game" occurred on Thanksgiving of the same year when North Carolina played Duke (then Trinity) at Raleigh Athletic Park. Duke won 16 to 0.
WI	November 29, 1888	Racine College	Lake Forest	Racine, Wisconsin	6–4	First organized intercollegiate football game in Wisconsin. Lake Forest claims it was just the sixteenth team in the nation.
OH	December 8, 1888	Miami (OH)	Cincinnati	Old Main lawn, Oxford, Ohio	0–0	First organized intercollegiate football game in Ohio. The "Victory Bell" is one of the sport's oldest rivalries. The first game was played in a freezing rain. The first organized football game in Ohio involving a college occurred October 23, 1885 when Cincinnati and Mount Auburn Athletic Club tied 0-0 in Cincinnati.
SD	May 3, 1889	South Dakota State	South Dakota	Sioux Falls Fairgrounds, Sioux Falls, Dakota Territory	6–6	First organized intercollegiate football game in territory that would become South Dakota. "The foot ball resulted in a draw and the prize of $15 was divided between Vermillion [South Dakota] and Brookings [South Dakota State]."
CA	1889	USC	Loyola Marymount	Los Angeles, California	40–0	First organized intercollegiate football game in California. First Pacific Coast game. The first organized football game in California involving a college occurred December 2, 1882 when Cal lost a rugby football game to Phoenix Club 7–4 in San Francisco. The first organized American football game in California involving a college occurred January 16, 1886 when Cal defeated a club team called the Wasps 20–2 at West Field in Berkeley.
RI	October 23, 1889	Brown	Tufts	Pawtucket, Rhode Island	16–0	First organized intercollegiate football game in Rhode Island. Brown may have played an organized intercollegiate game in Rhode Island as early as 1886 against Boston University, but it is unclear whether that game was played in Massachusetts or in Rhode Island.
IA	November 16, 1889	Grinnell	Iowa	Field on South Campus, Grinnell, Iowa	24–0	First organized intercollegiate football game in Iowa. At least one Associated Press article claims this is the first game west of the Mississippi River. However, by November 1889 intercollegiate games had already been played west of the Mississippi River in Colorado and Dakota Territory, and possibly in California. As a technical matter, the first intercollegiate game played west of the Mississippi River was the 1882 contest between Minnesota and Hamline. Though both university campuses are east of the river, Minnesota and Hamline played at Minneapolis' King's Fair Ground just west of the river.
SC	December 14, 1889	Wofford	Furman	Encampment Grounds, Spartanburg, South Carolina	5–1	First organized intercollegiate football game in South Carolina. The game was essentially soccer, featured no uniforms, no positions, and the rules were formulated before the game. First game in the Deep South.
DE	October 11, 1890	Delaware	Swarthmore (Sophomores)	Newark, Delaware	30–0	First organized intercollegiate football game in Delaware. "In Newark, when news leaked out in 1889 that the college boys were going to play football Sheriff Bill Simmons swore up and down Main Street that the first corpse carried off the field would mean the end of the game." The first organized football game in Delaware involving a college occurred October 26, 1889 when the Delaware Field Club defeated Delaware 74–0 at Union Park in Wilmington.
KS	November 22, 1890	Baker	Kansas	Baldwin City, Kansas	22–9	First organized intercollegiate football game in Kansas. The first organized football game in Kansas involving a college occurred March 1, 1890 when Wichita University lost to Lewis Academy 4-2 on the WU campus in Wichita.
MO	November 27, 1890	Washington (MO)	Missouri	Sportsman's Park, St. Louis, Missouri	28–0	First organized intercollegiate football game in Missouri. The first organized football game in Missouri involving a college occurred on December 3, 1887 when Washington (MO) defeated the University Club 14–4 at Union Park in St. Louis.
TN	November 27, 1890	Vanderbilt	Nashville	Athletic Park, Nashville, Tennessee	40–0	First organized intercollegiate football game in Tennessee.
WA	January 24, 1891	Washington College	Washington	Tacoma Base Ball Park, Tacoma, Washington	6–6	First organized intercollegiate football game in Washington. Later sources suggest the game was a 0-0 tie played on Thanksgiving Day 1890, but period sources show a 6-6 tie played in January 1891. The first organized football game in Washington involving a college occurred November 28, 1889 when a team of Eastern College Alumni defeated Washington 20–0 at Jackson Street Baseball Park in Seattle.
NE	February 14, 1891	Doane	Nebraska	Field "west of the reservoir", Crete, Nebraska	18–0	First organized intercollegiate football game in Nebraska. The first organized football game in Nebraska involving a college occurred November 27, 1890 when Nebraska defeated Omaha YMCA 10–0 at "the base ball park, North Twentieth street" in Omaha.
WV	November 28, 1891	West Virginia	Washington & Jefferson	Show Lot, Morgantown, West Virginia	72–0	First organized intercollegiate football game in West Virginia.
GA	January 30, 1892	Georgia	Mercer	Herty Field, Athens, Georgia	50–0	First organized intercollegiate football game in Georgia.
UT	November 25, 1892	Utah State	Utah	The Quad, Logan, Utah Territory	12–0	First organized intercollegiate football game in territory that would become Utah.
AL	February 22, 1893	Auburn	Alabama	Lakeview Park, Birmingham, Alabama	32–22	First organized intercollegiate football game in Alabama. The first organized football game in Alabama involving a college occurred November 11, 1892 when Alabama defeated a picked team of players from Birmingham high schools 52–0.
OR	November 3, 1893	Western Oregon	Pacific (OR)	Monmouth, Oregon	53–0	First organized intercollegiate football game in Oregon.
MS	November 11, 1893	Mississippi	Union (TN)	University Athletic Park, Oxford, Mississippi	56–0	First organized intercollegiate football game in Mississippi.
LA	November 25, 1893	Tulane	LSU	Crescent City Base Ball Park, New Orleans, Louisiana	34–0	First organized intercollegiate football game in Louisiana. The first organized football game in Louisiana involving a college occurred November 18, 1893 when Southern Athletic Club defeated Tulane 12–0 in New Orleans. The first intramural games in the state occurred at Tulane on New Year's Day, 1890 by dividing students into two teams. The game was introduced to Tulane by Hugh and Thomas Bayne, who played the game at Yale University.
NM	January 1, 1894	New Mexico	New Mexico State	Albuquerque, New Mexico Territory	18–6	First organized intercollegiate football game in territory that would become New Mexico. First game in the southwest. The first organized football game in territory that would become New Mexico involving a college occurred October 10, 1892 when Albuquerque High School defeated New Mexico 5–0 in Albuquerque.
TX	October 19, 1894	Texas	Texas A&M	Hyde Park Racetrack, Austin, Texas	38–0	First organized intercollegiate football game in Texas. The first organized football games in Texas involving a college both occurred November 30, 1893. Texas defeated the Dallas Football Club 18–16 at Fair Park in Dallas; while Austin College defeated a Dallas club team 16–4 in Sherman.
ND	November 3, 1894	North Dakota	North Dakota State	Grand Forks, North Dakota	24–6	First organized intercollegiate football game in North Dakota.
ID	November 18, 1894	Idaho	Washington State	Moscow Baseball Grounds, Moscow, Idaho	10–0	First organized intercollegiate football game in Idaho. Later sources may suggest a 22-0 Idaho win played in May 1894, but Washington St. and Idaho record books, as well as period sources, show a 10-0 Washington St. victory played on November 18, 1894.
WY	November 25, 1895	Wyoming	Northern Colorado	Prexy's Pasture, Laramie, Wyoming	34–0	First organized intercollegiate football game in Wyoming. The first organized football game in Wyoming involving a college occurred February 22, 1894 when Wyoming defeated Cheyenne High School 14–0 in Laramie.
OK	February 1, 1896	Tulsa	Bacone	Muskogee, Indian Territory	Forfeit W	First organized intercollegiate football game in territory that would become Oklahoma. Henry Kendall College won the game by forfeit when Indian University left the field in the second half due to an uncalled "foul tackle". The first organized football game involving a college in territory that would become Oklahoma occurred on December 14, 1895 when the 'Oklahoma City Terrors' defeated the Oklahoma Sooners 34 to 0. The Terrors were a mix of Methodist college students and high schoolers. The Sooners did not manage a single first down. By next season, Oklahoma coach John A. Harts had left to prospect for gold in the Arctic. Organized football was first played in Oklahoma Territory on November 29, 1894 between the Oklahoma City Terrors and Oklahoma City High School. The high school won 24 to 0.
NV	November 28, 1896	Nevada	California (Junior Varsity)	Reno, Nevada	40–0	First organized intercollegiate football game in Nevada. The first organized football game in Nevada involving a college may have occurred October 24, 1896 when Nevada defeated Wadsworth 30-0 in Reno.
MT	November 12, 1897	Montana	Butte Business College	Missoula, Montana	20–4	First organized intercollegiate football game in Montana. The first organized football game in Montana involving a college occurred September 15, 1895 when the Butte Football Club defeated Iowa State 12–10 in Butte. ISU head coach Pop Warner apparently bet heavily on his team to win the game and only begrudgingly settled those bets after the loss.
AR	November 25, 1897	Ouachita Baptist	Arkansas	Arkadelphia, Arkansas	24–0	First organized intercollegiate football game in Arkansas that is claimed by both participants. On November 28, 1895 Ouachita Baptist defeated Arkadelphia Methodist College (now Henderson State) 8–0 in Arkadelphia. Henderson State claims this as an organized game and dates the beginning of both its football program and the Battle of the Ravine to 1895. However, Ouachita Baptist does not consider this to be an official game and dates the beginning of its program to 1896 and the Battle of the Ravine to 1907. The first organized football game in Arkansas involving a college occurred October 13, 1894 when Arkansas defeated Fort Smith High School 42–0 in Fayetteville.
AZ	November 30, 1899	Arizona	Arizona State	Carrillo Gardens, Tucson, Arizona Territory	11–2	First organized intercollegiate football game in territory that would become Arizona. The first organized football game in territory that would become Arizona involving a college was played in either 1897 or 1898. Arizona State records show a 38-20 loss to Phoenix Indian School in 1897. However, the first game reported by the Arizona Republican was a 16-6 ASU loss to Phoenix High School on January 22, 1898 in Phoenix.
FL	November 22, 1901	Stetson	Florida Agricultural College (predecessor of Florida)	North Main St. Fairgrounds, Jacksonville, Florida	6–0	First organized intercollegiate football game in Florida. Stetson beat Florida Agricultural College at Lake City, one of the four forerunners of the University of Florida, 6–0, in a game played as part of the Jacksonville Fair. A sure score by FAC was obstructed by a tree stump. The first intramural games in the state occurred when Stetson teams played a 7-game intramural series in 1894.
HI	December 25, 1920	Hawaii	Nevada	Alexander Field, Honolulu, Hawaii Territory	14–0	First organized intercollegiate football game in territory that would become Hawaii. The first organized football game in territory that would become Hawaii involving a college occurred October 23, 1909 when Hawaii defeated McKinley High School 6–5 on Alexander Field at Oahu College. Some may view the October 30, 1909 game between Hawaii and Oahu College to be the state's first intercollegiate game. However, Oahu College was never a postsecondary school and the University of Hawaii records its first intercollegiate football game as the 1920 contest against Nevada.
AK	January 1, 1949	Alaska–Fairbanks	Ladd Air Force Base	Fairbanks, Alaska Territory	0–0	First organized football game in territory that would become Alaska involving a college. Alaska has not hosted an organized intercollegiate college football game.
