= 1890 Virginia Orange and Blue football team =

American college football season

1890 Virginia Orange and Blue football

Southern champion
- Conference: Independent
- Record: 5–2
- Head coach: None
- Captain: William W. Daggett
- Home stadium: Madison Hall Field

1890 Southern college football independents records
	Conf.			Overall
Team	W	L	T	W		L		T
Furman		–		2	–	0	–	0
Vanderbilt		–		1	–	0	–	0
Virginia		–		5	–	2	–	0
Navy		–		5	–	1	–	1
Delaware		–		3	–	2	–	0
Georgetown		–		3	–	3	–	1
Columbian		–		2	–	3	–	0
Johns Hopkins		–		0	–	1	–	0
Nashville		–		0	–	1	–	0
Trinity (NC)		–		0	–	1	–	0
Richmond		–		0	–	3	–	0

The 1890 Virginia Orange and Blue football team represented the University of Virginia as an independent the 1890 college football season. The team had no known coach, and went 5–2 and claims a Southern championship. The 115–0 drubbing by Princeton signaled football's arrival in the south.

== Schedule ==
Date	Time	Opponent	Site	Result	Attendance	Source
October 31	4:15 p.m.	vs. Penn	Capitol Park; Washington, DC	L 0–72	1,000+	
November 1		vs. Princeton	Oriole Park; Baltimore, MD	L 0–115		
November 10		vs. Dickinson	Madison Hall Field; Charlottesville, VA	W 14–10	400	
November 21	3:30 p.m.	Lafayette	Madison Hall Field; Charlottesville, VA	W 20–14		
November 24		vs. Randolph–Macon	Madison Hall Field; Charlottesville, VA	W 136–0		
November 26		at Washington and Lee	Lexington, VA	W 46–0		
November 29	3:00 p.m.	vs. Trinity (NC)	Island Park; Richmond, VA	W 10–4		
