= Snow Bowl =

Snow Bowl or Snowbowl may refer to:

== Sporting events ==
A nickname for various gridiron football games played during snowy conditions:

Canadian Football League (CFL)
Snow bowl(2026)

- 84th Grey Cup (1996), between the Toronto Argonauts and Edmonton Eskimos
- 105th Grey Cup (2017), between the Toronto Argonauts and Calgary Stampeders

College football (NCAA)

- Snow Bowl (1950), match-up of the Michigan Wolverines at Ohio State Buckeyes
- Snow Bowl, 1992 match-up of the Penn State Nittany Lions at Notre Dame Fighting Irish (recap)
- 2000 Independence Bowl, between the Mississippi State Bulldogs and Texas A&M Aggies
- The Snow Bowl, an NCAA Division II East-West all-star game held in Fargo, North Dakota, from 1994 through 2000.

National Football League (NFL)

- 1948 NFL Championship Game, between the Chicago Cardinals and Philadelphia Eagles
- Snow Bowl (1985), week 13 match-up of the Tampa Bay Buccaneers and Green Bay Packers
- Tuck Rule Game, 2001 AFC Divisional Playoff match-up of the Oakland Raiders and New England Patriots
- Snow Bowl (2017), week 14 match-up of the Indianapolis Colts and Buffalo Bills

== Places ==
All in the United States

- Arizona Snowbowl, a ski area near Flagstaff, Arizona
- Camden Snow Bowl, a ski area in Camden, Maine
- Middlebury College Snow Bowl, a ski area in Hancock, Vermont
- Montana Snowbowl, a ski area near Missoula, Montana

== See also ==
- Ice Bowl (disambiguation)
- Freezer Bowl
- Snow Globe Game
