= Ice Bowl =

The term Ice Bowl may refer to several different sporting events that are or were scheduled during cold weather:

- Ice Bowl (Alaska), a college football game held in Fairbanks, Alaska from 1948 to 1952
- Ice Bowl, nickname for the 1947 Cotton Bowl Classic, a postseason college football game between the Arkansas Razorbacks and LSU Tigers
- Ice Bowl, nickname for the 1967 NFL Championship Game between the Dallas Cowboys and the Green Bay Packers
- Ice Bowl, the nickname for the 65th Grey Cup, the 1977 Canadian Football League Grey Cup
- Ice Bowl, the home skating rink of the Invicta Dynamos, a professional ice hockey team in Kent, England
- Ice Bowl, the nickname for the 2008 NHL Winter Classic, an outdoor hockey game played between the Buffalo Sabres and the Pittsburgh Penguins
- Ice Bowl, an annual collection of disc golf charity and awareness-raising tournaments held each winter at courses around the world

== See also ==
- Bowl game
- Freezer Bowl
- Snow Bowl (disambiguation)
