= 1890 Trinity Blue and White football team =

American college football season

1890 Trinity Blue and White football
- Conference: Independent
- Record: 0–1
- Head coach: None
- Captain: Robert L. Durham

1890 Southern college football independents records
	Conf.			Overall
Team	W	L	T	W		L		T
Furman		–		2	–	0	–	0
Vanderbilt		–		1	–	0	–	0
Virginia		–		5	–	2	–	0
Navy		–		5	–	1	–	1
Delaware		–		3	–	2	–	0
Georgetown		–		3	–	3	–	1
Columbian		–		2	–	3	–	0
Johns Hopkins		–		0	–	1	–	0
Nashville		–		0	–	1	–	0
Trinity (NC)		–		0	–	1	–	0
Richmond		–		0	–	3	–	0

The 1890 Trinity Blue and White football team was an American football team that represented Trinity College (later renamed Duke University) as an independent during the 1890 college football season. The team compiled a 0–1 record. The team had no coach; Robert L. Durham was the team captain.

== Schedule ==
Date	Time	Opponent	Site	Result	Source
November 29	3:00 p.m.	vs. Virginia	Island Park; Richmond, VA	L 4–10	
All times are in Eastern time
