= E. H. Jones =

E. H. Jones may refer to:

- E. H. Jones (author) (1883–1942), World War I author
- E. H. Jones (coach), Missouri Tigers football coach
- Elliott Jones, Vanderbilt Commodores football player and coach
