= 1890 Columbian Orange and Blue football team =

American college football season

1890 Columbian Orange and Blue football
- Conference: Independent
- Record: 2–3
- Head coach: None

1890 Southern college football independents records
	Conf.			Overall
Team	W	L	T	W		L		T
Furman		–		2	–	0	–	0
Vanderbilt		–		1	–	0	–	0
Virginia		–		5	–	2	–	0
Navy		–		5	–	1	–	1
Delaware		–		3	–	2	–	0
Georgetown		–		3	–	3	–	1
Columbian		–		2	–	3	–	0
Johns Hopkins		–		0	–	1	–	0
Nashville		–		0	–	1	–	0
Trinity (NC)		–		0	–	1	–	0
Richmond		–		0	–	3	–	0

The 1890 Columbian Orange and Blue football team was an American football team that represented Columbian University (now known as George Washington University) as an independent during the 1890 college football season. The Orange and Blue had a 2–3 record with no head coach. It was their first season since 1883 and their last before 1895.

== Schedule ==
Date	Opponent	Site	Result
November 8	Kalorama AC	Washington, DC	W 10–0
November 10	Gallaudet Sophomores	Washington, DC	L 6–22
November 14	Emerson Institute	Washington, DC	W 8–4
November 15	Georgetown JV	Washington, DC	L 0–6
November 21	Alexandria Episcopal High School	Alexandria, VA	L 0–22
