= 1890 Vanderbilt Commodores football team =

American college football season

1890 Vanderbilt Commodores football
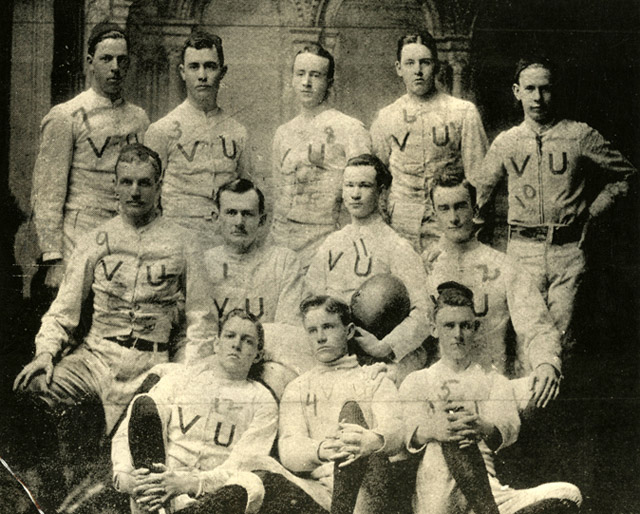
- Conference: Independent
- Record: 1–0
- Head coach: Elliott Jones (1st season)
- Captain: Elliott Jones

1890 Southern college football independents records
	Conf.			Overall
Team	W	L	T	W		L		T
Furman		–		2	–	0	–	0
Vanderbilt		–		1	–	0	–	0
Virginia		–		5	–	2	–	0
Navy		–		5	–	1	–	1
Delaware		–		3	–	2	–	0
Georgetown		–		3	–	3	–	1
Columbian		–		2	–	3	–	0
Johns Hopkins		–		0	–	1	–	0
Nashville		–		0	–	1	–	0
Trinity (NC)		–		0	–	1	–	0
Richmond		–		0	–	3	–	0

The 1890 Vanderbilt Commodores football team represented Vanderbilt University during the 1890 college football season. The team's head coach and team captain was Elliott Jones, who served his first season in that capacity. In its inaugural season of play, Vandy played only one game, in Nashville, Tennessee, against Nashville Peabody Normal School.

== Schedule ==
Date	Opponent	Site	Result	Source
November 27	Nashville, (Peabody Normal School)	Nashville's Athletic Park; Nashville, TN	W 40–0	

== Vanderbilt’s first game ==
Vanderbilt chemistry professor William Lofland Dudley was a member of the Vanderbilt Athletic Association, formed in 1886 with Dr. W. M. Baskerville as president. Most students at Vanderbilt were members. The early sports played on the Vanderbilt campus were baseball, bicycling, and track and field events.

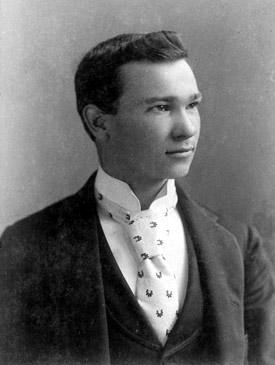
Elliott Jones.

Vanderbilt played its first football game in 1890 at Nashville Athletic Park, against Nashville (Peabody). Vanderbilt won 40 to 0. Captain and fullback Elliott Jones recalled the meeting which beget the game. Dudley called for a meeting of the Athletic Association, after Peabody had issued a challenge to play a contest on Thanksgiving Day. He felt the challenge a serious matter; that the pride of the university was at stake. In front of some 150 students in the gymnasium, Dudley explained that if the challenge were met, a new era of athletics would be created with the game of football. From his Kansas City law office many years later Jones remembered: "There followed a general discussion of the whole situation. The difficulties, particularly the shortness of time for preparation, and the fact that regular football had not been theretofore played at Vanderbilt at all, were dealt upon. Many thought that it would be unfair to ourselves to hazard a contest under the circumstances. We knew that Peabody Normal had been playing intramural football for several years. The predominating note, however, for discussion was that we had never taken anything off Peabody Normal and should not do now. Finally, P. M. (Pat) Estes, then of St. Louis, made a motion to the effect that the challenge be accepted and that E. H. Jones be authorized and directed to organize and captain a team for the occasion. The motion was unanimously carried."

Of Dudley, Elliott Jones said: "Too much cannot be said about Dr. William L. Dudley in connection with early football at Vanderbilt. Since college days his picture has adored my office wall, and when asked by any one who the gentleman is, I always reply, 'The best friend of myself and every other student at Vanderbilt, in my college days.' He went with the team on every trip, and watched over us like a father.

"He was our inspiration as well as our guardian. He was our true and loyal friend, under any and all circumstances, in adversity as well in prosperity. I have never known a more lovable, more genuine friend. I cherish the memory of his friendship above all else in my college experience."

== Roster ==
=== Line ===
Player	Position
A. Allen	left end
Rip Allen	right end
Charles Baskerville	right tackle
W. W. Craig	left tackle
W. H. Hardin	center
B. Knapp	right guard
Phillip H. Porter	left guard

=== Backfield ===
Player	Position
Pat Estes	quarterback
Horace E. Bemis	halfback
R. H. Mitchell	halfback
Elliott Jones	fullback

=== Substitutes ===
Player
John C. Wall
Herman D. Ruhm

== See also ==
- List of the first college football games in each U.S. state
