= 1890 Georgetown football team =

American college football season

1890 Georgetown football
- Conference: Independent
- Record: 3–3–1
- Head coach: Pat O'Donnell (1st season)
- Captain: Pat O'Donnell
- Home stadium: Old Georgetown Field

1890 Southern college football independents records
	Conf.			Overall
Team	W	L	T	W		L		T
Furman		–		2	–	0	–	0
Vanderbilt		–		1	–	0	–	0
Virginia		–		5	–	2	–	0
Navy		–		5	–	1	–	1
Delaware		–		3	–	2	–	0
Georgetown		–		3	–	3	–	1
Columbian		–		2	–	3	–	0
Johns Hopkins		–		0	–	1	–	0
Nashville		–		0	–	1	–	0
Trinity (NC)		–		0	–	1	–	0
Richmond		–		0	–	3	–	0

The 1890 Georgetown football team represented the Georgetown University during the 1890 college football season. Georgetown finished the season with a 3–3–1 record. During the second game of the season, Columbia AC left the field during the first half with the score 4–0 in favor of Georgetown, and forfeited the game.

== Schedule ==
Date	Opponent	Site	Result	Attendance	Source
October 21	Gallaudet	Old Georgetown Field; Washington, DC	W 6–4		
October 28	Columbia Athletic Club	Old Georgetown Field; Washington, DC	W 4–0		
November 1	at Navy	Worden Field; Annapolis, MD	L 4–70		
November 11	at Washington and Lee	Campus Field; Lexington, VA	W 10–6		
November 15	Swarthmore	Capitol Park; Washington, DC	L 0–20		
November 20	at Fordham	Fordham Field; Bronx, NY	T 6–6		
November 27	Columbia Athletic Club	Capitol Park; Washington, DC	L 4–22	> 2,500	
