= 1890 Furman Baptists football team =

American college football season

1890 Furman Baptists football
- Conference: Independent
- Record: 2–0
- Head coach: H. C. Granger (1st season)

1890 Southern college football independents records
	Conf.			Overall
Team	W	L	T	W		L		T
Furman		–		2	–	0	–	0
Vanderbilt		–		1	–	0	–	0
Virginia		–		5	–	2	–	0
Navy		–		5	–	1	–	1
Delaware		–		3	–	2	–	0
Georgetown		–		3	–	3	–	1
Columbian		–		2	–	3	–	0
Johns Hopkins		–		0	–	1	–	0
Nashville		–		0	–	1	–	0
Trinity (NC)		–		0	–	1	–	0
Richmond		–		0	–	3	–	0

The 1890 Furman Baptists football team represented Furman University as an independent during the 1890 college football season. Led by H. C. Granger in his first and only season as head coach, Furman compiled a record of 2–0.

== Schedule ==
Date	Opponent	Site	Result
Jan 24, 1891	Wofford		W 12–0
Mar 21, 1891	Wofford		W 28–2
