= C. T. Taylor =

American football coach

Biographical details
- Born: October 21, 1867; Chesterfield County, Virginia, U.S.
- Died: May 18, 1934 (aged 66); Loudoun County, Virginia, U.S.
- Education: University of Richmond (M.A.)

Coaching career (HC unless noted)
- 1890: Richmond

Head coaching record
- Overall: 0–3

Charles Thomas Taylor (October 21, 1867 – May 18, 1934) was an American college football coach. He was the fifth head football coach at Richmond College—now known as the University of Richmond—serving for one season in 1890 and compiling a record of 0–3. He later became a minister.

== Head coaching record ==
Year	Team	Overall	Conference	Standing	Bowl/playoffs
Richmond Colts (Independent) (1890)
1890	Richmond	0–3			
Richmond:		0–3			
Total:		0–3			
