= 1890 Nashville Garnet and Blue football team =

American college football season

1890 Nashville Garnet and Blue football
- Conference: Independent
- Record: 0–1

1890 Southern college football independents records
| | Conf. | | | Overall |
| Team | W | L | T | W | | L | | T |
|---|---|---|---|---|---|---|---|---|
| Furman | | – | | 2 | – | 0 | – | 0 |
| Vanderbilt | | – | | 1 | – | 0 | – | 0 |
| Virginia | | – | | 5 | – | 2 | – | 0 |
| Navy | | – | | 5 | – | 1 | – | 1 |
| Delaware | | – | | 3 | – | 2 | – | 0 |
| Georgetown | | – | | 3 | – | 3 | – | 1 |
| Columbian | | – | | 2 | – | 3 | – | 0 |
| Johns Hopkins | | – | | 0 | – | 1 | – | 0 |
| Nashville | | – | | 0 | – | 1 | – | 0 |
| Trinity (NC) | | – | | 0 | – | 1 | – | 0 |
| Richmond | | – | | 0 | – | 3 | – | 0 |

The 1890 Nashville Garnet and Blue football team represented the University of Nashville during the 1890 college football season. The team played only one game, in Nashville, Tennessee, sending a challenge to Vanderbilt University. Vanderbilt played its first game, and won 40–0.

== Schedule ==
| Date | Opponent | Site | Result | Source |
|---|---|---|---|---|
| November 27 | Vanderbilt | Nashville’s Athletic Park; Nashville, TN | L 0–40 | |

== See also ==
- List of the first college football games in each US state
