= 1890 Richmond Colts football team =

American college football season

1890 Richmond Colts football
- Conference: Independent
- Record: 0–3
- Head coach: C. T. Taylor (1st season)
- Captain: Dana Rucker

1890 Southern college football independents records
	Conf.			Overall
Team	W	L	T	W		L		T
Furman		–		2	–	0	–	0
Vanderbilt		–		1	–	0	–	0
Virginia		–		5	–	2	–	0
Navy		–		5	–	1	–	1
Delaware		–		3	–	2	–	0
Georgetown		–		3	–	3	–	1
Columbian		–		2	–	3	–	0
Johns Hopkins		–		0	–	1	–	0
Nashville		–		0	–	1	–	0
Trinity (NC)		–		0	–	1	–	0
Richmond		–		0	–	3	–	0

The 1890 Richmond Colts football team was an American football team that represented Richmond College—now known as the University of Richmond—as an independent during the 1890 college football season. The team went winless and was coached by University of Richmond alumnus C. T. Taylor.

== Schedule ==
Date	Opponent	Site	Result	Source
November 1	at Randolph–Macon	Ashland, VA	L 4–6	
November 20	at Washington and Lee	Lexington, VA	L 6–28	
November 27	Randolph–Macon	Richmond College campus; Richmond, VA	L 0–4	
