= Ice Bowl (Alaska) =

The Ice Bowl was a college football game held in Fairbanks, Alaska between 1948 and 1952 and contested by the University of Alaska Fairbanks football team and a team from the Ladd Air Force Base.

The game took place in the first week of January, around the same time as the major bowl games in the Continental United States.

The series featured two scoreless tie games and a win apiece for each team before being discontinued in 1952, as interest in football at UAF began to decline in the early 1950s, with the school devoting its athletic resources to more "northern" sports such as ice hockey and skiing.

== Game result ==
Date	Winner		Loser	
January 1, 1949	Alaska	0	Ladd AFB	0
January 2, 1950	Alaska	3	Ladd AFB	0
January 1, 1951	Alaska	0	Ladd AFB	0
December 30, 1952	Ladd AFB	47	Alaska	0

Italics denote a tie game.

== See also ==
- List of the first college football game in each US state
