= 1890 Delaware football team =

American college football season

1890 Delaware football
- Conference: Independent
- Record: 3–2
- Head coach: None

1890 Southern college football independents records
	Conf.			Overall
Team	W	L	T	W		L		T
Furman		–		2	–	0	–	0
Vanderbilt		–		1	–	0	–	0
Virginia		–		5	–	2	–	0
Navy		–		5	–	1	–	1
Delaware		–		3	–	2	–	0
Georgetown		–		3	–	3	–	1
Columbian		–		2	–	3	–	0
Johns Hopkins		–		0	–	1	–	0
Nashville		–		0	–	1	–	0
Trinity (NC)		–		0	–	1	–	0
Richmond		–		0	–	3	–	0

The 1890 Delaware football team represented Delaware College—now known as the University of Delaware—as an independent during the 1890 college football season.

The game against the Swarthmore Sophomores was the first organized intercollegiate football game in Delaware. "In Newark, when news leaked out in 1889 that the college boys were going to play football Sheriff Bill Simmons swore up and down Main Street that the first corpse carried off the field would mean the end of the game."

== Schedule ==
Date	Opponent	Site	Result
October 4	at Swarthmore	Swarthmore, PA	L 0–54
October 11	Swarthmore sophomores	Newark, DE	L 0–30
October 18	at Del. Field Club of Wilmington	Wilmington, DE	W 6–0
October 23	at Wilmington Friends School	Wilmington, DE	W 12–0
November 20	Delaware sophomores	Homewood Driving Park; Newark, DE	W 8–0
