= Horace E. Bemis =

American-football player (1868–1914)

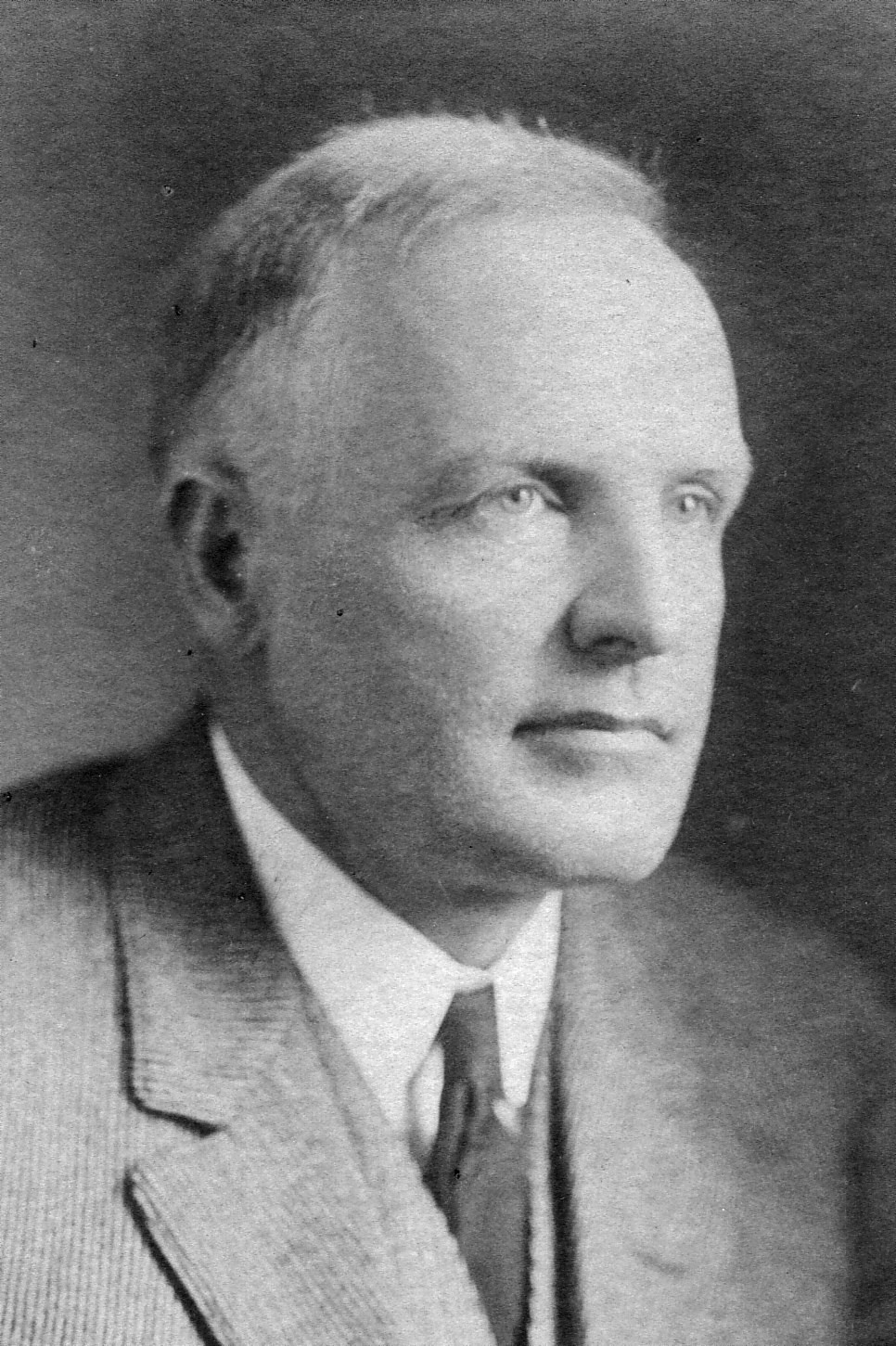
- Born: November 30, 1868; Clinton, Iowa
- Died: April 1, 1914 (aged 45); Prescott, Arkansas
- Occupation: Lumber dealer
- Football career

Vanderbilt Commodores
- Position: Halfback
- Class: B. S., 1891

Personal information
- Born: November 30, 1868; Clinton, Iowa
- Died: April 1, 1914 (aged 45); Prescott, Arkansas

Career information
- College: Vanderbilt (1890)

Horace Erastus Bemis (November 30, 1868 – April 1, 1914) was a college football player and lumber dealer. Bemis was a prominent halfback for the Vanderbilt Commodores football team. On the inaugural 1890 team, he provided most of the offense.

== Early life ==
Horace E. Bemis was born on November 30, 1868, in Clinton, Iowa, the son of James Harvey Bemis and Hannah Douglas Knox. In 1869 his family moved to Jefferson, Texas, where he spent his childhood. In 1884 he went to school in Chester, Pennsylvania, where he developed his fondness for athletics.

== Ozan Lumber Company ==
In 1891, J.H. Bemis and his cousin Benjamin Whitaker opened a mill in Prescott, Arkansas, calling it the Ozan Lumber Company. Bemis would operate the mill in partnership with his brothers, J.W. Bemis and William N. Bemis, and it would eventually see its greatest success under W.N. Bemis's son, James Rosborough Bemis. Over the course of the next decade the mill became extremely successful, with the Bemis family becoming especially wealthy as a result. J.H. Bemis died in 1918, leaving his sons to run the company.

== Death ==
Horace Bemis died on April 1, 1914.
