= Elliott Jones =

American football player and coach (1870–1951)

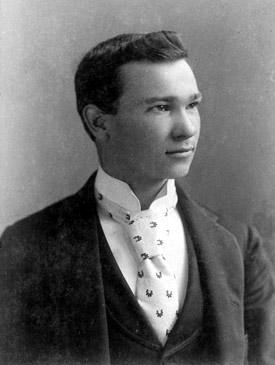

Biographical details
- Born: July 18, 1870; Camden, Alabama, U.S.
- Died: October 11, 1951 (aged 81); Kansas City, Missouri, U.S.
- Education: Vanderbilt University (AB); Vanderbilt University Law School (LLB)

Playing career
- 1890–1892: Vanderbilt
- Position: Fullback

Coaching career (HC unless noted)
- 1890–1892: Vanderbilt

Head coaching record
- Overall: 8–5

Elliott Hamilton Jones (July 18, 1870 – October 11, 1951) was an American football player and coach. He served as the first head football coach at Vanderbilt University. Jones played and coached with the Vanderbilt Commodores as team captain for three seasons from 1890 to 1892, compiling a record of 8–5. He went on to work as a lawyer, police commissioner and councilman in Kansas City, Missouri.

== Early life ==
Elliott Hamilton Jones was born on July 18, 1870, in Camden, Alabama, to Mary (née Scott) and John Archibald Jones. His father served in the Civil War with the Confederate States Army. At the age of fifteen, he moved to Cambridge, Massachusetts and was educated at the Boston Latin School. He then worked with his great uncle Henry Oscar Houghton at his company Houghton Mifflin & Co. He entered Vanderbilt University in 1887. He graduated from Vanderbilt with a Bachelor of Arts in 1891. He graduated from Vanderbilt University Law School with a Bachelor of Laws in 1893. Jones was a team captain of the Vanderbilt Commodores and member of Phi Beta Kappa. He also played baseball and tennis at Vanderbilt.

== College years ==
=== The first game ===
Vanderbilt played its first football game in 1890 at Nashville Athletic Park, against Nashville (Peabody). Vanderbilt won 40 to 0. Jones, captain and fullback of the 1890 Vanderbilt Commodores football team, recalled the meeting which beget the game. William Lofland Dudley called for a meeting of the Athletic Association, after Peabody had issued a challenge to play a contest on Thanksgiving Day. He felt the challenge a serious matter; that the pride of the university was at stake. In front of some 150 students in the gymnasium, Dudley explained that if the challenge were met, a new era of athletics would be created with the game of football. From his Kansas City law office many years later Jones remembered: "There followed a general discussion of the whole situation. The difficulties, particularly the shortness of time for preparation, and the fact that regular football had not been theretofore played at Vanderbilt at all, were dealt upon. Many thought that it would be unfair to ourselves to hazard a contest under the circumstances. We knew that Peabody Normal had been playing intramural football for several years. The predominating note, however, for discussion was that we had never taken anything off Peabody Normal and should not do now. Finally, P. M. (Pat) Estes, then of St. Louis, made a motion to the effect that the challenge be accepted and that E. H. Jones be authorized and directed to organize and captain a team for the occasion. The motion was unanimously carried."

Of Dudley, Elliott Jones said:

"Too much cannot be said about Dr. William L. Dudley in connection with early football at Vanderbilt. Since college days his picture has adored my office wall, and when asked by any one who the gentleman is, I always reply, 'The best friend of myself and every other student at Vanderbilt, in my college days.' He went with the team on every trip, and watched over us like a father. "He was our inspiration as well as our guardian. He was our true and loyal friend, under any and all circumstances, in adversity as well in prosperity. I have never known a more lovable, more genuine friend. I cherish the memory of his friendship above all else in my college experience."

=== Head coaching record ===
| Year | Team | Overall | Conference | Standing | Bowl/playoffs |
|---|---|---|---|---|---|
Vanderbilt Commodores (Independent) (1890–1892)
| 1890 | Vanderbilt | 1–0 | | | |
| 1891 | Vanderbilt | 3–1 | | | |
| 1892 | Vanderbilt | 4–4 | | | |
| Vanderbilt: | | 8–5 | | | |
| Total: | | 8–5 | | | |

== Career ==
On August 1, 1893, Jones moved to Kansas City, Missouri and entered the law office of W. C. Scarritt. They organized the law firm of Scarritt, Griffin & Jones on January 1, 1896. He would remain with the firm for the rest of his life.

In 1907, Jones was appointed police commissioner by Governor Joseph W. Folk. In 1927, Jones was appointed as a member of the park board of Kansas City by Mayor Albert I. Beach. In 1930, Jones was elected as councilman at large from the third district of Kansas City. He was a Democrat.

== Personal life ==
Jones married Martha "Mattie" Scarritt on December 27, 1894. They had six children, Elliott Scarritt, Russell Houghton, Paul Jones, Winthrop G., Charles S. and Mrs. Donald Clark. His wife died in 1949. The Jones lived at 3400 Norledge Place in Kansas City. Jones was known for playing bridge and served as president of the Heart of America Bridge Club. He was friends with B. Clark Hyde, convicted murderer of real estate magnet Thomas Swope.

Jones died at the home of his son at 1002 West 63rd Street in Kansas City on October 11, 1951.
