= Pat Estes =

American football player, attorney, and businessman

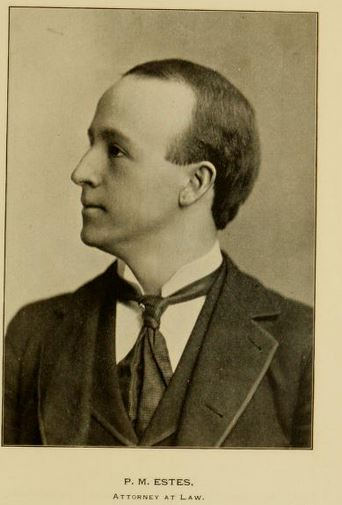
- Estes c. 1896
- Born: January 27, 1872; Brownsville, Tennessee, U.S.
- Died: February 16, 1947 (aged 75); Nashville, Tennessee, U.S.
- Occupation: Attorney
- Football career

Vanderbilt Commodores
- Position: Quarterback

Career information
- College: Richmond; Vanderbilt (1890); WashU

Patrick Mann Estes (January 27, 1872 – February 16, 1947) was an American college football player, attorney, and founder, part owner, and general counsel of the Life and Casualty Company of Nashville.

== Early years ==
Estes graduated from Richmond College with a B.A. degree in 1890. Later that same year, he enrolled at Vanderbilt University, where he became the first quarterback for the Vanderbilt Commodores football team. Estes later completed an LL.D. degree at Washington University in St. Louis in 1892,

== Attorney at law ==
Estes was then a law partner of Thomas James Tyne.
