= Early history of American football =

Aspect of sports history

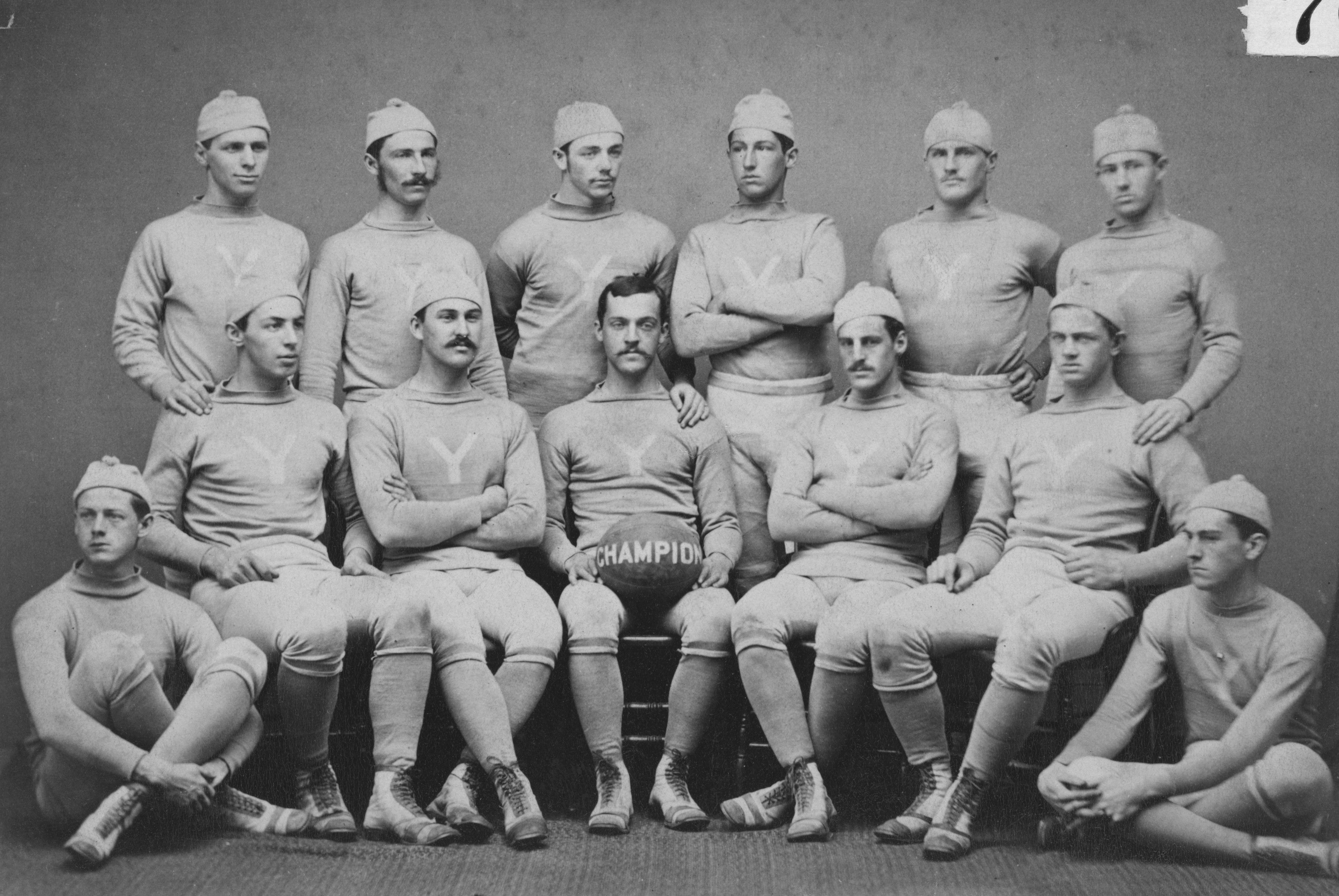
1876 Yale Bulldogs, national champions. Walter Camp is standing with arms crossed. Gene Baker is seated with the football.

The early history of American football can be traced to early versions of rugby football and association football. Both games have their origin in varieties of football played in Britain in the mid–19th century, in which a football is kicked at a goal or run over a line, which in turn were based on the varieties of English public school football games.

American football resulted from several major divergences from association football and rugby football, most notably the rule changes instituted by Walter Camp, a Yale University and Hopkins School graduate considered to be the "father of gridiron football". Among these important changes were the introduction of the line of scrimmage, of down-and-distance rules and of the legalization of interference.

In the late nineteenth and early twentieth centuries, gameplay developments by college coaches such as Eddie Cochems, Amos Alonzo Stagg, Parke H. Davis, Knute Rockne, John Heisman, and Glenn "Pop" Warner helped take advantage of the newly introduced forward pass. The popularity of college football grew in the United States for the first half of the 20th century. Bowl games, a college football tradition, attracted a national audience for college teams. Boosted by fierce rivalries and colorful traditions, college football still holds widespread appeal in the United States.

The origin of professional football can be traced back to 1892, with Pudge Heffelfinger's $500 contract to play in a game for the Allegheny Athletic Association against the Pittsburgh Athletic Club. In 1920 the American Professional Football Association was formed. This league changed its name to the National Football League (NFL) two years later, and eventually became the major league of American football. Initially a sport of Midwestern industrial towns, professional football eventually became a national phenomenon.

== History of American football before 1869 ==
=== Prehistory of American football ===
In 1911, influential American football historian Parke H. Davis wrote an early history of the game of football, tracing the sport's origins to ancient times:

abundant evidence may be marshalled to prove that this is the oldest outdoor game in existence. In the 22nd chapter of Isaiah is found the verse, "He will turn and toss thee like a ball." This allusion, slight as it may be, is sufficient unto the antiquary to indicate that some sort of game with a ball existed as early as 750 years before the Christian era, the epoch customarily assigned to the Book of Isaiah. A more specific allusion of the same period, however, is the passage in the Sixth Book of the Odyssey of Homer familiar to all school boys: "Then having bathed and anointed well with oil they took their midday meal upon the river's banks and anon when satisfied with food they played a game of ball."

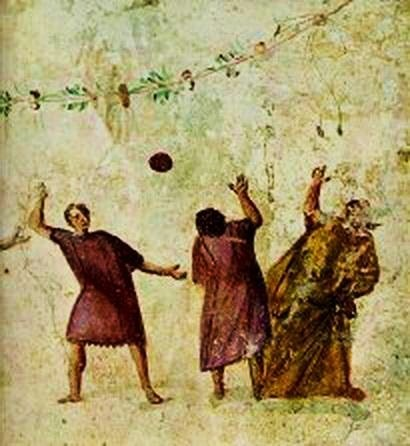
Harpastum, a form of ball game played in the Roman Empire.

Forms of traditional football have been played throughout Europe and beyond since antiquity. Many of these involved handling of the ball, and scrummage-like formations. Several of the oldest examples of football-like games include the Greek game of Episkyros and the Roman game of Harpastum. Over time many countries across the world have also developed their own national football-like games. For example, New Zealand had Kī-o-rahi, Australia marn grook, Japan kemari, China cuju, Georgia lelo burti, the Scottish Borders Jeddart Ba' and Cornwall Cornish hurling, Central Italy Calcio Fiorentino, South Wales cnapan, East Anglia Campball and Ireland had caid, which an ancestor of Gaelic football.

There is also one reference to ball games being played in southern Britain prior to the Norman Conquest. In the ninth century Nennius's Historia Britonum tells that a group of boys were playing at ball (pilae ludus). The origin of this account is either southern England or Wales. References to a ball game played in northern France known as La Soule or Choule, in which the ball was propelled by hands, feet, and sticks, date from the 12th century.

These archaic forms of football, typically classified as mob football, would be played between neighbouring towns and villages, involving an unlimited number of players on opposing teams, who would clash in a heaving mass of people struggling to drag an inflated pig's bladder by any means possible to markers at each end of a town. By some accounts, in some such events any means could be used to move the ball towards the goal, as long as it did not lead to manslaughter or murder. Sometimes instead of markers, the teams would attempt to kick the bladder into the balcony of the opponents' church. A legend that these games in England evolved from a more ancient and bloody ritual of kicking the "Dane's head" is unlikely to be true.

Few images of medieval football survive. One engraving from the early fourteenth century at Gloucester Cathedral, England, clearly shows two young men running vigorously towards each other with a ball in mid-air between them. There is a hint that the players may be using their hands to strike the ball. A second medieval image in the British Museum, London clearly shows a group of men with a large ball on the ground. The ball clearly has a seam where leather has been sewn together. It is unclear exactly what is happening in this set of three images, although the last image appears to show a man with a broken arm. It is likely that this image highlights the dangers of some medieval football games.

Most of the very early references to the game speak simply of "ball play" or "playing at ball". This reinforces the idea that the games played at the time did not necessarily involve a ball being kicked.

The first detailed description of what was almost certainly football in England was given by William FitzStephen in about 1174–1183. He described the activities of London youths during the annual festival of Shrove Tuesday:

After lunch all the youth of the city go out into the fields to take part in a ball game. The students of each school have their own ball; the workers from each city craft are also carrying their balls. Older citizens, fathers, and wealthy citizens come on horseback to watch their juniors competing, and to relive their own youth vicariously: you can see their inner passions aroused as they watch the action and get caught up in the fun being had by the carefree adolescents.

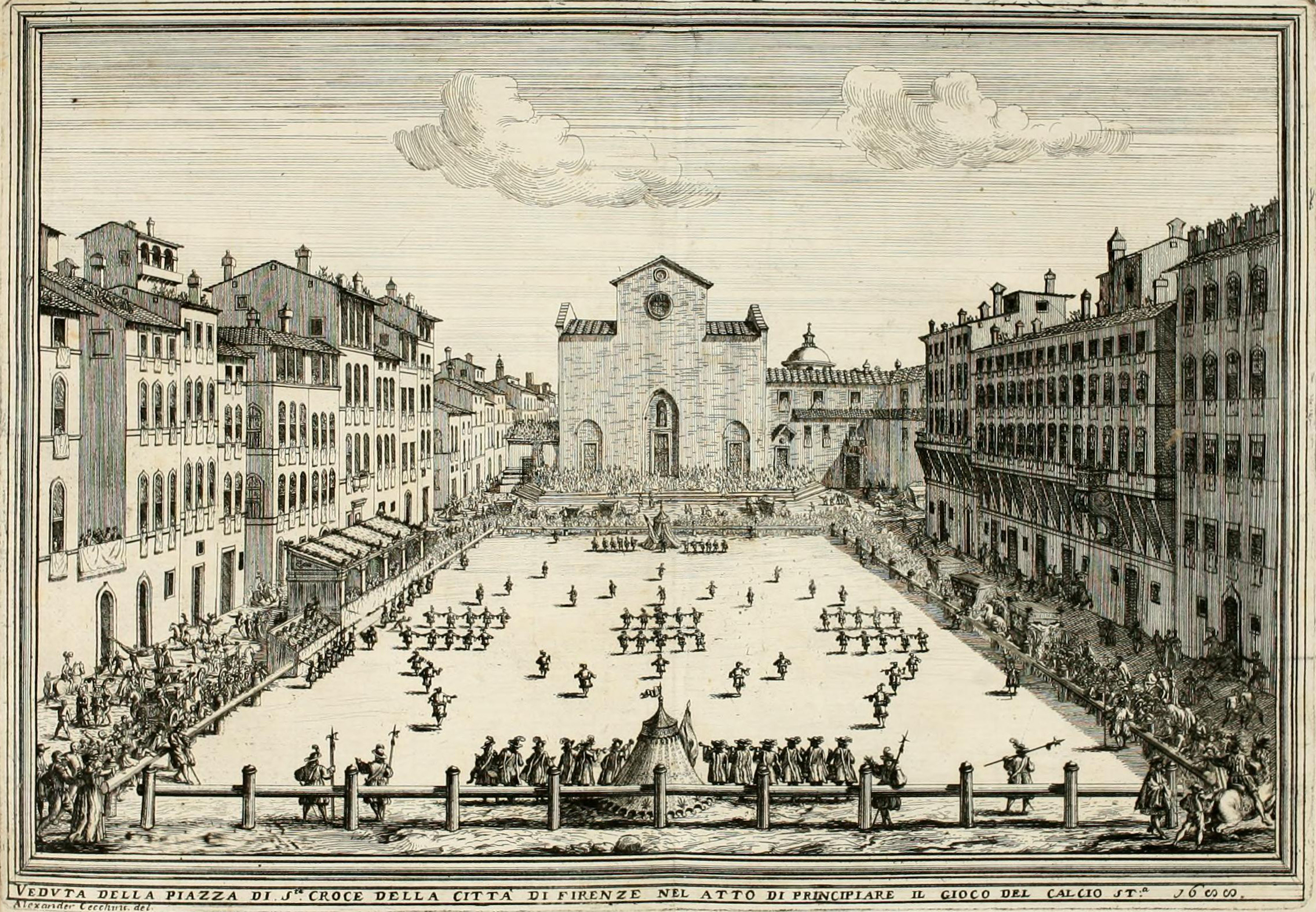
Calcio Fiorentino originated in 16th-century Italy.

Numerous attempts were made to ban football games, particularly the most rowdy and disruptive forms. This was especially the case in England, and in other parts of Europe, during the Middle Ages and early modern period. Between 1324 and 1667, in England alone, football was banned by more than 30 royal and local laws. The need to repeatedly proclaim such laws demonstrated the difficulty in enforcing bans on popular games. King Edward II was so troubled by the unruliness of football in London that, on April 13, 1314, he issued a proclamation banning it:

Forasmuch as there is great noise in the city caused by hustling over large balls from which many evils may arise which God forbid; we command and forbid, on behalf of the King, on pain of imprisonment, such game to be used in the city in the future.

In 1531, Sir Thomas Elyot wrote that:

in like wise foote balle, wherin is nothinge but beastly furie and exstreme violence.

These antiquated games went into sharp decline in the 19th century when the Highway Act 1835 was passed banning the playing of football on public highways. Antithetical to social change this anachronism of football continued to be played in some parts of the United Kingdom. These games still survive in a number of towns notably the Ba game played at Christmas and New Year at Kirkwall in the Orkney Islands Scotland, Uppies and Downies over Easter at Workington in Cumbria and the Royal Shrovetide Football Match on Shrove Tuesday and Ash Wednesday at Ashbourne in Derbyshire, England.

=== Football in America ===
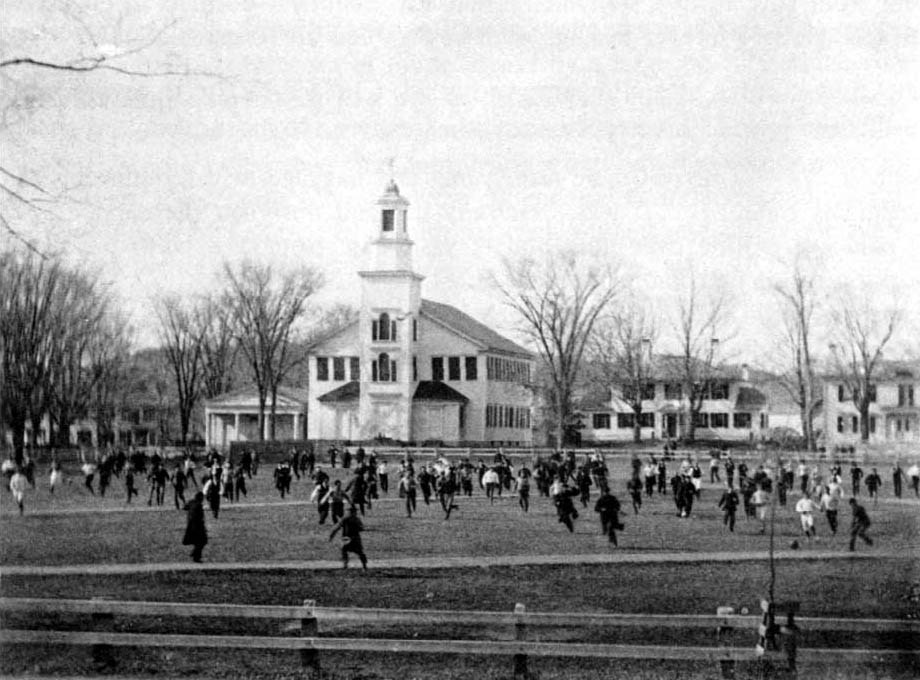
Old division football being played on the Green at Dartmouth College in 1874

In 1586, men from a ship commanded by an English explorer named John Davis, went ashore to play a form of football with Inuit (Eskimo) people in Greenland. There are later accounts of an Inuit game played on ice, called Aqsaqtuk. Each match began with two teams facing each other in parallel lines, before attempting to kick the ball through each other team's line and then at a goal. In 1610, William Strachey, an English colonist at Jamestown, Virginia recorded a game played by Native Americans, called Pahsaheman.

Although there are mentions of Native Americans playing games, modern American football has its origins in the traditional football games played in the cities, villages and schools of Europe for many centuries before America was settled by Europeans. Early games appear to have had much in common with the traditional "mob football" played in England. The games remained largely unorganized until the 19th century, when intramural games of football began to be played on college campuses. Each school played its own variety of football. Princeton University students played a game called "ballown" as early as 1820.

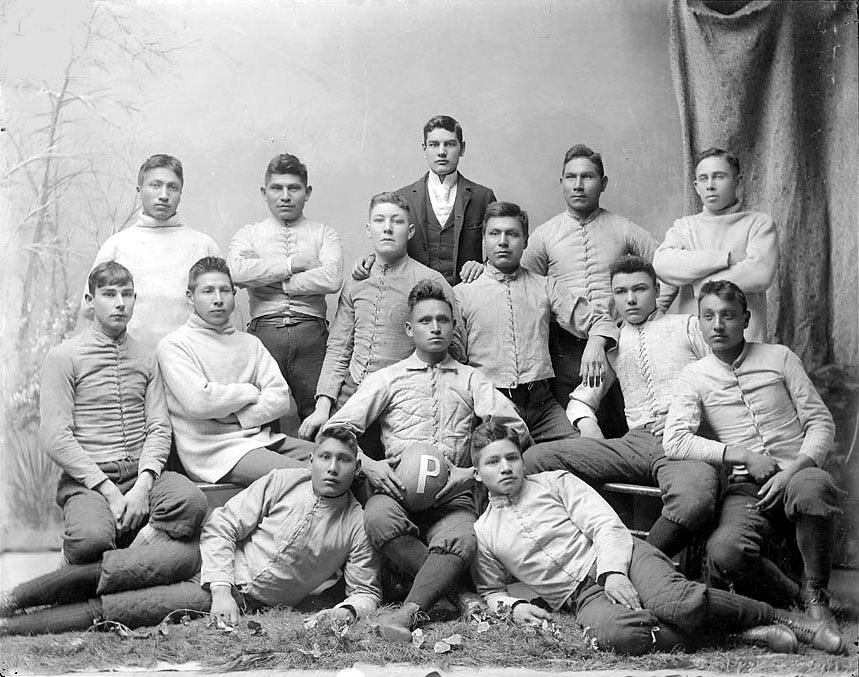
A Native American college football team of 1879

A Harvard tradition known as "Bloody Monday" began in 1827, which consisted of a mass ballgame between the freshman and sophomore classes. In 1860, both the town police and the college authorities agreed the Bloody Monday had to go. The Harvard students responded by going into mourning for a mock figure called "Football Fightum", for whom they conducted funeral rites. The authorities held firm and it was a dozen years before football was once again played at Harvard. Dartmouth played its own version called "Old division football", the rules of which were first published in 1871, though the game dates to as early as the 1830s.

All of these games, and others, shared certain commonalities. They remained largely "mob" style games, with huge numbers of players attempting to advance the ball into a goal area, often by any means necessary. Rules were simple, violence and injury were common. The violence of these mob-style games led to widespread protests and a decision to abandon them. Yale, under pressure from the city of New Haven, banned the play of all forms of football in 1860.

=== The "Boston game" ===
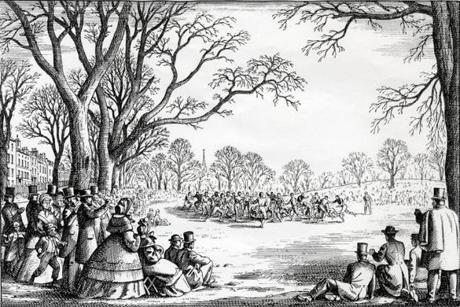
Artistic rendition of an Oneida FC game played at Boston Common

While the game was banned in colleges, it was becoming popular in numerous east coast prep schools. In the 1860s, manufactured inflatable balls were introduced through the innovations of shoemaker Richard Lindon. These were much more regular in shape than the handmade balls of earlier times, making kicking and carrying easier. Two general types of football had evolved by this time: "kicking" games (like the game played at Cambridge University) which later served as the basis for the rules of the Football Association (soccer) in 1863, and "running" (or "carrying") games, which later served as the basis for the laws laid down by the Rugby Football Union in 1871. A hybrid of the two, known as the "Boston game", was already played by a team called the Oneida Football Club. The club, considered by some historians as the first formal football club in the United States, was formed in 1862 by graduates of Boston's elite preparatory schools. They played mostly among themselves, though they organized a team of non-members to play a game in November 1863, which the Oneidas won easily. The game caught the attention of the press, and "the Boston game" continued to spread throughout the 1860s. Oneida, from 1862 to 1865, reportedly never lost a game or even gave up a single point.

== Early history of intercollegiate football (1869–1932) ==
The game began to return to college campuses by the late 1860s. Princeton, Rutgers University, and Brown University began playing the popular "kicking" game during this time. In 1867, Princeton used rules based on those of the London Football Association. A "running game", resembling rugby football, was taken up by the Montreal Football Club in Canada in 1868. Football games were brought back to Cornell, Columbia, Dartmouth, Harvard and Yale following an 1870 tour of these universities by Thomas Hughes, author of the popular and celebrated novel Tom Brown's Schooldays. During his visits, Hughes emphasized that football had to be regulated to promote physical culture rather than brutality. Hughes' defense of football likely resonated with returning Civil War veterans who were used to vigorous competition.

American football historian Parke H. Davis described the period between 1869 and 1875 as the 'Pioneer Period'; the years 1876–93 he called the 'Period of the American Intercollegiate Football Association'; and the years 1894–1933 he dubbed the 'Period of Rules Committees and Conferences'.

=== Pioneer period (1869–1875) ===
==== Rutgers–Princeton (1869) ====
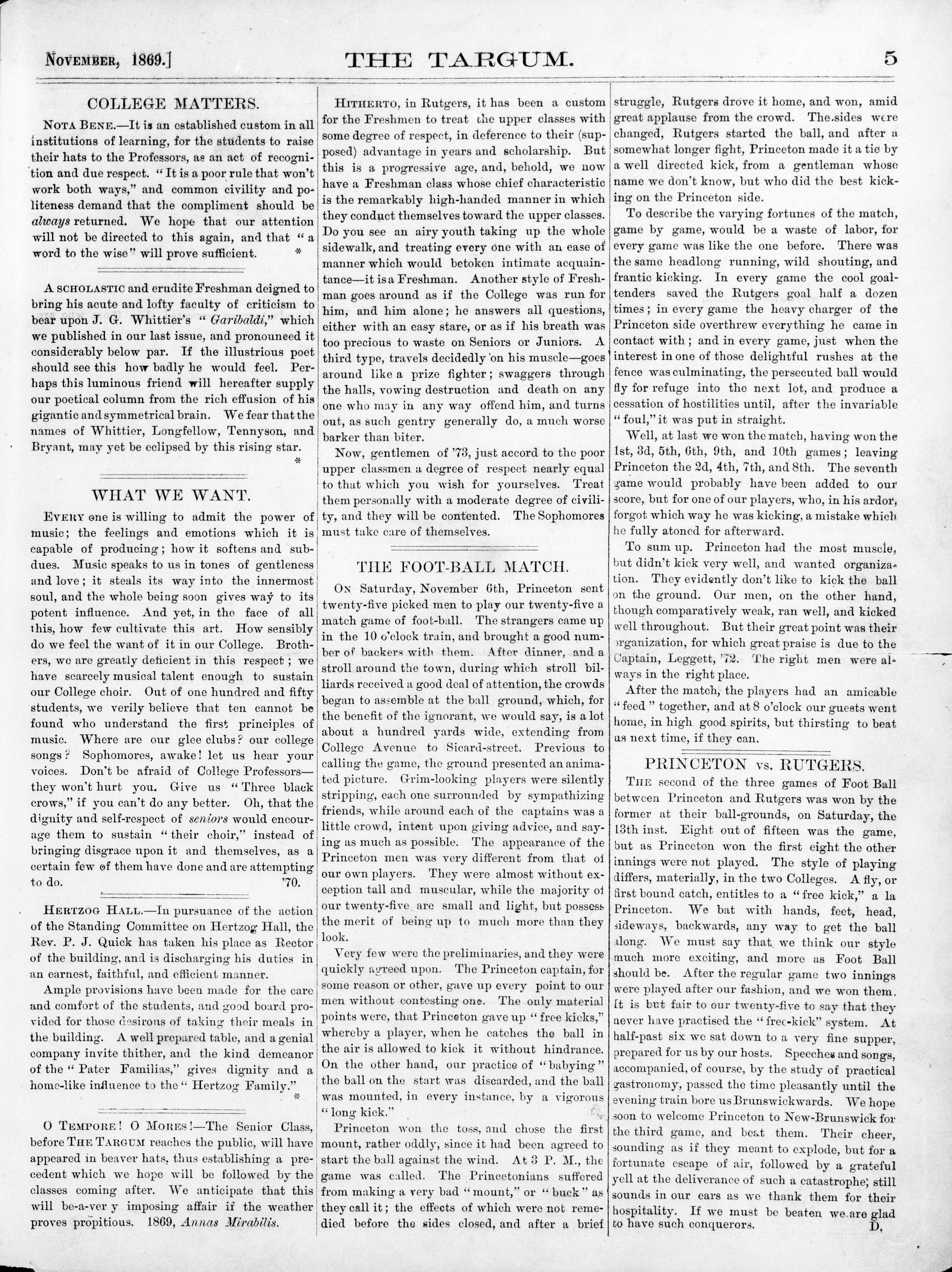
"The Foot-Ball Match", Chronicle of the first collegiate game between Rutgers and Princeton at The Targum, Nov 1869

On November 6, 1869, Rutgers University faced Princeton University (then known as the College of New Jersey) in a game that was played with a round ball and used a set of rules suggested by Rutgers captain William J. Leggett, based on London's The Football Association's first set of rules, which were an early attempt by the former pupils of England's public schools, to unify the rules of their public schools games and create a universal and standardized set of rules for the game of football and bore little resemblance to the American game which would be developed in the following decades. By tradition more than any other criteria, it is usually regarded as the first game of intercollegiate American football. Princeton Captain, William Stryker Gummere, conceived the idea of an intercollegiate game between Princeton and Rutgers. He invented a set of rules and convinced William J. Leggett to join him.

The game was played at a Rutgers field. Two teams of 25 players attempted to score by kicking the ball over the opposing team's goal. Throwing or carrying the ball was not allowed, but there was plenty of physical contact between players. The first team to reach six goals was declared the winner. Rutgers won by a score of six to four. A rematch was played at Princeton a week later under Princeton's own set of rules (one notable difference was the awarding of a "free kick" to any player that caught the ball on the fly, which was a feature adopted from the Football Association's rules; the fair catch kick rule has survived through to modern American game). Princeton won that game by a score of 8–0. Columbia joined the series in 1870, and by 1872 several schools were fielding intercollegiate teams, including Yale and Stevens Institute of Technology.

==== Early efforts to organize the game ====
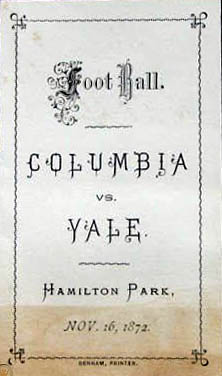
Program for the first Columbia v Yale game, 1872

Columbia University was the third school to field a team. The Lions traveled from New York City to New Brunswick on November 12, 1870, and were defeated by Rutgers 6 to 3. Teams fielded 20 men per side, included two goalkeepers each. The game suffered from disorganization and the players kicked and battled each other as much as the ball.

Later in 1870, Princeton and Rutgers played again with Princeton defeating Rutgers 6–0. This game's violence caused such an outcry that no games at all were played in 1871. Football came back in 1872, when Columbia played Yale for the first time. The Yale team was coached and captained by David Schley Schaff, who had learned to play football while attending Rugby school. Schaff himself was injured and unable to play the game, but Yale won the game 3–0 nonetheless. Later in 1872, Stevens Tech became the fifth school to field a team. Stevens lost to Columbia, but beat both New York University and City College of New York during the following year.

By 1873, the college students playing football had made significant efforts to standardize their fledgling game. Teams had been scaled down from 25 players to 20. The only way to score was still to bat or kick the ball through the opposing team's goal, and the game was played in two 45 minute halves on fields 140 yards long and 70 yards wide. On October 20, 1873, representatives from Yale, Princeton, and Rutgers met at the Fifth Avenue Hotel in New York City to codify the first set of intercollegiate football rules. Before this meeting, which founded the first Intercollegiate Football Association, each school had its own set of rules and games were usually played using the home team's own particular code. At this meeting a list of rules, based more on The Football Association's rules than the recently founded Rugby Football Union, was drawn up for intercollegiate football games.

==== Harvard–McGill (1874) ====
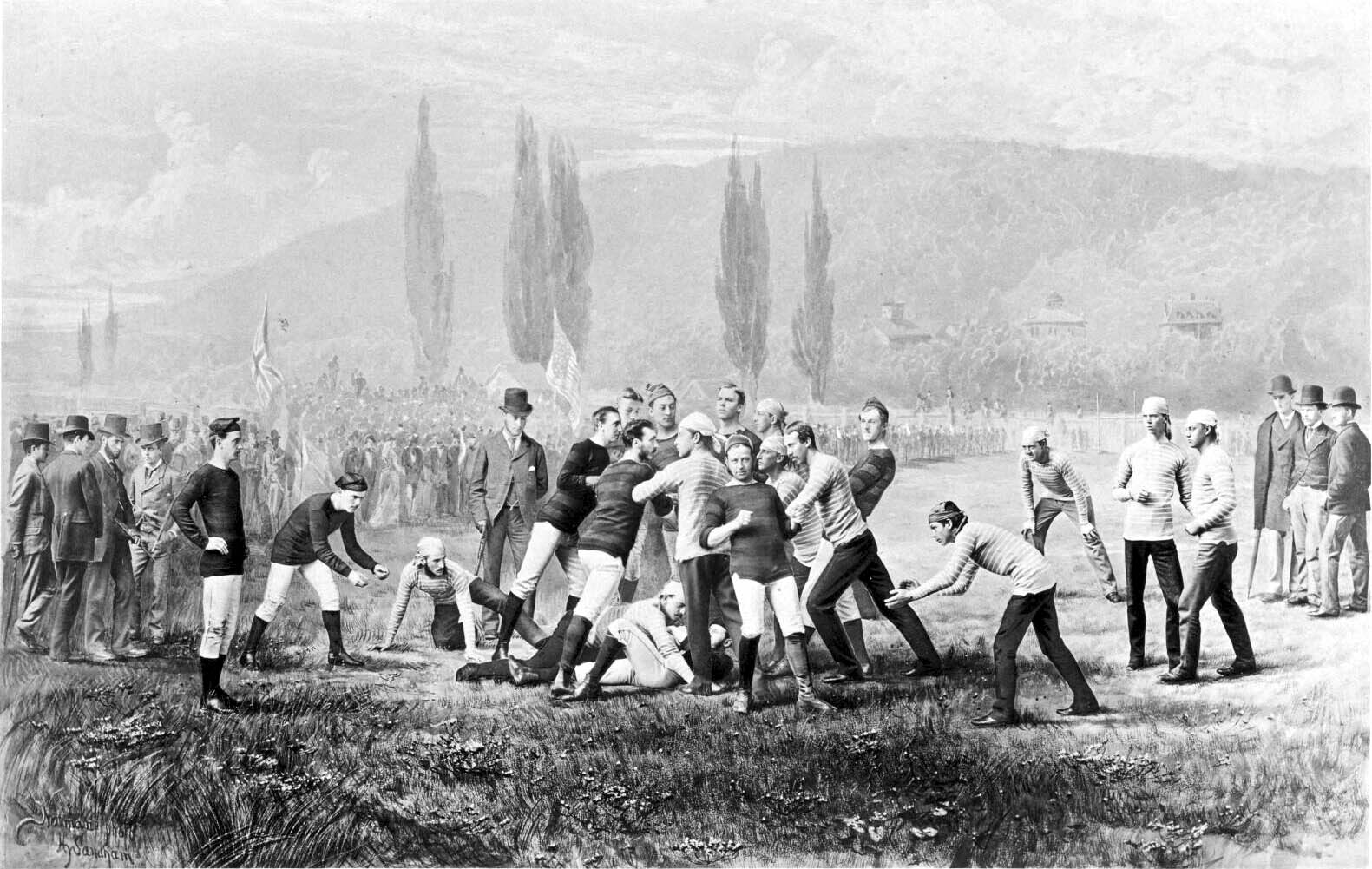
The Harvard vs. McGill game played in 1874

Harvard Crimson football had resumed in 1872, but their intramural rules were derived from the "Boston game" version of football which allowed carrying, albeit only when the player carrying the ball was being pursued. The 1873 rules conference had put other schools on a path towards association football (i.e., soccer), but Harvard refused to attend the conference, as their players had a distaste for attacking the ball with feet and shins. Harvard's refusal made the tentative agreement untenable. Harvard was the most well-connected and influential of the elite universities, and it had a tradition of alumni philanthropy and an unrivaled school spirit. For the greater purpose of building intercollegiate networks through sport, Harvard's approval was sought by the other colleges.

In 1874, Harvard agreed to a challenge to play McGill University, from Montreal, in a two-game series. Inasmuch as rugby football had been transplanted to Canada from England, the McGill team played under a set of rules which allowed a player to pick up the ball and run with it whenever he wished. Another rule, unique to McGill, was to count tries (the act of grounding the football past the opposing team's goal line; there was no end zone during this time), as well as goals, in the scoring. In the Rugby rules of the time, a touchdown only provided the chance to kick a free goal from the field. If the kick was missed, the touchdown did not count.

The McGill team traveled to Cambridge to meet Harvard. On May 14, 1874, the first game, played under Harvard's rules, was won by Harvard with a score of 3–0. The next day, the two teams played under "McGill" rugby rules to a scoreless tie. The games featured a round ball instead of a rugby-style oblong ball. This series of games represents an important milestone in the development of the modern game of American football. In October 1874, the Harvard team once again traveled to Montreal to play McGill in rugby, where they won by three tries.

==== Harvard–Tufts, Harvard–Yale (1875) ====
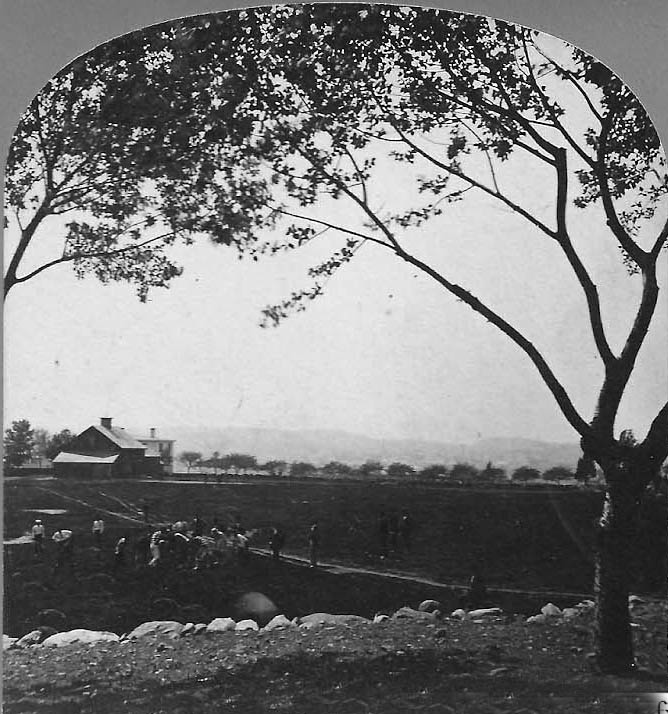
The second Tufts v Harvard game was played at College Hill in October 1875

Harvard quickly took a liking to the rugby game, and its use of the try which, until that time, was not used in American football. The try would later evolve into the score known as the touchdown. On June 4, 1875, Harvard faced Tufts University in the first game between two American colleges played under rules similar to the McGill–Harvard contest, which was won by Tufts. The rules included each side fielding 11 men, the ball was advanced by kicking or carrying it, and tackles of the ball carrier stopped play.

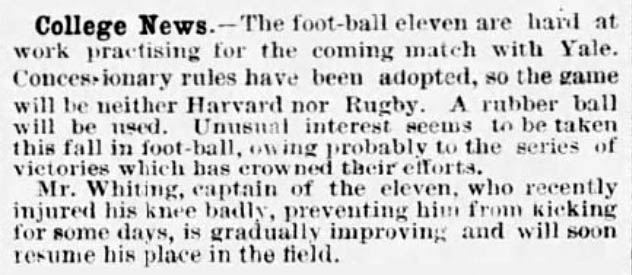
News about the Harvard v Yale game played under the "concessionary rules" in 1875

Further elated by the excitement of McGill's version of football, Harvard challenged its closest rival, Yale, to a game which the Bulldogs accepted. The two teams agreed to play under a set of rules called the "Concessionary Rules", which involved Harvard conceding something to Yale's soccer and Yale conceding a great deal to Harvard's rugby. They decided to play with 15 players on each team. On November 13, 1875, Yale and Harvard played each other for the first time ever, where Harvard won 4–0. 2,000 spectators watched the first playing of The Game—the annual football contest between Harvard and Yale—including the future "father of American football" Walter Camp. Camp, who would enroll at Yale the next year, was torn between an admiration for Harvard's style of play and the misery of the Yale defeat, and became determined to avenge Yale's defeat. Spectators from Princeton also carried the game back home, where it quickly became the most popular version of football.

=== Period of the American Intercollegiate Football Association (1876–1893) ===
==== Massasoit Convention (1876) ====
On November 23, 1876, representatives from Harvard, Yale, Princeton, and Columbia met at the Massasoit House hotel in Springfield, Massachusetts to standardize a new code of rules based on the rugby game first introduced to Harvard by McGill University in 1874. The rules were based largely on the Rugby Football Union's code from England, though one important difference was the replacement of a kicked goal with a touchdown as the primary means of scoring (a change that would later occur in rugby itself, favoring the try as the main scoring event). Three of the schools—Harvard, Columbia, and Princeton—formed the second Intercollegiate Football Association as a result of the meeting. Yale did not join the group until 1879, because of an early disagreement about the number of players per team. The Intercollegiate Football Association represents the first comprehensive effort to organize and standardize American football.

==== Walter Camp: Father of American football ====
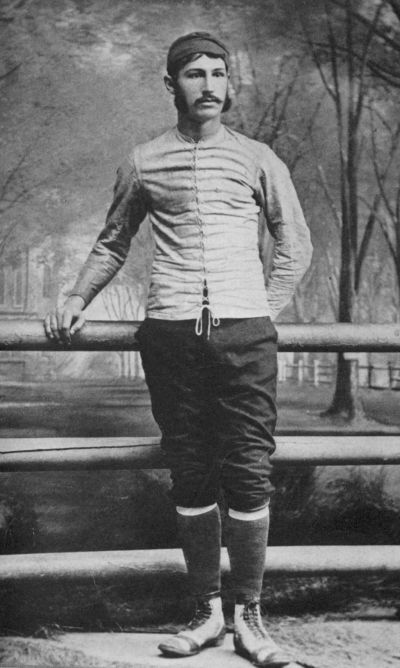
Walter Camp, the "Father of American Football", pictured here in 1878 as the captain of the Yale University football team

Walter Camp is widely considered to be the most important figure in the development of American football. As a youth, he excelled in sports like track, baseball, and association football, and after enrolling at Yale in 1876, he earned varsity honors in every sport the school offered.

Following the introduction of rugby-style rules to American football, Camp became a fixture at the Massasoit House conventions where rules were debated and changed. Dissatisfied with what seemed to him to be a disorganized mob, he proposed his first rule change at the first meeting he attended in 1878: a reduction from fifteen players to eleven. The motion was rejected at that time but passed in 1880. The effect was to open up the game and emphasize speed over strength. Camp's most famous change, the establishment of the line of scrimmage and the snap from center to quarterback, was also passed in 1880. Originally, the snap was executed with the foot of the center. As renowned Yale center Pa Corbin described: "By standing the ball on end and exercising a certain pressure on the same, it was possible to have it bound into the quarterback's hands." Later changes made it possible to snap the ball with the hands, either through the air or by a direct hand-to-hand pass. Rugby league followed Camp's example, and in 1906 introduced the play-the-ball rule, which greatly resembled Camp's early scrimmage and center-snap rules. In 1966, Rugby league introduced a four-tackle rule based on Camp's early down-and-distance rules.

The 1880 season also saw the first year of 11 players to a team. From 1869 to 1873, one saw 25 players to a side. From 1873 to 1875, one saw 20 players per side. 1876 to 1879 saw 15 players per side.

Camp's new scrimmage rules revolutionized the game, though not always as intended. Princeton, in particular, used scrimmage play to slow the game, making incremental progress towards the end zone during each down. Rather than increase scoring, which had been Camp's original intent, the rule was exploited to maintain control of the ball for the entire game, resulting in slow, unexciting contests. At the 1882 rules meeting, Camp proposed that a team be required to advance the ball a minimum of five yards within three downs. These down-and-distance rules, combined with the establishment of the line of scrimmage, transformed the game from a variation of rugby football into the distinct sport of American football.

Camp was central to several more significant rule changes that came to define American football. In 1881, the field was reduced in size to its modern dimensions of 120 by 53 1/3 yards (109.7 by 48.8 meters). Several times in 1883, Camp tinkered with the scoring rules, finally arriving at four points for a touchdown, two points for kicks after touchdowns, two points for safeties, and five for field goals. Camp's innovations in the area of point scoring influenced rugby union's move to point scoring in 1890. In 1887, game time was set at two halves of 45 minutes each. Also in 1887, two paid officials—a referee and an umpire—were mandated for each game. A year later, the rules were changed to allow tackling below the waist, and in 1889, the officials were given whistles and stopwatches.

After his playing career at Yale ended in 1882, Camp was employed by the New Haven Clock Company until his death in 1925. Though no longer a player, he remained a fixture at annual rules meetings for most of his life, and he personally selected an annual All-American team every year from 1889 through 1924. The Walter Camp Football Foundation continues to select All-American teams in his honor.

==== Interference ====
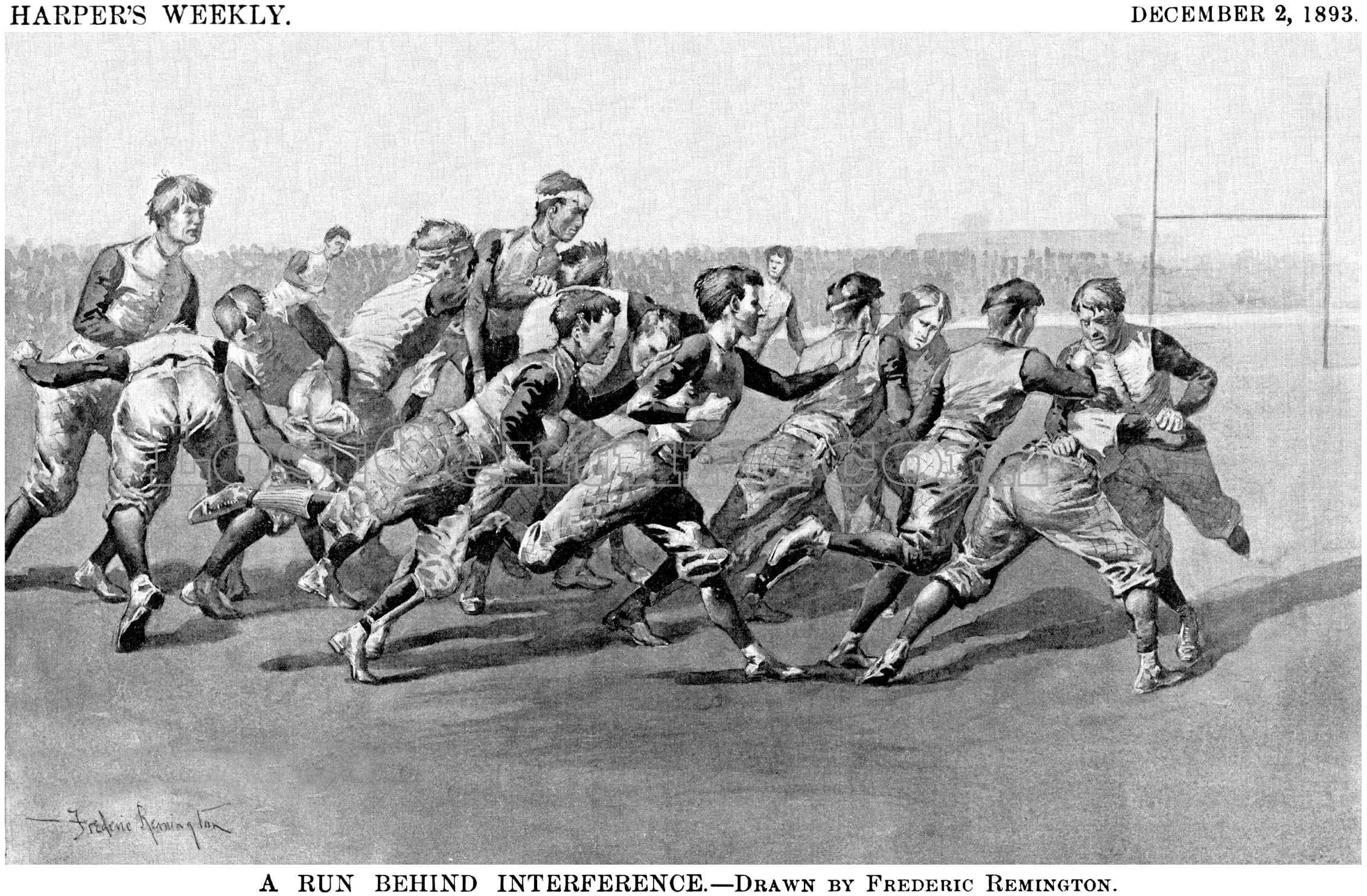
Behind Interference, by Frederic Remington (1893).

The last, and arguably most important innovation, which would at last make American football uniquely "American", was the legalization of interference, or blocking, a tactic which was highly illegal under the rugby-style rules. Interference remains strictly illegal in both rugby codes to today. The prohibition of interference in the rugby game stems from the game's strict enforcement of its offside rule, which prohibited any player on the team with possession of the ball to loiter between the ball and the goal. At first, American players would find creative ways of aiding the runner by pretending to accidentally knock into defenders trying to tackle the runner. When Walter Camp witnessed this tactic being employed during a game he refereed between Harvard and Princeton in 1879, he was at first appalled, but the next year had adopted the blocking tactics for his own team at Yale.

During the 1880s and 1890s, teams developed increasingly complex blocking tactics including the interlocking interference technique known as the Flying wedge or "V-trick formation", which was first employed by Richard Hodge at Princeton in 1884 in a game against Penn, however, Princeton put the tactic aside for the next 4 years, only to revive it again in 1888 to combat the three-time All-American Yale guard Pudge Heffelfinger.

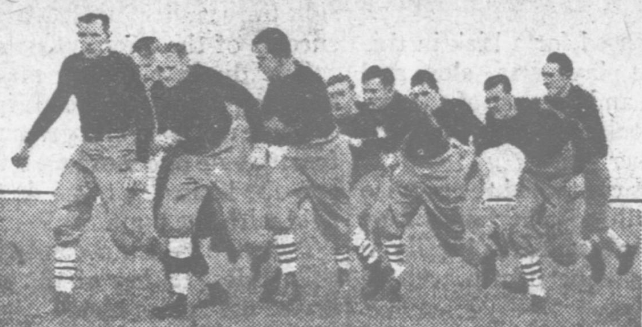
Players demonstrate Deland's "flying wedge" in 1912.

Heffelfinger soon figured out how to break up the formation by leaping high in the air with his legs tucked under him, striking the V like a human cannonball. In 1892, during a game against Yale, a Harvard fan and student Lorin F. Deland first introduced the flying wedge as a kickoff play, in which two five man squads would line up about 25 yards behind the kicker, only to converge in a perfect flying wedge running downfield, where Harvard was able to trap the ball and hand it off to the speedy All-American Charley Brewer inside the wedge.

Despite their effectiveness, the flying wedge, "V-trick formation" and other tactics which involved interlocking interference, were outlawed in 1905 through the efforts of the rule committee led by Parke H. Davis, because of its contribution to serious injury. Non-interlocking interference remains a basic element of modern American football, with many complex schemes being developed and implemented over the years, including zone blocking and pass blocking.

==== Alex Moffat ====
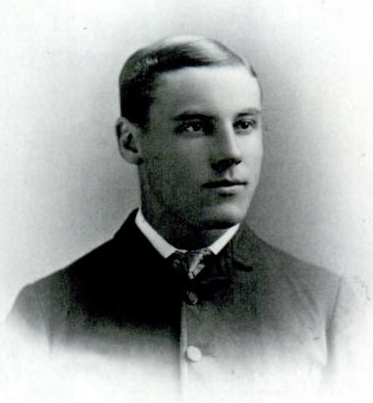
Alex Moffat

Alex Moffat was the early sport's greatest kicker and held a place in Princeton athletic history similar to Camp at Yale. American football historian David M. Nelson credits Moffat with revolutionizing the kicking game in 1883 by developing the "spiral punt", described by Nelson as "a dramatic change from the traditional end-over-end kicks". He also invented the drop kick.

==== Henry "Tillie" Lamar ====
The 1885 season was notable for one of the most celebrated football plays of the 19th century – a 90-yard punt return by Henry "Tillie" Lamar of Princeton in the closing minutes of the game against Yale. Trailing 5–0, Princeton dropped two men back to receive a Yale punt. The punt glanced off one returner's shoulder and was caught by the other, Lamar, on the dead run. Lamar streaked down the left sideline, until hemmed in by two Princeton players, then cut sharply to the middle of the field, ducking under their arms and breaking loose for the touchdown. After the controversy of a darkness-shortened Yale-Princeton championship game the year before that was ruled "no contest", a record crowd turned out for the 1885 game. For the first time, the game was played on one of the campuses instead of at a neutral site, and emerged as a major social event, attracting ladies to its audience as well as students and male spectators. The Lamar punt return furnished the most spectacular ending to any football game played to that point, and did much to popularize the sport of college football to the general public. One source lists Princeton captain C. M. DeCamp as the player of the year.

==== Arthur Cumnock ====
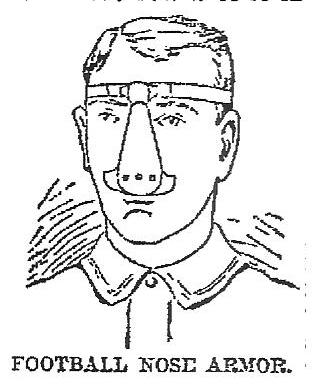
Nose armor.

Harvard end Arthur Cumnock invented the first nose guard. Cumnock's invention gained popularity, and in 1892, a newspaper article described the growing popularity of the device:

By the invention of nose armor football players who have been hitherto barred from the field because of broken or weak noses are now able to thrust an armor protected nose (even though it be broken) into the center of the roughest scrimmage without danger to the sensitive nasal organ. The armor is made of fine rubber and protects both the nose and teeth.

He is also credited with having been the person who developed the tradition of spring practice in football; in March 1889, Cumnock led the Harvard team in drills on Jarvis field, which is considered the first-ever spring football practice. In 1913, an article in an Eastern newspaper sought to choose the greatest Harvard football player of all time. The individual chosen was Cumnock, who "the sons of John Harvard are pretty well agreed" was "the greatest Harvard player of all time." As for his individual performance in the 1890 Yale game, the writer noted: "Such tackling as Cumnock did that day probably has never been equaled. He played a star offensive game, but on the defensive he was a terror. Lee McClung would come around the end with the giant Heffelfinger interfering, and the records read: 'Cumnock tackles both and brings them down.'"

==== Scoring table ====
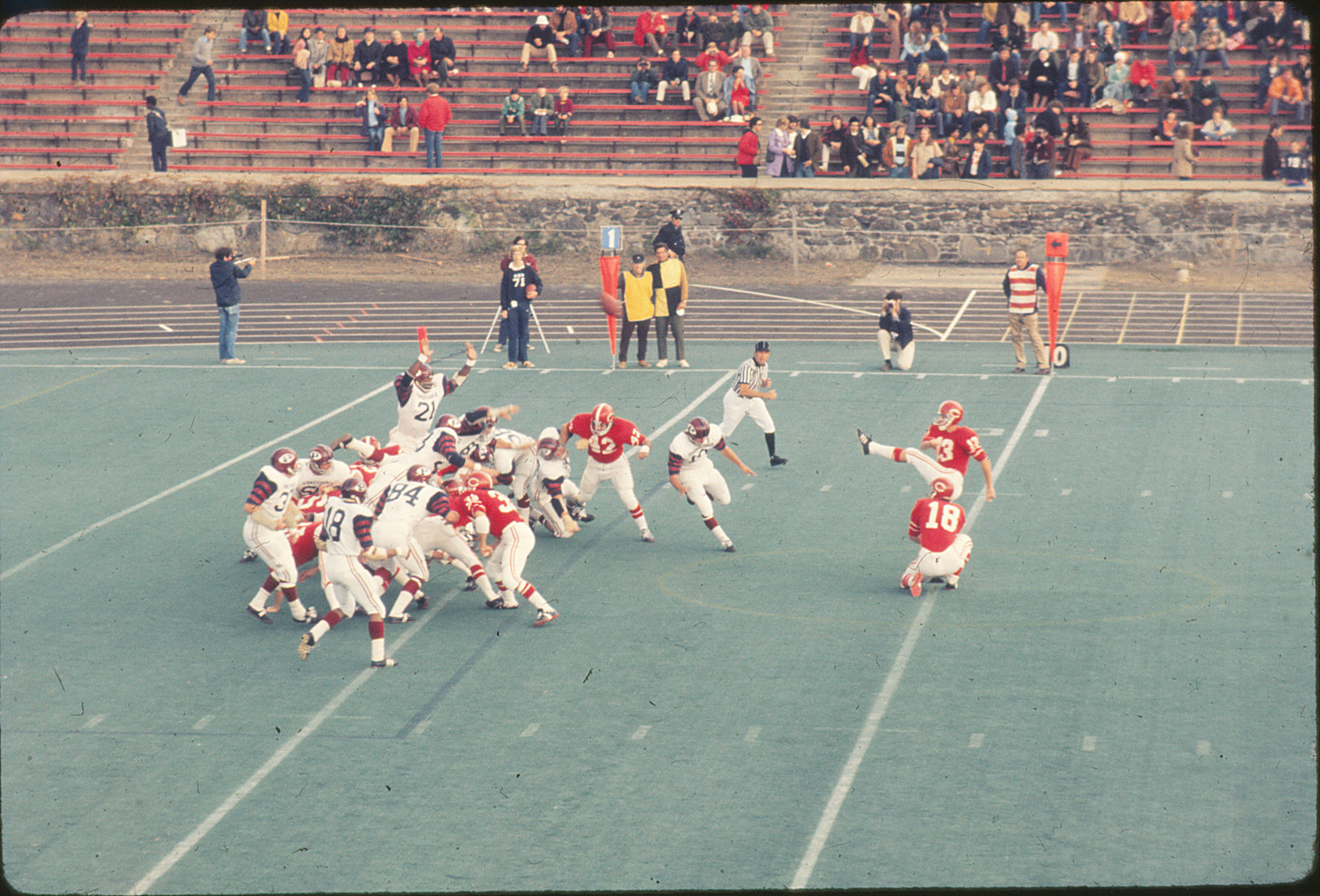
The 1972 Cornell Big Red football team executing a conversion kick ("extra point")

Historical college football scoring
Era	Touchdown	Field goal	Conversion				Safety
Era	Touchdown	Field goal	Kick	Rush/pass	Conversion safety	Defensive return	Safety
1883	2	5	4	–	–	–	1
1883–1897	4	5	2	–	–	–	2
1898–1903	5	5	1	–	–	–	2
1904–1908	5	4	1	–	–	–	2
1909–1911	5	3	1	–	–	–	2
1912–1921	6	3	1	–	–	–	2
1922–1957	6	3	1	1	–	–	2
1958–present	6	3	1	2	1	2	2

Note: For brief periods in the late 19th century, some penalties awarded one or more points for the opposing teams, and some teams in the late 19th and early 20th centuries chose to negotiate their own scoring system for individual games.

=== Period of Rules Committees and Conference (1894–1932) ===
==== Expansion (1894–1904) ====
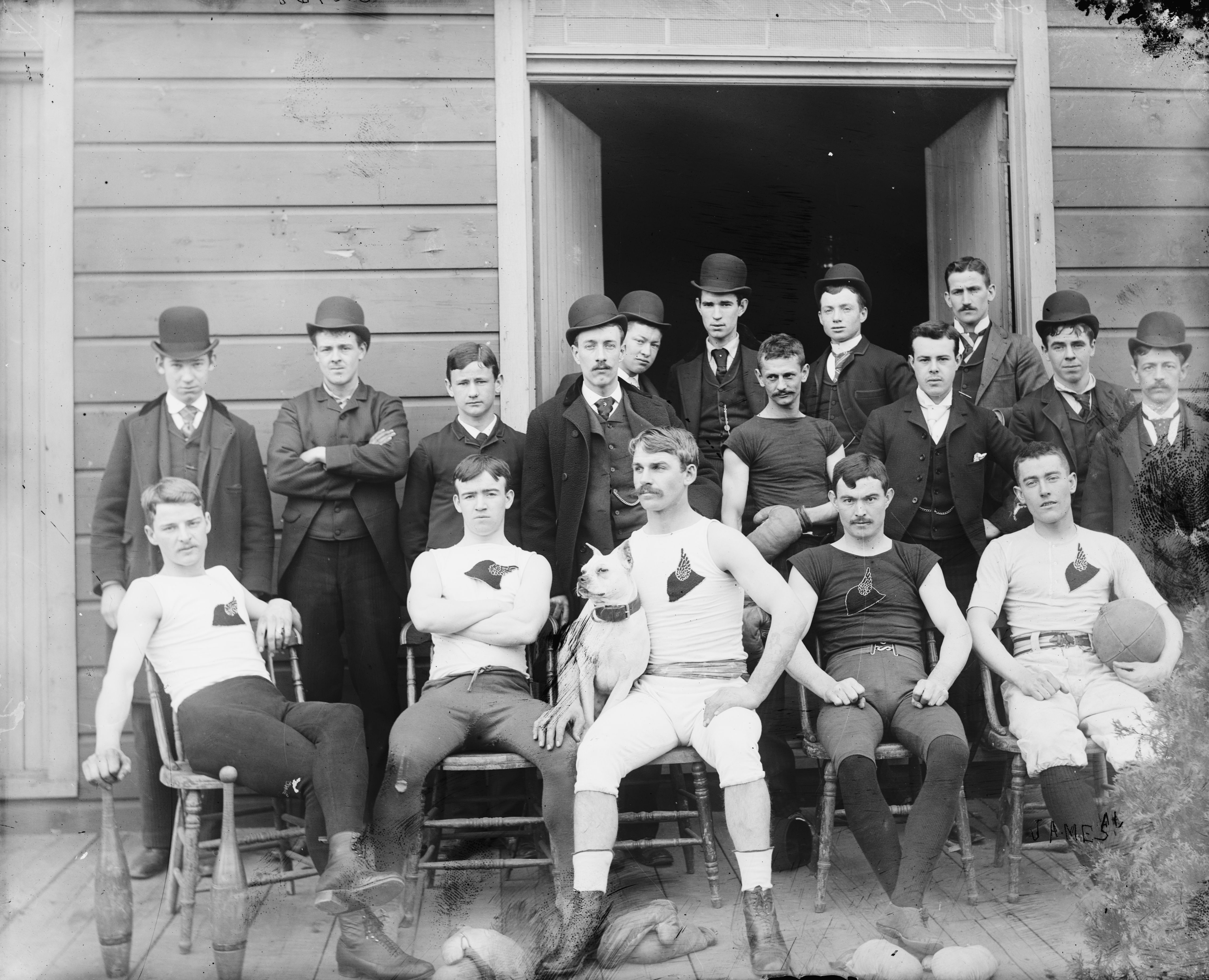
An early American football team, from the turn of the 20th century

College football expanded greatly during the last two decades of the 19th century. Several major rivalries date from this time period; examples include Michigan–Notre Dame (1887), Army–Navy (1890), California–Stanford (1892), and Oklahoma–Texas (1900).

November 1890 was an active time in the sport. In Baldwin City, Kansas, on the 22nd, college football was played in the state for the first time as Baker beat Kansas, 22–9. On the 27th, Vanderbilt played Nashville (Peabody) at Athletic Park and won 40–0. It was the first time organized football was played in the state of Tennessee. The 29th saw the first instance of the above noted Army–Navy Game, a 24–0 win by Navy.

===== East =====
Rutgers was first to extend the reach of the game. An intercollegiate game was first played in the state of New York when Rutgers played Columbia on November 2, 1872. It was also the first scoreless tie in the history of the fledgling sport. Yale football started the same year and had its first match against Columbia, the nearest college to play football. It took place at Hamilton Park in New Haven and was the first game in New England. The game used a set of rules based on association football with 20-man sides, played on a field 400 by 250 feet. Yale won 3–0, Tommy Sherman scoring the first goal and Lew Irwin the other two.

After the first game against Harvard, Tufts took its squad to Bates College in Lewiston, Maine for the first football game played in Maine. This occurred on November 6, 1875.

Penn's Athletic Association was looking to pick "a twenty" to play a game of football against Columbia. This "twenty" never played Columbia, but did play twice against Princeton. Princeton won both games 6 to 0. The first of these happened on November 11, 1876, in Philadelphia and was the first intercollegiate game in the state of Pennsylvania.

Brown enters the intercollegiate game in 1878.

The first game where one team scored over 100 points happened on October 25, 1884, when Yale routed Dartmouth 113–0. It was also the first time one team scored over 100 points and the opposing team was shut out. The next week, Princeton outscored Lafayette by 140 to 0.

The first intercollegiate game in the state of Vermont happened on November 6, 1886, between Dartmouth and Vermont at Burlington, Vermont. Dartmouth won 91 to 0.

The first nighttime football game was played in Mansfield, Pennsylvania on September 28, 1892, between Mansfield State Normal and Wyoming Seminary and ended at halftime in a 0–0 tie. The Army-Navy game of 1893 saw the first documented use of a football helmet by a player in a game. Joseph M. Reeves had a crude leather helmet made by a shoemaker in Annapolis and wore it in the game after being warned by his doctor that he risked death if he continued to play football after suffering an earlier kick to the head.

Harvard Law School student and football center William H. Lewis became the first African-American to be selected as an All-American in 1892, an honor he would receive again in 1893.

===== Midwest =====
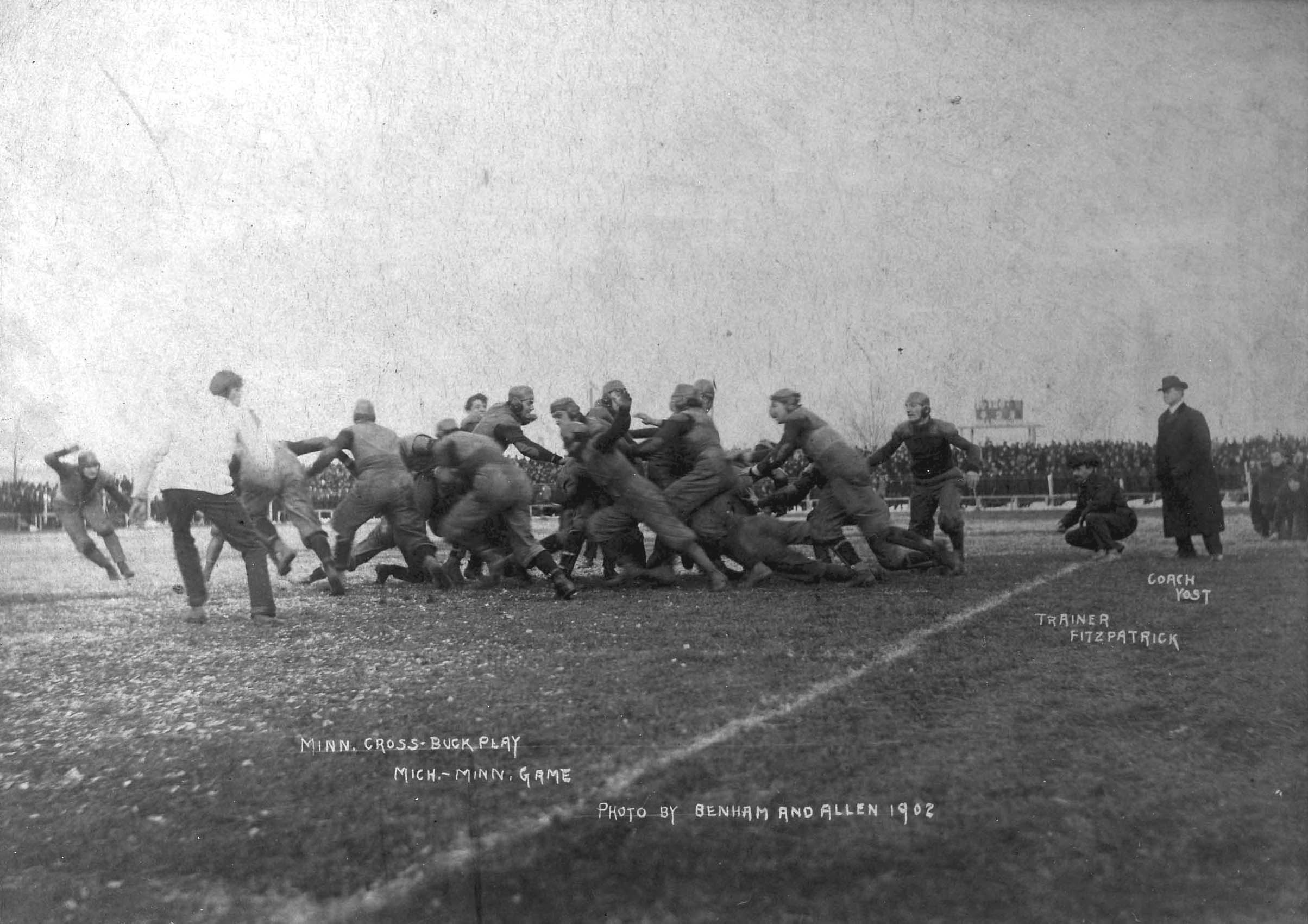
1902 football game between the University of Minnesota and the University of Michigan

In 1879, the University of Michigan became the first school west of Pennsylvania to establish a college football team. On May 30, 1879, Michigan beat Racine College 1–0 in a game played in Chicago. The Chicago Daily Tribune called it "the first rugby-football game to be played west of the Alleghenies." Other Midwestern schools soon followed suit, including the University of Chicago, Northwestern University, and the University of Minnesota. In 1881, Michigan scheduled games against the top American football teams—the Eastern powerhouses of Harvard, Yale and Princeton.

Organized intercollegiate football was first played in the state of Minnesota on September 30, 1882, when Hamline was convinced to play Minnesota after a track meet. Minnesota won 2 to 0. It was the first game west of the Mississippi River. The first western team to travel east was the 1881 Michigan team, which played at Harvard, Yale and Princeton.

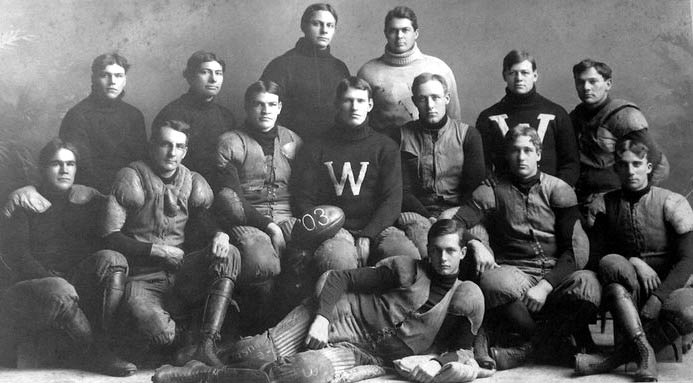
University of Wisconsin football team, 1903

Organized intercollegiate football was first played in Indiana on May 13, 1884, when Butler defeated DePauw.

Michigan's 1894 victory over Cornell marked the first victory by a Western football school against one of the Eastern football powers. Up to that point, no Western player had been selected for the annual College Football All-America Teams selected by Eastern football authorities. Michigan lobbied for Fatty Smith as an All-American. The nation's first college football league, the Intercollegiate Conference of Faculty Representatives (also known as the Western Conference), a precursor to the Big Ten Conference, was founded in 1895.

Led by coach Fielding H. Yost, Michigan became the first "western" national power. From 1901 to 1905, Michigan had a 56-game undefeated streak that included a 1902 trip to play in the first college football bowl game, which later became the Rose Bowl Game. During this streak, Michigan scored 2,831 points while allowing only 40. Stars on the team included Willie Heston and Al Herrnstein.

November 30, 1905, saw Walter Eckersall and Chicago defeat Michigan 2 to 0. Dubbed "The First Greatest Game of the Century", broke Michigan's 56-game unbeaten streak and marked the end of the "Point-a-Minute" years. Eckersall was selected as the quarterback for Walter Camp's "All-Time All-America Team" honoring the greatest college football players during the sport's formative years. After his playing days, Eckersall remained a prominent figure in football. He had a successful dual career as a sportswriter for the Chicago Tribune, and as a referee. As an official, Eckersall was considered one of the best and officiated at many high-profile games.

===== South =====
====== South Atlantic ======
Organized intercollegiate football was first played in the state of Virginia and the south on November 2, 1873, in Lexington between Washington and Lee and VMI. Washington and Lee won 4–2. Some industrious students of the two schools organized a game for October 23, 1869 – but it was rained out. Students of the University of Virginia were playing pickup games of the kicking-style of football as early as 1870, and some accounts even claim it organized a game against Washington and Lee College in 1871; but no record has been found of the score of this contest. Due to scantness of records of the prior matches some will claim Virginia v. Pantops Academy November 13, 1887, as the first game in Virginia.

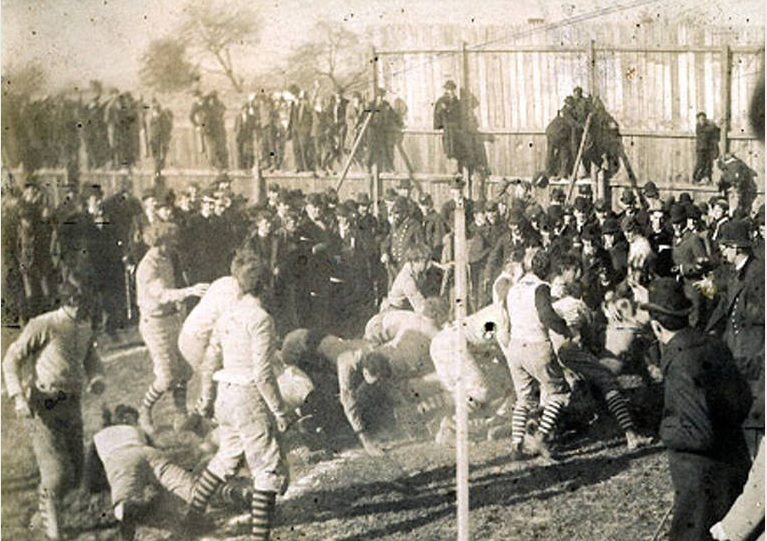
An 1894 football game in Staunton, Virginia between VMI and Virginia Tech.

On April 9, 1880, at Stoll Field, Transylvania University (then called Kentucky University) beat Centre College by the score of 13 3/4–0 in what is often considered the first recorded game played in the South. The first game of "scientific football" in the South was the first instance of the Victory Bell rivalry between North Carolina and Duke (then known as Trinity College) held on Thanksgiving Day, 1888, at the North Carolina State Fairgrounds in Raleigh, North Carolina.

On November 30, 1882, cadet Vaulx Carter organized a game between the Naval Academy and the Clifton Athletic Club (in fact Johns Hopkins University) and won 8–0, the first intercollegiate game in Maryland. It snowed heavily before the game, to the point where players for both teams had to clear layers of snow off of the field, making large piles of snow along the sides of the playing ground. Both teams also nailed strips of leather to the bottom of their shoes to help deal with slipping. The field was 110 yards by 53 yards, with goalposts 25 feet (7.6 m) apart and 20 feet (6.1 m) high. During play, the ball was kicked over the seawall a number of times, once going so far out it had to be retrieved by boat before play could continue. The following season, Gallaudet college and Georgetown played twice; the first intercollegiate games in Washington, D. C. The deaf-mute Gallaudet players sewed their own uniforms, made of heavy canvas with black and white stripes.

On November 13, 1887, the Virginia Cavaliers and Pantops Academy fought to a scoreless tie in the first organized football game in the state of Virginia. Students at UVA were playing pickup games of the kicking-style of football as early as 1870, and some accounts even claim that some industrious ones organized a game against Washington and Lee College in 1871, just two years after Rutgers and Princeton's historic first game in 1869. But no record has been found of the score of this contest. Washington and Lee also claims a 4 to 2 win over VMI in 1873. The 1889 Virginia Cavaliers are the first to claim a mythical southern championship.

On October 18, 1888, the Wake Forest Demon Deacons defeated the North Carolina Tar Heels 6 to 4 in the first intercollegiate game in the state of North Carolina. The first "scientific game" in the state occurred on Thanksgiving of the same year when North Carolina played Duke (then Trinity). Duke won 16 to 0. Princeton star Hector Cowan traveled south and trained the Tar Heels.

The 116–0 drubbing of Virginia by Princeton in 1890 signaled football's arrival in the south.

On September 27, 1902, Georgetown beat Navy 4 to 0. It is claimed by Georgetown authorities as the game with the first ever "roving center" or linebacker when Percy Given stood up, in contrast to the usual tale of Germany Schulz. The first linebacker in the South is often considered to be Sewanee's Frank Juhan.

====== Deep South ======
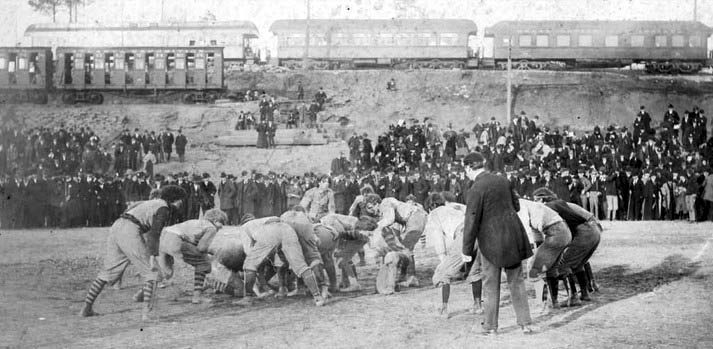
1895 football game between Auburn and Georgia.

On December 14, 1889, Wofford defeated Furman 5 to 1 in the first intercollegiate game in the state of South Carolina. The game featured no uniforms, no positions, and the rules were formulated before the game. 1896 saw the first instance of the "Big Thursday" Clemson–South Carolina rivalry in Columbia, another seminal moment in football below the South Atlantic States.

January 30, 1892, saw the first football game played in the state of Georgia when the Georgia Bulldogs defeated Mercer 50–0 at Herty Field. The 1892 Vanderbilt Commodores were the first team in the memory of Grantland Rice. Rice recalled Phil Connell then would be a good player in any era.

The beginnings of the contemporary Southeastern Conference and Atlantic Coast Conference start with the founding of the Southern Intercollegiate Athletic Association. The SIAA was founded on December 21, 1894, by Dr. William Dudley, a chemistry professor at Vanderbilt. The original members were Alabama, Auburn, Georgia, Georgia Tech, North Carolina, Sewanee, and Vanderbilt. Clemson, Cumberland, Kentucky, LSU, Mercer, Mississippi, Mississippi A&M (Mississippi State), Southwestern Presbyterian University, Tennessee, Texas, Tulane, and the University of Nashville joined the following year in 1895 as invited charter members. The conference was originally formed for "the development and purification of college athletics throughout the South".

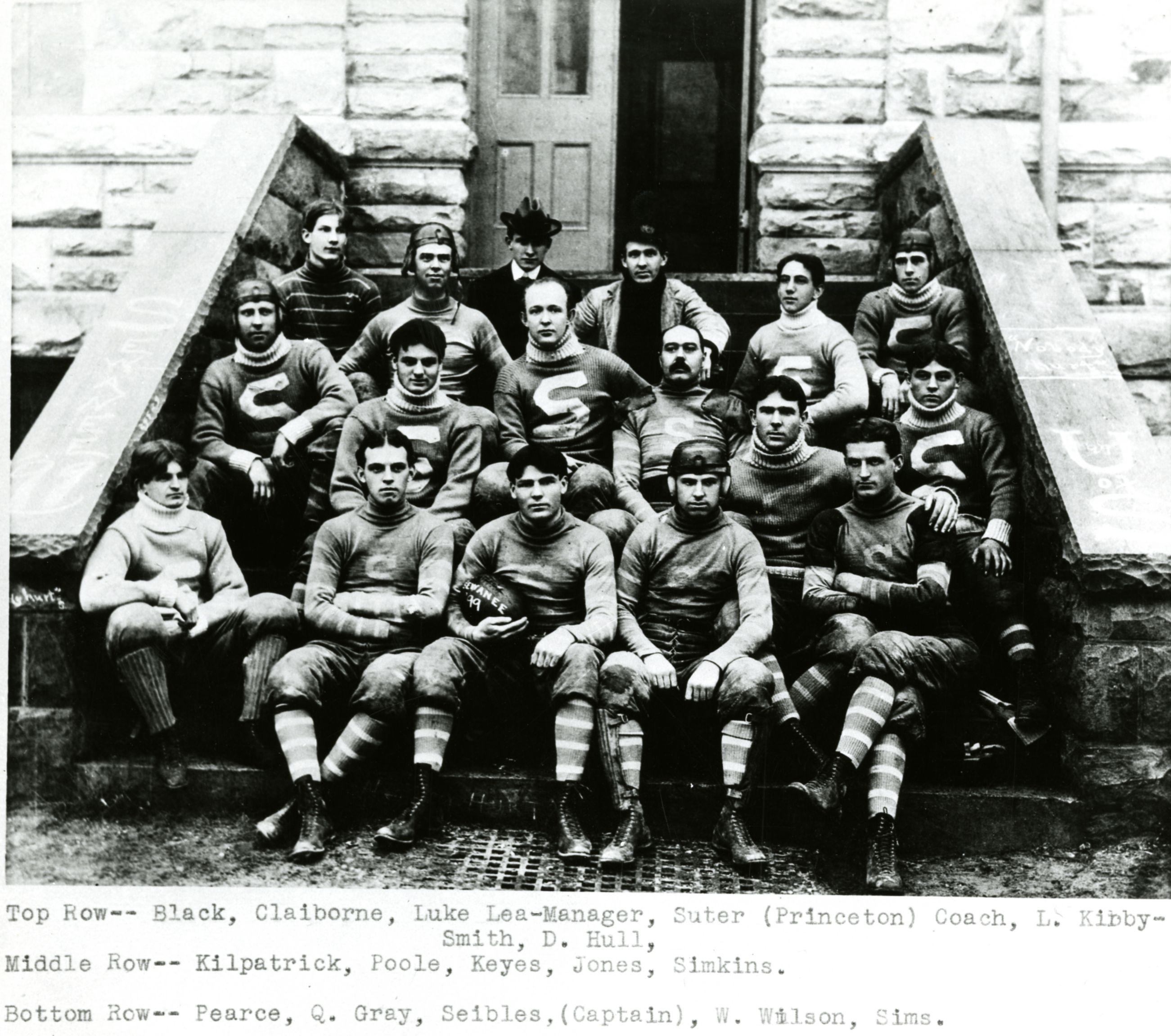
Sewanee's 1899 "Iron Men".

It is thought that the first forward pass in football occurred in the SIAA's first season of play, on October 26, 1895, in a game between Georgia and North Carolina when, out of desperation, the ball was thrown by the North Carolina back Joel Whitaker instead of punted and George Stephens caught the ball. On November 9, 1895 John Heisman executed a hidden ball trick utilizing quarterback Reynolds Tichenor to get Auburn's only touchdown in a 6 to 9 loss to Vanderbilt. During the play the ball was snapped to a half-back who was able to slip it under the back of the quarterback's jersey and who in turn was able to trot in for the touchdown. This was also the first game in the south decided by a field goal. Heisman later used the trick against Pop Warner's Georgia team. Warner picked up the trick and later used it at Cornell against Penn State in 1897. He then used it in 1903 at Carlisle against Harvard and garnered national attention.

The 1897 Vanderbilt Commodores won the team's first conference title. The mythical title "champion of the south" had to be disputed with Virginia after a scoreless tie. The next season, the Cavaliers defeated Vanderbilt at Louisville 18–0 in the South's most anticipated game of the season. The Cavaliers ended the season with a loss to North Carolina, which finished what is to-date its only undefeated season.

The 1899 Sewanee Tigers are one of the all-time great teams of the early sport. The team went 12–0, outscoring opponents 322 to 10. Known as the "Iron Men", with just 18 men they had a six-day road trip with five shutout wins over Texas A&M; Texas; Tulane; LSU; and Ole Miss. It is recalled memorably with the phrase "and on the seventh day they rested". Grantland Rice called them "the most durable football team I ever saw." The only close game was an 11–10 win over John Heisman's Auburn Tigers. Auburn ran an early version of the hurry-up offense. A documentary on this team was released in 2022 called, Unrivaled: Sewanee 1899. Unrivaled: Sewanee 1899

Organized intercollegiate football was first played in the state of Florida in 1901. A 7-game series between intramural teams from Stetson and Forbes occurred in 1894. The first intercollegiate game between official varsity teams was played on November 22, 1901. Stetson beat Florida Agricultural College at Lake City, one of the four forerunners of the University of Florida, 6–0, in a game played as part of the Jacksonville Fair.

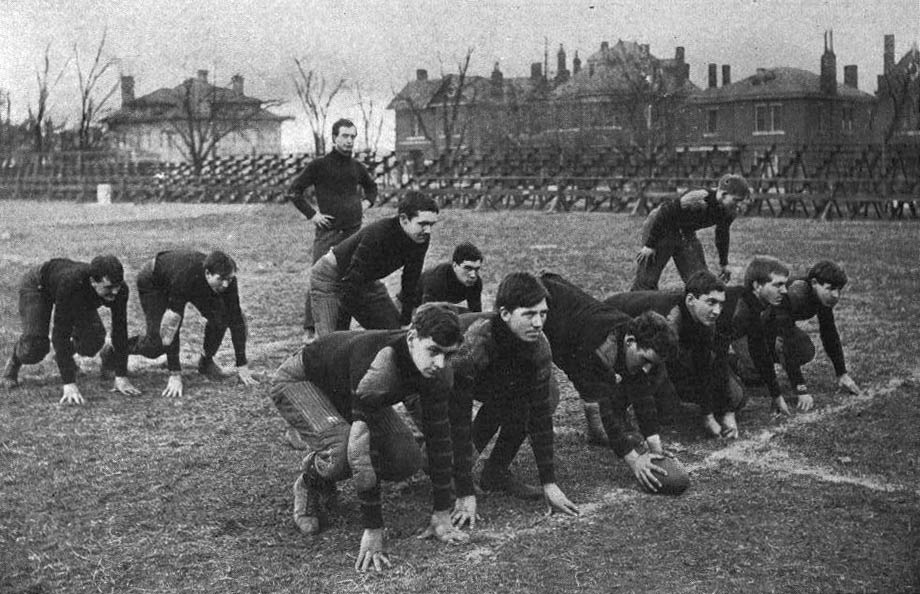
1904 Vanderbilt team in action.

On Thanksgiving Day 1903 a game was scheduled in Montgomery, Alabama between the best teams from each region of the Southern Intercollegiate Athletic Association for an "SIAA championship game", pitting Cumberland against Heisman's Clemson. The game ended in an 11–11 tie causing many teams to claim the title. Heisman pressed hardest for Cumberland to get the claim of champion. It was his last game as Clemson head coach.

1904 saw big coaching hires in the south: Mike Donahue at Auburn, John Heisman at Georgia Tech, and Dan McGugin at Vanderbilt were all hired that year. Both Donahue and McGugin just came from the north that year, Donahue from Yale and McGugin from Michigan, and were among the initial inductees of the College Football Hall of Fame. The undefeated 1904 Vanderbilt team scored an average of 52.7 points per game, the most in college football that season, and allowed just four points. One publication claims "The first scouting done in the South was in 1905, when Dan McGugin and Captain Innis Brown, of Vanderbilt went to Atlanta to see Sewanee play Georgia Tech."

===== Southwest =====
The first college football game in Oklahoma Territory occurred on November 7, 1895, when the 'Oklahoma City Terrors' defeated the Oklahoma Sooners 34 to 0. The Terrors were a mix of Methodist college students and high schoolers. The Sooners did not manage a single first down. By next season, Oklahoma coach John A. Harts had left to prospect for gold in the Arctic. Organized football was first played in the territory on November 29, 1894, between the Oklahoma City Terrors and Oklahoma City High School. The high school won 24 to 0.

===== Pacific Coast =====
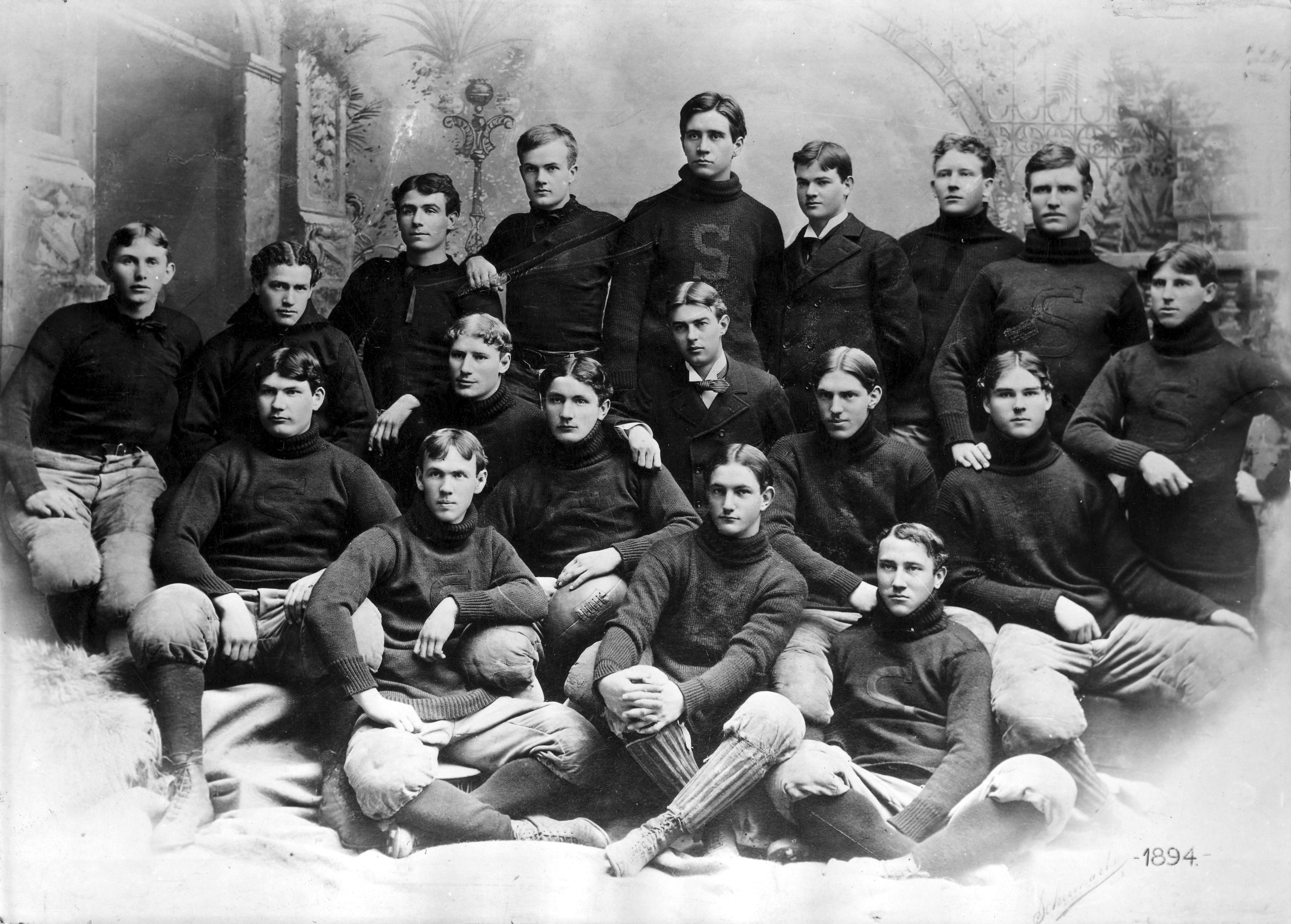
The 1894 Stanford football team.

In 1891, the first Stanford football team was hastily organized and played a four-game season beginning in January 1892 with no official head coach. Following the season, Stanford captain John Whittemore wrote to Yale coach Walter Camp asking him to recommend a coach for Stanford. To Whittemore's surprise, Camp agreed to coach the team himself, on the condition that he finish the season at Yale first. As a result of Camp's late arrival, Stanford played just three official games, against San Francisco's Olympic Club and rival California. The team also played exhibition games against two Los Angeles area teams that Stanford does not include in official results. Camp returned to the East Coast following the season, then returned to coach Stanford in 1894 and 1895. Herbert Hoover was Stanford's student financial manager.

On December 25, 1894, Amos Alonzo Stagg's Chicago Maroons agreed to play Camp's Stanford football team in San Francisco in the first postseason intersectional contest, foreshadowing the modern bowl game. Future president Herbert Hoover was Stanford's student financial manager. Chicago won 24 to 4. Stanford won a rematch in Los Angeles on December 29 by 12 to 0.

USC first fielded an American football team in 1888. Playing its first game on November 14 of that year against the Alliance Athletic Club, in which USC gained a 16–0 victory. Frank Suffel and Henry H. Goddard were playing coaches for the first team which was put together by quarterback Arthur Carroll; who in turn volunteered to make the pants for the team and later became a tailor. USC faced its first collegiate opponent the following year in fall 1889, playing St. Vincent's College to a 40–0 victory. In 1893, USC joined the Intercollegiate Football Association of Southern California (the forerunner of the SCIAC), which was composed of USC, Occidental College, Throop Polytechnic Institute (Caltech), and Chaffey College. Pomona College was invited to enter, but declined to do so. An invitation was also extended to Los Angeles High School.

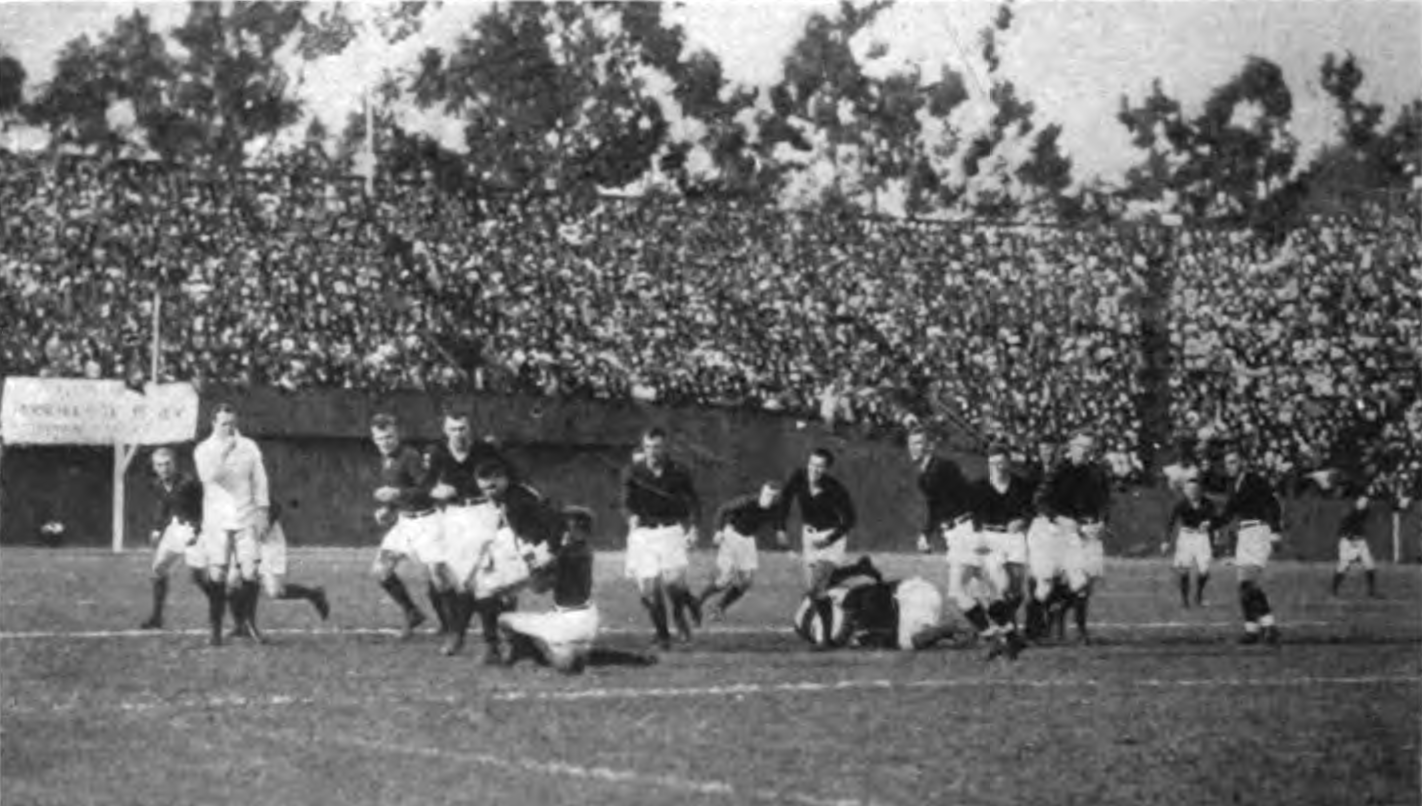
The Big Game between Stanford and California was played as rugby union from 1906 to 1914.

The Big Game between Stanford and California is the oldest college football rivalry in the West. The first game was played on San Francisco's Haight Street Grounds on March 19, 1892, with Stanford winning 14–10. The term "Big Game" was first used in 1900, when it was played on Thanksgiving Day in San Francisco. During that game, a large group of men and boys, who were observing from the roof of the nearby S.F. and Pacific Glass Works, fell into the fiery interior of the building when the roof collapsed, resulting in 13 dead and 78 injured. On December 4, 1900, the last victim of the disaster (Fred Lilly) died, bringing the death toll to 22; and, to this day, the "Thanksgiving Day Disaster" remains the deadliest accident to kill spectators at a U.S. sporting event.

The University of Oregon began playing American football in 1894 and played its first game on March 24, 1894, defeating Albany College 44–3 under head coach Cal Young. Cal Young left after that first game and J.A. Church took over the coaching position in the fall for the rest of the season. Oregon finished the season with two additional losses and a tie, but went undefeated the following season, winning all four of its games under head coach Percy Benson. In 1899, the Oregon football team left the state for the first time, playing the California Golden Bears in Berkeley, California.

American football at Oregon State University started in 1893 shortly after athletics were initially authorized at the college. Athletics were banned at the school in May 1892, but when the strict school president, Benjamin Arnold, died, President John Bloss reversed the ban. Bloss's son William started the first team, on which he served as both coach and quarterback. The team's first game was an easy 63–0 defeat over the home team, Albany College.

In May 1900, Fielding H. Yost was hired as the football coach at Stanford University, and, after traveling home to West Virginia, he arrived in Palo Alto, California, on August 21, 1900. Yost led the 1900 Stanford team to a 7–2–1, outscoring opponents 154 to 20. The next year in 1901, Yost was hired by Charles A. Baird as the head football coach for the Michigan Wolverines football team. On January 1, 1902, Yost's dominating 1901 Michigan Wolverines football team agreed to play a 3–1–2 team from Stanford University in the inaugural Tournament East-West football game what is now known as the Rose Bowl Game by a score of 49–0 after Stanford captain Ralph Fisher requested to quit with eight minutes remaining.

The 1905 season marked the first meeting between Stanford and USC. Consequently, Stanford is USC's oldest existing rival. The Big Game between Stanford and Cal on November 11, 1905, was the first played at Stanford Field, with Stanford winning 12–5.

===== Missouri Valley =====
The 1905 Washburn vs. Fairmount football game marked the first experiment with the forward pass and with the ten-yard requirement for first downs.

===== Mountain West =====
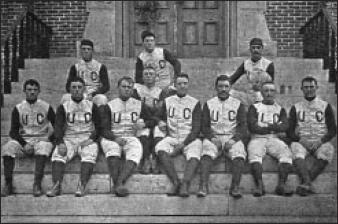
Colorado's First Football Team in 1890.

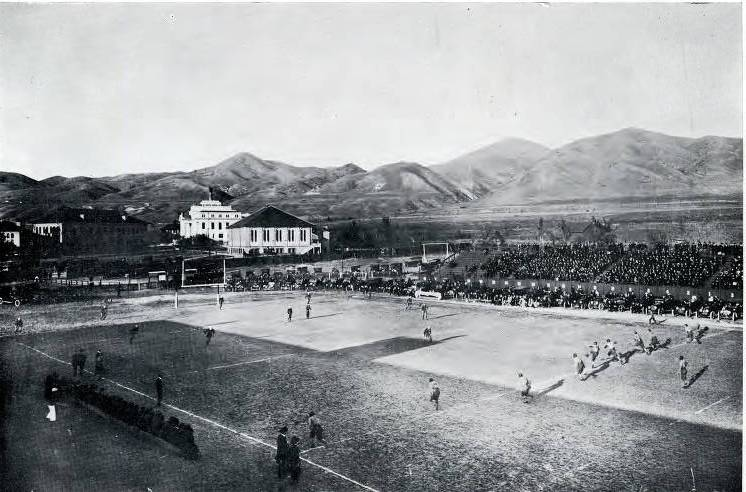
Kickoff during the 1916 Colorado – Utah game

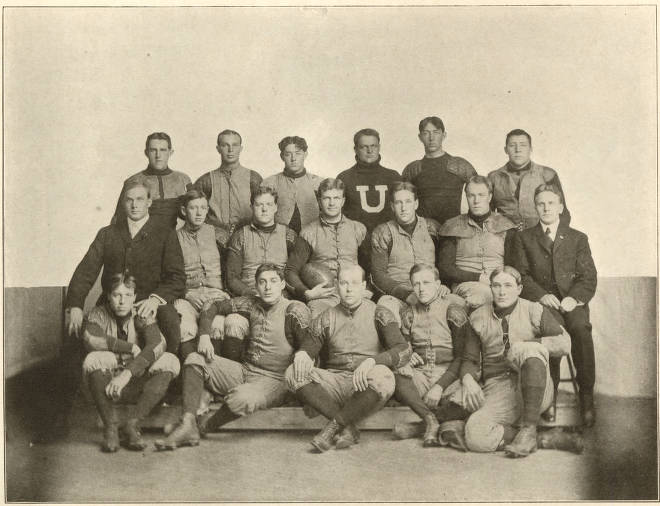
The 1905 Utah football team

The University of Colorado Boulder began playing American football in 1890. Colorado found much success in its early years, winning eight Colorado Football Association Championships (1894–97, 1901–08).

The following was taken from the Silver & Gold newspaper of December 16, 1898. It was a recollection of the birth of Colorado football written by one of CU's original gridders, John C. Nixon, also the school's second captain. It appears here in its original form:

At the beginning of the first semester in the fall of '90 the boys rooming at the dormitory on the campus of the U. of C. being afflicted with a super-abundance of penned up energy, or perhaps having recently drifted from under the parental wing and delighting in their newly found freedom, decided among other wild schemes, to form an athletic association. Messrs Carney, Whittaker, Layton and others, who at that time constituted a majority of the male population of the university, called a meeting of the campus boys in the old medical building. Nixon was elected president and Holden secretary of the association.

It was voted that the officers constitute a committee to provide uniform suits in which to play what was called "association football". Suits of flannel were ultimately procured and paid for assessments on the members of the association and generous contributions from members of the faculty.

...

The Athletic Association should now invigorate its base-ball and place it at par with its football team; and it certainly has the material with which to do it. The U of C should henceforth lead the state and possibly the west in athletic sports.

...

The style of football playing has altered considerably; by the old rules, all men in front of the runner with the ball, were offside, consequently we could not send backs through and break the line ahead of the ball as is done at present. The notorious V was then in vogue, which gave a heavy team too much advantage. The mass plays being now barred, skill on the football field is more in demand than mere weight and strength.

— Silver & Gold

In 1909, the Rocky Mountain Athletic Conference was founded, featuring four members, Colorado, Colorado College, Colorado School of Mines, and Colorado Agricultural College. The University of Denver and the University of Utah joined the RMAC in 1910. For its first thirty years, the RMAC was considered a major conference equivalent to today's Division I, before 7 larger members left and formed the Mountain States Conference (also called the Skyline Conference).

==== Violence and controversy (1905) ====
No sport is wholesome in which ungenerous or mean acts which easily escape detection contribute to victory.

— Charles William Eliot, president of Harvard University (1869–1909) opposing football in 1905.

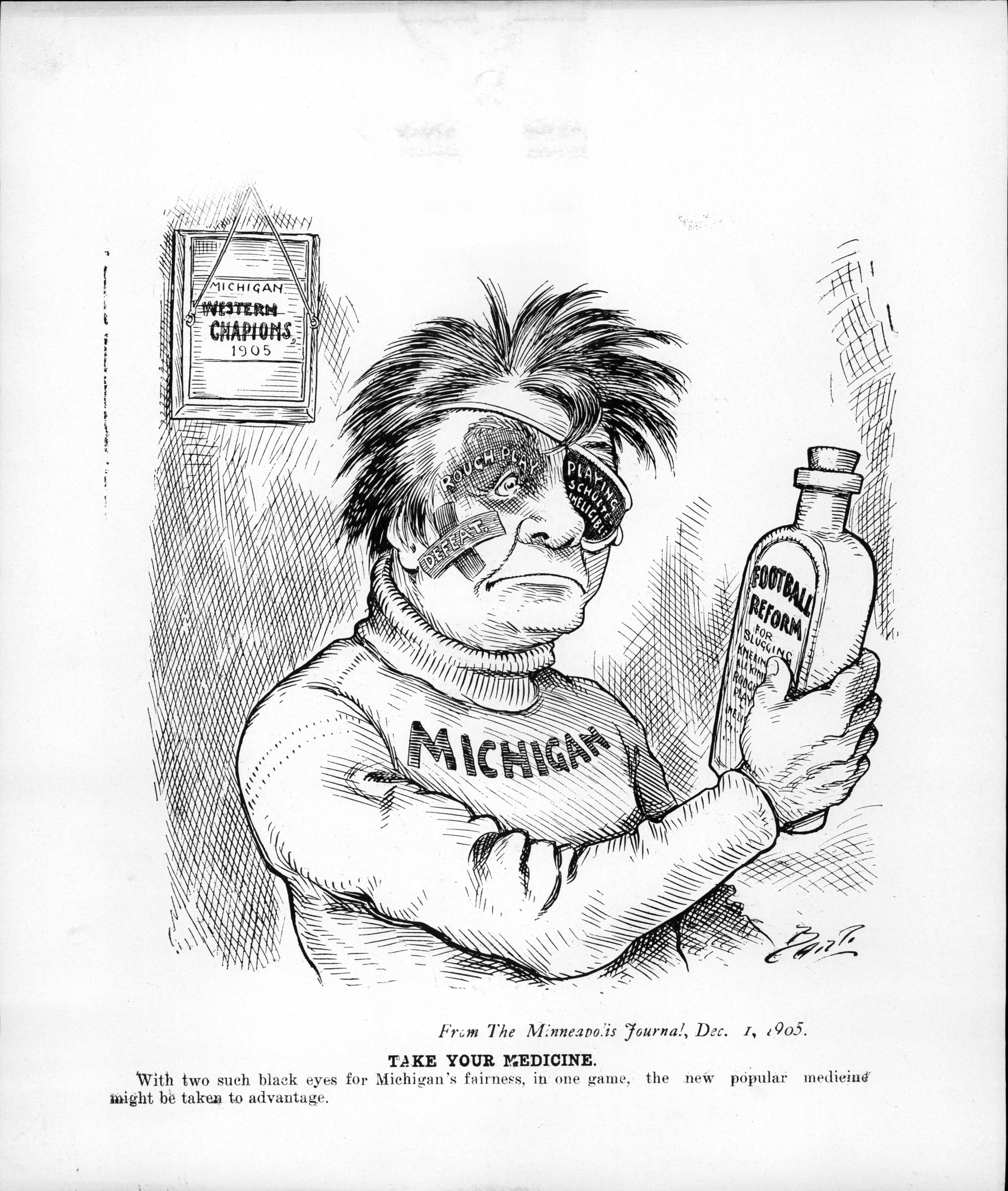
1905 cartoon advocating for football reform

A Scottish author wrote in 1908 that

The British newspaper reader is apt to obtain his idea of the importance and standing of American universities chiefly from the accounts of their athletic prowess, which was measured roughly, a few years ago, by the number of students who were killed or maimed in the course of a season's football.

From its earliest days as a mob game, football was a violent sport. The 1894 Harvard–Yale game, known as the "Hampden Park Blood Bath", resulted in crippling injuries for four players; the contest was suspended until 1897. The annual Army–Navy game was suspended from 1894 to 1898 for similar reasons. One of the major problems was the popularity of mass-formations like the flying wedge, in which a large number of offensive players charged as a unit against a similarly arranged defense. The resultant collisions often led to serious injuries and sometimes even death. Georgia fullback Richard Von Albade Gammon notably died on the field from concussions received against Virginia in 1897, causing Georgia, Georgia Tech, and Mercer to temporarily stop their football programs.

In 1905 there were 19 fatalities nationwide. President Theodore Roosevelt reportedly threatened to shut down the game if drastic changes were not made. However, the threat by Roosevelt to eliminate football is disputed by sports historians. What is absolutely certain is that on October 9, 1905, Roosevelt held a meeting of football representatives from Harvard, Yale, and Princeton. Though he lectured on eliminating and reducing injuries, he never threatened to ban football. He also lacked the authority to abolish football and was, in fact, actually a fan of the sport and wanted to preserve it. The President's sons were also playing football at the college and secondary levels at the time.

Meanwhile, John H. Outland held an experimental game in Wichita, Kansas that reduced the number of scrimmage plays to earn a first down from four to three in an attempt to reduce injuries. The Los Angeles Times reported an increase in punts and considered the game much safer than regular play but that the new rule was not "conducive to the sport". Finally, on December 28, 1905, 62 schools met in New York City to discuss rule changes to make the game safer. As a result of this meeting, the Intercollegiate Athletic Association of the United States, later named the National Collegiate Athletic Association (NCAA), was formed. One rule change introduced in 1906, devised to open up the game and reduce injury, was the introduction of the legal forward pass. Though it was underutilized for years, this proved to be one of the most important rule changes in the establishment of the modern game.

==== Move towards modernization and innovation (1906–1932) ====
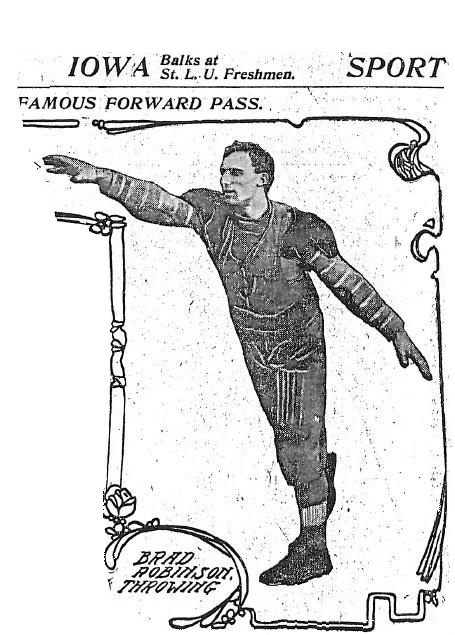
1906 St. Louis Post-Dispatch photograph of Brad Robinson, who threw the first legal forward pass and was the sport's first triple threat

As a result of the 1905–1906 reforms, mass formation plays became illegal and forward passes legal. Bradbury Robinson, playing for visionary coach Eddie Cochems at St. Louis University, threw the first legal pass in a September 5, 1906, game against Carroll College at Waukesha. Other important changes, formally adopted in 1910, were the requirements that at least seven offensive players be on the line of scrimmage at the time of the snap, that there be no pushing or pulling, and that interlocking interference (arms linked or hands on belts and uniforms) was not allowed. These changes greatly reduced the potential for collision injuries. Several coaches emerged who took advantage of these sweeping changes. Amos Alonzo Stagg introduced such innovations as the huddle, the tackling dummy, and the pre-snap shift. Other coaches, such as Pop Warner and Knute Rockne, introduced new strategies that still remain part of the game.

Besides these coaching innovations, several rules changes during the first third of the 20th century had a profound impact on the game, mostly in opening up the passing game. In 1914, the first roughing-the-passer penalty was implemented. In 1918, the rules on eligible receivers were loosened to allow eligible players to catch the ball anywhere on the field—previously strict rules were in place only allowing passes to certain areas of the field. Scoring rules also changed during this time: field goals were lowered to three points in 1909 and touchdowns raised to six points in 1912.

Star players that emerged in the early 20th century include Jim Thorpe, Red Grange, and Bronko Nagurski; these three made the transition to the fledgling NFL and helped turn it into a successful league. Sportswriter Grantland Rice helped popularize the sport with his poetic descriptions of games and colorful nicknames for the game's biggest players, including Notre Dame's "Four Horsemen" backfield and Fordham University's linemen, known as the "Seven Blocks of Granite".

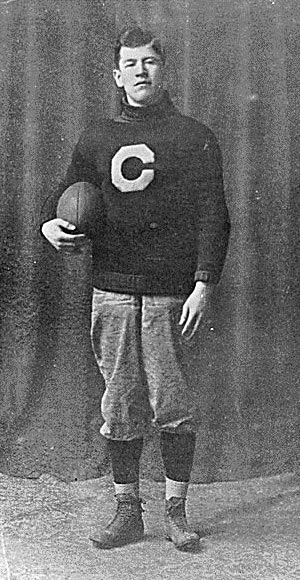
Thorpe at Carlisle.

Thorpe gained nationwide attention for the first time in 1911. He scored all his team's points—four field goals and a touchdown—in an 18–15 upset of Harvard. The 1912 season included many rule changes such as the 100-yard field and the 6-point touchdown. The first six-point touchdowns were registered in Carlisle's 50–7 win over Albright College on September 21. At season's end, Jim Thorpe had rushed for some 2,000 yards. Thorpe also competed in track and field, baseball, lacrosse and even ballroom dancing, winning the 1912 intercollegiate ballroom dancing championship. In the spring of 1912, he started training for the Olympics.

When Army scheduled Notre Dame as a warm-up game in 1913, they thought little of the small school. The end Knute Rockne and quarterback Gus Dorais made innovative use of the forward pass, still at that point a relatively unused weapon, to defeat Army 35–13 and helped establish the school as a national power. By 1915, Minnesota developed the first great passing combination of Pudge Wyman to Bert Baston.

===== East =====
The "Big Three" continued their dominance in the early era of the forward pass. Yale's Ted Coy was selected as fullback on Camp's All-Time All-America team. "He ran through the line with hammering, high knee action then unleashed a fast, fluid running motion through the secondary." The Minnesota shift gained national attention when it was adopted by Yale in 1910. Henry L. Williams, an 1891 graduate of Yale, had earlier repeatedly offered to mentor his alma mater in the formation, but was rebuffed because the Elis would "not [take] football lessons from a Western university." In 1910, the Elis suffered early season setbacks at the hands of inferior opponents, and sought an advantage to use in its game against strong Princeton and Harvard squads. Former Yale end Thomas L. Shevlin, who had served as an assistant coach at Minnesota, taught the team the shift. Yale used the Minnesota shift against both opponents, and beat Princeton, 5–3, and tied Harvard, 0–0.

Fritz Pollard

Fritz Pollard attended Brown University, where he majored in chemistry and played half-back on the Brown football team. In 1916 he led Brown to the second Rose Bowl in 1916, in which he was the first black player to play in the Rose Bowl. He became the first black back to be named to Walter Camp's All-America team in 1916, with Camp ranking Pollard as "one of the greatest runners these eyes have ever seen". For his exploits at Brown, Pollard was elected to the National College Football Hall of Fame in 1954 — the first black person ever chosen.

The game between West Virginia and Pittsburgh on October 8, 1921, saw the first live radio broadcast of a college football game when Harold W. Arlin announced that year's Backyard Brawl played at Forbes Field on KDKA. Pitt won 21–13.

Bill Roper had installed a passing attack at Princeton. On October 28, 1922, Princeton and Chicago played the first game to be nationally broadcast on radio. Princeton won 21–18 in a hotly contested game which had Princeton dubbed the "Team of Destiny" by Grantland Rice.

In 1925, Dartmouth beat Cornell 62–13 on its way to a national title. Swede Oberlander threw for 6 touchdowns and accounted for 477 yards of total offense. Cornell coach Gil Dobie retorted "We won 13–0. Passing is not football."

===== Midwest =====
In 1907 at Champaign, Illinois Chicago and Illinois played in the first game to have a halftime show featuring a marching band. Chicago won 42–6.

====== Notre Dame and Iowa ======
Knute Rockne took over from his predecessor Jesse Harper in the war-torn season of 1918 with a team including George Gipp and Curly Lambeau. With Gipp, Rockne had an ideal handler of the forward pass, and a receiver in Bernard Kirk. The 1919 team went undefeated and were a national champion. Gipp died December 14, 1920 1920, just two weeks after being elected Notre Dame's first All-American by Walter Camp. Gipp likely contracted strep throat and pneumonia while giving punting lessons after his final game, November 20 against Northwestern University. Since antibiotics were not available in the 1920s, treatment options for such infections were limited and they could be fatal even to young, healthy individuals.

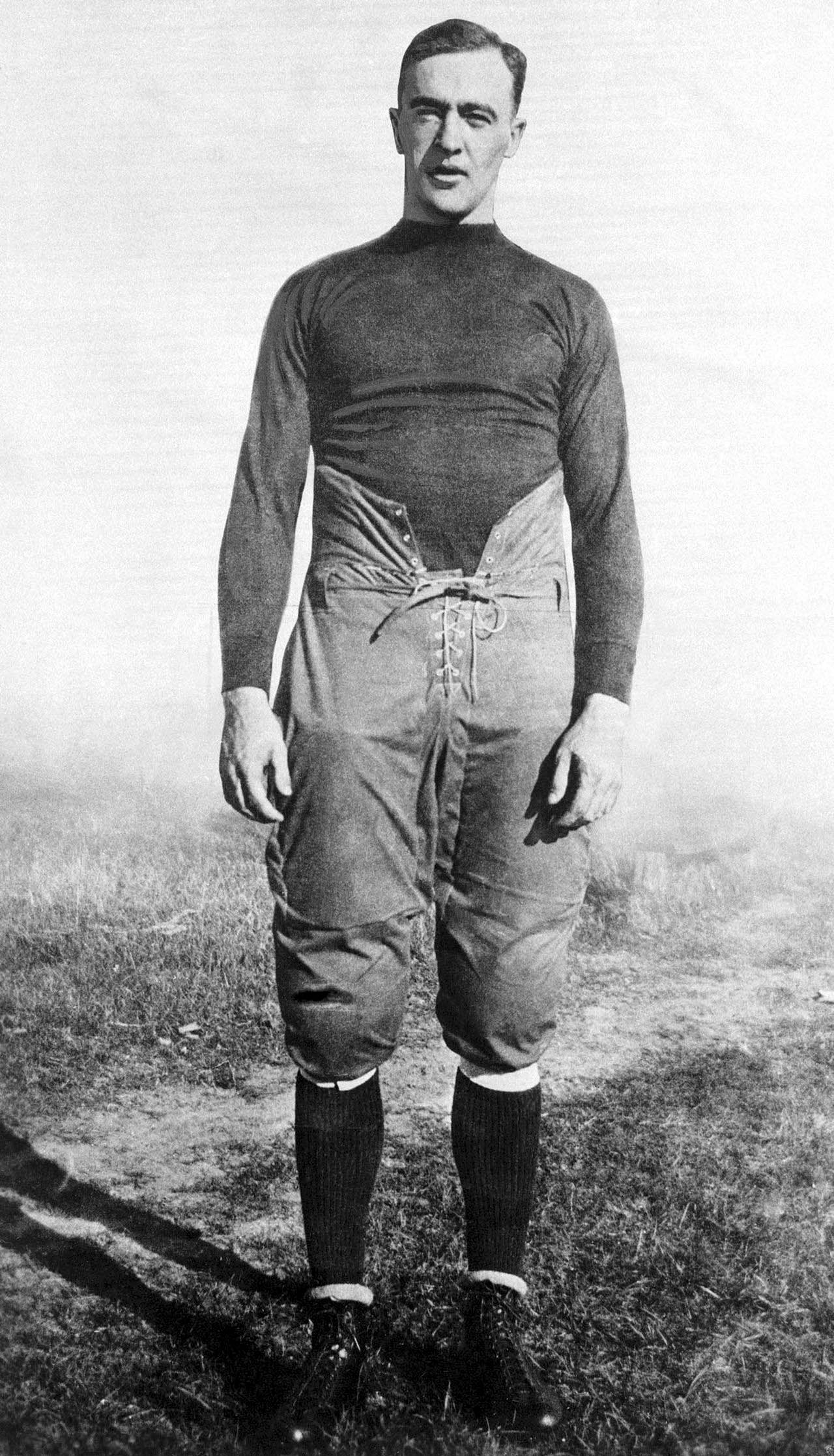
George Gipp

John Mohardt led the 1921 Notre Dame team to a 10–1 record, suffering its only loss to Howard Jones coached and Aubrey Devine-led Iowa. Grantland Rice wrote that "Mohardt could throw the ball to within a foot or two of any given space" and noted that the 1921 Notre Dame team "was the first team we know of to build its attack around a forward passing game, rather than use a forward passing game as a mere aid to the running game". Mohardt had both Eddie Anderson and Roger Kiley at end to receive his passes.

The loss to Iowa snapped a 20-game winning streak for Rockne and Notre Dame, which would be the longest winning streak of Rockne's career. One of the criticisms fans had of the previous Iowa coach, Hawley, was that he could not convince talented Iowa players to play at Iowa. Jones succeeded in that respect; the 1921 Hawkeyes started 11 native Iowans. Despite the graduations of many key players, Iowa again posted a perfect 7–0 final record in 1922. Iowa again went 5–0 in the Big Ten, capturing its second straight Big Ten crown. It is the only time in Iowa history that the Hawkeyes have won consecutive conference titles.

The 1924 Irish featured the "Four Horsemen": Harry Stuhldreher, Don Miller, Jim Crowley, and Elmer Layden. The Irish capped an undefeated, 10–0 season with a victory over Stanford in the Rose Bowl. Stanford's Ernie Nevers played all 60 minutes in the game and rushed for 114 yards, more yardage than all the Four Horsemen combined.

In 1927, Rockne's complex shifts led directly to a rule change whereby all offensive players had to stop for a full second before the ball could be snapped. On November 10, 1928, when the "Fighting Irish" team was losing to Army 6–0 at the end of the half, Rockne entered the locker room and told the team the words he heard on Gipp's deathbed in 1920: "I've got to go, Rock. It's all right. I'm not afraid. Some time, Rock, when the team is up against it, when things are going wrong and the breaks are beating the boys, tell them to go in there with all they've got and win just one for the Gipper. I don't know where I'll be then, Rock. But I'll know about it, and I'll be happy." This inspired the team, which then outscored Army in the second half and won the game 12–6. The phrase "Win one for the Gipper" was later used as a political slogan by Ronald Reagan, who in 1940 portrayed Gipp in Knute Rockne, All American. The 1929 and 1930 Notre Dame teams were also declared national champions.

====== Michigan and Illinois ======
Bernard Kirk transferred to Michigan in 1920, and died in a car wreck after being selected All-American in 1922. Michigan won a national title in 1923, led by the likes of Harry Kipke and Jack Blott. In 1925, Benny Friedman to Bennie Oosterbaan proved one of the sport's great pass-receiver combinations. Yost proclaimed the 1925 team his greatest.

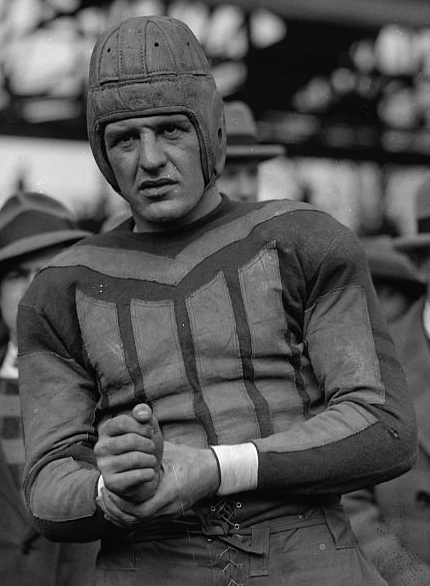
Red Grange

Also in 1923, Red Grange burst on the scene at Illinois. Grange then vaulted to national prominence as a result of his performance in the October 18, 1924, game against Michigan. This was the grand opening game for the new Memorial Stadium, built as a memorial to University of Illinois students and alumni who had served in World War I. The Michigan Wolverines were going for the national championship. He returned the opening kickoff for a 95-yard touchdown and scored three more touchdowns on runs of 67, 56, and 44 yards in the first 12 minutes–the last three in less than seven minutes. On his next carry, he ran 56 yards for yet another touchdown. Before the game was over, Grange ran back another kickoff for yet another touchdown. He scored six touchdowns in all. Illinois won the game by a lopsided score of 39 to 14.

The game inspired Grantland Rice to write this poetic description:

A streak of fire, a breath of flame
Eluding all who reach and clutch;
A gray ghost thrown into the game
That rival hands may never touch;
A rubber bounding, blasting soul
Whose destination is the goal — Red Grange of Illinois!

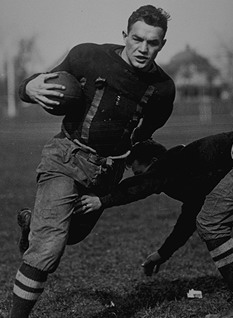
Chic Harley

====== Ohio State ======
Chic Harley was Ohio State's first All-American in his freshman year, who in his senior year led the team to its first victory over arch-rival Michigan. In 1941, James Thurber described Harley's running skills for the New York City newspaper, PM, "If you never saw him run with a football, I can't describe it to you. It wasn't like Red Grange or Tom Harmon or anybody else. It was kind of a cross between music and cannon fire, and it brought your heart up under your ears." The OSU Marching Band has changed its script "Ohio" formation to spell "Chic" on several occasions, including a Michigan game where Harley was in attendance.

===== South =====
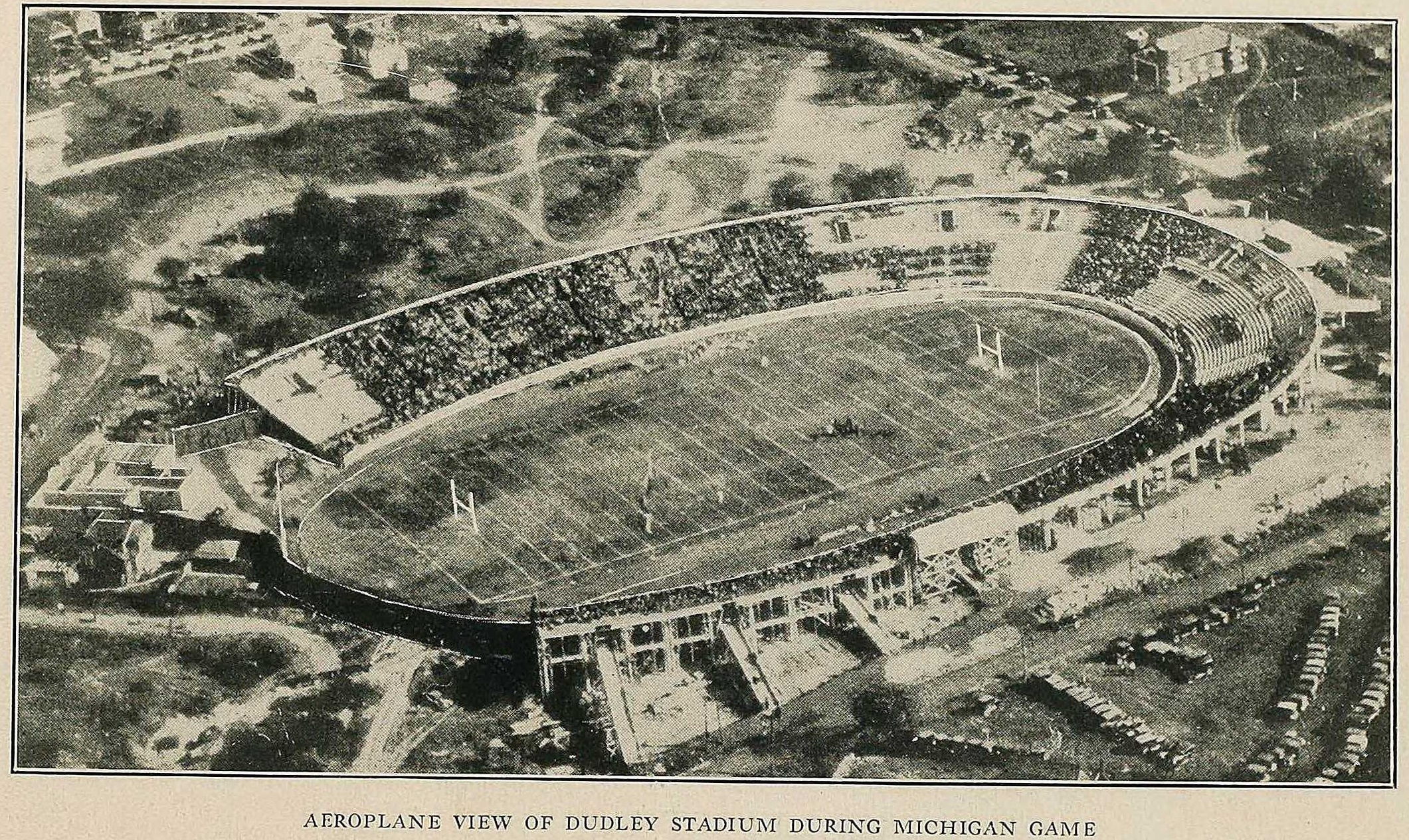
Dudley Field in 1922.

Fuzzy Woodruff claims Davidson was the first in the south to throw a legal forward pass in 1906.

====== Vanderbilt ======
In 1906 Vanderbilt defeated Carlisle 4 to 0, the result of a Bob Blake field goal, and the south's "crowning feat". In 1907 Vanderbilt fought Navy to a 6 to 6 tie. That same season saw Vanderbilt execute a double pass play to set up the touchdown that beat conference-rival Sewanee in a meeting of unbeatens for the SIAA championship. Grantland Rice cited this event as the greatest thrill he ever witnessed in his years of watching sports. Vanderbilt coach Dan McGugin in Spalding's Football Guide's summation of the season in the SIAA wrote "The standing. First, Vanderbilt; second, Sewanee, a might good second;" and that Aubrey Lanier "came near winning the Vanderbilt game by his brilliant dashes after receiving punts." Bob Blake threw the final pass to center Stein Stone, catching it near the goal amongst defenders. Honus Craig then ran in the winning touchdown.

In 1910 Vanderbilt held defending national champion Yale to a scoreless tie, the south's first great triumph against an Eastern power.

In 1922, Vanderbilt fought Michigan to a scoreless tie at the inaugural game on Dudley Field, the first stadium in the South made exclusively for college football. Michigan coach Fielding Yost and Vanderbilt coach Dan McGugin were brothers-in-law, and the latter the protege of the former. The game featured the season's two best defenses and included a goal line stand by Vanderbilt to preserve the tie. Its result was "a great surprise to the sporting world". Commodore fans celebrated by throwing some 3,000 seat cushions onto the field. The game features prominently in Vanderbilt's history.

====== Georgia Tech ======
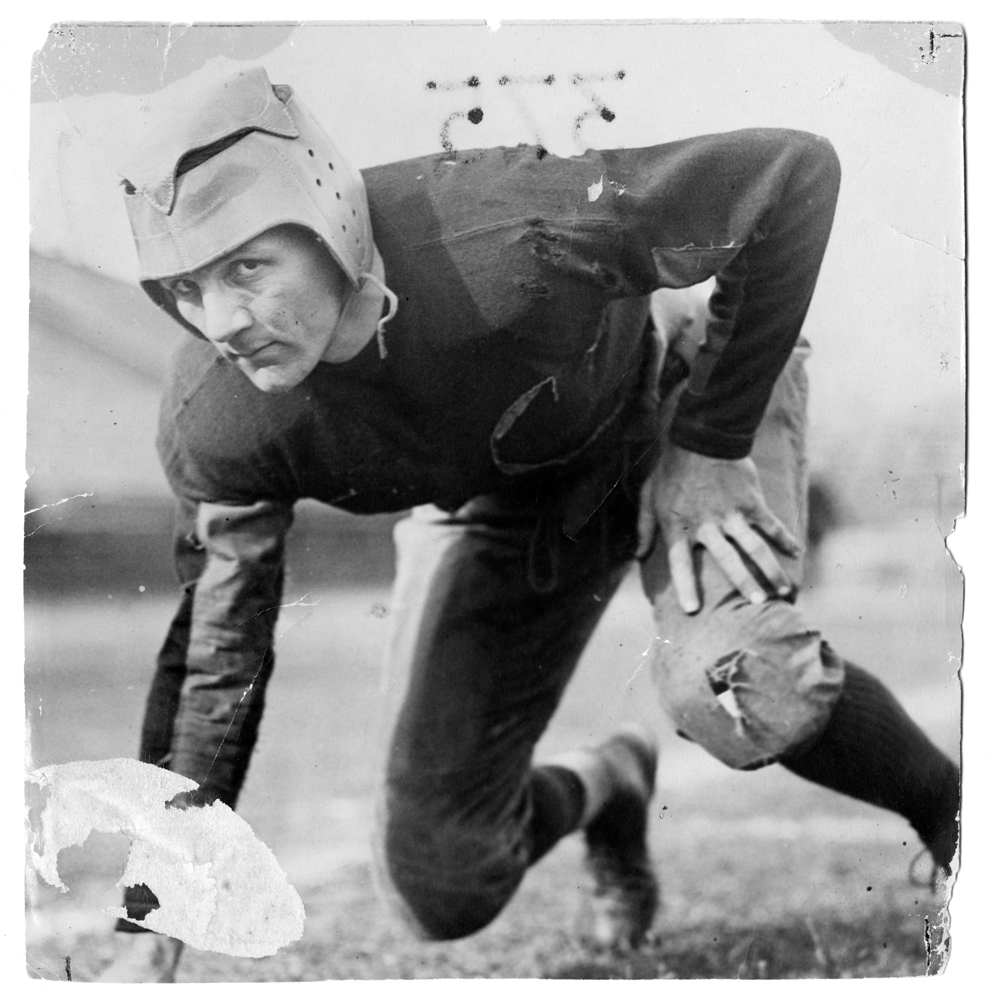
Everett Strupper

Utilizing the "jump shift" offense, John Heisman's Georgia Tech Golden Tornado won 222 to 0 over Cumberland on October 7, 1916, at Grant Field in the most lopsided victory in college football history. Tech went on a 33-game winning streak during this period. The 1917 team was the first national champion from the South, led by a powerful backfield of Joe Guyon, Everett Strupper, Albert Hill, and Judy Harlan. It had the first two players from the Deep South selected first-team All-American in Strupper and tackle Walker Carpenter. Strupper, aside from his quickness, overcame deafness and handled the signals like a regular quarterback. He could also read a defender's lips. Pop Warner's Pittsburgh Panthers were also undefeated, but declined a challenge by Heisman to a game. When Heisman left Tech after 1919, his shift was still employed by protege William Alexander.

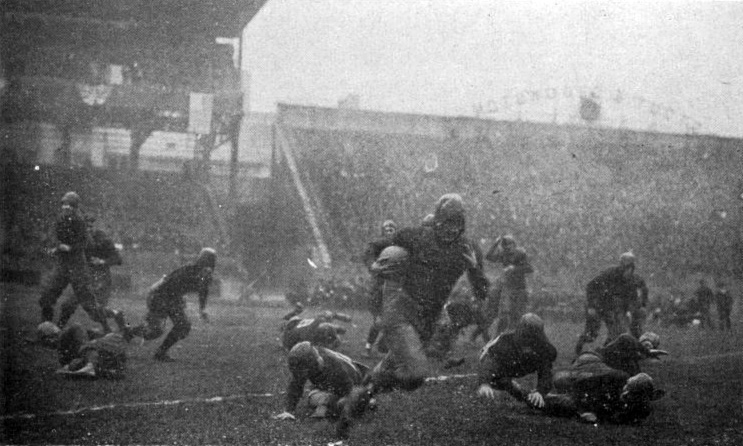
Tom Davies runs against undefeated and unscored upon Georgia Tech in the 1918 game at Forbes Field.

Helping Georgia Tech's claim to a title in 1917, the Auburn Tigers held undefeated, Chic Harley-led Big Ten champion Ohio State to a scoreless tie the week before Georgia Tech beat the Tigers 68 to 7. The next season, with many players gone due to World War I, a game was finally scheduled at Forbes Field with Pittsburgh. The Panthers, led by freshman Tom Davies, defeated Georgia Tech 32 to 0, hurting the south's chances at recognition for many years. Despite this, Tech center Bum Day was the first player on a Southern team ever selected first-team All-American by Walter Camp.

====== Centre ======
1917 saw the rise of another Southern team in Centre of Danville, Kentucky. In 1919, Centre went undefeated and defeated West Virginia. Bo McMillin and Red Weaver were consensus All-America. In 1921, McMillin-led Centre upset defending national champion Harvard 6 to 0 in what is widely considered one of the greatest upsets in college football history.

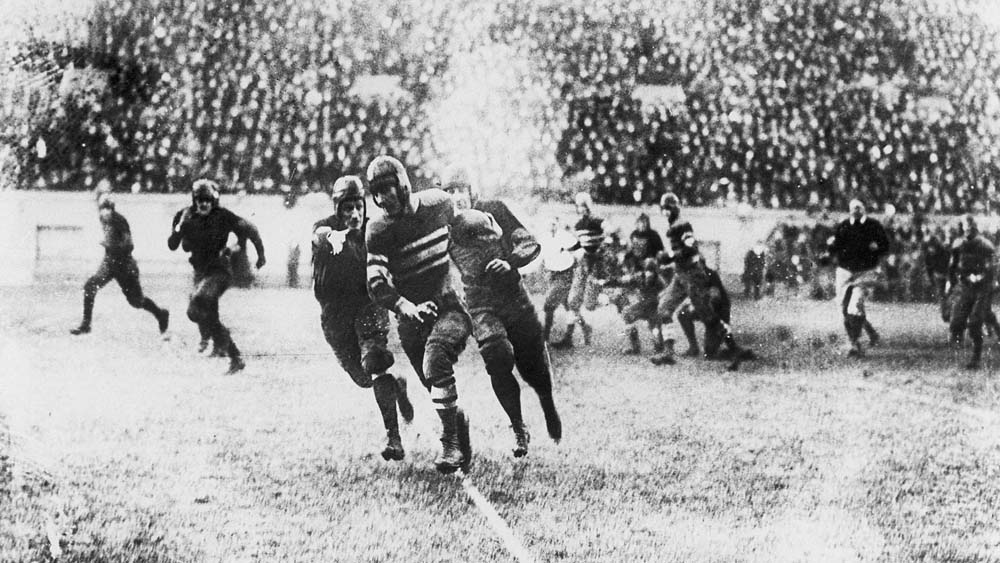
McMillin scores on Harvard.

Vanderbilt's line coach in the undefeated seasons of 1921 and 1922 was Wallace Wade, a graduate of Brown who ran interference for Pollard. He accepted the job at Alabama the season after Alabama upset Penn 9 to 7.

====== "Game that changed the south" ======
In 1925, Wade coached Alabama to the south's first Rose Bowl victory. That Rose Bowl game is commonly referred to as "the game that changed the south". Wade followed up the 1926 season with an undefeated record and Rose Bowl tie. Wade's Alabama again won a national championship and Rose Bowl in 1930.

1925 also saw the widespread use of the forward pass in the south for the first time. By 1927, Vanderbilt's Bill Spears led the nation in passing. That same season, Georgia's "dream and wonder team" defeated Yale for the first time 14–10. Georgia Tech, led by Heisman protege William Alexander, gave the "dream and wonder team" its only loss. The next season Tech won the Rose Bowl, including Roy Riegels' wrong-way run, and were declared national champions. On October 12, 1929, Yale lost to Georgia in Sanford Stadium in its first trip to the south.

Robert Neyland was hired by Tennessee in 1926, expressly to beat Vanderbilt. After losing to Vanderbilt in his first season, Neyland lost just a single contest from 1927 to 1932, to Wade's 1930 Alabama team.

===== Southwest =====
The forward pass was brought to the southwest by former Vanderbilt star and SMU coach Ray Morrison. Gerald Mann was his most notable passer.

===== Pacific coast =====
In 1906, citing concerns about the violence in American Football, universities on the West Coast, led by California and Stanford, replaced the sport with rugby union. At the time, the future of American football was very much in doubt and these schools believed that rugby union would eventually be adopted nationwide. Other schools followed suit and also made the switch included Nevada, St. Mary's, Santa Clara, and USC (in 1911). However, due to the perception that West Coast football was inferior to the game played on the East Coast anyway, East Coast and Midwest teams shrugged off the loss of the teams and continued playing American football. With no nationwide movement, the available pool of rugby teams to play remained small. The schools scheduled games against local club teams and reached out to rugby union powers in Australia, New Zealand, and especially, due to its proximity, Canada. The annual Big Game between Stanford and California continued as rugby, with the winner invited by the British Columbia Rugby Union to a tournament in Vancouver over the Christmas holidays, with the winner of that tournament receiving the Cooper Keith Trophy.

====== Stanford ======
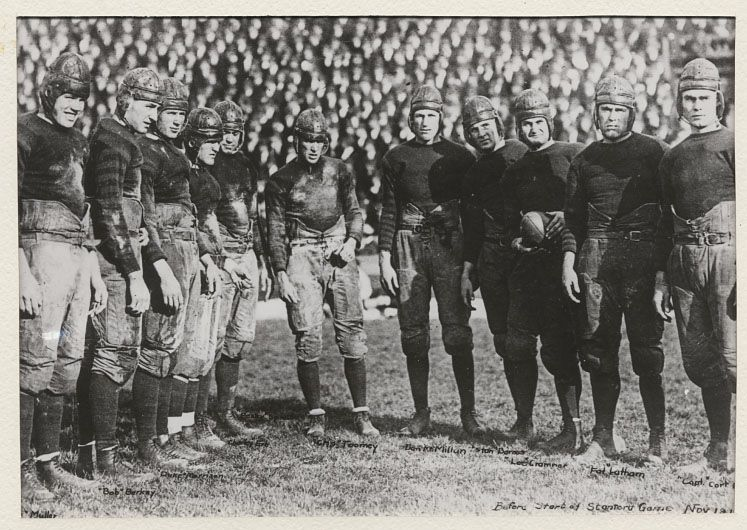
Cal's 1920 Wonder Team

During 12 seasons of playing rugby union, Stanford was remarkably successful: the team had three undefeated seasons, three one-loss seasons, and an overall record of 94 wins, 20 losses, and 3 ties for a winning percentage of .816. However, after a few years, the school began to feel the isolation of its newly adopted sport, which was not spreading as many had hoped. Students and alumni began to clamor for a return to American football to allow wider intercollegiate competition. The onset of World War I gave Stanford an out: in 1918, the Stanford campus was designated as the Students' Army Training Corps headquarters for all of California, Nevada, and Utah, and the commanding officer, Sam M. Parker, decreed that American football was the appropriate athletic activity to train soldiers and rugby union was dropped.

====== Cal ======
The pressure at rival California was stronger (especially as the school had not been as successful in the Big Game as they had hoped), and in 1915 California returned to American football. As reasons for the change, the school cited rule change back to American football, the overwhelming desire of students and supporters to play American football, interest in playing other East Coast and Midwest schools, and a patriotic desire to play an "American" game. California's return to American football increased the pressure on Stanford to also change back in order to maintain the rivalry. Stanford played its 1915, 1916, and 1917 "Big Games" as rugby union against Santa Clara and California's football "Big Game" in those years was against Washington, but both schools desired to restore the old traditions. From 1920 to 1924, California's "Wonder Teams" went undefeated with three claimed national titles in a row. The 1921 Rose Bowl between Cal and Ohio State drew some of the first national attention for a use of the forward pass when Cal end Harold Muller completed a 53-yard pass to Brodie Stephens. The next year's Rose Bowl featured a controversial, scoreless tie between Cal and Washington & Jefferson. The 1922 Cal team went undefeated and led the major colleges in scoring with 398 points.

====== USC ======
Howard Jones arrived at USC in 1925. Heading into the 1930 Rose Bowl, USC had defeated its crosstown rival UCLA 76–0 in their first meeting.

===== Missouri Valley =====
On November 25, 1911 Kansas and Missouri played the first homecoming football game. The game was "broadcast" play-by-play over telegraph to at least 1,000 fans in Lawrence, Kansas. It ended in a 3–3 tie.

==== Innovators and Motivators (1894–1932) ====
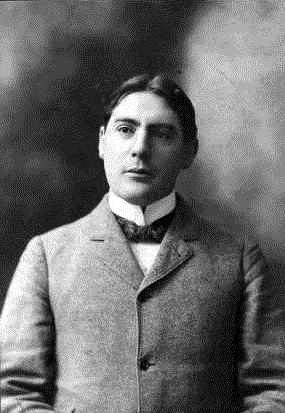
Parke H. Davis, head football coach, Lafayette College (1895–98)

Although Walter Camp is widely considered to have been the "Father of American football", the development of the game was collaborative in nature and many different people contributed to the early development of the game.

===== Parke H. Davis =====
Parke H. Davis played lineman at Princeton for one year in 1889 and then later coached at Wisconsin (1893), Amherst (1894) and Lafayette (1895–98), where he also served as athletic director. He led Lafayette to a National Championship in 1896 on the coattails of his star player, Fielding Yost. Later he also served on the Rules Committee from 1909 to 1915, playing a key role in shaping the evolution of the game. Among the innovations with which he is credited are the division of the game into quarters, numbering of players, abolition of inter-locked interference and the creation of end zones. In 1911, he wrote a book on the early history of American football entitled Football, the American collegiate game. This book remains an important source of information on the early development of American football. He also authored articles on American football for the Encyclopædia Britannica and compiled a glossary of American football terms.

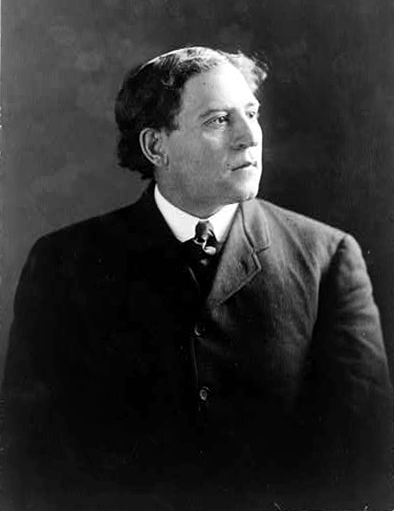
Amos Stagg

===== Amos Alonzo Stagg =====
Amos Alonzo Stagg played under Walter Camp as an end and divinity student at Yale University and coached the University of Chicago to prominence. Some consider Stagg to be the sport's greatest innovator due to inventions of his. Some examples include trick plays such as the end-around and the Statue of Liberty, maneuvers such as shifts and motion, equipment such as hip pads, and the first book on football with diagrams. Stagg coached football until the age of 96 and later died at the age of 102 in 1965. A story of Stagg from his older days tells how he would keep his front lawn in immaculate shape, so that the children living in his neighborhood would have a good surface to play football on.

===== John Heisman =====
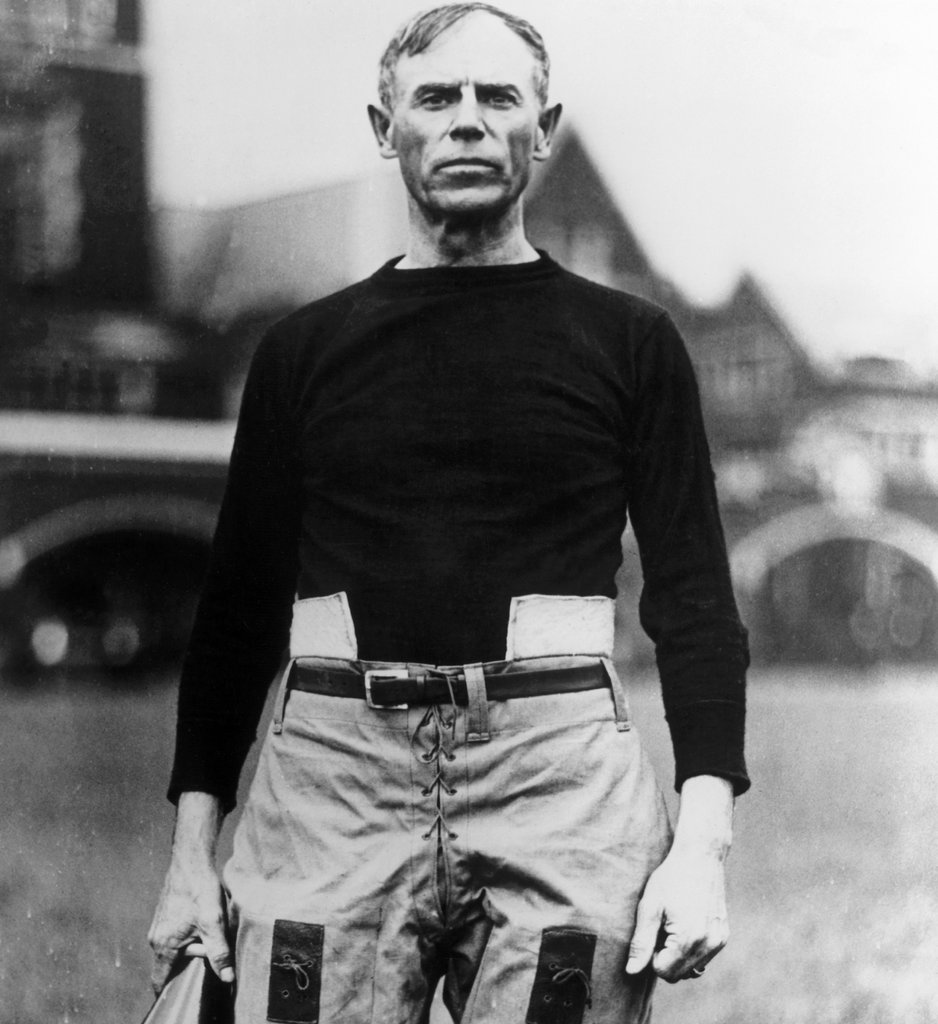
John Heisman

John Heisman served as the head football coach at Oberlin College (1892, 1894), Buchtel College—now known as the University of Akron (1893–1894), Auburn University (1895–1899), Clemson University (1900–1903), Georgia Tech (1904–1919), the University of Pennsylvania (1920–1922), Washington & Jefferson College (1923), and Rice University (1924–1927), compiling a career college football record of 186–70–18 with a National Championship in 1917 while at Georgia Tech. Heisman had an extensive vocabulary, and in the offseason was a Shakespearean actor. He was known to begin each season by saying to his freshmen; "What is this? It is a prolate spheroid, an elongated sphere in which the outer leather casing is drawn tightly over a somewhat smaller rubber tubing. Better to have died as a small boy than to fumble this football." He was an innovator and developed one of the first shifts, had both guards pull to lead an end run, and had his center toss the ball back, instead of rolling or kicking it. He was one of the strongest proponents for the legalization of the forward pass in 1906 and he originated the "hike" or "hep" shouted by the quarterback to start each play. The Heisman Memorial Trophy was named after him, and is now given to the player voted as the season's most outstanding collegiate football player.

===== William H. Lewis =====
Following his graduation at Harvard law school, William H. Lewis was hired as a football coach at Harvard, where he served from 1895 to 1906. During his coaching tenure, the team had a combined record of 114–15–5. Lewis also developed a reputation as one of the most knowledgeable experts on the game. In 1896, Lewis wrote one of the first books on American football, A Primer of College Football, published by Harper & Brothers, and serialized by Harper's Weekly.

===== Fielding "Hurry Up" Yost =====
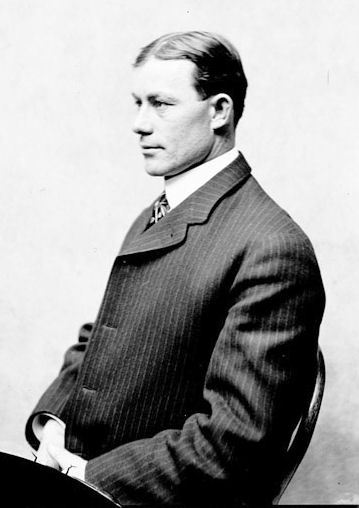
Fielding Yost

Fielding H. Yost's biggest contribution was building the first traditional midwestern power at the University of Michigan. He first played at West Virginia University as a law student. Yost became a remarkable personification of "if you can't beat 'em, join 'em." He transferred in mid-season to join Coach Parke H. Davis's national championship team at Lafayette. Just a week after playing against Davis in West Virginia, Yost was playing for Davis in Lafayette's historic 6–4 win over the Penn Quakers. Yost utilized a short punt system. In the early days of the sport the ball was often moved up the field, not through offensive plays, but rather through punting. Once the opposing team got the ball, the defense was relied upon to make the other team's offense lose yards or fumble. To confuse the opponent and attain longer punts, the punting was often done on first or second downs and it was not uncommon for a team to kick more than 40 times in a game. Yost also invented the position of linebacker; co-created the first ever bowl game, the 1902 Rose Bowl, with then legendary UM athletic director Charles Baird; invented the fieldhouse concept that bears his name; and supervised the building of the first on-campus building dedicated to intramural sports. Yost retired in 1926.

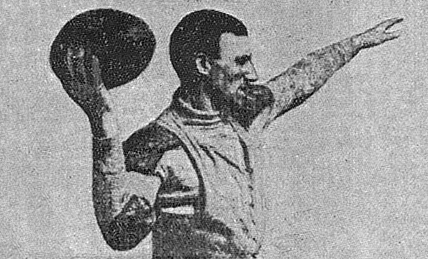
Brad Robinson demonstrating "Overhand spiral—fingers on lacing" in "The Forward Pass and On-Side Kick" an article in Spalding's How to Play Foot Ball, American Sports Publishing, Revised 1907 edition, written by Eddie Cochems, Walter Camp, Editor

===== Eddie Cochems =====
Eddie Cochems was the head football coach at North Dakota State (1902–1903), Clemson (1905), Saint Louis University (1906–1908), and Maine (1914). During his three years at St. Louis, he was the first American football coach to build an offense around the forward pass, which became a legal play in the 1906 college football season. Using the forward pass, Cochems' 1906 team compiled an undefeated 11–0 record, led the nation in scoring, and outscored opponents by a combined score of 407 to 11. He is considered by some to be the "father of the forward pass" in American football. Knute Rockne biographer, Ray Robinson, wrote, "The St. Louis style of forward pass, as implemented by Cochems, was different from the pass being thrown by eastern players. Cochems did not protect his receiver by surrounding him with teammates, as was the case in the East." After the 1906 season, Cochems published a 10-page article entitled "The Forward Pass and On-Side Kick" in the 1907 edition of Spalding's How to Play Foot Ball (edited by Walter Camp). Cochems explained in words and photographs (of Robinson) how the forward pass could be thrown and how passing skills could be developed. "[T]he necessary brevity of this article will not permit of a detailed discussion of the forward pass", Cochems lamented. "Should I begin to explain the different plays in which the pass ... could figure, I would invite myself to an endless task." In a 1932 interview with a Wisconsin sports columnist, Cochems claimed that Yale, Harvard and Princeton (the so-called "Big Three" football powers in the early decades of the sport) all called him in having him explain the forward pass to them.

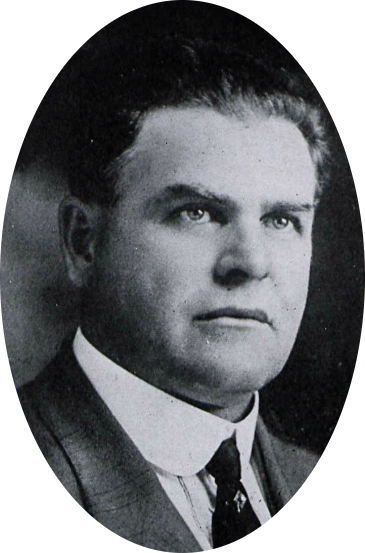
"Pop" Warner

===== Henry L. Williams =====
Williams built the University of Minnesota into a power and developed a famous shift. It was the forerunner to all quick shifts in American football.

===== Glenn "Pop" Warner =====
Glenn "Pop" Warner coached at several schools throughout his career, including the University of Georgia, Cornell University, University of Pittsburgh, Stanford University, and Temple University. One of his most famous stints was at the Carlisle Indian Industrial School, where he coached Jim Thorpe, who went on to become the first president of the National Football League, an Olympic Gold Medalist, and is widely considered one of the best overall athletes in history. Warner wrote one of the first important books of football strategy, Football for Coaches and Players, published in 1927. Though the shift was invented by Stagg, Warner's single wing and double wing formations greatly improved upon it; for almost 40 years, these were among the most important formations in football. As part of his single and double wing formations, Warner was one of the first coaches to effectively utilize the forward pass. Among his other innovations are modern blocking schemes, shoulder pads, and the three-point stance. The youth football league, Pop Warner Little Scholars, was named in his honor.

===== Robert Zuppke =====
Robert Zuppke built the University of Illinois into a power and was a noted innovator. Zuppke led his teams to four national championships in 1914, 1919, 1923, and 1927. Zuppke served as the president of the American Football Coaches Association in 1925. Zuppke is credited for many football inventions and traditions, including the huddle and the flea flicker. He was also a painter and known for his aphoristic remarks called "Zuppkeisms".

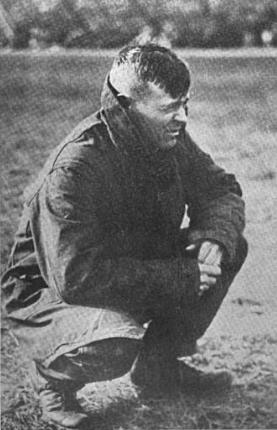
Bob Zuppke

===== Dan McGugin =====
Dan McGugin played at Drake University and under Fielding Yost as a guard and punter on the "point-a-minute" Michigan teams. He brought Vanderbilt University to prominence as a southern power ever since his first year as a head coach. Sportswriter Fuzzy Woodruff once wrote "The plain facts of the business are that McGugin stood out in the South like Gulliver among the native sons of Lilliput. There was no foeman worthy of the McGugin steel;" and Fred Russell wrote "For years he ruled supreme in Dixie, and his teams won many glorious intersectional victories. More than any one man, he was responsible for the progress of southern football ... He was the first coach to successfully work the onside kick. He was among the first to have his guards pull ... His name will never die." Grantland Rice said of McGugin: "I have known a long parade of football coaches ... but I have never met one who combined more of the qualities needed to make a great coach." The Vanderbilt athletics office building, the McGugin Center, bears his name, and McGugin was an inaugural inductee into the College Football Hall of Fame. McGugin retired in 1934, and died in January 1936.

===== Gil Dobie =====
"Gloomy Gil" Dobie was an inaugural inductee into the College Football Hall of Fame and led Cornell University to three straight national titles and a 26-game winning streak; he also coached at the University of Washington and never lost a game, including a 39-game winning streak. He was known as "gloomy" since he was given to pessimistic predictions about his teams.

===== Dana X. Bible =====
Dana X. Bible won titles at Texas A&M University as well as brought the University of Texas to prominence. Bible's 1919 Texas A&M Aggies football team, which was undefeated, untied, and outscored its opposition 275–0, was retroactively named a national champion by the Billingsley Report and the National Championship Foundation. While at Texas, University of Chicago coach Clark Shaughnessy contacted Bible to organize a clinic on the T formation. Along with Frank Leahy of Notre Dame, they helped create the T formation revolution. Bible served on the National Collegiate Football Rules Committee for 25 years, and was president of the American Football Coaches Association.

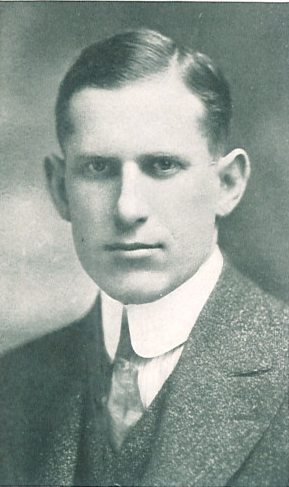
Howard Jones

===== Andy Smith =====
Andy Smith coached the "Wonder Teams" of the University of California, Berkeley which from 1920 to 1924 went undefeated, running up a record of 44–0–2 and winning three NCAA-recognized national championships. The 1920 Rose Bowl winning team outscored its opponents 510 to 14. Smith was an inaugural inductee into the College Football Hall of Fame. In 1960, the respected Helms Athletic Foundation crowned the 1920 "Wonder Team", as the greatest American football team in history. The California Memorial Stadium is still known today as "The House that Smith Built." Smith was famous for his defense-oriented strategy of "Kick and wait for the breaks". Smith also became known for trick plays such as the halfback pass. At the time because of the plump, rugby-like ball, forward passes over 30 yards in length were unanticipated.

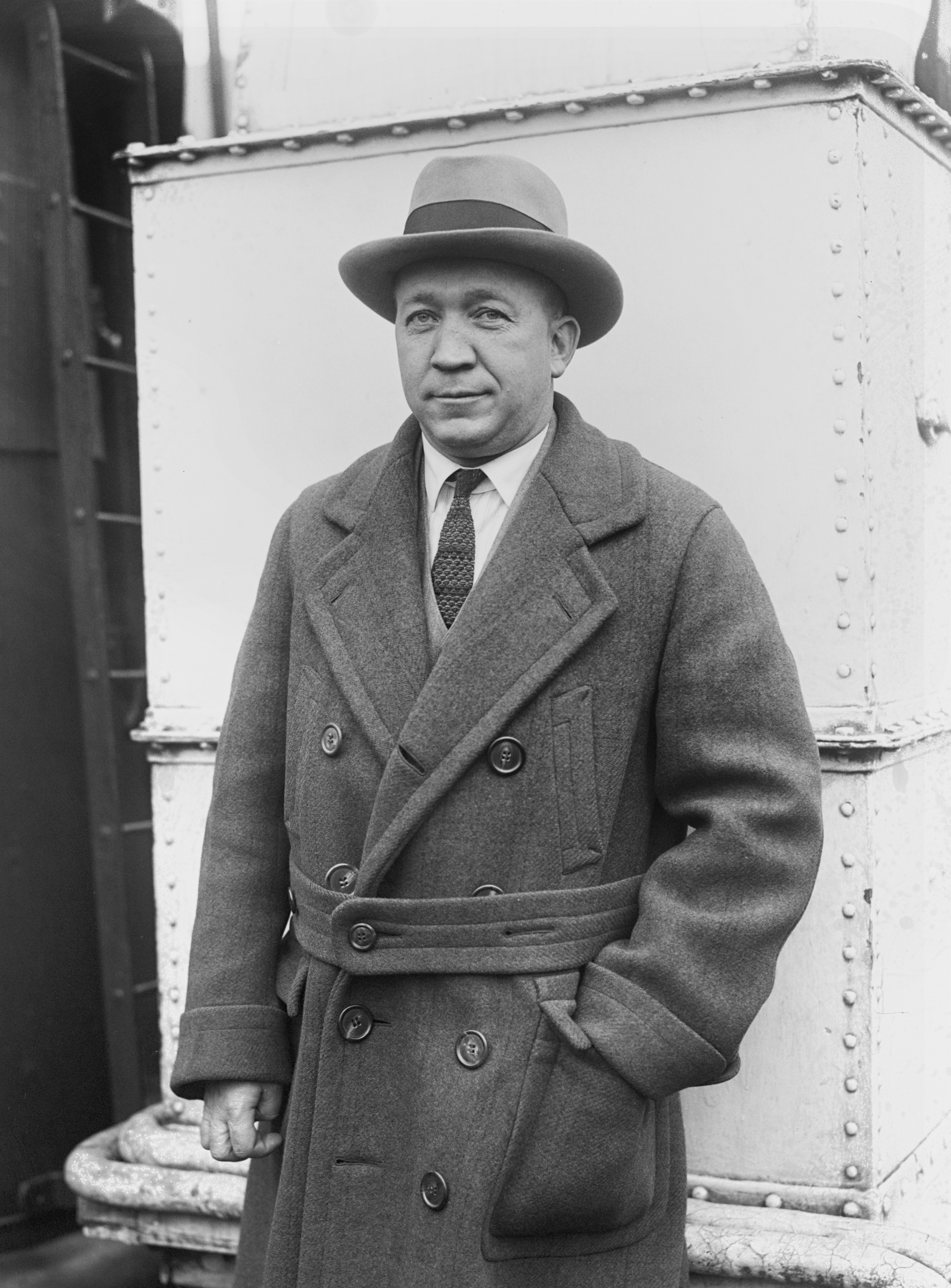
Coach Rockne

===== Howard Jones =====
Howard Jones led his alma mater Yale to a national title, the Iowa Hawkeyes to two undefeated seasons, and the USC Trojans to four national titles and five Rose Bowl victories. Along with Smith, Jones vies for the title of greatest coach of the era on the Pacific Coast. Jones was known for being completely absorbed in the sport and aloof outside of it. USC historian Al Wesson remarks "Howard lived and breathed football. If it were not for football, he would have starved to death – couldn't possibly have made a living in business." Jones was an inaugural inductee into the College Football Hall of Fame.

===== Knute Rockne =====
Knute Rockne rose to prominence in 1913 as an end and chemistry student for the University of Notre Dame, then a largely unknown Midwestern Catholic school. Rockne returned to coach the team in 1918, and devised the powerful Notre Dame Box offense, based on Warner's single wing. He is credited with being the first major coach to emphasize offense over defense. Rockne is also credited with popularizing and perfecting the forward pass, a seldom used play at the time. Rather than simply a regional team, Rockne's "Fighting Irish" became famous for barnstorming and played any team at any location. It was during Rockne's tenure that the annual Notre Dame-University of Southern California rivalry began. He led his team to a 105–12–5 record before his premature death in a plane crash in 1931. He was so famous at that point that his funeral was broadcast nationally on radio. His biography at the College Football Hall of Fame calls him "without question, American football's most-renowned coach."

== Early history of professional football (1892–1932) ==
=== Early players, teams, and leagues (1892–1919) ===
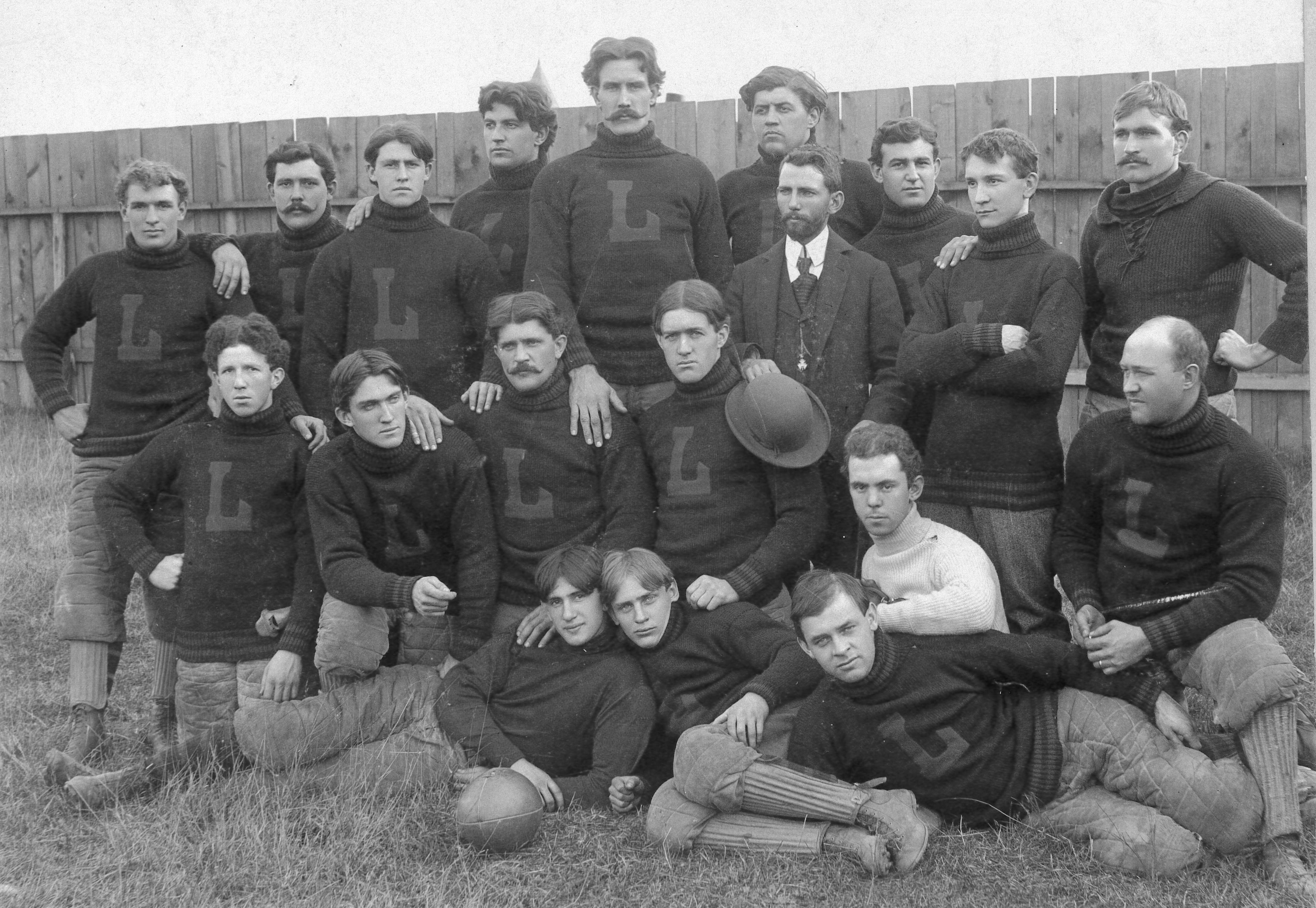
1897 Latrobe Athletic Association football team: The first entirely professional team to play an entire season

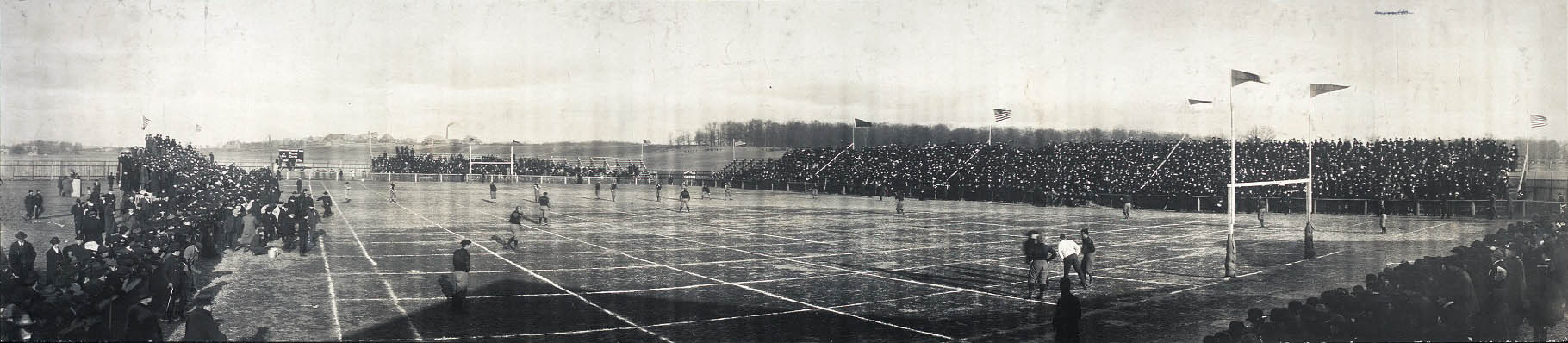
Canton Bulldogs vs. Massillon Tigers playing on grid field on November 24, 1906, during the betting scandal

In the early 20th century, football began to catch on in the general population of the United States and was the subject of intense competition and rivalry, albeit of a localized nature. Although payments to players were considered unsporting and dishonorable at the time, a Pittsburgh area club, the Allegheny Athletic Association, of the unofficial western Pennsylvania football circuit, surreptitiously hired former Yale All-American guard Pudge Heffelfinger. On November 12, 1892, Heffelfinger became the first known professional football player. He was paid $500 to play in a game against the Pittsburgh Athletic Club. Heffelfinger picked up a Pittsburgh fumble and ran 35 yards for a touchdown, winning the game 4–0 for Allegheny. Although observers held suspicions, the payment remained a secret for years.

On September 3, 1895, the first wholly professional game was played, in Latrobe, Pennsylvania, between the Latrobe Athletic Association and the Jeannette Athletic Club. Latrobe won the contest 12–0. During this game, Latrobe's quarterback, John Brallier became the first player to openly admit to being paid to play football. He was paid $10 plus expenses to play. In 1897, the Latrobe Athletic Association paid all of its players for the whole season, becoming the first fully professional football team. In 1898, William Chase Temple took over the team payments for the Duquesne Country and Athletic Club, a professional football team based in Pittsburgh from 1895 until 1900, becoming the first known individual football club owner. Later that year, the Morgan Athletic Club, on the South Side of Chicago, was founded. This team later became the Chicago Cardinals, then the St. Louis Cardinals and now is known as the Arizona Cardinals, making them the oldest continuously operating professional football team.

The first known professional football league, known as the National Football League (not the same as the modern league) began play in 1902 when several baseball clubs formed football teams to play in the league, including the Philadelphia Athletics, Pittsburgh Pirates and the Philadelphia Phillies. The Pirates' team the Pittsburgh Stars were awarded the league championship. However, the Philadelphia Football Athletics and Philadelphia Football Phillies also claimed the title. A five-team tournament, known as the World Series of Football was organized by Tom O'Rouke, the manager of Madison Square Garden. The event featured the first-ever indoor pro football games. The first professional indoor game came on December 29, 1902, when the Syracuse Athletic Club defeated the "New York team" 5–0. Syracuse would go on to win the 1902 Series, while the Franklin Athletic Club won the Series in 1903. The World Series only lasted two seasons.

The game moved west into Ohio, which became the center of professional football during the early decades of the 20th century. Small towns such as Massillon, Akron, Portsmouth, and Canton all supported professional teams in a loose coalition known as the "Ohio League", the direct predecessor to today's National Football League. In 1906 the Canton Bulldogs–Massillon Tigers betting scandal became the first major scandal in professional football in the United States. It was the first known case of professional gamblers attempting to fix a professional sport. Although the Massillon Tigers could not prove that the Canton Bulldogs had thrown the second game, the scandal tarnished the Bulldogs' name and helped ruin professional football in Ohio until the mid-1910s.

In 1915, the reformed Canton Bulldogs signed former Olympian and Carlisle Indian School standout Jim Thorpe to a contract. Thorpe became the face of professional football for the next several years and was present at the founding of the National Football League five years later. A disruption in play in 1918 (due to World War I and flu pandemic) allowed the New York Pro Football League to pick up some of the Ohio League's talent; the NYPFL had coalesced around 1916, but efforts to challenge the Ohio teams were largely unsuccessful until after the suspension. By 1919, the Ohio League and the New York league were on relatively equal footing with both each other and with teams clustered around major cities such as Philadelphia, Chicago and Detroit.

=== Early years of the NFL (1920–1932) ===
==== Formation ====
The 1919 expansion of top-level professional football threatened to drastically increase the cost of the game by sparking bidding wars. The various regional circuits determined that forming a league, with enforceable rules, would mitigate these problems.

In 1920, the American Professional Football Conference was founded, in a meeting at a Hupmobile car dealership in Canton, Ohio. Jim Thorpe was elected the league's first president. Initially the new league consisted only of the Ohio League teams, although some of the teams declined participation. After several more meetings, the league's membership was formalized. One month later on September 17, the league was renamed the American Professional Football Association, adding Buffalo and Rochester from the New York league, and Detroit, Hammond (a suburban Chicago squad), and several other teams from nearby circuits. The original teams were:

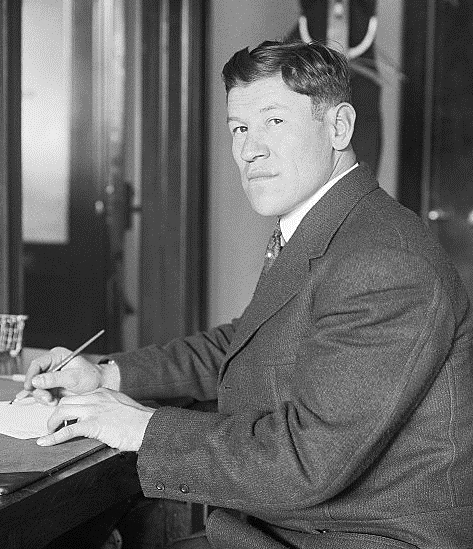
Jim Thorpe was the first president of the NFL.

- Akron Pros
- Buffalo All-Americans
- Canton Bulldogs
- Chicago Tigers
- Cleveland Indians
- Columbus Panhandles
- Dayton Triangles
- Decatur Staleys
- Detroit Heralds
- Hammond Pros
- Muncie Flyers
- Racine Cardinals
- Rochester Jeffersons
- Rock Island Independents

In its early years the league was little more than a formal agreement between teams to play each other and to declare a champion at season's end. Teams were still permitted to play non-league members. The 1920 season saw several teams drop out and fail to play through their schedule. Only four teams: Akron, Buffalo, Canton, and Decatur, finished the schedule. Akron claimed the first league champion, with the only undefeated record among the remaining teams.

From its inception in 1920 as a loose coalition of various regional teams, the American Professional Football Association had comparatively few African-American players; a total of nine black people suited up for NFL teams between 1920 and 1926, including future attorney, black activist, and internationally acclaimed artist Paul Robeson. Fritz Pollard and Bobby Marshall were the first black players in what is now the NFL in 1920. Pollard became the first black coach in 1921 and the first black quarterback in NFL in 1923.

==== Expansion ====
In 1921, several more teams joined the league, increasing the membership to 22 teams. Among the new additions were the Green Bay Packers, which now has the record for longest use of an unchanged team name. Also in 1921, A. E. Staley, the owner of the Decatur Staleys, sold the team to player-coach George Halas, who went on to become one of the most important figures in the first half century of the NFL. In 1921, Halas moved the team to Chicago, but retained the Staleys nickname. In 1922 the team was renamed the Chicago Bears. The Staleys won the 1921 AFPA Championship, over the Buffalo All-Americans in an event later referred to as the "Staley Swindle". The APFA was renamed National Football League on June 24, 1922.

By the mid-1920s, NFL membership had grown to 25 teams, and a rival league known as the American Football League was formed. The rival AFL folded after a single season, but it symbolized a growing interest in the professional game. Several college stars joined the NFL, most notably Red Grange from the University of Illinois, who was taken on a famous barnstorming tour in 1925 by the Chicago Bears. Another scandal that season centered on a 1925 game between the Chicago Cardinals and the Milwaukee Badgers. The scandal involved a Chicago player, Art Folz, hiring a group of high school football players to play for the Milwaukee Badgers, against the Cardinals. This would ensure an inferior opponent for Chicago. The game was used to help prop up their win–loss percentage and as a chance of wrestling away the 1925 Championship away from the first place Pottsville Maroons. All parties were severely punished initially; however, a few months later the punishments were rescinded. Also that year a controversial dispute stripped the NFL title from the Maroons and awarded it to the Cardinals.

The first evidence of women playing organized American football was in 1926, when the Frankford Yellow Jackets (the predecessors to the modern Philadelphia Eagles) employed women's teams for halftime entertainment.

==== 1932 NFL playoff game ====
The first ever National Football League playoff game was held indoors at Chicago Stadium on December 18, 1932.

At the end of the 1932 season, the Chicago Bears and the Portsmouth Spartans were tied with the best regular-season records. To determine the champion, the league voted to hold its first playoff game. Because of cold weather, the game was held indoors at Chicago Stadium, which forced some temporary rule changes. Chicago won, 9–0. The playoff proved so popular that the league reorganized into two divisions for the 1933 season, with the winners advancing to a scheduled championship game. A number of new rule changes were also instituted: the goal posts were moved forward to the goal line, every play started from between the hash marks, and forward passes could originate from anywhere behind the line of scrimmage (instead of the previous five yards behind).

== Early history of youth and high school football (1863–1932) ==
The 1863 games of the Oneida Football Club were the first high school football games to be played in the United States. Thirteen of the sixteen Oneida players attended Dixwell's Private Latin School, which was located near the Boston Common.

The oldest high school football rivalry in the United States is between Norwich Free Academy and New London High School. The first meeting between Norwich Free Academy and New London High School occurred on May 12, 1875. Wellesley High School and Needham High School began playing each other in 1882 in what is now the oldest football rivalry in the United States between public schools. In 1887, Boston Latin School and English High School began playing each other in what is now the oldest continuous football rivalry in the United States. Hyde Park Career Academy and Englewood Technical Prep Academy began playing each other for the Little Brown Shield in 1889. The "Bell Game" between Pueblo Central High School and Pueblo Centennial High School, which was first played in 1892, is noted as being the oldest high school football rivalry west of the Mississippi River.

American football came to Massillon, Ohio in 1894 with the first high school game between Massillon Washington High School and Canton Central High School. In the early years, the players consisted of working boys because most boys did not attend high school. By 1904 more boys began attending school past 8th grade. 1909 was Massillon's first undefeated football team. From 1910 to 1920 high school football in Massillon grew and improved, and by 1916 they were named the Scholastic Champions of Ohio. The school mascot, the Tiger, was adopted from the city's former professional football team known as the Massillon Tigers.

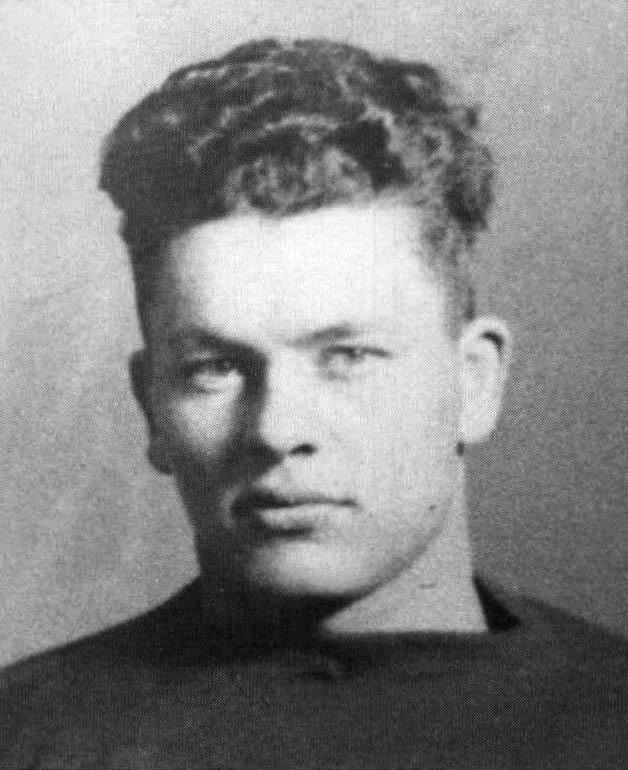
Lambeau at Notre Dame in 1918.

American football first came to Green Bay, Wisconsin when Green Bay East High School and Green Bay West High School began their rivalry in 1895. Future founder of the Green Bay Packers, Curly Lambeau, became the captain of East High School's football team as a senior in 1917 and later coached the team from 1919 to 1921. Early games occasionally had more fans than Packers games, who used to play at City Stadium. Other notable players include Arnie Herber and Jim Crowley.

== Early history of American football outside the United States (1874–1932) ==
The first American football game played outside of the United States was the October 23, 1874, game between McGill and Harvard played at Montreal Cricket Grounds. American football in Europe first began with the 1897 École des Beaux-Arts vs. Académie Julian football game. American football was first played in Cuba was on December 25, 1907, between LSU and the University of Havana. American football was held as a demonstration sport for the 1932 Summer Olympics.

== Similar codes of football ==
Other codes of football share a common history with American football. Canadian football is a form of the game that evolved parallel to American football, through its adoption of the Burnside rules in 1903. While both games share a common history and basic structure, there are some important differences between the two.

American football's parent sport of rugby continued to evolve. Today, two distinct codes known as rugby union and rugby league are played throughout the world. Since the two codes split following a schism on how the sport should be managed in 1895, the history of rugby league and the history of rugby union have evolved separately. Both codes have adopted innovations parallel to the American game; the rugby union scoring system is almost identical to the American game, while rugby league uses a gridiron-style field and a six-tackle rule similar to the system of downs in American Football.

== See also ==
- Modern history of American football
- American football rules
- Comparison of American football and rugby league
- Comparison of American football and rugby union
- Comparison of Canadian and American football
- Gridiron football
- History of association football
- History of rugby union
- History of the football helmet
- List of historically significant college football games
- List of the first college football game in each US state
- Timeline of college football in Kansas
- Black players in American professional football
- McGill University – Athletics The inventions of North American football, hockey, rugby and basketball are all related to McGill in some way. In 1865, the first recorded game of rugby in Canada (and North America) occurred in Montreal, between British army officers and McGill students.
