= 1888 Staten Island Cricket Club football team =

American college football season

1888 Staten Island Cricket Club football
- Conference: American Football Union
- Record: 0–5 (0–5 AFU)
- Captain: Harry Beecher (quarterback)
- Home stadium: Staten Island A. C. grounds

1888 American Football Union standings
	Conf.					Overall
Team	W		L		T	W		L		T
Crescent Athletic Club $	6	–	0	–	0	6	–	2	–	0
Orange Athletic Club	3	–	2	–	1	3	–	3	–	1
New York Athletic Club	1	–	3	–	1	1	–	3	–	1
Staten Island Cricket Club	0	–	5	–	0	0	–	5	–	0

The 1888 Staten Island Cricket Club football team was an American football team that represented the Staten Island Cricket Club in the American Football Union (AFU) during the 1888 college football season. The Staten Island team played its home games in Staten Island, New York, and compiled a 3–3–1 record (3–2–1 against AFU opponents).

The team was captained by Harry Beecher, a star quarterback and captain of the Yale Bulldogs in 1887, and a major proponent of their championship in the same year.

== Schedule ==
Date	Opponent	Site	Result	Attendance	Source
October 13	Orange Athletic Club	Staten Island A. C. grounds; Staten Island, NY	L 0–4	600	
October 20	Crescent Athletic Club	Staten Island A. C. grounds; Staten Island, NY	L 2–10	500–700	
October 27	New York Athletic Club	Polo Grounds; Manhattan, NY	L (forfeit)		
November 3	Orange Athletic Club	Staten Island A. C. grounds; Staten Island, NY	L 4–10		
November 10	Crescent Athletic Club	Washington Park; Brooklyn, NY	L (forfeit)		
November 17	New York Athletic Club	Staten Island A. C. grounds; Staten Island, NY	Unknown		

== Second team schedule ==
Date	Opponent	Site	Result	Source
November 3	Columbia Grammar School	Staten Island A. C. grounds; Staten Island, NY	L 0–21	

== See also ==
- 1887 Staten Island Cricket Club football team
