= 1887 Brooklyn Hill Football Club season =

American college football season

1887 Brooklyn Hills football
- Conference: Independent
- Head coach: William Halsey (2nd season)
- Captain: William Halsey (center rush)
- Home stadium: Parade Grounds, Prospect Park

The 1887 Brooklyn Hill football team was an American football team that represented the Brooklyn Hill Football Club. Despite not being part of the American Football Union any longer, the Hills were still able to play a competitive schedule and compiled record of at least 0–3 against collegiate and semi-professional opponents. In their match against the Polytechnic Institute in March, the Hills team and a congregation from the Adelphi Academy combined to play the Polys, but still lost 20 to 4.

== Schedule ==
Date	Time	Opponent	Site	Result	Source
March 12		Polytechnic Institute of Brooklyn	Parade Grounds, Prospect Park; Brooklyn, NY	L 4–20	
October 7	4:20 p.m.	at Crescent Athletic Club	Crescent Athletic Club grounds; Brooklyn, NY	L 0–29	
October 30	3:50 p.m.	at Princeton Freshmen	Washington Park; Brooklyn, NY	L 0–48	

== 1887 Brooklyn Heights Football Club schedule ==
Whether or not the Brooklyn Heights football club was a separate organization from the Brooklyn Hills team is unknown. There is some evidence though that points to the Heights team as being its own athletic club, and not just another way to describe the hills club, most notably the limited roster differences. Another solution is that the Brooklyn Heights team was a secondary squad for the more prominent Hills team, although no historical newspapers can substantiate this theory.

Date	Time	Opponent	Site	Result	Source
November 8	nearly 11:00 a.m.	Columbia Freshmen	Parade Grounds, Prospect Park; Brooklyn, NY	W 4–0	
November 26		Stevens Institute High School	Prospect Park; Brooklyn, NY	L 12–20	

== See also ==
- 1886 Brooklyn Hill Football Club season
