= 1887 Staten Island Cricket Club football team =

American college football season

1887 Staten Island Cricket Club football
- Conference: American Football Union
- Record: 1–3 (1–3 AFU)

1887 American Football Union standings
| | Conf. | | | | | Overall |
| Team | W | | L | | T | W | | L | | T |
|---|---|---|---|---|---|---|---|---|---|---|
| Crescent Athletic Club $ | 6 | – | 0 | – | 0 | 7 | – | 1 | – | 0 |
| New York Athletic Club | 2 | – | 2 | – | 0 | 1 | – | 2 | – | 0 |
| Staten Island Cricket Club | 1 | – | 3 | – | 0 | 1 | – | 3 | – | 0 |
| Unions of Columbia | 0 | – | 3 | – | 0 | 0 | – | 3 | – | 0 |

The 1887 Staten Island Cricket Club football team was an American football team that represented the Staten Island Cricket and Baseball club during the 1887 football season. In their first year as a member of the American Football Union, the Islanders compiled a 1–3 record (all in the AFU), and were outscored by their opponents by a total of 52 to 37.

== Schedule ==
| Date | Opponent | Site | Result | Attendance | Source |
|---|---|---|---|---|---|
| October 15 | Unions of Columbia | Staten Island Cricket grounds; Livingston, Staten Island, NY | W 30–2 | | |
| October 22 | New York Athletic Club | Staten Island Cricket grounds; Livingston, Staten Island, NY | L 6–10 | | |
| October 29 | Crescent Athletic Club | Staten Island Cricket grounds; Livingston, Staten Island, NY | L 1–16 | 600 | |
| November 12 | New York Athletic Club | Staten Island Cricket Ground; Livingston, Staten Island, NY | Cancelled | | |
| November 26 | Crescent Athletic Club | Crescent Athletic Club grounds; Brooklyn, NY | L 0–24 | | |

== See also ==
- 1888 Staten Island Cricket Club football team
