= 1888 Orange Athletic Club football team =

American college football season

1888 Orange Athletic Club football
- Conference: American Football Union
- Record: 3–3–1 (3–2–1 AFU)

1888 American Football Union standings
	Conf.					Overall
Team	W		L		T	W		L		T
Crescent Athletic Club $	6	–	0	–	0	6	–	2	–	0
Orange Athletic Club	3	–	2	–	1	3	–	3	–	1
New York Athletic Club	1	–	3	–	1	1	–	3	–	1
Staten Island Cricket Club	0	–	5	–	0	0	–	5	–	0

The 1888 Orange Athletic Club football team was an American football team that represented the Orange Athletic Club in the American Football Union (AFU) during the 1888 college football season. The Orange team played its home games in East Orange, New Jersey, and compiled a 3–3–1 record (3–2–1 against AFU opponents).

== Schedule ==
Date	Opponent	Site	Result
	Stevens*	East Orange, New Jersey	L 0–2
October 13	at Staten Island Cricket Club	Staten Island, NY	W 4–0
October 20	at New York Athletic Club	St. George Cricket grounds; Hoboken, NJ	T 12–12
October 27	at Crescent Athletic Club	Crescent Athletic grounds; Brooklyn, NY	L 6–34
November 3	at Staten Island Cricket Club	Staten Island, NY	W
November 6	New York Athletic Club	East Orange, New Jersey	W 16–4
November 29	at Crescent Athletic Club	Crescent Athletic grounds; Brooklyn, NY (Eagle Cup Championship Game)	L 0–25
*Non-conference game
