= The Union Club of Columbia football team =

College football season

The Union Club of Columbia football team was a short-lived football club composed of students and alumni of Columbia College, active from 1886 to 1887. It serves as the only school-related football team during this period, as Columbia’s varsity football program was on hiatus from 1885 to 1888. Little is known about the Union Club’s organization, its exact relationship to Columbia College, or the reasons behind its formation and eventual dissolution.

== 1886 season ==
1886 Unions of Columbia College football
- Conference: American Football Union
- Record: 1–3 (1–2 AFU)
- Captain: A. Cohen
- Home stadium: St. George Cricket Grounds

1886 American Football Union standings
	Conf.					Overall
Team	W		L		T	W		L		T
Crickets of Stevens Institute $	3	–	0	–	0	4	–	1	–	0
Staten Island Football Club	1	–	2	–	2	2	–	3	–	3
Unions of Columbia	1	–	2	–	0	1	–	3	–	0
Brooklyn Hill	0	–	1	–	2	3	–	5	–	3
Cutler School	0	–	0	–	0	–	–	–	–	–
Spartan Harriers	0	–	0	–	0	–	–	–	–	–

In 1886, the Unions of Columbia football club joined the newly formed American Football Union (AFU) for its inaugural season. The Unions compiled a 1–3 record, all against AFU opponents, and outscored their opponents by a total of 28 to 23. The AFU later ruled that a forfeit loss on November 6th between Brooklyn Hill and the Unions would not count toward the league standings. The 1886 team was composed primarily of Columbia College alumni, particularly former members of the 1883 and 1884 varsity squads.

Date	Opponent	Site	Result	Source
October 16	Staten Island Football Club	Staten Island, NY	W 22–0	
October 30	Crickets of Stevens Institute		Likely postponed	
November 2	Crickets of Stevens Institute	St. George Cricket Ground; Hoboken, NJ	L 6–13	
November 6	Brooklyn Hill	Crescent Athletic Club grounds; Brooklyn, NY	L (forfeit)	
November 20	Staten Island Football Club	St. George Cricket Grounds; Staten Island, NY	L 0–10	

== 1887 season ==
1887 Unions of Columbia College football
- Conference: American Football Union
- Record: 0–3 (0–3 AFU)
- Captain: A. Cohen

1887 American Football Union standings
	Conf.					Overall
Team	W		L		T	W		L		T
Crescent Athletic Club $	6	–	0	–	0	7	–	1	–	0
New York Athletic Club	2	–	2	–	0	1	–	2	–	0
Staten Island Cricket Club	1	–	3	–	0	1	–	3	–	0
Unions of Columbia	0	–	3	–	0	0	–	3	–	0

The 1887 Unions of Columbia College football team compiled a 0–3 record (all in the AFU) and were outscored by their opponents by a total of 63 to 2. Sometime in the middle of October, the team was able to secure new players when the Crickets of Stevens Institute (who had won the 1886 AFU championship) decided to consolidate their team with the Unions. On November 13, the Unions resigned from the AFU for an unstated reason, and disbanded their student alumni football team. Speculation at the time for the team's disbandment was blamed on the club "not being able to stand defeat". Another possibility was the alumni simply lost interest in the game, which was a common reason for dropping football at the time (this was the reason for Columbia's Varsity hiatus' in the 1880s and 1890s), or perhaps the most viable, the student sect of the Unions team was consolidated into the 1887 Columbia interclass teams, and there were two few alumni remaining to continue the season.

Date	Opponent	Site	Result	Source
October 15	Staten Island Cricket Club	Staten Island Cricket grounds; Livingston, Staten Island	L 2–30	
October 22	Crescent Athletic Club	Crescent Athletic Club grounds; Brooklyn, NY	L 0–27	
November 5	Staten Island Cricket Club	Crescent Athletic Club grounds; Brooklyn, NY	Likely Cancelled	
November 12	Crescent Athletic Club	Crescent Athletic Club grounds; Brooklyn, NY	L 0–6	

== 1888 season ==
1888 Unions of Columbia College football
- Conference: Independent
- Record: ~2–1
- Captain: Read G. Dilworth (quarterback and rusher)

1888 Eastern college football independents records
	Conf.			Overall
Team	W	L	T	W		L		T
Yale		–		13	–	0	–	0
Harvard		–		12	–	1	–	0
Princeton		–		11	–	1	–	0
Lehigh		–		10	–	2	–	0
Trinity (CT)		–		5	–	1	–	1
Lafayette		–		6	–	3	–	0
Cornell		–		4	–	2	–	0
Penn		–		9	–	7	–	0
Bucknell		–		2	–	3	–	0
Fordham		–		1	–	2	–	0
Massachusetts		–		2	–	4	–	0
Wesleyan		–		2	–	7	–	0
Worcester Tech		–		1	–	4	–	0
Rutgers		–		1	–	6	–	1
Penn State		–		0	–	2	–	1
Swarthmore		–		0	–	5	–	0

The Union Club football team was reformed for the 1888 season as an independent, compiled a 2–1 record (approximately), and were outscored by their opponents by a total of 38 to 6. The return of the Union Club is not well documented, but they seemed to now be mostly made up of Columbia students as opposed to alumni. With the Varsity of Columbia returning from hiatus in 1889, there was no longer a need for separate football clubs and interclass teams, and the Unions were disbanded permanently.

Date	Opponent	Site	Result	Source
October 27	Manhattan Athletic Club	Manhattan Athletic Club grounds; Manhattan, NY	W 4–0	
November 3	Consolidated team of Crescent Athletic Club	Crescent Athletic Club grounds; Brooklyn, NY	L 4–6	
December 8	Manhattan Athletic Club	Manhattan Athletic Club grounds; Manhattan, NY	W 30–0	

== Team rosters ==
In 1886, nearly all of the players in the Union Club were alumni or students of Columbia College. For the 1887 season, however, the Unions of Columbia roster would also include the Crickets of Stevens, which were another alumni football team that represented the Stevens Institute of Technology. Various members of other athletic clubs in the AFU also played a small part on the Union team. The following players were a member of the Unions of Columbia football team between 1886 and 1888. In 1888, restrictions from the new AFU constitution regarding fixed rosters slowed the influx or shifting of players of any club in the New York metropolitan area, and as such many of the Crickets or other players not affiliated with the college left the team. Any additional information regarding the player's history will follow their years and position with the Unions.

- C. Aldridge – 1887 Unions quarterback
- H. Anderson – 1888 Unions rusher
- J. Bacon – 1886 Unions fullback and rusher
- Francis Blossom – 1888 Unions center rush and right end; Columbia Varsity letterwinner 1889
- R. Bradley – 1888 Unions halfback and right tackle; 1888 Columbia sophomore team
- Charles K. Beekman – 1886 Unions rusher; rusher for 1887 Columbia Junior team; 1888 Unions left tackle; Columbia Varsity letterwinner 1889
- Caldway – 1887 Unions rusher
- A. Cohen, captain – 1886/1887 Unions rusher and halfback
- J. F. Congdon – 1888 Unions rusher
- J.Cooke – 1888 Unions rusher
- Cummings – 1886 Unions halfback
- DeWitt Weld? – 1888 Unions rusher (could be E. B. DeWitt, Columbia Varsity letterwinner 1882)
- J. Dilworth – 1888 Unions rusher and center rush (could be R. G. Dilworth, 1888 Unions quarterback)
- Read G. Dilworth – 1888 Unions quarterback (could be J. Dilworth, 1888 Unions rusher and center rush); Columbia Varsity letterwinner 1889–1890
- Dimock – 1886 Unions rusher
- Drummond – 1887 Unions rusher
- D. Edwards – 1887 Unions halfback; Princeton football alumni and Crescent Athletic Club halfback 1887?
- Field – 1887 Unions rusher (possibly Otis W. Field; Columbia Varsity letterwinner 1873)
- Gardiner – 1886 Unions halfback
- Alger C. Gildersleeve – 1888 Unions left end; 1888 Columbia Sophomore team; Columbia Varsity letterwinner and captain 1889
- A. Halstead – 1888 Unions rusher
- Howland – 1886 Unions rusher
- J. M. Hewlett, captain – 1888 Unions quarterback and halfback; 1888 Columbia Sophomore team captain; Columbia Varsity letterwinner and captain 1889
- Klapp – 1886 Unions rusher; captain and halfback of 1887 Columbia Junior team; 1888 Unions right guard
- J. Langthorne (Longthorn, Longthorne?) – 1888 Unions left guard
- Livermore – 1886 Unions rusher
- Benoni Lockwood – 1886 Unions halfback; Columbia Varsity letterwinner 1883
- E. Magee – 1887 Unions halfback
- G. M. Martin – 1888 Unions rusher
- R. A. Martin – 1888 Unions rusher
- G. S. Nicholas Jr. – 1888 Unions rusher
- C. O'Connor – 1888 Unions fullback
- S. D. Pierce – 1888 Unions quarterback; 1888 Columbia Sophomore team
- Provost – 1886 Unions quarterback; quarterback for 1887 Columbia Junior team
- Phelps – 1887 Unions rusher
- Richards – 1886 Unions rusher
- W. P. Robertson – 1888 Unions halfback and fullback; 1888 Columbia freshmen team
- Schuyler – 1886 Unions quarterback
- Sevenoake – 1887 Unions rusher; Crickets Athletic Club 1886–1887; Secretary and Treasurer of the AFU in 1887
- Sheldon – 1887 Unions rusher
- E. P. Smith – 1888 Unions rusher; Columbia Varsity letterwinner 1890
- H. Smith – 1886 Unions rusher
- T. Smith – 1886 Unions fullback
- Charles A. Stevens – 1886 Unions halfback; Columbia Varsity letterwinner 1883–1884 and 1884 captain;
- R. Stevens – 1886 Unions rusher
- Uhlenhaut – 1887 Unions fullback
- William Ward – 1886 Unions rusher; Columbia Varsity letterwinner 1874–1876; played on 1887 Crescent Athletic Club
- E. Winchet – 1887 Unions rusher
- E. Woodbridge – 1888 Unions rusher
