= 1886 Staten Island Football Club season =

American college football season

1886 Staten Island Football Club football
- Conference: American Football Union
- Record: 2–3–3 (1–2–2 AFU)
- Captain: C. A. MacDonald (halfback)
- Home stadium: St. George Cricket Grounds

1886 American Football Union standings
	Conf.					Overall
Team	W		L		T	W		L		T
Crickets of Stevens Institute $	3	–	0	–	0	4	–	1	–	0
Staten Island Football Club	1	–	2	–	2	2	–	3	–	3
Unions of Columbia	1	–	2	–	0	1	–	3	–	0
Brooklyn Hill	0	–	1	–	2	3	–	5	–	3
Cutler School	0	–	0	–	0	–	–	–	–	–
Spartan Harriers	0	–	0	–	0	–	–	–	–	–

The 1886 Staten Island Football Club football team was an American football team that represented four athletic clubs, the Staten Island Cricket, Rowing, and Athletic clubs, as well as the Clifton Athletic Club during the 1886 football season. The team compiled a record and played its home games at St. George Cricket Grounds in Hoboken, New Jersey. The Staten Islanders were able to comply with the AFU's system of playing any other league opponents twice, but were forced to disqualify their November 6 match with the Crickets as a conference win because of some controversial officiating.

== Schedule ==
Date	Opponent	Site	Result	Source
October 16	Unions of Columbia	St. George Cricket Grounds; Staten Island, NY	L 0–22	
October 23	Crickets of Stevens Institute	St. George Cricket Grounds?; Staten Island, NY	Unknown	
October 30	Brooklyn Hill	St. George Cricket Grounds; Staten Island, NY	T 6–6	
November 6	at Crickets of Stevens Institute*	Hoboken, NJ	W 10–4	
November 13	Brooklyn Hill	St. George Cricket Grounds; Staten Island, NY	T 0–0	
November 18	NYU*	St. George Cricket Grounds?; Staten Island, NY	T 4–4	
November 20	Unions of Columbia	St. George Cricket Grounds; Staten Island, NY	W 10–0	
November 27	Crescent Athletic Club*	Crescent Athletic Club grounds; Brooklyn, NY	L 0–16	
December 4	Crickets of Stevens Institute	St. George Cricket Grounds; Staten Island, NY	L 0–10	
*Non-conference game
