= 1887 Navy Midshipmen football team =

American college football season

1887 Navy Midshipmen football
- Conference: Independent
- Record: 3–1
- Head coach: None
- Offensive scheme: Modified V-formation
- Captain: George Hayward
- Home stadium: Western King Field

1887 Southern college football independents records
	Conf.			Overall
Team	W	L	T	W		L		T
Navy		–		3	–	1	–	0
Georgetown		–		2	–	1	–	0
Richmond		–		1	–	1	–	0
Virginia		–		0	–	0	–	1
Johns Hopkins		–		0	–	2	–	0

The 1887 Navy Midshipmen football team represented the United States Naval Academy during the 1887 college football season. The team compiled a 3–1 record and outscored its opponents 41 to 22. The Midshipmen shut out their first three opponents, including an 8–0 victory in the seventh installment of the Johns Hopkins–Navy football rivalry. The Johns Hopkins game was played at the Academy grounds in Annapolis, Maryland, and was described by The Sun (New York) as "a veritable slugging match" and "one of the roughest games of football" ever seen there. In the final game of the 1887 season, the Midshipmen lost to the Princeton Tigers "B" team in the final game of the season. The team captain was George Hayward.

== Schedule ==
Date	Opponent	Site	Result	Source
October 29	St. John's (MD)	Unknown; Annapolis, MD	W 4–0	
November 12	St. John's (MD)	Unknown; Annapolis, MD	W 24–0	
November 24	Johns Hopkins	Unknown; Annapolis, MD (rivalry)	W 8–0	
November 26	Princeton Reserves	Unknown; Annapolis, MD	L 5-22	

== Prelude ==
The Naval Academy's football program formally began in 1879 with a game against the Baltimore Athletic Club. The program went on a two-year hiatus in 1880 and 1881 due to a lack of support, before it was brought back by Vaulx Carter. Johns Hopkins was Navy's primary opponent during the 1880s; the annual contest between the programs made up the entirety of the academy's 1882 through 1884 seasons.

== Players ==
The 1887 Naval Academy football team was made up of twelve players at six unique positions. The squad consisted of five rushers, two ends, one snapback, one fullbacks, two halfbacks, and one quarterbacks. Four of the players (both halfbacks, the fullback, and a rusher) had played the previous season. The age of the players ranged several years due to the academy's admission policy; the school allowed for men between the ages of 14 and 18 to be admitted, which future player John B. Patton remarked made it "just a boys' school".

Rushers

- Carlo Brittain
- Ashley Robertson
- Sam Robinson
- Monty Taylor
- Curtis D. Wilbur

Ends

- Buell Franklin
- George Gibbs

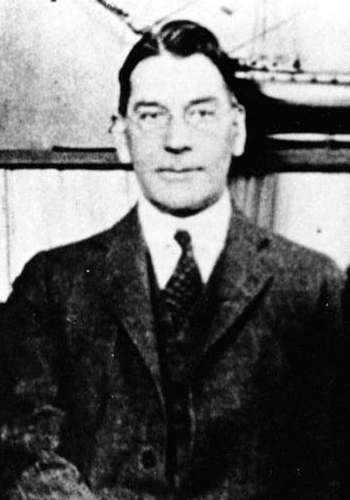
Curtis Dwight Wilbur, a rusher on the 1887 team, was later appointed Secretary of the Navy

Snapback

- George Fermier

Halfbacks

- George Hayward (capt.)
- John Patton

Full-backs

- Lou Anderson

Quarterbacks

- Jim Fearne
