= 1886 Brooklyn Hill Football Club season =

American college football season

1886 Brooklyn Hills football
- Conference: American Football Union
- Record: 3–5–3 (0–1–2 AFU)
- Head coach: William Halsey (1st season)
- Captain: William Halsey (halfback)
- Home stadium: Prospect Park, Crescent Athletic Club grounds

1886 American Football Union standings
	Conf.					Overall
Team	W		L		T	W		L		T
Crickets of Stevens Institute $	3	–	0	–	0	4	–	1	–	0
Staten Island Football Club	1	–	2	–	2	2	–	3	–	3
Unions of Columbia	1	–	2	–	0	1	–	3	–	0
Brooklyn Hill	0	–	1	–	2	3	–	5	–	3
Cutler School	0	–	0	–	0	–	–	–	–	–
Spartan Harriers	0	–	0	–	0	–	–	–	–	–

The 1886 Brooklyn Hills football team was an American football team that represented the Brooklyn Hill Football Club who had been playing football since at least the year prior, in the American Football Union during the 1886 football season. Coached and captained by William Halsey, notable halfback, captain, and secretary of the fledgling American Football Union, the Hills compiled a 3–5–3 (of games confirmed), and finished 0–1–2 in AFU play before resigning from the Union on November 16 due to a lack of league games scheduled for Saturday and an inability to complete the rest of their conference schedule. The Brooklyn Hills were also not allowed to claim their forfeit win against the Unions of Columbia, as an AFU meeting on the same day confirmed. It is unclear whether or not Brooklyn Hill claimed a win on October 16 against the Crickets of Stevens Institute, with the referee deferring to the AFU, who either never resolved the issue or did so quietly.

== Schedule ==
Date	Time	Opponent	Site	Result	Source
October 10		Crickets of Stevens Institute*	Parade Grounds, Prospect Park; Brooklyn, NY	L 6–22	
October 15		Polytechnic Institute of Brooklyn*	Parade Grounds, Prospect Park; Brooklyn, NY	T 0–0	
October 16	4:00 p.m.	Crickets of Stevens Institute	Parade Grounds, Prospect Park; Brooklyn, NY	L 6–8 (10–8 disputed)	
October 23		Crescent Athletic Club*	Crescent Athletic Club grounds; Brooklyn, NY	L 0–20	
October 30		Staten Island Football Club	St. George Cricket Grounds; Staten Island, NY	T 6–6	
November 4		Polytechnic Institute of Brooklyn*	Washington Park; New York City, NY	W 28–0	
November 6		Unions of Columbia*	Crescent Athletic Club grounds; Brooklyn, NY	W (forfeit)	
November 6	3:40 p.m.	Yale Freshmen*	Crescent Athletic Club grounds; Brooklyn, NY	L 0–18	
November 11		at Hasbrouck Institute*	Jersey City Baseball grounds; Jersey City, NJ	W 14–0	
November 13		at Staten Island Football Club	St. George Cricket Grounds; Staten Island, NY	T 0–0	
November 20		at Princeton Freshmen*	Princeton, NJ	L 11–66 or 11–68	
November 27		Amherst*	Crescent Athletic Club grounds; Brooklyn, NY	Proposed	
		Yale Freshmen		Proposed	
*Non-conference game

== See also ==
- 1887 Brooklyn Hill Football Club season
