= 1889 Crescent Athletic Club football team =

American college football season

1889 Crescent Athletic Club football
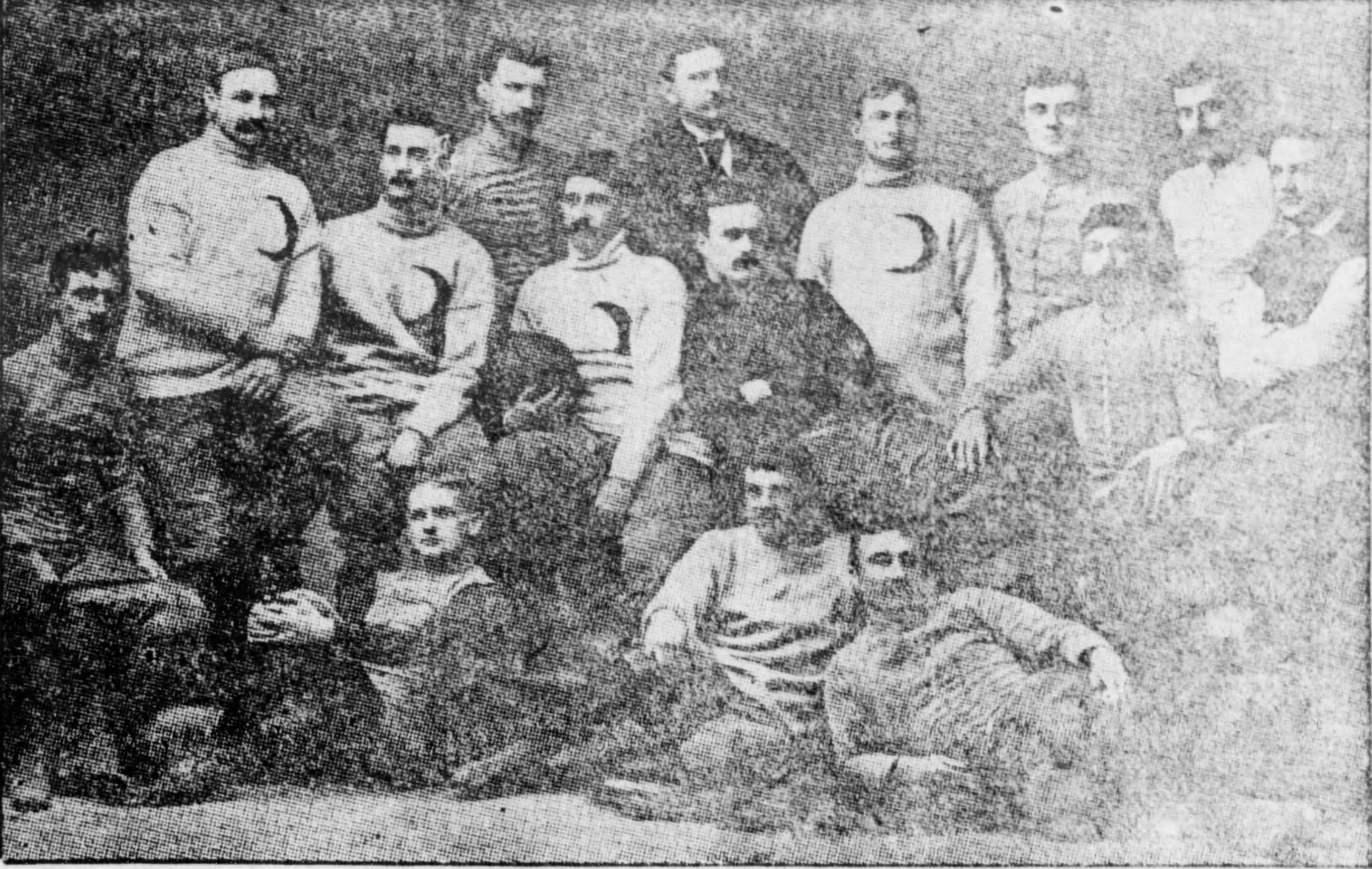

AFU champion
- Conference: American Football Union
- Record: 6–1 (4–0 AFU)
- Captain: William H. Ford
- Home stadium: Washington Park

1889 American Football Union standings
	Conf.					Overall
Team	W		L		T	W		L		T
Crescent Athletic Club $	4	–	0	–	0	6	–	1	–	0
Orange Athletic Club	3	–	2	–	0	6	–	3	–	0
New York Athletic Club	1	–	4	–	0	4	–	5	–	0
Staten Island Athletic Club	0	–	5	–	0	0	–	5	–	0

The 1889 Crescent Athletic Club football team was an American football team that represented the Crescent Athletic Club in the American Football Union (AFU) during the 1889 college football season. The team compiled a 6–1 record (4–0 against AFU opponents), won the AFU championship, and played its home games at Washington Park in Brooklyn. William H. Ford was the team captain. Other key players included Harry Beecher at quarterback, Wyllys Terry at halfback, and Henry J. Lamarche at guard. Alex Moffatt has also been reported as a member of the team.

Prior to the start of the season, the Crescent Club merged with the Nereid Boat Club which, according to Allison Danzig, "placed the Crescents in the very front rank of athletic organizations of similar character."

== Schedule ==
Date	Opponent	Site	Result	Attendance	Source
September 27	at Bedford and Prospect Park Football Clubs (practice) *	Prospect Park; Brooklyn, NY	W 23–0		
October 5	vs. Columbia*	Erastina grounds; Staten Island, NY	W 30–0		
October 12	New York Athletic Club	Washington Park; Brooklyn, NY	W 36–0		
October 19	at Staten Island Athletic Club	West New Brighton, Staten Island	W 44–0		
October 26	Orange Athletic Club	Grove Street grounds; East Orange, NJ	W 22–0		
November 5	Yale*	Washington Park; Brooklyn, NY	L 0–18	4,000	
November 9	Staten Island Athletic Club*	Washington Park; Brooklyn, NY	W 78–0		
November 16	Orange Athletic Club	Washington Park; Brooklyn, NY	W 6–0	300	
*Non-conference game

== Roster ==
- Harry Beecher
- Hunter Brown
- Billy Bull
- Charlie Chapman
- Duncan Edwards
- Billy Ford
- Henry J. Lamarche
- John Lamarche
- Mat. Lamarche
- Paul Lamarche
- Harry Sheldon
- Wyllys Terry
- Fred Vernon
- Joe Vernon
- Frank Lawrence, manager
