= 1887 New York Athletic Club football team =

American college football season

1887 New York Athletic Club football
- Conference: American Football Union
- Record: 2–2 (1–2 AFU)
- Captain: W. J. M. Barry (fullback)
- Home stadium: Polo Grounds

1887 American Football Union standings
	Conf.					Overall
Team	W		L		T	W		L		T
Crescent Athletic Club $	6	–	0	–	0	7	–	1	–	0
New York Athletic Club	2	–	2	–	0	1	–	2	–	0
Staten Island Cricket Club	1	–	3	–	0	1	–	3	–	0
Unions of Columbia	0	–	3	–	0	0	–	3	–	0

The 1887 New York Athletic Club football team was an American football team that represented the New York Athletic Club in their inaugural season with the American Football Union. The team compiled a 2–2 record (1–2 in the AFU) and were outscored by their opponents by a total of 24 to 18.

== Schedule ==
Date	Time	Opponent	Site	Result	Attendance	Source
October 22		at Staten Island Cricket Club	Staten Island Cricket Ground; Staten Island, NY	W 10–6		
October 29?		Olympic Athletic Club*	Polo Grounds; New York, NY	W 8–6		
November 5	3:00 p.m.	Crescent Athletic Club	Polo Grounds; New York, NY	L 0–6	1,000	
November 12		at Staten Island Cricket Club	Staten Island Cricket Ground; Staten Island, NY	Cancelled		
November 12		Crescent Athletic Club	Polo Grounds; New York, NY	L 0–6		
November 26		at Olympic Athletic Club*	Manhattan Athletic Club Ground; New York, NY	Cancelled		
*Non-conference game; All times are in Eastern time
