= 1888 New York Athletic Club football team =

American college football season

1888 New York Athletic Club football
- Conference: American Football Union
- Record: 1–3–1 (1–3–1 AFU)

1888 American Football Union standings
	Conf.					Overall
Team	W		L		T	W		L		T
Crescent Athletic Club $	6	–	0	–	0	6	–	2	–	0
Orange Athletic Club	3	–	2	–	1	3	–	3	–	1
New York Athletic Club	1	–	3	–	1	1	–	3	–	1
Staten Island Cricket Club	0	–	5	–	0	0	–	5	–	0

The 1888 New York Athletic Club football team was an American football team that represented the New York Athletic Club in the American Football Union (AFU) during the 1888 college football season. The New York team compiled a 1–3–1 record (all against AFU opponents).

== Schedule ==
Date	Opponent	Site	Result	Source
October 13	Crescent Athletic Club		L 0–52	
October 20	Orange Athletic Club	St. George Cricket grounds; Hoboken, NJ	T 12–12	
October 27	Staten Island Cricket Club	Polo Grounds; Manhattan, NY	W (forfeit)	
November 3	Crescent Athletic Club	Polo Grounds; Manhattan, NY	L 0–30	
November 6	Orange Athletic Club	Orange Oval; East Orange, New Jersey	L 4–16	
November 17	Staten Island Cricket Club	Staten Island A. C. grounds; Staten Island, NY	Likely Cancelled	
