= 1887 Crescent Athletic Club football team =

American college football season

1887 Crescent Athletic Club football

AFU champion
- Conference: American Football Union
- Record: 8–1 (6–0 AFU)
- Captain: W. H. Ford
- Home stadium: Crescent Athletic Club grounds

1887 American Football Union standings
	Conf.					Overall
Team	W		L		T	W		L		T
Crescent Athletic Club $	6	–	0	–	0	7	–	1	–	0
New York Athletic Club	2	–	2	–	0	1	–	2	–	0
Staten Island Cricket Club	1	–	3	–	0	1	–	3	–	0
Unions of Columbia	0	–	3	–	0	0	–	3	–	0

The 1887 Crescent Athletic Club football team represented the Crescent Athletic Club during the 1887 college football season. This season marked Crescent's first as a member of the American Football Union (AFU). The team achieved an 8–1 record (6–0 against AFU opponents), won the AFU championship, and played its home games at the Crescent Athletic Club grounds located at Ninth Avenue and Ninth Street in Brooklyn. W. H. Ford served as the team captain and center rush.

In October 1887, The Brooklyn Daily Eagle described the club's origins and purpose: "The Crescent Club was formed not for the purpose of turning out celebrated athletes and winning prizes, but simply to provide exercise and recreation for its members. . . . The club is composed almost entirely of young men who are engaged in business and have not much time to devote to athletics, and the policy has always been to make it an inexpensive organization and to give the members as much for their money as possible."

== Schedule ==
Date	Opponent	Site	Result	Attendance	Source
October 7	Brooklyn Hill*	Crescent grounds; Brooklyn, NY	W 29–0		
October 22	Union Club of Columbia	Crescent grounds; Brooklyn, NY	W 27–0		
October 29	at Staten Island Cricket Club	Livingston, Staten Island, NY	W 16–1	> 600	
November 5	at New York Athletic Club	Polo Grounds; New York, NY	W 6–0	1,000	
November 8	vs. Yale*	Polo Grounds; New York, NY	L 0–70		
November 12	Union Club of Columbia	Polo Grounds; New York, NY	W 6–0		
November 12	at New York Athletic Club	Polo Grounds; New York, NY	W 6–0		
November 26	Staten Island Cricket Club	Crescent grounds; Brooklyn, NY	W 24–0		
December 17	Alcyone*	Crescent grounds; Brooklyn, NY	W 32–0		
*Non-conference game
