= 1889 New York Athletic Club football team =

American college football season

1889 New York Athletic Club football
- Conference: American Football Union
- Record: 4–5 (1–4 AFU)
- Captain: Lawson
- Home stadium: Polo Grounds

1889 American Football Union standings
	Conf.					Overall
Team	W		L		T	W		L		T
Crescent Athletic Club $	4	–	0	–	0	6	–	1	–	0
Orange Athletic Club	3	–	2	–	0	6	–	3	–	0
New York Athletic Club	1	–	4	–	0	4	–	5	–	0
Staten Island Athletic Club	0	–	5	–	0	0	–	5	–	0

The 1889 New York Athletic Club football team was an American football team that represented the New York Athletic Club in the American Football Union (AFU) during the 1889 college football season. The team played its home games at the Polo Grounds in Manhattan, compiled a 4–5 record (1–4 against AFU opponents), and shut out two opponents. The New York team was not always able to employ eleven men on the field, forced to place with ten, nine, or even eight men on account of shortages in available members throughout the season.

== Schedule ==
Date	Time	Opponent	Site	Result	Attendance	Source
October 2	4:00 p.m.	Columbia*	Erastina grounds; Staten Island, NY?	Cancelled		
October 12		at Crescent Athletic Club	Washington Park; Brooklyn, NY	L 0–36		
October 19		Orange Athletic Club	Polo Grounds; Manhattan, NY	L 0–10		
October 26		Staten Island Athletic Club	West-Brighton, Staten Island, NY	W (forfeit)		
November 2		Crescent Athletic Club	Polo Grounds; Manhattan, NY	L 0–48	28	
November 5		American Athletic Club*	Polo Grounds; Manhattan, NY	W 24–0		
November 9		at Orange Athletic Club	East Orange, NJ	Postponed		
November 16		Staten Island Athletic Club*	Polo Grounds; Manhattan, NY	W 24–0		
November 23		Manhattan Athletic Club*	Polo Grounds; Manhattan, NY	W 10–4		
November 27	11:10 a.m.	Manhattan Athletic Club*	Polo Grounds; Manhattan, NY	L 4–10	200	
November 30	4:00 p.m.	at Orange Athletic Club	Grove Street grounds; East Orange, NJ	L 0–10	500	
*Non-conference game
