= 1889 Staten Island Athletic Club football team =

American college football season

1889 Staten Island Athletic Club football
- Conference: American Football Union
- Record: 0–6 (0–3 AFU)
- Captain: Redmond Conyngham (Conningham?)

1889 American Football Union standings
	Conf.					Overall
Team	W		L		T	W		L		T
Crescent Athletic Club $	4	–	0	–	0	6	–	1	–	0
Orange Athletic Club	3	–	2	–	0	6	–	3	–	0
New York Athletic Club	1	–	4	–	0	4	–	5	–	0
Staten Island Athletic Club	0	–	5	–	0	0	–	5	–	0

The 1889 Staten Island Athletic Club football team was an American football team that represented the Staten Island Athletic Club of West Brighton, which was likely a different organization than the Staten Island Cricket Club, in the American Football Union (AFU) during the 1889 college football season. The athletic club originally played on a pre-determined AFU schedule, but after its resignation from the league on November 1, the remaining games were no longer mandatory. However, they still continued to play league opponents for the remainder of the season, sticking to the original schedule to not disarrange the schedule for the rest of the schools in the union. The team finished its season with a 0–6 record (0–3 in the AFU), and did not score a single point against another opponent, losing by a total of 232 to 0.

== Schedule ==
Date	Opponent	Site	Result	Source
October 12	Orange Athletic Club	West New-Brighton, Staten Island, NY	L 0–24	
October 19	Crescent Athletic Club	West New-Brighton, Staten Island, NY	L 0–44	
October 26	New York Athletic Club	West New-Brighton, Staten Island, NY	L (forfeit)	
November 2	at Orange Athletic Club*	Grove street grounds; East Orange, NJ	L 0–62	
November 9	at Crescent Athletic Club*	Washington Park; Brooklyn, NY	L 0–78	
November 16	at New York Athletic Club*	Polo Grounds; Manhattan, NY	L 0–24	
*Non-conference game
