= 1889 Orange Athletic Club football team =

American college football season

1889 Orange Athletic Club football
- Conference: American Football Union
- Record: 6–3 (3–2 AFU)
- Home stadium: Grove Street grounds

1889 American Football Union standings
	Conf.					Overall
Team	W		L		T	W		L		T
Crescent Athletic Club $	4	–	0	–	0	6	–	1	–	0
Orange Athletic Club	3	–	2	–	0	6	–	3	–	0
New York Athletic Club	1	–	4	–	0	4	–	5	–	0
Staten Island Athletic Club	0	–	5	–	0	0	–	5	–	0

The 1889 Orange Athletic Club football team was an American football team that represented the Orange Athletic Club in the American Football Union (AFU) during the 1889 college football season. The team played its home games at the Grove Street grounds in East Orange, New Jersey, and compiled a 6–3 record.

== Schedule ==
Date	Opponent	Site	Result	Attendance	Source
October	Stevens*		W 6–0		
October 12	at Staten Island Athletic Club	West New Brighton, Staten Island	W 24–0		
October 19	at New York Athletic Club	Polo Grounds; New York, NY	W 10–0		
October 26	Crescent Athletic Club	Grove Street grounds; East Orange, NJ	L 0–22		
November 2	Staten Island Athletic Club*	Grove Street grounds; East Orange, NJ	W 62–0		
November 5	Flushing Athletic Club*	Grove Street grounds; East Orange, NJ	W 12–0	800	
November 9	New York Athletic Club	Grove Street grounds; East Orange, NJ	Postponed by rain		
November 16	at Crescent Athletic Club	Washington Park; Brooklyn, NY	L 0–6	300	
November 23	at Princeton*	Princeton, NJ	L 6–54		
November 30	New York Athletic Club	Grove Street grounds; East Orange, NJ	W 10–0	500	
*Non-conference game
