= Frank W. Durkee =

American football player/coach and professor

Biographical details
- Born: October 5, 1861; North Tunbridge, Vermont, U.S.
- Died: May 21, 1939 (aged 77); Medford, Massachusetts, U.S.

Playing career

Football
- 1887: Tufts

Baseball
- 1888: Tufts

Coaching career (HC unless noted)

Football
- 1887: Tufts

Head coaching record
- Overall: 4–6

Frank Williams Durkee (October 5, 1861 – May 21, 1939) was an American college football player and coach and chemistry professor. He served as a player-coach at Tufts University in Medford, Massachusetts, in 1887, compiling a record of 4–6. He was also a team captain on the school's baseball team in 1888.

Durkee was a member of the faculty at Tufts for 50 years, and was head of the chemistry department. He died of a heart attack on May 21, 1939, at his home in Medford.

== Head coaching record ==
Year	Team	Overall	Conference	Standing	Bowl/playoffs
Tufts Jumbos (Independent) (1887)
1887	Tufts	4–6			
Tufts:		4–6			
Total:		4–6			
