= 1887 Penn Quakers football team =

American college football season

1887 Penn Quakers football
- Conference: Independent
- Record: 6–7
- Head coach: Frank Dole (3rd season)
- Home stadium: University Athletic Grounds

1887 Eastern college football independents records
	Conf.			Overall
Team	W	L	T	W		L		T
Yale		–		9	–	0	–	0
Penn State		–		2	–	0	–	0
Harvard		–		10	–	1	–	0
Lafayette		–		7	–	2	–	0
Princeton		–		7	–	2	–	0
Lehigh		–		4	–	3	–	0
Williams		–		3	–	3	–	0
Penn		–		6	–	7	–	0
Wesleyan		–		4	–	5	–	0
Tufts		–		4	–	6	–	0
Massachusetts		–		2	–	3	–	0
Rutgers		–		2	–	6	–	0
Bucknell		–		0	–	2	–	0
Cornell		–		0	–	2	–	0
Franklin & Marshall		–		0	–	2	–	0
Vermont		–		0	–	2	–	0

The 1887 Penn Quakers football team was an American football team that represented the University of Pennsylvania as an independent during the 1887 college football season. In its third and final year under head coach Frank Dole, the team compiled a 6–7 record. Penn lost five games to the Big Three (Princeton, Harvard, and Yale) by a combined score of 286 to 0.

== Schedule ==
Date	Time	Opponent	Site	Result	Attendance	Source
October 8	3:45 p.m.	Graduates	University Athletic Grounds; Philadelphia, PA	W 14–6		
October 12	3:50 p.m.	Tioga Athletic Association	University Athletic Grounds; Philadelphia, PA	W 46–0		
October 15		Graduates	University Athletic Grounds; Philadelphia, PA	W 16–0		
October 19		Princeton	University Athletic Grounds; Philadelphia, PA (rivalry)	L 0–57	3,000	
October 22		at Princeton	University Field; Princeton, NJ	L 0–42		
October 29		Yale	University Athletic Grounds; Philadelphia, PA	L 0–50		
November 2	3:25 p.m.	at Rutgers	New Brunswick, NJ	W 13–10		
November 5	3:15 p.m.	Princeton	University Athletic Grounds; Philadelphia, PA	L 0–95		
November 9	3:00 p.m.	Haverford	University Athletic Grounds; Philadelphia, PA	W 36–0		
November 12		Lehigh	Philadelphia, PA	W 6–4		
November 16	3:00 p.m.	Lafayette	University Athletic Grounds; Philadelphia, PA	L 0–20		
November 19		at Harvard	Jarvis Field; Cambridge, MA (rivalry)	L 0–42	500	
November 24	10:00 a.m.	vs. Wesleyan	Polo Grounds; New York, NY	L 4–10		
