= 1887 Williams Ephs football team =

American college football season

1887 Williams Ephs football
- Conference: Independent
- Record: 3–3
- Head coach: None
- Captain: Edward Meade Belden
- Home stadium: Weston Field

1887 Eastern college football independents records
	Conf.			Overall
Team	W	L	T	W		L		T
Yale		–		9	–	0	–	0
Penn State		–		2	–	0	–	0
Harvard		–		10	–	1	–	0
Lafayette		–		7	–	2	–	0
Princeton		–		7	–	2	–	0
Lehigh		–		4	–	3	–	0
Williams		–		3	–	3	–	0
Penn		–		6	–	7	–	0
Wesleyan		–		4	–	5	–	0
Tufts		–		4	–	6	–	0
Massachusetts		–		2	–	3	–	0
Rutgers		–		2	–	6	–	0
Bucknell		–		0	–	2	–	0
Cornell		–		0	–	2	–	0
Franklin & Marshall		–		0	–	2	–	0
Vermont		–		0	–	2	–	0

The 1887 Williams Ephs football team represented the Williams College as an independent during the 1887 college football season. Williams compiled a record of 3–3. The team played home games at Weston Field in Williamstown, Massachusetts.

== Schedule ==
Date	Time	Opponent	Site	Result	Source
October 8		at Amherst	Amherst, MA (rivalry)	W 54–0	
October 19		at Harvard	Jarvis Field; Boston, MA	L 6–52	
October 22	1:00 p.m.	Yale	Weston Field; Williamstown, MA	L 0–74	
October 25		vs. Wesleyan	Ward Street grounds; Hartford, CT	L 6–18	
October 29	3:35 p.m.	Rutgers	Williamstown, MA	W 12–6	
November 5		Union (NY)	Weston Field; Williamstown, MA	W 94–0	
