= 1887 Bucknell football team =

American college football season

1887 Bucknell football
- Conference: Independent
- Record: 0–2
- Head coach: None
- Captain: H. Hanson

1887 Eastern college football independents records
	Conf.			Overall
Team	W	L	T	W		L		T
Yale		–		9	–	0	–	0
Penn State		–		2	–	0	–	0
Harvard		–		10	–	1	–	0
Lafayette		–		7	–	2	–	0
Princeton		–		7	–	2	–	0
Lehigh		–		4	–	3	–	0
Williams		–		3	–	3	–	0
Penn		–		6	–	7	–	0
Wesleyan		–		4	–	5	–	0
Tufts		–		4	–	6	–	0
Massachusetts		–		2	–	3	–	0
Rutgers		–		2	–	6	–	0
Bucknell		–		0	–	2	–	0
Cornell		–		0	–	2	–	0
Franklin & Marshall		–		0	–	2	–	0
Vermont		–		0	–	2	–	0

The 1887 Bucknell football team represented the Bucknell University during the 1887 college football season. Bucknell played in two games, losing both to Penn State. They did not score a single point in the season. The team had no head coach and the captain was H. Hanson.

== Schedule ==
Date	Time	Opponent	Site	Result	Source
November 12	9:30 a.m.	Penn State	Bucknell campus; Lewisburg, PA	L 0–54	
November 19		at Penn State	State College, PA	L 0–24	
