= 1887 Rutgers Queensmen football team =

American college football season

1887 Rutgers Queensmen football
- Conference: Independent
- Record: 2–6
- Head coach: None
- Captain: Clarence G. Scudder
- Home stadium: College Field

1887 Eastern college football independents records
	Conf.			Overall
Team	W	L	T	W		L		T
Yale		–		9	–	0	–	0
Penn State		–		2	–	0	–	0
Harvard		–		10	–	1	–	0
Lafayette		–		7	–	2	–	0
Princeton		–		7	–	2	–	0
Lehigh		–		4	–	3	–	0
Williams		–		3	–	3	–	0
Penn		–		6	–	7	–	0
Wesleyan		–		4	–	5	–	0
Tufts		–		4	–	6	–	0
Massachusetts		–		2	–	3	–	0
Rutgers		–		2	–	6	–	0
Bucknell		–		0	–	2	–	0
Cornell		–		0	–	2	–	0
Franklin & Marshall		–		0	–	2	–	0
Vermont		–		0	–	2	–	0

The 1887 Rutgers Queensmen football team represented Rutgers University as an independent during the 1887 college football season. The Queensmen compiled a 2–6 record and were outscored their opponents, 187 to 81. The team had no coach, and its captain was Clarence G. Scudder.

== Schedule ==
Date	Time	Opponent	Site	Result	Attendance	Source
October 8		Stevens	New Brunswick, NJ	W 26–0		
October 12		Princeton	New Brunswick, NJ (rivalry)	L 0–30	1,500	
October 15		at Lafayette	The Quad; Easton, PA	L 0–20		
October 19		at Stevens	Hoboken, NJ	W 5–2		
October 29	3:35 p.m.	at Williams	Williamstown, MA	L 6–12		
November 2	3:25 p.m.	Penn	New Brunswick, NJ	L 10–13		
November 5		at Yale	Yale Field; New Haven, CT	L 0–74		
November 12		Lafayette	New Brunswick, NJ	L 0–36		
