= 1887 Vermont Green and Gold football team =

American college football season

1887 Vermont Green and Gold football
- Conference: Independent
- Record: 0–2
- Head coach: None

1887 Eastern college football independents records
| | Conf. | | | Overall |
| Team | W | L | T | W | | L | | T |
|---|---|---|---|---|---|---|---|---|
| Yale | | – | | 9 | – | 0 | – | 0 |
| Penn State | | – | | 2 | – | 0 | – | 0 |
| Harvard | | – | | 10 | – | 1 | – | 0 |
| Lafayette | | – | | 7 | – | 2 | – | 0 |
| Princeton | | – | | 7 | – | 2 | – | 0 |
| Lehigh | | – | | 4 | – | 3 | – | 0 |
| Williams | | – | | 3 | – | 3 | – | 0 |
| Penn | | – | | 6 | – | 7 | – | 0 |
| Wesleyan | | – | | 4 | – | 5 | – | 0 |
| Tufts | | – | | 4 | – | 6 | – | 0 |
| Massachusetts | | – | | 2 | – | 3 | – | 0 |
| Rutgers | | – | | 2 | – | 6 | – | 0 |
| Bucknell | | – | | 0 | – | 2 | – | 0 |
| Cornell | | – | | 0 | – | 2 | – | 0 |
| Franklin & Marshall | | – | | 0 | – | 2 | – | 0 |
| Vermont | | – | | 0 | – | 2 | – | 0 |

The 1887 Vermont Green and Gold football team represented the University of Vermont during the 1887 college football season. The Green and Gold finished the season with an 0–2 record.

== Schedule ==
| Date | Time | Opponent | Site | Result | Source |
|---|---|---|---|---|---|
| November 2 | | at Boston University | Union Grounds; Boston, MA | L 0–38 | |
| November 3 | 3:00 p.m. | at Tufts | College Hill; Medford, MA | L 6–28 | |
