= 1888 Crescent Athletic Club football team =

American college football season

1888 Crescent Athletic Club football

AFU champion
- Conference: American Football Union
- Record: 6–2 (6–0 AFU)
- Captain: W. Ford
- Home stadium: Crescent Athletic grounds

1888 American Football Union standings
	Conf.					Overall
Team	W		L		T	W		L		T
Crescent Athletic Club $	6	–	0	–	0	6	–	2	–	0
Orange Athletic Club	3	–	2	–	1	3	–	3	–	1
New York Athletic Club	1	–	3	–	1	1	–	3	–	1
Staten Island Cricket Club	0	–	5	–	0	0	–	5	–	0

The 1888 Crescent Athletic Club football team was an American football team that represented the Crescent Athletic Club in the American Football Union (AFU) during the 1888 college football season. The team compiled a 6–2 record (6–0 against AFU opponents), won the AFU championship, and played its home games at Crescent Athletic Club grounds in Brooklyn.

== Schedule ==
Date	Opponent	Site	Result	Attendance	Source
October 6	Princeton*	Staten Island A.C. Grounds; Staten Island, NY	L 0–31		
October 13	New York Athletic Club	Crescent Athletic Grounds; Staten Island, NY	W 52–0		
October 20	Staten Island Cricket Club	Staten Island A.C. Grounds; Staten Island, NY	W 10–2	700	
October 27	Orange Athletic Club	Crescent Athletic Club grounds; Brooklyn, NY	W 34–6		
November 3	at New York Athletic Club	Polo Grounds; New York, NY	W 30–0		
November 6	Yale*	Washington Park; Brooklyn, NY	L 0–28		
November 10	Staten Island Cricket Club		W (forfeit)		
November 29	Orange Athletic Club	Polo Grounds; New York, NY	W 25–0		
*Non-conference game

== Consolidated team schedule ==
The consolidated team of the Crescent Athletic Club was also known as the Brooklyn Football Club, and played as such in their contests against the Alerts of New York on October 20 and the October 27 match against Flushing Athletic Club.

Date	Opponent	Site	Result	Source
October 6	Alerts of New York	Crescent Athletic grounds?; Brooklyn, NY?	W (forfeit)	
October 12 or 14	Bedford Athletic Club	Crescent Athletic grounds; Brooklyn, NY		
October 20	Alerts of New York	Crescent Athletic grounds; Brooklyn, NY	W 18–0	
October 27	at Flushing Athletic Club	Flushing grounds; Flushing, Queens	W 6–0	
November 3	Unions of Columbia College	Crescent Athletic Club grounds; Brooklyn, NY	W 6–4	
November 6	Flushing Athletic Club	Flushing grounds; Flushing, Queens	W 12–0	
