= 1887 Lafayette football team =

American college football season

1887 Lafayette football
- Conference: Independent
- Record: 7–2
- Head coach: None
- Captain: Frederick Paye

1887 Eastern college football independents records
	Conf.			Overall
Team	W	L	T	W		L		T
Yale		–		9	–	0	–	0
Penn State		–		2	–	0	–	0
Harvard		–		10	–	1	–	0
Lafayette		–		7	–	2	–	0
Princeton		–		7	–	2	–	0
Lehigh		–		4	–	3	–	0
Williams		–		3	–	3	–	0
Penn		–		6	–	7	–	0
Wesleyan		–		4	–	5	–	0
Tufts		–		4	–	6	–	0
Massachusetts		–		2	–	3	–	0
Rutgers		–		2	–	6	–	0
Bucknell		–		0	–	2	–	0
Cornell		–		0	–	2	–	0
Franklin & Marshall		–		0	–	2	–	0
Vermont		–		0	–	2	–	0

The 1887 Lafayette football team was an American football team that represented Lafayette College as an independent during the 1887 college football season. Playing without a regular coach, the team compiled a 7–2 record and outscored opponents by a total of 141 to 67. Frederick Paye was the team captain, and H. Martin was the manager. The team played its home games on The Quad in Easton, Pennsylvania.

== Schedule ==
Date	Time	Opponent	Site	Result	Source
October 8		at Princeton	University Field; Princeton, NJ	L 0–47	
October 12		at Dickinson	Carlisle, PA	W 12–0	
October 15		Rutgers	The Quad; Easton, PA	W 20–0	
October 19		Haverford	The Quad; Easton, PA	W 12–4	
October 22		Swarthmore	The Quad; Easton, PA	W 31–6	
October 29		at Lehigh	Bethlehem, PA (rivalry)	L 4–10	
November 12		at Rutgers	New Brunswick, NJ	W 36–0	
November 16	3:00 p.m.	at Penn	University Athletic Grounds; Philadelphia, PA	W 20–0	
November 23		Lehigh	The Quad; Easton, PA	W 6–0	
