= Netherland (novel) =

Novel by Joseph O'Neill

- First edition cover
- Author: Joseph O'Neill
- Language: English
- Genre: Novel
- Publisher: Harper Perennial
- Publication date: 20 May 2008
- Media type: Print
- Pages: 340 pp
- ISBN: 978-0-00-727570-0
- OCLC: 263294099
- Preceded by: The Breezes

Netherland (2008) is a novel by Joseph O'Neill. It concerns the life of a Dutchman living in New York in the wake of the September 11 attacks who takes up cricket and starts playing at the Staten Island Cricket Club.

== Plot summary ==
Netherland opens on protagonist Hans van den Broek, a Dutch financial analyst living in London with his English wife Rachel, but quickly flashes back to the years Hans spent in New York City before and in the immediate aftermath of 9/11. The novel opens as Hans is interviewed by a New York reporter over the death of his friend Khamraj Ramkisson. Hans prepares to return to Manhattan for the funeral of his estranged friend, who he instead knows as "Chuck" Ramkisson.

Hans was born in Holland, and he met his wife Rachel after moving to England for his work in the stock market. It was during this time when Hans first played cricket. The novel opens as the married couple Hans and Rachel and their child Jake are living in a run-down apartment near the World Trade Center, paying $6,000 a month in rent. Though their building was not directly damaged, the couple are scared to return to their apartment after the events of 9/11.

Chuck, a Trinidadian immigrant, meets Hans in 2002. He guides Hans into and through the world of the Staten Island Cricket Club, most of whose members are also of West Indian or South Asian descent. Chuck is a charismatic idealist, running multiple (often illegitimate) businesses, and making big, optimistic plans for the future. While Hans is swept along by Chuck’s magnetic ardor for the American dream, Rachel moves back to London under the pretense of safety for their young son and ideological indignation over the American fixation on economic oppression.

Despite his family's move back to London, Hans is content making visits every other week to see them. The novel often flips back and forth between the story of Hans and Chuck. Though Rachel is a markedly less likable character than Chuck, Hans eventually follows her back to London. However, in their year apart, Rachel has taken a new lover who has befriended their son Jake. Hans is distraught, though his reunion with Rachel serves as a continuation of their relationship despite their third-party loves. Hans' time away from New York leads him to lose touch with his Trinidadian friend who is discovered, years later handcuffed and disposed of in the Gowanus Canal of New York. The reader is left without a conclusive explanation for Chuck's death, though it is heavily implied that his shady business dealings led to his demise.

== Publication and reviews ==
The writing of Netherland occupied O'Neill for seven years. When it was finished, O'Neill had great trouble in finding an agent. The book was turned down by every major US publisher, until it was accepted by Pantheon Books, a division of Random House. Chief executive Sonny Mehta was a cricket fan, and after reading Netherland, wrote a strong personal recommendation to booksellers.

Netherland was published in May 2008 and was featured on the cover of the New York Times Book Review where senior editor Dwight Garner called it "the wittiest, angriest, most exacting and most desolate work of fiction we've yet had about life in New York and London after the World Trade Center fell". Later that year, the book was included in the New York Times Book Review list of "10 Best Books of 2008" as chosen by the paper's editors.

James Wood, writing in The New Yorker, called it "one of the most remarkable postcolonial books I have ever read". He wrote that it has been "consistently misread as a 9/11 novel, which stints what is most remarkable about it: that it is a postcolonial re-writing of The Great Gatsby." In an interview with the author published at the end of the Harper Perennial paperback edition, Joseph O'Neill remarks, "Clearly Netherland is having some sort of conversation with The Great Gatsby—saying goodbye to it perhaps, and to some of the notions associated with that wonderful book."

== Awards and nominations ==
In the weeks leading up the announcement of the 2008 Man Booker Prize, Netherland was spoken of by some literary pundits as being the favourite to win. However, on 9 September 2008, the Booker nominee shortlist was announced and the novel, surprisingly at least for some critics at the New York Times, failed to make the list. The book was also nominated for the Warwick Prize for Writing (2008/9) and made it to the long list of that prize announced in November 2008.

Netherland won the 2009 PEN/Faulkner Award for Fiction, and the 2009 Kerry Group Irish Fiction Award.

On 12 April 2010, Netherland was announced as one of the eight novels on the shortlist for the International Dublin Literary Award.

== Feature film adaptation ==
In August 2009, it was announced that Sam Mendes's Neal Street Productions would collaborate with Harpo Films to produce a film adaptation of Joseph O'Neill's novel Netherland, with Mendes eyeing the project as a potential directing vehicle and Christopher Hampton writing the screenplay. By September, it was reported that Focus Features had come aboard the project.

== Translations ==
The punning title is untranslatable into Dutch, and the Dutch translation takes the title Laagland ("Lowland") rather than the more literal but ambiguous Nederland.
