= 1887 Virginia Orange and Blue football team =

American college football season

1887 Virginia Orange and Blue football
- Conference: Independent
- Record: 0–0–1
- Head coach: None

1887 Southern college football independents records
	Conf.			Overall
Team	W	L	T	W		L		T
Navy		–		3	–	1	–	0
Georgetown		–		2	–	1	–	0
Richmond		–		1	–	1	–	0
Virginia		–		0	–	0	–	1
Johns Hopkins		–		0	–	2	–	0

The 1887 Virginia Orange and Blue football team represented the University of Virginia as an independent during the 1887 college football season. On November 13, 1887, the Cavaliers and Pantops Academy fought to a scoreless tie in the first organized football game in the state of Virginia. Students at UVA were playing pickup games of the kicking-style of football as early as 1870, and some accounts even claim that some industrious ones organized a game against Washington and Lee College in 1871, just two years after Rutgers and Princeton's historic first game in 1869. But no record has been found of the score of this contest.

== Schedule ==
Date	Opponent	Site	Result	Source
December 15	at Pantops Academy	Pantops, VA	T 0–0	
