= 1887 Harvard Crimson football team =

American college football season

1887 Harvard Crimson football
- Conference: Independent
- Record: 10–1
- Head coach: None
- Home stadium: Jarvis Field

1887 Eastern college football independents records
	Conf.			Overall
Team	W	L	T	W		L		T
Yale		–		9	–	0	–	0
Penn State		–		2	–	0	–	0
Harvard		–		10	–	1	–	0
Lafayette		–		7	–	2	–	0
Princeton		–		7	–	2	–	0
Lehigh		–		4	–	3	–	0
Williams		–		3	–	3	–	0
Penn		–		6	–	7	–	0
Wesleyan		–		4	–	5	–	0
Tufts		–		4	–	6	–	0
Massachusetts		–		2	–	3	–	0
Rutgers		–		2	–	6	–	0
Bucknell		–		0	–	2	–	0
Cornell		–		0	–	2	–	0
Franklin & Marshall		–		0	–	2	–	0
Vermont		–		0	–	2	–	0

The 1887 Harvard Crimson football team represented Harvard University in the 1887 college football season. They finished with a 10–1 record. In the first 10 games of the season, the Crimson outscored opponents 652 to 6. The sole loss came in the final game, on November 24, a 17–8 loss to Yale at the Polo Grounds.

== Schedule ==
Date	Time	Opponent	Site	Result	Attendance	Source
October 5	3:15 p.m.	at Tufts	Medford, MA	W 86–0		
October 12		at Phillips Exeter	Exeter, NH	W 68–0		
October 15	3:20 p.m.	Boston Tech	Jarvis Field; Cambridge, MA	W 60–0	600	
October 19		Williams	Jarvis Field; Cambridge, MA	W 52–6		
October 22		Amherst	Jarvis Field; Cambridge, MA	W 98–0		
October 26		Tufts	Jarvis Field; Cambridge, MA	W 60–0		
October 29		Phillips Exeter	Jarvis Field; Cambridge, MA	W 54–0		
November 5		Wesleyan	Jarvis Field; Cambridge, MA	W 110–0		
November 12		Princeton	Jarvis Field; Cambridge, MA (rivalry)	W 12–0	5,000	
November 19		Penn	Jarvis Field; Cambridge, MA (rivalry)	W 42–0	500	
November 24	2:00 p.m.	vs. Yale	Polo Grounds; New York, NY (rivalry)	L 8–17	15,000	

== Second team schedule ==
Date	Time	Opponent	Site	Result	Source
October 12	4:20 p.m.	at Boston Tech*	Union Grounds; Boston, MA	L 10–12	
*Non-conference game
