= 1887 Tufts Jumbos football team =

American college football season

1887 Tufts Jumbos football
- Conference: Independent
- Record: 4–6
- Head coach: Frank W. Durkee (1st season)
- Captain: Frank W. Durkee

1887 Eastern college football independents records
	Conf.			Overall
Team	W	L	T	W		L		T
Yale		–		9	–	0	–	0
Penn State		–		2	–	0	–	0
Harvard		–		10	–	1	–	0
Lafayette		–		7	–	2	–	0
Princeton		–		7	–	2	–	0
Lehigh		–		4	–	3	–	0
Williams		–		3	–	3	–	0
Penn		–		6	–	7	–	0
Wesleyan		–		4	–	5	–	0
Tufts		–		4	–	6	–	0
Massachusetts		–		2	–	3	–	0
Rutgers		–		2	–	6	–	0
Bucknell		–		0	–	2	–	0
Cornell		–		0	–	2	–	0
Franklin & Marshall		–		0	–	2	–	0
Vermont		–		0	–	2	–	0

The 1887 Tufts Jumbos football team represented Tufts University as an independent during the 1887 college football season. Led by Frank W. Durkee in his first and only season as head coach, the Jumbos compiled a record of 4–6.

== Schedule ==
Date	Time	Opponent	Site	Result	Source
October 5	3:15 p.m.	Harvard	College Hill; Medford, MA	L 0–86	
October 18		Boston University	College Hill; Medford, MA	W 5–0	
October 19		Dartmouth	Medford, MA	L 0–52	
October 22	3:15 p.m.	Harvard second team	College Hill; Medford, MA	W 22–0	
		at Maine		L 6–12	
October 26		at Harvard	Jarvis Field; Cambridge, MA	L 0–60	
November 3	3:00 p.m.	Vermont	College Hill; Medford, MA	W 28–6	
November 5		at Exeter		L 8–29	
November 19		Andover		W 32–6	
November 24		Boston Tech		L 0–36	
