= Joseph O'Neill (writer, born 1964) =

Irish novelist & non-fiction writer

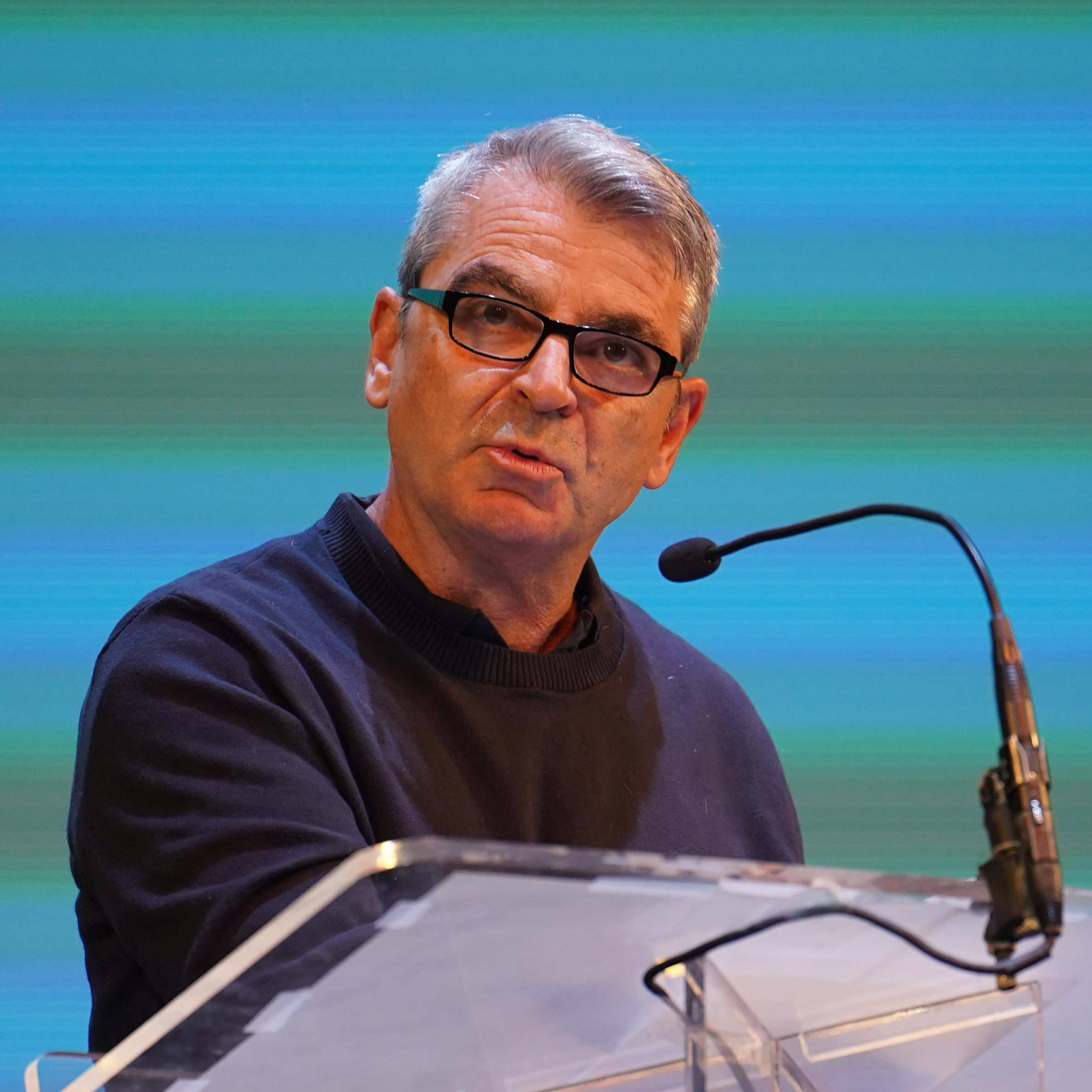
- Joseph O'Neill at the 2025 National Book Awards reading
- Born: 23 February 1964 (age 62); Cork, Ireland
- Occupations: lawyer, fiction writer, cultural critic
- Writing career
- Period: 1991–present
- Notable work: Netherland

Joseph O'Neill is an Irish novelist and non-fiction writer. O'Neill's novel Netherland was awarded the 2009 PEN/Faulkner Award for Fiction and the Kerry Group Irish Fiction Award.

== Early life ==
Joseph O'Neill was born in Cork, Ireland, on 23 February 1964. He is of half-Irish and half-Turkish ancestry.

O'Neill's parents moved around much in O'Neill's youth: O'Neill spent time in Mozambique as a toddler and in Turkey until the age of four, and he also lived in Iran. From the age of six, O'Neill lived in the Netherlands, where he attended the Lycée français de La Haye and the British School in the Netherlands. He read law at Girton College, Cambridge, preferring it over English because "literature was too precious" and he wanted it to remain a hobby. O'Neill started off his literary career in poetry but had turned away from it by the age of 24. After being called to the English Bar in 1987, he spent a year writing his first novel. O'Neill then entered full-time practice as a barrister in London, principally in the field of business law. Since 1998 he has lived in New York City.

== Career ==
=== Writing ===
O'Neill is the author of five novels. He is best known for Netherland, which was published in May 2008 and was featured on the cover of the New York Times Book Review, where it was called "the wittiest, angriest, most exacting and most desolate work of fiction we've yet had about life in New York and London after the World Trade Center fell". It was included in The New York Times list of the 10 Best Books of 2008. Literary critic James Wood called it "one of the most remarkable postcolonial books I have ever read". In an interview with the BBC in June 2009, US President Barack Obama revealed that he was reading it, describing it as "an excellent novel."

Among the books on the longlist, it was the favourite to win the Man Booker Prize. However, on 9 September 2008, the Booker shortlist was announced, and the novel failed to make the list. The book received the 2009 PEN/Faulkner Award for Fiction and the 2009 Kerry Group Irish Fiction Award. It was shortlisted for the Dublin International IMPAC Award.

His next novel, The Dog (2014), was longlisted for the Man Booker Prize for Fiction, named a Notable Book of 2014 by The New York Times, and shortlisted for the Wodehouse Prize for Comic Fiction. His most recent novel, Godwin, was published in June 2024. It was a finalist for the National Book Critics Circle Award for Fiction and shortlisted for the Mark Twain American Voice in Literature Award.

O'Neill is also the author of Good Trouble (2018), a collection of short stories, most of which first appeared in the New Yorker or Harper's magazine. Two of his stories have been awarded an O. Henry prize. Others have been anthologized in:

- New Irish Short Stories (ed. Joseph O'Connor) (Faber & Faber) (2011)
- Faber Book of Best New Irish Short Stories (ed. David Marcus) (Faber & Faber) (2007)
- Dislocation: Stories from a New Ireland (ed. Caroline Walsh) (Carroll & Graf) (2003)
- Phoenix Irish Short Stories (ed. David Marcus) (Phoenix) (1999)

O'Neill has also written a non-fiction book, Blood-Dark Track: A Family History, which was a New York Times Notable Book for 2002 and a Book of the Year for the Economist and the Irish Times.

In 2019, O'Neill began to publish political essays in the New York Review of Books. He has also written literary and cultural criticism, notably for The Atlantic Monthly.

=== Teaching ===
He is a Distinguished Visiting Professor of Written Arts at Bard College.

== Personal life ==
O'Neill speaks English, French and Dutch. He played club cricket in the Netherlands and the UK, and has played for many years at the Staten Island Cricket Club, much like his Netherland protagonist Hans. His love of cricket continues and he is an active player (as of 2015). In an interview with The Paris Review in 2014 O'Neill said, explaining his interest in writing about Dubai in The Dog, "I’ve moved around so much and lived in so many different places that I don’t really belong to a particular place." He lives in Brooklyn with his partner, writer Rivka Galchen.

== Bibliography ==
=== Novels ===
- Godwin: A Novel (Pantheon; Fourth Estate) (2024)
- The Dog (Pantheon; Fourth Estate) (2014)
- Netherland (Pantheon; Fourth Estate) (2008)
- The Breezes (Faber & Faber) (1996)
- This Is the Life (Faber & Faber; Farrar Straus & Giroux) (1991)

=== Short fiction ===
Collections

- Good Trouble (2018)

Selected stories

- "Light Secrets" The New Yorker, January 18, 2026
- "Keuka Lake" The New Yorker, February 23, 2025
- "The Time Being" The New Yorker, March 11, 2024
- "Rainbows" The New Yorker, September 28, 2020
- "The Flier" The New Yorker, November 4, 2019
- "The First World" The New Yorker, June 25, 2018
- "The Poltroon Husband" The New Yorker, March 5, 2018
- "The Sinking of the Houston" The New Yorker, October 23, 2017
- "The Mustache in 2010" Harper's, June 30, 2017
- "Pardon Edward Snowden" The New Yorker, December 12, 2016
- "The Trusted Traveler" Harper's, May 20, 2016
- "The Referees". The New Yorker. 1 September 2014.
- "The World of Cheese". Harper's. Vol. 318, no. 1905. February 2009. pp. 61–68.

=== Non-fiction ===
- Blood-Dark Track: A Family History (Granta Books) (2001)

Introductory essays

- The Blue Mask by Joel Lane (Influx Press) (2023)
- Amsterdam Stories by Nescio, tr. Damion Searles (New York Review of Books Classics) (2012)
- The Actual: A Novella by Saul Bellow (Penguin Classics) (2009)

Selected personal writing

- "Good Day Sunshine" In Their Lives: Great Writers on Great Beatles Songs (by Andrew Blauner, Ed.) (Prentice Hall Press) (2017)
- "Memories of Trump's Wedding" The New Yorker online, August 1, 2016
- "A Sartorial Personal History" Esquire: The Big Black Book #3 Spring 2014
- "What's Wrong With Me?" The Dublin Review 50, Spring 2013
- "Losed" Granta 111, July 2010
- "The Relevance of Cosmopolitanism" The Atlantic, Fiction Issue 2009
- "Why Updike Matters" Granta online, January 29, 2009
- "Portrait of My Father" Granta online, November 20, 2008
- The Ascent of Man (Granta 72, Winter 2000)

=== Selected critical writings ===
- "Population: 1" Poetry Ireland Review 116: A WB Yeats Special Issue (2015)
- "Roth v Roth v Roth" (on Philip Roth) The Atlantic February 27, 2012
- "Man Without a Country" (on V.S. Naipaul) The Atlantic July 24, 2011
- "Killing Her Softly" (on Muriel Spark) The Atlantic August 11, 2010
- "Touched by Evil" (on Flannery O'Connor) The Atlantic June 1, 2009
- "The Last Laugh" (on Flann O'Brien) The Atlantic May 1, 2008
- "Bowling Alone" (on C.L.R. James) The Atlantic October 1, 2007
- "New Fiction" (on Never Let Me Go by Kazuo Ishiguro) The Atlantic May 2005
