= 1887 Cornell Big Red football team =

American college football season

1887 Cornell Big Red football
- Conference: Independent
- Record: 0–2
- Head coach: None
- Captain: James H. Sheldon

1887 Eastern college football independents records
	Conf.			Overall
Team	W	L	T	W		L		T
Yale		–		9	–	0	–	0
Penn State		–		2	–	0	–	0
Harvard		–		10	–	1	–	0
Lafayette		–		7	–	2	–	0
Princeton		–		7	–	2	–	0
Lehigh		–		4	–	3	–	0
Williams		–		3	–	3	–	0
Penn		–		6	–	7	–	0
Wesleyan		–		4	–	5	–	0
Tufts		–		4	–	6	–	0
Massachusetts		–		2	–	3	–	0
Rutgers		–		2	–	6	–	0
Bucknell		–		0	–	2	–	0
Cornell		–		0	–	2	–	0
Franklin & Marshall		–		0	–	2	–	0
Vermont		–		0	–	2	–	0

The 1887 Cornell Big Red football team was an American football team that represented Cornell University during the 1887 college football season. In the first season of intercollegiate football at Cornell, the team compiled a 0–2 record, losing games to Union (24–10) and Lehigh (38–0).

== Schedule ==
Date	Opponent	Site	Result	Source
November 12	Union (NY)	Ithaca, NY	L 10–24	
November 24	vs. Lehigh	Elmira, NY	L 10–38	
