= 1887 California Golden Bears football team =

American college football season

1887 California Golden Bears football
- Conference: Independent
- Record: 4–0
- Head coach: None
- Captain: Frederick C. Turner

1887 Western college football independents records
	Conf.			Overall
Team	W	L	T	W		L		T
California		–		4	–	0	–	0

The 1887 California Golden Bears football team was an American football team that represented the University of California, Berkeley during the 1887 college football season. The team competed as an independent, without a head coach, and compiled a record of 4–0.

== Schedule ==
Date	Opponent	Site	Result
January 2	San Francisco Club	Berkeley, CA	W 26–0
February 25	Volunteers	Berkeley, CA	W 14–0
March 5	Reliance Athletic Club	Berkeley, CA	W 14–6
March 26	Reliance Athletic Club	Berkeley, CA	W 12–6
