= 1887 Penn State football team =

American college football season

1887 Penn State football
- Conference: Independent
- Record: 2–0
- Head coach: None
- Captain: George Linsz
- Home stadium: Old Main lawn

1887 Eastern college football independents records
	Conf.			Overall
Team	W	L	T	W		L		T
Yale		–		9	–	0	–	0
Penn State		–		2	–	0	–	0
Harvard		–		10	–	1	–	0
Lafayette		–		7	–	2	–	0
Princeton		–		7	–	2	–	0
Lehigh		–		4	–	3	–	0
Williams		–		3	–	3	–	0
Penn		–		6	–	7	–	0
Wesleyan		–		4	–	5	–	0
Tufts		–		4	–	6	–	0
Massachusetts		–		2	–	3	–	0
Rutgers		–		2	–	6	–	0
Bucknell		–		0	–	2	–	0
Cornell		–		0	–	2	–	0
Franklin & Marshall		–		0	–	2	–	0
Vermont		–		0	–	2	–	0

The 1887 Penn State football team was an American football team that represented Pennsylvania State College—now known as Pennsylvania State University–as an independent during the 1887 college football season. The team went 2–0 and are the school's only unscored-upon team. The captain and quarterback of the team was George H. "Lucy" Linsz. He later changed his last name from Linsz to Lins, probably during World War I. In 1887, Penn State's school colors were dark pink and black.

== Schedule ==
Date	Time	Opponent	Site	Result	Source
November 12	9:30 a.m.	at Bucknell	Bucknell campus; Lewisburg, PA	W 54–0	
November 19		Bucknell	Old Main; State College, PA	W 24–0	
