= Godwin (novel) =

- Author: Joseph O'Neill
- Language: English
- Publisher: Pantheon Books
- Publication date: June 2024
- Pages: 288
- ISBN: 9780593701324
- Dewey Decimal: 823.92

Godwin: A Novel is a 2024 book by Joseph O'Neill. The novel is narrated by two American writers; Mark Wolfe, who is attempting to contact Godwin, an elusive young African association football player alleged to be a generational talent, and Lakesha Williams, a senior member of the writing cooperative Mark is a member of. The book received generally positive reactions from critics; it was listed as a New York Times Notable Book, was a finalist for the National Book Critics Circle Award for Fiction and shortlisted for the Mark Twain American Voice in Literature Award.

== Synopsis ==
In 2015, Mark Wolfe, a White grant writer at a Pittsburgh writing co-op called "the Group", has his pay suspended for two weeks by the Group's Black co-founder, Lakesha Williams, after a negative interaction with a client. Geoff, Mark's British half-brother, is attempting to make a name for himself as an association football agent and is entranced by a video of a young, Lionel Messi-like soccer savant in Africa named Godwin. Mark, bored and hoping to avoid a midlife crisis, agrees to help Geoff find and recruit Godwin. Mark travels to Europe, and the brothers end up enlisting French talent scout Jean-Luc Lefebvre to track down Godwin in Benin. Mark returns to America, and the narration shifts to Lakesha, who faces a power struggle within the Group where her position is threatened by allegations of corruption. The two narratives in America and Benin eventually cross.

Critics noted the novel theme's of criticism of capitalism and postcolonialism; several compared Lefebvre's segment to Joseph Conrad's Heart of Darkness (1899), also about a European man venturing into Africa.

The novel is written in first-person narrative, alternating perspectives between Lakesha and Mark.

== Reception ==
Reviewing the novel for The Wall Street Journal, Sam Sacks praised Mark and Lakesha's storylines and highlighted O'Neill's handling of the novel's themes, noting, "But what is most satisfying about “Godwin” is the range of its interests and themes. Mr. O’Neill is a capable satirist but is also good at quick, affecting secondary character sketches. He reaches for big geopolitical subjects like globalism and immigration but seamlessly shrinks down to dwell on Lakesha’s office conflict and Mark’s disrupted family life." In The Washington Post, Ron Charles also noted O'Neill's narrative ability, saying, "Nobody else’s fiction tears up the ground quite like O’Neill’s profoundly introspective novels. But I worry that they’re essentially review proof. They can sound, in summary, either too static to be interesting, like “The Dog,” or too convoluted to be intelligible, like this new one. And yet in their careful braiding of anxiety and aspiration, his stories are marvels of narrative magic and stylistic panache." Two critics reviewed the novel for The Guardian; Anthony Cummins described Lakesha's arc an "edge-of-your-seat drama", and celebrated Godwin's "enthralling fireside quality, ushering us with deceptive simplicity into a labyrinth of motive and desire, breathtaking betrayals and artfully twined threads."

Other commentators were more divided, complimenting some elements and criticizing others. A. O. Scott similarly praised O'Neill's "artful sleight of hand" but was unsatisfied with the novel's indirectness. Scott ended his review with, "I wanted more — more of a reason to have cared about Lakesha and Mark, two of the more memorably vexed and vexatious fictional characters I’ve encountered in a while. This is a very smart book. I’m not sure that’s a compliment." Contrasting his colleague at The Guardian, Tanjil Rashid felt that Lakesha's segment was out of place and that the O'Neill made narrative decisions that undermined his own ideas. Rashid singled out Lefebvre's correspondence with Mark regarding his search for Godwin in Africa as the most "engrossing" part of the book.

Vulture's Ryu Spaeth lauded Mark's characterization and the novel's setup, but was disappointed with the plot and felt Mark's return to America "[...]is where what has been a terrific novel so far goes completely off the rails, culminating in one of the most absurd endings I’ve read in some time." Spaeth believed Lefebvre and Mark traveling in Benin would have made for better material, and felt that "O’Neill lost his nerve and decided to sidestep the difficulties of depicting “a poverty-stricken nation through two characters who are not exactly the best equipped to understand it.” Spaeth criticized Lakesha's character as dull and speculated, "Perhaps in an attempt to steer Lakesha clear of stereotype, she is made into a dutiful manager who just wants to run her company in peace, and the result is a dreadfully boring character who doesn’t have the same depth of interiority as Mark."

Writer Laura Marsh disagreed with Scott and Spaeth in The New York Review of Books and spotlighted Lakesha's arc and her differences from other O'Neill characters. "I do not think the choice to send Mark home early deprives us of the more exciting book that might have been, or even that Mark’s sections as they stand are “the more dramatic” or “ambitious” parts of the novel, as A.O. Scott suggested in The New York Times. That’s because Lakesha Williams, not Mark Wolfe, is the central character in Godwin. The novel both opens and closes in Lakesha’s voice, and her sections swerve into more unexpected, sometimes even more absurd, territory than his do." Marsh noted the contrast between Lakesha's human resources mindset and selflessness with Mark's idealism and selfishness, describing them as "...two types of liberal, who are ostensibly on the same side but have markedly different priorities and can’t in fact work that well together." She concluded, "If Mark can’t sign Godwin before his rivals do, he won’t get rich; if people like Lakesha can’t keep institutions from sliding into chaos, we know where that leads. [...] The ordinary stuff, it turns out, is perilous."

Writing for Esquire, Andrew Schenker cited Godwin and Rita Bullwinkel's Headshot as reigniting interest in sports novels among adult readers.
