= 1886 Crescent Athletic Club football team =

American college football season

1886 Crescent Athletic Club football
- Conference: Independent
- Record: 4–1
- Home stadium: Crescent Athletic Club grounds

The 1886 Crescent Athletic Club football team was an American football team that represented the Crescent Athletic Club during the 1886 college football season. The team compiled a 4–1 record and played its home games at Crescent Athletic Club grounds at Ninth Avenue and Ninth Street in Brooklyn.

== Schedule ==
Date	Opponent	Site	Result	Attendance	Source
October 23	Brooklyn Hill	Crescent Athletic Club grounds; Brooklyn, NY	W 20–0		
October 30	Olympic Clubs	Brooklyn Athletic Association grounds; Brooklyn, NY	W		
November 2	vs. Yale	Polo Grounds; New York, NY	L 0–82		
November 20	NYU	Crescent Athletic Club grounds; Brooklyn, NY	W 36–0		
November 27	Staten Island Football Club	Crescent Athletic Club grounds; Brooklyn, NY	W 16–0		
