= 1887 Yale Bulldogs football team =

American college football season

1887 Yale Bulldogs football
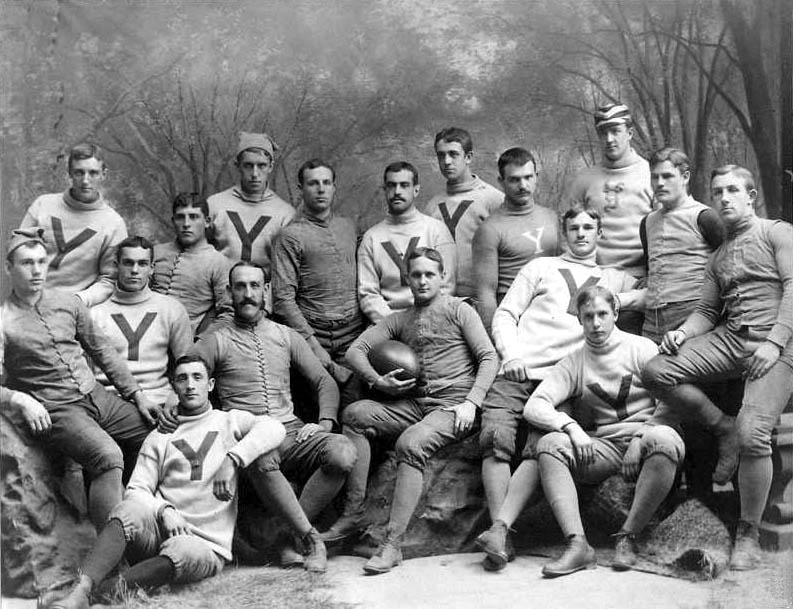

National champion IFA champion
- Conference: Intercollegiate Football Association
- Record: 9–0 ( IFA)
- Head coach: None
- Captain: Harry Beecher
- Home stadium: Yale Field

1887 Eastern college football independents records
	Conf.			Overall
Team	W	L	T	W		L		T
Yale		–		9	–	0	–	0
Penn State		–		2	–	0	–	0
Harvard		–		10	–	1	–	0
Lafayette		–		7	–	2	–	0
Princeton		–		7	–	2	–	0
Lehigh		–		4	–	3	–	0
Williams		–		3	–	3	–	0
Penn		–		6	–	7	–	0
Wesleyan		–		4	–	5	–	0
Tufts		–		4	–	6	–	0
Massachusetts		–		2	–	3	–	0
Rutgers		–		2	–	6	–	0
Bucknell		–		0	–	2	–	0
Cornell		–		0	–	2	–	0
Franklin & Marshall		–		0	–	2	–	0
Vermont		–		0	–	2	–	0

The 1887 Yale Bulldogs football team was an American football team that represented Yale University as a member of the Intercollegiate Football Association (IFA) during the 1887 college football season. The team compiled a perfect 9–0 record, shut out seven of nine opponents, and outscored all opponents by a total of 515 to 12. Quarterback Harry Beecher was the team's captain.

There was no contemporaneous system in 1887 for determining a national champion. However, Yale was retroactively named as the national champion by the Billingsley Report, Helms Athletic Foundation, Houlgate System, National Championship Foundation, and Parke H. Davis.

== Schedule ==
Date	Time	Opponent	Site	Result	Attendance	Source
October 5		Wesleyan	Yale Field; New Haven, CT	W 38–0		
October 15		at Wesleyan	Middletown, CT	W 106–0		
October 22	1:00 p.m.	at Williams	Weston Field; Williamstown, MA	W 74–0		
October 29		at Penn	University Athletic Grounds; Philadelphia, PA	W 50–0		
November 5		Rutgers	Yale Field; New Haven, CT	W 74–0		
November 8		vs. Crescent Athletic Club	Polo Grounds; New York, NY	W 70–0		
November 12		Wesleyan	Yale Field; New Haven, CT	W 68–4		
November 19		vs. Princeton	Polo Grounds; New York, NY (rivalry)	W 12–0		
November 24	2:00 p.m.	vs. Harvard	Polo Grounds; New York, NY (rivalry)	W 17–8	15,000	

== Roster ==
- Baker, FB
- Harry Beecher, QB
- William T. Bull, FB
- G. R. Carter, G
- William Herbert Corbin, C
- S. M. Cross, T
- Foster, FB
- Charles O. Gill
- Graves, HB-FB
- Mason, HB
- Morrison, HB
- F. C. Pratt, E
- William Rhodes, T
- Robinson, E
- Amos Alonzo Stagg, HB
- Frederic W. Wallace, E
- Williams, HB
- George Washington Woodruff, G
- William Wurtenburg, FB
