= Harry Beecher =

American football player and sportswriter (1868–1948)

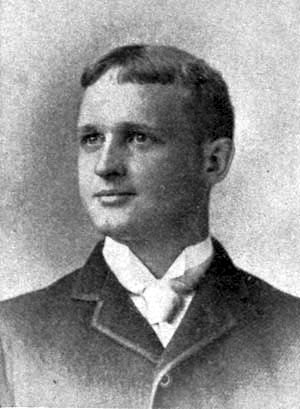
- Beecher, c. 1888

Profile
- Position: Quarterback

Personal information
- Born: September 13, 1868; Peekskill, New York, U.S.
- Died: September 26, 1948; Wilmette, Illinois, U.S.

Career information
- College: Yale (1884–1887)

Awards and highlights
- National championship (1886, 1887)

Henry Ward "Harry" Beecher (September 13, 1868 – September 26, 1948) was an American college football player and sportswriter. He was the subject of the first American football card, printed in 1888.

Henry was son of Henry Barton and Harriet Jones Benedict Beecher. His paternal grandfather was Henry Ward Beecher and one of his paternal great-aunts was Harriet Beecher Stowe. He graduated from Yale University in 1888.

== Yale ==
Beecher was a prominent quarterback for the Yale Bulldogs football team of Yale University, called by one writer the school's greatest ever at the position.

=== 1886 ===
He accounted for 33 touchdowns in 1886.

=== 1887 ===
He was captain in 1887. One source lists Beecher as the player of the year.
