= 1887 Princeton Tigers football team =

American college football season

1887 Princeton Tigers football
- Conference: Independent
- Record: 7–2
- Head coach: None
- Captain: Woody Wagenhorst

1887 Eastern college football independents records
	Conf.			Overall
Team	W	L	T	W		L		T
Yale		–		9	–	0	–	0
Penn State		–		2	–	0	–	0
Harvard		–		10	–	1	–	0
Lafayette		–		7	–	2	–	0
Princeton		–		7	–	2	–	0
Lehigh		–		4	–	3	–	0
Williams		–		3	–	3	–	0
Penn		–		6	–	7	–	0
Wesleyan		–		4	–	5	–	0
Tufts		–		4	–	6	–	0
Massachusetts		–		2	–	3	–	0
Rutgers		–		2	–	6	–	0
Bucknell		–		0	–	2	–	0
Cornell		–		0	–	2	–	0
Franklin & Marshall		–		0	–	2	–	0
Vermont		–		0	–	2	–	0

The 1887 Princeton Tigers football team represented Princeton University in the 1887 college football season. The team finished with a 7–2 record. The Tigers held their first nine opponents scoreless, winning those games by a combined 420 to 0 score. The team then lost the last two games of the season against Harvard and Yale.

== Schedule ==
Date	Time	Opponent	Site	Result	Attendance	Source
October 8		Lafayette	University Field; Princeton, NJ	W 47–0		
October 12		at Rutgers	New Brunswick, NJ (rivalry)	W 30–0	1,500	
October 15		Lehigh	University Field; Princeton, NJ	W 80–0		
October 19		at Penn	University Athletic Grounds; Philadelphia, PA (rivalry)	W 57–0	3,000	
October 22		Penn	University Field; Princeton, NJ	W 48–0		
October 29		Wesleyan	University Field; Princeton, NJ	W 69–0		
November 5	3:15 p.m.	at Penn	University Athletic Grounds; Philadelphia, PA	W 95–0		
November 12		at Harvard	Jarvis Field; Cambridge, MA (rivalry)	L 0–12	5,000	
November 19		vs. Yale	Polo Grounds; New York, NY (rivalry)	L 0–12		

== Roster ==
- Knowlton Ames, FB
- Black
- Boraird
- Roscoe Channing, HB
- Chapin
- Church
- Hector Cowan, T
- William George
- Hancock
- S. Hodge
- William Mann Irvine
- Hugh Janeway, G
- McMahon
- Payne
- Luther E. Price
- Robert Elliott Speer
- Woody Wagenhorst
