= 1887 college football season =

American college football season

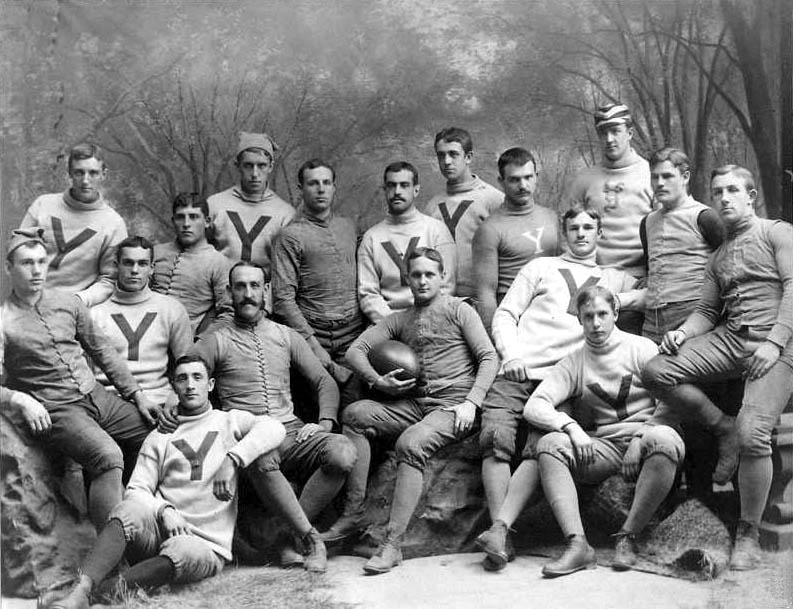
- 1887 Yale Bulldogs
- Total No. of teams: 15
- Regular season: October 1 to November 26
- Champion: Yale

The 1887 college football season had no clear-cut champion, with the Official NCAA Division I Football Records Book listing Yale as having been selected national champions. In the West, the 1887 Michigan Wolverines football team compiled a 5–0 record, including three wins over Notre Dame (who was playing its first game ever and did not have a varsity team yet), and outscored its opponents by a combined score of 102 to 10.

== Statistical leaders ==
- Player scoring most points: Knowlton Ames, Princeton, 219

== Conference standings ==
The following is a potentially incomplete list of conference standings:

1887 Eastern Intercollegiate Football Association standings
	Conf.					Overall
Team	W		L		T	W		L		T
MIT $	4	–	0	–	0	5	–	1	–	0
Dartmouth	2	–	1	–	1	3	–	1	–	1
Trinity (CT)	2	–	2	–	0	3	–	3	–	1
Amherst	1	–	3	–	0	4	–	6	–	0
Stevens	0	–	3	–	1	0	–	6	–	1
$ – Conference champion

=== Independents ===
1887 Eastern college football independents records
	Conf.			Overall
Team	W	L	T	W		L		T
Yale		–		9	–	0	–	0
Penn State		–		2	–	0	–	0
Harvard		–		10	–	1	–	0
Lafayette		–		7	–	2	–	0
Princeton		–		7	–	2	–	0
Lehigh		–		4	–	3	–	0
Williams		–		3	–	3	–	0
Penn		–		6	–	7	–	0
Wesleyan		–		4	–	5	–	0
Tufts		–		4	–	6	–	0
Massachusetts		–		2	–	3	–	0
Rutgers		–		2	–	6	–	0
Bucknell		–		0	–	2	–	0
Cornell		–		0	–	2	–	0
Franklin & Marshall		–		0	–	2	–	0
Vermont		–		0	–	2	–	0

1887 Midwestern college football independents records
	Conf.			Overall
Team	W	L	T	W		L		T
Michigan		–		5	–	0	–	0
Minnesota		–		2	–	0	–	0
Cincinnati		–		1	–	0	–	0
Washington University		–		1	–	0	–	0
Butler		–		2	–	1	–	0
Indiana		–		0	–	1	–	0
Purdue		–		0	–	1	–	0
Wabash		–		0	–	1	–	0
Notre Dame		–		0	–	3	–	0
Albion		–		0	–	1	–	0

1887 Southern college football independents records
	Conf.			Overall
Team	W	L	T	W		L		T
Navy		–		3	–	1	–	0
Georgetown		–		2	–	1	–	0
Richmond		–		1	–	1	–	0
Virginia		–		0	–	0	–	1
Johns Hopkins		–		0	–	2	–	0

1887 Western college football independents records
	Conf.			Overall
Team	W	L	T	W		L		T
California		–		4	–	0	–	0
