= Cutler School (New York City) =

Primary through college preparatory boys' school

Coordinates: 40.76450°N 73.96965°W

- Manhattan, New York City; United States

Information
- Type: Primary college

The Cutler School of New York was a primary through college preparatory boys' school initially located at 713 6th Ave., between 23rd and 24th Street, only a few blocks from the Roosevelt home in Manhattan, New York City, New York. Classes were originally held on the second floor above Burns Oyster and Chop House.

== History ==
The school was established in October 1876 by Arthur Hamilton Cutler. (A.B., Harvard 1870; Ph.D., Princeton 1885). The school's founder tutored Theodore Roosevelt, his brother, Elliott Roosevelt, his sister, Corinne Roosevelt, and his future wife, Edith Carow. According to The New York Times, Theodore Roosevelt was the first graduate of the school, although Roosevelt's autobiography merely refers to Cutler as his "tutor" for three years, from 1873 until he entered Harvard in 1876.

Advertising for the school began in The New York Times on September 20, 1876, which said that “the design of this class is to thoroughly prepare boys for our best colleges.” The initial enrollment was limited to just twelve pupils, boys aged eight to eighteen. Classes began on September 26, 1876. Within two years, by 1878, the school moved from the second floor of the restaurant to 20 West 43rd Street (between 5th and 6th Avenues). The size of the school doubled and the students were divided into a Senior Division and a Junior Division. By 1884 the school was large enough to put forward a football team of eleven players. In 1885 it changed its name to Arthur Cutler's School for Boys and by 1893 it was considered to be one of the leading secondary schools in the eastern United States, along with the St. Paul's School in Garden City and the Berkeley School for Boys located a block away at 20 West 44th Street. Because of their close proximity the Cutler and Berkeley Schools would become rivals both on and off the athletic field.

=== Bloodbath at Hampden Park ===
In November 1894 a Harvard-Yale football game called the “Bloodbath at Hampden Park” took place. Upwards of five players were hospitalized with injuries during the match. Following Yale's 12–4 victory, rival fans took the pattern of violence into the streets. Afterwards the Harvard-Yale football game was suspended indefinitely. A number of Cutler graduates were involved in Harvard football at the time, and Theodore Roosevelt was advocating for the suspension to be lifted. In 1895 Arthur Cutler was named the President of the Schoolmaster's Association of New York and he lobbied to restore the game, and invited Walter Camp to speak to the Schoolmaster's Association of New York about the importance of athletics to the development of young men.

In 1893 the Cutler School was relocated to 20 East 50th Street, across the street from St. Patrick's Cathedral. It now had over 200 pupils and 23 instructors. Tuition was $250 per term or $400 for the full year. It 1898 it was renamed as "The Cutler School." In 1900 Arthur Cutler was the temporary chairman who presided over the founding of the New York Interscholastic Athletic Association.

In April 1911 Cutler invited former President Theodore Roosevelt to speak at The Cutler School. Roosevelt declined citing the "literally thousands of similar requests" that he has received. At the time he is considering running again for the Presidency against Taft.

The majority of Cutler graduates entered Harvard, Columbia, Yale, and Princeton, the numbers being in the order named. The school to 49 and 51 East 61st Street to Madison Avenue after 1913. Although the school advertised for students in October 1923, the school property at 755 Madison Avenue was sold in January 1924.

On December 31, 1917, Arthur Cutler's wife, Elizabeth Cutler (67), was badly burned in her home at 49 East 61st Street in Manhattan. She arose early in the morning and used a match to light the gas logs in the fireplace on the first floor of her home. She was wearing only a bathrobe, which ignited. She ran from the house and rolled in a snowdrift in an attempt to extinguish the flames. Her husband was asleep on the second floor of the house and didn't become aware of the incident until a policeman awoke him and advised him that his wife had been taken to Flower Hospital. She died in the hospital two days later.

On June 21, 1918, the last day of the 1917–1918 school year, Dr. Arthur Hamilton Cutler died at his home from a cerebral venous sinus thrombosis. He was 70 years old. He had been headmaster of the school for 42 years.

The school moved to 755 Madison Avenue following the death of Dr. Cutler, in 1918.

== Notable alumni ==
- Waldorf Astor, 2nd Viscount Astor, Member of Parliament
- James C. Auchincloss, politician
- Guy Wetmore Carryl, humorist and poet
- Charles A. Dana, governor of stock exchange and congressman
- Francis Burton Harrison, congressman and governor general of the Philippines
- James William Husted, speaker of the New York State assembly
- Hallett Johnson, Ambassador to Costa Rica
- Grover Loening, aviation pioneer.
- John Pierpont Morgan, Jr., banker
- Francis L. Pell, architect
- Howard Alexander Smith, senator
