= Staten Island Cricket Club =

Sports venue in New York City

Coordinates: 40°38′36″N 74°06′33″W

Randolph St. George Walker Park
- Walker Park
- Interactive map of Randolph St. George Walker Park
- Location: Livingston, Staten Island, New York, U.S.
- Owner: New York City
- Surface: Grass

Construction
- Groundbreaking: 1886
- Opened: 1931

Tenant
- Staten Island Cricket Club (NYMDAL) (1886–present)

The Staten Island Cricket Club (SICC) is a cricket club on Staten Island, New York, United States, that was incorporated as the Staten Island Cricket and Base Ball Club on March 22, 1872. It became the first tennis venue in the United States.

== History ==
The club originally played at St. George on the "Flats" or old Camp Washington Terminal from 1866 to 1886. While not the oldest cricket club in the United States, it does claim to be the oldest cricket club in continuous use since its founding in that country. Mary Outerbridge brought tennis to the club in 1874. The first national tennis tournament in America was held at the club on September 1, 1880. 'The waterfront land was known by its Civil War use as Camp Washington. It was here that Mary Ewing Outerbridge, resident of the historic area, introduced lawn tennis in the spring of 1874. Her brother Emilius helped her to set up a net and mark out a tennis court on the grounds of Camp Washington used by the Staten Island Cricket and Baseball Club. The club had to give way to Erastus Wiman's ventures at that site and move to the former Rufus King Delafield estate in the Livingston neighborhood of Staten Island about 1.8 miles (2.9 km) away from St. George. In 1906 the name of the club was changed to the Staten Island Cricket and Tennis Club, and changed again in 1931 to the Staten Island Cricket Club. In 1925 the property was sold to the Staten Island Academy then sold in 1930 to the city of New York. After the sale to city the estate was originally named Livingston Park but was later renamed Walker Park in memory of Randolph St. George Walker Jr., a casualty of World War I and son of a prominent member and officer of the club." A clubhouse on the grounds burned down in 1932, taking many of the club's records with it. The clubhouse was replaced with a Tudor style brick structure in 1934 that is still standing.

Famous cricketers that have played while visiting at the SICC include England captain Pelham Warner played there in 1903 Gilbert Jessop, Donald Bradman, Everton Weekes, and Garry Sobers. Uncorroborated club lore has it that W. G. Grace, Colin Blythe, and K. S. Ranjitsinhji also played at Walker (Livingston) Park.

Early scenes of the club can be seen in the silent film Raffles the Amateur Cracksman (1917) with John Barrymore.

== Recent activity ==
Walker Park has the SICC cricket field with cricket pitch prominently placed in the center of the park, but it also has six asphalt tennis courts in its southeast corner, a little league baseball field in its southwest corner, two basketball courts along the west, and a children's playground in the northwest corner. The cricket club uses the 1934 brick and half-timbered clubhouse in the northeast corner of the park at 50 Bard Avenue.

In the 2000s the club participated in competitive matches in the New York Metropolitan and District Association League. The Latin motto of the club is Lude Ludum Insignia Secundaria which is translated to mean "Winning the game is a secondary concern. Playing the game is a primary reward. (It's just a game...)" In popular culture it was depicted in Joseph O'Neill's novel Netherland which was a story about a New York banker shaken up by the events of September 11, 2001 who takes up cricket and starts playing at the Staten Island club.

== See also ==
- St. George Cricket Grounds was a later cricket, baseball, and lacrosse venue built at or near the club's original St. George location and used in the 1880s.
- Richmond County Bank Ballpark is a baseball and cricket ground that opened in 2001 built at or near the SICC's original St. George location.

== Bibliography ==
- Morris, Ira K. (1900). Morris's Memorial History of Staten Island New York. Vol. II. Staten Island (New York, N.Y.). p. 483. "The Staten Island Cricket and Base Ball Club, which for years was rated as... The club was incorporated in January, 1866. During the summer it was a ...The Staten Island Cricket and Base Ball Club, which for years was rated as the... had its grounds for many years at Camp Washington, or what may now be ..."
