= American Football Union =

Early American football league in New York

- Founded: January 6, 1886
- Folded: 1895
- Commissioner: Clarence M. Smith (January 6, 1886–September 27, 1888), William H. Ford (September 27, 1888, 1889-)
- Sports fielded: football
- No. of teams: 5–8 (start), 2 (final), 10–17 (total)
- Headquarters: New York City, New York
- Region: Eastern

The American Football Union (AFU) was a coalition of amateur, semi-professional, and collegiate club football teams that operated from 1886 to 1895 in the New York metropolitan area. Although the minor league was practically inconsequential and obscure in the development of professional American football, the Orange Athletic Club, who participated in the league from 1888 to 1895, would go on to become the Orange and Newark Tornadoes, and join the NFL for two seasons in 1929 and 1930.

== History ==
=== Founding ===
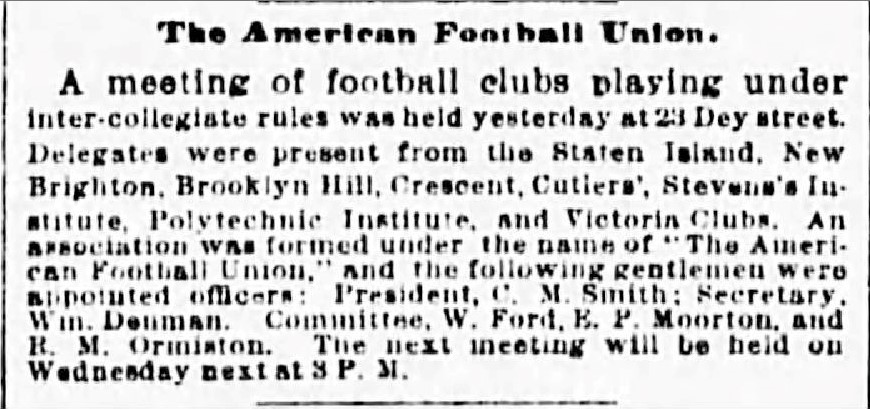
An article in The New York Sun, describing the meeting that established the American Football Union in 1886.

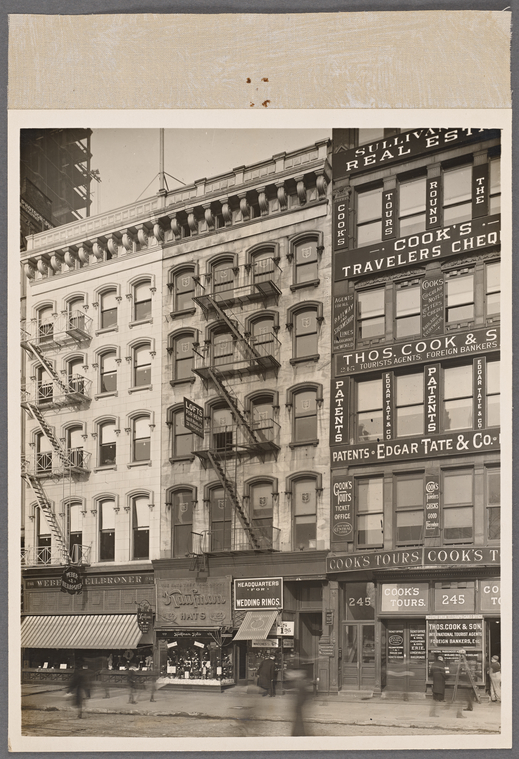
A picture of No. 243 Broadway in 1912. In 1886, this would be the site of the second meeting of the American Football Union. It would also serve as the office for AFU President Clarence M. Smith.

On January 6, 1886, representatives from several different athletic institutions across the New York metropolitan area met at 23 Dey Street in Manhattan to discuss the plausibility of a new athletic association for the sport of football. These institutions were the Staten Island, New-Brighton, Cutler, Stevens Institute, Polytechnic Institute, Brooklyn Hill, Crescent, and Victoria football clubs. The delegates of these eight athletic clubs eventually voted to form the association known as "The American Football Union". An election was held, and C. M. Smith of the Staten Island Cricket Club was chosen as the first AFU president. William Denman won secretary, and William H. Ford, E. P. Moorton, and R. M. Ormiston were appointed to the Executive Committee.

The second meeting for the fledging football association was held at 3:00 p.m. on the following Wednesday at the same site, and was focused on laying down a series of rules for the league to adopt. A committee composed of R.M Ormiston, H. C. Staniland, and H. Waldo Jr., who were the captains of the Polytechnic, Victoria, and New-Brighton athletic clubs respectively, were chosen to draft the new rules for the union. Other developments of note were arrangements for a schedule of conference matchups for the upcoming football season, as well as a trophy for whichever club won the most in-league games. A new rule was established that if any club failed to make an appearance within half an hour of their scheduled contest, they would have to forfeit the contest to the opposing team. The Brooklyn Hills and Cutler's school delegates were absent, and the Stevens Institute sent in a letter of resignation from the Union.

=== 1886 season ===
The AFU's first fall meeting was held on September 31 at No.243 Broadway Street, and welcomed representatives from the five institutions who confirmed their teams for the 1886 season. They were the Unions of Columbia College, Brooklyn Hill Football Club, Cutler School, the Spartan Harriers, and the Staten Island Football Club. The Staten Island Football Club was a consolidation of three clubs on Staten Island, the Athletic, Cricket, and Rowing associations, as well as the Clifton Athletic Club. William Halsey of the Brooklyn Hills was appointed the new secretary of the AFU, and the annual dues for membership were set at $10 (roughly $275 in 2020).

Although the first contest between two members of the AFU occurred on October 10, the first AFU sanctioned football game took place on October 16 with the Brooklyn Hills Football Club against the "Crickets of Stevens" (Stevens Institute Secondary team) at 3:30 p.m. on St. George's Cricket grounds in Hoboken, New Jersey. The Crickets won 8–6, but disputed calls by the referee resulted in the contest coming under review of the AFU Executive Committee.

For the 1886 season, the plan was for each of the representative teams to play each other twice, and whoever recorded the most wins would be given the Union pennant as champion of the league. However, much turmoil persisted around membership in the early AFU that strained this requirement. The Polytechnic Institute attended the first two meetings of the AFU but opted out of league-play because of an apparent lack of strength in their team. The New York Athletic Club was in negotiations with the Executive Committee but never committed to the $10 fee, and the Nassau Athletic Club applied for the Union and was denied. Although the Crescent Athletic Club was a founding member of the Union, they would not be considered a member for the 1886 season. The reason for this is unknown, but there was some speculation that the Athletic Club was too strong for the new organization, with the team composed of many Yale Alumni. On October 19 it was reported that the Spartan Harriers were withdrawing from the AFU effective immediately, and the Polytechnic Institute was to pick up the Harriers' schedule. It's unclear, but unlikely, that the Institute followed this request. The Cutlers, who had not played a single team in the AFU all season, resigned on October 24, with Brooklyn Hills appointed to play their remaining opponent, the Staten Island Football Club. The Hills would tie the club team 0–0 on November 13, Three days later, Brooklyn Hills would hold a club meeting and resign from the organization as well, citing an inability to complete their present schedule and frustration over having too many Saturday's without a conference matchup. By the end of the season, the AFU was composed of only three teams, the Crickets of the Stevens Institute, the Unions of Columbia College, and the Staten Island Football Club. A year later, this resignation would be blamed on an "unfair decision in a disputed game", which would allude to either their November 6 forfeit win or disputed loss to the Crickets on October 16.

At the first meeting of the new year, held in the office of AFU president Clarence Smith, the Crickets of Stevens Institute were officially and unanimously awarded the championship pennant for the 1886 season. The Crickets had compiled a 3–0 record in official league contests, and outscored their opponents by a total of 35 to 22. F. S. Sevenoak of the Crickets Club was elected as the new secretary and treasurer of the league after the resignation of William Halsey of the Brooklyn Football Club.

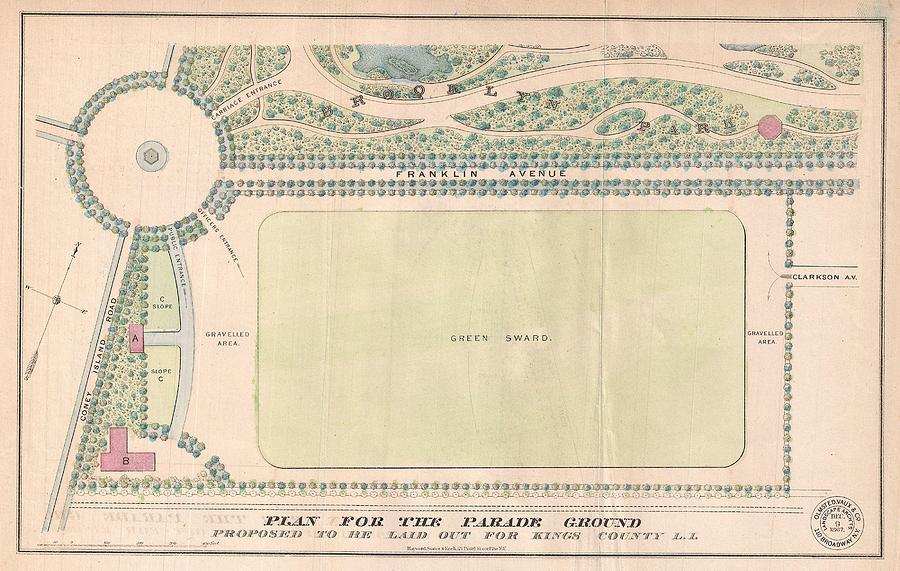
An early depiction of the Parade Ground next to Prospect Park in 1867. The Parade Grounds served as one of many venues for AFU football teams during the early years of the league.

==== 1886 Standings ====
Conf. Rank	Team	Conf. record	Overall record	PPG	PAG
1	Crickets of Stevens Institute	3–0	4–1	11.4	5.6
2	Staten Island Football Club	1–2–2	2–3–3	2.5	7.75
3 (tie)	Brooklyn Hill	0–1–2	3–5–3	6.45	12.91
3 (tie)	Unions of Columbia	1–2	1–3	7	5.75
5 (tie)	Cutler School	0–0	#–#	#	#
5 (tie)	Spartan Harriers	0–0	0–0	0	0

Key

PPG = Average of points scored per game, PAG = Average of points allowed per game

=== 1887 season ===
The Crescent Athletic Club was officially admitted to the AFU as a full member in April of the 1887 season. They would become the most dominant team in the Union over the next five seasons. A team was also formed by the Staten Island Cricket and Baseball Club, after spending a year consolidated in the Staten Island Football Club (and any players that were in the football club were then amalgamated in the cricket club). The last addition for the season was the New York Athletic Club, which entered the league to replace the Crickets of Stevens, who may have combined with the Unions of Columbia in mid-October. The Unions would last for a month before folding themselves, with some sources claiming that the team did so because of their abysmal league record. At a meeting on November 21, the AFU officially recognized the Crickets resignation from the league, but stated that the Unions of Columbia College's resignation was still "laid out on the table".

With a 6–0 record, and having not allowed a single point against them in AFU competition, the Crescent Athletic Club was officially awarded the championship pennant and the title of "Metropolitan champion" (in relation to the New York metropolitan area). The meeting for the ceremony was held at No 243 Broadway, in the office of Union President Clarence Smith, and was attended by representatives from the Crescent Athletic Club and Staten Island Cricket Club. The AFU was adjourned until Friday, March 7. It's unclear if there was one championship pennant that changed hands every time a new champion was crowned, or if the AFU had a new championship pennant for each season of competition.

=== 1888 season ===
At the first meeting of the 1888 season, held March 29 in the office of William H. Ford at No. 51 Liberty Street, a new league constitution was adopted to replace the one drafted at the second AFU meeting in 1887. The new constitution would not be as "loosely constructed" as its predecessor, and barred a common practice in the league of football players shifting from one athletic club to the next throughout the season to receive more game time. Captains of participating athletic clubs were also required to present a list of all of their players for the season. Representatives were present from the New York, Crescent, and Staten Island athletic clubs. An application for admission by the recently established Orange Athletic Club was tabled until the next meeting, held on 23 May.

With the Orange Athletic Club membership granted in May, the AFU was up to four members, and for the first time all members would stay in the Union for the entire season. On October 10 a list was released detailing the 1888 AFU schedule, a practice that had existed since 1887 but was not published in any public newspapers until then.

Crescent Athletic Club won the 1888 championship with a record identical to the 1887 season (6–0), and defeated the Orange Athletic Club in the AFU de facto championship on Thanksgiving to claim the pennant (which by now may have been called the Eagle Cup)

=== 1889 season ===
At its annual first meeting of the 1889 season, held at No. 241 (243?) Broadway, four institutions were represented, and were the same from the previous year. With President Clarence Smith away at Saratoga, vice-president William Ford would preside over the meeting, and at the AFU's annual election, he was named the new president of the Union. T. O. Spear of the Staten Island Athletic Club was elected the new vice-president, and C. T. Schlessinger of the New York athletic club was appointed to secretary and treasurer. The Union also decided to adopt the rules of the Intercollegiate Football Association, which at that time was the leading rule-making association and governing body of early football. The Flushing and Manhattan athletic clubs submitted applications for the union, but were denied on the grounds that the present members had already formed and did not need additional associations. Fifty dollars was put aside for the purchase of the season's championship pennant. Lastly, a full schedule for the season was adopted, with each athletic club playing each other twice, and each series taking place at either team's home fields.

On November 2, just before the start of the 2nd half of the AFU's conference schedule, the Staten Island Athletic Club decided to withdraw from the Union, on the grounds that the men who played were businessmen and could not find time to conduct their business and practice football at the same time. This would throw the schedule into disarray, as the Staten Island team left each of the remaining members without a game. Two options presented to fill the schedule were to completely revise it to reflect the current members or to accept the applications of the Flushing or Manhattan athletic club.

The Crescent Athletic Club repeated as Union champions for the third consecutive season, and did not allow a single point against a current AFU member for the second time in three years. The Crescent's AFU record was 6–0 (7–1 overall, with an 18–0 loss to Yale), and outscored their union opponents by a total of 196 to 0.

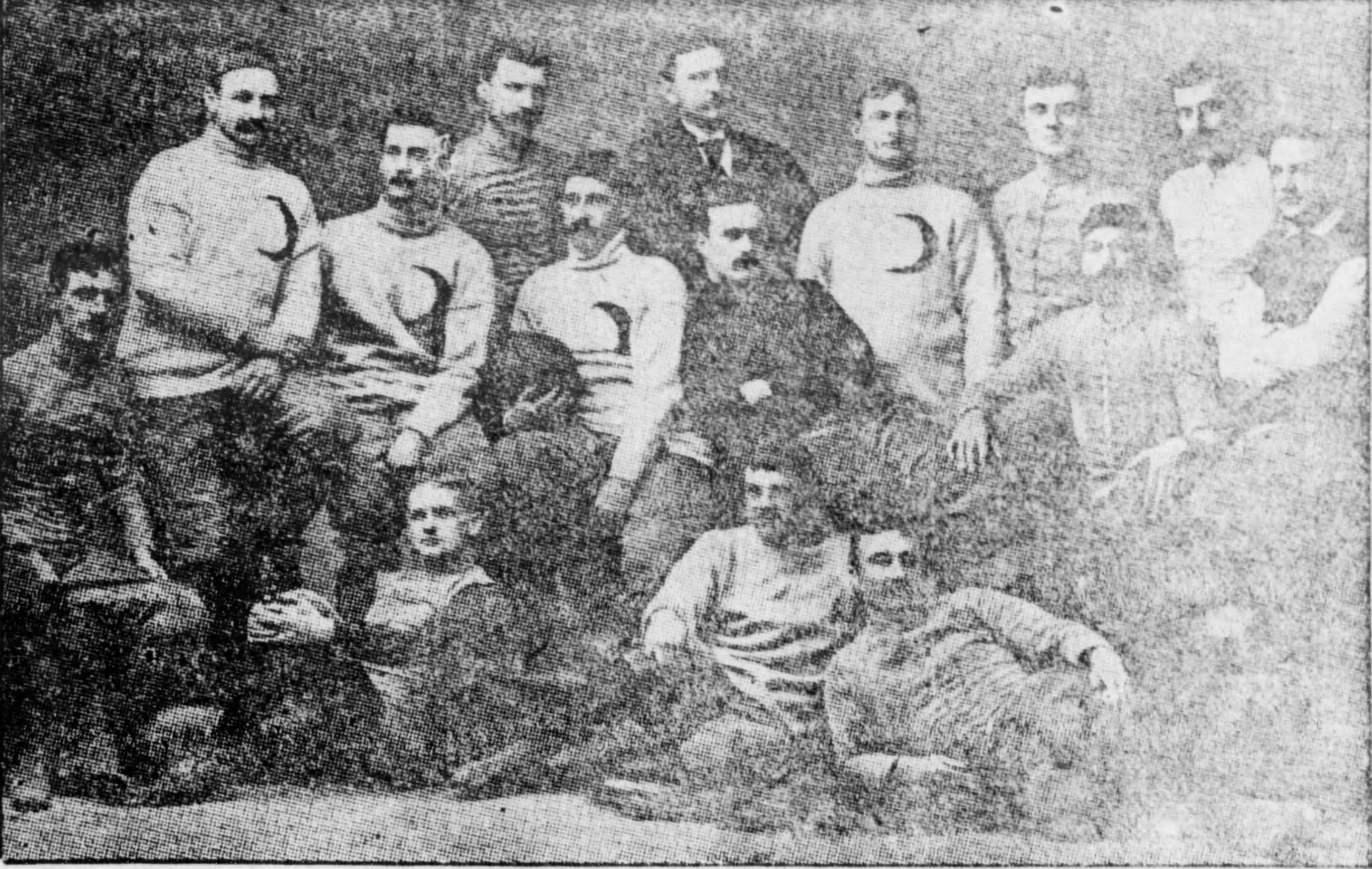
The 1889 AFU champion Crescent Athletic Club of Brooklyn.

=== 1890 season ===
In the annual first meeting of the AFU, four congregations represented the league, including the Staten Island Athletic Club that had resigned the year prior. Unfortunately, the Staten Island team soon re-resigned, leaving only the New York, Crescent, and Orange Athletic Clubs. Manhattan Athletic Club applied for the Union, and were finally accepted, but were not allowed to compete in the league until the next season.

On November 8, the Crescent and Orange Athletic Clubs met at the Orange Oval in East Orange, NJ. The Crescents entered the game with a 17–0 record against AFU members since joining the Union for the 1887 season. They had also outscored their league opponents by a total of 422 to 9, and pitched fourteen shutouts. All streaks were broken when the Oranges successfully upset the three-time reigning AFU champion, 8 to 5.

In the championship game on December 7, a rematch of the Orange and Crescent Athletic Clubs was played. Due to new league rules, the regular season games would not play a part in the decision of AFU champion, meaning that even though the Oranges had already secured a win over the Crescents it was meaningless in relation to the championship game. The Crescent Athletic Club shut out the Orange 14 to 0 at Washington Park in Brooklyn, and secured their fourth consecutive AFU championship pennant.

== Members ==
Institution	Location	Founded	Nickname	Years in AFU	Notes
Boston Athletic Association	Boston, MA	1887		1893–1894?	
**Brooklyn Hill Football Club**	Brooklyn, New York		Brooklyn Hills	1886	The Brooklyn Hills left the AFU mid-season because of a disputed call that defined the score of a league game. There was some discussion of them rejoining the Union for the 1887 season but this never materialized.
Clifton Athletic Club			Cliftons	1886 (Consolidated)	The Clifton Athletic Club was a founding member of the AFU, and was consolidated into the Staten Island Football Club for the 1886 season.
**Crescent Athletic Club**	Bay Ridge, Brooklyn, New York	1884	Crescents	1886 (DNP), 1887–1895	The Crescents were a founding institution of the AFU, attending the meetings that created the Union and ratified the league by-laws and constitution. However, they would not participate
**Crickets of Stevens Institute**	Hoboken, New Jersey	1870	Crickets	1886, 1887 (Consolidated?)	The Crickets were 1886 champions, but either consolidated with the Unions of Columbia College or disbanded entirely for the 1887 season.
Cutler School	Manhattan, New York	1876	Cutlers	1886 (DNP)	The Cutler school was a founding member and signed on for the 1886 season but never played a league opponent.
Elizabeth Athletic Club				1895?	
**Manhattan Athletic Club**	Manhattan, New York	1877		1891	Manhattan Athletic Club had been lobbying for admission to the AFU for years before the Union finally granted their membership in late November 1890. However, due to the late season entry the club was not allowed to participate in AFU games until the next year.
New Jersey Athletic Club				1895?	
**New York Athletic Club**	Manhattan, New York	1868		1887–1893	There were negotiations between the Executive Committee of the AFU and the NYAC for the 1886, but the club did not ultimately join the league until the next season.
**Orange Athletic Club**	Orange, New Jersey	1887	Oranges/Tornadoes	1888–1895	
Polytechnic Institute of Brooklyn	Brooklyn, NY	1853		1886 (DNP)	The Polytechnic Institute was a founding member, but decided not to play in the AFU for the 1886 because of their belief that their football team was not at the same level as the other members of the Union.
Spartan Harriers	Manhattan, NY?		Harriers	1886 (DNP)	The Spartan Harriers were not a founding member, but joined the Union briefly for the 1886 season before dropping out in late October with a 0–0 record. They were most likely an organization based primarily on running, and sponsored a few moonlight-chases for Brooklyn in 1886, but not much else is known.
**Staten Island Athletic Club**	West Brighton, Staten Island, New York			1886 (Consolidated), 1887 (Consolidated), 1889, 1890 (disputed)	The Staten Island Athletic Club was a founding member of the AFU, but were consolidated into the Staten Island Football Club for the 1886 season. It's possible that the club was consolidated again in the 1887 season for the Staten Island Cricket Club. After rejoining the AFU as a fully fledged member in 1889 but resigning halfway through the season, the club was expected to return to the league in 1890. They may have attended the first meeting, but did not play in any Union contests, which leaves their status in that season as disputed.
**Staten Island Cricket Club**	Livingston, Staten Island, New York	1866		1886 (Consolidated), 1887–1890	The Staten Island Cricket Club may have been a founding member of the AFU, with the list of clubs mentioning a "Staten Island" team, which could have been any of the three athletic clubs on the Island.
**Staten Island Football Club**	Staten Island, New York	1886	Islanders	1886	The Staten Island Football Club was not an independent organization, but rather an amalgamate of four separate athletic associations, the Staten Island Athletic Club, Staten Island Rowing Club, Staten Island Cricket Club, and Clifton Athletic Club of New York. They would be disbanded for the 1887 season, and any players that wished to continue with the AFU were combined into the Staten Island Cricket Club.
Staten Island Rowing Club	Staten Island, New York			1886 (Consolidated)	The Staten Island Rowing Club may have been a founding member of the AFU, and was consolidated into the Staten Island Football Club for the 1886 season.
**Union Club of Columbia College**	New York City, New York	1754	Unions	1886, 1887	The Unions resigned from the AFU midway through the 1887 season, with some reporting that the team was tired of losing. It's also possible that the team was disbanded to focus efforts on Columbia's freshmen football team, which was the only team left to represent the college for the 1887 season (Columbia did not have a Varsity football team between 1885 and 1889).
Victoria Athletic Club	New York City, NY?		Victorias	1886 (DNP)	The Victorias were a founding member of the AFU, but did not play for the league in their inaugural season. It's unlikely that they even fielded a football team.

- DNP stands for "did not play", as the football club had some association with the Union but did not play in their championship series'.
- Teams in bold played at least one AFU-sanctioned football game during their membership.

== American Football Union champions ==
- 1886- Crickets of Stevens (3–0)
- 1887- Crescent Athletic Club (6–0)
- 1888- Crescent Athletic Club (6–0)
- 1889- Crescent Athletic Club (4–0)
- 1890- Crescent Athletic Club (3–1)
- 1891- Crescent Athletic Club (3–0)
- 1892- Crescent Athletic Club (2–0)
- 1893- Orange Athletic Club (2–0)
- 1894- Orange Athletic Club (1–0)
- 1895- Orange Athletic Club, Crescent Athletic Club?
