= List of Penn Quakers football seasons =

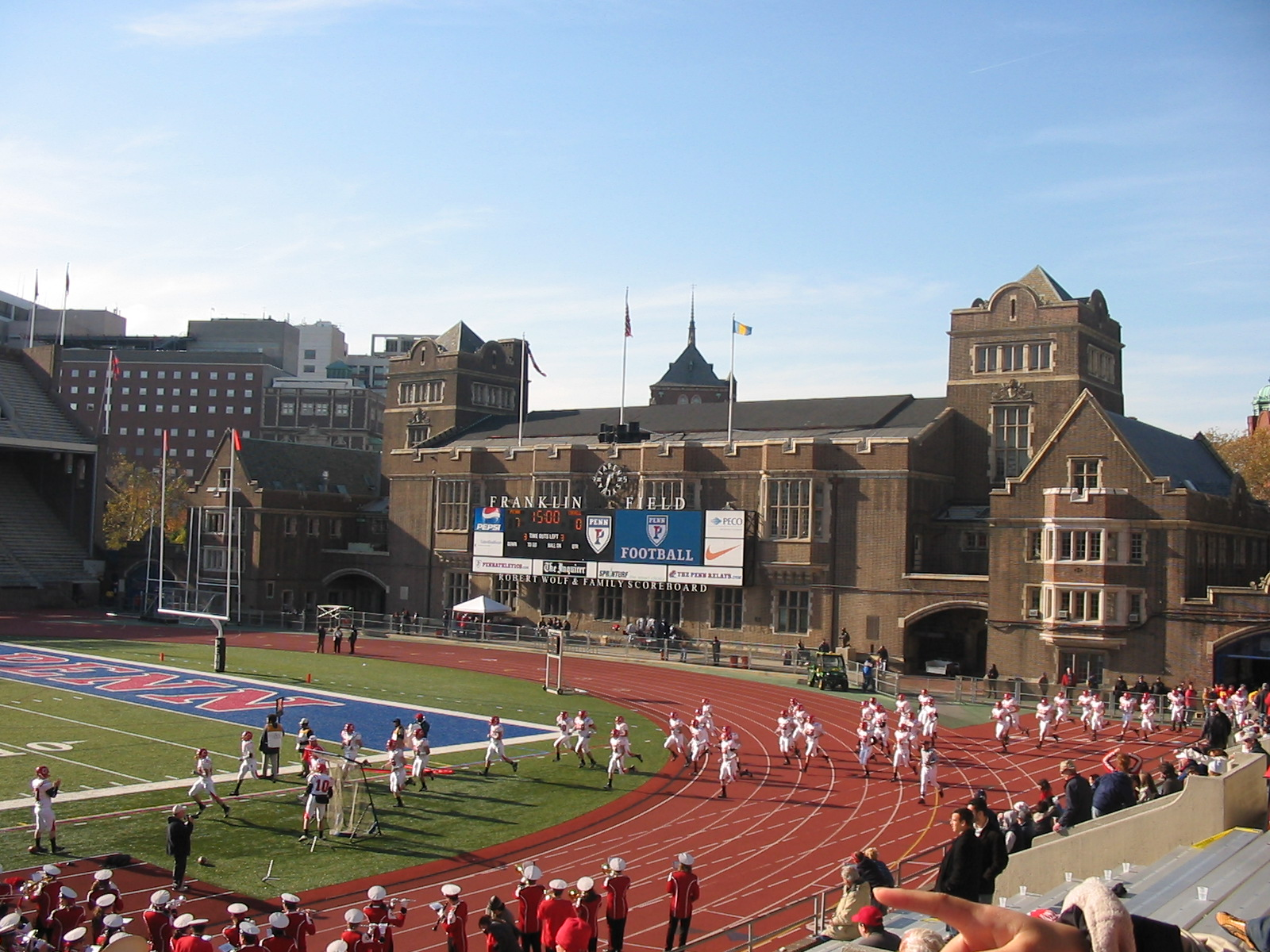
Franklin Field, where the Penn Quakers have played their home games since 1895.

This is a list of seasons completed by the Penn Quakers football team of the National Collegiate Athletic Association (NCAA) Division I Football Championship Subdivision (FCS). Since the team's first season in 1876, the Quakers have competed in nearly 1,500 officially sanctioned games, holding an all-time record of 882–519–42. Penn joined the Ivy League as a founding member in 1956.

== Seasons ==
| Year | Coach | Overall | Conference | Standing | Bowl/playoffs | Coaches^{#} | AP^{°} |
|---|---|---|---|---|---|---|---|
Independent (1876–1884)
| 1876 | No coach | 1–2 | | | | | |
| 1877 | No team | | | | | | |
| 1878 | No coach | 1–2–1 | | | | | |
| 1879 | No coach | 2–2 | | | | | |
| 1880 | No coach | 2–2 | | | | | |
| 1881 | No coach | 0–5 | | | | | |
| 1882 | No coach | 2–4 | | | | | |
| 1883 | No coach | 6–2–1 | | | | | |
| 1884 | No coach | 5–1–1 | | | | | |
Frank Dole (Independent) (1885–1887)
| 1885 | Frank Dole | 8–5 | | | | | |
| 1886 | Frank Dole | 9–7–1 | | | | | |
| 1887 | Frank Dole | 6–7 | | | | | |
Woody Wagenhorst (Independent) (1888–1891)
| 1888 | Woody Wagenhorst | 9–7 | | | | | |
| 1889 | Woody Wagenhorst | 7–6 | | | | | |
| 1890 | Woody Wagenhorst | 11–3 | | | | | |
| 1891 | Woody Wagenhorst | 11–2 | | | | | |
George Woodruff (Independent) (1892–1901)
| 1892 | George Woodruff | 15–1 | | | | | |
| 1893 | George Woodruff | 12–3 | | | | | |
| 1894 | George Woodruff | 12–0 | | | | | |
| 1895 | George Woodruff | 14–0 | | | | | |
| 1896 | George Woodruff | 14–1 | | | | | |
| 1897 | George Woodruff | 15–0 | | | | | |
| 1898 | George Woodruff | 12–1 | | | | | |
| 1899 | George Woodruff | 8–3–2 | | | | | |
| 1900 | George Woodruff | 12–1 | | | | | |
| 1901 | George Woodruff | 10–5 | | | | | |
Carl Williams (Independent) (1902–1907)
| 1902 | Carl Williams | 9–4 | | | | | |
| 1903 | Carl Williams | 9–3 | | | | | |
| 1904 | Carl Williams | 12–0 | | | | | |
| 1905 | Carl Williams | 12–0–1 | | | | | |
| 1906 | Carl Williams | 7–2–3 | | | | | |
| 1907 | Carl Williams | 11–1 | | | | | |
Sol Metzger (Independent) (1908)
| 1908 | Sol Metzger | 11–0–1 | | | | | |
Andy Smith (Independent) (1909–1912)
| 1909 | Andy Smith | 7–1–2 | | | | | |
| 1910 | Andy Smith | 9–1–1 | | | | | |
| 1911 | Andy Smith | 7–4 | | | | | |
| 1912 | Andy Smith | 7–4 | | | | | |
George Brooke (Independent) (1913–1915)
| 1913 | George Brooke | 6–3–1 | | | | | |
| 1914 | George Brooke | 4–4–1 | | | | | |
| 1915 | George Brooke | 3–5–2 | | | | | |
Bob Folwell (Independent) (1916–1919)
| 1916 | Bob Folwell | 7–3–1 | | | L Rose | | |
| 1917 | Bob Folwell | 9–2 | | | | | |
| 1918 | Bob Folwell | 5–3 | | | | | |
| 1919 | Bob Folwell | 6–2–1 | | | | | |
John Heisman (Independent) (1920–1922)
| 1920 | John Heisman | 6–4 | | | | | |
| 1921 | John Heisman | 4–3–2 | | | | | |
| 1922 | John Heisman | 6–3 | | | | | |
Lou Young (Independent) (1923–1929)
| 1923 | Lou Young | 5–4 | | | | | |
| 1924 | Lou Young | 9–1–1 | | | | | |
| 1925 | Lou Young | 7–2 | | | | | |
| 1926 | Lou Young | 7–1–1 | | | | | |
| 1927 | Lou Young | 6–4 | | | | | |
| 1928 | Lou Young | 8–1 | | | | | |
| 1929 | Lou Young | 7–2 | | | | | |
Lud Wray (Independent) (1930)
| 1930 | Lud Wray | 5–4 | | | | | |
Harvey Harman (Independent) (1931–1937)
| 1931 | Harvey Harman | 6–3 | | | | | |
| 1932 | Harvey Harman | 6–2 | | | | | |
| 1933 | Harvey Harman | 2–4–1 | | | | | |
| 1934 | Harvey Harman | 4–4 | | | | | |
| 1935 | Harvey Harman | 4–4 | | | | | |
| 1936 | Harvey Harman | 7–1 | | | | | 10 |
| 1937 | Harvey Harman | 2–5–1 | | | | | |
George Munger (Independent) (1938–1953)
| 1938 | George Munger | 3–2–3 | | | | | |
| 1939 | George Munger | 4–4 | | | | | |
| 1940 | George Munger | 6–1–1 | | | | | 14 |
| 1941 | George Munger | 7–1 | | | | | 15 |
| 1942 | George Munger | 5–3–1 | | | | | |
| 1943 | George Munger | 6–2–1 | | | | | 20 |
| 1944 | George Munger | 5–3 | | | | | |
| 1945 | George Munger | 6–2 | | | | | 8 |
| 1946 | George Munger | 6–2 | | | | | 13 |
| 1947 | George Munger | 7–0–1 | | | | | 7 |
| 1948 | George Munger | 5–3 | | | | | |
| 1949 | George Munger | 4–4 | | | | | |
| 1950 | George Munger | 6–3 | | | | | |
| 1951 | George Munger | 5–4 | | | | | |
| 1952 | George Munger | 4–3–2 | | | | | |
| 1953 | George Munger | 3–5–1 | | | | | |
Steve Sebo (Independent) (1954–1955)
| 1954 | Steve Sebo | 0–9 | | | | | |
| 1955 | Steve Sebo | 0–9 | | | | | |
Steve Sebo (Ivy League) (1956–1959)
| 1956 | Steve Sebo | 4–5 | 4–3 | T–3rd | | | |
| 1957 | Steve Sebo | 3–6 | 3–4 | T–4th | | | |
| 1958 | Steve Sebo | 4–5 | 4–3 | T–4th | | | |
| 1959 | Steve Sebo | 7–1–1 | 6–1 | 1st | | | |
John Stiegman (Ivy League) (1960–1964)
| 1960 | John Stiegman | 3–6 | 2–5 | 6th | | | |
| 1961 | John Stiegman | 2–7 | 1–6 | 7th | | | |
| 1962 | John Stiegman | 3–6 | 2–5 | 6th | | | |
| 1963 | John Stiegman | 3–6 | 1–6 | 8th | | | |
| 1964 | John Stiegman | 1–8 | 0–7 | 8th | | | |
Bob Odell (Ivy League) (1965–1970)
| 1965 | Bob Odell | 4–4–1 | 2–4–1 | 6th | | | |
| 1966 | Bob Odell | 2–7 | 1–6 | 7th | | | |
| 1967 | Bob Odell | 3–6 | 2–5 | 6th | | | |
| 1968 | Bob Odell | 7–2 | 5–2 | 3rd | | | |
| 1969 | Bob Odell | 4–5 | 2–5 | T–5th | | | |
| 1970 | Bob Odell | 4–5 | 2–5 | 6th | | | |
Harry Gamble (Ivy League) (1971–1980)
| 1971 | Harry Gamble | 2–7 | 1–6 | 7th | | | |
| 1972 | Harry Gamble | 6–3 | 4–3 | T–3rd | | | |
| 1973 | Harry Gamble | 6–3 | 5–2 | T–2nd | | | |
| 1974 | Harry Gamble | 6–2–1 | 4–2–1 | 3rd | | | |
| 1975 | Harry Gamble | 3–6 | 2–5 | T–6th | | | |
| 1976 | Harry Gamble | 3–6 | 2–5 | T–5th | | | |
| 1977 | Harry Gamble | 5–4 | 4–3 | T–3rd | | | |
| 1978 | Harry Gamble | 2–6–1 | 1–5–1 | 8th | | | |
| 1979 | Harry Gamble | 0–9 | 0–7 | 8th | | | |
| 1980 | Harry Gamble | 1–9 | 1–6 | 7th | | | |
Jerry Berndt (Ivy League) (1981–1985)
| 1981 | Jerry Berndt | 1–9 | 1–6 | T–7th | | | |
| 1982 | Jerry Berndt | 7–3 | 5–2 | T–1st | | | |
| 1983 | Jerry Berndt | 6–3–1 | 5–1–1 | T–1st | | | |
| 1984 | Jerry Berndt | 8–1 | 7–0 | 1st | | | |
| 1985 | Jerry Berndt | 7–2–1 | 6–1 | 1st | | | |
Ed Zubrow (Ivy League) (1986–1988)
| 1986 | Ed Zubrow | 10–0 | 7–0 | 1st | | | 7 |
| 1987 | Ed Zubrow | 4–6 | 3–4 | 6th | | | |
| 1988 | Ed Zubrow | 9–1 | 6–1 | T–1st | | | |
Gary Steele (Ivy League) (1989–1991)
| 1989 | Gary Steele | 4–6 | 2–5 | T–5th | | | |
| 1990 | Gary Steele | 3–7 | 3–4 | T–4th | | | |
| 1991 | Gary Steele | 2–8 | 2–5 | 6th | | | |
Al Bagnoli (Ivy League) (1992–2014)
| 1992 | Al Bagnoli | 7–3 | 5–2 | 3rd | | | |
| 1993 | Al Bagnoli | 10–0 | 7–0 | 1st | | | 16 |
| 1994 | Al Bagnoli | 9–0 | 7–0 | 1st | | | 14 |
| 1995 | Al Bagnoli | 7–3 | 5–2 | T–2nd | | | |
| 1996 | Al Bagnoli | 5–5 | 3–4 | 5th | | | |
| 1997 | Al Bagnoli | 0–4 (Note: Penn forfeited 5 conference wins due to the use of ineligible players, leading to an official record of 1–9 (0–7).) | 0–2 | 3rd | | | |
| 1998 | Al Bagnoli | 8–2 | 6–1 | 1st | | | |
| 1999 | Al Bagnoli | 5–5 | 4–3 | 4th | | | |
| 2000 | Al Bagnoli | 7–3 | 6–1 | 1st | | | |
| 2001 | Al Bagnoli | 8–1 | 6–1 | 2nd | | | 24 |
| 2002 | Al Bagnoli | 9–1 | 7–0 | 1st | | | 17 |
| 2003 | Al Bagnoli | 10–0 | 7–0 | 1st | | | 12 |
| 2004 | Al Bagnoli | 8–2 | 6–1 | 2nd | | | 21 |
| 2005 | Al Bagnoli | 5–5 | 3–4 | 6th | | | |
| 2006 | Al Bagnoli | 5–5 | 3–4 | T–4th | | | |
| 2007 | Al Bagnoli | 4–6 | 3–4 | T–4th | | | |
| 2008 | Al Bagnoli | 6–4 | 5–2 | T–3rd | | | |
| 2009 | Al Bagnoli | 8–2 | 7–0 | 1st | | 23 | 20 |
| 2010 | Al Bagnoli | 9–1 | 7–0 | 1st | | 16 | 18 |
| 2011 | Al Bagnoli | 5–5 | 4–3 | T–2nd | | | |
| 2012 | Al Bagnoli | 6–4 | 6–1 | 1st | | | |
| 2013 | Al Bagnoli | 4–6 | 3–4 | T–4th | | | |
| 2014 | Al Bagnoli | 2–8 | 2–5 | 6th | | | |
Ray Priore (Ivy League) (2015–present)
| 2015 | Ray Priore | 7–3 | 6–1 | T–1st | | | |
| 2016 | Ray Priore | 7–3 | 6–1 | T–1st | | | |
| 2017 | Ray Priore | 6–4 | 4–3 | 4th | | | |
| 2018 | Ray Priore | 6–4 | 3–4 | 4th | | | |
| 2019 | Ray Priore | 5–5 | 3–4 | T–4th | | | |
| 2020 | No team (Note: Penn did not compete during the 2020 season as a result of the COVID-19 pandemic and the subsequent cancellation of the Ivy League season.) | | | | | | |
| 2021 | Ray Priore | 3–7 | 1–6 | T–6th | | | |
| 2022 | Ray Priore | 8–2 | 5–2 | T–2nd | | | |
| 2023 | Ray Priore | 6–4 | 3–4 | T–5th | | | |
| 2024 | Ray Priore | 4–6 | 2–5 | T–6th | | | |
| 2025 | Ray Priore | 6–4 | 4–3 | T–3rd | | | |
| Total: | | 882–519–42 | | | | | |
National championship Conference title Conference division title or championship game berth
^{†}Indicates Bowl Coalition, Bowl Alliance, BCS, or CFP / New Years' Six bowl.; ^{#}Rankings from final Coaches Poll.

== See also ==
- List of Ivy League football standings
