= Henry Lamar =

Henry Lamar may refer to:

- Henry G. Lamar (1798–1861), United States representative, lawyer and jurist from Georgia
- Henry Lamar (American football) (1906–1985), American college boxing coach, college football coach, and boxing executive
- Tillie Lamar (Henry Cummings Lamar, 1865–1891), college football player
