= 1885 Crescent Athletic Club football team =

American college football season

1885 Crescent Athletic Club football
- Conference: Independent
- Record: 3–1

The 1885 Crescent Athletic Club football team was an American football team that represented Brooklyn's Crescent Athletic Club during the 1885 college football season. The team compiled a 3–1 record.

== Schedule ==
Date	Opponent	Site	Result	Attendance	Source
October 31	Polytechnic Institute and Brooklyn Hill	Prospect Park; Brooklyn, NY	W 12–0		
November 3	at Yale	Yale Field; New Haven, CT	L 0–52		
November 14	Brooklyn Hill	Washington Park; Brooklyn, NY	W 10–4		
November 26	Brooklyn Hill	Washington Park; Brooklyn, NY	W 10–6	200–300	
