= Thomas McNeil =

Thomas McNeil may refer to:

- Thomas H. McNeil (1860–1932), American football player and lawyer
- Tom McNeil (1929–2020), Australian rules footballer and politician
