= 1885 Michigan Wolverines football team =

American college football season

1885 Michigan Wolverines football
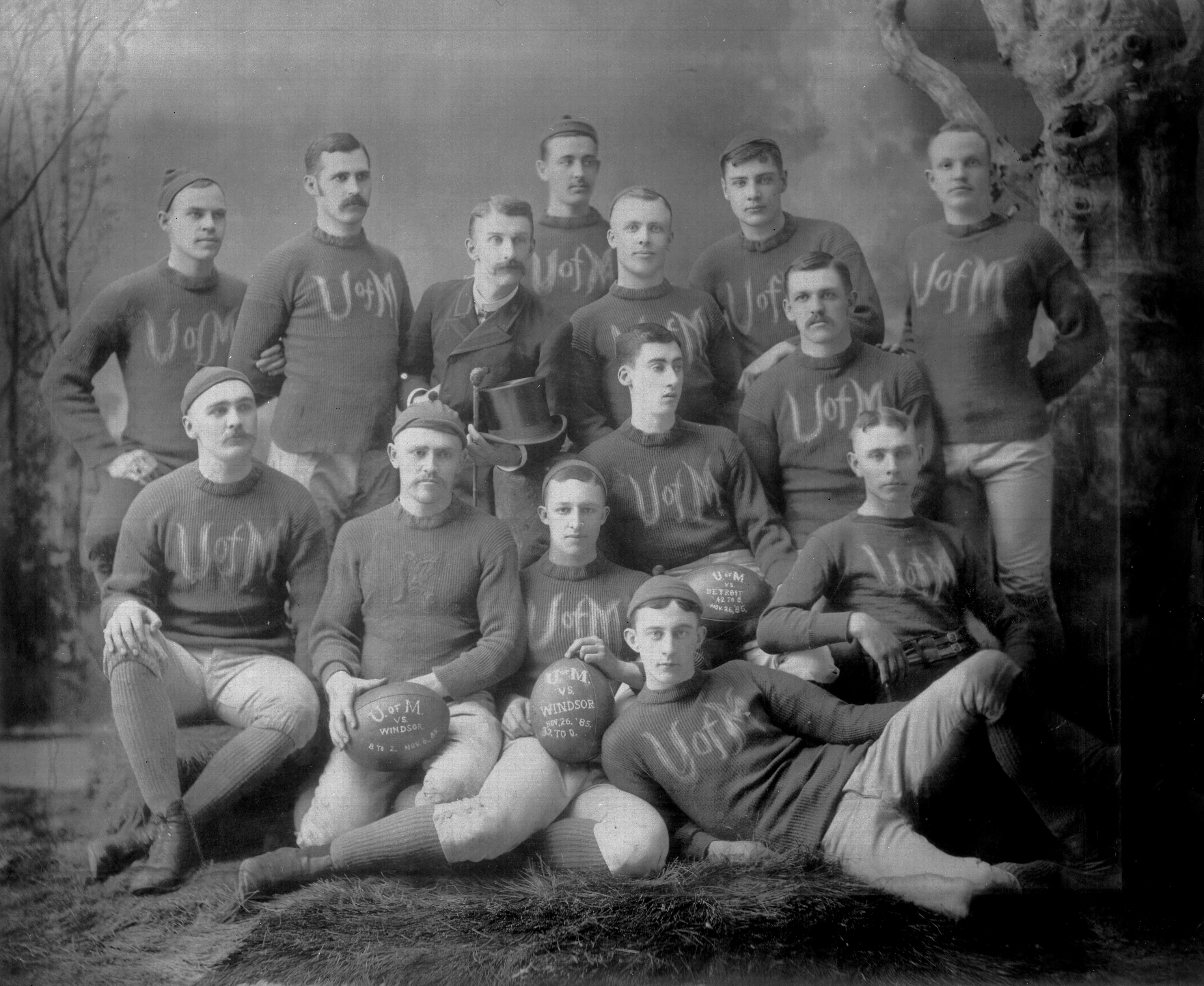
- Conference: Independent
- Record: 3–0
- Head coach: None
- Captain: Horace Greely Prettyman
- Home stadium: Campus playing field

1885 college football records
	Conf.			Overall
Team	W	L	T	W		L		T
Princeton		–		9	–	0	–	0
Michigan		–		3	–	0	–	0
Colorado College		–		1	–	0	–	0
Yale		–		7	–	1	–	0
Cincinnati		–		1	–	0	–	1
Penn		–		8	–	5	–	0
Lafayette		–		3	–	2	–	1
Massachusetts		–		3	–	2	–	1
Johns Hopkins		–		2	–	2	–	0
Richmond		–		1	–	1	–	0
Wesleyan		–		3	–	4	–	0
Navy		–		1	–	2	–	0
Lehigh		–		1	–	5	–	1
Rutgers		–		0	–	1	–	0
Fordham		–		0	–	3	–	0

The 1885 Michigan Wolverines football team represented the University of Michigan in the 1885 college football season. The team compiled a 3–0 record and outscored its opponents by a combined score of 82 to 2. The team captain was Horace Greely Prettyman.

The season began with a home-and-away series against a team from Windsor, Ontario, Canada. The first game was played in Windsor under Canadian rules (allowing 15 men on the field per side), and was the second and final football game played by a Michigan football team in a foreign country. The return game against Windsor was the first to be played on the University of Michigan campus, prior home games having been played at the Ann Arbor Fairgrounds. The team concluded the season with a 42–0 victory on Thanksgiving Day against the Peninsular Cricket Club team from Detroit.

== Schedule ==
Date	Time	Opponent	Site	Result	Attendance
November 7		at Windsor	Windsor, ON, Canada	W 8–2	
November 14	3:45 p.m.	Windsor	University of Michigan campus; Ann Arbor, MI	W 32–0	
November 26	3:15 p.m.	at Peninsular Cricket Club	Peninsular Cricket Grounds; Detroit, MI	W 42–0	200

== Season summary ==
=== Pre-season ===
With several veteran players returning from the undefeated 1884 team, expectations were high for the 1885 team. The returning players included James E. Duffy, Horace Greely Prettyman, John M. Jaycox, Thomas H. McNeil, and Raymond W. Beach. On October 4, 1885, The Michigan Argonaut (a University of Michigan weekly newspaper) wrote: "From this number there is no reason why an eleven cannot be made up which will equal any Rugby team the university ever had. With the good material now present, we may expect some interesting games before the fall season closes."

One of the challenges facing the 1885 team was the lack of other college and university teams in proximity to Ann Arbor. Other major colleges and universities in the region had not yet established regular varsity football programs: Notre Dame, Purdue, Indiana, and Penn State did so in 1887; Northwestern in 1888; Iowa, Ohio State and Wisconsin in 1889; and Nebraska, Illinois, Pittsburgh, and Missouri in 1890. In 1881 and 1883, Michigan had traveled to the east coast to play games against the major college teams of that region. In the absence of such a trip, Michigan was left with the option of playing Albion College (the only other established collegiate program in Michigan during the 1880s) and club teams from Detroit, Chicago, and even Windsor, Ontario.

=== Football on roller skates ===
In March 1885, the Princess football team of Detroit challenged Michigan to a football game on roller skates to be played at a roller rink in Ann Arbor. In mid-March 1885, The Michigan Argonaut reported: "The Rugby team are [sic] now practicing football on rollers." The two teams ultimately met on April 3, 1885, for a Friday night game "on rollers" at the Palace Rink. The Wolverines defeated the Princess team "in two straight innings". The game is not recorded as an official game in Michigan's football records.

=== At Windsor ===
On November 7, 1885, Michigan officially began its season with an 8–2 victory over the Windsor team from the Ontario Rugby Football Union (ORFU), a league that was instrumental in the development of Canadian football. (The Ottawa, Toronto and Hamilton teams in the Canadian Football League began as members of the ORFU.). The Windsor team had advanced to the second round of the ORFU playoffs in 1883.

The game was played in Windsor, Ontario, under Canadian rules. The match was Michigan's second game played in Canada, the first having been a victory over the University of Toronto in 1880. The Canadian rules allowed each team to have 15 men on the field. In addition, the ball was not snapped back from the line, but was instead "dribbled until it is out of the rush."

The Chronicle (a University of Michigan weekly newspaper) noted that the team played well despite being unacquainted with the Windsor rules. The Michigan Argonaut credited the victory to James E. Duffy: "The game was practically won by Duffy who in the middle of the first inning succeeded in kicking a goal from in field, thus scoring six points." The intermission was called at 4:30 p.m. with Michigan leading 8–0. After a 15-minute break, the game resumed at 4:45 p.m., and Windsor scored two points on "rouges", described in The Chronicle as follows: "Michigan made a rouge; one point for Windsor. . . . The ball went out of bounds and on being thrown in, a rouge was made by Michigan." The game was eventually stopped because of darkness. The Michigan Argonaut called the victory "a flattering one, as being entirely unacquainted with the Canadian rules, our team expected to be defeated."

The Windsor team hosted a banquet for the Michigan team at the British American Hotel. The Michigan lineup against Windsor consisted of Muir (goalkeeper), Jaycox and Duffy (halfbacks), McNeil and Bishop (quarterbacks), Prettyman, Skinner, Hetzler, Bumps, Kennedy, Morrow, Banks, Trowbridge, Beach and Higgins (rushers). E. L. Dorn and Hastings were umpires, and Morton of Windsor was the referee.

=== Windsor ===
Michigan's second game of the 1885 season was a return game against Windsor on November 14, 1885. The game, originally set to be played at the Ann Arbor Fairgrounds, was instead played on the campus. It was the first football game played on Michigan's campus, and The Michigan Argonaut applauded the Rugby Association's decision to move the game to the campus: "The distance to the [Fair grounds] has constantly been urged as an argument favoring such a change, to say nothing of the impossibility of playing an errorless game on such wretched turf. . . . A game on the campus has all the spirit of genuine college playing and it is to be hoped that the experiment undertaken by the present Association will have the hearty encouragement of all who enjoy a lively college game."

The game was played under American intercollegiate rules, putting the Canadians at a disadvantage. Michigan won the game, 32–0. The Windsor team had sent a telegram canceling the game, but Edward L. Dorn, the president of the Michigan Rugby Association, traveled to Windsor on the morning of the scheduled game, and "a team was picked up, somewhat inferior to the team which met our boys at Windsor last week."

The game was played in two innings with the first inning beginning at 3:45 p.m. and ending at 4:20 p.m. Horace Prettyman scored a touchdown in the first inning. At the intermission between innings, Michigan led 8–0. The Wolverines added 24 points in the second inning, with James E. Duffy and Horace Prettyman serving as the principal ball carriers. Skinner and McNeil scored touchdowns for Michigan.

After the game, the Michigan Rugby Association hosted the Windsor team at a banquet at Hangsterfer's (referred to in The Michigan Argonaut as "Hank's parlors"). T. H. McNeil served as toastmaster and called on Horace Prettyman to speak on the topic of "Foot-ball", and then on a Windsor player to speak about "The Social Features of Foot-ball". The banquet reportedly featured "roast turkey a la Ann Arbor" and "'Miss Ann Arbor kisses,' well suited to tempt the Canadian appetite." The banquet continued until midnight with the evening "passed in singing college songs and general conversation." With the lack of large colleges making it difficult to arrange games under the inter-collegiate rules, one of the topics discussed at the banquet was a proposal that Michigan learn the Canadian rules to enable it to play games more readily against the teams from Windsor, Toronto, and Hamilton.

The captain and star of the Windsor team was a player named William Parkyn III. In early January 1886, The Michigan Argonaut reported that Parkyn had become ill with malarial fever after returning from Ann Arbor, and had died a short time later. The Argonaut wrote: "The Windsor team has lost a good player, and foot-ball, a warm friend and advocate."

Michigan's lineup for the home game against Windsor was Morrow, Higgins, McNeil (quarterback), Prettyman (halfback), J. L. Banks, J. L. Duffy (goalkeeper), J. E. Duffy (halfback), Bumps, Bishop, and Skinner. The referee was Michigan's national intercollegiate champion sprinter, Frederick N. Bonine, and the umpires were Dorn and Bartlett.

=== At Peninsular Cricket Club ===
The Wolverines concluded their season with a Thanksgiving Day football game in Detroit. Michigan defeated the Peninsular Cricket Club team by a score of 42–0. The Peninsular Cricket Club began as a cricket club in 1858' but by 1885 it had evolved into the city's leading all-purpose athletic club, featuring baseball, tennis, and bicycling. In 1887, it would become part of the new Detroit Athletic Club. The 1885 football game was played at the Peninsular Cricket Grounds near Woodward Avenue and started at 3:15 p.m. Because of "bitter cold" weather, the game attracted only about 200 spectators.

Michigan took a 16–0 lead in the first inning with four touchdowns, a field goal (kicked by J. E. Duffy), and two rouges. The Wolverines added 26 points in the second inning, including touchdowns by Prettyman and McNeil. The Detroit Free Press wrote that the game was a mismatch:

"It was evident from the start that the Detroit team were no match for the others, nearly all the men being very light, while the visitors were all of good size and strong build. In play there was more disparity still, the Detroits showing no kicking ability at all, the result being a game made up very largely of scrimmaging . . ."

The Chronicle wrote that J. L. Duffy and Horace Prettyman "did the best work" for Michigan and noted that the Michigan players "immediately showed their superiority, both in running and rushing, by rapidly carrying the ball toward their opponent's goal." The Michigan Argonaut concluded that the victory was the result of a heavier team and "careful practice", and noted that the best features of the game were "some fine runs by Prettyman and good kicking by Duffy."

The Michigan lineup against the Detroit team consisted of J. E. Duffy (goalkeeper), J. M. Jaycox and J. L. Duffy (backs), N. Banks, T. H. McNeil, and H. G. Prettyman (halfbacks), and Wm. Morrow, F. F. Bumps, J. L. Skinner, C. D. Wright, L. F. Gottschalk, F. G. Higgins, G. C. Higgins, J. McNaughton and H. G. Hetzler (forwards). E. L. Dorn and Belcher (of Montreal) served as umpires, and T. M. Morton (of Windsor) was the referee. Approximately 40 Michigan students attended the game.

At the conclusion of the season, The Chronicle published an editorial urging the University to send its football team to the east on an annual basis. The newspaper also criticized the strength of the teams defeated in 1885:

"[I]f it were regularly understood that our eleven and our nine were to go east every year, our under-graduate material would be brought forward and men who now never venture on the ball field would be so anxious to try for the nine or the eleven, that there is small doubt that such teams could be picked as would win victories in the east and return with laurels won from more than one eastern competitor, instead of deeming it their greatest victory to beat a club composed of men in Detroit who play without practice."

== Players ==
=== Varsity letter winners ===
- Charles N. Banks, New Buffalo, Michigan – forward
- Raymond Walter Beach, Atwood, Michigan – forward
- Frank F. Bumps, Shelby, Michigan – forward
- James E. Duffy, Ann Arbor, Michigan – halfback
- John L. Duffy, Ann Arbor, Michigan – goalkeeper
- Frank G. Higgins, Butte, Montana – forward
- John M. Jaycox, Philadelphia, Pennsylvania – halfback
- Thomas H. McNeil, Burdette, Montana – quarterback
- William M. Morrow, Union City, Pennsylvania – forward
- Horace Greely Prettyman, Bryan, Ohio – forward
- James L. Skinner, St. Johns, Michigan – forward

=== Others ===
- Luther Fred Gottschalk, Columbus, Nebraska – substitute
- Howard George Hetzler, Waterloo, Iowa – substitute
- George C. Higgins – forward
- Carl Sears Kennedy – rusher
- James McNaughton – forward
- William R. Trowbridge – substitute rusher
- Charles D. Wright, Minneapolis, Minnesota – substitute
