= Frederick S. Jones =

American academic (1862–1944)

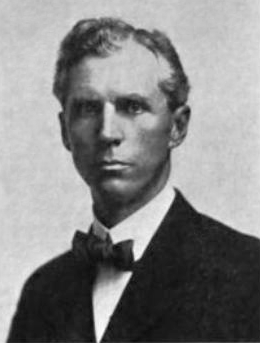

Biographical details
- Born: April 7, 1862; Palmyra, Missouri, U.S.
- Died: January 14, 1944 (aged 81); Hamden, Connecticut, U.S.

Coaching career (HC unless noted)
- 1886–1888: Minnesota

Head coaching record
- Overall: 3–3

Frederick Scheetz Jones (April 7, 1862 – January 14, 1944) was an American university professor, dean, and college football coach. He was the first physics teacher at the University of Minnesota and the school's second football coach, known as the "father of Minnesota football". Following his time as coach, Jones continued his involvement in athletics. He helped secure land and funding for Northrop Field, the program's first true home field. He also signed Henry L. Williams to be the new head football coach at Minnesota in 1900.

Jones was born in Palmyra, Missouri and attended Shattuck-Saint Mary's in Faribault, Minnesota. After graduating from Yale University with the class of 1884, Jones taught history and elocution at Shattuck. He then taught physics at the University of Minnesota before spending two years in Europe, studying at the University of Berlin and ETH Zurich. He returned to the University of Minnesota in 1889 as professor of physics and electricity. From 1902 to 1909, he was the dean of the School of Engineering at Minnesota. Jones received a Legum Doctor degree from the University of Kansas in 1909. He was the dean of Yale College from 1909 until his retirement in 1927. Jones died on January 14, 1944, as his home in Hamden, Connecticut.

== Head coaching record ==
Year	Team	Overall	Conference	Standing	Bowl/playoffs
Minnesota Golden Gophers (Independent) (1886–1888)
1886	Minnesota	0–2			
1887	Minnesota	2–0			
1888	Minnesota	1–1			
Minnesota:		3–3			
Total:		3–3			
