= 1885 Navy Midshipmen football team =

American college football season

1885 Navy Midshipmen football
- Conference: Independent
- Record: 1–2
- Head coach: None
- Captain: Cornelius Billings
- Home stadium: Western King Field

1885 college football records
	Conf.			Overall
Team	W	L	T	W		L		T
Princeton		–		9	–	0	–	0
Michigan		–		3	–	0	–	0
Colorado College		–		1	–	0	–	0
Yale		–		7	–	1	–	0
Cincinnati		–		1	–	0	–	1
Penn		–		8	–	5	–	0
Lafayette		–		3	–	2	–	1
Massachusetts		–		3	–	2	–	1
Johns Hopkins		–		2	–	2	–	0
Richmond		–		1	–	1	–	0
Wesleyan		–		3	–	4	–	0
Navy		–		1	–	2	–	0
Lehigh		–		1	–	5	–	1
Rutgers		–		0	–	1	–	0
Fordham		–		0	–	3	–	0

The 1885 Navy Midshipmen football team represented the United States Naval Academy in the 1885 college football season. The team was the fourth intercollegiate football squad to represent the United States Naval Academy, and marked the first time that the school played a multiple-game season. The squad was captained by halfback Cornelius Billings. The year began with a blowout victory over St. John's College, but was followed by close losses to Johns Hopkins University and the Princeton Tigers reserves squad. The season continued a seven-season, eight game rivalry between the Naval Academy and Johns Hopkins, and began a ten-game, seven-year rivalry with St. John's.

== Schedule ==
Date	Opponent	Site	Result	Source
November 21	St. John's (MD)	Unknown; Annapolis, MD	W 46–10	
November 26	Johns Hopkins	Unknown; Annapolis, MD (rivalry)	L 8-12	
November 28	Princeton reserve team	Unknown; Annapolis, MD	L 0-10	

== Prelude ==
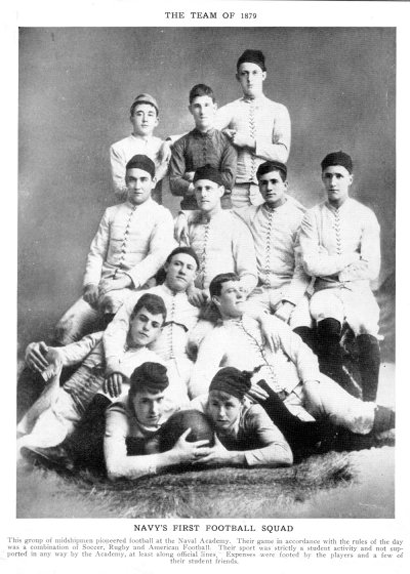
The 1879 team was the Academy's first to play an outside team

According to Ellsworth P. Bertholf's biographer C. Douglas Kroll, the first evidence of a form of football at the United States Naval Academy came in 1857, but the school's cadets lost interest in the game shortly afterward. The Naval Academy's first ever football team was fielded in 1879. The squad was entirely student-operated, receiving no official support from Naval Academy officials. The team was entirely funded by its members and their fellow students. The 1879 team participated in just one game, which resulted in a scoreless tie. It was played against the Baltimore Athletic Club, apparently on the Academy superintendent's cow pasture. Navy would not field a football team in 1880 or 1881, due to the lack of support from officials. When football returned to the academy in 1882, the squad was led by player-coach Vaulx Carter, and won 8–0 in a match with Johns Hopkins, starting a seven-year rivalry between the schools. The 1883 season resulted in Navy's first ever loss, a 2–0 defeat by Johns Hopkins. Navy returned the favor the following year, defeating Hopkins in a close 9–6 game.

== Season summary ==
The Naval Academy scheduled three games for the 1885 season, breaking from the tradition of playing only Johns Hopkins. According to Morris Allison Bealle, "Football at Annapolis had shed its swaddling clothes when the autumn of 1885 rolled around. Some of the faculty actually gave in and admitted that football might, at that, be or become an interesting diversion" so the squad was allowed to schedule three games. The first was played against St. John's College, also located in Annapolis. The game kicked off a brief rivalry with St. John's, which would conclude in 1911 with Navy winning eighteen of twenty-one contests. The 1885 match was a 46–10 blowout victory over St. John's. The second game of the season was the annual Thanksgiving Day match against Johns Hopkins. After winning the previous year, Navy fell to Johns Hopkins 12–8. The season concluded with the Naval Academy challenging the Princeton freshman team, a game which ended in a 10–0 shutout loss for Navy.

== Players ==
The 1885 Naval Academy team was made up of thirteen players at four different positions. The squad consisted of seven rushers, two fullback, three halfbacks, and a quarterback:

Rushers

- George Hayward
- Sam Darby
- Tom Jewett
- Joe Ricketts
- Fred Moore
- Clarence Stone
- John Ubsdell

Quarterback

- Bill Faust

Fullbacks

- Joe Welsh
- George Loyall

Halfbacks

- Julius Dashiell
- Cornelius Billings (capt.)
- Bill Cloke

== Postseason and aftermath ==
The first postseason college football game would not be played until 1902, with the Pasadena Tournament of Roses' establishment of the east–west tournament game, later known as the Rose Bowl. The Midshipmen would not participate in their first Rose Bowl until the 1923 season, when they went 5–1–2 and tied with the Washington Huskies 14–14 in the match. As a result of the lack of a competition, there were no postseason games played after the 1885 season. According to statistics compiled by Billingsly, Houlgate, the National Championship Foundation, Parke Davis, and the Helms Athletic Foundation, Princeton was declared the 1885 season champion.

The 1885 season brought Navy's overall win–loss record to an even 3–3–1. It also brought the Academy's record against Johns Hopkins to 2–2 tie. The season marked the first time a team for the Naval Academy would play a multiple-game season. In 1886, their schedule was expanded from three games to five, and continued to grow through subsequent years. It was the worst single-season record for the Academy until 1888, when they went 1–4. Navy would finish the 1880s with four winning seasons, and an overall record of 14–12–2. The school would outscore their opponents 292–231, and would finish the 19th century with an overall record of 54–19–3.
