= 1886 Michigan Wolverines football team =

American college football season

1886 Michigan Wolverines football
- Conference: Independent
- Record: 2–0
- Head coach: None
- Captain: Horace Greely Prettyman
- Home stadium: Ann Arbor Fairgrounds

1886 Midwestern college football independents records
	Conf.			Overall
Team	W	L	T	W		L		T
Cincinnati		–		2	–	0	–	0
Michigan		–		2	–	0	–	0
Wabash		–		2	–	0	–	1
Albion		–		1	–	2	–	0
Northwestern		–		0	–	1	–	0
Minnesota		–		0	–	2	–	0

The 1886 Michigan Wolverines football team represented the University of Michigan in the 1886 college football season. The team played only two games, both against Albion College. Michigan won both games by a combined score of 74 to 0. Charles D. Wright, a senior from Minneapolis, Minnesota, scored six touchdowns in the first game. The manager and goalkeeper was John L. Duffy, a senior from Ann Arbor.

== Schedule ==
Date	Opponent	Site	Result
October 16	at Albion	Albion, MI	W 50–0
October 30	Albion	Ann Arbor Fairgrounds; Ann Arbor, MI	W 24–0

== Horace Prettyman ==
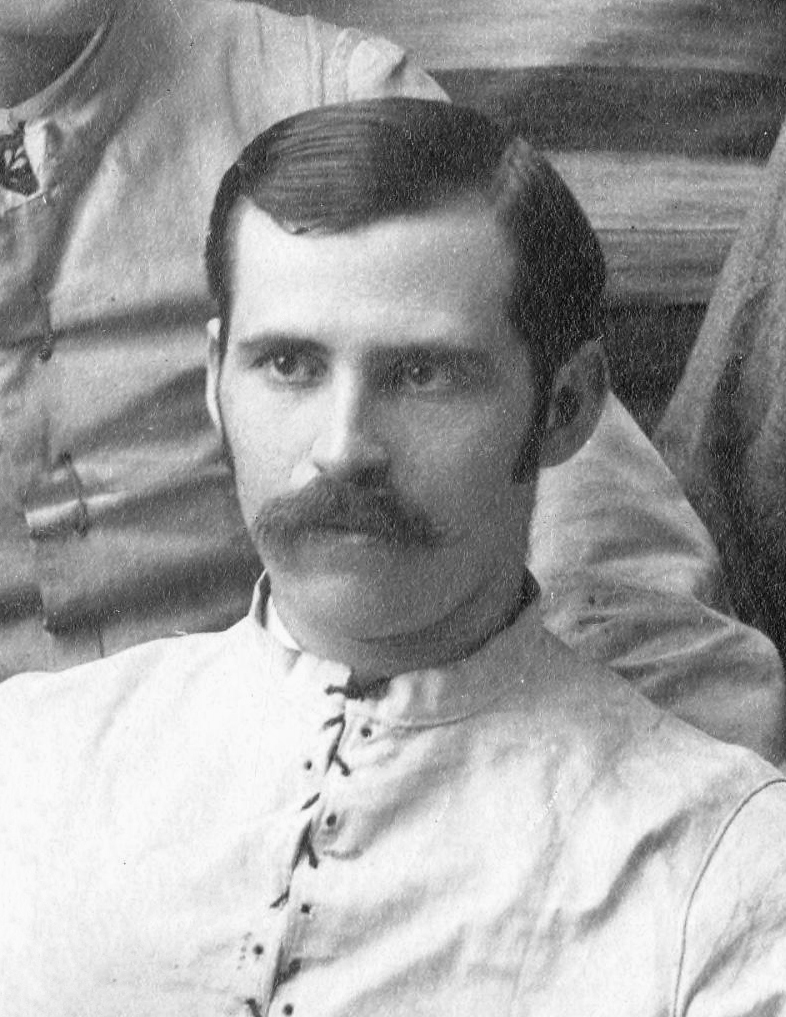
Horace Prettyman from Bryan, Ohio was captain of Michigan's football team for three straight years, during which the Wolverines were unbeaten and outscored their opponents, 192–10.

The team's captain was Horace Greely Prettyman, from Bryan, Ohio. Prettyman played eight years for the Michigan football team and was captain of the Michigan team three straight years from 1884 to 1886. No other player in the history of Michigan football has been selected as captain three times. In Prettyman's three years as captain, Michigan never lost a game, winning seven games and outscoring opponents 192 to 10.

== Game summaries ==
=== Game one: Michigan 50, Albion 0 ===
The first game was played on October 16, 1886, at Albion, with Michigan winning by a score of 50–0. The Michigan Argonaut described the game as "a walk-over for our team." The score was already 37 to 0 when time was called for the half, and the Argonaut singled out Wright, Prettyman and Frank Higgins for their fine play. The writer noted that the Albion team was "not in fine trim" and failed to get the ball near the Michigan goal. Perhaps trying to find something favorable to say about the opponent, the Argonaut reporter observed that "the Albion team did their best work in tackling."

=== Game two: Michigan 24, Albion 0 ===
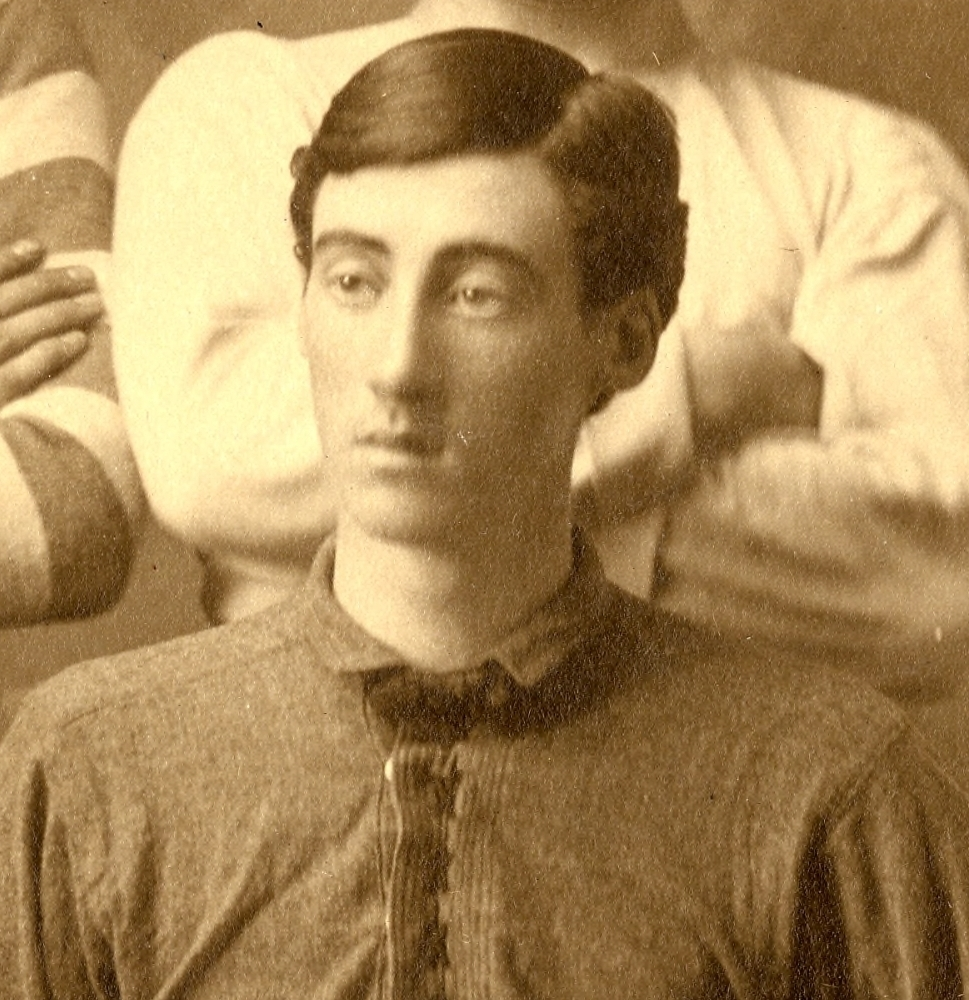
Team manager and goalkeeper John Duffy.

The second game was played at the Ann Arbor Fairgrounds on October 30, 1886, as part of a "field day" that included various athletic events. Michigan won the football game against Albion 24 to 0. The Michigan Argonaut noted, "The most striking difference between the elevens was that of weight, U. of M. presenting a much heavier team. It was evident, however, that Albion had come to play ball, and what they lacked in avoirdupois was in great measure made up by neat and rapid playing." The teams agreed to play "two innings of thirty minutes each," and the "rugby game" started at 3:35 with referee George W. Whyte calling, "Play." Michigan lost the toss, and Jaycox kicked off for Michigan, sending the ball near Albion's goal line. Michigan scored its first touchdown seven minutes into the game to take the lead 6 to 0. Jaycox and Jim Duffy made several fine runs, and "Prettyman's play was characterized by his usual heavy rushing." Michigan scored a second touchdown "just before the inning was called," and led 12 to 0 at the intermission. The second inning began at 4:40 p.m., and the Argonaut reported that "Albion played a much better game in this inning that did Michigan, and several times it looked as though they would score." Jaycox and Jim Duffy made several bad fumbles in the second inning, and Morrow, "who had been serving in first-class style one-fourth back, made several poor throws to the half backs and lost ground for Michigan." Jim Duffy made two brilliant runs in the inning, and Jaycox ran for a touchdown shortly before the game ended. Albion objected that the field was "overrun with spectators," and also claimed that Jaycox had run out of bounds on his touchdown run, but the claim was overruled. The Argonaut concluded its report on the game by noting, "The Albion boys were gentlemen, and played a square game."

== Players ==
=== Varsity letter winners ===
- Charles N. Banks, New Buffalo, Michigan - forward
- Frank F. Bumps, Shelby, Michigan - forward
- James E. Duffy, Ann Arbor, Michigan - halfback
- John L. Duffy - Ann Arbor, Michigan - goalkeeper and manager
- William W. Harless, Chicago, Illinois - substitute
- Frank G. Higgins from Butte, Montana - forward
- George C. Higgins - forward
- John Jaycox, Philadelphia, Pennsylvania - halfback
- Alexander C. Kiskadden, Tiffin, Ohio - forward
- William M. Morrow, Union City, Pennsylvania - quarterback
- Horace Greely Prettyman, Bryan, Ohio - forward
- Charles D. Wright from Minneapolis, Minnesota

=== Others ===
- William C. Malley, Chicago, Illinois - substitute
- Clifford C. Smith, Cleveland, Ohio - substitute
- Ernest Sprague, Farmington, Michigan - rusher
- William R. Trowbridge, Ann Arbor, Michigan - substitute
