= 1886 Northwestern Purple football team =

American college football season

1886 Northwestern Purple football
- Conference: Independent
- Record: 0–1
- Head coach: None
- Captain: M. E. Fawcett

1886 Midwestern college football independents records
	Conf.			Overall
Team	W	L	T	W		L		T
Cincinnati		–		2	–	0	–	0
Michigan		–		2	–	0	–	0
Wabash		–		2	–	0	–	1
Albion		–		1	–	2	–	0
Northwestern		–		0	–	1	–	0
Minnesota		–		0	–	2	–	0

The 1886 Northwestern Purple football team was an American football team that represented Northwestern University during the 1886 college football season. The Northwestern team played only one game, a 32–4 loss at Evanston to a team representing the Harvard School Athletic Club. The loss to the Harvard School was only the fourth game played by a Northwestern football team, one game having been played in 1876 and two games having been played six years later in 1882.

== Schedule ==
Date	Opponent	Site	Result	Source
October 30	Harvard School Athletic club	Evanston, IL	L 4–32	
