= 1885 Lafayette football team =

American college football season

1885 Lafayette football
- Conference: Independent
- Record: 3–2–1
- Head coach: None
- Captain: John Hamme

1885 college football records
| | Conf. | | | Overall |
| Team | W | L | T | W | | L | | T |
|---|---|---|---|---|---|---|---|---|
| Princeton | | – | | 9 | – | 0 | – | 0 |
| Michigan | | – | | 3 | – | 0 | – | 0 |
| Colorado College | | – | | 1 | – | 0 | – | 0 |
| Yale | | – | | 7 | – | 1 | – | 0 |
| Cincinnati | | – | | 1 | – | 0 | – | 1 |
| Penn | | – | | 8 | – | 5 | – | 0 |
| Lafayette | | – | | 3 | – | 2 | – | 1 |
| Massachusetts | | – | | 3 | – | 2 | – | 1 |
| Johns Hopkins | | – | | 2 | – | 2 | – | 0 |
| Richmond | | – | | 1 | – | 1 | – | 0 |
| Wesleyan | | – | | 3 | – | 4 | – | 0 |
| Navy | | – | | 1 | – | 2 | – | 0 |
| Lehigh | | – | | 1 | – | 5 | – | 1 |
| Rutgers | | – | | 0 | – | 1 | – | 0 |
| Fordham | | – | | 0 | – | 3 | – | 0 |

The 1885 Lafayette football team was an American football team that represented Lafayette College as an independent during the 1885 college football season. Playing without a regular coach, the team compiled a 3–2–1 record. John Hamme was the team captain, and E. Swift was the manager. The team played its home games on The Quad in Easton, Pennsylvania.

== Schedule ==
| Date | Time | Opponent | Site | Result | Source |
|---|---|---|---|---|---|
| October 24 | | Stevens | The Quad; Easton, PA | W 16–12 | |
| October 28 | 3:05 p.m. | Penn | The Quad; Easton, PA | L 22–30 | |
| October 31 | | at Lehigh | University Athletic Grounds; Bethlehem, PA (rivalry) | W 6–0 (forfeit) | |
| November 4 | 3:16 p.m. | at Penn | University Athletic Grounds; Philadelphia, PA | L 10–54 | |
| November 11 | | at Stevens | Hoboken, NJ | W 23–18 | |
| November 21 | | Lehigh | The Quad; Easton, PA | T 6–6 | |
