= Ernest Sprague =

- Born: October 20, 1865; Farmington, Michigan
- Died: May 10, 1938 (aged 72); Cleveland, Ohio
- Citizenship: United States
- Education: University of Michigan
- Known for: Football player/Engineer

Ernest Marshall Sprague (October 20, 1865 – May 10, 1938) was an American football player, public official, and engineer. He was born in 1865 on a farm at Farmington, Michigan. He was the son of Lorenzo Sprague and Laura G. (Meade) Sprague. He enrolled at the University of Michigan where he played college football as a rusher for the 1886 Michigan Wolverines football team and as a left guard for the 1887 team. After graduating from Michigan in 1888, Sprague was an engineer with the Chicago & Northwestern Railway. He remained in that position until 1895. He next worked for the Milwaukee, Lake Shore & Western Railroad as a general inspector from approximately 1895 to 1897. His next position was with the Detroit Bridge & Iron Works. He moved to Denver, Colorado, as a representative of the Gillett Herzog Manufacturing Company in 1898. In 1900, he became employed with the American Bridge Company in Denver from 1900 to 1903. In 1903, he moved to Cleveland, Ohio where he continued to work for the American Bridge Company as a contracting engineer. As of 1915, he was the construction manager of the American Bridge Co. in Cleveland, Ohio. He moved to East Cleveland, Ohio in 1905 and was a member of that city's city council and a city commissioner for several years. He served on East Cleveland's City Commission from 1918 to 1934. He married Maude L. Sill in Colorado in 1902. They had two children, Robert and Jean. At the time of the 1920 and 1930 U.S. Censuses, he lived in East Cleveland, Ohio, with his wife Maude. Sprague later worked for 18 years as a construction manager for Bethlehem Steel. He died in Cleveland at age 73 in 1938.
