= C. M. DeCamp =

American football player

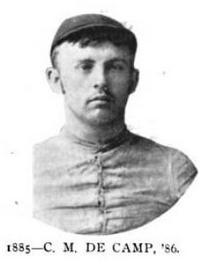

Profile
- Position: End

Career information
- College: Princeton (1884–1885)

Awards and highlights
- National championship (1885)

Charles M. DeCamp was an American college football player.

== Princeton ==
Decamp was a prominent end for the Princeton Tigers football team of Princeton University.

=== 1885 ===
He was captain of the 1885 team retroactively named national champion. One source lists DeCamp as the player of the year.
