= Stefan T. Vail Cooperative House =

Coordinates: 42°17′01.91″N 83°44′30.90″W

The Stefan T. Vail Cooperative House (or Vail House) is a housing cooperative for college students at the University of Michigan, Washtenaw Community College, and Eastern Michigan University located at 602 Lawrence Street in Ann Arbor, Michigan. A member of the Inter-Cooperative Council (ICC) in Ann Arbor, Vail house is named after Stefan Valavanis, a former ICC President who became a notable economist. It is one of only two known adobe buildings in Ann Arbor.

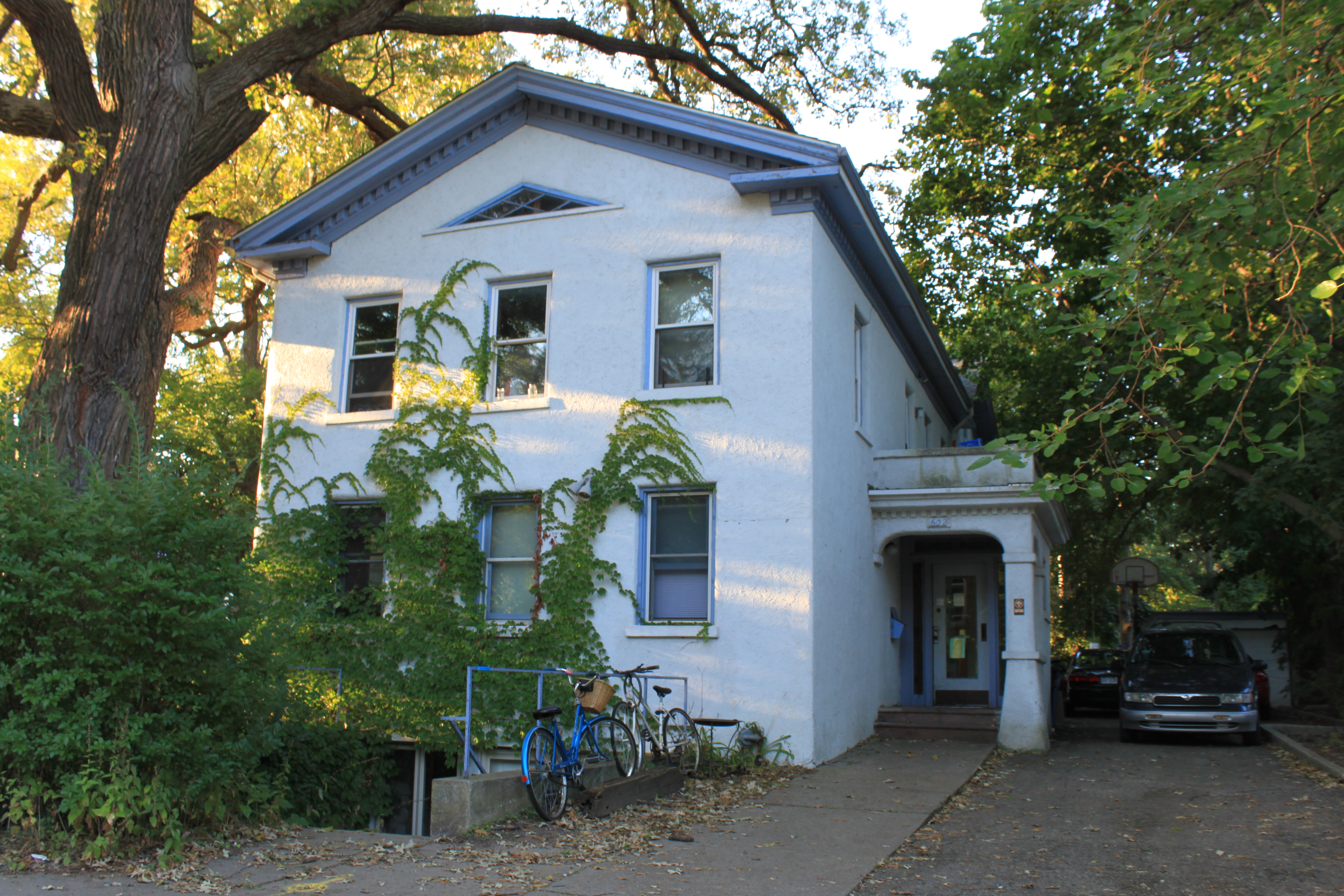
Stefan T. Vail House

== History ==
The building proper was constructed in 1848 by the family of Thomas and Margaret Mitchell, completed in the American Greek Revival style which typifies many Ann Arbor-area homes of the period. It has been recognized by the Ann Arbor Historical Commission; one of the pillars on the front porch bears a plaque which identifies it as the Hubbell Gregory House. Gregory married the Mitchell's daughter, and his descendants lived there until 1914 when his daughter Jennie Gregory died. Afterwards it became the residence of the family of Horace Greely Prettyman, who owned the Ann Arbor Press and White Swan Laundry. They added the porte cochere at this time. The Prettyman family lived here until around 1945, after which Abbie Schaefer took it over and ran it as a rooming house called Abby House.

In 1960 it was purchased by the Inter-Cooperative Council and opened as women's cooperative housing in the fall of 1961. In 1991, it became the only all-female co-op in the ICC system, though today it is open to any gender.

In addition to being one of the oldest houses in Ann Arbor, Vail House also boasts a magnificent bur oak tree in its front yard which has been estimated to be over two hundred years old.

== Stefan T. Valavanis ==
Vail House was named for Stefan T. Vail (or Stephanos Valavanis), who was an ICC member and president in the mid-1950s. While at the University of Michigan, Stefan Vail helped to devise the financial structure of the ICC. After having earned his doctorate in economics, Stefan Vail was an assistant professor of economics at Harvard University from 1956 to 1958. While camping near Mount Olympus in Greece, Stefan Vail was shot and killed by an army deserter who mistook him for a pursuing officer. His death was called a "tragedy" by his senior colleague at the Harvard Economics Department, Seymour Harris, who wrote that Valavanis was "brilliant, imaginative, and a first–class scholar and teacher"; according to Seymour, Valavanis's econometrics textbook had "pedagogical strength", proceeding "more by statements of problems and examples than by the development of mathematical proofs". Soon after, the ICC Board of Directors voted to name the next house they purchased after Vail, in recognizing his contributions to the ICC and to economics. In 1979, European members of the Econometric Society contributed papers to a volume commemorating Valavanis.
