= 1885 Rutgers Queensmen football team =

American college football season

1885 Rutgers Queensmen football
- Conference: Independent
- Record: 0–1
- Head coach: None
- Captain: Asa Wynkoop
- Home stadium: College Field

1885 college football records
	Conf.			Overall
Team	W	L	T	W		L		T
Princeton		–		9	–	0	–	0
Michigan		–		3	–	0	–	0
Colorado College		–		1	–	0	–	0
Yale		–		7	–	1	–	0
Cincinnati		–		1	–	0	–	1
Penn		–		8	–	5	–	0
Lafayette		–		3	–	2	–	1
Massachusetts		–		3	–	2	–	1
Johns Hopkins		–		2	–	2	–	0
Richmond		–		1	–	1	–	0
Wesleyan		–		3	–	4	–	0
Navy		–		1	–	2	–	0
Lehigh		–		1	–	5	–	1
Rutgers		–		0	–	1	–	0
Fordham		–		0	–	3	–	0

The 1885 Rutgers Queensmen football team represented Rutgers University in the 1885 college football season. The Queensmen played only one intercollegiate game, a 10-5 loss to Lehigh on November 14, 1885, in Bethlehem, Pennsylvania. The team had no coach, and its captain was Lewis Chamberlain.

== Schedule ==
Date	Opponent	Site	Result	Source
November 14	at Lehigh	Bethlehem, PA	L 5–10	
