= 1885 Princeton Tigers football team =

American college football season

1885 Princeton Tigers football

National champion
- Conference: Independent
- Record: 9–0
- Head coach: None
- Captain: C. M. DeCamp

1885 college football records
	Conf.			Overall
Team	W	L	T	W		L		T
Princeton		–		9	–	0	–	0
Michigan		–		3	–	0	–	0
Colorado College		–		1	–	0	–	0
Yale		–		7	–	1	–	0
Cincinnati		–		1	–	0	–	1
Penn		–		8	–	5	–	0
Lafayette		–		3	–	2	–	1
Massachusetts		–		3	–	2	–	1
Johns Hopkins		–		2	–	2	–	0
Richmond		–		1	–	1	–	0
Wesleyan		–		3	–	4	–	0
Navy		–		1	–	2	–	0
Lehigh		–		1	–	5	–	1
Rutgers		–		0	–	1	–	0
Fordham		–		0	–	3	–	0

The 1885 Princeton Tigers football team represented the College of New Jersey, then more commonly known as Princeton College, in the 1885 college football season. The team finished with a 9–0 record and was retroactively named as national champions by the Billingsley Report, Helms Athletic Foundation, Houlgate System, National Championship Foundation, and Parke H. Davis. This season marked Princeton's 13th football national championship.

The season was notable for one of the most celebrated football plays of the 19th century—a 90-yard punt return by Henry "Tillie" Lamar in the closing minutes of the game to beat Yale, 6–5, a team Princeton had not defeated since 1878.

== Schedule ==
Date	Time	Opponent	Site	Result	Attendance	Source
October 3		at Stevens	Hoboken, NJ	W 94–0		
October 14		Stevens	Princeton, NJ	W 76–0		
October 24	3:24 p.m. or 3:28 p.m.	at Penn	University Athletic Grounds; Philadelphia, PA (rivalry)	W 72–10	900–1,000	
October 31		Penn	Princeton, NJ	W 80–10		
November 7		at Columbia Law School	New York, NY	W 64–0		
November 11		Johns Hopkins	Princeton, NJ	W 10–0		
November 14		Wesleyan	Princeton, NJ	W 76–0		
November 21	2:30 p.m.	at Yale	Yale Field; New Haven, CT (rivalry)	W 6–5	5,000	
November 26	2:45 p.m.	at Penn	University Athletic Grounds; Philadelphia, PA	W 57–0	2,500	
