= 1886 Minnesota Golden Gophers football team =

American college football season

1886 Minnesota Golden Gophers football
- Conference: Independent
- Record: 0–2
- Head coach: Frederick S. Jones (1st season)
- Captain: Howard Abbott

1886 Midwestern college football independents records
| | Conf. | | | Overall |
| Team | W | L | T | W | | L | | T |
|---|---|---|---|---|---|---|---|---|
| Cincinnati | | – | | 2 | – | 0 | – | 0 |
| Michigan | | – | | 2 | – | 0 | – | 0 |
| Wabash | | – | | 2 | – | 0 | – | 1 |
| Albion | | – | | 1 | – | 2 | – | 0 |
| Northwestern | | – | | 0 | – | 1 | – | 0 |
| Minnesota | | – | | 0 | – | 2 | – | 0 |

The 1886 Minnesota Golden Gophers football team represented the University of Minnesota as an independent during the 1886 college football season. The season was the first season under head coach Frederick S. Jones. He came from Yale to teach physics and became known as the "father of Minnesota football". Unlike Thomas Peebles, he preferred the rugby style of football. They each put together competing teams, but practical considerations helped to decide the future of football at Minnesota. Alfred F. Pillsbury arrived on campus and he owned a brand-new rugby ball, which was rare in those days. From that point on, football at Minnesota was played in the rugby style.

== Before the season ==
After not fielding a team in 1884 and 1885, the 1886 season saw the debut of Alf Pillsbury, a crucial figure in the early days of Minnesota football. Due to a lack of rules regarding eligibility in college football, he played on the team for eight years and was captain for two of them. On the way to the game in Faribault, the team designed its first set of signals. It didn't seem to help much in the game itself, which they lost 9-5. The rematch with Shattuck back in Minneapolis marked the first time that admission was charged at a Minnesota game.

Team of 1886: Rushers, William Wagner (center), Alf F. Pillsbury, F.W. Nickerson, Christopher Graham, J. Paul Goode, Birney E. Trask, Charles H. Alden; Quarterback, Howard T. Abbott (captain); Halfbacks, John F. Hayden, Herschel J. Mayall and E.R. Allen; Back, Frank D. Jones; Substitutes, Henry Cotton and A.D. Meeds; Coach, Frederick S. Jones.

== Schedule ==
| Date | Opponent | Site | Result |
|---|---|---|---|
| October 25 | at Shattuck | Faribault, MN | L 5–9 |
| November 6 | Shattuck | Minneapolis, MN | L 8–18 |
