= Woody Wagenhorst =

American athlete and coach (1863–1946)

Biographical details
- Born: June 3, 1863; Gouldsboro, Pennsylvania, U.S.
- Died: February 12, 1946 (aged 82); Washington, D.C., U.S.

Playing career

Football
- 1886–1887: Princeton
- 1888: Penn

Baseball
- 1888: Philadelphia Quakers
- 1889: Minneapolis Millers
- 1889: St. Paul Apostles
- 1890–1891: Penn
- Positions: End (football); Third baseman (baseball)

Coaching career (HC unless noted)

Football
- 1888–1891: Penn

Head coaching record
- Overall: 39–18

Woody Wagenhorst
- Born: June 3, 1863; Gouldsboro, Pennsylvania
- Died: February 12, 1946 (aged 82); Washington, D.C.
- Batted: Left Threw: Unknown

MLB debut
- June 25, 1888, for the Philadelphia Quakers

Last MLB appearance
- June 25, 1888, for the Philadelphia Quakers

MLB statistics
- Games: 2
- At bats: 8
- Hits: 1
- Stats at Baseball Reference

Teams
- Philadelphia Quakers (1888)

Elwood Otto "Woody" Wagenhorst (June 3, 1863 – February 12, 1946) was an American football and baseball player and coach. He played Major League Baseball as a third baseman for the Philadelphia Quakers in 1888. In two career games, he had one hit in eight at-bats. Wagenhorst served as the head football coach at the University of Pennsylvania from 1888 to 1891, compiling a record of 39–18.

== Biography ==
Wagenhorst was born in Gouldsboro, Pennsylvania in 1863. He played baseball and football while attending Princeton University (then known as the College of New Jersey). At the time of his graduation from Princeton, on June 8, 1888, he debuted at third base for the Philadelphia Quakers in the National League. After playing in only two games, Wagenhorst soon accepted an invitation to become coach of Penn's second paid football team, succeeding Frank Dole. For his coaching duties, Wagenhorst was paid $275.

In the fall of 1888 as Wagenhorst served the Penn football team as its coach, trainer and he even played end briefly that season. In 1889, while coaching at Penn, Wagenhorst enrolled in Law School. As a Penn law student, Wagenhorst also became third-baseman and captain of the school's 1890 and 1891 baseball teams.

After graduating in 1892, he became a private secretary for a Republican member of the U.S. House of Representatives from Pennsylvania and later Mayor of Philadelphia, John E. Reyburn. Wagenhorst later practiced law in Washington D. C. until his death in 1946.

He was a brother of football player and coach Otto Wagenhorst.

== Head coaching record ==
| Year | Team | Overall | Conference | Standing | Bowl/playoffs |
|---|---|---|---|---|---|
Penn Quakers (Independent) (1888–1891)
| 1888 | Penn | 10–7 | | | |
| 1889 | Penn | 7–6 | | | |
| 1890 | Penn | 11–3 | | | |
| 1891 | Penn | 11–2 | | | |
| Penn: | | 39–18 | | | |
| Total: | | 39–18 | | | |
