= Frank F. Bumps =

American attorney (1861–1914)

- Born: June 21, 1861; Bangor, Maine, U.S.
- Died: July 8, 1914 (aged 53); Detroit, Michigan, U.S.
- Citizenship: United States
- Education: University of Michigan
- Occupation: Attorney
- Years active: 1892-1914
- Political party: Republican
- Spouse: Edith L. Knapp

Frank Forest Bumps (June 21, 1861 – July 18, 1914) was an American attorney. He was one of the most prominent attorneys in Detroit from 1898 until his death in 1914. He also played American football as a forward on the undefeated 1885 and 1886 Michigan Wolverines football teams.

== Early years ==
Bumps was born in 1861 in Bangor, Maine. As a boy of approximately 12 years, he moved with his family to Muskegon, Michigan. He enrolled at the University of Michigan in 1881 and, after missing two years due to illness, graduated from the Literary Department in 1887 with a Ph.B. degree. While attending the university, he played at the forward position on the undefeated 1885 and 1886 Michigan Wolverines football teams. While at Michigan, he was also a champion wrestler, a sprinter on the track team, and a member of the baseball team.

After receiving his degree, he taught school in Bancroft and Corunna, Michigan.

== Legal career ==
Bumps later studied law in the office of Judge S.S. Miner. He was admitted to practice as an attorney in 1892 and served as a circuit court commissioner in Shiawassee County and city attorney for Owosso, Michigan. In 1898, he moved to Detroit. He served as the First Assistant Prosecuting Attorney in Wayne County for five years commencing in 1901. He later practiced in partnership with Matthew H. Bishop, became one of Detroit's most prominent criminal attorneys, and tried some of the city's most famous cases. Bumps' prominent cases included:

- In 1904, after a five-week trial, he won the conviction of Emil Waltz for the murder of a young boy, Alphonse Welmes.
- In 1905, he prosecuted Rose Barron, an elderly woman accused of serving biscuits poisoned with arsenic to multiple occupants at the Alhambra Apartments, resulting in the death of a baby. The Barron trial received detailed daily coverage for more than two weeks in the Detroit press. It ended with a hung jury.
- He conducted the grand jury investigation into the Department of Public Works.
- In 1909, he defended Dr. Garabed K. Boyajian in two trials on charges of murdering his nephew. Boyajian admitted the killing but claimed he had been rendered temporarily insane on hearing from his wife that the deceased was a fiend who had victimized her. The first trial resulted in a hung jury, and the second in an acquittal after seven weeks. The Detroit Free Press described the trial as "thrilling and dramatic" and credited Bumps for the outcome: "The defendant's case seemed hopeless as far as acquittal was concerned, yet Mr. Bumps by his clever questioning of witnesses and by a stirring closing address acquitted his client."

In 1912, he ran unsuccessfully for Wayne County Prosecuting Attorney. Bumps was a member of the Detroit Board of Commerce and a sergeant in the Michigan National Guard.

== Family and death ==
In 1893, Bumps married Edith L. Knapp. They had three daughters, Dorothy, Francis, and Marjorie. They were divorced in 1904. He died in 1914 at age 53 at Harper Hospital in Detroit. The cause of death was peritonitis.
