= 1886 Cincinnati football team =

American college football season

1886 Cincinnati football
- Conference: Independent
- Record: 2–0
- Head coach: None
- Captain: Arch Carson

1886 Midwestern college football independents records
	Conf.			Overall
Team	W	L	T	W		L		T
Cincinnati		–		2	–	0	–	0
Michigan		–		2	–	0	–	0
Wabash		–		2	–	0	–	1
Albion		–		1	–	2	–	0
Northwestern		–		0	–	1	–	0
Minnesota		–		0	–	2	–	0

The 1886 Cincinnati football team was an American football team that represented the University of Cincinnati as an independent during the 1886 college football season. The team compiled a 2–0 record. Arch Carson was the team captain. The team had no head coach.

== Schedule ==
Opponent	Site	Result
Mount Auburn Athletic Club	Cincinnati, OH	W 18–6
Mount Auburn Athletic Club	Cincinnati, OH	W 8–6
