= 1885 Cincinnati football team =

American college football season

1885 Cincinnati football
- Conference: Independent
- Record: 1–0–1
- Head coach: None
- Captain: Arch Carson

1885 college football records
	Conf.			Overall
Team	W	L	T	W		L		T
Princeton		–		9	–	0	–	0
Michigan		–		3	–	0	–	0
Colorado College		–		1	–	0	–	0
Yale		–		7	–	1	–	0
Cincinnati		–		1	–	0	–	1
Penn		–		8	–	5	–	0
Lafayette		–		3	–	2	–	1
Massachusetts		–		3	–	2	–	1
Johns Hopkins		–		2	–	2	–	0
Richmond		–		1	–	1	–	0
Wesleyan		–		3	–	4	–	0
Navy		–		1	–	2	–	0
Lehigh		–		1	–	5	–	1
Rutgers		–		0	–	1	–	0
Fordham		–		0	–	3	–	0

The 1885 Cincinnati football team was an American football team that represented the University of Cincinnati as an independent during the 1885 college football season. The team compiled a 1–0–1 record. Arch Carson was the team captain. The team had no head coach. In its inaugural season of college football, Cincinnati played two games against the Mount Auburn Athletic Club team with the games three weeks apart.

Cincinnati did not play its first intercollegiate football game until three years later in December 1888.

== Schedule ==
Date	Opponent	Site	Result
October 23	Mount Auburn Athletic Club	Cincinnati, OH	T 0–0
November 14	Mount Auburn Athletic Club	Cincinnati, OH	W 26–6
