= William M. Morrow =

United States Army general

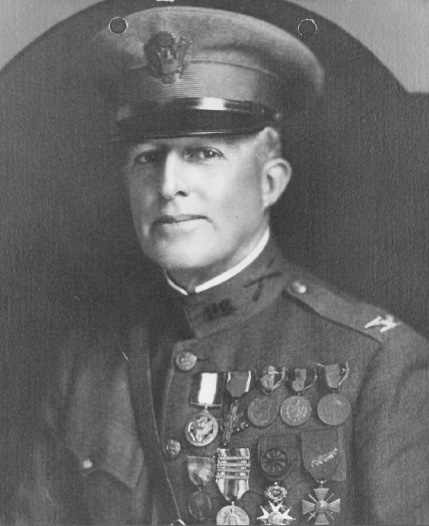
- Morrow as commander of the 15th Infantry regiment, circa 1920
- Born: September 6, 1866; Niles, Michigan, U.S.
- Died: July 21, 1944 (aged 77); Quebec City, Canada
- Burial place: Arlington National Cemetery
- Alma mater: University of Michigan
- Spouse: Elizabeth S. "Bessie" Morrow (m. 1915-1944, his death)
- Military career
- Allegiance: United States
- Branch: United States Army
- Service years: 1888-1930
- Rank: Brigadier General
- Unit: Infantry Branch
- Commands: 15th Infantry Regiment; 5th Division; United States Disciplinary Barracks, Fort Leavenworth; Discharge and Replacement Depot, Brooklyn Army Base
- Conflicts: Spanish–American War; Philippine–American War; World War I
- Awards: Distinguished Service Cross; Army Distinguished Service Medal; Legion of Honor (Chevalier) (France)

William M. Morrow (September 6, 1866 – July 21, 1944) was an American football player and soldier. He played college football at the University of Michigan in 1885 and 1886 and was the starting quarterback for the 1886 Michigan Wolverines football team. He enlisted in the United States Army in 1888 and served for more than 40 years until his retirement in 1930. He was decorated for his service in World War I and achieved the rank of brigadier general.

== Early years ==
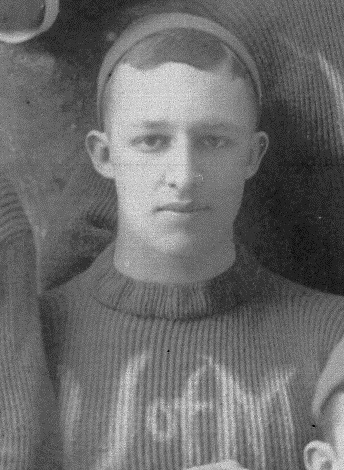
Closeup of Morrow in 1885, taken from University of Michigan football team's group photo

Morrow was born in 1866 in Niles, Michigan. He attended the University of Michigan. He was a forward on the 1885 Michigan Wolverines football team, and the quarterback of the undefeated 1886 team.

== Military career ==
Morrow enlisted in the United States Army in 1888. He served as a private, corporal and sergeant in Company F, 17th Infantry, from December 1888 to August 1891. He became a second lieutenant in the 21st Infantry in 1891 and graduated from the Infantry and Cavalry School in 1897. He was promoted to first lieutenant in April 1898. He was promoted to the rank of captain in 1901. In 1906, Morrow gained acclaim for leading the 21st Infantry in attacks against rebel forces on the island of Samar in the Philippines. In October 1912, he was assigned to the Fifth Infantry Regiment and was promoted to the rank of major in March 1913.

During World War I, he served with the 7th Infantry, 3rd Division, in France. For his leadership at Claire Chêne Woods in October 1917, he received the Distinguished Service Cross. The citation recognized Morrow "for extraordinary heroism in action while serving as Commanding Officer, 7th Infantry Regiment, 3d Division, A.E.F., in the Claires-Chenes Woods, north of Montfaucon, France, October 20–21, 1918. On October 20, 1918, when the Claire Chenes had been taken by the troops of his command and a hostile counterattack had forced them back over the ground gained in the morning's fighting, Colonel Morrow at once took personal command of the battalion engaged in the operations, reorganized it, and with distinguished gallantry and inspiring example led his men to a victorious counterattack, drove the enemy from the woods, secured its possession, and consolidated it. On October 21 he again displayed the same qualities of leadership and personal gallantry in the successful assault on Hill No. 299." He was also awarded the Army Distinguished Service Medal "for exceptionally meritorious and distinguished services to the Government of the United States, in a duty of great responsibility during World War I. Colonel Morrow served with conspicuous success as Commanding Officer of the 7th Infantry, 3d Division, succeeding in all of the difficult missions assigned to him. His sound judgment and untiring energy proved important factors in the successful operations of his division against the enemy." He also received the French Légion d´honneur by Presidential Decree on May 14, 1919, and French Croix de Guerre with palm in April 1919.

After the war, Morrow was placed in command of the United States Disciplinary Barracks at Fort Leavenworth in Kansas. He was later placed in charge of the Discharge and Replacement Depot at the Brooklyn Army Base prior to his retirement in 1930. He retired with the rank of colonel, but he was promoted on the retired list by Act of Congress to the rank of brigadier general.

== Death ==
In July 1944, Morrow died in Quebec City, Canada. He was buried at Arlington National Cemetery. Morrow was survived by his wife, Bessie (1876–1971), whom he married in 1915 after her divorce from Evan M. Johnson.

== See also ==
- 1885 Michigan Wolverines football team
- 1886 Michigan Wolverines football team
