= Tillie Lamar =

American football player (1865–1891)

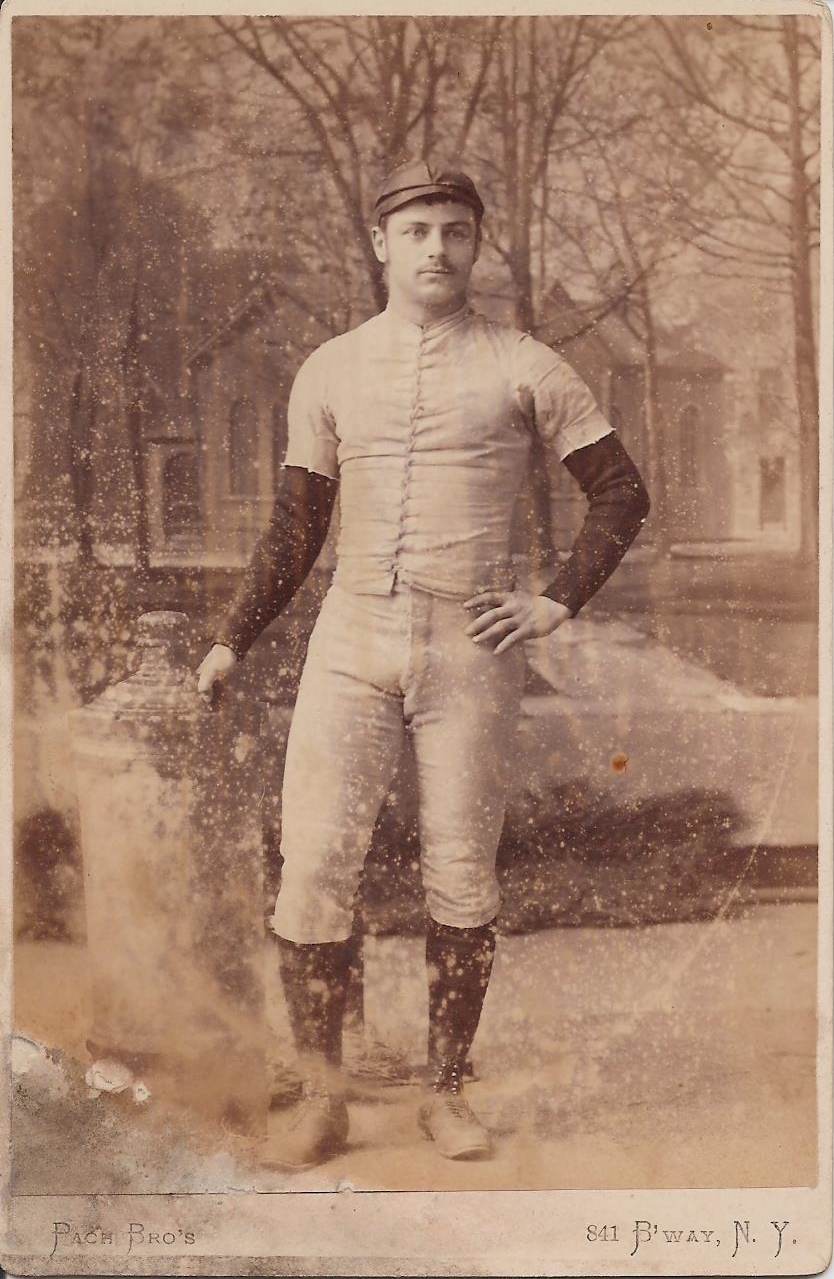
- Henry "Tillie" Lamar cabinet card.

Profile
- Position: Halfback

Personal information
- Born: October 4, 1865; Augusta, Georgia
- Died: March 10, 1891 (aged 25); Augusta, Georgia

Career information
- College: Princeton (1884–1885)

Awards and highlights
- National championship (1885)

Henry Cummings "Tillie" Lamar (October 4, 1865 – March 10, 1891) was a college football player.

== Early life ==
Lamar was born on October 4, 1865, in Augusta, Georgia, to Gazaway DeRosset Lamar and Maria Cumming.

== Princeton ==
=== 1885 ===
The season was notable for one of the most celebrated football plays of the 19th century - a 90-yard punt return by Lamar of Princeton in the closing minutes of the game against Yale. Trailing 5-0, Princeton dropped two men back to receive a Yale punt. The punt glanced off one returner's shoulder and was caught by the other, Lamar, on the dead run. Lamar streaked down the left sideline, until hemmed in by two Princeton players, then cut sharply to the middle of the field, ducking under their arms and breaking loose for the touchdown. After the controversy of a darkness-shortened Yale-Princeton championship game the year before that was ruled "no contest," a record crowd turned out for the 1885 game. For the first time, the game was played on one of the campuses instead of at a neutral site, and emerged as a major social event, attracting ladies to its audience as well as students and male spectators. The Lamar punt return furnished the most spectacular ending to any football game played to that point, and did much to popularize the sport of college football to the general public. The play is referred to as the "Lamar run" and it is considered one of the most notable plays of that century; The game is also often referred to as the "Lamar game". His run against Yale in 1885 gave Princeton its only victory over Yale in a decade (1879 - 1888).

== Death ==
Lamar, the grandson of Henry Cumming who conceived of and promoted the construction of the Augusta Canal, died by drowning at the opening of the canal connecting Lake Olmstead with the Savannah River, near Augusta, Georgia.
