= Frank Dole =

American football coach, dog breeder, and journalist

Biographical details
- Born: December 25, 1859; Portland, Maine, U.S.
- Died: May 22, 1939 (aged 79); Metuchen, New Jersey, U.S.

Coaching career (HC unless noted)
- 1885–1887: Penn

Head coaching record
- Overall: 23–20–1

Frank Fessenden Dole (December 25, 1859 – May 22, 1939) was an American college football coach, dog breeder, and journalist. He was the first head football coach at the University of Pennsylvania, serving from 1885 to 1887, and leading the Penn Quakers to a record of 23–20–1 in three seasons.

Dole was born on December 25, 1859, in Portland, Maine. As a dog breeder, he specialized in Bull Terriers. Dole joined the New York Herald Tribune in 1912 as a writer, and remained on the newspaper's staff until 1938, when he retired as kennel editor. He died on May 22, 1939, at his home in Metuchen, New Jersey.

== Head coaching record ==
Year	Team	Overall	Conference	Standing	Bowl/playoffs
Penn Quakers (Independent) (1885–1887)
1885	Penn	8–6			
1886	Penn	9–7–1			
1887	Penn	6–7			
Penn:		23–20–1			
Total:		23–20–1			
