= Thomas H. McNeil =

American football player and lawyer (1860–1932)

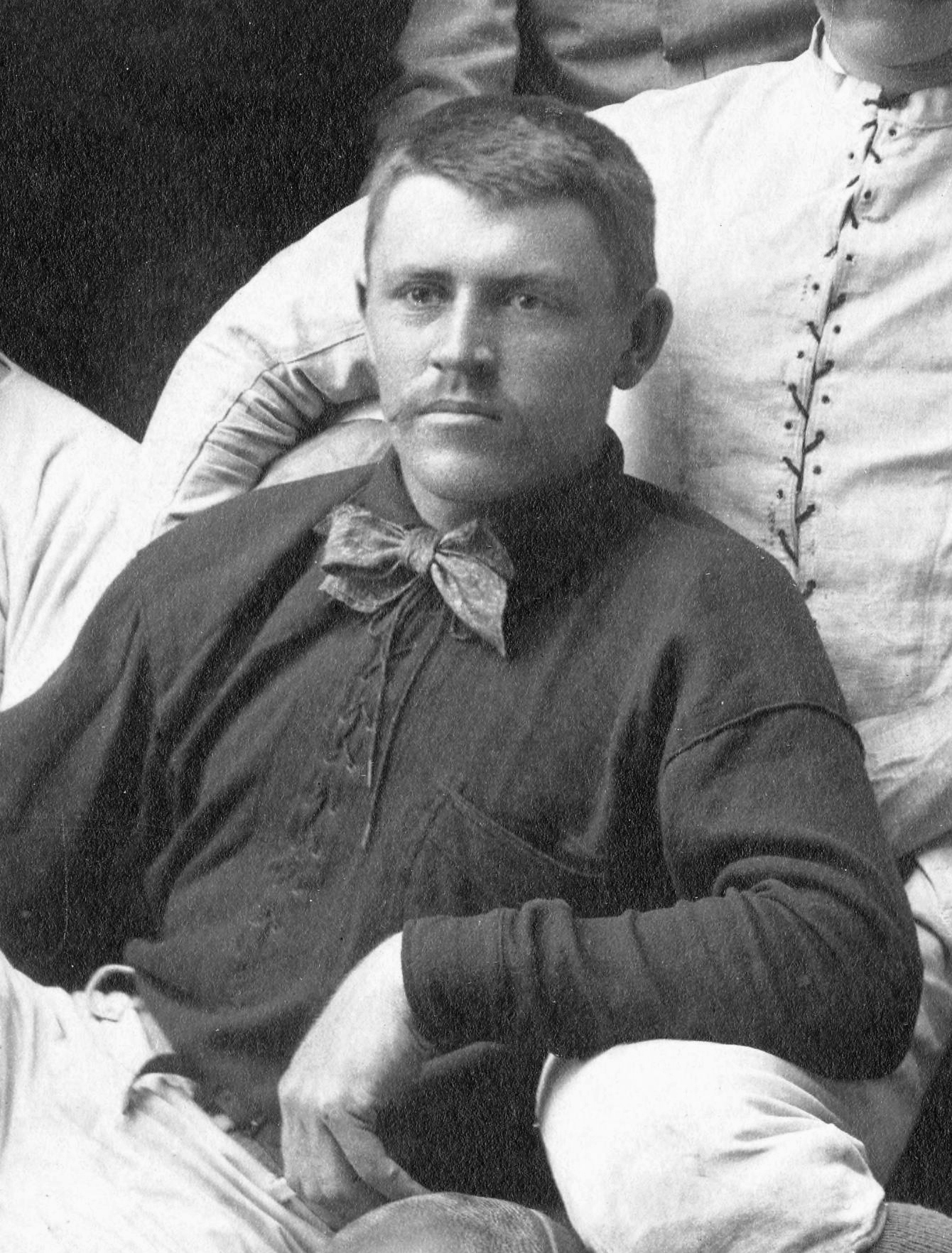
- Thomas H. McNeil, 1884
- Born: February 29, 1860; Burdette, Bates County, Missouri, United States
- Died: October 1, 1932 (aged 72)
- Education: University of Michigan
- Known for: Football player/Lawyer

Thomas H. McNeil (February 29, 1860 – October 1, 1932) was an American football player and lawyer. He was the first University of Michigan football player to be the starting quarterback in consecutive years. He led the Michigan football team to undefeated seasons in 1884 and 1885. He later became a lawyer practicing in Missouri.

== Early years ==
McNeil was born near Burdette, Bates County, Missouri, in 1860.

== University of Michigan ==
McNeil attended the University of Michigan where he graduated from the Literary Department in 1885 and the Law Department in 1886. While attending Michigan, he was the starting quarterback for the 1884 and 1885 Michigan Wolverines football teams. He was the first player to be Michigan's starting quarterback in consecutive years. During his two years at quarterback, Michigan was undefeated. The 1884 team compiled a 2–0 record and outscored its opponents by a combined score of 36 to 10. The center on the 1884, snapping the ball to McNeil, was Henry Killilea, one of the five men who founded baseball's American League. McNeil led the 1885 team to a 3–0 record, with the team outscoring its opponents by a combined score of 82 to 0. During the time when McNeil was Michigan's starting quarterback, the forward pass was not permitted and the ball (pictured at McNeil's side in photograph to the right) was round, bearing a stronger resemblance to a rugby ball than a modern American football.

== Legal career and Pythians ==
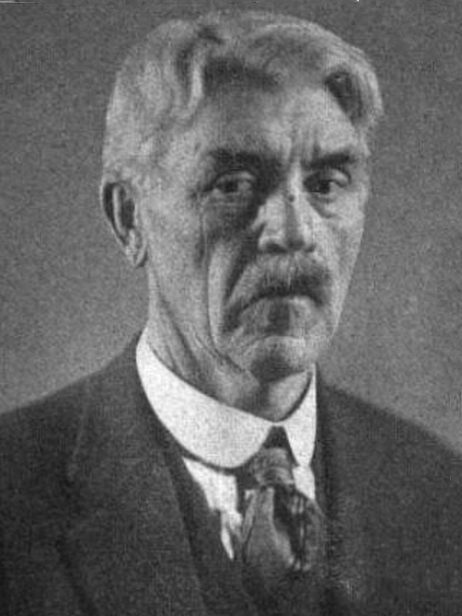
Tom H. McNeil, 1920

After graduating from Michigan, McNeil began practicing law at Kansas City, Missouri. In January 1901, McNeil became a lawyer in the Claims Department of the Kansas City Railways Company, a position he held for more than 21 years. In later years, he was responsible for making accident reports to the Interstate Commerce Commission and the Public Service Commission of Missouri. At the time of his 21st anniversary with the company, the Railwayan noted:

The life of Tom McNeil has been a success because he has possessed the three necessary qualifications – honest, industry and a vision for the future. His word is as sacred as his signed contract. He is always the first to arrive at his office in the morning and never fails to accomplish a full day's work. ... It is too bad that such men as Tom H. McNeil of such sterling worth and integrity cannot live forever.

In addition to his legal career, McNeil was a member and leader in the Knights of Pythias, a fraternal organization and secret society founded in 1864. He served as the 30th Grand Chancellor of the Knights of Pythias from 1899 to 1900.

== See also ==
- 1884 Michigan Wolverines football team
- 1885 Michigan Wolverines football team
