= 1885 Yale Bulldogs football team =

American college football season

1885 Yale Bulldogs football
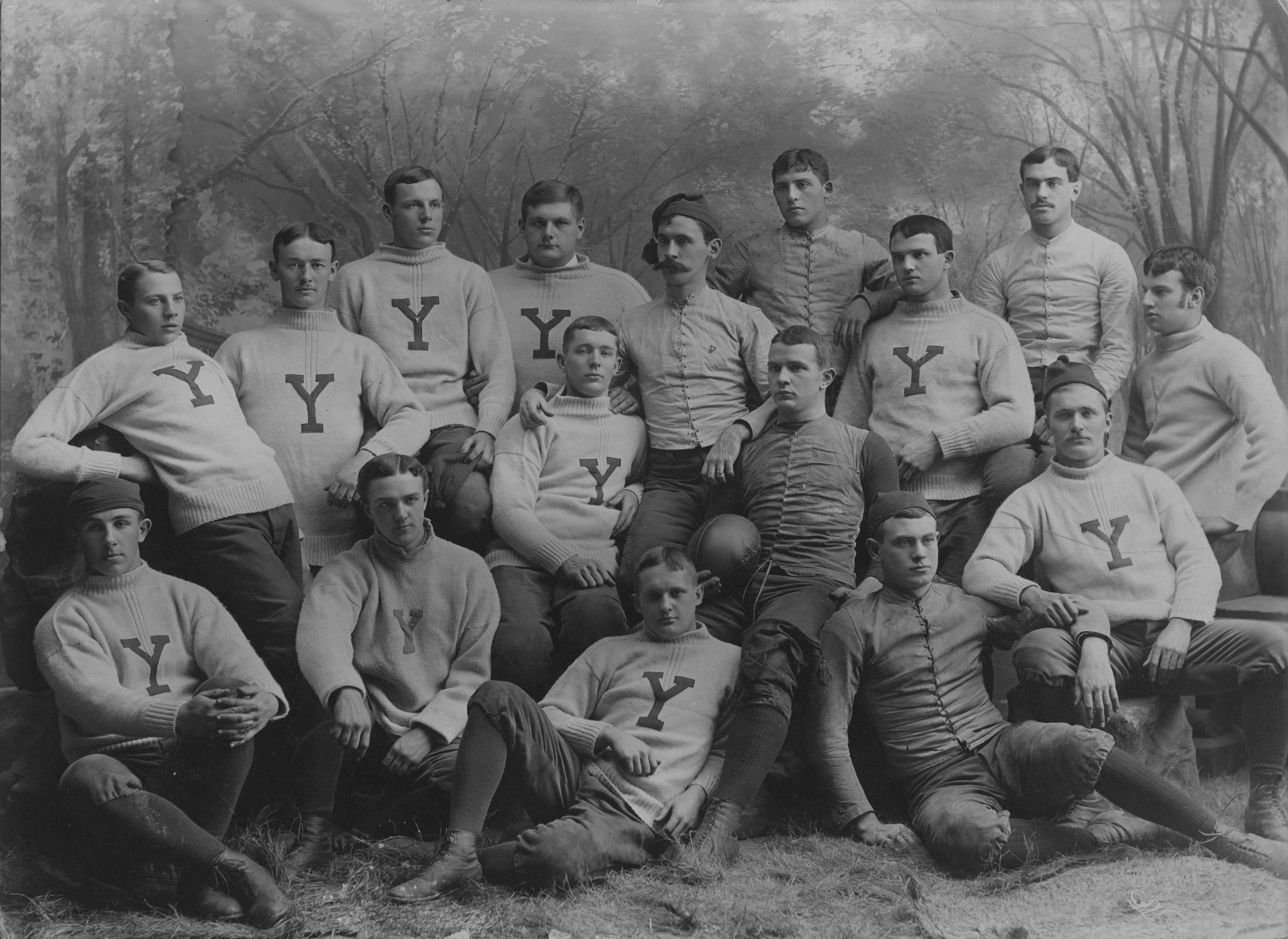
- Conference: Independent
- Record: 7–1
- Head coach: None
- Captain: Frank G. Peters
- Home stadium: Yale Field

1885 college football records
	Conf.			Overall
Team	W	L	T	W		L		T
Princeton		–		9	–	0	–	0
Michigan		–		3	–	0	–	0
Colorado College		–		1	–	0	–	0
Yale		–		7	–	1	–	0
Cincinnati		–		1	–	0	–	1
Penn		–		8	–	5	–	0
Lafayette		–		3	–	2	–	1
Massachusetts		–		3	–	2	–	1
Johns Hopkins		–		2	–	2	–	0
Richmond		–		1	–	1	–	0
Wesleyan		–		3	–	4	–	0
Navy		–		1	–	2	–	0
Lehigh		–		1	–	5	–	1
Rutgers		–		0	–	1	–	0
Fordham		–		0	–	3	–	0

The 1885 Yale Bulldogs football team represented Yale University in the 1885 college football season. The Bulldogs finished with a 7–1 record. The team achieved six shutouts and held a significant scoring advantage over their opponents, with a combined total of 366 points scored to just 11 against them. Their sole defeat came at the hands of their archrival Princeton, in a closely contested match with a final score of 6-5.

== Schedule ==
Date	Time	Opponent	Site	Result	Attendance	Source
October 10		at Stevens	St. George's Cricket Club grounds; Hoboken, NJ	W 55–0		
October 14		vs. Wesleyan	Ward Street Grounds; Hartford, CT	W 18–0	200	
October 28	3:00 p.m.	Wesleyan	Yale Field; New Haven, CT	W 68–0		
October 31		at MIT	Union Grounds; Boston, MA	W 51–0	900	
November 3		Crescent Athletic Club	Yale Field; New Haven, CT	W 52–0		
November 14	2:00 p.m.	at Penn	University Athletic Grounds; Philadelphia, PA	W 53–5		
November 21	2:30 p.m.	Princeton	Yale Field; New Haven, CT (rivalry)	L 5–6	5,000	
November 26		vs. Wesleyan	Polo Grounds; New York, NY	W 61–0	5,000	

== Roster ==
- Harry Beecher, QB
- Lewis S. Bigelow
- James J. Buchanan, G
- William T. Bull
- Edward L. Burke, FB
- George R. Carter
- Robert N. Corwin, E
- Alexander B. Coxe
- Billy Crawford, HB
- Charles O. Gill, T
- Harry L. Hamlin, T
- Albert C. Lux
- Frank G. Peters, C
- Reginald Ronalds
- Edward B. Seeley
- Amos Alonzo Stagg
- Frederick W. Wallace, E
- George A. Watkinson
- George Washington Woodruff, G
- George H. Young, FB
