= Horace Greely Prettyman =

American football player (1857–1945)

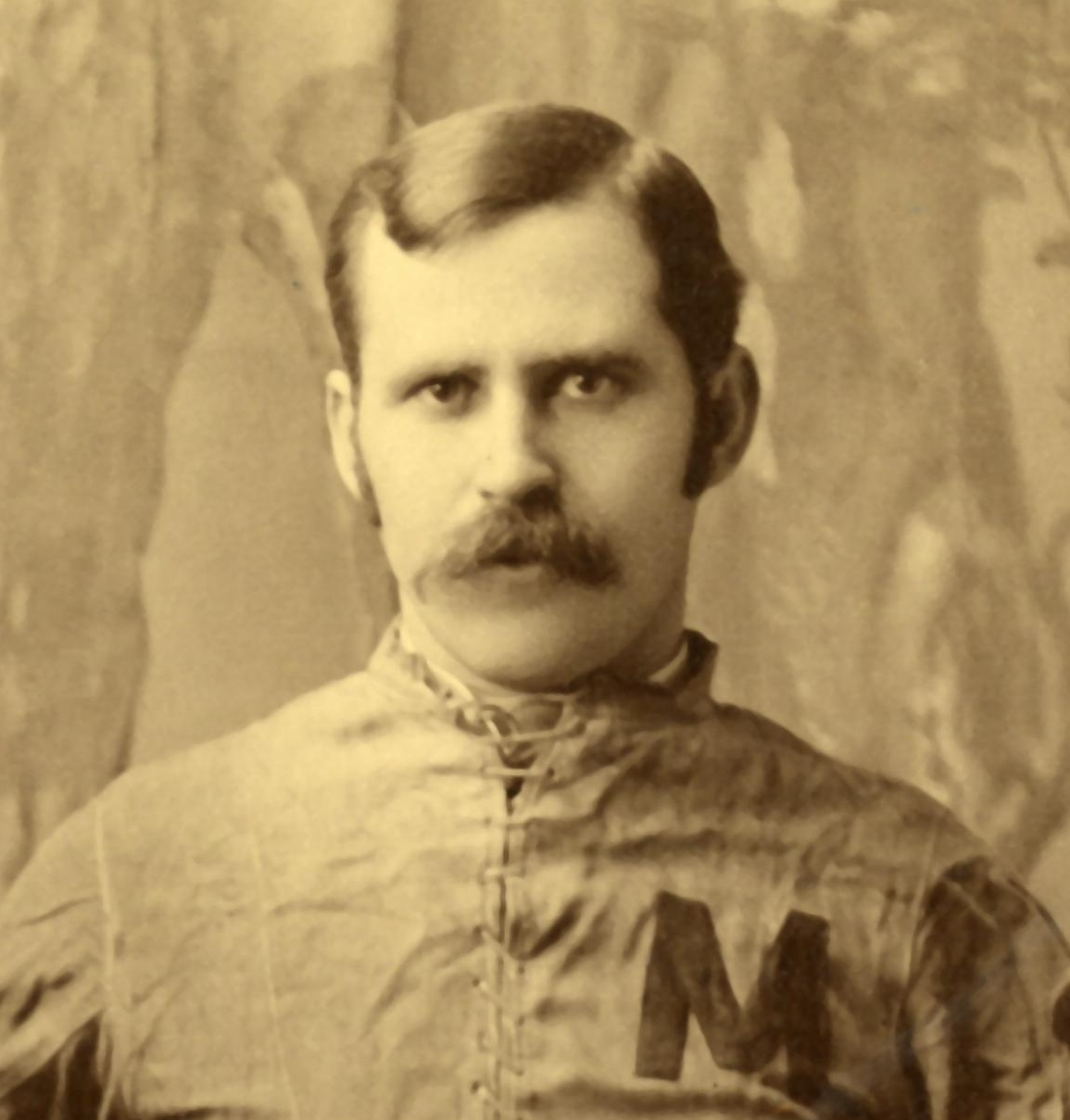
- Horace Prettyman cropped from 1890 University of Michigan team photograph
- Born: November 8, 1857; Stryker, Ohio
- Died: March 27, 1945 (aged 87); Ann Arbor, Michigan
- Citizenship: United States
- Education: University of Michigan
- Years active: 1882–1890
- Known for: College football player

Horace Greely Prettyman (November 8, 1857 – March 27, 1945) was an American football player in the early years of the sport. Prettyman won a record eight varsity letters at the University of Michigan, playing for the school's football team from 1882 to 1886 and 1888 to 1890. He was the team's captain in 1884, 1885, and 1886, and scored the first touchdown in the first game played at Michigan's first home football field in Ann Arbor. Prettyman later became a successful businessman and civic leader, operating a boarding house, a laundry service, a power company and the Ann Arbor Press, and holding office as an Ann Arbor city councilman, postmaster and Washtenaw County, Michigan supervisor.

== Early years ==
Prettyman was born in Stryker, Ohio, and raised in Bryan, Ohio. He was the son of Lewis Prettyman, a farmer, and Hannah (Kintigh) Prettyman.

== 1882 and 1883 football seasons ==
Prettyman attended Ann Arbor High School and subsequently enrolled in the University of Michigan in 1882 at age 24 and excelled as an athlete. In addition to football, Prettyman also won competitions in the hammer throw, boxing and wrestling. In 1882, Prettyman was a "rusher" for the Michigan football team. However, the team played no intercollegiate games.

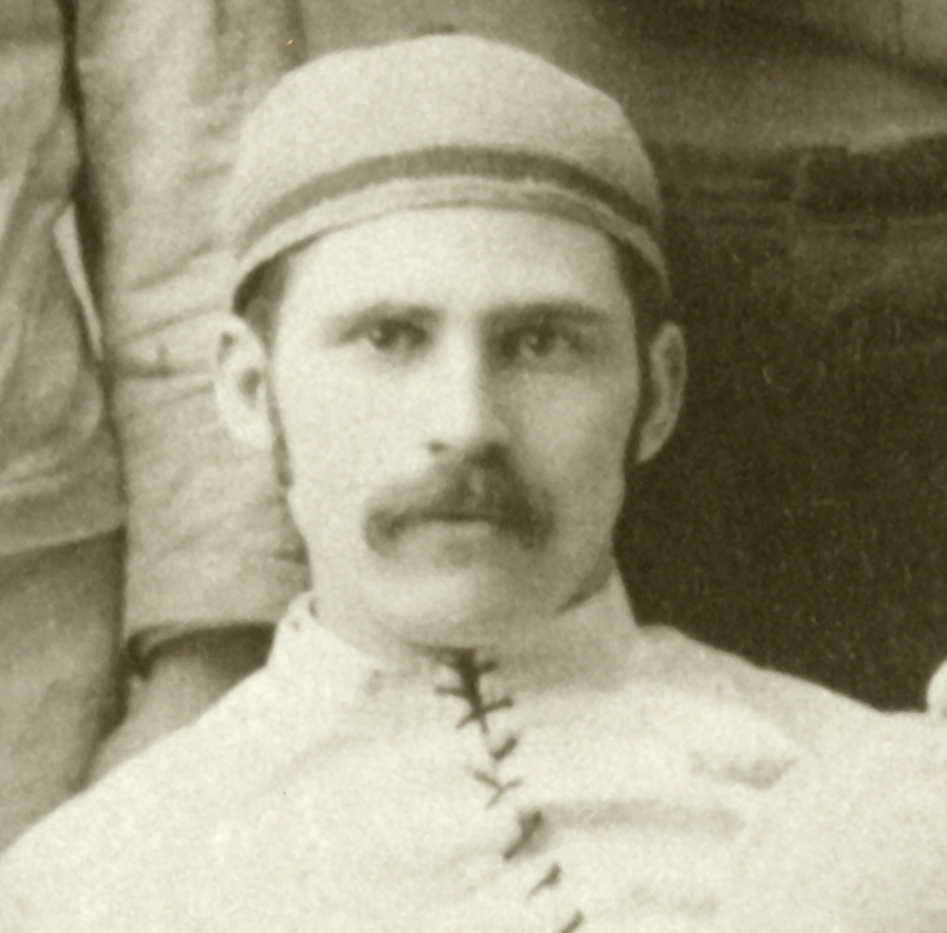
Horace Prettyman from 1883 team photograph.

In 1883, Michigan resumed a schedule of intercollegiate football, and Prettyman played "forward" for the team. According to The Michigan Daily, he was the first Ohioan to play for the Michigan football team. The team played its first ever home game at the Ann Arbor Fairgrounds in March 1883, a 40-5 win over the Detroit Independents. Prettyman scored the first touchdown at the Fairgrounds at the 14-minute mark of the "first inning" and went on to score a second touchdown before the end of the inning. The team played its remaining games as part of an Eastern trip in November 1883. The trip consisted of four road games in eight days at Wesleyan and Yale in Connecticut, Harvard in Massachusetts, and Stevens Institute in Hoboken, New Jersey. The trip cost $3,000 and was arranged "to both represent and advertise the college among the Eastern cities and universities." Prettyman was placed in charge of the trip, and The Michigan Argonaut praised his management: "All the boys are most hearty in their commendation of Prettyman's excellent management of the financial interests of the trip and his success is seen by the fact that every expense of the trip has been paid to the last cent."

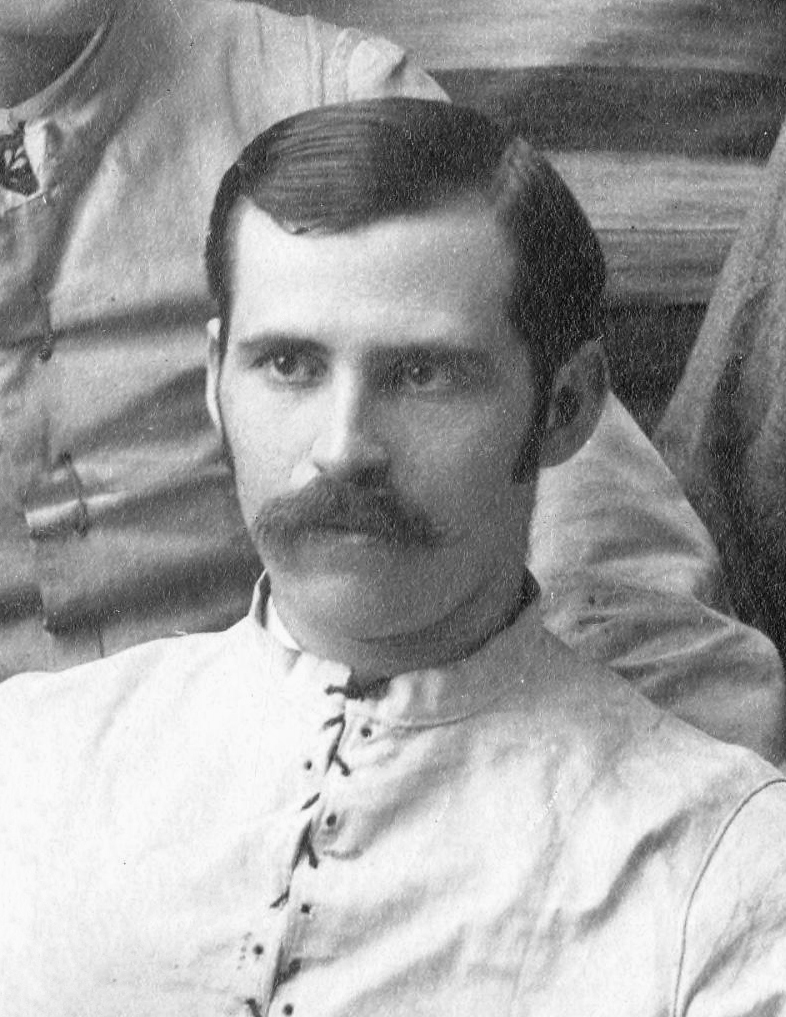
Prettyman from the 1884 team photograph

On the trip, the team lost to Yale 46–0, the worst defeat to that time in the history of Michigan football. The Yale game was played on a Saturday, and Michigan played Harvard the next day, losing 3–0. The second half was played largely in darkness, and the Boston Journal said of the play:

"All that could really be called a game was the first half before the intermission, the latter half being nothing more than a scramble because of the darkness. ... [T]he pitch dark for the whole of this half prevented the teams from distinguishing friend from foe. It was one continuous scramble, and the spectators were unable to distinguish any of the actions."

Late in the game, Michigan appeared to have scored the winning touchdown on a trick play, called "the time-honored fake run." Prettyman began running with teammate (and future Boston Red Sox owner) Henry Killilea behind him. Just before being tackled, Prettyman passed the ball to Killilea, who ran for the touchdown while Prettyman ran "head-on into the Harvard full-back." The Harvard umpire called the ball was "down" where Prettyman had been tackled, and the referee ordered it back to the midfield and called the game on account of darkness. Some claimed that the Harvard umpire had not seen the play due to the darkness, and had called Prettyman down at the urging of a Harvard player. The Michigan team arranged to stay and play another game the next day. However, according to a 1920 history of the University of Michigan, Harvard refused and instead "pleaded faculty interference and paid a $100 forfeit."

After the final game of the Eastern trip against Stevens Institute, The New York Times noted that Killilea and Prettyman "did some of the best work for the Michigan men in the way of running and tackling."

== 1884 and 1885 football seasons ==
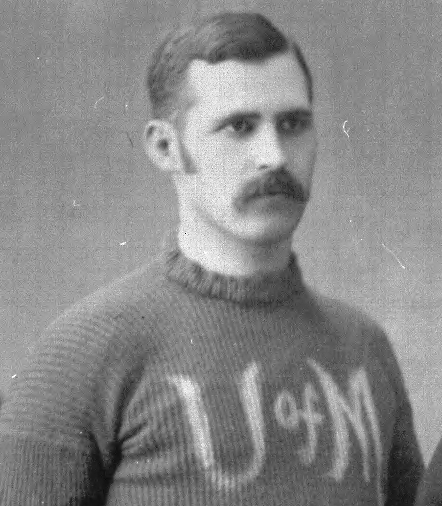
Prettyman from 1885 team photograph

In 1884, Prettyman was chosen as captain of the football team. The team won both of its intercollegiate games, including an 18 to 10 win in its first match against its eventual rival, the University of Chicago. The team beat Albion College 18 to 0 in its other game in 1884. Prettyman received his bachelor's degree in 1885, but stayed on at the university as a graduate student from 1885 to 1886. In 1885, Prettyman was again selected as captain and led the football team to its second consecutive undefeated season. The 1885 team did not allow its opponents to score a single point, outscoring them 82 to 0.

== 1886 football season ==
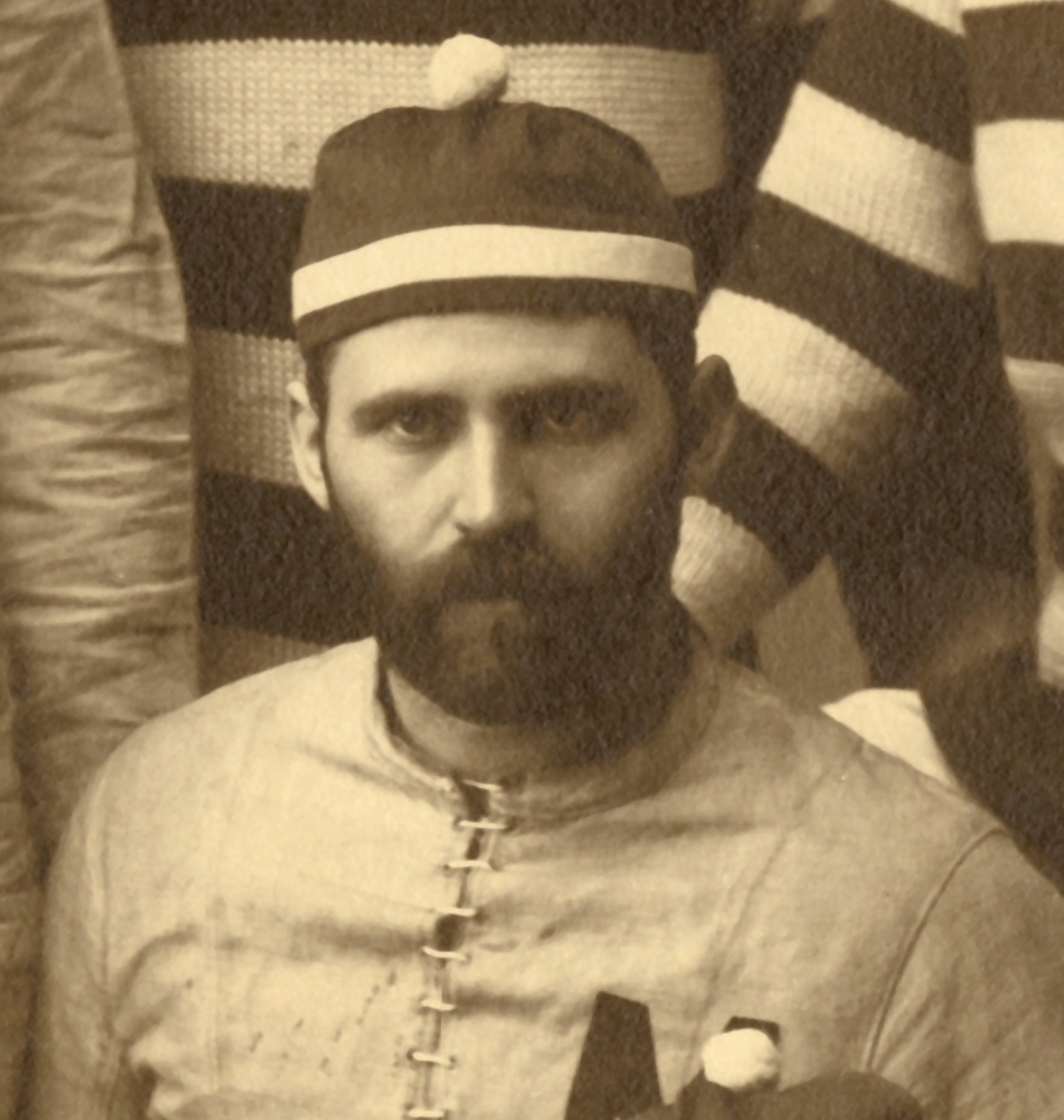
Prettyman sports a full beard in the 1888 team photograph

In 1886, Prettyman was selected as captain of the football team for the third straight year. No player before or since has been selected as captain of the Michigan football team more than twice. The 1886 team played two games, both against Albion College. Michigan won the first game at Albion by a score of 50 to 0. The Michigan Argonaut credited Prettyman for his fine play in the game. The second game was played at the Ann Arbor Fairgrounds as part of a "field day" that included various athletic events. Michigan won the football game 24 to 0, and the Argonaut reported that "Prettyman's play was characterized by his usual heavy rushing."

In Prettyman's three years as captain, Michigan never lost a game, winning seven games and losing none over the three-year span, and outscoring opponents 192 to 10.

== 1888 to 1890 football seasons ==
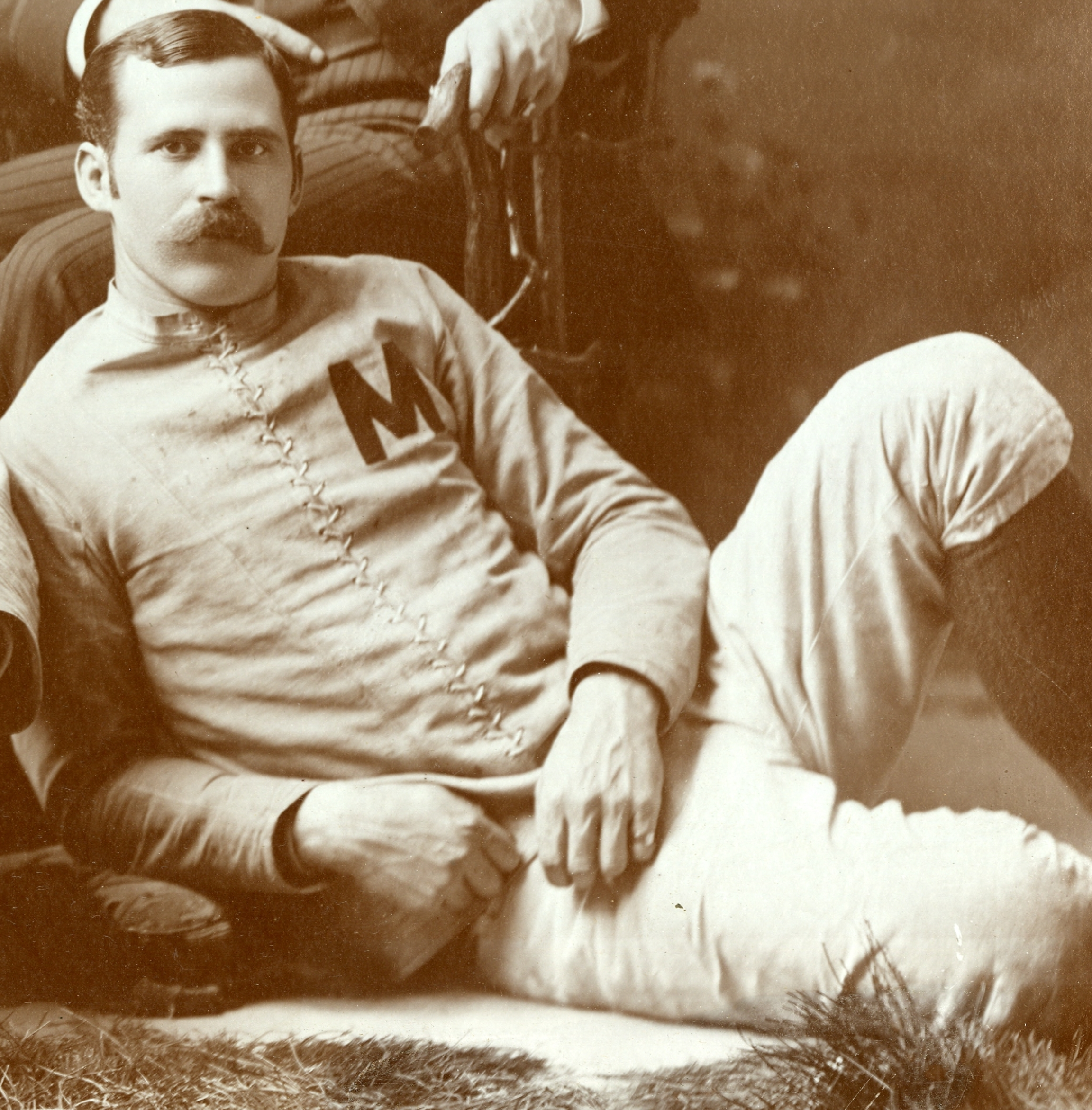
Prettyman from the 1889 team photograph

Prettyman worked as a traveling salesman from 1886 to 1887, general manager of Bulles & Co. (an Ann Arbor manufacturer of gelatin capsules) in 1888, and a real estate agent and hotel manager starting in 1889. Though he was no longer a student, college football eligibility standards were loose, and Prettyman returned to play three more years for Michigan, as the team's center in 1888, and as a tackle in 1889 and 1890.

In 1888, the team was undefeated, having beaten Notre Dame twice, going into the final game of the year against the University of Chicago. Michigan lost the game 26–4 in front of a crowd of 2,500 persons, and Prettyman was "disqualified for striking one of the U.C. team." The 1889 rematch against Chicago was played on icy grass and mud-colored snow with a 40-mile-an-hour wind. Prettyman was again involved in a fight that resulted in his expulsion from the game. One Chicago newspaper described the incident this way:

"In the main, the players kept their tempers very well during the excitement of the struggle but while the second half was in, Prettyman, the big rusher of the Michigan team who was mixed up in a fracas during the game of last year, forgot himself and slugged one of the Chicago men vigorously. This came near bringing on a fight and the crowd broke into the field and surrounded the players closely while the occupants of the grand stand hissed the unexpected display. The cooler players, however, quickly brought the others to their senses, and the tempest was soon over. The police cleared the field and play was resumed, but not until Prettyman had been ruled off and Hull substituted for him."

In 1890, Prettyman played as part of the first racially integrated football team at Michigan, alongside African-American teammate George Jewett.

As late as 1891, Prettyman was reportedly playing center on Michigan's second eleven. he also contributed to coaching the 1891 team and operated the team's training table.

== Family and later years ==
Prettyman married Jennie McNames in June 1887, and the two operated a boarding house at 602 Lawrence Street in Ann Arbor that was known as the Campus Club, also known as Prettyman's Boarding House. Mr. and Mrs. Prettyman charged $1.50 per week for a room and $2.50 per week for board. Since 1960, the building has served as the Stefan T. Vail Cooperative House. Prettyman was a member of the Ann Arbor City Council from 1891 to 1895, president of the Ann Arbor Municipal League from 1892 to 1894, and a Washtenaw County supervisor starting in 1901. Prettyman sold his boarding house to the University in 1914 and later became the principal owner and president of the Ann Arbor Press and the president of the White Swan Laundry and the Wolverine Power Company. He was also Ann Arbor's postmaster for a time starting in 1906. Prettyman died in March 1945 at age 87 at St. Joseph's Mercy Hospital in Ann Arbor.

== See also ==
- 1886 Michigan Wolverines football team
