= 1885 Penn Quakers football team =

American college football season

1885 Penn Quakers football
- Conference: Independent
- Record: 8–5
- Head coach: Frank Dole (1st season)
- Captain: Paul Thompson
- Home stadium: University Athletic Grounds

1885 college football records
	Conf.			Overall
Team	W	L	T	W		L		T
Princeton		–		9	–	0	–	0
Michigan		–		3	–	0	–	0
Colorado College		–		1	–	0	–	0
Yale		–		7	–	1	–	0
Cincinnati		–		1	–	0	–	1
Penn		–		8	–	5	–	0
Lafayette		–		3	–	2	–	1
Massachusetts		–		3	–	2	–	1
Johns Hopkins		–		2	–	2	–	0
Richmond		–		1	–	1	–	0
Wesleyan		–		3	–	4	–	0
Navy		–		1	–	2	–	0
Lehigh		–		1	–	5	–	1
Rutgers		–		0	–	1	–	0
Fordham		–		0	–	3	–	0

The 1885 Penn Quakers football team was an American football team that represented the University of Pennsylvania during the 1885 college football season. In its first year under head coach Frank Dole, the team compiled a 8–5 record. Paul Thompson was the team captain.

== Schedule ==
Date	Time	Opponent	Site	Result	Attendance	Source
October 2	3:30 p.m.	Germantown	University Athletic Grounds; Philadelphia, PA	W ?		
October 10	3:05 p.m.	Lehigh	University Athletic Grounds; Philadelphia, PA	W 54–0	500	
October 14	3:05 p.m.	Swarthmore	University Athletic Grounds; Philadelphia, PA	W 68–6		
October 17	3:40 p.m.	Graduates	University Athletic Grounds; Philadelphia, PA	W 42–0		
October 24	3:24 p.m. or 3:28 p.m.	vs. Princeton	University Athletic Grounds; Philadelphia, PA (rivalry)	L 10–72	900–1,000	
October 28	3:05 p.m.	at Lafayette	Easton, PA	W 30–22		
October 31		at Princeton	Princeton, NJ	L 10–80		
November 4	3:16 p.m.	Lafayette	University Athletic Grounds; Philadelphia, PA	W 54–10		
November 7	3:15 p.m., 3:20 p.m., or 3:25 p.m.	vs. Wesleyan	Polo Grounds; New York, NY	L 18–25	300	
November 14	2:00 p.m.	Yale	University Athletic Grounds; Philadelphia, PA	L 5–53		
November 18	2:30 p.m.	at Lehigh	Bethlehem, PA	W 35–0		
November 21		at Stevens	Hoboken, NJ	W 22–9		
November 26	2:45 p.m.	Princeton	University Athletic Grounds; Philadelphia, PA	L 0–57	2,500	
