= 1885 college football season =

American college football season

- 1885 Princeton Tigers
- Total No. of teams: 7
- Regular season: October 3 to November 26
- Champion: Princeton

The 1885 college football season had no clear-cut champion, with the Official NCAA Division I Football Records Book listing Princeton as having been selected national champions. The season was notable for one of the most celebrated football plays of the 19th century - a 90-yard punt return by Henry "Tillie" Lamar of Princeton in the closing minutes of the game against Yale. Trailing 5–0, Princeton dropped two men back to receive a Yale punt. The punt glanced off one returner's shoulder and was caught by the other, Lamar, on the dead run. Lamar streaked down the left sideline, until hemmed in by two Princeton players, then cut sharply to the middle of the field, ducking under their arms and breaking loose for the touchdown. After the controversy of a darkness-shortened Yale-Princeton championship game the year before that was ruled "no contest," a record crowd turned out for the 1885 game. For the first time, the game was played on one of the campuses instead of at a neutral site, and emerged as a major social event, attracting ladies to its audience as well as students and male spectators. The Lamar punt return furnished the most spectacular ending to any football game played to that point, and did much to popularize the sport of college football to the general public.

== Conference and program changes ==
School	1884 Conference	1885 Conference
Williams Ephs	Independent	Northern Intercollegiate Football Association
Tufts Jumbos	Independent	Northern Intercollegiate Football Association

== Conference standings ==
The following is a potentially incomplete list of conference standings:

1885 college football records
	Conf.			Overall
Team	W	L	T	W		L		T
Princeton		–		9	–	0	–	0
Michigan		–		3	–	0	–	0
Colorado College		–		1	–	0	–	0
Yale		–		7	–	1	–	0
Cincinnati		–		1	–	0	–	1
Penn		–		8	–	5	–	0
Lafayette		–		3	–	2	–	1
Massachusetts		–		3	–	2	–	1
Johns Hopkins		–		2	–	2	–	0
Richmond		–		1	–	1	–	0
Wesleyan		–		3	–	4	–	0
Navy		–		1	–	2	–	0
Lehigh		–		1	–	5	–	1
Rutgers		–		0	–	1	–	0
Fordham		–		0	–	3	–	0

1885 Northern Intercollegiate Football Association standings
	Conf.					Overall
Team	W		L		T	W		L		T
Williams $	6	–	1	–	0	6	–	1	–	0
Boston Tech	5	–	2	–	0	6	–	3	–	0
Tufts	2	–	4	–	0	2	–	4	–	0
Amherst	0	–	6	–	0	1	–	8	–	1
$ – Conference champion
