= 1886 Dartmouth football team =

American college football season

1886 Dartmouth football
- Conference: Independent
- Record: 2–2
- Head coach: None
- Captain: William Odlin

1886 Eastern college football independents records
| | Conf. | | | Overall |
| Team | W | L | T | W | | L | | T |
|---|---|---|---|---|---|---|---|---|
| Yale | | – | | 9 | – | 0 | – | 1 |
| Princeton | | – | | 7 | – | 0 | – | 1 |
| Harvard | | – | | 12 | – | 2 | – | 0 |
| Lafayette | | – | | 10 | – | 2 | – | 0 |
| Williams | | – | | 5 | – | 1 | – | 1 |
| Massachusetts | | – | | 2 | – | 1 | – | 0 |
| Penn | | – | | 9 | – | 7 | – | 1 |
| Lehigh | | – | | 4 | – | 3 | – | 1 |
| Dartmouth | | – | | 2 | – | 2 | – | 0 |
| Amherst | | – | | 3 | – | 4 | – | 0 |
| Rutgers | | – | | 1 | – | 3 | – | 0 |
| Wesleyan | | – | | 2 | – | 6 | – | 0 |
| Boston Tech | | – | | 2 | – | 6 | – | 1 |
| Vermont | | – | | 0 | – | 1 | – | 0 |
| Stevens | | – | | 0 | – | 7 | – | 1 |
| Tufts | | – | | 0 | – | 8 | – | 0 |
| NYU | | – | | 0 | – | 3 | – | 0 |
| Swarthmore | | – | | | | – |
| Trinity (CT) | | – | | | | – |

The 1886 Dartmouth football team represented Dartmouth College in the 1886 college football season. Dartmouth compiled a record of 2–2.

== Schedule ==
| Date | Time | Opponent | Site | Result | Attendance | Source |
|---|---|---|---|---|---|---|
| October 28 | | at Phillips Andover Academy | Andover, MA | L 11–18 | | |
| October 29 | 3:00 p.m. | at Boston Tech | Union Grounds; Boston, MA | W 11–6 | | |
| October 30 | 4:15 p.m. | at Harvard | Jarvis Field; Cambridge, MA (rivalry) | L 0–70 | 75 | |
| November 6 | | at Vermont | Burlington, VT | W 91–0 | | |
