= 1886 Rutgers Queensmen football team =

American college football season

1886 Rutgers Queensmen football
- Conference: Independent
- Record: 1–3
- Head coach: None
- Captain: Asa Wynkoop
- Home stadium: College Field

1886 Eastern college football independents records
	Conf.			Overall
Team	W	L	T	W		L		T
Yale		–		9	–	0	–	1
Princeton		–		7	–	0	–	1
Harvard		–		12	–	2	–	0
Lafayette		–		10	–	2	–	0
Williams		–		5	–	1	–	1
Massachusetts		–		2	–	1	–	0
Penn		–		9	–	7	–	1
Lehigh		–		4	–	3	–	1
Dartmouth		–		2	–	2	–	0
Amherst		–		3	–	4	–	0
Rutgers		–		1	–	3	–	0
Wesleyan		–		2	–	6	–	0
MIT		–		2	–	6	–	1
Vermont		–		0	–	1	–	0
Stevens		–		0	–	7	–	1
Tufts		–		0	–	8	–	0
NYU		–		0	–	3	–	0
Swarthmore		–				–
Trinity (CT)		–				–

The 1886 Rutgers Queensmen football team was an American football team that represented Rutgers University as an independent during the 1886 college football season. The team compiled a 1–3 record and was outscored by a total of 115 to 70. The team had no coach, and its captain was Asa Wynkoop.

== Schedule ==
Date	Time	Opponent	Site	Result	Source
October 16		at Lafayette	Easton, PA	L 2–24	
November 6		Vineland	New Brunswick, NJ	W 58–0	
November 10	3:30 p.m.	at Penn	Philadelphia, PA	L 0–65	
November 17		Lafayette	New Brunswick, NJ	L 10–26	
