= 1886 Lafayette football team =

American college football season

1886 Lafayette football
- Conference: Independent
- Record: 10–2
- Head coach: None
- Captain: Frederick Gutelius

1886 Eastern college football independents records
	Conf.			Overall
Team	W	L	T	W		L		T
Yale		–		9	–	0	–	1
Princeton		–		7	–	0	–	1
Harvard		–		12	–	2	–	0
Lafayette		–		10	–	2	–	0
Williams		–		5	–	1	–	1
Massachusetts		–		2	–	1	–	0
Penn		–		9	–	7	–	1
Lehigh		–		4	–	3	–	1
Dartmouth		–		2	–	2	–	0
Amherst		–		3	–	4	–	0
Rutgers		–		1	–	3	–	0
Wesleyan		–		2	–	6	–	0
MIT		–		2	–	6	–	1
Vermont		–		0	–	1	–	0
Stevens		–		0	–	7	–	1
Tufts		–		0	–	8	–	0
NYU		–		0	–	3	–	0
Swarthmore		–				–
Trinity (CT)		–				–

The 1886 Lafayette football team was an American football team that represented Lafayette College as an independent during the 1886 college football season. Playing without a regular coach, the team compiled a 10–2 record and outscored opponents by a total of 211 to 75.

== Schedule ==
Date	Time	Opponent	Site	Result	Source
October 13		at Swarthmore	Swarthmore, PA	W 20–12	
October 16		Rutgers	Easton, PA	W 28–2	
October 18		Dickinson	Easton, PA	W 24–5	
October 20		Penn	Easton, PA	W 12–0	
October 23		at Stevens	Hoboken, NJ	W 5–0	
October 30	3:40 p.m.	at Penn	University Athletic Grounds; Philadelphia, PA	L 10–20	
November 6		Lehigh	Easton, PA	W 12–0	
November 11		at Trinity (CT)	Ward Street grounds; Hartford, CT	W 12–0	
November 13		at Wesleyan	Middletown, CT	L 0–26	
November 17		at Rutgers	New Brunswick, NJ	W 26–10	
November 20		Stevens	Easton, PA	W 58–0	
November 24		at Lehigh	Bethlehem, PA	W 4–0	
