= 1886 Harvard Crimson football team =

American college football season

1886 Harvard Crimson football
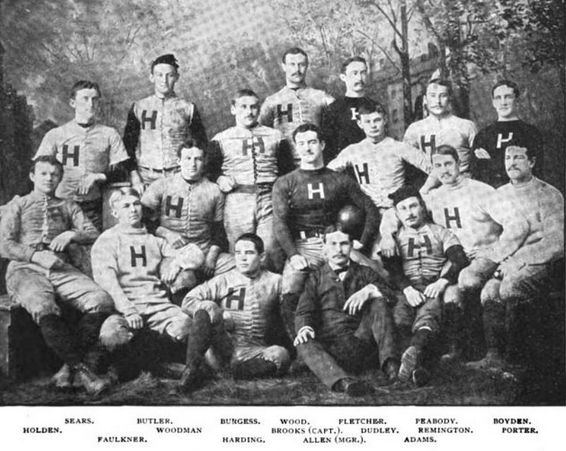
- Conference: Independent
- Record: 12–2
- Head coach: Frank A. Mason (1st season)
- Captain: William A. Brooks
- Home stadium: Jarvis Field

1886 Eastern college football independents records
	Conf.			Overall
Team	W	L	T	W		L		T
Yale		–		9	–	0	–	1
Princeton		–		7	–	0	–	1
Harvard		–		12	–	2	–	0
Lafayette		–		10	–	2	–	0
Williams		–		5	–	1	–	1
Massachusetts		–		2	–	1	–	0
Penn		–		9	–	7	–	1
Lehigh		–		4	–	3	–	1
Dartmouth		–		2	–	2	–	0
Rutgers		–		1	–	3	–	0
Wesleyan		–		2	–	6	–	0
Vermont		–		0	–	1	–	0
Stevens		–		0	–	7	–	1
Tufts		–		0	–	8	–	0
NYU		–		0	–	3	–	0
Swarthmore		–				–
Trinity (CT)		–				–

The 1886 Harvard Crimson football team represented Harvard University in the 1886 college football season. The team finished with a 12–2 record and outscored opponents 765 to 41 under first-year head coach Frank A. Mason. On November 3, 1886, in a game played at Exeter, New Hampshire, the Crimson defeated the team from Phillips Exeter Academy by a score of 158-0, the highest point total ever achieved in a football game to that point. The team's two losses were against rivals Princeton (0–12) and Yale (4–29). Princeton and Yale are recognized by various selectors as the 1886 national champions.

== Schedule ==
Date	Time	Opponent	Site	Result	Attendance	Source
October 6		Tufts	Cambridge, MA	W 82–0		
October 9		at Boston Tech	Union Grounds; Boston, MA	W 54–0		
October 13	4:05 p.m.	Tufts	Jarvis Field; Cambridge, MA	W 46–0		
October 16	3:00 p.m.	Stevens	Jarvis Field; Cambridge, MA	W 44–0		
October 20	4:05 p.m.	Boston Tech	Jarvis Field; Cambridge, MA	W 59–0		
October 23		at Andover	Andover, MA	W 86–0		
October 30	4:15 p.m.	Dartmouth	Jarvis Field; Cambridge, MA (rivalry)	W 70–0	75	
November 3		at Phillips Exeter	Exeter, NH	W 158–0		
November 6		Wesleyan	Jarvis Field; Cambridge, MA	W 34–0		
November 8		Harvard alumni	Jarvis Field; Cambridge, MA	W 38–0		
November 13	2:30 p.m.	at Princeton	Princeton, NJ (rivalry)	L 0–12		
November 17	2:55 p.m.	at Boston Tech	Union Grounds; Boston, MA	W 62–0		
November 20	2:30 p.m.	Yale	Jarvis Field; Cambridge, MA (rivalry)	L 4–29	> 6,000	
November 25		at Penn	University athletic grounds; Philadelphia, PA (rivalry)	W 28–0	2,000–3,000	

== Roster ==
- George C. Adams
- Bancroft
- Boyden
- William A. Brooks
- Burgess
- Butler
- Dudley
- Faulkner
- Fletcher
- Harding
- Holden
- Peabody
- Perry
- Porter
- Remmington
- Sears
- Smith
- Francis Woodman
