= 1886 Vermont Green and Gold football team =

American college football season

1886 Vermont Green and Gold football
- Conference: Independent
- Record: 0–1
- Head coach: None

1886 Eastern college football independents records
	Conf.			Overall
Team	W	L	T	W		L		T
Yale		–		9	–	0	–	1
Princeton		–		7	–	0	–	1
Harvard		–		12	–	2	–	0
Lafayette		–		10	–	2	–	0
Williams		–		5	–	1	–	1
Massachusetts		–		2	–	1	–	0
Penn		–		9	–	7	–	1
Lehigh		–		4	–	3	–	1
Dartmouth		–		2	–	2	–	0
Amherst		–		3	–	4	–	0
Rutgers		–		1	–	3	–	0
Wesleyan		–		2	–	6	–	0
MIT		–		2	–	6	–	1
Vermont		–		0	–	1	–	0
Stevens		–		0	–	7	–	1
Tufts		–		0	–	8	–	0
NYU		–		0	–	3	–	0
Swarthmore		–				–
Trinity (CT)		–				–

The 1886 Vermont Green and Gold football team represented the University of Vermont during the 1886 college football season. The first intercollegiate game in the state of Vermont happened on November 6, 1886, between Dartmouth and Vermont at Burlington, Vermont. Dartmouth won 91 to 0.

== Schedule ==
Date	Opponent	Site	Result
November 6	Dartmouth	Burlington, VT	L 0–91

== See also ==
- List of the first college football game in each US state
