= 1886 Penn Quakers football team =

American college football season

1886 Penn Quakers football
- Conference: Independent
- Record: 9–7–1
- Head coach: Frank Dole (2nd season)
- Home stadium: University Athletic Grounds

1886 Eastern college football independents records
	Conf.			Overall
Team	W	L	T	W		L		T
Yale		–		9	–	0	–	1
Princeton		–		7	–	0	–	1
Harvard		–		12	–	2	–	0
Lafayette		–		10	–	2	–	0
Williams		–		5	–	1	–	1
Massachusetts		–		2	–	1	–	0
Penn		–		9	–	7	–	1
Lehigh		–		4	–	3	–	1
Dartmouth		–		2	–	2	–	0
Rutgers		–		1	–	3	–	0
Wesleyan		–		2	–	6	–	0
Vermont		–		0	–	1	–	0
Stevens		–		0	–	7	–	1
Tufts		–		0	–	8	–	0
NYU		–		0	–	3	–	0
Swarthmore		–				–
Trinity (CT)		–				–

The 1886 Penn Quakers football team was an American football team that represented the University of Pennsylvania during the 1886 college football season. In its second year under head coach Frank Dole, the team compiled a 9–7–1 record.

== Schedule ==
Date	Time	Opponent	Site	Result	Attendance	Source
September 30		Falls of Schuylkill	Philadelphia, PA	W 62–0		
October 2	3:30 p.m.	Tioga Athletic Association	University Athletic Grounds; Philadelphia, PA	W 22–0		
October 6		Swarthmore	Philadelphia, PA	Cancelled		
October 9	3:20 p.m.	Lehigh	University Athletic Grounds; Philadelphia, PA	W 26–4	200	
October 11	3:35 p.m.	Graduates	University Athletic Grounds; Philadelphia, PA	W 4–0		
October 13	4:30 p.m.	All-Philadelphia	University Athletic Grounds; Philadelphia, PA	T 6–6		
October 16		at Princeton	Princeton, NJ (rivalry)	L 0–30		
October 20		at Lafayette	Easton, PA	L 0–12		
October 23	3:40 p.m.	Princeton	University Athletic Grounds; Philadelphia, PA	L 9–55		
October 27	3:00 p.m.	vs. Wesleyan	Polo Grounds; New York, NY	W 14–0		
October 30	3:40 p.m.	Lafayette	University Athletic Grounds; Philadelphia, PA	W 20–10		
November 3	3:15 p.m. or 4:20 p.m.	Haverford	University Athletic Grounds; Philadelphia, PA	W 16–4		
November 6	3:10 p.m.	Princeton	University Athletic Grounds; Philadelphia, PA	L 6–28	1,500	
November 10	3:30 p.m.	Rutgers	Philadelphia, PA	W 65–0		
November 13		at Yale	Yale Field; New Haven, CT	L 0–75		
November 15		Vineland College	Philadelphia, PA	W 92–0		
November 18		at Lehigh	Bethlehem, PA	L 0–28		
November 20	3:15 p.m.	at Pennsylvania Military Academy	Pennsylvania Military Academy grounds; Chester, PA	6–6 (Note: Game ended prematurely in a dispute and is not included in Penn's official football records.)		
November 25		at Harvard	Jarvis Field; Cambridge, MA (rivalry)	L 0–28		
