= 1886 Stevens football team =

American college football season

1886 Stevens football
- Conference: Independent
- Record: 0–7–1
- Head coach: Unknown
- Home stadium: St. George's Cricket Grounds

1886 Eastern college football independents records
	Conf.			Overall
Team	W	L	T	W		L		T
Yale		–		9	–	0	–	1
Princeton		–		7	–	0	–	1
Harvard		–		12	–	2	–	0
Lafayette		–		10	–	2	–	0
Williams		–		5	–	1	–	1
Massachusetts		–		2	–	1	–	0
Penn		–		9	–	7	–	1
Lehigh		–		4	–	3	–	1
Dartmouth		–		2	–	2	–	0
Rutgers		–		1	–	3	–	0
Wesleyan		–		2	–	6	–	0
Vermont		–		0	–	1	–	0
Stevens		–		0	–	7	–	1
Tufts		–		0	–	8	–	0
NYU		–		0	–	3	–	0
Swarthmore		–				–
Trinity (CT)		–				–

The 1886 Stevens football team represented Stevens Institute of Technology as an independent during the 1886 college football season. The team compiled a 0–7–1 record and was outscored by its opponents, 194 to 6. They were also shut out in seven of their eight contests, nearly avoiding a scoreless year with a 61–6 loss to national champion Princeton.

== Schedule ==
Date	Time	Opponent	Site	Result	Attendance	Source
October 9		at Princeton	Princeton College grounds; Princeton, NJ	L 0–58		
October 13		Princeton	St. George's Cricket Grounds; Hoboken, NJ	L 0–61	300	
October 16	3:00 p.m.	at Harvard	Jarvis Field; Cambridge, MA	L 0–44		
October 20		Yale	Hoboken, NJ	L 0–54		
October 23		Lafayette	Hoboken, NJ	L 0–5		
October 30		Lehigh	Hoboken, NJ	T 0–0		
November 13		at Lehigh	Bethlehem, PA	L 0–14		
November 20		at Lafayette	Easton, PA	L 0–58		

== Crickets of Stevens Institute ==
1886 American Football Union standings
	Conf.					Overall
Team	W		L		T	W		L		T
Crickets of Stevens Institute $	3	–	0	–	0	4	–	1	–	0
Staten Island Football Club	1	–	2	–	2	2	–	3	–	3
Unions of Columbia	1	–	2	–	0	1	–	3	–	0
Brooklyn Hill	0	–	1	–	2	3	–	5	–	3
Cutler School	0	–	0	–	0	–	–	–	–	–
Spartan Harriers	0	–	0	–	0	–	–	–	–	–

The Stevens Institute also operated a second team known as the Crickets, who joined the American Football Union for their inaugural 1886 season. The Crickets compiled a 4–1 record against their opponents in the American Football Union (Their official AFU record would be 3–0, as the Brooklyn Hill contest on October 10 was before the AFU championship series began and November 6 match against the Staten Island Football Club was declared off by the AFU Executive Committee because of poor officiating), and that was enough to crown them Union champions for the season, and to receive the AFU championship pennant in January of the next year.

Date	Time	Opponent	Site	Result	Source
October 10		Brooklyn Hill*	Parade Grounds, Prospect Park; Brooklyn, NY	W 22–6	
October 16	4:00 p.m.	Brooklyn Hill	Parade Grounds, Prospect Park; Brooklyn, NY	W 8–6 (8–10 disputed)	
October 23		Staten Island Football Club	Staten Island, NY	Unknown	
October 30		Unions of Columbia		Likely postponed	
November 2		Unions of Columbia	St. George Cricket Grounds; Hoboken, NJ	W 13–6	
November 6		at Staten Island Football Club*	Hoboken, NJ	L 4–10	
December 4		Staten Island Football Club	St. George; Staten Island, NY	W 10–0	
*Non-conference game
