= 1886 Princeton Tigers football team =

American college football season

1886 Princeton Tigers football

National champion (Billingsley) Co-national champion (Davis)
- Conference: Independent
- Record: 7–0–1
- Head coach: None
- Captain: Henry Savage

1886 Eastern college football independents records
	Conf.			Overall
Team	W	L	T	W		L		T
Yale		–		9	–	0	–	1
Princeton		–		7	–	0	–	1
Harvard		–		12	–	2	–	0
Lafayette		–		10	–	2	–	0
Williams		–		5	–	1	–	1
Massachusetts		–		2	–	1	–	0
Penn		–		9	–	7	–	1
Lehigh		–		4	–	3	–	1
Dartmouth		–		2	–	2	–	0
Amherst		–		3	–	4	–	0
Rutgers		–		1	–	3	–	0
Wesleyan		–		2	–	6	–	0
MIT		–		2	–	6	–	1
Vermont		–		0	–	1	–	0
Stevens		–		0	–	7	–	1
Tufts		–		0	–	8	–	0
NYU		–		0	–	3	–	0
Swarthmore		–				–
Trinity (CT)		–				–

The 1886 Princeton Tigers football team represented Princeton University in the 1886 college football season. The team finished with a 7–0–1 record and was retroactively named as the national champion by the Billingsley Report and as a co-national champion by Parke H. Davis.

On Thanksgiving Day in Princeton, New Jersey, undefeated teams from Yale and Princeton met. The game started late due to the absence of a referee, and heavy rain caused the game to be called on account of darkness with Yale leading 4–0 in the second half. Under the rules of the time, the game was declared "no contest" by the substitute referee, and the final score was declared to be 0–0. After a special meeting of the Intercollegiate Football Association held to review the game, the Association issued a two-part resolution: that (1) Yale should have been acknowledged the winner, but that (2) under their existing rules, the Association did not have the authority to award the game to them.

== Schedule ==
Date	Time	Opponent	Site	Result	Attendance	Source
October 9		Stevens	Princeton College grounds; Princeton, NJ	W 58–0		
October 13		at Stevens	St. George's Cricket Grounds; Hoboken, NJ	W 61–0	300	
October 16		Penn	Princeton, NJ (rivalry)	W 30–0		
October 23	3:40 p.m.	at Penn	University Athletic Grounds; Philadelphia, PA	W 55–9		
November 6	3:10 p.m.	at Penn	University Athletic Grounds; Philadelphia, PA	W 28–6	1,500	
November 13	2:30 p.m.	Harvard	Princeton, NJ (rivalry)	W 12–0		
November 20	3:00 p.m.	vs. Wesleyan	Hartford, CT	W 70–6		
November 25	3:30 p.m.	Yale	Princeton, NJ (rivalry)	T 0–0	> 6,000	

== Roster ==
- Knowlton Ames
- Black
- Church
- Cook
- Hector Cowan
- William George
- Hirst
- H. Hodge
- R. Hodge
- William Mann Irvine
- McCance
- Moore
- Price
- Savage
- Sloan
- Spiel
- F. Spalding
- W. Spalding
- Woody Wagenhorst
