= Frank A. Mason =

American football player, coach, and attorney (1862–1940)

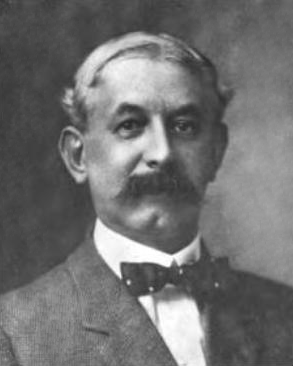

Biographical details
- Born: April 12, 1862; Newton, Massachusetts, U.S.
- Died: June 29, 1940 (aged 78); Newton, Massachusetts, U.S.

Playing career
- 1881–1884: Harvard
- Position: Quarterback

Coaching career (HC unless noted)
- 1886: Harvard
- 1907: Ole Miss

Head coaching record
- Overall: 12–8

Frank Atlee Mason (April 12, 1862 – June 29, 1940) was an American college football coach and an attorney. He was the first full-time football coach at Harvard University.

== Early life ==
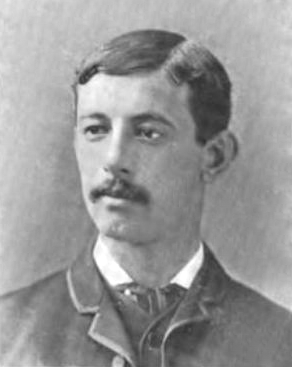
As a Harvard undergraduate

Mason was born on April 12, 1862, in Newton, Massachusetts, to David H. Mason and Sarah Wilson White. He attended Harvard University and played on the school's baseball and football teams. In football, he played quarterback and excelled at the quarterback kick. He graduated from Harvard in 1884 and later attended Harvard Law School and Boston University School of Law.

== Coaching career ==
In the fall of 1886, Mason was named Harvard's head football coach by team captain William A. Brooks. This was the first time in school history that the football team had a full-time head coach (Lucius Littauer coached on several occasions in 1881, but did not coach the team full-time). The Crimson went 12–2 under Mason, but returned to coaching by captains the next season.

In 1907, Mason returned to coaching at Ole Miss. In Mason's only season as head coach, Ole Miss went 0–6. In what would be his final game as head coach, Ole Miss faced rival Mississippi A&M on a cold, wet Thanksgiving Day. Before the second half began, Mason brought out an urn filled with whisky-laced coffee in an attempt to warm his players. Sloppy second-half play resulted in a 15 to 0 Ole Miss loss. After the game, many of the players blamed Mason for the loss and when asked if the team was returning home that night, Mason was quoted as saying "Yes, the team is going north at 11 o'clock. I'm going in another direction, and hope I never see them again!"

== Legal career ==
In 1888 Mason was admitted to the Suffolk County Bar. He had a law office at 31 Milk Street in Boston, where he practiced probate and conveyancing. From 1900 until his retirement in 1933 he was the legal counsel for Newton Savings Bank.

== Personal life ==
Mason was the son of David H. Mason, an attorney and politician who served on the Massachusetts Board of Education, in the Massachusetts House of Representatives, and later as the United States Attorney for the District of Massachusetts. One of Mason's brothers was Edward Haven Mason, an attorney and philatelist. Mason was a direct descendant of John Winthrop.

Mason married Lilian Balch on October 6, 1897. They had two daughters, Mabel and Eleanor.

He died on June 29, 1940, in Newton, Massachusetts.

== Head coaching record ==
Year	Team	Overall	Conference	Standing	Bowl/playoffs
Harvard Crimson (Independent) (1886)
1886	Harvard	12–2			
Harvard:		12–2			
Ole Miss Rebels (Southern Intercollegiate Athletic Association) (1907)
1907	Ole Miss	0–6	0–5	15th	
Ole Miss:		0–6	0–5		
Total:		12–8			
