= 1886 Yale Bulldogs football team =

American college football season

1886 Yale Bulldogs football
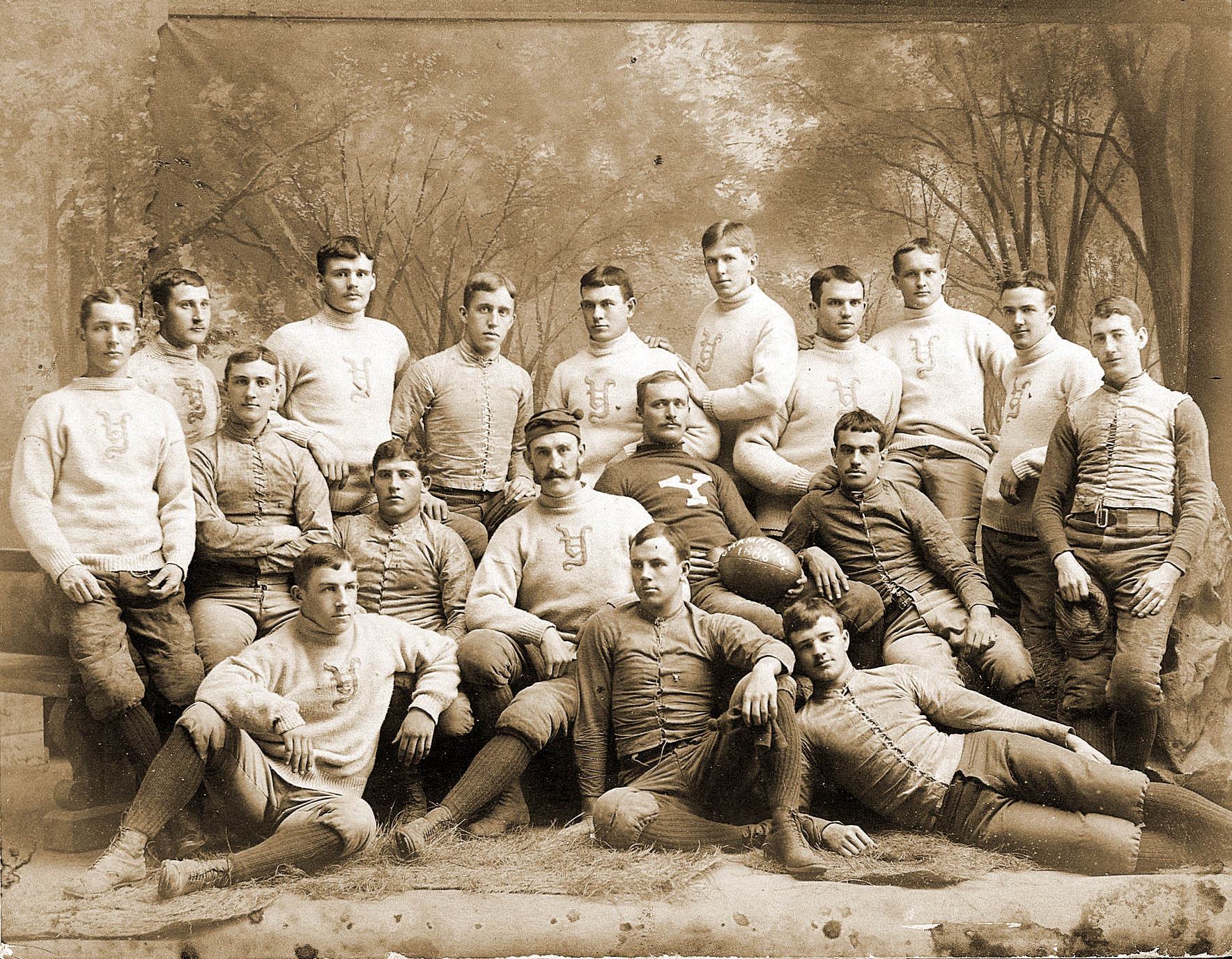

National champion (Helms, NCF) Co-national champion (Davis) IFA co-champion
- Conference: Intercollegiate Football Association
- Record: 9–0–1 ( IFA)
- Head coach: None
- Captain: Robert Corwin
- Home stadium: Yale Field

1886 Eastern college football independents records
	Conf.			Overall
Team	W	L	T	W		L		T
Yale		–		9	–	0	–	1
Princeton		–		7	–	0	–	1
Harvard		–		12	–	2	–	0
Lafayette		–		10	–	2	–	0
Williams		–		5	–	1	–	1
Massachusetts		–		2	–	1	–	0
Penn		–		9	–	7	–	1
Lehigh		–		4	–	3	–	1
Dartmouth		–		2	–	2	–	0
Rutgers		–		1	–	3	–	0
Wesleyan		–		2	–	6	–	0
Vermont		–		0	–	1	–	0
Stevens		–		0	–	7	–	1
Tufts		–		0	–	8	–	0
NYU		–		0	–	3	–	0
Swarthmore		–				–
Trinity (CT)		–				–

The 1886 Yale Bulldogs football team was an American football team that represented Yale University as a member of the Intercollegiate Football Association (IFA) during the 1886 college football season. The team finished with a 9–0–1 record, shut out nine of ten opponents, and outscored all opponents by a total of 687 to 4. Robert Corwin was the team captain.

There was no contemporaneous system in 1887 for determining a national champion. However, Yale was retroactively named as the national champion by the Helms Athletic Foundation and National Championship Foundation and a co-national champion by Parke H. Davis.

On Thanksgiving Day in Princeton, New Jersey, undefeated teams from Yale and Princeton met. The game started late due to the absence of a referee, and heavy rain caused the game to be called on account of darkness with Yale leading 4–0 in the second half. Under the rules of the time, the game was declared "no contest" by the substitute referee, and the final score was declared to be 0–0. After a special meeting of the Intercollegiate Football Association held to review the game, the Association issued a two-part resolution: that (1) Yale should have been acknowledged the winner, but that (2) under their existing rules, the Association did not have the authority to award the game to them.

== Schedule ==
Date	Time	Opponent	Site	Result	Attendance	Source
October 6		Wesleyan	Yale Field; New Haven, CT	W 75–0		
October 9		at Wesleyan	Middletown, CT	W 62–0		
October 16		Boston Tech	Yale Field; New Haven, CT	W 96–0		
October 20		at Stevens	Hoboken, NJ	W 54–0		
October 23		at Williams	Williamstown, MA	W 76–0		
October 30		Wesleyan	Yale Field; New Haven, CT	W 136–0		
November 2		at Crescent Athletic Club	Polo Grounds; New York, NY	W 82–0		
November 13		Penn	Yale Field; New Haven, CT	W 75–0		
November 20	2:30 p.m.	at Harvard	Jarvis Field; Cambridge, MA (rivalry)	W 29–4	> 6,000	
November 25	3:30 p.m.	at Princeton	Princeton, NJ (rivalry)	T 0–0	> 6,000	

== Roster ==
- Harry Beecher, QB
- James J. Buchanan, G
- William T. Bull, FB
- Edward L. Burke. T
- George R. Carter, G
- William Herbert Corbin, C
- Robert N. Corwin, E
- Charles O. Gill, T
- Robert F. Griggs
- Samuel B. Morison, HB
- Francis C. Pratt, FB
- Henry S. Robinson, E
- Amos Alonzo Stagg
- Horatio N. Strait
- Frederick W. Wallace, E
- George A. Watkinson, HB
- George Washington Woodruff, G
- William Wurtenburg, HB
