= 1886 Navy Midshipmen football team =

American college football season

1886 Navy Midshipmen football
- Conference: Independent
- Record: 3–3
- Head coach: None
- Captain: Clarance Stone
- Home stadium: Western King Field

1886 Southern college football independents records
	Conf.			Overall
Team	W	L	T	W		L		T
Navy		–		3	–	3	–	0
Johns Hopkins		–		2	–	2	–	1
Richmond		–		1	–	1	–	0
Randolph–Macon		–				–

The 1886 Navy Midshipmen football team represented the United States Naval Academy in the 1886 college football season. The team marked the second time that the school played a multiple-game season. The squad was captained by halfback Clarence Stone. The year began with consecutive wins over rivals St. John's College and Johns Hopkins, but then regressed with a loss to the former and a close victory over the latter. The year concluded with shutout losses to the Princeton reserve squad and Gallaudet. The season was the program's longest until 1890, when that year's team played seven games.

== Schedule ==
Date	Opponent	Site	Result	Source
November 10	St. John's (MD)	Unknown; Annapolis, MD	W 12–0	
November 13	Johns Hopkins	Unknown; Annapolis, MD (rivalry)	W 6–0	
November 20	St. John's (MD)	Unknown; Annapolis, MD	L 0-4	
November 25	Johns Hopkins	Unknown; Annapolis, MD	W 15–14	
November 27	Princeton reserve team	Unknown; Annapolis, MD	L 0-30	
December 4	Gallaudet	Unknown; Annapolis, MD	L 0-16	

== Prelude ==
According to Ellsworth P. Bertholf's biographer C. Douglas Kroll, the first evidence of a form of football at the United States Naval Academy came in 1857, but the school's cadets lost interest in the game shortly afterward. The Naval Academy fielded its first official football program in 1879, headed by William John Maxwell. The team played one match (a 0–0 tie), after which the program went on hiatus for two years. It returned with the 1882 season under the guidance of player-coach Vaulx Carter. That season and the following two years of football, were single-game seasons played against rival Johns Hopkins; Navy won two of the three years. The 1885 season was the first the school participated in a multi-game year, playing three games, including the first against nearby St. John's College. The season ended in what was generally considered a disappointment, ending in a 1–2 record.

== Season ==
The season began with a game against St. Johns, one of the first contests in what would become a heated rivalry. Navy won the game with relative ease, 12–0. The following game was against Johns Hopkins, played on November 13. The contest was an irregularity in the schools' rivalry; all previous and most following games were played on Thanksgiving Day, as a part of the Naval Academy's Thanksgiving athletic carnival. Although the score was close, a 6–0 win for the Naval Academy, Hopkins was never a threat to the cadets. After this point, the Academy's luck shifted. The squad was upset 4–0 (or 10–0) in a rematch with St. Johns, and barely defeated Johns Hopkins in a 15–14 contest, played as a part of the athletic carnival. The Baltimore American covered the Johns Hopkins game in detail:

Early in the first half, by much rushing, forcing, snap-backs and vigorous bully-ragging Riggs, the huge Hopkins quarterback, crashed over the goal line for 4 points. Paul Dashiell converted. Riggs repeated his performance but Dashiell missed conversion. Navy then adopted the Hopkins rushing tactics and Stone went over for the first score.

With Hopkins backed up against her own goal line, Dashiell broke through the entire Navy team for a touchdown. Goal was missed and the score was 14 to 6 against Navy. With the game fast coming to a close The Tars formed a closely knit ball with the halfback in center.

Navy hit pay-dirt but the referee found something illegal and called the ball back, much to the consternation of the Cadet rooters. But on the next play, George Hayward kicked a field goal, making the score 14 to 11. Just before the game ended, a double pass, Bill Cloke to captain Clarence Stone, carried to ball over the Hopkins goal for the 4 points that won the game.

Just two days after the second Hopkins game, on November 27, the Naval Academy challenged the Princeton Tigers reserve squad and was easily shutout, 30–0. The Academy never came close to scoring on the reserves. The Naval Academy hosted Gallaudet in its final game of the season sometime in December, a contest that the visitors won in a shutout, 16–0.

== Players ==
The 1886 Navy football team was made up of twelve players at five unique positions. The squad consisted of five rushers, one snap-back, two fullbacks, two halfbacks, and two quarterbacks. Three of the players (both halfbacks and a rusher) had played the previous season. The age of the players ranged several years due to the academy's admission policy; the school allowed for men between the ages of 14 and 18 to be admitted, which future player John B. Patton remarked made it "just a boys' school".

Rushers

- Carlo Brittain
- George Hayward
- John Patton
- Bill Rowan
- Elliott Snow

Snapback

- George Fermier
- James Alexander

Halfbacks

- Bill Cloke
- Clarence Stone (capt.)

Full-backs

- Henry Allen
- Lou Anderson

Quarterbacks

- Creighton Churchill
- William Williams

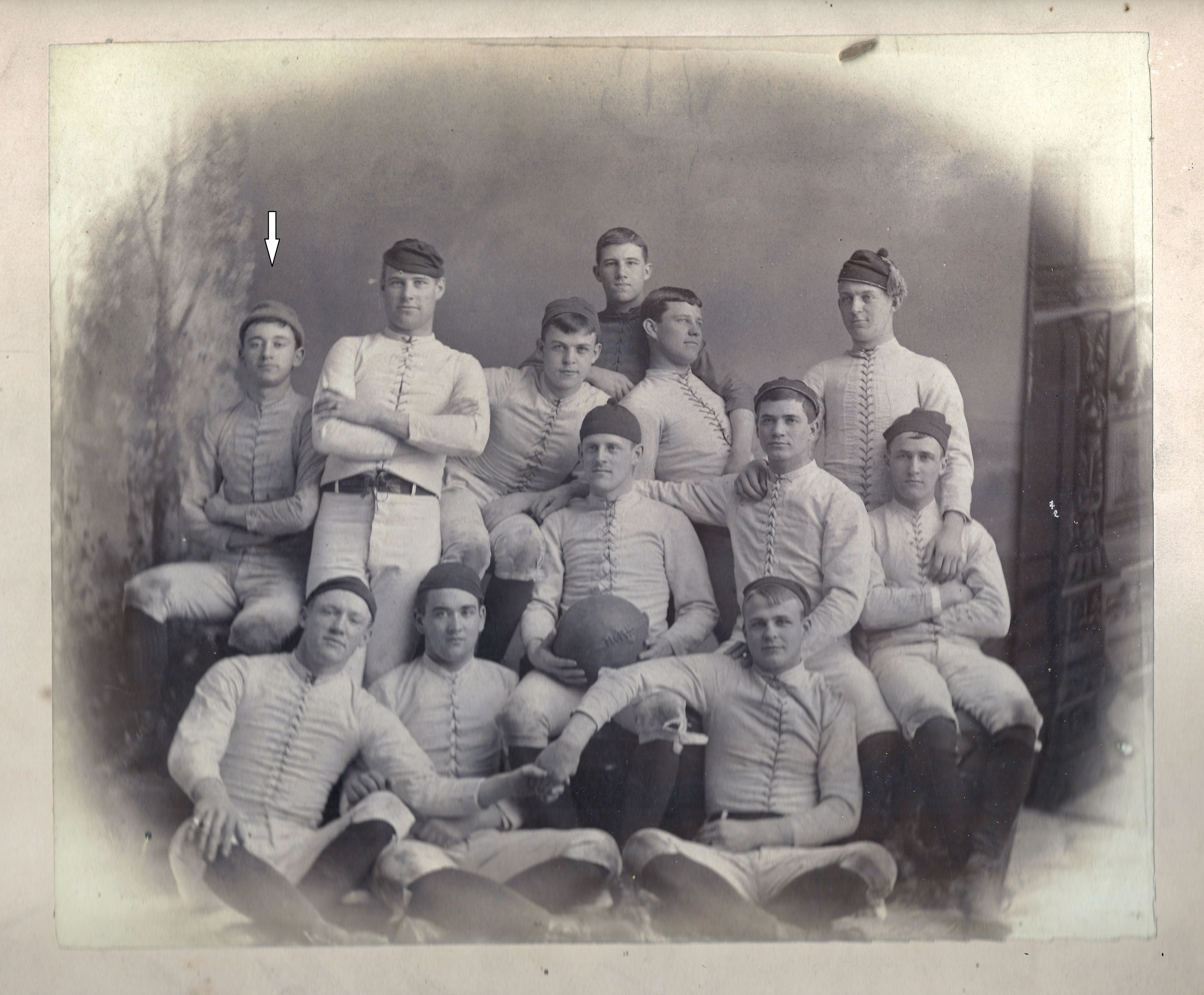
1886 Navy Midshipmen Football Team

== Postseason and aftermath ==
The first postseason college football game would not be played until 1902, with the Pasadena Tournament of Roses' establishment of the Tournament East-West football game, later known as the Rose Bowl. The Midshipmen would not participate in their first Rose Bowl until the 1923 season, when they went 5–1–2 and tied with the Washington Huskies 14–14 in the match. As a result of the lack of competition, there were no postseason games played after the 1886 season. According to statistics compiled by Billingsly, Houlgate, the National Championship Foundation, Parke H. Davis, and the Helms Athletic Foundation, Princeton and Yale were declared the 1886 season national co-champions.

Paul Dashiell, the Johns Hopkins player who nearly single-handedly beat the Naval Academy, later served as the team's head coach, leading the program to a 25–5–4 record between 1904 and 1906. The 1886 season kept Navy's overall win–loss record at an even 6–6–1. It also brought the Academy's record against Johns Hopkins to a 4–2 lead, from which Hopkins never recovered. The season marked the first time a team for the Naval Academy would play a multiple-game season. The 1886 schedule was the longest for the Naval Academy until 1891, when that year's squad played seven matches. Navy finished the 1880s with four winning seasons, and an overall record of 14–12–2. The school outscored their opponents 292–231, and would go on to finish the 19th century with an overall record of 54–19–3.
