= David H. Mason =

American politician

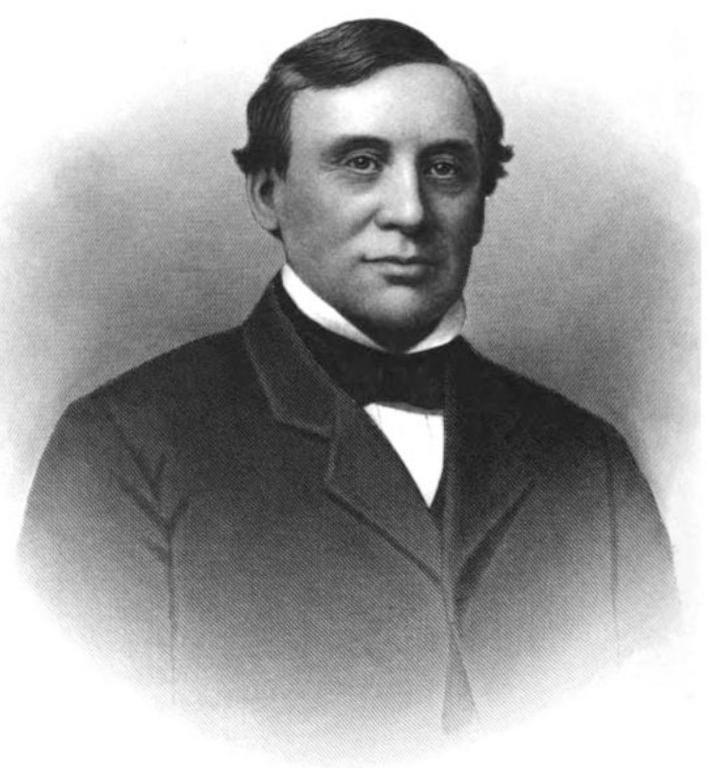

United States Attorney for the District of Massachusetts
- In office 1870–1873
- Preceded by: George Stillman Hillard
- Succeeded by: George P. Sanger

Member for the Newton district of the Massachusetts House of Representatives
- In office 1866 - 1867
- In office 1863

Personal details
- Born: March 17, 1818 Sullivan, New Hampshire
- Died: May 29, 1873 (aged 55) Newton, Massachusetts
- Party: Republican
- Spouse: Sarah Wilson White (m. 1845)
- Education: Dartmouth College; Harvard Law School
- Occupation: Lawyer

David Haven Mason (March 17, 1818 – May 29, 1873) was an American attorney and Republican politician from Newton, Massachusetts, who served on the Massachusetts Board of Education, in the Massachusetts House of Representatives, and later as the United States Attorney for the District of Massachusetts from 1870 until his death in 1873.

== Early life ==
Mason was born on March 17, 1818, in Sullivan, New Hampshire, to John and Mary (Haven) Mason. He graduated from Dartmouth College in 1841 and studied at law in Lancaster, New Hampshire, Boston, Massachusetts, and Harvard Law School.

== Legal career ==
Mason was admitted to the Suffolk County bar in 1843 and began practicing in Boston. Lacking family or personal wealth, Mason was left with only twenty-five cents after securing his office and purchasing office furniture and law books. He was eventually able to establish a successful practice.

In 1848 he moved from Boston to Newton, Massachusetts, where he lived for the rest of his life.

In 1860 Mason was appointed to the Massachusetts Board of Education. As a member of the board, Mason was influential in the establishment of the State Normal School at Framingham.

Mason represented Newton in the Massachusetts House of Representatives in 1863, 1866 and 1867. In the House he was a leading proponent of the leveling of Boston's Fort Hill, the merger of the Western Railroad and the Boston and Worcester Railroad, and the adoption of the Fourteenth Amendment to the United States Constitution.

From 1864 to 1870 Mason was a member of the Harvard Board of Overseers. On December 22, 1870, he was appointed United States Attorney for the District of Massachusetts by President Ulysses S. Grant.

Mason died on May 29, 1873, at his home in Newton. The town of Newton named one of its grammar schools in his honor (now known as Mason-Rice Elementary School).

== Personal life ==
Mason married Sarah Wilson White on June 16, 1845. They had five children:

- Edward Haven Mason (1849–1917), an attorney and philatelist
- Elizabeth Amelia White Mason (1853–1864)
- Harry White Mason (1857–1929), an attorney
- Frank A. Mason (1862–1940), an attorney and the first full-time football coach at Harvard University.
- Mabel White (Mason) Mowton (1867–1931)

He was a distant relative of Rufus Osgood Mason, who also grew up in Sullivan, New Hampshire.
