= Edward Haven Mason =

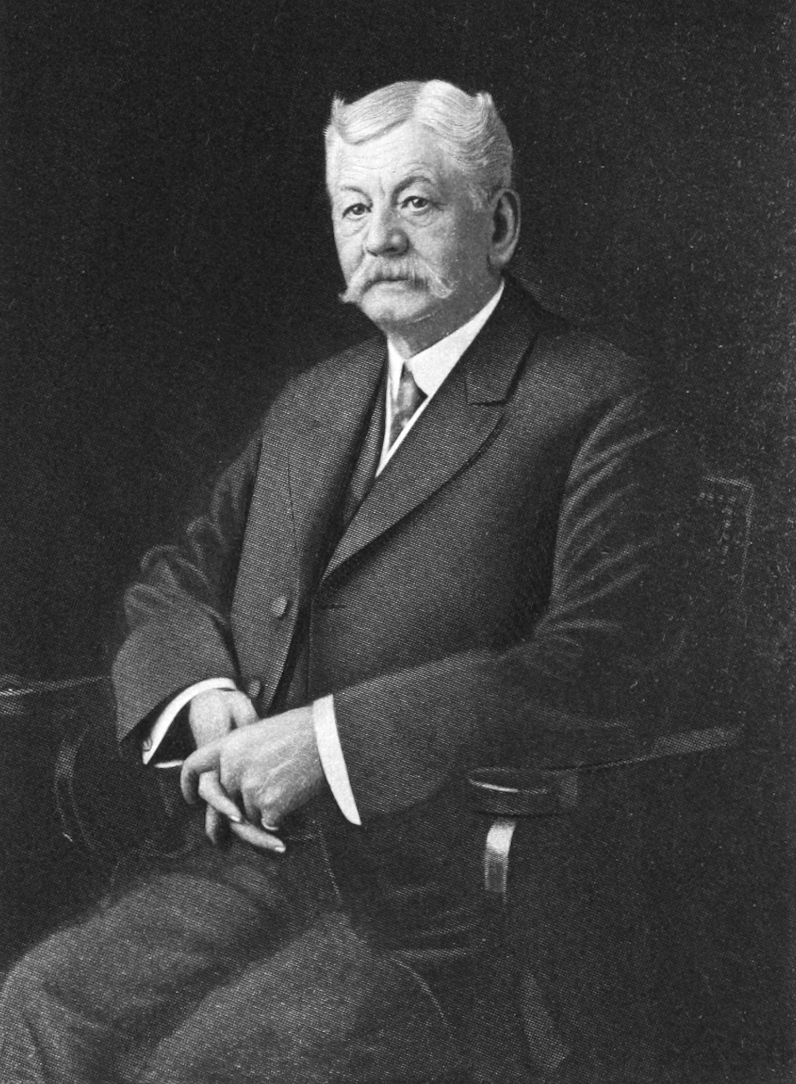
- Born: June 8, 1849; Newton, Massachusetts
- Died: March 21, 1917 (aged 67); Boston, Massachusetts
- Spouse: Lelia Sylvina Nickerson (m. 1877)
- Engineering career
- Projects: Studied proofs and essays of United States postage stamps, and wrote books on the subject
- Awards: APS Hall of Fame

Edward Haven Mason (June 8, 1849 – March 21, 1917), of Boston, Massachusetts, was the first philatelist to study, and to write on, proofs and essays of United States postage stamps and postal stationery.

== Collecting interests ==
Mason specialized in collecting and studying proofs and essays related to United States postal history and wrote extensively on the subject. His books include: Essays for United States Postage Stamps, published in 1911; The Proofs and Essays for the U.S. Envelopes, also in 1911, and More Essays for United States Postage Stamps, in 1912.

Mason's listings of proofs and essays were the basis for their listing in Scott U.S. Specialized Catalogue of Stamps.

== Publication restraints ==
At the time Mason performed his studies and wrote, it was illegal in the United States to publish illustrations of United States postage stamp material. As a result, his works have no illustrations.

== Honors and awards ==
Edward Mason was named to the American Philatelic Society Hall of Fame in 1949.

== Legacy ==
Only ten copies of Mason's books, with photographs interleaved by the New England Stamp Company, were especially printed. Copies of these interleaved books are located at the Collectors Club of New York and at the Smithsonian Institution, in the library of the National Postal Museum.

== Personal life ==
Mason was born in Newton, Massachusetts on June 8, 1849, the son of United States Attorney David H. Mason and the brother of attorney and football coach Frank A. Mason.

He married Lelia Sylvina Nickerson on February 1, 1877, and they had three children.

He died at his home in Boston on March 21, 1917.

== See also ==
- Philately
- Philatelic literature
