= William A. Brooks =

American surgeon (1864–1921)

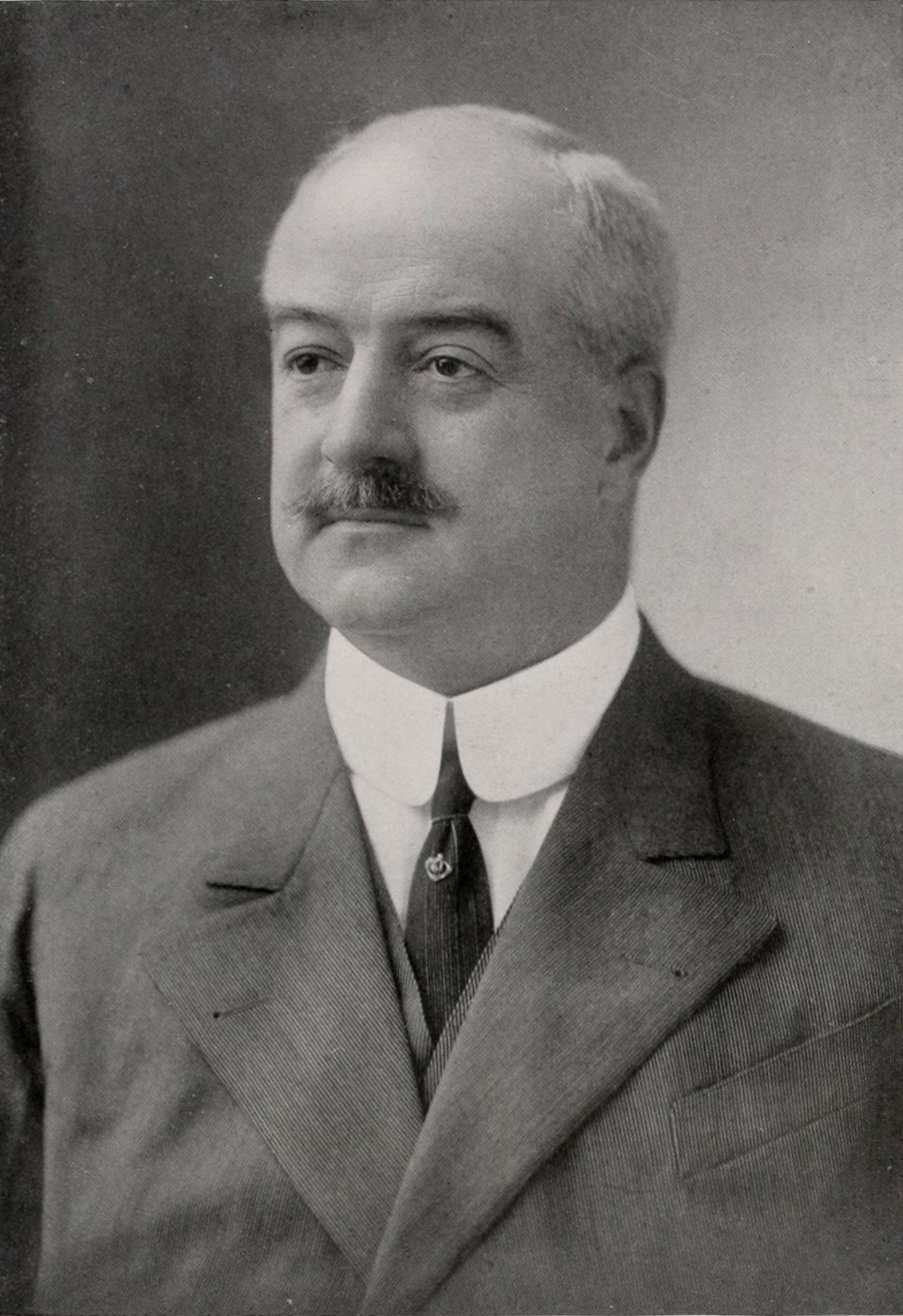

Biographical details
- Born: August 15, 1864; Haverhill, Massachusetts, U.S.
- Died: May 20, 1921 (aged 56); Brookline, Massachusetts, U.S.

Playing career

Football
- 1883–1886: Harvard

Rowing
- 1883–1886: Harvard
- Position: Center (football)

Coaching career (HC unless noted)

Football
- 1894: Harvard

Head coaching record
- Overall: 11–2

William Allen Brooks Jr. (August 15, 1864 – May 20, 1921) was an American surgeon, college football player, coach, referee, and rower. He played football and participated in rowing at Harvard and afterwards was a prominent surgeon as well as official, additionally serving one year as the Harvard football coach.

A native of Haverhill, Massachusetts, Brooks graduated from Phillips Exeter Academy. He afterwards attended Harvard College from 1883 to 1886, playing football and being a member of their rowing team. He was team captain in football as a senior, and led them to a 12–2 record. Following his graduation from the college, Brooks enrolled at the Harvard Medical School, at which he received a Doctor of Medicine in 1891. In the next years, he received positions at several hospitals as a surgeon and became a faculty member of Harvard. During this time, he was also a highly-respected sports official and served one season as Harvard's head football coach, compiling an 11–2 record.

By the early 1900s, Brooks had become one of the most prominent surgeons in the area, serving for a time as the surgeon-in-chief at St. Elizabeth's Hospital and establishing his own hospital for appendicitis in 1912. Around that time, he also became a faculty member of the Tufts University School of Medicine and made several medical inventions. Brooks had built in 1915 a hospital bearing his name in Brookline, Massachusetts. During World War I, he served as the chief surgeon Massachusetts State Guard, the acting surgeon general of the state, and a medical director for the United States Shipping Board. He served as an important figure in the relief efforts of the Halifax Explosion in 1917.

When the Spanish flu pandemic began in 1918, Brooks devoted much time towards combating the virus and had established an emergency tent hospital in Brookline. His research showed that sunshine and fresh air were the best treatments for the disease, and his tent hospital had significantly lower death rates than most others, despite taking in most of the worst cases. He later had another hospital built the following year, making a permanent facility to apply the same treatment as the tent hospital. Brooks continued his practice until his death from heart failure in May 1921.

== Early life and education ==
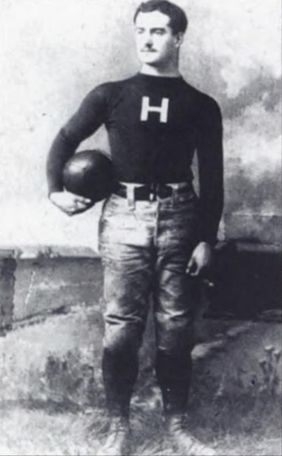
Brooks in football uniform

Brooks was born on August 15, 1864, in Haverhill, Massachusetts. He began attending Phillips Exeter Academy at age 15 in 1880, and graduated in 1883. He played football there and was team captain in 1886. He also participated in rowing and was mentioned in The Phillips Exeter Academy: A History as one of the players in the declining era of school boating who went on to "shine as college oarsmen."

After graduating from Phillips Exeter, Brooks enrolled at Harvard College in 1883. "Gifted by nature for any sort of heavy work," he played football and rowing and served as "an immense help to both," according to the magazine Outing. He played on the freshman football team in 1883 before moving to the varsity team. His position was center.

Brooks became a very prominent Harvard student for his accomplishments in football and rowing, with one source writing that he "was one of the best known Harvard men of his time." He was elected second marshal at the school, which was the equivalent of vice class president. He was also active in several undergraduate matters.

In 1886, Brooks became the captain of the Harvard football team. He "set to work in dead earnest" in the fall, and helped develop a team that "did wonders" and "was the first in years to do real credit to Harvard." They went 12–2, were unscored upon with the exception of the games against Princeton and Yale, and included among their wins was a 158–0 defeat of Phillips Exeter Academy, Brooks' former school, which was the largest win in football history by that point. They also defeated Wesleyan in a championship game by a score of 110–0, and had eight additional matches where they won by over 40 points.

Brooks received much praise for his 1886 Harvard team, and was credited with "starting the ball a-rolling" at the school, according to Outing. They lost only two games, to Yale and Princeton, both considered national champions of the season. This Harvard team was said to have done the work of "raising Harvard's football and placing it among the best." Brooks was a member of the graduating class of 1887.

Brooks was a member of the Delta Kappa Epsilon fraternity. He was also a member of the Harvard Hasty Pudding Club, Union, University, Athletic and Country Clubs, and was a founder and director of the "Varsity Club." He later was an officer for the Beta Theta Pi fraternity, serving as its president for a time.

== Later athletic career ==
=== Officiating ===
Brooks was highly regarded as an official for his knowledge of the game, with requests being made for him to referee an important Princeton–Yale match just days after his own final game in 1886. An article from 1892 wrote that Brooks "is to-day a favorite referee for all football matches–his firmness, knowledge of the game and honesty of purpose being proverbial."

Brooks was the head official for the Princeton–Yale game in 1887, 1888, 1889, 1890, 1891, 1892, and 1893. He refused to officiate Yale games after what was considered dirty play in their 1894 match against Harvard. He also refereed several of his alma mater's games, including at least three in 1894 when he also served as their head coach. Other schools he officiated games for included Michigan, Andover, Penn, Cornell, MIT, Brown, Amherst, Williams, and Dartmouth, among others. Brooks additionally served as referee for several rowing matches.

=== Involvement at Harvard ===
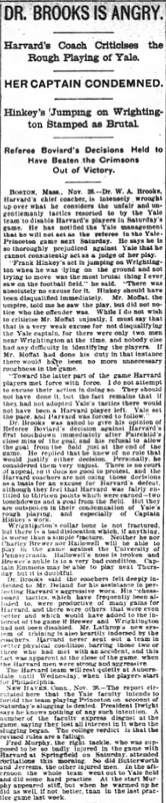
News report about Brooks' disgust after the Harvard–Yale match

Brooks was active in Harvard sports for years after his graduation. He occasionally served as the football team's trainer, was for a time their medical advisor, and was a member of several of Harvard's athletic boards, in addition to helping train the rowing team. He also served until at least 1906 as the physician for several of Harvard's teams. At the start of 1894, Brooks was appointed to serve on the college football rules committee, with a goal of improving how the sport was played (due to several accidents and severe injuries that occurred in 1893), along with Walter Camp (Yale), John C. Bell (Penn), and Alexander Moffat (Princeton), later being joined by P. J. Dashiell (Lehigh). The following is a report from The Philadelphia Times detailing the results of their meetings:

The year was an eventful one for foot-ball. During the winter a committee consisting of Dr. W. A. Brooks, Harvard; Walter Camp, Yale; Alexander Moffat, Princeton; Paul J. Dashiell, Lehigh; and John C. Bell, Pennsylvania, met in New York and drafted a revision of the rules, which, it was supposed, would do away with the dangerous features of the game and also prevent brutality. Flying wedges and mass plays were abolished; opening plays were limited to an actual kick of ten yards into the opponent's territory; the full-back was protected by being allowed to signal for a free catch, and tries for goal from the field were encouraged; the flying interference of 1893 was legislated against, a new rule providing that not more than three men should start before the ball was put into play. It was soon predicted, however, that little change would be effected in the manner of playing the game.

Brooks was also named Harvard's football head coach in 1894, a position in which he served for one season. The Brooks-led Crimson started the season by shutting out Dartmouth (22–0), Phillips Exeter (48–0), and Andover (46–0), followed by an 18–4 victory against Brown, which was considered a "big surprise" as they were expected to continue their shutout streak. Harvard then shutout the Orange Athletic Club (14–0), Amherst (30–0), and Williams (32–0), before allowing 12 points in their 22–12 victory over Cornell. Afterwards, they played the Boston Athletic Association, winning 40–0, the Chicago Athletic Association, winning 36–0, and re-matched Brown, whom they defeated 18–0.

==== Game against Yale ====
Brooks' team by this point in the season was 11–0, having shutout all but two opponents. The next game on their schedule was an all-important match against the undefeated Yale Bulldogs, their biggest rival. The match was played before 25,000 fans in Springfield, Massachusetts, and despite the recent rule changes to make football safer, proved to be one of the most violent games in the history of the sport. Various newspaper reports described the violence in detail:

"Hayes [of Harvard] gained two yards around right end, and [Frank] Hinkey [of Yale], in attempting to stop him, hit him a blow right in the face with his fist"
"It seemed to be Hinkey's main object to disable the best players of Harvard"
"In one of the quick line ups Murphy [of Yale] gave Hallowell [of Harvard] a quick smash in the eye that escaped the notice of both umpire and referee"
"Butterworth [of Yale] had grown worse and was staggering about the field weak and useless"
"In one of the fierce rushes [Murphy] was knocked senseless. It was five minutes before he got up and rubbed his head with a 'Mamma, where am I?' look on his face"
"After a wait to two minutes [Murphy] staggered to his feet, but was plainly in no condition to play football. He did not even know which was his goal, and between each two plays had to have the situation explained to him"

Yale eventually won, 12–4, but there was much debate over the violence of the game and some called for the sport to end altogether. The New York Times wrote that, "An ordinary rebellion in the South American or Central American States is as child's play compared with the destructiveness of [to]day's game." Brooks was disgusted by the state of the game and Yale's playing, and refused to referee the following week's Princeton–Yale game, declaring "No more serious blow has ever been delivered against the American game of football than the manner in which the Harvard–Yale game was played today ... I am convinced that unless representatives of both universities learn to play the game free from objectionable features, the game must stop." He admitted that his team had played violent as well, but stated that "If they had not adopted Yale's tactics there would not have been a Harvard player left." The controversy over this game, escalated by Brooks' criticisms of Yale and a published letter attacking Hinkey, led to all sports between the schools being discontinued.

Harvard finished the season with an 18–4 loss against Penn. Brooks' team ended with an overall record of 11–2, and he did not return in the position for the 1895 season. He remained active at Harvard, however, being named in 1895 graduate member of the athletic board. He was appointed in 1896 to the committee on the regulation of athletic sports, and re-appointed in 1897. Brooks eventually apologized for his criticisms of Yale and his attack letter of Hinkey, saying "That darn letter is the one thing I regret in my athletic career," and made peace with the school and their coach, Walter Camp. He and Camp signed an agreement in February 1897 resuming sports between Yale and Harvard.

Brooks was a strong supporter of the Harvard rowing team after graduating, with The Boston Globe describing him as "a Harvard crew supporter of the staunchest type," while writing he "has followed the ups and downs of Harvard boating from the day when he pulled in the shell that rowed away from the Yale crew in [18]85. Win or lose, the doctor has always been on hand, with his courage never failing and oftentimes scenting victory because of his deep loyalty to Harvard."

== Career as a surgeon ==
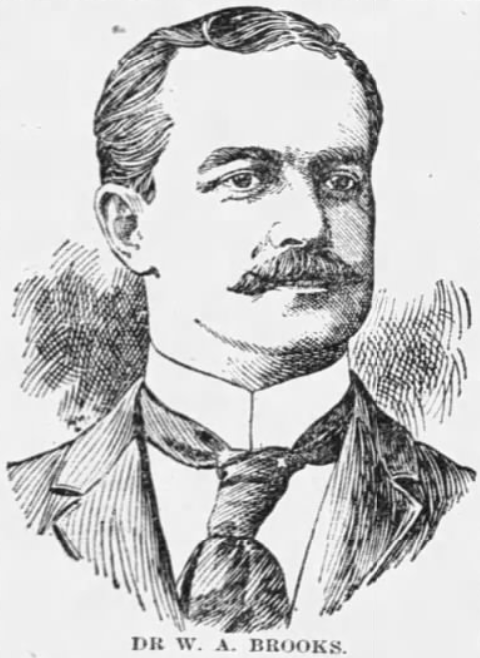
Sketch of Brooks, 1902

After graduating from Harvard College, Brooks entered the Harvard Medical School in the fall of 1887. He took the optional course for four years there, and received in June 1891 his Doctor of Medicine, as well as a Master of Arts degree. One year later, he was appointed "Assistant of Anatomy" at the school, and served in the position through June 1895. He was appointed "Demonstrator of Anatomy" that year, succeeding Dr. Dexter, and later in June 1896 was re-appointed for five more years. Brooks' appointment to "Demonstrator of Anatomy" made him a member of the faculty. By 1901, he was the school's instructor in minor surgery and by 1903, became "Assistant in Surgery."

Brooks was named "House Pupil" (the same as an intern) at the Massachusetts General Hospital in 1890. In June 1894, he was named one of their "Out Patient Surgeons," and was re-appointed to that role at least four times. He was named assistant surgeon in the light artillery in May 1895, being given the rank of first lieutenant. In the winter of 1897, Brooks was also appointed a surgeon at St. Elizabeth's Hospital. At the end of 1906, Brooks became one of the Massachusetts General Hospital's "Visiting Surgeons," being appointed to fill the vacancy left by John W. Elliot, who resigned.

By 1906, according to Munsey's Magazine, Brooks had become "one of the most prominent physicians of Boston, with a splendidly lucrative practi[c]e." In c. 1909, Brooks announced his resignation from the Massachusetts General Hospital, but continued his practice. About one year later, he became the surgeon-in-chief at St. Elizabeth's Hospital. In 1912, he was appointed assistant of the surgery department at the Tufts University School of Medicine. He also became assistant professor of clinical surgery and an instructor. Brooks additionally that year opened a hospital for appendicitis. The Medical Times described this as follows:

A distinct innovation, but one which is bound to be followed by scores of others throughout the country before long, is the new hospital for appendicitis in Boston, opened by Dr. W. A. Brooks, Jr., of the surgical faculty of Tufts Medical School. It has been felt for some time that institutions for the medical and surgical treatment of diseases of the appendix would prove advantageous and it is believed Dr. Brooks' experiment will be crowned with success.

Brooks' appendicitis hospital was at the time the one devoted exclusively to the condition in the world. At the end of 1913, he announced his resignation as surgeon-in-chief at St. Elizabeth's after having served in the position for three years. Brooks also, that year, invented what the magazine Power Wagon described as "[a] motor ambulance unlike anything that has ever been seen before." It said:

[I]nvented by Dr. William A. Brooks, one of Boston's leading surgeons[,] [i]t has the advantages of being light, handy, etc., and while it answers every purpose of a regulation ambulance. By a very clever arrangement of the back and front seat of his touring car and a slight change here and there in the interior it can be converted into an ambulance in very few minutes and with practically no trouble.
In the car which the doctor now has, the back of the front seat has been cut through all the way from the top to the bottom and cushioned separately. This tilts back, allowing a continuous rest from the front of the front seat to the back of the rear seat, the drop just filling in the space between the two. The back, when down, rests on a steel bar, which, when not in use, may be pushed under the rear seat, out of sight. Ahead of the front seat and on the same level with it is the head rest. When not in use this folds under the cushion of the front seat. The whole, when ready for the patient, makes as complete a cushioned bed or stretcher as could possibly be desired. When not being used as an ambulance, and when everything is set back into its concealed location, the interior of the car looks exactly like that of any other car of the same make, and except for two setscrews, which hold the back of the front seat into position, no one would ever imagine that the car could in a very few minutes be converted into as comfortable an ambulance as possible, thus avoiding the waits sometimes necessary after putting in a call for one.
The arrangements are such that the patient travels head first while the body space is ample for the average person, this, however, depending on the size of the car used. The scheme is one that was thought out and put to test by Dr. Brooks, and those who have seen it, especially the doctors, have been very enthusiastic over it. Its advantages are almost unlimited and some of the leading physicians who have seen the car claim similar cars will be much in demand and that Dr. Brooks has introduced a car that will be of tremendous benefit to the medical world and the public alike.

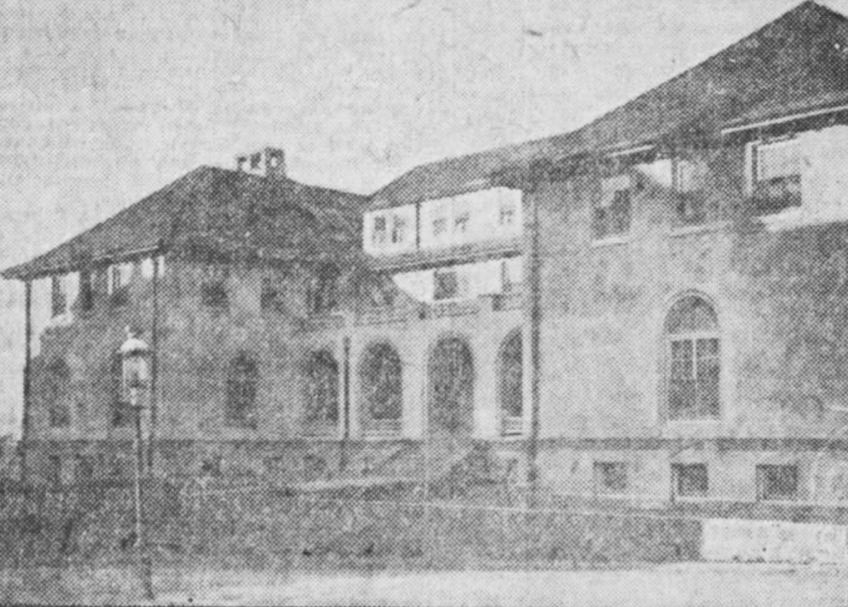
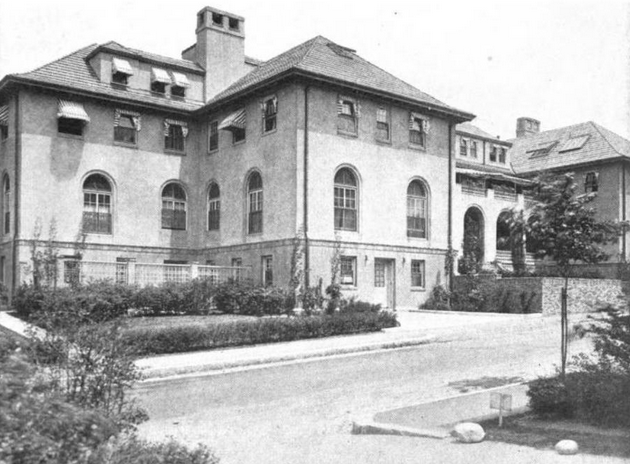
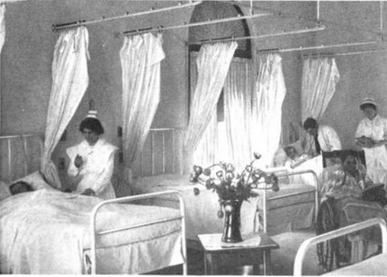
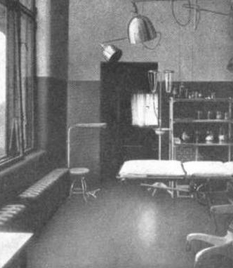
The top two images show Brooks Hospital from different angles. The bottom left image is of one of its rooms for patients, while the bottom right is the hospital's operating room.

In 1915, he had built in Brookline, Massachusetts, on Corey Hill at 227 Summit Avenue, the Brooks Hospital. According to the Guide to Boston for Physicians, it had accommodations for up to 34 patients, and the majority of cases were surgical. Two wards of eight beds each were devoted to industrial accident cases for the Liberty Mutual Insurance Company, and the second floor consisted of private rooms, while the Sias Laboratories were also headquartered there. The Boston Globe described the hospital as follows:

Boston has many hospitals, but there is always room at the top, and that is just where room has been found for the Brooks Hospital and Sias Laboratory–on top of Corey Hill, overlooking the entire city of Boston and the town of Brookline ...
And it doesn't take very much of study of this new hospital, in its splendid location, its appropriate architecture, its interior arrangements and equipment, to show that in another and more complete sense it is entitled to a place at the top ...
In the first place, it is the realized ideal of what a hospital should be–the ideal of one of Boston's foremost surgeons, Dr William Allen Brooks–and it is based in every detail of its architecture and of its splendid equipment on his 20 years of active hospital and private practice, and on a broad, international study and observation of hospitals, of hospital work and necessities, and of hospital conditions.

In May 1917, as the United States was preparing for World War I, Brooks, at the time head of the hospital bearing his name, was appointed chief surgeon of the Massachusetts State Guard. He was given the rank of lieutenant colonel by governor Samuel W. McCall. While in the position, to help transport the wounded in the war, Brooks invented a form of the stretcher with wheels attached. Later becoming the acting surgeon general of the commonwealth, Brooks organized the first medical unit that was dispatched to Halifax, Nova Scotia, after the Halifax Explosion in December 1917.

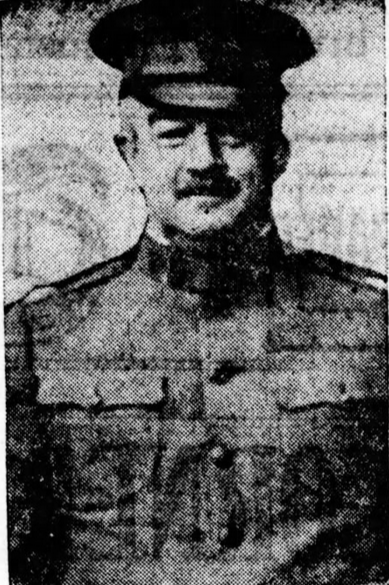
Brooks pictured in the Boston Post

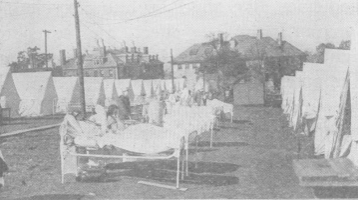
Camp Brooks Open Air Hospital

In 1918, Brooks sent letters urging for more hospital facilities, with the Spanish flu pandemic and injuries from the war placing a strain on the services. As the pandemic worsened, he began devoting all his time to supervision of hospitals and studying the disease. By September, Brooks, who had also been named a medical director for the United States Shipping Board, had established at Corey Hill an emergency tent hospital, believing through his studies that sunshine and fresh air were the most effective at combating the virus. The Camp Brooks Open Air Hospital, as it was known, consisted of 13 tents, all but one of which were occupied by 1–2 patients and the other by the head nurse. The hospital took 351 patients from the 1,200 sick among the merchant sailors in the East Boston harbor, receiving many of the worst cases. A later article from the American Journal of Public Health described its conditions:

The treatment at Camp Brooks Hospital took place outdoors, with "a maximum of sunshine and of fresh air day and night." The medical officer in charge, Major Thomas F. Harrington, had studied the history of his patients and found that the worst cases of pneumonia came from the parts of ships that were most badly ventilated. In good weather, patients were taken out of their tents and put in the open. They were kept warm in their beds at night with hot-water bottles and extra blankets and were fed every few hours throughout the course of the fever. Anyone in contact with them had to wear an improvised facemask, which comprised five layers of gauze on a wire frame covering the nose and mouth. The frame was made out of an ordinary gravy strainer, shaped to fit the face of the wearer and to prevent the gauze filter from touching the nostrils or mouth. Nurses and orderlies were instructed to keep their hands away from the outside of the masks as much as possible. A superintendent made sure the masks were replaced every two hours, were properly sterilized, and contained fresh gauze. Other measures to prevent infection included the wearing of gloves and gowns, including a head covering. Doctors, nurses, and orderlies had to wash their hands in disinfectant after contact with patients and before eating. The use of common drinking cups, towels, and other items was strictly forbidden. Patients' dishes and utensils were kept separate and put in boiling water after each use. Pneumonia and meningitis patients used paper plates, drinking cups, and napkins; paper bags with gauze were pinned to pillowcases for sputum. Extensive use was made of mouthwash and gargle, and twice daily, the proprietary silver-based antimicrobial ointment Argyrol was applied to nasal mucous membranes to prevent ear infection.

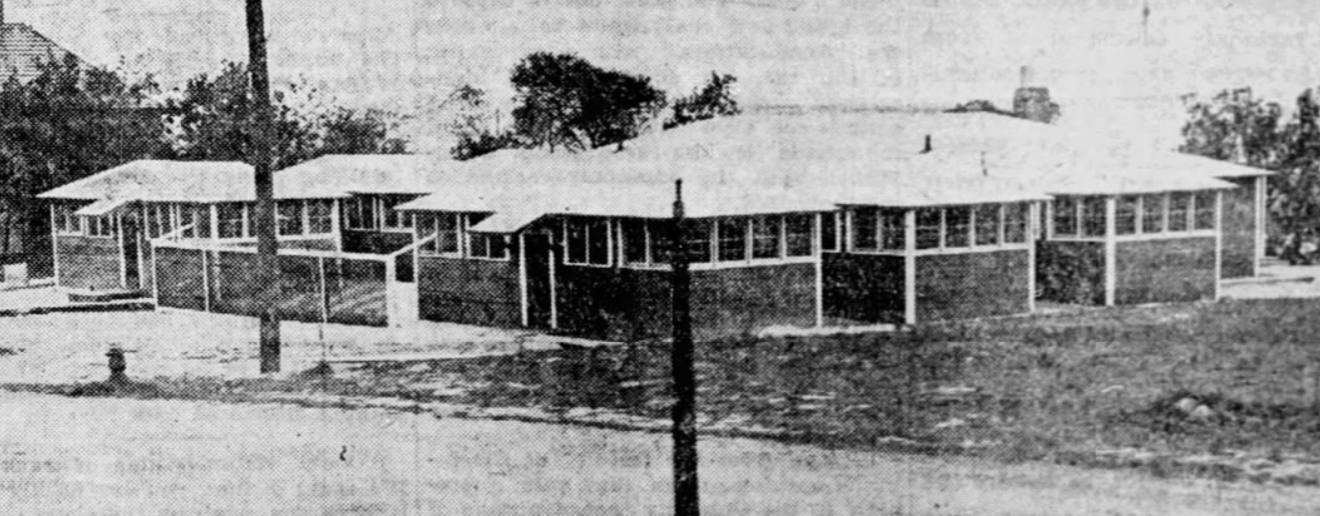
Brooks Cubicle Hospital

After a month in operation, the hospital was taken down after the pandemic had been put under control. Of the 351 patients it received, only 36 died, which was a much lower rate than most hospitals, even though Camp Brooks had taken in some of the worst cases. Additionally, among the 150 doctors and nurses, only eight contracted influenza, and five of those were thought to have caught it from outside the camp. In October, after the camp closed, Brooks published an article in the American Journal of Public Health discussing "The Open Air Treatment Of Influenza." One year later, he established nearby the "Brooks Cubicle Hospital," for a more permanent facility to apply the same type of treatment. He continued practicing until his death in 1921.

In his career as a surgeon, Brooks specialized in abdominal surgery, although he was also an "acknowledged authority on general surgical practice." One magazine described him as being among "the best known American practitioners."

== Personal life and death ==
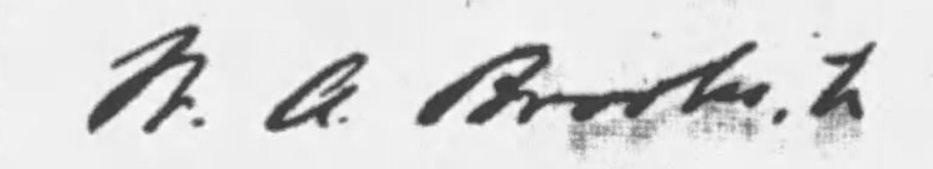
Brooks' signature

Brooks was a member of the Sons of the American Revolution, having been a descendant of Robert Brooks who served in the war. He was the medical director for the Massachusetts Employees Insurance Association and was an officer for the Massachusetts Medical Benevolent Society. Brooks was also a member of the Medical Sciences Association, American Medical Association, American Anatomists, and Medical Improvement Society. In July 1894, he wrote an article for the magazine Harper's Monthly about "The Picturesque Side Of The Yale–Harvard Race."

Brooks married Helen M. Winchell, of New Haven, Connecticut, on November 9, 1892. They had a daughter, Katharine, born March 10, 1895, who died January 11, 1896. Brooks' wife died in October 1919, after having been in poor health for "some time."

Brooks died of heart failure on May 20, 1921, at his private hospital in Brookline, Massachusetts.

== Head coaching record ==
Year	Team	Overall	Conference	Standing	Bowl/playoffs
Harvard Crimson (Independent) (1894)
1894	Harvard	11–2			
Harvard:		11–2			
Total:		11–2			

== Works ==
- "The Harvard and Yale boat-race. Observations of a Harvard man". Harper's Monthly. July 1894.
- A General Consideration of Athletics; their Value in the Training of Soldiers. 1896.
- (with Walton, George L.) "Observations on Brain Surgery suggested by a Case of multiple Cerebral Hemorrhage". Boston Medical and Surgical Journal. 136 (13): 301. 1897. doi:10.1056/NEJM189704011361302.
- "Will The Automobile Survive? Has It Come To Stay?: How To Get Along Without It?". The Boston Globe. August 21, 1904. p. 32 – via Newspapers.com.
- "First of a Series of Articles on the Appendix Vermiformis". Boston Medical and Surgical Journal. September 28, 1905.
- The workmen's compensation act and its relation to physicians. 1912.
- General Remarks on Surgery, with Special Reference to Industrial Problems. 1915.
- "The Open Air Treatment Of Influenza". American Journal of Public Health. 8 (10): 746–750. October 1918. doi:10.2105/AJPH.8.10.746. PMC 1362338. PMID 18009962.
- "The Origin of Camp Brooks and the Open-Air Treatment of Influenza". Journal of the Boston Society of Civil Engineers. 5 (10). Boston Society of Civil Engineers (published December 1918): 423–430. 1918 [November 1918].
