= 1886 college football season =

American college football season

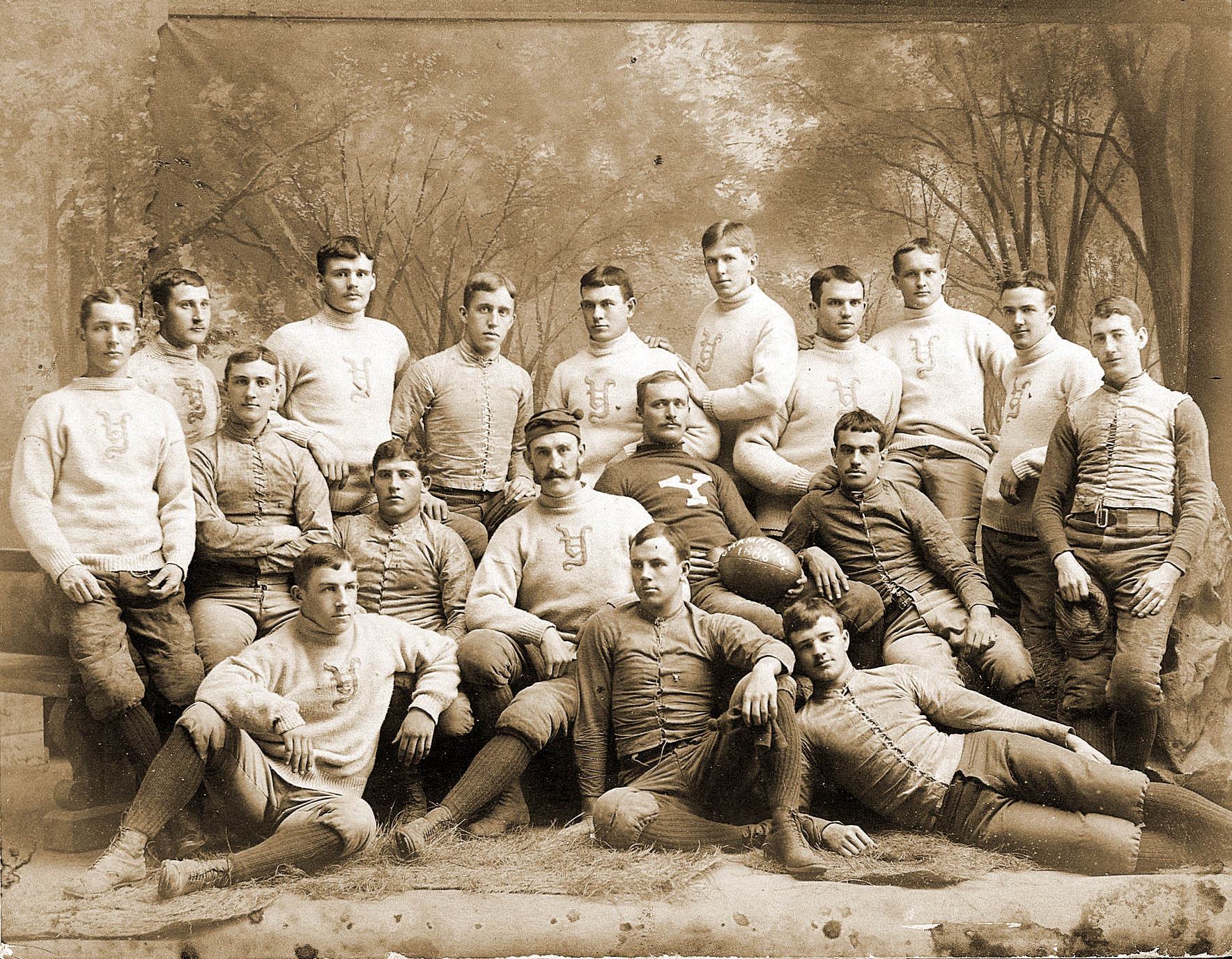
- 1886 Yale Bulldogs
- Total No. of teams: 14
- Regular season: September 29 to November 25
- Champion(s): Princeton; Yale

The 1886 college football season had no clear-cut champion, with the Official NCAA Division I Football Records Book listing Princeton and Yale as having been selected national champions.

== Conference and program changes ==
School	1885 Conference	1886 Conference
California Golden Bears	Program established	Independent

== Season notes ==
On Thanksgiving Day in Princeton, NJ, undefeated teams from Yale and Princeton met. The game started late due to the absence of a referee, and heavy rain caused the game to be called on account of darkness with Yale leading 4–0 in the second half. Under the rules of the time, the game was declared "no contest" by the substitute referee, and the final score was declared to be 0–0. After a special meeting of the Intercollegiate Football Association held to review the game, the Association issued a two-part resolution - that (1) Yale should have been acknowledged the winner, but that (2) under their existing rules, the Association did not have the authority to award the game to them.

The first intercollegiate game in the state of Vermont happened on November 6, 1886, between Dartmouth and Vermont at Burlington, Vermont. Dartmouth won 91 to 0. Vermont was the last state in New England yet to have a football contest.

== Conference standings ==
The following is a potentially incomplete list of conference standings:

1886 Northern Intercollegiate Football Association standings
	Conf.			Overall
Team	W	L	T	W		L		T
Williams $		–		5	–	1	–	1
Tufts		–		0	–	8	–	0
$ – Conference champion

=== Independents ===
1886 Eastern college football independents records
	Conf.			Overall
Team	W	L	T	W		L		T
Yale		–		9	–	0	–	1
Princeton		–		7	–	0	–	1
Harvard		–		12	–	2	–	0
Lafayette		–		10	–	2	–	0
Williams		–		5	–	1	–	1
Massachusetts		–		2	–	1	–	0
Penn		–		9	–	7	–	1
Lehigh		–		4	–	3	–	1
Dartmouth		–		2	–	2	–	0
Amherst		–		3	–	4	–	0
Rutgers		–		1	–	3	–	0
Wesleyan		–		2	–	6	–	0
MIT		–		2	–	6	–	1
Vermont		–		0	–	1	–	0
Stevens		–		0	–	7	–	1
Tufts		–		0	–	8	–	0
NYU		–		0	–	3	–	0
Swarthmore		–				–
Trinity (CT)		–				–

1886 Midwestern college football independents records
	Conf.			Overall
Team	W	L	T	W		L		T
Cincinnati		–		2	–	0	–	0
Michigan		–		2	–	0	–	0
Wabash		–		2	–	0	–	1
Albion		–		1	–	2	–	0
Northwestern		–		0	–	1	–	0
Minnesota		–		0	–	2	–	0

1886 Southern college football independents records
	Conf.			Overall
Team	W	L	T	W		L		T
Navy		–		3	–	3	–	0
Johns Hopkins		–		2	–	2	–	1
Richmond		–		1	–	1	–	0
Randolph–Macon		–				–

1886 Western college football independents records
	Conf.			Overall
Team	W	L	T	W		L		T
California		–		6	–	2	–	1
Colorado College		–		1	–	0	–	0
