= 1886 Tufts Jumbos football team =

American college football season

1886 Tufts Jumbos football
- Conference: Northern Intercollegiate Football Association
- Record: 0–9 (0–5 Northern)
- Head coach: James Galletly (1st season)
- Captain: James Galletly
- Home stadium: College Hill

1886 Northern Intercollegiate Football Association standings
	Conf.					Overall
Team	W		L		T	W		L		T
Williams $	4	–	1	–	1	5	–	2	–	1
Amherst	4	–	2	–	0	7	–	3	–	0
Boston Tech	2	–	2	–	1	2	–	7	–	1
Tufts	0	–	5	–	0	0	–	9	–	0
$ – Conference champion

The 1886 Tufts Jumbos football team represented the Amherst College as a member of the Northern Intercollegiate Football Association during the 1886 college football season. The by James Galletly in his first and only season as head coach, the Jumbos compiled an overall record of 0–9 with a mark of 0–5 in conference play, placing last out of four teams in the Northern league.

== Schedule ==
Date	Time	Opponent	Site	Result	Attendance	Source
October 6		at Harvard*	Cambridge, MA	L 0–82		
October 13	4:05 p.m.	at Harvard*	Jarvis Field; Cambridge, MA	L 0–46		
October 20	2:24 p.m.	Williams	College Hill; Medford, MA	L 0–61		
October 23	3:15 p.m.	Harvard consolidated*	College Hill; Medford, MA	L 0–10	250	
November 3	3:02 p.m.	Amherst	Medford, MA	L 4–18		
November 6		at Williams	Weston Field; Williamstown, MA	L 4–33		
November 8		at Massachusetts*	Blake Field; Amherst, MA	L 5–6		
November 9	12:45 p.m.	at Amherst	Amherst, MA	L 12–22		
November 19	2:33 p.m.	Boston Tech	College Hill; Medford, MA	L 8–26	300	
*Non-conference game
