= 1886 Boston Tech football team =

American college football season

1886 Boston Tech football
- Conference: Northern Intercollegiate Football Association
- Record: 2–7–1 (2–2–1 Northern)
- Head coach: None
- Home stadium: Union Grounds

1886 Northern Intercollegiate Football Association standings
	Conf.					Overall
Team	W		L		T	W		L		T
Williams $	4	–	1	–	1	5	–	2	–	1
Amherst	4	–	2	–	0	7	–	3	–	0
Boston Tech	2	–	2	–	1	2	–	7	–	1
Tufts	0	–	5	–	0	0	–	9	–	0
$ – Conference champion

The 1886 Boston Tech football team represented Boston Tech—now known as the Massachusetts Institute of Technology (MIT)—as a member of the Northern Intercollegiate Football Association during the 1886 college football season. The team compiled an overall record of 2–7–1 with a mark of 2–2–1 in conference play, placing third in the Northern league. Boston Tech played home games at Union Grounds in Boston.

== Schedule ==
Date	Time	Opponent	Site	Result	Attendance	Source
October 9		Harvard*	Union Grounds; Boston, MA	L 0–54		
October 16		at Yale*	Yale Field; New Haven, CT	L 0–96		
October 20	4:05 p.m.	at Harvard*	Jarvis Field; Cambridge, MA	L 0–59		
October 23	3:05 p.m.	at Amherst	Amherst, MA	L 0–18		
October 29	3:00 p.m.	at Dartmouth*	Union Grounds; Boston, MA	L 6–11		
November 3	2:32 p.m.	Williams	Union Grounds; Boston, MA	T 14–14		
November 5	2:30 p.m.	Amherst	Union Grounds; Boston, MA	W 22–0		
November 13	1:45 p.m.	at Williams	Weston Field; Williamstown, MA	L 0–21	200	
November 17	2:55 p.m.	Harvard*	Union Grounds; Boston, MA	L 0–62		
November 19	2:33 p.m.	at Tufts	College Hill; Medford, MA	W 26–8	300	
*Non-conference game
