= 1886 Amherst football team =

American college football season

1886 Amherst football
- Conference: Northern Intercollegiate Football Association
- Record: 7–3 (4–2 Northern)
- Head coach: None
- Home stadium: Blake Field

1886 Northern Intercollegiate Football Association standings
	Conf.					Overall
Team	W		L		T	W		L		T
Williams $	4	–	1	–	1	5	–	2	–	1
Amherst	4	–	2	–	0	7	–	3	–	0
Boston Tech	2	–	2	–	1	2	–	7	–	1
Tufts	0	–	5	–	0	0	–	9	–	0
$ – Conference champion

The 1886 Amherst football team represented the Amherst College as a member of the Northern Intercollegiate Football Association during the 1886 college football season. The team compiled an overall record of 7–3 with a mark of 4–2 in conference play, placing second in the Northern league. The team played home games at Blake Field in Amherst, Massachusetts.

== Schedule ==
Date	Time	Opponent	Site	Result	Attendance	Source
October 13		at Massachusetts*	Agricultural College grounds; Amherst, MA	W 15–5		
October 15	4:00 p.m.	at Wesleyan*	Ward Street grounds; Hartford, CT	L 0–47		
October 20		at Trinity (CT)*	Hartford, CT	W 20–4		
October 23	3:05 p.m.	Boston Tech	Amherst, MA	W 18–0		
October 30		Williams	Blake Field; Amherst, MA (rivalry)	W 6–4		
November 3	3:02 p.m.	at Tufts	Medford, MA	W 18–4		
November 5	2:30 p.m.	at Boston Tech	Union Grounds; Boston, MA	L 0–22		
November 9	12:45 p.m.	Tufts	Amherst, MA	W 22–12		
November 13		Trinity (CT)*	Blake Field; Amherst, MA	W 16–8		
November 20	2:15 p.m.	at Williams	Weston Field; Williamstown, MA	L 0–30	500	
*Non-conference game
