= South End Grounds =

Baseball parks in Boston, Massachusetts

- Walpole Street Grounds; Grand Pavilion; Boston Base-Ball Grounds
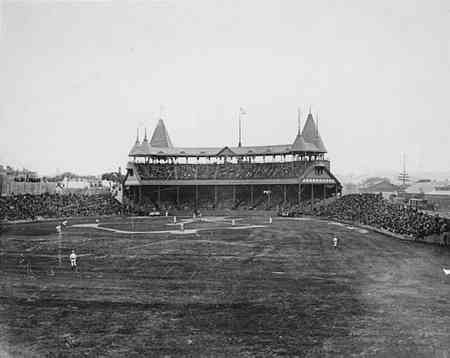
- South End grounds in 1893
- Interactive map of South End Grounds
- Location: Boston, Massachusetts
- Coordinates: 42°20′15″N 71°5′13″W
- Owner: Boston Braves
- Capacity: 6,800 (1888)
- Surface: Grass
- Field size: Left Field – 250 feet (76 m); Left-Center – 445 feet (136 m); Deep Left-Center – 450 feet (140 m); Center Field – 440 feet (130 m); Right-Center – 440 feet (130 m); Right Field – 255 feet (78 m) * Dimensions for South End Grounds III

Construction
- Groundbreaking: 1871
- Opened: May 16, 1871
- Closed: August 11, 1914
- Demolished: 1914

Tenant
- Boston Braves (MLB) (1871–1914)

South End Grounds refers to any one of three baseball parks on one site in Boston, Massachusetts. They were home to the franchise that eventually became known as the Boston Braves, first in the National Association and later in the National League, from 1871 through part of the 1914 season. That stretch of 43 1/2 seasons is still the longest tenure of the Braves club at any of their various ballparks and cities since 1914.

At least in its third edition, the formal name of the park—as indicated by the sign over its entrance gate—was Boston National League Base Ball Park. It was located on the northeast corner of Columbus Avenue and Walpole Street (now Saint Cyprian's Place), just southwest of Carter Playground. Accordingly, it was also known over the years as Walpole Street Grounds; two other names were Union Base-ball Grounds and Boston Baseball Grounds.

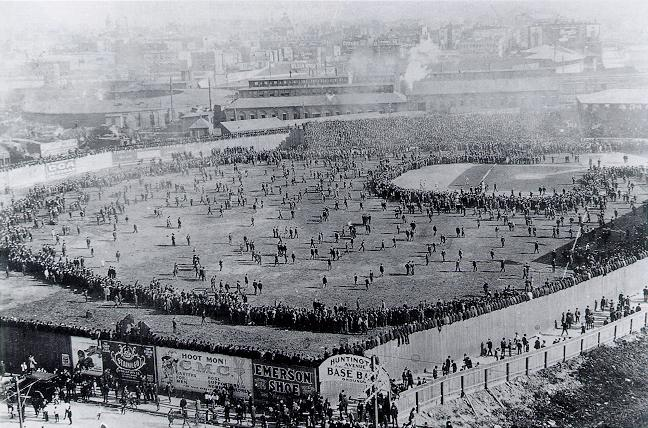
1903 World Series – Huntington Avenue Grounds in the foreground, the third South End Grounds in the hazy background to the upper right

The ballpark was across the New York, New Haven and Hartford Railroad tracks, to the south, from the eventual site of the Huntington Avenue Grounds, home field of Boston's American League team prior to the building of Fenway Park.

The Boston club was initially known as the "Red Stockings," because four of its key players had come from the famous 1869–1870 barnstorming team known as the Cincinnati Red Stockings and took the nickname with them to Boston. Over time the team acquired other informal nicknames, such as "Beaneaters," "Red Caps," "Rustlers" and "Doves." This team eventually adopted the official nickname "Braves," just a few years before abandoning South End Grounds.

With its tight foul lines and expansive center field, like a scaled-down version of the Polo Grounds, it was sometimes said that the South End had no right or left field, only a center field.

South End Grounds was rebuilt twice during its lifetime, the first time by choice and the second time by necessity.

== First park ==
The first game at the South End Grounds was played on May 16, 1871. The original stands were small and rectangular, not unlike the seating area at a county fair grounds. Behind the right field area were residences and other buildings, and a narrow road called Berlin Street. Columbus Avenue had not yet been extended as far as the ball park.

The Red Stockings dominated the National Association, finishing just two games behind the leaders in 1871, then winning four straight pennants to close out the NA. They joined the newly formed National League in 1876 and won three championships over the first 12 NL seasons. The last game at this version of the grounds came on September 10, 1887. The ballpark's stands were demolished later that month to make way for a new structure.

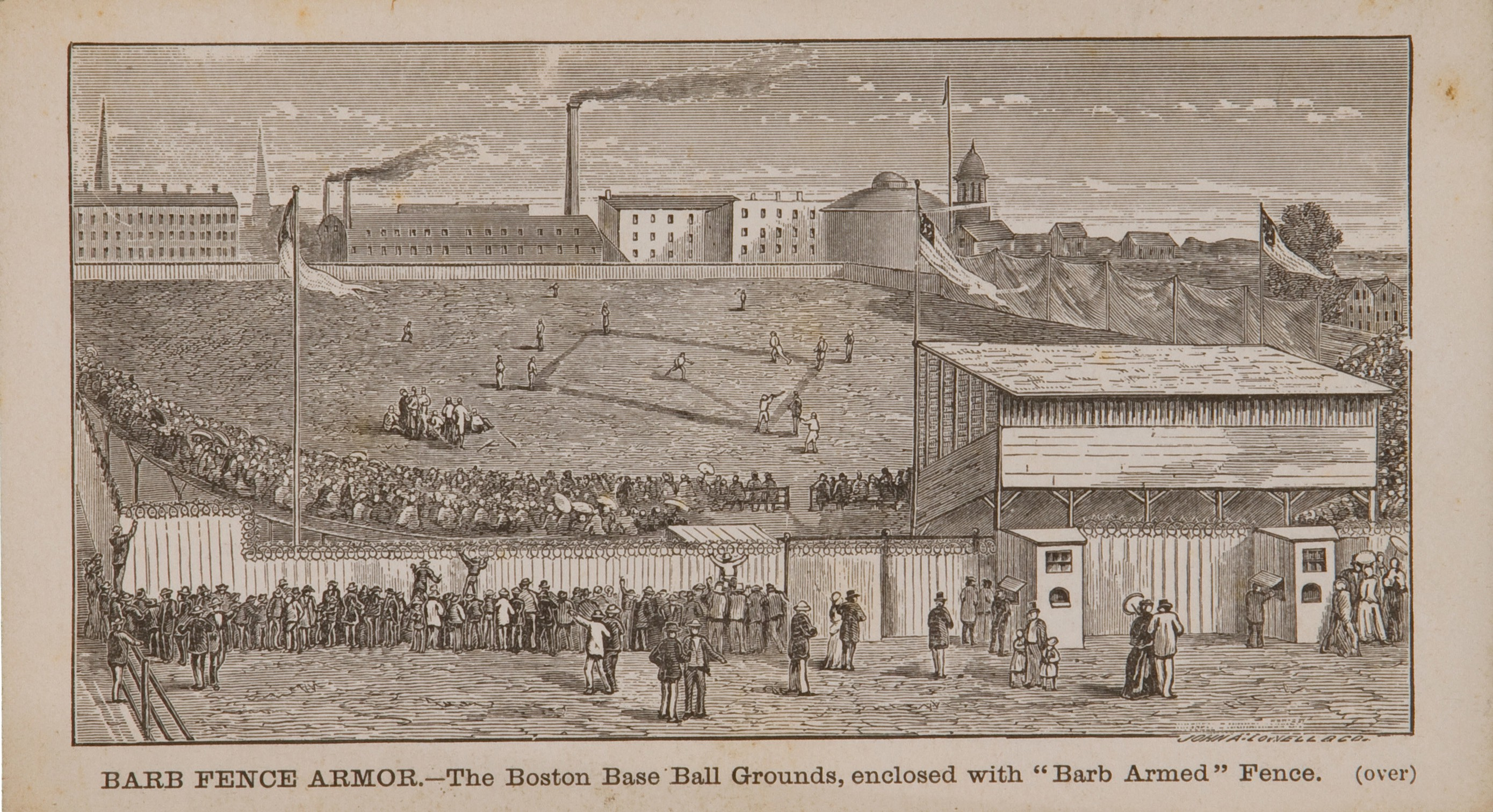
Washburn & Moen trade card depicting the Boston Base Ball Grounds in 1876

Original layout of the ballpark

== Second park ==
The second South End Grounds was opened on May 25, 1888. Sometimes referred to as the "Grand Pavilion," it consisted of a large double-decker grandstand behind home plate and uncovered stands stretching down the right and left field lines, as well as bleachers in right-center field. The medieval-style "witch's cap" turrets were a very popular decoration on public seating structures of the 1880s and 1890s. The ballpark seated 6,800 by one estimate. It was the only double-decked baseball stadium ever built in Boston, apart from the rooftop seating which has turned the single-decked Fenway Park into a de facto double-deck ballpark. The stadium was destroyed in the Great Roxbury Fire of May 16, 1894, which began when children started a small fire beneath the right field bleachers, and which spread and destroyed the stadium and 117 other buildings. During the rebuilding process, the Bostons played their home games at Congress Street Grounds.

=== Seating capacity ===
| Years | Capacity |
|---|---|
| 1888–1892 | 6,800 |
| 1893–1894 | 8,500 |

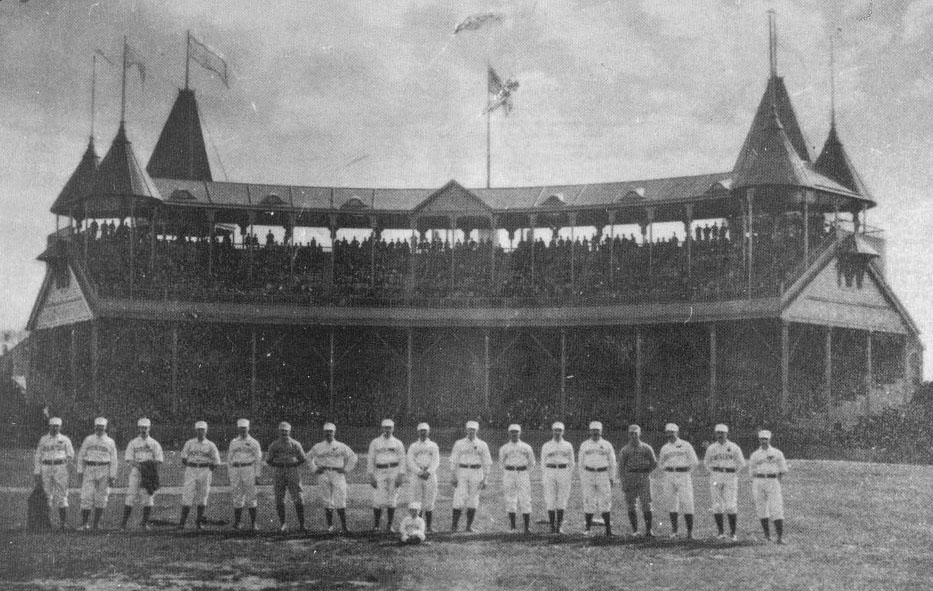
South End Grounds (1888), grandstand in background

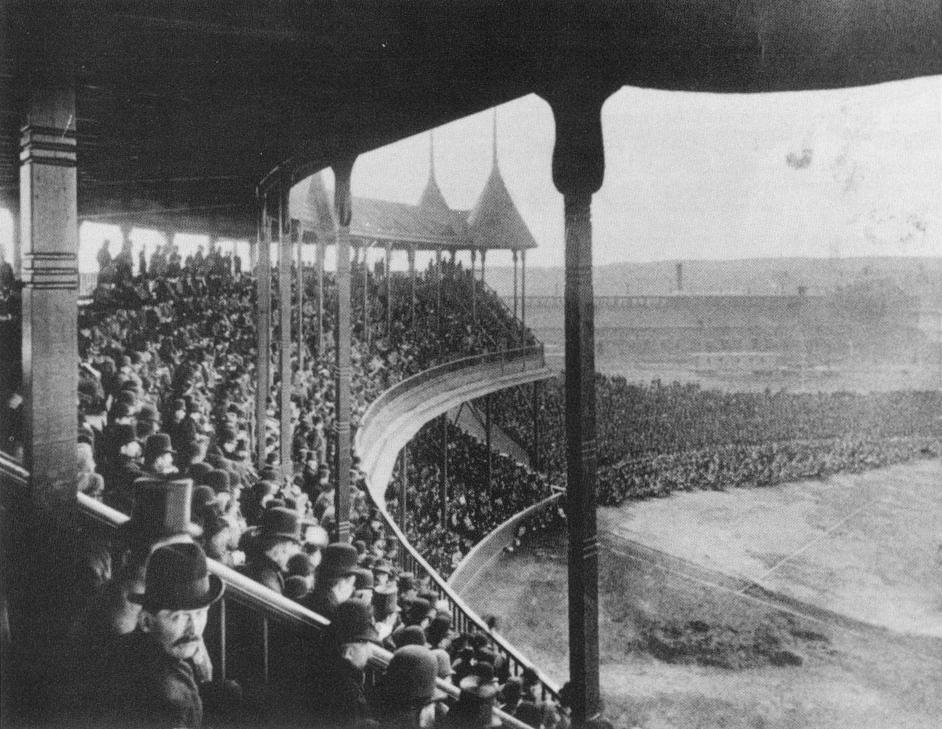
View from the grandstand (1888)

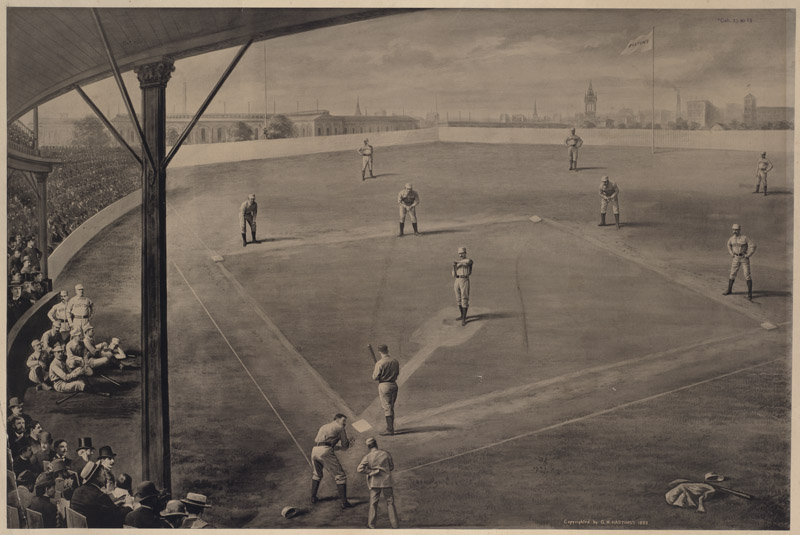
Boston National League team, South End Grounds (1888)

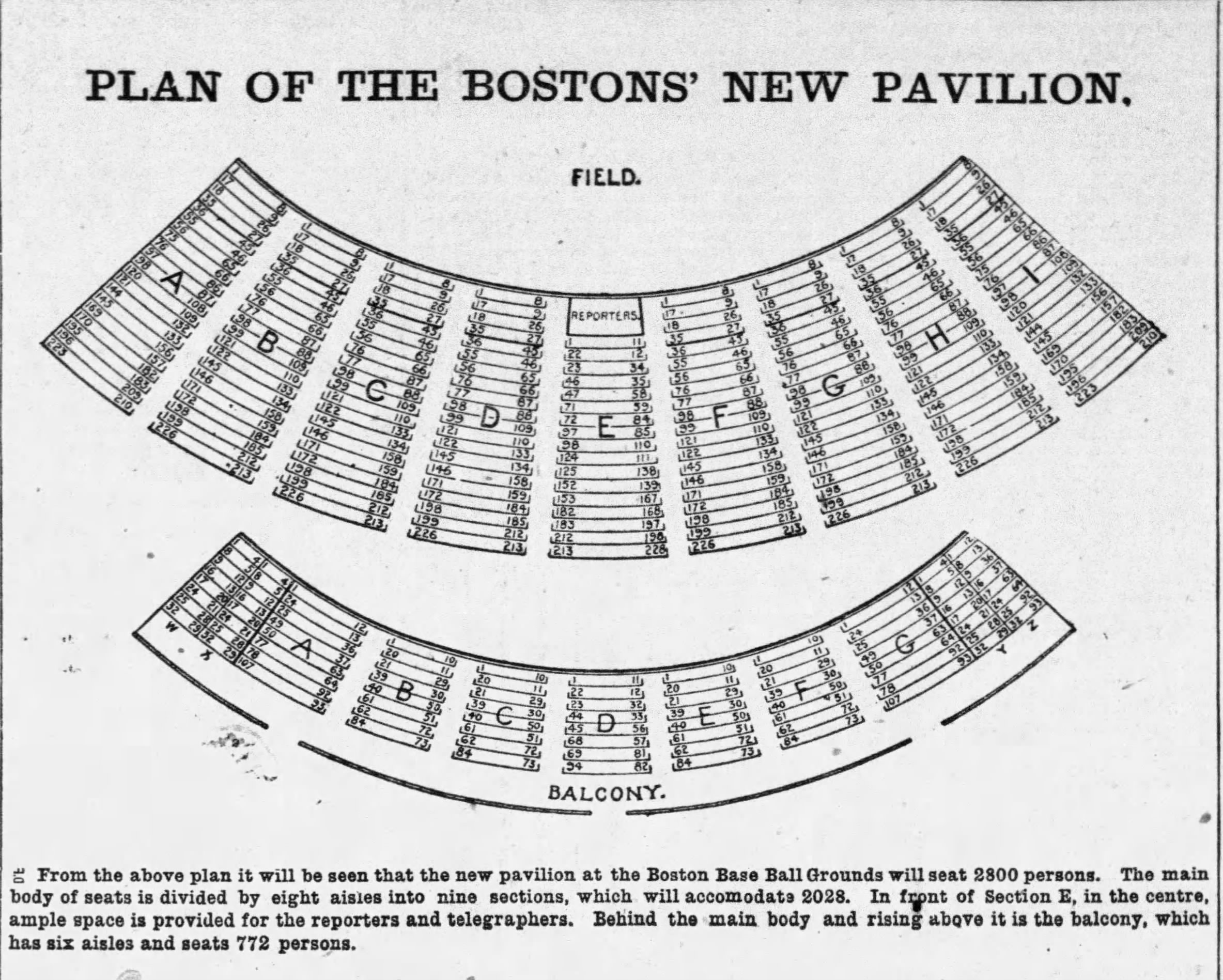
Plan of the new pavilion, 1888

Burned district (1894)

== Third park ==
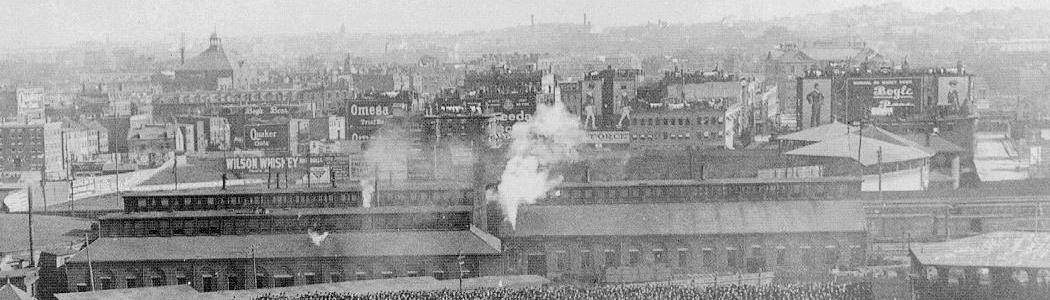
South End Grounds #3 isolated from the 1903 World Series photo

The third South End Grounds was built in 10 weeks on the site of the old stand and opened on July 20, 1894. Because the previous structure had not been sufficiently insured, there wasn't enough money to rebuild the stands according to its old plans, and a smaller structure was built. One result of the fire was a reconfiguration of the buildings and streets in the area. Berlin Street disappeared, and Columbus Avenue was constructed, running just outside the right field area, replacing wooden buildings that had once stood there.

Few photographs of this ballpark seem to be in circulation. In one sense, the best known photo might be the one showing the opening game of the 1903 World Series, with the Huntington Avenue Grounds in the foreground; and the South End Grounds in the background, its season over, partially hidden by smoke from the rail yards. That image can be seen beside this text. On September 12, 1911, 44-year-old legend Cy Young pitched the final home game of his career in a Boston uniform at the grounds against the New York Giants and fellow future Baseball Hall of Famer Christy Mathewson. The Braves, as they had been rechristened in 1912, moved out of the South End Grounds after their game on August 11, 1914, to accommodate larger crowds during the "stretch drive" of the 1914 pennant race. The team continued to play at Fenway Park until Braves Field was completed during the 1915 season. In contrast to the 11-year lifespan of the Huntington Avenue Grounds, the South End Grounds was the National Association / National League club's home for parts of 44 seasons, a longer time span than any subsequent Braves' home fields.

=== Seating capacity ===
| Years | Capacity |
|---|---|
| 1894 | 5,000 |
| 1895–1907 | 6,600 |
| 1908–1911 | 9,800 |
| 1912–1914 | 11,000 |

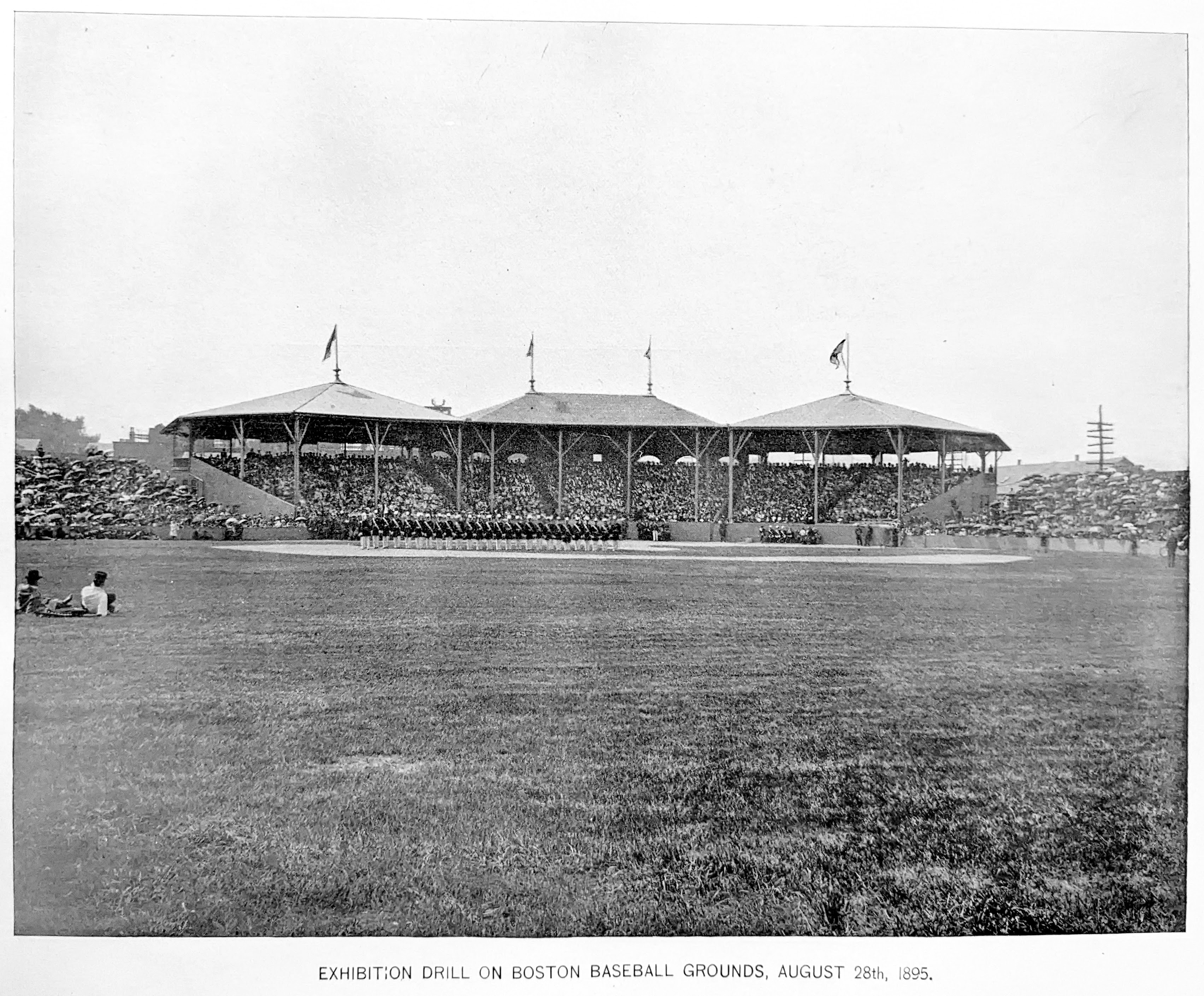
Exhibition drill held on August 28, 1895, as part of Masonic convention activities

1899 diagram of South End Grounds

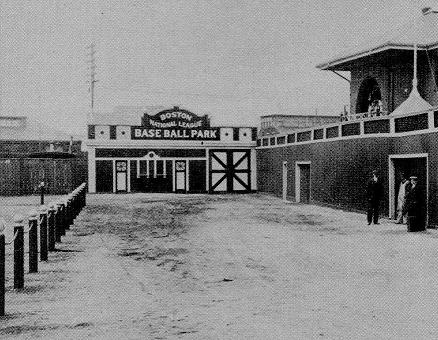
Entrance, circa 1900

Ballpark layout, 1914

== Duration ==
The Red Stockings / Beaneaters / Braves played their home games in various ballparks and cities, and the South End Grounds remains their longest-used home field in their history:

- South End Grounds 1871–1914 (43 1/2 seasons)
- Fenway Park 1914–1915 (parts of 2 seasons)
- Braves Field 1915–1952 (37 1/2 seasons)
- Milwaukee County Stadium 1953–1965 (13 seasons)
- Atlanta–Fulton County Stadium 1966–1996 (31 seasons)
- Turner Field 1997–2016 (20 seasons)
- Truist Park 2017–present (10 seasons)

== Current use ==
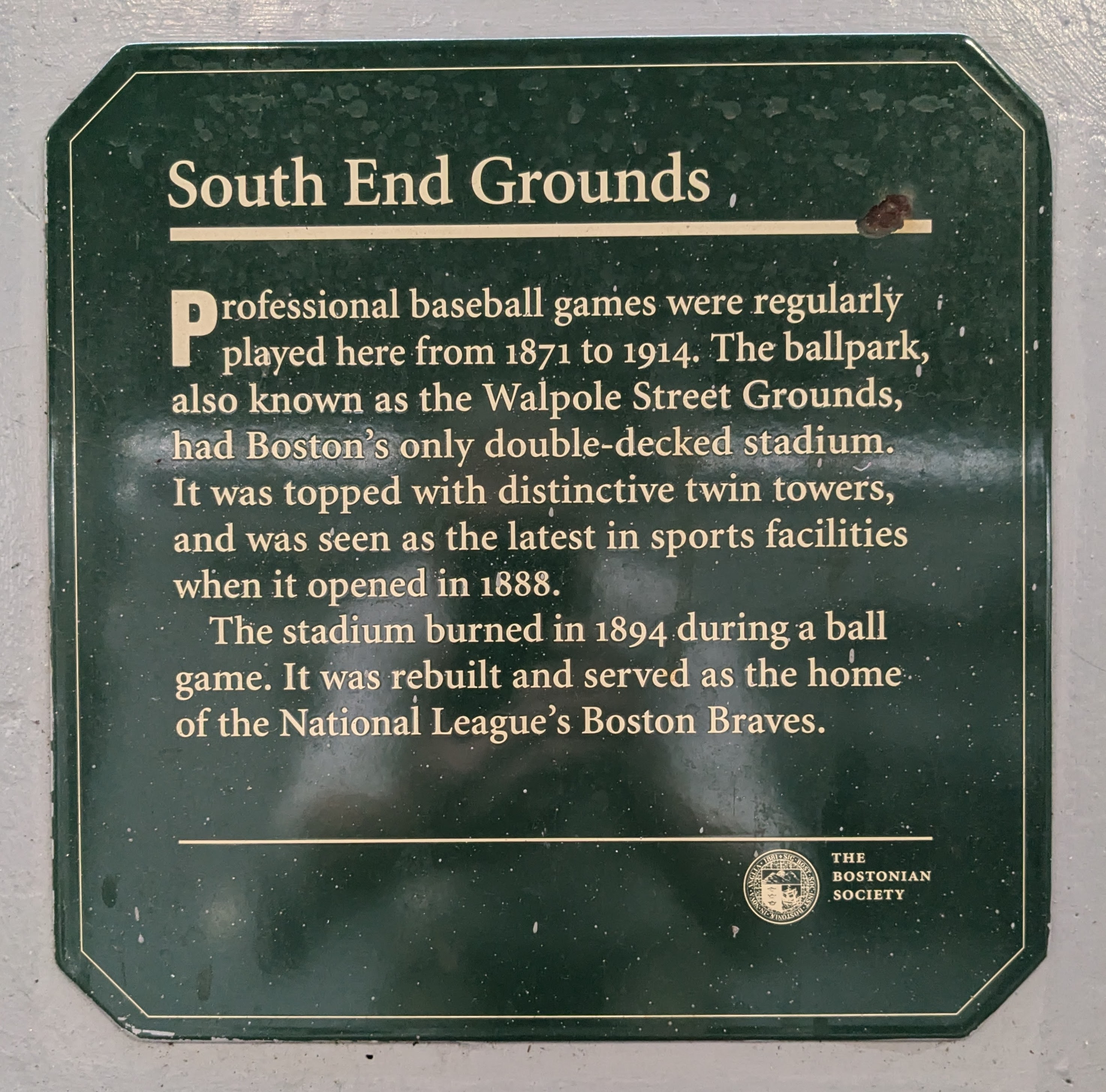
Plaque at Ruggles MBTA station concourse, placed by The Bostonian Society

The stadium was demolished after the Braves left. The former site of the grandstand and the infield is located where Northeastern University's Interdisciplinary Science and Engineering Complex (ISEC) currently stands, between the Columbus Parking Garage and Ruggles Station of the Orange Line of the Massachusetts Bay Transportation Authority. The outfield was located where the garage stands. A historical marker commemorating the South End Grounds is located at Ruggles Station.

== Sources ==
- Green Cathedrals, by Phil Lowry
- Ballparks of North America, by Michael Benson
- Baseball Memories 1900–1909, by Marc Okkonen
- Baseball Uniforms of the 20th Century, by Marc Okkonen

| Preceded by first ballpark | Home of the Boston Braves; 1876–1914 | Succeeded by Fenway Park |
