= 1886 Williams Ephs football team =

American college football season

1886 Williams Ephs football

Northern league champion
- Conference: Northern Intercollegiate Football Association
- Record: 5–2–1 (4–1–1 Northern)
- Head coach: None
- Captain: Charles Frederick Brusie
- Home stadium: Weston Field

1886 Northern Intercollegiate Football Association standings
	Conf.					Overall
Team	W		L		T	W		L		T
Williams $	4	–	1	–	1	5	–	2	–	1
Amherst	4	–	2	–	0	7	–	3	–	0
Boston Tech	2	–	2	–	1	2	–	7	–	1
Tufts	0	–	5	–	0	0	–	9	–	0
$ – Conference champion

The 1886 Williams Ephs football team represented the Williams College as a member of the Northern Intercollegiate Football Association during the 1886 college football season. Williams compiled an overall record of 5–2–1 with a mark of 4–1–1 in conference play, winning the Northern league title. The team played home games at Weston Field in Williamstown, Massachusetts.

== Schedule ==
Date	Time	Opponent	Site	Result	Attendance	Source
October 16		Ridgefields*	Williamstown, MA	W 26–0		
October 20	2:24 p.m.	at Tufts	College Hill; Medford, MA	W 61–0		
October 23		Yale*	Williamstown, MA	L 0–76		
October 30		at Amherst	Blake Field; Amherst, MA (rivalry)	L 4–6		
November 3	2:32 p.m.	at Boston Tech	Union Grounds; Boston, MA	T 14–14		
November 6		Tufts	Weston Field; Williamstown, MA	W 33–4		
November 13	1:45 p.m.	Boston Tech	Weston Field; Williamstown, MA	W 21–0	200	
November 20	2:15 p.m.	Amherst	Weston Field; Williamstown, MA	W 30–0	500	
*Non-conference game
